= 2014 Alps Tour =

Golf tour season

2014 Alps Tour season
- Duration: 18 February 2014 – 19 October 2014
- Number of official events: 18
- Most wins: (Italy) Nino Bertasio (2) (Austria) Tobias Nemecz (2) (Spain) Borja Virto (2)
- Order of Merit: (Italy) Nino Bertasio

The 2014 Alps Tour was the 14th season of the Alps Tour, a third-tier golf tour recognised by the European Tour.

== Schedule ==
The following table lists official events during the 2014 season.

Date	Tournament	Host country	Purse (€)	Winner (Note: The number in brackets after each winner's name is the number of Alps Tour events they had won up to and including that tournament. It is rare for someone to accumulate many wins on the Alps Tour as success at this level usually leads to promotion to the Challenge Tour.)
20 Feb	Red Sea El Ein Bay Open	Egypt	30,000	(England) Steven Brown (3)
26 Feb	Red Sea Little Venice Open	Egypt	30,000	(England) Andrew Cooley (3)
3 May	Open International de Rebetz	France	40,000	(France) Matthieu Pavon (1)
11 May	Gösser Open	Austria	40,000	(France) Thomas Elissalde (1)
17 May	Alps Tour Colli Berici	Italy	40,000	(England) Alexander Christie (1)
31 May	Open de Saint François Region Guadeloupe	Guadeloupe	40,000	(Italy) Nino Bertasio (1)
7 Jun	Asiago Open	Italy	40,000	(Italy) Nino Bertasio (2)
13 Jun	Open Peugeot	Spain	45,000	(Republic of Ireland) Brendan McCarroll (4)
22 Jun	Open de la Mirabelle d'Or	France	45,000	(France) Jean-Pierre Verselin (1)
28 Jun	Alps de Las Castillas	Spain	48,000	(Spain) Borja Virto (1)
4 Jul	Flory Van Donck Trophy	Belgium	40,000	(Belgium) Kevin Hesbois (a) (1)
18 Jul	Servizitalia Open	Italy	40,000	(Austria) Tobias Nemecz (1)
26 Jul	Alps de Andalucía	Spain	48,000	(Spain) Borja Etchart (2)
5 Sep	Open La Pinetina – Memorial Giorgio Bordoni	Italy	40,000	(Spain) Borja Virto (2)
14 Sep	Citadelle Trophy International	France	45,000	(England) Tom Wilde (1)
21 Sep	Open du Haut Poitou	France	40,000	(Austria) Tobias Nemecz (2)
12 Oct	Masters 13	France	45,000	(Spain) Eduardo Larrañaga (1)
19 Oct	Abruzzo Open	Italy	40,000	(Spain) Juan Antonio Bragulat (3)

== Order of Merit ==
The Order of Merit was based on tournament results during the season, calculated using a points-based system. The top five players on the Order of Merit (not otherwise exempt) earned status to play on the 2015 Challenge Tour.

Position	Player	Points	Status earned
1	(Italy) Nino Bertasio	31,994	Promoted to Challenge Tour
2	(Spain) Borja Etchart	24,644	Promoted to Challenge Tour
3	(Austria) Tobias Nemecz	24,005	Promoted to Challenge Tour
4	(Spain) Borja Virto	21,947	Qualified for European Tour (Top 25 in Q School)
5	(France) Thomas Elissalde	20,636	Promoted to Challenge Tour
6	(France) Clément Berardo	19,471	Promoted to Challenge Tour
7	(France) Jean-Pierre Verselin	15,704	
8	(France) Matthieu Pavon	15,513	
9	(France) Alessio Bruschi	15,445	
10	(France) Dominique Nouailhac	15,155	
