= Le Vaudreuil Golf Challenge =

Coordinates: 49.255°N 1.226°E

Tournament information
- Location: Le Vaudreuil, France
- Established: 2013
- Course: Golf PGA France du Vaudreuil
- Par: 72
- Length: 7,000 yards (6,400 m)
- Tour: Challenge Tour
- Format: Stroke play
- Prize fund: €300,000
- Month played: June

Tournament record score
- Aggregate: 266 Aaron Rai (2017); 266 Richard McEvoy (2018)
- To par: −19 Brinson Paolini (2013)

Current champion
- (France) Julien Sale

Final champion
- Location in France Location in Normandy

The Le Vaudreuil Golf Challenge is a golf tournament on the Challenge Tour, played at the Golf PGA France du Vaudreuil in Le Vaudreuil, France. It was played for the first time in July 2013.

Brinson Paolini won the inaugural tournament.

== Winners ==
| Year | Winner | Score | To par | Margin of victory | Runner(s)-up |
|---|---|---|---|---|---|
| 2026 | (France) Julien Sale | 276 | −12 | 1 stroke | (Denmark) Hamish Brown |
| 2025 | (England) David Horsey | 272 | −16 | Playoff | (England) James Allan (Spain) Joseba Torres (Scotland) Daniel Young |
| 2024 | (Spain) Joel Moscatel | 274 | −14 | Playoff | (France) Benjamin Hébert |
| 2023 | (South Africa) Darren Fichardt | 273 | −15 | 2 strokes | (Wales) Oliver Farr |
| 2022 | (England) Nathan Kimsey | 274 | −14 | Playoff | (France) Robin Sciot-Siegrist |
| 2021 | (Germany) Marcel Siem | 269 | −15 | 1 stroke | (Chile) Hugo León |
| 2020 | Cancelled due to the COVID-19 pandemic | | | | |
| 2019 | (England) Steven Tiley | 273 | −11 | 1 stroke | (England) Richard Bland |
| 2018 | (England) Richard McEvoy | 266 | −18 | 2 strokes | (England) Steven Tiley |
| 2017 | (England) Aaron Rai | 266 | −18 | 5 strokes | (Denmark) Morten Ørum Madsen |
| 2016 | (Sweden) Alexander Björk | 270 | −14 | 1 stroke | (Australia) Nick Cullen (England) Aaron Rai |
| 2015 | (New Zealand) Ryan Fox | 270 | −14 | 1 stroke | (France) Thomas Linard |
| 2014 | (England) Andrew Johnston | 268 | −16 | 4 strokes | (South Korea) An Byeong-hun (United States) Connor Arendell (Sweden) Jens Fahrbring (France) Clément Sordet (a) |
| 2013 | (United States) Brinson Paolini | 269 | −19 | 1 stroke | (United States) Sihwan Kim (Spain) Adrián Otaegui |
