= Steven Brown (golfer) =

English golfer

Personal information
- Nationality: England
- Born: 7 May 1987 (age 39) Ashford, Surrey, England
- Height: 1.93 m (6 ft 4 in)

Career
- Sport: Golf
- Turned professional: 2011
- Current tour: Challenge Tour
- Former tours: European Tour; Alps Tour
- Professional wins: 4

Number of wins by tour
- European Tour: 1
- Other: 3

Steven Brown (born 7 May 1987) is an English professional golfer who plays on the European Tour. He won the 2019 Portugal Masters.

== Amateur career ==
Brown won the 2011 English Amateur. The same year he was runner-up in the European Amateur, losing to Manuel Trappel in a playoff, and runner-up to Andy Sullivan in the Scottish Amateur Stroke Play Championship. He represented Great Britain & Ireland in the successful 2011 Walker Cup, winning the decisive half point against Blayne Barber that secured the victory.

== Professional career ==
Brown turned professional after the 2011 Walker Cup. He played on the Alps Tour in 2012 and 2013. In 2013, he won twice and finished third in the Order of Merit to earn a place on the 2014 Challenge Tour. He played some early-season Alps Tour events in 2014, winning the opening event of the season, the Red Sea El Ain Bay Open, for his third win on the tour.

Brown played on the Challenge Tour from 2014 to 2017. He had a successful season in 2017 with seven top-10 finishes, including being a runner-up in the Irish Challenge. He finished the season 12th in the Order of Merit to earn a place on the European Tour for 2018.

Brown was involved in a four-way playoff for the 2018 Made in Denmark tournament, losing out to Matt Wallace after Wallace birdied the second playoff hole. He finished the season 97th in the Order of Merit. Brown had a disappointing 2019 season until late in the year when he finished 11th in the Open de France and then won the Portugal Masters the following week.

== Amateur wins ==
- 2008 Faldo Series - Grand Final
- 2011 English Amateur

== Professional wins (4) ==
=== European Tour wins (1) ===
| No. | Date | Tournament | Winning score | Margin of victory | Runners-up |
|---|---|---|---|---|---|
| 1 | 27 Oct 2019 | Portugal Masters | −17 (69-67-65-66=267) | 1 stroke | (South Africa) Brandon Stone, (South Africa) Justin Walters |

European Tour playoff record (0–1)

| No. | Year | Tournament | Opponents | Result |
|---|---|---|---|---|
| 1 | 2018 | Made in Denmark | (England) Jonathan Thomson, (England) Matt Wallace, (England) Lee Westwood | Wallace won with birdie on second extra hole Thomson and Westwood eliminated by birdie on first hole |

=== Alps Tour wins (3) ===
| No. | Date | Tournament | Winning score | Margin of victory | Runner(s)-up |
|---|---|---|---|---|---|
| 1 | 23 Jun 2013 | Open de la Mirabelle d'Or | −7 (70-70-72-65=277) | 1 stroke | (France) Pierrick Peracino, (Austria) Uli Weinhandl |
| 2 | 7 Sep 2013 | Golf Asiago Open | −12 (67-63-68=198) | 3 strokes | (France) Clément Berardo, (Italy) Lorenzo Scotto |
| 3 | 20 Feb 2014 | Red Sea El Ein Bay Open | −10 (70-70-66=206) | 1 stroke | (Spain) Borja Virto |

== Team appearances ==
Amateur

- Walker Cup (representing Great Britain & Ireland): 2011 (winners)
- European Amateur Team Championship (representing England): 2011

== See also ==
- 2017 Challenge Tour graduates
