= Slovakia Challenge =

D+D Real Slovakia Challenge
Tournament information
- Location: Senica, Slovakia
- Established: 2014
- Course: Penati Golf Resort
- Par: 72
- Length: 7,115 yards (6,506 m)
- Tour: Challenge Tour
- Format: Stroke play
- Prize fund: €200,000
- Month played: July
- Final year: 2019

Tournament record score
- Aggregate: 267 Andrew McArthur (2014)
- To par: −21 as above

Final champion
- (Wales) Rhys Enoch
- Location in Slovakia

The D+D Real Slovakia Challenge is a golf tournament on the Challenge Tour. It was first played in July 2014 at the Penati Golf Resort in Senica, Slovakia. It was the first Challenge Tour event played in Slovakia. The event was not held in 2017 or 2018 but returned in 2019.

== Winners ==
Year	Winner	Score	To par	Margin of victory	Runner-up
2020	Cancelled due to COVID-19 pandemic				
2019	(Wales) Rhys Enoch	270	−18	1 stroke	(New Zealand) Josh Geary
2017–18: No tournament
2016	(Norway) Espen Kofstad	271	−17	Playoff	(France) Romain Langasque
2015	(Spain) Borja Virto	271	−17	1 stroke	(Portugal) Ricardo Gouveia
2014	(Scotland) Andrew McArthur	267	−21	2 strokes	(England) Sam Hutsby
