= Irish Challenge =

Golf tournament in Ireland, within the Challenge Tour

Tournament information
- Location: County Meath, Ireland
- Established: 2015
- Course: Killeen Castle
- Par: 72
- Length: 7,596 yards (6,946 m)
- Tour: Challenge Tour
- Format: Stroke play
- Prize fund: €300,000
- Month played: August

Tournament record score
- Aggregate: 269 Todd Clements (2022)
- To par: −19 as above

Current champion
- (South Africa) Justin Harding

Location map
- Location in the Republic of Ireland

The Irish Challenge is a golf tournament on the Challenge Tour which has been played since 2015.

== History ==
The tournament was formed in 2015, hosted at Mount Wolseley Hotel Spa and Golf Resort in County Carlow. It was first time the Challenge Tour had staged an event in Ireland since 2009. The first event was played in October and was won by Tom Murray who beat Nino Bertasio at the second hole of a sudden-death playoff, winning the first prize of €28,800.

The 2019 event was shortened to 54 holes after the final was abandoned because of heavy rain. Emilio Cuartero and Oscar Lengdén were tied for the lead after three rounds and had a playoff at the par-3 17th hole. Cuartero won with a birdie at the third extra hole.

The 2020 event was cancelled due to the COVID-19 pandemic, but returned in 2021 and was held at Portmarnock Hotel & Golf Links.

In April 2022, it was announced that The K Club would host the event as part of an agreement, which is also involved hosting the Irish Open. The K Club would host the Irish Challenge in 2022, 2024 and 2026. Although, the 2026 event was ultimately not played at The K Club, being played at Killeen Castle instead.

== Winners ==
Year	Winner	Score	To par	Margin of victory	Runner(s)-up	Venue
Irish Challenge
2026	(South Africa) Justin Harding	275	−13	1 stroke	(South Africa) Louis Albertse (France) Mathieu Decottignies-Lafon	Killeen Castle
2025	(France) Oïhan Guillamoundeguy	277	−11	3 strokes	(Switzerland) Ronan Kleu	Killeen Castle
2024	(Sweden) Joakim Lagergren	272	−16	1 stroke	(France) Sébastien Gros	K Club (Palmer South)
2023	(England) Brandon Robinson-Thompson	272	−12	2 strokes	(England) Will Enefer (United States) Jordan Gumberg	Headfort
2022	(England) Todd Clements	269	−19	6 strokes	(Northern Ireland) Tom McKibbin	K Club (Palmer South)
2021	(Netherlands) Daan Huizing	275	−9	Playoff	(Spain) Eduard Rousaud	Portmarnock
2020	Cancelled due to the COVID-19 pandemic					
Stone Irish Challenge
2019	(Spain) Emilio Cuartero	205 (Note: Shortened to 54 holes due to rain.)	−12	Playoff	(Sweden) Oscar Lengdén	Headfort
Monaghan Irish Challenge
2018	(England) Oliver Wilson	276	−12	2 strokes	(Switzerland) Marco Iten	Concra Wood
Irish Challenge
2017	(France) Julien Guerrier	271	−17	6 strokes	(Norway) Jarand Ekeland Arnøy (England) Steven Brown (Sweden) Oscar Lengdén	Mount Wolseley
Volopa Irish Challenge
2016	(Germany) Bernd Ritthammer	278	−10	5 strokes	(England) Marcus Armitage (England) Sam Walker	Mount Wolseley
2015	(England) Tom Murray	272	−16	Playoff	(Italy) Nino Bertasio	Mount Wolseley
