= 2015 Challenge Tour graduates =

This is a list of players who graduated from the Challenge Tour in 2015. The top 15 players on the Challenge Tour's money list in 2015 earned European Tour cards for 2016.

	2015 Challenge Tour		2016 European Tour				
Player	Money list rank	Earnings (€)	Starts	Cuts made	Best finish	Money list rank	Earnings (€)
(Portugal) Ricardo Gouveia*	1	251,952	26	18	T3	54	709,976
(France) Sébastien Gros*	2	178,645	26	11	4	102	263,325
(Spain) Borja Virto	3	150,466	30	12	T9	131	182,289
(Spain) Nacho Elvira	4	114,878	29	16	2	44	824,367
(Denmark) Joachim B. Hansen	5	113,135	27	8	T11	152	115,630
(Sweden) Björn Åkesson	6	104,539	27	7	T3	171	83,443
(England) Gary Boyd	7	96,290	23	8	T7	139	162,186
(Wales) Rhys Davies	8	94,832	28	9	T25	176	73,802
(France) Thomas Linard*	9	91,258	23	10	T5	125	210,580
(Sweden) Jens Fahrbring*	10	89,731	28	9	T12	156	104,763
(Denmark) Jeff Winther*	11	87,033	26	8	2	117	224,702
(Scotland) Andrew McArthur	12	82,545	21	5	T29	203	35,873
(England) Callum Shinkwin*	13	81,082	23	16	T8	83	399,367
(South Africa) Brandon Stone*	14	80,979	24	15	Win	50	722,606
(Scotland) Jamie McLeary	15	80,353	24	9	T7	166	88,509

* European Tour rookie in 2016
T = Tied
The player retained his European Tour card for 2017 (finished inside the top 111).
The player did not retain his European Tour card for 2017, but retained conditional status (finished between 112 and 148, inclusive).
The player did not retain his European Tour card for 2017 (finished outside the top 148).

Elvira earned promotion to the European Tour after his third win of the season in August. Fahrbring and Winther regained their cards for 2017 through Q School.

== Winners on the European Tour in 2016 ==
No.	Date	Player	Tournament	Winning score	Margin of victory	Runner-up
1	10 Jan	(South Africa) Brandon Stone	BMW SA Open	−14 (71-67-65-71=274)	2 strokes	(South Africa) Christiaan Bezuidenhout

== Runners-up on the European Tour in 2016 ==
No.	Date	Player	Tournament	Winner	Winning score	Runner-up score
1	14 Feb	(Denmark) Jeff Winther	Tshwane Open	(South Africa) Charl Schwartzel	−16 (71-64-66-63=264)	−8 (73-66-69-64=272)
2	25 Apr	(South Africa) Brandon Stone	Shenzhen International	(South Korea) Lee Soo-min	−16 (66-65-70-71=272)	−14 (67-70-69-68=274)
3	8 May	(Spain) Nacho Elvira; Lost in playoff	Trophée Hassan II	(South Korea) Wang Jeung-hun	−5 (71-68-74-70=283)	−5 (71-71-72-69=283)

== See also ==
- 2015 European Tour Qualifying School graduates
