= Nacho Elvira =

Spanish professional golfer

Personal information
- Full name: Ignacio Elvira Mijares
- Nationality: Spain
- Born: 17 February 1987 (age 39) Madrid, Spain
- Height: 1.85 m (6 ft 1 in)
- Weight: 82 kg (181 lb; 12.9 st)

Career
- Sport: Golf
- College: Texas A&M University
- Turned professional: 2011
- Current tour: European Tour
- Former tour: Challenge Tour
- Professional wins: 7

Number of wins by tour
- European Tour: 3
- Challenge Tour: 4

Best results in major championships
- Masters Tournament: DNP
- PGA Championship: DNP
- U.S. Open: DNP
- The Open Championship: CUT: 2023, 2024

Achievements and awards
- European Tour Graduate of the Year: 2016

Ignacio "Nacho" Elvira Mijares (born 17 February 1987) is a Spanish professional golfer who plays on the European Tour.

== Amateur career ==
Elvira played college golf at Texas A&M University where he won one event and was a two-time All-American.

== Professional career ==
Elvira played on the Challenge Tour in 2012 and 2013, finishing 104th and then 14th. He won his first title in 2013 at The Foshan Open in China, and finished 14th in the Order of Merit to gain a place on the 2014 European Tour.

After a mediocre 2014 European Tour season in which he finished 121st, he returned to the Challenge Tour for 2015, where he won three times to earn an immediate return to the European Tour.

Since 2016 he has played on the European Tour. He lost a playoff at the 2016 Trophée Hassan II to Wang Jeung-hun. In 2019, he lost in another sudden death playoff to Scott Hend at the Maybank Championship. He had held the 54-hole lead but went to the last hole of regulation play, one stroke behind Hend. During his approach to the 18th, a clap of thunder occurred during his backswing, resulting in him leaving a 30 foot putt for birdie. Play was then suspended for over an hour, but Elvira came back to sink the lengthy birdie putt to force a playoff. He lost on the first extra hole, when Hend made an up and down from the bunker for birdie.

In July 2021, Elvira beat Justin Harding in a playoff to win the Cazoo Open for his first European Tour victory.

== Amateur wins ==
- 2008 Barona Intercollegiate Cup

== Professional wins (7) ==
=== European Tour wins (3) ===
No.	Date	Tournament	Winning score	Margin of victory	Runner(s)-up
1	25 Jul 2021	Cazoo Open	−16 (64-67-66-71=268)	Playoff	(South Africa) Justin Harding
2	26 May 2024	Soudal Open	−18 (64-64-67-71=266)	1 stroke	(France) Romain Langasque, (Denmark) Niklas Nørgaard, (Belgium) Thomas Pieters
3	18 Jan 2026	Dubai Invitational	−10 (69-68-68-69=274)	1 stroke	(New Zealand) Daniel Hillier

European Tour playoff record (1–3)

No.	Year	Tournament	Opponent	Result
1	2016	Trophée Hassan II	(South Korea) Wang Jeung-hun	Lost to birdie on second extra hole
2	2019	Maybank Championship	(Australia) Scott Hend	Lost to birdie on first extra hole
3	2021	Cazoo Open	(South Africa) Justin Harding	Won with par on first extra hole
4	2023	Made in HimmerLand	(Denmark) Rasmus Højgaard	Lost to par on sixth extra hole

=== Challenge Tour wins (4) ===
No.	Date	Tournament	Winning score	Margin of victory	Runner(s)-up
1	20 Oct 2013	Foshan Open	−14 (68-68-66-72=274)	1 stroke	(England) Tyrrell Hatton, (India) Shiv Kapur, (England) Sam Walker
2	25 Apr 2015	Challenge de Madrid	−21 (66-68-66-67=267)	4 strokes	(Portugal) Ricardo Gouveia, (Republic of Ireland) Ruaidhri McGee
3	24 May 2015	Kärnten Golf Open	−21 (64-67-67-65=263)	1 stroke	(Sweden) Jens Dantorp
4	22 Aug 2015	Rolex Trophy	−24 (63-65-69-67=264)	2 strokes	(Portugal) Ricardo Gouveia

== Results in major championships ==
Tournament	2023	2024
Masters Tournament		
PGA Championship		
U.S. Open		
The Open Championship	CUT	CUT

Did not play

CUT = missed the half-way cut

== Team appearances ==
Amateur

- European Youths' Team Championship (representing Spain): 2006 (winners)
- European Amateur Team Championship (representing Spain): 2007, 2009, 2010, 2011
- Eisenhower Trophy (representing Spain): 2010
- Palmer Cup (representing Europe): 2011

== See also ==
- 2013 Challenge Tour graduates
- 2015 Challenge Tour graduates
- List of golfers to achieve a three-win promotion from the Challenge Tour
- List of golfers with most Challenge Tour wins
