= Challenge de Madrid =

Golf tournament in Spain

Tournament information
- Location: Madrid, Spain
- Established: 2013
- Course: Real Club de Golf La Herrería
- Par: 70
- Length: 6,675 yards (6,104 m)
- Tour: Challenge Tour
- Format: Stroke play
- Prize fund: €170,000
- Month played: April/May
- Final year: 2016

Tournament record score
- Aggregate: 267 Nacho Elvira (2015)
- To par: −21 as above

Final champion
- (Scotland) Duncan Stewart
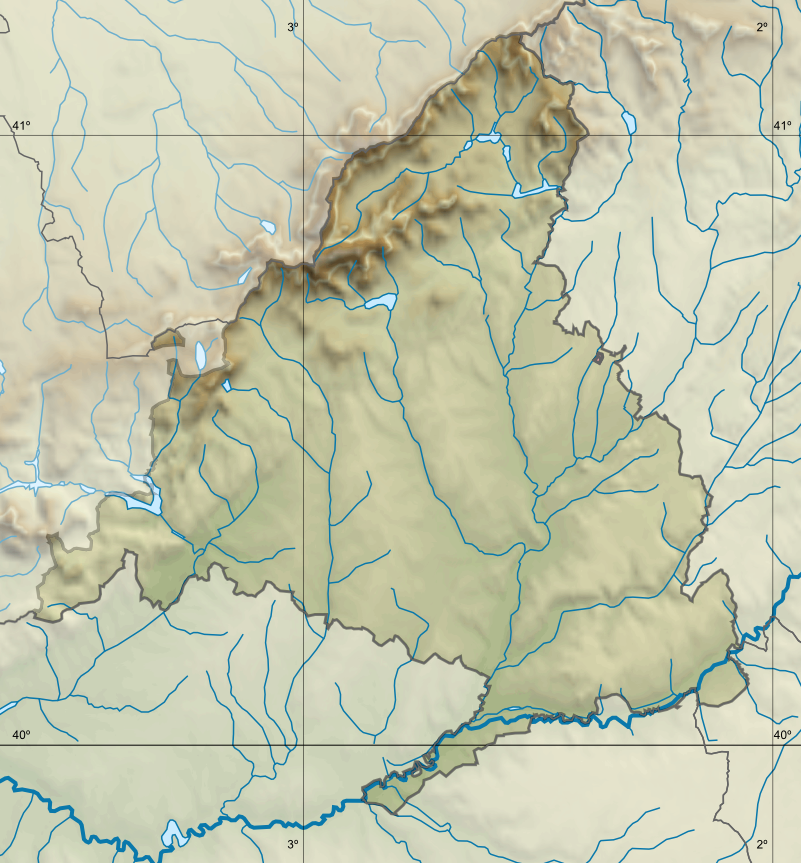
- Location in Spain Location in Community of Madrid

The Challenge de Madrid was a golf tournament on the Challenge Tour. It was played for the first time in April 2013 at the El Encín Golf Hotel, Alcala de Henares in Madrid, Spain.

François Calmels won the inaugural tournament.

== Winner ==
Year	Winner	Score	To par	Margin of victory	Runner(s)-up
2016	(Scotland) Duncan Stewart	272	−8	1 stroke	(England) Ben Stow
2015	(Spain) Nacho Elvira	267	−21	4 strokes	(Portugal) Ricardo Gouveia (Republic of Ireland) Ruaidhri McGee
2014: No tournament
2013	(France) François Calmels	271	−17	7 strokes	(Finland) Tapio Pulkkanen
