= Brinson Paolini =

American golfer (born 1991)

Personal information
- Nationality: United States
- Born: January 8, 1991 (age 35) Boise, Idaho, U.S.
- Height: 5 ft 10 in (1.78 m)
- Weight: 150 lb (68 kg; 11 st)

Career
- Sport: Golf
- College: Duke University
- Turned professional: 2013
- Current tour: Challenge Tour
- Former tour: European Tour
- Professional wins: 1

Number of wins by tour
- Challenge Tour: 1

Brinson Paolini (born January 8, 1991) is an American professional golfer.

== Career ==
Brinson was born in Boise, Idaho and grew up in Virginia Beach, Virginia. He has won the Virginia Amateur four times. He played college golf at Duke University.

Brinson turned professional in 2013 and began playing on the Challenge Tour. He finished in a tie for second in his first event, the Swiss Challenge, and won the third event he played in, the Le Vaudreuil Golf Challenge.

== Amateur wins ==
- 2008 Virginia Amateur
- 2009 Virginia Amateur
- 2010 Virginia Amateur
- 2013 Virginia Amateur

== Professional wins (1) ==
=== Challenge Tour wins (1) ===
No.	Date	Tournament	Winning score	Margin of victory	Runners-up
1	Jul 28, 2013	Le Vaudreuil Golf Challenge	−19 (69-66-66-68=269)	1 stroke	(United States) Sihwan Kim, (Spain) Adrián Otaegui

== See also ==
- 2013 European Tour Qualifying School graduates
