= Nino Bertasio =

Italian professional golfer (born 1988)

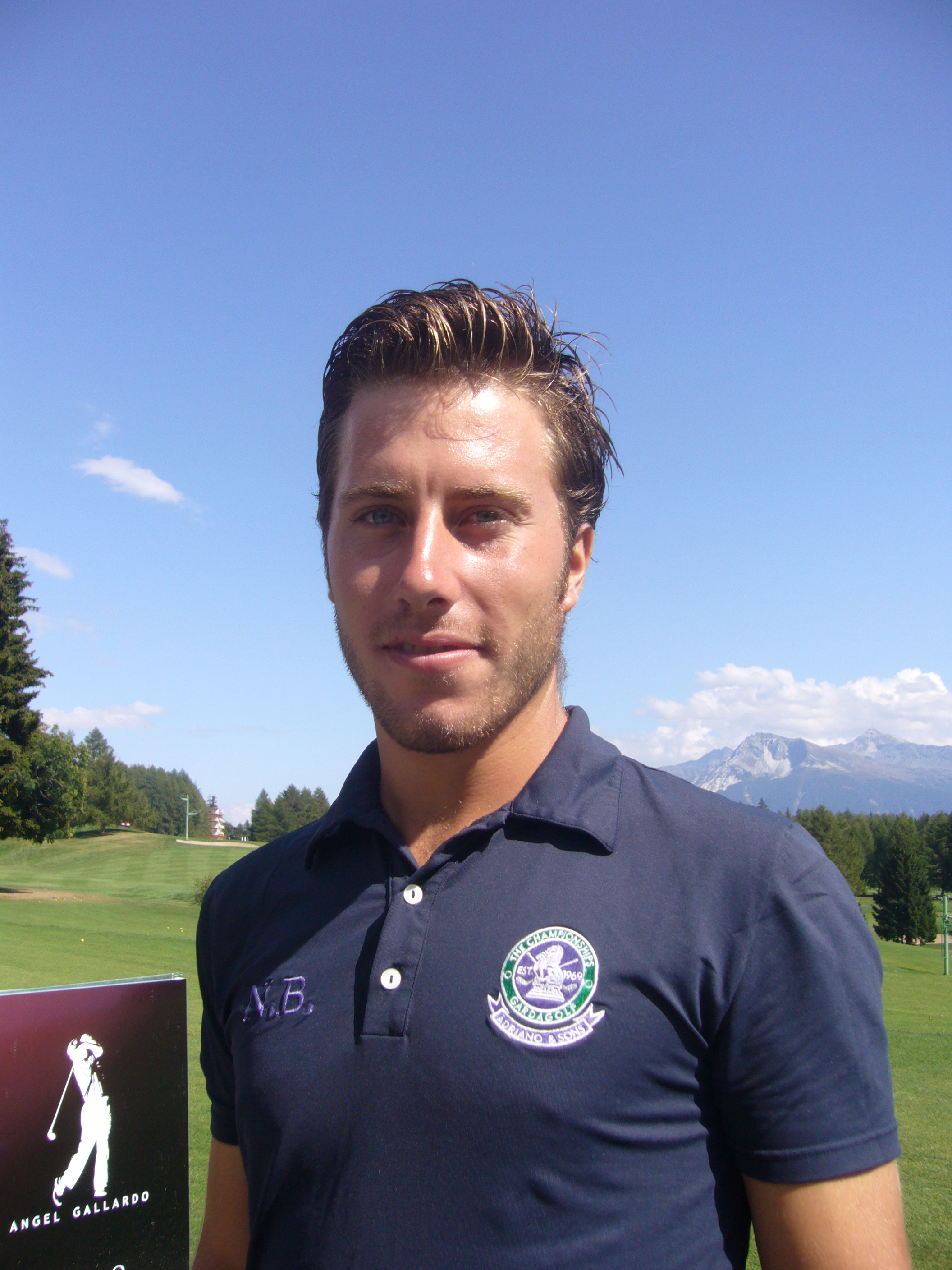
- Bertasio in 2009

Personal information
- Full name: Daniele Nino Bertasio
- Nationality: Italy
- Born: 30 July 1988 (age 38) Zürich, Switzerland
- Height: 1.83 m (6 ft 0 in)
- Weight: 86 kg (190 lb; 13.5 st)

Career
- Sport: Golf
- Turned professional: 2011
- Current tour: Challenge Tour
- Former tours: European Tour; Alps Tour
- Professional wins: 4

Best results in major championships
- Masters Tournament: DNP
- PGA Championship: DNP
- U.S. Open: DNP
- The Open Championship: T72: 2019

Achievements and awards
- Alps Tour Order of Merit winner: 2014

Daniele Nino Bertasio (born 30 July 1988) is an Italian professional golfer who plays on the European Tour and is currently attached to the Gardagolf Country Club.

== Professional career ==
After turning professional in 2011, he joined the Alps Tour. His first win on that tour came in 2014 at the Open St. Francois Region Guadeloupe, followed a week later by another win at the Asiago Open; he went on to win the Order of Merit and qualify for the Challenge Tour.

In 2015 he comfortably retained his card on the Challenge tour, with his best performance at the Volopa Irish Challenge where he lost in a playoff to Tom Murray. At the end of the year, he qualified for the 2016 season on the European Tour via qualifying school.

In 2016 Bertasio qualified for the 2016 Summer Olympics and finished tied for 30th.

Bertasio ended 2017 with a strong run of form that included a run of six top-20 finishes in eight tournaments with a share of tenth place at The Italian Open and eighth at the Andalucía Valderrama Masters.

He further established himself on the European Tour in 2018 with another consistent year that included a share of fifth at the Maybank Championship.

In July 2019, Bertasio shot rounds of 63, 67, 67 and 68 at The Renaissance Club to finish in a share of fourth at the Aberdeen Standard Investments Scottish Open, securing a place at The Open Championship at Royal Portrush – his first major – the following week. He made the halfway cut in Northern Ireland, finishing in a share of 72nd.

== Amateur wins ==
- 2008 Campionato Internazionale d'Italia, Italian Match Play, Italian National Stroke Play
- 2010 Copa Sotogrande, European Amateur Team Championship (individual)

== Professional wins (4) ==
=== Alps Tour wins (2) ===
No.	Date	Tournament	Winning score	Margin of victory	Runners-up
1	31 May 2014	Open de Saint François Region Guadeloupe	−10 (64-66-73=203)	3 strokes	(Spain) Juan Antonio Bragulat, (Italy) Giorgio de Filippi, (France) Raphaël Marguery, (France) Damien Perrier, (France) Nicolas Tacher
2	7 Jun 2014	Asiago Open	−9 (69-65-70=204)	2 strokes	(Italy) Alessio Bruschi, (France) Dominique Nouailhac, (Italy) Andrea Romano

=== EPD Tour wins (1) ===
No.	Date	Tournament	Winning score	Margin of victory	Runners-up
1	18 Feb 2011	Cimar Open Samanah	−7 (68-74-67=209)	1 stroke	(Germany) Benjamin Miarka, (France) Damien Perrier, (Germany) Bernd Ritthammer

=== Other wins (1) ===
- 2011 Italian Omnium Open

== Playoff record ==
Challenge Tour playoff record (0–1)

No.	Year	Tournament	Opponent	Result
1	2015	Volopa Irish Challenge	(England) Tom Murray	Lost to birdie on second extra hole

== Results in major championships ==
Tournament	2019
Masters Tournament	
PGA Championship	
U.S. Open	
The Open Championship	T72

Did not play

"T" = tied for place

== Team appearances ==
- European Amateur Team Championship (representing Italy): 2008, 2009, 2010
- Eisenhower Trophy (representing Italy): 2008, 2010
- St Andrews Trophy (representing the Continent of Europe): 2010 (winners)

== See also ==
- 2015 European Tour Qualifying School graduates
