= Joakim Lagergren =

Swedish professional golfer (born 1991)

Personal information
- Full name: Joakim Kevin Lagergren
- Nationality: Sweden
- Born: 15 November 1991 (age 34) Stockholm, Sweden
- Height: 1.75 m (5 ft 9 in)
- Weight: 63 kg (139 lb; 9.9 st)
- Life partner: Sara Bolay
- Children: 1

Career
- Sport: Golf
- Turned professional: 2010
- Current tour: European Tour
- Former tours: Challenge Tour; Nordic Golf League
- Professional wins: 8

Number of wins by tour
- European Tour: 1
- Challenge Tour: 3
- Other: 4

Best results in major championships
- Masters Tournament: DNP
- PGA Championship: DNP
- U.S. Open: CUT: 2025
- The Open Championship: CUT: 2026

Joakim Kevin Lagergren (born 15 November 1991) is a Swedish professional golfer. He currently plays on the European Tour having previously played on the Challenge Tour.

== Career ==
In 2010, Lagergren turned professional. He initially played his golf on the Nordic mini-tours picking up his first win at the 2010 Landskrona Masters on the Nordic Golf League.

He earned his playing rights on the 2011 Challenge Tour at qualifying school and played 13 events before returning to qualifying school at the end of 2011 where he earned his playing rights for the European Tour in 2012. During this season on the Challenge Tour, Lagergren continued to play in the Nordic League winning the 2011 ECCO Spanish Open.

During his first season on the European Tour, Lagergren played in 17 events finishing 140th in the Race to Dubai narrowly missing out on automatically retaining his tour card for 2013, however a second consecutive strong performance at qualifying school meant that he did regain his playing rights on the European Tour for 2013.

During 2013, Lagergren had an unsuccessful season on the European Tour and lost his playing rights at the end of the season, returning to the Challenge Tour for the 2014 season. However the season was not entirely unsuccessful as Lagergren gained his third win in the Nordic League by winning the 2013 Isaberg Open and at the Marbella Club Golf Resort on the Gecko Pro Tour.

In 2014, Lagergren got his first win on the Challenge Tour at the Northern Ireland Open Challenge. Lagergren lost a three-way playoff at the 2017 Commercial Bank Qatar Masters. In April 2017, he moved to a career best 129th on the Official World Golf Ranking. He clinched his maiden European Tour title at the 2018 Rocco Forte Sicilian Open. Lagergren shot his first albatross on Tour at the 2018 Turkish Airlines Open as he holed his five wood second shot with 238 yards left to the pin on the par five hole 12.

In 2019, Lagergren finished third at the Alfred Dunhill Links Championship, two strokes behind winner Victor Perez and was runner-up at the same tournament in 2021, two strokes behind Danny Willett. He finished solo second at the 2022 Estrella Damm N.A. Andalucía Masters, six shots behind Adrián Otaegui. He finished the 2022 European Tour season 45th on the Order of Merit Race to Dubai rankings.

Lagergren lost his card during the 2023 European Tour season. By August 2024, he had fallen to 580th in the Official World Golf Ranking. He won twice late in the 2024 Challenge Tour season to regain his European Tour status. In June 2025, he finished runner-up to Connor Syme at the KLM Open. Three months later, Lagergren recorded another runner-up finish, losing in a playoff to Rory McIlroy at the Amgen Irish Open. With these results, Lagergren moved to a career-high 121st in the world rankings.

== Awards and honors ==
In 2022, Lagergren received Elit Sign number 150 by the Swedish Golf Federation based on world ranking achievements.

== Professional wins (8) ==
=== European Tour wins (1) ===
No.	Date	Tournament	Winning score	Margin of victory	Runner-up
1	13 May 2018	Rocco Forte Sicilian Open	−16 (71-66-63-68=268)	Playoff	(France) Mike Lorenzo-Vera

European Tour playoff record (1–2)

No.	Year	Tournament	Opponent(s)	Result
1	2017	Commercial Bank Qatar Masters	(South Africa) Jaco van Zyl, (South Korea) Wang Jeung-hun	Wang won with birdie on first extra hole
2	2018	Rocco Forte Sicilian Open	(France) Mike Lorenzo-Vera	Won with birdie on first extra hole
3	2025	Amgen Irish Open	(Northern Ireland) Rory McIlroy	Lost to birdie on third extra hole

=== Challenge Tour wins (3) ===
No.	Date	Tournament	Winning score	Margin of victory	Runner-up
1	31 Aug 2014	Northern Ireland Open Challenge	−13 (62-71-66-72=271)	1 stroke	(France) Adrien Bernadet
2	4 Aug 2024	Irish Challenge	−16 (63-71-70-68=272)	1 stroke	(France) Sébastien Gros
3	25 Aug 2024	Indoor Golf Group Challenge	−12 (68-70-66-68=272)	1 stroke	(Sweden) Jesper Sandborg

=== Nordic Golf League wins (3) ===
No.	Date	Tournament	Winning score	Margin of victory	Runner-up
1	29 Aug 2010	Landskrona Masters	−12 (67-67-67=201)	1 stroke	(Sweden) Victor Almström
2	7 Mar 2011	ECCO Spanish Open	−9 (69-66-72=207)	1 stroke	(Norway) Christian Aronsen
3	10 Aug 2013	Isaberg Open	−8 (70-68-70=208)	1 stroke	(Sweden) Kristoffer Broberg

=== Other wins (1) ===
- 2013 Marbella Club Golf Resort (Gecko Pro Tour)

== Results in major championships ==
Tournament	2025	2026
Masters Tournament		
PGA Championship		
U.S. Open	CUT	
The Open Championship		CUT

Did not play

CUT = missed the halfway cut

== Team appearances ==
Amateur

- European Boys' Team Championship (representing Sweden): 2009

Professional

- World Cup (representing Sweden): 2018

== See also ==
- 2011 European Tour Qualifying School graduates
- 2012 European Tour Qualifying School graduates
- 2014 European Tour Qualifying School graduates
- 2024 Challenge Tour graduates
