= Tom Murray (golfer) =

English golfer (born 1990)

Personal information
- Nationality: England
- Born: 16 January 1990 (age 36) Manchester, England
- Height: 1.85 m (6 ft 1 in)
- Weight: 73 kg (161 lb; 11.5 st)

Career
- Sport: Golf
- Turned professional: 2009
- Current tours: Challenge Tour; European Tour
- Professional wins: 1

Number of wins by tour
- Challenge Tour: 1

Tom Murray (born 16 January 1990) is an English professional golfer. He won the 2015 Volopa Irish Challenge on the Challenge Tour.

== Early life ==
Murray was born in Manchester, England, the son of professional golfer Andrew Murray.

== Professional career ==
Murray turned professional in 2009. He played on the Challenge Tour in 2013 and 2014. After finishing T-10 at the 2014 European Tour Qualifying School, Murray played on the European Tour in 2015. While also playing on the 2015 Challenge Tour, Murray picked up his first professional win at the Volopa Irish Challenge, beating Nino Bertasio at the second hole of a sudden-death playoff. He failed to maintain his card after the 2015 European Tour season and has played mostly on the Challenge Tour since 2016. Since his 2015 win, his best results on the Challenge Tour have been third place in the 2017 Kazakhstan Open and runner-up in the same event in 2018 on the way to finishing 16th in the Challenge Tour Order of Merit, just missing out on his European Tour card.

Murray regularly contributes a column to the Manchester Evening News.

== Professional wins (1) ==
=== Challenge Tour wins (1) ===
| No. | Date | Tournament | Winning score | Margin of victory | Runner-up |
|---|---|---|---|---|---|
| 1 | 11 Oct 2015 | Volopa Irish Challenge | −16 (69-67-69-67=272) | Playoff | (Italy) Nino Bertasio |

Challenge Tour playoff record (1–0)

| No. | Year | Tournament | Opponent | Result |
|---|---|---|---|---|
| 1 | 2015 | Volopa Irish Challenge | (Italy) Nino Bertasio | Won with birdie on second extra hole |

== See also ==
- 2014 European Tour Qualifying School graduates
