= Andrew Murray (golfer) =

English golfer

Personal information
- Full name: Andrew Stephen Murray
- Nationality: England
- Born: 30 June 1956 (age 70) Manchester, England
- Height: 1.80 m (5 ft 11 in)
- Weight: 70 kg (150 lb; 11 st)

Career
- Sport: Golf
- Turned professional: 1972
- Current tour: European Senior Tour
- Former tour: European Tour
- Professional wins: 5
- Highest ranking: 94 (27 May 1990)

Number of wins by tour
- European Tour: 1

Best results in major championships
- Masters Tournament: DNP
- PGA Championship: DNP
- U.S. Open: DNP
- The Open Championship: CUT: 1982, 1986, 1990

Andrew Stephen Murray (born 30 June 1956) is an English professional golfer.

== Career ==
In 1956, Murray was born in Manchester.

In 1972, Murray turned professional. He played on the European Tour from 1979 to 1995. He retired from tournament golf after suffering from spondylitis for many years. He recorded his only win on the European Tour at the 1989 Panasonic European Open and finished the 1989 season at a career-best 28th on the Order of Merit. In 1994, he was joint runner-up in the Turespana Open De Canaria.

Murray worked as a commentator and analyst for the BBC. After turning 50, he combined that work with a return to tournament golf on the European Senior Tour.

== Personal life ==
Murray's son Tom Murray plays on the European Tour and the Challenge Tour.

== Professional wins ==
=== European Tour wins (1) ===
No.	Date	Tournament	Winning score	Margin of victory	Runner-up
1	10 Sep 1989	Panasonic European Open	−11 (66-68-71-72=277)	1 stroke	(New Zealand) Frank Nobilo

=== Other wins (4) ===
- 1987 Trinidad and Tobago Open
- 1988 Trinidad and Tobago Open
- 1989 Johnnie Walker International (Tobago)
- 1990 BWIA International Open (Tobago)

== Results in major championships ==
Tournament	1982	1983	1984	1985	1986	1987	1988	1989	1990
The Open Championship	CUT				CUT				CUT

Note: Murray only played in The Open Championship.

Did not play

CUT = missed the half-way cut
