= 2013 Challenge Tour graduates =

This is a list of players who graduated from the Challenge Tour in 2013. The top 15 players on the Challenge Tour's money list in 2013 earned their European Tour card for 2014.

	2013 Challenge Tour		2014 European Tour				
Player	Money list rank	Earnings (€)	Starts	Cuts made	Best finish	Money list rank	Earnings (€)
(Italy) Andrea Pavan	1	147,811	31	14	T8	119	204,022
(Portugal) José-Filipe Lima	2	123,697	24	11	T10	156	83,276
(United States) Brooks Koepka*	3	119,423	15	10	Win	8	1,658,574
(India) Shiv Kapur	4	118,323	26	17	T12	87	302,647
(Sweden) Johan Carlsson*	5	113,066	26	16	T5	98	263,580
(Netherlands) Daan Huizing*	6	104,870	28	15	T12	136	156,087
(Spain) Adrián Otaegui	7	104,811	32	15	T6	118	204,874
(Finland) Roope Kakko	8	100,293	27	16	T10	130	173,873
(United States) Sihwan Kim*	9	95,708	30	15	T9	132	166,057
(England) Tyrrell Hatton*	10	92,114	30	19	T2	36	689,241
(France) Victor Riu	11	87,297	31	12	8	133	164,650
(England) Robert Dinwiddie	12	86,489	11	5	T22	n/a	45,733
(France) François Calmels	13	85,534	27	10	T23	165	69,867
(Spain) Nacho Elvira*	14	82,785	32	21	T15	121	194,692
(Scotland) Jamie McLeary*	15	78,676	32	12	T20	152	94,131

* European Tour rookie in 2014
T = Tied
The player retained his European Tour card for 2016 (finished inside the top 110).
The player did not retain his European Tour card for 2016, but retained conditional status (finished between 111 and 147).
The player did not retain his European Tour card for 2015 (finished outside the top 147).

Koepka earned a direct promotion to the European Tour after his third win of the season in June. Pavan and Otaegui regained their cards for 2015 through Q School.

== Winners on the European Tour in 2014 ==
No.	Date	Player	Tournament	Winning score	Margin of victory	Runner-up
1	16 Nov	(United States) Brooks Koepka	Turkish Airlines Open	−17 (69-67-70-65=271)	1 stroke	(England) Ian Poulter

European Tour Final Series

== Runners-up on the European Tour in 2014 ==
No.	Date	Player	Tournament	Winner	Winning score	Runner-up score
1	9 Feb	(England) Tyrrell Hatton	Joburg Open	(South Africa) George Coetzee	−19 (65-68-69-66=268)	−16 (67-69-69-66=271)

== See also ==
- 2013 European Tour Qualifying School graduates
