= Jamie McLeary =

Scottish professional golfer

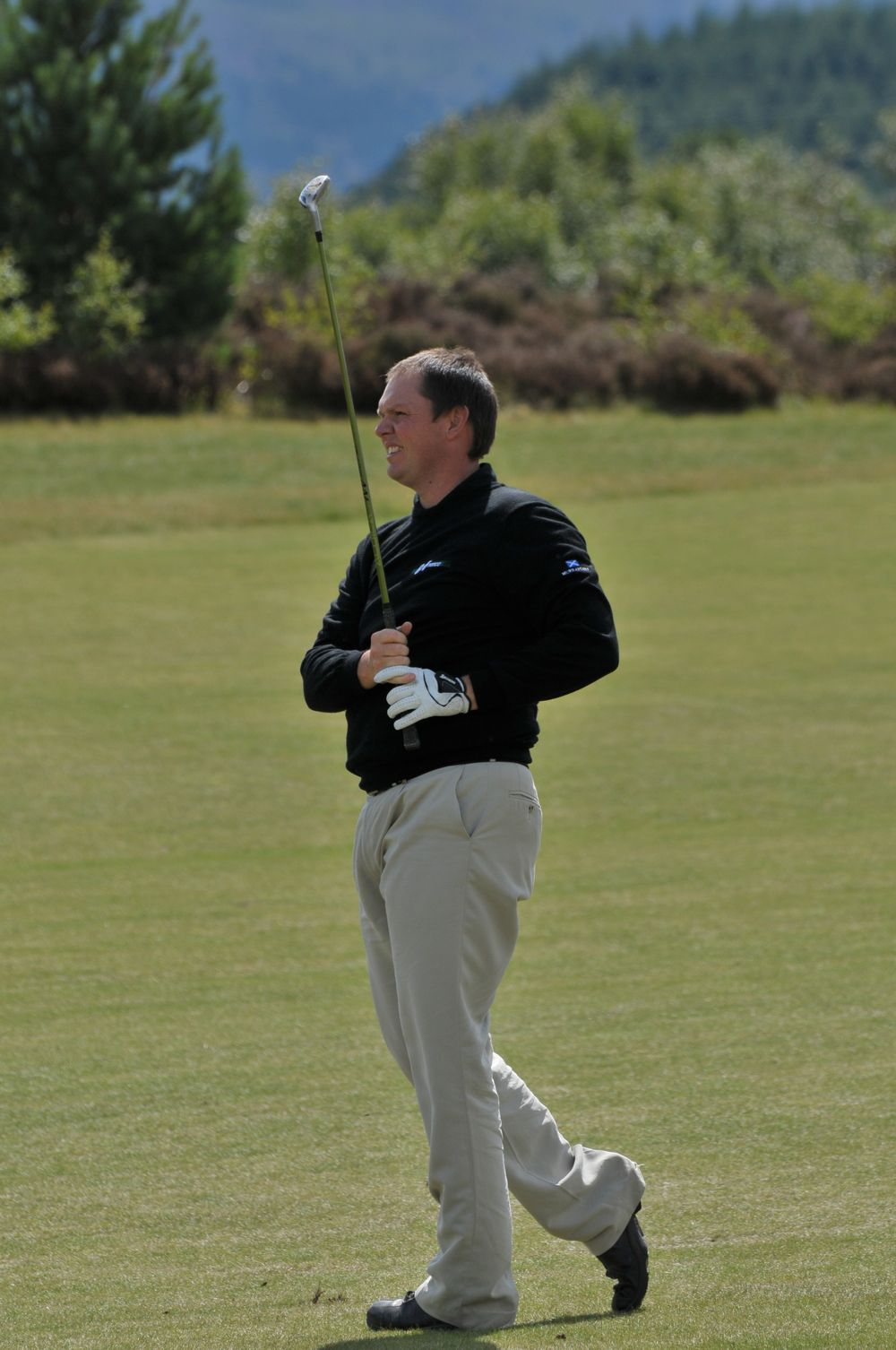

Personal information
- Full name: James Robert Ewan McLeary
- Nationality: Scotland
- Born: 2 April 1981 (age 45) Peterhead, Scotland
- Height: 5 ft 11 in (1.80 m)
- Weight: 196 lb (89 kg; 14.0 st)

Career
- Sport: Golf
- College: Odessa College; Baylor University
- Turned professional: 2006
- Current tour: Challenge Tour
- Former tours: European Tour; Asian Tour
- Professional wins: 3

Number of wins by tour
- Challenge Tour: 2
- Other: 1

Best results in major championships
- Masters Tournament: DNP
- PGA Championship: DNP
- U.S. Open: DNP
- The Open Championship: T58: 2014

James Robert Ewan McLeary (born 2 April 1981) is a Scottish professional golfer who plays on the Challenge Tour.

== Career ==
In 1981, McLeary was born in Peterhead, Scotland. In 2004, he represented Scotland at the Eisenhower Trophy and represented Great Britain and Ireland at the St Andrews Trophy. His team won the St Andrews Trophy and McLeary won the individual event as well. He played college golf at Odessa College and Baylor University in the United States.

McLeary reached the final stages of qualifying for the Asian Tour in both 2005 and 2006, but failed to win full playing privileges and played some events with only a partial category. He has played on the second tier European Challenge Tour since 2006, having failed to win a place on the European Tour in his several visits to qualifying school. His best finish on the end of season Challenge Tour Rankings came in 2009 when he placed 24th, missing out on the top 20 needed to achieve full European Tour status. In August 2009 he picked up his first professional win at the Scottish Hydro Challenge.

== Personal life ==
McLeary lives in Bonnyrigg, Midlothian.

== Amateur wins ==
- 2001 Scottish Youths Amateur Championship
- 2004 St Andrews Links Trophy

== Professional wins (3) ==
=== Challenge Tour wins (2) ===
No.	Date	Tournament	Winning score	Margin of victory	Runner-up
1	2 Aug 2009	Scottish Hydro Challenge	−8 (69-67-72-68=276)	2 strokes	(Italy) Edoardo Molinari
2	14 Jun 2015	KPMG Trophy	−13 (71-67-70-67=275)	1 stroke	(Netherlands) Taco Remkes

=== Tartan Pro Tour wins (1) ===
No.	Date	Tournament	Winning score	Margin of victory	Runners-up
1	16 Sep 2020	St Andrews Classic	−9 (67-67=134)	2 strokes	(Scotland) Jack McDonald, (Scotland) Chris Robb

== Team appearances ==
Amateur

- European Youths' Team Championship (representing Scotland): 2002
- Eisenhower Trophy (representing Scotland): 2004
- St Andrews Trophy (representing Great Britain and Ireland): 2004 (winners)

== Photo gallery ==
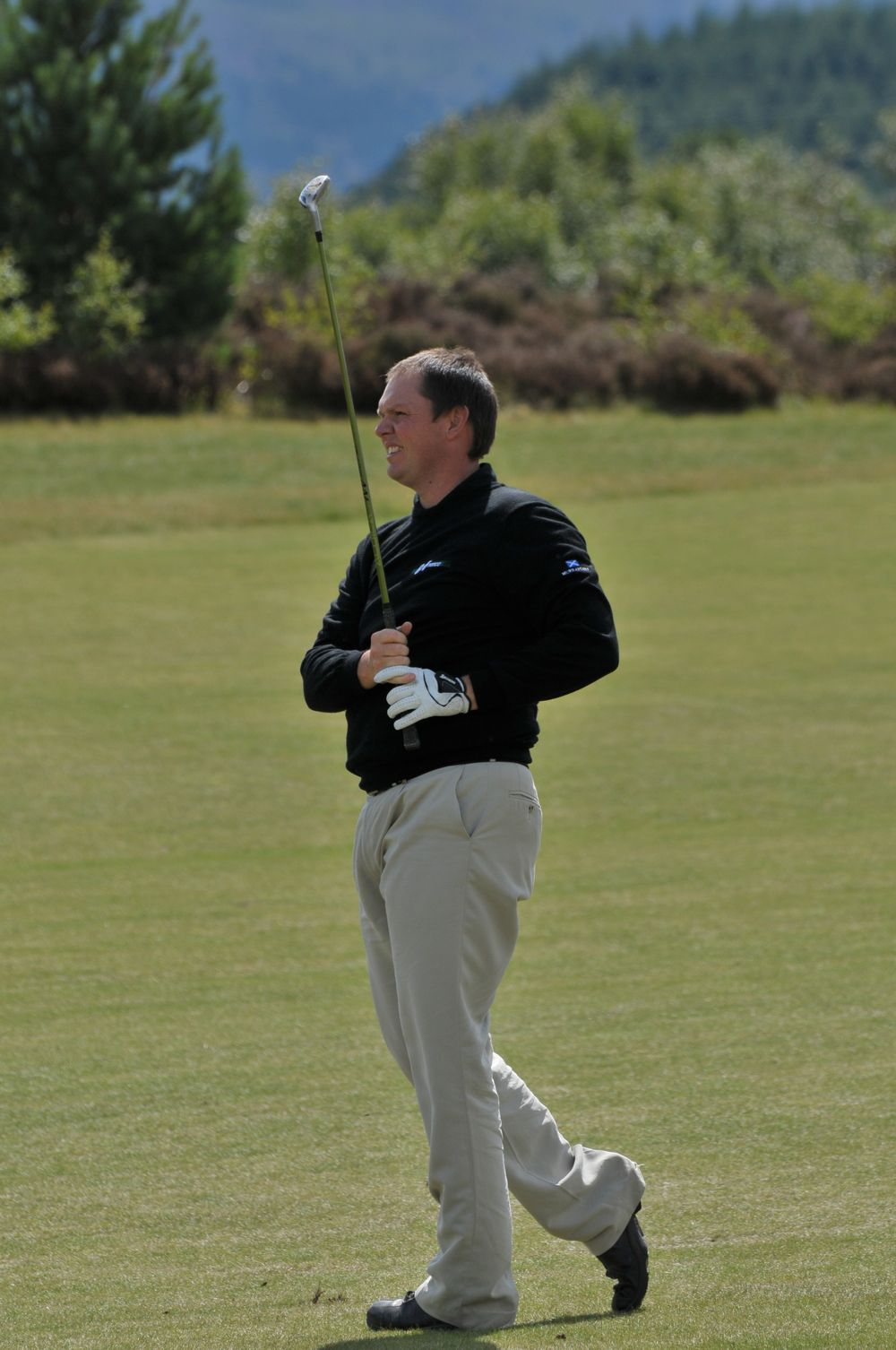
McLeary at the 2009 Scottish Hydro Challenge

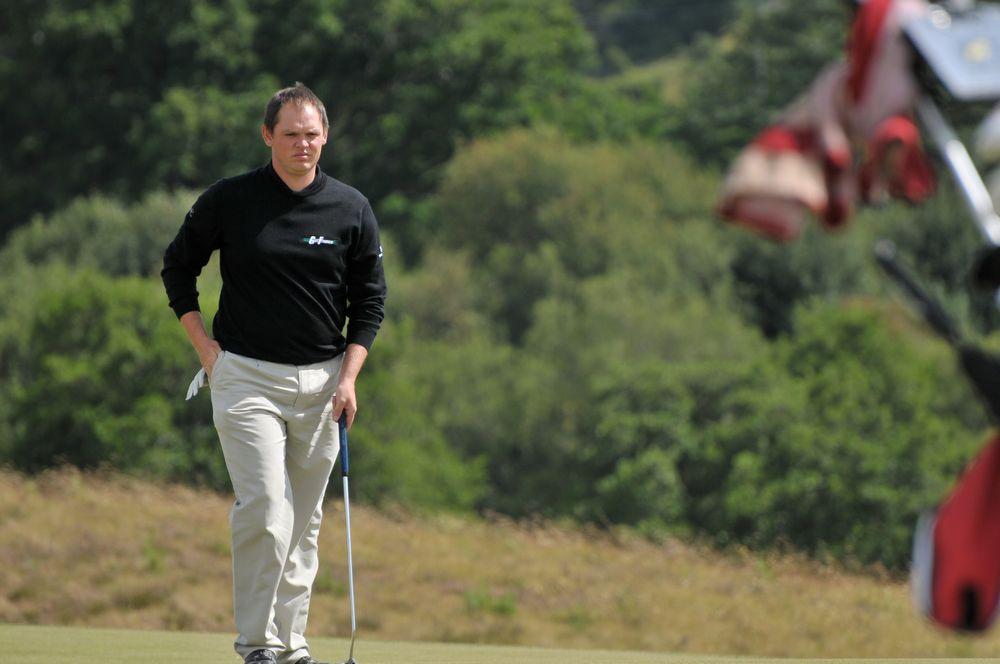
McLeary at the 2009 Scottish Hydro Challenge

== See also ==
- 2013 Challenge Tour graduates
- 2015 Challenge Tour graduates
