= Andrea Pavan =

Italian professional golfer (born 1989)

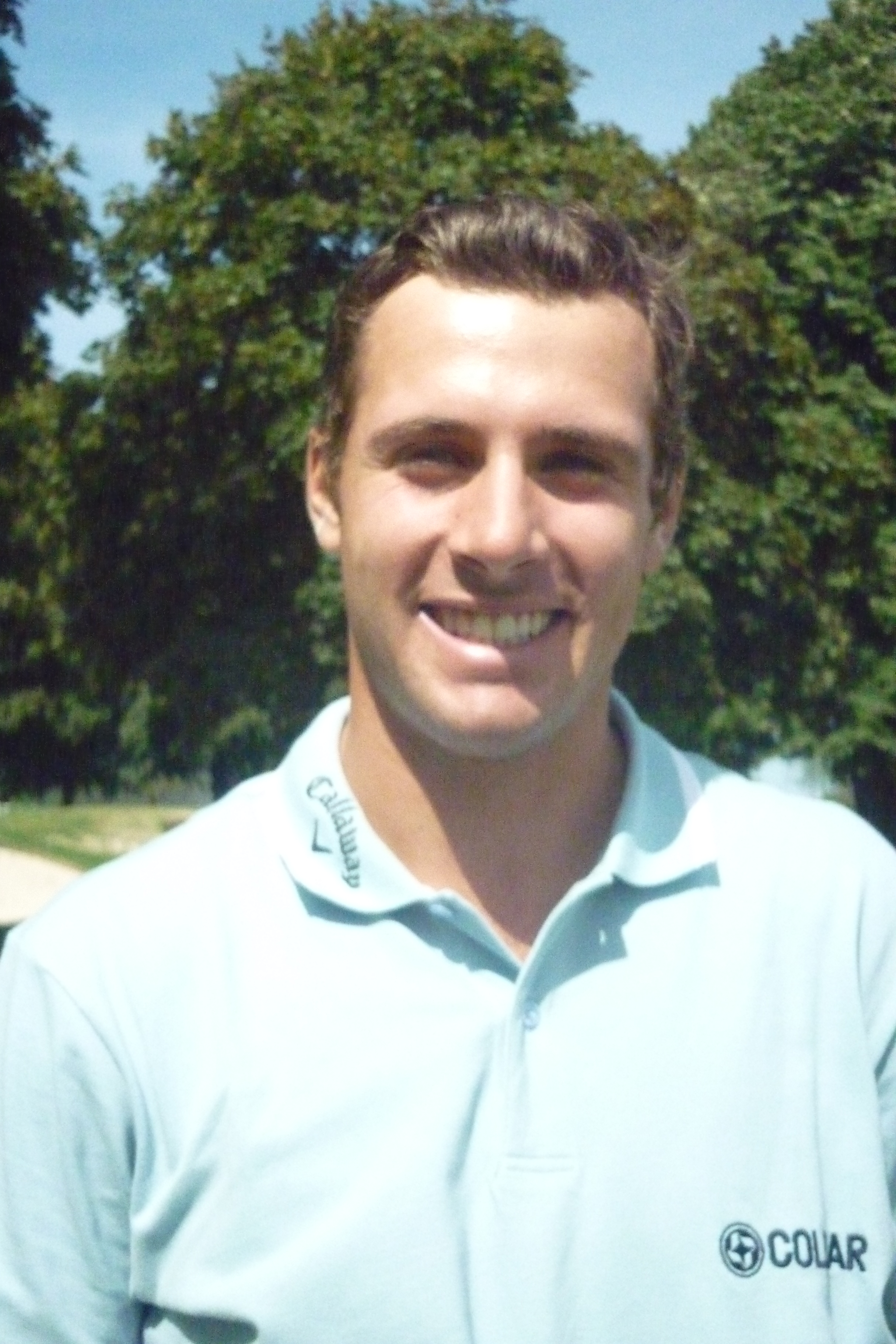

Personal information
- Nationality: Italy
- Born: 27 April 1989 (age 37) Rome, Italy
- Height: 6 ft 2 in (1.88 m)
- Weight: 195 lb (88 kg; 13.9 st)
- Spouse: Audra Woods (m. 2014)
- Children: 3

Career
- Sport: Golf
- College: Texas A&M University
- Turned professional: 2010
- Current tour: European Tour
- Former tour: Challenge Tour
- Professional wins: 8
- Highest ranking: 65 (29 September 2019)

Number of wins by tour
- European Tour: 2
- Challenge Tour: 5 (Tied-8th all-time)
- Other: 1

Best results in major championships
- Masters Tournament: DNP
- PGA Championship: DNP
- U.S. Open: CUT: 2014, 2025
- The Open Championship: CUT: 2019

Achievements and awards
- Challenge Tour Rankings winner: 2013

Andrea Pavan (born 27 April 1989) is an Italian professional golfer who currently plays on the European Tour. He has won twice on the European Tour, the 2018 D+D Real Czech Masters and the 2019 BMW International Open.

== Amateur career ==
Pavan won the Italian Amateur Strokeplay Championship in 2005 at the age of 16, and subsequently opted to join the collegiate circuit in the USA. He spent four years studying at Texas A&M enjoying a successful career on the golf team, including winning a collegiate event in 2010 and being part of the team which won the 2009 NCAA Men's Golf Championship. He also enjoyed success in Europe, winning further events in his home country and finishing runner-up in the prestigious European Amateur.

== Professional career ==
Pavan turned professional in 2010. Having failed to come through qualifying school for either the European or PGA Tours, he relied on invites to the second-tier Challenge Tour in 2011. A runner-up finish at the Kärnten Golf Open, where he had been the longtime leader, secured him full-time status at that level. He enjoyed further success, leading the Credit Suisse Challenge at the halfway stage before a final round 86, before claiming his first professional victory at the Norwegian Challenge. He won again at the season-end Challenge Tour Grand Final to secure his place on the European Tour for 2012.

Pavan had an unsuccessful first season on the European Tour, only making the cut in 8 tournaments. He returned to the Challenge Tour in 2013, winning twice in the Bad Griesbach Challenge Tour and the Open Blue Green Côtes d'Armor Bretagne. He led the Order of Merit and returned to the European Tour for 2014.

2014, Pavan's second season on the European Tour, was more successful with four top-10 finishes. He retained his playing rights for 2015 by finishing in the top-25 in the European Tour Q School at the end of the season. 2015 was again unsuccessful, and he returned to the Challenge Tour for 2016. Pavan played on the Challenge Tour in 2016 and 2017 before returning to the main tour through the 2017 Q-School, where he tied for second place.

2018 was easily Pavan's best season on the European Tour. He had his first European Tour win at the 2018 D+D Real Czech Masters and finished 34th in the Order of Merit. In 2019, Pavan won the BMW International Open beating Matt Fitzpatrick at the second hole of a sudden-death playoff.

In 2023, Pavan competed on the Challenge Tour, finishing eighth on the points list to earn his 2024 European Tour card.

== Personal life ==
In February 2026, Pavan was involved in an accident where he fell down a lift shaft in South Africa, before the first round of the Investec South African Open Championship. He fell three floors, suffering multiple injuries before being taken to hospital.

== Amateur wins ==
- 2005 Italian Amateur Strokeplay Championship
- 2006 Italian Omnium
- 2007 Italian Amateur Strokeplay Championship
- 2010 John Burns Intercollegiate

== Professional wins (8) ==
=== European Tour wins (2) ===
No.	Date	Tournament	Winning score	Margin of victory	Runner-up
1	26 Aug 2018	D+D Real Czech Masters	−22 (65-69-65-67=266)	2 strokes	(Republic of Ireland) Pádraig Harrington
2	23 Jun 2019	BMW International Open	−15 (66-71-70-66=273)	Playoff	(England) Matt Fitzpatrick

European Tour playoff record (1–0)

No.	Year	Tournament	Opponent	Result
1	2019	BMW International Open	(England) Matt Fitzpatrick	Won with birdie on second extra hole

=== Challenge Tour wins (5) ===
Legend
Grand Finals (1)
Other Challenge Tour (4)

No.	Date	Tournament	Winning score	Margin of victory	Runner(s)-up
1	14 Aug 2011	Norwegian Challenge	−9 (70-71-68-70=279)	Playoff	(Austria) Florian Praegant
2	5 Nov 2011	Apulia San Domenico Grand Final	−17 (66-65-65-71=267)	1 stroke	(England) Tommy Fleetwood
3	7 Jul 2013	Bad Griesbach Challenge Tour	−19 (68-67-66-68=269)	1 stroke	(Italy) Marco Crespi
4	8 Sep 2013	Open Blue Green Côtes d'Armor Bretagne	−11 (64-65-68-72=269)	4 strokes	(Wales) Rhys Davies, (England) Robert Dinwiddie
5	4 Jun 2023	D+D Real Czech Challenge	−18 (67-69-65-69=270)	1 stroke	(South Africa) Casey Jarvis

Challenge Tour playoff record (1–1)

No.	Year	Tournament	Opponent(s)	Result
1	2011	Norwegian Challenge	(Austria) Florian Praegant	Won with birdie on third extra hole
2	2023	Challenge de España	(France) Martin Couvra (a), (Northern Ireland) Dermot McElroy	Couvra won with par on second extra hole Pavan eliminated by par on first hole

=== Other wins (1) ===
- 2006 Italian National Open

== Results in major championships ==
Tournament	2014	2015	2016	2017	2018
Masters Tournament					
U.S. Open	CUT				
The Open Championship					
PGA Championship					

Tournament	2019	2020	2021	2022	2023	2024	2025
Masters Tournament							
PGA Championship							
U.S. Open							CUT
The Open Championship	CUT						

Did not play

CUT = missed the halfway cut

== Results in World Golf Championships ==
Tournament	2018	2019
Championship		
Match Play		
Invitational		
Champions	T22	T49

Did not play

"T" = Tied

== Team appearances ==
Amateur

- European Boys' Team Championship (representing Italy): 2004, 2005, 2007
- Jacques Léglise Trophy (representing Continental Europe): 2004, 2005 (winners), 2006 (winners)
- European Youths' Team Championship (representing Italy): 2006
- European Amateur Team Championship (representing Italy): 2007, 2008, 2009, 2010
- Eisenhower Trophy (representing Italy): 2008, 2010
- St Andrews Trophy (representing the Continent of Europe): 2008
- Palmer Cup (representing Europe): 2009 (winners), 2010

Professional

- World Cup (representing Italy): 2018

== See also ==
- 2011 Challenge Tour graduates
- 2013 Challenge Tour graduates
- 2014 European Tour Qualifying School graduates
- 2017 European Tour Qualifying School graduates
- 2023 Challenge Tour graduates
- List of golfers with most Challenge Tour wins
