= Borja Virto =

Spanish professional golfer

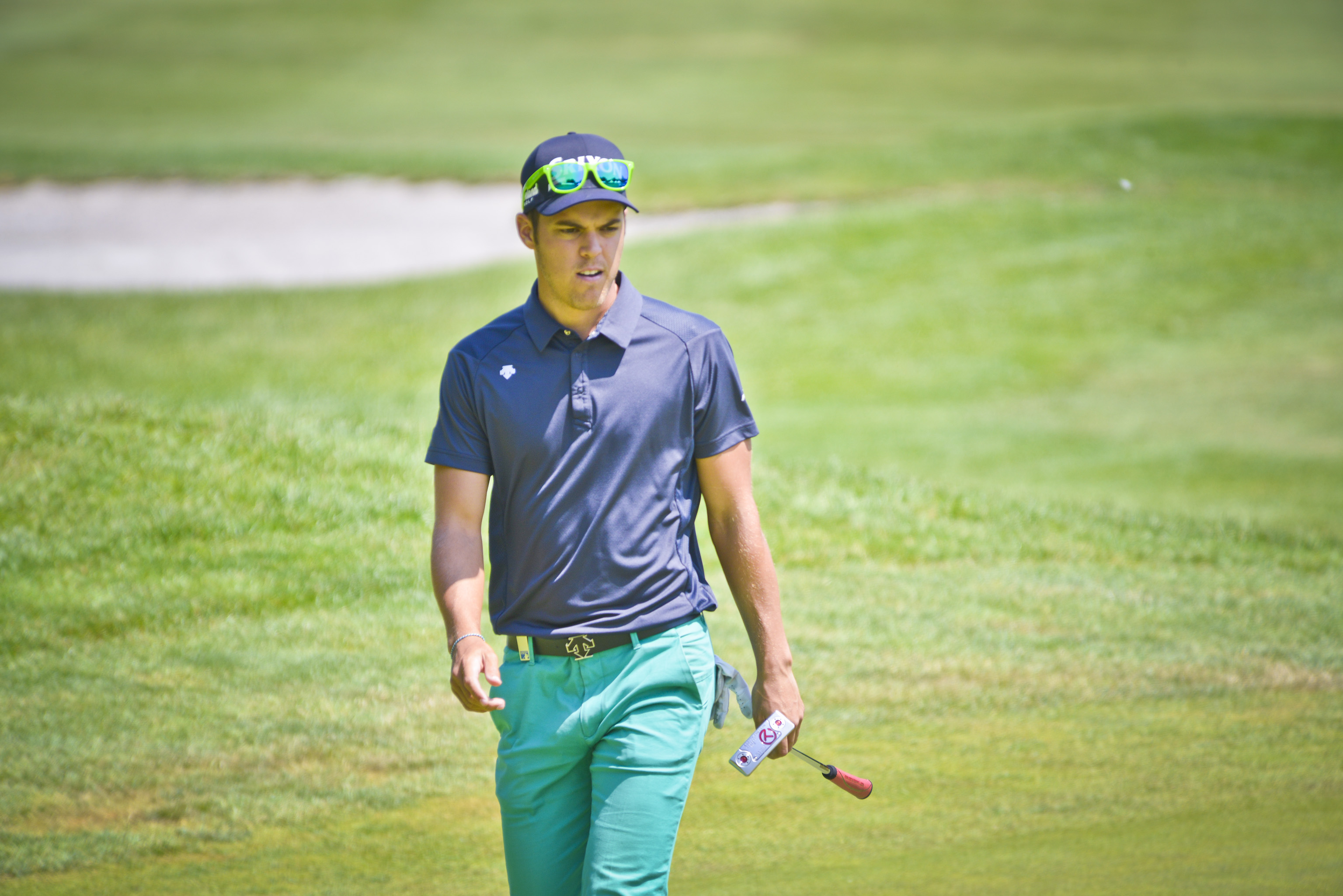
- Virto in 2016

Personal information
- Full name: Borja Virto Astudillo
- Nationality: Spain
- Born: 4 February 1991 (age 35) Pamplona, Spain
- Height: 1.78 m (5 ft 10 in)
- Weight: 69 kg (152 lb; 10.9 st)

Career
- Sport: Golf
- College: Iowa State University
- Turned professional: 2013
- Current tour: Challenge Tour
- Former tours: European Tour; Alps Tour
- Professional wins: 4

Number of wins by tour
- Challenge Tour: 2
- Other: 2

Borja Virto Astudillo (born 4 February 1991) is a Spanish professional golfer.

== Amateur career ==
Virto played college golf at Iowa State University for two years.

== Professional career ==
Virto played on the Alps Tour in 2014, winning twice, and finishing fourth on the Order of Merit. This finish secured him a Challenge Tour card for 2015 but he finished T-18 at the 2014 European Tour Qualifying School (after starting at the second stage) to earn his European Tour card for 2015.

He split time between both tours in 2015 and won on the Challenge Tour at the D+D Real Slovakia Challenge in July and The Foshan Open in October. He finished 2015 in third place on the Challenge Tour, earning a place on the European Tour for 2016.

== Amateur wins ==
- 2009 Spanish Under 18 Championship

== Professional wins (4) ==
=== Challenge Tour wins (2) ===
No.	Date	Tournament	Winning score	Margin of victory	Runner-up
1	12 Jul 2015	D+D Real Slovakia Challenge	−17 (69-67-69-66=271)	1 stroke	(Portugal) Ricardo Gouveia
2	25 Oct 2015	Foshan Open	−15 (64-67-72-70=273)	2 strokes	(Sweden) Björn Åkesson

=== Alps Tour wins (2) ===
No.	Date	Tournament	Winning score	Margin of victory	Runner(s)-up
1	28 Jun 2014	Alps de Las Castillas	−8 (68-66-71=205)	3 strokes	(Spain) Borja Etchart
2	5 Sep 2014	Open La Pinetina – Memorial Giorgio Bordoni	−12 (65-64-69=198)	1 stroke	(Spain) Carlos Balmaseda, (Italy) Federico Maccario, (England) Tom Shadbolt

== Team appearances ==
Amateur

- European Boys' Team Championship (representing Spain): 2008, 2009
- European Amateur Team Championship (representing Spain): 2013

== See also ==
- 2014 European Tour Qualifying School graduates
- 2015 Challenge Tour graduates
