= Bad Griesbach Challenge Tour =

Aegean Airlines Challenge Tour
Tournament information
- Location: Bad Griesbach, Germany
- Established: 2013
- Course: Hartl Resort
- Par: 71
- Length: 7,189 yards (6,574 m)
- Tour: Challenge Tour
- Format: Stroke play
- Prize fund: €170,000
- Month played: July
- Final year: 2015

Tournament record score
- Aggregate: 269 Andrea Pavan (2013); 269 Ricardo Gouveia (2015)
- To par: −19 Andrea Pavan (2013)

Final champion
- (Portugal) Ricardo Gouveia
- Location in Germany Location in Bavaria

The Bad Griesbach Challenge Tour was a golf tournament on the Challenge Tour. It was played for the first time in July 2013 at the Hartl Resort in Bad Griesbach, Germany.

Andrea Pavan won the inaugural tournament.

== Winners ==
Year	Winner	Score	To par	Margin of victory	Runner-up
Aegean Airlines Challenge Tour
2015	(Portugal) Ricardo Gouveia	269	−15	4 strokes	(South Africa) Dean Burmester
2014	(South Africa) Jake Roos	275	−13	2 strokes	(England) Jason Barnes
Bad Griesbach Challenge Tour
2013	(Italy) Andrea Pavan	269	−19	1 stroke	(Italy) Marco Crespi
