= 2008 PGA EuroPro Tour =

Golf tour season

2008 PGA EuroPro Tour season
- Duration: 30 April 2008 – 22 October 2008
- Number of official events: 14
- Most wins: (England) Dale Marmion (2)
- Order of Merit: (Republic of Ireland) Noel Fox

The 2008 PGA EuroPro Tour, titled as the 2008 Ivobank PGA EuroPro Tour for sponsorship reasons, was the seventh season of the PGA EuroPro Tour, a third-tier tour recognised by the European Tour.

== Ivobank title sponsorship ==
In June, it was announced that the tour had signed a title sponsorship agreement with online banking service Ivobank, being renamed as the Ivobank PGA EuroPro Tour.

== Schedule ==
The following table lists official events during the 2008 season.

Date	Tournament	Location	Purse (£)	Winner (Note: The number in brackets after each winner's name is the number of PGA EuroPro Tour events they had won up to and including that tournament. It is rare for someone to accumulate many wins on the PGA EuroPro Tour as success at this level usually leads to promotion to the Challenge Tour.)
2 May	Wensum Valley International Open	Norfolk	40,000	(England) Seve Benson (1)
9 May	Sureshot Classic	Hertfordshire	40,000	(Republic of Ireland) Brian McElhinney (2)
16 May	Ivobank UK Masters	Northamptonshire	40,000	(Republic of Ireland) Alan Murray (1)
23 May	Faithlegg Irish Championship	Ireland	40,000	(Republic of Ireland) Noel Fox (1)
20 Jun	Bovey Castle Championship	Devon	40,000	(Republic of Ireland) Simon Thornton (1)
27 Jun	Stoke by Nayland Championship	Suffolk	40,000	(England) Nicky Harris (1)
17 Jul	Yes! Classic	Bristol	40,000	(England) Dale Marmion (1)
25 Jul	Oceânico Algarve Championship	Portugal	40,000	(Portugal) Ricardo Santos (1)
8 Aug	Selsdon Park Masters	Greater London	40,000	(England) Lloyd Kennedy (2)
15 Aug	Whittlebury Park Classic	Northamptonshire	40,000	(England) Dale Marmion (2)
22 Aug	Partypoker.com Players Championship	East Sussex	40,000	(Australia) Daniel Gaunt (3)
4 Sep	Brooks Brothers Classic	Essex	40,000	(England) Matt Ford (1)
25 Sep	Ladbrokescasino.com Masters	Spain	40,000	(England) John Parry (1)
22 Oct	Les Bordes Tour Championship	France	70,000	(England) Robert Steele (1)

== Order of Merit ==
The Order of Merit was based on prize money won during the season, calculated in Pound sterling. The top five players on the Order of Merit earned status to play on the 2009 Challenge Tour.

Position	Player	Prize money (£)	Status earned
1	(Republic of Ireland) Noel Fox	26,897	Promoted to Challenge Tour
2	(England) Dale Marmion	26,362	Promoted to Challenge Tour
3	(England) Lloyd Kennedy	25,419	Promoted to Challenge Tour
4	(Republic of Ireland) Alan Murray	25,345	Promoted to Challenge Tour
5	(England) Robert Steele	24,760	Promoted to Challenge Tour
6	(England) Matt Ford	23,343	
7	(England) Nicky Harris	21,079	
8	(Australia) Daniel Gaunt	14,925	
9	(Republic of Ireland) Simon Thornton	14,871	
10	(England) John Parry	13,258	
