= Jens Fahrbring =

Swedish professional golfer (born 1984)

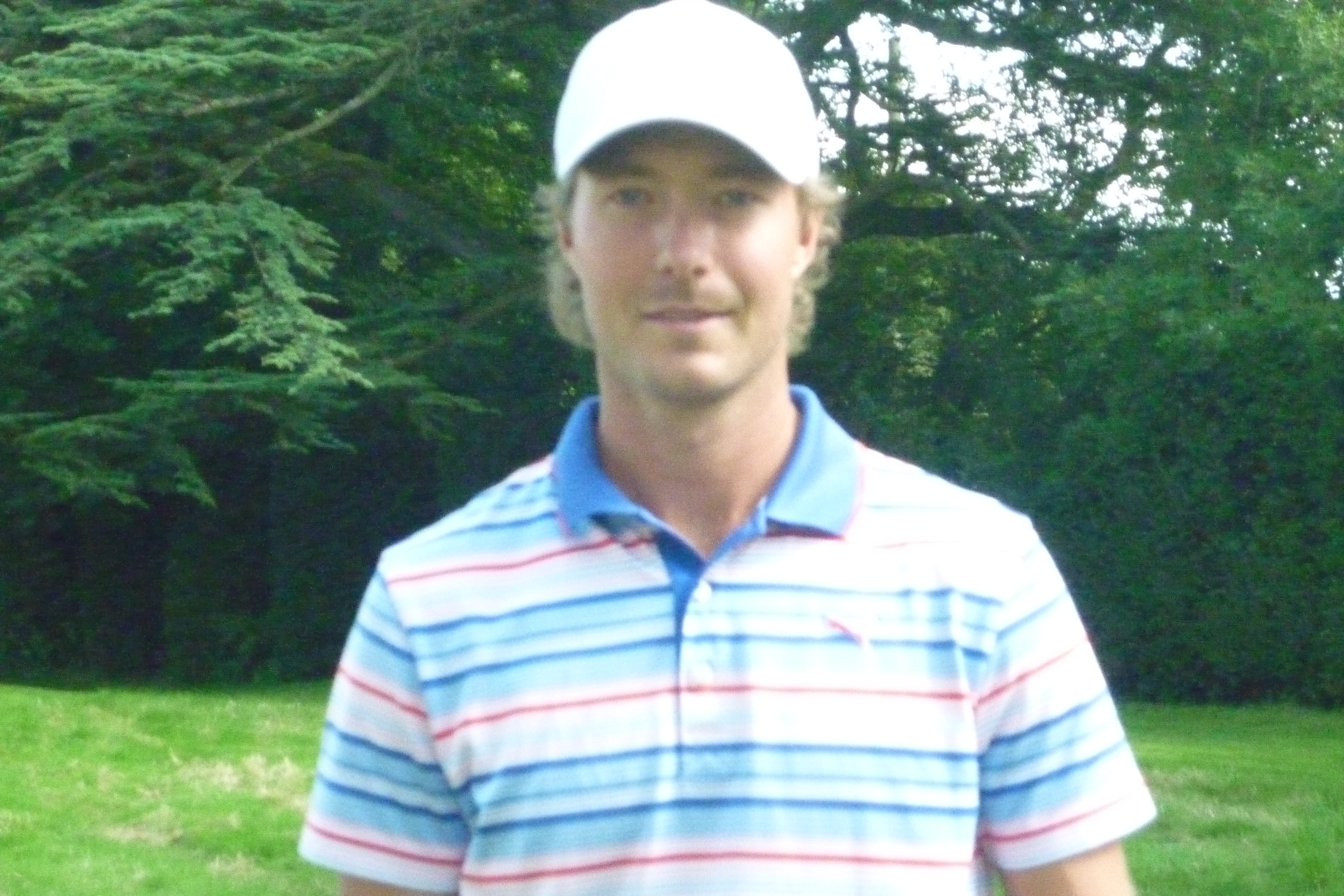

Personal information
- Nationality: Sweden
- Born: 20 April 1984 (age 42) Sollentuna, Sweden
- Height: 1.80 m (5 ft 11 in)
- Weight: 74 kg (163 lb; 11.7 st)

Career
- Sport: Golf
- College: Virginia Commonwealth University
- Turned professional: 2007
- Former tours: European Tour; Challenge Tour; Nordic Golf League
- Professional wins: 3

Number of wins by tour
- Challenge Tour: 2
- Other: 1

Jens Fahrbring (born 20 April 1984) is a Swedish professional golfer and former European Tour player. He recorded top-3 finishes at the Open d'Italia, South African Open and Open de España. On the Challenge Tour he won the Norwegian Challenge and D+D Real Czech Challenge.

== Amateur career ==
Fahrbring played college golf at Virginia Commonwealth University in the United States.

== Professional career ==
Fahrbring turned professional in 2007 and played on the Nordic Golf League from 2007 to 2012. He finished third on the 2012 rankings which earned him his 2013 Challenge Tour card. In August 2013, he won his first Challenge Tour event, the Norwegian Challenge.

In 2015, Fahrbring won the D+D Real Czech Challenge and tied for third at the Kazakhstan Open, to finishing 10th amongst the Challenge Tour graduates. He shared the half-way lead at the Open d'Italia, ultimately finishing third, one stroke away from joining the playoff between Rikard Karlberg and Martin Kaymer. On the 2016 European Tour his best finish was 12th in the Portugal Masters, and he went through Q School to regain his card. In 2017 he was fifth at the Porsche European Open, but finished 126th in the season rankings.

Back on the Challenge Tour, Fahrbring lost a playoff at the 2018 Barclays Kenya Open, and in 2020 he was third at the Northern Ireland Open.

Fahrbring came through Q-School again to join the 2023 European Tour, where he was in contention almost immediately at the South African Open. After an opening round of 65 he played in the final group on Sunday and ultimately finished third, two strokes behind winner Thriston Lawrence. He made a hole-in-one on his way to a tie for third at the 2024 Acciona Open de España in Madrid, behind Jon Rahm and Ángel Hidalgo.

Fahrbring announced his retirement from tour golf following the 2025 season and became a teaching pro at his club, Sollentuna Golf Club.

== Professional wins (3) ==
=== Challenge Tour wins (2) ===
No.	Date	Tournament	Winning score	Margin of victory	Runner(s)-up
1	11 Aug 2013	Norwegian Challenge	−19 (69-72-62-66=269)	3 strokes	(United States) Daniel Im, (Sweden) Pontus Widegren
2	31 May 2015	D+D Real Czech Challenge	−17 (66-70-67-68=271)	1 stroke	(England) Ross McGowan

Challenge Tour playoff record (0–1)

No.	Year	Tournament	Opponent	Result
1	2018	Barclays Kenya Open	(Italy) Lorenzo Gagli	Lost to par on third extra hole

=== Nordic Golf League wins (1) ===
No.	Date	Tournament	Winning score	Margin of victory	Runners-up
1	23 Mar 2012	Mediter Real Estate Masters	−13 (69-68-69=203)	4 strokes	(Sweden) Joakim Rask, (Sweden) Tobias Rosendahl

== See also ==
- 2015 Challenge Tour graduates
- 2016 European Tour Qualifying School graduates
- 2022 European Tour Qualifying School graduates
