= Matt Ford (golfer) =

English professional golfer

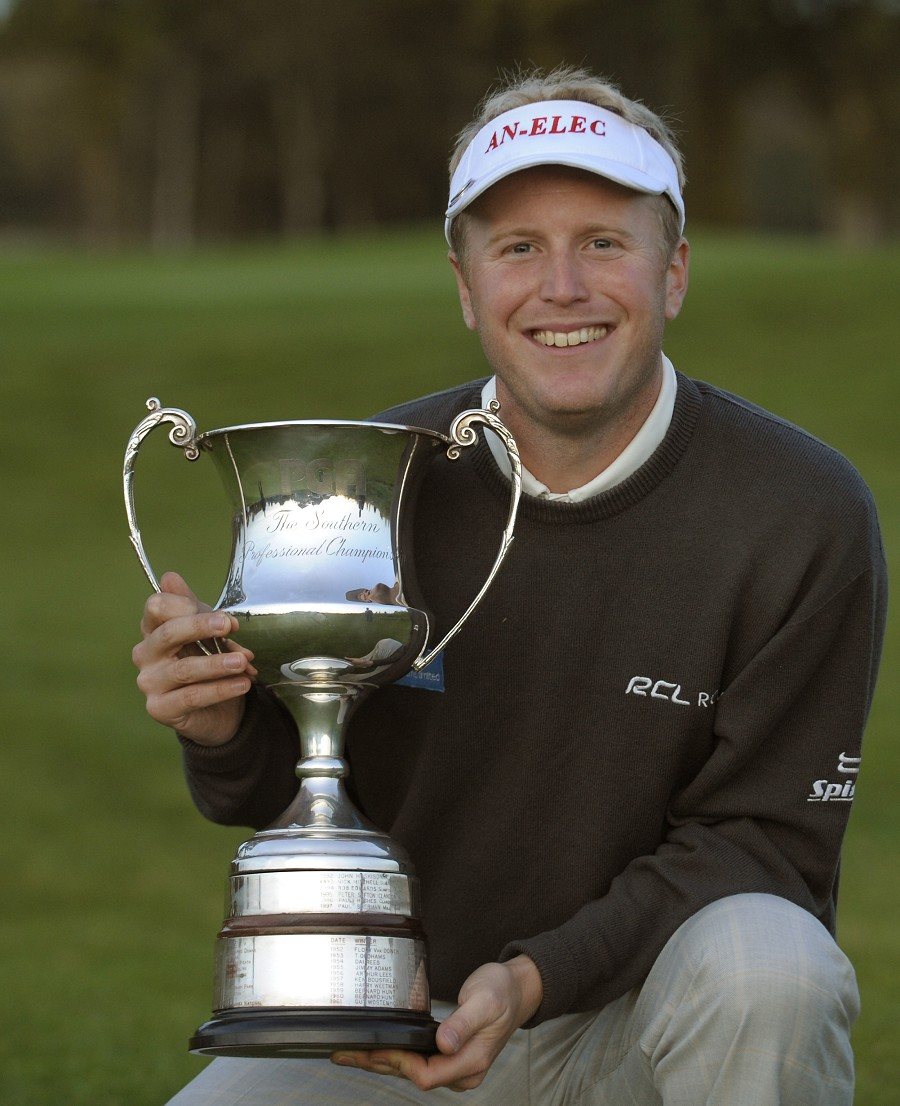

Personal information
- Full name: Matthew James Ford
- Nationality: England
- Born: 19 April 1978 (age 48) Swindon, England
- Height: 1.75 m (5 ft 9 in)

Career
- Sport: Golf
- Turned professional: 2004
- Current tour: Challenge Tour
- Former tours: European Tour; PGA EuroPro Tour
- Professional wins: 2

Best results in major championships
- Masters Tournament: DNP
- PGA Championship: DNP
- U.S. Open: DNP
- The Open Championship: CUT: 2022

Matthew James Ford (born 19 April 1978) is an English professional golfer. Ford has played mostly on the Challenge Tour except for two seasons, 2015 and 2016, when he played on the European Tour.

== Professional career ==
Ford qualified for the European Tour after finishing fourth in the 2014 European Tour qualifying school. He had a good start to 2015, finishing second in the Africa Open in March. He finished the season at 105th in the Order of Merit to retain his card for 2016. However he finished 131st in the Order of Merit in 2016 and returned to the Challenge Tour.

Except for his two season on the European Tour, Ford has played on the Challenge Tour since 2010. He has not won the tour but has been runner-up four times. In October 2020 he lost in a playoff for the Italian Challenge Open Eneos Motor Oil after Hurly Long made a birdie at the second extra hole. The following week he won the PGA Professional Championship at Trentham Golf Club with a score of 269, 19 under par, winning by 7 strokes.

== Personal life ==
Ford is the son of former professional footballer and manager Andy Ford.

== Professional wins (2) ==
=== PGA EuroPro Tour wins (1) ===
No.	Date	Tournament	Winning score	Margin of victory	Runners-up
1	4 Sep 2008	Brooks Brothers Classic	−8 (67-68-70=205)	2 strokes	(South Africa) Jacques Blaauw (a), (Republic of Ireland) Alan Murray

=== Other wins (1) ===
- 2020 PGA Professional Championship

== Playoff record ==
Challenge Tour playoff record (0–1)

No.	Year	Tournament	Opponents	Result
1	2020	Italian Challenge Open Eneos Motor Oil	(Germany) Hurly Long, (Germany) Marcel Schneider	Long won with birdie on second extra hole Schneider eliminated by par on first hole

== Results in major championships ==
Tournament	2022
Masters Tournament	
PGA Championship	
U.S. Open	
The Open Championship	CUT

Did not play

CUT = missed the half-way cut

== Team appearances ==
Professional

- PGA Cup (representing Great Britain and Ireland): 2026 (winners)

== See also ==
- 2014 European Tour Qualifying School graduates
