= Eduardo de la Riva =

Spanish golfer

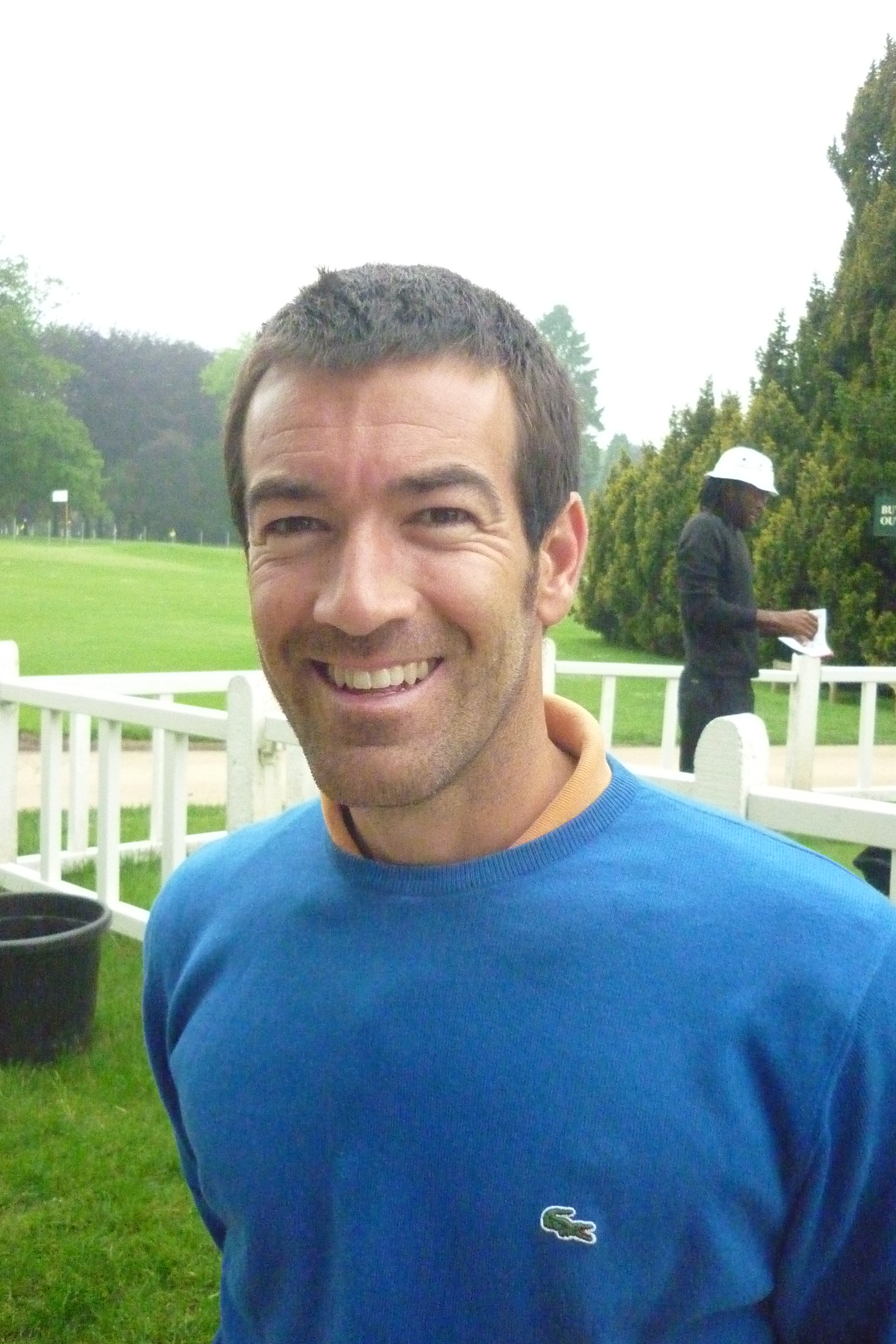

Personal information
- Nationality: Spain
- Born: 11 June 1982 (age 44) Barcelona, Spain
- Height: 1.70 m (5 ft 7 in)
- Weight: 65 kg (143 lb; 10.2 st)

Career
- Sport: Golf
- Turned professional: 2001
- Current tour: Challenge Tour
- Former tour: European Tour
- Professional wins: 2

Number of wins by tour
- Challenge Tour: 1
- Other: 1

Best results in major championships
- Masters Tournament: DNP
- PGA Championship: DNP
- U.S. Open: DNP
- The Open Championship: T15: 2013

Eduardo de la Riva (born 11 June 1982) is a Spanish professional golfer.

== Career ==
In 2001, De la Riva turned professional. He joined the European Tour via qualifying school for 2003, but failed to keep his card. Since then, he has played mainly on the Challenge Tour, occasionally qualifying for local European Tour events. His best position on the European Tour was T-2, three times. In 2011, de la Riva won the Order of Merit on the Peugeot Tour, a Spanish national golf tour. On the Challenge Tour, he won the 2012 Fred Olsen Challenge de España.

== Amateur wins ==
- Spanish Under 12 Championship
- Spanish Boys Championship (twice)
- Spanish Junior Championship (twice)

== Professional wins (2) ==
=== Challenge Tour wins (1) ===
No.	Date	Tournament	Winning score	Margin of victory	Runner-up
1	3 Jun 2012	Fred Olsen Challenge de España	−19 (68-63-69-65=265)	1 stroke	(England) Simon Wakefield

=== Other wins (1) ===
- 2002 one Peugeot Oki Tour event

== Playoff record ==
European Tour playoff record (0–1)

No.	Year	Tournament	Opponents	Result
1	2012	Nelson Mandela Championship	(Scotland) Scott Jamieson, (England) Steve Webster	Jamieson won with par on second extra hole de la Riva eliminated by par on first hole

== Results in major championships ==
Tournament	2013
Masters Tournament	
U.S. Open	
The Open Championship	T15
PGA Championship	

Did not play

CUT = missed the half-way cut
"T" = tied

== Team appearances ==
Amateur

- Eisenhower Trophy (representing Spain): 2000
- Jacques Léglise Trophy (representing the Continent of Europe): 2000

== See also ==
- 2012 European Tour Qualifying School graduates
- 2014 European Tour Qualifying School graduates
