= 2013 Challenge Tour =

Golf tour season

2013 Challenge Tour season
- Duration: 31 January 2013 – 3 November 2013
- Number of official events: 25
- Most wins: (United States) Brooks Koepka (3)
- Rankings: (Italy) Andrea Pavan

The 2013 Challenge Tour was the 25th season of the Challenge Tour, the official development tour to the European Tour.

== Schedule ==
The following table lists official events during the 2013 season.

Date	Tournament	Host country	Purse (€)	Winner (Note: The number in brackets after each winner's name is the number of Challenge Tour events they had won up to and including that tournament. This information is only shown for Challenge Tour members. It is rare for someone to accumulate many wins on the Challenge Tour as success at this level usually leads to promotion to the European Tour.)	OWGR points	Other tours (Note: EUR − European Tour; PGTI − Professional Golf Tour of India.)	Notes
3 Feb	Gujarat Kensville Challenge	India	200,000	(India) Shiv Kapur (1)	12	PGTI	
17 Feb	Barclays Kenya Open	Kenya	195,000	(Spain) Jordi García Pinto (1)	12		
28 Apr	Challenge de Madrid	Spain	160,000	(France) François Calmels (2)	12		New tournament
5 May	Montecchia Golf Open	Italy	160,000	(United States) Brooks Koepka (2)	12		
19 May	Madeira Islands Open - Portugal - BPI	Portugal	600,000	(United States) Peter Uihlein (1)	18	EUR	
26 May	Telenet Trophy	Belgium	160,000	(Australia) Daniel Gaunt (2)	12		
2 Jun	Fred Olsen Challenge de España	Spain	160,000	(United States) Brooks Koepka (3)	12		
9 Jun	D+D Real Czech Challenge Open	Czech Republic	160,000	(France) François Calmels (3)	12		
16 Jun	Najeti Hotels et Golfs Open	France	500,000	(Republic of Ireland) Simon Thornton (1)	18	EUR	
23 Jun	Scottish Hydro Challenge	Scotland	220,000	(United States) Brooks Koepka (4) (Note: Koepka earned immediate promotion to the European Tour, as this was his third win of the season.)	12		
30 Jun	Kärnten Golf Open	Austria	160,000	(South Africa) Dylan Frittelli (1)	12		
7 Jul	Bad Griesbach Challenge Tour	Germany	170,000	(Italy) Andrea Pavan (3)	12		New tournament
14 Jul	Swiss Challenge	Switzerland	160,000	(France) Victor Riu (1)	12		
21 Jul	Mugello Tuscany Open	Italy	160,000	(Italy) Marco Crespi (2)	12		
28 Jul	Le Vaudreuil Golf Challenge	France	180,000	(United States) Brinson Paolini (1)	12		New tournament
4 Aug	Finnish Challenge	Finland	170,000	(Wales) Stuart Manley (1)	12		
11 Aug	Norwegian Challenge	Norway	175,000	(Sweden) Jens Fahrbring (1)	12		
25 Aug	Rolex Trophy	Switzerland	230,000	(Sweden) Jens Dantorp (1)	12		
1 Sep	Northern Ireland Open Challenge	Northern Ireland	170,000	(Netherlands) Daan Huizing (1)	12		New to Challenge Tour
8 Sep	Open Blue Green Côtes d'Armor Bretagne	France	180,000	(Italy) Andrea Pavan (4)	12		
15 Sep	Kharkov Superior Cup	Ukraine	200,000	(Netherlands) Daan Huizing (2)	12		New tournament
22 Sep	Kazakhstan Open	Kazakhstan	400,000	(Sweden) Johan Carlsson (1)	12		
20 Oct	Foshan Open	China	US$350,000	(Spain) Nacho Elvira (1)	12		New tournament
27 Oct	National Bank of Oman Golf Classic	Oman	US$300,000	(Finland) Roope Kakko (2)	12		New tournament
3 Nov	Dubai Festival City Challenge Tour Grand Final	UAE	US$330,000	(India) Shiv Kapur (2)	16		Flagship event

== Rankings ==
The rankings were based on prize money won during the season, calculated in Euros. The top 15 players on the rankings earned status to play on the 2014 European Tour.

Rank	Player	Prize money (€)
1	(Italy) Andrea Pavan	147,811
2	(Portugal) José-Filipe Lima	123,697
3	(United States) Brooks Koepka	119,423
4	(India) Shiv Kapur	118,323
5	(Sweden) Johan Carlsson	113,066
