= 2011 European Amateur Team Championship =

Golf competition

Tournament information
- Dates: 5–9 July 2011
- Location: Vilamoura, Algarve, Portugal; 37°4′40″N 8°6′55″W
- Course: Oceânico Golf (Victoria Course)
- Organized by: European Golf Association
- Format: Qualification round: 36 holes stroke play Knock-out match-play

Statistics
- Par: 72
- Length: 7,174 yards (6,560 m)
- Field: 20 teams 120 players

Champion
- France; Cyril Bouniol, Julien Brun, Édouard España, Sébastien Gros, Alexander Lévy, Gary Stal
- Qualification round: 702 (−18); Final match: 4 1/2–2 1/2

Location map
- Location in Europe Location i Portugal

The 2011 European Amateur Team Championship took place 5–9 July at Oceânico Golf in Vilamoura, Algarve, Portugal on its Victoria Course. It was the 29th men's golf European Amateur Team Championship.

== Venue ==
The course was designed by Arnold Palmer and opened in 2004. In 2016, Dom Pedro Golf acquired the Victoria Course and four other Vilamoura courses from Oceânico Golf.

== Format ==
Each team consisted of 6 players, playing two rounds of stroke-play over two days, counting the five best scores each day for each team.

The eight best teams formed flight A, in knock-out match-play over the next three days. The teams were seeded based on their positions after the stroke play. The first placed team was drawn to play the quarter final against the eight placed team, the second against the seventh, the third against the sixth and the fourth against the fifth. Teams were allowed to use six players during the team matches, selecting four of them in the two morning foursome games and five players in to the afternoon single games. Teams knocked out after the quarter finals were allowed to play one foursome game and four single games in each of their remaining matches. Games all square at the 18th hole were declared halved, if the team match was already decided.

The eight teams placed 9–16 in the qualification stroke-play formed flight B, to play similar knock-out play, with one foursome game and four single games in each match, to decide their final positions.

The four teams placed 17–20 formed flight C, to play each other in a round-robin system, with one foursome game and four single games in each match, to decide their final positions.

== Teams ==
20 nation teams contested the event, the same number of teams as at the previous event one year earlier. Russia took part for the first time. Each team consisted of six players.

Players in the teams

Country	Players
Austria	Hamza Amin, Philipp Fendt, Tono Kromer, Lukas Nemecz, Manuel Trappel, Christoph Weninger
Belgium	Xavier Feyaerts, Thomas Pieters, Cedric Van Wassenhove, Julien Richelle, Kevin Hesbois, Nick Ver Elst
Denmark	Lucas Bjerregaard, Victor Henum, Mads Søgaard, Nicolai Kristensen, Thomas Sørensen, Sebastian Cappelen
England	Stiggy Hodgson, Jack Senior, Andy Sullivan, Darren Wright, Dave Coupland, Steven Brown
Finland	Tapio Pulkkanen, Tuomas Salminen, Toni Hakula, Niclas Hellberg, Miro Veijalainen, Roope Kangas
France	Cyril Bouniol, Julien Brun, Édouard España, Sébastien Gros, Alexander Lévy, Gary Stal
Germany	Benedict Staben, Moritz Lampert, Sebastien Kannler, Stephan Jäger, Marcel Schneider, Philipp Westermann
Iceland	Axel Bóasson, Arnar Hakonarson, Gudjonn Hilmarsson, Guðmundur Kristjánsson, Alfred Brynjar Kristinsson, Ólafur Loftsson
Ireland	Paul Cutler, Kevin Phelan, Alan Dunbar, Eoin Arthurs, Pat Murray, Paul Dunne
Italy	Filippo Berganaschi, Francesco Laporta, Mattia Miloro, Leonardo Motto, Niccolò Quintarelli, Filippo Zuchetti
Netherlands	Dylan Boshart, Bernard Geelkerken, Daan Huizing, Robin Kind, Frank Van Hoof, Willem Vork
Norway	Mikkel Bjerch-Andresen, Vilhelm Bogstrand, Andres Engell, Joakim Mikkelsen, Thomas Guste Pedersen, Ole Ramsnes
Portugal	Ricardo Gouveia, Pedro Figueiredo, Gonçalo Pinto, José Maria Jóia Miguel Gaspar, Tiago Rodrigues
Russia	Vasily Belov, Vladimir Osipov Pavel Goryainov, Mikhail Morozov, Nikita Ponomarev, Evgeny Volkov
Scotland	James Byrne, Ross Kellett, David Law, Kris Nicol, Greg Paterson, Michael Stewart
Slovakia	Maros Karnis, Stefan Palenik, Martin Tavoda, Peter Valasek, Samo Valuch, Juraj Zvarik
Spain	Scott Fernandez, Adrian Otaegui, Nacho Elvira, Antonio Hortal, Juan Francisco Sarasti, Oliver Mena
Sweden	Pontus Widegren, Sebastian Söderberg, Pontus Gad, Nils Florén, Robert S. Karlsson, Niclas Carlsson
Switzerland	Marc Dobias, Benjamim Rusch, Arthur Gabella, Edouard Amacher, Victor Doka, Marco Iten
Wales	Rhys Enoch, Oliver Farr, James Frazer, Rhys Pugh, Ben Westgate, Joe Vickery

== Winners ==
Leader of the opening 36-hole competition was team Spain, with a 24-under-par score of 696. Defending champions England did not make it to the quarter finals, finishing ninth in the qualifying round.

There was no official award for the lowest individual score, but individual leader was Scott Fernandez, Spain, with a 9-under-par score of 135, two strokes ahead of Adrián Otaegui, Spain and Thomas Pieters, Belgium.

Team France won the gold medal, earning their first title, beating team Switzerland in the final 4 1/2–2 1/2.

Team Sweden, earned the bronze on third place, after beating Germany 4–3 in the bronze match.

== Results ==
Qualification round

Team standings

Place	Country	Score	To par
1	Spain	338-358=696	−24
2	Germany	343-357=700	−20
3	France	340-362=702	−18
T4	Finland *	353-355=708	−12
T4	Switzerland *	359-349=708	−12
T4	Ireland *	348-360=708	−12
T4	Scotland	359-349=708	−12
8	Sweden	352-361=713	−7
9	England	353-363=716	−4
10	Iceland	356-362=718	−2
T11	Austria *	346-373=719	−1
T11	Netherlands	359-360=719	−1
13	Denmark	359-361=720	E
14	Italy	360-362=722	+2
15	Norway	362-365=727	+7
T16	Wales *	363-367=730	+10
T16	Portugal	367-363=730	+10
18	Belgium	366-371=737	+17
19	Slovakia	367-372=739	+19
20	Russia	379-402=781	+61

* Note: In the event of a tie the order was determined by the best total of the two non-counting scores of the two rounds.

Individual leaders

Place	Player	Country	Score	To par
1	Scott Fernandez	Spain	66-69=135	−9
T2	Adrián Otaegui	Spain	70-67=137	−7
T2	Thomas Pieters	Belgium	70-67=137	−7
T4	Paul Cutler	Ireland	66-72=138	−6
T4	Guðmundur Kristjánsson	Iceland	71-67=138	−6
T4	Ólafur Loftsson	Iceland	66-72=138	−6
T7	Lucas Bjerregaard	Denmark	67-72=139	−5
T7	James Byrne	Scotland	70-69=139	−5
T7	Marc Dobias	Switzerland	71-68=139	−5
T7	Alexander Lévy	France	66-73=139	−5
T7	Kevin Phelan	Ireland	68-71=139	−5
T7	Tapio Pulkkanen	Finland	71-68=139	−5
T7	Benedict Staben	Germany	69-70=138	−5
T7	Martin Tavoda	Slovakia	71-68=139	−5

Note: There was no official award for the lowest individual score.

Flight A

Bracket

Quarter finals
Germany	4
Scotland	3
France	4.5
Ireland	2.5
Switzerland	5
Finland	2
Sweden	5.5
Spain	1.5

Semi finals
France	4.5
Germany	2.5
Switzerland	4.5
Sweden	2.5

Final
France	4.5
Switzerland	2.5
Bronze match
Sweden	4
Germany	3

Elimination matches
Scotland	3.5
Ireland	1.5
Spain	5
Finland	0

Match for 5th place
Spain	3.5
Scotland	1.5
Match for 7th place
Finland	3
Ireland	2

Final games

France	Switzerland
4.5	2.5
A. Lévy / G. Stal 2 up	M. Dobias / A. Gabella
C. Bouniol / É. España 20th hole	B. Rusch / E. Amacher
Alexander Lévy 5 & 4	Arthur Gabella
Sébastian Gros AS *	Marc Dobias AS *
Julien Brun	Benjamin Rusch 1 up
Gary Stal	Marco Iten 4 & 3
Édouard España 3 & 2	Edouard Amacher

* Note: Game declared halved, since team match already decided.

Flight B

Bracket

Round 1
Norway	4
Iceland	1
Austria	4
Italy	1
Denmark	3.5
Netherlands	1.5
Wales	4
England	1

Round 2
Austria	3
Norway	2
Wales	3.5
Denmark	1.5

Match for 9th place
Wales	3.5
Austria	1.5
Match for 11th place
Denmark	4
Norway	1

Elimination matches
Italy	4
Iceland	1
Netherlands	3
England	2

Match for 13th place
Italy	3.5
Netherlands	1.5
Match for 15th place
England	4
Iceland	1

Flight C

First round

Belgium	Slovakia
3.5	1.5

Portugal	Russia
5	0

Second round

Belgium	Russia
4	1

Portugal	Slovakia
5	0

Third round

Slovakia	Russia
4	1

Portugal	Belgium
4.5	0.5

Final standings

Place	Country
1st place, gold medalist(s)	France
2nd place, silver medalist(s)	Switzerland
3rd place, bronze medalist(s)	Sweden
4	Germany
5	Spain
6	Scotland
7	Finland
8	Ireland
9	Wales
10	Austria
11	Denmark
12	Norway
13	Italy
14	Netherlands
15	England
16	Iceland
17	Portugal
18	Belgium
19	Slovakia
20	Russia

== See also ==
- Eisenhower Trophy – biennial world amateur team golf championship for men organized by the International Golf Federation.
- European Ladies' Team Championship – European amateur team golf championship for women organised by the European Golf Association.
