= 2014 Challenge Tour =

Golf tour season

2014 Challenge Tour season
- Duration: 6 March 2014 – 8 November 2014
- Number of official events: 27 (Note: One further tournament was scheduled but was cancelled.)
- Most wins: (France) Benjamin Hébert (3) (Germany) Moritz Lampert (3)
- Rankings: (England) Andrew Johnston

The 2014 Challenge Tour was the 26th season of the Challenge Tour, the official development tour to the European Tour.

== Schedule ==
The following table lists official events during the 2014 season.

Date	Tournament	Host country	Purse (€)	Winner (Note: The number in brackets after each winner's name is the number of Challenge Tour events they had won up to and including that tournament. This information is only shown for Challenge Tour members. It is rare for someone to accumulate many wins on the Challenge Tour as success at this level usually leads to promotion to the European Tour.)	OWGR points	Other tours (Note: EUR − European Tour.)	Notes
9 Mar	Barclays Kenya Open	Kenya	200,000	(South Africa) Jake Roos (1)	12		
6 Apr	NH Collection Open	Spain	600,000	(Italy) Marco Crespi (3)	18	EUR	New tournament
27 Apr	Challenge de Catalunya	Spain	160,000	(Spain) Antonio Hortal (1)	12		
11 May	Madeira Islands Open - Portugal - BPI	Portugal	600,000	(England) Daniel Brooks (1)	18	EUR	
18 May	Turkish Airlines Challenge	Turkey	175,000	(Wales) Oliver Farr (1)	12		
25 May	Kärnten Golf Open	Austria	160,000	(Germany) Moritz Lampert (1)	12		
1 Jun	D+D Real Czech Challenge	Czech Republic	165,000	(France) Thomas Linard (1)	12		
8 Jun	Fred Olsen Challenge de España	Spain	160,000	(Germany) Moritz Lampert (2)	12		
15 Jun	Najeti Hotels et Golfs Open	France	500,000	(Spain) Jordi García Pinto (2)	12		
22 Jun	Belgian Challenge Open	Belgium	160,000	(England) William Harrold (1)	12		
29 Jun	Scottish Hydro Challenge	Scotland	250,000	(England) Andrew Johnston (1)	12		
6 Jul	Aegean Airlines Challenge Tour	Germany	170,000	(South Africa) Jake Roos (2)	12		
13 Jul	D+D Real Slovakia Challenge	Slovakia	160,000	(Scotland) Andrew McArthur (2)	12		New tournament
20 Jul	Swiss Challenge	Switzerland	160,000	(Belgium) Pierre Relecom (1)	12		
27 Jul	Le Vaudreuil Golf Challenge	France	200,000	(England) Andrew Johnston (2)	12		
3 Aug	Azerbaijan Golf Challenge Open	Azerbaijan	300,000	(Germany) Moritz Lampert (3) (Note: Lampert earned immediate promotion to the European Tour, as this was his third win of the season.)	12		New tournament
10 Aug	Norwegian Challenge	Norway	175,000	(France) Benjamin Hébert (4)	12		
17 Aug	Vacon Open	Finland	170,000	(Chile) Mark Tullo (3)	12		
23 Aug	Rolex Trophy	Switzerland	230,000	(South Korea) An Byeong-hun (1)	12		
31 Aug	Northern Ireland Open Challenge	Northern Ireland	170,000	(Sweden) Joakim Lagergren (1)	12		
7 Sep	Open Blue Green Côtes d'Armor Bretagne	France	200,000	(France) Benjamin Hébert (5)	12		
~~14 Sep~~	Kharkov Superior Cup	Ukraine	–	Cancelled	–		
21 Sep	Kazakhstan Open	Kazakhstan	450,000	(England) Sam Hutsby (1)	13		
5 Oct	EMC Golf Challenge Open	Italy	180,000	(Portugal) Ricardo Gouveia (1)	12		
19 Oct	Shankai Classic	China	US$350,000	(Sweden) Johan Edfors (3)	12		New tournament
26 Oct	Foshan Open	China	US$350,000	(England) Jason Palmer (1)	13		
2 Nov	National Bank of Oman Golf Classic	Oman	US$330,000	(England) Max Orrin (1)	13		
8 Nov	Dubai Festival City Challenge Tour Grand Final	UAE	US$350,000	(France) Benjamin Hébert (6)	17		Flagship event

== Rankings ==
The rankings were based on prize money won during the season, calculated in Euros. The top 15 players on the rankings earned status to play on the 2015 European Tour.

Rank	Player	Prize money (€)
1	(England) Andrew Johnston	190,856
2	(France) Benjamin Hébert	178,266
3	(South Korea) An Byeong-hun	150,107
4	(Germany) Moritz Lampert	137,194
5	(Chile) Mark Tullo	129,968
