= 2014 European Tour Qualifying School graduates =

This is a list of the 27 players who earned their 2015 European Tour card through Q School in 2014.

Place	Player	European Tour starts	Cuts made	Notes
1	(Finland) Mikko Korhonen	68	45	
2	(Argentina) Ricardo González	384	243	4 European Tour wins
3	(Italy) Renato Paratore	5	2	
4	(England) Matt Ford	13	4	
T5	(Spain) Adrián Otaegui	49	16	
T5	(England) John Parry	132	57	1 European Tour win
T5	(Spain) Eduardo de la Riva	97	47	1 Challenge Tour win
8	(England) Richard McEvoy	216	89	1 Challenge Tour win
9	(Sweden) Rikard Karlberg	70	36	2 Asian Tour wins
T10	(Australia) Andrew Dodt	110	47	1 European Tour win
T10	(England) Matt Fitzpatrick	7	4	2013 U.S. Amateur champion
T10	(Norway) Espen Kofstad	40	17	2 Challenge Tour wins
T10	(England) Paul Maddy	3	1	
T10	(England) Tom Murray	2	1	
T10	(England) Chris Lloyd	30	15	
T16	(Sweden) Joakim Lagergren	49	24	1 Challenge Tour win
T16	(India) Anirban Lahiri	31	16	5 Asian Tour wins
T18	(Australia) Jason Scrivener	7	4	
T18	(Spain) Borja Virto	1	0	
T18	(Spain) Pedro Oriol	33	12	
T18	(Sweden) Pelle Edberg	166	78	
T18	(England) Chris Paisley	41	19	1 Challenge Tour win
T18	(Italy) Andrea Pavan	66	26	4 Challenge Tour wins
T18	(Denmark) Lasse Jensen	32	14	
T25	(Italy) Alessandro Tadini	202	104	4 Challenge Tour wins
T25	(United States) Dan Woltman	1	0	
T25	(France) Cyril Bouniol	3	2	

2015 European Tour rookie

== 2015 Results ==
Player	Starts	Cuts made	Best finish	Money list rank	Earnings (€)
(Finland) Mikko Korhonen	21	15	T7	90	310,506
(Argentina) Ricardo González	22	9	T22	160	105,691
(Italy) Renato Paratore*	29	14	T5	109	251,218
(England) Matt Ford*	28	14	2	105	262,333
(Spain) Adrián Otaegui	26	15	T6	118	222,735
(England) John Parry	26	16	T5	92	301,681
(Spain) Eduardo de la Riva	24	15	T2	72	466,400
(England) Richard McEvoy	25	11	T7	127	178,021
(Sweden) Rikard Karlberg*	26	17	Win	56	714,328
(Australia) Andrew Dodt	18	12	Win	75	450,115
(England) Matt Fitzpatrick*	32	21	Win	12	2,094,933
(Norway) Espen Kofstad	4	2	T14	n/a	26,895
(England) Paul Maddy*	26	9	T5	162	98,010
(England) Tom Murray*	21	5	6	184	67,897
(England) Chris Lloyd	23	7	T20	188	63,944
(Sweden) Joakim Lagergren	24	12	T3	83	402,425
(India) Anirban Lahiri*	19	16	Win	20	1,558,111
(Australia) Jason Scrivener*	21	12	T3	117	223,944
(Spain) Borja Virto*	12	3	T37	n/a	17,138
(Spain) Pedro Oriol	19	14	T11	130	170,666
(Sweden) Pelle Edberg	26	9	2	71	471,766
(England) Chris Paisley	21	16	3	108	254,681
(Italy) Andrea Pavan	21	8	T20	187	65,340
(Denmark) Lasse Jensen	21	13	T17	144	138,114
(Italy) Alessandro Tadini	21	11	T5	148	119,293
(United States) Daniel Woltman*	19	5	T22	195	55,604
(France) Cyril Bouniol*	19	6	T36	208	31,234

* European Tour rookie in 2015
T = Tied
The player retained his European Tour card for 2016 (finished inside the top 110).
The player did not retain his European Tour card for 2016, but retained conditional status (finished between 111–149).
The player did not retain his European Tour card for 2016 (finished outside the top 149).

Scrivener, Otaegui, McEvoy, and Jensen regained their cards for 2016 through Q School, while Virto graduated from the Challenge Tour in 2015.

== Winners on the European Tour in 2015 ==
No.	Date	Player	Tournament	Winning score	Margin of victory	Runner(s)-up
1	8 Feb	(India) Anirban Lahiri	Maybank Malaysian Open	−16 (70-72-62-68=272)	1 stroke	(Austria) Bernd Wiesberger
2	15 Feb	(Australia) Andrew Dodt	True Thailand Classic	−16 (71-67-67-67=272)	1 stroke	(Australia) Scott Hend (Thailand) Thongchai Jaidee
3	22 Feb	(India) Anirban Lahiri (2)	Hero Indian Open	−7 (73-65-70-69=277)	Playoff	(India) Shiv Chawrasia
4	20 Sep	(Sweden) Rikard Karlberg	Open d'Italia	−19 (67-67-68-67=269)	Playoff	(Germany) Martin Kaymer
5	11 Oct	(England) Matt Fitzpatrick	British Masters	−15 (64-69-68-68=269)	2 strokes	(Denmark) Søren Kjeldsen (Republic of Ireland) Shane Lowry (Paraguay) Fabrizio Zanotti

== Runners-up on the European Tour in 2015 ==
No.	Date	Player	Tournament	Winner	Winning score	Runner-up score
1	2 Mar	(England) Matt Ford	Africa Open	(South Africa) Trevor Fisher Jnr	−24 (69-68-63-64=264)	−19 (67-66-69-67=269)
2	26 Jul	(England) Matt Fitzpatrick	Omega European Masters	(England) Danny Willett	−17 (65-62-71-65=263)	−16 (69-65-64-66=264)
3	30 Aug	(Sweden) Pelle Edberg	D+D Real Czech Masters	(Belgium) Thomas Pieters	−20 (66-68-65-69=268)	−17 (66-67-67-71=271)
4	13 Sep	(Spain) Eduardo de la Riva	KLM Open	(Belgium) Thomas Pieters	−19 (68-66-62-65=261)	−18 (66-66-67-63=262)

== See also ==
- 2014 Challenge Tour graduates
- 2015 European Tour
