= Wang Jeung-hun =

South Korean golfer

Personal information
- Nationality: South Korea
- Born: 7 September 1995 (age 31) Seoul, South Korea
- Height: 5 ft 10 in (1.78 m)

Career
- Sport: Golf
- Turned professional: 2012
- Current tours: Asian Tour; Korean Tour
- Former tours: European Tour; PGA Tour China
- Professional wins: 5
- Highest ranking: 39 (29 January 2017)

Number of wins by tour
- European Tour: 3
- Asian Tour: 1
- Sunshine Tour: 1
- Other: 2

Best results in major championships
- Masters Tournament: CUT: 2017
- PGA Championship: CUT: 2016, 2017
- U.S. Open: CUT: 2017
- The Open Championship: T60: 2024

Achievements and awards
- Sir Henry Cotton Rookie of the Year: 2016
- Korean Tour Rookie of the Year: 2026

Wang Jeung-hun or Wang Jung-hoon (Korean: 왕정훈; born 7 September 1995) is a South Korean professional golfer. He plays on the European and Asian Tours. He is from Seoul, South Korea.

In 2016, he won the European Tour's Trophée Hassan II on a sponsor exemption. He made a birdie on the second extra hole of a sudden-death playoff to defeat Nacho Elvira. The following week, he won again at the AfrAsia Bank Mauritius Open, a co-sanctioned event on the European, Sunshine and Asian Tours. He claimed a one stroke victory over Siddikur Rahman. His third European Tour win came at the 2017 Commercial Bank Qatar Masters where he beat Joakim Lagergren and Jaco van Zyl in a playoff.

Prior to the European and Asian Tours, he played on PGA Tour China and won the tour's first event in 2014.

== Amateur wins ==
- 2010 Carlubang Amateur Open, YoungIn Univ. President Cup, Sports Chosun Cup
- 2011 DHL-WWW Philippine Amateur, Philippine Amateur

== Professional wins (5) ==
=== European Tour wins (3) ===
No.	Date	Tournament	Winning score	Margin of victory	Runner(s)-up
1	8 May 2016	Trophée Hassan II	−5 (71-68-74-70=283)	Playoff	(Spain) Nacho Elvira
2	15 May 2016	AfrAsia Bank Mauritius Open^{1}	−6 (69-70-71-72=282)	1 stroke	(Bangladesh) Siddikur Rahman
3	29 Jan 2017	Commercial Bank Qatar Masters	−16 (67-72-67-66=272)	Playoff	(Sweden) Joakim Lagergren, (South Africa) Jaco van Zyl

^{1}Co-sanctioned by the Asian Tour and the Sunshine Tour

European Tour playoff record (2–0)

No.	Year	Tournament	Opponent(s)	Result
1	2016	Trophée Hassan II	(Spain) Nacho Elvira	Won with birdie on second extra hole
2	2017	Commercial Bank Qatar Masters	(Sweden) Joakim Lagergren, (South Africa) Jaco van Zyl	Won with birdie on first extra hole

=== Asian Tour wins (1) ===
No.	Date	Tournament	Winning score	Margin of victory	Runner-up
1	15 May 2016	AfrAsia Bank Mauritius Open^{1}	−6 (69-70-71-72=282)	1 stroke	(Bangladesh) Siddikur Rahman

^{1}Co-sanctioned by the European Tour and the Sunshine Tour

Asian Tour playoff record (0–1)

No.	Year	Tournament	Opponent	Result
1	2025	Moutai Singapore Open	(Japan) Yosuke Asaji	Lost to birdie on first extra hole

=== Korean Tour wins (1) ===
No.	Date	Tournament	Winning score	Margin of victory	Runner-up
1	4 Oct 2026	Hyundai Insurance KJ Choi Invitational	−10 (72-69-69-68=278)	3 strokes	(South Korea) Kim Hong-taek

=== PGA Tour China wins (1) ===
No.	Date	Tournament	Winning score	Margin of victory	Runner-up
1	20 Apr 2014	Mission Hills Haikou Open	−23 (67-63-69-66=265)	10 strokes	(China) Zhang Xinjun

== Results in major championships ==
Tournament	2016	2017	2018	2019
Masters Tournament		CUT		
U.S. Open		CUT		
The Open Championship	CUT	CUT		
PGA Championship	CUT	CUT		

Tournament	2020	2021	2022	2023	2024
Masters Tournament					
PGA Championship					
U.S. Open					
The Open Championship	NT				T60

Did not play

CUT = missed the half-way cut
"T" = tied for place
NT = no tournament due to COVID-19 pandemic

== Results in World Golf Championships ==
Tournament	2016	2017
Championship		71
Match Play		T58
Invitational		T66
Champions	T70	

Did not play

QF, R16, R32, R64 = Round in which player lost in match play
"T" = Tied

== Team appearances ==
Professional

- EurAsia Cup (representing Asia): 2016
