= Sébastien Gros =

French professional golfer

Personal information
- Nationality: France
- Born: 8 November 1989 (age 36) Villeurbanne, France
- Height: 1.81 m (5 ft 11 in)
- Weight: 73 kg (161 lb; 11.5 st)

Career
- Sport: Golf
- Turned professional: 2011
- Current tour: Challenge Tour
- Former tours: European Tour; Asian Tour; Alps Tour; MENA Tour
- Professional wins: 6

Number of wins by tour
- Challenge Tour: 2
- Other: 4

Sébastien Gros (born 8 November 1989) is a French professional golfer.

== Career ==
In 1989, Gros was born in Villeurbanne, France.

In 2011, Gros turned professional. Early in his career, Gros played on the Alps Tour. He won on the Alps Tour in 2012 and 2013.

In 2014, Gros began playing on the Challenge Tour and Asian Tour. At the end of 2014, he played all three stages of the European Tour Qualifying School: he finished 32nd, just missing out on a place on the main tour, but earned a place on the Challenge Tour for 2015.

In 2015, Gros won his first Challenge Tour event at the Najeti Open in Saint-Omer, France. He also won the Kazakhstan Open later in the year. He was second in the 2015 Challenge Tour Order of Merit to earn a place on the European Tour for 2016.

Gros played on the European Tour from 2016 to 2018. He lost his card after the 2017 season but regained it through Q School. He lost his card again after the 2018 season and returned to the Challenge Tour for 2019.

In February 2020 he won the Newgiza Open on the MENA Tour.

== Amateur wins ==
- 2008 Biarritz Cup
- 2009 Grand Prix De La Ligue Paca
- 2010 Trophee Thomas de Kristoffy, Grand Prix de Limere, Grand Prix de Savoie
- 2011 Trophee Thomas de Kristoffy

== Professional wins (6) ==
=== Challenge Tour wins (2) ===
No.	Date	Tournament	Winning score	Margin of victory	Runner-up
1	21 Jun 2015	Najeti Open	−14 (68-66-67-69=270)	6 strokes	(France) Thomas Linard
2	13 Sep 2015	Kazakhstan Open	−14 (68-67-70-69=274)	1 stroke	(Denmark) Mads Søgaard

=== Alps Tour wins (2) ===
No.	Date	Tournament	Winning score	Margin of victory	Runner(s)-up
1	24 Jun 2012	Open du Haut Poitou	−8 (70-65-76=211)	1 stroke	(Spain) Carlos García Simarro
2	8 Jun 2013	Open de Saint François Region Guadeloupe	−8 (67-68-70=205)	Playoff	(Republic of Ireland) Stephen Grant, (France) Thomas Linard

=== MENA Tour wins (1) ===
No.	Date	Tournament	Winning score	Margin of victory	Runner-up
1	13 Feb 2020	Newgiza Open	−13 (68-68-67=203)	2 strokes	(England) David Hague

=== French Tour wins (1) ===
No.	Date	Tournament	Winning score	Margin of victory	Runners-up
1	28 Mar 2021	Open d'Arcachon	−11 (69-66-67=202)	3 strokes	(France) Julien Brun, (France) Louis Pilod (a)

== Team appearances ==
Amateur

- European Amateur Team Championship (representing France): 2011 (winners)

== See also ==
- 2015 Challenge Tour graduates
- 2017 European Tour Qualifying School graduates
