= Kazakhstan Open =

Tournament information
- Location: Almaty, Kazakhstan
- Established: 2005
- Course: Zhailjau Golf Club
- Par: 72
- Length: 7,197 yards (6,581 m)
- Tour: Challenge Tour
- Format: Stroke play
- Prize fund: €450,000
- Month played: September
- Final year: 2018

Tournament record score
- Aggregate: 264 Liam Johnston (2018)
- To par: −24 as above

Final champion
- (Scotland) Liam Johnston
- Location in Kazakhstan

The Kazakhstan Open was a men's professional golf tournament on the Challenge Tour, the official developmental tour of the European Tour. First played in 2005, it was held at the Nurtau Golf Club in Almaty, Kazakhstan for the first four editions before moving to the Zhailjau Golf Resort, also in Almaty. Between 2010 and 2018 it had alternated between Nurtau and Zhailjau.

== History ==
Since 2014 the Kazakhstan Open had a prize fund of €450,000, making it one of the richest events on the tour at the time.

In 2012 Scott Henry beat HP Bacher at the second hole of a sudden-death playoff. Henry had holed a 25-foot putt at the final hole to force the playoff and won when Bacher failed to get a par at the second extra hole.

In 2017 Tapio Pulkkanen beat Chase Koepka at the third playoff hole after Koepka took a bogey 5.

== Winners ==
Year	Winner	Score	To par	Margin of victory	Runner(s)-up	Venue
2018	(Scotland) Liam Johnston	264	−24	2 strokes	(England) Tom Murray	Zhailjau
2017	(Finland) Tapio Pulkkanen	271	−17	Playoff	(United States) Chase Koepka	Nurtau
2016	(England) Sam Walker	270	−18	1 stroke	(England) Jordan Smith	Zhailjau
2015	(France) Sébastien Gros	274	−14	1 stroke	(Denmark) Mads Søgaard	Nurtau
2014	(England) Sam Hutsby	269	−19	2 strokes	(England) Andrew Johnston	Zhailjau
2013	(Sweden) Johan Carlsson	270	−18	7 strokes	(England) Tyrrell Hatton (Spain) Adrián Otaegui (Scotland) Duncan Stewart	Nurtau
2012	(Scotland) Scott Henry	269	−19	Playoff	(Austria) HP Bacher	Zhailjau
2011	(England) Tommy Fleetwood	273	−15	2 strokes	(Norway) Knut Børsheim	Nurtau
2010	(Spain) Álvaro Velasco	267	−21	5 strokes	(Italy) Federico Colombo (Scotland) Scott Jamieson (Argentina) Julio Zapata	Zhailjau
2009	(Italy) Edoardo Molinari	268	−20	3 strokes	(England) Chris Gane	Zhailjau
2008	(England) Gary Lockerbie	273	−15	2 strokes	(England) Stuart Davis	Nurtau
2007	(Sweden) Leif Westerberg	279	−9	1 stroke	(England) Ross McGowan	Nurtau
2006	(Wales) Mark Pilkington	272	−16	2 strokes	(England) Shaun P. Webster	Nurtau
2005	(Republic of Ireland) Stephen Browne	273	−15	1 stroke	(England) Lee S. James (Sweden) Steven Jeppesen (Republic of Ireland) Colm Moriarty (Spain) Carl Suneson (England) Tom Whitehouse	Nurtau

== See also ==
- Open golf tournament
