= Adrián Otaegui =

Spanish-Emirati golfer

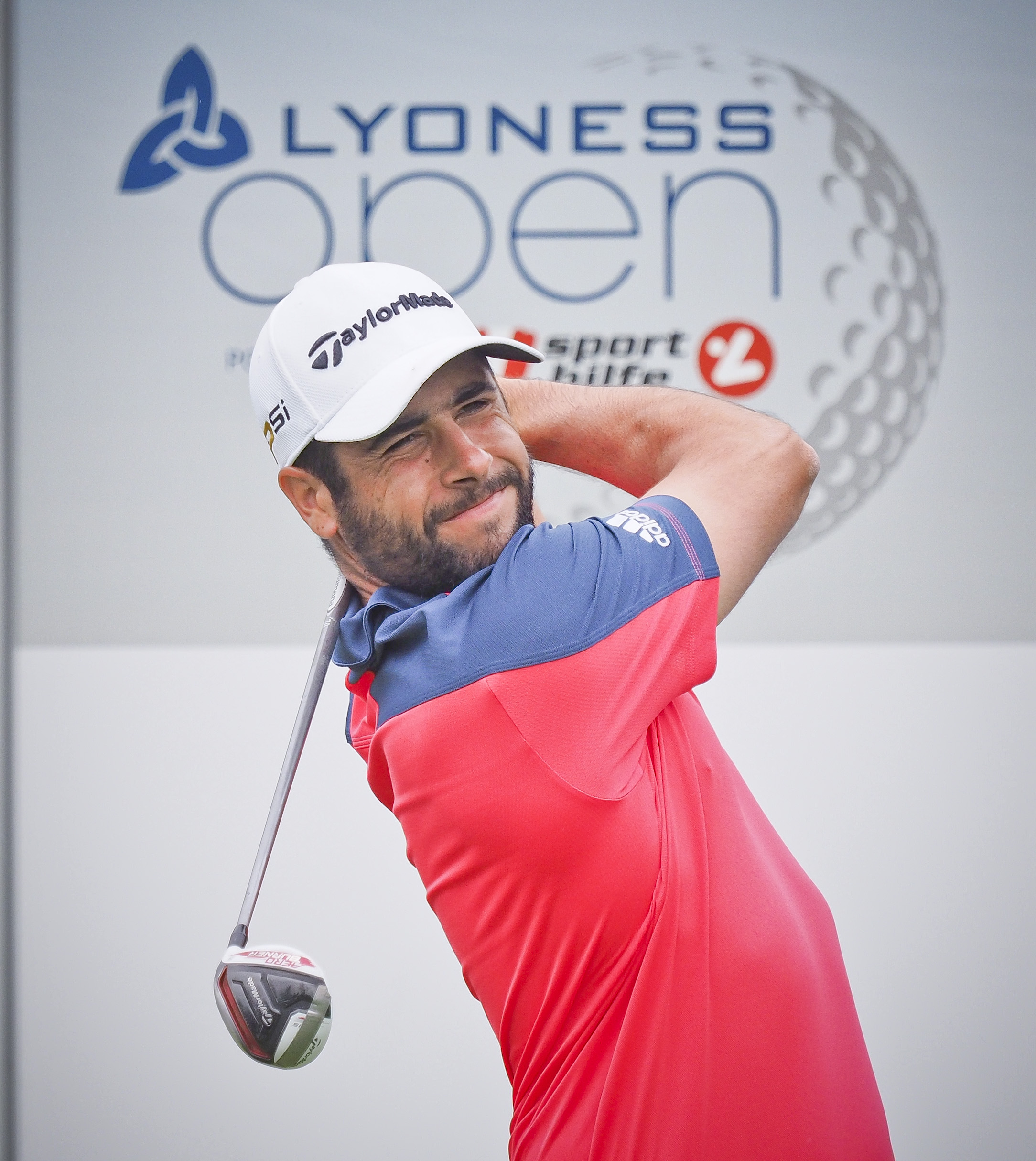
- Otaegui in 2016

Personal information
- Full name: Adrián Otaegui Jaúregui
- Nickname: The Vowel Man
- Nationality: Spain (until Nov 2024); United Arab Emirates (Dec 2024–)
- Born: 21 November 1992 (age 33) San Sebastián, Spain
- Height: 6 ft 0 in (1.83 m)

Career
- Sport: Golf
- Turned professional: 2011
- Current tour: European Tour
- Former tours: Challenge Tour; LIV Golf
- Professional wins: 5
- Highest ranking: 64 (17 February 2019) (as of 25 October 2026)

Number of wins by tour
- European Tour: 5

Best results in major championships
- Masters Tournament: DNP
- PGA Championship: T65: 2018
- U.S. Open: CUT: 2020
- The Open Championship: T55: 2023

Adrián Otaegui Jaúregui (born 21 November 1992) is a Spanish-Emirati professional golfer from San Sebastián who plays on the European Tour where he has won five times. He also played in the inaugural LIV Golf Invitational Series.

== Amateur career ==
Otaegui had a successful amateur career which included winning the 2010 Boys Amateur Championship at Kilmarnock (Barassie) Golf Club where he beat Max Rottluff 4 & 3 in the final.

== Professional career ==
Otaegui turned professional in July 2011. From 2011 to 2013 he played on the Challenge Tour. He had three runner-up finishes in 2013, at the Le Vaudreuil Golf Challenge, the Rolex Trophy and the Kazakhstan Open, finishing seventh on the rankings to earn status to play on the 2014 European Tour. After a poor 2014, Otaegui regained his place on the European tour by finishing tied for 5th in the 2014 Q School. He lost his card again in 2015, but was joint winner of the 2015 Q School to regain his place for 2016. He had more success in 2016, finishing runner-up in the Lyoness Open, one stroke behind Wu Ashun, and tied for third place in the Made in Denmark tournament.

In 2017, Otaegui finished tied for seventh in the Open de France after being tied for the lead after 36 holes. Later in 2017, he tied for 5th in the Porsche European Open and then had his first professional win in the Paul Lawrie Matchplay. In the final against Marcel Siem, he was three down after 9 holes but then won six of the next eight holes to win 2 and 1.

Otaegui was runner-up at the 2018 Volvo China Open, one stroke behind Alexander Björk and entered the world top-100 for the first time. In his next start, he won the Belgian Knockout, beating Benjamin Hébert by 2 shots in the final.

In October 2020, Otaegui won his third title on the European Tour at the Scottish Championship. Having opened the tournament with a ten-under par round of 62, he started the final round four strokes off the lead before closing with a nine-under par 63 to win by four strokes from third round leader Matt Wallace.

In October 2022, Otaegui won the Estrella Damm N.A. Andalucía Masters at Valderrama. He shot a four-round total of 265 (19-under-par), setting a new tournament scoring record. He also beat Joakim Lagergren by six shots.

In June 2023, it was reported that Otaegui had been sanctioned with a four-tournament ban from the European Tour having played in multiple events in the 2022 LIV Golf Invitational Series. He was also reportedly fined £240,000.

In May 2024, Otaegui won the weather-shortened Volvo China Open. The win secured him a place in the 2024 PGA Championship.

== Nationality change ==
In November 2024, it was announced that Otaegui would change his sporting nationality from Spain to UAE. He was eligible to do so having resided in the UAE for 13 years previous.

== Amateur wins ==
- 2010 Boys Amateur Championship

== Professional wins (5) ==
=== European Tour wins (5) ===
No.	Date	Tournament	Winning score	Margin of victory	Runner-up
1	20 Aug 2017	Saltire Energy Paul Lawrie Match Play	2 and 1		(Germany) Marcel Siem
2	20 May 2018	Belgian Knockout	−3	2 strokes	(France) Benjamin Hébert
3	18 Oct 2020	Scottish Championship	−23 (62-70-70-63=265)	4 strokes	(England) Matt Wallace
4	16 Oct 2022	Estrella Damm N.A. Andalucía Masters	−19 (67-66-64-68=265)	6 strokes	(Sweden) Joakim Lagergren
5	5 May 2024	Volvo China Open^{1}	−18 (67-66-65=198) (Note: Shortened to 54 holes due to weather.)	1 stroke	(Italy) Guido Migliozzi

^{1}Co-sanctioned by the China Tour

== Results in major championships ==
Results not in chronological order before 2019 and in 2020.

Tournament	2018	2019	2020	2021	2022	2023	2024
Masters Tournament							
PGA Championship	T65	CUT				CUT	CUT
U.S. Open			CUT				
The Open Championship		CUT	NT			T55	

Did not play

CUT = missed the half-way cut
"T" indicates a tie for a place
NT = No tournament due to COVID-19 pandemic

=== Summary ===
Tournament	Wins	2nd	3rd	Top-5	Top-10	Top-25	Events	Cuts made
Masters Tournament	0	0	0	0	0	0	0	0
PGA Championship	0	0	0	0	0	0	4	1
U.S. Open	0	0	0	0	0	0	1	0
The Open Championship	0	0	0	0	0	0	2	1
Totals	0	0	0	0	0	0	7	2

- Most consecutive cuts made – 1 (twice)
- Longest streak of top-10s – 0

== Results in World Golf Championships ==
Tournament	2018	2019
Championship		T60
Match Play		
Invitational		
Champions	T62	

Did not play

"T" = tied

== Team appearances ==
Amateur

- Junior Ryder Cup (representing Europe): 2008
- European Boys' Team Championship (representing Spain): 2009, 2010
- Jacques Léglise Trophy (representing continental Europe): 2010 (winners)
- Eisenhower Trophy (representing Spain): 2010
- European Amateur Team Championship (representing Spain): 2011

Professional

- World Cup (representing Spain): 2018

== See also ==
- 2011 European Tour Qualifying School graduates
- 2013 Challenge Tour graduates
- 2014 European Tour Qualifying School graduates
- 2015 European Tour Qualifying School graduates
