= 2015 Challenge Tour =

Golf tour season

2015 Challenge Tour season
- Duration: 9 April 2015 – 7 November 2015
- Number of official events: 24
- Most wins: (Spain) Nacho Elvira (3)
- Rankings: (Portugal) Ricardo Gouveia

The 2015 Challenge Tour was the 27th season of the Challenge Tour, the official development tour to the European Tour.

== Schedule ==
The following table lists official events during the 2015 season.

Date	Tournament	Host country	Purse (€)	Winner (Note: The number in brackets after each winner's name is the number of Challenge Tour events they had won up to and including that tournament. This information is only shown for Challenge Tour members. It is rare for someone to accumulate many wins on the Challenge Tour as success at this level usually leads to promotion to the European Tour.)	OWGR points	Other tours (Note: EUR − European Tour.)	Notes
12 Apr	Barclays Kenya Open	Kenya	200,000	(South Africa) Haydn Porteous (1)	12		
25 Apr	Challenge de Madrid	Spain	160,000	(Spain) Nacho Elvira (2)	12		
10 May	Turkish Airlines Challenge	Turkey	175,000	(Wales) Rhys Davies (3)	12		
17 May	Made in Denmark Challenge	Denmark	170,000	(England) Max Orrin (2)	12		New tournament
24 May	Kärnten Golf Open	Austria	180,000	(Spain) Nacho Elvira (3)	12		
31 May	D+D Real Czech Challenge	Czech Republic	170,000	(Sweden) Jens Fahrbring (2)	12		
7 Jun	Swiss Challenge	Switzerland	170,000	(United States) Daniel Im (1)	12		
14 Jun	KPMG Trophy	Belgium	160,000	(Scotland) Jamie McLeary (2)	12		
21 Jun	Najeti Open	France	200,000	(France) Sébastien Gros (1)	12		
28 Jun	SSE Scottish Hydro Challenge	Scotland	250,000	(England) Jack Senior (1)	12		
5 Jul	Aegean Airlines Challenge Tour	Germany	170,000	(Portugal) Ricardo Gouveia (2)	12		
12 Jul	D+D Real Slovakia Challenge	Slovakia	165,000	(Spain) Borja Virto (1)	12		
19 Jul	Fred Olsen Challenge de España	Spain	160,000	(Wales) Rhys Davies (4)	12		
26 Jul	Le Vaudreuil Golf Challenge	France	200,000	(New Zealand) Ryan Fox (1)	12		
2 Aug (Note: Rescheduled due to persistent bad weather.); ~~22 Mar~~	Madeira Islands Open - Portugal - BPI	Portugal	600,000	(Finland) Roope Kakko (3)	18	EUR	
9 Aug	Northern Ireland Open	Northern Ireland	170,000	(France) Clément Sordet (1)	12		
16 Aug	Gant Open	Finland	170,000	(Germany) Dominic Foos (1)	12		
22 Aug	Rolex Trophy	Switzerland	230,000	(Spain) Nacho Elvira (4) (Note: Elvira earned immediate promotion to the European Tour, as this was his third win of the season.)	12		
6 Sep	Cordon Golf Open	France	200,000	(Australia) Scott Arnold (1)	12		
13 Sep	Kazakhstan Open	Kazakhstan	450,000	(France) Sébastien Gros (2)	13		
4 Oct	EMC Challenge Open	Italy	180,000	(Italy) Matteo Delpodio (1)	12		
11 Oct	Volopa Irish Challenge	Ireland	180,000	(England) Tom Murray (1)	12		New tournament
25 Oct	Foshan Open	China	US$500,000	(Spain) Borja Virto (2)	13		
7 Nov	NBO Golf Classic Grand Final	Oman	375,000	(Portugal) Ricardo Gouveia (3)	17		Flagship event

== Rankings ==
The rankings were titled as the Road to Oman and were based on prize money won during the season, calculated in Euros. The top 15 players on the rankings earned status to play on the 2016 European Tour.

Rank	Player	Prize money (€)
1	(Portugal) Ricardo Gouveia	251,592
2	(France) Sébastien Gros	178,645
3	(Spain) Borja Virto	150,466
4	(Spain) Nacho Elvira	114,878
5	(Denmark) Joachim B. Hansen	113,135
