= Thomas Linard =

French professional golfer

Personal information
- Nationality: France
- Born: 24 March 1988 (age 38) Bourges, France
- Height: 1.80 m (5 ft 11 in)
- Weight: 75 kg (165 lb; 11.8 st)

Career
- Sport: Golf
- Turned professional: 2010
- Current tours: Challenge Tour; European Tour
- Professional wins: 1

Number of wins by tour
- Challenge Tour: 1

Thomas Linard (born 24 March 1988) is a French professional golfer.

== Career ==
In 2013 Linard finished 7th in the Alps Tour Order of Merit to earn promotion to the Challenge Tour.

He picked up his first Challenge Tour win in June 2014 at the D+D Real Czech Challenge.

== Professional wins (1) ==
=== Challenge Tour wins (1) ===
No.	Date	Tournament	Winning score	Margin of victory	Runner-up
1	1 Jun 2014	D+D Real Czech Challenge	−19 (70-68-67-64=269)	2 strokes	(Australia) Daniel Gaunt

== See also ==
- 2015 Challenge Tour graduates
