= Ricardo Gouveia (golfer) =

Portuguese professional golfer

Personal information
- Full name: Ricardo Melo Gouveia
- Nationality: Portugal
- Born: 6 August 1991 (age 35) Lisbon, Portugal
- Height: 1.75 m (5 ft 9 in)
- Weight: 84 kg (185 lb; 13.2 st)

Career
- Sport: Golf
- College: Lynn University; University of Central Florida
- Turned professional: 2014
- Current tour: European Tour
- Former tour: Challenge Tour
- Professional wins: 7
- Highest ranking: 77 (31 January 2016)

Number of wins by tour
- Challenge Tour: 7 (Tied-2nd all-time)

Achievements and awards
- Challenge Tour Rankings winner: 2015

Ricardo Melo Gouveia (born 6 August 1991) is a Portuguese professional golfer.

== Career ==
Gouveia played college golf at Lynn University and the University of Central Florida. He played on the winning European team in the Palmer Cup in 2014.

Gouveia turned professional in 2014 and plays on the Challenge Tour. He won his first tournament in his seventh start, playing on an invitation, at the EMC Golf Challenge Open in October 2014.

Gouveia has featured in the Top 100 Official World Golf Ranking, reaching a height of 77th in 2016.

== Professional wins (7) ==
=== Challenge Tour wins (7) ===
Legend
Grand Finals (1)
Other Challenge Tour (6)

No.	Date	Tournament	Winning score	Margin of victory	Runner(s)-up
1	5 Oct 2014	EMC Golf Challenge Open	−9 (68-71-69-67=275)	Playoff	(Germany) Florian Fritsch
2	5 Jul 2015	Aegean Airlines Challenge Tour	−15 (63-79-69-69=269)	4 strokes	(South Africa) Dean Burmester
3	7 Nov 2015	NBO Golf Classic Grand Final	−13 (67-67-76-65=203)	1 stroke	(Denmark) Joachim B. Hansen
4	25 Jul 2021	Italian Challenge (2)	−16 (67-68-69-64=268)	2 strokes	(Austria) Lukas Nemecz
5	14 Aug 2021	Made in Esbjerg Challenge^{1}	−8 (69-71-69-67=276)	3 strokes	(United States) Dodge Kemmer, (Sweden) Jesper Kennegård, (Austria) Niklas Regner
6	30 Apr 2023	Abu Dhabi Challenge	−19 (71-66-66-66=269)	2 strokes	(Spain) Iván Cantero, (England) Joshua Grenville-Wood, (England) Tom Lewis, (South Africa) Wilco Nienaber
7	16 Oct 2023	Hainan Open^{2}	−16 (67-68-70-67=272)	3 strokes	(Switzerland) Joel Girrbach

^{1}Co-sanctioned by the Nordic Golf League
^{2}Co-sanctioned by the China Tour

Challenge Tour playoff record (1–0)

No.	Year	Tournament	Opponent	Result
1	2014	EMC Golf Challenge Open	(Germany) Florian Fritsch	Won with birdie on third extra hole

== Team appearances ==
Amateur

- European Boys' Team Championship (representing Portugal): 2005, 2006, 2007, 2008
- European Amateur Team Championship (representing Portugal): 2007, 2008, 2011, 2013
- Palmer Cup (representing Europe): 2014 (winners)

Professional

- World Cup (representing Portugal): 2016

== See also ==
- 2015 Challenge Tour graduates
- 2021 Challenge Tour graduates
- 2023 Challenge Tour graduates
- List of golfers with most Challenge Tour wins
