= Ryan Evans (golfer) =

English golfer (born 1987)

Personal information
- Nationality: England
- Born: 27 March 1987 (age 39) Kettering, England
- Height: 1.83 m (6 ft 0 in)
- Weight: 89 kg (196 lb; 14.0 st)

Career
- Sport: Golf
- Turned professional: 2014
- Current tour: Clutch Pro Tour
- Former tours: European Tour; Challenge Tour
- Professional wins: 4

Number of wins by tour
- Challenge Tour: 1
- Other: 3

Best results in major championships
- Masters Tournament: DNP
- PGA Championship: DNP
- U.S. Open: CUT: 2018
- The Open Championship: 58th: 2016

Ryan Evans (born 27 March 1987) is an English professional golfer. In 2017 he won the Turkish Airlines Challenge on the Challenge Tour.

== Amateur career ==
Evans won the 2014 Lake Macquarie Amateur, was runner-up for the 2013 St Andrews Links Trophy, and medalist at the 2014 Australian Amateur.

== Professional career ==
Evans was invited to play in some events on the Challenge Tour in 2015. He finished the year at 28th in the rankings, with a best finish of T-3 at the Kärnten Golf Open. He earned his 2016 European Tour card through qualifying school.

Evans qualified for the 2016 Open Championship through Final Qualifying; he finished in 58th place. Later in the season he finished tied for third place in the D+D Real Czech Masters.

Evans returned to the Challenge Tour in 2017 and won the Turkish Airlines Challenge by four strokes from Tapio Pulkkanen. He finished the season 8th in the rankings to earn a place on the European Tour in 2018. He qualified for the 2018 U.S. Open as an alternate, after missing out at the fourth extra hole of a playoff in sectional qualifying at Walton Heath.

== Amateur wins ==
- 2012 South of England Amateur
- 2013 Berkshire Trophy, Biarritz Cup
- 2014 Lake Macquarie Amateur, Avondale Amateur Medal

== Professional wins (4) ==
=== Challenge Tour wins (1) ===
| No. | Date | Tournament | Winning score | Margin of victory | Runner-up |
|---|---|---|---|---|---|
| 1 | 23 Apr 2017 | Turkish Airlines Challenge | −21 (66-66-64-71=267) | 4 strokes | (Finland) Tapio Pulkkanen |

=== Clutch Pro Tour wins (3) ===
| No. | Date | Tournament | Winning score | Margin of victory | Runner(s)-up |
|---|---|---|---|---|---|
| 1 | 12 Oct 2023 | Tour Championship | −12 (69-67-71=207) | Playoff | (England) Ben Evans, (England) Curtis Griffiths |
| 2 | 13 Jun 2024 | Manor House | −17 (66-65-68=199) | Playoff | (England) Callan Barrow |
| 3 | 16 Aug 2024 | Mannings Heath | −16 (68-65-67=200) | 2 strokes | (England) Callum Farr, (England) John Gough, (England) Gary King, (England) David Langley, (England) Joe Retford, (England) Daniel Smith, (England) Thomas Thurloway |

== Results in major championships ==
| Tournament | 2016 | 2017 | 2018 |
|---|---|---|---|
| Masters Tournament | | | |
| U.S. Open | | | CUT |
| The Open Championship | 58 | | |
| PGA Championship | | | |

Did not play

CUT = missed the half-way cut
"T" = tied

== Team appearances ==
Amateur

- European Amateur Team Championship (representing England): 2014
- Eisenhower Trophy (representing England): 2014
- St Andrews Trophy (representing Great Britain and Ireland): 2014 (winners)
- Bonallack Trophy (representing Europe): 2014 (winners)

== See also ==
- 2015 European Tour Qualifying School graduates
- 2017 Challenge Tour graduates
