= Northern Ireland Open (golf) =

Black Desert NI Open
Tournament information
- Location: Ballymena, Northern Ireland
- Established: 2010
- Course: Galgorm Castle Golf Club
- Par: 70
- Length: 7,105 yards (6,497 m)
- Tours: Challenge Tour; PGA EuroPro Tour; Clutch Pro Tour
- Format: Stroke play
- Prize fund: £250,000
- Month played: July

Tournament record score
- Aggregate: 265 Ryan Fox (2016); 265 Calum Hill (2018)
- To par: −19 as above

Current champion
- (Republic of Ireland) Conor Purcell

Final champion
- Location in Northern Ireland

The Northern Ireland Open is a professional golf tournament currently played on the Challenge Tour. It was played for the first time in June 2010 on the PGA EuroPro Tour at Galgorm Castle Golf Club in Ballymena, Northern Ireland. It also featured on the Clutch Pro Tour schedule from 2021 to 2023.

== History ==
The tournament was founded in 2010 and featured on the PGA EuroPro Tour schedule. James Hepworth won the inaugural event.

In 2013, the event became part of the Challenge Tour schedule.

In 2017, the event was changed from 72 holes of stroke play to a "Super 6" style format. The format was similar to that used for the World Super 6 Perth. The main difference was that the 6-hole matches were determined by stroke play rather than match play. It retained the 156-player field, with the cut being made at the top-60 and ties after 36 holes. After 54 holes, the field was cut to a fixed 24. Ties for 24th place were determined by a sudden-death playoff. There were then five six-hole knock-out rounds on the final day. The leading eight after 54 holes received a bye in the first round. The remaining 16 were randomly paired. The six holes used on the final day were 17, 5, 6, 7, 8 and 18. There were a number of other matches for the minor places.

In 2018, the event reverted back to a 72-hole stroke-play tournament.

In 2019, Galgorm Castle hosted the ISPS Handa World Invitational, a mixed event with separate tournaments for men and women, in place of the Northern Ireland Open.

In 2020, the event returned to the Challenge Tour as the Northern Ireland Open with backing from The R&A. The tournament was played on the Clutch Pro Tour between 2021 and 2023, with the event returning to the Challenge Tour schedule in 2024. It was later confirmed in June 2024 that the Black Desert Resort in Utah (host of the Black Desert Championship on the PGA Tour) would become the title sponsor of the event.

== Winners ==
Year	Tour(s) (Note: CHA − Challenge Tour; CPT − Clutch Pro Tour; EPT − PGA EuroPro Tour.)	Winner	Score	To par	Margin of victory	Runner(s)-up
Black Desert NI Open
2024	CHA	(Republic of Ireland) Conor Purcell	267	−13	1 stroke	(Sweden) Joakim Lagergren
Northern Ireland Open
2023	CPT	(England) Brandon Robinson-Thompson	201	−9	3 strokes	(England) Daniel Smith
2022	CPT	(Northern Ireland) Dermot McElroy	205	−8	7 strokes	(Republic of Ireland) Tim Rice
2021	CPT	(Republic of Ireland) John Murphy	135	−5	4 strokes	(Northern Ireland) Dermot McElroy
2020	CHA	(United States) Tyler Koivisto	267	−13	2 strokes	(Norway) Kristian Krogh Johannessen
2019: No tournament
Galgorm Resort & Spa Northern Ireland Open
2018	CHA	(Scotland) Calum Hill	265	−19	1 stroke	(Scotland) Scott Henry (Wales) Stuart Manley
2017	CHA	(France) Robin Sciot-Siegrist	20 (Note: The 2017 event used a knockout format. This is the score in the final.)	−3	2 strokes	(Italy) Alessandro Tadini
Tayto Northern Ireland Open
2016	CHA	(New Zealand) Ryan Fox	265	−19	4 strokes	(Germany) Dominic Foos (South Africa) Dylan Frittelli (England) Max Orrin (Germany) Bernd Ritthammer
Northern Ireland Open
2015	CHA	(France) Clément Sordet	267	−17	1 stroke	(United States) John Hahn
Northern Ireland Open Challenge
2014	CHA	(Sweden) Joakim Lagergren	271	−13	1 stroke	(France) Adrien Bernadet
2013	CHA	(Netherlands) Daan Huizing	271	−13	Playoff	(England) Oliver Wilson
Ulster Bank Open
2012	EPT	(England) Paul Reed	204	−12	1 stroke	(Scotland) Elliot Saltman (England) George Woolgar
Galgorm Castle Northern Ireland Open
2011	EPT	(England) Chris Hanson	202	−14	Playoff	(England) Graeme Clarke
2010	EPT	(England) James Hepworth	201	−15	Playoff	(Australia) Daniel Gaunt

== See also ==
- Open golf tournament
- ISPS Handa World Invitational
