= Max Orrin =

English golfer (born 1994)

Personal information
- Nationality: England
- Born: 13 May 1994 (age 32) Margate, Kent, England
- Height: 6 ft 1 in (1.85 m)

Career
- Sport: Golf
- Turned professional: 2013
- Current tour: Challenge Tour
- Former tours: European Tour; Clutch Pro Tour
- Professional wins: 6

Number of wins by tour
- Challenge Tour: 2
- Other: 4

Max Orrin (born 13 May 1994) is an English professional golfer.

== Career ==
Orrin was born in Margate, Kent. He played on the 2013 Walker Cup team, then turned professional in 2013.

Orrin played on the Challenge Tour in 2014 and won the penultimate tournament of the season, the National Bank of Oman Golf Classic.

== Professional wins (6) ==
=== Challenge Tour wins (2) ===
No.	Date	Tournament	Winning score	Margin of victory	Runner(s)-up
1	2 Nov 2014	National Bank of Oman Golf Classic	−7 (71-71-68-71=281)	2 strokes	(England) Jason Palmer
2	23 Aug 2015	Made in Denmark Challenge	−13 (63-67-68-73=271)	2 strokes	(Sweden) Kristoffer Broberg, (Australia) Daniel Gaunt, (Denmark) Søren Kjeldsen, (Australia) Terry Pilkadaris

=== Pro Golf Tour wins (1) ===
No.	Date	Tournament	Winning score	Margin of victory	Runner-up
1	25 Mar 2014	Red Sea Ain Sokhna Classic	−17 (65-68-66=199)	6 strokes	(France) Antoine Schwartz

=== Clutch Pro Tour wins (1) ===
No.	Date	Tournament	Winning score	Margin of victory	Runners-up
1	8 Jun 2022	Frilford Heath Classic	−8 (64-72=136)	2 strokes	(England) Jamie Dick, (England) Ross Hampshire, (England) Nick McCarthy

=== French Tour wins (2) ===
No.	Date	Tournament	Winning score	Margin of victory	Runner-up
1	6 Dec 2014	AfrAsia Golf Masters	−6 (71-70-69=210)	2 strokes	(South Africa) Hennie Otto
2	5 Dec 2015	Mauritius Golf Masters (2)	−9 (67-69-71=207)	Playoff	(France) François Calmels

== Team appearances ==
- European Boys' Team Championship (representing England): 2011, 2012
- Jacques Léglise Trophy (representing Great Britain & Ireland): 2012
- European Amateur Team Championship (representing England): 2013 (winners)
- Walker Cup (representing Great Britain & Ireland): 2013

== See also ==
- 2016 European Tour Qualifying School graduates
