= 2003 Tour de las Américas =

Golf tour season

2003 Tour de las Américas season
- Duration: 8 January 2003 – 14 December 2003
- Number of official events: 12
- Most wins: (Argentina) Andrés Romero (2)
- Order of Merit: (Argentina) Eduardo Argiró

The 2003 Tour de las Américas, titled as the 2003 American Express Tour de las Américas for sponsorship reasons, was the 12th season of the Tour de las Américas (formerly the South American Tour), the main professional golf tour in Latin America since it was formed in 1991.

== American Express title sponsorship ==
In May, it was announced that the tour had signed a title sponsorship agreement with American Express, being renamed as the American Express Tour de las Américas.

== Schedule ==
The following table lists official events during the 2003 season.

Date	Tournament	Host country	Purse (US$)	Winner (Note: The number in brackets after each winner's name is the number of Tour de las Américas events they had won up to and including that tournament.)	OWGR points	Other tours (Note: CHA − Challenge Tour.)
11 Jan	Caribbean Open	Bahamas	50,000	(Argentina) Rafael Gómez (1)	n/a	
18 Jan	Samsung Panama Open	Panama	200,000	(United States) Charles Warren (1)	n/a	
26 Jan	Cable and Wireless Panama Masters	Panama	40,000	(Argentina) Andrés Romero (1)	n/a	
2 Feb	Credomatic MasterCard Costa Rica Open	Costa Rica	100,000	(Argentina) Sebastián Fernández (2)	6	CHA
9 Feb	Telefónica Centro America Abierto de Guatemala	Guatemala	100,000	(Argentina) Daniel Vancsik (1)	6	CHA
16 Feb	American Express Los Encinos Open	Mexico	100,000	(England) James Hepworth (n/a)	6	CHA
25 May	Acapulco Fest Invitational	Mexico	50,000	(Mexico) José Octavio González (1)	n/a	
16 Nov	Bancolombia American Express Serrezuela Masters	Colombia	50,000	(Colombia) Ángel Romero (2)	n/a	
23 Nov	Abierto de Medellín	Colombia	50,000	(Argentina) Andrés Romero (2)	n/a	
30 Nov	American Express Trump Brazil Open	Brazil	100,000	(Paraguay) Carlos Franco (5)	n/a	
14 Dec	Mexican Open	Mexico	300,000	(Colombia) Eduardo Herrera (1)	n/a	

=== Unofficial events ===
The following events were sanctioned by the Tour de las Américas, but did not carry official money, nor were wins official.

Date	Tournament	Host country	Purse ($)	Winner
11 Oct	Copa de Naciones	Mexico	n/a	(Chile) Felipe Aguilar and (Chile) Roy Mackenzie

== Order of Merit ==
The Order of Merit was based on prize money won during the season, calculated in U.S. dollars.

Position	Player	Prize money ($)
1	(Argentina) Eduardo Argiró	48,174
2	(Argentina) Juan Abbate	36,221
3	(Argentina) Sebastián Fernández	27,456
4	(Argentina) Daniel Vancsik	26,146
5	(Argentina) Rafael Gómez	24,800
