= National Bank of Oman Golf Classic =

Golf Tournament

Tournament information
- Location: Muscat, Oman
- Established: 2013
- Course: Al Mouj Golf
- Par: 72
- Length: 7,310 yards (6,680 m)
- Tour: Challenge Tour
- Format: Stroke play
- Prize fund: US$330,000
- Month played: October/November
- Final year: 2014

Tournament record score
- Aggregate: 274 Roope Kakko (2013)
- To par: −14 as above

Final champion
- (England) Max Orrin
- Location in Oman

The National Bank of Oman Golf Classic was a golf tournament on the Challenge Tour. It was played for the first time in October 2013 at Al Mouj Golf, The Wave in Muscat, Oman. In 2015, the tournament was superseded by the Challenge Tour Grand Final when that tournament relocated to Al Mouj.

== Winners ==
| Year | Winner | Score | To par | Margin of victory | Runner-up |
|---|---|---|---|---|---|
| 2014 | (England) Max Orrin | 281 | −7 | 2 strokes | (England) Jason Palmer |
| 2013 | (Finland) Roope Kakko | 274 | −14 | 2 strokes | (Denmark) Lucas Bjerregaard |

== See also ==
- Oman Open
