= 2023 Clutch Pro Tour =

Golf tour season

2023 Clutch Pro Tour season
- Duration: 2 May 2023 – 12 October 2023
- Number of official events: 18
- Most wins: (England) Brandon Robinson-Thompson (3)
- Order of Merit: (England) George Bloor

The 2023 Clutch Pro Tour, titled as the 2023 Mizuno Next Gen Series for sponsorships reasons, was the fourth season of the Clutch Pro Tour, a third-tier tour recognised by the European Tour.

== Challenge Tour feeder status ==
In December 2022, it was announced that the Clutch Pro Tour and the Tartan Pro Tour would become official feeder tours to the Challenge Tour in place of the now-defunct PGA EuroPro Tour. The Clutch Pro Tour would offer Challenge Tour status to the top two players on the Order of Merit.

== Schedule ==
The following table lists official events during the 2023 season.

Date	Tournament	Location	Purse (£)	Winner (Note: The number in brackets after each winner's name is the number of Clutch Pro Tour events they had won up to and including that tournament. It is rare for someone to accumulate many wins on the Clutch Pro Tour as success at this level usually leads to promotion to the Challenge Tour.)
4 May	St Mellion	Cornwall	60,000	(England) Jake Burnage (1)
10 May	Frilford Heath Red	Oxfordshire	60,000	(England) Will Enefer (2)
17 May	The Players Club	Bristol	60,000	(England) Tom Shadbolt (1)
26 May	Farnham	Surrey	60,000	(England) Nick Marsh (1)
1 Jun	Galvin Green Championship	Surrey	60,000	(England) Brandon Robinson-Thompson (1)
8 Jun	Motocaddy Masters	Wiltshire	60,000	(England) Tom Shadbolt (2)
16 Jun	Northern Ireland Masters	Northern Ireland	60,000	(England) Sam Broadhurst (2)
22 Jun	Northern Ireland Open	Northern Ireland	100,000	(England) Brandon Robinson-Thompson (2)
30 Jun	Machynys	Wales	60,000	(England) Brandon Robinson-Thompson (3)
14 Jul	Harleyford	Buckinghamshire	60,000	(England) Taylor Paul (1)
18 Jul	Modest! Golf Championship	Hampshire	60,000	(Australia) Zach Murray (1)
27 Jul	The Astbury	Shropshire	60,000	(England) Niall Powell (1)
11 Aug	Slaley Hall	Northumberland	100,000	(England) Jack South (1)
25 Aug	Frilford Heath Blue	Oxfordshire	60,000	(United States) Hunter Howell (1)
30 Aug	Golf at Goodwood	West Sussex	60,000	(England) Piers Berrington (1)
7 Sep	Heythrop Park Masters	Oxfordshire	60,000	(England) Giles Evans (5)
26 Sep	Stoneham	Hampshire	60,000	(England) Curtis Knipes (3)
12 Oct	Tour Championship	Norfolk	100,000	(England) Ryan Evans (1)

=== Unofficial events ===
The following events were sanctioned by the Clutch Pro Tour, but did not carry official money, nor were wins official.

Date	Tournament	Location	Purse (£)	Winner
18 Oct	Abu Dhabi Masters Pro-Am	UAE	10,000	(England) Luke Joy

== Order of Merit ==
The Order of Merit was titled as the Race to Royal Norwich and was based on tournament results during the season, calculated using a points-based system. The top two players on the Order of Merit earned status to play on the 2024 Challenge Tour.

Position	Player	Points	Status earned
1	(England) George Bloor	4,129	Promoted to Challenge Tour
2	(England) Curtis Knipes	4,031	Promoted to Challenge Tour
3	(England) Tom Shadbolt	3,642	Qualified for Challenge Tour (made cut in Q School)
4	(England) Thomas Thurloway	3,447	
5	(England) Brandon Robinson-Thompson	3,386	Finished in Top 70 of Challenge Tour Rankings
6	(England) Piers Berrington	3,375	
7	(England) Jake Burnage	3,273	
8	(England) Olly Huggins	3,191	
9	(England) Habebul Islam	2,926	
10	(England) Joe Brooks	2,863	

== Tier 2 ==
2023 Clutch Pro Tour Tier 2 season
- Duration: 2 May 2023 – 27 September 2023
- Number of official events: 13
- Most wins: (England) Luke Harries (2)
- Order of Merit: (England) Conor White

The 2023 Clutch Pro Tour Tier 2 was the inaugural season of the Clutch Pro Tour Tier 2, the official development tour to the Clutch Pro Tour.

=== Schedule ===
The following table lists official events during the 2023 season.

Date	Tournament	Location	Purse (£)	Winner (Note: The number in brackets after each winner's name is the number of Clutch Pro Tour Tier 2 events they had won up to and including that tournament. It is rare for someone to accumulate many wins on the Clutch Pro Tour Tier 2 as success at this level usually leads to promotion to the Clutch Pro Tour.)
3 May	Luton Hoo	Bedfordshire	30,000	(England) Ben Robinson (1)
12 May	Royal Ascot	Berkshire	30,000	(England) Jack Malone (1)
17 May	Heythrop Park	Oxfordshire	30,000	(England) Liam Robinson (1)
25 May	Sonning	Surrey	30,000	(Wales) Luke Harries (1)
31 May	South Staffs	Staffordshire	30,000	(England) Jack Slater (1)
8 Jun	Drayton Park	Oxfordshire	30,000	(England) Luke Harries (2)
7 Jul	Bowood	Wiltshire	30,000	(South Africa) Rupert Kaminski (1)
11 Jul	Millbrook	Bedfordshire	30,000	(England) Conor White (1)
18 Aug	Mannings Heath	West Sussex	30,000	(England) Daniel Smith (1)
24 Aug	Minchinhampton	Gloucestershire	30,000	(England) Joe Long (1)
15 Sep	Redditch	Worcestershire	30,000	(England) James Bailey (1)
19 Sep	Old Fold Manor	Greater London	30,000	(England) Gary King (1)
27 Sep	Tour Championship	Oxfordshire	30,000	(England) Joseph Quinn (1)

=== Order of Merit ===
The Order of Merit was based on tournament results during the season, calculated using a points-based system. The top 15 players on the Order of Merit earned status to play on the 2024 Clutch Pro Tour.

Position	Player	Points
1	(England) Conor White	3,567
2	(England) Luke Harries	3,426
3	(England) Gary King	3,208
4	(England) Reece Samson	2,738
5	(England) Sam Hessian	2,169
