= 2022 Clutch Pro Tour =

Golf tour season

2022 Clutch Pro Tour season
- Duration: 4 April 2022 – 20 October 2022
- Number of official events: 22
- Most wins: (England) Giles Evans (2) (England) Paul Maddy (2)
- Order of Merit: (England) Giles Evans

The 2022 Clutch Pro Tour, titled as the 2022 Mizuno Next Gen Series for sponsorships reasons, was the third season of the Clutch Pro Tour, a third-tier tour recognised by the European Tour.

== Mizuno title sponsorship ==
In May, it was announced the tour had signed a title sponsorship agreement with Mizuno, being renamed as the Mizuno Next Gen Series.

== Schedule ==
The following table lists official events during the 2022 season.

Date	Tournament	Location	Purse (£)	Winner (Note: The number in brackets after each winner's name is the number of Clutch Pro Tour events they had won up to and including that tournament. It is rare for someone to accumulate many wins on the Clutch Pro Tour as success at this level usually leads to promotion to the Challenge Tour.)
5 Apr	Midlands Masters	Warwickshire	15,000	(England) Oliver Farrell (3)
12 Apr	Remedy Oak Classic	Dorset	8,000	(England) Louis Boston (1)
28 Apr	Trentham Classic	Staffordshire	15,000	(England) Paul Maddy (1)
5 May	Galvin Green Championship	Cornwall	19,500	(England) Paul Maddy (2)
10 May	Chart Hills Open	Kent	30,000	(England) Sam Broadhurst (1)
19 May	Old Fold Manor Open	Greater London	15,000	(England) Taylor Carter (1)
24 May	Links Challenge	Kent	30,000	(Canada) Craig Stefureak (1)
2 Jun	Drayton Park Classic	Staffordshire	15,000	(Australia) Austin Bautista (1)
8 Jun	Frilford Heath Classic	Oxfordshire	15,000	(England) Max Orrin (1)
14 Jun	MCB Masters	Norfolk	30,000	(England) Jensen Hull (1)
6 Jul	Northern Ireland Open	Northern Ireland	15,000	(Northern Ireland) Dermot McElroy (1)
12 Jul	GolfStar Masters	Oxfordshire	30,000	(England) Rob Harrhy (1)
19 Jul	Modest! Golf Championship	Hampshire	12,500	(England) Habebul Islam (1)
29 Jul	#MizNextGen Open	Rutland	30,000	(England) Max Smith (1)
3 Aug	Hollinwell Classic	Nottinghamshire	8,000	(England) Liam Murray (1)
9 Aug	The Astbury Classic	Shropshire	15,000	(England) Harry Beavan (1)
18 Aug	The Oxfordshire Classic	Oxfordshire	15,000	(England) Giles Evans (3)
23 Aug	South of England Open	Hertfordshire	30,000	(England) Thomas Plumb (1)
13 Sep	Golf at Goodwood (Downs)	West Sussex	15,000	(England) Giles Evans (4)
27 Sep	Stoneham Classic	Hampshire	8,000	(England) Sam Hutsby (1)
29 Sep	Northamptonshire County Classic	Northamptonshire	8,000	(England) Gary Boyd (1)
20 Oct	Tour Championship	Derbyshire	30,000	(England) Owen Benson (1)

=== Unofficial events ===
The following events were sanctioned by the Clutch Pro Tour, but did not carry official money, nor were wins official.

Date	Tournament	Location	Purse (£)	Winner
14 Feb	Gloria Pro-Am	Turkey	10,000	(England) Sam Broadhurst
17 Feb	Gloria Super Series 1	Turkey	10,000	(England) Ben Jones
20 Feb	Gloria Super Series 2	Turkey	10,000	(England) Brad Bawden
23 Feb	Gloria Super Series 2	Turkey	10,000	(England) Jack Yule
9 Nov	GolfStar Masters Abu Dhabi Pro-Am	UAE	10,000	(England) Luke Joy
1 Dec	Mizuno Next Gen Pro-Am	Turkey	10,000	(England) Robbie Busher (Scotland) Craig Lee

== Order of Merit ==
The Order of Merit was based on tournament results during the season, calculated using a points-based system.

Position	Player	Points
1	(England) Giles Evans	4,098
2	(England) Owen Benson	3,609
3	(England) Daniel Smith	3,216
4	(Canada) Craig Stefureak	3,037
5	(England) Adam Batty	2,890
