= Northern Ireland Masters =

Tournament information
- Location: Newtownards, Northern Ireland
- Established: 2003
- Course: Clandeboye Golf Club
- Par: 71
- Length: 6,742 yards (6,165 m)
- Tours: Challenge Tour; PGA EuroPro Tour; Clutch Pro Tour
- Format: Stroke play
- Prize fund: £60,000
- Month played: June
- Final year: 2023

Tournament record score
- Aggregate: 273 Darren Clarke (2003)
- To par: −11 as above

Final champion
- (England) Sam Broadhurst
- Location in Northern Ireland

The Northern Ireland Masters was a professional golf tournament that was played at Clandeboye Golf Club in Newtownards, Northern Ireland.

== History ==
It was originally played as a one-off event on the Challenge Tour in September 2003. Darren Clarke won the inaugural event by two shots ahead of Stuart Little.

The event returned in 2021 as part of the PGA EuroPro Tour's schedule. It was hosted by then recent first-time European Tour winner Jonathan Caldwell. The tournament was played again in 2022 on the PGA EuroPro Tour.

In 2023, the tournament moved onto the Clutch Pro Tour, as the PGA EuroPro Tour had ceased operation at the end of 2022.

== Winners ==
Year	Tour (Note: CHA − Challenge Tour; CPT − Clutch Pro Tour; EPT − PGA EuroPro Tour.)	Winner	Score	To par	Margin of victory	Runner(s)-up
Northern Ireland Masters
2023	CPT	(England) Sam Broadhurst (2)	201	−12	4 strokes	(England) Piers Berrington (England) Habebul Islam
2022	EPT	(England) Sam Broadhurst	204	−9	1 stroke	(England) Paul Maddy
NI Masters
2021	EPT	(Republic of Ireland) Simon Thornton	199	−14	2 strokes	(England) David Langley
2004–2020: No tournament
Benmore Developments Northern Ireland Masters
2003	CHA	(Northern Ireland) Darren Clarke	273	−11	2 strokes	(England) Stuart Little
