= Panama Masters =

Summit Panama Masters
Tournament information
- Location: Panama City, Panama
- Established: 2002
- Courses: Summit Golf & Resort
- Par: 71
- Length: 6,822 yards (6,238 m)
- Tours: Tour de las Américas; Challenge Tour
- Format: Stroke play
- Prize fund: US$125,000
- Month played: February
- Final year: 2005

Tournament record score
- Aggregate: 272 Pedro Martínez (2002)
- To par: −14 Andrés Romero (2003) −14 Miguel Fernández (2004) −14 Mark Pilkington (2004)

Final champion
- (United States) Kevin Haefner
- Location in Panama

The Panama Masters was a golf tournament on the Tour de las Américas from 2002 to 2005. It was hosted at Summit Golf & Resort in Panama City, Panama. In 2004 and 2005 it was co-sanctioned by the Challenge Tour.

== Winners ==
Year	Tours (Note: CHA − Challenge Tour; TLA − Tour de las Américas.)	Winner	Score	To par	Margin of victory	Runner-up
Summit Panama Masters
2005	CHA, TLA	(United States) Kevin Haefner	276	−8	2 strokes	(England) James Hepworth
2004	CHA, TLA	(Argentina) Miguel Fernández	274	−14	Playoff	(Wales) Mark Pilkington
Cable and Wireless Panama Masters
2003	TLA	(Argentina) Andrés Romero	274	−14	4 strokes	(Argentina) Juan Abbate
LG Panama Masters
2002	TLA	(Paraguay) Pedro Martínez	272	−12	1 stroke	(United States) Chris Patton
