= Gary King (golfer) =

English golfer

Personal information
- Full name: Gary George King
- Nationality: England
- Born: 17 June 1990 (age 36) Sutton, London, England
- Height: 5 ft 9 in (1.75 m)
- Weight: 10.8 st (151 lb; 69 kg)

Career
- Sport: Golf
- Turned professional: 2009
- Current tour: Clutch Pro Tour
- Former tours: European Tour; Challenge Tour; PGA EuroPro Tour; MENA Golf Tour
- Professional wins: 10

Number of wins by tour
- Challenge Tour: 1
- Other: 9

Gary George King (born 17 June 1990) is an English professional golfer.

King has played on the PGA EuroPro Tour since 2009, winning twice in 2015. He also played on the MENA Golf Tour in 2015, winning once.

King earned a 2016 Challenge Tour card through qualifying school. He won the fifth event of the season in May, the Montecchia Open.

King finished 24th in the 2016 Road to Oman, the Challenge Tour Order of Merit, and was back at qualifying school in November 2016 to try and move up to the main tour. He shot a final round 66 (−6) to get playing rights on the European Tour for 2017.

== Amateur wins ==
- 2008 Skandia Junior Open

== Professional wins (10) ==
=== Challenge Tour wins (1) ===
No.	Date	Tournament	Winning score	Margin of victory	Runners-up
1	15 May 2016	Montecchia Open	−17 (64-63-69=196) (Note: Shortened to 36/54 holes due to weather.)	1 stroke	(Germany) Moritz Lampert, (France) Matthieu Pavon

=== Clutch Pro Tour wins (1) ===
No.	Date	Tournament	Winning score	Margin of victory	Runners-up
1	8 May 2024	Brocket Hall Masters	−9 (71-66=137)	3 strokes	(England) Jake Ayres, (England) Thomas Beasley, (England) Joe Brooks, (England) Jake Burnage, (England) Bailey Gill, (England) Olly Huggins, (South Korea) Kim Dong-won, (England) Jake McGoldrick, (England) Conor White

=== PGA EuroPro Tour wins (2) ===
No.	Date	Tournament	Winning score	Margin of victory	Runner(s)-up
1	15 May 2015	World Snooker Open	−9 (64-68-66=198)	1 stroke	(Northern Ireland) Alan Dunbar, (England) Billy Hemstock
2	22 May 2015	Buildbase Open	−10 (62-70-74=206)	2 strokes	(Wales) James Frazer

=== MENA Golf Tour wins (1) ===
No.	Date	Tournament	Winning score	Margin of victory	Runner-up
1	23 Sep 2015	Ascorp Golf Citizen Abu Dhabi Open	−9 (67-68-72=207)	Playoff	(England) James Allan

=== Clutch Pro Tour Tier 2 wins (3) ===
No.	Date	Tournament	Winning score	Margin of victory	Runner(s)-up
1	19 Sep 2023	Old Fold Manor	−6 (65)	2 strokes	(England) Kale Heath
2	11 Jul 2024	Effingham	−5 (66)	1 stroke	(England) Harvey Byers, (England) Reece Samson
3	20 May 2026	Ogbourne Downs	−9 (66-67=133)	4 strokes	(England) Liam Murray

=== Jamega Pro Golf Tour wins (2) ===
No.	Date	Tournament	Winning score	Margin of victory	Runner(s)-up
1	9 May 2011	The Shire	−6 (65-69=134)	2 strokes	(England) Tommy Haylock
2	20 Jun 2014	The Leatherhead	−4 (67)	4 strokes	(England) Magnus Eilertsen, (England) Mark Raven

== Team appearances ==
Amateur

- Jacques Léglise Trophy (representing Great Britain & Ireland): 2008 (winners)

== See also ==
- 2016 European Tour Qualifying School graduates
