= Joe Long (golfer) =

English professional golfer

Personal information
- Full name: Joseph Matthew Long
- Nationality: England
- Born: 21 May 1997 (age 29) Bristol, England
- Height: 6 ft 0 in (183 cm)

Career
- Sport: Golf
- Turned professional: 2021
- Current tours: Sunshine Tour; Clutch Pro Tour
- Former tour: Challenge Tour
- Professional wins: 2

Best results in major championships
- Masters Tournament: CUT: 2021
- PGA Championship: DNP
- U.S. Open: CUT: 2021
- The Open Championship: CUT: 2021

Joseph Matthew Long (born 21 May 1997) is an English professional golfer. He won the 2020 Amateur Championship. Since turning professional in 2021, he has played on the Sunshine Tour and the Challenge Tour.

== Amateur career ==
Long was runner-up in the 2018 English Amateur, losing, 6 and 5, to Thomas Thurloway in the final. In the 2020 English Amateur, he led after the stroke-play stage to be ranked as the top seed going into the match-play; he was ultimately knocked out in the quarter-finals at the 23rd hole.

Long won the 2020 Amateur Championship at Royal Birkdale, beating Joe Harvey, 4 and 3, in the final. The win gave him an entry into the 2021 Masters Tournament, U.S. Open and The Open Championship.

Long was selected for the 2021 Walker Cup, but only played in the final-day singles session due to "gastrointestinal issues" that impacted both teams. He won his match against John Pak on the 18th hole.

== Professional career ==
Long turned professional in 2021.

In August 2022, Long finished runner-up at the Vodacom Origins of Golf at De Zalze, two shots behind winner George Coetzee.

== Amateur wins ==
- 2020 The Amateur Championship

== Professional wins (2) ==
=== Clutch Pro Tour wins (1) ===
No.	Date	Tournament	Winning score	Margin of victory	Runners-up
1	7 May 2026	Caddy Comps Trophy	−10 (65-71-67=203)	2 strokes	(Wales) Jake Hapgood, (England) Jon Hopkins, (England) Sam Potter

=== Clutch Pro Tour Tier 2 wins (1) ===
No.	Date	Tournament	Winning score	Margin of victory	Runner-up
1	24 Aug 2023	Minchinhampton	−10 (61-69=130)	2 strokes	(England) Conor White

== Results in major championships ==
Tournament	2021
Masters Tournament	CUT
PGA Championship	
U.S. Open	CUT
The Open Championship	CUT

Did not play

CUT = missed the halfway cut

== Team appearances ==
Amateur

- Walker Cup (representing Great Britain and Ireland): 2021
