= Brandon Robinson-Thompson =

English professional golfer (born 1992)

Personal information
- Nickname: BRT
- Nationality: England
- Born: 25 August 1992 (age 34) Totland Bay, Isle of Wight, England
- Height: 1.76 m (5 ft 9 in)

Career
- Sport: Golf
- College: Morningside College; University of South Carolina Aiken
- Turned professional: 2017
- Current tour: European Tour
- Former tours: Challenge Tour; PGA Tour Latinoamérica; MENA Tour; PGA EuroPro Tour; Clutch Pro Tour
- Professional wins: 7

Number of wins by tour
- Challenge Tour: 2
- Other: 5

Best results in major championships
- Masters Tournament: DNP
- PGA Championship: DNP
- U.S. Open: CUT: 2024
- The Open Championship: 59th: 2023

Achievements and awards
- Peach Belt Conference Player of the Year: 2015
Medal record
Island Games
Silver medal – second place	2011 Isle of Wight	Men's individual
Silver medal – second place	2011 Isle of Wight	Men's team

Brandon Robinson-Thompson (born 25 August 1992) is an English professional golfer. In 2023, he won the Northern Ireland Open and the Irish Challenge.

== Early life and college career ==
Robinson-Thompson was born in Totland Bay, Isle of Wight in 1992, and educated at Carisbrooke College. He attended Morningside College for two years, where he won six tournaments and was the individual Great Plains Athletic Conference champion. He transferred to the University of South Carolina Aiken where he was first-team All-American and Peach Belt Conference Player of the Year in 2015. He finished top-10 in the NCAA Division II Championship individually.

== Professional career ==
Robinson-Thompson turned professional in 2017 and joined the 2018 PGA Tour Latinoamérica. In 2021, he joined the PGA EuroPro Tour where he won the 2022 Worcestershire Masters and finished 7th in the rankings, narrowly missing out on promotion to the Challenge Tour.

In 2023, he won an event in Egypt on the MENA Tour and the Northern Ireland Open, which earned him a start at the ISPS Handa World Invitational. He made it through Final Qualifying at Royal Porthcawl in Wales to join the 2023 Open Championship at Hoylake, where he finished solo 59th. The week after he was invited to the Irish Challenge which he won, securing membership of the Challenge Tour, where he finished the season ranked 22nd, missing out on graduation to the European Tour by one place, earning category 19 exemption.

Robinson-Thompson earned a spot at the 2024 U.S. Open at Pinehurst Resort in the Walton Heath qualifier, and ultimately missed the cut by a single stroke.

== Amateur wins ==
- 2014 Saint Leo Invitational

== Professional wins (7) ==
=== Challenge Tour wins (2) ===
No.	Date	Tournament	Winning score	Margin of victory	Runner(s)-up
1	30 Jul 2023	Irish Challenge	−12 (69-64-72-67=272)	2 strokes	(England) Will Enefer, (United States) Jordan Gumberg
2	11 Aug 2024	Farmfoods Scottish Challenge	−22 (67-67-62-66=262)	8 strokes	(Denmark) Hamish Brown

=== Clutch Pro Tour wins (3) ===
No.	Date	Tournament	Winning score	Margin of victory	Runner(s)-up
1	1 Jun 2023	Galvin Green Championship	−4 (68-68=136)	1 stroke	(England) Curtis Knipes
2	22 Jun 2023	Northern Ireland Open	−9 (63-69-69=201)	3 strokes	(England) Daniel Smith
3	30 Jun 2023	Machynys	−12 (68-66-70=204)	2 strokes	(England) Jake Ayres, (England) Sam Broadhurst, (England) Jake Burnage

=== PGA EuroPro Tour wins (1) ===
No.	Date	Tournament	Winning score	Margin of victory	Runners-up
1	24 Jul 2022	Glal.uk Worcestershire Masters	−7 (70-66-73=209)	2 strokes	(England) James Allan, (England) Joe Brooks, (Scotland) Jeff Wright

=== MENA Tour wins (1) ===
No.	Date	Tournament	Winning score	Margin of victory	Runner-up
1	7 Feb 2023	Egyptian Swing 2	−11 (65-67-67=199)	4 strokes	(Italy) Jacopo Vecchi Fossa

== Results in major championships ==
Tournament	2023	2024
Masters Tournament		
PGA Championship		
U.S. Open		CUT
The Open Championship	59	

Did not play

CUT = missed the half-way cut

== See also ==
- 2024 Challenge Tour graduates
