= 2014 Pro Golf Tour =

Golf tour season

2014 Pro Golf Tour season
- Duration: 20 January 2014 – 26 September 2014
- Number of official events: 20
- Most wins: (Germany) Sean Einhaus (2) (Germany) Sebastian Heisele (2) (Germany) Alexander Knappe (2) (Germany) Marcel Schneider (2)
- Order of Merit: (Germany) Marcel Schneider

The 2014 Pro Golf Tour was the 18th season of the Pro Golf Tour (formerly the EPD Tour), a third-tier tour recognised by the European Tour.

== Schedule ==
The following table lists official events during the 2014 season.

Date	Tournament	Host country	Purse (€)	Winner (Note: The number in brackets after each winner's name is the number of Pro Golf Tour events they had won up to and including that tournament. It is rare for someone to accumulate many wins on the Pro Golf Tour as success at this level usually leads to promotion to the Challenge Tour.)
22 Jan	Sueno Dunes Classic	Turkey	30,000	(Germany) Alexander Knappe (2)
26 Jan	Sueno Pines Classic	Turkey	30,000	(Germany) Nicolas Meitinger (9)
11 Feb	Open Mogador	Morocco	30,000	(Germany) Marcel Schneider (1)
17 Feb	Open Samanah	Morocco	30,000	(France) Édouard España (1)
21 Feb	Open Al Maaden	Morocco	30,000	(Germany) Moritz Lampert (2)
19 Mar	Red Sea Egyptian Classic	Egypt	30,000	(Switzerland) Ken Benz (2)
25 Mar	Red Sea Ain Sokhna Classic	Egypt	30,000	(England) Max Orrin (1)
9 Apr	Open Madaef	Morocco	30,000	(Germany) Marcel Schneider (2)
15 Apr	Open Lixus	Morocco	30,000	(Germany) Max Kramer (7)
21 Apr	Open Dar Es Salam	Morocco	30,000	(Germany) Sebastian Heisele (2)
22 May	Haugschlag NÖ Open	Austria	30,000	(Germany) Sean Einhaus (1)
27 May	Adamstal Open	Austria	30,000	(Germany) Alexander Knappe (3)
16 Jun	Ceevee Leather Open	Germany	30,000	(Germany) Anton Kirstein (2)
12 Jul	Praforst Pro Golf Tour	Germany	30,000	(Germany) Sean Einhaus (2)
22 Jul	Lotos Polish Open	Poland	30,000	(Austria) Berni Reiter (1)
29 Jul	Castanea Resort Open	Germany	30,000	(Germany) Julian Kunzenbacher (1)
12 Aug	Augsburg Classic	Germany	30,000	(Germany) Sebastian Kannler (1)
27 Aug	Gut Bissenmoor Classic	Germany	30,000	(Germany) Sebastian Heisele (3)
1 Sep	Preis des Hardenberg GolfResort	Germany	30,000	(Republic of Ireland) Richie O'Donovan (1)
26 Sep	Deutsche Bank Polish Masters Pro Golf Tour Championship	Poland	40,000	(Netherlands) Floris de Vries (2)

== Order of Merit ==
The Order of Merit was based on tournament results during the season, calculated using a points-based system. The top four players on the Order of Merit (not otherwise exempt) earned status to play on the 2015 Challenge Tour.

Position	Player	Points	Status earned
1	(Germany) Marcel Schneider	29,666	Qualified for Challenge Tour (made cut in Q School)
2	(Germany) Sebastian Heisele	23,883	Promoted to Challenge Tour
3	(Germany) Sean Einhaus	22,859	Promoted to Challenge Tour
4	(Germany) Max Kramer	21,174	Promoted to Challenge Tour
5	(Germany) Alexander Knappe	20,645	Promoted to Challenge Tour
6	(France) David Antonelli	17,833	
7	(Germany) Anton Kirstein	16,898	
8	(Netherlands) Floris de Vries	15,445	
9	(Germany) Julian Kunzenbacher	14,221	
10	(Germany) Moritz Lampert	12,797	Promoted to European Tour (Top 15 of Challenge Tour Rankings)
