= Ben Evans (golfer) =

English golfer

Personal information
- Full name: Benjamin Evans
- Nationality: England
- Born: 13 December 1986 (age 39) Maidstone, England
- Height: 1.88 m (6 ft 2 in)
- Weight: 76 kg (168 lb; 12.0 st)

Career
- Sport: Golf
- Turned professional: 2008
- Current tour: Clutch Pro Tour
- Former tours: European Tour; Challenge Tour
- Professional wins: 1

Benjamin Evans (born 13 December 1986) is an English professional golfer who has played on the European Tour.

== Education ==
Evans was educated at Claremont Preparatory School, St Leonards-on-Sea and then at Millfield School, Somerset (2000–04).

== Professional career ==
Evans finished second at The Foshan Open in 2014. This result helped him to a 17th-place finish in the Order of Merit for the 2014 Challenge Tour that gave him conditional status on the European Tour.

In 2015, Evans finished 110th on the European Tour and thus retained full status for the 2016 season. He initially was placed 111th and looked to have missed full status, but later gained full status for 2016 after Brooks Koepka relinquished his European Tour membership for 2016 and was removed from the rankings.

== Amateur wins ==
- 2005 Faldo Series International Trophy
- 2006 Sunningdale Foursomes (with Danielle Masters), Faldo Series
- 2007 Faldo Series

== Professional wins (1) ==
=== Alps Tour wins (1) ===
No.	Date	Tournament	Winning score	Margin of victory	Runner-up
1	11 Oct 2013	Sardegna Is Molas Open	−17 (65-66-68=199)	2 strokes	(England) Jason Palmer

== Team appearances ==
Amateur

- European Boys' Team Championship (representing England): 2004 (winners)

== See also ==
- 2017 European Tour Qualifying School graduates
- 2018 European Tour Qualifying School graduates
