= 2020 Clutch Pro Tour =

Golf tour season

2020 Clutch Pro Tour season
- Duration: 5 March 2020 – 22 October 2020
- Number of official events: 15
- Most wins: (England) Matthew Cort (2) (England) Tom Sloman (2)
- Order of Merit: (England) Mitch Waite

The 2020 Clutch Pro Tour was the inaugural season of the Clutch Pro Tour, a third-tier tour recognised by the European Tour.

== Schedule ==
The following table lists official events during the 2020 season.

Date	Tournament	Location	Purse (£)	Winner (Note: The number in brackets after each winner's name is the number of Clutch Pro Tour events they had won up to and including that tournament. It is rare for someone to accumulate many wins on the Clutch Pro Tour as success at this level usually leads to promotion to the Challenge Tour.)
5 Mar	Beau Desert Classic	Staffordshire	6,000	(England) Patrick Ruff (1)
20 Mar	The Shire	Staffordshire	25,000	(England) Scott Gregory (1)
22 Jun	Sandwell Park	Staffordshire	6,000	(England) Oliver Farrell (1)
29 Jun	Notts Holinwell	Nottinghamshire	25,000	(Zimbabwe) Benjamin Follett-Smith (1)
8 Jul	Open Access Masters	Berkshire	6,000	(England) Will Percival (1)
10 Jul	Golf at Goodwood	West Sussex	25,000	(England) Billy McKenzie (1)
16 Jul	Stoneham	Hampshire	25,000	(England) Andy Sullivan (1)
6 Aug	Empire Construction Open	Surrey	25,000	(England) Jacob Hassan (1)
21 Aug	Enville	Worcestershire	6,000	(England) Tom Sloman (1)
1 Sep	Cavendish	Derbyshire	6,000	(England) Matthew Cort (1)
3 Sep	Kedleston Park	Derbyshire	6,000	(England) Matthew Cort (2)
10 Sep	Surrey Shootout	Surrey	6,000	(England) Jacob Oakley (1)
21 Sep	South of England Open	Surrey	25,000	(England) Bailey Gill (1)
8 Oct	Sonning Showdown	Surrey	25,000	(England) Tom Sloman (2)
22 Oct	Tour Championship	Hertfordshire	25,000	(Scotland) Ryan Lumsden (1)

== Order of Merit ==
The Order of Merit was titled as the Race to Berkhamsted was based on tournament results during the season, calculated using a points-based system.

Position	Player	Points
1	(England) Mitch Waite	5,228
2	(England) Oliver Farrell	5,063
3	(England) Tom Sloman	5,040
