= Joe Dean (golfer) =

English professional golfer (born 1994)

Personal information
- Full name: Joseph Dean
- Nationality: England
- Born: 23 June 1994 (age 32) Sheffield, England
- Spouse: Emily (m. 2026)

Career
- Sport: Golf
- Turned professional: 2016
- Current tours: European Tour; PGA Tour
- Former tours: Challenge Tour; PGA EuroPro Tour
- Professional wins: 2

Number of wins by tour
- European Tour: 1
- Other: 1

Best results in major championships
- Masters Tournament: DNP
- PGA Championship: DNP
- U.S. Open: DNP
- The Open Championship: T25: 2024

Joseph Dean (born 23 June 1994) is an English professional golfer and European Tour player. In 2026, he won the British Masters.

== Amateur career ==
Dean was born in Sheffield and is attached to College Pines GC. In 2012, he was runner-up at the Fairhaven Trophy, and in 2013 won the Dutch Junior Open. He represented England in the Boys Home Internationals and the Men's Home Internationals.

Dean won the 2015 English Amateur at Alwoodley Golf Club, beating Alfie Plant in the final 9 and 7.

== Professional career ==
Dean turned professional in 2016 and joined the PGA EuroPro Tour. In his rookie season, he finished 10th in the rankings, and in 2017 he finished 5th. In 2019, he joined the Challenge Tour where he finished 106th. He returned to the PGA EuroPro Tour, where he won the 2021 Worcestershire Masters and finished 8th in the rankings.

Dean earned his card for the 2024 European Tour at Q-School but did not initially compete as he could not afford the travel cost around the globe to participate, and worked as a delivery driver for Morrisons supermarket.

When Dean joined the tour in February, he was runner-up in his second event, the Magical Kenya Open, and was runner-up again at the KLM Open, where he lost a playoff to Guido Migliozzi. He finished 37th on the Race to Dubai and collected over €1m in prize money, the top Q-School graduate of the season.

Dean earned a start at the 2026 Open Championship after winning the inaugural Last-Chance Qualifier, held at Royal Birkdale Golf Club on Monday of tournament week. Later in 2026, Dean earned his first European Tour win at the British Masters. He finished the 2026 season 16th in the Race to Dubai and earned his first PGA Tour card as one of the top ten non-exempt players.

== Amateur wins ==
- 2012 Dutch Junior Open
- 2013 Lee Westwood Trophy
- 2014 Lee Westwood Trophy
- 2015 English Amateur

== Professional wins (2) ==
=== European Tour wins (1) ===
No.	Date	Tournament	Winning score	Margin of victory	Runners-up
1	30 Aug 2026	Husqvarna British Masters	−14 (67-73-71-63=274)	3 strokes	(Spain) Nacho Elvira, (New Zealand) Daniel Hillier, (Denmark) Niklas Nørgaard, (Denmark) Jacob Skov Olesen

European Tour playoff record (0–1)

No.	Year	Tournament	Opponents	Result
1	2024	KLM Open	(Sweden) Marcus Kinhult, (Italy) Guido Migliozzi	Migliozzi won with birdie on second extra hole

=== PGA EuroPro Tour wins (1) ===
No.	Date	Tournament	Winning score	Margin of victory	Runners-up
1	4 Jul 2021	Glal.uk Worcestershire Masters	−15 (69-66-66=201)	3 strokes	(England) Ben Hutchinson, (Scotland) Sam Locke, (Northern Ireland) Dermot McElroy, (England) Tom Sloman

== Results in major championships ==
Tournament	2017	2018	2019	2020	2021	2023	2024	2025	2026
Masters Tournament									
PGA Championship									
U.S. Open									
The Open Championship	T70						T25		CUT

Did not play

CUT = missed the half-way cut
"T" = tied

== Team appearances ==
Amateur

- Boys Home Internationals (representing England): 2012 (winners)
- Men's Home Internationals (representing England): 2015

== See also ==
- 2023 European Tour Qualifying School graduates
- 2026 Race to Dubai dual card winners
