= Golf at the 2011 Island Games =

Golf at the 2011 Island Games was held from 28 June – 1 July 2011 at the Freshwater Bay Golf Club and Shanklin & Sandown Golf Club.

== Medal table ==
Rank	Nation	Gold	Silver	Bronze	Total
1	Isle of Man (IOM)	2	0	0	2
2	Isle of Wight (IOW)	1	3	1	5
3	Gotland (Gotland)	1	1	0	2
4	Guernsey (GGY)	0	0	2	2
5	Bermuda (BER)	0	0	1	1
Totals (5 entries)		4	4	4	12

== Events ==
Event	Gold		Silver		Bronze	
Men's individual	Paul Lowey (IOM)	273	Barandon Robinson-Thompson (Isle of Wight)	278	Damian Palanyandi (BER)	287
Men's team	Isle of Man; Tom Harris; Paul Lowey; Kevin Moore; Mark Sutton	845	Isle of Wight; George Foreman; Darren Masterton; Christopher Reed; Brandon Robinson-Thompson	856	Guernsey; Daniel Blondel; Jamie Blondel; Bobby Eggo; James Hamon	859
Women's individual	Sara Larsson (Gotland)	273	Emma Powell (Isle of Wight)	278	Sophie Beardsal (Isle of Wight)	287
Women's team	Isle of Wight; Sophie Beardsall; Sammi Keen; Emma Powell; Joanne Wright	906	Gotland; Lina Billing; Linda Helledaij; Sara Larsson; Lina Svegsjö	924	Guernsey; Di Aitchison; Janine Chamberlain; Abergail Howard; Aimee Ponte	976
