= Alpin Open =

Kitzbühel Golf Alpin Open
Tournament information
- Location: Kitzbühel, Austria
- Established: 2003
- Course: Kitzbühel Schwarzsee Golf Club
- Par: 71
- Length: 6,533 yards (5,974 m)
- Tour: Challenge Tour
- Format: Stroke play
- Prize fund: €110,000
- Month played: July
- Final year: 2003

Tournament record score
- Aggregate: 261 David Geall (2003)
- To par: −23 as above

Final champion
- (England) David Geall
- Location in Austria

The Kitzbühel Golf Alpin Open was a one-off golf tournament on the Challenge Tour played in July 2003 at Kitzbühel Schwarzsee Golf Club in Kitzbühel, Austria.

== Winners ==
Year	Winner	Score	To par	Margin of victory	Runner-up
2003	(England) David Geall	261	−23	3 strokes	(South Africa) Michael Kirk
