= Los Encinos Open =

American Express Los Encinos Open
Tournament information
- Location: Ocoyoacac, Mexico
- Established: 2002
- Course: Club de Golf Los Encinos
- Par: 72
- Length: 7,099 yards (6,491 m)
- Tours: Challenge Tour; Tour de las Américas
- Format: Stroke play
- Prize fund: €100,000
- Month played: February
- Final year: 2007

Tournament record score
- Aggregate: 275 James Hepworth (2003)
- To par: −13 as above

Final champion
- (England) James Hepworth
- Location in Mexico Location in the State of Mexico

The Los Encinos Open was a golf tournament on the Tour de las Américas that was held at Los Encinos Golf Club in Toluca, Mexico. In 2003 it was co-sanctioned with the Challenge Tour.

== Winners ==
Year	Tours (Note: CHA − Challenge Tour; TLA − Tour de las Américas.)	Winner	Score	To par	Margin of victory	Runner(s)-up
American Express Los Encinos Open
2003	CHA, TLA	(England) James Hepworth	275	−13	3 strokes	(Italy) Francesco Guermani (Mexico) José Trauwitz (England) Sam Walker
Los Encinos Open
2002	TLA	(United States) Roland Thatcher	278	−10	2 strokes	(Argentina) Rafael Gómez
