= Azerbaijan Golf Challenge Open =

Tournament information
- Location: Quba, Azerbaijan
- Established: 2014
- Course: National Azerbaijan Golf Club
- Par: 71
- Length: 6,548 yards (5,987 m)
- Tour: Challenge Tour
- Format: Stroke play
- Prize fund: €300,000
- Month played: August
- Final year: 2014

Tournament record score
- Aggregate: 272 Moritz Lampert (2014)
- To par: −16 as above

Final champion
- (Germany) Moritz Lampert
- Location in Azerbaijan

The Azerbaijan Golf Challenge Open was a golf tournament on the Challenge Tour. It was first played in August 2014 at the National Azerbaijan Golf Club in Quba, Azerbaijan. It was the first professional golf tournament in Azerbaijan.

== Winners ==
Year	Winner	Score	To par	Margin of victory	Runner-up	Ref.
2014	(Germany) Moritz Lampert	272	−16	2 strokes	(France) Mike Lorenzo-Vera	

== See also ==
- Open golf tournament
