= James Hepworth =

English golfer (born 1975)

Personal information
- Nationality: England
- Born: 10 June 1975 (age 51) Harrogate, England
- Height: 6 ft 5 in (1.96 m)
- Weight: 210 lb (95 kg; 15 st)
- Children: 1

Career
- Sport: Golf
- Turned professional: 1997
- Former tours: Challenge Tour; European Tour
- Professional wins: 5

Number of wins by tour
- Challenge Tour: 2
- Other: 3

James Hepworth (born 10 June 1975) is an English professional golfer.

== Career ==
In 1975, Hepworth was born in Harrogate, Yorkshire.

In 1997, Hepworth turned professional. He played on the Challenge Tour in 1999–2003, 2005–2006, 2008 and 2011. He earned two wins at that level: at the 2003 American Express Los Encinos Open and the 2006 Apulia San Domenico Grand Final. In both those seasons, he won promotion to the European Tour, for 2004 and 2007 respectively, but was unsuccessful at the higher level.

== Professional wins (5) ==
=== Challenge Tour wins (2) ===
Legend
Tour Championships (1)
Other Challenge Tour (1)

No.	Date	Tournament	Winning score	Margin of victory	Runners-up
1	16 Feb 2003	American Express Los Encinos Open^{1}	−13 (71-67-71-66=275)	3 strokes	(Italy) Francesco Guermani, (Mexico) José Trauwitz, (England) Sam Walker
2	21 Oct 2006	Apulia San Domenico Grand Final	−13 (69-65-68-69=271)	2 strokes	(Argentina) Rafael Echenique, (Sweden) Alex Norén, (Wales) Mark Pilkington

^{1}Co-sanctioned by the Tour de las Américas

=== PGA EuroPro Tour wins (3) ===
No.	Date	Tournament	Winning score	Margin of victory	Runner(s)-up
1	25 Jun 2010	Galgorm Castle Northern Ireland Open	−15 (63-68-70=201)	Playoff	(Australia) Daniel Gaunt
2	22 Jun 2012	WSL Open	−8 (66-69-73=208)	1 stroke	(Scotland) Paul Doherty
3	17 May 2013	Astbury Hall Classic	−8 (66-69-73=208)	Playoff	(England) David Horsey, (Scotland) Elliot Saltman

== See also ==
- 2006 Challenge Tour graduates
