= 2025 Clutch Pro Tour =

Golf tour season

2025 Clutch Pro Tour season
- Duration: 18 March 2025 – 23 October 2025
- Number of official events: 19
- Most wins: (England) Callum Farr (3) (England) David Langley (3)
- Order of Merit: (England) Callum Farr

The 2025 Clutch Pro Tour was the sixth season of the Clutch Pro Tour, a third-tier tour recognised by the European Tour.

== Schedule ==
The following table lists official events during the 2025 season.

Date	Tournament	Location	Purse (£)	Winner (Note: The number in brackets after each winner's name is the number of Clutch Pro Tour events they had won up to and including that tournament. It is rare for someone to accumulate many wins on the Clutch Pro Tour as success at this level usually leads to promotion to the Challenge Tour.)	OWGR points
20 Mar	UAE Championship	UAE	50,000	(England) Callum Farr (3)	2.22
27 Mar	La Vie Masters	Oman	50,000	(England) Giles Evans (6)	2.20
3 Apr	Al Mouj Challenge	Oman	50,000	(England) Callum Farr (4)	2.21
26 Apr	Moroccan Masters	Morocco	50,000	(South Korea) Kim Dong-won (1)	1.95
1 May	Al Houara Trophy	Morocco	50,000	(England) Jack Yule (1)	2.02
15 May	Tangier Championship	Oxfordshire	50,000	(England) Jordan Wrisdale (1)	2.50
22 May	Motocaddy Masters	Cornwall	50,000	(United States) Nick Infanti (1)	2.30
30 May	Stromberg Masters	Lincolnshire	50,000	(England) Harry Ellis (1)	2.38
5 Jun	Caddy Comps Open	Surrey	50,000	(England) David Langley (2)	2.06
20 Jun	Q Hotels Collection Open	Lincolnshire	50,000	(England) David Langley (3)	2.12
10 Jul	Rapsodo Open	Oxfordshire	50,000	(England) Josh Hilleard (1)	2.39
17 Jul	Rabat Open	Hertfordshire	50,000	(England) David Langley (4)	2.47
24 Jul	Marrakech Masters	Staffordshire	50,000	(England) Barclay Brown (1)	2.36
31 Jul	Motocaddy Championships	Worcestershire	50,000	(England) Jake McGoldrick (1)	2.22
7 Aug	Imagine Cruising Masters	Wiltshire	50,000	(England) Callum Farr (5)	2.00
15 Aug	Mannings Heath Masters	West Sussex	50,000	(England) James Claridge (2)	1.99
25 Sep	Castle Royle Masters	Berkshire	50,000	(England) Jake McGoldrick (2)	1.88
16 Oct	Mizuno Championship	UAE	50,000	(England) David Hague (1)	1.55
23 Oct	Clutch Tour Championship	UAE	100,000	(Republic of Ireland) Mark Power (1)	2.01

== Order of Merit ==
The Order of Merit was based on tournament results during the season, calculated using a points-based system. The top three players on the Order of Merit (not otherwise exempt) earned status to play on the 2026 Challenge Tour (HotelPlanner Tour).

Position	Player	Points	Status earned
1	(England) Callum Farr	2,526	Promoted to Challenge Tour
2	(England) David Langley	1,803	Promoted to Challenge Tour
3	(Republic of Ireland) James Sugrue	1,801	Promoted to Challenge Tour
4	(England) Jordan Wrisdale	1,555	
5	(England) Ryan Brooks	1,526	
6	(England) Jake McGoldrick	1,525	
7	(England) Tom Sloman	1,524	
8	(England) Josh Hilleard	1,499	
9	(England) Jack Cope	1,384	
10	(England) Harry Ellis	1,380	

== Tier 2 ==
2025 Clutch Pro Tour Tier 2 season
- Duration: 8 April 2025 – 2 October 2025
- Number of official events: 12
- Order of Merit: (England) Habebul Islam

The 2025 Clutch Pro Tour Tier 2 was the third season of the Clutch Pro Tour Tier 2, the official development tour to the Clutch Pro Tour.

=== Schedule ===
The following table lists official events during the 2025 season.

Date	Tournament	Location	Purse (£)	Winner (Note: The number in brackets after each winner's name is the number of Clutch Pro Tour Tier 2 events they had won up to and including that tournament. It is rare for someone to accumulate many wins on the Clutch Pro Tour Tier 2 as success at this level usually leads to promotion to the Clutch Pro Tour.)
9 Apr	Surrey National Championship	Surrey	20,000	(South Korea) Kim Dong-won (1)
16 Apr	Ogbourne Downs Classic	Wiltshire	20,000	(England) Jack South (1)
9 May	Lingfield Park Masters	Surrey	20,000	(England) Liam Murray (1)
11 Jun	Aldwickbury Park	Hertfordshire	20,000	(England) Jake Scarrow (1)
4 Jul	Hertfordshire Classic	Hertfordshire	25,000	(England) David Langley (1)
18 Jul	Effingham	Surrey	20,000	(England) Jake Ayres (1)
11 Aug	Mannings Heath Shootout	West Sussex	20,000	(England) Barclay Brown (1)
20 Aug	Caddy Club Challenge	West Midlands	20,000	(England) Arron Edwards-Hill (2)
27 Aug	Caddy Club Classic	Hertfordshire	20,000	(Norway) Markus Braadlie (1)
3 Sep	Agadir Invitational	Kent	20,000	(England) Jacob Hassan (1)
10 Sep	Leatherhead Classic	Surrey	20,000	(England) Charlie Crockett (1)
2 Oct	Drayton Park Tour Championship	Staffordshire	20,000	(England) Ben Hutchinson (1)

=== Order of Merit ===
The Order of Merit was based on tournament results during the season, calculated using a points-based system. The top 15 players on the Order of Merit (not otherwise exempt) earned status to play on the 2026 Clutch Pro Tour.

Position	Player	Points
1	(England) Habebul Islam	1,313
2	(Norway) Markus Braadlie	1,130
3	(England) Jake Ayres	1,126
4	(England) Arron Edwards-Hill	1,108
5	(England) Jacob Hassan	1,049
