= 2021 PGA EuroPro Tour =

Golf tour season

2021 PGA EuroPro Tour season
- Duration: 26 May 2021 – 22 October 2021
- Number of official events: 15
- Most wins: (England) Mitch Waite (2)
- Order of Merit: (England) Jamie Rutherford

The 2021 PGA EuroPro Tour was the 19th season of the PGA EuroPro Tour, a third-tier tour recognised by the European Tour.

== Schedule ==
The following table lists official events during the 2019 season.

Date	Tournament	Location	Purse (£)	Winner (Note: The number in brackets after each winner's name is the number of PGA EuroPro Tour events they had won up to and including that tournament. It is rare for someone to accumulate many wins on the PGA EuroPro Tour as success at this level usually leads to promotion to the Challenge Tour.)	OWGR points
28 May	IFX Championship	Buckinghamshire	51,710	(England) Gian-Marco Petrozzi (1)	4
11 Jun	Jessie May World Snooker Golf Championship	Berkshire	50,105	(Scotland) Conor O'Neil (1)	4
18 Jun	Cumberwell Park Championship	Wiltshire	52,680	(England) John Parry (2)	4
25 Jun	Eagle Orchid Scottish Masters	Angus	49,235	(England) Will Enefer (1)	4
2 Jul	Glal.uk Worcestershire Masters	Worcestershire	50,105	(England) Joe Dean (1)	4
16 Jul	Wright-Morgan Championship	Somersey	51,710	(United States) Stephen Shephard (1)	4
23 Jul	Orida Championship	Kent	50,660	(England) Jack Yule (1)	4
30 Jul	PDC Championship	East Sussex	49,235	(England) Jack Hawksby (1)	4
6 Aug	Nokia Masters	West Sussex	50,105	(England) Mitch Waite (1)	4
13 Aug	Cubefunder Championship	Bedfordshire	50,105	(Northern Ireland) Dermot McElroy (1)	4
20 Aug	NI Masters	County Down	50,385	(Republic of Ireland) Simon Thornton (2)	4
3 Sep	Studley Wood Championship	Oxfordshire	49,280	(England) Mitch Waite (2)	4
10 Sep	Motocaddy Masters	Fife	49,530	(England) Jack South (1)	4
17 Sep	Castletown Golf Links	Isle of Man	50,385	(Scotland) Calum Fyfe (1)	4
22 Oct	Matchroom Tour Championship	Northumberland	102,460	(England) Jamie Rutherford (2)	4

== Order of Merit ==
The Order of Merit was based on prize money won during the season, calculated in Pound sterling. The top five players on the Order of Merit earned status to play on the 2022 Challenge Tour.

Position	Player	Prize money (£)	Status earned
1	(England) Jamie Rutherford	41,322	Promoted to Challenge Tour
2	(England) Mitch Waite	39,880	Promoted to Challenge Tour
3	(Scotland) Calum Fyfe	28,800	Promoted to Challenge Tour
4	(England) Dan Brown	23,194	Promoted to Challenge Tour
5	(England) John Parry	23,143	Promoted to Challenge Tour
6	(England) Will Enefer	20,889	
7	(Northern Ireland) Dermot McElroy	20,230	
8	(England) Joe Dean	19,594	
9	(England) Tom Sloman	18,495	
10	(Scotland) Jack McDonald	17,558	
