= 2024 Clutch Pro Tour =

Golf tour season

2024 Clutch Pro Tour season
- Duration: 30 April 2024 – 27 September 2024
- Number of official events: 17
- Most wins: (England) Callan Barrow (2) (England) Ryan Evans (2) (England) John Gough (2) (England) Olly Huggins (2)
- Order of Merit: (England) Callan Barrow

The 2024 Clutch Pro Tour, titled as the 2024 Mizuno Next Gen Series for sponsorships reasons, was the fifth season of the Clutch Pro Tour, a third-tier tour recognised by the European Tour.

== Challenge Tour status ==
In December 2023, it was confirmed that an additional player (three in total) from the Clutch Pro Tour Order of Merit would be awarded Challenge Tour status for the following season.

== OWGR inclusion ==
In April, it was announced that all Clutch Pro Tour events that fall into Tier 1, beginning in May, would receive Official World Golf Ranking points.

== Schedule ==
The following table lists official events during the 2024 season.

Date	Tournament	Location	Purse (£)	Winner (Note: The number in brackets after each winner's name is the number of Clutch Pro Tour events they had won up to and including that tournament. It is rare for someone to accumulate many wins on the Clutch Pro Tour as success at this level usually leads to promotion to the Challenge Tour.)	OWGR points
2 May	Heythrop Park	Oxfordshire	50,000	(England) Olly Huggins (1)	1.09
8 May	Brocket Hall Masters	Hertfordshire	50,000	(England) Gary King (1)	1.12
16 May	Frilford Heath Red	Oxfordshire	50,000	(England) Olly Huggins (2)	1.12
23 May	Cumberwell Park	Wiltshire	50,000	(England) John Gough (1)	1.15
30 May	Q Hotels Collection Championship	Lincolnshire	50,000	(England) Ryan Cornfield (1)	1.13
7 Jun	Bowood	Wiltshire	50,000	(England) Callan Barrow (1)	1.04
13 Jun	Manor House	Wiltshire	50,000	(England) Ryan Evans (2)	1.02
20 Jun	Caversham	Berkshire	50,000	(England) John Gough (2)	1.10
11 Jul	Studley Wood	Oxfordshire	50,000	(Wales) Luke Harries (1)	1.20
19 Jul	Underpin Masters	Northumberland	100,000	(England) David Langley (1)	1.24
1 Aug	Redditch Masters	Worcestershire	50,000	(England) Callum Farr (2)	1.13
8 Aug	St Mellion	Cornwall	50,000	(England) Tom Sloman (3)	0.96
16 Aug	Mannings Heath	West Sussex	50,000	(England) Ryan Evans (3)	1.20
23 Aug	Rapsodo Open	Oxfordshire	50,000	(England) Angus Flanagan (1)	1.32
4 Sep	Kedleston Park	Derbyshire	50,000	(England) Daniel Smith (1)	0.90
12 Sep	Motocaddy Masters	Buckinghamshire	50,000	(Northern Ireland) John-Ross Galbraith (1)	1.41
27 Sep	Tour Championship	Norfolk	50,000	(England) Callan Barrow (2)	1.07

=== Unofficial events ===
The following events were sanctioned by the Clutch Pro Tour, but did not carry official money, nor were wins official.

Date	Tournament	Location	Purse (£)	Winner
14 Mar	Al Hamra Championship	UAE	30,000	(England) Callan Barrow
21 Mar	Al Zorah Masters	UAE	30,000	(England) Jack Yule

== Order of Merit ==
The Order of Merit was titled as the Race to Royal Norwich and was based on tournament results during the season, calculated using a points-based system. The top three players on the Order of Merit (not otherwise exempt) earned status to play on the 2025 Challenge Tour (HotelPlanner Tour).

Position	Player	Points	Status earned
1	(England) Callan Barrow	1,970	Qualified for Challenge Tour (made cut in Q School)
2	(England) Gary King	1,729	Promoted to Challenge Tour
3	(England) Ryan Evans	1,681	Promoted to Challenge Tour
4	(England) John Gough	1,467	Promoted to Challenge Tour
5	(England) Callum Farr	1,440	
6	(England) Olly Huggins	1,338	
7	(England) Daniel Smith	1,298	
8	(England) David Langley	1,220	
9	(England) Thomas Thurloway	1,080	
10	(England) David Hague	1,049	

== Tier 2 ==
2024 Clutch Pro Tour Tier 2 season
- Duration: 30 April 2024 – 18 September 2024
- Number of official events: 12
- Most wins: (England) Piers Berrington (2) (Republic of Ireland) Jack Madden (2)
- Order of Merit: (Republic of Ireland) Jack Madden

The 2024 Clutch Pro Tour Tier 2 was the second season of the Clutch Pro Tour Tier 2, the official development tour to the Clutch Pro Tour.

=== Schedule ===
The following table lists official events during the 2024 season.

Date	Tournament	Location	Purse (£)	Winner (Note: The number in brackets after each winner's name is the number of Clutch Pro Tour Tier 2 events they had won up to and including that tournament. It is rare for someone to accumulate many wins on the Clutch Pro Tour Tier 2 as success at this level usually leads to promotion to the Clutch Pro Tour.)
1 May	Aldwickbury Park	Hertfordshire	20,000	(England) Arron Edwards-Hill (1)
16 May	Tandridge	Surrey	20,000	(Republic of Ireland) Jack Madden (1)
22 May	Golf at Goodwood	West Sussex	20,000	(England) Joe Sykes (1)
31 May	Clandon Regis	Surrey	20,000	(England) Angus Flanagan (1)
6 Jun	Drayton Park	Oxfordshire	20,000	(England) Thomas Spreadborough (1)
20 Jun	Lingfield Park	Surrey	20,000	(England) Piers Berrington (1)
5 Jul	Leatherhead Club	Surrey	20,000	(England) Piers Berrington (2)
11 Jul	Effingham	Surrey	20,000	(England) Gary King (2)
24 Jul	Oxford	Oxfordshire	20,000	(England) George Bloor (1)
7 Aug	Luton Hoo	Bedfordshire	20,000	(England) Billy McKenzie (1)
21 Aug	Pyrford Lakes	Surrey	20,000	(Republic of Ireland) Jack Madden (2)
18 Sep	Studley Wood Tour Championship	Oxfordshire	20,000	(England) Rhys Nevin (1)

=== Order of Merit ===
The Order of Merit was based on tournament results during the season, calculated using a points-based system. The top 15 players on the Order of Merit earned status to play on the 2025 Clutch Pro Tour.

Position	Player	Points
1	(Republic of Ireland) Jack Madden	1,655
2	(England) Reece Samson	1,266
3	(England) Markus Braadlie	1,131
4	(England) Piers Berrington	959
5	(England) Thomas Spreadborough	940
