= Scott Gregory (golfer) =

English professional golfer

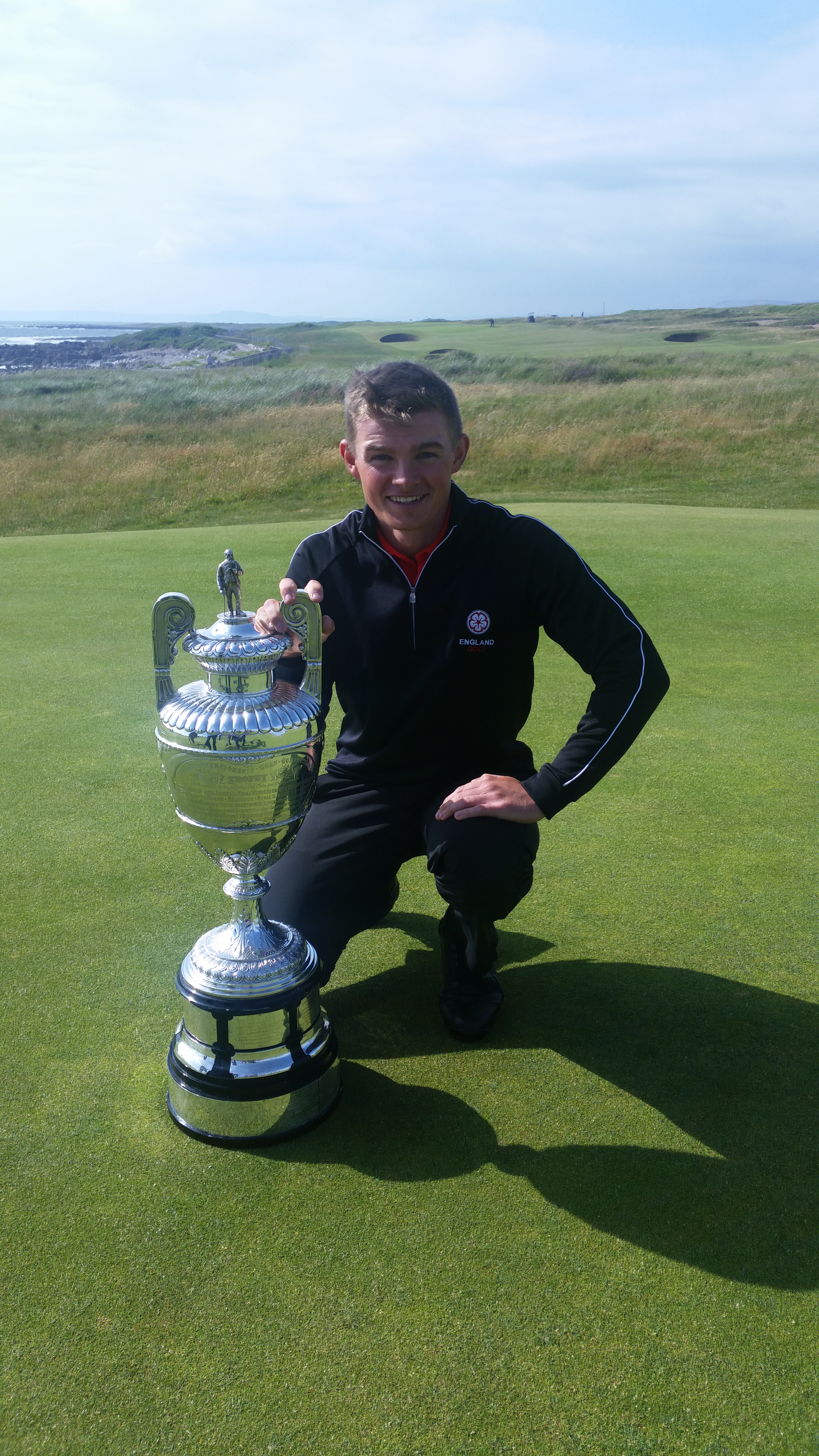
- Gregory with the Amateur Championship trophy

Personal information
- Full name: Scott Samuel Gregory
- Nationality: England
- Born: 1 October 1994 (age 32) Portsmouth, Hampshire, England
- Height: 5 ft 8 in (1.73 m)

Career
- Sport: Golf
- Turned professional: 2017
- Current tour: European Tour
- Professional wins: 1

Best results in major championships
- Masters Tournament: CUT: 2017
- PGA Championship: DNP
- U.S. Open: CUT: 2017, 2018
- The Open Championship: CUT: 2016

Scott Samuel Gregory (born 1 October 1994) is an English professional golfer. He won the 2016 Amateur Championship at Royal Porthcawl Golf Club, beating Robert MacIntyre 2&1 in the final, becoming the first Hampshire-born player to win the Championship.

== Early career ==
Gregory first began the game going to the driving range with his father when he was about five years old and took to the game right away. As he got older, he went to the local pitch and putt courses where he was able to develop his short game and scoring until he was good enough to progress onto a proper golf course. The next step came when he was eight years old when he joined his local course which is Portsmouth Golf Club where he first started playing competitive golf. He played in junior matches and got his first handicap of 28 when he was nine years old. He played there for a couple of years before joining Waterlooville Golf Club and this is where he would play the majority of his junior golf.

In 2009 he joined Corhampton Golf Club where he is still based today. It was a natural progression for him as he needed somewhere where the condition was dry enough to practice all year round. Corhampton has superb practice facilities and is built on chalk. He saw the benefits straight away and won the club championships in 2010 at the age of 15.

== Amateur career ==
In 2014 he was runner-up in the English Amateur at Saunton losing 2&1 to Nick Marsh and in 2016 he was runner-up in the Spanish Amateur Championship, losing 9&8 in the final to Romain Langasque, the 2015 Amateur champion.

Later in 2016 he won the 2016 Amateur Championship at Royal Porthcawl Golf Club, beating Robert MacIntyre 2&1 in the final. This gave him entry to the 2016 Open Championship, the 2017 Masters Tournament and the 2017 U.S. Open. In his first round in the Open he was 4-under-par after 10 holes but dropped 11 shots in the last 8 holes to finish with a 7-over-par 78. He had a second round 73 and missed the cut. In the Masters he scored 82 and 75 and missed the cut, although he had an eagle 3 at the second hole of his second round. In the U.S. Open he had rounds of 75 and 73 to miss the cut by 3.

His current home club is Corhampton, Hampshire.

== Professional career ==
Gregory turned professional after playing in the 2017 Walker Cup. He played a few events towards the end of 2017 and finished tied for 8th place in the Challenge de España. He struggled with injury in 2018 and had little success. He qualified for the 2018 U.S. Open, scoring 67 and 69 in sectional qualifying at Walton Heath Golf Club, his first major championship as a professional. He scored 92 in the first round of the U.S. Open, including 10 bogeys, 3 double-bogeys and 2 triple-bogeys and, despite a second round 75, finished last of the 156 competitors. However, the season ended successfully when he earned a 2019 European Tour card through Q School after finishing tied for 11th place in the 6-round final stage.

== Amateur wins ==
- 2014 Waterford Trophy
- 2016 Amateur Championship
- 2017 NSW Amateur, Georgia Cup

== Professional wins (1) ==
=== Clutch Pro Tour wins (1) ===
No.	Date	Tournament	Winning score	Margin of victory	Runner-up
1	20 Mar 2020	The Shire	−6 (66)	1 stroke	(England) James Mack

== Results in major championships ==
Tournament	2016	2017	2018
Masters Tournament		CUT	
U.S. Open		CUT	CUT
The Open Championship	CUT		
PGA Championship			

Did not play

CUT = missed the half-way cut

== Team appearances ==
Amateur

- European Amateur Team Championship (representing England): 2016, 2017
- St Andrews Trophy (representing Great Britain and Ireland): 2016 (tie)
- Eisenhower Trophy (representing England): 2016
- Walker Cup (representing Great Britain & Ireland): 2017

== See also ==
- 2018 European Tour Qualifying School graduates
