= 2013 Alps Tour =

Golf tour season

2013 Alps Tour season
- Duration: 26 February 2013 – 20 October 2013
- Number of official events: 17
- Most wins: (England) Jason Palmer (3)
- Order of Merit: (England) Jason Palmer

The 2013 Alps Tour was the 13th season of the Alps Tour, a third-tier tour golf recognised by the European Tour.

== Schedule ==
The following table lists official events during the 2013 season.

Date	Tournament	Host country	Purse (€)	Winner (Note: The number in brackets after each winner's name is the number of Alps Tour events they had won up to and including that tournament. It is rare for someone to accumulate many wins on the Alps Tour as success at this level usually leads to promotion to the Challenge Tour.)
28 Feb	Red Sea Ein Bay Open	Egypt	30,000	(England) Andrew Cooley (1)
7 Mar	Red Sea Little Venice Open	Egypt	30,000	(England) Andrew Cooley (2)
6 Apr	Alps de Las Castillas	Spain	48,000	(Spain) Raúl Quirós (1)
3 May	Open International de Rebetz	France	40,000	(Spain) Borja Etchart (1)
19 May	Gösser Open	Austria	40,000	(Republic of Ireland) Brendan McCarroll (3)
25 May	Umbria Open	Italy	50,000	(Spain) Jesús Legarrea (1)
1 Jun	Friuli Venezia Giulia Open Grado	Italy	40,000	(England) Jason Palmer (2)
8 Jun	Open de Saint François Region Guadeloupe	Guadeloupe	45,000	(France) Sébastien Gros (2)
14 Jun	Peugeot Open	Spain	48,000	(France) Édouard España (1)
23 Jun	Open de la Mirabelle d'Or	France	45,000	(England) Steven Brown (1)
20 Jul	Alps de Andalucía	Spain	48,000	(Spain) Pol Bech (1)
31 Aug	Cervino Open	Italy	40,000	(England) Jason Palmer (3)
7 Sep	Golf Asiago Open	Italy	40,000	(England) Steven Brown (2)
15 Sep	Citadelle Trophy International	France	45,000	(England) Jason Palmer (4)
22 Sep	Open du Haut Poitou	France	40,000	(France) David Bobrowski (1)
11 Oct	Sardegna Is Molas Open	Italy	40,000	(England) Ben Evans (1)
20 Oct	Masters 13	France	50,000	(France) Édouard España (2)

== Order of Merit ==
The Order of Merit was based on tournament results during the season, calculated using a points-based system. The top five players on the Order of Merit (not otherwise exempt) earned status to play on the 2014 Challenge Tour.

Position	Player	Points	Status earned
1	(England) Jason Palmer	36,660	Promoted to Challenge Tour
2	(France) Édouard España	24,390	Qualified for Challenge Tour (made cut in Q School)
3	(England) Steven Brown	20,696	Promoted to Challenge Tour
4	(England) Ben Evans	19,537	Qualified for Challenge Tour (made cut in Q School)
5	(Austria) Lukas Nemecz	19,326	Promoted to Challenge Tour
6	(Spain) Jesús Legarrea	17,867	Promoted to Challenge Tour
7	(France) Thomas Linard	15,438	Promoted to Challenge Tour
8	(England) Andrew Cooley	15,415	
9	(Republic of Ireland) Brendan McCarroll	13,163	
10	(Austria) Uli Weinhandl	12,086	
