= 2010 PGA EuroPro Tour =

Golf tour season

2010 PGA EuroPro Tour season
- Duration: 27 April 2010 – 2 October 2010
- Number of official events: 14
- Most wins: (England) Matt Evans (2)
- Order of Merit: (Australia) Daniel Gaunt

The 2010 PGA EuroPro Tour was the ninth season of the PGA EuroPro Tour, a third-tier tour recognised by the European Tour.

== Schedule ==
The following table lists official events during the 2010 season.

Date	Tournament	Location	Purse (£)	Winner (Note: The number in brackets after each winner's name is the number of PGA EuroPro Tour events they had won up to and including that tournament. It is rare for someone to accumulate many wins on the PGA EuroPro Tour as success at this level usually leads to promotion to the Challenge Tour.)
29 Apr	Motocaddy Masters	Norfolk	40,110	(Australia) Daniel Gaunt (4)
28 May	Pandora Open	Surrey	39,380	(England) Robert Steele (2)
4 Jun	Castle Dargan Irish Masters	Ireland	40,445	(England) Ian Keenan (1)
11 Jun	Dawson & Sanderson Classic	Northumberland	39,185	(England) Stuart Archibald (1)
18 Jun	Dunlop Masters	Devon	40,110	(Scotland) Craig Lee (1)
25 Jun	Galgorm Castle Northern Ireland Open	County Antrim	39,935	(England) James Hepworth (1)
1 Jul	Stoke by Nayland	Suffolk	39,570	(England) Gary Wolstenholme (1)
16 Jul	World Snooker Golf Championship	Bristol	40,110	(England) Matt Evans (1)
6 Aug	Formby Hall	Merseyside	39,380	(England) Nick McCarthy (1)
12 Aug	ABC Solutions UK Championship	Cheshire	40,280	(England) Zane Scotland (1)
19 Aug	SkyCaddie European Championships	Kent	40,605	(England) Matt Evans (2)
27 Aug	Veka & Network Veka UK Open	Northumberland	40,280	(England) James Robinson (1)
10 Sep	Brooks Bros Classic	Essex	40,280	(England) Paul Maddy (2)
2 Oct	Marfin Popular Bank EuroPro Tour Championship	Cyprus	61,910	(England) James Heath (1)

== Order of Merit ==
The Order of Merit was based on prize money won during the season, calculated in Pound sterling. The top five players on the Order of Merit (not otherwise exempt) earned status to play on the 2011 Challenge Tour.

Position	Player	Prize money (£)	Status earned
1	(Australia) Daniel Gaunt	24,700	Promoted to European Tour (Top 15 of Challenge Tour Rankings)
2	(England) Matt Evans	24,123	Promoted to Challenge Tour
3	(England) James Hepworth	24,020	Promoted to Challenge Tour
4	(England) James Heath	23,169	Promoted to Challenge Tour
5	(Scotland) Craig Lee	19,237	Finished in Top 80 of Challenge Tour Rankings
6	(England) Nick McCarthy	16,743	Promoted to Challenge Tour
7	(England) Ian Keenan	16,316	Promoted to Challenge Tour
8	(England) James Busby	15,747	
9	(England) Matt Allen	15,736	
10	(England) Paul Maddy	15,195	
