= English Challenge =

Golf tournament on the Challenge Tour

Tournament information
- Location: Luton Hoo, England
- Established: 1993
- Course: Luton Hoo
- Par: 71
- Length: 6,983 yards (6,385 m)
- Tour: Challenge Tour
- Format: Stroke Play
- Prize fund: €180,000
- Month played: September
- Final year: 2018

Tournament record score
- Aggregate: 259 Thomas Detry (2016)
- To par: −29 as above

Final champion
- (England) Tom Lewis

The English Challenge was a golf tournament on the Challenge Tour, played in England.

== History ==
The event was held for the first time in 1993 as the Collingtree Park Challenge and was played as the Stockley Park Challenge in 1994. There was a nine-year break before it made a one-off return in 2004 as the Donnington Grove Computacenter English Challenge Open.

The English Challenge returned to the schedule again in 2010 at Stoke by Nayland Hotel, Golf & Spa in Stoke-by-Nayland, Suffolk. Australia's Daniel Gaunt won the tournament by one stroke from English amateur Tommy Fleetwood and Scotland's Craig Lee. The event was played Stoke by Nayland again in 2011 and 2012.

The event returned again in 2016 at the Heythrop Park Resort in Enstone as the Bridgestone Challenge. In 2017, it moved to Luton Hoo and used modified Stableford scoring system. The 2018 event was again at Luton Hoo but returned to the 72-hole stroke play format.

== Winners ==
Year	Winner	Score	To par	Margin of victory	Runner(s)-up	Venue
Bridgestone Challenge
2018	(England) Tom Lewis	261	−23	5 strokes	(Australia) Dimitrios Papadatos (Sweden) Sebastian Söderberg	Luton Hoo
2017	(Sweden) Oscar Lengdén	49 points		2 points	(Germany) Nicolai von Dellingshausen	Luton Hoo
2016	(Belgium) Thomas Detry	259	−29	12 strokes	(South Africa) Thriston Lawrence	Heythrop Park
English Challenge
2013–2015: No tournament
2012	(England) Chris Paisley	272	−16	2 strokes	(England) Francis McGuirk	Stoke by Nayland
2011	(France) Benjamin Hébert	276	−12	2 strokes	(France) Victor Riu	Stoke by Nayland
2010	(Australia) Daniel Gaunt	271	−17	1 stroke	(England) Tommy Fleetwood (a) (Scotland) Craig Lee	Stoke by Nayland
Donnington Grove Computacenter English Challenge Open
2005–2009: No tournament
2004	(England) Matthew King	272	−16	3 strokes	(Republic of Ireland) David Higgins	Donnington Grove
Stockley Park Challenge
1995–2003: No tournament
1994	(England) Ricky Willison	280	−8	Playoff	(Sweden) Jarmo Sandelin	Stockley Park
Collingtree Park Challenge
1993	(Republic of Ireland) Kevin Morris	286		2 strokes	(Sweden) Olle Nordberg	Collingtree Park
