= 2009 EPD Tour =

Golf tour season

2009 EPD Tour season
- Duration: 27 January 2009 – 4 October 2009
- Number of official events: 18
- Most wins: (Scotland) Craig Lee (2) (Denmark) Steen Ottosen (2) (Germany) Bernd Ritthammer (2)
- Order of Merit: (Germany) Bernd Ritthammer

The 2009 EPD Tour, titled as the 2009 Renault EPD Tour for sponsorship reasons, was the 13th season of the EPD Tour, a third-tier tour recognised by the European Tour.

== Schedule ==
The following table lists official events during the 2009 season.

| Date | Tournament | Host country | Purse (€) | Winner (Note: The number in brackets after each winner's name is the number of EPD Tour events they had won up to and including that tournament. It is rare for someone to accumulate many wins on the EPD Tour as success at this level usually leads to promotion to the Challenge Tour.) | Other tours (Note: NGL − Nordic Golf League.) |
|---|---|---|---|---|---|
| 29 Jan | Sueno Pines Classic | Turkey | 25,000 | (Scotland) Craig Lee (1) | |
| 2 Feb | Sueno Dunes Classic | Turkey | 25,000 | (Scotland) Craig Lee (2) | |
| 7 Feb | Lykia Links Classic | Turkey | 25,000 | (Germany) Dennis Küpper (5) | |
| 29 Apr | Sempachersee Classic | Switzerland | 30,000 | (England) Lee Corfield (3) | |
| 7 May | Gut Winterbrock Classic | Germany | 30,000 | (Germany) Florian Fritsch (1) | |
| 24 May | Drei Thermen Golfresort Baden Württemberg Open | Germany | 30,000 | (Germany) Bernd Ritthammer (1) | |
| 10 Jun | Augsburg Classic | Germany | 30,000 | (Germany) Christopher Trunzer (1) | |
| 17 Jun | Licher Classic | Germany | 30,000 | (Germany) Marcel Haremza (7) | |
| 24 Jun | Bohemia Franzensbad Classic | Czech Republic | 30,000 | (Netherlands) Floris de Vries (1) | |
| 30 Jun | Coburg Brose Open | Germany | 30,000 | (Denmark) Steen Ottosen (1) | |
| 8 Jul | Land Fleesensee Classic | Germany | 30,000 | (Germany) Daniel Wünsche (1) | |
| 15 Jul | Heidelberg Lobenfeld Classic | Germany | 30,000 | (Denmark) Steen Ottosen (2) | |
| 29 Jul | Green Eagle Classic | Germany | 30,000 | (Germany) Constantin Schwierz (1) | NGL |
| 5 Aug | Golf Valley Munich Classic | Germany | 30,000 | (Germany) Sebastian Bühl (1) | |
| 12 Aug | Bad Waldsee Classic | Germany | 30,000 | (Netherlands) Richard Kind (1) | |
| 26 Aug | Haus Bey Classic | Germany | 30,000 | (Germany) Stephan Gross (1) | |
| 9 Sep | Preis des Hardenberg GolfResort | Germany | 30,000 | (Germany) Bernd Ritthammer (2) | |
| 4 Oct | Fulda EPD Tour Championship | Germany | 30,000 | (Germany) Jochen Lupprian (3) | |

=== Unofficial events ===
The following events were sanctioned by the EPD Tour, but did not carry official money, nor were wins official.

| Date | Tournament | Host country | Purse (€) | Winner |
|---|---|---|---|---|
| 10 Dec | Samanah Masters | Morocco | 70,000 | (England) Daniel Brooks |

== Order of Merit ==
The Order of Merit was based on prize money won during the season, calculated in Euros. The top five players on the Order of Merit earned status to play on the 2010 Challenge Tour.

| Position | Player | Prize money (€) | Status earned |
|---|---|---|---|
| 1 | (Germany) Bernd Ritthammer | 25,319 | Promoted to Challenge Tour |
| 2 | (Denmark) Steen Ottosen | 23,092 | Promoted to Challenge Tour |
| 3 | (Netherlands) Richard Kind | 20,397 | Promoted to Challenge Tour |
| 4 | (Germany) Sebastian Bühl | 20,338 | Promoted to Challenge Tour |
| 5 | (Netherlands) Floris de Vries | 19,420 | Promoted to Challenge Tour |
| 6 | (England) Lee Corfield | 17,681 | |
| 7 | (Germany) Christopher Trunzer | 17,516 | |
| 8 | (Germany) Marcel Haremza | 15,765 | |
| 9 | (Germany) Jochen Lupprian | 13,865 | |
| 10 | (England) Grant Jackson | 13,785 | |
