= Simon Thornton =

Irish professional golfer (born 1977)

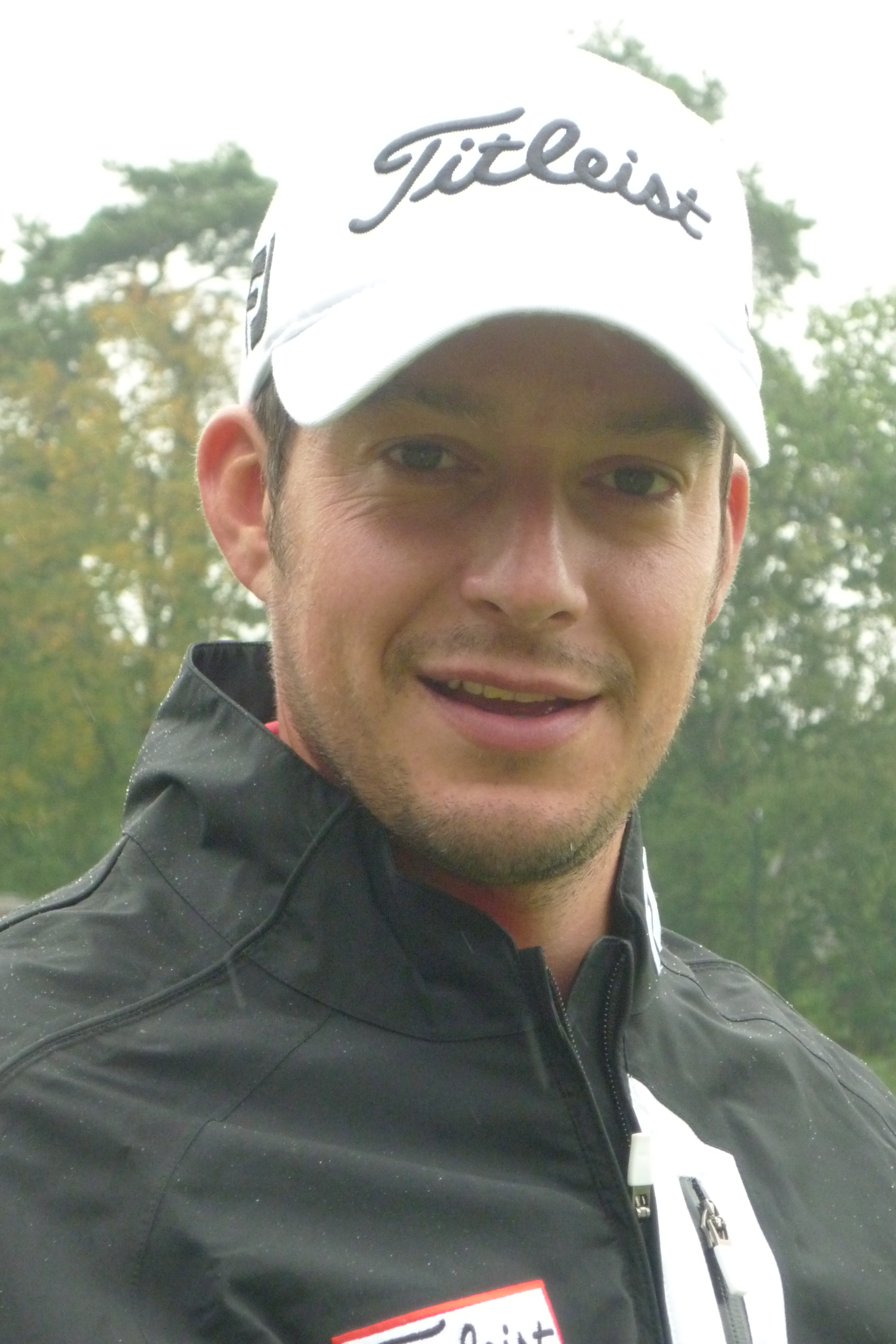
- Thornton at the 2010 KLM Open

Personal information
- Nationality: Ireland
- Born: 18 March 1977 (age 49) Bradford, England
- Height: 6 ft 0 in (1.83 m)
- Weight: 160 lb (73 kg; 11 st)
- Spouse: Ciara (m. 2004)

Career
- Sport: Golf
- Turned professional: 2005
- Former tours: European Tour; Challenge Tour; PGA EuroPro Tour
- Professional wins: 7

Number of wins by tour
- European Tour: 1
- Challenge Tour: 1
- Other: 6

Simon Thornton (born 18 March 1977) is an Irish professional golfer. He won the 2013 Najeti Hotels et Golfs Open on the European Tour.

== Career ==
Thornton was a late starter to golf, only taking up the sport in his late teens and turning professional at the advanced age of 28. He began as an assistant club professional at Royal County Down, playing in regional Irish PGA events, where his achievements included recording four straight monthly wins with the Ulster Golfers Alliance. He began playing on the Challenge Tour in 2009, finishing 51st before earning his European Tour card at qualifying school at the end of the season. His debut season on the full tour was unsuccessful, and he returned to the Challenge Tour for 2011, finishing in 12th position to secure a quick return to the European Tour. In June 2013 won the Najeti Hotels et Golfs Open in France, beating Tjaart van der Walt at the first hole on a sudden-death playoff. His win gave him an exemption of the European Tour until the end of 2014. 2014 was, however, a poor season and in 2015 he played a mixture of European Tour and Challenge Tour events but failed to retain his card on either tour.

== Professional wins (7) ==
=== European Tour wins (1) ===
No.	Date	Tournament	Winning score	Margin of victory	Runner-up
1	16 Jun 2013	Najeti Hotels et Golfs Open^{1}	−5 (74-70-65-70=279)	Playoff	(South Africa) Tjaart van der Walt

^{1}Dual-ranking event with the Challenge Tour

European Tour playoff record (1–0)

No.	Year	Tournament	Opponent	Result
1	2013	Najeti Hotels et Golfs Open	(South Africa) Tjaart van der Walt	Won with par on first extra hole

=== Challenge Tour wins (1) ===
No.	Date	Tournament	Winning score	Margin of victory	Runner-up
1	16 Jun 2013	Najeti Hotels et Golfs Open^{1}	−5 (74-70-65-70=279)	Playoff	(South Africa) Tjaart van der Walt

^{1}Dual-ranking event with the European Tour

Challenge Tour playoff record (1–0)

No.	Year	Tournament	Opponent	Result
1	2013	Najeti Hotels et Golfs Open	(South Africa) Tjaart van der Walt	Won with par on first extra hole

=== PGA EuroPro Tour wins (2) ===
No.	Date	Tournament	Winning score	Margin of victory	Runner(s)-up
1	20 Jun 2008	Bovey Castle Championship	−6 (70-68-66=204)	4 strokes	(Republic of Ireland) Noel Fox, (England) Martin LeMesurier
2	20 Aug 2021	NI Masters	−14 (60-72-67=199)	2 strokes	(England) David Langley

=== Other wins (4) ===
- 2005 Ulster PGA Championship
- 2011 Irish PGA Championship
- 2018 Irish PGA Championship
- 2020 Irish PGA Championship

== Team appearances ==
Professional

- PGA Cup (representing Great Britain and Ireland): 2022, 2026 (winners)

== See also ==
- 2009 European Tour Qualifying School graduates
- 2011 Challenge Tour graduates
