= 2021 Clutch Pro Tour =

Golf tour season

2021 Clutch Pro Tour season
- Duration: 1 April 2021 – 13 October 2021
- Number of official events: 22
- Most wins: (England) Giles Evans (2) (England) Curtis Knipes (2) (England) Nathan Longley (2) (England) Henry Sheridan-Mills (2)
- Order of Merit: (Australia) Daniel Gaunt

The 2021 Clutch Pro Tour was the second season of the Clutch Pro Tour, a third-tier tour recognised by the European Tour.

== Schedule ==
The following table lists official events during the 2021 season.

Date	Tournament	Location	Purse (£)	Winner (Note: The number in brackets after each winner's name is the number of Clutch Pro Tour events they had won up to and including that tournament. It is rare for someone to accumulate many wins on the Clutch Pro Tour as success at this level usually leads to promotion to the Challenge Tour.)
7 Apr	Prince's Classic	Kent	6,000	(England) Harley Smith (a) (1)
20 Apr	The Belfry	Warwickshire	16,000	(England) Curtis Knipes (1)
28 Apr	The Oxfordshire	Oxfordshire	12,500	(England) Oliver Farrell (2)
5 May	Mojo Masters	Worcestershire	30,000	(England) Callum Farr (1)
11 May	Remedy Oak Classic	Dorset	7,000	(England) Curtis Knipes (2)
24 May	Golfers CBD Invitational	Surrey	10,400	(England) Haider Hussain (1)
15 Jun	Northern Ireland Open	Northern Ireland	10,000	(Republic of Ireland) John Murphy (1)
22 Jun	Kedleston Park Classic	Derbyshire	14,000	(England) Henry Sheridan-Mills (1)
2 Jul	Sonning Classic	Surrey	8,000	(England) Harry Boyle (1)
5 Jul	Frilford Heath Classic	Oxfordshire	8,000	(England) Steve Surry (1)
13 Jul	Modest! Golf Championship	Hampshire	13,000	(England) Matthew Cort (3)
21 Jul	Bluespace Media South of England Open	Hertfordshire	30,000	(England) Henry Sheridan-Mills (2)
3 Aug	Foxhills (Bernard Hunt) Classic	Surrey	8,000	(England) Daniel Brooks (1)
12 Aug	DD Accountancy Open	Hampshire	14,000	(England) Nick McCarthy (1)
19 Aug	Golf at Goodwood Classic	West Sussex	15,000	(England) Nathan Longley (a) (1)
23 Aug	Royal Ashdown Forest	East Sussex	11,000	(England) Nathan Longley (a) (2)
6 Sep	Warwick House Classic	Warwickshire	7,000	(England) Corey Sheppard (1)
16 Sep	Simplicity Digital Shootout	Surrey	7,000	(England) Giles Evans (1)
22 Sep	Clutch Tour Championship	Worcestershire	30,000	(England) James Claridge (a) (1)
25 Sep	Open Access Masters	Berkshire	4,500	(England) Giles Evans (2)
7 Oct	Berkhamsted Classic	Hertfordshire	8,000	(England) Bailey Gill (2)
13 Oct	Bluespace Media Classic	Oxfordshire	12,500	(England) Will Enefer (1)

=== Unofficial events ===
The following events were sanctioned by the Clutch Pro Tour, but did not carry official money, nor were wins official.

Date	Tournament	Location	Purse (£)	Winner
1 Dec	Gloria Pro-Am	Turkey	10,000	(England) Michael Bullen
5 Dec	Gloria Super Series 1	Turkey	10,000	(England) Jake Burnage
9 Dec	Gloria Super Series 2	Turkey	10,000	(England) David Hague
11 Dec	Gloria Super Series 3	Turkey	10,000	(England) Jake Burnage

== Order of Merit ==
The Order of Merit was based on tournament results during the season, calculated using a points-based system.

Position	Player	Points
1	(Australia) Daniel Gaunt	3,063
2	(England) Giles Evans	2,278
3	(England) Harry Boyle	1,869
4	(England) Henry Sheridan-Mills	1,507
5	(England) Curtis Knipes	1,467
