= Al Ahram-Jolie Ville Sharm El Sheikh Challenge =

Tournament information
- Location: Sharm El Sheikh, Egypt
- Established: 2004
- Course: Jolie Ville Golf Resort
- Par: 70
- Length: 6,546 yards (5,986 m)
- Tour: Challenge Tour
- Format: Stroke play
- Prize fund: US$125,000
- Month played: April
- Final year: 2004

Tournament record score
- Aggregate: 265 Gareth Davies (2004)
- To par: −15 as above

Current champion
- (England) Gareth Davies

Final champion
- Location in Egypt

The Al Ahram-Jolie Ville Sharm El Sheikh Challenge was a golf tournament on the Challenge Tour in 2004. It was played at Jolie Ville Golf Resort in Sharm el-Sheikh, Egypt.

== Winners ==
Year	Winner	Score	To par	Margin of victory	Runner-up
2004	(England) Gareth Davies	265	−15	2 strokes	(England) Neil Cheetham
