= Miguel Fernández (golfer) =

Argentine golfer

Personal information
- Full name: Miguel Fernández
- Nationality: Argentina
- Born: 10 April 1962 (age 64) Resistencia, Chaco, Argentina
- Height: 1.80 m (5 ft 11 in)

Career
- Sport: Golf
- Turned professional: 1980
- Former tours: European Tour; Challenge Tour; Tour de las Américas
- Professional wins: 16

Number of wins by tour
- Challenge Tour: 1
- Other: 15

Best results in major championships
- Masters Tournament: DNP
- PGA Championship: DNP
- U.S. Open: DNP
- The Open Championship: CUT: 1991

Achievements and awards
- Argentine Tour Ranking winner: 1987

Miguel Fernández (born 10 April 1962) is an Argentinian professional golfer.

== Career ==
In 1962, Fernández was born in Resistencia, Chaco. He worked as a caddie in Chaco, before turning professional in 1980.

Fernández won the Argentine Tour Order of Merit in 1987. He won the Argentine Open in 1987 and 1988, having previously finished second in 1986. In addition to several victories on the Tour de las Americas, he has also been second in the TLA Players Championship in 2003 and 2006.

Fernández played on the European Tour in 1991, finishing 131st on the Order of Merit with a best finish of tied 7th in the Open de Baleares. The same year, he also played in the British Open at Birkdale. Victory in the Panama Masters in 2004, gave him the chance to return to Europe to play on the Challenge Tour. However, he did not manage to repeat that performance, as he failed to register another top 30 finish on his way to 75th on the money list.

Fernández represented Argentina on one occasion in the World Cup, in 1989 in Spain, and came 4th in the individual tournament.

== Professional wins (16) ==
=== Challenge Tour wins (1) ===
No.	Date	Tournament	Winning score	Margin of victory	Runner-up
1	15 Feb 2004	Summit Panama Masters^{1}	−14 (72-68-68-66=274)	Playoff	(Wales) Mark Pilkington

^{1}Co-sanctioned by the Tour de las Américas

Challenge Tour playoff record (1–0)

No.	Year	Tournament	Opponent	Result
1	2004	Summit Panama Masters	(Wales) Mark Pilkington	Won with birdie on first extra hole

=== Tour de las Américas wins (2) ===
No.	Date	Tournament	Winning score	Margin of victory	Runner-up
1	15 Feb 2004	Summit Panama Masters^{1}	−14 (72-68-68-66=274)	Playoff	(Wales) Mark Pilkington
2	5 Jun 2005	American Express Brazil Classic	−9 (70-67-67-71=275)	Playoff	(Brazil) Alexandre Rocha

^{1}Co-sanctioned by the Challenge Tour

=== Argentine wins (12) ===
- 1987 Argentine Open, Center Open, Abierto del Litoral
- 1988 Argentine Open, Abierto del Litoral
- 1990 North Open
- 1992 Boulonge Four Ball (with Rubén Alvarez)
- 1993 Nautico Escobar Grand Prix
- 1997 Norpatagonico Open
- 2002 Carilo Open
- 2005 Parana Open
- 2006 Chaco Open

=== Other wins (2) ===
- 1993 Prince of Wales Open (Chile)
- 1996 Uruguay Open

== Team appearances ==
- Dunhill Cup (representing Argentina): 1989
- World Cup (representing Argentina): 1989
