= Craig Stefureak =

Canadian professional golfer (born 1977)

Craig Stefureak (born 1997) is a Canadian professional golfer from Caledonia, Ontario, and the winner of the 2025 and 2026 PGA Championship of Canada.

He developed his game at MontHill G&CC before playing collegiate golf at Drury University.

In addition to his competitive career, he serves as the resident golf professional at The Bunker in Ottawa, Ontario, an indoor golf venue featuring TrackMan simulators, where he shares his expertise with golfers of all levels.

In May 2022, Stefureak won the Links Challenge in Kent, England on the 2022 Clutch Pro Tour, a third-tier tour recognised by the European Tour.

== Professional wins (1) ==
=== Clutch Pro Tour wins (1) ===
No.	Date	Tournament	Winning score	Margin of victory	Runners-up
1	24 May 2022	Links Challenge	−8 (70-66=136)	4 strokes	(England) Jamie Dick, (England) Nick McCarthy
