= 2022 PGA EuroPro Tour =

Golf tour season

2022 PGA EuroPro Tour season
- Duration: 27 May 2022 – 21 October 2022
- Number of official events: 16
- Most wins: (England) James Allan (3)
- Order of Merit: (England) James Allan

The 2022 PGA EuroPro Tour was the 20th and final season of the PGA EuroPro Tour, a third-tier tour recognised by the European Tour.

In September, the tour announced that the 2022 season would be the last.

== Schedule ==
The following table lists official events during the 2022 season.

| Date | Tournament | Location | Purse (£) | Winner (Note: The number in brackets after each winner's name is the number of PGA EuroPro Tour events they had won up to and including that tournament. It is rare for someone to accumulate many wins on the PGA EuroPro Tour as success at this level usually leads to promotion to the Challenge Tour.) | OWGR points |
|---|---|---|---|---|---|
| 27 May | Cubefunder Shootout | Buckinghamshire | 49,235 | (England) James Allan (1) | 4 |
| 3 Jun | Ignis Management Championship | Shropshire | 51,195 | (England) Josh Hilleard (1) | 4 |
| 10 Jun | World Snooker & Jessie May Championship | Berkshire | 50,660 | (England) Nick Cunningham (1) | 4 |
| 17 Jun | IFX Payments Championship | Oxfordshire | 50,930 | (England) Jake Ayres (1) | 4 |
| 24 Jun | Bendac Championship | Wiltshire | 49,235 | (England) Ryan Brooks (1) | 4 |
| 1 Jul | PDC Golf Championship | Greater London | 51,710 | (England) Pavan Sagoo (1) | 4 |
| 15 Jul | CPG Classic | Lincolnshire | 52,445 | (Northern Ireland) Dermot McElroy (2) | 4 |
| 22 Jul | Glal.uk Worcestershire Masters | Worcestershire | 49,820 | (England) Brandon Robinson-Thompson (1) | 4 |
| 29 Jul | Q Hotels Collection Championship | Northumberland | 49,530 | (England) Nicholas Poppleton (1) | 4 |
| 5 Aug | Dell Technologies Championship | West Sussex | 49,235 | (England) James Allan (2) | 4 |
| 12 Aug | Lancer Scott Championship | Dyfed | 50,105 | (Wales) Jack Davidson (1) | 0.99 |
| 26 Aug | Northern Ireland Masters | County Down | 50,105 | (England) Sam Broadhurst (1) | 0.99 |
| 9 Sep | Spey Valley Championship | Inverness-shire | 51,455 | (Republic of Ireland) Stuart Grehan (1) | 1.07 |
| 16 Sep | Eagle Orchid Scottish Masters | Fife | 51,195 | (Scotland) Michael Stewart (1) | 1.12 |
| 23 Sep | Wright-Morgan Championship | Somerset | 49,235 | (England) Josh Hilleard (2) | 1.09 |
| 21 Oct | Matchroom Tour Championship | County Fermanagh | 102,460 | (England) James Allan (3) | 0.87 |

== Order of Merit ==
The Order of Merit was titled as the Race to Lough Erne and was based on prize money won during the season, calculated in Pound sterling. The top five players on the Order of Merit earned status to play on the 2023 Challenge Tour.

| Position | Player | Prize money (£) | Status earned |
|---|---|---|---|
| 1 | (England) James Allan | 60,091 | Promoted to Challenge Tour |
| 2 | (Scotland) Michael Stewart | 36,200 | Promoted to Challenge Tour |
| 3 | (Northern Ireland) Dermot McElroy | 35,187 | Promoted to Challenge Tour |
| 4 | (Wales) Jack Davidson | 31,406 | Promoted to Challenge Tour |
| 5 | (England) Josh Hilleard | 29,122 | Promoted to Challenge Tour |
| 6 | (England) Ryan Brooks | 27,121 | |
| 7 | (England) Brandon Robinson-Thompson | 26,487 | |
| 8 | (Republic of Ireland) Stuart Grehan | 24,146 | |
| 9 | (England) Paul Maddy | 21,317 | |
| 10 | (England) Pavan Sagoo | 20,466 | Qualified for Challenge Tour (made cut in Q School) |
