= 2026 Clutch Pro Tour =

Golf tour season

2026 Clutch Pro Tour season
- Duration: 13 May 2026 – 2 October 2026
- Number of official events: 15 (Note: A further five tournaments were postponed.)
- Most wins: (Republic of Ireland) Paul McBride (3)
- Order of Merit: (England) Ben Hutchinson

The 2026 Clutch Pro Tour, titled as the 2026 Rapsodo Series for sponsorship reasons, was the seventh season of the Clutch Pro Tour, a third-tier tour recognised by the European Tour.

== Rapsodo title sponsorship ==
In January, it was announced the tour had signed a title sponsorship agreement with golf technology company Rapsodo, being renamed as the Rapsodo Series.

== Schedule ==
The following table lists official events during the 2026 season.

Date	Tournament	Location	Purse (£)	Winner (Note: The number in brackets after each winner's name is the number of Clutch Pro Tour events they had won up to and including that tournament. It is rare for someone to accumulate many wins on the Clutch Pro Tour as success at this level usually leads to promotion to the Challenge Tour.)	OWGR points
~~27 Mar~~	Ghala	Oman	–	Postponed	–
~~1 Apr~~	Al Mouj	Oman	–	Postponed	–
~~16 Apr~~	Education City	Qatar	–	Postponed	–
16 Apr	Motocaddy Masters	Oxfordshire	50,000	(England) Oliver Farrell (4)	1.89
~~22 Apr~~	Royal Golf Club	Bahrain	–	Postponed	–
~~30 Apr~~	Al Hamra	UAE	–	Postponed	–
30 Apr	Ashburnham Classic	Wales	50,000	(Republic of Ireland) Paul McBride (1)	1.57
7 May	Caddy Comps Trophy	Lincolnshire	50,000	(England) Joe Long (1)	1.44
14 May	Crondon Park Classic	Essex	50,000	(Republic of Ireland) John Murphy (2)	1.21
28 May	Rapsodo Championship	Cornwall	50,000	(Republic of Ireland) Alex Maguire (1)	1.45
5 Jun	Caddy Comps Championship	Turkey	50,000	(Republic of Ireland) Paul McBride (2)	0.93
12 Jun	Motocaddy Championship	Hertfordshire	50,000	(England) Curtis Knipes (4)	1.19
18 Jun	Stromberg Masters	West Midlands	50,000	(Canada) Callum Davison (1)	1.21
9 Jul	Hertfordshire Classic	Hertfordshire	50,000	(England) Habebul Islam (2)	1.64
17 Jul	Abridge Open	Greater London	50,000	(Australia) Declan O'Donovan (1)	1.22
30 Jul	Rapsodo Open	Oxfordshire	50,000	(England) Jon Hopkins (1)	1.26
6 Aug	Mizuno Masters	Wiltshire	50,000	(England) Angus Flanagan (2)	1.18
14 Aug	Mannings Heath Masters	West Sussex	50,000	(England) Giles Evans (7)	1.06
20 Aug	Caddy Club Championship	Essex	50,000	(England) Ben Hutchinson (1)	1.02
2 Oct	Tour Championship	Northumberland	50,000	(Republic of Ireland) Paul McBride (3)	0.72

== Order of Merit ==
The Order of Merit was based on tournament results during the season, calculated using a points-based system. The top three players on the Order of Merit (not otherwise exempt) earned status to play on the 2027 Challenge Tour (HotelPlanner Tour).

Position	Player	Points	Status earned
1	(England) Ben Hutchinson	2,082	Promoted to Challenge Tour
2	(Republic of Ireland) Paul McBride	1,942	Promoted to Challenge Tour
3	(England) Giles Evans	1,578	Promoted to Challenge Tour
4	(England) Jon Hopkins	1,477	
5	(England) Oliver Farrell	1,321	
6	(England) Joe Long	1,260	
7	(Canada) Callum Davison	1,249	
8	(England) Angus Flanagan	1,219	
9	(Republic of Ireland) Alex Maguire	1,181	
10	(England) Curtis Knipes	1,141	

== Tier 2 ==
2026 Clutch Pro Tour Tier 2 season
- Duration: 8 April 2026 – 8 October 2026
- Number of official events: 10
- Most wins: (England) Luke Jenkins (2)
- Order of Merit: (England) Luke Jenkins

The 2026 Clutch Pro Tour Tier 2 was the fourth season of the Clutch Pro Tour Tier 2, the official development tour to the Clutch Pro Tour.

=== Schedule ===
The following table lists official events during the 2026 season.

Date	Tournament	Location	Purse (£)	Winner (Note: The number in brackets after each winner's name is the number of Clutch Pro Tour Tier 2 events they had won up to and including that tournament. It is rare for someone to accumulate many wins on the Clutch Pro Tour Tier 2 as success at this level usually leads to promotion to the Clutch Pro Tour.)
9 Apr	Aldwickbury Park	Hertfordshire	15,000	(England) Ryan Brooks (1)
20 Apr	Ellesborough	Buckinghamshire	11,000	(England) Taylor Paul (1)
20 May	Ogbourne Downs	Wiltshire	15,000	(England) Gary King (3)
4 Jun	Drayton Park	Staffordshire	11,000	(Wales) Jacob Harrington-Wara (1)
3 Jul	Leatherhead Club	Surrey	15,000	(England) Habebul Islam (1)
22 Jul	Whittlebury Park	Northamptonshire	15,000	(England) Luke Jenkins (a) (1)
10 Aug	Mannings Heath	West Sussex	8,000	(England) Callum Rana (a) (1)
3 Sep	Reigate Hill	Surrey	15,000	(England) Ryan Harmer (1)
9 Sep	Mill Green	Hertfordshire	15,000	(England) Jake Burnage (1)
8 Oct	Clandon Regis Tier 2 Tour Championship	Surrey	15,000	(England) Luke Jenkins (a) (2)

=== Order of Merit ===
The Order of Merit was based on tournament results during the season, calculated using a points-based system. The top 25 players on the Order of Merit (not otherwise exempt) earned status to play on the 2027 Clutch Pro Tour.

Position	Player	Points
1	(England) Luke Jenkins (a)	1,690
2	(England) Ryan Harmer	1,434
3	(England) Jamie Dick	1,395
4	(England) Habebul Islam	1,388
5	(England) Gary King	896
