= Mark Pilkington (golfer) =

Welsh golfer

Personal information
- Nationality: Wales
- Born: 17 March 1978 (age 48) Bangor, Gwynedd, Wales
- Height: 6 ft 0 in (1.83 m)

Career
- Sport: Golf
- Turned professional: 1998
- Former tours: European Tour; Challenge Tour
- Professional wins: 2

Number of wins by tour
- Challenge Tour: 1
- Other: 1

Best results in major championships
- Masters Tournament: DNP
- PGA Championship: DNP
- U.S. Open: DNP
- The Open Championship: CUT: 2001, 2006

Achievements and awards
- Challenge Tour Rankings winner: 2006

Mark Pilkington (born 17 March 1978) is a Welsh professional golfer.

== Career ==
Pilkington was born in Bangor, Gwynedd. He enjoyed a successful amateur career, representing Wales at all levels, and highlighted by winning the Welsh Amateur Championship in 1998. He turned professional later that year, immediately after winning a place on the European Tour at final qualifying school.

Pilkington had an unsuccessful rookie season on the European Tour in 1999, and played on the Challenge Tour the following season after failing to regain his card at qualifying school. He followed up a consistent Challenge Tour season with success at qualifying school to return to the top level for 2001. He managed to retain his European Tour card by finishing inside the top 100 on the Order of Merit in both 2001 and 2002, but his form dipped in 2003 and he dropped back down to the second tier for 2004.

After two largely unsuccessful seasons on the Challenge Tour, Pilkington's fortunes were revived in 2006 when he produced consistently good performances to finish the season on top of the Challenge Tour Rankings. After a slow start to the season, he recorded back to back second-place finishes, before rounding off the season with victory in the Kazakhstan Open and another runners-up prize at the Apulia San Domenico Grand Final. By topping the money list, he had regained his card on the European Tour; but in 2007 he finished in 136th place on the Order of Merit to again lose his place on the elite tour.

== Amateur wins ==
- 1996 Peter McEvoy Trophy
- 1998 Welsh Amateur Championship

== Professional wins (2) ==
=== Challenge Tour wins (1) ===
No.	Date	Tournament	Winning score	Margin of victory	Runner-up
1	1 Oct 2006	Kazakhstan Open	−16 (70-66-67-69=272)	2 strokes	(England) Shaun P. Webster

Challenge Tour playoff record (0–1)

No.	Year	Tournament	Opponent	Result
1	2004	Summit Panama Masters	(Argentina) Miguel Fernández	Lost to birdie on first extra hole

=== Other wins (1) ===
- 2019 Welsh PGA Championship

== Results in major championships ==
Tournament	2001	2002	2003	2004	2005	2006
The Open Championship	CUT					CUT

Note: Pilkington only played in The Open Championship.

Did not play

CUT = missed the half-way cut

== Team appearances ==
Amateur

- European Boys' Team Championship (representing Wales): 1995, 1996
- European Amateur Team Championship (representing Wales): 1997
- European Youths' Team Championship (representing Wales): 1998 (winners)

== See also ==
- 2006 Challenge Tour graduates
