= 2014 Challenge Tour graduates =

This is a list of players who graduated from the Challenge Tour in 2014. The top 15 players on the Challenge Tour's money list in 2014 earned their European Tour card for 2015.

	2014 Challenge Tour		2015 European Tour				
Player	Money list rank	Earnings (€)	Starts	Cuts made	Best finish	Money list rank	Earnings (€)
(England) Andrew Johnston	1	190,856	25	14	3	70	480,173
(France) Benjamin Hébert	2	178,266	30	19	T4	65	585,427
(South Korea) An Byeong-hun*	3	150,107	26	20	Win	7	2,417,356
(Germany) Moritz Lampert	4	137,194	29	9	10	151	115,581
(Chile) Mark Tullo	5	129,968	28	8	T10	176	77,642
(England) Sam Hutsby	6	128,984	31	8	T13	190	60,443
(Spain) Jordi García Pinto*	7	112,317	28	10	T24	173	86,586
(England) Jason Palmer*	8	108,056	19	8	T37	191	59,496
(France) Mike Lorenzo-Vera	9	106,796	24	16	T5	78	426,269
(Wales) Oliver Farr*	10	101,476	30	10	T27	156	107,771
(France) Édouard España*	11	95,012	27	14	T2	94	296,256
(Germany) Florian Fritsch	12	92,943	18	10	T7	120	206,346
(France) Jérôme Lando-Casanova*	13	88,785	31	8	T23	172	87,556
(South Africa) Jake Roos*	14	87,431	28	12	T8	143	138,929
(England) Jason Barnes*	15	77,793	27	9	T14	175	78,218

* European Tour rookie in 2015
T = Tied
The player retained his European Tour card for 2016 (finished inside the top 110).
The player did not retain his European Tour card for 2016, but retained conditional status (finished between 111 and 149).
The player did not retain his European Tour card for 2016 (finished outside the top 149).

Lampert earned a direct promotion to the European Tour after his third win of the season in August, while Hébert earned his third win at the season-ending Challenge Tour Grand Final.

== Winners on the European Tour in 2015 ==
No.	Date	Player	Tournament	Winning score	Margin of victory	Runner-up
1	24 May	(South Korea) An Byeong-hun	BMW PGA Championship	−21 (71-64-67-65=267)	6 strokes	(Thailand) Thongchai Jaidee, (Spain) Miguel Ángel Jiménez

== Runners-up on the European Tour in 2015 ==
No.	Date	Player	Tournament	Winner	Winning score	Runner-up score
1	17 May	(France) Édouard España	Open de España	(England) James Morrison	−10 (70-71-68-69=278)	−6 (68-69-76-69=282)

== See also ==
- 2014 European Tour Qualifying School graduates
