= Moritz Lampert =

German professional golfer

Personal information
- Full name: Moritz Horst Lampert
- Nickname: Mo
- Nationality: Germany
- Born: 14 May 1992 (age 34) Schwetzingen, Germany
- Height: 1.81 m (5 ft 11 in)
- Weight: 70 kg (150 lb; 11 st)

Career
- Sport: Golf
- Turned professional: 2012
- Current tour: Challenge Tour
- Former tour: European Tour
- Professional wins: 7

Number of wins by tour
- Challenge Tour: 3
- Other: 4

Moritz Horst Lampert (born 14 May 1992) is a German professional golfer who currently plays on the Challenge Tour. He played on the European Tour in 2013 and 2015 but failed to regain his card on both occasions. He won three events on the 2014 Challenge Tour, reaching a career-high of 146 in the world rankings during that year.

== Early life ==
In 1992, Lampert was born. He had an accomplished junior career winning national boys titles in France and Germany in 2010. As a junior, Lampert played on national and European teams including in the Junior Ryder Cup (twice) and the Jacques Léglise Trophy (twice).

== Amateur career ==
Lampert continued his success at junior level into his senior amateur career winning the Portuguese International Amateur in February 2012. He followed this up with a win in the German International Amateur in July of the same year.

Following this, Lampert went on to represent Germany at the 2012 Eisenhower Trophy in a team with Marcel Schneider and Max Rottluff, Lampert individually finished third and the German team finished in a tie for third behind the United States and Mexico alongside South Korea and France. He also represented Europe at the Bonallack Trophy and St Andrews Trophy.

In 2012, while still as an amateur, Lampert played all three stages and finished T-4 at the European Tour Qualifying School earning him his playing rights on the European Tour for 2013. Immediately following this result, Lampert turned professional in preparation for the 2013 season.

== Professional career ==
Lampert had an unsuccessful first season as a professional making only four cuts in 22 events on the 2013 European Tour, eventually finishing in 184th on Race to Dubai and losing his European Tour playing rights for the 2014 season. He also finished 109th in the 2013 Challenge Tour Order of Merit, to earn a low exemption category for the 2014 Challenge Tour.

For the 2014 season, Lampert played on the Challenge Tour, initially with invitations, and the Germany-based EPD Tour. He recorded his first victory as a professional at the EPD Tour's Open Al Maaden in Morocco. Following this, Lampert recorded his first win on the Challenge tour at the Kärnten Golf Open in May 2014. He followed this up with further wins on the challenge tour at the Fred Olsen Challenge de España in June and the Azerbaijan Golf Challenge Open in August. The third win of the season meant that Lampert earned direct promotion to the European Tour for the remainder of 2014 and all of 2015. Lampert lost his Tour card after the 2015 season. He won an event on the third-tier ProGolf Tour in preparation for the Challenge Tour.

== Amateur wins ==
- 2010 French International Boys Championship (Trophee Carlhian), German Boys Open
- 2012 German International Amateur, Portuguese International Amateur

== Professional wins (7) ==
=== Challenge Tour wins (3) ===
No.	Date	Tournament	Winning score	Margin of victory	Runner-up
1	25 May 2014	Kärnten Golf Open	−19 (69-66-65-65=265)	1 stroke	(South Korea) An Byeong-hun
2	8 Jun 2014	Fred Olsen Challenge de España	−20 (69-66-66-63=264)	2 strokes	(Belgium) Hugues Joannes
3	3 Aug 2014	Azerbaijan Golf Challenge Open	−16 (72-65-69-66=272)	2 strokes	(France) Mike Lorenzo-Vera

=== Pro Golf Tour wins (4) ===
No.	Date	Tournament	Winning score	Margin of victory	Runner(s)-up
1	11 Jul 2012	Bayreuth Open (as an amateur)	−15 (66-65-70=201)	6 strokes	(Germany) Sebastian Heisele
2	21 Feb 2014	Open Al Maaden	−19 (66-66-65=197)	7 strokes	(Netherlands) Robin Kind, (Germany) Max Kramer, (Scotland) David Law
3	8 Feb 2016	Open Ocean	−16 (64-68-65=197)	7 strokes	(Morocco) Younes El Hassani
4	4 Mar 2019	Open Madaef Golfs	−17 (64-68-67=199)	3 strokes	(Netherlands) Max Albertus

== Team appearances ==
Amateur

- Junior Ryder Cup (representing Europe): 2008, 2010
- European Boys' Team Championship (representing Germany): 2009 2010
- Jacques Léglise Trophy (representing the Continent of Europe): 2009, 2010 (winners)
- European Amateur Team Championship (representing Germany): 2011
- Bonallack Trophy (representing Europe): 2012 (winners)
- Eisenhower Trophy (representing Germany): 2012
- St Andrews Trophy (representing the Continent of Europe): 2012 (winners)

== See also ==
- 2012 European Tour Qualifying School graduates
- 2014 Challenge Tour graduates
- List of golfers to achieve a three-win promotion from the Challenge Tour
