= Jason Palmer (golfer) =

English golfer (born 1984)

Personal information
- Nationality: England
- Born: 8 October 1984 (age 42) Melton Mowbray, England
- Height: 6 ft 1 in (1.85 m)
- Weight: 70 kg (154 lb; 11 st 0 lb)

Career
- Sport: Golf
- College: Birmingham University
- Turned professional: 2009
- Former tours: European Tour; Challenge Tour; Alps Tour
- Professional wins: 5

Number of wins by tour
- Challenge Tour: 1
- Other: 4

Best results in major championships
- Masters Tournament: DNP
- PGA Championship: DNP
- U.S. Open: CUT: 2015
- The Open Championship: DNP

Achievements and awards
- Alps Tour Order of Merit winner: 2013

Jason Palmer (born 8 October 1984) is an English professional golfer who previously played on the European Tour. Palmer retired through injury and now caddies on the European Tour.

== Amateur career ==
As an amateur whilst at Birmingham University, Palmer won the 2006 Italian Amateur Open. In 2008 he followed this up with a win in the Midlands Open.

His biggest win as an amateur came in 2009 at the South of England Open Amateur Championship at Walton Heath Golf Club.

== Professional career ==
Palmer turned professional in 2009 and initially played on the Alps Tour, his first win on the tour came at the 2010 Uniqa Financelife Open.

Following the 2010 season, Palmer joined the Challenge Tour and played a mixed schedule of Challenge Tour and Alps Tour events. His second win as a professional came in 2013 at the Friuli Venezia Giulia Open, this was followed up with two further Alps Tour wins in 2013 at the Cervino Open and the Citadelle Trophy International. In winning the Citadelle Trophy Palmer set a new tour record for the largest winning margin with a victory of 11 strokes. With these wins, Palmer won the Alps Tour Order of Merit for 2013 securing his full playing rights on the Challenge Tour for 2014.

In October 2014, Palmer achieved his first win on the Challenge Tour at the Foshan Open in China.

Palmer is also known for his unusual one-handed chipping and bunker play technique.

In January 2018, Palmer announced his retirement from professional golf via Twitter. He cited an ongoing wrist injury as the cause to the end of his playing career.

== Other ventures ==
In 2018, Palmer was a contestant on the Channel 4 gameshow Countdown.

== Amateur wins ==
- 2006 Italian Amateur Open
- 2008 Midland Open Amateur Championship
- 2010 South of England Open Amateur Championship

== Professional wins (5) ==
=== Challenge Tour wins (1) ===
No.	Date	Tournament	Winning score	Margin of victory	Runner-up
1	26 Oct 2014	Foshan Open	−16 (65-69-69-69=272)	1 stroke	(England) Ben Evans

=== Alps Tour wins (4) ===
No.	Date	Tournament	Winning score	Margin of victory	Runner(s)-up
1	7 Aug 2010	Uniqa FinanceLife Open	−11 (68-65=133)	4 strokes	(England) Daniel Coughlan
2	1 Jun 2013	Friuli Venezia Giulia Open Grado	−15 (70-65-66=201)	2 strokes	(Austria) Lukas Nemecz, (England) Ben Evans, (France) Raphaël Marguery
3	31 Aug 2013	Cervino Open	−12 (64-63-65=192)	2 strokes	(England) Michael Bush
4	15 Sep 2013	Citadelle Trophy International	−19 (67-67-68-67=269)	11 strokes	(France) Édouard España

== See also ==
- 2014 Challenge Tour graduates
