= Daniel Gaunt (golfer) =

Australian professional golfer (born 1978)

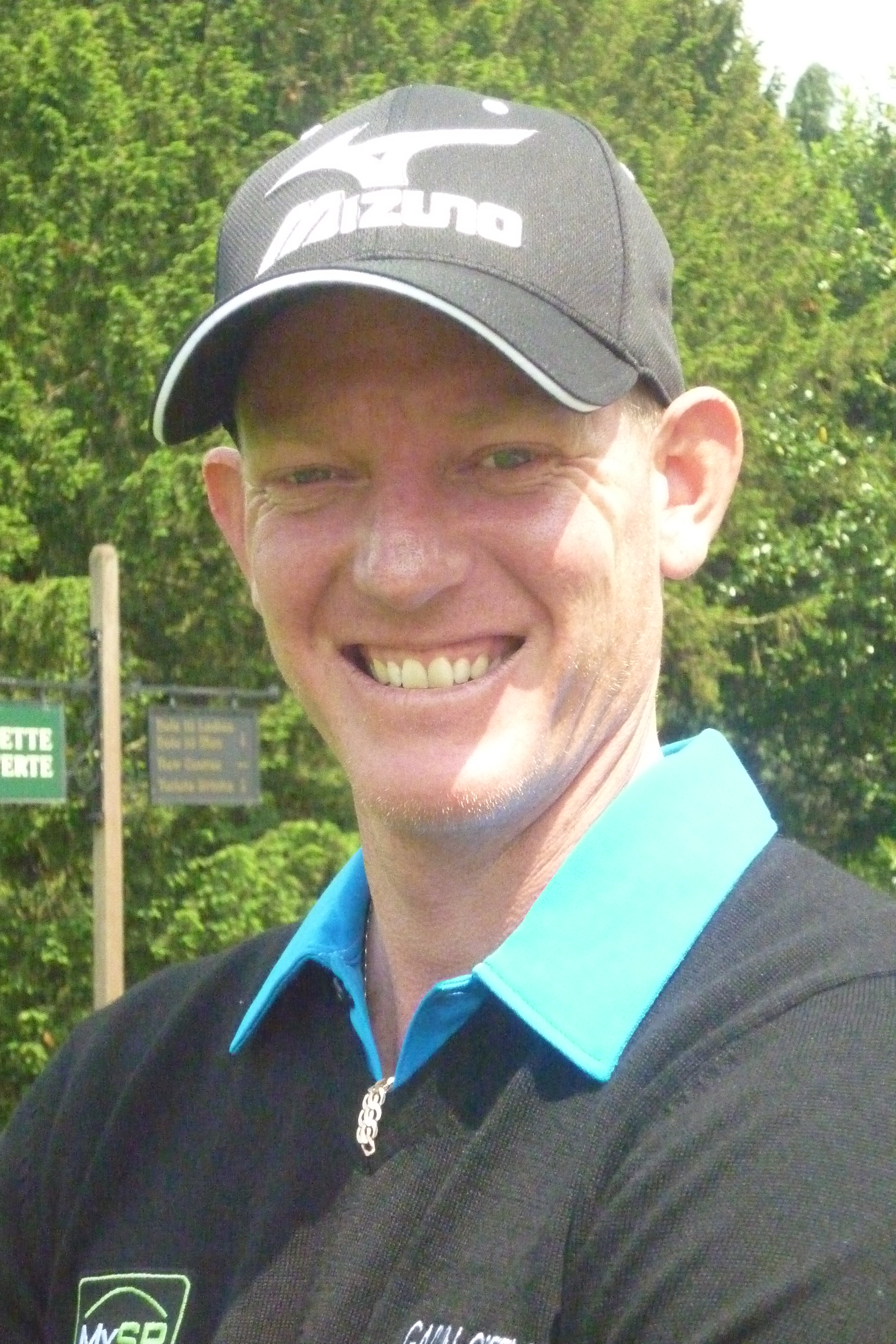

Personal information
- Full name: Daniel Stephen Gaunt
- Nationality: Australia; England
- Born: 14 November 1978 (age 47) Lancefield, Victoria, Australia
- Height: 1.80 m (5 ft 11 in)
- Spouse: Caroline Gaunt
- Children: 4

Career
- Sport: Golf
- Turned professional: 1999
- Former tours: European Tour; Challenge Tour; Sunshine Tour; PGA EuroPro Tour; Clutch Pro Tour; MENA Tour
- Professional wins: 8

Number of wins by tour
- Challenge Tour: 2
- Other: 6

Best results in major championships
- Masters Tournament: DNP
- PGA Championship: DNP
- U.S. Open: DNP
- The Open Championship: 73rd: 2009

Achievements and awards
- PGA EuroPro Tour Order of Merit winner: 2010
- Clutch Pro Tour Order of Merit winner: 2021

Daniel Stephen Gaunt (born 14 November 1978) is an Australian professional golfer.

== Early life and amateur career ==
In 1978, Gaunt was born in Lancefield, Victoria, Australia, a suburb of Melbourne. His brother Chris is also a professional golfer.

In 1997, he tied with Terry Pilkadaris for the Australian Medal.

== Professional career ==
In 1999, Gaunt turned professional. In 2003, he qualified for the European Tour via qualifying school at the end of 2003. He was unable to retain his card, and has played predominantly on lower level tours since 2005. He has won several events on those tours including four victories on the third-tier PGA EuroPro Tour.

In July 2010, Gaunt won the English Challenge on Europe's second tier Challenge Tour which gave him a year's exemption on that tour. He ended the season in 7th place on the Challenge Tour Rankings to earn his card on the top level European Tour for 2011.

== Personal life ==
Gaunt lives in New Malden, England, with his wife, Caroline, and four children.

== Amateur wins ==
- 1997 Australian Medal (tied with Terry Pilkadaris)

== Professional wins (8) ==
=== Challenge Tour wins (2) ===
No.	Date	Tournament	Winning score	Margin of victory	Runner(s)-up
1	25 Jul 2010	English Challenge	−17 (64-69-70-68=271)	1 stroke	(England) Tommy Fleetwood (a), (Scotland) Craig Lee
2	27 May 2013	Telenet Trophy	−11 (69-66-69-69=273)	Playoff	(Netherlands) Wil Besseling

Challenge Tour playoff record (1–0)

No.	Year	Tournament	Opponent	Result
1	2013	Telenet Trophy	(Netherlands) Wil Besseling	Won with birdie on first extra hole

=== PGA EuroPro Tour wins (4) ===
No.	Date	Tournament	Winning score	Margin of victory	Runner(s)-up
1	5 Aug 2005	Peugeot International	−8 (69-67-69=205)	1 stroke	(England) Graeme Clark, (England) Mark Smith
2	23 Jun 2006	Kronenbourg Classic	−8 (73-66-69=208)	2 strokes	(Scotland) Eric Ramsay
3	22 Aug 2008	Partypoker.com Players Championship	−9 (71-68-68=207)	Playoff	(England) James Busby, (Wales) Mark Laskey
4	29 Apr 2010	Motocaddy Masters	−10 (69-68-69=206)	5 strokes	(England) Andrew Johnston, (England) Dale Marmion

=== MENA Tour wins (1) ===
No.	Date	Tournament	Winning score	Margin of victory	Runners-up
1	20 Feb 2019	Troon Series – Al Zorah Open	−9 (68-66-73=207)	Playoff	(England) Benjamin David, (South Africa) Mathiam Keyser

=== Jamega Pro Golf Tour wins (1) ===
No.	Date	Tournament	Winning score	Margin of victory	Runners-up
1	10 Sep 2019	Donnington Grove Trophy	−10 (65-69=134)	3 strokes	(England) Ben Amor, (England) Jack Charman, (England) Steve Surry

== Results in major championships ==
Tournament	2009
The Open Championship	73

Note: Gaunt only played in The Open Championship.

== Team appearances ==
Amateur

- Australian Men's Interstate Teams Matches (representing Victoria): 1996, 1997, 1998

== See also ==
- 2010 Challenge Tour graduates
- 2012 European Tour Qualifying School graduates
