= Craig Lee =

Scottish professional golfer

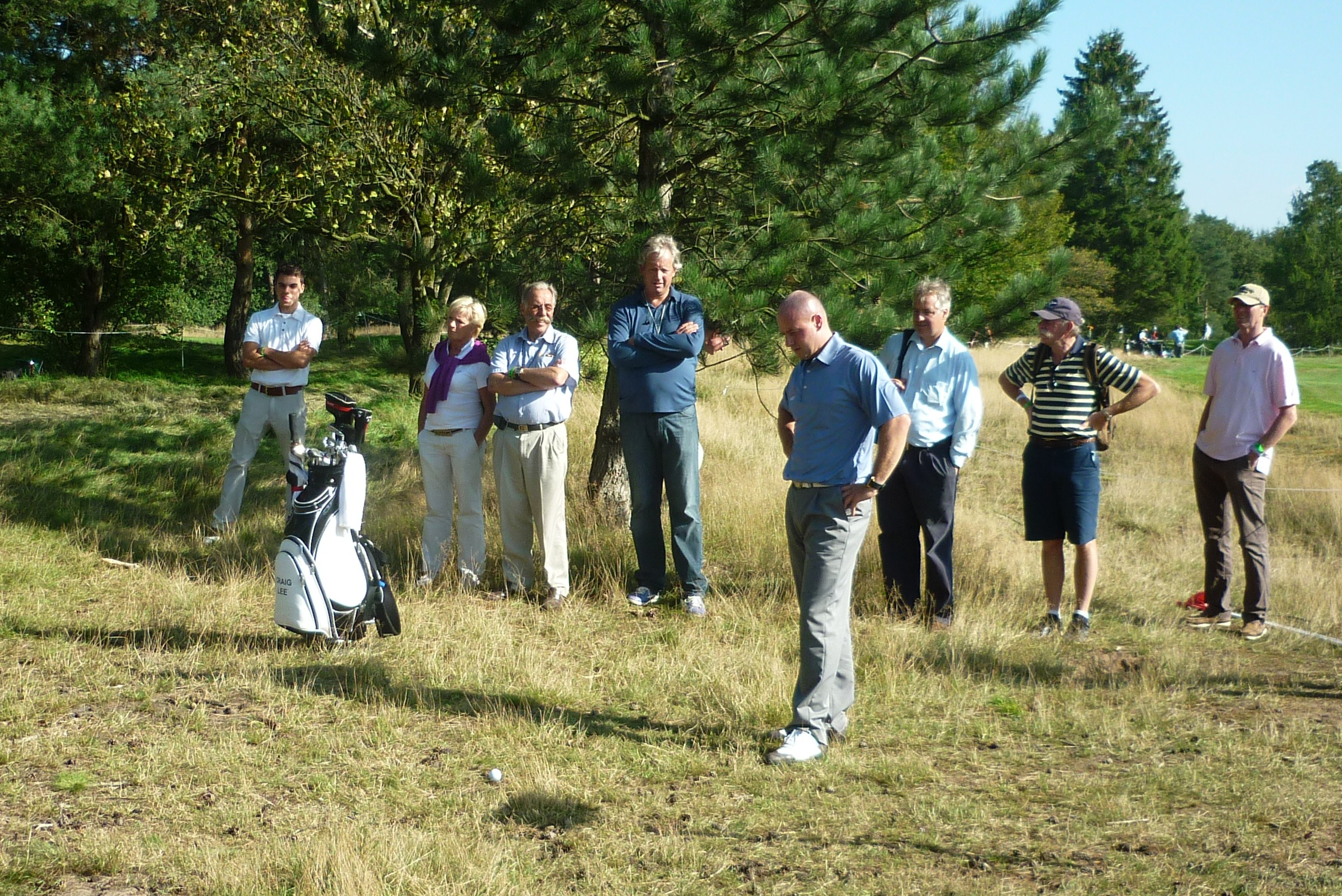
- Lee at the 2012 KLM Open

Personal information
- Full name: Craig Andrew Lee
- Nationality: Scotland
- Born: 9 May 1977 (age 49) Stirling, Scotland
- Height: 5 ft 11 in (1.80 m)
- Weight: 182 lb (83 kg; 13.0 st)

Career
- Sport: Golf
- Turned professional: 1996
- Current tour: Tartan Pro Tour
- Former tours: European Tour; Challenge Tour; PGA EuroPro Tour; EPD Tour
- Professional wins: 9

Craig Andrew Lee (born 9 May 1977) is a Scottish professional golfer who played on the European Tour. He lost to Thomas Bjørn in a playoff for the 2013 Omega European Masters.

== Career ==
Lee had a successful amateur career in his home country, culminating with a win in the national Boys Stroke Play event in 1995. He turned professional the following year, but struggled to replicate his success, spending many years working as a club professional in the Stirling area.

In 2007, despite not having a sponsor, Lee advanced through all three stages of qualifying school to gain his European Tour card for the first time. However, a poor debut season left Lee without a tour to play on at the start of 2009. He battled back to the second tier Challenge Tour in 2010 courtesy of a runner-up finish in the English Challenge, and his good form on that tour continued through 2011: another second-place finish at the Saint-Omer Open, a tournament co-sanctioned by the European Tour, helped Lee to 14th place in the season-end standings and a return to the European Tour.

From 2012 Lee played primarily on the European Tour before retiring as a touring professional at the end of 2017. He never won on the tour, losing to Thomas Bjørn in a playoff for the 2013 Omega European Masters at Crans-sur-Sierre, when Bjørn holed at 12-foot birdie putt at the first extra hole. Lee had led after at the start of the final round after a third round 61. Lee tied for third place in the 2015 Tshwane Open in South Africa. His best season was 2013 when he finished 59th in the Order of Merit. Lee was a captain's pick for the 2019 PGA Cup team.

== Amateur wins ==
- 1995 Scottish Boys Stroke Play Championship

== Professional wins (9) ==
=== PGA EuroPro Tour wins (1) ===
No.	Date	Tournament	Winning score	Margin of victory	Runner-up
1	18 Jun 2010	Dunlop Masters	−18 (68-63-61=192)	6 strokes	(England) Steve Uzzell

=== EPD Tour wins (2) ===
No.	Date	Tournament	Winning score	Margin of victory	Runner(s)-up
1	29 Jan 2009	Sueno Pines Classic	−4 (72-69-71=212)	2 strokes	(England) Paul Hendriksen
2	2 Feb 2009	Sueno Dunes Classic	−8 (71-64-64=199)	1 stroke	(Netherlands) Richard Kind, (Austria) Christoph Pfau

=== Tartan Pro Tour wins (1) ===
No.	Date	Tournament	Winning score	Margin of victory	Runner-up
1	3 May 2023	Barassie Links Classic	−14 (68-67-67=202)	Playoff	(Scotland) Paul O'Hara

=== Other wins (5) ===
- 2000 Scottish Assistants' Championship
- 2009 Northern Open
- 2011 American Golf Holiday Scottsdale Classic Pro-Am
- 2022 Mizuno Next Gen Pro-Am (shared with Robbie Busher)
- 2025 Northern Open

== Playoff record ==
European Tour playoff record (0–1)

No.	Year	Tournament	Opponent	Result
1	2013	Omega European Masters	(Denmark) Thomas Bjørn	Lost to birdie on first extra hole

== Team appearances ==
Amateur

- Jacques Léglise Trophy (representing Great Britain & Ireland): 1995 (winners)

Professional

- PGA Cup (representing Great Britain and Ireland): 2019

== See also ==
- 2007 European Tour Qualifying School graduates
- 2011 Challenge Tour graduates
