= Clutch Pro Tour =

Professional golf tour

- Current season, competition or edition: 2026 Clutch Pro Tour
- Formerly: Mizuno Next Gen Series
- Sport: Golf
- Founded: 2019
- Founder: Tom Hayward
- First season: 2020
- CEO: Tom Hayward
- Countries: Based in England (Note: Schedules have also included events in Bahrain, Morocco, Northern Ireland, Oman, Qatar, Turkey, the United Arab Emirates and Wales.)
- Most titles: Tournament wins: (England) Giles Evans (7)
- Related competitions: Tartan Pro Tour
- Website: https://www.clutchprotour.co.uk/

The Clutch Pro Tour is a series of developmental golf tournaments played predominantly in England. The tour is open to both male and female professionals.

== History ==
The tour was created in 2019 by Tom Hayward, a former professional golfer, to give lower level professionals more playing opportunities as well as helping progress their careers. The inaugural season took place after the COVID-19 pandemic lockdown in June 2020.

In May 2022, the tour undertook a sponsorship agreement with Mizuno Golf, being renamed as the Mizuno Next Gen Series.

In December 2022, it was announced that the Clutch Pro Tour and the Tartan Pro Tour would become official feeder tours to the Challenge Tour in place of the now-defunct PGA EuroPro Tour. The Clutch Pro Tour would offer Challenge Tour status to the top two players on the Order of Merit. In December 2023, it was confirmed that an additional player (three in total) from the Order of Merit would be awarded Challenge Tour status for the following season. Each event is a 54-hole tournament with a 36-hole cut for the 50 plus ties. Beginning in 2025, the tour also has a season-ending no-cut championship and a qualifying tournament.

In addition to the top three non-exempt players graduating to the Challenge Tour, the top four players on the Order of Merit earn entry into the second stage of European Tour Qualifying School. Players ranked 4th-7th also receive seven exemptions into Challenge Tour events.

In April 2024, it was announced that the tour would be included into the Official World Golf Ranking with immediate effect, having undergone a 17-month application process.

== Order of Merit winners ==
Year	Winner	Points
2026	(England) Ben Hutchinson	2,082
2025	(England) Callum Farr	2,526
2024	(England) Callan Barrow	1,970
2023	(England) George Bloor	4,129
2022	(England) Giles Evans	4,098
2021	(Australia) Daniel Gaunt	3,063
2020	(England) Mitch Waite	5,228

== Tier 2 ==
In October 2022, the tour announced a new second-tier to their ecosystem. Tier 2 was added to increase playing opportunities and prize money for players, with the top 15 on the Tier 2 Order of Merit earning status to play on the main Clutch Pro Tour for the following season.

For the 2026 season, the number of players promoted to Tier 1 increased to 25, with the Order of Merit winner receiving three Challenge Tour invites.

=== Tier 2 Order of Merit winners ===
Year	Winner	Points
2026	(England) Luke Jenkins (a)	1,690
2025	(England) Habebul Islam	1,313
2024	(Republic of Ireland) Jack Madden	1,655
2023	(England) Conor White	3,567
