= Grégory Bourdy =

French professional golfer

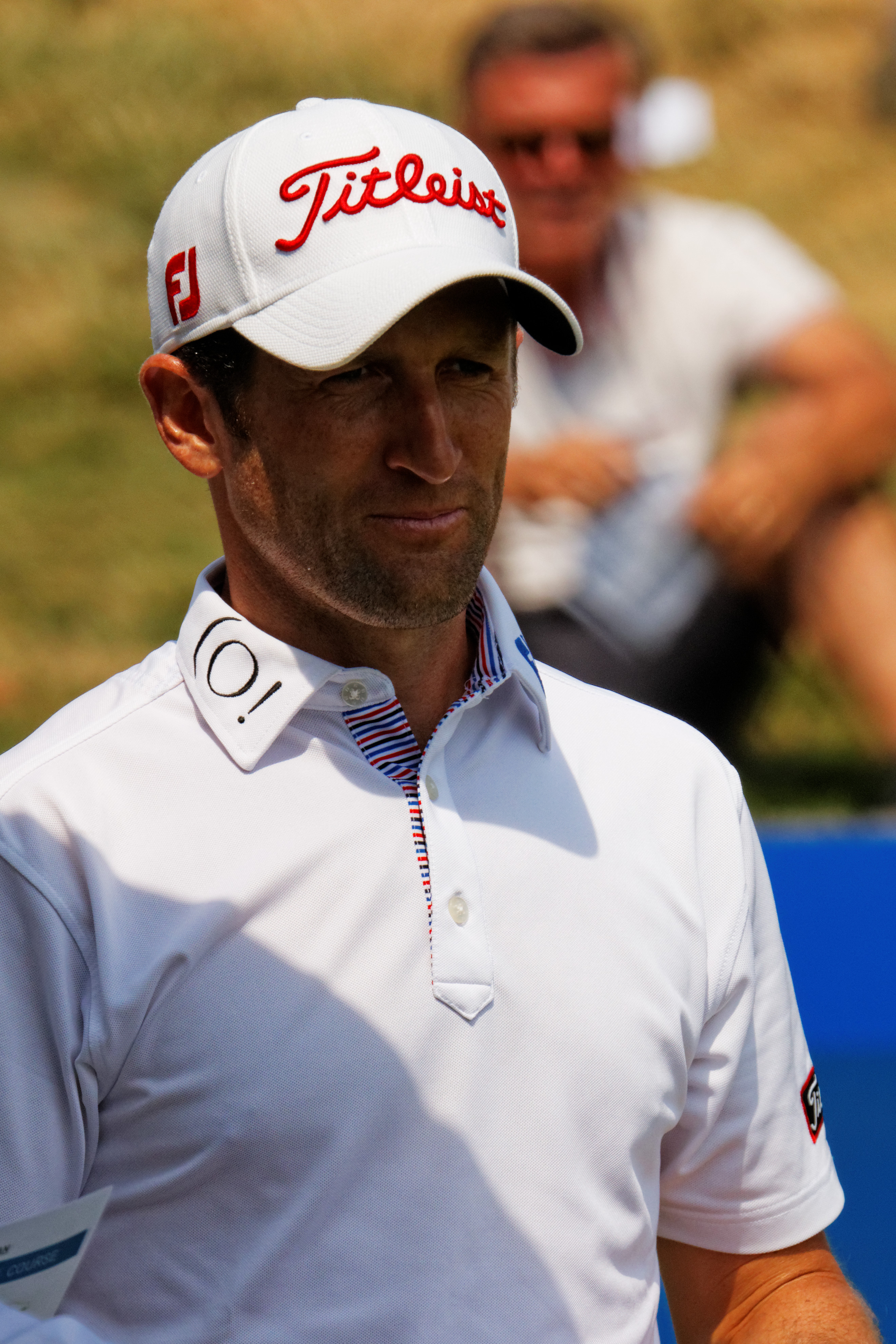
- Bourdy at the 2011 KLM Open

Personal information
- Nationality: France
- Born: 25 April 1982 (age 44) Bordeaux, France
- Height: 1.80 m (5 ft 11 in)
- Weight: 70 kg (154 lb; 11 st 0 lb)

Career
- Sport: Golf
- Turned professional: 2003
- Current tour: European Tour
- Former tours: Sunshine Tour; Alps Tour
- Professional wins: 10
- Highest ranking: 75 (12 June 2011)

Number of wins by tour
- European Tour: 4
- Asian Tour: 1
- Sunshine Tour: 1
- Other: 5

Best results in major championships
- Masters Tournament: DNP
- PGA Championship: T18: 2016
- U.S. Open: T18: 2016
- The Open Championship: T39: 2008
Medal record
Mediterranean Games
Gold medal – first place	2001 Tunis	Men's team

Grégory Bourdy (born 25 April 1982) is a French professional golfer who competes on the European Tour.

== Career ==
Bourdy was born in Bordeaux. He turned professional in 2003. His cousin Nicolas Beaufils is also a professional golfer, who has played on the Challenge Tour.

Bourdy has played on the European Tour full-time since 2005, having previously competed on the second-tier Challenge Tour. Bourdy won his first European Tour event on 28 October 2007 at the Mallorca Classic. That win helped him to finish 39th on the European Tour's Order of Merit list, the first time he had broken the top 100. He has been the highest ranked French golfer on the Official World Golf Rankings.

Bourdy also has three victories on the Alps Tour, one of Europe's third-tier development tours, between 2003 and 2005, and won the South African PGA Championship on the Sunshine Tour in 2006. Bourdy was also a member of the France team that finished in 2nd place at the 2002 Eisenhower Trophy.

After his first European Tour win at the 2007 Mallorca Classic, Bourdy collected another victory at the Estoril Open de Portugal in 2008.

In November 2009, Bourdy held off the challenge of Rory McIlroy to win the UBS Hong Kong Open by two strokes.

At the Lyoness Open in June 2015, Bourdy held a two-stroke advantage going into the final round, having led from day one. However, in the final round he shot a six-over-par 78 that included five bogeys and a double bogey to finish in a tie for sixth.

In 2016, Bourdy finished T18 at both the U.S. Open and the PGA Championship – his best finishes at major championships to date – and shared 21st place at the Olympic Games in Brazil.

== Amateur wins ==
- 2002 Scottish Youths Amateur Open Championship

== Professional wins (10) ==
=== European Tour wins (4) ===
No.	Date	Tournament	Winning score	Margin of victory	Runner(s)-up
1	28 Oct 2007	Mallorca Classic	−12 (69-68-64-67=268)	2 strokes	(England) Sam Little
2	6 Apr 2008	Estoril Open de Portugal	−18 (63-65-68-70=266)	Playoff	(Scotland) Alastair Forsyth, (England) David Howell
3	15 Nov 2009	UBS Hong Kong Open^{1}	−19 (64-67-63-67=261)	2 strokes	(Northern Ireland) Rory McIlroy
4	1 Sep 2013	ISPS Handa Wales Open	−8 (67-72-70-67=276)	2 strokes	(United States) Peter Uihlein

^{1}Co-sanctioned by the Asian Tour

European Tour playoff record (1–0)

No.	Year	Tournament	Opponents	Result
1	2008	Estoril Open de Portugal	(Scotland) Alastair Forsyth, (England) David Howell	Won with birdie on third extra hole Forsyth eliminated by par on second hole

=== Sunshine Tour wins (1) ===
No.	Date	Tournament	Winning score	Margin of victory	Runner-up
1	19 Feb 2006	Telkom PGA Championship	−21 (66-66-66-69=267)	6 strokes	(South Africa) Thomas Aiken

=== Alps Tour wins (3) ===
No.	Date	Tournament	Winning score	Margin of victory	Runners-up
1	19 Apr 2003	Open de la Commission Professionnelle	−15 (69-67-69-68=273)	2 strokes	(France) Alexandre Balicki, (France) Philippe Lima
2	1 Jun 2003	Open de Bordeaux	−18 (67-68-66-69=270)	1 stroke	(France) Ilya Goroneskoul, (France) Sarel Son-Houi
3	17 Sep 2005	Open International Stade Français Paris	−8 (71-65-72-72=280)	Playoff	(France) Adrien Mörk, (France) Sarel Son-Houi

=== French Tour wins (2) ===
No.	Date	Tournament	Winning score	Margin of victory	Runner-up
1	9 Apr 2011	Grand Prix Schweppes	−15 (69-69-66-65=269)	1 stroke	(France) Édouard Dubois
2	13 Apr 2013	Grand Prix Schweppes (2)	−9 (69-65-72-69=275)	2 strokes	(France) Grégory Havret

== Results in major championships ==
Tournament	2007	2008	2009	2010	2011	2012	2013	2014	2015	2016	2017
Masters Tournament											
U.S. Open						CUT				T18	CUT
The Open Championship	T53	T39			T48		T64	T47			
PGA Championship				T58	CUT					T18	

Did not play

CUT = missed the halfway cut
"T" indicates a tie for a place.

== Results in World Golf Championships ==
Results not in chronological order before 2015.

Tournament	2006	2007	2008	2009	2010	2011	2012	2013	2014	2015	2016
Championship	T59										
Match Play											
Invitational					T69						
Champions					T39			T21			T52

Did not play

"T" = Tied
Note that the HSBC Champions did not become a WGC event until 2009.

== Team appearances ==
Amateur

- European Boys' Team Championship (representing France): 1999
- European Youths' Team Championship (representing France): 2002
- Eisenhower Trophy (representing France): 2002

Professional

- World Cup (representing France): 2008, 2011, 2013
- Seve Trophy (representing Continental Europe): 2013 (winners)
