= Marco Crespi =

Italian professional golfer (born 1978)

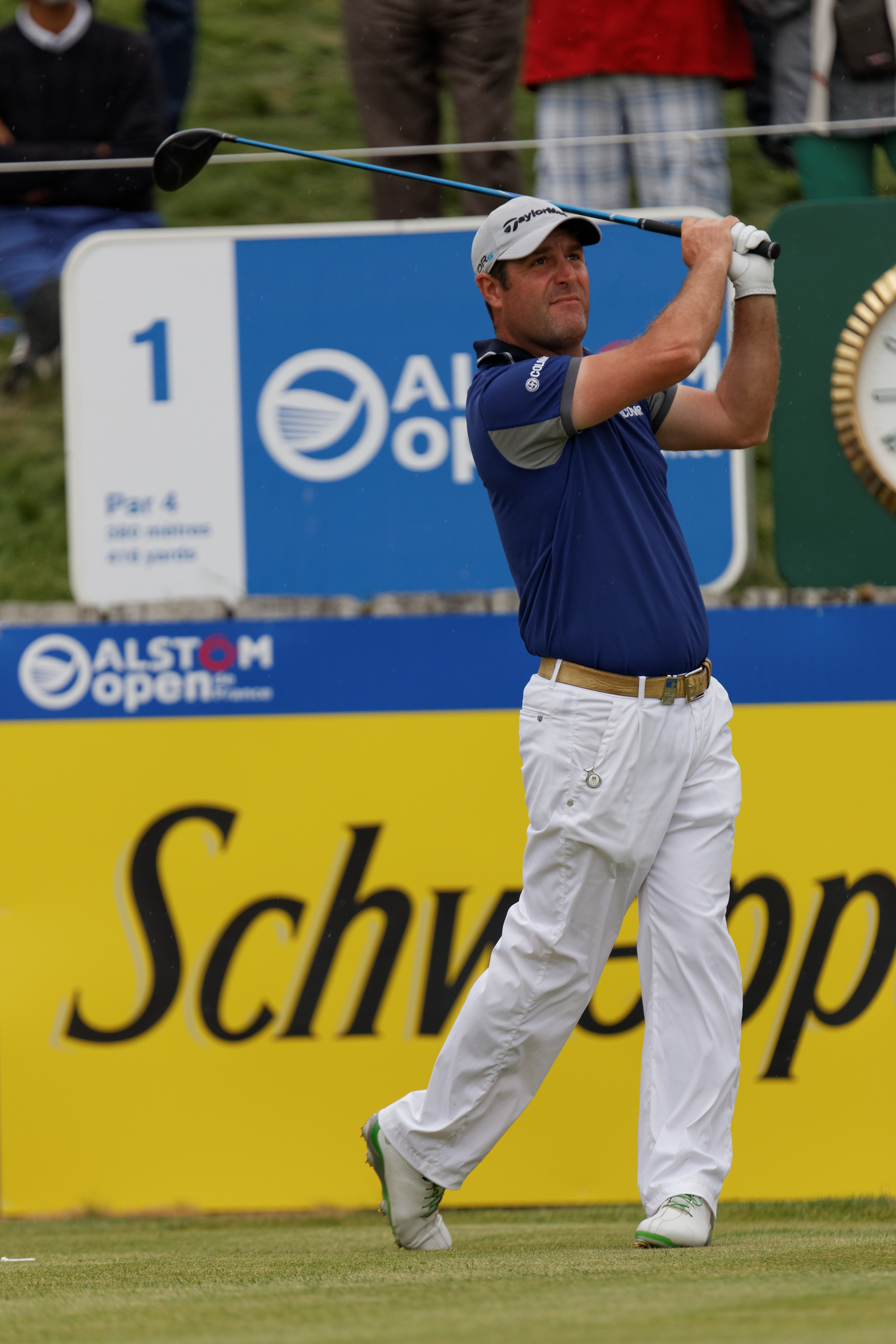

Personal information
- Nationality: Italy
- Born: 5 November 1978 (age 47) Monza, Italy
- Height: 1.78 m (5 ft 10 in)
- Weight: 80 kg (176 lb; 12 st 8 lb)

Career
- Sport: Golf
- Turned professional: 2002
- Current tour: Challenge Tour
- Former tour: European Tour
- Professional wins: 11

Number of wins by tour
- European Tour: 1
- Challenge Tour: 3
- Other: 8

Marco Crespi (born 5 November 1978) is an Italian professional golfer.

== Career ==
Crespi was born in Monza, Italy. He turned professional in 2002.

Crespi played on the Challenge Tour in 2006–2009 and 2012–2013. He was invited to the 2012 Telenet Trophy which he won to earn full membership of the Challenge Tour. He subsequently won the 2013 Mugello Tuscany Open.

Crespi earned his 2014 European Tour card via qualifying school on his 11th attempt. He also earned his first European Tour win at the NH Collection Open and is the oldest rookie to win in European Tour history. By 2016, Crespi lost his European Tour card and was playing on the third tier Alps Tour, where he won in 2017.

== Professional wins (11) ==
=== European Tour wins (1) ===
No.	Date	Tournament	Winning score	Margin of victory	Runners-up
1	6 Apr 2014	NH Collection Open^{1}	−10 (70-73-66-69=278)	2 strokes	(Spain) Jordi García Pinto, (Scotland) Richie Ramsay

^{1}Dual-ranking event with the Challenge Tour

=== Challenge Tour wins (3) ===
No.	Date	Tournament	Winning score	Margin of victory	Runner(s)-up
1	27 May 2012	Telenet Trophy	−14 (68-65-70-67=270)	3 strokes	(Spain) Carlos Aguilar
2	21 Jul 2013	Mugello Tuscany Open	−17 (72-64-66-65=267)	1 stroke	(Portugal) José-Filipe Lima, (Norway) Knut Børsheim
3	6 Apr 2014	NH Collection Open^{1}	−10 (70-73-66-69=278)	2 strokes	(Spain) Jordi García Pinto, (Scotland) Richie Ramsay

^{1}Dual-ranking event with the European Tour

=== Alps Tour wins (6) ===
No.	Date	Tournament	Winning score	Margin of victory	Runner(s)-up
1	4 Oct 2008	Open La Margherita	−8 (70-75-63=208)	2 strokes	(Italy) Emanuele Lattanzi, (Switzerland) Nicolas Sulzer
2	17 May 2009	Slovenian Golf Open	−18 (65-67-63=195)	10 strokes	(England) Sam Robinson
3	10 Oct 2009	Feudo d'Asti Golf Open	−20 (67-62-61=190)	Playoff	(Italy) Andrea Perrino
4	22 Jul 2011	Le Fonti Open	−12 (68-69-67=204)	1 stroke	(France) Clément Gallois
5	14 Aug 2011	Flory Van Donck Trophy	−18 (68-68-68-66=270)	1 stroke	(England) Chris Paisley
6	16 Jun 2017	Open La Pinetina – Memorial Giorgio Bordoni	−14 (64-67-65=196)	Playoff	(Netherlands) Lars van Meijel, (England) James Sharp

=== Other wins (2) ===
- 2005 Italian PGA Championship
- 2007 Italian PGA Championship

== See also ==
- 2013 European Tour Qualifying School graduates
