= Allianz Golf Open du Grand Toulouse =

Golf tournament in France

Allianz Golf Open Toulouse Metropole
Tournament information
- Location: Seilh, France
- Established: 2000
- Course: Golf de Toulouse-Seilh
- Par: 71
- Length: 6,924 yards (6,331 m)
- Tours: Challenge Tour; Alps Tour
- Format: Stroke play
- Prize fund: €160,000
- Month played: September
- Final year: 2012

Tournament record score
- Aggregate: 267 John Parry (2009)
- To par: −21 as above

Final champion
- (France) Julien Brun
- Location in France Location in Occitanie

The Allianz Golf Open Toulouse Metropole was an annual golf tournament held near Toulouse, France. It was founded in 2000 and became part of the Alps Tour schedule the following year. From 2003 to 2012, it was an event on the Challenge Tour.

== Winners ==
Year	Tour (Note: ALP − Alps Tour; CHA − Challenge Tour.)	Winner	Score	To par	Margin of victory	Runner-up	Venue
Allianz Golf Open Toulouse Metropole
2012	CHA	(France) Julien Brun (a)	271	−13	1 stroke	(Italy) Matteo Delpodio	Golf de Toulouse-Seilh
Allianz Golf Open Grand Toulouse
2011	CHA	(England) Sam Little	268	−16	1 stroke	(Republic of Ireland) Simon Thornton	Golf de Toulouse-Seilh
Allianz Golf Open du Grand Toulouse
2010	CHA	(Austria) Bernd Wiesberger	275	−9	4 strokes	(France) Charles-Édouard Russo	Golf de Toulouse-Seilh
Allianz Golf Open Grand Toulouse
2009	CHA	(England) John Parry	267	−21	2 strokes	(Portugal) José-Filipe Lima	Golf de Toulouse-Seilh
AGF-Allianz Golf Open Grand Toulouse
2008	CHA	(Scotland) Richie Ramsay	269	−19	2 strokes	(England) Richard McEvoy	Golf de Toulouse-Seilh
A.G.F. Allianz Golf Open de Toulouse
2007	CHA	(Netherlands) Joost Luiten	271	−17	1 stroke	(Belgium) Nicolas Vanhootegem	Golf de Toulouse-Seilh
Golf Open International de Toulouse
2006	CHA	(France) Julien Forêt	274	−14	Playoff	(England) Shaun P. Webster	Golf de Toulouse-Seilh
Open de Toulouse
2005	CHA	(United States) Brad Sutterfield	271	−17	2 strokes	(England) David Dixon (Sweden) Steven Jeppesen (Norway) Jan-Are Larsen (Argentina) Andrés Romero	Golf de Toulouse-Palmola
2004	CHA	(Zimbabwe) Marc Cayeux	276	−12	Playoff	(Scotland) David Drysdale	Golf de Toulouse-Palmola
2003	CHA	(Scotland) Scott Drummond	269	−19	Playoff	(France) Alexandre Balicki (Wales) Mark Mouland	Golf de Toulouse-Palmola
2002	ALP	(France) Julien van Hauwe	270	−18	2 strokes	(France) Nicolas Marin	Golf de Toulouse-Palmola
2001	ALP	(France) Roger Sabarros	273	−15	5 strokes	(France) Julien van Hauwe	Golf de Toulouse-Palmola
2000		(France) Lionel Alexandre		−19			
