= Memorial Olivier Barras =

Tournament information
- Location: Crans-Montana, Switzerland
- Established: 1965
- Course: Crans-sur-Sierre Golf Club
- Par: 71
- Length: 6,824 yards (6,240 m)
- Tours: Challenge Tour; Alps Tour
- Format: Stroke play
- Prize fund: CHF 25,000
- Month played: June

Current champion
- (Switzerland) Fridolin Michel

Location map
- Location in Switzerland

The Mémorial Olivier Barras is a professional golf tournament that is held annually at Crans-sur-Sierre Golf Club in Crans-Montana, Valais, Switzerland. It was founded in 1965 in memory of Olivier Barras, a nine-time Swiss champion golfer who died in a car crash in June 1964, at Monza racing on the track.

== History ==
The tournament featured on the Challenge Tour between 1990 and 2000, usually as an unofficial money event, and later on the Alps Tour. Founded in 1965, the 2020 tournament was the 56th installment.

The tournament is named in honor of Swiss amateur golfer Olivier Barras (1932–1964), son of Crans-sur-Sierre GC president Antoine Barras, who died in a Monza car crash.

For several years, the best amateur and the best professional have earned qualification for the Omega European Masters (formerly the Swiss Open), held at the same course since 1939.

== Winners ==
| Year | Tour (Note: ALP − Alps Tour; CHA − Challenge Tour.) | Winner | Score | To par | Margin of victory | Runner(s)-up | Ref. |
|---|---|---|---|---|---|---|---|
| 2026 | | (Switzerland) Fridolin Michel (a) | 204 | −9 | Playoff | (Switzerland) Alexander Brand (a) | |
| 2025 | | (Germany) Frederik Eisenbeis (a) | 205 | −8 | Playoff | (Italy) Carlo Roman (a) | |
| 2024 | | (Hong Kong) Kho Taichi | 203 | −10 | 5 strokes | (Germany) Sven Cremer (Switzerland) Filippo Serra (a) (Switzerland) Miles Wennestam (a) | |
| 2023 | | (Switzerland) Marco Iten | 206 | −7 | Playoff | (Italy) Giovanni Binaghi (a) (Switzerland) André Bossert (France) Michael Najburg (a) (Germany) Max Schliesing (a) | |
| 2022 | | (Switzerland) Loïc Ettlin (a) | 209 | −4 | 2 strokes | (Germany) Sven Cremer | |
| 2021 | | (Italy) Pietro Bovari (a) | 205 | −8 | 2 strokes | (Italy) Davide Buchi (a) | |
| 2020 | | (England) Harry Ellis | 194 | −19 | 9 strokes | (Switzerland) Mathias Eggenberger (Switzerland) Joel Girrbach | |
| 2019 | | (Switzerland) Loris Schuepbach (a) | 198 | −15 | 5 strokes | (Germany) Jakob Van der Flierdt (a) (Switzerland) Tom Gueant (a) | |
| 2018 | | (Switzerland) Raphaël De Sousa | 201 | −15 | 8 strokes | (Switzerland) Nicola Gerhardsen (a) | |
| 2017 | | (France) Adrien Bernadet | 205 | −11 | 2 strokes | (Italy) Andrea Maestroni | |
| 2016 | | (Germany) Allen John (a) | 209 | −7 | 3 strokes | (Germany) Mauro Anderi | |
| 2015 | | (Switzerland) Jeremy Freiburghaus (a) | 210 | −6 | 2 strokes | (Germany) Mauro Anderi | |
| 2014 | | (Spain) Manuel Quirós | 208 | | 1 stroke | (Switzerland) Raphaël De Sousa (Switzerland) Guy Woodman | |
| 2013 | | (Switzerland) Martin Rominger | 208 | | Playoff | (Italy) Andrea Maestroni | |
| 2012 | | (Germany) Maximilian Walz (a) | 208 | −8 | 1 stroke | (Switzerland) Damian Ulrich | |
| 2011 | | (Switzerland) Damian Ulrich | 212 | −4 | Playoff | (Switzerland) Nicolas Thommen (a) | |
| 2010 | | (Spain) Francisco Valera (3) | 216 | | | | |
| 2009 | | (Spain) Francisco Valera (2) | 210 | | 2 strokes | (Spain) Manuel Quirós | |
| 2008 | ALP | (France) Alan Bihan | 209 | −7 | Playoff | (Spain) Francisco Valera | |
| 2007 | ALP | (Italy) Alessandro Napoleoni (2) | 206 | −10 | 3 strokes | (France) Julien Grillon | |
| 2006 | ALP | (Spain) Agustín Domingo | 208 | −8 | 1 stroke | (Italy) Andrea Maestroni (France) Marc Mauret | |
| 2005 | ALP | (France) Bertrand Coathalem | 207 | −9 | 3 strokes | (Germany) Marcel Haremza | |
| 2004 | ALP | (France) Adrien Mörk | 206 | −10 | 5 strokes | (France) Christophe Pottier | |
| 2003 | ALP | (Chile) Felipe Aguilar | 207 | −12 | 3 strokes | (Italy) Emanuele Lattanzi | |
| 2002 | ALP | (Italy) Alessandro Napoleoni | 205 | −11 | 2 strokes | (Italy) Emanuele Lattanzi | |
| 2001 | ALP | (Italy) Stefano Reale | 209 | −7 | 4 strokes | (France) Alexandre Balicki | |
| 2000 | CHA | (Italy) Adriano Mori | 218 | +2 | Playoff | (England) Tim Huoýton (Switzerland) Jonathan Schaepper | |
| 1999 | | (Switzerland) Marcus Knight (2) | | | | | |
| 1998 | | (Switzerland) Marcus Knight | 204 | | Playoff | (Italy) Silvano Locatelli | |
| 1997 | CHA | (France) Raphaël Jacquelin | 137 (Note: Shortened to 36 holes due to rain.) | −5 | 2 strokes | (Switzerland) Carlos Duran (England) Denny Lucas (England) Gary Marks (England) Matt McGuire (Argentina) Marcos Moreno (Italy) Mario Tadini | |
| 1996 | CHA | (Spain) Juan Quirós | 205 | −8 | 5 strokes | (Switzerland) Dimitri Bieri (England) Matthew Hazelden | |
| 1995 | CHA | (England) Simon D. Hurley | 214 | +1 | 1 stroke | (Switzerland) Stefan Gort | |
| 1994 | CHA | (New Zealand) Michael Campbell | 206 | −7 | 3 strokes | (Northern Ireland) Raymond Burns | |
| 1993 | CHA | (Spain) Francisco Valera (a) | 210 | −3 | Playoff | (Italy) Michele Reale | |
| 1992 | CHA | (England) Jeff Hall | 205 | −8 | Playoff | (Wales) Stephen Dodd | |
| 1991 | | (Wales) Stephen Dodd | 280 | | 5 strokes | (England) Richard Foreman | |
| 1990 | CHA | (Italy) Giuseppe Calì | 280 | −4 | 3 strokes | (Italy) Emanuele Bolognesi (Italy) Renato Campagnoli | |
| 1989 | CHA | (Italy) Silvano Locatelli (2) | 273 | −11 | 3 strokes | (Switzerland) Paolo Quirici | |
| 1988 | | (England) Brian Evans (2) | 272 | | | | |
1987: No tournament
| 1986 | | (Italy) Silvano Locatelli | 280 | | 5 strokes | (Italy) Emanuele Bolognesi (Spain) Manuel García | |
| 1985 | | (England) Brian Evans | 280 | | 4 strokes | (Italy) Andrea Canessa (Italy) Mauro Bianco | |
1984: No tournament
| 1983 | | (Greece) Bassili Karatzas | 286 | | 1 stroke | (Italy) Gerolamo Delfino | |
| 1982 | | (Italy) Gerolamo Delfino (3) | 282 | | 5 strokes | (Italy) Silvano Locatelli | |
| 1981 | | (Italy) Gerolamo Delfino (2) | 288 | | 1 stroke | (England) Brian Evans (Italy) Silvano Locatelli | |
| 1980 | | (Italy) Alberto Croce (2) | 282 | | 9 strokes | (Italy) Gerolamo Delfino (Italy) Silvano Locatelli | |
| 1979 | | (Italy) Roberto Bernardini (2) | 284 | | 5 strokes | (Italy) Alberto Croce | |
| 1978 | | (Italy) Gerolamo Delfino | 289 | | 1 stroke | (Spain) Jaime Gallardo | |
| 1977 | | (Spain) José María Cañizares | 277 | | 2 strokes | (England) Malcolm Gregson | |
| 1976 | | (Italy) Alberto Croce | 291 | | 1 stroke | (Spain) Ángel Gallardo | |
| 1975 | | (Italy) Roberto Bernardini | 275 | | 4 strokes | (Italy) Silvano Locatelli | |
1974: No tournament
| 1973 | | (Spain) Ángel Gallardo | 208 | | 1 stroke | (Italy) Pietro Molteni | |
| 1972 | | (Spain) Manuel Gallardo | 208 | | 5 strokes | (Spain) Santiago Pérez | |
| 1971 | | (Spain) Santiago Pérez (2) | 211 | | Playoff | (Spain) Jaime Gallardo | |
| 1970 | | (Spain) Jaime Gallardo (2) | 211 | | 1 stroke | (France) Roger Cotton | |
| 1969 | | (Spain) Santiago Pérez | 207 | | 7 strokes | (France) Roger Cotton | |
| 1968 | | (Spain) Jaime Gallardo | 144 | | 1 stroke | (Spain) Ángel Gallardo | |
| 1967 | | (Belgium) Donald Swaelens (2) | 142 | | 4 strokes | (Italy) Aldo Casera | |
| 1966 | | (Belgium) Donald Swaelens | 143 | | 3 strokes | (Switzerland) Jacky Bonvin (France) Roger Cotton (Switzerland) Ronald Tingley | |
| 1965 | | (Italy) Carlo Grappasonni | 136 | | 6 strokes | (Italy) Aldo Casera | |
