= Gordon Manson =

Scottish-born Austrian golfer

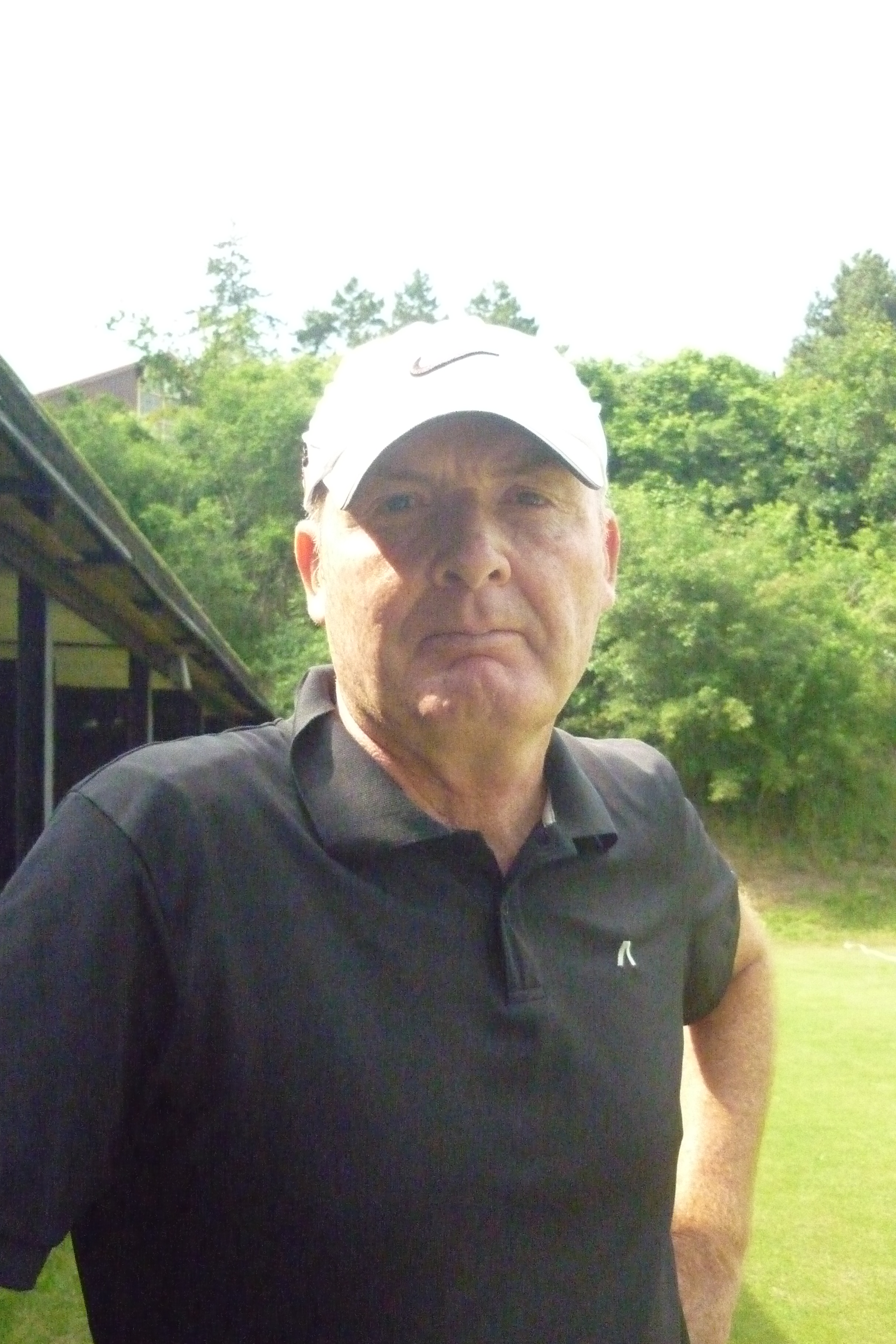

Personal information
- Full name: Gordon David Manson
- Nationality: Scotland; Austria
- Born: 19 May 1960 (age 66) St Andrews, Fife, Scotland
- Height: 1.94 m (6 ft 4 in)
- Weight: 96 kg (212 lb; 15.1 st)

Career
- Sport: Golf
- Turned professional: 1977
- Current tour: European Senior Tour
- Former tours: European Tour; Alps Tour
- Professional wins: 7

Number of wins by tour
- Challenge Tour: 1
- European Senior Tour: 2
- Other: 4

Best results in major championships
- Masters Tournament: DNP
- PGA Championship: DNP
- U.S. Open: DNP
- The Open Championship: CUT: 1981

Gordon David Manson (born 19 May 1960) is a Scottish-born Austrian professional golfer.

Manson has had a successful career on the European Senior Tour which he joined in 2011. Manson led the final stage of the 2010 Qualifying school after three of the four rounds but had a last round of 75 to finish tied for seventh place, receiving a conditional card for the 2011 season. He has won twice; the 2015 Swiss Seniors Open and the 2016 Acorn Jersey Open. He has also been runner-up in the 2014 Travis Perkins Masters, the 2015 ISPS Handa PGA Seniors Championship and the 2015 Prostate Cancer UK Scottish Senior Open. He was fourth in the 2015 European Senior Tour Order of Merit and ninth in 2016.

== Professional wins (7) ==
=== Challenge Tour wins (1) ===
| No. | Date | Tournament | Winning score | Margin of victory | Runner-up |
|---|---|---|---|---|---|
| 1 | 14 Feb 1993 | Nigerian Open | −10 (65-68-70-71=274) | 2 strokes | (France) Frédéric Regard |

=== Alps Tour wins (3) ===
| No. | Date | Tournament | Winning score | Margin of victory | Runner-up |
|---|---|---|---|---|---|
| 1 | 17 Jun 2001 | Gösser Open | −15 (67-70-69-67=273) | 7 strokes | (Austria) Martin Wiegele |
| 2 | 7 Oct 2001 | Intercontinental Open | −13 (69-64-70=204) | 1 stroke | (Austria) Claude Grenier |
| 3 | 4 May 2003 | Gösser Open (2) | −11 (68-73-64=205) | 2 strokes | (Italy) Matteo Verardo |

=== Other wins (1) ===
- 1993 Diners Club Championship

=== European Senior Tour wins (2) ===
| No. | Date | Tournament | Winning score | Margin of victory | Runner(s)-up |
|---|---|---|---|---|---|
| 1 | 5 Jul 2015 | Swiss Seniors Open | −14 (66-64-66=196) | 2 strokes | (England) Philip Golding |
| 2 | 11 Jun 2016 | Acorn Jersey Open | −10 (69-67-70=206) | Playoff | (England) Gary Wolstenholme, (Wales) Ian Woosnam |

European Senior Tour playoff record (1–1)

| No. | Year | Tournament | Opponent(s) | Result |
|---|---|---|---|---|
| 1 | 2015 | Prostate Cancer UK Scottish Senior Open | (England) Paul Broadhurst | Lost to birdie on second extra hole |
| 2 | 2016 | Acorn Jersey Open | (England) Gary Wolstenholme, (Wales) Ian Woosnam | Won with birdie on third extra hole |

== Results in major championships ==
| Tournament | 1981 |
|---|---|
| The Open Championship | CUT |

CUT = missed the half-way cut
Note: Manson only played in The Open Championship.

== Results in senior major championships ==
| Tournament | 2011 | 2012 | 2013 | 2014 | 2015 | 2016 | 2017 |
|---|---|---|---|---|---|---|---|
| Senior PGA Championship | | | | | | CUT | T74 |
| Senior British Open Championship | CUT | | | CUT | CUT | T41 | |

Did not play

"T" = Tied
CUT = missed the halfway cut
Note: Manson only played in the Senior PGA Championship and the Senior British Open Championship.

== Team appearances ==
- World Cup (representing Austria): 1997
