= Slovenia Open =

Slovenia Open may refer to:

- Slovenia Open (badminton), a badminton competition
- Slovenia Open (figure skating), a figure skating competition
- Slovenian Open (golf), a golf competition
- WTA Slovenia Open, a tennis tournament
