= Moroccan Golf Classic =

Golf tournament

Tournament information
- Location: El Jadida, Morocco
- Established: 2002
- Courses: Pullman Mazagan Royal Golf and Spa
- Par: 72
- Length: 6,808 yards (6,225 m)
- Tour: Challenge Tour
- Format: Stroke play
- Prize fund: €150,000
- Month played: June
- Final year: 2010

Tournament record score
- Aggregate: 264 Graeme Storm (2004)
- To par: −19 Adrien Mörk (2006)

Final champion
- (United States) Chris Baker
- Location in Morocco

The Moroccan Golf Classic was a golf tournament on the Challenge Tour. It ran annually from 2002 to 2010, except 2007.

== Winners ==
Year	Winner	Score	To par	Margin of victory	Runner(s)-up	Venue
Moroccan Golf Classic
2010	(United States) Chris Baker	275	−13	2 strokes	(Spain) Jesús María Arruti (Argentina) Pablo Del Grosso	Pullman Mazagan Royal
Moroccan Classic
2009	(England) Robert Coles	275	−13	4 strokes	(Australia) Matthew Zions	El Jadida Sofitel
Banque Populaire Moroccan Classic
2008	(Northern Ireland) Michael Hoey	276	−12	1 stroke	(Scotland) Greig Hutcheon (France) Julien Quesne	El Jadida Sofitel
Moroccan Classic
2007	Removed from the schedule					
Tikida Hotels Agadir Moroccan Classic
2006	(France) Adrien Mörk	265	−19	1 stroke	(Wales) Mark Pilkington (France) Julien van Hauwe	Golf du Soleil
Riu Tikida Hotels Moroccan Classic
2005	(Sweden) Fredrik Widmark	269	−15	Playoff	(England) Gary Clark (England) Oliver Whiteley	Golf du Soleil
Attijari Wafa - Tikida Beach Moroccan Classic
2004	(England) Graeme Storm	264	−16	4 strokes	(Argentina) Juan Abbate	Golf du Soleil
Panalpina Banque Commerciale du Maroc Classic
2003	(Scotland) Greig Hutcheon	284	−8	2 strokes	(Scotland) Scott Drummond	Royal Golf Dar es Salaam
2002	(France) Jean-François Lucquin	283	−9	5 strokes	(Republic of Ireland) Peter Lawrie	Royal Golf Dar es Salaam
