= 2008 Alps Tour =

Golf tour season

2008 Alps Tour season
- Duration: 19 March 2008 – 12 October 2008
- Number of official events: 22
- Most wins: (France) Dominique Nouailhac (3)
- Order of Merit: (France) Julien Grillon

The 2008 Alps Tour was the eighth season of the Alps Tour, a third-tier golf tour recognised by the European Tour.

== Schedule ==
The following table lists official events during the 2008 season.

Date	Tournament	Host country	Purse (€)	Winner (Note: The number in brackets after each winner's name is the number of Alps Tour events they had won up to and including that tournament. It is rare for someone to accumulate many wins on the Alps Tour as success at this level usually leads to promotion to the Challenge Tour.)
21 Mar	Open International de Mohammedia	Morocco	35,000	(France) Cédric Menut (1)
5 Apr	Feudo d'Asti Golf Open	Italy	55,000	(France) Marc Mauret (1)
18 Apr	Circolo Rapallo Golf Open	Italy	50,000	(France) Xavier Lazurowicz (2)
27 Apr	Tessali-Metaponto Open di Puglia e Basilicata	Italy	65,000	(Switzerland) Martin Rominger (2)
4 May	Gösser Open	Austria	39,000	(Austria) Martin Wiegele (1)
10 May	Uniqa FinanceLife Open	Austria	45,000	(France) Julien Grillon (1)
17 May	Masters 26 Dijon-Bourgogne	France	45,000	(France) Cédric Menut (2)
25 May	Open de Bordeaux	France	45,000	(France) Benoît Teilleria (3)
31 May	Lyoness Open	Austria	50,000	(France) Anthony Grenier (1)
8 Jun	Open du Haut Poitou	France	40,000	(France) Adrien Mörk (3)
15 Jun	Memorial Olivier Barras	Switzerland	39,000	(France) Alan Bihan (1)
21 Jun	Volturno International Open	Italy	50,000	(Italy) Andrea Signor (1)
28 Jun	Dobro Jutro Slovenia Open	Slovenia	45,000	(France) Dominique Nouailhac (1)
5 Jul	Czech Golf Open	Czech Republic	45,000	(Austria) Clemens Prader (3)
13 Jul	Open International de Normandie	France	50,000	(France) Dominique Nouailhac (2)
20 Jul	Omnium of Belgium	Belgium	50,000	(France) Jérôme Forestier (2)
31 Aug	AGF-Allianz Open - Trophee Preven's	France	60,000	(France) Julien Guerrier (2)
7 Sep	AGF-Allianz Open - Open de la Mirabelle d'Or	France	45,000	(France) Alexandre Mandonnet (1)
14 Sep	Open International Stade Français Paris	France	45,000	(France) Jean-François Remésy (3)
27 Sep	Open Golf Padova	Italy	40,000	(France) Julien Grillon (2)
4 Oct	Open La Margherita	Italy	40,000	(Italy) Marco Crespi (1)
12 Oct	Masters 13	France	50,000	(France) Dominique Nouailhac (3)

== Order of Merit ==
The Order of Merit was based on tournament results during the season, calculated using a points-based system. The top five players on the Order of Merit (not otherwise exempt) earned status to play on the 2009 Challenge Tour.

Position	Player	Points	Status earned
1	(France) Julien Grillon	40,530	Qualified for Challenge Tour (made cut in Q School)
2	(France) Victor Riu	35,336	Promoted to Challenge Tour
3	(France) Julien Guerrier	29,767	Qualified for Challenge Tour (made cut in Q School)
4	(France) Dominique Nouailhac	24,755	Qualified for Challenge Tour (made cut in Q School)
5	(France) Cédric Menut	24,096	Promoted to Challenge Tour
6	(France) Anthony Grenier	24,061	Qualified for Challenge Tour (made cut in Q School)
7	(France) Adrien Mörk	23,148	Promoted to Challenge Tour
8	(France) Jérôme Forestier	21,944	Promoted to Challenge Tour
9	(France) Xavier Lazurowicz	20,922	Promoted to Challenge Tour
10	(Italy) Matteo Delpodio	20,806	
