= Neuchâtel Open =

Golf tournament

Open de Neuchâtel
Tournament information
- Location: Saint-Blaise, Switzerland
- Established: 1982
- Course: Golf de Neuchâtel
- Par: 72
- Tours: Challenge Tour; Alps Tour
- Format: stroke play
- Prize fund: €45,000
- Month played: June
- Final year: 2007

Tournament record score
- Aggregate: 199 Rolf Muntz (1994); 199 Thomas Feyrsinger (2005)
- To par: −14 as above

Final champion
- (Switzerland) Marcus Knight
- Location in Switzerland

The Neuchâtel Open was a professional golf tournament that was played annually between 1982 and 2007 at Neuchâtel Golf Club in Saint-Blaise, Neuchâtel, Switzerland. It was a 54-hole stroke play tournament.

From 1990 to 2000 it was an event on the second-tier Challenge Tour, although it was an unofficial money event in some seasons. After being dropped from the Challenge Tour schedule, it became a fixture on the third-tier Alps Tour between 2001 and 2007.

== Winners ==
Year	Tour (Note: ALP − Alps Tour; CHA − Challenge Tour.)	Winner	Score	To par	Margin of victory	Runner(s)-up	Ref.
Open de Neuchâtel
2007	ALP	(Switzerland) Marcus Knight	205	−8	1 stroke	(England) Phil Rowe	
2006	ALP	(England) Gary Marks	202	−11	5 strokes	(Austria) Peter Lepitschnik	
2005	ALP	(Austria) Thomas Feyrsinger	199	−14	1 stroke	(France) Lionel Alexandre (England) Gary Marks	
2004	ALP	(Belgium) Jérôme Theunis	205	−8	5 strokes	(Germany) Marc Chatelain (Switzerland) Raphaël De Sousa (Switzerland) Bilbo Perrot (France) Vincent Simoni	
2003	ALP	(France) Alexandre Balicki	204	−9	1 stroke	(Switzerland) Alexandre Chopard	
UBS Warburg Golf Open
2002	ALP	(Spain) Fernando Roca	200	−13	3 strokes	(Spain) Josep Romero	
2001	ALP	(France) Bertrand Cornut	202	−11	5 strokes	(Switzerland) Alexandre Chopard (France) Nicolas Kalouguine	
UBS Warburg Swiss Golf Open Neuchâtel
2000	CHA	(Switzerland) Steve Rey	205	−8	1 stroke	(Switzerland) Juan Ciola	
Neuchâtel Open Golf Trophy
1999	CHA	(Sweden) Richard S. Johnson	201	−12	1 stroke	(Germany) Erol Şimşek	
1998		(Switzerland) Christophe Bovet	200	−13	5 strokes	(England) John Lawson	
Neuchâtel Open
1997	CHA	(Germany) Erol Şimşek	204	−9	3 strokes	(Australia) Stephen Leaney	
Neuchâtel Open Golf Trophy
1996	CHA	(Italy) Federico Bisazza	205	−8	Playoff	(Germany) Heinz-Peter Thül	
Neuchâtel Open SBS Trophy
1995	CHA	(Belgium) Nicolas Vanhootegem	200	−13	2 strokes	(Italy) Michele Reale	
1994	CHA	(Netherlands) Rolf Muntz	199	−14	1 stroke	(England) Neal Briggs (England) Philip Talbot (Sweden) Daniel Westermark	
Open de Neuchâtel
1993	CHA	(Switzerland) Paolo Quirici	207	−6	Playoff	(France) Stéphane De Marboeuf (England) Paul Simpson	
Neuchâtel Open SBS Trophy
1992	CHA	(Germany) Heinz-Peter Thül (2)	136 (Note: Shortened to 36 holes due to rain.)	−6	1 stroke	(Switzerland) Gavin Healey	
1991	CHA	(Germany) Heinz-Peter Thül	206	−7	1 stroke	(Sweden) Daniel Westermark	
Neuchâtel Open
1990	CHA	(Switzerland) André Bossert	208	−5	3 strokes	(England) Nick Godin	
1989	CHA	(England) Brian Evans (3)	206	−7	Playoff	(Spain) Manuel García	
Open Browning de Neuchâtel
1988		(United States) Jonas Saxton	212	−1	1 stroke	(Switzerland) Karim Baradie	
1987		(England) Brian Evans (2)	212	−1			
1986		(England) Tim Huyton	137	−5			
1985		(England) Brian Evans	209	−4			
1984		(Italy) Silvano Locatelli	209	−4	Playoff		
1983		(Italy) Pietro Molteni	214	+1	1 stroke	(Spain) Raffael Gallardo	
1982		(Spain) Manuel Gallardo	211	−2	8 strokes		
