= Lorenzo Gagli =

Italian professional golfer (born 1985)

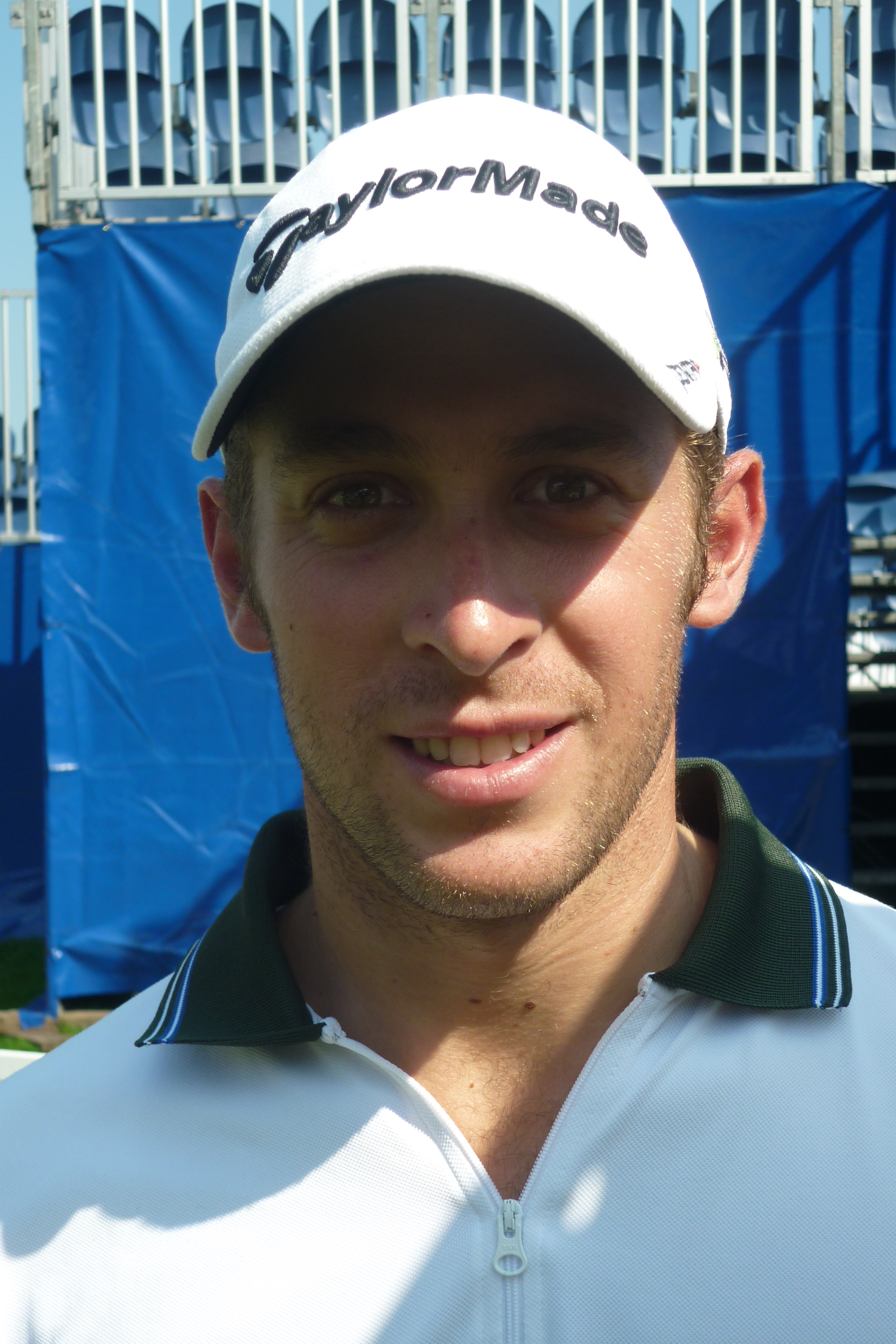

Personal information
- Nationality: Italy
- Born: 14 October 1985 (age 41) Florence, Italy
- Height: 1.78 m (5 ft 10 in)
- Weight: 70 kg (150 lb; 11 st)

Career
- Sport: Golf
- Turned professional: 2006
- Current tour: Challenge Tour
- Former tours: European Tour; Alps Tour
- Professional wins: 5

Number of wins by tour
- Challenge Tour: 1
- Other: 4

Lorenzo Gagli (born 14 October 1985) is an Italian professional golfer. He won the 2018 Barclays Kenya Open, his first win on the Challenge Tour.

== Professional career ==
In 2006, Gagli turned professional. He spent 2007 on the Alps Tour, where he finished fourth on the Order of Merit. As a result, he was promoted to the Challenge Tour, where he played for the 2008 season. He graduated from the qualifying school in 2008 to earn promotion for the European Tour in 2009, but struggled for form at that level and divided his season between the European and Challenge Tours. He again came through qualifying school at the end of 2009, but once again bounced between tours for 2010. A strong finish to the year left him 17th on the Challenge Tour rankings, which earned him promotion to the European Tour once more for 2011.

Gagli's best finishes on the European Tour are a T3 at the 2011 Barclays Scottish Open and sole 2nd at the 2011 Madrid Masters. Gagli has been featured in the top 150 of the Official World Golf Ranking.

== Professional wins (5) ==
=== Challenge Tour wins (1) ===
No.	Date	Tournament	Winning score	Margin of victory	Runner-up
1	25 Mar 2018	Barclays Kenya Open	−11 (68-68-69-68=273)	Playoff	(Sweden) Jens Fahrbring

Challenge Tour playoff record (1–0)

No.	Year	Tournament	Opponent	Result
1	2018	Barclays Kenya Open	(Sweden) Jens Fahrbring	Won with par on third extra hole

=== Alps Tour wins (3) ===
No.	Date	Tournament	Winning score	Margin of victory	Runner(s)-up
1	9 Sep 2007	Open de la Mirabelle d'Or	−21 (68-69-65-65=267)	1 stroke	(France) Elvis Galéra
2	5 Oct 2007	Open La Margherita	−17 (65-66-68=199)	4 strokes	(Italy) Gregory Molteni
3	2 Nov 2007	UNA Hotels Resort Open	−11 (68-71-66=205)	2 strokes	(Italy) Alessio Bruschi, (France) Charles-Édouard Russo

=== Other wins (1) ===
- 2010 Italian PGA Championship

== Playoff record ==
European Tour playoff record (0–1)

No.	Year	Tournament	Opponents	Result
1	2019	Omega European Masters	(Northern Ireland) Rory McIlroy, (Argentina) Andrés Romero, (Finland) Kalle Samooja, (Sweden) Sebastian Söderberg	Söderberg won with birdie on first extra hole

== Team appearances ==
Amateur

- Jacques Léglise Trophy (representing Continental Europe): 2003
- European Youths' Team Championship (representing Italy): 2004, 2006
- European Amateur Team Championship (representing Italy): 2005
- Eisenhower Trophy (representing Italy): 2006
- St Andrews Trophy (representing the Continent of Europe): 2006

Professional

- European Championships (representing Italy): 2018

== See also ==
- 2008 European Tour Qualifying School graduates
- 2009 European Tour Qualifying School graduates
- 2010 Challenge Tour graduates
- 2017 European Tour Qualifying School graduates
- 2018 Challenge Tour graduates
