= 2003 Alps Tour =

Golf tour season

2003 Alps Tour season
- Duration: 18 March 2003 – 24 October 2003
- Number of official events: 19
- Most wins: (Italy) Emanuele Lattanzi (3)
- Order of Merit: (Italy) Emmanuele Lattanzi

The 2003 Alps Tour was the third season of the Alps Tour, a third-tier golf tour recognised by the European Tour.

== Schedule ==
The following table lists official events during the 2003 season.

Date	Tournament	Host country	Purse (€)	Winner (Note: The number in brackets after each winner's name is the number of Alps Tour events they had won up to and including that tournament. It is rare for someone to accumulate many wins on the Alps Tour as success at this level usually leads to promotion to the Challenge Tour.)
21 Mar	Packaging Open	Morocco	45,000	(France) Benoît Teilleria (2)
19 Apr	Open de la Commission Professionnelle	France	40,000	(France) Grégory Bourdy (1)
4 May	Gösser Open	Austria	30,000	(Austria) Gordon Manson (3)
18 May	Open de Marcilly	France	45,000	(France) Jean-Louis Guépy (1)
23 May	Open Cassa di Risparmio di Firenze	Italy	30,000	(Italy) Marco Bernardini (1)
1 Jun	Open de Bordeaux	France	40,000	(France) Grégory Bourdy (2)
13 Jun	Intersport EYBL NÖ Open	Austria	27,000	(Switzerland) Alexandre Chopard (1)
17 Jun	Waldviertel Open	Austria	27,000	(Chile) Felipe Aguilar (1)
22 Jun	Memorial Olivier Barras	Switzerland	35,000	(Chile) Felipe Aguilar (2)
28 Jun	Citibank Open	Italy	30,000	(Italy) Emanuele Lattanzi (1)
5 Jul	Open de Neuchâtel	Switzerland	30,000	(France) Alexandre Balicki (2)
11 Jul	Memorial Antonio Roncoroni	Italy	35,000	(Italy) Emanuele Lattanzi (2)
31 Jul	Brianza Open	Italy	27,000	(Italy) Emanuele Lattanzi (3)
19 Aug	Intercontinental Open	Austria	30,000	(Italy) Andrea Zanini (3)
13 Sep	Steigenberger Open	Austria	30,000	(France) Elvis Galéra (1)
19 Sep	Asolo Open	Italy	30,000	(Switzerland) Alexandre Chopard (2)
12 Oct	Open de Poitiers	France	40,000	(France) Raphaël Pellicioli (2)
19 Oct	Masters 13	France	50,000	(France) Jean-François Remésy (1)
24 Oct	Montecatini International Open	Italy	30,000	(France) Jean-Marc de Polo (1)

== Order of Merit ==
The Order of Merit was based on prize money won during the season, calculated in euros. The top four players on the Order of Merit earned status to play on the 2004 Challenge Tour.

Position	Player	Prize money (€)	Status earned
1	(Italy) Emmanuele Lattanzi	25,857	Promoted to Challenge Tour
2	(Switzerland) Alexandre Chopard	20,074	Promoted to Challenge Tour
3	(France) Jean-Marc de Polo	18,595	Promoted to Challenge Tour
4	(France) Philippe Lima	18,179	Promoted to Challenge Tour
5	(France) Grégory Bourdy	17,461	
6	(France) Sarel Son-Houi	17,408	
7	(France) Elvis Galéra	15,398	
8	(France) Mickaël Dieu	12,479	
9	(France) Jean-Nicolas Billot	11,935	
10	(France) Bruno-Teva Lecuona	11,215	
