= Adrien Mörk =

French professional golfer

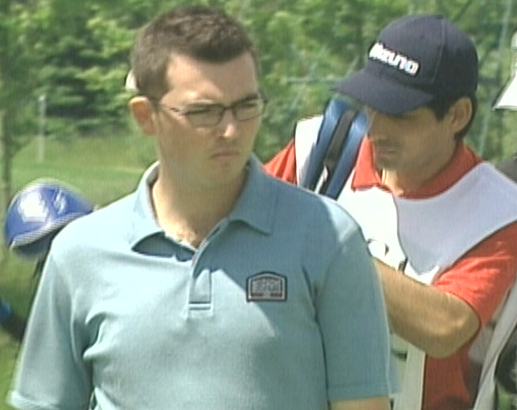
- Mörk at the 2006 BA-CA Golf Open

Personal information
- Nationality: France
- Born: 19 September 1979 (age 47) Montbéliard, France
- Height: 1.78 m (5 ft 10 in)

Career
- Sport: Golf
- College: McNeese State University
- Turned professional: 2004
- Former tours: European Tour; Challenge Tour
- Professional wins: 5

Number of wins by tour
- Challenge Tour: 2
- Other: 3

Adrien Mörk (born 19 September 1979) is a French professional golfer. In 2006 he recorded the first ever sub 60 round on any tour run by the PGA European Tour.

== Career ==
Mörk was born in Montbéliard. He attended McNeese State University in the United States. He has been a professional since 2004 and, after finding success on the third tier Alps Tour, was a Challenge Tour rookie in 2006.

On 26 May 2006, in the second round of the Tikida Hotels Agadir Moroccan Classic, Mörk shot the first 59 in the history of the Challenge Tour, European Tour or European Seniors Tour. This was his scorecard:

Hole	1	2	3	4	5	6	7	8	9	Out	10	11	12	13	14	15	16	17	18	In	Total
Par	4	4	5	3	4	3	5	4	4	36	4	4	4	3	5	4	4	4	3	35	71
Score	4	6	3	2	3	2	4	3	3	30	3	4	3	2	4	3	4	3	3	29	59

He went on to win the tournament by one stroke. He also won the OKI Mahou Challenge de Espana later in the season as he finished 20th in the final Challenge Tour Rankings to graduate to the European Tour for 2007.

Mörk's rookie season on the European Tour in 2007 proved fruitless, and he found himself back on the lower level tours in the following seasons.

== Professional wins (5) ==
=== Challenge Tour wins (2) ===
No.	Date	Tournament	Winning score	Margin of victory	Runner(s)-up
1	28 May 2006	Tikida Hotels Agadir Moroccan Classic	−19 (63-59-74-69=265)	1 stroke	(Wales) Mark Pilkington, (France) Julien van Hauwe
2	24 Sep 2006	OKI Mahou Challenge de España	−17 (73-67-69-62=271)	2 strokes	(Wales) Kyron Sullivan

=== Alps Tour wins (3) ===
No.	Date	Tournament	Winning score	Margin of victory	Runner(s)-up
1	20 Jun 2004	Memorial Olivier Barras	−10 (67-70-69=206)	5 strokes	(France) Christophe Pottier
2	25 Mar 2005	Trophée Moroc Telecom	−6 (70-72-71=213)	5 strokes	(France) Raphaël Eyraud, (Spain) Francisco Valera
3	8 Jun 2008	Open du Haut Poitou	−10 (70-70-69=209)	4 strokes	(France) Eric Moreul

== Team appearances ==
Amateur

- European Amateur Team Championship (representing France): 2003

== See also ==
- 2006 Challenge Tour graduates
- Lowest rounds of golf
