= Slovenian Open (golf) =

Golf tournament

LUMAR Slovenian Golf Open
Tournament information
- Location: Ptuj, Slovenia
- Established: 1997
- Course: Ptuj Golf Club
- Par: 71
- Length: 6,264 yards (5,728 m)
- Tours: Challenge Tour; Alps Tour
- Format: Stroke play
- Prize fund: €40,000
- Month played: May
- Final year: 2012

Tournament record score
- Aggregate: 270 Warren Bennett (1998)
- To par: −22 as above

Final champion
- (England) Chris McDonnell
- Location in Slovenia

The Slovenian Open was a golf tournament on the Challenge Tour and the Alps Tour, played in Slovenia. It was held from 1997 to 1999 on the Challenge Tour, at the Bled Golf Club in Bled. From 2008 to 2012 it was played on the Alps Tour at the Ptuj Golf Club in Ptuj.

== Winners ==
Year	Tour (Note: ALP − Alps Tour; CHA − Challenge Tour.)	Winner	Score	To par	Margin of victory	Runner(s)-up	Ref.
LUMAR Slovenian Golf Open
2012	ALP	(England) Chris McDonnell	205	−8	Playoff	(France) Thomas Fournier	
Slovenian Golf Open
2011	ALP	(England) Jason Barnes	205	−8	3 strokes	(France) Guillaume Cambis	
2010	ALP	(Spain) Carlos Balmaseda	205	−8	3 strokes	(France) Matthieu Bey	
2009	ALP	(Italy) Marco Crespi	195	−18	10 strokes	(England) Sam Robinson	
Dobro Jutro Slovenia Open
2008	ALP	(France) Dominique Nouailhac	202	−11	1 stroke	(Austria) Christoph Pfau	
2000–2007: No tournament
BTC Slovenian Open
1999	CHA	(Australia) Grant Dodd	274	−18	2 strokes	(Austria) Markus Brier (Denmark) Nils Roerbaek-Petersen	
1998	CHA	(England) Warren Bennett	270	−22	3 strokes	(Sweden) Mikael Lundberg (France) Marc Pendariès	
1997	CHA	(Sweden) Kalle Brink	271	−21	3 strokes	(Sweden) Mikael Lundberg	

== See also ==
- Open golf tournament
