= 2002 Alps Tour =

Golf tour season

2002 Alps Tour season
- Duration: 20 February 2002 – 22 November 2002
- Number of official events: 16
- Most wins: (France) Lionel Alexandre (2) (France) David Dupart (2) (Italy) Alessandro Napoleoni (2) (Italy) Marco Soffietti (2)
- Order of Merit: (Italy) Alessandro Napoleoni

The 2002 Alps Tour was the second season of the Alps Tour, a third-tier golf tour recognised by the European Tour.

== Schedule ==
The following table lists official events during the 2002 season.

Date	Tournament	Host country	Purse (€)	Winner (Note: The number in brackets after each winner's name is the number of Alps Tour events they had won up to and including that tournament. It is rare for someone to accumulate many wins on the Alps Tour as success at this level usually leads to promotion to the Challenge Tour.)
23 Feb	Memorial Richard Olalainty	France	45,000	(France) Benoît Teilleria (1)
5 May	Gösser Open	Austria	25,000	(Italy) Marco Soffietti (1)
17 May	Salsomaggiore Terme Open	Italy	25,000	(Italy) Francesco Guermani (1)
24 May	Quattroruote Open	Italy	40,000	(France) David Dupart (1)
2 Jun	Open de Bordeaux	France	42,500	(France) Nicolas Beaufils (1)
23 Jun	Memorial Olivier Barras	Switzerland	40,000	(Italy) Alessandro Napoleoni (2)
7 Jul	UBS Warburg Golf Open	Switzerland	65,000	(Spain) Fernando Roca (1)
12 Jul	Memorial Antonio Roncoroni	Italy	40,000	(Italy) Alessandro Napoleoni (3)
19 Jul	Memorial A. Angelini	Italy	40,000	(Italy) Alberto Binaghi (1)
18 Aug	Niederösterreich Open	Austria	25,000	(Austria) Clemens Prader (1)
25 Aug	Ottenstein Open	Austria	25,000	(Italy) Marco Soffietti (2)
14 Sep	Intercontinental Open	Austria	25,000	(France) David Dupart (2)
29 Sep	Open de Toulouse	France	50,000	(France) Julien van Hauwe (2)
6 Oct	Open de Poitiers	France	42,500	(France) Frédéric Cupillard (1)
19 Oct	Ufficio Stile Open	Italy	25,000	(France) Lionel Alexandre (1)
22 Nov	Sanremo Open	Italy	25,000	(France) Lionel Alexandre (2)

== Order of Merit ==
The Order of Merit was based on prize money won during the season, calculated in euros. The top four players on the Order of Merit earned status to play on the 2003 Challenge Tour.

Position	Player	Prize money (€)	Status earned
1	(Italy) Alessandro Napoleoni	28,022	Promoted to Challenge Tour
2	(Italy) Marco Soffietti	26,917	Promoted to Challenge Tour
3	(France) Lionel Alexandre	26,457	Promoted to Challenge Tour
4	(France) David Dupart	23,847	Promoted to Challenge Tour
5	(Italy) Emanuele Lattanzi	21,455	
6	(France) Nicolas Beaufils	12,685	
7	(France) Jean-Nicolas Billot	11,985	
8	(France) Frédéric Cupillard	11,706	
9	(France) Cédric Doucet	11,392	
10	(Italy) Gianluca Pietrobono	7,696	
