= 2001 Alps Tour =

Golf tour season

2001 Alps Tour season
- Duration: 22 March 2001 – 28 November 2001
- Number of official events: 16
- Most wins: (France) Bertrand Cornut (2) (Austria) Gordon Manson (2) (Italy) Stefano Reale (2)
- Order of Merit: (Italy) Stefano Reale

The 2001 Alps Tour was the inaugural season of the Alps Tour, a third-tier golf tour recognised by the European Tour.

== Schedule ==
The following table lists official events during the 2001 season.

Date	Tournament	Host country	Purse (€)	Winner (Note: The number in brackets after each winner's name is the number of Alps Tour events they had won up to and including that tournament. It is rare for someone to accumulate many wins on the Alps Tour as success at this level usually leads to promotion to the Challenge Tour.)
25 Mar	Memorial Richard Olalainty	France	45,000	(France) Mickaël Dieu (1)
6 Apr	Executive Group Modena Open	Italy	25,000	(Italy) Baldovino Dassù (1)
6 May	Donau Open	Austria	19,000	(France) Maxime Demory (1)
1 Jun	Il Bipop Carire Open	Italy	25,000	(Italy) Silvio Grappasonni (1)
3 Jun	Open de Bordeaux	France	30,000	(France) Bertrand Cornut (1)
17 Jun	Gösser Open	Austria	19,000	(Austria) Gordon Manson (1)
24 Jun	Memorial Olivier Barras	Switzerland	36,000	(Italy) Stefano Reale (1)
1 Jul	UBS Warburg Golf Open	Switzerland	67,000	(France) Bertrand Cornut (2)
13 Jul	Quattroruote Open	Italy	43,000	(Italy) Stefano Reale (2)
12 Aug	Murtal Open	Austria	22,000	(France) Alexandre Balicki (1)
19 Aug	NÖ Open	Austria	22,000	(Italy) Alessandro Napoleoni (1)
15 Sep	Steigenberger Open	Austria	22,000	(Austria) Markus Brier (1)
29 Sep	Open de Toulouse	France	60,000	(France) Roger Sabarros (1)
7 Oct	Intercontinental Open	Austria	22,000	(Austria) Gordon Manson (2)
14 Oct	Il Selesta Open	Italy	25,000	(France) Julien van Hauwe (1)
28 Nov	Riviera dei Fiori Open	Italy	25,000	(Italy) Gianluca Pietrobono (1)

== Order of Merit ==
The Order of Merit was based on prize money won during the season, calculated in euros. The top four players on the Order of Merit earned status to play on the 2002 Challenge Tour.

Position	Player	Prize money (€)	Status earned
1	(Italy) Stefano Reale	23,332	Promoted to Challenge Tour
2	(France) Bertrand Cornut	23,011	Promoted to Challenge Tour
3	(France) Alexandre Balicki	13,869	Promoted to Challenge Tour
4	(France) Julien van Hauwe	12,230	Promoted to Challenge Tour
5	(France) Roger Sabarros	12,219	
6	(Italy) Alessandro Tadini	11,924	
7	(Italy) Alessandro Napoleoni	11,423	
8	(Italy) Marco Soffietti	10,439	
9	(France) Mickaël Dieu	10,334	
10	(Italy) Gianluca Pietrobono	10,286	
