= 2005 Alps Tour =

Golf tour season

2005 Alps Tour season
- Duration: 23 March 2005 – 23 October 2005
- Number of official events: 18
- Most wins: (Austria) Thomas Feyrsinger (3)
- Order of Merit: (France) Cédric Menut

The 2005 Alps Tour was the fifth season of the Alps Tour, a third-tier golf tour recognised by the European Tour.

== Schedule ==
The following table lists official events during the 2005 season.

Date	Tournament	Host country	Purse (€)	Winner (Note: The number in brackets after each winner's name is the number of Alps Tour events they had won up to and including that tournament. It is rare for someone to accumulate many wins on the Alps Tour as success at this level usually leads to promotion to the Challenge Tour.)
25 Mar	Trophée Maroc Telecom	Morocco	35,000	(France) Adrien Mörk (2)
1 Apr	Open de Fès	Morocco	35,000	(Italy) Giorgio Grillo (1)
8 Apr	Open de Mohammedia	Morocco	35,000	(Morocco) Mustapha El Kharraz (1)
15 May	Open de Bordeaux	France	45,000	(Belgium) Nicolas Colsaerts (1)
28 May	Gösser Open	Austria	35,000	(Austria) Thomas Feyrsinger (1)
5 Jun	Open International Côtes d'Armor Bretagne	France	50,000	(France) Nicolas Joakimides (1)
19 Jun	Memorial Olivier Barras	Switzerland	35,000	(France) Bertrand Coathalem (1)
24 Jun	Open Le Fronde	Italy	35,000	(Italy) Andrea Zani (2)
3 Jul	Open de Neuchâtel	Switzerland	45,000	(Austria) Thomas Feyrsinger (2)
8 Jul	Open La Margherita	Italy	35,000	(Italy) Matteo Peroni (1)
20 Aug	MAN NÖ Open	Austria	55,000	(Austria) Markus Brier (2)
25 Aug	Waldviertel Open	Austria	35,000	(Spain) Francisco Valera (1)
4 Sep	Open International de la Mirabelle d'Or	France	45,000	(France) Mike Lorenzo-Vera (a) (1)
11 Sep	Uniqa FinanceLife Styrian Open	Austria	45,000	(Austria) Florian Praegant (a) (1)
17 Sep	Open International Stade Français Paris	France	45,000	(France) Grégory Bourdy (3)
30 Sep	Open La Pavoniere	Italy	35,000	(Austria) Thomas Feyrsinger (3)
9 Oct	Open du Haut Poitou	France	40,000	(France) Renaud Guillard (1)
23 Oct	Masters 13	France	50,000	(Portugal) José-Filipe Lima (2)

== Order of Merit ==
The Order of Merit was based on tournament results during the season, calculated using a points-based system. The top five players on the Order of Merit (not otherwise exempt) earned status to play on the 2006 Challenge Tour.

Position	Player	Points	Status earned
1	(France) Cédric Menut	38,931	Qualified for Challenge Tour (made cut in Q School)
2	(Spain) Francisco Valera	31,029	Qualified for European Tour (Top 25 in Q School)
3	(Austria) Thomas Feyrsinger	29,944	Promoted to Challenge Tour
4	(France) Bertrand Coathalem	22,771	Promoted to Challenge Tour
5	(France) Adrien Mörk	18,739	Promoted to Challenge Tour
6	(France) Anthony Snobeck	16,845	Promoted to Challenge Tour
7	(France) Jean-Marc de Polo	15,958	Promoted to Challenge Tour
8	(France) Renaud Guillard	15,800	
9	(Austria) Clemens Prader	15,633	
10	(Austria) Thomas Kogler	13,410	
