= 2010 Alps Tour =

Golf tour season

2010 Alps Tour season
- Duration: 16 February 2010 – 23 October 2010
- Number of official events: 22
- Most wins: (Italy) Matteo Delpodio (3)
- Order of Merit: (Italy) Matteo Delpodio

The 2010 Alps Tour was the 10th season of the Alps Tour, a third-tier golf tour recognised by the European Tour.

== Schedule ==
The following table lists official events during the 2010 season.

Date	Tournament	Host country	Purse (€)	Winner (Note: The number in brackets after each winner's name is the number of Alps Tour events they had won up to and including that tournament. It is rare for someone to accumulate many wins on the Alps Tour as success at this level usually leads to promotion to the Challenge Tour.)
19 Feb	Open de Mogador	Morocco	60,000	(England) Lawrence Dodd (1)
13 Mar	Peugeot Tour Escorpión	Spain	48,000	(Italy) Matteo Delpodio (1)
17 Apr	Peugeot Tour Empordà	Spain	48,000	(Scotland) Raymond Russell (1)
2 May	Gösser Open	Austria	40,000	(Spain) Juan Antonio Bragulat (1)
9 May	Lyoness Open	Austria	65,000	(France) Alan Bihan (2)
16 May	Slovenian Golf Open	Slovenia	40,000	(Spain) Carlos Balmaseda (1)
28 May	Montecchia Golf Open	Italy	45,000	(England) Adam Hodkinson (1)
6 Jun	Open International d'Île-de-France	France	50,000	(Italy) Nunzio Lombardi (1)
11 Jun	Le Fonti Golf Open	Italy	45,000	(France) Alan Bihan (3)
20 Jun	Open International de Normandie	France	50,000	(Italy) Matteo Delpodio (2)
27 Jun	Open de la Mirabelle d'Or	France	45,000	(Spain) Juan Antonio Bragulat (2)
3 Jul	Haugschlag NÖ Open	Austria	45,000	(England) Matthew Cryer (2)
10 Jul	Peugeot Tour Madrid	Spain	48,000	(Spain) Álvaro Salto (1)
7 Aug	Uniqa FinanceLife Open	Austria	45,000	(England) Jason Palmer (1)
15 Aug	Omnium of Belgium	Belgium	45,000	(Austria) Uli Weinhandl (2)
29 Aug	Peugeot Classic Omnium International	France	40,000	(Spain) Agustín Domingo (3)
12 Sep	Feudo d'Asti Golf Open	Italy	45,000	(Scotland) Gavin Dear (1)
19 Sep	Allianz Open Stade Français Paris	France	50,000	(France) Raphaël Eyraud (1)
2 Oct	Acaya Golf Open	Italy	45,000	(England) Jason Barnes (1)
9 Oct	Peugeot Tour Alps de España	Italy	48,000	(Austria) Uli Weinhandl (3)
17 Oct	Masters 13	France	45,000	(Italy) Matteo Delpodio (3)
23 Oct	Open di Puglia e Basilicata	Italy	45,000	(Spain) Miguel Pujalte Sastre (1)

== Order of Merit ==
The Order of Merit was based on tournament results during the season, calculated using a points-based system. The top five players on the Order of Merit earned status to play on the 2011 Challenge Tour.

Position	Player	Points	Status earned
1	(Italy) Matteo Delpodio	44,632	Promoted to Challenge Tour
2	(England) Jason Palmer	36,807	Promoted to Challenge Tour
3	(France) Alan Bihan	34,875	Promoted to Challenge Tour
4	(Scotland) Gavin Dear	33,762	Promoted to Challenge Tour
5	(England) Matthew Cryer	31,886	Promoted to Challenge Tour
6	(Spain) Juan Antonio Bragulat	29,437	
7	(Austria) Uli Weinhandl	23,825	
8	(England) Jason Barnes	23,629	
9	(Spain) Agustín Domingo	20,397	
10	(Spain) Carlos Balmaseda	17,964	
