= Jean-François Lucquin =

French professional golfer

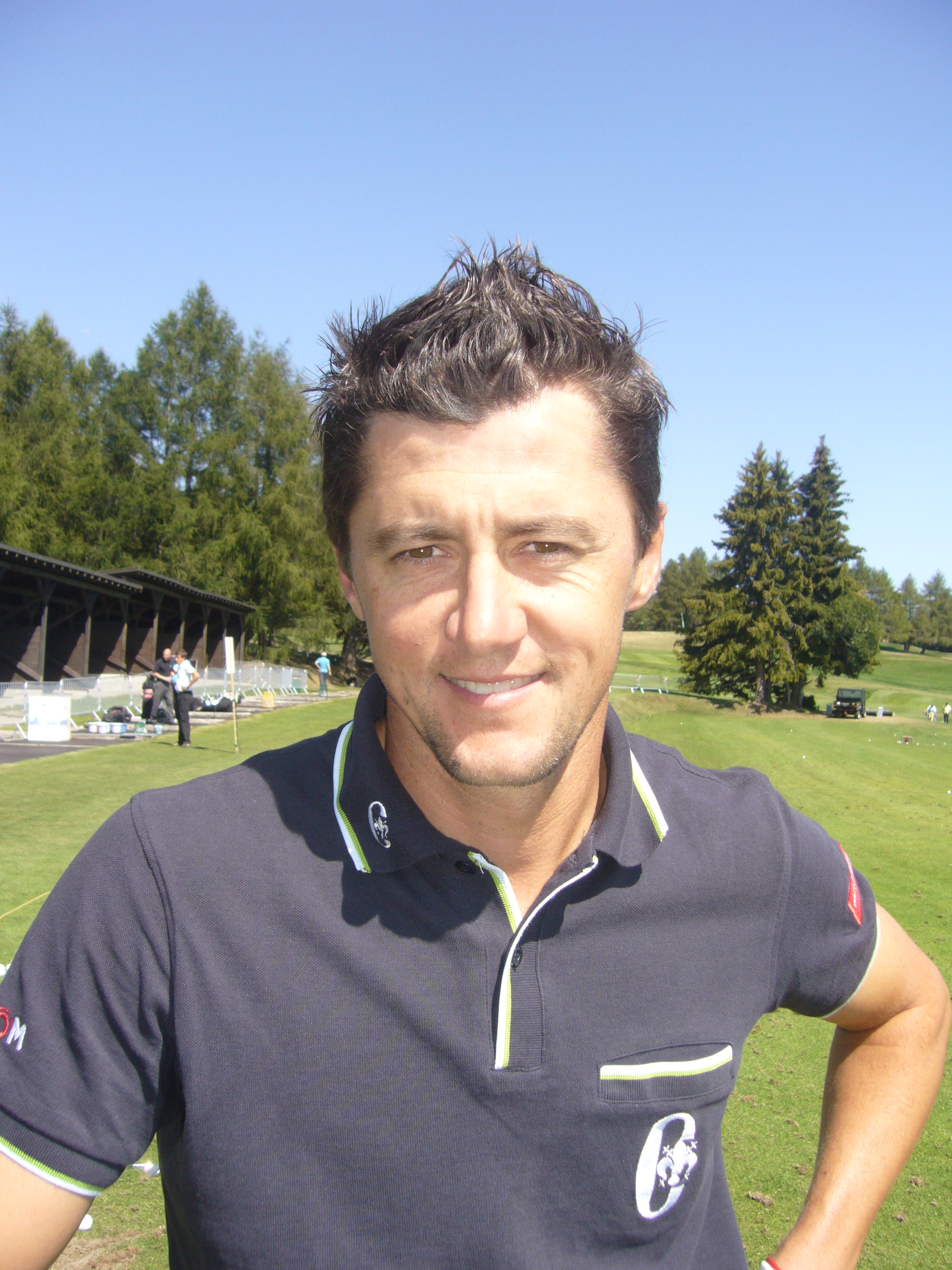

Personal information
- Full name: Jean-François Lucquin
- Nickname: Jeff
- Nationality: France
- Born: 25 December 1978 (age 47) Valence, Drôme, France
- Height: 1.75 m (5 ft 9 in)
- Weight: 60 kg (132 lb; 9 st 6 lb)
- Children: 1

Career
- Sport: Golf
- Turned professional: 1997
- Former tour: European Tour
- Professional wins: 5

Number of wins by tour
- European Tour: 1
- Challenge Tour: 1
- Other: 3

Best results in major championships
- Masters Tournament: DNP
- PGA Championship: DNP
- U.S. Open: T54: 2009
- The Open Championship: DNP

Jean-François "Jeff" Lucquin (born 25 December 1978) is a French professional golfer.

== Career ==
Having played on the Challenge Tour for four seasons, Lucquin finally gained his place on the European Tour for 2003 by finishing second in the 2002 Challenge Tour rankings, winning the Panalpina Banque Commerciale du Maroc Classic along the way.

After struggling in his first season on the European Tour, Lucquin regained his card for the following season at the qualifying school. He then improved his standing each year, until winning in 2008 his first European Tour title at the Omega European Masters, defeating Rory McIlroy in a playoff, and went on to finish the season ranked 52nd on the Order of Merit.

He lost his exemption after the 2010 season. He announced the end of his professional career in December 2016 to work as a coach assisting Benoît Ducoulombier.

== Amateur wins ==
- 1997 French Youths Championship

== Professional wins (5) ==
=== European Tour wins (1) ===
No.	Date	Tournament	Winning score	Margin of victory	Runner-up
1	7 Sep 2008	Omega European Masters	−13 (68-67-69-67=271)	Playoff	(Northern Ireland) Rory McIlroy

European Tour playoff record (1–0)

No.	Year	Tournament	Opponent	Result
1	2008	Omega European Masters	(Northern Ireland) Rory McIlroy	Won with birdie on second extra hole

=== Challenge Tour wins (1) ===
No.	Date	Tournament	Winning score	Margin of victory	Runner-up
1	14 Apr 2002	Panalpina Banque Commerciale du Maroc Classic	−9 (64-69-71-69=283)	5 strokes	(Republic of Ireland) Peter Lawrie

=== Other wins (3) ===
- 1999 Moliets, Gujan-Mestras, Omnium National (all French Tour)

== Results in major championships ==
Tournament	2009	2010
U.S. Open	T54	CUT

CUT = missed the half-way cut
"T" = tied for place
Note: Lucquin only played in the U.S. Open.
