= Julien Quesne =

French professional golfer

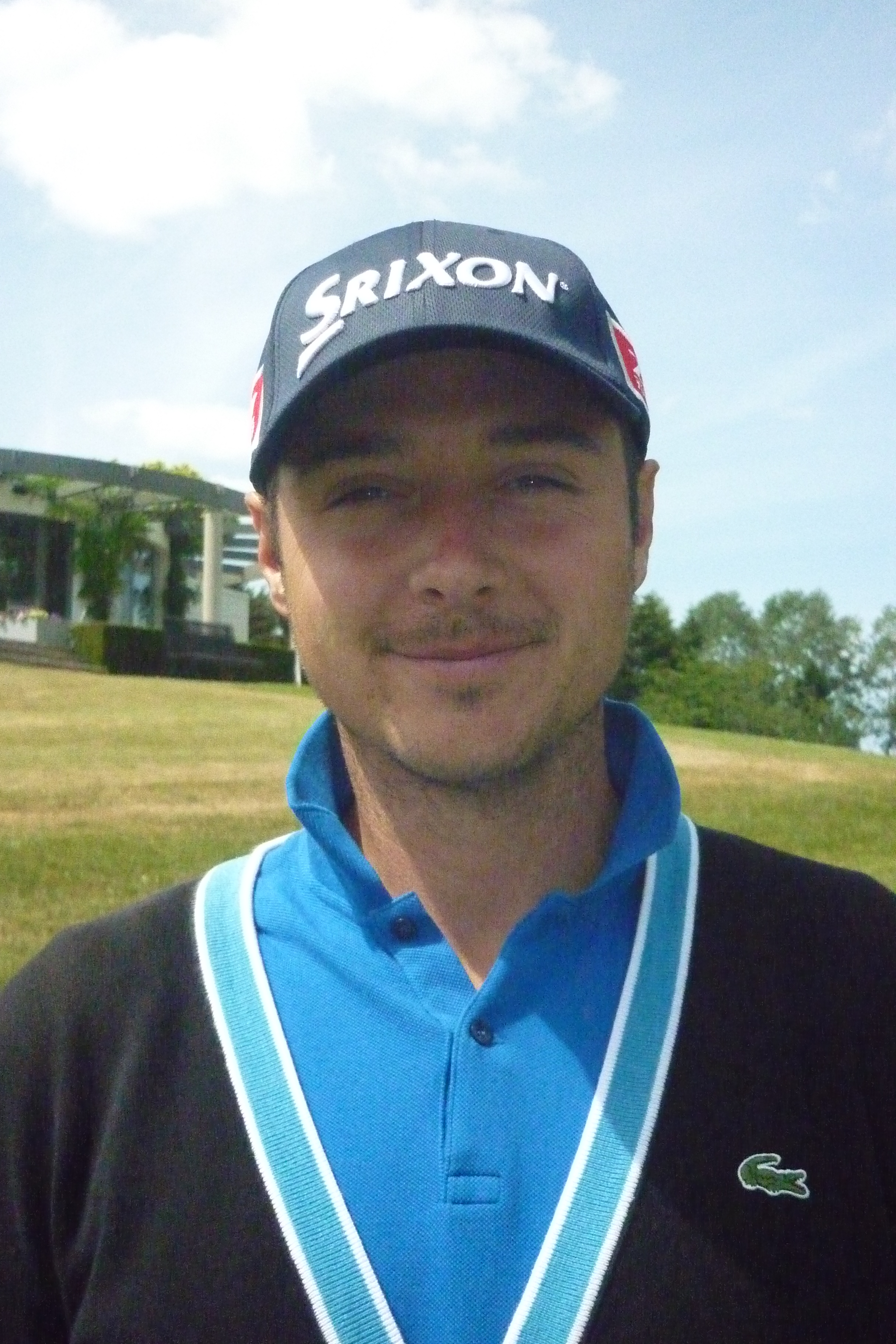

Personal information
- Full name: Julien Quesne
- Nationality: France
- Born: 16 August 1980 (age 46) Le Mans, France
- Height: 1.85 m (6 ft 1 in)
- Weight: 88 kg (194 lb; 13.9 st)

Career
- Sport: Golf
- Turned professional: 2003
- Current tours: European Tour; Challenge Tour
- Former tour: Alps Tour
- Professional wins: 10

Number of wins by tour
- European Tour: 2
- Challenge Tour: 2
- Other: 6

Achievements and awards
- Alps Tour Order of Merit winner: 2007

Julien Quesne (pronounced [ʒyljɛ̃ kɛn]; born 16 August 1980) is a French professional golfer who plays on the European Tour.

== Career ==
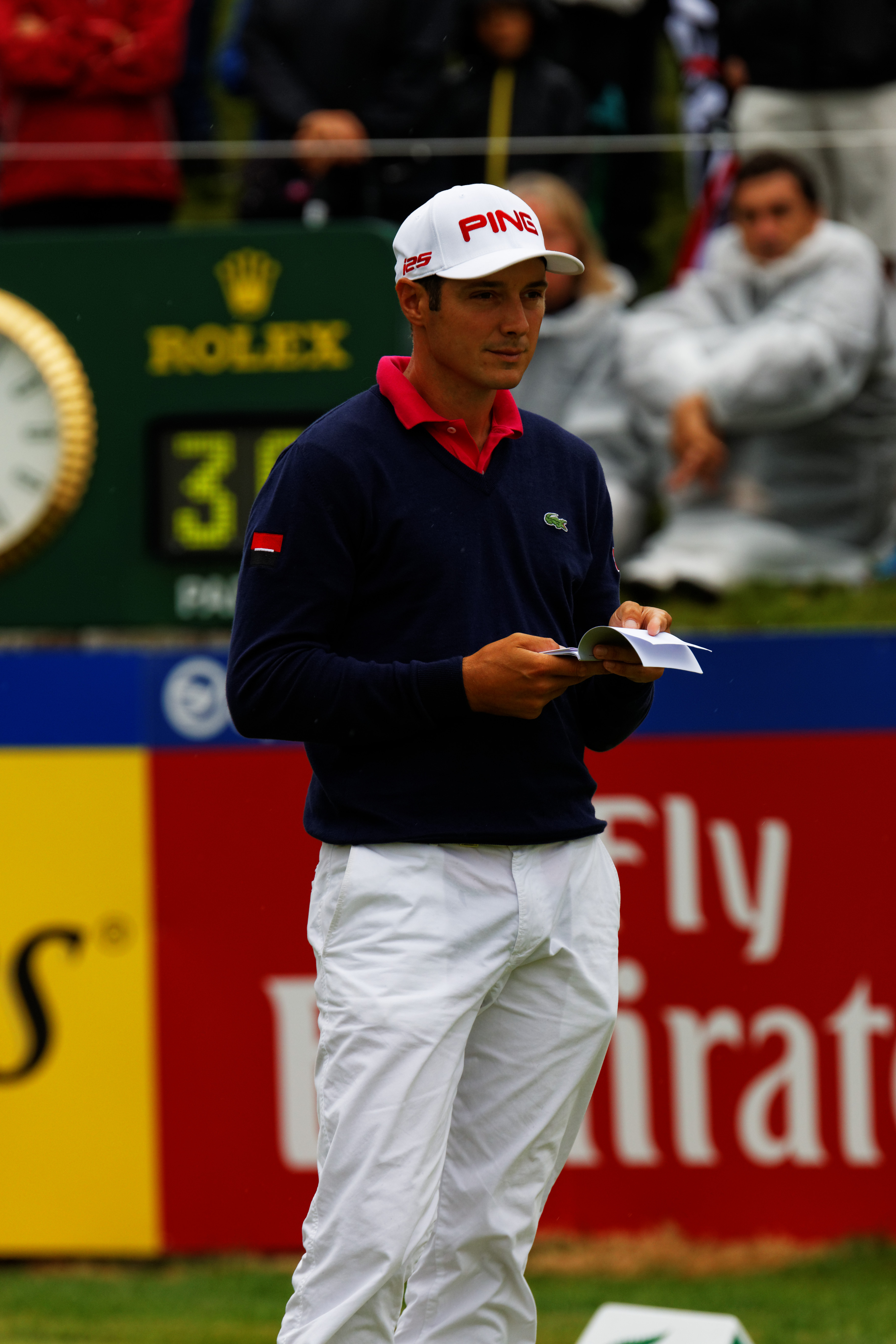
Julien Quesne

Quesne was born in Le Mans, France. In 2003, Quesne turned professional and joined the Alps Tour. He gained a place on the second tier Challenge Tour for 2005 by reaching the final stage of the European Tour Qualifying School at the end of 2004. He has played on the tour since then, except for 2007 when he returned to the Alps Tour for a season. That season, he won three tournaments and topped the Alps Tour Order of Merit to graduate back to the Challenge Tour for the 2008 season.

Quesne picked up his first victory on the Challenge Tour at the 2009 Trophée du Golf de Genève in Switzerland on his 29th birthday. He began the final round one stroke behind Edoardo Molinari but his final round of 66 (6 under par) saw him finish one stroke clear of the Italian.

Quesne won his first European Tour event at the Open de Andalucía Costa del Sol in 2012. Prior to his win, Quesne was ranked 322nd in the world and never finished higher than 16th on the European Tour. In September 2013, Quesne claimed his second European Tour victory at the Italian Open. He finished one shot in front of David Higgins and Steve Webster.

== Professional wins (10) ==
=== European Tour wins (2) ===
No.	Date	Tournament	Winning score	Margin of victory	Runner(s)-up
1	18 Mar 2012	Open de Andalucía Costa del Sol	−17 (68-72-67-64=271)	2 strokes	(Italy) Matteo Manassero
2	22 Sep 2013	Open d'Italia Lindt	−12 (70-68-71-67=276)	1 stroke	(Republic of Ireland) David Higgins, (England) Steve Webster

=== Challenge Tour wins (2) ===
No.	Date	Tournament	Winning score	Margin of victory	Runner-up
1	16 Aug 2009	Trophée du Golf de Genève	−19 (63-69-71-66=269)	1 stroke	(Italy) Edoardo Molinari
2	9 Oct 2011	Allianz Golf Open de Lyon	−16 (66-67-67-68=268)	2 strokes	(Belgium) Pierre Relecom

=== Alps Tour wins (4) ===
No.	Date	Tournament	Winning score	Margin of victory	Runner(s)-up
1	26 Mar 2004	Trophée Maroc Telecom	−10 (73-67-69=209)	1 stroke	(Italy) Massimo Scarpa
2	15 Jul 2007	Open International de Normandie	−12 (72-65-66-69=272)	2 strokes	(France) Cyrille Cormier, (Italy) Matteo Delpodio, (Spain) Agustín Domingo
3	2 Sep 2007	AGF-Allianz Open - Trophee Preven's	−7 (70-69-69-69=277)	3 strokes	(France) Bruno-Teva Lecuona
4	16 Sep 2007	Open International Stade Français Paris	−9 (69-72-68-70=279)	Playoff	(France) Anthony Grenier, (France) Eric Moreul

=== French Tour wins (2) ===
No.	Date	Tournament	Winning score	Margin of victory	Runners-up
1	10 Dec 2023	Internationaux de France Professionnels de Double (with Matthieu Pavon)	−18 (63-68-67=198)	2 strokes	(Belgium) Axel de Smet and (Belgium) Christopher Mivis
2	4 Apr 2025	Open PGA France de Mont de Marsan	−16 (63-66-68=197)	6 strokes	(France) Antoine Auboin, (France) Romain Guillon

== Results in World Golf Championships ==
Tournament	2012
Match Play	
Championship	
Invitational	
Champions	T42

Did not play

"T" = Tied

== See also ==
- 2009 Challenge Tour graduates
- 2011 Challenge Tour graduates
