= 2026 Alps Tour =

Golf tour season

2026 Alps Tour season
- Duration: 17 February 2026 – 17 October 2026
- Number of official events: 18
- Most wins: (France) Alexandre Vandermoten (5)
- Order of Merit: (France) Alexandre Vandermoten

The 2026 Alps Tour was the 26th season of the Alps Tour, a third-tier golf tour recognised by the European Tour.

== Schedule ==
The following table lists official events during the 2026 season.

Date	Tournament	Host country	Purse (€)	Winner (Note: The number in brackets after each winner's name is the number of Alps Tour events they had won up to and including that tournament. It is rare for someone to accumulate many wins on the Alps Tour as success at this level usually leads to promotion to the Challenge Tour.)	OWGR points
19 Feb	Ein Bay Open	Egypt	42,500	(Republic of Ireland) Sam Murphy (1)	0.70
24 Feb	Red Sea Little Venice Open	Egypt	42,500	(Italy) Andrea Romano (3)	0.69
1 Mar	New Giza Open	Egypt	42,500	(Italy) Andrea Romano (4)	0.69
11 Apr	Villa Paradiso Alps Open	Italy	49,100	(France) Alexandre Vandermoten (1)	1.01
21 Apr	Dreamland Open	Egypt	42,500	(France) Maxime Legros (1)	0.86
26 Apr	Allegria Open	Egypt	42,500	(France) Paul Franquet (1)	0.85
2 May	Miglianico Alps Open	Italy	49,700	(France) Maxime Legros (2)	0.98
16 May	Gösser Open	Austria	49,700	(Spain) Alejandro Rodríguez Andreu (1)	0.88
23 May	Lacanau Alps Open	France	53,000	(France) Anthony Grenier (2)	0.99
30 May	Open de Roissy PGA France	France	53,000	(Italy) Andrea Romano (5)	0.96
7 Jun	Open de la Mirabelle d'Or	France	48,000	(France) Maxime Legros (3)	0.85
13 Jun	Alps de Andalucía-Roquetas de Mar	Spain	54,550	(Italy) Enrico Di Nitto (4)	0.87
27 Jun	UGolf Aravell Golf Andorra Open	Spain	49,700	(France) Alexandre Vandermoten (2)	0.78
4 Jul	Fred Olsen Alps de La Gomera	Spain	46,000	(Netherlands) Lars Keunen (3)	0.70
11 Jul	Alps de Las Castillas	Spain	53,000	(Italy) Flavio Michetti (1)	1.02
26 Jul	Biarritz Cup	France	50,000	(Spain) Jorge Maicas (2)	0.89
5 Sep	Longwy Alps Open	France	52,000	(France) Alexandre Vandermoten (3)	0.87
12 Sep	Hauts de France – Pas de Calais Golf Open	France	45,000	(France) Alexandre Vandermoten (4)	0.72
9 Oct	Memorial Giorgio Bordoni	Italy	47,000	(Italy) Andrea Romano (6)	0.97
17 Oct	Hulencourt Alps Tour Grand Final	Belgium	57,000	(France) Alexandre Vandermoten (5)	0.83

== Order of Merit ==
The Order of Merit was based on tournament results during the season, calculated using a points-based system. The top five players on the Order of Merit (not otherwise exempt) earned status to play on the 2027 Challenge Tour (HotelPlanner Tour).

Position	Player	Points	Status earned
1	(France) Alexandre Vandermoten	43,421	Qualified for Challenge Tour (made cut in Q School)
2	(Italy) Andrea Romano	36,180	Promoted to Challenge Tour
3	(France) Maxime Legros	28,467	Promoted to Challenge Tour
4	(Spain) Mario Galiano	26,604	Promoted to Challenge Tour
5	(Italy) Alessandro Nodari	26,108	Promoted to Challenge Tour
6	(Spain) Pablo Alperi López	26,027	Promoted to Challenge Tour
7	(France) Paul Franquet	23,585	
8	(Republic of Ireland) Robert Moran	22,154	
9	(Spain) Víctor García Broto	21,060	
10	(Italy) Enrico Di Nitto	20,277	
