= Heinz-Peter Thül =

German professional golfer

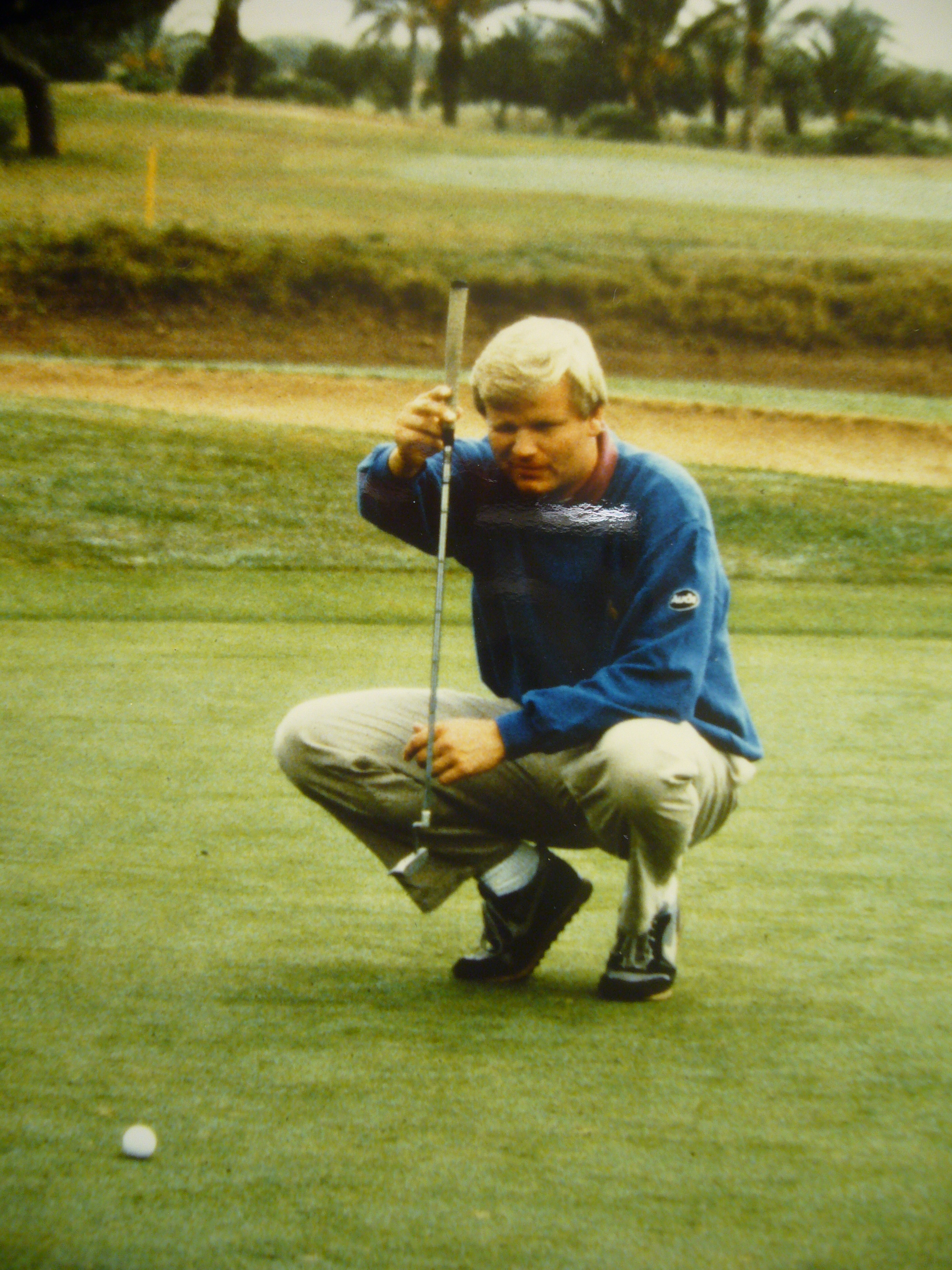

Personal information
- Nationality: Germany
- Born: 27 July 1963 (age 63) Cologne, West Germany
- Height: 1.83 m (6 ft 0 in)

Career
- Sport: Golf
- Turned professional: 1980
- Former tours: European Tour; Challenge Tour
- Professional wins: 4

Number of wins by tour
- Challenge Tour: 3
- Other: 1

Heinz-Peter Thül (born 27 July 1963) is a German professional golfer who played on the European Tour.

Thül started playing golf at age 8 and has played in 350 tournaments over three decades. By the time of Bernhard Langer's wedding in 1984 he was considered Germany's number two golfer, and as such would team up with Langer in international matches such as World Cup and Dunhill Cup.

== Professional career ==
Thül began his professional career in 1980 and played in his first European Tour the same year. He played another 40 events throughout the decade with limited success, which shifted when he started competing on the nascent Challenge Tour towards the end of the decade. On the Challenge Tour he recorded four victories between 1988 and 1992, and remained the only German winner until Sven Strüver won the American Express Trophy in 1993. Thül won the 1991 Neuchatel Open in Switzerland, a title he successfully defended a year later, and almost won again in 1996, but lost in a playoff. A pair of runner-up finishes in 1991 ensured Thül finished the year 13th on the Challenge Tour Order of Merit, a result he bettered only once in the next six years when he finished 11th in 1997. In total, Thül played over 65 Challenge Tour events 1991–2003, recording two wins and six runner-up finishes, in addition to the two Challenge Tour events he won before the order of merit was introduced in 1990.

Thül played almost 200 European Tour events between 1980 and 2000, recording six top-10 finishes. He won the 1989 European Tour Qualifying School at La Manga, and finished 11th on the 1997 Challenge Tour Rankings, earning a spot on the 1998 European Tour. At the 13th hole of the 1st round of the 1993 Spanish Open, he was struck by lightning, but was able to continue playing and finished the tournament in 8th place.

Thül has represented Germany in four World Cups, with best finish fifth place at the 1992 World Cup where he teamed up with Bernhard Langer. He has also represented Germany in three Dunhill Cups, with best finish a tie for fifth in 1992, together with Bernhard Langer and Torsten Giedeon.

== Professional wins (4) ==
=== Challenge Tour wins (3) ===
No.	Date	Tournament	Winning score	Margin of victory	Runner-up
1	28 May 1989	Ramlösa Open	−9 (72-65-72-70=279)	Playoff	(Sweden) Fredrik Gemmel
2	7 Jul 1991	Neuchâtel Open SBS Trophy	−7 (206)	1 stroke	(Sweden) Daniel Westermark
3	12 Jul 1992	Neuchâtel Open SBS Trophy (2)	−6 (67-69=136) (Note: Shortened to 36 holes due to weather.)	1 stroke	(Switzerland) Gavin Healey

Challenge Tour playoff record (1–3)

No.	Year	Tournament	Opponent	Result
1	1989	Ramlösa Open	(Sweden) Fredrik Gemmel	
2	1996	Neuchâtel Open Golf Trophy	(Italy) Federico Bisazza	Lost to birdie on ninth extra hole
3	1997	Challenge Tour Championship	(Australia) Greg Chalmers	Lost to par on second extra hole
4	1997	Sovereign Russian Open	(Italy) Michele Reale	Lost to par on second extra hole

=== Other wins (1) ===
- 1988 Torneo dei Campioni

== Team appearances ==
Professional

- World Cup (representing Germany): 1982, 1989, 1992, 1999
- Alfred Dunhill Cup (representing Germany): 1992, 1995, 1996
