= Mallorca Classic =

Tournament information
- Location: Mallorca, Spain
- Established: 2003
- Course: Pula Golf Club
- Par: 70
- Length: 6,850 yards (6,260 m)
- Tours: European Tour; Challenge Tour
- Format: Stroke play
- Prize fund: €2,000,000
- Month played: October
- Final year: 2007

Tournament record score
- Aggregate: 268 Sergio García (2004); 268 Grégory Bourdy (2007)
- To par: −12 as above

Final champion
- (France) Grégory Bourdy
- Location in Spain Location in the Balearic Islands Location in Mallorca

The Mallorca Classic was a men's professional golf tournament on the European Tour, held between 2003 and 2007 at Pula Golf in Mallorca. It marked the return of the tour to the island, having previously played host to the Open de Baleares between 1988 and 1995.

In 2003 it was a dual-ranking event which also featured on the Challenge Tour calendar, before becoming a full European Tour event in 2004. From 2005 to 2007 it was the last tournament on the regular schedule before the "tour championship", the Volvo Masters, and as such was the last chance for players to make the top 115 on the Order of Merit to retain their tour card for the following season. In its final year the prize fund was €2 million. Its place on the European Tour schedule was taken by the Castelló Masters Costa Azahar for 2008.

== Winners ==
Year	Tour(s) (Note: CHA − Challenge Tour; EUR − European Tour.)	Winner	Score	To par	Margin of victory	Runner(s)-up
Mallorca Classic
2007	EUR	(France) Grégory Bourdy	268	−12	2 strokes	(England) Sam Little
2006	EUR	(Sweden) Niclas Fasth	275	−5	3 strokes	(Spain) Sergio García
2005	EUR	(Spain) José María Olazábal	270	−10	5 strokes	(England) Paul Broadhurst (Spain) Sergio García (Spain) José Manuel Lara
2004	EUR	(Spain) Sergio García	268	−12	4 strokes	(England) Simon Khan
Turespaña Mallorca Classic
2003	CHA, EUR	(Spain) Miguel Ángel Jiménez	204 (Note: Shortened to 54 holes due to weather.)	−6	1 stroke	(Spain) José María Olazábal
