= 2007 Alps Tour =

Golf tour season

2007 Alps Tour season
- Duration: 7 December 2006 – 2 November 2007
- Number of official events: 21
- Most wins: (Italy) Lorenzo Gagli (3) (France) Julien Quesne (3)
- Order of Merit: (France) Julien Quesne

The 2007 Alps Tour was the seventh season of the Alps Tour, a third-tier golf tour recognised by the European Tour.

== Schedule ==
The following table lists official events during the 2007 season.

Date	Tournament	Host country	Purse (€)	Winner (Note: The number in brackets after each winner's name is the number of Alps Tour events they had won up to and including that tournament. It is rare for someone to accumulate many wins on the Alps Tour as success at this level usually leads to promotion to the Challenge Tour.)
10 Dec	Open de la Réunion	Réunion	53,000	(England) Phil Rowe (1)
16 Mar	Open CDG Développement	Morocco	35,000	(France) Julien Guerrier (a) (1)
23 Mar	RGAM Open	Morocco	35,000	(France) Bertrand Coathalem (2)
31 Mar	Trophée Maroc Telecom	Morocco	35,000	(France) Lionel Alexandre (3)
9 May	Maremma International Cordial Open	Italy	40,000	(France) Charles-Édouard Russo (2)
20 May	Gösser Open	Austria	35,000	(France) Thomas Fournier (1)
27 May	Open de Bordeaux	France	45,000	(France) Frédéric Cupillard (2)
10 Jun	Open du Haut Poitou	France	40,000	(France) Benoît Bozio (1)
17 Jun	Memorial Olivier Barras	Switzerland	39,000	(Italy) Alessandro Napoleoni (4)
1 Jul	Open de Neuchâtel	Switzerland	45,000	(Switzerland) Marcus Knight (1)
15 Jul	Open International de Normandie	France	50,000	(France) Julien Quesne (2)
22 Jul	Volturno International Open	Italy	40,000	(France) Benoît Bozio (2)
29 Jul	Schärding Baroque Open	Austria	40,000	(France) Bruno-Teva Lecuona (2)
3 Aug	Sestriere International Open	Italy	40,000	(Italy) Marco Soffietti (3)
2 Sep	AGF-Allianz Open - Trophee Preven's	France	60,000	(France) Julien Quesne (3)
9 Sep	Open de la Mirabelle d'Or	France	45,000	(Italy) Lorenzo Gagli (1)
16 Sep	Open International Stade Français Paris	France	45,000	(France) Julien Quesne (4)
29 Sep	Masters 26 Dijon-Bourgogne	France	40,000	(France) Sarel Son-Houi (1)
5 Oct	Open La Margherita	Italy	40,000	(Italy) Lorenzo Gagli (2)
14 Oct	Masters 13	France	50,000	(France) Mike Lorenzo-Vera (3)
2 Nov	UNA Hotels Resort Open	Italy	40,000	(Italy) Lorenzo Gagli (3)

== Order of Merit ==
The Order of Merit was based on tournament results during the season, calculated using a points-based system. The top five players on the Order of Merit (not otherwise exempt) earned status to play on the 2008 Challenge Tour.

Position	Player	Points	Status earned
1	(France) Julien Quesne	37,716	Promoted to Challenge Tour
2	(Austria) Roland Steiner	30,496	Qualified for Challenge Tour (made cut in Q School)
3	(France) Bruno-Teva Lecuona	26,151	Promoted to Challenge Tour
4	(Italy) Lorenzo Gagli	25,187	Promoted to Challenge Tour
5	(France) Charles-Édouard Russo	23,429	Promoted to Challenge Tour
6	(Italy) Michele Reale	22,971	Promoted to Challenge Tour
7	(France) Julien Grillon	22,796	
8	(England) Phil Rowe	22,512	
9	(Italy) Gregory Molteni	20,931	
10	(France) Benoît Bozio	20,816	
