= 2004 Alps Tour =

Golf tour season

2004 Alps Tour season
- Duration: 24 November 2003 – 22 October 2004
- Number of official events: 20
- Most wins: (France) Nicolas Marin (2) (Austria) Niki Zitny (2)
- Order of Merit: (Italy) Andrea Maestroni

The 2004 Alps Tour was the fourth season of the Alps Tour, a third-tier golf tour recognised by the European Tour.

== Schedule ==
The following table lists official events during the 2004 season.

Date	Tournament	Host country	Purse (€)	Winner (Note: The number in brackets after each winner's name is the number of Alps Tour events they had won up to and including that tournament. It is rare for someone to accumulate many wins on the Alps Tour as success at this level usually leads to promotion to the Challenge Tour.)
26 Nov	Sanremo Open	Italy	30,000	(Austria) Clemens Prader (2)
7 Dec	Open du Bassin Bleu	France	50,000	(France) Jean-Marc de Polo (2)
19 Mar	Packaging Open	Morocco	40,000	(France) Nicolas Marin (1)
26 Mar	Trophée Maroc Telecom	Morocco	40,000	(France) Julien Quesne (1)
2 Apr	Royal Moroccan Pro Tour Open	Morocco	40,000	(Italy) Fernando Pasqualucci (1)
9 May	Open de Bordeaux	France	40,000	(France) Raphaël Eyraud (1)
16 May	Open de Marcilly	France	45,000	(Italy) Andrea Maestroni (1)
6 Jun	Open International Côtes d'Armor Bretagne	France	50,000	(France) Julien Millet (a) (1)
13 Jun	Gösser Open	Austria	32,000	(Italy) Alessio Bruschi (1)
20 Jun	Memorial Olivier Barras	Switzerland	35,000	(France) Adrien Mörk (1)
26 Jun	Le Fronde Open	Italy	30,000	(France) Jean-Nicolas Billot (1)
4 Jul	Open de Neuchâtel	Switzerland	30,000	(Belgium) Jérôme Theunis (1)
23 Jul	Brianza Open	Italy	30,000	(Italy) Stefano Reale (3)
21 Aug	MAN NÖ Open	Austria	50,000	(Austria) Niki Zitny (1)
26 Aug	Golferlebnis Waldviertel Open	Austria	30,000	(France) Nicolas Marin (2)
12 Sep	Intercontinental Open	Austria	30,000	(Austria) Niki Zitny (2)
23 Sep	Asolo Open	Italy	30,000	(Italy) Marco Bernardini (2)
3 Oct	Open de Poitiers	France	40,000	(France) Eric Moreul (1)
17 Oct	Masters 13	France	50,000	(France) Philippe Lima (1)
22 Oct	Montecatini Terme International Open	Italy	40,000	(France) Bertrand Cornut (3)

== Order of Merit ==
The Order of Merit was based on tournament results during the season, calculated using a points-based system. The top five players on the Order of Merit (not otherwise exempt) earned status to play on the 2005 Challenge Tour.

Position	Player	Points	Status earned
1	(Italy) Andrea Maestroni	28,335	Qualified for European Tour (Top 25 in Q School)
2	(France) Bertrand Cornut	26,443	Qualified for Challenge Tour (made cut in Q School)
3	(France) Eric Chaudouet	23,350	Promoted to Challenge Tour
4	(Switzerland) Raphaël De Sousa	21,027	Promoted to Challenge Tour
5	(France) Raphaël Eyraud	19,427	Promoted to Challenge Tour
6	(Italy) Massimo Scarpa	19,088	Promoted to Challenge Tour
7	(France) Nicolas Marin	16,637	Promoted to Challenge Tour
8	(France) Eric Moreul	15,970	
9	(France) Jean-Nicolas Billot	15,844	
10	(Italy) Gianluca Pietrobono	15,093	
