= 2011 Alps Tour =

Golf tour season

2011 Alps Tour season
- Duration: 10 March 2011 – 21 October 2011
- Number of official events: 18
- Most wins: (England) Chris Paisley (3)
- Order of Merit: (France) Guillaume Cambis

The 2011 Alps Tour was the 11th season of the Alps Tour, a third-tier golf tour recognised by the European Tour.

== Schedule ==
The following table lists official events during the 2011 season.

| Date | Tournament | Host country | Purse (€) | Winner (Note: The number in brackets after each winner's name is the number of Alps Tour events they had won up to and including that tournament. It is rare for someone to accumulate many wins on the Alps Tour as success at this level usually leads to promotion to the Challenge Tour.) |
|---|---|---|---|---|
| 12 Mar | Peugeot Tour de Valencia | Spain | 48,000 | (England) Chris Paisley (1) |
| 30 Apr | Peugeot Open de Catalunya | Spain | 48,000 | (England) Chris Paisley (2) |
| 15 May | Slovenian Golf Open | Slovenia | 40,000 | (England) Jason Barnes (2) |
| 22 May | Gösser Open | Austria | 40,000 | (Scotland) Scott Henry (1) |
| 29 May | Open de Saint François Guadeloupe | Guadeloupe | 50,000 | (Spain) Ignacio Sánchez-Palencia (1) |
| 19 Jun | Feudo d'Asti Golf Open | Italy | 40,000 | (Italy) Cristiano Terragni (1) |
| 26 Jun | Allianz Open de la Mirabelle d'Or | France | 50,000 | (France) Clément Sordet (a) (1) |
| 1 Jul | Milan Zoate Golf Open | Italy | 40,000 | (Norway) Jason Kelly (1) |
| 9 Jul | Open du Haut Poitou | France | 40,000 | (France) Michael Hill (1) |
| 16 Jul | Peugeot Tour Alps de España | Spain | 48,000 | (Spain) Carlos García Simarro (1) |
| 22 Jul | Le Fonti Open | Italy | 40,000 | (Italy) Marco Crespi (4) |
| 14 Aug | Flory Van Donck Trophy | Belgium | 45,000 | (Italy) Marco Crespi (5) |
| 27 Aug | Styrian Mountain Golf Open | Austria | 45,000 | (England) Chris Paisley (3) |
| 11 Sep | Open International de Normandie | France | 50,000 | (France) Romain Schneider (1) |
| 17 Sep | Internorm Dolomiti Golf Open | Italy | 45,000 | (England) Farren Keenan (1) |
| 24 Sep | Peugeot Tour de Lerma | Spain | 48,000 | (Spain) Santiago Luna (1) |
| 16 Oct | Masters 13 | France | 45,000 | (France) Guillame Cambis (1) |
| 21 Oct | Sardinia Golf Open | Italy | 40,000 | (France) Guillame Cambis (2) |

== Order of Merit ==
The Order of Merit was based on tournament results during the season, calculated using a points-based system. The top five players on the Order of Merit (not otherwise exempt) earned status to play on the 2012 Challenge Tour.

| Position | Player | Points | Status earned |
|---|---|---|---|
| 1 | (France) Guillaume Cambis | 30,124 | Qualified for European Tour (Top 25 in Q School) |
| 2 | (England) Jason Barnes | 29,401 | Promoted to Challenge Tour |
| 3 | (England) Chris Paisley | 28,209 | Finished in Top 80 of Challenge Tour Rankings |
| 4 | (Italy) Marco Crespi | 24,736 | Promoted to Challenge Tour |
| 5 | (Scotland) Scott Henry | 21,818 | Promoted to Challenge Tour |
| 6 | (England) Farren Keenan | 18,393 | Promoted to Challenge Tour |
| 7 | (France) Romain Schneider | 17,277 | Promoted to Challenge Tour |
| 8 | (France) Xavier Poncelet | 17,085 | |
| 9 | (Norway) Jason Kelly | 13,953 | |
| 10 | (England) Jordan Gibb | 13,698 | Qualified for Challenge Tour (made cut in Q School) |
