= 2009 Alps Tour =

Golf tour season

2009 Alps Tour season
- Duration: 12 March 2009 – 25 October 2009
- Number of official events: 24
- Most wins: (Italy) Marco Crespi (2) (Italy) Andrea Perrino (2) (Italy) Paolo Terreni (2) (France) Julien Xanthopoulos (2)
- Order of Merit: (Italy) Andrea Perrino

The 2009 Alps Tour was the ninth season of the Alps Tour, a third-tier golf tour recognised by the European Tour.

== Schedule ==
The following table lists official events during the 2009 season.

Date	Tournament	Host country	Purse (€)	Winner (Note: The number in brackets after each winner's name is the number of Alps Tour events they had won up to and including that tournament. It is rare for someone to accumulate many wins on the Alps Tour as success at this level usually leads to promotion to the Challenge Tour.)
14 Mar	Peugeot Loewe Tour Escorpión	Spain	48,000	(Spain) José Manuel Lara (1)
27 Mar	Grande Finale Attijariwafabank	Morocco	40,000	(France) Édouard Dubois (1)
18 Apr	Peugeot Loewe Tour La Llorea	Spain	48,000	(Spain) Pedro Linhart (1)
27 Apr	Open di Puglia e Basilicata	Italy	45,000	(Italy) Paolo Terreni (1)
3 May	Gösser Open	Austria	40,000	(Switzerland) Claudio Blaesi (1)
10 May	Lyoness Open	Austria	60,000	(Austria) Uli Weinhandl (1)
17 May	Slovenian Golf Open	Slovenia	40,000	(Italy) Marco Crespi (2)
24 May	Open de Bordeaux	France	45,000	(France) Alexandre Mandonnet (2)
30 May	Masters 26 Dijon-Bourgogne	France	45,000	(France) Baptiste Chapellan (1)
7 Jun	Open du Haut Poitou	France	40,000	(France) Julien Xanthopoulos (2)
13 Jun	Peugeot Loewe Tour Laukariz	Spain	48,000	(Italy) Andrea Perrino (1)
19 Jun	Open Le Fonti	Italy	50,000	(England) Daniel Coughlan (1)
28 Jun	Allianz Open de Strasbourg	France	50,000	(Italy) Andrea Perrino (2)
11 Jul	Peugeot Loewe Tour Madrid	Spain	48,000	(Spain) Xavier Guzmán (1)
18 Jul	Circolo Rapallo Golf Open	Italy	50,000	(Netherlands) Joost Luiten (1)
25 Jul	Uniqa FinanceLife Open	Austria	45,000	(Italy) Paolo Terreni (2)
9 Aug	Omnium of Belgium	Belgium	45,000	(France) Benjamin Hébert (1)
30 Aug	Trophee Preven's	France	50,000	(France) Bruno-Teva Lecuona (3)
6 Sep	Open International de Normandie	France	50,000	(France) Damien Perrier (1)
13 Sep	Allianz Open Stade Français Paris	France	45,000	(France) Mike Lorenzo-Vera (4)
20 Sep	Open de la Mirabelle d'Or	France	45,000	(France) Julien Xanthopoulos (3)
3 Oct	Castelvolturno International Open	Italy	50,000	(England) Matthew Cryer (1)
10 Oct	Feudo d'Asti Golf Open	Italy	50,000	(Italy) Marco Crespi (3)
25 Oct	Masters 13	France	50,000	(France) Ghislain Rosier (1)

=== Unofficial events ===
The following events were sanctioned by the Alps Tour, but did not carry official money, nor were wins official.

Date	Tournament	Host country	Purse (€)	Winner
10 Dec	Samanah Masters	Morocco	70,000	(England) Daniel Brooks

== Order of Merit ==
The Order of Merit was based on tournament results during the season, calculated using a points-based system. The top five players on the Order of Merit earned status to play on the 2010 Challenge Tour.

Position	Player	Points	Status earned
1	(Italy) Andrea Perrino	48,285	Promoted to Challenge Tour
2	(England) Steve Lewton	33,860	Promoted to Challenge Tour
3	(France) Julien Xanthopoulos	33,735	Promoted to Challenge Tour
4	(France) Baptiste Chapellan	30,020	Promoted to Challenge Tour
5	(France) Fabien Marty	29,613	Promoted to Challenge Tour
6	(France) Édouard Dubois	27,491	
7	(France) Damien Perrier	27,407	
8	(France) Thomas Fournier	27,200	
9	(Austria) Uli Weinhandl	26,978	
10	(France) Bruno-Teva Lecuona	23,780	
