= 2012 Alps Tour =

Golf tour season

2012 Alps Tour season
- Duration: 8 February 2012 – 4 November 2012
- Number of official events: 19
- Most wins: (Republic of Ireland) Brendan McCarroll (2) (England) Jack Senior (2)
- Order of Merit: (Northern Ireland) Gareth Shaw

The 2012 Alps Tour was the 12th season of the Alps Tour, a third-tier golf tour recognised by the European Tour.

== Schedule ==
The following table lists official events during the 2012 season.

Date	Tournament	Host country	Purse (€)	Winner (Note: The number in brackets after each winner's name is the number of Alps Tour events they had won up to and including that tournament. It is rare for someone to accumulate many wins on the Alps Tour as success at this level usually leads to promotion to the Challenge Tour.)	Other tours (Note: FRA − French Tour.)
10 Feb	Open Palmeraie PGP	Morocco	30,000	(United States) Timothy O'Neal (1)	
16 Feb	Open Samanah	Morocco	30,000	(Italy) Matteo Delpodio (4)	
28 Apr	Peugeot Alps de Barcelona	Spain	48,000	(Spain) Pablo Larrazábal (1)	
12 May	Servizitalia Lignano Open	Italy	45,000	(England) Jack Senior (1)	
20 May	Gösser Open	Austria	40,000	(Republic of Ireland) Brendan McCarroll (1)	
26 May	LUMAR Slovenian Golf Open	Slovenia	40,000	(England) Chris McDonnell (1)	
3 Jun	Open de Saint François Guadeloupe	Guadeloupe	50,000	(England) Jack Senior (2)	
10 Jun	Casino Sanremo Open	Italy	40,000	(Republic of Ireland) Brendan McCarroll (2)	
16 Jun	Alps de Andalucía	Spain	48,000	(France) Jérôme Lando-Casanova (1)	
24 Jun	Open du Haut Poitou	France	40,000	(France) Sébastien Gros (1)	
1 Jul	Open de la Mirabelle d'Or	France	50,000	(France) Xavier Poncelet (1)	
8 Jul	Flory Van Donck Trophy	Belgium	45,000	(Belgium) Hugues Joannes (1)	
14 Jul	Montecchia Golf Open	Italy	40,000	(Scotland) Ross Kellett (1)	
21 Jul	Peugeot Tour Alps de Madrid	Spain	48,000	(Spain) Santiago Luna (2)	
31 Aug	Valle d'Aosta Open	Italy	50,000	(France) Thomas Fournier (2)	
16 Sep	Open International de Normandie	France	50,000	(France) Nicolas Joakimides (2)	
22 Sep	Internorm Dolomiti Golf Open	Italy	40,000	(Italy) Niccolo Quintarelli (1)	
20 Oct	Castellón Alps Comunidad Valencia	Spain	48,000	(Spain) Alfredo García-Heredia (1)	
4 Nov	Masters 13 Allianz	France	100,000	(France) Adrien Bernadet (1)	FRA

== Order of Merit ==
The Order of Merit was based on tournament results during the season, calculated using a points-based system. The top five players on the Order of Merit (not otherwise exempt) earned status to play on the 2013 Challenge Tour.

Position	Player	Points	Status earned
1	(Northern Ireland) Gareth Shaw	34,545	Promoted to Challenge Tour
2	(France) Thomas Fournier	24,188	Promoted to Challenge Tour
3	(England) Jack Senior	23,784	Finished in Top 70 of Challenge Tour Rankings
4	(France) Jérôme Lando-Casanova	22,252	Promoted to Challenge Tour
5	(Scotland) Ross Kellett	22,169	Promoted to Challenge Tour
6	(Italy) Niccolo Quintarelli	21,875	Promoted to Challenge Tour
7	(Republic of Ireland) Brendan McCarroll	21,847	
8	(France) Sébastien Gros	17,585	
9	(Spain) Jesús Legarrea	16,265	
10	(France) Thomas Linard	15,905	
