= Chris Paisley =

English golfer (born 1986)

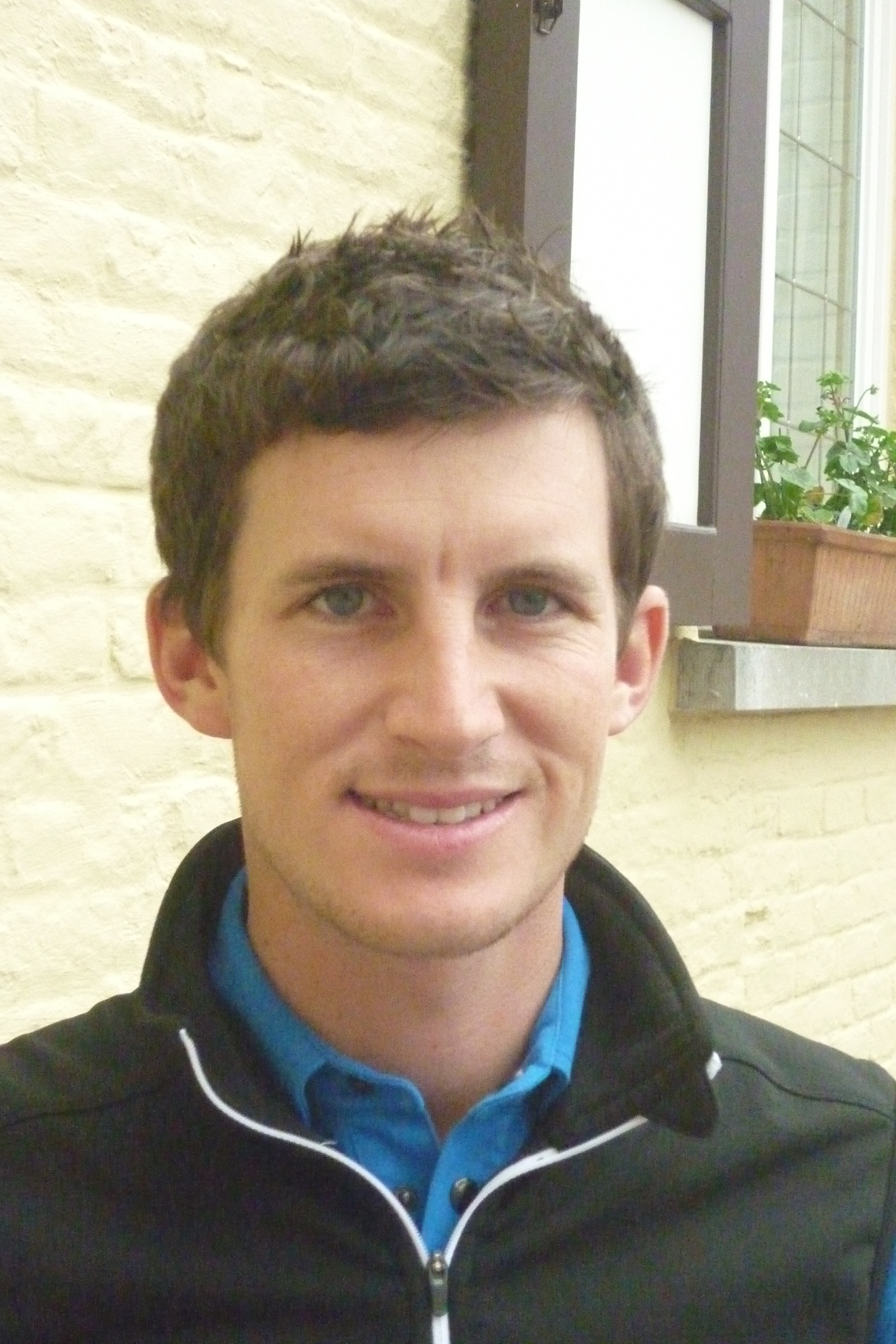
- Paisley in 2012

Personal information
- Full name: Christopher Samuel Paisley
- Nationality: England
- Born: 24 March 1986 (age 40) Hexham, Northumberland, England
- Height: 5 ft 8 in (1.73 m)
- Weight: 145 lb (66 kg; 10.4 st)

Career
- Sport: Golf
- College: University of Tennessee
- Turned professional: 2010
- Current tour: Challenge Tour
- Former tours: European Tour; Alps Tour
- Professional wins: 5
- Highest ranking: 78 (4 March 2018)

Number of wins by tour
- European Tour: 1
- Sunshine Tour: 1
- Challenge Tour: 1
- Other: 3

Christopher Samuel Paisley (born 24 March 1986) is an English professional golfer who currently plays on the Challenge Tour. In January 2018 he had his first win on the European Tour, the BMW SA Open.

== Amateur career ==
Paisley played college golf at the University of Tennessee where he won two events. He played on the St Andrews Trophy team in 2008, the Palmer Cup and Walker Cup teams in 2009. He turned professional in 2010.

== Professional career ==
Paisley won the first two events on the 2011 Alps Tour and started playing on the Challenge Tour the same year. In August he won his third Alps Tour event of the year. In 2012 he had his biggest success so far by winning the English Challenge. His performances on the Challenge Tour gave him a card for the 2013 European Tour season. He had limited success on the 2013 European Tour and returned to the Challenge Tour in 2014. He qualified again for the main tour through Q-School in late 2014.

Since 2015 Paisley has played mostly on the European Tour. He finished third place in the 2015 BMW International Open, the 2016 Italian Open and the 2017 Made in Denmark.

In January 2018, Paisley had his first European Tour victory by winning the BMW SA Open. The following week he finished fifth in the Abu Dhabi HSBC Championship, entering the world top-100 for the first time.

== Professional wins (5) ==
=== European Tour wins (1) ===
| No. | Date | Tournament | Winning score | Margin of victory | Runner-up |
|---|---|---|---|---|---|
| 1 | 14 Jan 2018 | BMW SA Open^{1} | −21 (66-65-70-66=267) | 3 strokes | (South Africa) Branden Grace |

^{1}Co-sanctioned by the Sunshine Tour

=== Challenge Tour wins (1) ===
| No. | Date | Tournament | Winning score | Margin of victory | Runner-up |
|---|---|---|---|---|---|
| 1 | 29 Jul 2012 | English Challenge | −16 (68-68-65-71=272) | 2 strokes | (England) Francis McGuirk |

=== Alps Tour wins (3) ===
| No. | Date | Tournament | Winning score | Margin of victory | Runner-up |
|---|---|---|---|---|---|
| 1 | 10 Mar 2011 | Peugeot Tour de Valencia | −14 (69-66-64=199) | 3 strokes | (Spain) Alfredo García-Heredia |
| 2 | 28 Apr 2011 | Peugeot Open de Catalunya | −14 (66-66-64=196) | 1 stroke | (Spain) Álvaro Velasco |
| 3 | 25 Aug 2011 | Styrian Mountain Golf Open | −11 (70-69-63=202) | Playoff | (Spain) Carlos Aguilar |

== Results in World Golf Championships ==
| Tournament | 2018 |
|---|---|
| Championship | T37 |
| Match Play | |
| Invitational | |
| Champions | |

Did not play

"T" = Tied

== Team appearances ==
Amateur

- St Andrews Trophy (representing Great Britain and Ireland): 2008 (winners)
- Palmer Cup (representing Europe): 2009 (winners)
- Walker Cup (representing Great Britain and Ireland): 2009
- European Amateur Team Championship (representing England): 2010 (winners)

== See also ==
- 2012 Challenge Tour graduates
- 2014 European Tour Qualifying School graduates
