= José-Filipe Lima =

Portuguese professional golfer

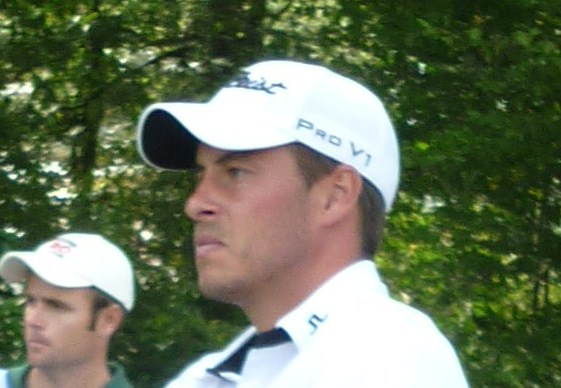
- Lima at the 2010 KLM Open

Personal information
- Nationality: France; Portugal (since 2005)
- Born: 26 November 1981 (age 44) Versailles, France
- Height: 5 ft 10 in (1.78 m)
- Weight: 172 lb (78 kg; 12.3 st)

Career
- Sport: Golf
- Turned professional: 2002
- Current tour: Challenge Tour
- Former tours: European Tour; Alps Tour
- Professional wins: 8

Number of wins by tour
- European Tour: 1
- Challenge Tour: 5 (Tied-8th all-time)
- Other: 3

Best results in major championships
- Masters Tournament: DNP
- PGA Championship: DNP
- U.S. Open: CUT: 2005
- The Open Championship: T70: 2008

Achievements and awards
- Danish Golf Tour Order of Merit winner: 2009
Medal record
Mediterranean Games
Gold medal – first place	2001 Tunis	Individual
Gold medal – first place	2001 Tunis	Men's team

José-Filipe Lima (born Philippe Lima; November 26, 1981) is a French-Portuguese professional golfer. He won the 2004 Aa St Omer Open to gain a place on the European Tour. His best seasons were from 2005 to 2007 when he finished in the top-100 on the European Tour Order of Merit. Successful Challenge Tour seasons in 2009, 2013 and 2016 have promoted him back to the European Tour but, on each occasion he has failed to retain his place on the tour. He was runner-up in the 2007 BMW International Open.

== Early life and amateur career ==
Lima has Portuguese parents but was born in Versailles, France and grew up mainly in France. His father worked at Saint-Nom-La-Bretèche, which was the host course of the Trophée Lancôme until that tournament ceased in 2003, and was his son's first coach. Lima was the top ranked French amateur at the end of 2001.

His parents come from the Póvoa de Varzim parish of Aguçadoura.

== Professional career ==
In 2003, Lima was the fourth ranked player on the third-level Alps Tour, which qualified him to move up to the main developmental tour in Europe, the Challenge Tour, for the 2004 season. In back to back weeks in June 2004 he won the Challenge Tour's Segura Viudas Challenge de España and the Challenge Tour/European Tour co-sanctioned Aa St Omer Open, which won him promotion to the European Tour.

Up until the end of 2004 Lima represented France (as Philippe Lima) but he then adopted his parents' nationality, began to use the Portuguese form of his name professionally, and represented Portugal in that year's WGC-World Cup.

After his win in the Aa St Omer Open, Lima played on the European Tour until the end of the 2008 season, his best finish being joint runner-up in the 2007 BMW International Open. After a disappointing 2008 he lost his tour card and in 2009 played mostly Challenge Tour events. He won the ECCO Tour Championship and was runner-up in the Saint-Omer Open and the Allianz Open du Grand Toulouse to finish second in the Order of Merit and a return to the European Tour. 2010 was another poor season with no top-10 finishes.

Lima returned to the Challenge Tour where he played in 2011, 2012 and 2013. He did not win any tournaments in 2013 but with three runner-up finishes, in the Mugello Tuscany Open, the Finnish Challenge and the Dubai Festival City Challenge Tour Grand Final, as well as two third-places and a fourth-place, he again finished second in the Order of Merit. His 2014 European Tour season was no more successful than 2010 and he again returned to the Challenge Tour.

After an unsuccessful 2015 on the Challenge Tour, Lima won the 2016 Najeti Open and was runner-up in the Ras Al Khaimah Golf Challenge to finish 12th in the Order or Merit and gain promotion to the European Tour for the fourth time. However he again failed to find any success on the main tour in 2017 and returned again to the Challenge Tour for 2018. He was runner-up in the 2018 Open de Portugal and finished the season 26th in the Order of Merit. After a poor start to 2019, Lima was joint runner-up in the Euram Bank Open behind Calum Hill in July and won the Vierumäki Finnish Challenge two weeks later.

== Amateur wins ==
- 2001 Coupe Murat (French Open Amateur Stroke Play Championship)

== Professional wins (8) ==
=== European Tour wins (1) ===
No.	Date	Tournament	Winning score	Margin of victory	Runner-up
1	20 Jun 2004	Aa St Omer Open^{1}	−5 (71-71-71-66=279)	1 stroke	(Italy) Alessandro Tadini

^{1}Dual-ranking event with the Challenge Tour

=== Challenge Tour wins (5) ===
No.	Date	Tournament	Winning score	Margin of victory	Runner(s)-up
1	13 Jun 2004	Segura Viudas Challenge de España	−14 (73-67-67-67=274)	Playoff	(Italy) Alessandro Napoleoni
2	20 Jun 2004	Aa St Omer Open^{1}	−5 (71-71-71-66=279)	1 stroke	(Italy) Alessandro Tadini
3	4 Oct 2009	ECCO Tour Championship^{2}	−5 (70-69-72=211) (Note: Shortened to 54 holes due to weather.)	1 stroke	(Italy) Edoardo Molinari
4	19 Jun 2016	Najeti Open (2)	−9 (66-70-71-68=275)	2 strokes	(Belgium) Thomas Detry, (Italy) Alessandro Tadini
5	4 Aug 2019	Vierumäki Finnish Challenge	−14 (68-70-70-66=274)	1 stroke	(South Africa) Bryce Easton

^{1}Dual-ranking event with the European Tour
^{2}Co-sanctioned by the Nordic Golf League

Challenge Tour playoff record (1–0)

No.	Year	Tournament	Opponent	Result
1	2004	Segura Viudas Challenge de España	(Italy) Alessandro Napoleoni	Won with birdie on first extra hole

=== Alps Tour wins (2) ===
No.	Date	Tournament	Winning score	Margin of victory	Runner-up
1	17 Oct 2004	Masters 13	−15 (66-68-70-69=273)	1 stroke	(Italy) Andrea Maestroni
2	9 Oct 2005	Masters 13 (2)	−14 (67-70-71-66=274)	3 strokes	(Spain) Francisco Valera

=== Other wins (1) ===
- 2001 Mediterranean Games (as an amateur)

== Results in major championships ==
Tournament	2005	2006	2007	2008
U.S. Open	CUT			
The Open Championship			CUT	T70

Note: Lima never played in the Masters Tournament or the PGA Championship.

Did not play

CUT = missed the half-way cut
"T" = tied

== Team appearances ==
Amateur

- European Boys' Team Championship (representing France): 1999
- European Amateur Team Championship (representing France): 2001
- European Youths' Team Championship (representing France): 2002
- St Andrews Trophy (representing the Continent of Europe): 2002

Professional

- World Cup (representing Portugal): 2005, 2013, 2016
- European Championships (representing Portugal): 2018

== See also ==
- 2009 Challenge Tour graduates
- 2013 Challenge Tour graduates
- 2016 Challenge Tour graduates
- List of golfers with most Challenge Tour wins
