= Matteo Delpodio =

Italian professional golfer (born 1985)

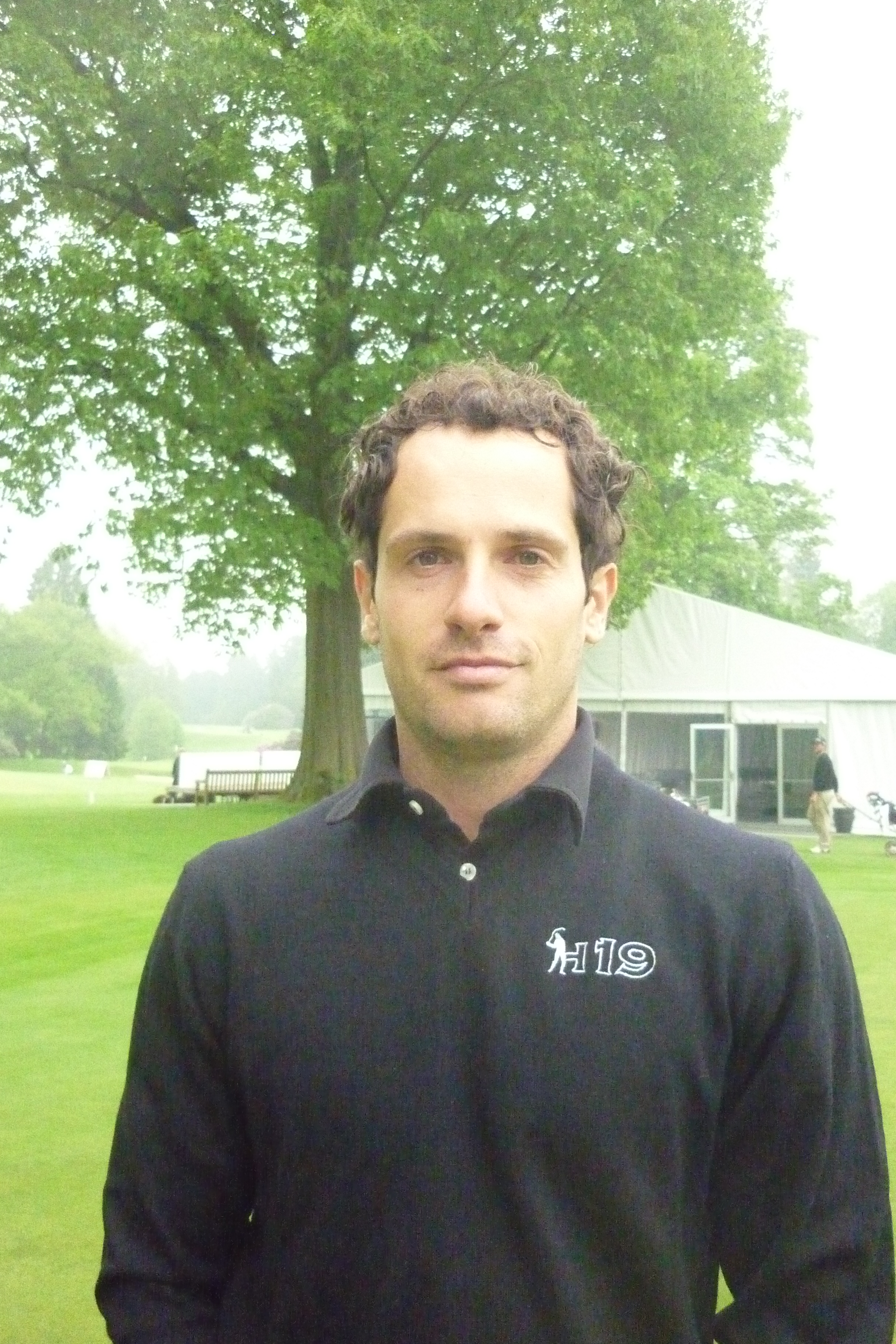

Personal information
- Nationality: Italy
- Born: 23 June 1985 (age 41) Turin, Italy
- Height: 1.80 m (5 ft 11 in)
- Weight: 75 kg (165 lb; 11.8 st)

Career
- Sport: Golf
- Turned professional: 2006
- Current tour: Challenge Tour
- Former tours: European Tour; Alps Tour
- Professional wins: 5

Number of wins by tour
- Challenge Tour: 1
- Other: 4

Achievements and awards
- Alps Tour Order of Merit winner: 2010

Matteo Delpodio (born 23 June 1985) is an Italian professional golfer.

Delpodio was born in Turin, Italy. In amateur golf, he won several national championships before turning professional in 2006.

Delpodio played on the Alps Tour from 2007 to 2010. He won three tournaments and the Order of Merit in 2010. This earned him a spot on the Challenge Tour for 2011.

Delpodio played the Challenge Tour in 2009, 2011–12, 2014–15. He picked up his first win at the 2015 EMC Challenge Open.

Delpodio played the European Tour in 2013 after successfully completing Qualifying School. His best finish was T-8 at the Open de España.

== Amateur wins ==
- 2003 Italian Amateur Match Play Championship, Italian Junior Championship
- 2005 Italian Amateur Foursome Championship
- 2006 Italian Amateur Match Play Championship

== Professional wins (5) ==
=== Challenge Tour wins (1) ===
No.	Date	Tournament	Winning score	Margin of victory	Runner-up
1	9 Mar 2015	EMC Challenge Open	−5 (69-68-71-71=279)	3 strokes	(England) Gary Boyd

=== Alps Tour wins (4) ===
No.	Date	Tournament	Winning score	Margin of victory	Runner(s)-up
1	13 Mar 2010	Peugeot Tour Escorpión	−11 (66-69-67=202)	1 stroke	(Spain) Jordi García del Moral
2	20 Jun 2010	Open International de Normandie	−13 (67-67-70-67=271)	4 strokes	(France) Julien Forêt, (England) Jason Palmer
3	17 Oct 2010	Masters 13	−9 (69-68-69-73=279)	1 stroke	(England) Jason Barnes
4	16 Feb 2012	Open Samanah	−5 (71-71-69=211)	1 stroke	(France) Sébastien Gros

== Team appearances ==
Amateur

- Junior Ryder Cup (representing Europe): 2002 (winners)
- Jacques Léglise Trophy (representing the Continent of Europe): 2003
- Eisenhower Trophy (representing Italy): 2004, 2006
- European Amateur Team Championship (representing Italy): 2005
- European Youths' Team Championship (representing Italy): 2006
- St Andrews Trophy (representing the Continent of Europe): 2006

== See also ==
- 2012 European Tour Qualifying School graduates
