= Alps Tour =

Professional golf tour

- Current season, competition or edition: 2026 Alps Tour
- Sport: Golf
- Founded: 2001
- First season: 2001
- Countries: Based in Continental Europe (Note: Schedules have also included events in Egypt, Guadeloupe, Israel, Morocco, Réunion and Tunisia.)
- Most titles: Tournament wins: (Italy) Marco Crespi (6) (Italy) Andrea Romano (6) (England) Matt Wallace (6)
- Website: https://alpstourgolf.com/#/

The Alps Tour is a developmental professional golf tour for men which is sanctioned by the national golf associations of France, Italy, Austria and Switzerland.

== History ==
Established in 2001, it is a third level tour, the highest level of men's golf in Europe being the European Tour, and the second level being the Challenge Tour. Other third level tours in Europe include the United Kingdom-based Tartan Pro Tour and Clutch Pro Tour, the Germany-based Pro Golf Tour, and the Nordic League in the Nordic countries. Beginning in July 2015, the four third-level tours will carry Official World Golf Ranking points.

Like the other third-tier European tours, the top ten players on the Order of Merit are exempt through the second stage of European Tour Qualifying School and the top five non-exempt players earn Challenge Tour cards.

Alumni who have gone on to win on the European Tour include Marco Crespi, Guido Migliozzi, Chris Paisley, Julien Quesne and Matt Wallace.

== Order of Merit winners ==
Year	Winner	Points
2026	(France) Alexandre Vandermoten	43,421
2025	(Spain) Javier Barcos	38,699
2024	(France) Benjamin Kédochim	28,119
2023	(Republic of Ireland) Ronan Mullarney	25,714
2022	(Italy) Gregorio De Leo	39,936
2021	(Italy) Jacopo Vecchi Fossa	28,050
2020	(Spain) Jordi García del Moral	18,503
2019	(Italy) Edoardo Lipparelli	36,667
2018	(Spain) Santiago Tarrío	26,702
2017	(Spain) Adri Arnaus	26,214
2016	(England) Matt Wallace	49,703
2015	(Netherlands) Darius van Driel	35,860
2014	(Italy) Nino Bertasio	31,994
2013	(England) Jason Palmer	36,660
2012	(Northern Ireland) Gareth Shaw	34,545
2011	(France) Guillaume Cambis	30,124
2010	(Italy) Matteo Delpodio	44,632
2009	(Italy) Andrea Perrino	48,285
2008	(France) Julien Grillon	40,530
2007	(France) Julien Quesne	37,716
2006	(France) François Calmels	32,818
2005	(France) Cédric Menut	38,931
2004	(Italy) Andrea Maestroni	28,335
Year	Winner	Prize money (€)
2003	(Italy) Emmanuele Lattanzi	25,857
2002	(Italy) Alessandro Napoleoni	28,022
2001	(Italy) Stefano Reale	23,332
