= European Tour Qualifying School =

Golf tournament in Spain

European Tour Qualifying School Final Stage
Tournament information
- Location: Tarragona, Spain
- Established: 1976
- Courses: Infinitum Golf (Lakes & Hills Courses)
- Par: 71 (L); 72 (H)
- Length: 7,001 yards (6,402 m); 6,956 yards (6,361 m)
- Tours: European Tour (unofficial event)
- Format: Stroke play
- Prize fund: €120,000
- Month played: November

Tournament record score
- Aggregate: 391 Zander Lombard (2025)
- To par: −37 as above

Current champion
- (Spain) Rocco Repetto

Location map
- Location in Spain Location in Catalonia

The European Tour Qualifying School is an annual golf tournament which enables professional golfers to gain a place on the European Tour and its official development tour, the Challenge Tour.

The European Tour Qualifying School is held in three stages, with the final stage being played over six rounds at Infinitum Golf (formerly the Lumine Golf Club) in Spain. After four rounds, the field is reduced from 156 to 70 plus ties. From 2024, the top 20 (previously top 25) players including ties win their card on the European Tour. The remaining players who make the 72-hole cut are fully exempt on the Challenge Tour.

== Winners ==
Year	Winner	Score	To par	Margin of victory	Runner(s)-up	Venue(s)	Ref.
2026	(Spain) Rocco Repetto	396	−32	Countback	(Spain) Josele Ballester	Infinitum Golf	
2025	(South Africa) Zander Lombard	391	−37	13 strokes	(Canada) Aaron Cockerill (Australia) Connor McKinney (India) Shubhankar Sharma	Infinitum Golf	
2024	(Italy) Edoardo Molinari	399	−29	1 stroke	(Sweden) Niklas Lemke	Infinitum Golf	
2023	(Germany) Freddy Schott	401	−27	2 strokes	(Italy) Filippo Celli	Infinitum Golf	
2022	(Sweden) Simon Forsström	399	−29	2 strokes	(France) David Ravetto	Infinitum Golf	
2020–21: Cancelled due to the COVID-19 pandemic							
2019	(Denmark) Benjamin Poke	403	−25	6 strokes	(France) Grégory Havret	Lumine GC	
2018	(Spain) Alejandro Cañizares	404	−24	Countback	(South Africa) Zander Lombard	Lumine GC	
2017	(England) Sam Horsfield	401	−27	7 strokes	(England) Charlie Ford (Denmark) Anders Hansen (South Africa) Jacques Kruyswijk (Italy) Andrea Pavan (Sweden) Pontus Widegren (Denmark) Jeff Winther	Lumine GC	
2016	(England) Nathan Kimsey	415	−13	1 stroke	(Argentina) Ricardo González (Scotland) Scott Henry (Italy) Edoardo Molinari	PGA Golf Catalunya	
2015	(South Africa) Ulrich van den Berg	410	−18	Countback	(United States) Daniel Im (Spain) Adrián Otaegui	PGA Golf Catalunya	
2014	(Finland) Mikko Korhonen	408	−20	2 strokes	(Argentina) Ricardo González	PGA Golf Catalunya	
2013	(Spain) Carlos del Moral	402	−26	5 strokes	(Paraguay) Fabrizio Zanotti	PGA Golf Catalunya	
2012	(England) John Parry	409	−19	4 strokes	(Sweden) Mikael Lundberg	PGA Golf Catalunya	
2011	(England) David Dixon	407	−21	1 stroke	(England) Sam Hutsby	PGA Golf Catalunya	
2010	(England) Simon Wakefield	407	−21	2 strokes	(Spain) Carlos del Moral	PGA Golf Catalunya	
2009	(England) Simon Khan	408	−20	1 stroke	(England) Sam Hutsby	PGA Golf Catalunya	
2008	(Sweden) Oskar Henningsson	409	−19	4 strokes	(Spain) Carlos del Moral (Australia) Wade Ormsby	PGA Golf Catalunya	
2007	(Austria) Martin Wiegele	421	−11	2 strokes	(Spain) Pedro Linhart (England) Lee Slattery	San Roque Club	
2006	(Spain) Carlos Rodiles	417	−15	Countback	(Brazil) Alexandre Rocha	San Roque Club	
2005	(England) Tom Whitehouse	419	−13	2 strokes	(England) Robert Rock	San Roque Club	
2004	(Sweden) Peter Gustafsson	423	−9	3 strokes	(England) Simon Wakefield	San Roque Club	
2003	(England) Richard McEvoy	400	−28	3 strokes	(Australia) Wade Ormsby	Empordà Golf; Golf Platja de Pals	
2002	(Sweden) Per Nyman	400	−28	1 stroke	(England) Phillip Archer	Empordà Golf; Golf Platja de Pals	
2001	(Sweden) Johan Sköld	415	−17	2 strokes	(France) Christophe Pottier	San Roque Club; Club de Golf Sotogrande	
2000	(South Africa) Desvonde Botes	417	−15	4 strokes	(Scotland) Graham Rankin	San Roque Club; Club de Golf Sotogrande	
1999	(Scotland) Alastair Forsyth	423	−9	2 strokes	(Sweden) Niclas Fasth	San Roque Club; Club de Golf Sotogrande	
1998	(Scotland) Ross Drummond	425	−7	Countback	(Sweden) Henrik Nyström	San Roque Club; Club de Golf Sotogrande	
1997	(Netherlands) Chris van der Velde	280 (Note: Shortened to 72 holes due to rain.)	−8	Countback	(Netherlands) Robert-Jan Derksen (England) Philip Golding (Sweden) Fredrik Henge	San Roque Club; Guadalmina	
1996	(Sweden) Niclas Fasth	428	−4	1 stroke	(England) Brian Davis	San Roque Club; Club de Golf Sotogrande	
1995	(England) Steve Webster	422	−8	1 stroke	(South Africa) Hendrik Buhrmann	San Roque Club; Guadalmina	
1994	(England) David Carter	273 (Note: Shortened to 72 holes due to rain.)	−15	5 strokes	(France) Christian Cévaër	La Grande Motte; Golf Massane	
1993	(United States) Brian Nelson	424	−8	2 strokes	(England) Ross McFarlane (England) Scott Watson	La Grande Motte; Golf Massane	
1992	(South Africa) Retief Goosen	427	−5	1 stroke	(Denmark) Ole Eskildsen	La Grande Motte; Golf Massane	
1991	(England) Andrew Hare	429	−3	2 strokes	(Argentina) José Cóceres (England) Gary Evans (Republic of Ireland) Paul McGinley	La Grande Motte; Golf Massane	
1990	(Portugal) Daniel Silva	424	−8	6 strokes	(Spain) Juan Anglada (Wales) Phillip Price	La Grande Motte; Golf Massane	
1989	(West Germany) Heinz-Peter Thül	411	−19	3 strokes	(England) David Ray	La Manga Club	
1988	(Sweden) Jesper Parnevik	416	−14	4 strokes	(Wales) Paul Mayo (Sweden) Ulf Nilsson (Fiji) Vijay Singh	La Manga Club	
1987	(United States) Mike Smith	410	−20	3 strokes	(United States) John DeForest	La Manga Club	
1986	(Australia) Wayne Smith	415	−15	1 stroke	(South Africa) Justin Hobday (Denmark) Steen Tinning	La Manga Club	
1985	(Spain) José María Olazábal	414	−16	2 strokes	(New Zealand) Greg Turner	La Manga Club	
1984	(United States) Robert Wrenn	412	−18	1 stroke	(United States) Jeff Sluman	La Manga Club	
1983	(England) David Ray	281	−5	2 strokes	(United States) Mike Wolseley	La Manga Club	
1982	(Spain) José Rivero	283	−3	7 strokes	(England) Robert Lee (England) Malcolm MacKenzie	La Manga Club	
1981	(Scotland) Gordon Brand Jnr	288	E	3 strokes	(England) Roger Chapman	Dom Pedro	
1981	(England) Robin Mann	294	+6	1 stroke	(England) Philip Morley	Quinta do Lago	
1980	(England) Paul Carrigill	295	+7	3 strokes	(England) John Hoskisson	Dom Pedro	
1980	(Spain) Manuel Montes	293	+5	9 strokes	(England) Keith Ashdown (England) Malcolm MacKenzie (England) Bob Wynn	Quinta do Lago	
1979	(England) Charles Cox	296	+8	2 strokes	(England) Andrew Murray	Dom Pedro	
1979	(England) Keith Williams	303	+15	3 strokes	(Republic of Ireland) Joe Purcell (England) Mark Thomas	Quinta do Lago	
1978	(England) Stephen Evans	293	+2	Countback	(England) Glenn Ralph	Foxhills; Downshire	
1977	(Scotland) Sandy Lyle	295	+3	2 strokes	(England) Malcolm Henberry	Foxhills	
1976	(England) David A. Russell	295	+5	3 strokes	(England) Philip Loxley	Foxhills; Walton Heath	
