= Gardagolf Country Club =

Golf course in Soiano del Lago, Brescia, Italy

Coordinates: 41°50′54″N 12°32′19″E

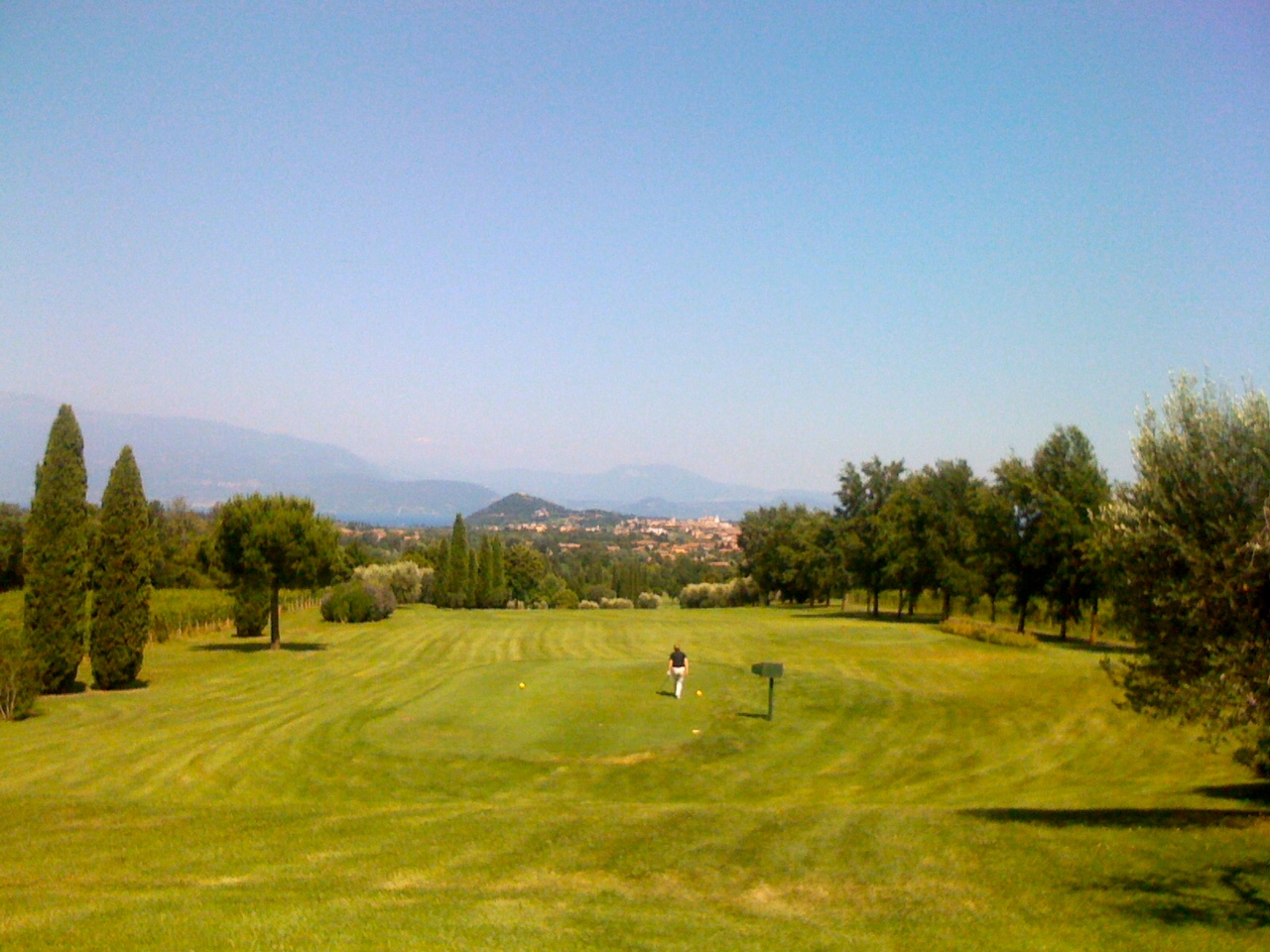
- 5th hole, Red Course
- Interactive map of Gardagolf Country Club

Club information
- Location: Soiano del Lago, Brescia, Italy
- Established: 1986
- Total holes: 27
- Tournaments: Italian Open, Ladies Italian Open, Kronenbourg Open, Texbond Open
- Website: gardagolf.it
- Designed by: Cotton, Pennick, Steel & Partners
- Par: 72
- Course record: 64 - Bernhard Langer (1997 Italian Open)

The Gardagolf Country Club is an Italian golf course located in Soiano del Lago, but the playing field also occupies with the municipalities of Polpenazze del Garda and Manerba del Garda; close to the Lake Garda in the Province of Brescia.

The first 18 holes (Red and White Course) designed by Cotton, Pennick, Steel & Partners were inaugurated on the 28th of June 1986, while the Yellow Course was added in 1990. The club hosted the Italian Open three times in 1997, 2003 and 2018, the Kronenbourg Open in 1993, and the Ladies Italian Open in 1990.

On 12 December 2017 the Italian Federation announced that Gardagolf would host the Italian Open (this time a Rolex Series event) in 2018 for the third time.

Gardagolf is the home club of the 4 times European Tour winner Matteo Manassero where he started playing the game as a kid with the club pro Franco Maestroni. Nino Bertasio and Challenge Tour player Andrea Maestroni also play for Gardagolf.

== Italian Open ==
The 1997 Italian Open will be remembered for the final head to head between Bernhard Langer and José María Olazábal: they arrived tied at the uphill 18th hole when the Spaniard hooked the driver, hit the big tree on the left and ended up losing the tournament. Since then, that tree is referred to by many members as the Olazábal Tree. Langer closed the tournament with a final 64 which is currently the course record.

The 2003 Italian Open marked the last appearance in the competition for Severiano Ballesteros.

Year	Winner	Score
Open d'Italia
2018	(Denmark) Thorbjørn Olesen	262 (-22)
Italian Open Telecom Italia
2003	(Sweden) Mathias Grönberg	271 (−17)
Conte of Florence Italian Open
1997	(Germany) Bernhard Langer	273 (−15)

== Kronenbourg Open ==
Year	Winner
1993	(Scotland) Sam Torrance

== Ladies Italian Open ==
Year	Winner
1990	(Belgium) Florence Descampe

== Texbond Open ==
Year	Winner	Country	Score
2006	Carlos del Moral	Spain	270
2005	Fredrik Widmark	Sweden	269
2004	Sam Little	England	269
