= Madrid Masters =

There are two sporting events named the Madrid Masters:

- Madrid Open (tennis) – a men's and women's tennis tournament
- Madrid Masters (golf)
