= 2013 European Tour Qualifying School graduates =

This is a list of the 27 players who earned their 2014 European Tour card through Q School in 2013.

Place	Player	European Tour starts	Cuts made	Notes
1	(Spain) Carlos del Moral	128	61	2 Challenge Tour wins
2	(Paraguay) Fabrizio Zanotti	164	82	1 Challenge Tour win
3	(Italy) Marco Crespi	16	5	2 Challenge Tour wins
4	(France) Gary Stal	13	7	2 Challenge Tour wins
T5	(Sweden) Mikael Lundberg	260	119	2 European Tour wins
T5	(France) Adrien Saddier	1	0	
T5	(United States) John Hahn	1	1	
T8	(United States) Connor Arendell	0	0	
T8	(Australia) Wade Ormsby	173	84	1 Asian Tour win
T8	(Wales) Stuart Manley	123	44	1 Challenge Tour win
T8	(England) James Morrison	124	62	1 European Tour win
T12	(England) James Heath	56	18	1 Challenge Tour win
T12	(England) Simon Wakefield	316	157	1 Challenge Tour win, 1 Sunshine Tour win
T12	(Sweden) Jens Dantorp	4	4	1 Challenge Tour win
T12	(United States) Brinson Paolini	0	0	1 Challenge Tour win
T12	(Sweden) Patrik Sjöland	352	201	2 European Tour wins
T17	(Republic of Ireland) Kevin Phelan	5	1	
T17	(Denmark) Andreas Hartø	57	24	3 Challenge Tour wins
T17	(England) Daniel Brooks	26	7	
T17	(Belgium) Thomas Pieters	3	2	
T17	(Denmark) Lucas Bjerregaard	1	1	
T22	(United States) Jason Knutzon	89	48	2 Asian Tour wins
T22	(Finland) Mikko Korhonen	47	32	
T22	(Argentina) Estanislao Goya	137	73	1 European Tour wins
T22	(Scotland) Jack Doherty	8	1	
T22	(England) Adam Gee	30	12	
T22	(Scotland) Alastair Forsyth	355	227	2 European Tour wins

2014 European Tour rookie

== 2014 Results ==
Player	Starts	Cuts made	Best finish	Money list rank	Earnings (€)
(Spain) Carlos del Moral	29	14	4	113	217,778
(Paraguay) Fabrizio Zanotti	27	18	Win	38	1,046,154
(Italy) Marco Crespi*	26	12	Win	105	241,717
(France) Gary Stal	25	21	T8	89	294,998
(Sweden) Mikael Lundberg	24	12	Win	96	269,690
(France) Adrien Saddier*	27	15	T6	127	176,547
(United States) John Hahn*	22	12	T3	120	197,124
(United States) Connor Arendell*	13	3	T20	219	19,073
(Australia) Wade Ormsby	28	22	T4	51	790,559
(Wales) Stuart Manley	29	12	T2	125	182,305
(England) James Morrison	28	21	T4	88	302,098
(England) James Heath	23	13	T9	151	111,257
(England) Simon Wakefield	26	11	T7	142	135,575
(Sweden) Jens Dantorp*	23	9	T16	154	85,408
(United States) Brinson Paolini*	23	5	T12	177	50,103
(Sweden) Patrik Sjöland	17	9	T26	168	61,957
(Republic of Ireland) Kevin Phelan*	26	10	3	129	174,382
(Denmark) Andreas Hartø	26	6	T7	163	73,299
(England) Daniel Brooks	24	10	Win	140	138,641
(Belgium) Thomas Pieters*	27	10	T2	83	332,371
(Denmark) Lucas Bjerregaard*	26	17	T4	90	291,549
(United States) Jason Knutzon	21	14	T13	149	119,040
(Finland) Mikko Korhonen	21	13	T12	128	174,775
(Argentina) Estanislao Goya	21	12	T18	141	136,954
(Scotland) Jack Doherty*	22	11	T32	175	51,630
(England) Adam Gee	23	13	T12	150	117,527
(Scotland) Alastair Forsyth	24	10	T23	157	83,020

* European Tour rookie in 2014
T = Tied
The player retained his European Tour card for 2016 (finished inside the top 110, or won).
The player did not retain his European Tour card for 2016, but retained conditional status (finished between 111 and 147).
The player did not retain his European Tour card for 2015 (finished outside the top 147).

Korhonen regained his card for 2015 through Q School.

== Winners on the European Tour in 2014 ==
No.	Date	Player	Tournament	Winning score	Margin of victory	Runner(s)-up
1	6 Apr	(Italy) Marco Crespi	NH Collection Open	−10 (70-73-66-69=278)	2 strokes	(Spain) Jordi García Pinto (Scotland) Richie Ramsay
2	11 May	(England) Daniel Brooks	Madeira Islands Open - Portugal - BPI	−9 (68-67=135)^{1}	Playoff	(Scotland) Scott Henry
3	8 Jun	(Sweden) Mikael Lundberg	Lyoness Open	−12 (67-68-76-65=276)	Playoff	(Austria) Bernd Wiesberger
4	29 Jun	(Paraguay) Fabrizio Zanotti	BMW International Open	−19 (72-67-65-65=269)	Playoff	(Spain) Rafa Cabrera-Bello (France) Grégory Havret (Sweden) Henrik Stenson

^{1} Event shortened to 36 holes due to poor weather

== Runners-up on the European Tour in 2014 ==
No.	Date	Player	Tournament	Winner	Winning score	Runner-up score
1	8 Dec 2013	(Wales) Stuart Manley lost in three-man playoff	Hong Kong Open	(Spain) Miguel Ángel Jiménez	−12 (70-67-65-66=268)	−12 (67-67-66-68=268)
2	18 May	(Belgium) Thomas Pieters lost in three-man playoff	Open de España	(Spain) Miguel Ángel Jiménez	−4 (69-73-69-73=284)	−4 (69-69-71-75=284)

== See also ==
- 2013 Challenge Tour graduates
- 2014 European Tour
