= Mads Vibe-Hastrup =

Danish professional golfer (born 1978)

Personal information
- Full name: Mads Vibe-Hastrup
- Nationality: Denmark
- Born: 20 November 1978 (age 47) Helsingør, Denmark
- Height: 1.83 m (6 ft 0 in)

Career
- Sport: Golf
- Turned professional: 1999
- Former tours: European Tour; Challenge Tour
- Professional wins: 5

Number of wins by tour
- European Tour: 1
- Challenge Tour: 1
- Other: 3

Achievements and awards
- Nordic Golf League Order of Merit winner: 2001

Mads Vibe-Hastrup (born 20 November 1978) is a Danish professional golfer.

== Early life ==
Vibe-Hastrup was born in Helsingør.

== Professional career ==
In 1999, Vibe-Hastrup turned professional. Vibe-Hastrup qualified for the European Tour after finishing 11th on the 2001 Challenge Tour rankings. Since then he has struggled to establish himself on the elite tour, regaining his card for the 2003 and 2007 seasons at qualifying school, and returning to the second tier Challenge Tour in 2006.

Vibe-Hastrup has only broken into the top 100 on the European Tour Order of Merit on one occasion, in 2007, when he finished in 61st place. That same season, he won his first tournament on the European Tour at the 2007 Open de Madrid Valle Romano, which granted him a two-year exemption on the tour, and finished runner-up in the Celtic Manor Wales Open. He was unable to maintain that form into 2008, making only seven cuts as he slipped to 177th on the money list. He lost his card in 2009 and returned to the Challenge Tour.

== Amateur wins ==
- 1996 Doug Sanders World Boys Championship

== Professional wins (5) ==
=== European Tour wins (1) ===
No.	Date	Tournament	Winning score	Margin of victory	Runner-up
1	14 Oct 2007	Open de Madrid Valle Romano	−16 (69-69-67-67=272)	3 strokes	(Spain) Alejandro Cañizares

=== Challenge Tour wins (1) ===
No.	Date	Tournament	Winning score	Margin of victory	Runners-up
1	6 Oct 2001	San Paolo Vita & Asset Management Open	−21 (65-68-69-65=267)	1 stroke	(Italy) Alberto Binaghi, (Sweden) Pehr Magnebrant

Challenge Tour playoff record (0–1)

No.	Year	Tournament	Opponent	Result
1	2001	Volvo Finnish Open	(Sweden) Peter Hedblom	Lost to birdie on fourth extra hole

=== Nordic Golf League wins (3) ===
No.	Date	Tournament	Winning score	Margin of victory	Runner-up
1	13 May 2001	Sola Open	−6 (68-70=138)	3 strokes	(Sweden) Christian Nilsson
2	27 May 2001	Audi Open	−9 (66-69=135)	2 strokes	(Sweden) Fredrik Widmark
3	8 Jul 2001	Wilson Rebild Open	−7 (67-74-68=209)	7 strokes	(Denmark) Anders Bøgebjerg

== Team appearances ==
Amateur

- European Boys' Team Championship (representing Denmark): 1995, 1996
- Eisenhower Trophy (representing Denmark): 1996, 1998
- European Amateur Team Championship (representing Denmark): 1997
- Jacques Léglise Trophy (representing the Continent of Europe): 1995, 1996 (winners)

== See also ==
- 2006 Challenge Tour graduates
