= 2007 Swedish Golf Tour =

Golf tour season

2007 Swedish Golf Tour season
- Duration: 11 May 2007 – 30 September 2007
- Number of official events: 14
- Order of Merit: (Sweden) Rikard Karlberg

The 2007 Swedish Golf Tour, titled as the 2007 Telia Tour for sponsorship reasons, was the 24th season of the Swedish Golf Tour, the main professional golf tour in Sweden since it was formed in 1984, with most tournaments being incorporated into the Nordic Golf League since 1999.

== Schedule ==
The following table lists official events during the 2007 season.

Date	Tournament	Location	Purse (SKr)	Winner (Note: The number in brackets after each winner's name is the number of Swedish Golf Tour events they had won up to and including that tournament. As most Swedish Golf Tour events are incorporated into the Nordic Golf League or Challenge Tour schedules, details of these wins are displayed there instead.)	Main tour (Note: CHA − Challenge Tour; NGL − Nordic Golf League.)
13 May	St Ibb Open	Skåne	250,000	(Sweden) Rikard Karlberg	NGL
18 May	Gambro Open	Skåne	200,000	(Sweden) Ludwig Nordeklint	NGL
27 May	PayEx Masters	Norway	€25,000	(Sweden) Tony Edlund	NGL
3 Jun	Kinnaborg Open	Västergötland	200,000	(Sweden) Daniel Lindgren	NGL
10 Jun	Telia Open	Södermanland	275,000	(Sweden) Joakim Rask	NGL
17 Jun	Husqvarna Open	Småland	500,000	(Sweden) Johan Wahlqvist	NGL
8 Jul	Skåne Open	Skåne	250,000	(Norway) Christian Aronsen	NGL
29 Jul	Hansabanka Baltic Open	Latvia	€55,000	(Sweden) Andreas Högberg	NGL
11 Aug	PGA Landmann Open	Halland	500,000	(Sweden) Rikard Karlberg	NGL
24 Aug	SM Match	Närke	450,000	(Sweden) Andreas Andersson	NGL
1 Sep	Västerås Mälarstaden Open	Västmanland	200,000	(Sweden) Joakim Rask	NGL
9 Sep	Telia Challenge Waxholm	Uppland	1,175,000	(England) Iain Pyman	CHA
23 Sep	EGCC Open	Estonia	€25,000	(Sweden) Joakim Rask	NGL
30 Sep	TourGolf Open	Södermanland	350,000	(Sweden) Jonas Pettersson	NGL

== Order of Merit ==
The Order of Merit was based on tournament results during the season, calculated using a points-based system.

Position	Player	Points
1	(Sweden) Rikard Karlberg	1,530
2	(Sweden) Joakim Rask	1,516
3	(Sweden) Oskar Henningsson	1,335
4	(Sweden) Andreas Högberg	1,098
5	(Sweden) Pehr Magnebrant	1,032

== See also ==
- 2007 Danish Golf Tour
- 2007 Finnish Tour
- 2007 Swedish Golf Tour (women)
