= Texbond Open =

Tournament information
- Location: Brescia, Italy
- Established: 2004
- Course: Gardagolf Country Club
- Par: 72
- Length: 7,112 yards (6,503 m)
- Tour: Challenge Tour
- Format: Stroke play
- Prize fund: €120,000
- Month played: July
- Final year: 2006

Tournament record score
- Aggregate: 269 Sam Little (2004); 269 Fredrik Widmark (2005)
- To par: −19 as above

Final champion
- (Spain) Carlos del Moral
- Location in Italy Location in Lombardy

The Texbond Open was a golf tournament on the Challenge Tour that was played from 2004 to 2006 at Gardagolf Country Club, close to the shores of Lake Garda in Soiano del Lago near Brescia, Italy.

== Winners ==
Year	Winner	Score	To par	Margin of victory	Runner(s)-up
2006	(Spain) Carlos del Moral	270	−18	Playoff	(England) Lee S. James
2005	(Sweden) Fredrik Widmark	269	−19	2 strokes	(Northern Ireland) Michael Hoey (Scotland) Marc Warren
2004	(England) Sam Little	269	−19	3 strokes	(Sweden) Henrik Nyström (Italy) Massimo Scarpa
