= 2001 Nordic Golf League =

Golf tour season

2001 Nordic Golf League season
- Duration: 23 April 2001 – 23 September 2001
- Number of official events: 23
- Most wins: (Sweden) Björn Bäck (3) (Denmark) Mads Vibe-Hastrup (3)
- Order of Merit: (Denmark) Mads Vibe-Hastrup

The 2001 Nordic Golf League was the third season of the Nordic Golf League, a third-tier tour recognised by the European Tour.

== Schedule ==
The following table lists official events during the 2001 season.

Date	Tournament	Host country	Purse	Winner (Note: The number in brackets after each winner's name is the number of Nordic Golf League events they had won up to and including that tournament. It is rare for someone to accumulate many wins on the Nordic Golf League as success at this level usually leads to promotion to the Challenge Tour.)
25 Apr	Titleist Open	Denmark	DKr 80,000	(Sweden) Joakim Grönhagen (1)
13 May	Sola Open	Norway	€8,000	(Denmark) Mads Vibe-Hastrup (1)
20 May	Kinnaborg Open	Sweden	SKr 175,000	(Sweden) Joakim Grönhagen (2)
27 May	Audi Open	Denmark	€20,000	(Denmark) Mads Vibe-Hastrup (2)
10 Jun	Canon Masters	Finland	€8,000	(Finland) Pasi Purhonen (2)
10 Jun	St Ibb Open	Sweden	SKr 225,000	(Sweden) Björn Pettersson (3)
10 Jun	Siemens Open	Norway	€8,000	(Norway) Anders Eriksen (1)
17 Jun	Sonera-Kiitolinja Open	Finland	€10,000	(Finland) Thomas Sundström (1)
17 Jun	Husqvarna Open	Sweden	SKr 300,000	(Sweden) Johan Bjerhag (1)
30 Jun	Match golf.se	Sweden	SKr 200,000	(Sweden) Björn Bäck (1)
8 Jul	Wilson Rebild Open	Denmark	DKr 150,000	(Denmark) Mads Vibe-Hastrup (3)
15 Jul	Sundbyholm Open	Sweden	SKr 250,000	(Sweden) Joakim Bäckström (1)
19 Jul	MGA Russian Cup	Russia	US$20,000	(Sweden) Jonas Runnquist (1)
29 Jul	Sorknes Birkebeiner Open	Norway	€8,000	(Sweden) Björn Bäck (2)
11 Aug	Sundsvall Golf Open	Sweden	SKr 175,000	(Sweden) Marcus Norgren (1)
16 Aug	TietoEnator Open	Sweden	SKr 175,000	(Sweden) Jesper Björklund (2)
19 Aug	Telehuset Norwegian Open	Norway	€30,000	(Sweden) Björn Bäck (3)
26 Aug	Griffin Open	Denmark	DKr 150,000	(Denmark) Ben Tinning (1)
31 Aug	Viking Line Challenge	Finland	€8,000	(Sweden) Magnus Carlsson (1)
2 Sep	SM Match	Sweden	SKr 300,000	(Sweden) Fredrik Widmark (4)
7 Sep	PGA Finnish Championship	Finland	€10,000	(Finland) Anssi Kankkonen (1)
8 Sep	Västerås Open	Sweden	SKr 250,000	(Sweden) Fredrick Månsson (2)
23 Sep	Sparebanken 1 Open	Norway	€20,000	(Sweden) Kristofer Svensson (3)

== Order of Merit ==
The Order of Merit was based on tournament results during the season, calculated using a points-based system. The top four players on the Order of Merit (not otherwise exempt) earned status to play on the 2002 Challenge Tour.

Position	Player	Points	Status earned
1	(Denmark) Mads Vibe-Hastrup	2,159	Promoted to European Tour (Top 15 of Challenge Tour Rankings)
2	(Sweden) Björn Bäck	1,939	Promoted to Challenge Tour
3	(Sweden) Kristofer Svensson	1,326	Promoted to Challenge Tour
4	(Sweden) Fredrick Månsson	1,322	Promoted to Challenge Tour
5	(Sweden) Joakim Grönhagen	1,182	Promoted to Challenge Tour
6	(Norway) Øyvind Rojahn	1,117	
7	(Sweden) Christian Nilsson	1,004	
8	(Denmark) Brian Akstrup	914	
9	(Sweden) Marcus Norgren	912	
10	(Sweden) Magnus Persson Atlevi	905	Qualified for European Tour (Top 25 in Q School)

== See also ==
- 2001 Swedish Golf Tour
