= Kronenbourg Open =

Tournament information
- Location: Soiano del Lago, Italy
- Established: 1993
- Course: Gardagolf Country Club
- Par: 72
- Tour: European Tour
- Format: Stroke play
- Prize fund: £200,000
- Month played: March
- Final year: 1993

Tournament record score
- Aggregate: 284 Sam Torrance (1993)
- To par: −4 as above

Final champion
- (Scotland) Sam Torrance
- Location in Italy Location in Lombardy

The Kronenbourg Open was a one-off European Tour golf tournament which was played at Gardagolf Country Club in Soiano del Lago, Italy from 25–28 March 1993. Sam Torrance shot 69-68-73-74 for a 4 under par 72 hole score of 284, and defeated his fellow Scot Mike Miller by one stroke. The prize fund was £200,000, which was the smallest on the European Tour that season.

== Winners ==
Year	Winner	Score	To par	Margin of victory	Runner-up
1994	Cancelled				
1993	(Scotland) Sam Torrance	284	−4	1 stroke	(Scotland) Mike Miller
