= Mugello Tuscany Open =

Tournament information
- Location: Scarperia, Italy
- Established: 2010
- Course: Una Poggio dei Medici Golf Club
- Par: 71
- Length: 7,119 yards (6,510 m)
- Tour: Challenge Tour
- Format: Stroke play
- Prize fund: €160,000
- Month played: July
- Final year: 2013

Tournament record score
- Aggregate: 267 Marco Crespi (2013)
- To par: −17 as above

Final champion
- (Italy) Marco Crespi
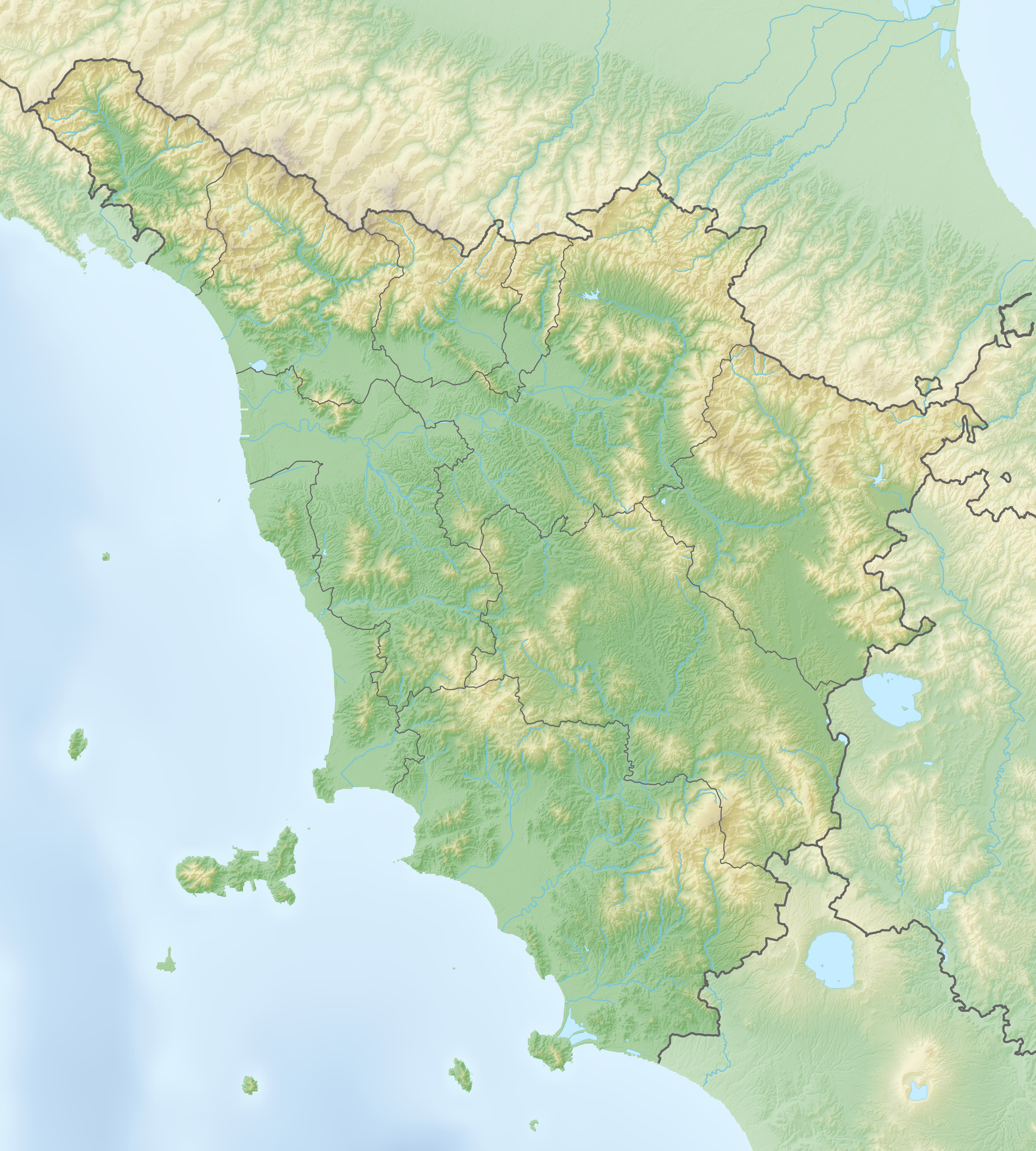
- Location in Italy Location in Tuscany

The Mugello Tuscany Open was a golf tournament on the Challenge Tour, played in Italy. It was held for the first time in 2010 when Floris de Vries triumphed in a sudden-death playoff over Thorbjørn Olesen. It was last played in 2013.

== Winners ==
Year	Winner	Score	To par	Margin of victory	Runner(s)-up
2013	(Italy) Marco Crespi	267	−17	1 stroke	(Portugal) José-Filipe Lima (Norway) Knut Børsheim
2012: No tournament
2011	(France) Anthony Snobeck	272	−12	1 stroke	(England) Chris Lloyd
2010	(Netherlands) Floris de Vries	274	−10	Playoff	(Denmark) Thorbjørn Olesen
