= Oskar Henningsson =

Swedish professional golfer

Personal information
- Full name: Oskar Karl Henningsson
- Nationality: Sweden
- Born: 10 August 1985 (age 41) Eksjö, Sweden
- Height: 1.79 m (5 ft 10 in)
- Weight: 85 kg (187 lb; 13.4 st)

Career
- Sport: Golf
- Turned professional: 2004
- Current tour: Challenge Tour
- Former tour: European Tour
- Professional wins: 11

Number of wins by tour
- European Tour: 1
- Other: 10

Oskar Karl Henningsson (born 10 August 1985) is a Swedish professional golfer.

== Career ==
In 1985, Henningsson was born in Eksjö. He later moved to Gränna. In 2004, Henningsson turned professional.

Henningsson reached the final stage of the European Tour Qualifying School in 2004 to gain a place on the second tier Challenge Tour for 2005. He had little success, and lost his playing status after just two seasons. Having mostly played in minor tournaments in Sweden for two years, he returned to the qualifying school at the end of 2008. He came out with the number one card for the European Tour, becoming the first player ever to be medalist at qualifying school having gone through all three stages.

In 2009, Henningsson won his first European Tour title at the Moravia Silesia Open in the Czech Republic. He came from behind in the final round with a 5 under par 67 to finish 2 strokes ahead of overnight leader Steve Webster and Sam Little.

== Professional wins (11) ==
=== European Tour wins (1) ===
No.	Date	Tournament	Winning score	Margin of victory	Runners-up
1	2 Aug 2009	Moravia Silesia Open	−13 (70-71-67-67=275)	2 strokes	(England) Sam Little, (England) Steve Webster

=== Other wins (10) ===
- 2007 Varberg Open (Swedish mini-tour)
- 2008 Svalöv Open, Wiredaholm Open (both SGF Golf Ranking)
- 2013 Gränna Open (SGF Golf Ranking)
- 2017 Wiredaholm Open, Gränna Open (both SGF Golf Ranking)
- 2018 Wiredaholm Open, Gränna Open (both SGF Golf Ranking)
- 2019 Kumla Open by Malmbergs El AB, Hjo S Open (both Swedish mini-tour)

== Team appearances ==
Amateur

- European Boys' Team Championship (representing Sweden): 2003
- European Youths' Team Championship (representing Sweden): 2004

== See also ==
- 2008 European Tour Qualifying School graduates
