= 2005 Challenge Tour graduates =

This is a list of players who graduated from the Challenge Tour in 2005. The top 20 players on the Challenge Tour's money list in 2005 earned their European Tour card for 2006.

	2005 Challenge Tour		2006 European Tour				
Player	Money list rank	Earnings (€)	Starts	Cuts made	Best finish	Money list rank	Earnings (€)
(Scotland) Marc Warren*	1	103,577	28	12	Win	42	610,885
(Spain) Carl Suneson	2	103,129	26	11	9	135	147,013
(Sweden) Fredrik Widmark	3	99,750	27	13	T12	148	103,914
(England) Andrew Butterfield	4	94,335	30	18	T7	129	168,158
(South Africa) Michael Kirk*	5	90,620	24	5	T51	210	26,749
(Sweden) Steven Jeppesen	6	88,517	32	13	T8	103	223,796
(England) Benn Barham	7	86,259	29	12	T5	97	245,310
(Northern Ireland) Michael Hoey*	8	86,124	27	7	T21	187	50,414
(Argentina) Daniel Vancsik*	9	81,053	24	10	T16	144	120,812
(England) Richard McEvoy	10	80,047	28	10	T17	152	97,979
(Argentina) Rafael Gómez*	11	79,880	19	7	T22	173	71,876
(Republic of Ireland) David Higgins	12	77,259	27	16	T7	127	169,638
(England) Paul Dwyer*	13	73,479	25	6	T8	211	26,322
(Argentina) Andrés Romero*	14	71,221	21	9	T2	35	694,363
(Paraguay) Marco Ruiz*	15	69,845	22	8	T14	174	66,714
(Argentina) Ariel Cañete	16	66,087	20	10	T7	143	122,346
(England) Tom Whitehouse	17	63,344	24	15	T7	95	250,952
(England) Ross Fisher*	18	61,029	29	18	T3	66	370,275
(Republic of Ireland) Stephen Browne	19	59,916	22	7	T18	153	97,820
(Finland) Toni Karjalainen*	20	58,384	15	5	T20	203	32,246

* European Tour rookie in 2006
T = Tied
The player retained his European Tour card for 2007 (finished inside the top 118).
The player did not retain his European Tour card for 2007, but retained conditional status (finished between 119 and 150).
The player did not retain his European Tour card for 2007 (finished outside the top 150).

The players ranked 16th through 20th were placed below the Qualifying School graduates on the exemption list, and thus could improve their status by competing in Qualifying School. Tom Whitehouse and Ross Fisher both improved their status in this way, with Whitehouse medalling at Q School.

== Winners on the European Tour in 2006 ==
No.	Date	Player	Tournament	Winning score	Margin of victory	Runner-up
1	6 Aug	(Scotland) Marc Warren	EnterCard Scandinavian Masters	−10 (67-69-73-69=278)	Playoff	(Sweden) Robert Karlsson

== Runners-up on the European Tour in 2006 ==
No.	Date	Player	Tournament	Winner	Winning score	Runner-up score
1	16 Jul	(Argentina) Andrés Romero	Barclays Scottish Open	(Sweden) Johan Edfors	−13 (65-69-74-63=271)	−11 (72-64-68-69=273)

== See also ==
- 2005 European Tour Qualifying School graduates
- 2006 European Tour
