= David Griffiths (golfer) =

English golfer (born 1980)

Personal information
- Nationality: England
- Born: 26 May 1980 (age 46) Watford, England
- Height: 1.91 m (6 ft 3 in)
- Weight: 79 kg (174 lb; 12.4 st)

Career
- Sport: Golf
- Turned professional: 2001
- Former tours: European Tour; Nationwide Tour; Challenge Tour
- Professional wins: 1

Best results in major championships
- Masters Tournament: DNP
- PGA Championship: DNP
- U.S. Open: DNP
- The Open Championship: CUT: 2004

David Griffiths (born 26 May 1980) is an English professional golfer.

== Career ==
Griffiths had a notable amateur career, winning the Carris Trophy and captaining the England boys side before turning professional in 2001.

Griffiths reached the final stage of PGA Tour qualifying school in 2002, enabling him to join the Nationwide Tour for 2003, where he would play nine events. For 2004 he returned to Europe, playing the Challenge Tour before successfully completing the European Tour's qualifying school that winter. He played on the European Tour from 2005 to 2008, where his best finishes were a pair of T3s, in the 2007 Estoril Open de Portugal and the 2006 Open de España, which he had led after three rounds. He returned to the Challenge Tour for 2009 after a poor 2008 season, and only made one cut at that level in 2010. In the 2012 European Tour qualifying school he missed out by just one stroke but gained a place on the 2013 Challenge Tour. However, he again had little success and dropped off the tour at the end of the season.

== Amateur wins ==
- 1997 Carris Trophy
- 1999 West of England Stroke Play Championship

== Professional wins (1) ==
=== PGA EuroPro Tour wins (1) ===
No.	Date	Tournament	Winning score	Margin of victory	Runner-up
1	23 Jul 2004	ISM Classic	−11 (69-68-68=205)	1 stroke	(England) James Holmes

== Results in major championships ==
Tournament	2004
The Open Championship	CUT

Note: Griffiths only played in The Open Championship.
CUT = missed the half-way cut

== Team appearances ==
Amateur

- European Boys' Team Championship (representing England): 1997
- Jacques Léglise Trophy (representing Great Britain & Ireland): 1998 (winners)
- European Youths' Team Championship (representing England): 2000 (winners)

== See also ==
- 2005 European Tour Qualifying School graduates
