= Tom Whitehouse =

English golfer (born 1980)

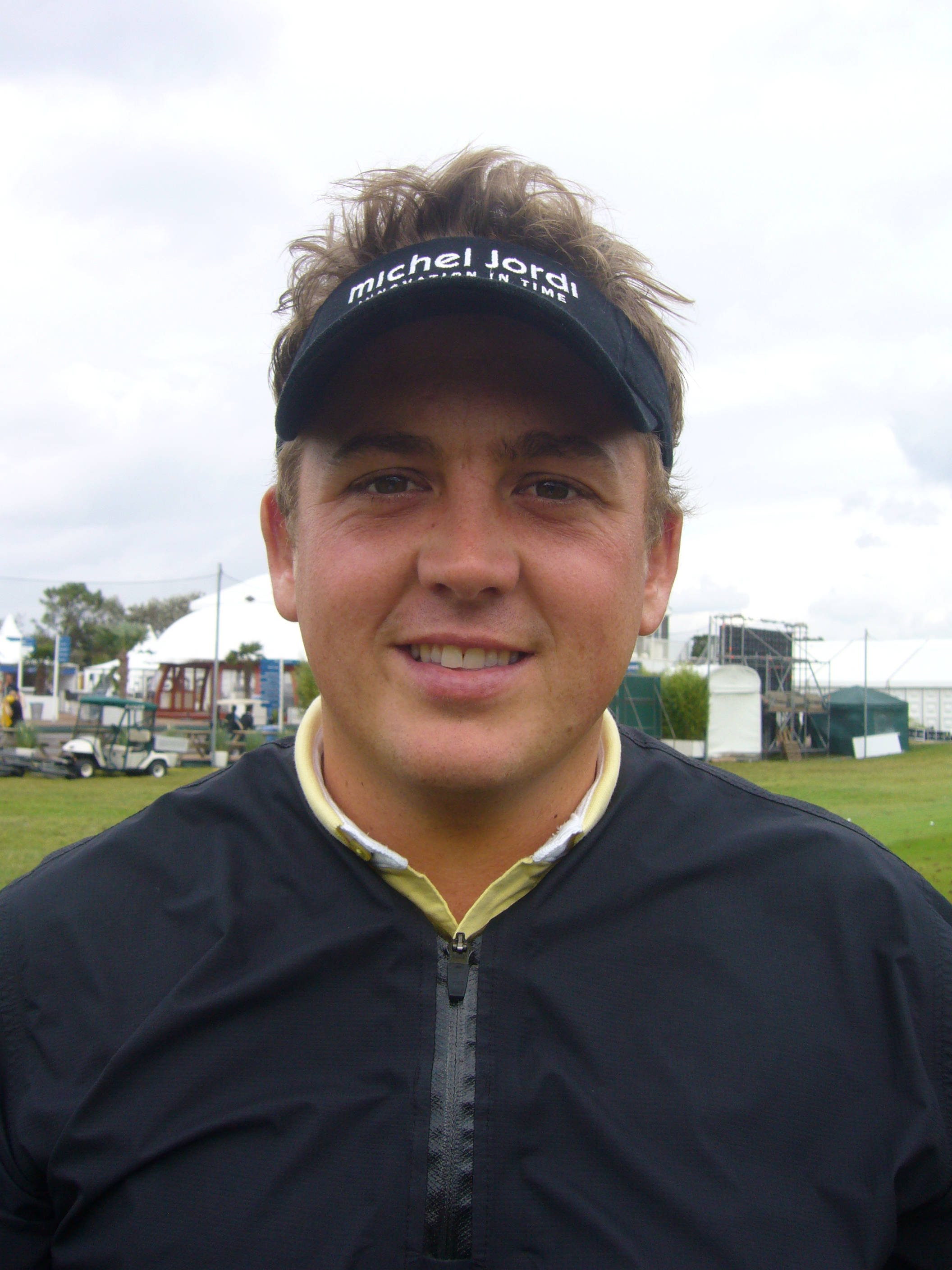
- Whitehouse at the 2008 KLM Open

Personal information
- Nationality: England
- Born: 22 March 1980 (age 46) Birmingham, England
- Height: 6 ft 0 in (1.83 m)
- Weight: 189 lb (86 kg; 13.5 st)

Career
- Sport: Golf
- Turned professional: 2002
- Former tours: European Tour; Challenge Tour; PGA EuroPro Tour
- Professional wins: 4

Number of wins by tour
- Challenge Tour: 1
- Other: 3

Best results in major championships
- Masters Tournament: DNP
- PGA Championship: DNP
- U.S. Open: DNP
- The Open Championship: CUT: 2002, 2010

Achievements and awards
- PGA EuroPro Tour Order of Merit winner: 2003

Tom Whitehouse (born 22 March 1980) is an English professional golfer.

== Career ==
Whitehouse was born in Birmingham and turned professional in 2002. He worked his way through the ranks, winning twice on the third tier PGA EuroPro Tour in 2003 as he led the Order of Merit to earn a place on the Challenge Tour for 2004. He won the Estoril Challenge Open Portugal Telecom that season and finished 24th on the end of season Challenge Tour Rankings. The following year he improved to 17th and at the end of season was medalist at European Tour Qualifying School Final Stage to earn his place at the top level.

In his debit season on the European Tour, Whitehouse finished just inside the top 100 on the Order of Merit having has three top 10 finishes. The following season he had four top 10s but slipped to 100th on the Order of Merit. In 2008 he made just nine cuts and was back on the Challenge Tour in 2009.

== Amateur wins ==
- 2001 Spanish Amateur Open Championship

== Professional wins (4) ==
=== Challenge Tour wins (1) ===
| No. | Date | Tournament | Winning score | Margin of victory | Runner-up |
|---|---|---|---|---|---|
| 1 | 3 Oct 2004 | Estoril Challenge Open Portugal Telecom | −10 (69-67-68-70=274) | 4 strokes | (Sweden) Kalle Brink |

=== PGA EuroPro Tour wins (2) ===
| No. | Date | Tournament | Winning score | Margin of victory | Runner(s)-up |
|---|---|---|---|---|---|
| 1 | 23 May 2003 | Peugeot International | −5 (69-66-73=208) | Playoff | (England) Jonathan Herbert, (United States) Brandon Kearney, (England) Phil Worthington |
| 2 | 3 Oct 2003 | Wales National Classic | −2 (70-73-74=217) | Playoff | (England) Ryan Fenwick |

=== Jamega Pro Golf Tour wins (1) ===
| No. | Date | Tournament | Winning score | Margin of victory | Runner-up |
|---|---|---|---|---|---|
| 1 | 23 Aug 2010 | The Warwickshire - Kings | −6 (70-68=138) | 2 strokes | (England) Duncan Elbury |

== Results in major championships ==
| Tournament | 2002 | 2003 | 2004 | 2005 | 2006 | 2007 | 2008 | 2009 | 2010 |
|---|---|---|---|---|---|---|---|---|---|
| The Open Championship | CUT | | | | | | | | CUT |

Note: Whitehouse only played in The Open Championship.

Did not play

CUT = missed the half-way cut

== Team appearances ==
Amateur

- European Boys' Team Championship (representing England): 1997
- European Youths' Team Championship (representing England): 2000 (winners)

== See also ==
- 2005 Challenge Tour graduates
- 2005 European Tour Qualifying School graduates
