= Anthony Snobeck =

French professional golfer (born 1983)

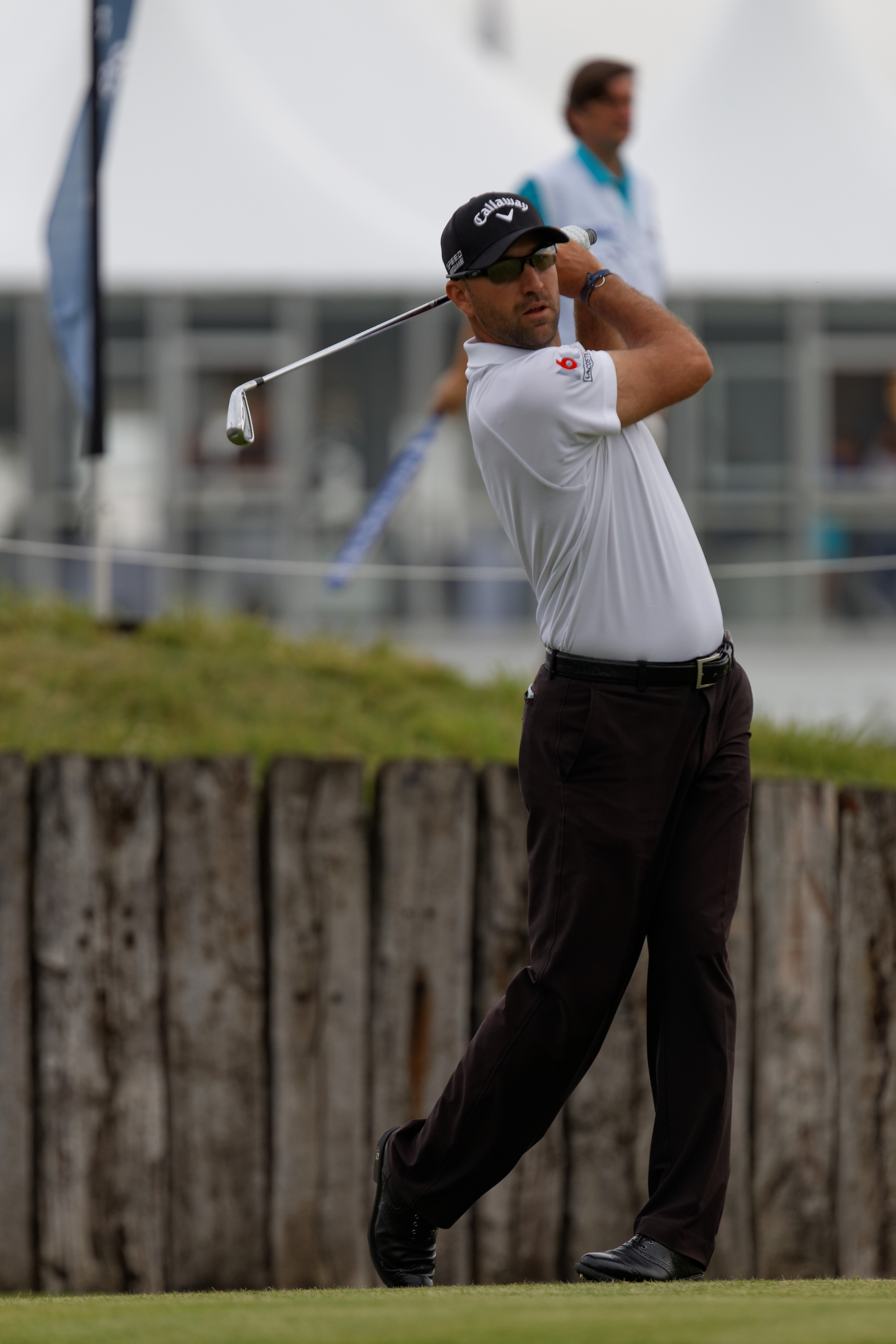

Personal information
- Full name: Anthony Snobeck
- Nationality: France
- Born: 20 April 1983 (age 43) Paris, France
- Height: 1.91 m (6 ft 3 in)

Career
- Sport: Golf
- Turned professional: 2005
- Former tours: European Tour; Challenge Tour
- Professional wins: 2

Number of wins by tour
- Challenge Tour: 2

Anthony Snobeck (born 20 April 1983) is a French professional golfer, who has played on both the European and Challenge Tours.

== Biography ==
Snobeck was born in Paris; his father Dany was a successful racing driver who won the French Supertouring Championship three times and the Andros Trophy twice, and the family lived adjacent to Magny-Cours, where he owned a car company. Snobeck began playing golf in 1995, and by the age of seventeen was a three-handicap. He began being coached by Antoine Lebouc, former European Tour player and husband of Patricia Meunier-Lebouc, in 2002, and under his guidance turned professional in 2005. After a season on the Alps Tour, Snobeck recorded his first win as a professional at the 2006 Tessali-Metaponto Open di Puglia e Basilicata on the Challenge Tour, and finished the season at 23rd on the rankings, just outside the top twenty graduates. However, Snobeck did belatedly reach the top-tier European Tour in 2009, by coming through the Qualifying School. His 2009 season was a struggle, however, and he made only four cuts, with a best finish of T23rd, before returning to the Challenge Tour. He picked up his second victory at that level in 2011.

== Professional wins (2) ==
=== Challenge Tour wins (2) ===
No.	Date	Tournament	Winning score	Margin of victory	Runner-up
1	30 Apr 2006	Tessali-Metaponto Open di Puglia e Basilicata	−14 (72-69-65-66=272)	Playoff	(Wales) Kyron Sullivan
2	15 May 2011	Mugello Tuscany Open	−12 (71-69-65-67=272)	1 stroke	(England) Chris Lloyd

Challenge Tour playoff record (1–0)

No.	Year	Tournament	Opponent	Result
1	2006	Tessali-Metaponto Open di Puglia e Basilicata	(Wales) Kyron Sullivan	Won with par on first extra hole

== See also ==
- 2008 European Tour Qualifying School graduates
- 2012 European Tour Qualifying School graduates

== Team appearances ==
Amateur

- European Youths' Team Championship (representing France): 2002, 2004
