= Connor Arendell =

American professional golfer (born 1990)

Personal information
- Nationality: United States
- Born: March 30, 1990 (age 36) Cape Coral, Florida, U.S.
- Height: 5 ft 10 in (178 cm)
- Weight: 185 lb (84 kg)

Career
- Sport: Golf
- College: University of Central Florida
- Turned professional: 2011
- Current tour: Korn Ferry Tour
- Former tours: European Tour; Challenge Tour
- Professional wins: 2

Best results in major championships
- Masters Tournament: DNP
- PGA Championship: DNP
- U.S. Open: CUT: 2019
- The Open Championship: DNP

Connor Arendell (born March 30, 1990) is an American professional golfer. Arendell has played on the Challenge Tour, European Tour, and Korn Ferry Tour.

== Early life and amateur career ==
Arendell was born in Cape Coral, Florida. He played college golf at the University of Central Florida where he was first team All-Conference USA and member of three consecutive conference team championships for the Knights. In 2009, Connor qualified for and advanced to the final 16 of the U.S. Amateur at Southern Hills in Tulsa, Oklahoma where he lost, 2 and 1, to Peter Uihlein. In 2010, he once again advanced to the final 16 of the U.S. Amateur at Chambers Bay, University Place, Washington where he lost to Patrick Cantlay, 1 down.

== Professional career ==
Arendell qualified for the European Tour by playing in all three stages of Q-School in late 2013, finishing T-8th. He also had conditional status on the Web.com Tour in 2014 after competing in qualifying school. He played on the European Tour and Challenge Tour from 2014 to 2016. His best finish was tied for second at the 2014 Le Vaudreuil Golf Challenge. Since 2018, he has played on the Korn Ferry Tour. In 2019, he qualified for and played in the 2019 U.S. Open at Pebble Beach. On March 1, 2020, Arendell won the Yuengling Open at the Fort Myers Country Club in a playoff with a birdie on the second hole.

== Personal life ==
Arendell lives in Fort Myers, Florida.

== Professional wins (2) ==
- 2021 Florida Open
- 2023 Florida Open

== See also ==
- 2013 European Tour Qualifying School graduates
