= Russian Challenge Cup =

Golf tournament

M2M Russian Challenge Cup
Tournament information
- Location: Moscow, Russia
- Established: 2010
- Courses: Tseleevo Golf & Polo Club
- Par: 72
- Length: 7,491 yards (6,850 m)
- Tour: Challenge Tour
- Format: Stroke play
- Prize fund: €200,000
- Month played: September
- Final year: 2012

Tournament record score
- Aggregate: 277 Carlos del Moral (2010); 277 Sam Little (2011)
- To par: −11 as above

Final champion
- (France) Alexandre Kaleka
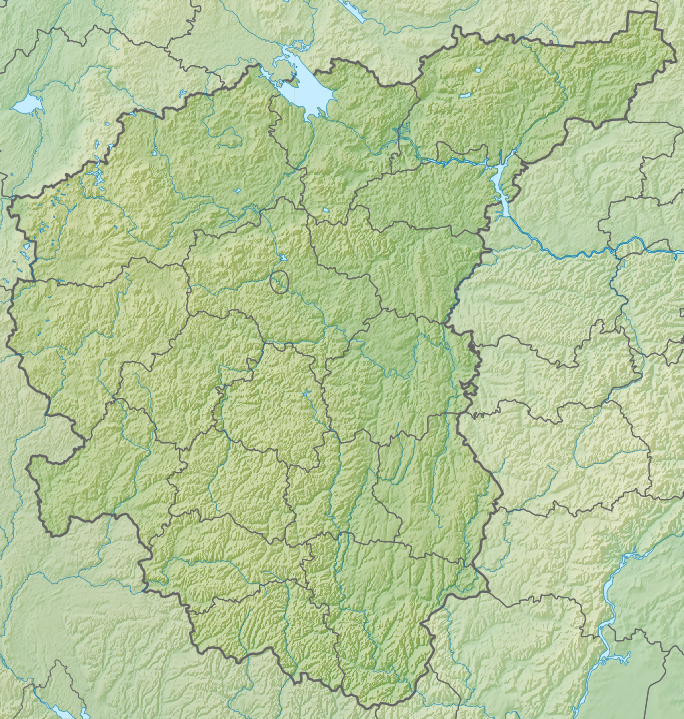
- Location in Russia Location in Central Federal District

The M2M Russian Challenge Cup was a golf tournament on the Challenge Tour, played in Russia. It was played from 2010 to 2012 at Tseleevo Golf & Polo Club.

== Winners ==
Year	Winner	Score	To par	Margin of victory	Runner(s)-up
2012	(France) Alexandre Kaleka	281	−7	1 stroke	(Italy) Alessandro Tadini (Chile) Mark Tullo
2011	(England) Sam Little	277	−11	1 stroke	(England) Andrew Johnston
2010	(Spain) Carlos del Moral	277	−11	1 stroke	(England) Tommy Fleetwood (England) Matt Ford (Denmark) Thorbjørn Olesen
