= 2003 PGA EuroPro Tour =

Golf tour season

2003 PGA EuroPro Tour season
- Duration: 1 May 2003 – 26 October 2003
- Number of official events: 18
- Most wins: (Scotland) David Orr (2) (England) Mark Pullan (2) (England) Tom Whitehouse (2)
- Order of Merit: (England) Tom Whitehouse

The 2003 PGA EuroPro Tour was the second season of the PGA EuroPro Tour, a third-tier tour recognised by the European Tour.

== Schedule ==
The following table lists official events during the 2003 season.

Date	Tournament	Location	Purse (£)	Winner (Note: The number in brackets after each winner's name is the number of PGA EuroPro Tour events they had won up to and including that tournament. It is rare for someone to accumulate many wins on the PGA EuroPro Tour as success at this level usually leads to promotion to the Challenge Tour.)
3 May	Sky Sports Trophy	Monmouthshire	40,000	(Wales) Bradley Dredge (1)
16 May	Pokermillion.com Trophy	Derbyshire	40,000	(England) Mark Smith (1)
23 May	Peugeot International	West Yorkshire	40,000	(England) Tom Whitehouse (1)
29 May	Quinta da Ria	Portugal	€80,000	(England) John Mellor (1)
5 Jun	Vilamoura	Portugal	€80,000	(Scotland) Graham Rankin (1)
12 Jun	Palmares	Portugal	€80,000	(Portugal) Antonio Sobrinho (1)
20 Jun	Quinta da Marinha Oitavos	Portugal	€92,000	(Scotland) Peter Whiteford (2)
28 Jun	Matchroom Golf Management International	Kent	40,000	(England) Sam Pigott (1)
3 Jul	Stoke by Nayland Championship	Essex	40,000	(South Africa) Thomas Aiken (1)
18 Jul	Owston Hall Trophy	South Yorkshire	40,000	(England) Mark Pullan (1)
1 Aug	ISM Classic	Derbyshire	40,000	(England) Oliver Whiteley (1)
8 Aug	Commercial Vehicle Direct Insurance Trophy	Greater Manchester	40,000	(England) Paul Streeter (1)
22 Aug	Bristol & London Open	Bristol	40,000	(England) Matthew King (1)
30 Aug	Countryside Properties Classic	Cheshire	40,000	(Scotland) David Orr (2)
5 Sep	Glenmuir Classic	East Lothian	40,000	(England) Mark Pullan (2)
3 Oct	Wales National Classic	South East Wales	40,000	(England) Tom Whitehouse (2)
10 Oct	Ufford Park Classic	Suffolk	40,000	(England) Chris Sands (1)
26 Oct	Oceânico Developments Tour Championship	Portugal	75,000	(Scotland) David Orr (3)

== Order of Merit ==
The Order of Merit was based on prize money won during the season, calculated in Pound sterling. The top four players on the Order of Merit (not otherwise exempt) earned status to play on the 2004 Challenge Tour.

Position	Player	Prize money (£)	Status earned
1	(England) Tom Whitehouse	34,182	Qualified for European Tour (Top 25 in Q School)
2	(Scotland) David Orr	33,999	Promoted to Challenge Tour
3	(Scotland) Graham Rankin	27,169	Promoted to Challenge Tour
4	(Scotland) Peter Whiteford	25,201	Promoted to Challenge Tour
5	(England) Matthew King	24,291	Promoted to Challenge Tour
6	(England) Mark Pullan	21,680	
7	(South Africa) Michiel Bothma	20,222	
8	(England) Sam Pigott	19,826	
9	(England) Chris Sands	18,500	
10	(England) Ryan Fenwick	17,443	
