= Gary Clark (golfer) =

English professional golfer (born 1971)

Personal information
- Full name: Gary Ben Clark
- Nationality: England
- Born: 9 April 1971 (age 55) London, England
- Height: 5 ft 10 in (1.78 m)
- Weight: 168 lb (76 kg; 12.0 st)
- Spouse: Christina (m. 2003)
- Children: 2

Career
- Sport: Golf
- College: University of Arkansas
- Turned professional: 1995
- Former tour: European Tour
- Professional wins: 1

Number of wins by tour
- Challenge Tour: 1

Best results in major championships
- Masters Tournament: DNP
- PGA Championship: DNP
- U.S. Open: DNP
- The Open Championship: T66: 1997

Gary Ben Clark (born 9 April 1971) is an English professional golfer.

== Early life and amateur career ==
Clark was born in London. He attended the University of Arkansas.

== Professional career ==
In 1995, Clark turned professional. He qualified for the European Tour through qualifying school at the end of that year.

Clark finished in 103rd place on the Order of Merit in his début season. Since losing his playing privileges the following year, he has played predominantly on Europe's second tier Challenge Tour, where he has a best of 5th place on the end of season rankings in 2001. That enabled him to graduate back to the European Tour for the following season. He has also come through qualifying school twice, in 2005 and 2008, to regain his place at the top level, but has not been able to maintain his card although he was granted a medical exemption for the 2010 season.

Clark recorded his maiden professional win in 2008 at the DHL Wroclaw Open on the Challenge Tour.

== Professional wins (1) ==
=== Challenge Tour wins (1) ===
No.	Date	Tournament	Winning score	Margin of victory	Runner-up
1	25 May 2008	DHL Wrocław Open	−18 (66-67-63-66=262)	2 strokes	(England) Gary Boyd

Challenge Tour playoff record (0–1)

No.	Year	Tournament	Opponents	Result
1	2005	Riu Tikida Hotels Moroccan Classic	(England) Oliver Whiteley, (Sweden) Fredrik Widmark	Widmark won with par on first extra hole

== Results in major championships ==
Tournament	1995	1996	1997	1998	1999
The Open Championship	100		T66		

Tournament	2000	2001	2002	2003	2004	2005	2006	2007	2008	2009	2010
The Open Championship											CUT

Note: Clark only played in The Open Championship.

Did not play

CUT = missed the half-way cut
"T" = tied

== See also ==
- 2005 European Tour Qualifying School graduates
- 2008 European Tour Qualifying School graduates
