= 2004 PGA EuroPro Tour =

Golf tour season

2004 PGA EuroPro Tour season
- Duration: 28 April 2004 – 24 October 2004
- Number of official events: 20
- Most wins: (England) David Close (2) (England) Simon Lilly (2) (Republic of Ireland) Tim Rice (2) (England) Lee Slattery (2)
- Order of Merit: (England) Simon Lilly

The 2004 PGA EuroPro Tour was the third season of the PGA EuroPro Tour, a third-tier tour recognised by the European Tour.

== Schedule ==
The following table lists official events during the 2004 season.

Date	Tournament	Location	Purse (£)	Winner (Note: The number in brackets after each winner's name is the number of PGA EuroPro Tour events they had won up to and including that tournament. It is rare for someone to accumulate many wins on the PGA EuroPro Tour as success at this level usually leads to promotion to the Challenge Tour.)
30 Apr	Sky Sports East Lothian Masters	East Lothian	40,000	(England) David Close (1)
8 May	Pokermillion.com European Classic	Kent	40,000	(England) David Close (2)
24 May	Casinos Algarve Quinta Da Ria Masters	Portugal	45,000	(Republic of Ireland) Tim Rice (1)
5 Jun	Golf Weekly International Open	Hertfordshire	40,000	(England) Simon Lilly (2)
12 Jun	Pokermillion.com European Masters	Sussex	40,000	(England) Lee Slattery (1)
18 Jun	Cardrona Classic	Peeblesshire	40,000	(Netherlands) Inder van Weerelt (1)
25 Jun	St Andrews Bay Masters	Fife	40,000	(England) Joe Templer (1)
1 Jul	888.com Masters	Suffolk	40,000	(England) Lee Slattery (2)
9 Jul	Pokermillion.com European Trophy	Norfolk	40,000	(England) Kieran Staunton (1)
16 Jul	Mortgage Group Classic	Bristol	40,000	(England) Geoffrey Harris (1)
23 Jul	ISM Classic	Shropshire	40,000	(England) David Griffiths (1)
30 Jul	Peugeot International	Derbyshire	40,000	(England) Simon Hurd (1)
6 Aug	Matchroom Golf Management Classic	South Yorkshire	40,000	(England) Andrew Butterfield (1)
20 Aug	China Fleet International Open	Cornwall	40,000	(England) Sam Pigott (2)
27 Aug	Swallow Hotel Open	Suffolk	40,000	(Republic of Ireland) Tim Rice (2)
3 Sep	Brown & Mason Classic	Essex	40,000	(England) Denny Lucas (1)
11 Sep	Golf Pages Trophy	Northamptonshire	40,000	(England) Michael Nesbit (1)
23 Sep	888.com European Open	Warwickshire	40,000	(England) James Holmes (1)
1 Oct	Ufford Park Classic	Suffolk	40,000	(Australia) John Wade (1)
24 Oct	Mosatrajectum.com Tour Championship	Spain	75,000	(England) Simon Lilly (3)

== Order of Merit ==
The Order of Merit was based on prize money won during the season, calculated in Pound sterling. The top five players on the Order of Merit (not otherwise exempt) earned status to play on the 2005 Challenge Tour.

Position	Player	Prize money (£)	Status earned
1	(England) Simon Lilly	37,047	Promoted to Challenge Tour
2	(Republic of Ireland) Tim Rice	35,047	Promoted to Challenge Tour
3	(England) Lee Slattery	31,948	Promoted to European Tour (Top 15 of Challenge Tour Rankings)
4	(England) James Holmes	24,565	Promoted to Challenge Tour
5	(England) David Close	22,586	Promoted to Challenge Tour
6	(England) Denny Lucas	20,790	Promoted to Challenge Tour
7	(Netherlands) Inder van Weerelt	20,604	
8	(England) Michael Welch	19,093	
9	(Australia) John Wade	18,687	
10	(England) Kieran Staunton	17,023	
