= 2008 European Tour Qualifying School graduates =

This is a list of the 32 players who earned their 2009 European Tour card through Q School in 2008.

Place	Player	European Tour starts	Cuts made	Notes
1	(Sweden) Oskar Henningsson	5	2	
T2	(Spain) Carlos del Moral	11	6	1 Challenge Tour win
T2	(Australia) Wade Ormsby	107	54	
4	(England) Danny Willett	9	6	Played in 2007 Walker Cup; former number one-ranked amateur
T5	(Sweden) Joakim Haeggman	400	253	3 European Tour wins; played in 1993 Ryder Cup
T5	(England) Chris Wood	9	5	Finished T5 in 2008 Open Championship as amateur
7	(Norway) Eirik Tage Johansen	17	5	
8	(Northern Ireland) Michael Hoey	58	19	3 Challenge Tour wins
T9	(Sweden) Åke Nilsson	0	0	
T9	(Austria) Bernd Wiesberger	3	1	
11	(England) Gary Clark	142	67	1 Challenge Tour win
T12	(Scotland) Andrew Coltart	428	272	2 European Tour wins; played in 1999 Ryder Cup
T12	(Thailand) Chinnarat Phadungsil	34	13	2 Asian Tour wins
T12	(France) Anthony Snobeck	6	1	1 Challenge Tour win
T15	(Scotland) Chris Doak	9	2	
T15	(Scotland) David Drysdale	153	71	2 Challenge Tour wins
T15	(Italy) Lorenzo Gagli	2	1	
T15	(Australia) Matthew Millar	75	45	
T15	(Paraguay) Fabrizio Zanotti	29	11	1 Challenge Tour win
T20	(Australia) Michael Curtain	3	2	
T20	(Scotland) Callum Macaulay	1	0	
T20	(Paraguay) Marco Ruiz	33	14	1 Challenge Tour win
T20	(Netherlands) Inder van Weerelt	4	1	
T24	(Zimbabwe) Marc Cayeux	87	39	3 Challenge Tour wins, 9 Sunshine Tour wins
T24	(South Africa) Branden Grace	5	2	
T24	(Wales) Stuart Manley	74	29	Played in 2003 Walker Cup
T24	(England) John Mellor	121	58	1 Challenge Tour win
T24	(Sweden) Henrik Nyström	228	107	
T29	(Northern Ireland) Jonathan Caldwell	0	0	Played in 2007 Walker Cup
T29	(Italy) Federico Colombo	2	1	
T29	(Spain) Alfredo García-Heredia	18	8	
T29	(Spain) Santiago Luna	553	318	1 European Tour win

2009 European Tour rookie

== 2009 Results ==
Player	Starts	Cuts made	Best finish	Money list rank	Earnings (€)
(Sweden) Oskar Henningsson*	21	9	Win	68	476,090
(Spain) Carlos del Moral*	24	15	T12	141	189,233
(Australia) Wade Ormsby	23	12	T15	166	104,871
(England) Danny Willett*	26	20	T4	58	596,462
(Sweden) Joakim Haeggman	21	11	T7	154	142,800
(England) Chris Wood*	24	18	T3	44	679,559
(Norway) Eirik Tage Johansen	19	7	T35	213	45,182
(Northern Ireland) Michael Hoey	25	11	Win	93	341,327
(Sweden) Åke Nilsson*	20	9	T3	173	93,397
(Austria) Bernd Wiesberger*	20	11	T14	172	94,750
(England) Gary Clark	9	3	T38	263	15,075
(Scotland) Andrew Coltart	28	13	T6	122	236,639
(Thailand) Chinnarat Phadungsil*	18	9	T28	203	56,669
(France) Anthony Snobeck*	17	4	T23	231	28,074
(Scotland) Chris Doak*	20	9	T11	168	99,911
(Scotland) David Drysdale	27	21	2	48	651,634
(Italy) Lorenzo Gagli*	6	2	T3	219	37,897
(Australia) Matthew Millar	17	7	T17	194	68,583
(Paraguay) Fabrizio Zanotti	23	18	2	63	511,756
(Australia) Michael Curtain*	14	5	T39	257	17,471
(Scotland) Callum Macaulay*	22	15	2	134	210,991
(Paraguay) Marco Ruiz	14	4	T26	232	28,000
(Netherlands) Inder van Weerelt*	20	10	T10	183	85,175
(Zimbabwe) Marc Cayeux	21	11	T4	135	210,408
(South Africa) Branden Grace*	25	13	T6	148	166,138
(Wales) Stuart Manley	14	3	T10	221	37,365
(England) John Mellor	16	6	T26	222	36,904
(Sweden) Henrik Nyström	2	1	83	355	1,614
(Northern Ireland) Jonathan Caldwell*	14	4	T31	243	22,637
(Italy) Federico Colombo*	10	1	T72	347	1,869
(Spain) Alfredo García-Heredia*	16	6	T24	212	47,093
(Spain) Santiago Luna	14	7	16	179	89,830

* European Tour rookie in 2009
T = Tied
The player retained his European Tour card for 2010 (finished inside the top 120).
The player did not retain his European Tour Tour card for 2010, but retained conditional status (finished between 121 and 153).
The player did not retain his European Tour card for 2010 (finished outside the top 153).

== Winners on the European Tour in 2009 ==
No.	Date	Player	Tournament	Winning score	Margin of victory	Runner(s)-up
1	5 Apr	(Northern Ireland) Michael Hoey	Estoril Open de Portugal	−7 (66-76-69-66=277)	Playoff	(Spain) Gonzalo Fernández-Castaño
2	2 Aug	(Sweden) Oskar Henningsson	Moravia Silesia Open	−13 (70-71-67-67=275)	2 strokes	(England) Sam Little, (England) Steve Webster

== Runners-up on the European Tour in 2009 ==
No.	Date	Player	Tournament	Winner	Winning score	Runner-up score
1	22 Mar	(Scotland) Callum Macaulay	Madeira Islands Open BPI - Portugal	(Argentina) Estanislao Goya	−6 (68-68-69-73=278)	−5 (74-74-67-64=279)
2	29 Mar	(Scotland) David Drysdale	Open de Andalucia	(Denmark) Søren Kjeldsen	−14 (68-72-62-72=274)	−11 (70-67-66-74=277)
3	3 May	(Paraguay) Fabrizio Zanotti	Open de España	(France) Thomas Levet	−18 (64-67-71-68=270)	−16 (71-70-66-65=272)

== See also ==
- 2008 Challenge Tour graduates
- 2009 European Tour
