= NH Collection Open =

Tournament information
- Location: Cádiz, Spain
- Established: 2014
- Course: La Reserva de Sotogrande Club de Golf
- Par: 72
- Length: 7,234 yards (6,615 m)
- Tours: European Tour; Challenge Tour
- Format: Stroke play
- Prize fund: €600,000
- Month played: April
- Final year: 2014

Tournament record score
- Aggregate: 278 Marco Crespi (2014)
- To par: −10 as above

Final champion
- (Italy) Marco Crespi
- Location in Spain Location in Andalusia

The NH Collection Open was a one-off golf tournament dual-ranked by the European Tour and the Challenge Tour. It was played for the only time in April 2014 at the La Reserva de Sotogrande Club de Golf in Cádiz, Spain.

== Winners ==
Year	Tours (Note: CHA − Challenge Tour; EUR − European Tour.)	Winner	Score	To par	Margin of victory	Runners-up
2014	CHA, EUR	(Italy) Marco Crespi	278	−10	2 strokes	(Spain) Jordi García Pinto (Scotland) Richie Ramsay
