= Adam Gee (golfer) =

English golfer (born 1980)

Personal information
- Nationality: England
- Born: 22 October 1980 (age 46) Carshalton, England
- Height: 1.85 m (6 ft 1 in)
- Weight: 83 kg (183 lb; 13.1 st)

Career
- Sport: Golf
- College: University of North Carolina Wilmington
- Turned professional: 2006
- Current tour: Challenge Tour
- Former tour: European Tour

Adam Gee (born 22 October 1980) is an English professional golfer.

== Amateur career ==
Gee was born in Carshalton, England. He was a relative latecomer to golf, not attempting the game for the first time until the age of 15. Despite this, he earned a golf scholarship to the University of North Carolina Wilmington, but opted to take a role as a club assistant on his return as he doubted his ability to compete as a professional. Gee finished runner-up at the 2006 Amateur Championship.

== Professional career ==
Gee eventually turned professional at the late age of 26, and began his career on the second-tier Challenge Tour. After four consistent seasons at this level, finishing between 40th and 65th every year, he came through the qualifying school at the end of 2010 to earn a position on the European Tour for 2011.

Gee pioneered a system of obtaining financial backing by offering rewards to members of the public in return for small donations. He has also written a regular blog for the Sky Sports website.

== Amateur wins ==
- 2002 Tillman Trophy
- 2005 Berkshire Trophy
- 2006 Lake Macquarie Amateur

== See also ==
- 2010 European Tour Qualifying School graduates
- 2013 European Tour Qualifying School graduates
