= Matthew Nixon =

English golfer (born 1989)

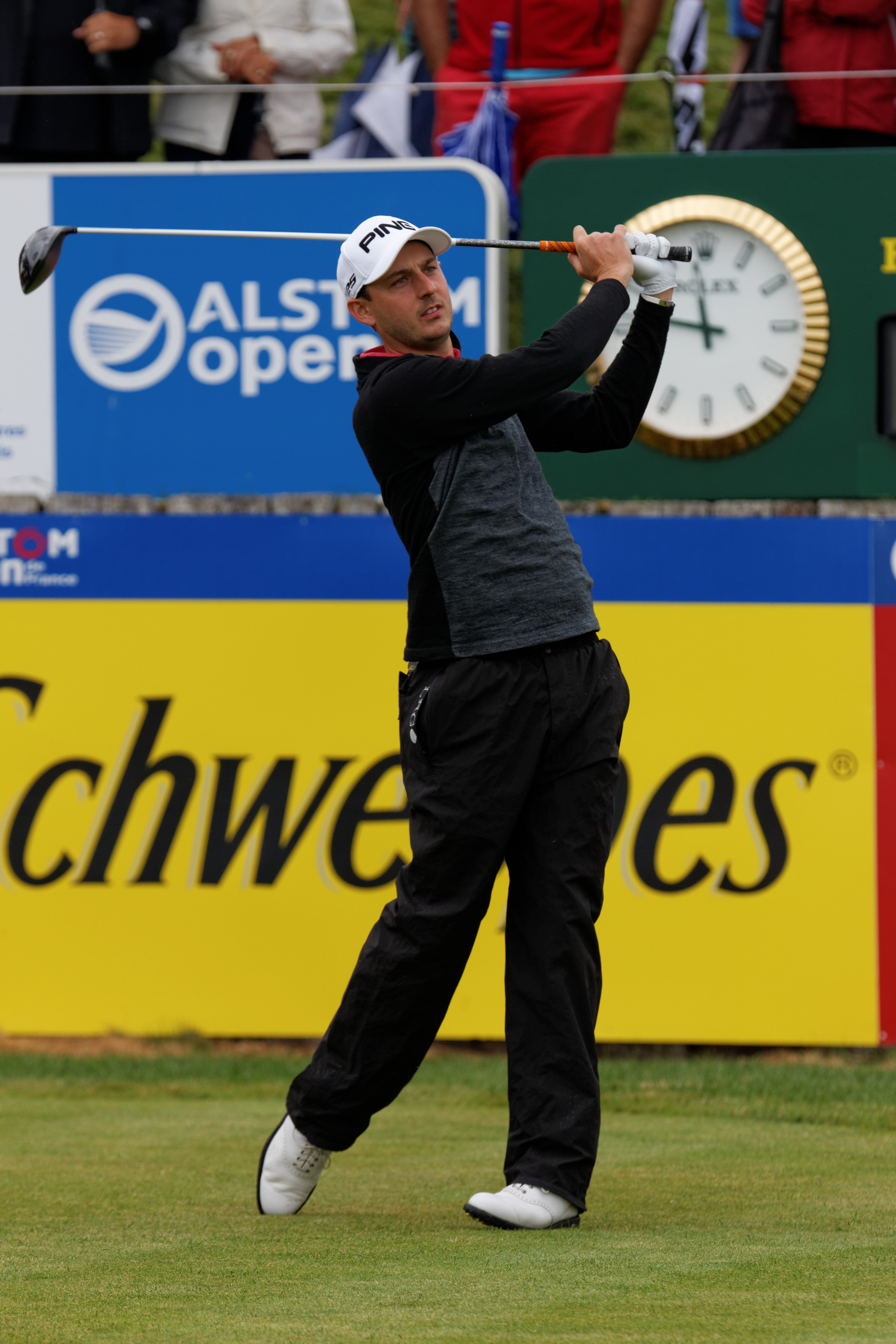

Personal information
- Nationality: England
- Born: 12 June 1989 (age 37) Manchester, England
- Height: 1.82 m (6 ft 0 in)
- Weight: 70 kg (150 lb; 11 st)

Career
- Sport: Golf
- Turned professional: 2010
- Current tour: European Tour
- Former tour: Challenge Tour

Matthew Nixon (born 12 June 1989) is an English professional golfer.

== Amateur career ==
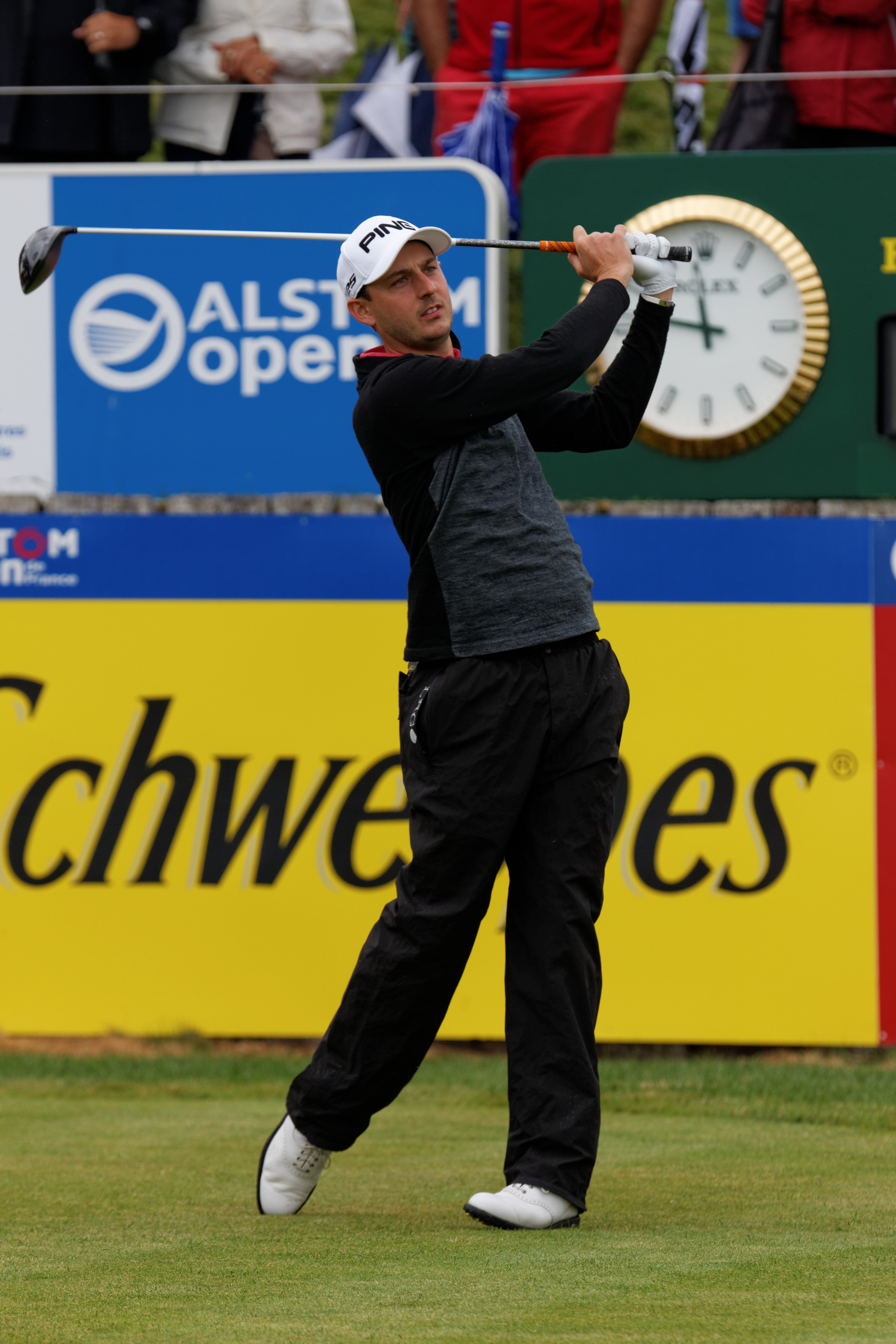
Matthew Nixon

Nixon was a top amateur golfer nationwide from an early age; he won the Boys Amateur Championship in 2006 at the age of 17, and played in the Jacques Léglise Trophy that year. He played for the national side from 2006 onwards, and was ranked as high as 14th in the World Amateur Golf Rankings. In the USA, he was ranked 7th in the Scratch Players World Amateur Ranking. He broke the course record at Pannal Golf Club, Harrogate, England on 24 August 2005, shooting 63, 9-under-par at age 16. He reached the semi-finals of The Amateur Championship in 2010, losing to the eventual winner Jin Jeong of South Korea.

== Professional career ==
Nixon entered the qualifying school for the European Tour in autumn of 2010, and came through all three stages to earn his playing rights for 2011, prompting him to turn professional. After a promising start to the season, he failed to make a cut between July and November but returned to Qualifying School at the end of the year to regain his card.

He also secured his European Tour card at Qualifying School in 2012, 2016 and 2017.

In 2018, Nixon had a strong year, finishing 13th at the Commercial Bank Qatar Masters, tied for 18th at the BMW International Open, ninth at the Porsche European Open and eighth at the Andalucía Valderrama Masters.

Nixon contributes a regular column to the Manchester Evening News.

== Amateur wins ==
- 2006 Boys Amateur Championship
- 2008 Rudersdal Open (Denmark)

== Team appearances ==
Amateur

- Jacques Léglise Trophy (representing Great Britain and Ireland): 2006
- St Andrews Trophy (representing Great Britain and Ireland): 2010

== See also ==
- 2010 European Tour Qualifying School graduates
- 2011 European Tour Qualifying School graduates
- 2012 European Tour Qualifying School graduates
- 2016 European Tour Qualifying School graduates
- 2017 European Tour Qualifying School graduates
