= 2005 European Tour Qualifying School graduates =

This is a list of the 32 players who earned their 2006 European Tour card through Q School in 2005.

Place	Player	European Tour starts	Cuts made	Notes
1	(England) Tom Whitehouse	28	12	1 Challenge Tour win; 17th in the Challenge Tour rankings
2	(England) Robert Rock	59	32	
3	(England) David Griffiths	27	12	
T4	(Sweden) Mattias Eliasson	90	30	
T4	(South Africa) Louis Oosthuizen	50	26	1 Sunshine Tour win
T4	(England) Shaun P. Webster	78	40	1 Challenge Tour win
7	(England) David Dixon	62	28	
8	(England) Iain Pyman	231	92	5 Challenge Tour wins
T9	(Sweden) Leif Westerberg	43	21	1 Challenge Tour win
T9	(Sweden) Jarmo Sandelin	275	170	5 European Tour wins
T9	(Brazil) Alexandre Rocha	5	2	1 Tour de las Américas win
T9	(Italy) Michele Reale	95	38	2 Challenge Tour wins
T9	(Sweden) Johan Edfors	39	21	2 Challenge Tour wins
T14	(England) Ross Fisher	10	5	18th in the Challenge Tour rankings
T14	(Spain) Francisco Valera	71	32	2 Challenge Tour wins
T14	(England) Oliver Whiteley	6	3	
T17	(Argentina) Miguel Ángel Carballo	3	2	
T17	(Chile) Felipe Aguilar	1	1	1 Tour de las Américas win
T19	(South Africa) Darren Fichardt	123	67	2 European Tour wins; 4 Sunshine Tour wins
T19	(Australia) David Bransdon	23	14	
T19	(Australia) Matthew Millar	2	0	
T19	(Sweden) Christian Nilsson	2	0	
T23	(Sweden) Wilhelm Schauman	7	2	
T23	(England) Gary Clark	111	53	
T23	(Sweden) Henrik Nyström	158	75	
T23	(South Africa) Warren Abery	14	7	4 Sunshine Tour wins
T23	(Spain) Santiago Luna	502	292	1 European Tour win
T23	(France) Benoît Teilleria	90	43	
T23	(England) Kieran Staunton	0	0	
T23	(New Zealand) Stephen Scahill	208	106	2 Challenge Tour wins
T23	(Sweden) Anders Sjöstrand	0	0	
T23	(Finland) Tuomas Tuovinen	3	0	

2006 European Tour rookie

== 2006 results ==
Player	Starts	Cuts made	Best finish	Money list rank	Earnings (€)
(England) Tom Whitehouse	24	16	T7	95	250,952
(England) Robert Rock	21	11	T5	114	208,637
(England) David Griffiths	21	14	T3	107	217,166
(Sweden) Mattias Eliasson	21	14	T3	75	314,018
(South Africa) Louis Oosthuizen	21	11	T2	93	256,466
(England) Shaun P. Webster	19	6	T10	194	41,939
(England) David Dixon	25	12	T6	151	101,142
(England) Iain Pyman	19	6	T21	197	39,362
(Sweden) Leif Westerberg	23	15	5	131	165,150
(Sweden) Jarmo Sandelin	26	16	T2 (x2)	44	568,046
(Brazil) Alexandre Rocha*	24	15	6	125	179,878
(Italy) Michele Reale	17	4	T26	226	22,431
(Sweden) Johan Edfors	24	18	Win (x3)	10	1,505,583
(England) Ross Fisher*	29	18	T3	66	370,725
(Spain) Francisco Valera	18	11	T15	164	88,366
(England) Oliver Whiteley*	20	6	T13	186	50,524
(Argentina) Miguel Ángel Carballo*	19	9	T20	166	86,152
(Chile) Felipe Aguilar*	18	10	T11	158	95,819
(South Africa) Darren Fichardt	18	11	3	69	343,412
(Australia) David Bransdon*	26	14	T8	124	185,268
(Australia) Matthew Millar*	25	15	T5	115	207,386
(Sweden) Christian Nilsson*	20	15	T4	101	226,789
(Sweden) Wilhelm Schauman*	12	4	T41	235	15,880
(England) Gary Clark	21	10	T24	170	76,133
(Sweden) Henrik Nyström	15	3	T2	140	131,395
(South Africa) Warren Abery*	21	7	T7	165	87,244
(Spain) Santiago Luna	15	7	T10	169	77,652
(France) Benoît Teilleria	20	7	5	163	88,472
(England) Kieran Staunton*	17	3	T28	208	28,212
(New Zealand) Stephen Scahill	19	7	T18	188	50,258
(Sweden) Anders Sjöstrand*	16	3	T39	239	14,201
(Finland) Tuomas Tuovinen*	14	2	51	277	6,675

* European Tour rookie in 2006
T = Tied
The player retained his European Tour card for 2007 (finished inside the top 118).
The player did not retain his European Tour card for 2007, but retained conditional status (finished between 119–150).
The player did not retain his European Tour card for 2007 (finished outside the top 150).

== Winners on the European Tour in 2006 ==
No.	Date	Player	Tournament	Winning score	Margin of victory	Runners-up
1	19 Mar	(Sweden) Johan Edfors	TCL Classic	−25 (66-66-63-68=263)	1 stroke	(Australia) Andrew Buckle
2	14 May	(Sweden) Johan Edfors (2)	Quinn Direct British Masters	−11 (68-69-70-70=277)	1 stroke	(England) Gary Emerson (Scotland) Stephen Gallacher (Sweden) Jarmo Sandelin
3	16 Jul	(Sweden) Johan Edfors (3)	Barclays Scottish Open	−13 (65-69-74-63=271)	2 strokes	(England) Luke Donald (Argentina) Andrés Romero (South Africa) Charl Schwartzel

== Runners-up on the European Tour in 2006 ==
No.	Date	Player	Tournament	Winner	Winning score	Runner-up score
1	11 Dec 2005	(South Africa) Louis Oosthuizen	Dunhill Championship	(South Africa) Ernie Els	−14 (71-67-68-68=274)	−11 (69-67-71-70=277)
2	7 May	(Sweden) Jarmo Sandelin	Telecom Italia Open	(Italy) Francesco Molinari	−23 (68-65-67-65=265)	−19 (69-68-67-65=269)
3	14 May	(Sweden) Jarmo Sandelin (2)	Quinn Direct British Masters	(Sweden) Johan Edfors	−11 (68-69-70-70=277)	−10 (67-71-70-70=278)
4	18 Jun	(Sweden) Henrik Nyström	Aa St Omer Open	(Argentina) César Monasterio	−10 (68-68-71-67=274)	−9 (69-65-68-73=275)

== See also ==
- 2005 Challenge Tour graduates
- 2006 European Tour
