= Lee Slattery =

English professional golfer

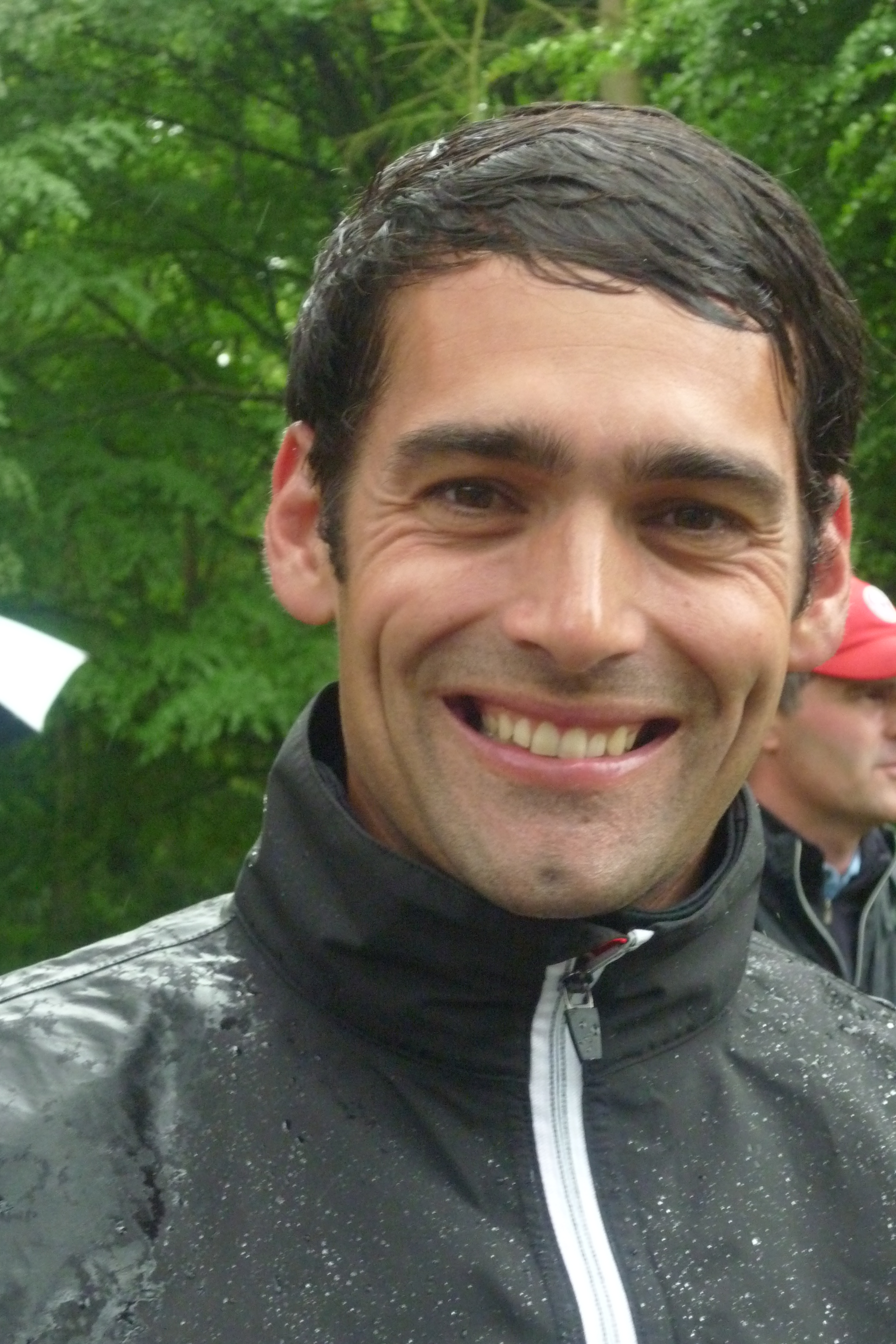
- Slattery in 2010

Personal information
- Full name: Lee Andrew Slattery
- Nationality: England
- Born: 3 August 1978 (age 48) Southport, Merseyside, England
- Height: 5 ft 11 in (1.80 m)
- Weight: 174 lb (79 kg; 12.4 st)

Career
- Sport: Golf
- Turned professional: 1998
- Current tour: Challenge Tour
- Former tours: European Tour; Sunshine Tour; PGA EuroPro Tour
- Professional wins: 7

Number of wins by tour
- European Tour: 2
- Challenge Tour: 2
- Other: 3

Best results in major championships
- Masters Tournament: DNP
- PGA Championship: DNP
- U.S. Open: T57: 2016
- The Open Championship: T26: 2006

Achievements and awards
- Challenge Tour Rankings winner: 2004

Lee Andrew Slattery (born 3 August 1978) is an English professional golfer who plays on the European Tour. He has won twice on the tour, the 2011 Bankia Madrid Masters and the 2015 M2M Russian Open.

== Professional career ==
Slattery turned professional in 1998 and spent his early career playing in minor tournaments on mini-tours in the United Kingdom. He won the Tour Championship on the PGA EuroPro Tour in 2001. At the end of 2000 he moved to South Africa to play on the Sunshine Tour during the northern hemisphere winter. He was stuck down by glandular fever in 2002, which forced him to take an extended break from the game.

Having returned to golf in late 2003, Slattery resumed his career in South Africa before returning to the PGA EuroPro Tour at the start of 2004. He won twice early in the season, before getting the chance to play in the North West Challenge on the second tier Challenge Tour. He finished as runner up there and as a result further opportunities on the tour were forthcoming, which he made full use of. He finished tied for 3rd the next tournament, and went on record three other podium finishes including a win in Sweden at the Telia Grand Prix. He ended the season on top of the Challenge Tour Rankings to graduate to the elite European Tour for 2005.

Until 2011, Slattery had yet to establish himself on the European Tour, finishing inside the top 100 on the Order of Merit just once, in 2006. He missed out on retaining his card in 2007 by just €77, but immediately regained it via the end of season qualifying school. He lost his card in 2009, but regained it by finishing in the top 20 of the 2010 Challenge Tour rankings.

On 9 October 2011, he won the Bankia Madrid Masters tournament with a 15 under par total with top players including world number one Luke Donald in the field. It was his maiden European Tour title. After taking a two stroke advantage into the final round, it soon disappeared after a shaky start on the front nine with two bogeys early on. He recovered on the back nine though with a run of four birdies in five holes and despite a double bogey at the last, Slattery prevailed by a single stroke from Lorenzo Gagli. He secured his tour card for the 2012 season with this win.

In 2014 he finished 111th in the Race to Dubai, one place and €7,318 short of retaining his European Tour card, leaving him with limited status for the 2015 season. He regained full status by winning the Russian Open in September, his second European Tour title.

== Professional wins (7) ==
=== European Tour wins (2) ===
No.	Date	Tournament	Winning score	Margin of victory	Runner-up
1	9 Oct 2011	Bankia Madrid Masters	−15 (67-66-69-71=273)	1 stroke	(Italy) Lorenzo Gagli
2	6 Sep 2015	M2M Russian Open	−15 (66-67-67-69=269)	1 stroke	(Argentina) Estanislao Goya

=== Challenge Tour wins (2) ===
No.	Date	Tournament	Winning score	Margin of victory	Runner-up
1	12 Sep 2004	Telia Grand Prix	−3 (66-75-66-74=281)	1 stroke	(Sweden) Hampus Von Post
2	30 May 2010	Telenet Trophy	−21 (64-68-68-67=267)	4 strokes	(France) Édouard Dubois

=== PGA EuroPro Tour wins (2) ===
No.	Date	Tournament	Winning score	Margin of victory	Runner-up
1	12 Jun 2004	Pokermillion.com European Masters	−11 (67-73-65=205)	2 strokes	(Scotland) Paul Doherty
2	1 Jul 2004	888.com Masters	−9 (69-68-70=207)	Playoff	(England) Darren Charlton

=== EuroPro Tour wins (1) ===
No.	Date	Tournament	Winning score	Margin of victory	Runner-up
1	20 Oct 2001	EuroPro Tour Championship	−9 (66-67=133)	1 stroke	(Scotland) Graham Fox

== Results in major championships ==
Tournament	2006	2007	2008	2009
Masters Tournament				
U.S. Open				
The Open Championship	T26			
PGA Championship				

Tournament	2010	2011	2012	2013	2014	2015	2016	2017	2018
Masters Tournament									
U.S. Open			CUT				T57		
The Open Championship			T64						
PGA Championship									

Tournament	2019
Masters Tournament	
PGA Championship	
U.S. Open	CUT
The Open Championship	

Did not play

CUT = missed the half-way cut
"T" = tied

== Results in World Golf Championships ==
Tournament	2011	2012
Match Play		
Championship		
Invitational		T8
Champions	T33	

Top 10
Did not play

"T" = Tied

== Team appearances ==
Professional

- European Championships (representing Great Britain): 2018

== See also ==
- 2007 European Tour Qualifying School graduates
- 2010 Challenge Tour graduates
