= Carlos del Moral =

Spanish golfer

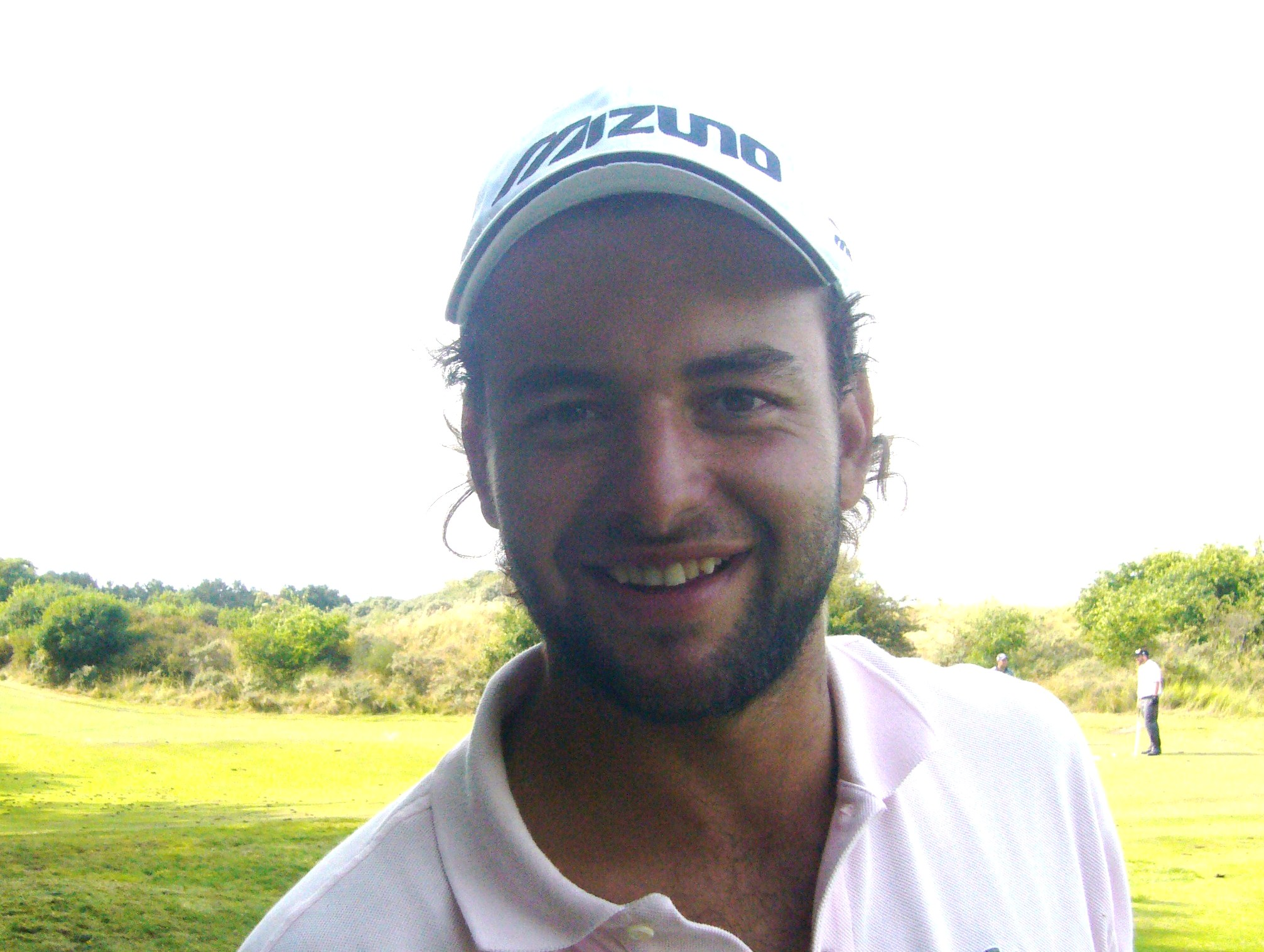
- del Moral at the 2009 KLM Open

Personal information
- Full name: Carlos del Moral Barilari
- Nationality: Spain
- Born: 30 August 1985 (age 41) Valencia, Spain
- Height: 1.83 m (6 ft 0 in)

Career
- Sport: Golf
- College: University of Oklahoma
- Turned professional: 2005
- Current tour: Challenge Tour
- Former tour: European Tour
- Professional wins: 2

Number of wins by tour
- Challenge Tour: 2

Carlos del Moral Barilari (born 30 August 1985) is a Spanish professional golfer.

== Amateur and early professional career ==
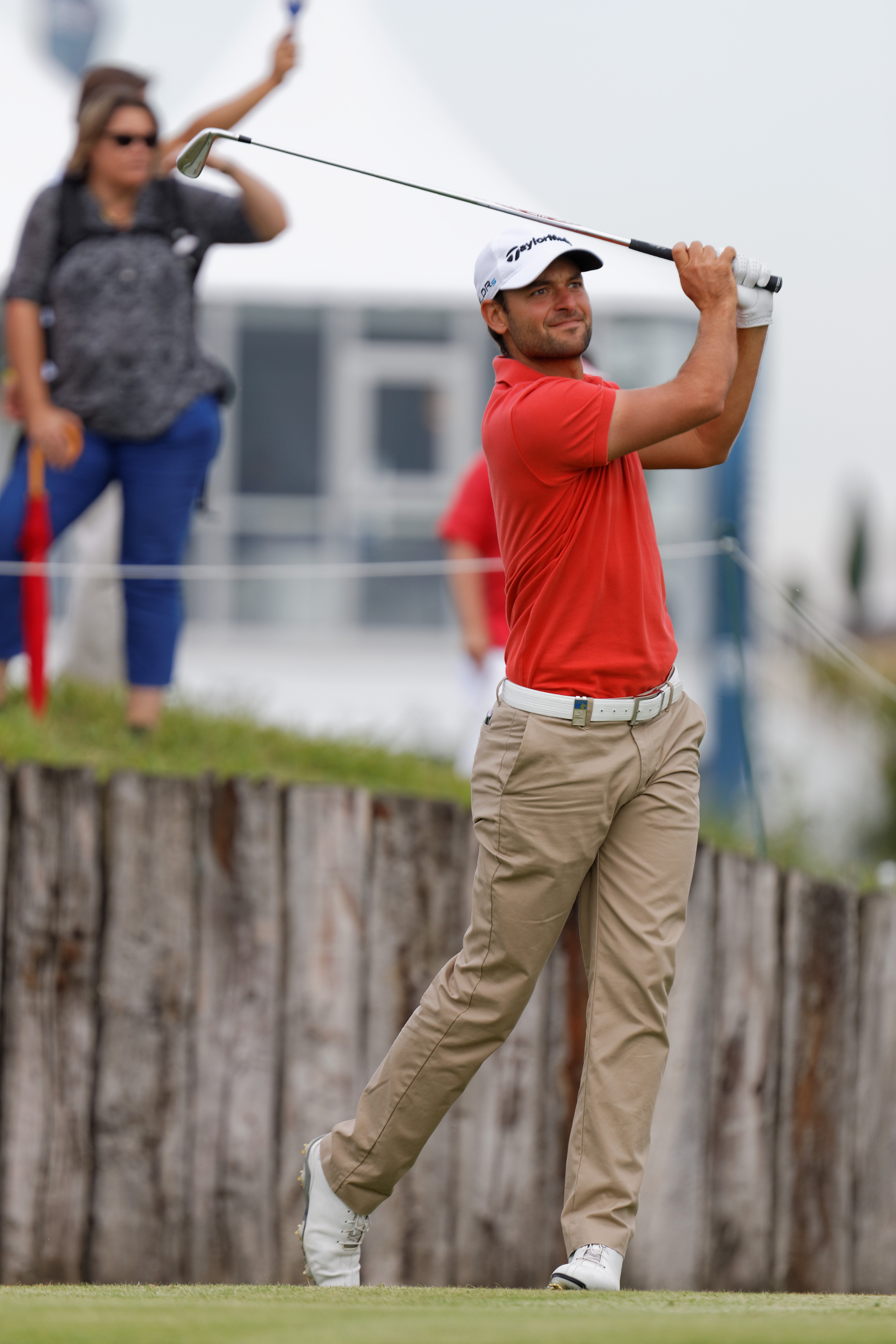
Carlos del Moral

Born in Valencia, he was a successful junior, winning the Carris Trophy and the Duke of York Young Champions Trophy before taking up a scholarship at the University of Oklahoma, where he played on the golf team alongside Anthony Kim. Del Moral turned professional in 2005, and joined the second-tier Challenge Tour for the following season, soon winning the Texbond Open in Italy and ending the year 51st in the rankings. He spent the following two seasons gaining experience at Challenge Tour level, while playing occasionally on the main European Tour, with a best finish of 7th at the 2008 Madrid Masters. At the end of the season, he finished in a tie for 2nd at the Qualifying School, earning him full playing rights for the 2009 European Tour season.

== 2009 season ==
After missing the cut in his first tournament as a full European Tour player, the Sportsbet Australian Masters, del Moral then enjoyed a consistent start to his season, making eleven of the next fourteen cuts, including three consecutive top-20s in events in Spain, Portugal and China. However, his form evaporated over the summer months, and he ended the year making just two of his last six cuts. Despite having recorded eight top-30 finishes over the year, del Moral had failed to convert any of those into top-10s, and as a result finished outside the important top 115 players in the money list, who retained their tour card. He suffered further disappointment when he was unable to repeat his performance at qualifying school, finishing outside the thirty qualifiers.

== 2010 season ==
Although he had failed to retain a full card, del Moral's 2009 performance did gain him entry to some of the smaller European Tour events in 2010, and so he split his early season between the European and Challenge Tours. However, his inconsistent form continued, and he did not record a top-10 finish on either Tour prior to the start of July. At that point, a switch to the Challenge Tour full-time produced an upsurge in form, culminating in a second professional win of his career, at the inaugural M2M Russian Challenge Cup in September. That win gained him entry to the season-ending Grand Final, where he was just unable to get the required result, ending the season 21st in the rankings. However, he put the disappointment behind him by once again graduating from the qualifying school.

== Amateur wins ==
- 2001 Spanish National Under-18 Championship
- 2002 Carris Trophy, Duke of York Young Champions Trophy

== Professional wins (2) ==
=== Challenge Tour wins (2) ===
No.	Date	Tournament	Winning score	Margin of victory	Runner(s)-up
1	15 Jul 2006	Texbond Open	−18 (69-68-63-70=270)	Playoff	(England) Lee S. James
2	19 Sep 2010	M2M Russian Challenge Cup	−11 (72-68-71-66=277)	1 stroke	(England) Tommy Fleetwood, (England) Matt Ford, (Denmark) Thorbjørn Olesen

Challenge Tour playoff record (1–0)

No.	Year	Tournament	Opponent	Result
1	2006	Texbond Open	(England) Lee S. James	Won with birdie on third extra hole

== Team appearances ==
Amateur

- European Boys' Team Championship (representing Spain): 2002 (winners), 2003

== See also ==
- 2008 European Tour Qualifying School graduates
- 2010 European Tour Qualifying School graduates
- 2012 European Tour Qualifying School graduates
- 2013 European Tour Qualifying School graduates
