= San Roque Club =

Country club in San Roque, Andalusia, Spain

The San Roque Club
- Interactive map of The San Roque Club
- 36.267°N 5.338°W

Club information
- Location: Andalusia, Spain
- Established: 1990
- Type: private
- Tota holes: 36
- Tournaments: Open de España
- Website: www.sanroqueclub.com

Old Course
- Designed by: Dave Thomas
- Par: 72
- Length: 6,494 metres

New Course
- Designed by: Perry Dye
- Par: 72
- Length: 6,626 metres

The San Roque Club is a country club and Gated Community located in San Roque, in the Andalusia region in Southern Spain, a few miles from Gibraltar.

The Old course was designed by Dave Thomas and constructed in 1990. Renovations to the Old course were completed in November 2020. The New course was added in 2002, and was designed by Perry Dye.

The club hosted the Open de España in 2005 and 2006, and also hosts the Asprey Cup horse race. The chairman of the golf club was Seve Ballesteros.
