= 2012 European Tour Qualifying School graduates =

This is a list of the 28 players who earned their 2013 European Tour card through Q School in 2012.

| Place | Player | European Tour starts | Cuts made | Notes |
|---|---|---|---|---|
| 1 | (England) John Parry | 79 | 40 | 1 European Tour win |
| 2 | (Sweden) Mikael Lundberg | 237 | 110 | 2 European Tour wins |
| 3 | (England) Andy Sullivan | 26 | 10 | |
| T4 | (Argentina) Estanislao Goya | 115 | 63 | 1 European Tour win |
| T4 | (Finland) Peter Erofejeff | 0 | 0 | |
| T4 | (Germany) Moritz Lampert | 2 | 0 | |
| T7 | (Australia) Daniel Gaunt | 71 | 26 | 1 Challenge Tour win |
| T7 | (England) Matthew Southgate | 15 | 5 | |
| T9 | (Spain) Eduardo de la Riva | 43 | 15 | 1 Challenge Tour win |
| T9 | (England) Richard McEvoy | 193 | 79 | 1 Challenge Tour win |
| T9 | (England) Matthew Nixon | 38 | 11 | |
| T9 | (France) Anthony Snobeck | 39 | 12 | 2 Challenge Tour wins |
| T9 | (Finland) Mikko Korhonen | 31 | 17 | |
| T14 | (Italy) Matteo Delpodio | 4 | 2 | |
| T14 | (Sweden) Björn Åkesson | 6 | 3 | |
| T16 | (England) Chris Lloyd | 6 | 3 | |
| T16 | (Sweden) Michael Jonzon | 380 | 174 | 2 European Tour wins |
| T16 | (Republic of Ireland) David Higgins | 182 | 83 | 3 Challenge Tour wins |
| T16 | (Denmark) Morten Ørum Madsen | 4 | 2 | 19th in the Challenge Tour rankings |
| T20 | (England) Sam Little | 232 | 103 | 5 Challenge Tour wins |
| T20 | (Scotland) Callum Macaulay | 43 | 20 | |
| T20 | (Sweden) Oscar Florén | 62 | 26 | 1 Challenge Tour win |
| T20 | (Sweden) Joakim Lagergren | 23 | 10 | |
| T24 | (France) Alexander Lévy | 2 | 0 | |
| T24 | (Australia) Scott Arnold | 10 | 1 | 1 PGA Tour of Australasia win |
| T24 | (Denmark) Lasse Jensen | 10 | 4 | |
| T24 | (Spain) Carlos del Moral | 112 | 57 | 2 Challenge Tour wins |
| T24 | (Scotland) Gary Orr | 468 | 326 | 2 European Tour wins |

2013 European Tour rookie

== 2013 Results ==
| Player | Starts | Cuts made | Best finish | Money list rank | Earnings (€) |
|---|---|---|---|---|---|
| (England) John Parry | 24 | 12 | T4 | 77 | 388,415 |
| (Sweden) Mikael Lundberg | 23 | 9 | T15 | 168 | 69,389 |
| (England) Andy Sullivan | 26 | 13 | T3 | 98 | 279,999 |
| (Argentina) Estanislao Goya | 22 | 10 | T14 | 174 | 63,149 |
| (Finland) Peter Erofejeff* | 18 | 5 | T59 | 230 | 14,970 |
| (Germany) Moritz Lampert* | 22 | 4 | T27 | 184 | 45,251 |
| (Australia) Daniel Gaunt | 15 | 5 | T10 | 200 | 32,698 |
| (England) Matthew Southgate | 20 | 9 | T8 | 175 | 62,367 |
| (Spain) Eduardo de la Riva | 27 | 17 | T2 | 58 | 593,361 |
| (England) Richard McEvoy | 22 | 10 | T15 | 150 | 108,223 |
| (England) Matthew Nixon | 26 | 14 | T2 | 105 | 252,179 |
| (France) Anthony Snobeck | 21 | 12 | T28 | 163 | 86,141 |
| (Finland) Mikko Korhonen | 16 | 15 | T8 | 124 | 187,399 |
| (Italy) Matteo Delpodio* | 26 | 11 | T8 | 143 | 118,253 |
| (Sweden) Björn Åkesson* | 25 | 9 | T5 | 142 | 125,117 |
| (England) Chris Lloyd* | 23 | 11 | T5 | 153 | 103,396 |
| (Sweden) Michael Jonzon | 16 | 6 | T11 | 179 | 55,693 |
| (Republic of Ireland) David Higgins | 22 | 12 | T2 | 115 | 215,356 |
| (Denmark) Morten Ørum Madsen* | 23 | 15 | T2 | 81 | 357,417 |
| (England) Sam Little | 22 | 10 | T8 | 165 | 77,804 |
| (Scotland) Callum Macaulay | 20 | 5 | T27 | 191 | 39,125 |
| (Sweden) Oscar Florén | 22 | 12 | T24 | 151 | 104,474 |
| (Sweden) Joakim Lagergren | 20 | 12 | T17 | 144 | 117,522 |
| (France) Alexander Lévy* | 24 | 10 | 3 | 109 | 240,540 |
| (Australia) Scott Arnold* | 16 | 5 | T39 | 221 | 20,763 |
| (Denmark) Lasse Jensen* | 20 | 8 | T12 | 171 | 64,128 |
| (Spain) Carlos del Moral | 16 | 4 | T14 | 222 | 20,161 |
| (Scotland) Gary Orr | 9 | 5 | T10 | n/a | 31,796 |

* European Tour rookie in 2013
T = Tied
The player retained his European Tour card for 2014 (finished inside the top 110).
The player did not retain his European Tour card for 2014, but retained conditional status (finished between 111–145).
The player did not retain his European Tour card for 2014 (finished outside the top 145).

Lundberg, Goya, Korhonen, and del Moral regained their cards for 2014 through Q School.

== Runners-up on the European Tour in 2013 ==
No Qualifying School graduates won on the European Tour in 2013; however, Peter Uihlein and Jin Jeong, both of whom missed the cut at Q School, won at the Madeira Islands Open - Portugal - BPI and the ISPS Handa Perth International, respectively. Uihlein finished 14th in the Race to Dubai and was named Sir Henry Cotton Rookie of the Year.

| No. | Date | Player | Tournament | Winner | Winning score | Runner-up score |
|---|---|---|---|---|---|---|
| 1 | 9 Dec 2012 | (Spain) Eduardo de la Riva lost in three-man playoff | The Nelson Mandela Championship | (Scotland) Scott Jamieson | −7 (66-57=123) | −7 (62-61=123) |
| 2 | 19 May | (Denmark) Morten Ørum Madsen | Madeira Islands Open | (United States) Peter Uihlein | −15 (72-64-69-68=273) | −13 (72-69-67-67=275) |
| 3 | 28 Jul | (England) Matthew Nixon | M2M Russian Open | (Northern Ireland) Michael Hoey | −16 (70-67-65-70=272) | −12 (69-70-68-69=276) |
| 4 | 22 Sep | (Republic of Ireland) David Higgins | Italian Open Lindt | (France) Julien Quesne | −12 (70-68-71-67=276) | −11 (67-69-73-68=277) |

== See also ==
- 2012 Challenge Tour graduates
- 2013 European Tour
