= Sam Little (golfer) =

English golfer and sports agent

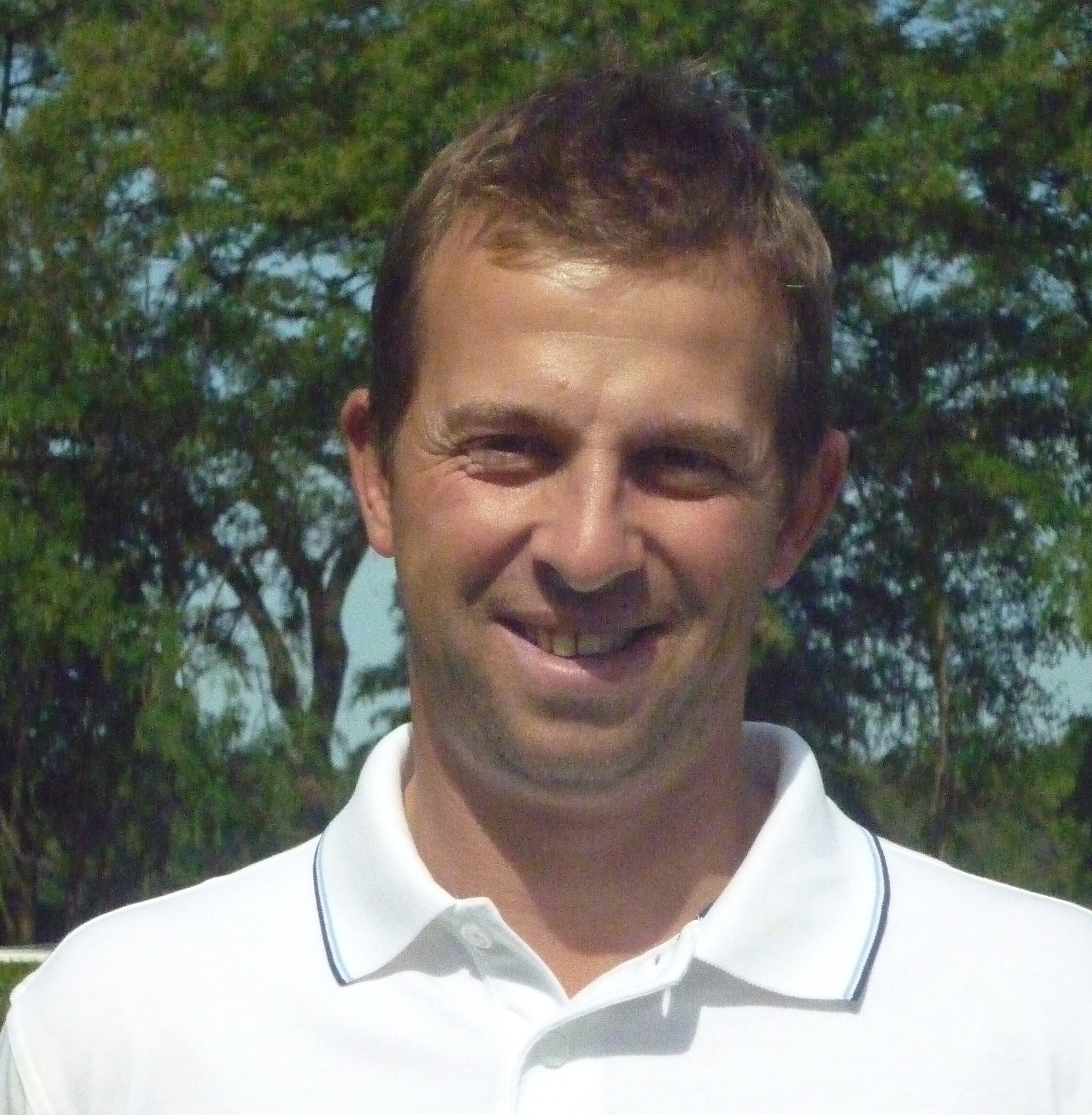
- Little at the 2011 Telenet Trophy

Personal information
- Nationality: England
- Born: 31 August 1975 (age 51) London, England
- Height: 1.85 m (6 ft 1 in)
- Weight: 83 kg (183 lb; 13.1 st)
- Spouse: Maria (m. 2006)
- Children: 4

Career
- Sport: Golf
- Turned professional: 1997
- Former tours: European Tour; Challenge Tour
- Professional wins: 5

Number of wins by tour
- Challenge Tour: 5 (Tied-8th all-time)

Best results in major championships
- Masters Tournament: DNP
- PGA Championship: DNP
- U.S. Open: DNP
- The Open Championship: CUT: 2006

Sam Little (born 31 August 1975) is an English professional golfer and sports agent. He won five times on the Challenge Tour.

== Early life ==
Little was born in London, England, and is Jewish and has been a member of Hendon Reform Synagogue.

== Professional career ==
In 1997, Little turned professional. He joined the Challenge Tour in 1999, where he recorded his first win in 2001. In 2004 he won for the second time at that level, and graduated to the European Tour at the end of the season via qualifying school. He became renowned for last-gasp performances to maintain his Tour playing rights, ending narrowly inside the top 115 qualifiers in 2005, 2008 and 2009, and finishing runner-up in the final tournament of 2007 to move up to 76th in the Order of Merit from outside the top 170. This remains his best season-end finish.

After the 2010 season Little lost his playing rights on the European Tour, having finished 182nd, and returned to the Challenge Tour.

In 2011, Little won three events from mid-September to mid-October, the M2M Russian Challenge Cup, the Allianz Golf Open Grand Toulouse, and the Roma Golf Open, to regain his European Tour card for the remainder of 2011 and 2012.

Little served on the Maccabi GB Golf Management Team for the 2013 Maccabiah Games.

In 2014 he became a sports agent.

== Personal life ==
Little has a wife, Maria, and four children including twin girls. His brother Jamie is also a professional golfer who has played on the European Tour and Challenge Tour.

== Professional wins (5) ==
=== Challenge Tour wins (5) ===
No.	Date	Tournament	Winning score	Margin of victory	Runner(s)-up
1	2 Sep 2001	Formby Hall Challenge	−12 (71-72-64-69=276)	1 stroke	(England) Grant Hamerton
2	17 Jul 2004	Texbond Open	−19 (71-65-67-66=269)	3 strokes	(Sweden) Henrik Nyström, (Italy) Massimo Scarpa
3	18 Sep 2011	M2M Russian Challenge Cup	−11 (74-69-68-66=277)	1 stroke	(England) Andrew Johnston
4	25 Sep 2011	Allianz Golf Open Grand Toulouse	−16 (66-68-66-68=268)	1 stroke	(Republic of Ireland) Simon Thornton
5	16 Oct 2011	Roma Golf Open	−11 (66-68-71-68=273)	Playoff	(Sweden) Pelle Edberg

Challenge Tour playoff record (1–0)

No.	Year	Tournament	Opponent	Result
1	2011	Roma Golf Open	(Sweden) Pelle Edberg	Won with par on fourth extra hole

== Results in major championships ==
Tournament	2006
The Open Championship	CUT

Note: Little only played in The Open Championship.
CUT = missed the half-way cut

== See also ==
- 2006 European Tour Qualifying School graduates
- 2011 Challenge Tour graduates
- 2012 European Tour Qualifying School graduates
- List of golfers with most Challenge Tour wins
- List of golfers to achieve a three-win promotion from the Challenge Tour
