= Madrid Masters (golf) =

Bankia Madrid Masters
Tournament information
- Location: Alcalá de Henares, Spain
- Established: 2008
- Course: El Encín Golf Hotel
- Par: 72
- Length: 7,561 yards (6,914 m)
- Tour: European Tour
- Format: Stroke play
- Prize fund: €1,000,000
- Month played: October
- Final year: 2011

Tournament record score
- Aggregate: 263 Ross McGowan (2009)
- To par: −25 as above

Final champion
- (England) Lee Slattery

Location map
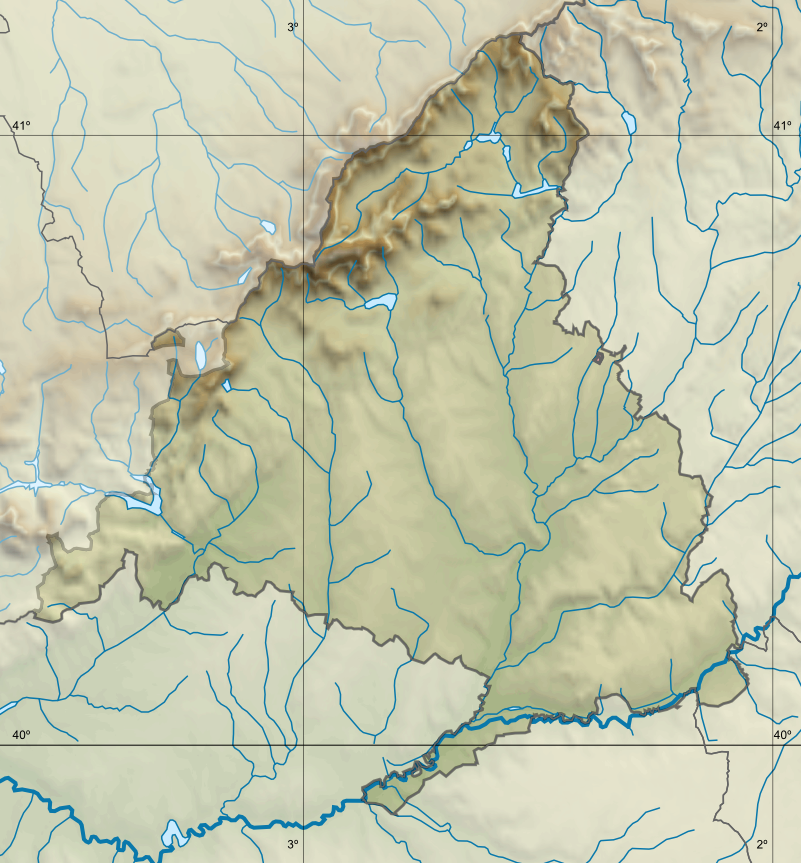
- Location in Spain Location in the Community of Madrid

The Bankia Madrid Masters was a European Tour golf tournament that was held for the first time in October 2008, taking the slot formerly used by the Open de Madrid. The 2011 event was held at the El Encín Golf Hotel. In 2011, it was sponsored by the Spanish banking group, Bankia. Bankia's financial problems resulted in the 2012 tournament being cancelled when a replacement sponsor could not be found.

== Winners ==
Year	Winner	Score	To par	Margin of victory	Runner-up	Winner's share (€)	Ref.
Madrid Masters
2012	Cancelled due to lack of funding						
Bankia Madrid Masters
2011	(England) Lee Slattery	273	−15	1 stroke	(Italy) Lorenzo Gagli	166,660	
Madrid Masters
2010	(England) Luke Donald	267	−21	1 stroke	(Wales) Rhys Davies	250,000	
2009	(England) Ross McGowan	263	−25	3 strokes	(Finland) Mikko Ilonen	250,000	
2008	(South Africa) Charl Schwartzel	265	−19	3 strokes	(Argentina) Ricardo González	166,660	
