= Fredrik Widmark =

Swedish professional golfer

Personal information
- Full name: Hans Fredrik Widmark
- Nationality: Sweden
- Born: 20 November 1975 (age 50) Hässleholm, Sweden
- Height: 1.88 m (6 ft 2 in)
- Weight: 82 kg (181 lb; 12.9 st)

Career
- Sport: Golf
- College: Western Texas College
- Turned professional: 1998
- Former tour: European Tour
- Professional wins: 8

Number of wins by tour
- Challenge Tour: 3
- Other: 5

Fredrik Widmark (born 20 November 1975 in Hässleholm) is a Swedish professional golfer.

== Career ==
A graduate from the U.S. college system where he won five times, Widmark turned professional in 1998 and played predominantly on Europe's second tier Challenge Tour where he won three tournaments. Graduated from the Challenge Tour in 2002 when he finished 14th on the end of season rankings. A 66 (-7) in the final round, the best round of the tournament, gave him his maiden Challenge Tour victory in the 2002 Izki Challenge de España but had to wait until the closing weeks of the season before three more top ten finishes secured his place in the top 20.

After a disappointing 2004, two Challenge Tour victories in 2005, at the Riu Tikida Hotels Moroccan Classic and the Texbond Open, helped him to third place on the final 2005 Rankings and to a career best year-end 189th on the Volvo Order of Merit.

Finished 5th twice on the European Tour, in the 2005 BMW Russian Open and the 2008 Madeira Island Open.

== Professional wins (8) ==
=== Challenge Tour wins (3) ===
No.	Date	Tournament	Winning score	Margin of victory	Runner(s)-up
1	26 May 2002	Izki Challenge de España	−16 (67-70-73-66=276)	1 stroke	(Sweden) Raimo Sjöberg
2	29 May 2005	Riu Tikida Hotels Moroccan Classic	−15 (66-70-63-70=269)	Playoff	(England) Gary Clark, (England) Oliver Whiteley
3	16 Jul 2005	Texbond Open	−19 (65-70-68-66=269)	2 strokes	(Northern Ireland) Michael Hoey, (Scotland) Marc Warren

Challenge Tour playoff record (1–0)

No.	Year	Tournament	Opponents	Result
1	2005	Riu Tikida Hotels Moroccan Classic	(England) Gary Clark, (England) Oliver Whiteley	Won with par on first extra hole

=== Nordic Golf League wins (4) ===
No.	Date	Tournament	Winning score	Margin of victory	Runner(s)-up
1	6 Jun 1999	Stavanger Open	−7 (67-74-68=209)	2 strokes	(Sweden) Johan Necander
2	27 Jun 1999	Vår Bank & Försäkringar Open	+1 (72-72-73=217)	1 stroke	(Norway) Morten Haerås
3	26 Sep 1999	Tomelilla Open	−11 (70-67-71=208)	5 strokes	(Sweden) Claes Hovstadius, (Sweden) Björn Pettersson
4	2 Sep 2001	SM Match	19 holes		(Sweden) Yngve Nilsson

=== Swedish Golf Tour wins (1) ===
No.	Date	Tournament	Winning score	Margin of victory	Runner-up
1	27 Sep 1998	AP Parts Motoman Open	−11 (71-66-68=205)	2 strokes	(Sweden) Jonas Karlsson

== See also ==
- 2005 Challenge Tour graduates
