= Jordi García Pinto =

Spanish professional golfer (born 1990)

Personal information
- Nationality: Spain
- Born: 14 February 1990 (age 36) Girona, Spain
- Height: 1.80 m (5 ft 11 in)
- Weight: 69 kg (152 lb; 10.9 st)

Career
- Sport: Golf
- Turned professional: 2008
- Current tour: Challenge Tour
- Former tour: European Tour
- Professional wins: 2

Number of wins by tour
- Challenge Tour: 2

Jordi García Pinto (born 14 February 1990) is a Spanish professional golfer.

García Pinto was born in Girona, Spain. He turned professional in 2008.

García Pinto played on the Challenge Tour in 2012, finishing 53rd on the money list. He won the second event of the 2013 season, the Barclays Kenya Open. He uses his full name to distinguish himself from fellow Spanish golfer Jordi García del Moral.

== Professional wins (2) ==
=== Challenge Tour wins (2) ===
No.	Date	Tournament	Winning score	Margin of victory	Runner-up
1	17 Feb 2013	Barclays Kenya Open	−12 (69-66-68-69=272)	1 stroke	(Netherlands) Tim Sluiter
2	15 Jun 2014	Najeti Hotels et Golfs Open	−7 (71-65-71-70=277)	3 strokes	(Spain) Carlos Aguilar

== See also ==
- 2014 Challenge Tour graduates
