= Henrik Nyström =

Swedish professional golfer

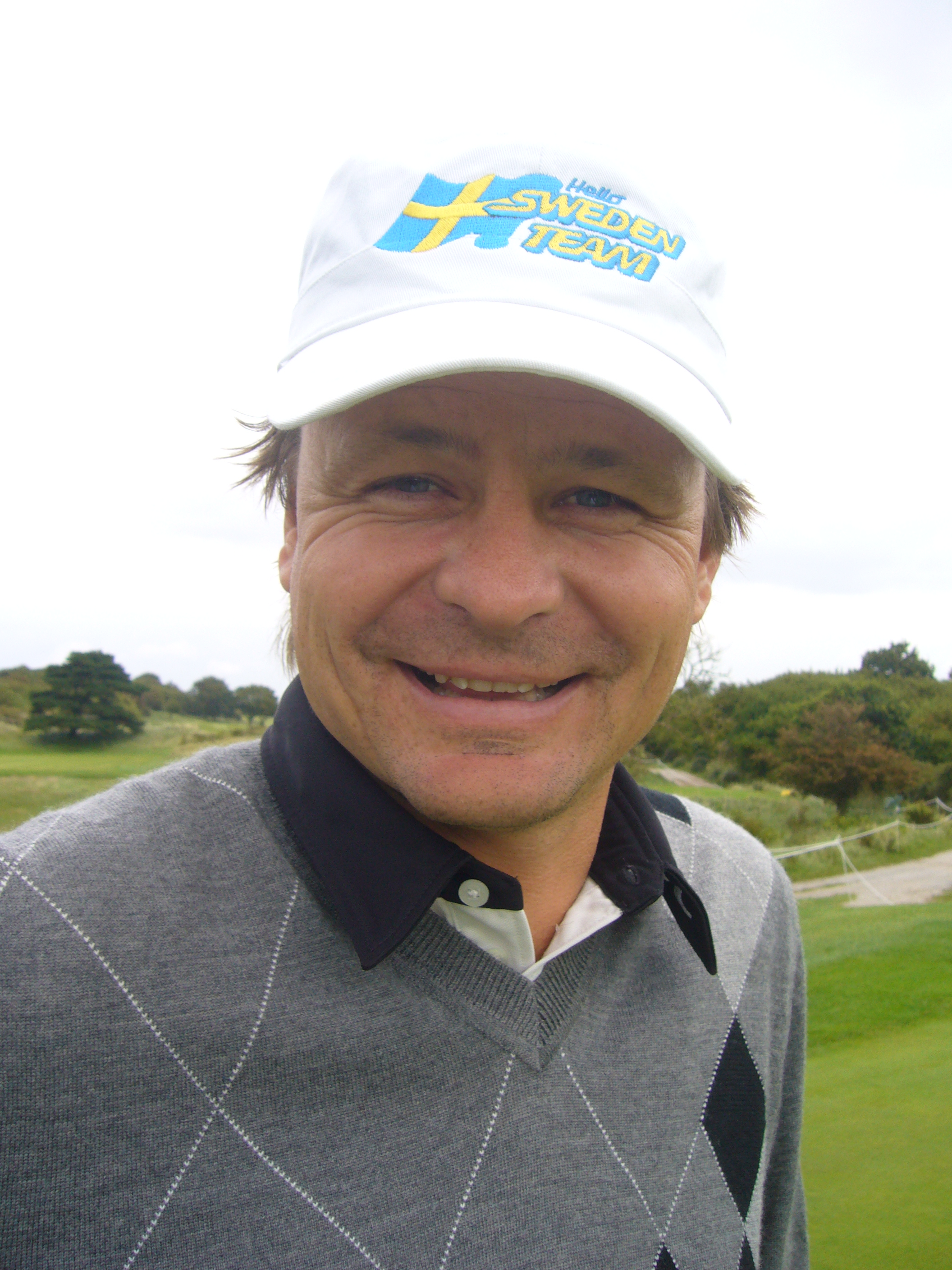
- Nyström at the 2008 KLM Dutch Open

Personal information
- Nationality: Sweden
- Born: 23 April 1969 (age 57) Västerås, Sweden
- Height: 1.79 m (5 ft 10 in)
- Weight: 77 kg (170 lb; 12.1 st)
- Spouse: Catharina (m. 1998)
- Children: Isabelle, Filippa

Career
- Sport: Golf
- College: Lynn University
- Turned professional: 1994
- Former tours: European Tour; Challenge Tour

Henrik Nyström (born 23 April 1969) is a Swedish professional golfer.

== Career ==
Nyström played college golf for Lynn University in the United States. He won the 1994 individual NAIA Men's Golf Championship.

Nyström turned professional in 1994. He spent his early career on the Challenge Tour, before reaching the top-level European Tour for the first time via qualifying school in 1997. He remained on the tour until 2003, despite having to return to qualifying school for his first two seasons. However after a poor 2003 season Nyström returned to the Challenge Tour, where a consistent season including eight top-ten finishes would propel him to ninth place in the season-end rankings and a European Tour return. He maintained his card via qualifying school in 2005 and 2006, automatically in 2007 and again via qualifying school - for a sixth time - in 2008. However, Nyström's 2009 season was curtailed by a fractured left knee, meaning he played on a medical exemption in 2010.

Nyström has three runner-up placings on the European Tour, at the 2000 Scottish PGA Championship, 2002 Omega Hong Kong Open, and 2006 Aa St Omer Open. His best season was 2002, when he finished 94th on the Order of Merit.

== Team appearances ==
Amateur

- European Amateur Team Championship (representing Sweden): 1993

== See also ==
- 2005 European Tour Qualifying School graduates
- 2006 European Tour Qualifying School graduates
- 2008 European Tour Qualifying School graduates
