= Martini Cup =

Tournament information
- Location: Torekov, Sweden
- Established: 1984
- Course: Torekov Golfklubb
- Par: 72
- Tour: Swedish Golf Tour
- Format: Stroke play
- Prize fund: kr 350,000
- Month played: May
- Final year: 1988

Tournament record score
- Aggregate: 281 Ove Sellberg (1985)
- To par: −7 as above

Final champion
- (Sweden) Carl-Magnus Strömberg

Location map
- Location in Sweden

The Martini Cup was a golf tournament on the Swedish Golf Tour from 1984 to 1988. It was played in Rya and Torekov, Sweden.

== Winners ==
Year	Winner	Score	To par	Margin of victory	Runner(s)-up	Venue	Purse	Ref.
Sapa Torekov Open
1988	(Sweden) Carl-Magnus Strömberg	209	−7	Playoff	(Sweden) Johan Ryström	Torekov	350,000	
Martini Cup
1987	(Sweden) Johan Ryström	142 (Note: Shortened to 36 holes due to fog.)	−2	1 stroke	(Sweden) Jesper Parnevik	Torekov	200,000	
1986	(Sweden) Per-Arne Brostedt	282	−6	3 strokes	(Sweden) Magnus Jönsson	Rya	200,000	
1985	(Sweden) Ove Sellberg	281	−7	4 strokes	(Sweden) Krister Kinell (Sweden) Magnus Persson	Rya	150,000	
Martini Cup Helsingborg Open
1984	(Sweden) Anders Johnsson	282	−6	Playoff	(Sweden) Anders Forsbrand (Sweden) Mats Lanner	Rya	125,000	
