= Ramlösa Open =

Tournament information
- Location: Helsingborg, Sweden
- Established: 1987
- Course: Rya Golf Club
- Par: 71
- Tours: Challenge Tour; Swedish Golf Tour
- Format: Stroke play
- Prize fund: £25,000
- Month played: May

Tournament record score
- Aggregate: 277 Olle Karlsson (1993); 277 Eric Carlberg (1994)
- To par: −11 Olle Karlsson (1993)

Final champion
- (Sweden) Eric Carlberg
- Location in Sweden

The Ramlösa Open was a golf tournament on the Challenge Tour and the Telia Tour. It ran from 1987 to 1994 and was always played in Helsingborg, Sweden.

== Winners ==
Year	Tour (Note: CHA − Challenge Tour; SWE − Swedish Golf Tour.)	Winner	Score	To par	Margin of victory	Runner(s)-up	Venue	Ref.
1994	CHA	(Sweden) Eric Carlberg (a)	277	−7	2 strokes	(Sweden) Mats Hallberg	Rya	
1993	CHA	(Sweden) Olle Karlsson	277	−11	3 strokes	(Sweden) Niclas Fasth	Vasatorp	
1992	CHA	(Sweden) Magnus Jönsson (a)	282	−2	1 stroke	(Sweden) Vilhelm Forsbrand (a)	Rya	
1991	CHA	(Sweden) Fredrik Larsson	282	−6	4 strokes	(Argentina) Rubén Alvarez	Vasatorp	
1990	CHA	(Sweden) Carl-Magnus Strömberg	284	−4	2 strokes	(Norway) Per Haugsrud	Rya	
1989	CHA	(West Germany) Heinz-Peter Thül	279	−9	Playoff	(Sweden) Fredrik Gemmel	Rya	
1988	SWE	(Sweden) Jesper Parnevik	279	−9	5 strokes	(Australia) Terry Price	Rya	
1987	SWE	(Sweden) Ulf Nilsson (a)	281	−7	1 stroke	(Sweden) Magnus Persson (Sweden) Ove Sellberg	Rya	
