= Swedish PGA Championship =

Annual men's golf tournament in Sweden

PGA of Sweden Championship
Tournament information
- Location: Rimforsa, Sweden
- Established: 1970
- Course: Onsjö Golfklubb
- Par: 72
- Length: 6,374 yards (5,828 m)
- Tours: Challenge Tour; Nordic Golf League; Swedish Golf Tour
- Format: Stroke play
- Prize fund: kr 530,000
- Month played: June

Tournament record score
- Aggregate: 270 Matthew King (2004)
- To par: −16 Christophe Pottier (2001)

Current champion
- (Sweden) Anton Karlsson

Location map
- Location in Sweden

The Swedish PGA Championship for men is a golf tournament played annually in Sweden since 1970. It has been an event on the Swedish Golf Tour schedule since 1984 and the Nordic Golf League since 1999.

== History ==
From its beginning in 1970, it was a championship for members of the PGA of Sweden. Since 1986, the tournament has been open to foreign players. The tournament was part of the Challenge Tour from 1990 to 1996 and 2001 to 2005.

Since 1984, when tournament professionals had been dominating the event for several years, there is also a Swedish PGA Club Pro Championship, limited to club professionals in Sweden, with separate competitions for men, women and senior men categories.

The Swedish PGA Championship for women has been played since 1997.

== Winners ==
Year	Tour (Note: CHA − Challenge Tour; NGL − Nordic Golf League; SWE − Swedish Golf Tour.)	Winner	Score	To par	Margin of victory	Runner(s)-up	Venue	Ref.
PGA of Sweden Championship
2026	NGL	(Sweden) Per Längfors	198	−18	1 stroke	(Denmark) Claes Thrane Borregaard	Onsjö	
PGA of Sweden Championship Landeryd
2025	NGL	(Sweden) Anton Karlsson	275	−11	Playoff	(Sweden) Charlie Lindh (Sweden) Adam Wallin	Landeryd (Vesterby Course)	
PGA Championship Landeryd Masters
2024	NGL	(Sweden) Jesper Sandborg	277	−7	3 strokes	(Sweden) Albin Bergström (Sweden) Linus Lilliedahl (Sweden) Felix Pålson (Denmark) Jens Kristian Thysted	Landeryd (Vesterby Course)	
2023	NGL	(Denmark) Peter Launer Bæk	271	−13	4 strokes	(Sweden) Oliver Gillberg	Landeryd (Vesterby Course)	
2022	NGL	(Sweden) Rasmus Holmberg	273	−11	1 stroke	(Denmark) Hamish Brown (a)	Landeryd (Vesterby Course)	
2021	NGL	(Sweden) Christopher Feldborg Nielsen	280	−4	Playoff	(Denmark) Jeppe Kristian Andersen	Landeryd (Vesterby Course)	
PGA Championship Bråviken Open
2020	SWE	(Sweden) Björn Hellgren	195	−21	Playoff	(Sweden) Mikael Lindberg	Bråviken	
PGA Championship
2019	NGL	(Denmark) Christian Bæch Christensen (Iceland) Guðmundur Kristjánsson	204	−9	Title shared (Note: Title shared when unsafe conditions ended play with Christensen and Kristjánsson still tied after four holes of a sudden-death playoff.)		Österlen	
2018	NGL	(Denmark) Morten Toft Hansen (a)	204	−12	2 strokes	(Denmark) Peter Launer Bæk (Sweden) Martin Eriksson	Österlen	
Star for Life PGA Championship
2017	NGL	(Sweden) Niklas Lemke (2)	204	−12	Playoff	(Iceland) Haraldur Magnús (Sweden) Christopher Feldborg Nielsen	PGA Sweden National	
Österlen PGA Open
2016	NGL	(Sweden) Ola Johansson	208	−8	1 stroke	(Sweden) Ludwig Nordeklint	Österlen	
2015	NGL	(Denmark) Patrick Winther	202	−14	1 stroke	(Norway) Kristian Krogh Johannessen	Österlen	
Landskrona Masters PGA Championship
2014	NGL	(Sweden) Fredrik Gustavsson	200	−13	3 strokes	(Sweden) Petter Bocian	Landskrona	
PEAB PGA Grand Opening
2013	NGL	(Sweden) Niklas Bruzelius	208	−8	3 strokes	(Denmark) Gebhard Victor Østerby	PGA Sweden National	
2012	NGL	(Sweden) Niklas Lemke	209	−7	1 stroke	(Sweden) Magnus A. Carlsson	PGA Sweden National	
2011	NGL	(Sweden) Steven Jeppesen	209	−7	2 strokes	(Sweden) Stefan Nilsson	PGA Sweden National	
PEAB PGA Open
2010	NGL	(Sweden) Magnus Persson Atlevi (2)	219	+3	4 strokes	(Sweden) Mark Larsson	PGA Sweden National	
PGA of Sweden National Open
2009	NGL	(Sweden) Alexander Björk	209	−7	1 stroke	(Sweden) Joakim Renström	PGA Sweden National	
PGA Landmann Open
2008	NGL	(Sweden) Jonas Enander-Hedin	206	−10	1 stroke	(Sweden) Jonas Pettersson	Haverdal	
2007	NGL	(Sweden) Rikard Karlberg (2)	204	−12	Playoff	(Sweden) Oskar Henningsson (Sweden) Olle Karlsson	Haverdal	
2006	NGL	(Sweden) Rikard Karlberg	206	−10	Playoff	(Sweden) Kalle Edberg	Haverdal	
Skandia PGA Open
2005	CHA	(Scotland) David Patrick	272	−8	Playoff	(England) Stuart Davis	Arlandastad	
2004	CHA	(England) Matthew King	270	−10	2 strokes	(Sweden) Magnus A. Carlsson	Arlandastad	
2003	CHA	(South Africa) Titch Moore	273	−11	2 strokes	(Argentina) Sebastián Fernández	Falsterbo	
2002	CHA	(France) Thomas Besancenez	279	−9	2 strokes	(Republic of Ireland) Gary Murphy	Halmstad	
2001	CHA	(France) Christophe Pottier	272	−16	1 stroke	(Sweden) Joakim Rask	Bokskogen	
2000	NGL	(Norway) Morten Orveland	208	−8	1 stroke	(Sweden) Per Larsson	Forsgården	
1999	NGL	(Sweden) Per Larsson	206	−13	3 strokes	(Sweden) Peter Hanson	Haninge	
Swedish PGA Championship
1998	SWE	(Sweden) Ulrik Gustafsson	277	−7	1 stroke	(Norway) Morten Orveland	Karlstad	
Helsingborg Golf Open
1997	SWE	(Sweden) Mikael Krantz	207	−9	2 strokes	(Sweden) Johan Annerfelt	Vasatorp	
Kentab/RBG Open
1996	CHA	(Sweden) Max Anglert	202	−14	1 stroke	(Sweden) Dennis Edlund	Frösåker	
Compaq Open
1995	CHA	(Sweden) Dennis Edlund	287	−1	3 strokes	(Denmark) Thomas Bjørn (Norway) Thomas Nielsen	Österåker	
1994	CHA	(Sweden) Adam Mednick (2)	287	−1	2 strokes	(Sweden) Dennis Edlund (Sweden) Mats Hallberg	Österåker	
1993	CHA	(Sweden) Niclas Fasth	275	−9	3 strokes	(Sweden) Vilhelm Forsbrand	Örebro	
Länsförsäkringar Open
1992	CHA	(England) Steven Bottomley	281	−3	Playoff	(Australia) Chris Gray (United States) Brian Nelson	Halmstad	
1991	CHA	(Sweden) Johan Ryström	283	−5	Playoff	(Sweden) Magnus Sunesson	Halmstad	
1990	CHA	(Sweden) Adam Mednick	281	−7	2 strokes	(Republic of Ireland) Eoghan O'Connell	Halmstad	
1989	CHA	(Sweden) Leif Hederström	281	−7	Playoff	(Sweden) Dennis Edlund	Halmstad	
1988	SWE	(Fiji) Vijay Singh	282	−6	1 stroke	(Sweden) Jesper Parnevik	Halmstad	
PGA Club Sweden Open
1987	SWE	(Sweden) Carl-Magnus Strömberg	276	−12	Playoff	(Italy) Emanuele Bolognesi	Lindö	
1986	SWE	(Sweden) Magnus Persson	285	−3	Playoff	(Sweden) Magnus Grankvist	Lindö	
1985	SWE	(Sweden) Per-Arne Brostedt (2)	288	E	3 strokes	(Sweden) Mats Hallberg (Sweden) Anders Johnsson	Lindö	
Swedish PGA Championship
1984	SWE	(Sweden) Per-Arne Brostedt	282	−6	1 stroke	(Sweden) Mats Hallberg (Sweden) Krister Kinell	Karlstad	
1983		(Sweden) Mats Lanner	292	E	3 strokes	(Sweden) Per-Arne Brostedt	Viksjö	
1982		(Sweden) Anders Forsbrand	293	+5	4 strokes	(Sweden) Per-Arne Brostedt (England) John Cockin	Halmstad	
1981		(Sweden) Gunnar Mueller (4)	293	+5	3 strokes	(England) Jason Barber	Södertälje	
1980		(Sweden) Peter Lindwall	291	−1	7 strokes	(England) John Cockin	Viksjö	
1979		(Sweden) Gunnar Mueller (3)	299	+11	4 strokes	(Sweden) Ingemar Christersson	Södertälje	
1978		(Sweden) Gunnar Mueller (2)	297	+9	Playoff	(Sweden) Hans Hedjerson	Värnamo	
1977		(Sweden) Hans Hedjerson	291	+3	4 strokes	(England) John Cockin	Ärila	
1976		(England) John Cockin	279	−1	2 strokes	(Sweden) Gunnar Mueller	Jönköping	
1975		(Sweden) Gunnar Mueller	282	+2	5 strokes	(Sweden) Thure Holmström (England) Keith Preston	Eskilstuna	
1974		(England) Keith Preston	295	+11	Playoff	(England) Peter Chamberlain (Egypt) Abdel Halim (Denmark) Herluf Hansen	Falkenberg	
1973		(Scotland) Eric Dawson	219	+6	2 strokes	(Denmark) Herluf Hansen	Båstad	
1972		(Sweden) Jan Rosell	289	+9	1 stroke	(Sweden) Bo Johansson	Jönköping	
1971		(England) Allan Turnbull	282	+2	8 strokes	(Egypt) Abdel Halim	Jönköping	
1970		(England) Peter Chamberlain	288	+8	1 stroke	(England) John Cockin	Jönköping	

== See also ==
- Swedish Golf Tour
- Nordic Golf League
- Swedish PGA Championship (women)
- List of sporting events in Sweden
