= Gevalia Open =

Golf tournament held in Gävle, Sweden

Tournament information
- Location: Gävle, Sweden
- Established: 1978
- Course: Gävle Golf Club
- Par: 72
- Tours: Challenge Tour; Nordic Golf League; Swedish Golf Tour; Swedish Mini Tour Future Series
- Format: Stroke play
- Final year: 2018

Tournament record score
- Aggregate: 269 Mats Lanner (1991)
- To par: −19 as above

Final champion
- (Sweden) Pontus Nyholm

Location map
- Location in Sweden

The Gevalia Open was a golf tournament held at Gävle Golf Club in Gävle, Sweden from 1978. It featured on the Swedish Golf Tour from its inception in 1984 and on the Challenge Tour in 1990 and 1991. It was renamed the Gefle Open in 1991, using the archaic spelling of Gävle.

In 2011 European Tour winner Peter Hedblom, the most successful player to represent Gävle Golf Club, hosted the tournament. The years 1999–2004 and 2006–2007 the club hosted the Gefle Ladies Open instead, on the women's Swedish Golf Tour.

== Winners ==
Year	Tour (Note: CHA − Challenge Tour; NGL − Nordic Golf League; SWE − Swedish Golf Tour.)	Winner	Score	To par	Margin of victory	Runner(s)-up	Ref.
Bilmetro Gefle Open
2018		(Sweden) Pontus Nyholm	134	−10	4 strokes	(Sweden) Oskar Bergman	
2017		(Sweden) William Nygård	143	−1	Playoff	(Sweden) Rasmus Holmberg (Sweden) Oliver Pousette	
2016		(Sweden) Philip Eriksson	134	−10	3 strokes	(Sweden) Nicklas Glans	
2012–2015: No tournament
Gefle Open
2011	NGL	(Sweden) Steven Jeppesen	208	−8	1 stroke	(Sweden) Kristoffer Broberg	
2010	NGL	(Sweden) Björn Åkesson	201	−15	4 strokes	(Sweden) Benny Ahlenbäck (Sweden) Peter Hedblom	
2009		(Sweden) Alexander Bergström	137	−7	2 strokes	(Sweden) Victor Almström	
2008		(Sweden) Cristian Härdin	140	−4	1 stroke	(Sweden) Erik Oja	
2006–07: No tournament
Gävle Energi Open
2005	NGL	(Finland) Panu Kylliäinen	212	−4	Playoff	(Sweden) Johan Bjerhag (Sweden) Pehr Magnebrant	
1997–2004: No tournament
Gefle Open
1996	SWE	(Sweden) Chris Hanell (a)	208	−8	3 strokes	(Sweden) Niclas Johnsson	
1995	SWE	(Sweden) Daniel Fornstam	210	−6	1 stroke	(Sweden) Niklas Diethelm (Sweden) Robert Löfqvist	
1992–1994: No tournament
1991	CHA	(Sweden) Mats Lanner (4)	269	−19	1 stroke	(Sweden) Magnus Rosenbäck	
Gevalia Open
1990	CHA	(Argentina) José Cantero	272	−16	1 stroke	(Sweden) Mats Lanner	
1989	CHA	(Sweden) Mats Lanner (3)	275	−13	Playoff	(Sweden) Joakim Haeggman	
1988	SWE	(Sweden) Dennis Edlund	277	−11	3 strokes	(Sweden) Peter Dahlberg (Sweden) Per-Arne Brostedt	
1987	SWE	(Sweden) Mats Lanner (2)	280	−8	3 strokes	(Sweden) Mikael Högberg	
1986	SWE	(Sweden) Mats Lanner	277	−11	6 strokes	(Denmark) Anders Sørensen	
1985	SWE	(Sweden) Magnus Grankvist	286	−2	2 strokes	(Sweden) Gunnar Mueller	
1984	SWE	(Sweden) Anders Forsbrand	278	−10	4 strokes	(Sweden) Clas Hultman	
1983		(Sweden) Magnus Persson	287	−1	1 stroke	(Sweden) Mats Lanner (Sweden) Jan Sonnevi	
1982		(Sweden) Per Andersson					
1981		(Sweden) Jan Andhagen	283	−5	16 strokes	(Sweden) Hans Wirtavuori	
1980		(Sweden) Anders Johnsson	289	+1	7 strokes	(Sweden) Mikael Högberg	
1979		(Sweden) Jan Grönkvist	295	+7	1 stroke	(Sweden) William Löfqvist	
1978		(Sweden) Freddy Carlsson	299	+11	1 stroke	(Sweden) Ove Sellberg	
