= Wermland Open =

Golf tournament in Karlstad, Sweden

Tournament information
- Location: Karlstad, Sweden
- Established: 1985
- Course: Karlstad Golf Club
- Par: 72
- Tours: Challenge Tour; Swedish Golf Tour
- Format: Stroke play
- Prize fund: £50,000
- Month played: July
- Final year: 1990

Tournament record score
- Aggregate: 278 Joakim Haeggman (1990)
- To par: −10 as above

Final champion
- (Sweden) Joakim Haeggman

Location map
- Location in Sweden

The Wermland Open was a golf tournament on the Challenge Tour and the Swedish Golf Tour. It ran from 1985 to 1990 and was always played in Karlstad, Värmland County, Sweden.

== Winners ==
Year	Tour (Note: CHA − Challenge Tour; SWE − Swedish Golf Tour.)	Winner	Score	To par	Margin of victory	Runner(s)-up	Ref.
Wermland Open
1990	CHA	(Sweden) Joakim Haeggman	278	−10	5 strokes	(Sweden) Lars Bonnevier (Sweden) Anders Forsbrand (Sweden) Mikael Högberg	
1989	CHA	(Sweden) Anders Gillner	281	−7	1 stroke	(Sweden) Anders Haglund (Norway) Per Haugsrud (Sweden) Peter Hedblom (Sweden) Jon Heimer (Sweden) Olle Nordberg	
Karlstad Open
1988	SWE	(Sweden) Leif Hederström	206	−10	1 stroke	(Fiji) Vijay Singh	
1987	SWE	(Sweden) Johan Ryström	139	−5	1 stroke	(Sweden) Per-Ive Persson	
1986	SWE	(Sweden) Per-Arne Brostedt	203	−13	3 strokes	(United States) Jeff Hart	
1985	SWE	(Sweden) Peter Bäckbom	285	−3	Playoff	(Sweden) Krister Kinell	
