= Swedish International Stroke Play Championship =

Swedish International
Tournament information
- Location: Sölvesborg, Sweden
- Established: 1945
- Course: Sölvesborg Golf Club
- Par: 71
- Tours: Challenge Tour; Swedish Golf Tour
- Format: Stroke play
- Prize fund: kr 500,000 (2007)

Tournament record score
- Aggregate: 269 Joakim Haeggman (1992)
- To par: −15 as above

Current champion
- (Denmark) Daniel Toft

Location map
- Location in Sweden

The Swedish International Stroke Play Championship or Swedish International (SI) is a golf tournament played in Sweden since 1945. It has been featured on the Swedish Golf Tour and the Challenge Tour.

Formally named the Swedish Golf Federation 72-hole Stroke Play Championship at inception, it was known locally as the Svenskt Internationellt Slagtävlingsmästerskap (SISM) until it officially assumed the name Swedish International in 1984. Professionals and amateurs competed separately from 1945 to 1958, before being amateur only from 1959 to 1983. It became open to any golfer from 1984 with the introduction of the Swedish Golf Tour. Officially a Swedish National Championship between 1982 and 2007, a separate National Champion was named in the event of a foreign winner.

The tournament was discontinued after the 2007 season, but resurrected again in 2026 as the Swedish International Men's Amateur Championship, part of the EGA's European Amateur Order of Merit, a series of 16 premier events across Europe.

== Winners ==
=== Amateur tournament ===
Year	Winner	Score	To par	Margin of victory	Runner-up	Venue	Ref.
2026	(Denmark) Daniel Toft	203	−10	3 strokes	(England) Lewy Hayward	Sölvesborg	

=== Professional tournament ===
Year	Tour (Note: CHA − Challenge Tour; NGL − Nordic Golf League; SWE − Swedish Golf Tour.)	Winner	Score	To par	Margin of victory	Runner(s)-up	Venue	Ref.
Swedish International
2005	NGL	(Norway) Morten Hagen	211	−8	3 strokes	(Sweden) Andreas Ljunggren	Vidbynäs	
2004	NGL	(Sweden) Hampus von Post	196	−20	9 strokes	(Finland) Ville Karhu	Uppsala	
2003	NGL	(Finland) Ari Savolainen	212	−4	1 stroke	(Sweden) Magnus A. Carlsson	Uppsala	
1993–2001: No tournament
SI Compaq Open
1992	CHA	(Sweden) Joakim Haeggman	269	−15	4 strokes	(Sweden) Per-Ive Persson	Örebro	
1991	CHA	(England) Jonathan Sewell	274	−10	1 stroke	(Wales) Neil Roderick	Örebro	
1990	CHA	(Sweden) Jesper Parnevik	275	−9	3 strokes	(Sweden) John Lindberg	Örebro	
SI Aragon Open
1989	CHA	(Sweden) Anders Gillner	277	−7	2 strokes	(Sweden) Mikael Högberg	Örebro	
SI Trygg-Hansa Open
1988	SWE	(Norway) Per Haugsrud	210	−6	1 stroke	(Sweden) Peter Hedblom (a) (Sweden) Carl-Magnus Strömberg (Sweden) Björn Svedin	Forsbacka	
1987	SWE	(France) Marc Pendariès (a)	286	−2	1 stroke	(Argentina) Luis Carbonetti	Ullna	
1986	SWE	(Sweden) Mats Lanner	209	−7	3 strokes	(Sweden) Thomas Engström	Kalmar	
SI Wang Open
1985	SWE	(Sweden) Mats Lanner	276	−12	7 strokes	(Sweden) Nils Lindeblad	Vasatorp	
Swedish International
1984	SWE	(Sweden) Anders Forsbrand	279	−9	5 strokes	(New Zealand) Peter Hamblett	Skellefteå	

=== Amateur tournament ===
Year	Venue	Winner	Score
1983	Lyckorna	(Sweden) Mikael Högberg	279
1982	Uppsala	(Scotland) David Carrick	293
1981	Karlshamn	(Scotland) David Carrick	285
1980	Ärila	(Sweden) Jan Rube	288
1979	Falsterbo	(Scotland) Gordon Brand Jnr	210
1978	Halmstad	(Sweden) Björn Svedin	296
1977	Båstad	(Sweden) Mikael Sorling	285
1976	Örebro	(Sweden) Jan Rube	283
1975	Jönköping	(Sweden) Hans Hedjerson	278
1974	Delsjö	(Switzerland) Yves Hofstetter	293
1973	Rya	(Sweden) Staffan Mannerström	294
1972	Örebro	(Sweden) Magnus Lindberg	296
1971	Drottningholm	(Sweden) Gösta Ignell	290
1970	Åtvidaberg	(Sweden) Hans Hedjerson	287
1969	Delsjö	(Sweden) Claes Jöhncke	285
1968	Falsterbo	(Sweden) Claes Jöhncke	225
1967	Örebro	(Sweden) Claes Jöhncke	287
1966	Drottningholm	(Sweden) Claes Jöhncke	288
1965	Linköping	(Sweden) Claes Jöhncke	288
1964	Halmstad	(Sweden) Claes Jöhncke	300
1963	Jönköping	(Sweden) Claes Jöhncke	299
1962	Hovås	(Sweden) Rune Karlfelt	288
1961	Rya	(Sweden) Gustaf Adolf Bielke	277
1960	Båstad	(Sweden) Gunnar Carlander	297
1959	Falsterbo	(Sweden) P O Johansson	289

=== Amateur and professional tournament ===
Year	Venue	Winner	
Year	Venue	Amateur	Professional
1958	Lund	(Sweden) Gustaf Adolf Bielke	(Denmark) Carl Poulsen
1957	Halmstad	(Sweden) Rune Karlfeldt	(Sweden) Harry Fakt
1956	Djursholm	(Sweden) Gunnar Carlander	(Sweden) Åke Bergkvist
1955	Hovås	(Sweden) Elis Werkell	(Sweden) Arne Werkell
1954	Delsjö	(Sweden) Ola Bergqvist	(Sweden) Arne Werkell
1953	Lidingö	(Sweden) Lennart Leiborn	(Sweden) Arne Werkell
1952	Falsterbo	(Sweden) Elis Werkell	(Sweden) Arne Werkell
1951	Halmstad	(Sweden) Elis Werkell	(Sweden) Arne Werkell
1950	Båstad	(Sweden) Hans Stenberg	(Denmark) Carl Poulsen
1949	Djursholm	(Sweden) Elis Werkell	(Sweden) Arne Werkell
1948	Falsterbo	(Sweden) Thore Andersson	(Sweden) Arne Werkell
1947	Kevinge	(Sweden) Erik Runfelt	(Sweden) Arne Werkell
1946	Hovås	(Sweden) Finn Sörvik	(Sweden) Arne Werkell
1945	Falsterbo	(Sweden) Elis Werkell	(England) Douglas Brasier

== See also ==
- Swedish Matchplay Championship
- Swedish International Women's Stroke Play Championship
