= Magnus Grankvist =

Swedish professional golfer

Personal information
- Nationality: Sweden
- Born: 3 April 1964 (age 62)

Career
- Sport: Golf
- Turned professional: 1985
- Former tour: Swedish Golf Tour
- Professional wins: 7

Number of wins by tour
- Challenge Tour: 1
- Other: 6

Magnus Grankvist (born 3 April 1964) is a Swedish professional golfer and golf coach. He won the 1986 Europcar Cup, a "special event" on the European Tour, and the 1989 SM Match on the Challenge Tour.

== Career ==
Grankvist was part of the National Team as an amateur. He won the bronze at the 1984 European Youths' Team Championship at Hermitage GC, Ireland with a team that included Jesper Parnevik, Fredrik Lindgren and Johan Ryström. After turning professional, he played on the Swedish Golf Tour, where he won four tournaments, including the SM Match in 1986 and 1989. In 1989, the tournament was part of the Satellite Tour, which soon was renamed the Challenge Tour. In 1986, he finished third on the Swedish Golf Tour Order of Merit, behind Per-Arne Brostedt and Magnus Persson Atlevi.

In 1986, he was part of the winning Swedish team at the Europcar Cup together with Anders Forsbrand, Per-Arne Brostedt and Magnus Sunesson.

== Coaching career ==
Grankvist started working for the Swedish Golf Federation after retiring from tour. 1998–2002 he was head coach for the National Boys Team, which he led to victory at the 2001 European Boys' Team Championship at Amber Baltic GC in Poland and silver the following year at Reykjavik GC in Iceland. Both teams included Jonas Blixt, Steven Jeppesen and Niklas Lemke.

In 2003 he coached the Swedish team to a bronze finish behind Spain and England at the European Amateur Team Championship held at Royal Hague GCC, Netherlands. The team consisted of Kalle Edberg, Steven Jeppesen, Niklas Lemke, Per Nilsson, Alex Norén and Wilhelm Schauman.

He also coached the European team in the 2005 Palmer Cup, a match the Americans won 14 to 10.

== Professional wins (7) ==
=== Challenge Tour wins (1) ===
No.	Date	Tournament	Winning score	Margin of victory	Runner-up
1	30 Jul 1989	SM Match Play	2 and 1		(Sweden) Yngve Nilsson

Challenge Tour playoff record (0–1)

No.	Year	Tournament	Opponents	Result
1	1989	Teleannons Grand Prix	(Sweden) Mikael Karlsson, (Sweden) Mats Lanner, (Sweden) Ove Sellberg	Lanner won with eagle on third extra hole

=== Swedish Golf Tour wins (3) ===
No.	Date	Tournament	Winning score	Margin of victory	Runner-up
1	18 Aug 1985	Gevalia Open	−2 (73-71-71-71=286)	2 strokes	(Sweden) Gunnar Mueller
2	27 Jul 1986	SM Match Trygg-Hansa Cup	3 and 2		(Sweden) John Lindberg
3	14 Sep 1986	Kentab Open	−1 (69-69-68=206)	Playoff	(Sweden) Mats Hallberg

=== Other wins (3) ===
- 2011 (2) Forsgården Open, Göteborg District Championship
- 2012 (1) Sportlife Open

== Team appearances ==
Amateur

- European Youths' Team Championship (representing Sweden): 1984

Professional

- Europcar Cup (representing Sweden): 1986 (winners)
