= NCC Open =

Tournament information
- Location: Billesholm, Sweden
- Established: 1984
- Course: Söderåsen Golfklubb
- Par: 71
- Length: 6,616 yards (6,050 m)
- Tours: Challenge Tour; Swedish Golf Tour
- Format: Stroke play
- Prize fund: kr 840,000
- Final year: 2001

Tournament record score
- Aggregate: 273 Benn Barham (2001)
- To par: −14 Thomas Nilsson (1989)

Final champion
- (England) Benn Barham
- Location in Sweden

The NCC Open was a golf tournament on the Swedish Golf Tour from 1984 and on the Challenge Tour from 1990. It was last played in 2001 and always held at Söderåsen Golf Club near Söderåsen National Park outside Helsingborg, Sweden.

== Winners ==
Year	Tour (Note: CHA − Challenge Tour; SWE − Swedish Golf Tour.)	Winner	Score	To par	Margin of victory	Runner(s)-up	Ref.
NCC Open
2001	CHA	(England) Benn Barham	273	−11	2 strokes	(England) Paul Dwyer	
2000	CHA	(Republic of Ireland) David Higgins	274	−10	3 strokes	(Sweden) Martin Erlandsson	
1999	CHA	(Sweden) Per G. Nyman	281	−3	Playoff	(Sweden) Klas Eriksson (Denmark) Thomas Nørret	
1998	CHA	(Sweden) Johan Ryström	276	−8	1 stroke	(Sweden) Fredrik Larsson	
SIAB Open
1997	CHA	(Sweden) Joakim Rask	281	−3	1 stroke	(Sweden) Kalle Brink	
1996	CHA	(Finland) Kalle Väinölä	281	−3	Playoff	(Sweden) Adam Mednick	
1995	CHA	(Finland) Anssi Kankkonen	283	−1	2 strokes	(Finland) Kalle Väinölä	
1994	CHA	(Norway) Per Haugsrud	283	−1	4 strokes	(Denmark) Lars Løgstrup	
1993	CHA	(Sweden) Per-Ive Persson	278	−6	Playoff	(Sweden) Fredrik Larsson	
1992	CHA	(Sweden) Mikael Krantz	280	−8	4 strokes	(Sweden) Olle Karlsson (Sweden) Klas Eriksson	
1991	CHA	(England) Jon Evans	285	−7	1 stroke	(Sweden) Olle Karlsson	
FLA Open
1990	CHA	(Sweden) Olle Nordberg	284	−8	Playoff	(Sweden) Mikael Högberg	
Nescafé Cup
1989	CHA	(Sweden) Thomas Nilsson	278	−14	2 strokes	(Sweden) Mats Hallberg (Sweden) Mikael Krantz	
1988	SWE	(Sweden) Jan Tilmanis	283	−9	3 strokes	(Australia) Terry Price	
1987	SWE	(Denmark) Anders Sørensen	285	−7	1 stroke	(Australia) Terry Price	
1986	SWE	(Sweden) Per-Arne Brostedt	292	E	3 strokes	(United States) Ronald Stelten	
Maggi Cup
1985	SWE	(Sweden) Nils Lindeblad	288	−4	1 stroke	(Argentina) Luis Carbonetti	
1984	SWE	(Sweden) Magnus Sunesson	289	+1	5 strokes	(Sweden) Mats Lanner	
