= Carl-Magnus Strömberg =

Swedish professional golfer (born 1962)

Personal information
- Nationality: Sweden
- Born: 12 July 1962 (age 64)

Career
- Sport: Golf
- Turned professional: 1987
- Former tours: European Tour; Challenge Tour; Swedish Golf Tour
- Professional wins: 6

Number of wins by tour
- Challenge Tour: 2
- Other: 4

Carl Magnus Strömberg (born 12 July 1962) is a retired Swedish professional golfer. In 1987 he won both the Swedish Matchplay Championship and the Swedish PGA Championship before joining the Challenge Tour and later the European Tour.

== Amateur career ==
Strömberg was part of the Swedish team, together with Magnus Hennberg, John Lindberg, Johan Tumba, Johan Ryström and Jesper Parnevik, earning silver at the 1985 European Amateur Team Championship at Halmstad GK in Sweden.

He represented Sweden twice at the Eisenhower Trophy. The Swedish team, with Strömberg Mikael Högberg, Jesper Parnevik and John Lindberg, finished 8th in 1984 and, with Strömberg, Johan Ryström, Cristian Härdin and Parnevik, fourth in 1986.

== Professional career ==
Strömberg turned professional in 1987 and joined the Swedish Golf Tour (SGT), where he was runner-up on the Order of Merit in 1987 and 1988. He won five SGT tournaments 1987–1989 and in 1990 joined the nascent Challenge Tour, where he won the Ramlösa Open on home soil in the first season. On the 1991 Challenge Tour, he was fourth at the Zimbabwe Open and in total racked up 14 top-10 finishes 1991–1997. His best season on the European Tour was 1994, where he made 7 cuts in 16 starts, with a best finish of tied 17th at the Italian Open at Marco Simone Golf and Country Club.

== Professional wins (6) ==
=== Challenge Tour wins (2) ===
No.	Date	Tournament	Winning score	Margin of victory	Runner-up
1	27 Aug 1989	Esab Open	−3 (68-74-71=213)	3 strokes	(Sweden) Mikael Hed
2	20 May 1990	Ramlösa Open	−4 (73-71-70-70=284)	2 strokes	(Norway) Per Haugsrud

=== Swedish Golf Tour wins (4) ===
No.	Date	Tournament	Winning score	Margin of victory	Runner(s)-up
1	24 May 1987	Naturgas Open	−1 (75-68-72=215)	3 strokes	(Sweden) Ulf Nilsson, (Sweden) Johan Ryström
2	26 Jul 1987	SM Match Trygg-Hansa Cup	1 up		(Sweden) Johan Ryström
3	23 Aug 1987	PGA Club Sweden Open	−12 (71-72-67-66=276)	Playoff	(Italy) Emanuele Bolognesi
4	8 May 1988	Sapa Torekov Open	−7 (68-71-70=209)	Playoff	(Sweden) Johan Ryström

== Team appearances ==
Amateur

- Eisenhower Trophy (representing Sweden): 1984, 1986
- European Amateur Team Championship (representing Sweden): 1985
