= Telia Challenge Waxholm =

Tournament information
- Location: Vaxholm, Sweden
- Established: 1984
- Course: Waxholm Golf Club
- Par: 73
- Length: 7,318 yards (6,692 m)
- Tour: Challenge Tour
- Format: Stroke play
- Prize fund: kr 1,175,000
- Month played: September
- Final year: 2007

Tournament record score
- Aggregate: 270 Jamie Donaldson (2001); 270 Magnus Persson Atlevi (2001); 270 Rafael Echenique (2006)
- To par: −22 as above

Final champion
- (England) Iain Pyman
- Location in Sweden

The Telia Challenge Waxholm was a golf tournament on the Challenge Tour 1990–1991 and 1996–2007 and the Swedish Golf Tour from 1985. It was always played in Sweden.

== Winners ==
Year	Tour (Note: CHA − Challenge Tour; SWE − Swedish Golf Tour.)	Winner	Score	To par	Margin of victory	Runner(s)-up	Venue	Ref.
Telia Challenge Waxholm
2007	CHA	(England) Iain Pyman	274	−18	2 strokes	(England) Robert Coles	Waxholm	
2006	CHA	(Argentina) Rafael Echenique	270	−22	2 strokes	(Germany) Martin Kaymer	Waxholm	
2005	CHA	(Norway) Morten Hagen	280	−12	Playoff	(Sweden) Christian Nilsson	Waxholm	
Telia Grand Prix
2004	CHA	(England) Lee Slattery	281	−3	1 stroke	(Sweden) Hampus von Post	Ljunghusens	
2003	CHA	(Scotland) Euan Little	276	−8	2 strokes	(England) Robert Coles	Ljunghusens	
2002	CHA	(England) Matthew Blackey	276	−12	2 strokes	(France) Jean-François Lucquin	Ljunghusens	
2001	CHA	(Wales) Jamie Donaldson	270	−22	Playoff	(Sweden) Magnus Persson Atlevi	Bro-Bålsta	
Gula Sidorna Grand Prix
2000	CHA	(Sweden) Henrik Stenson	277	−7	3 strokes	(Netherlands) Robert-Jan Derksen (England) Kenneth Ferrie	Ljunghusens	
1999	CHA	(Sweden) Raimo Sjöberg	208	−5	2 strokes	(Sweden) Klas Eriksson	Ljunghusens	
Telia Grand Prix
1998	CHA	(Sweden) Mats Lanner (3)	284	E	Playoff	(Denmark) Morten Backhausen (Sweden) Per Nyman	Ljunghusens	
Telia InfoMedia Grand Prix
1997	CHA	(Sweden) Fredrik Henge	205	−11	1 stroke	(Denmark) Steen Tinning	Ljunghusens	
1996	CHA	(England) Scott Watson	281	−7	Playoff	(England) Michael Archer (Sweden) Fredrik Larsson (Sweden) Emil Madsen	Ljunghusens	
1992–1995: No tournament
Teleannons Grand Prix
1991	CHA	(Sweden) Jan Tilmanis	213	−3	Playoff	(Sweden) Magnus Jönsson	Ågesta	
1990	CHA	(Sweden) Mikael Högberg	205	−11	1 stroke	(Argentina) José Cantero	Ågesta	
1989	CHA	(Sweden) Mats Lanner (2)	211	−8	Playoff	(Sweden) Magnus Grankvist (Sweden) Mikael Karlsson (Sweden) Ove Sellberg	Ågesta	
1988	SWE	(Sweden) Magnus Sunesson (2)	SKr 95,000		SKr 56,000	(Sweden) Anders Forsbrand	Ågesta	
1987	SWE	(Sweden) Johan Ryström	71	−1	3 strokes	(Sweden) Daniel Westermark	Ågesta	
Stiab Grand Prix
1986	SWE	(Sweden) Magnus Sunesson	19 holes			(Republic of Ireland) Eamonn Darcy	Ågesta	
1985	SWE	(United States) Rick Hartmann	5 and 4			(Sweden) Mats Lanner	Ågesta	
1984	SWE	(Sweden) Mats Lanner	20 holes			(Sweden) Magnus Persson	Ågesta	
