= Per-Arne Brostedt =

Swedish professional golfer

Personal information
- Full name: Per Arne Brostedt
- Nationality: Sweden
- Born: 9 January 1958 (age 68) Stockholm, Sweden
- Height: 5 ft 8 in (1.73 m)

Career
- Sport: Golf
- Turned professional: 1978
- Former tours: European Tour; Swedish Golf Tour; European Senior Tour
- Professional wins: 10

Best results in major championships
- Masters Tournament: DNP
- PGA Championship: DNP
- U.S. Open: DNP
- The Open Championship: CUT: 1984, 1987

Achievements and awards
- Swedish Golf Tour Order of Merit winner: 1985, 1986

Per-Arne Brostedt (born 9 January 1958) is a Swedish professional golfer, member of the winning Swedish team at the 1986 Europcar Cup, a special event on the European Tour. He was 1984 and 1985 Swedish PGA Champion and won the Swedish Golf Tour Order of Merit in 1985 and 1986.

== Amateur career ==
17 years old, Brostedt won the 1975 District Championship in the Swedish capital of Stockholm. Three years later, as an invited amateur, Brostedt finished tied 4th at the professional tournament Flygt Open at his home course Viksjö Golf Club north of Stockholm, in June 1978.

== Professional career ==
Brostedt turned professional later in 1978 and played on the growing professional golf circuit in Sweden. He played on the Asia Golf Circuit the 1982–83 season and finished 21st on the money rankings. His best finish was 5th at the 1983 Indian Open. In January 1983, he became the first Swede to play in a tournament on the PGA Tour, after qualifying for the 1983 Phoenix Open.

In 1984, Brostedt played in his first major championship, The 113th Open Championship at the Old Course in St Andrews, Scotland, where he missed the 36-hole cut. From the 1984 season, the Swedish Golf Tour was established and Brostedt won five tournaments the first three seasons, including the Swedish PGA Championship in 1984 and 1985. In 1985 and 1986 he won the Swedish Golf Tour Order of Merit.

In 1986 he was part of the winning Swedish team at the Europcar Cup in Biarritz, France, together with Anders Forsbrand, Magnus Grankvist and Magnus Sunesson.

His best season on the European Tour was in 1987 when he played in The Open Championship at Muirfield. He also finished tied 18th at the PLM Open and tied 21st at the Scandinavian Enterprise Open, both on home soil. He finished 149th on the 1987 European Tour Order of Merit.

In 1993 Brostedt won the annual Swedish Married Couple Championship, a 36-hole foursome held in Sunne, with his wife at the time, Charlotte Montgomery, who herself was a professional golfer and played on the LPGA Tour 1982–1987. Together they ran a Golf Academy in Stockholm in the early 1990s.

Brostedt turned 50 in January 2008 and attempted to qualify for the European Senior Tour, but played only in the PGA Seniors Championship at Slaley Hall where he finished tied 77th. He finished ninth in the Q-School and joined the European Senior Tour in 2009, where he made 7 cuts in 8 starts.

== Professional wins (10) ==
=== Swedish Golf Tour wins (5) ===
| No. | Date | Tournament | Winning score | Margin of victory | Runner(s)-up |
|---|---|---|---|---|---|
| 1 | 4 Aug 1984 | Swedish PGA Championship | −6 (73-70-71-68=282) | 1 stroke | (Sweden) Mats Hallberg, (Sweden) Krister Kinell |
| 2 | 25 Aug 1985 | PGA Club Sweden Open (2) | E (74-69-75-70=288) | 3 strokes | (Sweden) Mats Hallberg, (Sweden) Anders Johnsson |
| 3 | 1 Jun 1986 | Martini Cup | −6 (72-70-70-70=282) | 3 strokes | (Sweden) Magnus Jönsson |
| 4 | 8 Jun 1986 | Nescafé Cup | E (77-72-70-73=292) | 3 strokes | (United States) Ronald Stelten |
| 5 | 31 Aug 1986 | Karlstad Open | −13 (66-64-73=203) | 3 strokes | (United States) Jeff Hart |

=== Swedish pro circuit wins (3) ===
| No. | Date | Tournament | Winning score | Margin of victory | Runner(s)-up |
|---|---|---|---|---|---|
| 1 | 31 Aug 1982 | Marbella Invest Classic (Albatross GC) | | 2 strokes | (Sweden) Mats Lanner |
| 2 | 15 May 1983 | Scania Open (Södertälje GC), | −2 (69-74=142) | 1 stroke | (Sweden) Anders Forsbrand, (Sweden) Ove Sellberg, (Sweden) Magnus Persson |
| 3 | 11 Sep 1983 | Kvällsposten Masters (Bokskogen GC) | +2 (71-71-73-75=290) | 2 strokes | (Sweden) Anders Forsbrand |

=== Senior wins (2) ===
- 2011 Swedish PGA Senior Club Pro Championship
- 2014 Swedish PGA Senior Club Pro Championship

== Results in major championships ==
| Tournament | 1984 | 1985 | 1986 | 1987 |
|---|---|---|---|---|
| The Open Championship | CUT | | | CUT |

Note: Brostedt only played in The Open Championship.

Did not play

CUT = missed the half-way cut

== Team appearances ==
Professional

- Europcar Cup (representing Sweden): 1986 (winners)
