= Joakim Haeggman =

Swedish professional golfer

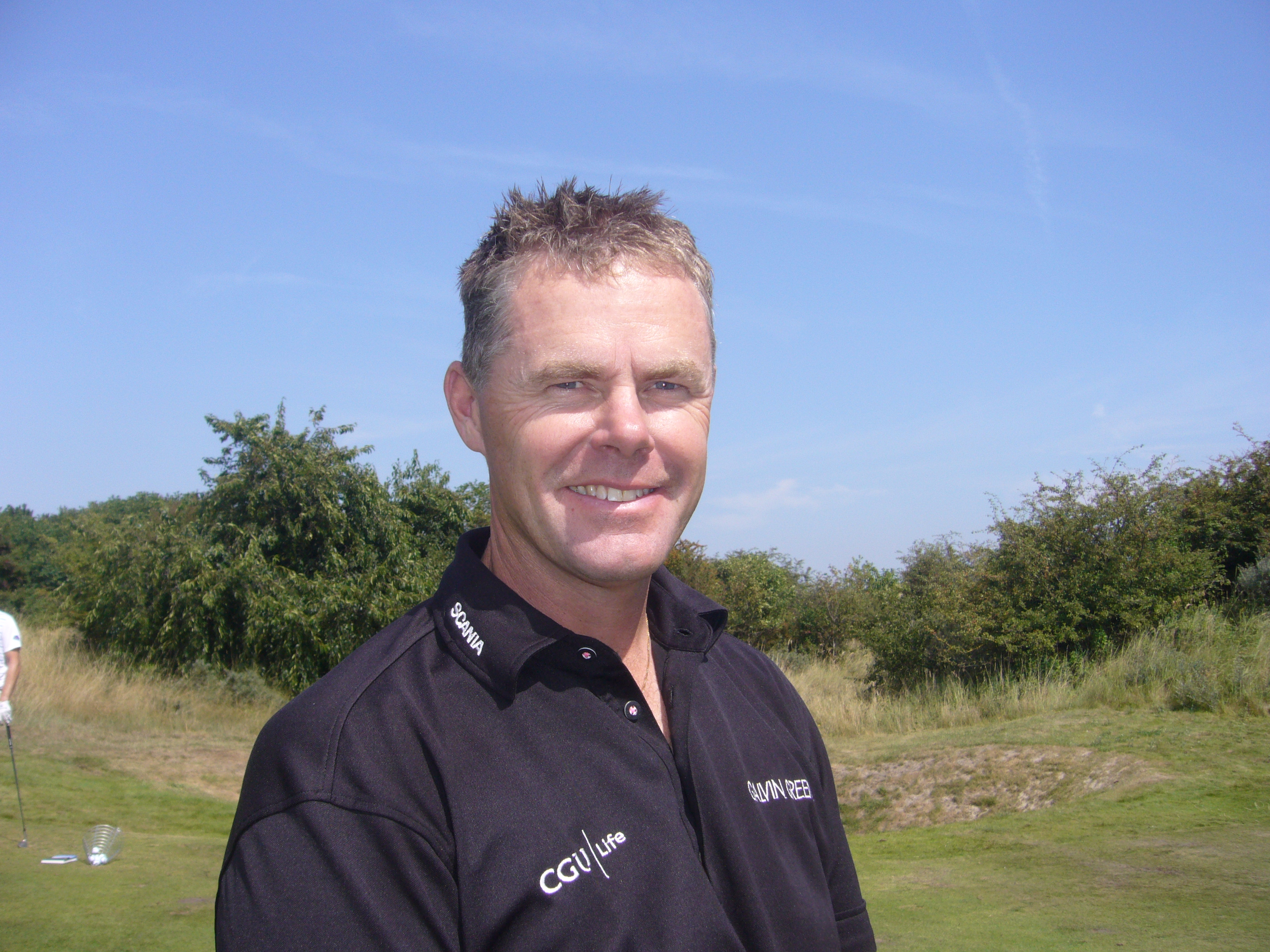
- Haeggman at the 2009 KLM Open

Personal information
- Full name: Karl Sven Joakim Haeggman
- Nickname: Jocke
- Nationality: Sweden
- Born: 28 August 1969 (age 57) Kalmar, Sweden
- Height: 1.85 m (6 ft 1 in)
- Weight: 88 kg (194 lb; 13.9 st)
- Spouse: Emelie (m. 2011)
- Children: 2

Career
- Sport: Golf
- Turned professional: 1989
- Current tour: European Senior Tour
- Former tours: European Tour; Challenge Tour
- Professional wins: 11
- Highest ranking: 39 (25 July 2004)

Number of wins by tour
- European Tour: 3
- Challenge Tour: 3
- European Senior Tour: 2
- Other: 3

Best results in major championships
- Masters Tournament: CUT: 2005
- PGA Championship: CUT: 1994, 2004
- U.S. Open: T57: 2004
- The Open Championship: T16: 2004

Achievements and awards
- Swedish Golf Tour Order of Merit winner: 1992

Karl Sven Joakim Haeggman (born 28 August 1969) is a Swedish professional golfer. Haeggman formerly played on the European Tour. He was the first Swede to play in the Ryder Cup.

== Early life ==
In 1969, Haeggman was born in Kalmar on the east coast of the province of Småland in Sweden. He grew up close to the golf course at Kalmar Golf Club and learned the game without golf playing parents.

He won the unofficial 1985 Swedish Youth Championship, Colgate Cup, at his age level (16 years old)

== Amateur career ==
In 1986, Haeggman won the Swedish Junior Under 19 Championship.

As a 19 year old, Haeggman won the 1988 French Open Amateur Stroke-play Championship at Chantilly, north of Paris, shooting a score of level par 288. The year after, he won the French Junior Open Match-play Championship as well.

He turned professional during 1989, still a junior, why he never represented Sweden on the highest amateur level, only at boys' level and the Continent of Europe at the Jacques Léglise Trophy.

== Professional career ==
In 1989, Haeggman won his place on the European Tour at that year's qualifying school. He has won three events on the European Tour, and several other professional events. His best seasons were 1993, 1997 and 2004, in each of which he made the top twenty on the Order of Merit.

Haeggman won his first tournament on the highest level at the 1993 Peugeot Spanish Open, becoming the first Swedish winner of the event and claiming the tenth Swedish victory on the European Tour.

The same year, Haeggman became the first Swede to play for the European Team in the Ryder Cup. He won his Sunday singles match against John Cook with one hole up, but Europe lost the Ryder Cup match against United States 15-13 at The Belfry Golf Club, England.

Haeggman was out of the game for nearly two years following an ice hockey accident in 1994 which left him with a dislocated shoulder and broken ribs, which deprived him of the chance to play in the following Ryder Cup, and he has not represented Europe again. He also missed half a season after breaking his ankle playing ice hockey in December 2002.

Haeggman represented Sweden four times at the World Cup and twice at the Dunhill Cup.

At the 1993 Dunhill Cup at the Old Course, St Andrews, Scotland, the Swedish team of Haeggman, Anders Forsbrand and Jesper Parnevik finished tied 3rd, after losing just one match, against winners to be United States in the semi-finals.

At the 1997 Dunhill Cup, Haeggman scored a record 27 strokes on the front nine holes at the Old Course, in his stroke-play match against Justin Leonard, United States. The Swedish team of Haeggman, Per-Ulrik Johansson and Jesper Parnevik eventually lost in the final of the tournament against South Africa.

In 1994, Haeggman and Jesper Parnevik represented Sweden at the World Cup of Golf at the Hyatt Dorado Beach Resort in Puerto Rico. Sweden finished 3rd, behind United States and Zimbabwe and Haeggman finished in 9th place among individuals.

In July 2004, Haeggman reached his career-best 39th place in the Official World Golf Ranking system.

== Awards and honors ==
- In 1992, Haeggman earned Order of Merit honors on the Swedish Golf Tour.
- In 1998, Haeggman was awarded honorary member of the PGA of Sweden.

== Amateur wins ==
- 1988 Coupe Murat (French Open Amateur Stroke-play Championship)
- 1989 French Junior Open Match-play Championship

== Professional wins (11) ==
=== European Tour wins (3) ===
No.	Date	Tournament	Winning score	Margin of victory	Runner(s)-up
1	16 May 1993	Peugeot Spanish Open	−13 (69-69-69-68=275)	2 strokes	(South Africa) Ernie Els, (England) Nick Faldo
2	3 Aug 1997	Volvo Scandinavian Masters	−18 (67-69-65-69=270)	4 strokes	(Spain) Ignacio Garrido
3	14 Mar 2004	Qatar Masters	−16 (75-64-68-65=272)	1 stroke	(Japan) Nobuhito Sato

European Tour playoff record (0–1)

No.	Year	Tournament	Opponent	Result
1	1994	Alfred Dunhill Open	(England) Nick Faldo	Lost to par on first extra hole

=== Asia Golf Circuit wins (1) ===
No.	Date	Tournament	Winning score	Margin of victory	Runners-up
1	20 Mar 1994	Benson & Hedges Malaysian Open	−9 (71-67-72-69=279)	Playoff	(Malaysia) Periasamy Gunasegaran, (New Zealand) Frank Nobilo

Asia Golf Circuit playoff record (1–0)

No.	Year	Tournament	Opponents	Result
1	1994	Benson & Hedges Malaysian Open	(Malaysia) Periasamy Gunasegaran, (New Zealand) Frank Nobilo	Won with par on eighth extra hole Nobilo eliminated by par on sixth hole

=== Challenge Tour wins (3) ===
No.	Date	Tournament	Winning score	Margin of victory	Runner-up
1	8 Jul 1990	Wermland Open	−10 (68-71-66-73=278)	5 strokes	(Sweden) Mikael Högberg
2	9 Aug 1992	SI Compaq Open	−15 (69-69-64-67=269)	4 strokes	(Sweden) Per-Ive Persson
3	27 Apr 2008	AGF-Allianz Open Côtes d'Armor Bretagne	−9 (66-74-67-68=275)	1 stroke	(England) Marcus Higley

Challenge Tour playoff record (0–1)

No.	Year	Tournament	Opponent	Result
1	1989	Gevalia Open	(Sweden) Mats Lanner	Lost to birdie on second extra hole

=== Argentine Tour wins (1) ===
- 1998 Center Open

=== Other wins (1) ===
- 2001 Hassan II Golf Trophy

=== European Senior Tour wins (2) ===
Legend
Tour Championships (1)
Other European Senior Tour (1)

No.	Date	Tournament	Winning score	Margin of victory	Runner-up
1	4 Dec 2022	MCB Tour Championship (Seychelles)	−11 (66-67-66=199)	4 strokes	(Brazil) Adilson da Silva
2	1 Sep 2024	HSBC India Legends Championship^{1}	−9 (65-70-72=207)	2 strokes	(England) Andrew Marshall

^{1}Co-sanctioned by the Professional Golf Tour of India

== Results in major championships ==
Tournament	1993	1994	1995	1996	1997	1998	1999	2000	2001	2002	2003	2004	2005
Masters Tournament													CUT
U.S. Open		CUT										T57	
The Open Championship	CUT	T77		CUT		T38						T16	CUT
PGA Championship		CUT										CUT	

Did not play

CUT = missed the half-way cut
"T" = tied

== Results in World Golf Championships ==
Tournament	2004	2005
Match Play		R64
Championship	T48	
Invitational	WD	

Did not play

QF, R16, R32, R64 = Round in which player lost in match play
"T" = Tied
WD = withdrew

== Results in senior major championships ==
Tournament	2021	2022	2023	2024	2025	2026
Senior PGA Championship	T14	T50	CUT	T14	CUT	
The Tradition						
U.S. Senior Open	CUT	CUT	50	T22	T53	CUT
Senior Players Championship						
The Senior Open Championship	T40	T41	T25	T17	T51	CUT

Did not play

CUT = missed the halfway cut
"T" indicates a tie for a place

== Team appearances ==
Amateur

- European Boys' Team Championship (representing Sweden): 1986, 1987
- Jacques Léglise Trophy (representing the Continent of Europe): 1986 (winners), 1987

Professional

- Dunhill Cup (representing Sweden): 1993, 1997
- Ryder Cup (representing Europe): 1993
- World Cup (representing Sweden): 1993, 1994, 1997, 2004

== See also ==
- 2008 European Tour Qualifying School graduates
- 2010 European Tour Qualifying School graduates
