= Per-Ive Persson =

Swedish professional golfer (born 1965)

Personal information
- Nationality: Sweden
- Born: 3 April 1965 (age 61) Höganäs, Sweden

Career
- Sport: Golf
- Turned professional: 1985
- Former tours: Challenge Tour; Swedish Golf Tour
- Professional wins: 1

Number of wins by tour
- Challenge Tour: 1

Per-Ive Persson (born 3 April 1965) is a Swedish former professional golfer. He won the Siab Open on the 1993 Challenge Tour.

== Career ==
Persson represented Mölle Golf Club. He turned professional in 1985 and joined the Swedish Golf Tour. In 1997, he was runner-up at the 1987 Wermland Open, a stroke behind Johan Ryström.

On the 1992 Swedish Golf Tour, Persson was runner-up at the SI Compaq Open behind Joakim Haeggman, and finished runner-up in the Order of Merit, behind Haeggman.

Persson joined the nascent Challenge Tour and won the 1993 Siab Open at Söderåsen Golf Club, following a playoff with Fredrik Larsson where he won with par on the second extra hole.

The 1996 Swedish Matchplay Championship was his last championship as a professional.

== Professional wins (1) ==
=== Challenge Tour wins (1) ===
No.	Date	Tournament	Winning score	Margin of victory	Runner-up
1	6 Jun 1993	Siab Open	−6 (71-67-70-70=278)	Playoff	(Sweden) Fredrik Larsson

Challenge Tour playoff record (1–0)

No.	Year	Tournament	Opponent	Result
1	1993	Siab Open	(Sweden) Fredrik Larsson	Won with par on the second hole
