= 1986 Swedish Golf Tour =

Golf tour season

1986 Swedish Golf Tour season
- Duration: 23 May 1986 – 28 September 1986
- Number of official events: 12
- Most wins: (Sweden) Per-Arne Brostedt (3)
- Order of Merit: (Sweden) Per-Arne Brostedt

The 1986 Swedish Golf Tour was the third season of the Swedish Golf Tour, the main professional golf tour in Sweden since it was formed in 1984.

== Schedule ==
The following table lists official events during the 1986 season.

Date	Tournament	Location	Purse (SKr)	Winner (Note: The number in brackets after each winner's name is the number of Swedish Golf Tour events they had won up to and including that tournament.)
25 May	Naturgas Open	Skåne	175,000	(Australia) Mike Harwood (n/a)
1 Jun	Martini Cup	Skåne	200,000	(Sweden) Per-Arne Brostedt (3)
8 Jun	Nescafé Cup	Skåne	200,000	(Sweden) Per-Arne Brostedt (4)
15 Jun	Stiab Grand Prix	Skåne	572,000	(Sweden) Magnus Sunesson (2)
6 Jul	SI Trygg-Hansa Open	Småland	200,000	(Sweden) Mats Lanner (5)
27 Jul	SM Match Trygg-Hansa Cup	Småland	200,000	(Sweden) Magnus Grankvist (2)
17 Aug	Gevalia Open	Gästrikland	200,000	(Sweden) Mats Lanner (6)
24 Aug	PGA Club Sweden Open	Östergötland	225,000	(Sweden) Magnus Persson (1)
31 Aug	Karlstad Open	Värmland	175,000	(Sweden) Per-Arne Brostedt (5)
14 Sep	Kentab Open	Västmanland	175,000	(Sweden) Magnus Grankvist (3)
21 Sep	Esab Open	Närke	175,000	(Sweden) Mikael Högberg (1)
28 Sep	Owell Open	Småland	250,000	(Sweden) Magnus Persson (2)

== Order of Merit ==
The Order of Merit was based on prize money won during the season, calculated in Swedish krona.

Position	Player	Prize money (SKr)
1	(Sweden) Per-Arne Brostedt	210,050
2	(Sweden) Magnus Persson	162,071
3	(Sweden) Magnus Sunesson	160,010
4	(Sweden) Magnus Grankvist	132,660
5	(Denmark) Anders Sørensen	125,860

== See also ==
- 1986 Swedish Golf Tour (women)
