= Costa Blanca Challenge =

Golf tournament in Spain

Tournament information
- Location: Costa Blanca, Spain
- Established: 2000
- Course: Club de Golf Bonalba
- Par: 72
- Length: 6,963 yards (6,367 m)
- Tour: Challenge Tour
- Format: Stroke play
- Prize fund: €80,000
- Month played: May

Tournament record score
- Aggregate: 276 Johan Ryström; 276 Henrik Stenson
- To par: −12 as above

Final champion
- (Sweden) Johan Ryström
- Location in Spain Location in the Valencian Community

The Costa Blanca Challenge was a golf tournament on the Challenge Tour that was played in Spain.

The event was only played in 2000. Johan Ryström carded a course record 65 on the second round. England's James Hepworth carded a final-round 67 to end up 11-under 277, a stroke behind the all-Swedish playoff in which Ryström defeated Henrik Stenson at the first extra hole.

== Winners ==
Year	Winner	Score	To par	Margin of victory	Runner-up	Ref.
2000	(Sweden) Johan Ryström	278	−12	Playoff	(Sweden) Henrik Stenson	
