= Vasatorp Golf Club =

Golf complex in Helsingborg, Sweden

- Location in Sweden
- 56.057718°N 12.7864453°E

Club information
- Location: Helsingborg, Skåne County, Sweden
- Established: 1973 (SGF Member)
- Type: Public
- Tournaments: Scandinavian Enterprise Open; Helsingborg Open; Compaq Open
- Website: vasatorp.golf

Tournament Course
- Designed by: Arthur Hills/Steve Forrest & Associates
- Par: 72

Classic Course
- Designed by: Ture Bruce/Steve Forrest
- Par: 72

Allébanan
- Designed by: Stefan Nilsson, Hans Fock
- Par: 36

Västra 9:an
- Designed by: Ove Sellberg
- Par: 36

Vasatorp Golf Club (Vasatorps Golfklubb; Vasatorps GK) is a 57-hole golfing complex located 9 km east of Helsingborg in Skåne County, southern Sweden. Its two championship courses have hosted tournaments both on the European Tour and Ladies European Tour, where former world number one players Annika Sörenstam, Seve Ballesteros, and Greg Norman all have recorded victories.

== History ==
The club has two 18-hole courses, the 72-par Tournament Course finished in 2008 and designed by Arthur Hills, and the 72-par Classic Course finished in 1974 and redesigned in 2013, as well as one 12-hole course and one 9-hole course. With almost 3,800 members it is one of the largest in Sweden.

Svensk Golf, official publication of the Swedish Golf Federation, in 2024 ranked the Tournament Course #12 and the Classic Course #28 in Sweden using the Golf Digest methodology. The club was voted the best golf club in Sweden in 2015, 2016 and 2017 by golfers in the World Golf Awards.

The club was awarded Swedish Golf Club of the Year by the Swedish Golf Federation in 1978 and the club has won the Swedish Team Championships in 1991, 2001, 2002, 2004, 2006, 2011 and 2017, and the Swedish Women's Team Championships in 2014.

Successful players that have represented the club include European Tour players Kalle Brink, Steven Jeppesen and Mikael Krantz, European Tour winners Joakim Bäckström and Mikael Lundberg, as well as PGA Tour winner Gabriel Hjertstedt.

The club has hosted the Compaq Open and Helsingborg Open on the Ladies European Tour as well as the Scandinavian Enterprise Open on the PGA European Tour in 1978, 1979 and 1980, where winners were Seve Ballesteros, Sandy Lyle and Greg Norman.

The club was selected to host the 2021 European Amateur Team Championship but the tournament was moved to PGA Catalunya due to pandemic considerations. The club was instead awarded the 2024 European Amateur Championship.

== Tournaments hosted ==
=== Professional ===
| Year | Tour (Note: CHA − Challenge Tour; EUR − European Tour; LET − Ladies European Tour.) | Championship | Winner |
|---|---|---|---|
| 1978 | EUR | Scandinavian Enterprise Open | (Spain) Seve Ballesteros |
| 1979 | EUR | Scandinavian Enterprise Open | (Scotland) Sandy Lyle |
| 1980 | EUR | Scandinavian Enterprise Open | (Australia) Greg Norman |
| 1991 | CHA | Ramlösa Open | (Sweden) Fredrik Larsson |
| 1993 | CHA | Ramlösa Open | (Sweden) Olle Karlsson |
| 2002 | LET | Compaq Open | (Sweden) Annika Sörenstam |
| 2013 | LET | Helsingborg Open | (Australia) Rebecca Artis |
| 2014 | LET | Helsingborg Open | (Netherlands) Dewi Claire Schreefel |
| 2015 | LET | Helsingborg Open | (Denmark) Nicole Broch Larsen |
| 2024 | EUR · LET | Scandinavian Mixed | (Sweden) Linn Grant |

=== Amateur ===
- Swedish Junior Strokeplay Championship – 2001 · 2010 · 2013
- Swedish Junior Matchplay Championship – 2009 · 2014
- Annika Invitational Europe – 2019 · 2022
- European Amateur Championship – 2025
