= Per Haugsrud =

Norwegian golfer

Personal information
- Nationality: Norway
- Born: 20 February 1965 (age 61) Sarpsborg, Norway
- Height: 6 ft 0 in (1.83 m)

Career
- Sport: Golf
- Turned professional: 1987
- Former tours: European Tour; Challenge Tour
- Professional wins: 3

Number of wins by tour
- Challenge Tour: 2
- Other: 1

Best results in major championships
- Masters Tournament: DNP
- PGA Championship: DNP
- U.S. Open: DNP
- The Open Championship: CUT: 1997

Per Haugsrud (born 20 February 1965) is a Norwegian professional golfer and the first Norwegian to play on the European Tour.

== Amateur career ==
Haugsrud began to play golf at the nine hole course in Sarpsborg when he was only seven years old. He was a scratch player at age 15. He won two Norwegian Amateur titles and represented Norway in the 1984 Eisenhower Trophy, the World Amateur Golf Team Championships.

== Professional career ==
Haugsrud tried for European Tour card six times and succeeded on three occasions, starting with the 1991 European Tour season, playing a total of 157 European Tour tournaments 1987–2001 collecting €416,939 in winnings. He was runner-up at the 1990 Ramlösa Open and also played 27 Challenge Tour tournaments 1991–1995 where he won the 1993 SM Matchplay and 1994 SIAB Open. In addition, he played over a dozen tournaments on the Asia Golf Circuit 1993–1995, with a best finish of fifth in the 1993 Thailand Open.

Regaining his European Tour card, he retained it between 1996 and 1998, before suffering a finger injury in 1999 and was granted a medical exemption in 2000. He recorded 4 top-10 finishes including a tie for fourth at the 1997 Volvo German Open and a tie for third along with Jesper Parnevik and Mark Davis at the 1994 Scandinavian Masters, four strokes behind Vijay Singh. The other two top-10 finishes were achieved in the Smurfit European Open 1996 and 1997, where he tied at 10th place.

Haugsrud represented Norway at the 1989, 1991 and 1992 World Cup, along with the 1998 World Cup of Golf and 2001 WGC-World Cup. He peaked at around 300 on the Official World Golf Rankings in 1997. He was the second Norwegian ever to qualify for The Open Championship after Tore Sviland.

Starting in 2015 Haugsrud teamed up with Henrik Bjørnstad to provide commentary for the PGA Tour broadcast on Eurosport Norway.

== Amateur wins ==
- 1983 Norwegian Amateur Championship
- 1986 Norwegian Amateur Championship

== Professional wins (3) ==
=== Challenge Tour wins (2) ===
No.	Date	Tournament	Winning score	Margin of victory	Runner-up
1	29 Aug 1993	SM Match Play	2 and 1		(Sweden) Joakim Nilsson
2	23 Jun 1994	SIAB Open	−1 (72-70-72-69=283)	4 strokes	(Denmark) Lars Løgstrup

=== Swedish Golf Tour wins (1) ===
No.	Date	Tournament	Winning score	Margin of victory	Runners-up
1	3 Jul 1988	SI Trygg-Hansa Open	−6 (67-69-74=210)	1 stroke	(Sweden) Peter Hedblom (a), (Sweden) Carl-Magnus Strömberg, (Sweden) Björn Svedin

== Results in major championships ==
Tournament	1997
The Open Championship	CUT

CUT = missed the halfway cut
Note: Haugsrud only played in The Open Championship.

== Team appearances ==
Amateur

- European Amateur Team Championship (representing Norway): 1985
- Eisenhower Trophy (representing Norway): 1984

Professional

- World Cup (representing Norway): 1989, 1991, 1992, 1998, 2001
