= 1987 Swedish Golf Tour =

Golf tour season

1987 Swedish Golf Tour season
- Duration: 24 April 1987 – 27 September 1987
- Number of official events: 14
- Most wins: (Sweden) Johan Ryström (3) (Sweden) Carl-Magnus Strömberg (3)
- Order of Merit: (Sweden) Johan Ryström

The 1987 Swedish Golf Tour was the fourth season of the Swedish Golf Tour, the main professional golf tour in Sweden since it was formed in 1984.

== Schedule ==
The following table lists official events during the 1987 season.

| Date | Tournament | Location | Purse (SKr) | Winner (Note: The number in brackets after each winner's name is the number of Swedish Golf Tour events they had won up to and including that tournament.) |
|---|---|---|---|---|
| 26 Apr | Martini Cup | Skåne | 200,000 | (Sweden) Johan Ryström (1) |
| 24 May | Naturgas Open | Skåne | 200,000 | (Sweden) Carl-Magnus Strömberg (1) |
| 31 May | Ramlösa Open | Västergötland | 250,000 | (Sweden) Ulf Nilsson (1) |
| 7 Jun | Nescafé Cup | Skåne | 250,000 | (Denmark) Anders Sørensen (1) |
| 21 Jun | Lacoste Open | Denmark | 225,000 | (Australia) Peter Jones (n/a) |
| 28 Jun | Teleannons Grand Prix | Skåne | 258,000 | (Sweden) Johan Ryström (2) |
| 5 Jul | SI Trygg-Hansa Open | Uppland | 250,000 | (France) Marc Pendariès (a) (n/a) |
| 26 Jul | SM Match Trygg-Hansa Cup | Östergötland | 274,000 | (Sweden) Carl-Magnus Strömberg (2) |
| 16 Aug | Gevalia Open | Gästrikland | 250,000 | (Sweden) Mats Lanner (7) |
| 23 Aug | PGA Club Sweden Open | Östergötland | 250,000 | (Sweden) Carl-Magnus Strömberg (3) |
| 30 Aug | Karlstad Open | Värmland | 200,000 | (Sweden) Johan Ryström (3) |
| 13 Sep | Kentab Open | Västmanland | 200,000 | (United States) Gus Ulrich (n/a) |
| 20 Sep | Esab Open | Halland | 200,000 | (Sweden) Mikael Karlsson (1) |
| 27 Sep | Volvo Albatross | Småland | 250,000 | (Denmark) Anders Sørensen (2) |

== Order of Merit ==
The Order of Merit was based on prize money won during the season, calculated in Swedish krona.

| Position | Player | Prize money (SKr) |
|---|---|---|
| 1 | (Sweden) Johan Ryström | 233,300 |
| 2 | (Sweden) Carl-Magnus Strömberg | 173,550 |
| 3 | (Sweden) Mikael Högberg | 128,400 |
| 4 | (Denmark) Anders Sørensen | 128,000 |
| 5 | (Sweden) Ulf Nilsson | 122,950 |

== See also ==
- 1987 Swedish Golf Tour (women)
