= Torneo Islantilla Golf =

Tournament information
- Location: Huelva, Spain
- Established: 1993
- Course: Islantilla Golf Club
- Par: 72
- Tour: Challenge Tour
- Format: Stroke play
- Prize fund: £30,000
- Month played: April
- Final year: 1993

Tournament record score
- Aggregate: 283 Magnus Persson
- To par: −5 as above

Final champion
- (Sweden) Magnus Persson
- Location in Spain Location in Andalusia

The Torneo Islantilla Golf was a golf tournament on the Challenge Tour. It was played 1993 in Islantilla, Spain.

== Winners ==
Year	Winner	Score	To par	Margin of victory	Runner-up	Ref.
1993	(Sweden) Magnus Persson	283	−5	1 stroke	(Spain) Antonio Garrido	
