= 1985 Swedish Golf Tour =

Golf tour season

1985 Swedish Golf Tour season
- Duration: 31 May 1985 – 14 September 1985
- Number of official events: 9
- Most wins: (Sweden) Mats Lanner (2)
- Order of Merit: (Sweden) Per-Arne Brostedt

The 1985 Swedish Golf Tour was the second season of the Swedish Golf Tour, the main professional golf tour in Sweden since it was formed in 1984.

== Schedule ==
The following table lists official events during the 1985 season.

Date	Tournament	Location	Purse (SKr)	Winner (Note: The number in brackets after each winner's name is the number of Swedish Golf Tour events they had won up to and including that tournament.)
2 Jun	Martini Cup	Skåne	150,000	(Sweden) Ove Sellberg (1)
9 Jun	Maggi Cup	Skåne	150,000	(Sweden) Nils Lindeblad (1)
16 Jun	Owell Open	Småland	200,000	(Sweden) Mats Lanner (3)
7 Jul	PLM Open	Skåne	350,000	(England) Denis Durnian (n/a)
28 Jul	Karlstad Open	Värmland	150,000	(Sweden) Peter Bäckbom (1)
11 Aug	SI Wang Open	Skåne	200,000	(Sweden) Mats Lanner (4)
18 Aug	Gevalia Open	Gästrikland	175,000	(Sweden) Magnus Grankvist (1)
25 Aug	PGA Club Sweden Open	Östergötland	200,000	(Sweden) Per-Arne Brostedt (2)
14 Sep	Stiab Grand Prix	Skåne	306,000	(United States) Rick Hartmann (n/a)

== Order of Merit ==
The Order of Merit was titled as the Epson Order of Merit was based on prize money won during the season, calculated in Swedish krona.

Position	Player	Prize money (SKr)
1	(Sweden) Per-Arne Brostedt	147,775
2	(Sweden) Mats Lanner	143,860
3	(Sweden) Nils Lindeblad	96,825
4	(Sweden) Ove Sellberg	85,100
5	(Sweden) Peter Carsbo	82,955
