= Johan Ryström =

Swedish professional golfer

Personal information
- Full name: Johan Börje Ryström
- Nationality: Sweden
- Born: 13 January 1964 (age 62) Köping, Sweden
- Height: 1.90 m (6 ft 3 in)
- Weight: 85 kg (187 lb; 13.4 st)

Career
- Sport: Golf
- Turned professional: 1986
- Former tours: European Tour; Challenge Tour; Swedish Golf Tour
- Professional wins: 8

Number of wins by tour
- Challenge Tour: 3
- Other: 5

Best results in major championships
- Masters Tournament: DNP
- PGA Championship: DNP
- U.S. Open: DNP
- The Open Championship: T62: 1999

Achievements and awards
- Swedish Golf Tour Order of Merit winner: 1987

Johan Börje Ryström (born 13 January 1964) is a Swedish professional golfer.

Ryström grew up in Köping. He started playing golf at age six and was a scratch golfer by age fifteen.

in August 1986, Ryström won the Nordic Championship over 72 holes in Hvide Klit, Denmark. Later that year he represented Sweden at the Eisenhower Trophy in Caracas, Venezuela, finishing 4th with his team and 9th individually.

He turned professional after the 1986 season and won three times on the Challenge Tour. He had six top-10 finishes on the Challenge Tour in 2000 including victory in the Costa Blanca Challenge after beating Henrik Stenson in a playoff.

Ryström twice graduated from the Challenge Tour but never won a European Tour title, finishing runner-up three times. He tied for second in the 1992 Monte Carlo Open together with Mark McNulty, two strokes behind Ian Woosnam. Later the same year he tied for second at the Open de Catalonia, one stroke behind José Rivero. In the 1993 Honda Open he lost in a playoff to Sam Torrance.

Ryström earned a medical exemption for the 2003 season after suffering an elbow injury in 2002, but that were to be his last season. His European Tour official prize money 1988–2003 totaled €886,715.

== Amateur wins ==
- 1986 Nordic Championship

== Professional wins (8) ==
=== Challenge Tour wins (3) ===
No.	Date	Tournament	Winning score	Margin of victory	Runner-up
1	11 Aug 1991	Länsförsäkringar Open	−5 (70-70-68-75=283)	Playoff	(Sweden) Magnus Sunesson
2	14 Jun 1998	NCC Open	−8 (66-69-69-72=276)	1 stroke	(Sweden) Fredrik Larsson
3	14 May 2000	Costa Blanca Challenge	−12 (68-65-73-70=276)	Playoff	(Sweden) Henrik Stenson

Challenge Tour playoff record (2–0)

No.	Year	Tournament	Opponent	Result
1	1991	Länsförsäkringar Open	(Sweden) Magnus Sunesson	Won with par on first extra hole
2	2000	Costa Blanca Challenge	(Sweden) Henrik Stenson	Won with birdie on first extra hole

=== Swedish Golf Tour wins (5) ===
No.	Date	Tournament	Winning score	Margin of victory	Runner-up
1	26 Apr 1987	Martini Cup	−2 (70-72=142) (Note: Shortened to 36 holes due to weather.)	1 stroke	(Sweden) Jesper Parnevik
2	28 Jun 1987	Teleannons Grand Prix	−1 (71)	3 strokes	(Sweden) Daniel Westermark
3	30 Aug 1987	Karlstad Open	−5 (70-69=139)	1 stroke	(Sweden) Per-Ive Persson
4	11 Sep 1988	Västerås Kentab Open	−4 (70-65-68=203)	1 stroke	(Sweden) Mikael Krantz
5	10 May 1997	Motoman Robotics Open	−3 (72-71-70=213)	3 strokes	(Sweden) Johan Lundquist

== Playoff record ==
European Tour playoff record (0–1)

No.	Year	Tournament	Opponents	Result
1	1993	Honda Open	(England) Paul Broadhurst, (Scotland) Sam Torrance, (Wales) Ian Woosnam	Torrance won with birdie on first extra hole

== Results in major championships ==
Tournament	1987	1988	1989	1990	1991	1992	1993	1994	1995	1996	1997	1998	1999
The Open Championship	CUT	CUT	CUT			CUT							T62

Note: Ryström only played in The Open Championship.

Did not play

CUT = missed the half-way cut
"T" = tied

== Team appearances ==
Amateur

- European Amateur Team Championship (representing Sweden): 1985
- Eisenhower Trophy (representing Sweden): 1986
- St Andrews Trophy (representing the Continent of Europe): 1986

Professional

- Europcar Cup (representing Sweden): 1987, 1988 (winners)
- World Cup (representing Sweden): 1988
