= Olle Karlsson =

Swedish golfer

Personal information
- Nationality: Sweden
- Born: 9 April 1969 (age 57) Falkenberg, Sweden
- Height: 1.76 m (5 ft 9 in)
- Weight: 78 kg (172 lb; 12.3 st)

Career
- Sport: Golf
- Turned professional: 1989
- Former tours: European Tour; Asia Golf Circuit; Challenge Tour; Swedish Golf Tour
- Professional wins: 2

Number of wins by tour
- Challenge Tour: 1
- Other: 1

Best results in major championships
- Masters Tournament: DNP
- PGA Championship: DNP
- U.S. Open: DNP
- The Open Championship: T62: 1993

Olle Karlsson (born 9 April 1969) is a Swedish professional golfer and European Tour player. In 1998, he won the Open Novotel Perrier (with Jarmo Sandelin) and was runner-up at the English Open.

== Amateur career ==
Karlsson lost the final of the 1987 Spanish International Amateur Championship to Michael Quirke of Ireland.

In 1988 he appeared in the PLM Open, a European Tour event held at Flommen Golf Club, where he made the cut and tied for 19th.

== Professional career ==
Karlsson turned professional in 1989 and joined the Swedish Golf Tour and the Challenge Tour, where he won the 1993 Ramlösa Open. Playing on the Asia Golf Circuit, he tied for 3rd at the Philippine Open in 1992.

Between 1993 and 2002 Karlsson played over 200 events on the European Tour, finishing top-10 fifteen times, despite being plagued for years by injuries sustained in a serious car accident in February 1994.

Karlsson won the 1998 Open Novotel Perrier with Jarmo Sandelin, an unofficial money event on the European Tour. He was runner-up at the 1998 English Open behind Lee Westwood, and finished third at the 1995 Jersey Open and the 1996 Johnnie Walker Classic in Singapore.

He made the cut at The Open Championship twice, in 1993 at Royal St George's Golf Club and in 1995 at the Old Course at St Andrews.

In 2001, after he finished 5th in the British Masters at Woburn and 4th in the Benson & Hedges International Open at The Belfry, Karlsson peaked at 164 on the Official World Golf Ranking.

Karlsson retired from tour after the 2002 season. Making three appearances on the 2007 Swedish Golf Tour, he lost a playoff at the Swedish PGA Championship to Rikard Karlberg.

== Professional wins (2) ==
=== Challenge Tour wins (1) ===
No.	Date	Tournament	Winning score	Margin of victory	Runner-up
1	30 May 1993	Ramlösa Open	−11 (69-70-71-67=277)	3 strokes	(Sweden) Niclas Fasth

=== Other wins (1) ===
No.	Date	Tournament	Winning score	Margin of victory	Runners-up
1	18 Oct 1998	Open Novotel Perrier (with (Sweden) Jarmo Sandelin)	−26 (62-68-63-136=329)	3 strokes	(England) Richard Boxall and (England) Derrick Cooper

== Results in major championships ==
Tournament	1993	1994	1995	1996	1997	1998	1999	2000	2001
The Open Championship	T62		T68						CUT

Did not play

CUT = missed the halfway cut
"T" = Tied
Note: Karlsson only played in The Open Championship.
