= Mats Lanner =

Swedish professional golfer

Personal information
- Full name: Mats Åke Lanner
- Nationality: Sweden
- Born: 5 March 1961 (age 65) Gothenburg, Sweden
- Height: 1.80 m (5 ft 11 in)
- Weight: 80 kg (176 lb; 12 st 8 lb)
- Spouse: Lena
- Children: 2

Career
- Sport: Golf
- Turned professional: 1981
- Former tours: European Tour; Challenge Tour; Swedish Golf Tour
- Professional wins: 16
- Highest ranking: 86 (7 May 1989)

Number of wins by tour
- European Tour: 3
- Challenge Tour: 4
- Other: 9

Best results in major championships
- Masters Tournament: DNP
- PGA Championship: DNP
- U.S. Open: DNP
- The Open Championship: T28: 1992

Achievements and awards
- Swedish Golf Tour Order of Merit winner: 1984

Mats Åke Lanner (born 5 March 1961) is a Swedish professional golfer, who formerly played on the European Tour. In 1987, he became the second Swedish player to win a European Tour tournament.

== Early life and amateur career ==
Lanner was born in Gothenburg, Sweden, and learned the game at Albatross Golf Club, situated on the island Hisingen in the northern part of the city of Gothenburg. He was also a member at Strömstad Golf Club, near the Norwegian border, where he won the club championship at 16 years of age.

After twice winning the yearly 72-hole tournament Gothenburg Open at his home club, but never been nominated to any national amateur teams, he turned professional after the 1981 season, sponsored by a member of his club.

== Professional career ==
He qualified for the European Tour on his first visit to Qualifying School and finished tied 16h at his first European Tour start, the 1982 Tunisian Open. The year after he won his first professional tournament, the Swedish PGA Championship. The following year, the Swedish Golf Tour (SGT) was established and Lanner came to win ten times on his domestic tour, still the most by any player ever, despite three of his wins in Sweden did not count as SGT-events.

Lanner's victory at the 1987 Epson Grand Prix of Europe Matchplay Championship at St Pierre Golf & Country Club in Wales, was the second European Tour win by a Swedish player, after the victory by Ove Sellberg the year before, coincidentally at the same tournament, the only match-play tournament on the European Tour schedule these years, beside the invitation tournament World Matchplay Championship.

Lanner was a member of the European Tour until 2001, with just a couple of breaks when he failed to retain his card. He won three times on the main tour and two times on the second tier Challenge Tour. His last win came in 1998, when he was invited to the Madeira Island Open as a former winner of the tournament and went on to win there again.

His best European Tour Order of Merit finish was 19th in 1987. Lanner was close to qualify for one of twelve spots in the European Ryder Cup team, as the first Swedish player ever, that year. The top nine players on the Order of Merit after the German Open would automatically qualify and three players would be picked by the European team captain Tony Jacklin. Prior to the final event, Eamonn Darcy was in the 9th qualifying place with Lanner in 10th. Despite starting with a 62 and leading after the first round, Lanner finished one shot ahead of Darcy in the German Open, but Darcy retained his qualifying place and Jacklin did not choose Lanner among his captain's picks.

In May 1989, Lanner reached a career best 84th on the Official World Golf Ranking. At the 1989 World Cup at Las Brisas Golf Club in Marbella, Spain, the Swedish team of Lanner and Ove Sellberg finished tied 3rd with United States, behind Australia and Spain. Lanner finished 8th individually.

Lanner was a member of the winning Swedish team at the 1991 Dunhill Cup at the Old Course, St Andrews, Scotland. He holed the winning putt for his team in the final match of the tournament, between Sweden and South Africa, on the first playoff hole in the last game, played between Lanner and Gary Player.

After retiring as a player in 2002, Lanner began a career as a referee on the European Tour.

== Personal life ==
Lanner got the opportunity to turn professional in the fall of 1981, when he received sponsorship from Jan-Ove Johansson, the founder of Albatross Golf Club, through the company Swedish Sports Promotion, later forming the team Club Vagabond, consisting of four young Swedish golf professionals. The company organized an exhibition with Jack Nicklaus at Barsebäck Golf & Country Club on 15 September 1983, in which Lanner also took part, with economic loss for the organizer and the company later went bankrupt. This meant that the company could not fulfill its obligations to Lanner, who during 1984 became personal responsible for his arising costs on tour. In September 1984, when Lanner also had lost his playing rights on the European Tour, he won pro tournaments in Sweden on three straight weeks and earned the possibility to restart his career.

Lanner's son Tobias (born 1997) has played as an amateur on the Swedish professional mini-tour Future Series.

== Awards and honors ==
- In 1985, he earned Elite Sign No. 80 by the Swedish Golf Federation, on the basis of national championship performances.
- In 1992, the three teammates at the Swedish Dunhill Cup victory the previous year, Per-Ulrik Johansson, Lanner and Anders Forsbrand, was each, by the Swedish Golf Federation, awarded the Golden Club, the highest award for contributions to Swedish golf, as the 11th, 12th and 13th recipients.
- In 1998, Lanner was awarded honorary member of the PGA of Sweden.

== Amateur wins ==
- 1979 Opel Cup (Forsbacka GC)
- 1980 Gothenburg Open
- 1981 Öijaredspriset, Gothenburg Open, Strömstad-Driven

== Professional wins (16) ==
=== European Tour wins (3) ===
No.	Date	Tournament	Winning score	Margin of victory	Runner(s)-up
1	10 May 1987	Epson Grand Prix of Europe Matchplay Championship	1 up		(South Africa) Jeff Hawkes
2	16 Jan 1994	Madeira Island Open	−10 (70-67-69=206) (Note: Shortened to 36 holes due to weather.)	2 strokes	(England) Howard Clark, (Sweden) Mathias Grönberg, (Sweden) Peter Hedblom
3	21 Jun 1998	Madeira Island Open (2)	−11 (70-66-68-73=277)	1 stroke	(New Zealand) Stephen Scahill

=== Challenge Tour wins (4) ===
No.	Date	Tournament	Winning score	Margin of victory	Runner(s)-up
7	11 Jun 1989	Teleannons Grand Prix	−8 (73-68-70=211)	Playoff	(Sweden) Magnus Grankvist, (Sweden) Mikael Karlsson, (Sweden) Ove Sellberg
8	13 Aug 1989	Gevalia Open	−13 (69-69-70-67=275)	Playoff	(Sweden) Joakim Haeggman
3	18 Aug 1991	Gefle Open (2)	−19 (64-71-68-66=269)	1 stroke	(Sweden) Magnus Rosenbäck
4	4 Oct 1998	Telia Grand Prix (2)	E (71-70-74-69=284)	Playoff	(Denmark) Morten Backhausen, (Sweden) Per Nyman

Challenge Tour playoff record (3–0)

No.	Year	Tournament	Opponent(s)	Result
1	1989	Teleannons Grand Prix	(Sweden) Magnus Grankvist, (Sweden) Mikael Karlsson, (Sweden) Ove Sellberg	Won with eagle on third extra hole
2	1989	Gevalia Open	(Sweden) Joakim Haeggman	Won with birdie on second extra hole
3	1998	Telia Grand Prix	(Denmark) Morten Backhausen, (Sweden) Per Nyman	Won with birdie on first extra hole

=== Swedish Golf Tour wins (7) ===
No.	Date	Tournament	Winning score	Margin of victory	Runner(s)-up
1	23 Sep 1984	Stiab Grand Prix	20 holes		(Sweden) Magnus Persson
2	30 Sep 1984	Kullenburg Play-Off	−3 (72-73-69-71=285)	7 strokes	(Sweden) Anders Forsbrand, (Sweden) Tommy Jansson
3	16 Jun 1985	Owell Open	−5 (71-70-71-71=283)	7 strokes	(Sweden) Anders Forsbrand
4	11 Aug 1985	SI Wang Open	−12 (67-71-70-68=276)	7 strokes	(Sweden) Nils Lindeblad
5	6 Jul 1986	SI Trygg-Hansa Open	−7 (71-74-64=209)	3 strokes	(Sweden) Thomas Engström
6	17 Aug 1986	Gevalia Open	−11 (72-63-73-69=277)	6 strokes	(Denmark) Anders Sørensen
7	16 Aug 1987	Gevalia Open (2)	−8 (72-69-71-68=280)	3 strokes	(Sweden) Mikael Högberg

=== Other wins (2) ===
No.	Date	Tournament	Winning score	Margin of victory	Runner-up
1	7 Aug 1983	Swedish PGA Championship	E (74-75-70-73=292)	3 strokes	(Sweden) Per-Arne Brostedt
2	15 Sep 1984	Ingarö Mästermöte	−11 (66-67-70-70=273)	4 strokes	(Sweden) Freddy Carlson

== Results in major championships ==
Tournament	1987	1988	1989	1990	1991	1992	1993	1994
The Open Championship	T50	CUT			CUT	T28		T51

Note: Lanner only played in The Open Championship.

Did not play

CUT = missed the half-way cut
"T" = tied

== Team appearances ==
Professional

- Alfred Dunhill Cup (representing Sweden): 1986, 1987, 1989, 1990, 1991 (winners)
- World Cup of Golf (representing Sweden): 1987, 1989, 1990
- Europcar Cup (representing Sweden): 1988 (winners)

== See also ==
- List of golfers with most Challenge Tour wins
