= Rya, Sweden =

Rya
- Location within Västra Götaland Location within Sweden
- Coordinates: 57°42′N 12°22′E
- Country: Sweden
- Province: Västergötland
- County: Västra Götaland County
- Municipality: Härryda Municipality

Area
  - Total: 0.62 km^{2} (0.24 sq mi)

Population (31 December 2010)
  - Total: 290
  - Density: 469/km^{2} (1,210/sq mi)
- Time zone: UTC+1 (CET)
  - Summer (DST): UTC+2 (CEST)

Rya is a locality situated in Härryda Municipality, Västra Götaland County, Sweden. It had 290 inhabitants in 2010.
