= Magnus Persson Atlevi =

Swedish professional golfer

Personal information
- Full name: Magnus Persson Atlevi
- Nationality: Sweden
- Born: 26 July 1965 (age 61) Klippan, Sweden
- Height: 1.75 m (5 ft 9 in)
- Weight: 75 kg (165 lb; 11.8 st)
- Spouse: Elisabeth Atlevi (m. 1999)

Career
- Sport: Golf
- Turned professional: 1982
- Current tour: European Senior Tour
- Former tours: European Tour; PGA Tour of Australasia; Challenge Tour; Swedish Golf Tour
- Professional wins: 16

Number of wins by tour
- Challenge Tour: 3
- European Senior Tour: 2
- Other: 11

Best results in major championships
- Masters Tournament: DNP
- PGA Championship: DNP
- U.S. Open: DNP
- The Open Championship: T39: 1985

Achievements and awards
- Swedish Golfer of the Year: 1982
- European Senior Tour Rookie of the Year: 2016

Magnus Persson Atlevi (born 26 July 1965) is a Swedish professional golfer. He competed as Magnus Persson, during the main part of his career on the regular tours, until his marriage to Elisabeth Atlevi in 1999. Persson won three times on the Challenge Tour and twice on the European Senior Tour. He also lost in playoffs, twice on the European Tour and once on the PGA Tour of Australia.

== Amateur career ==
As a golf prodigy, Persson became a scratch player at age 15, at the time the youngest ever in Sweden, and at 16 reached a +1 handicap, as one of just four players in the country. At just 15 years of age, Persson finished runner-up and low foreign contestant at the 1980 Orange Bowl International Junior Championship in Coral Gables, Florida, after winning a playoff for second place with Stephen Ames and Paul Way. The year after, he repeated his low foreign contestant finish at Orange Bowl, again after a playoff against Stephen Ames, and a total sixth place.

Persson won the European final of the 1981 Doug Sanders International Junior Championship, for players up to 18 years of age, at Hazlehead Golf Club, Scotland.

His last year playing as an amateur, he qualified for the 1982 Open Championship at Royal Troon Golf Club, aged only 16. This year, he also won the amateur tournament Martini Cup at Rya Golf Club, Helsingborg, Sweden, with a 72-hole score 8 under par and the Swedish Junior Stroke-play Championship at the same course.

Persson was a member of the tied second-placed Sweden amateur team at the 1982 Eisenhower Trophy in Lausanne, Switzerland, in September. Persson made a four feet birdie putt at his 72nd hole to give Sweden a silver medal, shared with Japan, seven strokes behind United States.

At the end of 1982, he was named Swedish Golfer of the Year, male and female, by far the youngest player ever and the last time an amateur received the award.

== Professional career ==
A sponsor agreement with car manufacturer Saab Automobile made it possible for Persson and two of his teammates from the 1982 Eisenhower Trophy, Ove Sellberg and Krister Kinell, to turn professional and form Team Saab, granted support and financial possibilities to compete on the European Tour. He successfully progressed through the 1982 European Tour Qualifying School, at La Manga, Spain, in November, finishing tied 7th and earned his first pay check. At the age of 17, he was the youngest player ever to win a European Tour card.

As a pro, he followed his 1982 Open Championship participation, by also qualifying the following three years, with a career best tied 39th finish in 1985. He would go on to start in The Open Championship totally eight times.

In 1986, he won the Swedish PGA Championship (that year named PGA Club Sweden Open) at a course, Lindö in Stockholm at Björn Borg Sports Club, designed 10 years earlier by his father Åke Persson, one of Sweden's most respected golf course architects at the time. Persson would go on to win the same title for a second time 24 years later, at 45 years of age.

Persson was twice a runner-up on the European Tour, losing in a sudden-death playoff on the sixth extra hole against Gordon Brand Jnr at the 1987 Scandinavian Enterprise Open on home soil in Stockholm, Sweden and also losing out in a playoff at the 1990 Open Renault de Baleares on Mallorca, Spain, to Seve Ballesteros. At the Mallorca tournament, Person led by five strokes before the last round and kept that lead with ten holes remaining, playing in the last group with Ballesteros. At the last hole Persson, still with a one-shot-advantage, found his ball plugged in a bunker, while Ballesteros' ball went playable despite a hooked drive into the gallery. Ballesteros went on to make a birdie and won the tournament in a sudden-death playoff.

1990 would become Perssons best season, finishing 30th on the European Tour Order of Merit. He lost his card at the end of the 1991 season and struggled to regain it the following years. In 2001, on his 11th visit to the Qualifying School Finals in as many years, Persson regained his European Tour card.

Persson won three times on the European Challenge Tour, the first title coming in the 1992 Perrier European Pro-Am at Brussels Golf Club, Belgium, the second in the 1993 Torneo Istantilla Golf, at Islantilla Golf Club, Huelva, Spain and the third in the 1998 Is Molas Challenge at Is Molas Golf Club in Sardinia, Italy.

In 2009, Persson became Tournament Director of the Swedish Golf Tour, at the time named the Nordea Tour. He also started to branch out into golf course design, having created one course in Sweden and one in Finland together with his architect father.

Persson also found interest in playing golf with hickory sticks and twice, 2012 and 2013, won the Swedish Hickory Championship.

Turning 50, Persson entered the 2015 Senior Tour Qualifying School. He had a European Senior Tour card in his grasp before he four-putted the final green for a double bogey, missing out by one shot. He secured his card for the 2016 European Senior Tour tying for third in the 2016 Senior Tour Qualifying School, having led the field after rounds two and three. Persson won the 2016 Paris Legends Championship and went on to finish second on the 2016 European Senior Tour Order of Merit, becoming Rookie of the Year. In 2018, he finished runner-up at the Staysure PGA Seniors Championship, the oldest important seniors tournament in Europe, before winning the European Tour Properties Senior Classic.

Around 60 years of age, Persson mainly retired from tournament golf, to work as an instructing professional at Kävlinge Golf Club in southern Sweden.

== Amateur wins ==
- 1981 Flygt National Junior (Kalmar GC), Doug Sanders International Junior Championship Europe
- 1982 Swedish Junior Stroke-play Championship, Martini Cup (Rya GC)

== Professional wins (16) ==
=== Challenge Tour wins (3) ===
No.	Date	Tournament	Winning score	Margin of victory	Runner(s)-up
1	30 Aug 1992	Perrier European Pro-Am	−3 (74-69-70=213)	2 strokes	(Sweden) Mathias Grönberg
2	2 May 1993	Torneo Istantilla Golf	−5 (70-73-70-70=283)	1 stroke	(Spain) Antonio Garrido
3	5 Apr 1998	Is Molas Challenge	−5 (69-71-69-74=283)	2 strokes	(France) Thomas Levet, (France) Christophe Pottier

Challenge Tour playoff record (0–1)

No.	Year	Tournament	Opponent	Result
1	2001	Telia Grand Prix	(Wales) Jamie Donaldson	Lost to par on third extra hole

=== Nordic Golf League wins (2) ===
No.	Date	Tournament	Winning score	Margin of victory	Runner-up
1	21 Sep 2008	Visma Masters	−11 (71-68-66=205)	2 strokes	(Finland) Toni Hakula (a)
2	18 Sep 2010	PEAB PGA Open	+3 (71-71-77=219)	4 strokes	(Sweden) Mark Larsson

=== Swedish Golf Tour wins (2) ===
No.	Date	Tournament	Winning score	Margin of victory	Runner-up
1	24 Aug 1986	PGA Club Sweden Open	−3 (71-67-70-77=285)	Playoff	(Sweden) Magnus Grankvist
2	28 Sep 1986	Owell Open	−8 (67-73-68=208)	6 strokes	(Sweden) Anders Forsbrand

=== Other wins (7) ===
- 1983 Gevalia Open
- 1984 Kvällsposten Masters
- 2009 Svalöv Open (Swedish Minitour)
- 2011 Guldpokalen (Swedish Minitour)
- 2013 Swedish PGA Club Pro Championship
- 2022 Swedish PGA Club Pro Championship
- 2023 Swedish PGA Club Pro Championship

=== European Senior Tour wins (2) ===
No.	Date	Tournament	Winning score	Margin of victory	Runner(s)-up
1	11 Sep 2016	Paris Legends Championship	−8 (70-66-69=205)	2 strokes	(Wales) Stephen Dodd, (England) Philip Golding, (Wales) Mark Mouland
2	9 Sep 2018	European Tour Properties Senior Classic	−14 (66-66-67=199)	3 strokes	(Wales) Stephen Dodd

== Playoff record ==
European Tour playoff record (0–2)

No.	Year	Tournament	Opponent	Result
1	1987	Scandinavian Enterprise Open	(Scotland) Gordon Brand Jnr	Lost to birdie on first extra hole
2	1990	Open Renault de Baleares	(Spain) Seve Ballesteros	Lost to par on first extra hole

PGA Tour of Australia playoff record (0–1)

No.	Year	Tournament	Opponent	Result
1	1986	Foster's Tasmanian Open	(Australia) Stewart Ginn	Lost to birdie on second extra hole

== Results in major championships ==
Tournament	1982	1983	1984	1985	1986	1987	1988	1989
The Open Championship	CUT	CUT	CUT	T39		CUT	CUT	

Tournament	1990	1991	1992	1993	1994	1995	1996	1997	1998	1999
The Open Championship		T101								

Tournament	2000	2001	2002
The Open Championship			CUT

Note: Persson Atlevi only played in The Open Championship.

Did not play

CUT = missed the half-way cut (3rd round cut in 1984 Open Championship)
"T" = tied

== Team appearances ==
Amateur

- European Boys' Team Championship (representing Sweden): 1980
- Jacques Léglise Trophy (representing the Continent of Europe): 1980, 1981
- European Youths' Team Championship (representing Sweden): 1981, 1982
- St Andrews Trophy (representing the Continent of Europe): 1982 (winners)
- Eisenhower Trophy (representing Sweden): 1982

Professional

- Hennessy Cognac Cup (representing Sweden): 1984
- Alfred Dunhill Cup (representing Sweden): 1988, 1989, 1990
- World Cup (representing Sweden): 1983, 1984, 1990
- Europcar Cup (representing Sweden): 1988 (winners)
