= Scandinavian Enterprise Open =

Golf tournament in Sweden

Tournament information
- Location: Stockholm, Sweden
- Established: 1973
- Course: Royal Drottningholm Golf Club
- Par: 72
- Tour: European Tour
- Format: Stroke play
- Prize fund: £400,000
- Month played: June
- Final year: 1990

Tournament record score
- Aggregate: 268 Ronan Rafferty (1989); 268 Craig Stadler (1990)
- To par: −20 as above

Final champion
- (United States) Craig Stadler
- Location in Sweden

The Scandinavian Enterprise Open was a golf tournament on the European Tour that was played in Sweden until 1990, when it had a prize fund of £400,000, which was mid-range for the tour at that time.

In 1991, the tournament was merged with fellow Sweden-based European Tour event, the PLM Open, with the resultant tournament being called the Scandinavian Masters.

== Tournament highlights ==
- 1973: Bob Charles won the inaugural edition of the tournament; he finished two strokes ahead of Tony Jacklin, Hedley Muscroft, and Vin Baker.
- 1974: Jacklin won by 11 strokes over José María Cañizares despite a final round 75.
- 1977: Seve Ballesteros was struck by lightning on the 14th fairway during the second round of play. He escaped major injury and continued playing. Earlier in the same day Ballesteros got in a rules dispute when Lon Hinkle accused him of marking his ball incorrectly.
- 1980: Greg Norman returned a 64 in the final round to win by three strokes at Vasatorp
- 1983: Played for the first time at the newly created Ullna Course, designed by the tournament founder Sven Tumba, Sam Torrance won on the final hole over playing partner, American Craig Stadler.
- 1987: Magnus Persson's attempt to become the Scandinavian Enterprise Open's first Swedish winner was foiled when Gordon Brand Jnr defeated him on the first hole of a sudden-death playoff.
- 1988: Ballesteros won the Scandinavian Open for a third time; he finished five strokes ahead of Gerry Taylor.
- 1990: Stadler returned a final round 61 to win the last edition of the tournament by four strokes over Craig Parry; it was his fourth appearance, after twice finishing as runner-up.

== Winners ==
| Year | Winner | Score | To par | Margin of victory | Runner(s)-up | Winner's share (€) | Venue |
|---|---|---|---|---|---|---|---|
| 1990 | (United States) Craig Stadler | 268 | −20 | 4 strokes | (Australia) Craig Parry | 93,324 | Drottningholm |
| 1989 | (Northern Ireland) Ronan Rafferty | 268 | −20 | 2 strokes | (United States) Michael Allen | 78,134 | Drottningholm |
| 1988 | (Spain) Seve Ballesteros (3) | 270 | −18 | 5 strokes | (Australia) Gerry Taylor | 58,324 | Drottningholm |
| 1987 | (Scotland) Gordon Brand Jnr | 277 | −11 | Playoff | (Sweden) Magnus Persson | 45,084 | Ullna |
| 1986 | (New Zealand) Greg Turner | 270 | −18 | Playoff | (United States) Craig Stadler | 35,750 | Ullna |
| 1985 | (Australia) Ian Baker-Finch | 274 | −14 | 2 strokes | (Australia) Graham Marsh | 30,068 | Ullna |
| 1984 | (Wales) Ian Woosnam | 280 | −4 | 6 strokes | (Australia) Mike Clayton | 31,890 | Ullna |
| 1983 | (Scotland) Sam Torrance | 280 | −8 | 1 stroke | (United States) Craig Stadler | 19,952 | Ullna |
| 1982 | (United States) Bob Byman (2) | 275 | −9 | 3 strokes | (Scotland) Sam Torrance | 15,400 | Linköping |
| 1981 | (Spain) Seve Ballesteros (2) | 273 | −11 | 5 strokes | (Spain) Antonio Garrido | 11,662 | Linköping |
| 1980 | (Australia) Greg Norman | 276 | −12 | 3 strokes | (England) Mark James | 11,600 | Vasatorp |
| 1979 | (Scotland) Sandy Lyle | 276 | −12 | 3 strokes | (Spain) Seve Ballesteros | 7,421 | Vasatorp |
| 1978 | (Spain) Seve Ballesteros | 279 | −9 | 1 stroke | (South Africa) Dale Hayes | 9,722 | Vasatorp |
| 1977 | (United States) Bob Byman | 275 | −13 | 1 stroke | (South Africa) Hugh Baiocchi | 12,641 | Drottningholm |
| 1976 | (South Africa) Hugh Baiocchi | 271 | −17 | 2 strokes | (Republic of Ireland) Eamonn Darcy | 8,860 | Drottningholm |
| 1975 | (United States) George Burns | 279 | −5 | Playoff | (Australia) Graham Marsh | 7,633 | Bokskogen |
| 1974 | (England) Tony Jacklin | 279 | −5 | 11 strokes | (Spain) José María Cañizares | 7,000 | Bokskogen |
| 1973 | (New Zealand) Bob Charles | 278 | −10 | 2 strokes | (South Africa) Vin Baker (England) Tony Jacklin (England) Hedley Muscroft | 4,074 | Drottningholm |
