= Ove Sellberg =

Swedish professional golfer (born 1959)

Personal information
- Full name: Ove Bertil Sellberg
- Nationality: Sweden
- Born: 15 October 1959 (age 67) Stockholm, Sweden
- Height: 1.83 m (6 ft 0 in)
- Weight: 76 kg (168 lb; 12.0 st)
- Life partner: Mimi Lundberg

Career
- Sport: Golf
- Turned professional: 1982
- Former tour: European Tour
- Professional wins: 6
- Highest ranking: 98 (4 June 1989)

Number of wins by tour
- European Tour: 3

Best results in major championships
- Masters Tournament: DNP
- PGA Championship: DNP
- U.S. Open: DNP
- The Open Championship: T32: 1985

Achievements and awards
- Swedish Golfer of the Year: 1986

Ove Bertil Sellberg (born 15 October 1959) is a Swedish professional golfer who played on the European Tour. He was the first Swede to win a European Tour event.

== Amateur career ==
In 1959, Sellberg was born in Stockholm. He began playing golf, 10-years-old, at Ågesta Golf Club. At 16 years of age, he lost in the final of the 1976 Swedish Junior Match-play Championship, but won the tournament three years later, when the format was changed to stroke-play.

In 1981, as a 21-year-old amateur, he took part in the Spanish Open on the European Tour and finished tied 24th.

He was a member of the tied second-placed Sweden amateur team at the Eisenhower Trophy in Lausanne, Switzerland, in September 1982, himself finishing tied 6th individually.

== Professional career ==
A sponsor agreement with car manufacturer Saab Automobile made it possible for Sellberg and two of his teammates from the 1982 Eisenhower Trophy, Magnus Persson and Krister Kinell, to turn professional and form Team Saab, granted support and financial possibilities to compete on the European Tour. He successfully progressed through the 1982 European Tour Qualifying School, at La Manga, Spain, in November, finishing tied 5th and earned his first pay check.

He played on the European Tour through most of the 1980s and 1990s, twice finishing in the top-20 of the Order of Merit, in 1986 and 1987. He won three tournaments on the tour during a five-year-span.

When he defeated Howard Clark in the final of the 1986 Epson Grand Prix of Europe Match Play Championship at St. Pierre Golf & Country Club in Chepstow, South Wales, Sellberg became the first Swede to win a European Tour event. He had further wins in the 1989 Open Renault de Baleares on Mallorca, Spain and the 1990 Peugeot-Trends Belgian Open at Royal Waterloo GC, Belgium.

Sellberg represented Sweden four times in the World Cup, 1983, 1985, 1987 and 1989, with some success. The team finished 11th, 9th, 7th and 3rd, respectively, every time an all-time best for Sweden. In 1987, Sellberg finished tied 7th in the individual competition. He represented Sweden in the Dunhill Cup five years in a row.

Sellberg was CEO of PGA Sweden National from 2008 to 2016, running the golf resort south of Bara, east of Malmö, Sweden.

== Awards and honors ==
- In 1984, Sellberg earned Elite Sign No. 72 by the Swedish Golf Federation, on the basis of national team appearances and national championship performances.
- In 1986, he earned the Swedish Golfer of the Year award
- In 1998, Sellberg was awarded honorary member of the PGA of Sweden.
- In 2000, at the opening of the Swedish Golf Museum, he was one of ten players, among names such as Annika Sörenstam and Jesper Parnevik, presented as important in the history of Swedish golf.

== Amateur wins ==
- 1979 Swedish Junior Stroke-play Championship
- 1981 Scandinavian Foursome (Kungsbacka GC) (with Anders Forsbrand)
- 1982 Guldpokalen (Båstad GC), In Wear-Martinique Open (Kristianstad GC), Ågestakanonen (Ågesta GC)

== Professional wins (6) ==
=== European Tour wins (3) ===
No.	Date	Tournament	Winning score	Margin of victory	Runner(s)-up
1	11 May 1986	Epson Grand Prix of Europe Matchplay Championship	3 and 2		(England) Howard Clark
2	13 Mar 1989	Open Renault de Baleares	−9 (68-71-69-71=279)	2 strokes	(Zimbabwe) Mark McNulty, (Spain) José María Olazábal, (Wales) Philip Parkin
3	13 May 1990	Peugeot-Trends Belgian Open	−16 (68-66-67-71=272)	4 strokes	(Wales) Ian Woosnam

=== Swedish Golf Tour wins (2) ===
No.	Date	Tournament	Winning score	Margin of victory	Runner(s)-up
1	2 Jun 1985	Martini Cup	−7 (76-68-69-68=281)	4 strokes	(Sweden) Krister Kinell, (Sweden) Magnus Persson
2	18 Sep 1988	Esab Open	−11 (68-68-69=205)	6 strokes	(Sweden) Jesper Parnevik

=== Other wins (1) ===
- 1983 SAAB Cup (Sweden)

== Playoff record ==
Challenge Tour playoff record (0–1)

No.	Year	Tournament	Opponents	Result
1	1989	Teleannons Grand Prix	(Sweden) Magnus Grankvist, (Sweden) Mikael Karlsson, (Sweden) Mats Lanner	Lanner won with eagle on third extra hole

== Results in major championships ==
Tournament	1985	1986	1987	1988
The Open Championship	T32	CUT	T57	CUT

Note: Sellberg only played in The Open Championship.
CUT = missed the half-way cut
"T" = tied

== Team appearances ==
Amateur

- Jacques Léglise Trophy (representing Continent of Europe): 1977 (winners)
- European Youths' Team Championship (representing Sweden): 1978, 1979, 1981
- EGA Trophy (representing the Continent of Europe): 1978
- European Amateur Team Championship (representing Sweden): 1981
- Eisenhower Trophy (representing Sweden): 1982

Professional

- World Cup (representing Sweden): 1983, 1985, 1987, 1989
- Hennessy Cognac Cup (representing Sweden): 1984
- Dunhill Cup (representing Sweden): 1986, 1987, 1988, 1989, 1990
