= Anders Forsbrand =

Swedish professional golfer (born 1961)

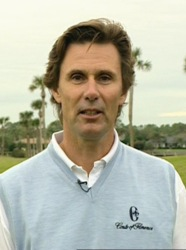

Personal information
- Full name: Anders Gunnar Vilhelm Forsbrand
- Nationality: Sweden
- Born: 1 April 1961 (age 65) Filipstad, Sweden
- Height: 1.85 m (6 ft 1 in)
- Weight: 85 kg (187 lb; 13.4 st)
- Spouse: Stewart
- Children: 2

Career
- Sport: Golf
- Turned professional: 1981
- Current tours: European Senior Tour; Champions Tour
- Former tour: European Tour
- Professional wins: 16
- Highest ranking: 35 (18 October 1992)

Number of wins by tour
- European Tour: 6
- European Senior Tour: 1
- Other: 9

Best results in major championships
- Masters Tournament: T11: 1993
- PGA Championship: T9: 1992
- U.S. Open: T32: 1996
- The Open Championship: T4: 1994

Achievements and awards
- Swedish Golfer of the Year: 1984, 1987, 1992

Anders Gunnar Vilhelm Forsbrand (born 1 April 1961) is a Swedish professional golfer who formerly competed on the European Tour.

== Early life ==
Forsbrand was born in Filipstad, Sweden. He began playing golf at Uddeholm Golf Club, a small club with a 9-hole course in Värmland, Sweden. He later came to represent nearby and bigger Karlstad Golf Club, with an 18-hole course and better practice facilities. His younger brother Vilhelm, born 1970, also became a professional golfer and came to win twice on the Challenge Tour.

Forsbrand won the unofficial 1977 Swedish Youth Championship, Colgate Cup, at his age level (16 years old).

== Amateur career ==
In June 1980, Forsbrand won the Swedish Junior Stroke-play Championship in rainy conditions at Växjö Golf Club. A month later, he was part of the Swedish team, winning the 1981 European Youths' Team Championship in Dusserldorf, Germany.

He represented Sweden at the 1981 European Amateur Team Championship at the Old Course at St Andrews, Scotland. It earned some attention that Forsbrand, in a playoff against Ian Hutcheon, Scotland, hooked his drive, on the first hole on the Old Course, over the 18th fairway out of bounds in to the town.

== Professional career ==
In November 1981, Forsbrand borrowed money from his local club pro, turned professional and traveled by train in four days to the European Tour Qualifying School at the Algarve coast in Portugal. He finished tied 8th, easy qualified for the next season and took the train for another four-day journey back home to Sweden.

His first professional win was the 1982 Swedish PGA Championship, at the time the most important domestic pro tournament before the Swedish Golf Tour was founded two years later.

He played on the European Tour from 1982 until 2003. In 1987, he became the first Swede to win a stroke-play tournament on the European Tour. He won six individual titles on the European Tour and finished in the top 25 of the Order of Merit seven times, with a best of fourth place in 1992. In 1993, he became the first Swedish golfer to play in all four major championships in the same year.

Forsbrand led Sweden to victories in the two most prestigious professional nation team tournaments, the World Cup and the Dunhill Cup, within three weeks in October and November 1991. Together with Per-Ulrik Johansson, he was close to defend the 1991 World Cup title from Rome, Italy for Sweden in 1992 in Madrid, Spain, but the Swedish team finished second, one shot behind the United States team of Fred Couples and Davis Love III. Forsbrand finished third individually both in 1991 and 1992 (tied).

At the 1994 Open Championship, he shot 130 over the final two rounds and tied for fourth, a finish which was overshadowed in Swedish media by Jesper Parnevik's second place.

Forsbrand finished in the top 13 of the European Tour Order of Merit four times but made the European Ryder Cup team; his best year (1992, when he finished fourth) was not a Ryder Cup year and he could not continue his good form until the selection of the team the year after. Despite this, in 2004 Bernhard Langer named Forsbrand as his vice-captain for the 35th Ryder Cup Matches against the United States at Oakland Hills Country Club, Michigan, U.S., in which the European team had a resounding victory over the U.S. team.

Forsbrand began playing on the European Senior Tour after turning 50 in 2011. In August 2012, he won the SSE Scottish Senior Open, becoming the first Swede to win on the European Senior Tour.

== Personal life ==
Forsbrand now lives in Ponte Vedra Beach, Florida, with his wife, Stewart, and their children Alexander and Margaux.

== Awards and honors ==
- In 1984, he earned Elite Sign No. 76 by the Swedish Golf Federation, on the basis of national team appearances and national championship performances.
- Forsbrand was three times awarded Swedish Golfer of the Year: 1984, 1987 and 1992
- In 1992, the three teammates at the 1991 Dunhill Cup victory, Per-Ulrik Johansson, Mats Lanner and Forsbrand was each, by the Swedish Golf Federation, awarded the Golden Club, the highest award for contributions to Swedish golf, as the 11th, 12th and 13th recipients.
- In 1998, he was awarded honorary member of the PGA of Sweden.

== Amateur wins ==
- 1980 Swedish Junior Strokeplay Championship

== Professional wins (19) ==
=== European Tour wins (6) ===
No.	Date	Tournament	Winning score	Margin of victory	Runner-up
1	6 Sep 1987	Ebel European Masters Swiss Open	−25 (71-64-66-62=263)	3 strokes	(Wales) Mark Mouland
2	31 Mar 1991	Volvo Open di Firenze	−14 (71-72-66-65=274)	1 stroke	(England) Barry Lane
3	29 Mar 1992	Volvo Open di Firenze (2)	−13 (69-69-67-66=271)	1 stroke	(Australia) Peter Senior
4	26 Apr 1992	Credit Lyonnais Cannes Open	−15 (65-70-68-70=273)	1 stroke	(Sweden) Per-Ulrik Johansson
5	23 Jan 1994	Moroccan Open	−12 (70-68-69-69=276)	4 strokes	(England) Howard Clark
6	8 Oct 1995	Mercedes German Masters	−24 (64-64-67-69=264)	2 strokes	(Germany) Bernhard Langer

European Tour playoff record (0–3)

No.	Year	Tournament	Opponent(s)	Result
1	1992	BMW International Open	(United States) Paul Azinger, (United States) Glen Day, (England) Mark James, (Germany) Bernhard Langer	Azinger won with birdie on first extra hole
2	1992	Canon European Masters	(England) Jamie Spence	Lost to birdie on second extra hole
3	1993	Scandinavian Masters	(England) Peter Baker	Lost to par on second extra hole

=== Swedish Golf Tour wins (2) ===
No.	Date	Tournament	Winning score	Margin of victory	Runner-up
1	11 Aug 1984	Swedish International Stroke Play Championship	−9 (69-71-71-68=279)	5 strokes	(New Zealand) Peter Hamblett
2	18 Aug 1984	Gevalia Open	−8 (72-71-64-71=278)	4 strokes	(Sweden) Claes Hultman

=== Other wins (6) ===
No.	Date	Tournament	Winning score	Margin of victory	Runner(s)-up
1	11 Jul 1982	Hook Pro-Am	75-69=144	3 strokes	(Sweden) Per Göran Nilsson
2	22 Aug 1982	Swedish PGA Championship	+5 (76-73-71-73=293)	4 strokes	(Sweden) Per-Arne Brostedt, (England) John Cockin
3	19 Sep 1983	Stiab GP	3 and 1		(Sweden) Göran Knutsson
4	3 Nov 1991	World Cup (with (Sweden) Per-Ulrik Johansson)	−13 (142-148-134-139=563)	1 stroke	Wales − Phillip Price and Ian Woosnam
5	10 Nov 1991	Benson & Hedges Trophy (with (Sweden) Helen Alfredsson)	−13 (73-66-68-68=275)	2 strokes	(England) Penny Grice-Whittaker and (England) Malcolm MacKenzie, (United States) Bryan Norton and (United States) Pearl Sinn
6	15 Sep 1992	Equity & Law Challenge	20 points	3 points	(England) Russell Claydon
7	12 Oct 1997	Open Novotel Perrier (with (Sweden) Michael Jonzon)	−12 (75-74-64-140=343)	Playoff	(Spain) Santiago Luna and (Spain) José Rivero

=== European Senior Tour wins (1) ===
No.	Date	Tournament	Winning score	Margin of victory	Runners-up
1	19 Aug 2012	SSE Scottish Senior Open	−17 (66-66-67=199)	1 stroke	(England) Philip Golding

== Results in major championships ==
Tournament	1984	1985	1986	1987	1988	1989	1990	1991	1992	1993	1994	1995	1996
Masters Tournament										T11	CUT		
U.S. Open									T33	CUT			T32
The Open Championship	CUT	T8	T16	T29	CUT			T38	T34	CUT	T4	T49	CUT
PGA Championship									T9	CUT	CUT		

Top 10
Did not play

CUT = missed the half-way cut (3rd round cut in 1984 Open Championship)
"T" indicates a tie for a place

=== Summary ===
Tournament	Wins	2nd	3rd	Top-5	Top-10	Top-25	Events	Cuts made
Masters Tournament	0	0	0	0	0	1	2	1
U.S. Open	0	0	0	0	0	0	3	2
The Open Championship	0	0	0	1	2	3	11	7
PGA Championship	0	0	0	0	1	1	3	1
Totals	0	0	0	1	3	5	19	11

- Most consecutive cuts made – 5 (1991 Open Championship – 1993 Masters)
- Longest streak of top-10s – 1 (three times)

== Team appearances ==
Amateur

- Jacques Léglise Trophy (representing the Continent of Europe): 1978 (winners)
- European Youths' Team Championship (representing Sweden): 1978, 1980 (winners), 1981
- European Amateur Team Championship (representing Sweden): 1981

Professional

- Hennessy Cognac Cup (representing Sweden): 1984
- World Cup (representing Sweden): 1984, 1985, 1988, 1991 (winners), 1992, 1993
- Dunhill Cup (representing Sweden): 1986, 1987, 1988, 1991 (winners), 1992, 1993, 1994
- Europcar Cup (representing Sweden): 1986 (winners)
- Kirin Cup (representing Europe): 1988
