= Jesper Parnevik =

Swedish professional golfer

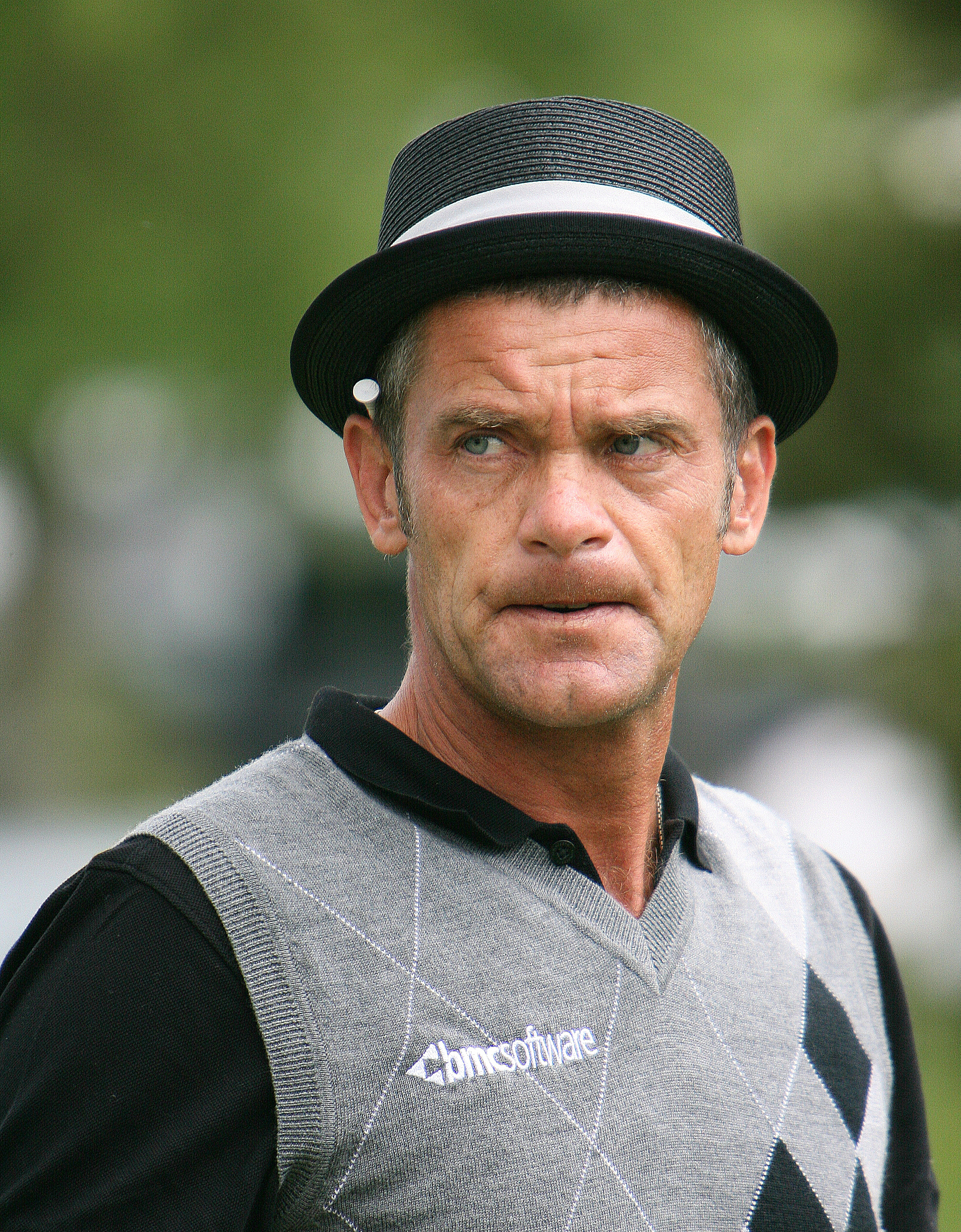
- Parnevik in April 2007

Personal information
- Full name: Jesper Bo Parnevik
- Nickname: Spaceman
- Nationality: Sweden
- Born: 7 March 1965 (age 61) Botkyrka, Sweden
- Height: 1.83 m (6 ft 0 in)
- Spouse: Mia Parnevik
- Children: 4, including Peg

Career
- Sport: Golf
- College: Palm Beach Junior College
- Turned professional: 1986
- Current tour: PGA Tour Champions
- Former tours: PGA Tour; European Tour
- Professional wins: 15
- Highest ranking: 7 (14 May 2000)

Number of wins by tour
- PGA Tour: 5
- European Tour: 4
- Challenge Tour: 1
- PGA Tour Champions: 1
- Other: 4

Best results in major championships
- Masters Tournament: T20: 2001
- PGA Championship: T5: 1996
- U.S. Open: T14: 1998
- The Open Championship: 2nd/T2: 1994, 1997

Achievements and awards
- Swedish Golf Tour Order of Merit winner: 1988
- Swedish Golfer of the Year: 1999

Jesper Bo Parnevik (Swedish pronunciation: [ˈjɛ̌sːpɛr ˈpɑ̂ːɳɛˌviːk]; born 7 March 1965) is a Swedish professional golfer. He spent 38 weeks in the top 10 of the Official World Golf Ranking in 2000 and 2001.

== Early life ==
Parnevik was born in Botkyrka, Stockholm County, and is the son of Swedish entertainer Bosse Parnevik and his wife Gertie (b. 1940). He grew up in Åkersberga.

Parnevik became a member of the first group of students in Sweden to combine studying with golf training at the Swedish upper secondary sports school in Danderyd outside Stockholm. At age 15, Parnevik spent 10 days in Myrtle Beach, South Carolina, and developed an appreciation for life in the United States; he later moved to Palm Beach County, Florida, to attend Palm Beach Junior College in Lake Worth on a golf scholarship.

== Amateur career ==
Parnevik was a member of the team representing Sweden at the 1984 and 1986 Eisenhower Trophy. He was also part of the Swedish team finishing second, after losing in the final against Scotland, at the 1985 European Amateur Team Championship on home soil in Halmstad, Sweden, where Parnevik won individually at the initial qualifying stroke-play competition.

== Professional career ==
In 1986, Parnevik turned professional. After winning the Swedish Golf Tour Order of Merit in 1988, including a runner-up finish to Vijay Singh at the 1988 Swedish PGA Championship, he scored four wins on the European Tour. His breakthrough came when he out-dueled Payne Stewart at the 1993 Scottish Open at Gleneagles King's Course.

With victories in 1995 and 1998, Parnevik became the first Swede to win twice on the European Tour on home soil. At his first victory at the Scandinavian Masters in 1995 at Barsebäck Golf & Country Club, he played 72 holes competition and 18 holes pro-am without a bogey, but with one double-bogey.

=== PGA Tour ===
Based in Florida, he joined the PGA Tour in the mid-90s, subsequently winning five events. His playing career also includes three Ryder Cup appearances (1997, 1999, and 2002) and two runner-up finishes in The Open (1994 and 1997). His career best world ranking of seventh, which he attained on 14 May 2000, was the highest world ranking achieved by a Swedish golfer until Henrik Stenson reached the top five in February 2007.

In late 2000, Parnevik underwent hip surgery at the persuasion of Greg Norman, who had undergone similar surgery.

Parnevik finished second in the Valero Texas Open in October 2007, losing to Justin Leonard in a playoff. In 2009, after a tie for 17th at the SAS Masters in Sweden, Parnevik underwent further hip surgery in Vail, Colorado, United States, which cut short his 2009 season on the PGA Tour. He also cited the hip injury as the reason for his withdrawal from the PGA Tour Qualifying Tournament ("Q-School") in December 2009.

In 2010, Parnevik missed cuts in his first three tournaments and had to withdraw again after a first round 68 at the Northern Trust Open because of an ailing back. He had emergency surgery where it was discovered that he had a broken lumbar vertebrae that could put his career in jeopardy.

Parnevik played the 2011 PGA Tour season on a fully exempt status for his Top 50 All-Time Earnings ranking. He was allowed to reuse this one-time exemption after being able to play only five tournaments in 2010. He played the 2012 and 2013 seasons on a Medical Extension after suffering a severe injury to his right hand in a boating accident. Despite his limited play, Parnevik made news in 2013 after bogeying the 18th hole at the RBC Heritage, which allowed a record-tying 91 players to make the 36 hole cut.

Plagued by injuries for years, Parnevik staged a comeback on the Champions Tour when he became eligible in 2015. He started 2016 with a tie for third at the Chubb Classic, losing out to former world number one golfers Bernhard Langer and Fred Couples. He got his first win on the Champions Tour in the same year at the Insperity Invitational.

=== Style ===
Parnevik is known for his distinctive and eccentric taste in clothes and fashion as well as his playing achievements, a fashion sense that led golf writer Dan Jenkins to describe him as "the last guy to climb out of the clown car at the circus". His on-course trademark was the upturned bill on his baseball cap. While on the European Ryder Cup team, he received a customized team cap with the Ryder Cup logo on the bottom of the bill instead of the front, so that it could be seen with the bill turned up. He has since stopped wearing the flipped-bill hat, opting for strawhats and visors but retains a flamboyant sense of fashion, such as disco-style purple trousers and other golf apparel designed by Johan Lindeberg. He has been politely described as "eclectic", and has been known to change outfits at the halfway stage of a round of tournament golf. Beginning in 2006, one of his new on-course fashion statements was a necktie worn under a vest. Puma Golf signed Jesper Parnevik in 2014 and he gets credited for his influence on their LUX Golf Appearel Line. Since wearing Puma Clothes he once again wears a custom made and more modern looking flipped bill hat. He is also known to eat volcanic dust as a dietary supplement. Parnevik's nickname on tour is "Spaceman".

== Awards and honors ==
- In 1998, Parnevik was awarded honorary member of the PGA of Sweden.
- He was awarded the 1999 Swedish Golfer of the Year.
- In 2003, the three Swedish teammates of the victorious European Ryder Cup team the previous year, Niclas Fasth, Pierre Fulke and Parnevik, was each, by the Swedish Golf Federation, awarded the Golden Club, the highest award for contributions to Swedish golf, as the 30th, 31st and 32nd recipients.
- In 2023, he was inducted into the Swedish Golf Hall of Fame.

== Personal life ==
Parnevik has a waterfront home in Tequesta, Florida. He is married to Mia Parnevik (née Sandsten 1968), and they have three daughters and one son. His oldest daughter Peg Parnevik has a career as a pop singer. Another daughter, Penny, is married to former NHL ice hockey player Douglas Murray. His son Phoenix is named after Parnevik's first PGA Tour win at the 1998 Phoenix Open.

Parnevik is credited with having introduced fellow professional golfer Tiger Woods to Swedish au pair Elin Nordegren (previously employed by Parnevik), whom Woods eventually married. Parnevik subsequently stated in 2009 that he regretted his responsibility for this introduction after reports of Woods' infidelity surfaced that year.

== In popular culture ==
- Parnevik made a cameo in the 2007 comedy, Who's Your Caddy, in which he plays himself.
- Parnevik and his family starred in a reality TV show, Parneviks, which aired on TV3 in Sweden for four seasons from 2015 to 2018, giving insights into his life in Florida.

== Amateur wins ==
- 1985 Swedish Junior Stroke-play Championship

== Professional wins (15) ==
=== PGA Tour wins (5) ===
No.	Date	Tournament	Winning score	Margin of victory	Runner(s)-up
1	18 Jan 1998	Phoenix Open	−15 (68-68-66-67=269)	3 strokes	(United States) Tommy Armour III, (United States) Brent Geiberger, (United States) Steve Pate, (United States) Tom Watson
2	25 Apr 1999	Greater Greensboro Chrysler Classic	−23 (65-63-67-70=265)	2 strokes	(United States) Jim Furyk
3	23 Jan 2000	Bob Hope Chrysler Classic	−27 (69-67-66-64-65=331)	1 stroke	(South Africa) Rory Sabbatini
4	14 May 2000	GTE Byron Nelson Classic	−11 (70-65-68-66=269)	Playoff	(United States) Davis Love III, (United States) Phil Mickelson
5	11 Mar 2001	Honda Classic	−18 (65-67-66-72=270)	1 stroke	(United States) Mark Calcavecchia, (Australia) Geoff Ogilvy, (New Zealand) Craig Perks

PGA Tour playoff record (1–1)

No.	Year	Tournament	Opponent(s)	Result
1	2000	GTE Byron Nelson Classic	(United States) Davis Love III, (United States) Phil Mickelson	Won with par on third extra hole Mickelson eliminated by birdie on second hole
2	2007	Valero Texas Open	(United States) Justin Leonard	Lost to birdie on third extra hole

=== European Tour wins (4) ===
No.	Date	Tournament	Winning score	Margin of victory	Runner-up
1	10 Jul 1993	Bell's Scottish Open	−9 (64-66-70-71=271)	5 strokes	(United States) Payne Stewart
2	6 Aug 1995	Volvo Scandinavian Masters	−18 (67-67-69-67=270)	5 strokes	(Scotland) Colin Montgomerie
3	15 Sep 1996	Trophée Lancôme	−12 (66-69-66-67=268)	5 strokes	(Scotland) Colin Montgomerie
4	2 Aug 1998	Volvo Scandinavian Masters (2)	−11 (67-65-71-70=273)	3 strokes	(Northern Ireland) Darren Clarke

European Tour playoff record (0–1)

No.	Year	Tournament	Opponent	Result
1	1992	Turespaña Open de Baleares	(Spain) Seve Ballesteros	Lost to birdie on sixth extra hole

=== Challenge Tour wins (1) ===
No.	Date	Tournament	Winning score	Margin of victory	Runner-up
1	16 Sep 1990	SI Compaq Open	−9 (69-68-71-67=275)	3 strokes	(Sweden) John Lindberg

=== Swedish Golf Tour wins (2) ===
No.	Date	Tournament	Winning score	Margin of victory	Runner-up
1	29 May 1988	Ramlösa Open	−9 (66-72-68-73=279)	5 strokes	(Australia) Terry Price
2	26 Jun 1988	Odense Open	−18 (69-66-63=198)	9 strokes	(Sweden) Thomas Nilsson

=== Other wins (2) ===
- 1988 Open Passing Shot (France)
- 1997 Johnnie Walker Super Tour

=== PGA Tour Champions wins (1) ===
No.	Date	Tournament	Winning score	Margin of victory	Runners-up
1	8 May 2016	Insperity Invitational	−12 (69-68-67=204)	4 strokes	(South Africa) David Frost, (United States) Mike Goodes, (United States) Jeff Maggert

== Results in major championships ==
Tournament	1993	1994	1995	1996	1997	1998	1999
Masters Tournament					T21	T31	CUT
U.S. Open					T48	T14	T17
The Open Championship	T21	2	T24	T45	T2	T4	T10
PGA Championship		CUT	T20	T5	T45	CUT	T10

Tournament	2000	2001	2002	2003	2004	2005	2006	2007	2008
Masters Tournament	T40	T20	T29			CUT			
U.S. Open	CUT	T30	T54	CUT					T74
The Open Championship	T36	T9	T28	DQ					
PGA Championship	T51	T13	CUT	T34	CUT	T28	CUT		

Top 10
Did not play

CUT = missed the half-way cut
DQ = Disqualified
"T" = tied

=== Summary ===
Tournament	Wins	2nd	3rd	Top-5	Top-10	Top-25	Events	Cuts made
Masters Tournament	0	0	0	0	0	2	7	5
U.S. Open	0	0	0	0	0	2	8	6
The Open Championship	0	2	0	3	5	7	11	11
PGA Championship	0	0	0	1	2	4	13	8
Totals	0	2	0	4	7	15	39	30

- Most consecutive cuts made – 11 (1995 Open Championship – 1998 Open Championship)
- Longest streak of top-10s – 2 (1999 Open Championship – 1999 PGA)

== Results in The Players Championship ==
Tournament	1995	1996	1997	1998	1999	2000	2001	2002	2003	2004	2005	2006	2007	2008
The Players Championship	T49	T53	CUT	T25	T23	CUT	CUT	CUT	T48	T33	T46	T38	CUT	T69

CUT = missed the halfway cut
"T" indicates a tie for a place

== Results in World Golf Championships ==
Tournament	1999	2000	2001	2002	2003	2004
Match Play	R64	R16		R64		
Championship		WD	NT^{1}			
Invitational	T27			T71	T71	T22

^{1}Cancelled due to 9/11

Top 10
Did not play

QF, R16, R32, R64 = Round in which player lost in match play
"T" = Tied
WD = Withdrew
NT = No tournament

== Results in senior major championships ==
Tournament	2015	2016	2017	2018	2019	2020	2021	2022	2023	2024
The Tradition	T47	51	T47	T56	DQ	NT				T63
Senior PGA Championship	T34	CUT	T21	T19	T12	NT		CUT		CUT
U.S. Senior Open		T58	T18	CUT		NT				
Senior Players Championship	T17	T13	T54	T20		T33		T66		
Senior British Open Championship	T51	T18		T18		NT				

Did not play

"T" indicates a tie for a place
CUT = missed the halfway cut
DQ = disqualified
NT = no tournament due to COVID-19 pandemic

== Team appearances ==
Amateur

- European Boys' Team Championship (representing Sweden): 1982
- Jacques Léglise Trophy (representing the Continent of Europe): 1982
- European Youths' Team Championship (representing Sweden): 1984
- Eisenhower Trophy (representing Sweden): 1984, 1986
- European Amateur Team Championship (representing Sweden): 1985
- St Andrews Trophy (representing the Continent of Europe): 1986

Professional

- Europcar Cup (representing Sweden): 1988 (winners)
- Dunhill Cup (representing Sweden): 1993, 1994, 1995, 1997
- World Cup (representing Sweden): 1994, 1995
- Ryder Cup (representing Europe): 1997 (winners), 1999, 2002 (winners)

== See also ==
- 1993 PGA Tour Qualifying School graduates
