= Swedish Golf Tour =

Professional golf tour

- Current season, competition or edition: 2026 Swedish Golf Tour
- Formerly: MoreGolf Mastercard Tour; Nordea Tour; SAS Masters Tour; Telia Tour; Telia Infomedia Golf Tour; Scandinavian Tour
- Sport: Golf
- Founded: 1983
- Founder: PGA of Sweden; Swedish Golf Fereration
- First season: 1984
- Countries: Based in Sweden (Note: Schedules have also included events in Denmark, Estonia, Finland, Germany, Latvia, Lithuania, Norway, Russia, Spain and Thailand.)
- Most titles: Order of Merit titles: (Sweden) Per-Arne Brostedt (2) (Sweden) Mats Hallberg (2); Tournament wins: (Sweden) Mats Lanner (11) (Note: Includes four tournaments which were incorporated into Challenge Tour schedules.)
- Related competitions: Danish Golf Tour; Finnish Tour; Nordic Golf League; Norwegian Golf Tour
- Website: https://golf.se/moregolfmastercardtour

The Swedish Golf Tour, currently titled as the Cutter & Buck Tour for sponsorship reasons, is a developmental professional golf which was formerly operated by Svenska Golftourerna AB, as well as being owned equally by the Swedish Golf Federation and the PGA of Sweden. Since 2018 it has been operated by the Swedish Golf Federation.

The tour is designed to help Swedish golfers to reach the standard of play needed to qualify for the European Tour or the Challenge Tour.

The events on the SGT are included in the Nordic Golf League, which is one of four European Tour-recognised third-tier tours, and is run in collaboration by the national golf associations of Denmark, Finland, Norway, and Sweden. The four third-level tours carry Official World Golf Ranking points.

Each year, usually in October, a 2-stage qualifying school tournament is held, which gives players an opportunity to qualify for the SGT.

The developing tour to the SGT is the Future Series, with a minimum prize fund of SKr 50,000 per tournament 2020. The Future Series Ranking, gives players the opportunity to qualify for the SGT.

The Swedish Golf Tour for women was established in 1986 and is run by the same organization.

== History ==
The history of the men's Swedish Golf Tour is closely linked to the history of professional golf in Sweden. Until the late 1960s, the main, and usually only, professional tournament in Sweden was the Dunlop Cup, played 1932–1968. From 1958, the Penfold Cup was added as a yearly professional tournament in Sweden. In 1969, a conflict between the Swedish Golf Federation and the PGA of Sweden, resulted in that no professional tournaments were sanctioned by the federation to take place in the country.

Starting in 1970, the Dunlop Cup was transformed to the official Swedish PGA Championship, which became the most important tournament on a small but soon growing professional circuit in Sweden. At this time, the majority of the club professionals in Sweden were British and none of the Swedish PGA members were tournament professionals. A point system at the few existing tournaments decided the yearly selection of the two best professionals, who were Swedish citizens, to represent Sweden at the World Cup, usually played far away in the world and long after the Swedish golf season was concluded. Understandably, the Swedish teams usually had difficulties to be competitive.

The first Swedish tournament professionals appeared in the early 1970s, with Jan Rosell as the very first in 1971, soon followed by Bengt Malmqvist and Gunnar Mueller. From 1977, only tournament professionals have represented Sweden in the World Cup.

In 1970, the first international world class 72-hole golf tournament in Sweden took place, the invitational tournament Volvo Open, with Jack Nicklaus and Lanny Wadkins in the field, at Delsjö Golf Club and Royal Drottningholm Golf Club.

In 1972, Flygt Open at Viksjö Golf Club and in 1973, Eskilstuna Open was added to the domestic pro circuit schedule.

In July 1973, the first European Tour tournament held in Sweden, the Scandinavian Enterprise Open, took place at Royal Drottningholm Golf Club outside Stockholm. Swedish elite players, amateurs as well as professionals, had the opportunity to try to qualify and a few of them were invited directly to the main tournament. Abdel Halim, Egypt, and John Cockin, England, both working as club professionals in Sweden for many years, shared 24th and 36th place respectively. Cockin shared his place with world stars Kel Nagle and Doug Sanders.

In 1978, Gunnar Mueller became the first Swedish born professional to qualify for the last round at the Scandinavian Enterprise Open. Six Swedish amateurs had achieved that before him.

At the annual meeting of the Swedish Golf Federation in March 1983, "open golf" was introduced, which meant that, from next year both amateurs and professionals were allowed to enter all domestic competitions, the PGA Championship and international amateur tournaments excluded (amateurs later allowed at the PGA Championship). Non-PGA members with a licence, as well as PGA members, were allowed to receive prize money. The new and internationally unique rules, made it possible to transform the traditionally most important amateur tournaments in the country to professional tournaments, attractive to sponsors and made it possible for many top amateurs to turn professional.

The Swedish Golf Tour, SGT, was founded in November 1983, to begin in May 1984, and was organized by the PGA of Sweden and the Swedish Golf Federation (SGF) together. Two tournament directors, one from each organization, were appointed to switch responsibility between them for the tournaments, Christer Lindberg from the PGA and Göran Henriks from the SGF. The main sponsor was Kullenberg Fastighets AB

The same year, when tournament professionals already had been dominating the Swedish PGA Championship and the other domestic professional tournaments for several years, a Swedish Club pro PGA Championship, limited to instructing professionals in Sweden and not included in the SGT, was established.

The first year, 1984, the SGT consisted of seven tournaments with a total prize amount of SKr 1.3 million and winners' share between SKr 25,000 and SKr 50,000 for each tournament. Except that, the European Tour tournament in Sweden, the 1984 Scandinavian Enterprise Open (SEO), with a prize fund of SKr 1.5 million, was included in the SGT.

As the best Swedish players were expected to mainly compete abroad, two Order of Merit standings were counted, one with total money won by SGT-members, with other main tours included, and one with only SGT tournaments counted. One of the purposes with two rankings was to select players to represent Sweden at the World Cup. The first Order of Merit (Total) was won by Anders Forsbrand and the first Order of Merit (SGT) was won by Mats Lanner, who won the final tournament Kullenberg Playoff at Björn Borg Sports Club, Lindö, Stockholm.

The year after, the tour grew to nine tournaments, of which one had a first prize of SKr 100,000. Beyond that, the 1985 SEO was included in the SGT. The 1985 Order of Merit (Total) was won by Ove Sellberg and the Order of Merit (SGT) was won by Per-Arne Brostedt.

In 1988, a company, Svenska Golftourerna AB, was founded, owned equally by the PGA of Sweden and the Swedish Golf Federation, to organize the two Swedish Golf Tours for men and women. Its first chairperson was Ola Öqvist.

During 1987–1998, tournaments in other Nordic countries were included in the tour. From 1990 to 1994, all SGT tournaments were co-sanctioned by the Challenge Tour.

In 1994, a qualifying school tournament for the SGT was established, the first year held in the spring, with 312 players entering, and a second stage in June. The Q school was later moved to the autumn.

Until 1996, the SGT Order of Merit standings was decided by money won and since 1997 a point system has been in force.

In 1999, the Nordic Golf League (NGL) was established and came to include the SGT, as well as the national golf tour of Denmark and tournaments in Finland and Norway.

As the European Tour and the Challenge Tour have become stronger and richer, players have usually stayed to the tour on the highest level they have been qualified for, why the SGT Order of Merit (total) have lost its significance in favor of the NGL Order of Merit. The top five players on the NGL rankings list at the end of each season earn a place on the second tier Challenge Tour for the following year. Since July 2015, the NGL carry Official World Golf Ranking points.

Since 2018 the Swedish Golf Federation drives the tour in its own organization.

In 2020, the men's Swedish Golf Tour initially included 16 scheduled tournaments, held in four countries, beginning in February and ending in October. Due to the COVID-19 pandemic, the 2020 schedule was subject to change. The Swedish Golf Federation and the PGA of Sweden decided on June 2, of a restart of the 2020 tour on July 2–4 with Katrineholm Open hosted by Robert Karlsson at Katrineholm Golf Club. Only two scheduled tournaments in Spain in February took place before a three months break.

=== Sponsorships ===
The Swedish Golf Tour has been titled as the Scandinavian Golf Tour (1993–1995), the Telia Infomedia Golf Tour (1996–1997), the Telia Tour (1998–2008), the SAS Masters Tour (2008–2009), the Nordea Tour (2010–2016), the Swedish Golf Tour (2017–2019) and the MoreGolf Mastercard Tour (2020–2023).

In July 2023, it was announced that the tour had signed a title sponsorship agreement with Cutter & Buck, being renamed as the Cutter & Buck Tour from 2024.

== Order of Merit winners ==
Year	Winner	Points
2026	(Sweden) David Nyfjäll	335,466
2025	(Sweden) Adam Wallin	607,936
2024	(Sweden) Albin Bergström	398,875
2023	(Sweden) Björn Åkesson	349,913
2022	(Denmark) John Axelsen	362,675
2021	(Sweden) Adam Blommé	217,371
2020	(Sweden) Mikael Lindberg	434,903
2019	(Sweden) Christopher Sahlström	339,258
2018	(Sweden) Jacob Glennemo	269,908
2017	(Iceland) Axel Bóasson	337,934
2016	(Denmark) Mark Haastrup	467,164
2015	(Sweden) Björn Hellgren	354,069
2014	(Sweden) Jesper Billing	423,377
2013	(Sweden) Jesper Kennegård	290,476
2012	(Sweden) Johan Carlsson	251,361
2011	(Sweden) Jens Dantorp	316,840
2010	(Sweden) Wilhelm Schauman	276,330
2009	(Sweden) Joakim Rask	210,062
2008	(Sweden) Petter Bocian	200,684
2007	(Sweden) Rikard Karlberg	1,530
2006	(Sweden) Fredrik Hammarberg	1,491
2005	(Sweden) Fredrik Söderström	1,501
2004	(Sweden) Magnus A. Carlsson	1,605
2003	(Sweden) Leif Westerberg	1,035
2002	(Sweden) Joakim Kristiansson	1,759
2001	(Sweden) Marcus Norgren	879
2000	(Sweden) Hampus von Post	1,450
1999	(Sweden) Björn Pettersson	1,612
1998	(Sweden) Fredrik Larsson	968
1997	(Sweden) Fredrik Henge	2,021
1996	(Sweden) Adam Mednick	2,325
Year	Winner	Prize money (SKr)
1995	(England) Stephen Field	143,499
1994	(Sweden) Mats Hallberg (2)	180,002
1993	(Sweden) Niclas Fasth	184,365
1992	(Sweden) Joakim Haeggman	132,280
1991	(Sweden) Mats Hallberg	208,391
1990	(Sweden) Mikael Högberg	221,700
1989	(Sweden) Magnus Sunesson	245,250
1988	(Sweden) Jesper Parnevik	243,100
1987	(Sweden) Johan Ryström	233,300
1986	(Sweden) Per-Arne Brostedt (2)	210,050
1985	(Sweden) Per-Arne Brostedt	147,775
1984	(Sweden) Mats Lanner	158,925

== See also ==
- Danish Golf Tour
- Finnish Tour
- Nordic Golf League
- Norwegian Golf Tour
- Swedish Golf Tour (women)
