= Fylleån =

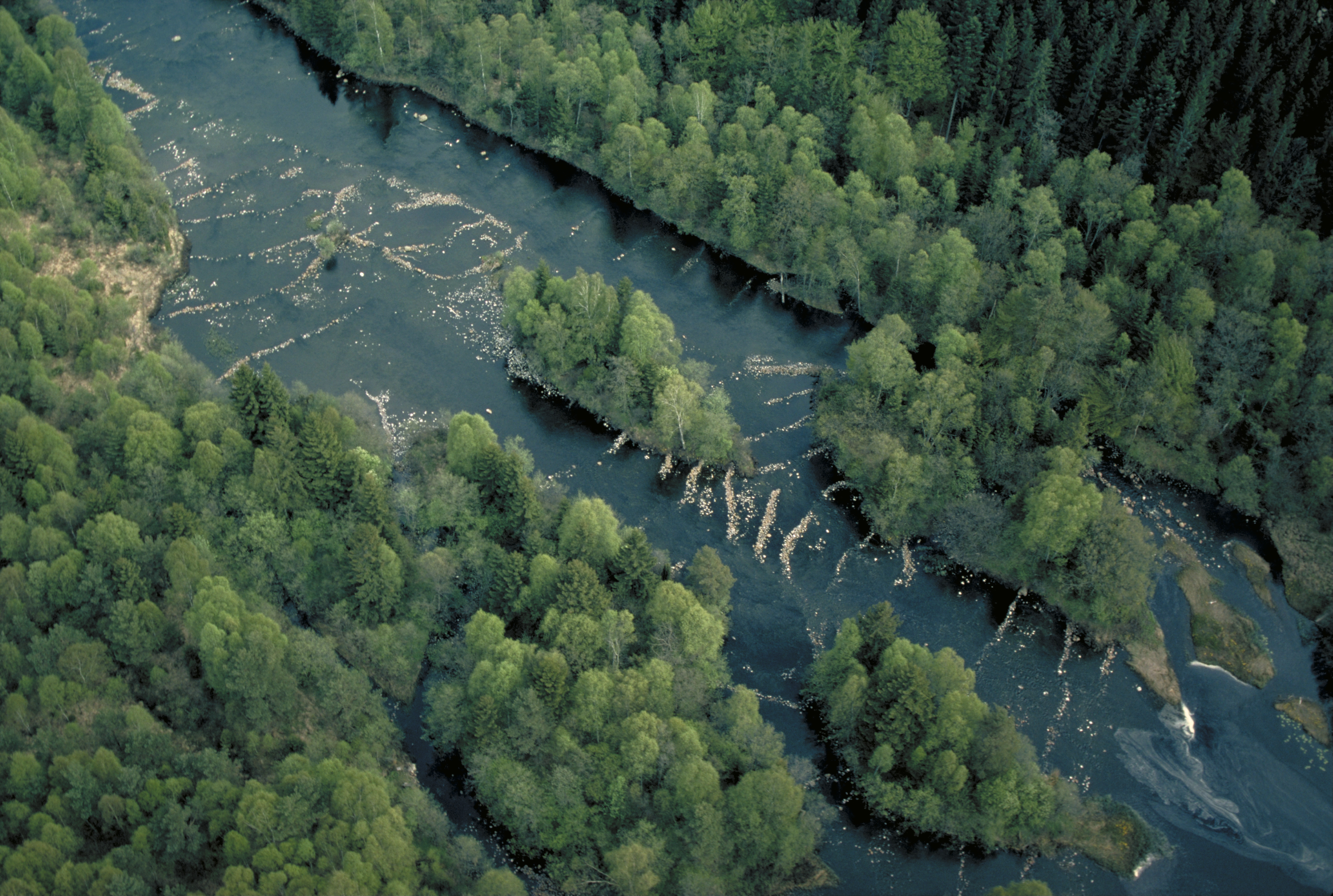

Location
- Country: Sweden
- County: Kronoberg, Halland

Physical characteristics
- Mouth: Kattegat
  - coordinates: 56°37′15″N 12°54′25″E
  - elevation: 0 m (0 ft)
- Length: 60 km (37 mi)
- Basin size: 393.8 km^{2} (152.0 sq mi)

Basin features
- Designation

Ramsar Wetland
- Designated: 14 November 2001
- Reference no.: 1119

Fylleån is a river in Sweden.

The length of Fylleån is about 60 km. It flows up west of Hunsberget (232 m above sea level) in Ljungby and flows northwest towards lake Femmen (148 m above sea level) in Hylte Municipality. From Femmen, the journey goes steadily southwest, past Kullhult, Bygget and Fröböke.

Then Fylleån turns first into Gyltigesjön and Töddesjön and then into the long narrow lake Simlången (65 m above sea level) in Simlångsdalen. Simlångsdalen is a narrow valley crevice with rich vegetation and the settlement in this valley. Lake Simlången turns into Brearedssjön from which Fylleån flows out and bends more and more to the west and finally flows intolerant Laholmsbukten at Fyllinge a few kilometers south of Halmstad and the Nissan mouth.

There are several nature reserves along the river. In Halmstad Municipality there are Hagön, Brogård and Årnarp and at Simlången there are Veka (northern), Veka (southern) as well as Bröda. Furthermore, in Halmstad municipality there are the nature reserves Gårdshult and Danska adjacent to the river Ässman (or Assman), which flows into Brearedssjön, and thus forms a tributary to Fylleån River.
