= 1985 European Amateur Team Championship =

Golf competition

Tournament information
- Dates: 26–30 June 1985
- Location: Halmstad, Sweden; 56.662264°N 12.749291°E
- Courses: Halmstad Golf Club, (North Course)
- Organized by: European Golf Association
- Format: Qualification round: 36 holes stroke play Knock-out match-play

Statistics
- Par: 72
- Length: 6,540 yards (5,980 m)
- Field: 19 teams 108 players

Champion
- Scotland; Cecil Bloice, Ian Brotherston, George MacGregor, Angus Moir, Colin Montgomerie, Sandy Stephen
- Qualification round: 760 (+40); Final match: 4 1/2–2 1/2

Location map
- Location in Europe Location in Sweden Location in Halland County

The 1985 European Amateur Team Championship took place from 26 to 30 June at Halmstad Golf Club, in Tylösand, Sweden. It was the 14th men's golf European Amateur Team Championship.

== Venue ==
The tournament was played at the club's North course. The club was founded in 1930. Its first 18-hole course, located in Tylösand, Halmstad Municipality, 9 kilometers west of Halmstad city center in Halland County, Sweden, was constructed by Rafael Sundblom and approved in 1938. A new course was inaugurated in 1967. Together with the last nine holes of the old course, this formed the new course, called the North Course.

== Format ==
Each team consisted of six players, playing two rounds of an opening stroke-play qualifying competition over two days, counting the five best scores each day for each team.

The eight best teams formed flight A, in knock-out match-play over the next three days. The teams were seeded based on their positions after the stroke play. The first placed team were drawn to play the quarter-final against the eight placed team, the second against the seventh, the third against the sixth and the fourth against the fifth. Teams were allowed to use six players during the team matches, selecting four of them in the two morning foursome games and five players in to the afternoon single games. Games all square at the 18th hole were declared halved, if the team match was already decided.

The seven teams placed 9–15 in the qualification stroke-play formed flight B and the four teams placed 16–19 formed flight C, to play similar knock-out play to decide their final positions.

== Teams ==
19 nation teams contested the event. Each team consisted of five or six players.

Players in the leading teams

Country	Players
Austria	Andreas Brier, Christian Czerny, Martin Kerscher, Max Lamberg, Matthias Nemes, Klaus Nierlich
Belgium	Olivier Buysse, Alain Eaton, Thierry Goosens, Michel Moerman, Ivan Nyssen, Freddy Rodesch
Czechoslovakia	Jiri Dvorac, Jan Juhaniak, Jan Kunsta, Jiri Kunsta, Miroslav Nemec, Jiri Zavazal
Denmark	Ole Eskildsen, Rolf Nissen, Leif Nyholm, Jan Frej Petersen, Jacob Rasmussen, Anders Sørensen
England	Peter Baker, David Gilford, John Hawksworth, Graham Homewood, Craig Lawrence, Peter McEvoy
Finland	Johan Hirn, Tapio Jalo, Markku Louhio, Sauli Mäkiluoma, Juha Selin, Erkki Välimää
France	Alexis Godillot, François Illouz, Laurent Lasalle, Marc Pendariès, Philippe Ploujoux, Jean-François Remésy
Greece	George Arasonis, George Nikitaidis, Craigen Pappas, Sean Pappas, Stefan Vafiiadis, Chris Valasakis
Iceland	Hannes Eyvindsson, Ulfar Jonsson, Ragnar Olafsson, Sigurdur Petursson, Sigurdur Sigurdsson, Björgvin Thorsteinsson
Ireland	Neil Anderson, Jim Feeney, Mark Gannon, Garth McGimpsey, Liam McNamara, Arthur Pierse
Italy	Alberto Binaghi, Marco Durante, Guido Grappasoni, Giorgio Merlitti, Enrico Nistri, Sergio Prati
Netherlands	Ruud Bos, Carel Braun, Bart Nolte, Daan Slooter, Piet-Hein Streutgers, Siemon Vegter
Norway	Erik Dønnestad, Tom Fredriksen, Per Haugsrud, Gard Midtvåge, Tore Christian Sviland, Lars-Erik Underthun
Scotland	Cecil Bloice, Ian Brotherston, George Macgregor, Angus Moir, Colin Montgomerie, Sandy Stephen
Spain	Ignacio Gervás, Luis Gabarda, Dionisio Garcia, José María Olazábal, Borja Queipo de Llano, Eduardo de la Riva
Sweden	Magnus Hennberg, John Lindberg, Jesper Parnevik, Johan Ryström, Carl-Magnus Strömberg, Johan Tumba
Switzerland	Marcus Gottstein, Thomasa Gottstein, Carlo Rampone, Dominique Rey, Johhny Storjohann, Erwin Vonlanthen
Wales	John Jones, Stephen Jones, Michael Macara, Paul Mayo, Richard Morris, Neil Roderick
West Germany	Thomas Hübner, Rainer Mund, Hans-Günther Reiter, Christoph Städler, Andreas Stamm, Ralf Thielemann

== Winners ==
Host country Sweden won the opening 36-hole competition, with a score of 14 over par 734.

Individual leaders were Jesper Parnevik, Sweden and Erkki Välimää, Finland, each of them with a score of 2-under-par 142, two strokes ahead of Peter McEvoy, England.

Team Scotland won the gold medal, earning their third title, beating Sweden in the final 4.5–2.5. Team Spain earned the bronze on third place, after beating England 4.5–2.5 in the bronze match.

José María Olazábal, Spain, made a hole-in-one on the 13th hole, during his 3 and 2 single match win over Colin Montgomerie in the semi-final between Spain and Scotland.

== Results ==
Qualification round

Team standings

Place	Country	Score	To par
1	Sweden	368-366=734	+14
2	Denmark	372-370=742	+22
3	Spain	376-371=747	+27
T4	Ireland *	377-376=753	+33
T4	England	378-375=753	+33
6	France	383-373=756	+36
7	Scotland	375-385=760	+40
8	West Germany	384-381=765	+45
9	Finland	381-386=767	+47
10	Norway	388-380=768	+48
11	Wales	378-392=770	+50
12	Italy	393-379=772	+52
13	Netherlands	383-393=776	+56
14	Greece	389-391=780	+60
15	Switzerland	404-380=784	+64
16	Austria	387-402=789	+69
17	Iceland	398-396=794	+74
18	Belgium	402-399=801	+81
19	Czechoslovakia	418-406=824	+104

* Note: In the event of a tie the order was determined by the best total of the two non-counting scores of the two rounds.

Individual leaders

Place	Player	Country	Score	To par
T1	Jesper Parnevik	Sweden	72-70=142	−2
T1	Erkki Välimää	Finland	67-75=142	−2
3	Peter McEvoy	England	71-73=144	E
4	Colin Montgomerie	Scotland	72-73=145	+1
T5	Alexis Godillot	France	73-73=146	+2
T5	Paul Mayo	Wales	72-74=146	+2
T5	Jacob Rasmusson	Denmark	71-75=146	+2
T8	Johan Ryström	Sweden	75-72=147	+3
T8	Anders Sørensen	Denmark	72-75=147	+3

Note: There was no official award for the lowest individual scores.

Flight A

Bracket

Quarter finals
Scotland	4.5
Denmark	2.5
Spain	4
France	3
England	7
Ireland	0
Sweden	5.5
West Germany	1.5

Semi finals
Scotland	5.5
Spain	1.5
Sweden	5
England	2

Final
Scotland	4.5
Sweden	2.5
Bronze match
Spain	4.5
England	2.5

Elimination matches
Denmark	4.5
France	2.5
Ireland	5
West Germany	2

Match for 5th place
Denmark	4
Ireland	3
Match for 7th place
West Germany	4
France	3

Final games

Scotland	Sweden
4.5	2.5
C. Mongomerie / G. MagGregor	J. Lindberg / J. Parnevik 3 & 2
C. Bloice / S. Stephen 1 hole	J. Ryström / M. Hennberg
Colin Montgomerie AS *	Johan Ryström AS *
George MacGregor 1 hole	Jesper Parnevik
Ian Brotherston	John Lindberg 3 & 2
Cecil Bloice 4 & 3	Johan Tumba
Sandy Stephen 4 & 3	Carl-Magnus Strömberg

* Note: Game declared halved, since team match already decided.

Flight B

Bracket

Round 1
Norway	4
Switzerland	3
Wales	4
Greece	3
Italy	6
Netherlands	1

Round 2
Norway	4.5
Wales	2.5
Finland	4
Italy	3

Match for 9th place
Norway	5
Finland	2
Match for 11th place
Wales	4.5
Italy	2.5

Elimination match
Greece	5
Switzerland	2

Match for 13th place
Netherlands	5.5
Greece	1.5

Flight C

Bracket

Round 1
Belgium	5.5
Iceland	1.5
Austria	4
Czech Republic	3

Match for 16th place
Austria	5.5
Belgium	1.5
Match for 18th place
Czech Republic	4
Iceland	3

Final standings

Place	Country
1st place, gold medalist(s)	Scotland
2nd place, silver medalist(s)	Sweden
3rd place, bronze medalist(s)	Spain
4	England
5	Denmark
6	Ireland
7	West Germany
8	France
9	Norway
10	Finland
11	Wales
12	Italy
13	Netherlands
14	Greece
15	Switzerland
16	Austria
17	Belgium
18	Czechoslovakia
19	Iceland

== See also ==
- Eisenhower Trophy – biennial world amateur team golf championship for men organized by the International Golf Federation.
- European Ladies' Team Championship – European amateur team golf championship for women organised by the European Golf Association.
