= Niklas Gudmundsson =

Swedish footballer

Personal information
- Full name: Niklas Lars Roger Gudmundsson
- Date of birth: 29 February 1972 (age 54)
- Place of birth: Trönninge, Sweden
- Height: 1.80 m (5 ft 11 in)
- Positions: Midfielder; forward

Youth career
- Trönninge IF
- 1986–1988: Halmstads BK

Senior career*
Years	Team	Apps	(Gls)
1988–1996	Halmstads BK	158	(52)
1995–1996	→ Blackburn Rovers (loan)	4	(0)
1996–1997	Blackburn Rovers	2	(0)
1997	→ Ipswich Town (loan)	10	(3)
1997–2000	Malmö FF	72	(10)
2001–2002	IF Elfsborg	19	(2)
2003–2007	Ängelholms FF		
Total		265	(67)

International career
1987–1988	Sweden U16	21	(6)
1989–1991	Sweden U18	23	(15)
1990–1993	Sweden U21/O	28	(6)
1996	Sweden B	1	(0)
1991–1995	Sweden	7	(0)
- * Club domestic league appearances and goals

Niklas Lars Roger Gudmundsson (Swedish pronunciation: [ˈnɪkˌlas ˈɡʉːdˌmɵndˌsɔn]; born 29 February 1972) is a Swedish former professional footballer who played as a midfielder or forward. Starting off his career with Halmstads BK in the early 1980s, he went on to represent Blackburn Rovers, Ipswich Town, Malmö FF, and IF Elfsborg before retiring at Ängelholms FF in 2007. A full international between 1991 and 1995, he won seven caps for the Sweden national team. He represented the Sweden Olympic team at the 1992 Summer Olympics.

== Club career ==
=== Early career and Halmstads BK ===
Born in Trönninge, Gudmundsson started his youth career at hometown club Trönninge IF before joining the youth rankings of Halmstads BK in 1986. His first senior appearance came in the last round of the 1988 Swedish football Division 1 against IK Oddevold, also securing promotion to the Allsvenskan. He became a first team regular in 1990 and won the 1994–95 Svenska Cupen. Gudmundsson also had a trial at Norwich City, but was not signed.

During the 1995–96 UEFA Cup Winners' Cup, Gudmundsson scored twice in a 3–0 against Parma, only to see a 4–0 defeat in the away leg that knocked Halmstad out of the competition.

=== Blackburn Rovers ===
After finishing in the third place at the 1995 Allsvenskan, Gudmundsson moved to Premier League side Blackburn Rovers first on a loan until March 1996, when he was purchased for £1 million.

He made his debut for the 1994–95 FA Premier League champions in a 3–0 win against Sheffield Wednesday on 20 January 1996. He made a total of four appearances for the Rovers while on loan before getting injured and also had two appearances in the 1996–97 season, all of them coming from the bench.

==== Loan to Ipswich ====
In March 1997, Gudmundsson was loaned to Ipswich Town, scoring three goals in ten Football League First Division games. Although he impressed at the club, they were unable to afford his transfer fee and he returned to Blackburn Rovers.

=== Malmö FF ===
After returning to Blackburn, Gudmundsson was out of the plans of the new coach Roy Hodgson and was transferred to Malmö FF with the English club receiving Anders Andersson in the deal. He played at Malmö FF until the end of 2000 and was targeted by Norwegian club Bryne FK after being relegated in the 1999 Allsvenskan, but no deal was completed.

=== IF Elfsborg, Ängelholms FF, and retirement ===
In 2001, Gudmundsson moved to IF Elfsborg, winning the 2000–01 Svenska Cupen. He played only three league matches in 2002 due to a knee injury. In 2003, he signed for Ängelholms FF, playing for the club until 2007.

== International career ==
Gudmundsson played for all the national team ranks, amassing a total of 26 goals in 81 appearances combining youth, Olympic and senior matches.

=== Youth ===
Gudmundsson was part a member of the Sweden U20 squad at the 1991 FIFA World Youth Championship playing in the three matches at the tournament and part of the team that qualified to the 1992 UEFA European Under-21 Championship, playing four qualification matches plus both legs of the tournament final.

In 1992, he played at both legs of the 1992 UEFA European Under-21 Championship final.

Gudmundsson played in three of the four matches that Sweden played in the 1992 Olympic football tournament, all as a substitute. Although Sweden did not qualify to the 1994 edition, Gudmundsson scored five times during the qualification.

=== Senior ===
Gudmundsson made his debut for the senior Sweden national team in 1991 in a friendly match against Poland. He returned to the national team in 1995 for a UEFA Euro 1996 qualifying match against Hungary. He also appeared in the three Umbro Cup matches and friendlies against the United States and Scotland in the same year.

== Personal life ==
Niklas is the father of Leeds United player Gabriel Gudmundsson.

== Career statistics ==
=== International ===
Appearances and goals by national team and year
National team	Year	Apps	Goals
Sweden	1991	1	0
Sweden	1992	0	0
Sweden	1993	0	0
Sweden	1994	0	0
Sweden	1995	6	0
Total		7	0

== Honours ==
Halmstads BK

- Svenska Cupen: 1994–95

IF Elfsborg

- Svenska Cupen: 2000–01
