= Halmstad Golf Club =

Golf club in Tylösand, Sweden

Coordinates: 56.662264°N 12.749291°E

- Location in Sweden

Club information
- Location: Tylösand, Halmstad Municipality, Halland County, Sweden
- Established: 1935
- Type: Private
- Total holes: 36
- Tournaments: Solheim Cup; Chrysler Open; Skandia PGA Open
- Website: hgk.se

North Course
- Designed by: Rafael Sundblom; Nils Sköld
- Par: 72

South Course
- Designed by: Rafael Sundblom; Frank Pennink; Donald Steel
- Par: 72

Halmstad Golf Club (Halmstad Golfklubb; Halmstad GK) is a golf club located in Tylösand, Halmstad Municipality in Sweden. It has hosted the 2007 Solheim Cup and the Chrysler Open on the Ladies European Tour and most recently Scandinavian Mixed.

== History ==
The club was formed in 1930 and the first 18-hole course was approved by the Swedish Golf Federation in 1938, and it hosted its first Swedish Matchplay Championship in 1939. In 1967, 9 new holes were constructed, which together with the last 9 holes of the old course formed the new North Course. In 1975 the final 9 holes were built, forming the South Course together with the original first 9 holes.

Claiming a home among the towering pines and seaside lands of Sweden's golfing playground, the championship North Course is repeatedly ranked as one of the best golf courses in the country. The British journal Golf World has named the course the best in Sweden and the second best course in Europe outside of the United Kingdom.

The club hosted the 2007 Solheim Cup where the American team led by Betsy King prevailed over the Europeans led by Helen Alfredsson, with Morgan Pressel winning 2 & 1 against Annika Sörenstam on the final day. Laura Davies won the Chrysler Open here on the 1999 Ladies European Tour and in 1988 Vijay Singh won the Swedish PGA Championship by one stroke over Jesper Parnevik.

The club has also hosted many amateur tournaments such as the 1997 Vagliano Trophy and the 2011 European Amateur, or the St Andrews Trophy where Gaëtan Mourgue D'Algue and Michael Bonallack battled it out here in 1962. It saw Scotland win the European Amateur Team Championship in 1985 with Colin Montgomerie in the team.

== Tournaments hosted ==
=== European Tour and Ladies European Tour ===
- Scandinavian Mixed - 2022

=== Ladies European Tour ===
- Chrysler Open – 1999 · 2000

=== Challenge Tour ===
- Swedish PGA Championship – 1989 · 1990 · 1991 · 1992 · 2002

=== Amateur ===
- Swedish Matchplay Championship – 1939 · 1942 · 1945 · 1973
- St Andrews Trophy – 1962 · 1986
- European Ladies' Team Championship – 1969
- European Amateur Team Championship – 1985 · 2015
- Vagliano Trophy – 1997
- European Amateur – 2011
- Annika Invitational Europe – 2017

=== Other ===
- Shell's Wonderful World of Golf – 1963
- Swedish PGA Championship – 1982 · 1988
- Solheim Cup – 2007

== See also ==
- List of golf courses in Sweden
