= Åled =

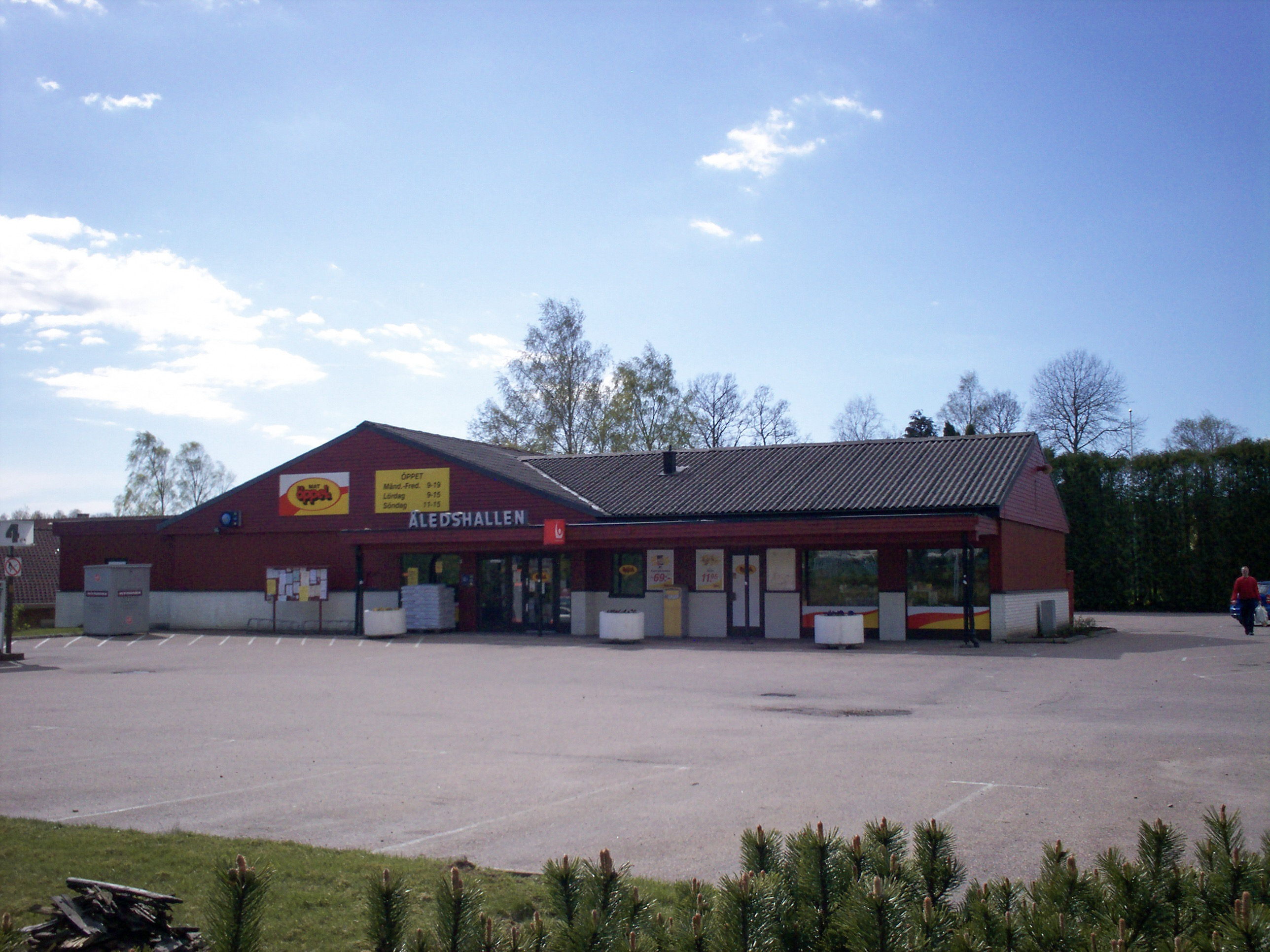
- Åledshallen, the grocery store in Åled

- Location within Halland Location within Sweden
- Coordinates: 56°44′39″N 12°56′40″E
- Country: Sweden
- Province: Halland
- County: Halland County
- Municipality: Halmstad Municipality

Area
  - Total: 1.94 km^{2} (0.75 sq mi)

Population (31 December 2020)
  - Total: 1,775
  - Density: 915/km^{2} (2,370/sq mi)
- Time zone: UTC+1 (CET)
  - Summer (DST): UTC+2 (CEST)

Åled is a locality situated in Halmstad Municipality, Halland County, Sweden, with 1,775 inhabitants as of 2020. The community is located just over 10 km northeast of Halmstad. The Nissan river runs through the area.

Spånstad is located in the northwestern part of the village, and Enslöv is in the east. Northeast of Åled there is a small lake named Torsjön and "Gröta håla" (a giant's kettle).

== History ==
The area around Åled has been built up for a longer time, with the church village of Enslöv being mentioned by name already in the 14th century. In the late 1800s the locality Åled formed as the newly constructed railway allowed industry to be built.

Enslöv has likely been home to a church since the later half of the 10th century, although the current church was built in 1835, as the older church was destroyed in a fire started by a lightning strike.

Åled was part of a separate municipality, Enslöv rural municipality, until its merger into Halmstad Municipality in 1974 as part of the Swedish municipal reforms during the early 1970s.

== Today ==
=== Communications ===
Åled is located along the Halmstad-Nässjö railway line, formerly part of Halmstad Nässjö Railways, HNJ. It was completed in 1882, but the station in Åled has been closed for decades, and the building is now owned and maintained by IOGT-NTO. Building a new railway station in Åled has been proposed by Halmstad Municipality.

Hallandstrafiken operate a bus service which runs from Oskarström to Halmstad through Åled, with frequent service during peak hours and hourly service on weekdays.

Åled lies just off national road 26, and not far from the E6/E20 motorways.

=== Amenities ===
Åled has a smaller grocery store operated under the Matöppet brand, which also serves as a post office. It is also home to a number of private employers, including LinSon and fiber optics manufacturer Micropol.

=== Education ===
Åled is home to a primary school, Åledsskolan (formerly Enslövsskolan until a renovation in 2014), as well as several kindergartens. The closest upper-stage school ('högstadium') is in Oskarström, with upper secondary schools located in Halmstad itself.

=== Residents ===
The musician Göran Fritzson from Gyllene Tider grew up in Åled.
