= Sennan =

Sennan may refer to:

- Sennan, Osaka, city near Osaka, Japan
- Sennan, Halmstad, locality in Halmstad Municipality, Sweden
