= Aled =

Aled (pronounced [ˈalɛd]) is a male Welsh given name meaning "child" and may refer to:

- Aled Brew (born 1986), Welsh rugby union player
- Aled Davies (born 1992), Welsh rugby union player
- Aled Edwards (born 1962), Canadian structural biologist
- Aled Haydn Jones (born 1976), Welsh radio producer
- Aled James (born 1982), rugby league player
- Aled Jones (born 1970), Welsh singer and broadcaster
- Aled Owen Roberts (1889–1949), Welsh politician, soldier and businessman
- Aled Thomas (born 1985), Welsh rugby union player
- Aled Wyn Davies (born 1974), classical tenor from Wales
- Tudur Aled (1465–1525), late medieval Welsh poet

== See also ==
- Åled, an urban area in Sweden
