= Steninge =

- Location within Halland Location within Sweden
- Coordinates: 56°47′N 12°40′E
- Country: Sweden
- Province: Halland
- County: Halland County
- Municipality: Halmstad Municipality

Area
  - Total: 3.38 km^{2} (1.31 sq mi)

Population (31 December 2020)
  - Total: 1,186
- Time zone: UTC+1 (CET)
  - Summer (DST): UTC+2 (CEST)

Steninge is a locality situated in Halmstad Municipality, Halland County, Sweden, with 1,186 inhabitants in 2020.
