= Eldsberga =

- Location within Halland Location within Sweden
- Coordinates: 56°36′N 13°00′E
- Country: Sweden
- Province: Halland
- County: Halland County
- Municipality: Halmstad Municipality

Area
  - Total: 1.03 km^{2} (0.40 sq mi)

Population (31 December 2020)
  - Total: 770
  - Density: 750/km^{2} (1,900/sq mi)
- Time zone: UTC+1 (CET)
  - Summer (DST): UTC+2 (CEST)

Eldsberga is a locality situated in Halmstad Municipality, Halland County, Sweden, with 770 inhabitants in 2020.
