= Jonas Axeldal =

Swedish footballer

Personal information
- Full name: Jonas Mikael Axeldahl
- Date of birth: 2 September 1970 (age 56)
- Place of birth: Holm, Sweden
- Height: 1.80 m (5 ft 11 in)
- Position: Forward

Senior career*
Years	Team	Apps	(Gls)
1990–1991	Halmstad	45	(17)
1992–1993	Malmö	47	(10)
1994–1996	Öster	46	(7)
1997–1998	Foggia	36	(3)
1999–2000	Ipswich Town	26	(0)
2000–2001	Cambridge United	19	(2)
2002	Häcken		
2003–2006	Ängelholm		
Total		219	(39)

International career
1991–1992	Sweden U21/O	14	(1)
- * Club domestic league appearances and goals

Jonas Mikael Axeldahl (born 2 September 1970) is a Swedish former professional footballer. He played for U.S. Foggia, before moving to Ipswich Town, and then to Cambridge United where he retired. He represented Sweden at the 1992 Summer Olympics in Barcelona.

== Honours ==
Ipswich Town

- Football League First Division play-offs: 2000
