= Simlångsdalen =

- Location within Halland Location within Sweden
- Coordinates: 56°43′N 13°07′E
- Country: Sweden
- Province: Halland
- County: Halland County
- Municipality: Halmstad Municipality

Area
  - Total: 1.41 km^{2} (0.54 sq mi)

Population (31 December 2020)
  - Total: 696
  - Density: 494/km^{2} (1,280/sq mi)
- Time zone: UTC+1 (CET)
  - Summer (DST): UTC+2 (CEST)

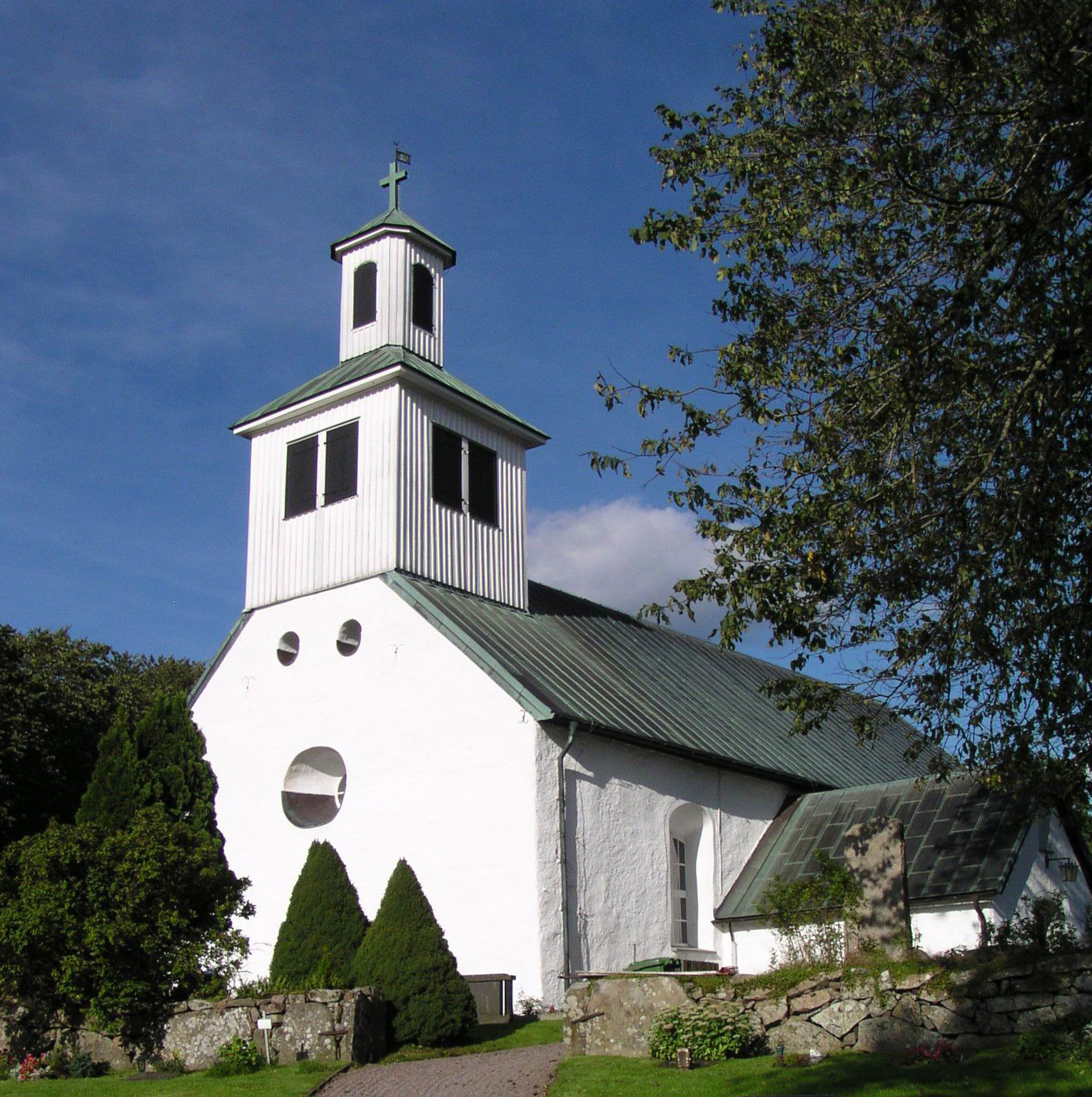
Breared's Church

Simlångsdalen is a locality situated in Halmstad Municipality, Halland County, Sweden, with 696 inhabitants as of 2020.

== History ==
The locality was named Breared until 1912 when the name was changed to Simlångsdalen based on the book published in 1903 by Fredrik Ström titled The people of Simlångsdalen. The name Breared lives on as the name of the nearby lake, the parish and ward and in the name Breareds church.

Simlångsdalen neighboring lakes are named Simlången and Breared Lake. About 2 km south of Simlångsdalen lies "Danska Fallet", a waterfall in the river Assman. Simlångsdalen was previously one of the stations along Halmstad Bolmen Railway, which was in operation from 1889 to 1966. The railway has since been converted into a pedestrian walkway and bicycle path.
