= Tylösand =

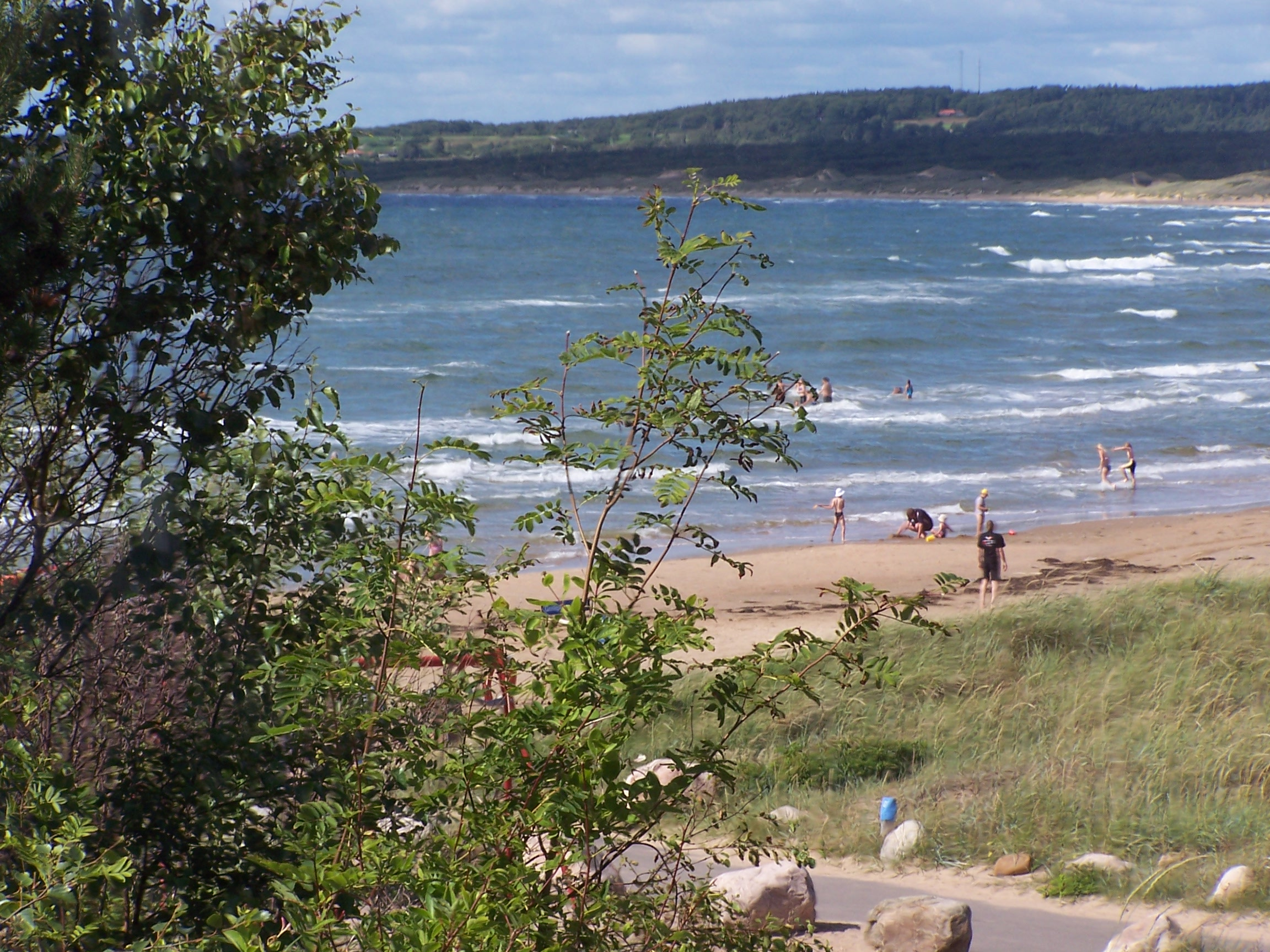
- Tylösand in July 2004

- Location within Halland Location within Sweden
- Coordinates: 56°39′N 12°44′E
- Country: Sweden
- Province: Halland
- County: Halland County
- Municipality: Halmstad Municipality

Area
  - Total: 0.51 km^{2} (0.20 sq mi)

Population (31 December 2010)
  - Total: 399
  - Density: 781/km^{2} (2,020/sq mi)
- Time zone: UTC+1 (CET)
  - Summer (DST): UTC+2 (CEST)

Tylösand is an area and former locality situated in Halmstad Municipality, Halland County, Sweden, with 399 inhabitants in 2010. It is located 7 km west of Halmstad, on Tyludden. Tylösand is famous for its 7 km long sand beach, its golf courses and “Hotell Tylösand”, a hotel owned by Roxette star Per Gessle and Björn Nordstrand. In 2015 the locality was removed and is counted as part of Frösakull by Statistics Sweden.

== History ==
The Roman poet Vergilius, in the middle of the first century BC, refers to the North as “Ultima Thule”, i.e. the furthermost North. The Roman author Plinius, who lived during the first century AD, claims that the world's furthermost place at Thule or Tyle is the place described by the Greek Pytheas from Marseille, who travelled from the Mediterranean to the North in 300 BC. In the 1950s, the German researcher W. Koepp links the above mentioned citations to the area of Tylö in Halland, Sweden.

Excavations in the area of Tylösand and Söndrum show traces of a 6000-year-old Stone Age dwelling, where axes and arrows were found. On Tylö, Bronze Age remains were found. The area of Tylösand was given to Halmstad by the Danes in 1563. According to official documents dating back to the 16th century, Tylösand was mainly inhabited by fishermen. It was almost impossible to cultivate any crops in the surrounding area because of the sand's expansion. One explanation given is that when trees were cut down, the ground could no longer hold the sand that spread over the whole area. The area of Tyludden and Tylösand was difficult to approach and one of its bays called ’’Tjuvahålan” (“the thieves’ hole”) was popular among smugglers. In 1870, the customs service installed a customs station in order to combat smuggling and the same year the lighthouse on Tylö was built. In 1905, a holiday resort for school children was built, making Tylösand a place for holidays and recreation. The sea resort of Tylösand became widely known in the beginning of the 20th century. In 1915, the first inn was built, and in 1917 “Tylösands Havsbad” (“Tylösand's sea baths”) was established by the inn's owner and the royal photographer Johan Hallberg. In 1927, the hotel that is nowadays called “Hotel Tylösand” was built by Tylösands Havsbad and was inaugurated in 1931. The old inn was demolished in 1985.

In the 1920s, camping above Tjuvahålan became popular and the tourists lived in tents. In the 1930s, small cottages were built.

The construction of the golf course began 1935 and was completed 1938.

=== St Olof's chapel ===
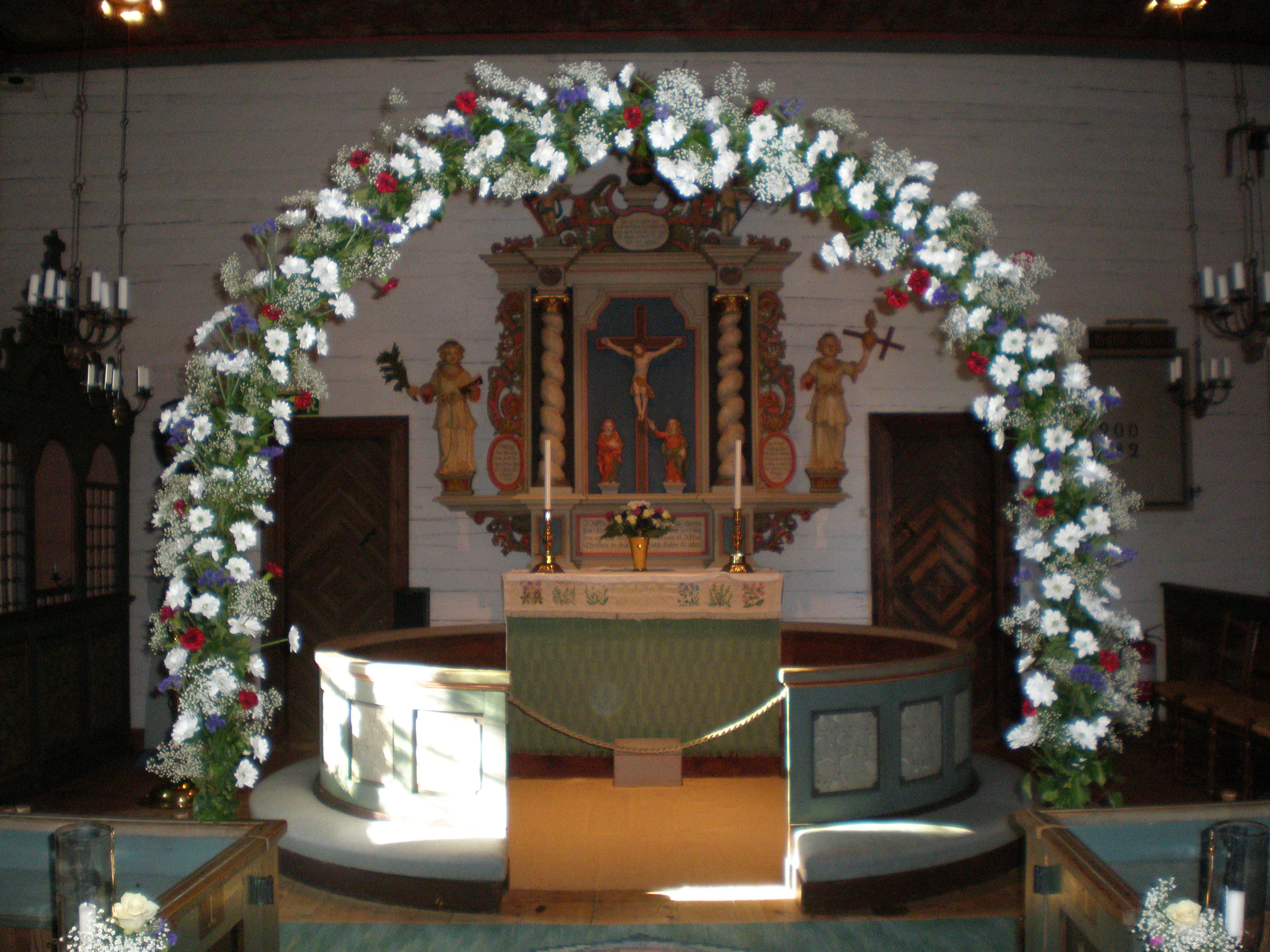
An example of the chapel's wooden decorations

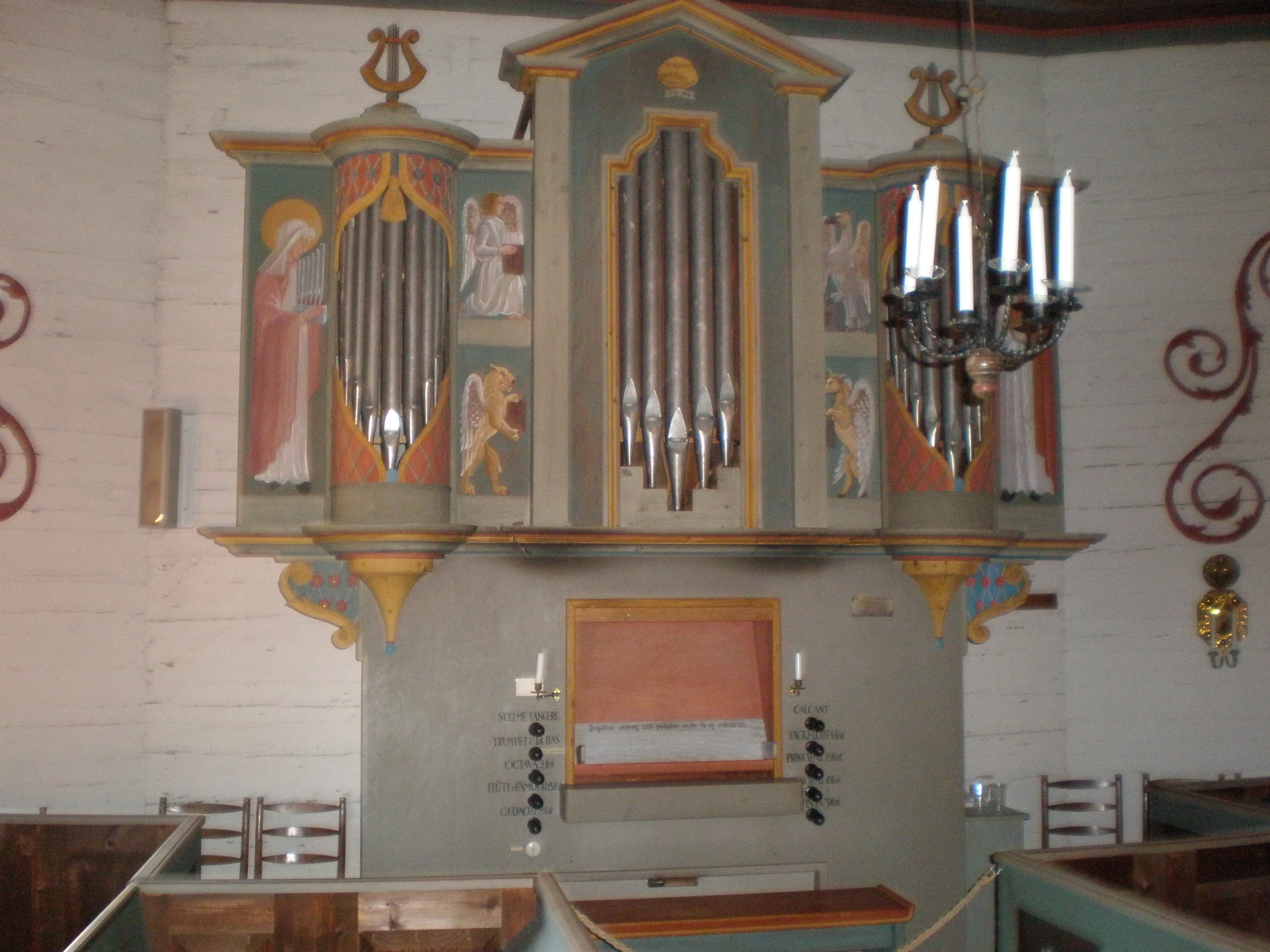
The chapel's organ

The small wooden chapel of St. Olof is situated on top of a stony hill among birches and pine-trees. Originally, the chapel was discovered by the antiquarian Erik Salvén in 1931, when he held a seminar on Greek art in Lidhult, a small community at the borders of the landscapes Halland and Småland. There he heard of a wooden church, with decorations and wooden details, built in 1721 and demolished in the late 19th century. The small church had been sold to a farmer in the village of Prosteköp and had been rebuilt into a residential house. As the farmer had been thinking of pulling down the old chapel because of its lack of amenities for the elderly couple that lived there, Salvén decided to move the church to Tylösand with the help of his good friend and priest Knut Peters. In 1950, the small chapel of St. Olof was erected.

=== Prince Bertil's path ===
Between 1954 and 1997 and during the summer months, Prince Bertil of Sweden used to reside in his villa in Tylösand, located at the end of the street Älgvägen. The 13 km long path derives its name from Prince Bertil. The paths starts at the palace of Halmstad and ends at the sand beach of Tylösand and is suitable for young and old and even for the handicapped. A part of the path passes through the Rhododendron park that was planted in 1933.

== Gallery ==
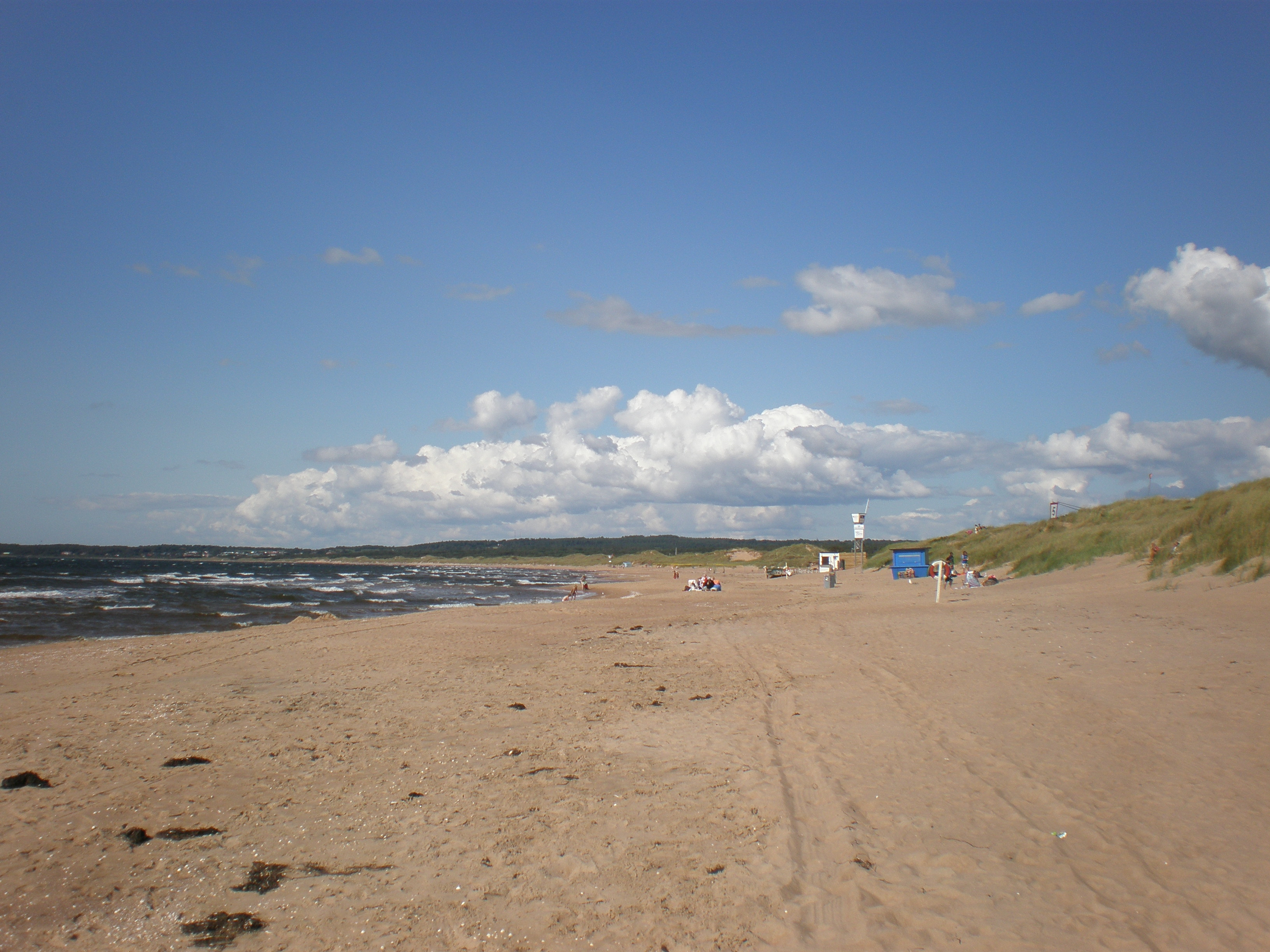
Tylösand's sandy beach

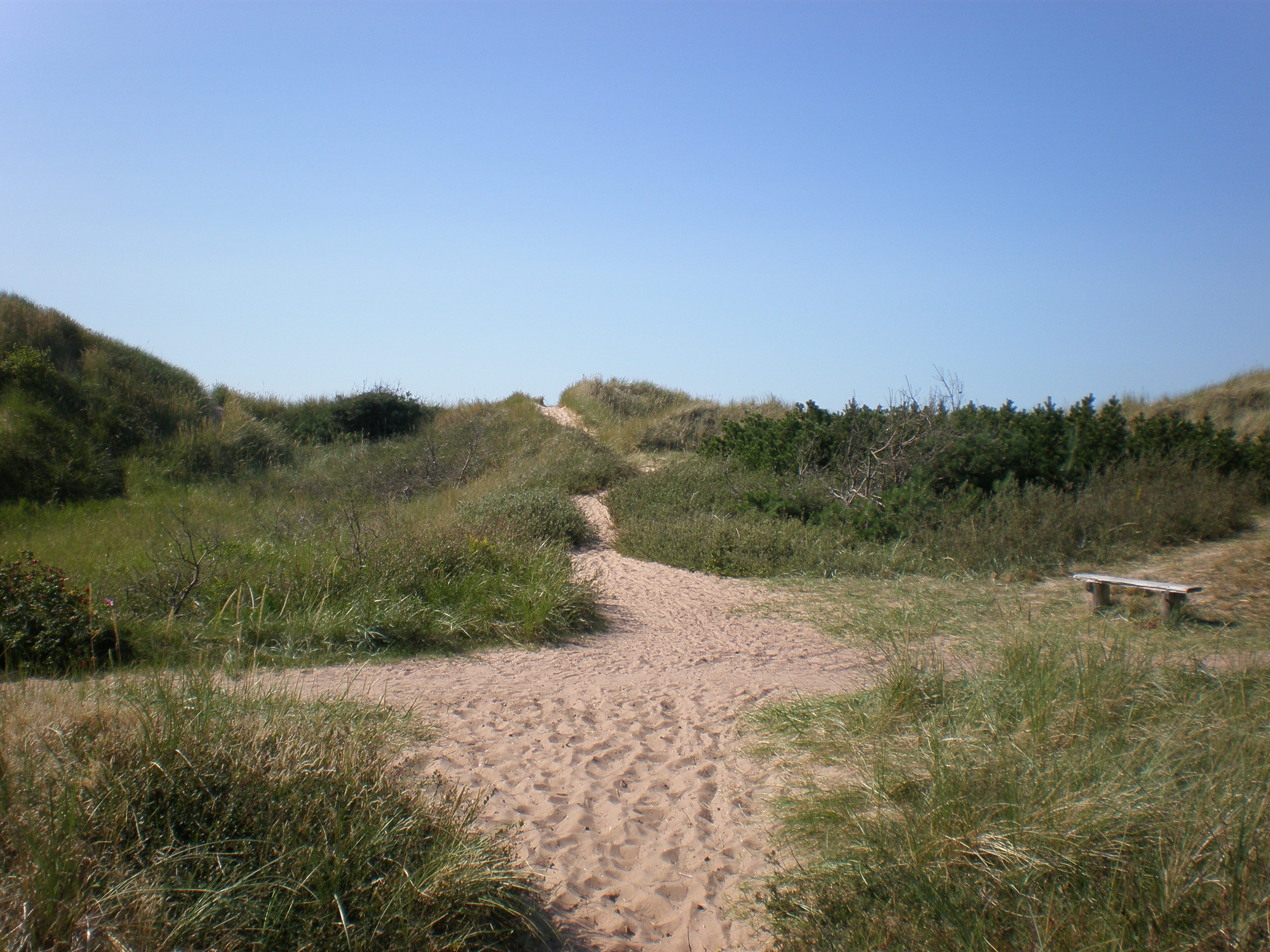
Tylösand sand dunes

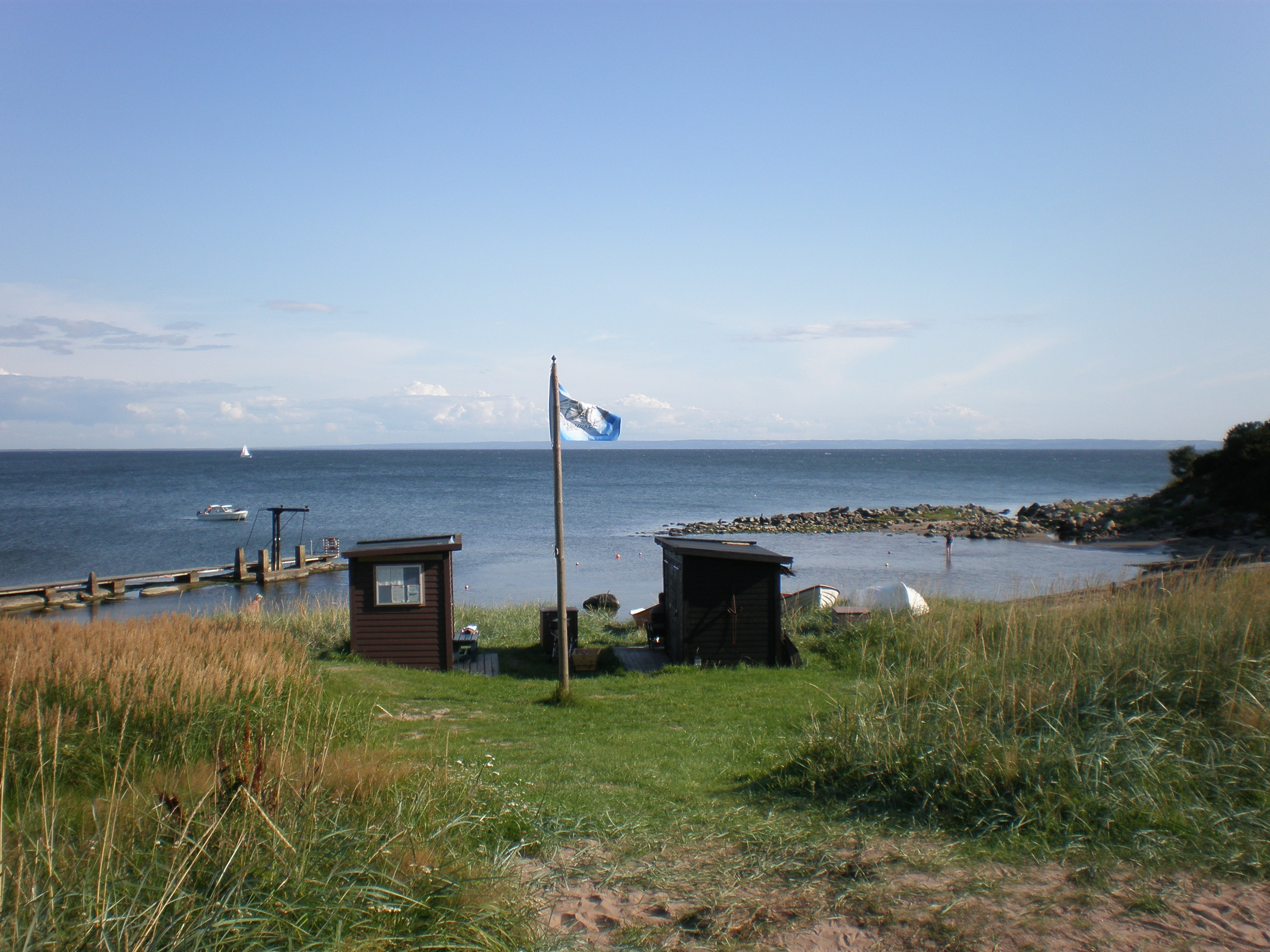
Tjuvahålan today

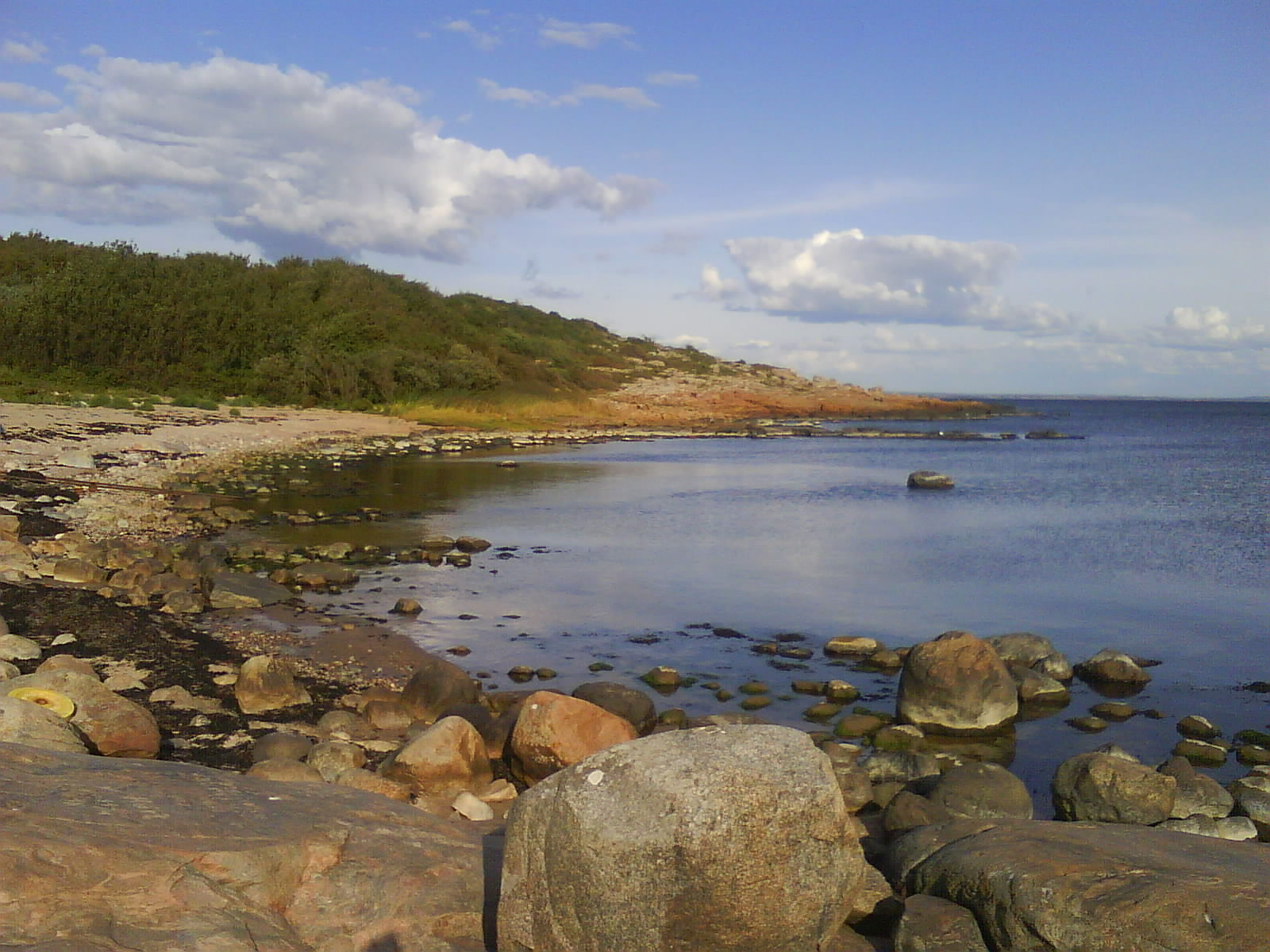
The sea is usually calm in Tjuvahålan

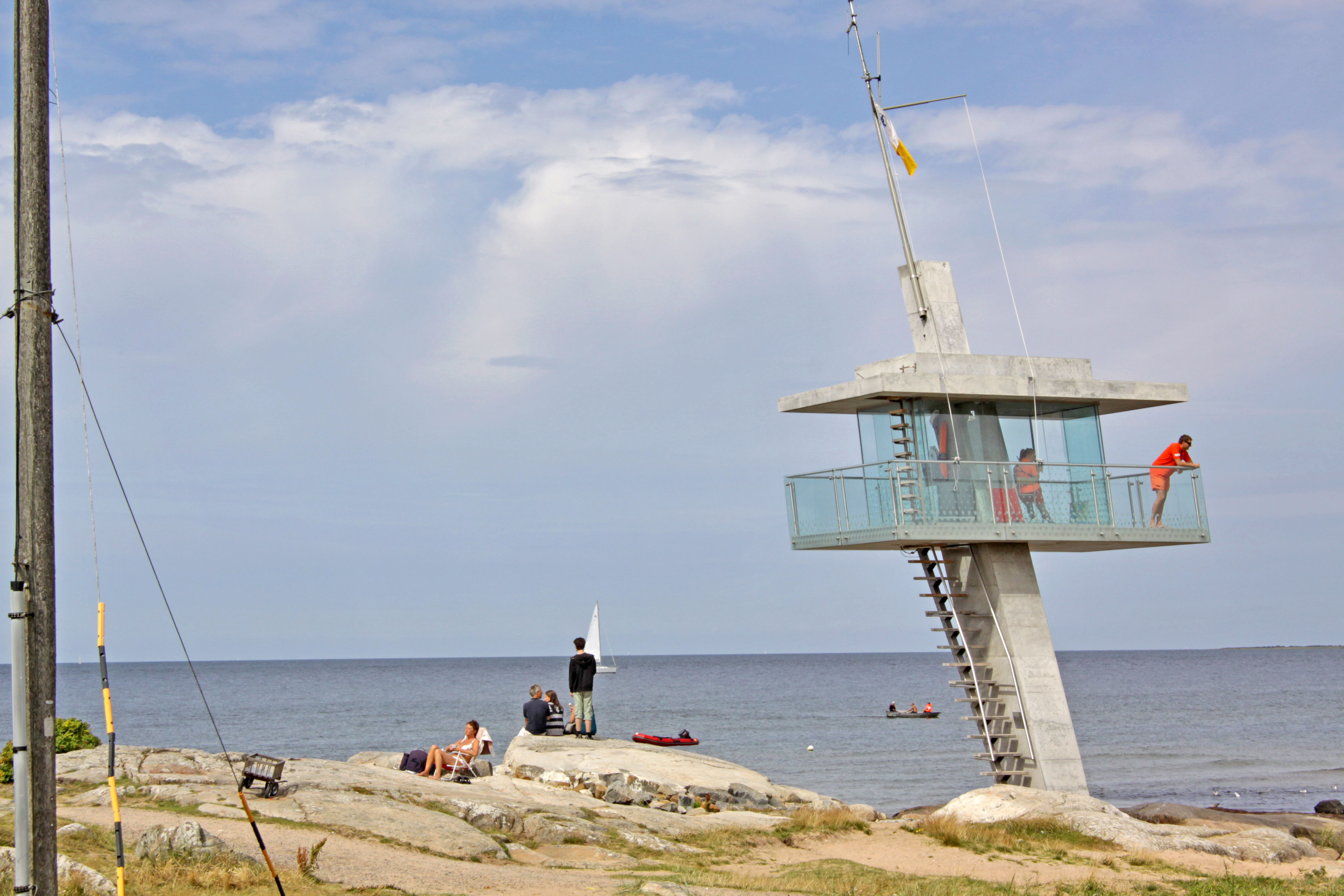
Lifeguard tower in Tylösand

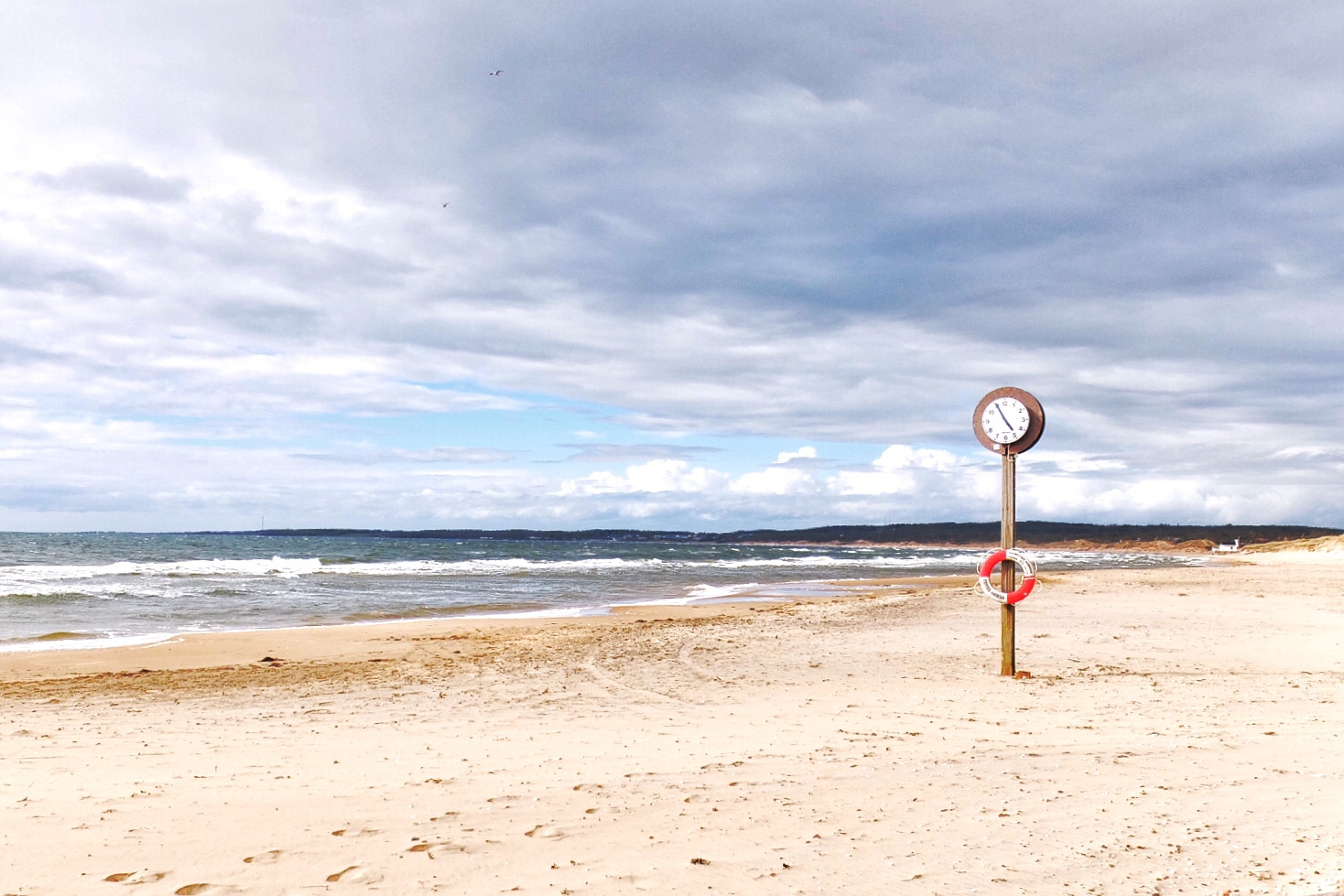
Tylösand beach in May

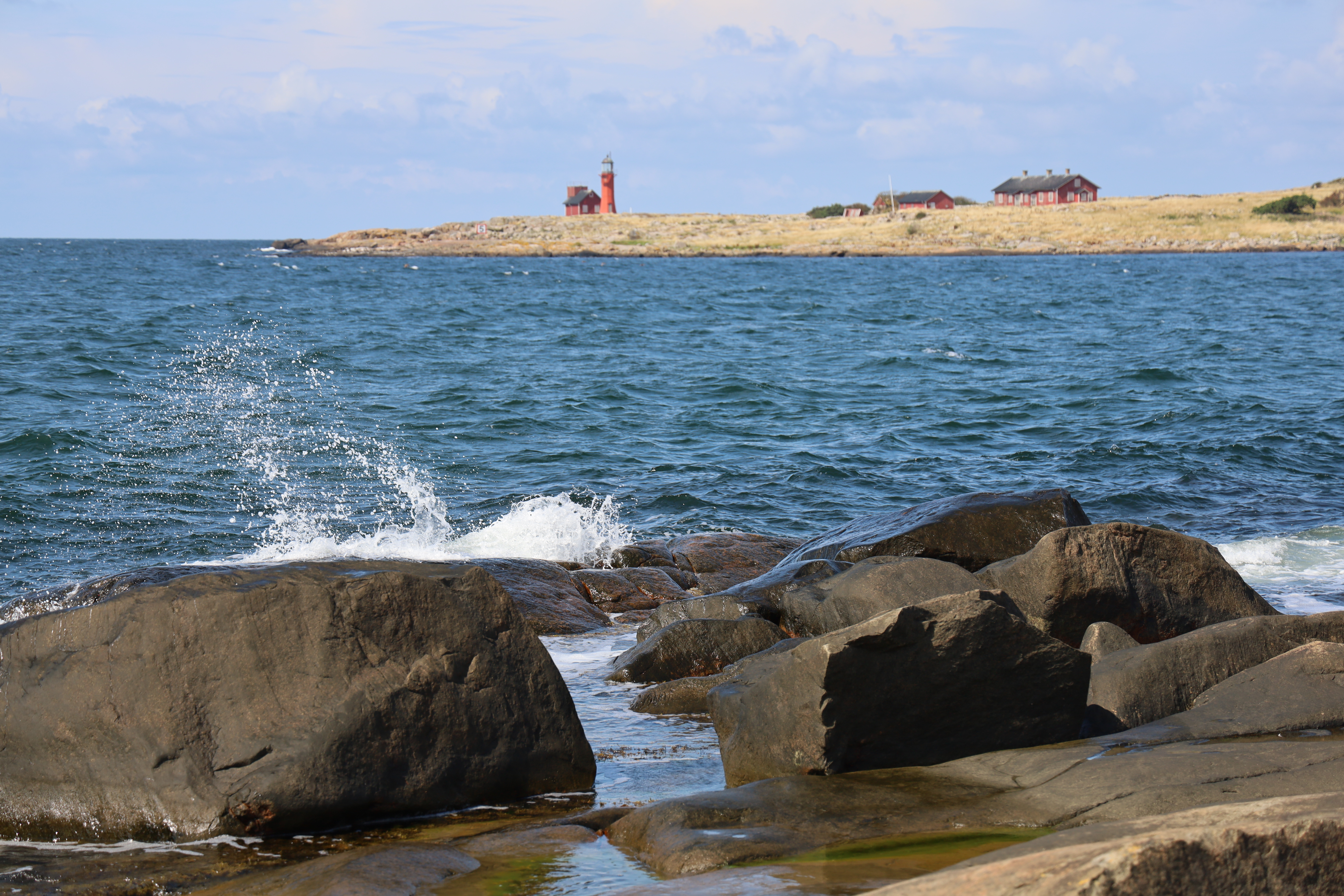
Tylösand lighthouse

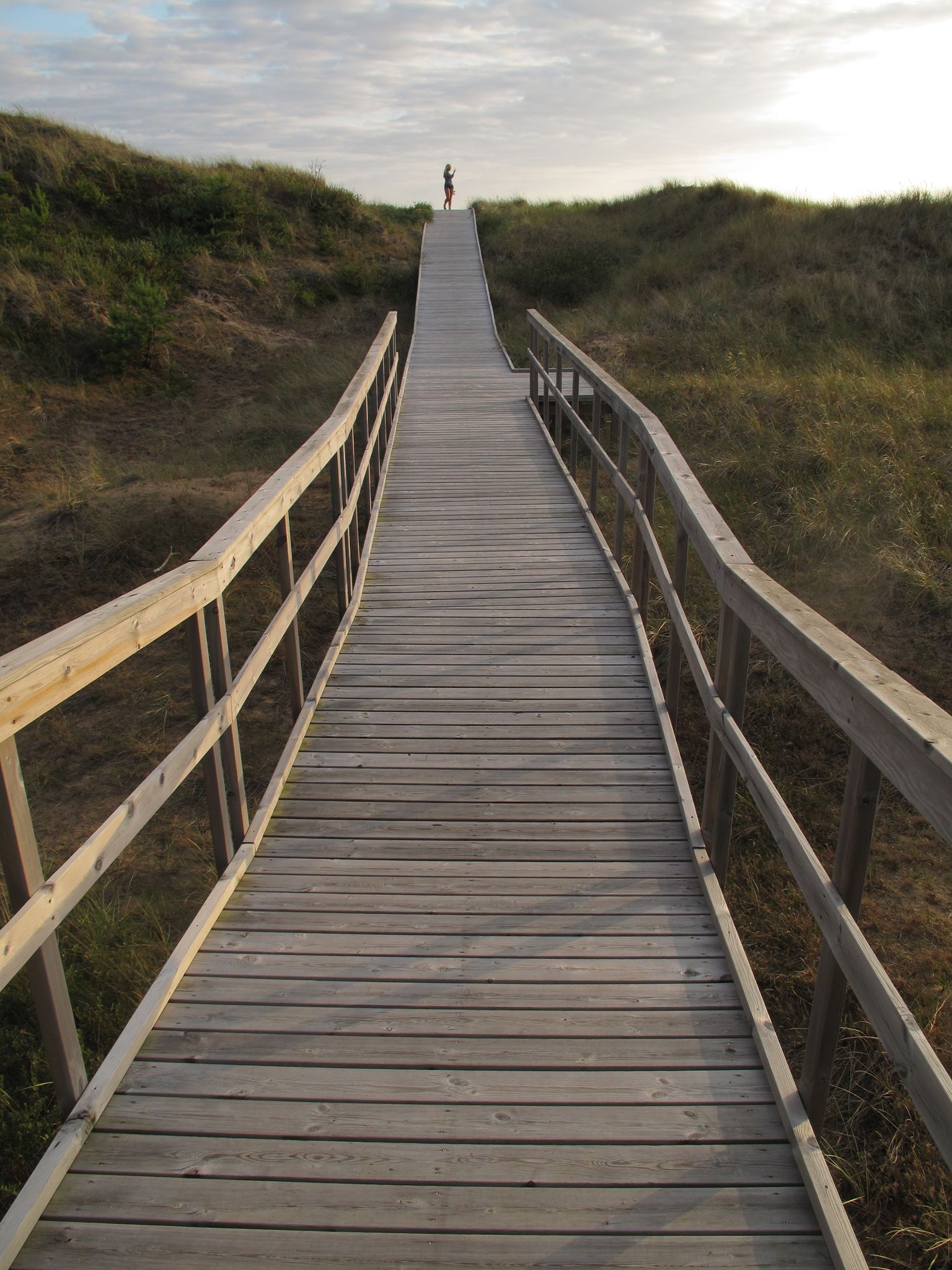
Path through the sand dunes

== See also ==
- Halmstad
- Halmstad Golf Club
