= Holm, Halmstad =

Holm
- Location within Halland Location within Sweden
- Coordinates: 56°44′N 12°51′E
- Country: Sweden
- Province: Halland
- County: Halland County
- Municipality: Halmstad Municipality

Area
  - Total: 1.17 km^{2} (0.45 sq mi)

Population (31 December 2020)
  - Total: 828
  - Density: 708/km^{2} (1,830/sq mi)
- Time zone: UTC+1 (CET)
  - Summer (DST): UTC+2 (CEST)

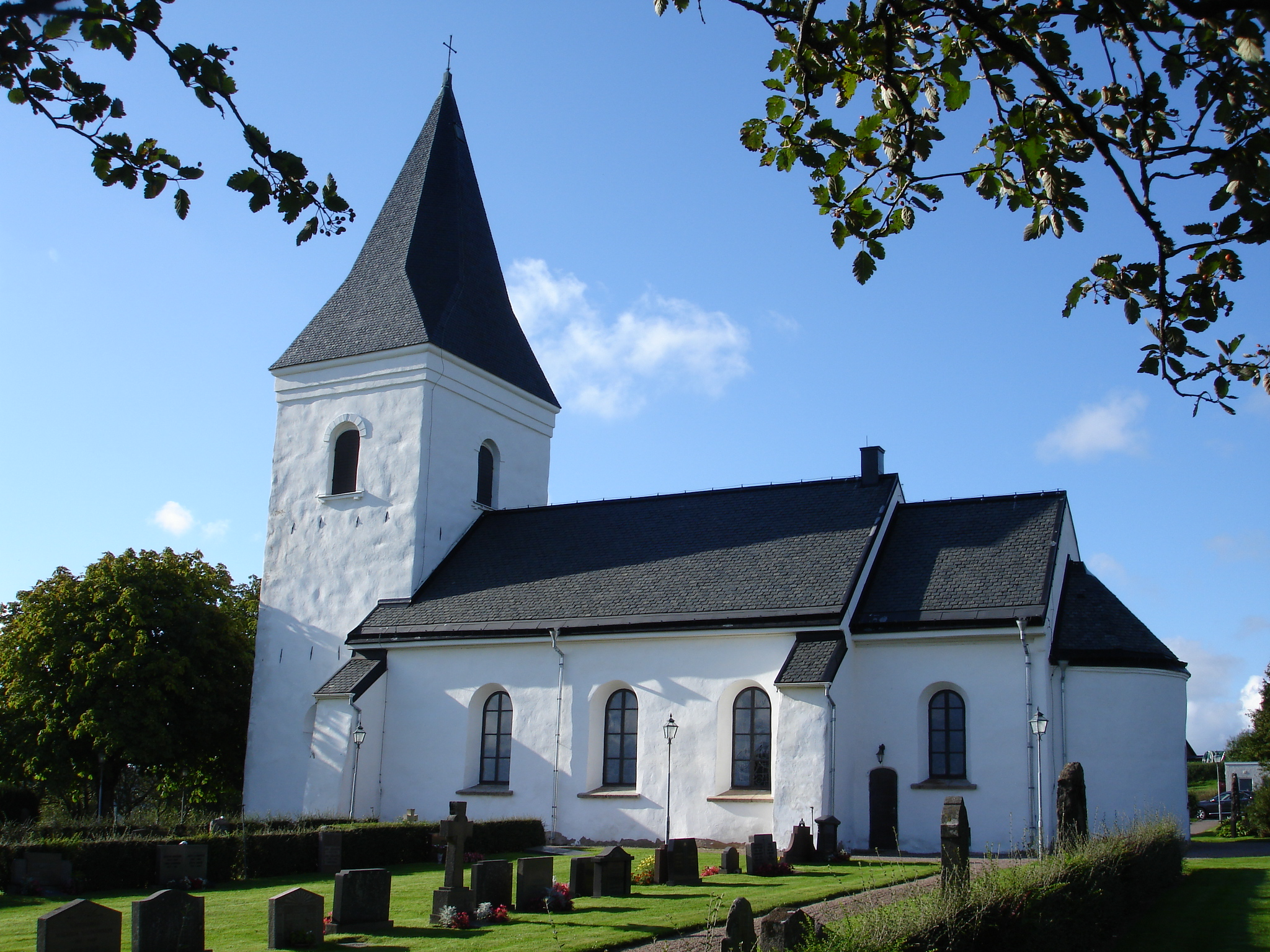
Church in Holm, Halmstad, Sweden (2011)

Holm is a locality situated in Halmstad Municipality, Halland County, Sweden, with 828 inhabitants in 2020.

== Famous resident ==
- Jonas Axeldal (b. 1970 in Holm), football player
