= Gullbrandstorp =

- Location within Halland Location within Sweden
- Coordinates: 56°42′N 12°44′E
- Country: Sweden
- Province: Halland
- County: Halland County
- Municipality: Halmstad Municipality

Area
  - Total: 1.48 km^{2} (0.57 sq mi)

Population (31 December 2020)
  - Total: 1,781
  - Density: 1,200/km^{2} (3,120/sq mi)
- Time zone: UTC+1 (CET)
  - Summer (DST): UTC+2 (CEST)

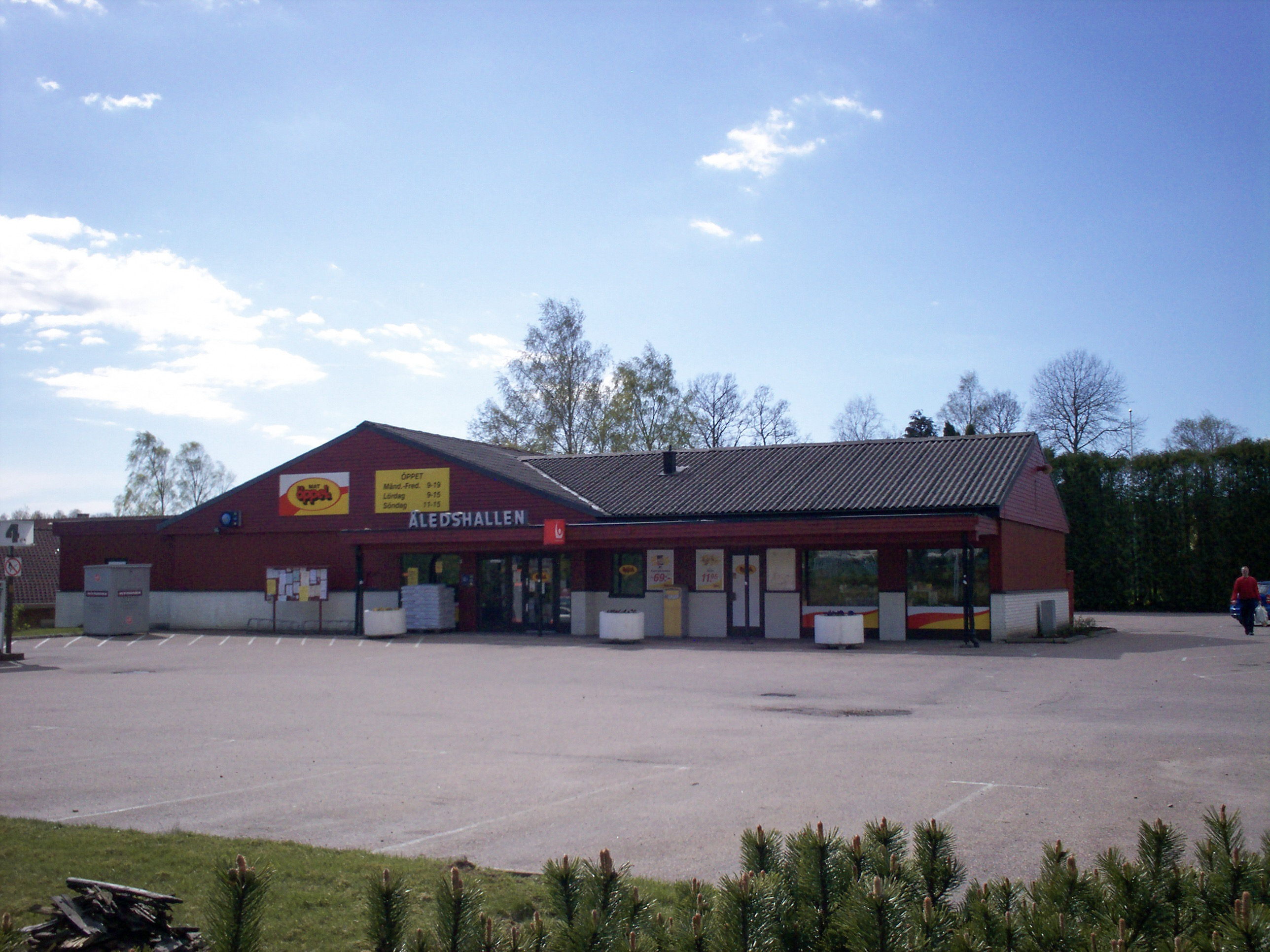
Local grocery store

Gullbrandstorp (Swedish pronunciation: [ˈɡɵ̂lːbrandsˌtɔrp]) is a locality situated in Halmstad Municipality, Halland County, Sweden, with 1,781 inhabitants in 2020.
