= Laxvik =

- Location within Halland Location within Sweden
- Coordinates: 56°36′N 12°55′E
- Country: Sweden
- Province: Halland
- County: Halland County
- Municipality: Halmstad Municipality

Area
  - Total: 0.65 km^{2} (0.25 sq mi)

Population (31 December 2020)
  - Total: 483
- Time zone: UTC+1 (CET)
  - Summer (DST): UTC+2 (CEST)

Laxvik is a locality situated in Halmstad Municipality, Halland County, Sweden, with 483 inhabitants in 2020.
