= Halmstad–Bolmen Railway =

Railway in Sweden

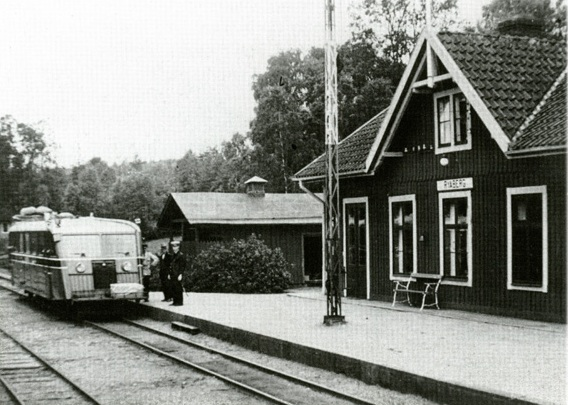
Ryaberg station, 1940s

Halmstad Bolmen Railway (Swedish: Halmstad–Bolmens Järnväg, HBJ) was a 64 km (40 miles) long narrow gauge railway line from Halmstad to Bolmen in the Halland County of Sweden. It had a gauge of 1,067 mm (3 ft 6 in).

== History ==
The chamber of commerce of Halmstadt contracted captain Wilhelm Gagner of the civil engineering corps to provide a cost estimate for building a railway line from the terminus of the Vislanda–Bolmens Järnväg (ViBJ) in Bolmen to Halmstad. He compared two alternative routes, one via Skeen and the other crossing the Fettjesund.

During a meeting on 28 August 1885 in Halmstad, he proposed that a railway line could be built at a cost of 1,499 mio Swedish Crowns. The interest in building a line was noted and many parishes intended to invest. On 28 October 1885 the council of Halmstad invested 200,000 Crowns. At the next meeting on 27 November 1885 a committee was set up, and a temporary management board was put on place. The local politician Landshövding Carl Nordenfalk, Friherre D. E. Stjerncrona and the land owner and Member of the Riksdag Ivar Lyttkens from Skedala and A. L. Apelstam, N. Lundell, C. F. von Sydow, A. E. Pihl, C. G. Löfström, G. Bengtsson and C. Leander Larsson applied for a concession for a railway line crossing the Fettjesund at a cost estimate of 1,441 mio Crones. The concession was granted on 6 May 1886.

== Halmstad–Bolmens Järnvägsaktiebolag ==
The Halmstad–Bolmens Järnvägsaktiebolag was founded on 4 December 1886 with Carl Nordenfalk, Ivar Lyttkens, merchant A. E. Pihl and merchant Anders L. Apelstam, C. L. Larsson of Älmån, banker C. G. Löfström and reverend L Wickelgren in the board of directors.

Carl Johan Jehander, also known as Swedish railway king ("Järnvägskungen"), was chosen as general contractor at a value of 1,29 mio Crones. The survey of the track commenced on 30 April 1887. On 12 June 1887 the ground-breaking ceremony was held near Skedala. It was planned to connect the railway line to the line of Halmstad–Nässjö Järnvägsaktiebolag, which operated the line from Halmstad to Nässjö, which had been opened in 1882.

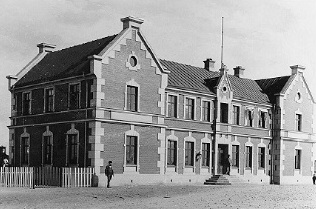
Halmstad Östra station

HBJ decided to build its own station Halmstad Östra. On 24 August 1889 the two railway lines were bolted together. In summer 1889 the railway line from Halmstad to Skedala was approved for public transport. The remainder from Skedala to Bolmen was inaugurated on 4 November 1889.

The Swedish rail statistics (Svensk Järnvägsstatistik) list the cost for building the track as 1.719.976 Crowns. The rails were built of steel and had nominal load capacity of 17,2 kg/m. The maximum gradient was 17 ‰ and the minimum radius 300 meter. The maximum speed was set to 35 km/h (22 mph).

== Operation ==
A roundhouse with eight tracks and a turn table with a diameter of 8 m (26 ft) was built in Halmstad south of the station building. The affiliated maintenance yard was used until 1927. Subsequently, the rolling stock was maintained by Halmstad–Nässjö Järnvägsaktiebolag (HNJ). In Bolmen a two track locomotive shed was built and the 9 m turntable of ViBJ was used.

Over time some improvements were implemented: Three bridges were rebuilt in 1905, and the rails were replaced by heavier rail with a capacity of 24,8 kg/m between 1910 and 1921. Three stations were refurbished between 1920 and 1924. The line was improved between 1916 and 1925 at its highest point near Nannarp.

== Rolling stock ==
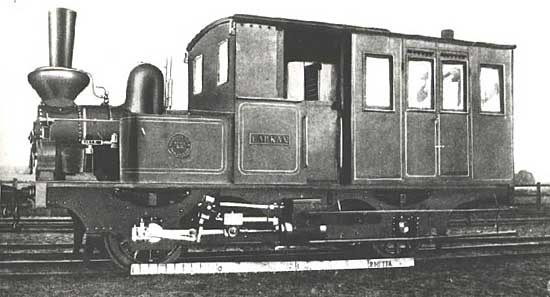
Locomotive No 4 of Halmstad–Bolmens Järnväg before delivery

The following rolling stock was used:

Steam locomotives, rail tractors, rail cars and coaches
No	Name	Type	Axes	Builder	Year of construction	Comments
1	HALMSTAD	Tank engine	C t	Nydqvist och Holm, Trollhättan	251; 1887	1947: SJ K3t 4050, 1954 scrapped
2	NORDENFALK	Tank engine	C t	Nydqvist och Holm, Trollhättan	252; 1888	1933 scrapped
3	LIDHULT	Tank engine	C t	Nydqvist och Holm, Trollhättan	253; 1888	1947: SJ K3t 4051, 1956 scrapped
4	LÄRKAN	Tank engine	A 1 t	Nydqvist och Holm, Trollhättan	261; 1889	with a cabin for passengers and luggage, 1933 scrapped
5	HALLAND	Tank engine	C t	Nydqvist och Holm, Trollhättan	405; 1895	1934 scrapped
6		Tank engine	1' C t	Nydqvist och Holm, Trollhättan	670; 1902	1947: SJ S10t 4052, 1957 scrapped
7		Tank engine	1' C 1' t	Henschel, Kassel	17826; 1920	1947: SJ S3t 4053, 1966 scrapped
11		Lokomotor	B	Bjurström AB Slipmaterial, Västervik	76; 1930	1947: SJ Zt 197, 1967 scrapped
20		Diesel rail car	(1A)' (A1)'	Hilding Carlsson, Umeå	1937	1947: SJ Yot 630, 1960 scrapped
21		Diesel rail car	(1A)' (A1)'	Hilding Carlsson, Umeå	1938	1947: SJ Yot 631, 1960 scrapped
22		Diesel rail car	(1A)' (A1)'	Hilding Carlsson, Umeå	1944	1947: SJ Yot 632, 1964 scrapped
23		Diesel rail car	(1A)' (A1)'	Hilding Carlsson, Umeå	1946	1947: SJ Yot 633, 1965 scrapped
101		Coach	2' 2'	Hilding Carlsson, Umeå	1939	1947: SJ UDFot 1648, 1965 scrapped
103		Coach	2' 2'	Hilding Carlsson, Umeå	1945	1947: SJ UCFo2t 1649, 1957 scrapped

Seven passenger coaches and two combined luggage and post carriages with two axles each as well as 56 goods waggons were purchased. The rolling stock increased over time: finally HBJ owned 7 passenger cars with two axles each, 3 passenger cars with bogies and 3 combined luggage and post carriages as well as 116 goods waggons with two axles each and 6 goods waggons with bogies.

== Rail track from Åsen to Unnen ==
The terms of the concession required building a railway line from Åsen to the lake Unnen. This was completed in 1895.

Die Gesellschaft war mit einem Antrag auf die Verschiebung des Baus dieser Nebenstrecke auf einen späteren Zeitpunkt erfolgreich.

Carl Johan Jehander, the general contractor for building the line from Halmstad to Bolmen, owned a steam saw, which had been built in 1888 in Lidhult. He purchased on 16 June 1893 approx. 0,59 hectare land for 400 Crowns at the Unnen lake, to build his own railway station.

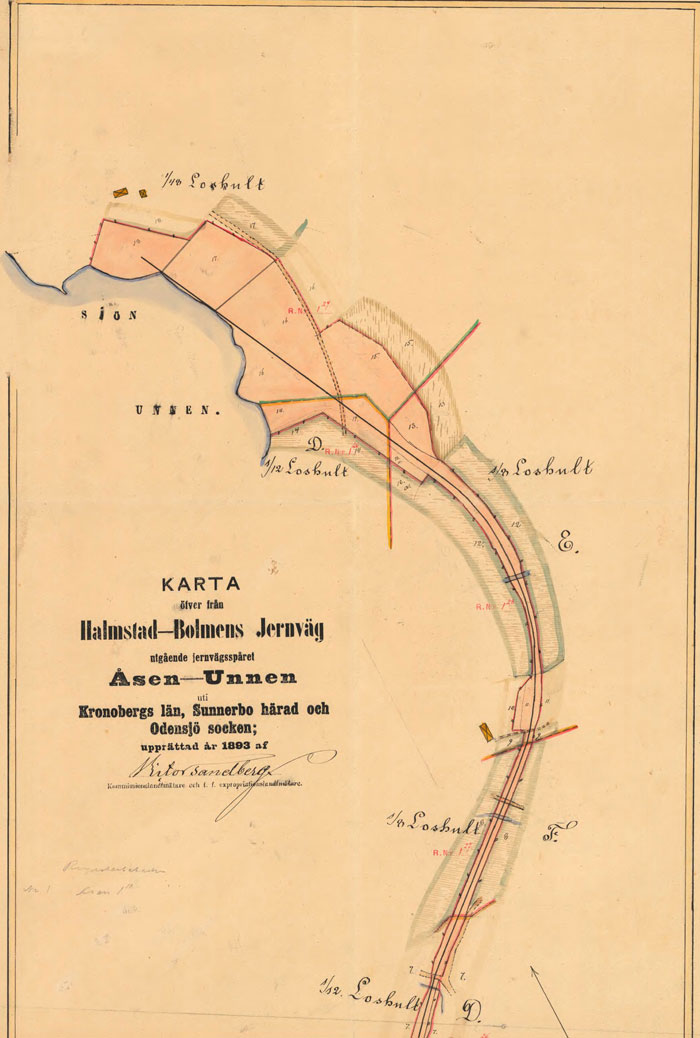
Map with track from Åsen to Unnen (1893)

The land for the rail track from Åsen to Unnen was possessed in 1893 by the railway company against payment of a compensation. The building of the track cost 24,000 Crowns. It was 2,5 km (1.5 miles) long and was used by two trains per day, to transport goods and passengers from the steam ships Vega or Freya, which crossed the lake to Södra Unnaryd.

Jehander moved his saw mill to the Unnen lake, when the railway line was completed in 1895. It was strategically located for obtaining logs by rafting across the lake, and for transporting sawn timber away by the railway. In November 1896 he sold the saw mill to the timber merchant August Persson, who already owned several steam saws. He employed approx. 50 workers and moved with his family from Älmås to the new works on 5. November 1897. On 14 November 1898 he relocated the headquarters to Yttra Röshult.

During World War I export of sawn timber declined, which affected the overall timber industry in Sweden. Thus August Persson set up a haulage company and sold his saw mill. Timber transport declined on this line and ceased in 1939. The saw mill owner Frans Andersson pleaded to the government of prime minister Per Albin Hansson to keep the track in operation. However, the government decided in 1940 to close the line and disassemble the track for scrap. The dam over the lake was left in place, so that the saw mill owner could build a road for heavy lorries. The railway line from Åsen to Unnen was closed in October 1941. Statens Järnvägar took over Halmstad–Bolmens Jernvägsaktiebolag on 1 July 1947. The land was subsequently sold to station master Anders Lindqvist from Oskarström on 26 May 1948.

== Government ownership ==
In May 1939 the government decided to combine the Swedish rail network. The governmental rail office (Swedish: Kungliga Järnvägsstyrelsens) obtained the task to negotiate the voluntary takeover with the private rail companies. The negotiations with HBJ began in 1995 after World War II had ended. These resulted in the sale of HBJ and its integration into Statens Järnvägar (SJ) on 1 July 1947.

== Decommissioning ==
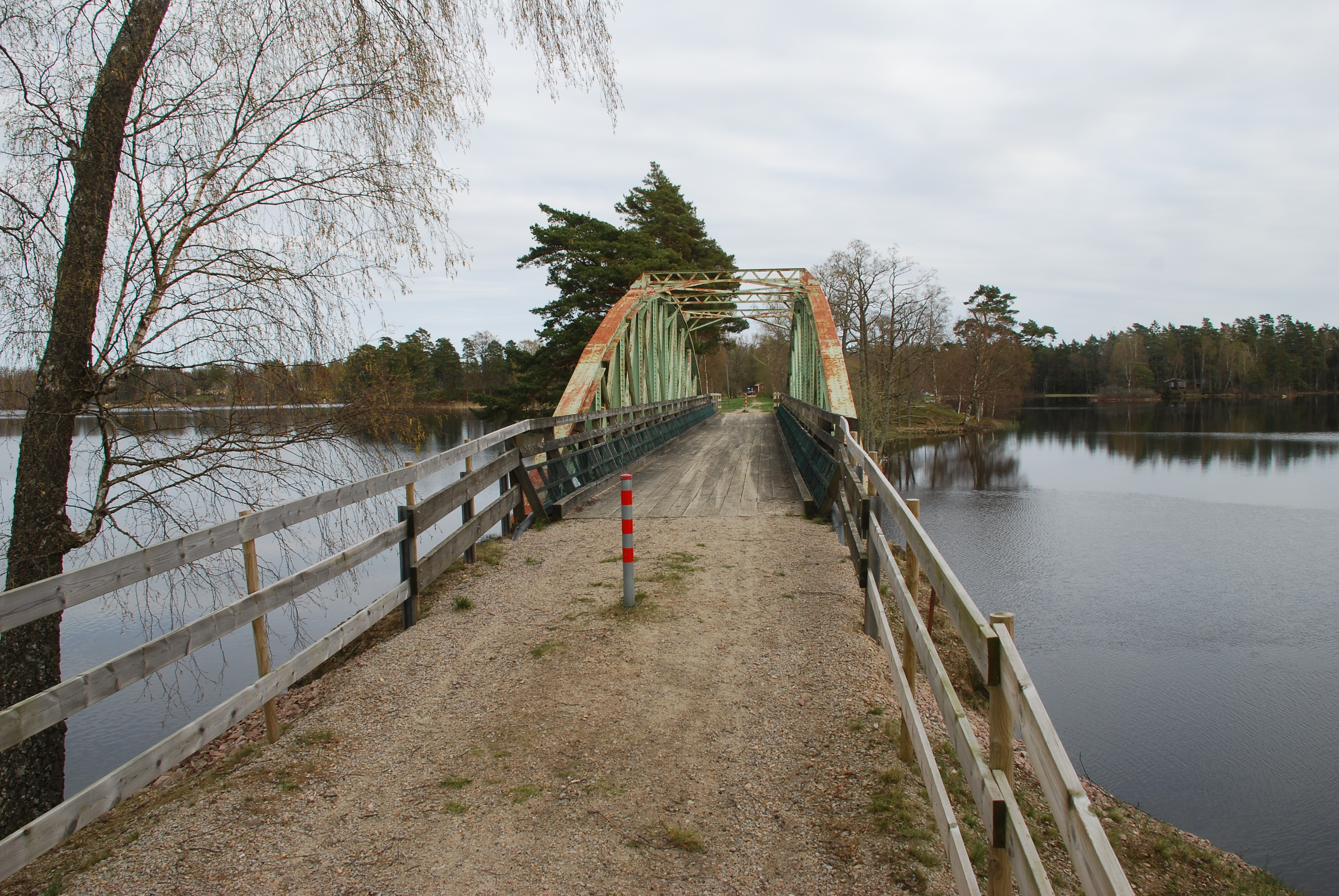
The bridge over the Fettjesund is now used as a cycle track

Due to a decline in traffic, operation ceased between Halmstad and Bygget. In October 1966 the rest of the track was taken out of use.
