= Halmstad City Hall =

Seat of Halmstad city government

- Halmstads rådhus
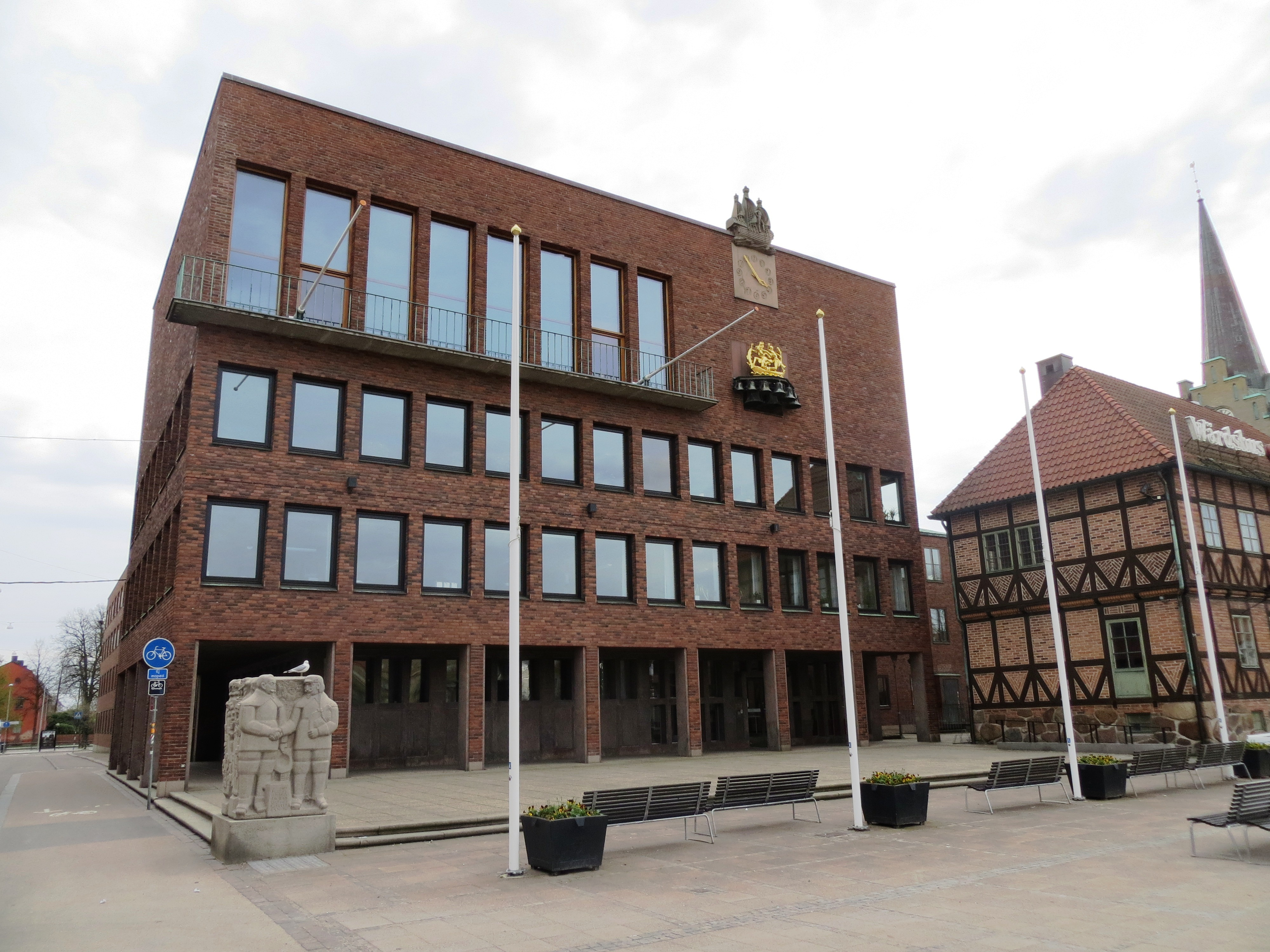
- Halmstad City Hall in 2012
- Interactive map of the Halmstad City Hall area

General information
- Type: Government offices
- Architectural style: Functionalism
- Location: Halmstad, Sweden
- Coordinates: 56°40′24.2″N 12°51′27.3″E
- Current tenants: Halmstad City Council
- Inaugurated: 18 September 1938
- Owner: Halmstad Municipality

Design and construction
- Architects: Yngve Ahlbom, Nils Sterner

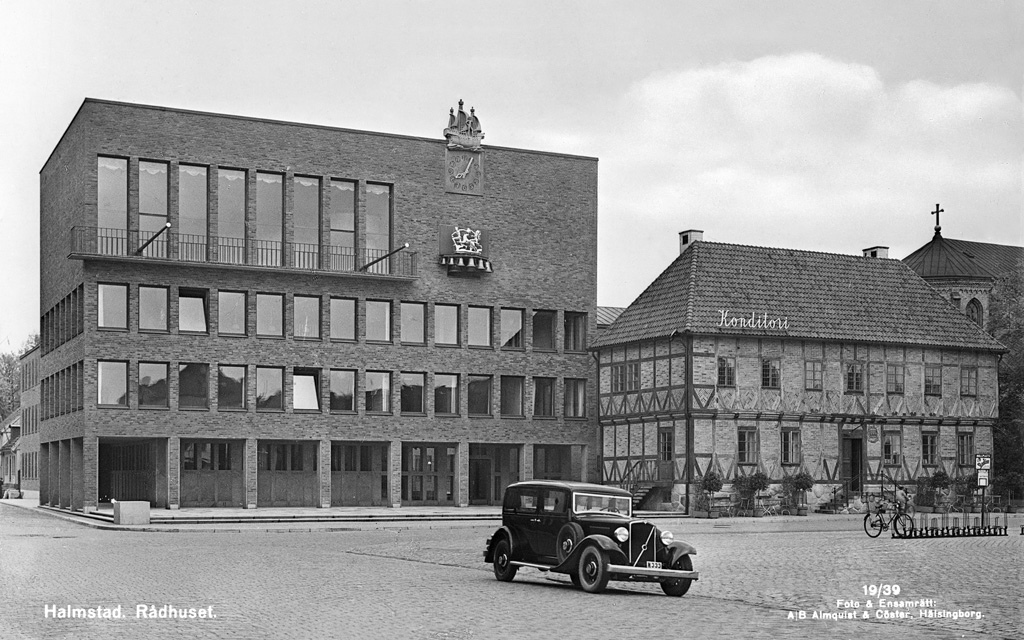
Halmstad City Hall in 1938

Halmstad City Hall (Swedish: Halmstads Rådhus, Stadshuset locally) is the seat of Halmstad Municipality in Halmstad, Sweden. It stands next to Stora Torg, the town square of Halmstad and it houses government offices, conference rooms, and ceremonial halls.

== Copy building ==
There is a mirrored copy of Halmstad City Hall in Norwich, United Kingdom called "Norfolk House". Norfolk House was inaugurated on 27th of April 1951. Predecessor to DHSS was its first tenant.

== See also ==
- Stora Torg, Halmstad
- Halmstads rådhus
