= Chrysler Open =

Golf tournament in Sweden

Tournament information
- Location: Halmstad, Sweden
- Established: 1998
- Course: Halmstad Golf Club
- Par: 72
- Tour: Ladies European Tour
- Format: Stroke play
- Prize fund: £150,000 (€235,000)
- Month played: June/July
- Final year: 2000

Tournament record score
- Aggregate: 273 Laura Davies (1999)
- To par: −15 Laura Davies (1999)

Final champion
- (Sweden) Carin Koch

The Chrysler Open was a women's professional golf tournament on the Ladies European Tour that took place in Sweden.

Held at Sjögärde Golf Club in 1998, the tournament was moved to Halmstad Golf Club, host of the 2007 Solheim Cup, in 1999. The tournament's name is the result of a sponsorship agreement with Harry Karlsson Bilimport AB, importer of Chrysler vehicles.

Laura Davies won the 1998 and 1999 installments scoring 284 (72-71-71-70) and 273 (71-69-66-67).

Carin Koch won the final tournament after scoring 277 (−11) following rounds of 70-73-65-69, finishing 4 strokes ahead of Samantha Head at 281 and 7 strokes ahead of Sophie Gustafson and Catrin Nilsmark at 284. Laura Davies, at 289 strokes, finished tied for 10th place along with Helen Alfredsson, Judith Van Hagen and Åsa Gottmo (still an amateur).

== Winners ==
Year	Dates	Venue	Winner	Country	Score	To par	Margin of victory	Runner(s)-up	Winner's share (€)
1998	23–26 Jul	Sjögärde Golf Club	Laura Davies	England	284	(−8)	6 strokes	(England) Trish Johnson (Spain) Raquel Carriedo	18,750
1999	1–4 Jul	Halmstad Golf Club	Laura Davies	England	273	(−15)	8 strokes	(England) Alison Nicholas	22,500
2000	1–4 Jun	Halmstad Golf Club	Carin Koch	Sweden	277	(−11)	4 strokes	(England) Samantha Head	36,303.75
