= Skedala =

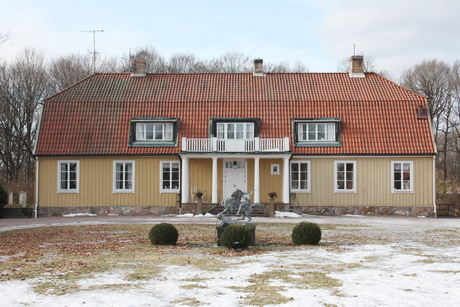
- The Skedala estate in 1996

- Location within Halland Location within Sweden
- Coordinates: 56°42′N 12°58′E
- Country: Sweden
- Province: Halland
- County: Halland County
- Municipality: Halmstad Municipality

Area
  - Total: 0.64 km^{2} (0.25 sq mi)

Population (31 December 2020)
  - Total: 436
  - Density: 680/km^{2} (1,800/sq mi)
- Time zone: UTC+1 (CET)
  - Summer (DST): UTC+2 (CEST)

Skedala is a locality situated in Halmstad Municipality, Halland County, Sweden, with 436 inhabitants in 2020.
