= Fyllinge =

- Location within Halland Location within Sweden
- Coordinates: 56°39′N 12°55′E
- Country: Sweden
- Province: Halland
- County: Halland County
- Municipality: Halmstad Municipality

Area
  - Total: 2.47 km^{2} (0.95 sq mi)

Population (31 December 2010)
  - Total: 2,927
  - Density: 1,184/km^{2} (3,070/sq mi)
- Time zone: UTC+1 (CET)
  - Summer (DST): UTC+2 (CEST)

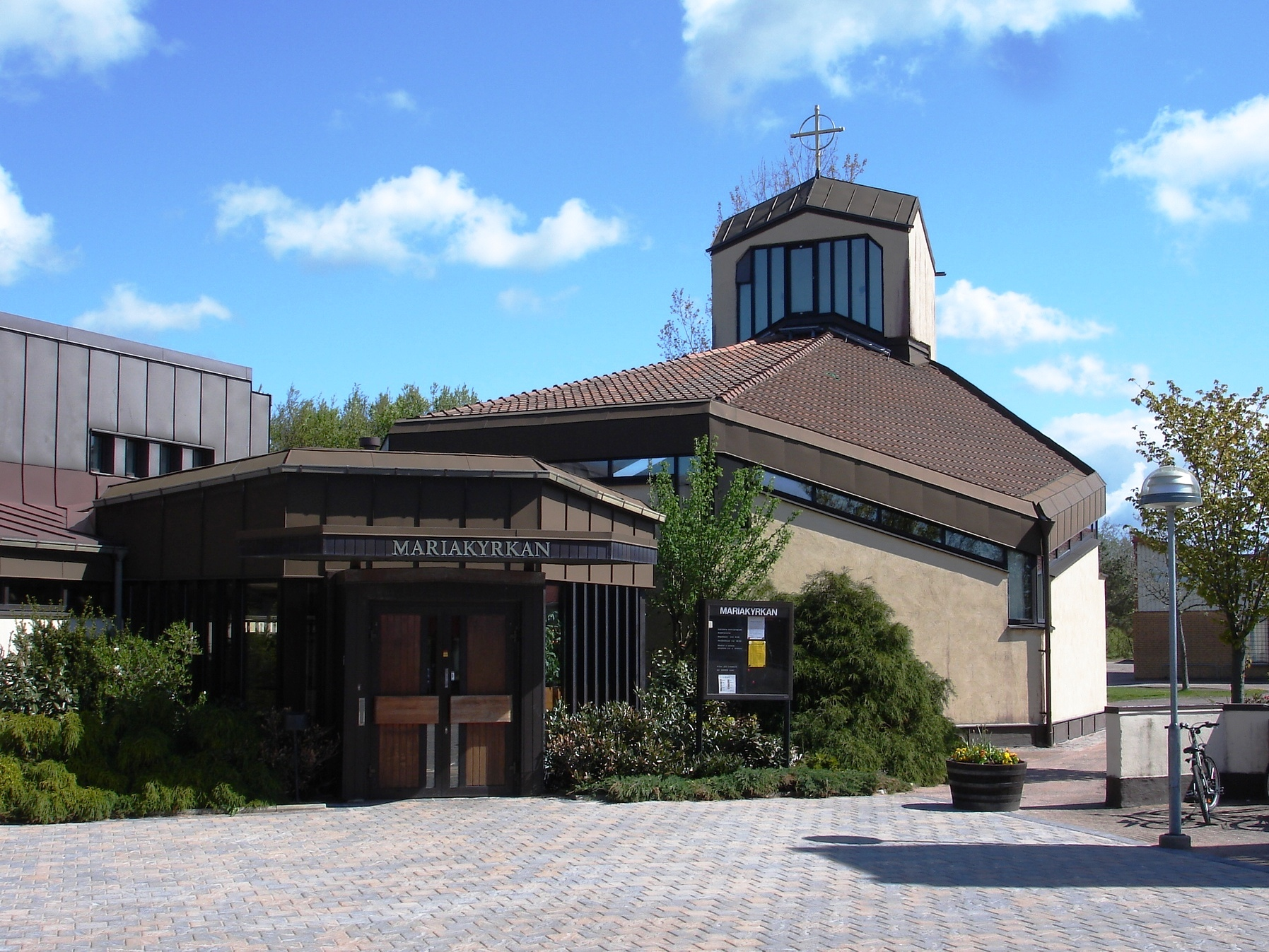
Mariakyrkan Church in Fyllinge

Fyllinge was a locality situated in Halmstad Municipality, Halland County, Sweden, with 2,927 inhabitants in 2010. Since 2015 the locality is now counted by Statistics Sweden as part of Halmstad.
