= Högstadium =

Scandinavian school type

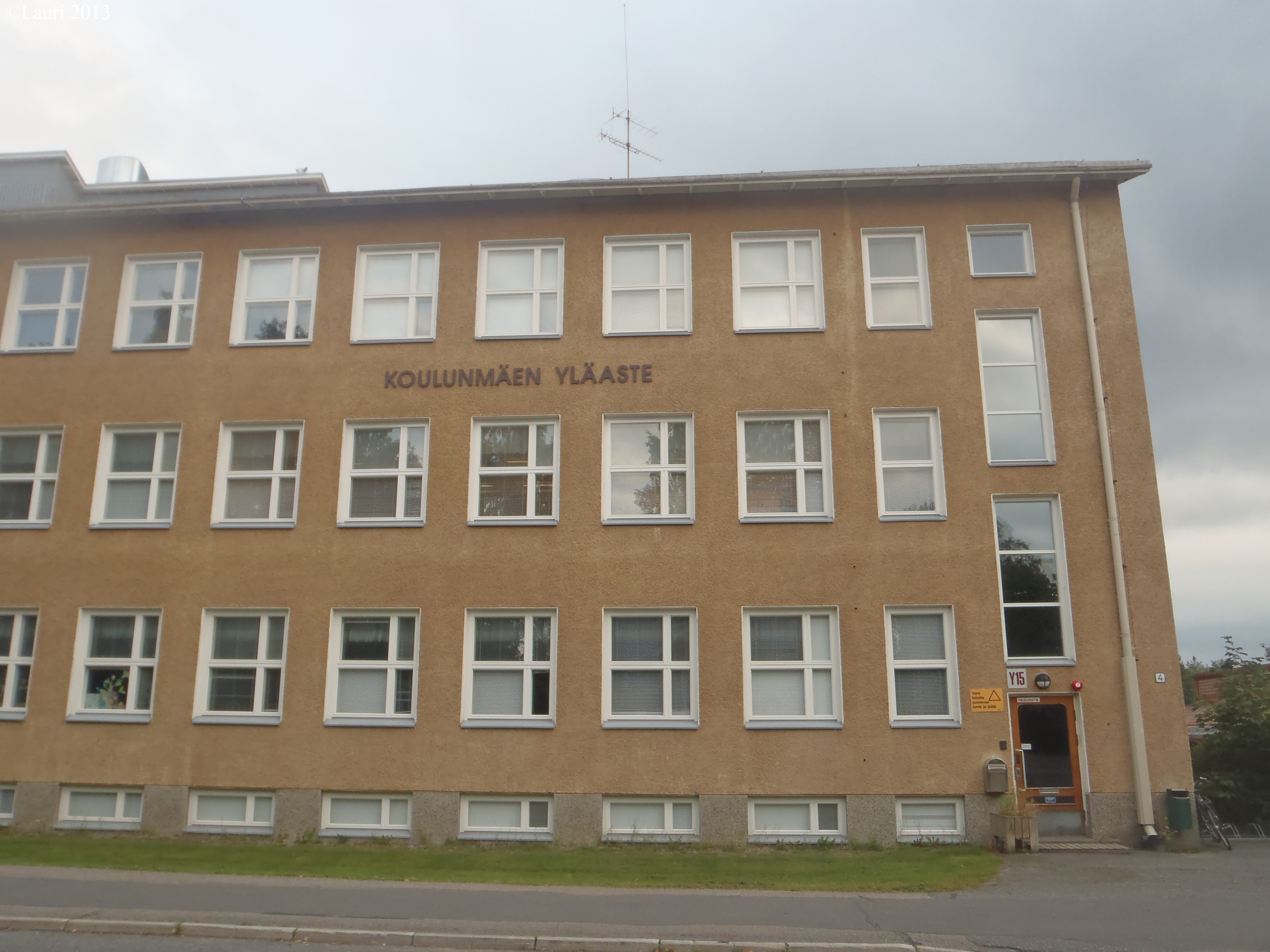
Koulunmäki junior high school at Äänekoski

Högstadium ("high-stadium" or "upper stage") is a Swedish term for the seventh to ninth grade (grundskola) of the Swedish school system. In 1994, it was taken out of official use, but was still used informally. The term was reintroduced when the schools act was amended in 2018. After högstadiet ("the high-stadium"), there is no compulsory school attendance; however, most Swedish students go on to the gymnasium for three more years of studies. The term was also used for grades 7–9 in Finland from the 1970s and up to 1999.

The Norwegian equivalent is "ungdomsskole", covering grades 8–10.
