= Trönninge, Halmstad =

Trönninge
- Location within Halland Location within Sweden
- Coordinates: 56°37′N 12°56′E
- Country: Sweden
- Province: Halland
- County: Halland County
- Municipality: Halmstad Municipality

Area
  - Total: 1.45 km^{2} (0.56 sq mi)

Population (31 December 2020)
  - Total: 1,645
  - Density: 1,130/km^{2} (2,940/sq mi)
- Time zone: UTC+1 (CET)
  - Summer (DST): UTC+2 (CEST)

Trönninge is a locality situated in Halmstad Municipality, Halland County, Sweden, with 1,645 inhabitants in 2020.
