= Hallandstrafiken =

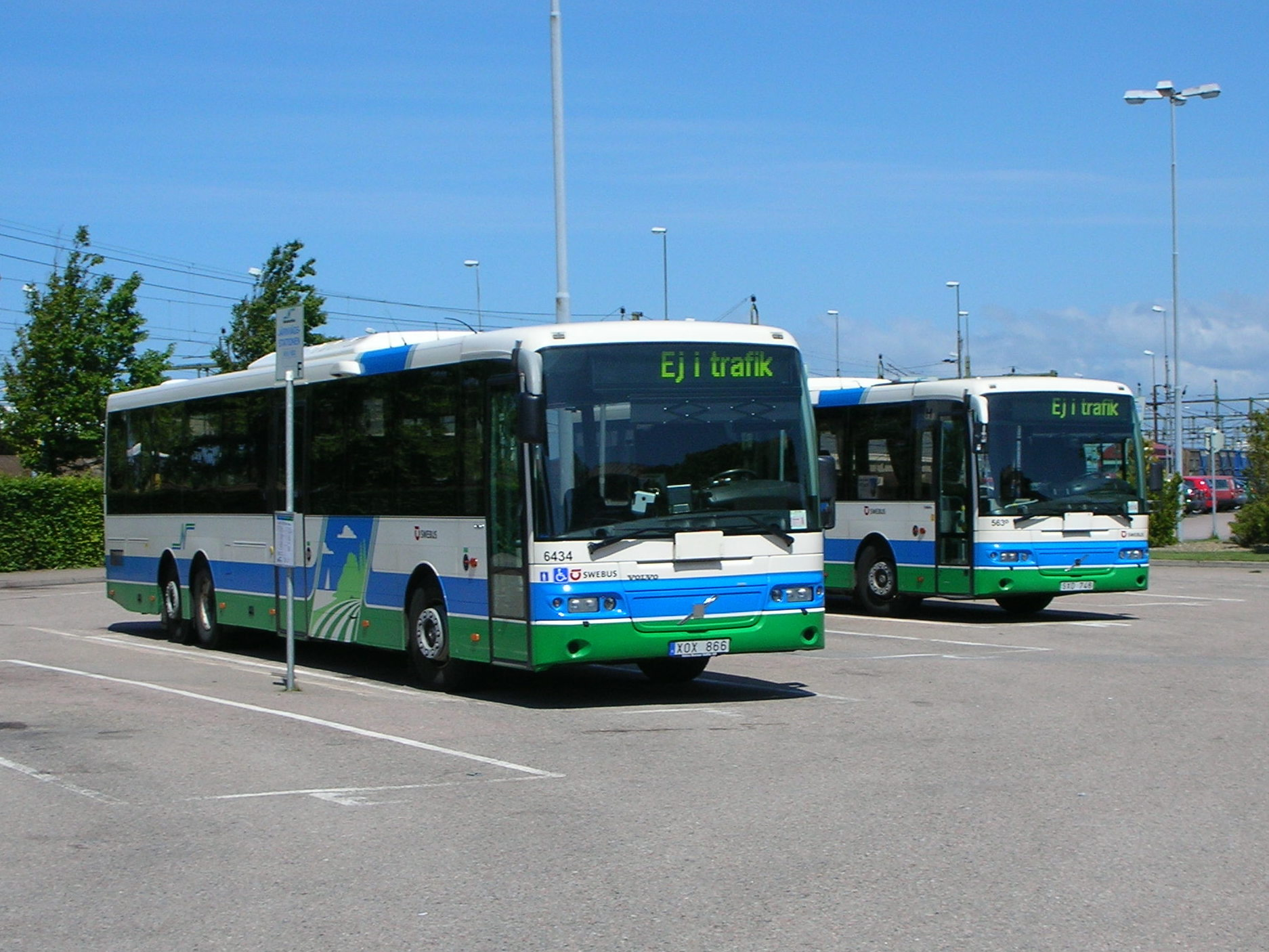
Two buses belonging to Hallandstrafiken in Varberg (in 2009)

Hallandstrafiken is an administration within Region Halland, the regional public transit authority in Halland, Sweden (with the exception of Kungsbacka, where Västtrafik is responsible for public transportation). Its main office is located in Falkenberg.

== History ==
Until the end of 2022 it was a wholly owned company of Region Halland (Hallandstrafiken AB). In 2023 it became an administration under an operating board.

== Traffic ==
=== Buses ===
Hallandstrafiken is responsible for regional traffic in Halland except Kungsbacka, as well as city buses in Halmstad, Falkenberg and Varberg.

=== Trains ===
Halland has commuter trains on three different lines, although none are procured by Hallandstrafiken or run under their brand. These trains are the Øresundståg on the West Coast Line (Gothenburg-Copenhagen), procured by Skånetrafiken with support from Hallandstrafiken, Västtågen on Viskadalsbanan (Varberg-Borås) procured by Tåg i Väst, as well as Krösatågen procured by Jönköpings Länstrafik on the Halmstad-Nässjö railway line. Hallandstrafiken is responsible for selling tickets on all three of these trains within Halland.
