= Frösakull =

- Location within Halland Location within Sweden
- Coordinates: 56°41′N 12°44′E
- Country: Sweden
- Province: Halland
- County: Halland County
- Municipality: Halmstad Municipality

Area
  - Total: 4.13 km^{2} (1.59 sq mi)

Population (31 December 2020)
  - Total: 2,699
  - Density: 654/km^{2} (1,690/sq mi)
- Time zone: UTC+1 (CET)
  - Summer (DST): UTC+2 (CEST)

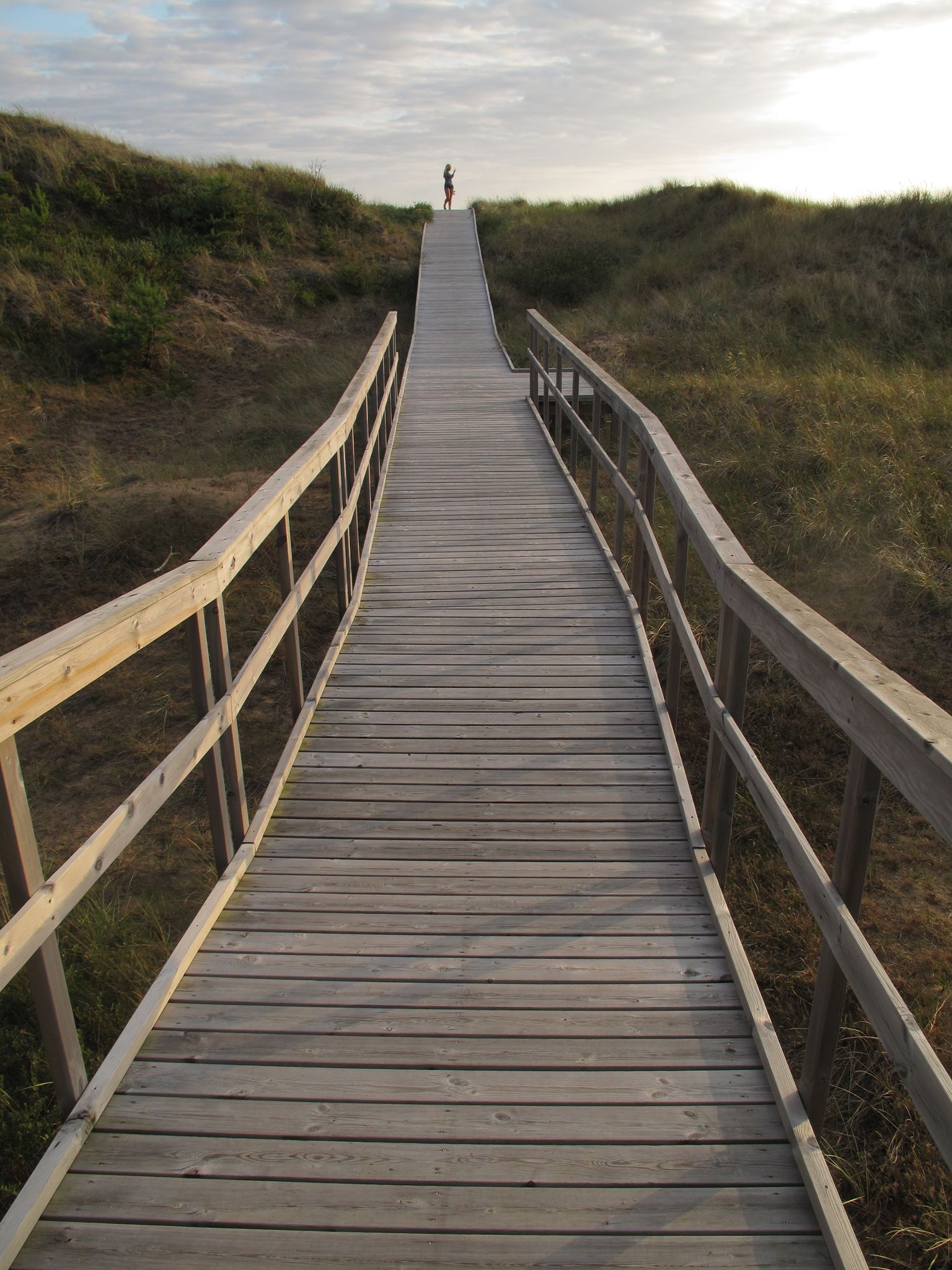
Frösakull Sweden

Frösakull (Swedish pronunciation: [ˈfrø̂ːsaˌkɵl]) is a locality situated in Halmstad Municipality, Halland County, Sweden, with 1,635 inhabitants in 2010, and it's named after the Norse god, Freyr.
