= Sennan, Halmstad =

Sennan
- Location within Halland Location within Sweden
- Coordinates: 56°46′N 12°59′E
- Country: Sweden
- Province: Halland
- County: Halland County
- Municipality: Halmstad Municipality

Area
  - Total: 0.69 km^{2} (0.27 sq mi)

Population (30 December 2020)
  - Total: 370
  - Density: 540/km^{2} (1,400/sq mi)
- Time zone: UTC+1 (CET)
  - Summer (DST): UTC+2 (CEST)

Sennan is a locality situated in Halmstad Municipality, Halland County, Sweden, with 370 inhabitants in 2020.
