= Halmstad Municipality =

Halmstad Municipality Halmstads kommun
- Municipality
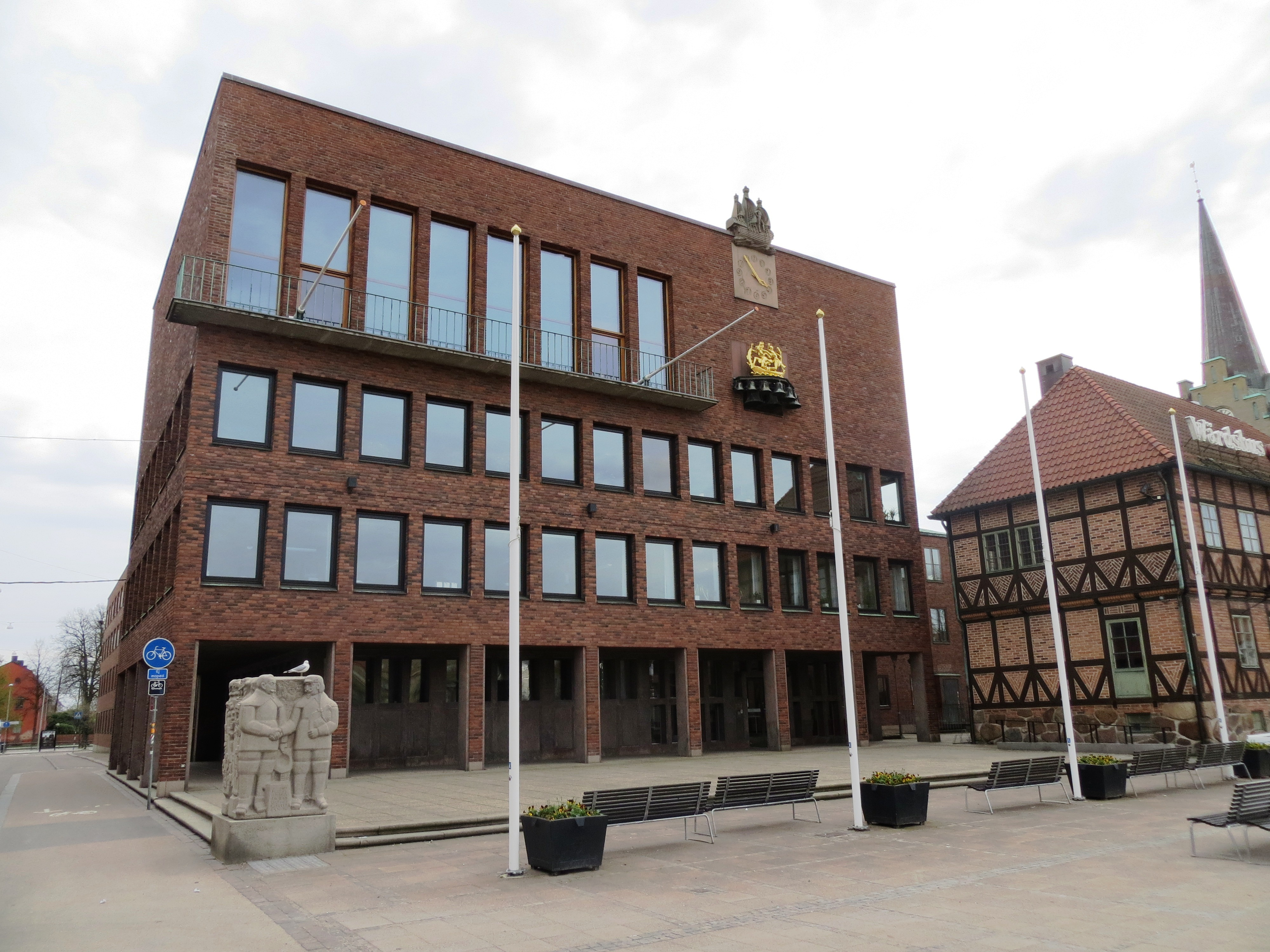
- Halmstad City Hall

- Coat of arms

- Coordinates: 56°40′N 12°51′E
- Country: Sweden
- County: Halland County
- Seat: Halmstad

Government
  - Chairman: Stefan Pålsson (Social Democratic Party)

Area
  - Total: 1,699.89 km^{2} (656.33 sq mi)
  - Land: 1,014.13 km^{2} (391.56 sq mi)
  - Water: 685.76 km^{2} (264.77 sq mi)
- Area as of 1 January 2014.

Population (30 June 2025)
  - Total: 106,075
  - Density: 104.597/km^{2} (270.905/sq mi)
- Time zone: UTC+1 (CET)
  - Summer (DST): UTC+2 (CEST)
- ISO 3166 code: SE
- Province: Halland
- Municipal code: 1380
- Website: www.halmstad.se

Halmstad Municipality (Swedish: Halmstads kommun) is a municipality in Halland County on the Swedish west coast, in which the city Halmstad is the seat.

The 1971 local government reform was implemented gradually in the area. In 1967 the rural municipality Simlångsdalen (created in 1952) was amalgamated into the City of Halmstad. The city was converted into a municipality of unitary type in 1971, but the seven surrounding municipalities were not merged into it until 1974.

== Politics ==
Since the 2022 elections, the municipal government is controlled by a majority consisting of the Social Democrats, Moderates and Christian Democrats, with Social Democrat Stefan Pålsson as chairman of the municipal board.

=== Municipal council ===
The municipal council has 71 seats, with the governing majority holding a majority with 40 seats.

- Left Party (4)
- Social Democrats (22)
- Green Party (2)
- Hjärta för Halmstad (4)
- Halmstads Lokala Parti (2)
- Centre Party (5)
- Liberals (3)
- Moderate Party (13)
- Christian Democrats (5)
- Sweden Democrats (11)

== Localities ==
There are 21 urban areas (also called a tätort or locality) in Halmstad Municipality.

In the table the localities are listed according to the size of the population as of 31 December 2005. The municipal seat is in bold characters.

#	Locality	Population
1	**Halmstad**	55,688
2	Oskarström	4,011
3	Fyllinge	2,830
4	Getinge	1,885
5	Frösakull	1,635
6	Trönninge	1,555
7	Åled	1,536
8	Harplinge	1,454
9	Gullbrandstorp	1,435
10	Haverdal	1,401
11	Kvibille	793
12	Steninge	769
13	Gullbranna	727
14	Eldsberga	717
15	Villshärad	628
16	Simlångsdalen	577
17	Laxvik	469
18	Holm	462
19	Sennan	430
20	Tylösand	387
21	Skedala	355

== Demographics ==
This is a demographic table based on Halmstad Municipality's electoral districts in the 2022 Swedish general election sourced from SVT's election platform, in turn taken from SCB official statistics.

In total there were 104,409 residents, including 79,133 Swedish citizens of voting age. 46.2% voted for the left coalition and 52.6% for the right coalition. Indicators are in percentage points except population totals and income.

Location	Residents	Citizen adults	Left vote	Right vote	Employed	Swedish parents	Foreign heritage	Income SEK	Degree
Location			%	%					
Andersberg N/V	2,394	1,136	67.9	24.5	56	13	87	14,909	28
Andersberg S	2,606	1,573	69.1	23.4	55	18	82	14,043	26
Bäckagård C	1,451	1,066	50.2	48.2	75	73	27	23,578	47
Bäckagård N	1,733	1,280	42.4	57.1	91	89	11	30,587	60
Bäckagård S	1,508	1,153	38.5	60.8	89	94	6	31,609	65
Centrum N	1,232	1,104	42.3	56.3	83	81	19	23,967	46
Centrum S	1,280	1,129	44.8	54.0	82	80	20	26,726	45
Centrum V	1,424	1,227	47.7	50.5	81	72	28	25,647	44
Centrum Ö-Gamletull	1,409	1,153	49.1	48.7	68	73	27	18,682	51
Eldsberga-Tönnersjö	1,483	1,049	39.7	59.6	86	87	13	27,617	35
Engelbrekt V	1,221	987	50.5	47.7	65	74	26	18,084	47
Engelbrekt Ö	1,186	927	42.4	56.3	65	71	29	20,222	39
Frennarp	1,517	1,138	53.5	45.9	89	87	13	29,137	53
Frösakull V-Tylösand	1,274	1,134	20.7	79.0	75	91	9	31,661	55
Frösakull Ö	1,485	1,211	31.2	68.2	83	91	9	30,103	58
Furet	1,623	1,204	48.1	50.9	86	83	17	30,348	49
Fyllinge N/Ö	1,623	1,309	50.8	47.4	82	60	40	27,333	43
Fyllinge S/V	1,725	1,258	55.2	42.7	75	60	40	24,790	34
Galgberget V	1,319	1,113	37.3	62.1	83	79	21	28,705	55
Galgberget Ö	1,527	1,230	46.3	51.3	80	76	24	26,260	47
Gamletull N/Ö	1,620	1,329	48.1	49.2	80	72	28	23,089	45
Gamletull V	1,629	1,454	43.8	55.1	84	84	16	29,237	56
Getinge N	1,382	975	46.5	52.7	81	81	19	25,550	32
Getinge S-Rävinge	1,365	993	47.4	51.5	87	87	13	25,685	35
Gullbrandstorp N	1,458	1,055	41.5	57.7	90	93	7	31,244	54
Gullbrandstorp S	1,480	1,181	40.2	58.8	87	92	8	27,667	54
Gullbranna-Laxvik	1,321	1,051	37.9	61.2	87	88	12	28,394	42
Gustavsfält N	1,341	989	57.3	39.8	74	41	59	23,054	30
Gustavsfält S	1,450	950	59.1	37.4	66	34	66	18,750	32
Harplinge	2,080	1,518	47.4	51.5	88	91	9	28,341	48
Haverdal	1,870	1,571	43.0	56.2	83	92	8	29,203	57
Holm-Vapnö	1,423	916	38.9	60.8	88	86	14	29,207	45
Kattegatt Ö	1,341	1,128	47.0	52.3	80	81	19	28,026	50
Kvibille-Slättåkra	1,753	1,314	39.4	59.3	87	91	9	26,918	40
Kärleken-Sofieberg V	1,696	1,236	46.3	52.7	88	87	13	30,281	54
Kärleken-Sofieberg Ö	1,446	1,099	48.4	50.6	87	86	14	29,206	53
Linehed N	1,508	1,324	52.7	45.6	77	47	53	22,272	37
Linehed S	1,603	1,089	63.6	32.7	56	29	71	15,919	29
Mickedala	1,666	1,272	49.6	49.6	82	87	13	30,951	62
Nyatorp N	1,713	1,348	45.5	52.8	79	72	28	24,985	46
Nyatorp S	1,443	1,124	43.7	54.1	72	64	36	21,400	40
Nyhem S	1,754	1,264	49.2	47.9	57	55	45	13,621	52
Nyhem V	1,752	1,289	53.4	44.8	74	57	43	22,129	40
Nyhem Ö	1,722	1,251	58.8	37.3	58	46	54	16,424	36
Oskarström N	1,603	1,116	46.1	52.3	80	75	25	24,570	28
Oskarström S/V	1,592	1,050	46.2	51.7	73	67	33	21,315	24
Oskarström Ö	1,792	1,322	45.1	54.3	85	83	17	25,927	35
Rotorp N	1,576	1,329	54.3	44.3	75	77	23	26,030	49
Rotorp S-Alet	1,383	1,097	48.7	49.7	83	87	13	29,857	56
Simlångsdalen	1,610	1,234	41.3	58.1	88	90	10	26,287	34
Skedala-Marbäck	1,442	1,154	36.7	62.6	89	90	10	29,346	35
Slottsjord-Kattegatt V	1,253	1,079	46.5	52.2	76	78	22	23,965	48
Snöstorp S/V	1,891	1,385	47.3	52.1	87	74	26	29,402	46
Snöstorp Ö-Brogård	1,630	1,202	49.1	49.7	87	81	19	28,642	46
Stenhuggeriet	1,391	1,108	36.3	63.4	85	91	9	33,849	58
Steninge-Särdal	1,400	1,099	45.6	53.5	87	91	9	30,903	62
Söndrum C	1,343	1,091	39.3	60.2	89	91	9	30,697	58
Söndrum N	1,699	1,245	36.5	63.1	89	90	10	31,322	58
Söndrum S-Eketånga	1,464	1,124	39.4	59.7	87	89	11	32,915	65
Trönninge	1,871	1,356	40.2	58.5	85	83	17	28,171	38
Vallås N	1,672	1,309	57.7	39.7	72	61	39	19,496	36
Vallås S	1,571	1,157	58.5	40.5	71	54	46	20,129	34
Vallås V	1,724	1,186	61.3	34.8	56	48	52	16,381	25
Vallås Ö	1,678	1,289	54.0	44.6	79	67	33	24,257	39
Åled V	1,396	1,007	43.8	55.6	88	90	10	28,927	40
Åled Ö-Sennan	1,292	970	40.4	59.0	84	86	14	25,776	36
Östra Förstaden	1,300	1,123	46.1	52.4	79	78	22	25,674	50
Source: SVT

== Twin towns – sister cities ==
Halmstad is twinned with:

- Gentofte, Denmark
- Hanko, Finland
- Nikopol, Ukraine
- Stord, Norway

In addition to its twin towns, Halmstad Municipality also cooperates with Asti in Italy and Moshi in Tanzania.

== See also ==
- University College of Halmstad
- Hallandsposten
- Swedish Army
- Swedish Air Force
