= 1990 Swedish Golf Tour =

Golf tour season

1990 Swedish Golf Tour season
- Duration: 17 May 1990 – 23 September 1990
- Number of official events: 14
- Order of Merit: (Sweden) Mikael Högberg

The 1990 Swedish Golf Tour was the seventh season of the Swedish Golf Tour, the main professional golf tour in Sweden since it was formed in 1984, with most tournaments being incorporated into the Challenge Tour between 1989 and 1998.

== Schedule ==
The following table lists official events during the 1990 season.

Date	Tournament	Location	Purse (SKr)	Winner (Note: The number in brackets after each winner's name is the number of Swedish Golf Tour events they had won up to and including that tournament. As most Swedish Golf Tour events are incorporated into the Challenge Tour schedules, details of these wins are displayed there instead.)	Main tour (Note: CHA − Challenge Tour.)
20 May	Ramlösa Open	Västergötland	350,000	(Sweden) Carl-Magnus Strömberg	CHA
27 May	Jede Hot Cup Open	Västergötland	250,000	(Sweden) Peter Hedblom	CHA
3 Jun	FLA Open	Skåne	300,000	(Sweden) Olle Nordberg	CHA
17 Jun	Stiga Open	Småland	300,000	(Sweden) Mats Hallberg	CHA
1 Jul	Viking Open	Västergötland	250,000	(Sweden) Peter Carsbo	CHA
8 Jul	Wermland Open	Värmland	525,000	(Sweden) Joakim Haeggman	CHA
15 Jul	Scandinavian Tipo Trophy	Finland	300,000	(Sweden) Fredrik Lindgren	CHA
22 Jul	SM Match Play	Uppland	250,000	(Republic of Ireland) Eoghan O'Connell	CHA
12 Aug	Gevalia Open	Gästrikland	400,000	(Argentina) José Cantero	CHA
19 Aug	Teleannons Grand Prix	Skåne	415,000	(Sweden) Mikael Högberg	CHA
26 Aug	Länsförsäkringar Open	Halland	600,000	(Sweden) Adam Mednick	CHA
9 Sep	Västerås Open	Västmanland	500,000	(Sweden) Vilhelm Forsbrand	CHA
16 Sep	SI Compaq Open	Närke	500,000	(Sweden) Jesper Parnevik	CHA
23 Sep	Esab Open	Halland	300,000	(Argentina) Ricardo González	CHA

== Order of Merit ==
The Order of Merit was based on prize money won during the season, calculated in Swedish krona.

Position	Player	Prize money (SKr)
1	(Sweden) Mikael Högberg	221,700
2	(Sweden) Adam Mednick	148,000
3	(Sweden) Vilhelm Forsbrand	145,100
4	(Sweden) John Lindberg	133,150
5	(Argentina) José Cantero	133,050

== See also ==
- 1990 Swedish Golf Tour (women)
