= 1991 Swedish Golf Tour =

Golf tour season

1991 Swedish Golf Tour season
- Duration: 16 May 1991 – 22 September 1991
- Number of official events: 14
- Order of Merit: (Sweden) Mats Hallberg

The 1991 Swedish Golf Tour was the eighth season of the Swedish Golf Tour, the main professional golf tour in Sweden since it was formed in 1984, with most tournaments being incorporated into the Challenge Tour between 1989 and 1998.

== Schedule ==
The following table lists official events during the 1991 season.

Date	Tournament	Location	Purse (SKr)	Winner (Note: The number in brackets after each winner's name is the number of Swedish Golf Tour events they had won up to and including that tournament. As most Swedish Golf Tour events are incorporated into the Challenge Tour schedules, details of these wins are displayed there instead.)	Main tour (Note: CHA − Challenge Tour.)
19 May	Ramlösa Open	Västergötland	350,000	(Sweden) Fredrik Larsson	CHA
26 May	SIAB Open	Skåne	350,000	(England) Jon Evans	CHA
2 Jun	Jede Hot Cup Open	Västergötland	250,000	(Sweden) Mats Hallberg	CHA
9 Jun	Teleannons Grand Prix	Södermanland	450,000	(Sweden) Jan Tilmanis	CHA
16 Jun	Stiga Open	Småland	330,000	(Sweden) Mats Hallberg	CHA
23 Jun	Formula Micro Danish Open	Denmark	350,000	(Sweden) Peter Hedblom	CHA
14 Jul	Volvo Finnish Open	Finland	330,000	(Sweden) Fredrik Larsson	CHA
21 Jul	SM Match Play	Södermanland	400,000	(Sweden) Mathias Grönberg	CHA
11 Aug	Länsförsäkringar Open	Halland	600,000	(Sweden) Johan Ryström	CHA
18 Aug	Gefle Open	Gästrikland	350,000	(Sweden) Mats Lanner	CHA
1 Sep	SI Compaq Open	Närke	1,000,000	(England) Jonathan Sewell	CHA
8 Sep	Västerås Open	Västmanland	350,000	(Sweden) Vilhelm Forsbrand	CHA
15 Sep	Upsala Golf International	Uppland	200,000	(Sweden) Peter Hedblom	CHA
22 Sep	Viking Open	Västergötland	250,000	(Argentina) José Cantero	CHA

== Order of Merit ==
The Order of Merit was based on prize money won during the season, calculated in Swedish krona.

Position	Player	Prize money (SKr)
1	(Sweden) Mats Hallberg	208,391
2	(Sweden) Mathias Grönberg	191,079
3	(England) Jonathan Sewell	166,600
4	(Sweden) Magnus Jönsson	152,204
5	(Sweden) Pierre Fulke	143,978

== See also ==
- 1991 Swedish Golf Tour (women)
