= 1992 Swedish Golf Tour =

Golf tour season

1992 Swedish Golf Tour season
- Duration: 21 May 1992 – 13 September 1992
- Number of official events: 9
- Order of Merit: (Sweden) Joakim Haeggman

The 1992 Swedish Golf Tour was the ninth season of the Swedish Golf Tour, the main professional golf tour in Sweden since it was formed in 1984, with most tournaments being incorporated into the Challenge Tour between 1989 and 1998.

== Schedule ==
The following table lists official events during the 1992 season.

Date	Tournament	Location	Purse (SKr)	Winner (Note: The number in brackets after each winner's name is the number of Swedish Golf Tour events they had won up to and including that tournament. As most Swedish Golf Tour events are incorporated into the Challenge Tour schedules, details of these wins are displayed there instead.)	Main tour (Note: CHA − Challenge Tour.)
24 May	Ramlösa Open	Västergötland	400,000	(Sweden) Magnus Jönsson	CHA
31 May	SIAB Open	Skåne	350,000	(Sweden) Mikael Krantz	CHA
14 Jun	Stiga Open	Småland	350,000	(Sweden) Pierre Fulke	CHA
12 Jul	Volvo Finnish Open	Finland	350,000	(Sweden) Henrik Bergqvist	CHA
9 Aug	SI Compaq Open	Närke	800,000	(Sweden) Joakim Haeggman	CHA
16 Aug	Länsförsäkringar Open	Halland	525,000	(England) Steven Bottomley	CHA
23 Aug	SM Match Play	Västergötland	300,000	(Argentina) José Cantero	CHA
30 Aug	Västerås Open	Västmanland	225,000	(Sweden) Joakim Rask	CHA
13 Sep	Upsala Golf International	Uppland	300,000	(Sweden) Tony Edlund	CHA

== Order of Merit ==
The Order of Merit was based on prize money won during the season, calculated in Swedish krona.

Position	Player	Prize money (SKr)
1	(Sweden) Joakim Haeggman	132,280
2	(Sweden) Per-Ive Persson	118,099
3	(Sweden) Pierre Fulke	92,170
4	(Sweden) Vilhelm Forsbrand	92,063
5	(England) Steven Bottomley	92,025

== See also ==
- 1992 Swedish Golf Tour (women)
