= 1994 Swedish Golf Tour =

Golf tour season

1994 Swedish Golf Tour season
- Duration: 26 May 1994 – 25 September 1994
- Number of official events: 13
- Order of Merit: (Sweden) Mats Hallberg

The 1994 Swedish Golf Tour, titled as the 1994 Scandinavian Golf Tour, was the 11th season of the Swedish Golf Tour, the main professional golf tour in Sweden since it was formed in 1984, with most tournaments being incorporated into the Challenge Tour between 1989 and 1998.

== Schedule ==
The following table lists official events during the 1994 season.

Date	Tournament	Location	Purse (SKr)	Winner (Note: The number in brackets after each winner's name is the number of Swedish Golf Tour events they had won up to and including that tournament. As most Swedish Golf Tour events are incorporated into the Challenge Tour schedules, details of these wins are displayed there instead.)	Main tour (Note: CHA − Challenge Tour.)
29 May	Ramlösa Open	Västergötland	315,000	(Sweden) Eric Carlberg (a)	CHA
5 Jun	SIAB Open	Skåne	350,000	(Norway) Per Haugsrud	CHA
12 Jun	Himmerland Open	Denmark	360,000	(England) Michael Archer	CHA
19 Jun	Husqvarna Open	Småland	150,000	(Sweden) Anders Haglund (1)	
3 Jul	Västerås Open	Västmanland	315,000	(Sweden) Joakim Grönhagen	CHA
10 Jul	Volvo Finnish Open	Finland	350,000	(Finland) Mikael Piltz	CHA
24 Jul	Jämtland Open	Jämtland	315,000	(Sweden) Daniel Chopra	CHA
7 Aug	SM Match Play	Uppland	315,000	(Sweden) Per Nyman	CHA
21 Aug	Karsten Ping Norwegian Challenge	Norway	700,000	(Northern Ireland) Raymond Burns	CHA
28 Aug	Toyota Danish PGA Championship	Denmark	360,000	(Sweden) Anders Överbring	CHA
4 Sep	Compaq Open	Skåne	315,000	(Sweden) Adam Mednick	CHA
18 Sep	Borås Open	Västergötland	150,000	(Sweden) Fredrik Plahn (1)	
25 Sep	Team Erhverv Danish Open	Denmark	630,000	(England) Liam White	CHA

== Order of Merit ==
The Order of Merit was based on prize money won during the season, calculated in Swedish krona.

Position	Player	Prize money (SKr)
1	(Sweden) Mats Hallberg	180,002
2	(Sweden) Joakim Grönhagen	134,914
3	(Sweden) Per Nyman	131,287
4	(Norway) Per Haugsrud	94,340
5	(Finland) Mikael Piltz	80,826

== See also ==
- 1994 Swedish Golf Tour (women)
