= Audi Quattro Trophy =

Tournament information
- Location: Bad Abbach, Germany
- Established: 1989
- Course: Golf Club Bad Abbach
- Par: 72
- Tour: Challenge Tour
- Format: Stroke play
- Prize fund: £55,000
- Month played: July
- Final year: 1998

Tournament record score
- Aggregate: 267 Michael Campbell (1994)
- To par: −21 as above

Final champion
- (Italy) Marcello Santi
- Location in Germany Location in Bavaria

The Audi Quattro Trophy was a golf tournament on the Challenge Tour. It was played from 1989 to 1998 in Germany.

== Winners ==
Year	Winner	Score	To par	Margin of victory	Runner(s)-up	Venue	Ref.
1998	(Italy) Marcello Santi	269	−19	Playoff	(Scotland) Stephen Gallacher	Bad Abbach	
1997	(England) David A. Russell	279	−5	Playoff	(Australia) Greg Chalmers	Berlin	
1996	(Germany) Erol Şimşek	268	−20	6 strokes	(England) Paul Simpson	München	
1995	(Netherlands) Joost Steenkamer	268	−20	1 stroke	(Spain) Diego Borrego	Eschenried	
1994	(New Zealand) Michael Campbell	267	−21	2 strokes	(Northern Ireland) Raymond Burns	Eschenried	
1993	(England) Jonathan Lomas	272	−16	6 strokes	(France) Olivier Edmond (Sweden) Jarmo Sandelin	Starnberg	
1992	(Sweden) Pierre Fulke	270	−18	1 stroke	(France) Michel Besanceney (Sweden) Anders Gillner	München West	
1991	(Germany) Alex Čejka				(England) Glyn Krause (England) John Oates	Starnberg	
1990	(England) Nick Godin	274	−14	1 stroke	(England) Stephen Chadwick	Starnberg	
1989	(Republic of Ireland) John O'Flynn						

== See also ==
- Audi Open
