= Mikael Högberg =

Swedish professional golfer

Personal information
- Nationality: Sweden
- Born: 4 October 1960 (age 66) Eskilstuna, Sweden

Career
- Sport: Golf
- Turned professional: 1986
- Former tour: European Tour (joined 1991)
- Professional wins: 2

Number of wins by tour
- Challenge Tour: 1
- Other: 1

Achievements and awards
- Swedish Golf Tour Order of Merit winner: 1990

Mikael Högberg (born 4 October 1960) is a retired Swedish professional golfer. He won the Swedish Golf Tour Order of Merit in 1990 and joined the European Tour in 1991.

== Amateur career ==
Högberg finished fourth at the 1982 European Youths' Team Championship and won the 1983 Swedish International Stroke Play Championship. He represented Sweden at the 1984 Eisenhower Trophy and finished 8th together with Carl-Magnus Strömberg and Jesper Parnevik. He represented the Continent of Europe at the 1984 St Andrews Trophy at Saunton Golf Club with a team that included Fredrik Lindgren and José María Olazábal.

== Professional career ==
Högberg turned professional in 1986 and joined the Swedish Golf Tour. In his first season, he won the Esab Open and finished T9 in the Scandinavian Enterprise Open, a European Tour event.

In 1990, he won the Teleannons Grand Prix on the nascent Challenge Tour, and he won the 1990 Swedish Golf Tour Order of Merit.

Högberg joined the European Tour in 1991, where he made 9 cuts in 17 starts and finished 142nd in the rankings.

== Amateur wins ==
- 1983 Swedish International Stroke Play Championship

== Professional wins (2) ==
=== Challenge Tour wins (1) ===
No.	Date	Tournament	Winning score	Margin of victory	Runner-up
1	19 Aug 1990	Teleannons Grand Prix	−11 (73-64-68=205)	1 stroke	(Argentina) José Cantero

Challenge Tour playoff record (0–1)

No.	Year	Tournament	Opponent	Result
1	1990	FLA Open	(Sweden) Olle Nordberg	Lost to birdie on first extra hole

=== Swedish Golf Tour wins (1) ===
No.	Date	Tournament	Winning score	Margin of victory	Runners-up
1	21 Sep 1986	Esab Open	E (71-70-72=213)	Playoff	(Sweden) Johan Ryström, (Sweden) Ove Sellberg

== Team appearances ==
Amateur

- European Youths' Team Championship (representing Sweden): 1982
- Eisenhower Trophy (representing Sweden): 1984
- St Andrews Trophy (representing the Continent of Europe): 1984
