= Fredrik Larsson =

Fredrik Larsson may refer to:

- Fredrik Larsson (racing driver) (born 1976), Swedish racing driver
- Fredrik Larsson (golfer) (born 1968), Swedish golfer
- Fredrik Larsson (born 1974), bassist for Swedish heavy metal band HammerFall
