= Tournoi Perrier de Paris =

Tournoi Perrier de Paris may refer to either of the following golf tournaments:

- Tournoi Perrier de Paris (Challenge Tour), a tournament on the Challenge Tour in 1993
- Tournoi Perrier de Paris (European Tour), an unofficial money tournament on the European Tour between 1994 and 1998
