= Perrier European Pro-Am =

Former golf tournament in Belgium

Tournament information
- Location: Lasne, Belgium
- Established: 1990
- Course: Royal Waterloo Golf Club
- Par: 72
- Tour: Challenge Tour
- Format: Stroke play
- Prize fund: £65,000
- Month played: September
- Final year: 1997

Tournament record score
- Aggregate: 271 Craig Hainline (1997)
- To par: −17 as above

Final champion
- (United States) Craig Hainline
- Location in Belgium

The Perrier European Pro-Am was a golf tournament on the Challenge Tour that was played annually in Belgium from 1990 to 1997.

== Winners ==
Year	Winner	Score	To par	Margin of victory	Runner(s)-up	Venue
Perrier European Pro-Am
1997	(United States) Craig Hainline	271	−17	1 stroke	(Australia) Stephen Leaney	Royal Waterloo
1996	(United States) Kevin Carissimi	277	−11	Playoff	(Spain) Jesús María Arruti	Royal Waterloo
1995	(Spain) Diego Borrego	279	−9	1 stroke	(England) Jonathan Lomas	Royal Waterloo d'Hulencourt
1994	(England) Andrew Sandywell	203	−13	3 strokes	(Spain) Diego Borrego	Royal Bercuit
1993	(England) Chris Platts	204	−12	2 strokes	(Sweden) Dennis Edlund	Brussels
Perrier European Pro-Am
1992	(Sweden) Magnus Persson	213	−3	2 strokes	(Sweden) Mathias Grönberg	Brussels
Perrier Belgian Pro-Am
1991	(England) George Ryall	210	−6	1 stroke	(England) Paul Way	Bercuit; Royal Waterloo; Louvain-La-Neuve
Brussels Pro-Am
1990	(England) Philip Golding	212	−4		(France) Tim Planchin	Brussels
