= Czech Charity Challenge =

Golf tournament

Tournament information
- Location: Marienbad, Bohemia (now Czech Republic)
- Established: 1992
- Course: Mariánské Lázně Golf Club
- Par: 72
- Tour: Challenge Tour
- Format: Stroke play
- Prize fund: £55,000
- Month played: July/August
- Final year: 1993

Tournament record score
- Aggregate: 275 Ian Spencer (1993)
- To par: −13 as above

Final champion
- (England) Ian Spencer

Location map
- Location in the Czech Republic

The Czech Charity Challenge was a golf tournament on the Challenge Tour held in Bohemia (now part of the Czech Republic). It was played at Mariánské Lázně Golf Club in Marienbad, the oldest course in the country, opened in 1905. The tournament was succeeded by the Czech Open, a European Tour event held at the same venue from 1994 to 1996.

== Winners ==
Year	Winner	Score	To par	Margin of victory	Runner-up	Ref.
Corfin Charity Challenge
1993	(England) Ian Spencer	275	−13	4 strokes	(Sweden) Klas Eriksson	
Playboy Charity Challenge
1992	(Australia) Lucien Tinkler	210	−6	Playoff	(Republic of Ireland) Paul McGinley	

== See also ==
- Czech Open
- D+D Real Czech Challenge
