= Kungsbacka Golf Club =

Golf club in Kungsbacka, Sweden

Coordinates: 57.494°N 11.986°E

- Location in Halland County, Sweden Kungsbacka GC (Sweden)

Club information
- Location: Särö, Kungsbacka Municipality, Halland County, Sweden
- Established: 1971; 1974 (SGF Member); 1974 (13 holes opened); 1978 (18 holes opened); 1992 (27 holes opened); 2002 (36 holes opened)
- Type: Private
- Total holes: 36
- Website: kungsbackagk.se

Old Course (18 holes)
- Designed by: Frank Pennink; Ulf Davidsson
- Par: 72
- Length: 6,237 m
- Course record: Tee 62: 63 Marcus Palm; Tee 54: 66 Chiara Tamburlini

New Course (9 holes)
- Designed by: Tommy Nordström
- Par: 36
- Length: 2,990 m

Short Course (9 holes)
- Designed by: Tommy Nordström
- Par: 27
- Length: 910 m

Kungsbacka Golf Club is a golf club located in Särö, Kungsbacka Municipality, 30 km south of Gothenburg in Sweden.

== History ==
=== Foundation and development ===
Initiator to the official foundation of the club in December 1971^{1} was Bertil Emanuelsson. After demand from the owner of the land area, Särö municipality, a first sketch of the planned course was made by Eric Röhss in 1970. The club was elected member of the Swedish Golf Federation in 1974 as its 140th member club and the first golf club in Kungsbacka Municipality. Despite location of its facilities in Halland County, 7 kilometers west of Kungsbacka city center and 30 kilometers south of Gothenburg, the club became a member of the Golf District Federation of Gothenburg. In April 1974, a newly built driving range was ready for use.

The club logo was designed in 1973 by Ulf Davidsson. The oak leafs around the golf ball in the logo were inspired by the many oaks around the course and in the club house area at the time.

A 13-hole-course was ready for play in autumn 1974 and two years later there were more than 500 members in the club. When the 18-hole-course opened in 1978, the number of members had reached 714. A new club house was inaugurated in 1980 and by that time, with only one 18-hole-course available, a que system was established for new member applications.

By 2003 the number of members had risen to 1,662. During 2024 and 2025, an extensive renovation of the clubhouse was carried out. As of 2026 there were more than 2,300 members in the club, with different forms av membership available.

View from the clubhouse to the practice green and, in the background, the par 3 18th hole on the Old course at Kungsbacka GC

View from the tee at the par 5 sixth hole at the Old Course at Kungsbacka Golf Club

=== Chairpersons ===
1971–1972	Gösta Svensson
1973–1976	Lars M. Corin
1977–1980	Håkan Aldeby
1981	Bengt Arne Magnusson
1982–1985	Christer Engdahl
1986–1989	Christer Wallén
1990–1992	Thure Sandén
1993–1996	Christer Wallén
1997–1999	Milton Jonsson
2000–2004^{2}	Bengt Löfqvist
2004–2005	Christer Wallén
2006–2020	Bengt Magnusson
2021–	Måns Palmgren

=== Head professionals ===
1974–1977	Michael Howlin
1977–1982	Stanley Grant
1983–1985	Gösta Ignell
1986–2018	Per Nellbeck
2019–	Per Ola Dahlman

Notes:
* ^{1} Initial meeting was held 13 September 1970, when an interim board was formed, with Claes Turitz as its chairperson. Formal establishment of the club was decided 18 December 1971.
* ^{2} The board resigned 25 May 2004 and a new chairperson entered 5 July 2004.

== Courses ==
=== Old Course ===
The 18-hole-course, called the Old Course, was originally, as a 13-hole-course, designed by golf course architect Frank Pennink. Later renovations were designed by Peter Chamberlain. When the course was expanded in 1978, the five new holes came to be number 7, 8, 9, 10 and 11 on the 18-hole-stretch. The new holes were designed by Ulf Davidsson. The course varies between holes in a flat park landscape (holes 1-5), long and usually windy seaside holes (holes 6-11) and short tricky holes trough the woods (holes 12-18) In 2020, the 18-hole-course was ranked as the 35th best golf course in Sweden by Svensk Golf magazine.

==== Scorecard ====
Hole	1	2	3	4	5	6	7	8	9	Out	10	11	12	13	14	15	16	17	18	In	Total
Meters	137	368	538	318	410	533	190	402	400	3,296	358	428	502	124	260	252	508	357	152	2,941	6,237
Par	3	4	5	4	4	5	3	4	4	36	4	4	5	3	4	4	5	4	4	36	72

The green on the par 3 13th hole, from above right, on the Old course at Kungsbacka Golf Club

Lenghts from diffent tees:^{3}

- 62: 6,237 meters
- 59: 5,914 meters
- 54: 5,412 meters
- 50: 5,009 meters
- 45: 4,481 meters

Note:
* ^{3} Different tees are neither named as mens/ladies nor in colors, but in hectometers, in purpose to encourage players to choose tees suitable for their playing level.

=== New Course ===
In 1992, a 9-hole-course, with par 36, called the New Course, stretching through the woods and designed by Tommy Nordström, was added. With the building of The New Course, a new driving range had to be shaped around 200 meters distance from the club house area, instead of the old range situated in the area were the first hole of the New Course was placed.

=== Shorthole Course ===
In the late 1980s, five short holes, for practice pupose, were laid close to the club house area. Extension to nine short holes were designed by Tommy Nordström in 1991. In 2002, the extended shorthole course with a renewed 910 meter long stretch was inaugurated, with nine par 3-holes, each 80 to 125 meters and with greens, bunkers and penalty areas built with the same qualty demands as on the other courses at the club.

Golf bags of Johan Edfors and Freddie Jacobson at a charity event at Kungsbacka GC in 2018

== Famous players ==
PGA Tour winner and European Tour winner Freddie Jacobson as well as European Tour winner and European Senior Tour winner Johan Edfors started their careers in Kungsbacka Golf Club. Both of them represented the club during the main part of their respective careers and Jacobson continued to do so, while playing as a senior on the PGA Tour Champions.

LPGA Tour winner, Ladies European Tour winner, Solheim Cup player and Women's British Open champion Sophie Gustafson came at young age in her golf career to Kungsbacka Golf Club from small neighbur club Särö Golf Club and continued to represent Kungsbacka trough her career.

== Tournaments hosted ==
=== Professional tournaments ===
Year	Tour	Men (M) / Women (W)	Tournament	Winner	Ref.
1987	SWE	M	Esab Open	(Sweden) Mikael Karlsson	
1988	SWE	M	Esab Open	(Sweden) Ove Sellberg	
1989	CHA	M	Esab Open	(Sweden) Carl-Magnus Strömberg	
1990	CHA	M	Esab Open	(Argentina) Ricardo González	
1997	SWE	M	Tor Line Open	(Sweden) Fredrik Forsvall	
1998	SWE	M	Tor Line Open	(Sweden) Johan Bjerhag	
1999	NGL	M	DFDS Tor Line Open	(Sweden) Patrik Gottfridsson	
2000	NGL	M	DFDS Tor Line Open	(Sweden) Linus Pettersson (a)	
2009	NGL	M	Fredrik Jacobson Masters Powered by Telenor	(Sweden) Jonas Enander-Hedin	
2009	SGT	W	Fredrik Jacobson Masters Powered by Telenor	(Sweden) Nina Reis	
2012	NGL	M	Nordea Tour Championship by Fredrik Jacobson	(Sweden) Johan Carlsson	
2012	SGT	W	Nordea Tour Championship by Fredrik Jacobson	(Sweden) Isabella Ramsay	
2021	NGL	M	Göteborg Open	(Sweden) Jonathan Ågren	
2022	LETAS	W	Göteborg Ladies Open	(France) Nastasia Nadaud (a)	
2023	LETAS	W	PGA Championship Gothenburg	(Switzerland) Chiara Tamburlini	

=== Amateur tournaments ===
Year	Men (M) / Women (W)	Tournament	Winner	Ref.
1981	M	Scandinavian Foursome	(Sweden) Ove Sellberg / (Sweden) Anders Forsbrand	
1981	W	Scandinavian Foursome	(Sweden) Ann Frössling / (Sweden) Helena Mörse	

== See also ==
- List of golf courses in Sweden
