= Open Ribera de Duero =

Tournament information
- Location: Burgos, Spain
- Established: 1993
- Course: Lerma Golf Club
- Par: 72
- Tour: Challenge Tour
- Format: Stroke play
- Prize fund: £30,000
- Month played: July/August
- Final year: 1993

Tournament record score
- Aggregate: 283 José Salgado (1993)
- To par: −5 as above

Final champion
- (Spain) José Salgado
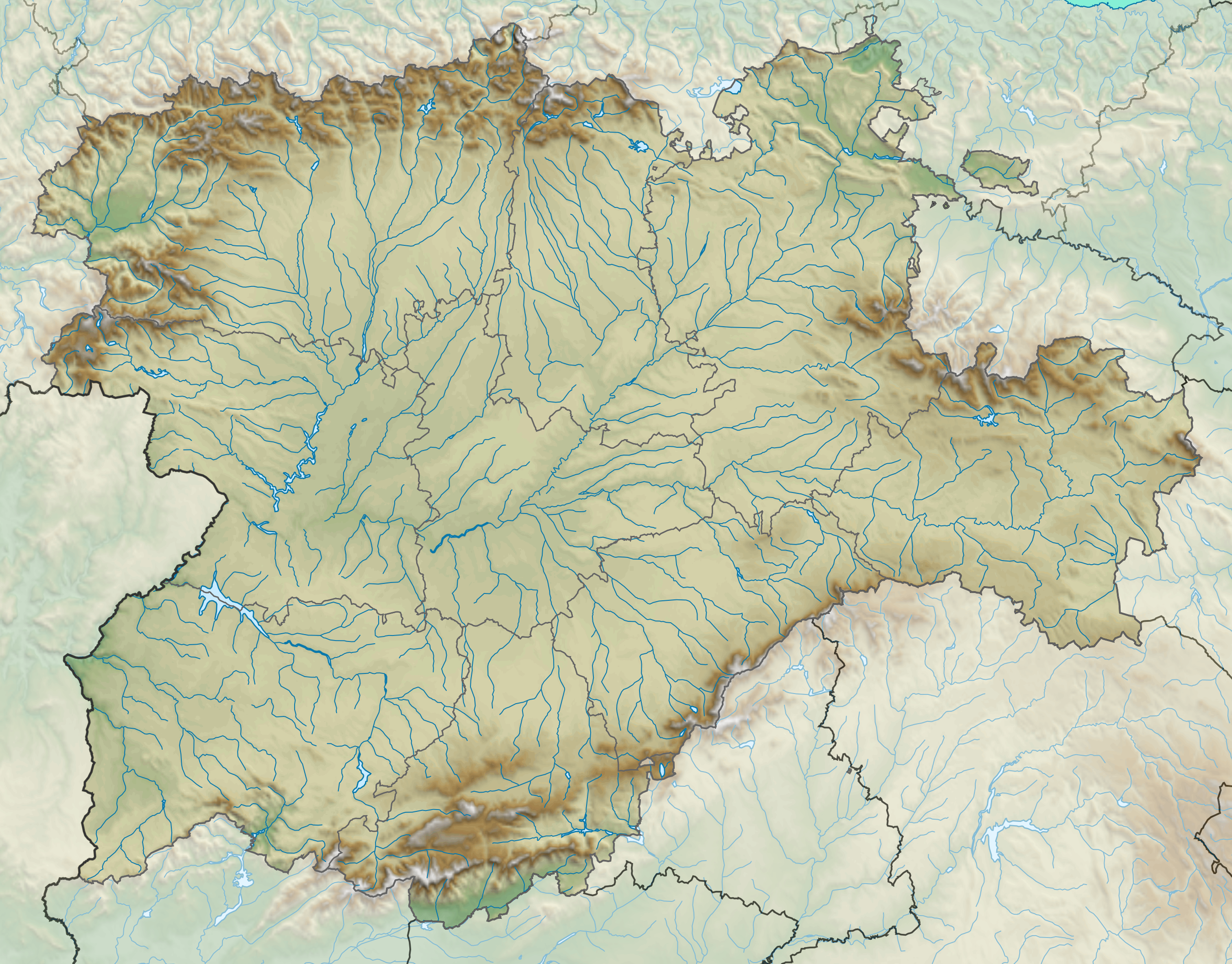
- Location in Spain Location in Castile and León

The Open Ribera de Duero was a golf tournament on the Challenge Tour, played in Spain. It was held in 1993 at Lerma Golf Club in Madrid.

== Winners ==
Year	Winner	Score	To par	Margin of victory	Runner-up	Ref.
1993	(Spain) José Salgado	283	−5	2 strokes	(England) Andy Rogers	
