= Open de Dijon =

Annual professional golf tournament in France

Tournament information
- Location: Bourgogne, France
- Established: 1991
- Course: Golf de Dijon Bourgogne
- Par: 72
- Tour: Challenge Tour
- Format: Stroke play
- Prize fund: £45,000
- Month played: May
- Final year: 1996

Tournament record score
- Aggregate: 277 Tim Planchin
- To par: −11 as above

Final champion
- (Spain) Francisco Cea

Location map
- Location in France

The Open de Dijon was an annual professional golf tournament held at Golf de Dijon Bourgogne, near Bourgogne, France.

The tournament became part of the second tier Challenge Tour schedule in 1991, where it remained until 1996.

== Winners ==
Year	Winner	Score	To par	Margin of victory	Runner(s)-up	Ref.
Open de Dijon
1996	(Spain) Francisco Cea	132	−12	3 strokes	(Italy) Massimo Florioli	
Open de Dijon Bourgogne
1995	(France) Tim Planchin	277	−11	Playoff	(England) Matthew McGuire	
1994	(Italy) Marcello Santi	279	−9	2 strokes	(England) Michael Archer (England) Ian Garbutt	
1993	(Sweden) Niclas Fasth	278	−10	1 stroke	(France) Frédéric Regard	
1992	(England) Jeremy Robinson	280	−8	1 stroke	(United States) Charles Raulerson	
1991	(Sweden) Mikael Krantz	281	−7		(France) Thomas Levet	
