= 1998 Volvo PGA Championship =

Tournament information
- Dates: 22–25 May 1998
- Location: Virginia Water, Surrey, England; 51.40°N 0.59°W
- Courses: Wentworth Club; West Course
- Tour: European Tour

Statistics
- Par: 72
- Field: 156 players, 65 after cut
- Cut: 143 (−1)
- Prize fund: €1,200,000
- Winner's share: €280,000

Champion
- (Scotland) Colin Montgomerie
- 274 (−14)

Location map
- Location in England Location in Surrey

The 1998 Volvo PGA Championship was the 44th edition of the Volvo PGA Championship, an annual professional golf tournament on the European Tour. It was held 22–25 May at the West Course of Wentworth Club in Virginia Water, Surrey, England, a suburb southwest of London.

Colin Montgomerie won his first Volvo PGA Championship with a one stroke victory over Ernie Els, Gary Orr and Patrik Sjöland.

== Round summaries ==
=== First round ===
Thursday, 22 May 1998

Place	Player	Score	To par
1	(Sweden) Michael Jonzon	66	−6
2	(England) Brian Davis	67	−5
T3	(Sweden) Mats Hallberg	68	−4
T3	(England) David Howell	68	−4
T3	(England) Malcolm MacKenzie	68	−4
T3	(Netherlands) Chris van der Velde	68	−4
T7	(South Africa) Ernie Els	69	−3
T7	(England) Stephen Field	69	−3
T7	(Spain) Domingo Hospital	69	−3
T7	(England) Mark James	69	−3
T7	(Zimbabwe) Tony Johnstone	69	−3
T7	(Germany) Bernhard Langer	69	−3
T7	(Australia) Stephen Leaney	69	−3
T7	(Scotland) Sandy Lyle	69	−3
T7	(Zimbabwe) Mark McNulty	69	−3
T7	(England) Gary Stubbington	69	−3
T7	(England) David Tapping	69	−3
T7	(South Africa) Clinton Whitelaw	69	−3

=== Second round ===
Friday, 23 May 1998

Place	Player	Score	To par
1	(Sweden) Michael Jonzon	66-70=136	−8
T2	(Sweden) Mats Hallberg	68-69=137	−7
T2	(Australia) Peter Lonard	72-65=137	−7
T4	(Scotland) Andrew Coltart	72-66=138	−6
T4	(South Africa) Ernie Els	69-69=138	−6
T4	(Spain) Domingo Hospital	69-69=138	−6
T4	(New Zealand) Greg Turner	70-68=138	−6
T8	(Denmark) Thomas Bjørn	70-69=139	−5
T8	(Northern Ireland) Darren Clarke	71-68=139	−5
T8	(England) David Gilford	70-69=139	−5
T8	(Republic of Ireland) Pádraig Harrington	70-69=139	−5
T8	(England) David Howell	68-71=139	−5
T8	(Germany) Bernhard Langer	69-70=139	−5
T8	(England) Malcolm MacKenzie	68-71=139	−5
T8	(Scotland) Gary Orr	70-69=139	−5
T8	(Scotland) Dean Robertson	70-69=139	−5

=== Third round ===
Saturday, 24 May 1998

Place	Player	Score	To par
1	(Scotland) Colin Montgomerie	70-70-65=205	−11
T2	(Sweden) Mats Hallberg	68-69-69=206	−10
T2	(Scotland) Dean Robertson	70-69-67=206	−10
T4	(South Africa) Ernie Els	69-69-69=207	−9
T4	(England) David Gilford	70-69-68=207	−9
T4	(Scotland) Gary Orr	70-69-68=207	−9
T7	(Spain) Seve Ballesteros	72-71-65=208	−8
T7	(Denmark) Thomas Bjørn	70-69-69=208	−8
T7	(Scotland) Andrew Coltart	72-66-70=208	−8
T7	(Republic of Ireland) Pádraig Harrington	70-69-69=208	−8
T7	(Sweden) Michael Jonzon	66-70-72=208	−8
T7	(Australia) Peter Lonard	72-65-71=208	−8
T7	(New Zealand) Greg Turner	70-68-70=208	−8

=== Final round ===
Sunday, 25 May 1998

Place	Player	Score	To par	Money (€)
1	(Scotland) Colin Montgomerie	70-70-65-69=274	−14	280,000
T2	(South Africa) Ernie Els	69-69-69-68=275	−13	125,207
T2	(Scotland) Gary Orr	70-69-68-68=275	−13	125,207
T2	(Sweden) Patrik Sjöland	72-71-66-66=275	−13	125,207
T5	(Denmark) Thomas Bjørn	70-69-69-68=276	−12	52,024
T5	(Scotland) Andrew Coltart	72-66-70-68=276	−12	52,024
T5	(Sweden) Mats Hallberg	68-69-69-70=276	−12	52,024
T5	(Australia) Peter Lonard	72-65-71-68=276	−12	52,024
T5	(Scotland) Dean Robertson	70-69-67-70=276	−12	52,024
10	(Republic of Ireland) Paul McGinley	72-69-68-68=277	−11	33,600
