= Diego Borrego =

Spanish golfer (born 1972)

Personal information
- Full name: Diego Borrego
- Nationality: Spain
- Born: 29 January 1972 (age 54) Málaga, Spain
- Height: 1.80 m (5 ft 11 in)

Career
- Sport: Golf
- Turned professional: 1991
- Former tour: European Tour
- Professional wins: 7

Number of wins by tour
- European Tour: 2
- Challenge Tour: 3
- Other: 3

Best results in major championships
- Masters Tournament: DNP
- PGA Championship: DNP
- U.S. Open: DNP
- The Open Championship: CUT: 1996
Medal record
Mediterranean Games
Bronze medal – third place	1991 Athens	Men's team

Diego Borrego (born 29 January 1972) is a Spanish golfer.

== Early life ==
Borrego started playing golf at the age of seven.

== Professional career ==
In 1991, Borrego turned professional. He was a rookie on the European Tour in 1994, and two years later, he had his best season, winning the Turespana Masters and finishing thirtieth on the European Tour Order of Merit. He won his second European Tour title at the 2002 Madeira Island Open but he has sometimes struggled to hold on to his card and in 2006 dropped down to the second tier Challenge Tour.

== Amateur wins ==
- 1989 Sherry Cup
- 1990 Spanish Amateur Open Championship
- 1991 Italian Amateur Open Championship, Spanish Amateur Closed Championship

== Professional wins (7) ==
=== European Tour wins (2) ===
No.	Date	Tournament	Winning score	Margin of victory	Runner(s)-up
1	28 Apr 1996	Turespaña Masters	−17 (66-67-69-69=271)	Playoff	(Zimbabwe) Tony Johnstone
2	24 Mar 2002	Madeira Island Open^{1}	−7 (72-68-72-69=281)	1 stroke	(Spain) Ivó Giner, (Netherlands) Maarten Lafeber

^{1}Dual-ranking event with the Challenge Tour

European Tour playoff record (1–0)

No.	Year	Tournament	Opponent	Result
1	1996	Turespaña Masters	(Zimbabwe) Tony Johnstone	Won with par on third extra hole

=== Challenge Tour wins (3) ===
No.	Date	Tournament	Winning score	Margin of victory	Runner(s)-up
1	16 Jul 1993	Pro-Am de Leman	−10 (67-72-71-68=278)	3 strokes	(Italy) Giuseppe Calì
2	10 Sep 1995	Perrier European Pro-Am	−9 (71-74-71-63=279)	1 stroke	(England) Jonathan Lomas
3	24 Mar 2002	Madeira Island Open^{1}	−7 (72-68-72-69=281)	1 stroke	(Spain) Ivó Giner, (Netherlands) Maarten Lafeber

^{1}Dual-ranking event with the European Tour

=== Other wins (3) ===
- 1998 Azores Open (Portugal)
- 1999 Campeonato de Catalunya, Oki Telepizza - Salamanca (both Spain)

== Team appearances ==
Amateur

- Jacques Léglise Trophy (representing the Continent of Europe): 1988, 1989
- Eisenhower Trophy (representing Spain): 1990
- European Boys' Team Championship (representing Spain): 1990 (winners)
- European Amateur Team Championship (representing Spain): 1991

Professional

- Dunhill Cup (representing Spain): 1996
- World Cup (representing Spain): 1996
