= Bank Austria Open =

Tournament information
- Location: Donnerskirchen, Austria
- Established: 1992
- Course: Neusiedlersee-Donnerskirchen Golf Club
- Par: 72
- Length: 6,163 yards (5,635 m)
- Tour: Challenge Tour
- Format: Stroke play
- Prize fund: £50,000
- Month played: July
- Final year: 1994

Tournament record score
- Aggregate: 276 Michael Campbell (1994)
- To par: −12 as above

Current champion
- (New Zealand) Michael Campbell

Location map
- Location in Austria

The Bank Austria Open was a golf tournament on the Challenge Tour, played in July 1992–1994 at Donnerskirchen in Burgenland, Austria. The Bank Austria Open should not be confused with the 2008 edition of the Austrian Open on the European Tour, which was known as Bank Austria GolfOpen for sponsorship reasons. The final champion, as well as tournament record scorer, was a young Michael Campbell, winner of the 2005 U.S. Open.

== Winners ==
Year	Winner	Score	To par	Margin of victory	Runner(s)-up	Ref.
1994	(New Zealand) Michael Campbell	276	−12	2 strokes	(England) Stuart Cage	
1993	(Sweden) Klas Eriksson	278	−10	1 stroke	(Northern Ireland) Stephen Hamill (France) Jean-François Remésy	
1992	(Wales) Stephen Dodd	277	−11	3 strokes	(Scotland) Gordon Manson	
