= Leman Pro-Am =

Golf tournament

Pro-Am de Leman
Tournament information
- Location: Geneva, Switzerland
- Established: 1989
- Course: Golf Club de Genève
- Par: 72
- Tour: Challenge Tour
- Format: Stroke play
- Prize fund: CHF 100,000
- Month played: July
- Final year: 1993

Tournament record score
- Aggregate: 276 Tim Planchin (1992)
- To par: −12 as above

Final champion
- (Spain) Diego Borrego

Location map
- Location in Switzerland

The Leman Pro-Am was a golf tournament on the Challenge Tour, held 1990–1993 at Lac Leman, either in Switzerland or France (1991).

== Winners ==
Year	Winner	Score	To par	Margin of victory	Runner(s)-up	Ref.
Pro-Am de Leman
1993	(Spain) Diego Borrego	278	−10	3 strokes	(Italy) Giuseppe Calì	
Pro-Am Moet & Chandon du Leman
1992	(France) Tim Planchin (2)	276	−12	1 stroke	(France) Marc Pendariès	
Moet & Chandon Pro-Am
1991	(France) Christophe Lacroix	279	−9	2 strokes	(Germany) Heinz-Peter Thül	
Leman Pro-Am
1990	(France) Quentin Dabson	284	−4	5 strokes	(England) Jeremy Bennett (Italy) Giuseppe Calì	
1989	(France) Tim Planchin	282	−2	2 strokes	(England) John Gould (Italy) Costantino Rocca	
