= David A. Russell (golfer) =

English golfer (born 1957)

Personal information
- Nationality: England
- Born: 6 November 1957 (age 68) Dartford, England
- Height: 6 ft 3 in (1.91 m)
- Weight: 203 lb (92 kg; 14.5 st)

Career
- Sport: Golf
- Turned professional: 1976
- Former tours: European Tour; Challenge Tour
- Professional wins: 1

Number of wins by tour
- Challenge Tour: 1

Best results in major championships
- Masters Tournament: DNP
- PGA Championship: DNP
- U.S. Open: DNP
- The Open Championship: T24: 1997

David A. Russell (born 6 November 1957) is a retired English professional golfer who played on the European Tour between 1978 and 1996 and then briefly on the European Seniors Tour in 2008.

== Career ==
Russell was born in Dartford, England, and turned professional in 1976. That autumn he went to the first Qualifying school held at Walton Heath. He was the medalist with a score of 296.

Russell played on the European Tour and Challenge Tour. His best finish on the European Tour was second place at the 1987 KLM Dutch Open. He won one event on the Challenge Tour, the 1997 Audi Quattro Trophy. In 1992, he suffered a hand injury that kept him out for eight months. He led the 1993 Heineken Dutch Open at one stage, but eventually finished 19th, two shots over par.

Russell played in The Open Championship seven times, making the cut four times, tied for 44th in 1985, T-38 in 1988, T-67 in 1996, and T-24 in 1997.

In 1994, Russell played ten events of the PGA Tour making the cut in three.

== Personal life ==
Russell is married, and he and his wife Sharon have had two children, both girls.

== Professional wins (1) ==
=== Challenge Tour wins (1) ===
No.	Date	Tournament	Winning score	Margin of victory	Runner-up
1	29 Jun 1997	Audi Quattro Trophy	−5 (67-74-68-70=279)	Playoff	(Australia) Greg Chalmers

Challenge Tour playoff record (1–0)

No.	Year	Tournament	Opponent	Result
1	1997	Audi Quattro Trophy	(Australia) Greg Chalmers	Won with birdie on first extra hole

== Results in major championships ==
Tournament	1984	1985	1986	1987	1988	1989	1990	1991	1992	1993	1994	1995	1996	1997
The Open Championship	CUT	T44	CUT		T38		CUT						T67	T24

Note: Russell only played in The Open Championship.

Did not play

CUT = missed the half-way cut (3rd round cut in 1984 Open Championship)
"T" = tied
