= 1991 Challenge Tour =

Golf tour season

1991 Challenge Tour season
- Duration: 6 December 1990 – 12 October 1991
- Number of official events: 33
- Most wins: (Sweden) Mats Hallberg (2) (Sweden) Peter Hedblom (2) (England) David R. Jones (2) (Sweden) Fredrik Larsson (2) (England) Jonathan Sewell (2)
- Rankings: (England) David R. Jones

The 1991 Challenge Tour was the third season of the Challenge Tour, the official development tour to the European Tour.

== Schedule ==
The following table lists official events during the 1991 season.

| Date | Tournament | Host country | Purse (£) | Winner (Note: The number in brackets after each winner's name is the number of Challenge Tour events they had won up to and including that tournament. This information is only shown for Challenge Tour members. It is rare for someone to accumulate many wins on the Challenge Tour as success at this level usually leads to promotion to the European Tour.) | OWGR points | Notes |
|---|---|---|---|---|---|---|
| 9 Dec | Nigerian Open | Nigeria | 80,000 | (England) Wayne Stephens (1) | 6 | New to Challenge Tour |
| 16 Dec | Ivory Coast Open | Ivory Coast | 78,000 | (Wales) David Llewellyn (1) | 8 | New to Challenge Tour |
| 13 Jan | Zimbabwe Open | Zimbabwe | 75,000 | (England) Keith Waters (1) | n/a | New to Challenge Tour |
| 20 Jan | Zambia Open | Zambia | 75,000 | (England) David R. Jones (1) | n/a | New to Challenge Tour |
| 27 Jan | Kenya Open | Kenya | 75,000 | (England) Jeremy Robinson (3) | n/a | New to Challenge Tour |
| 6 Apr | Tessali Open | Italy | Lit 110,000,000 | (France) Éric Giraud (1) | n/a | |
| 12 May | Milano Open | Italy | Lit 100,000,000 | (France) Jean-Charles Cambon (1) | n/a | New tournament |
| 19 May | Ramlösa Open | Sweden | SKr 350,000 | (Sweden) Fredrik Larsson (1) | n/a | |
| 23 May | Prince's Challenge | England | 25,000 | (England) Ian Spencer (1) | n/a | |
| 26 May | SIAB Open | Sweden | SKr 350,000 | (England) Jon Evans (1) | n/a | |
| 30 May | Bolton Old Links Challenge | England | 25,000 | (England) Stephen Field (1) | n/a | New tournament |
| 2 Jun | Open de Dijon Bourgogne | France | 40,000 | (Sweden) Mikael Krantz (1) | n/a | New tournament |
| 2 Jun | Jede Hot Cup | Sweden | SKr 250,000 | (Sweden) Mats Hallberg (2) | n/a | |
| 6 Jun | Cawder Challenge | Scotland | 25,000 | (Wales) Neil Roderick (1) | n/a | New tournament |
| 8 Jun | Cerutti Open | Italy | Lit 130,000,000 | (England) Jonathan Sewell (1) | n/a | |
| 9 Jun | Open Vittel | France | 50,000 | (England) Chris Platts (1) | n/a | |
| 15 Jun | Open de Lyon | France | 70,000 | (Republic of Ireland) John McHenry (3) | n/a | |
| 16 Jun | Stiga Open | Sweden | SKr 330,000 | (Sweden) Mats Hallberg (3) | n/a | |
| 22 Jun | Martini Open | Italy | Lit 150,000,000 | (South Africa) John Bland (1) | n/a | New tournament |
| 23 Jun | Formula Micro Danish Open | Denmark | SKr 350,000 | (Sweden) Peter Hedblom (2) | n/a | New tournament |
| 30 Jun | Audi Quattro Trophy | Germany | 50,000 | (Germany) Alex Čejka (1) | n/a | |
| 14 Jul | Volvo Finnish Open | Finland | SKr 330,000 | (Sweden) Fredrik Larsson (2) | n/a | |
| 21 Jul | SM Match Play | Sweden | SKr 400,000 | (Sweden) Mathias Grönberg (1) | n/a | |
| 4 Aug | Audi Open | Germany | 55,000 | (England) Paul Eales (1) | n/a | |
| 11 Aug | Länsförsäkringar Open | Sweden | SKr 600,000 | (Sweden) Johan Ryström (1) | n/a | |
| 18 Aug | Gefle Open | Sweden | SKr 350,000 | (Sweden) Mats Lanner (3) | n/a | |
| 1 Sep | SI Compaq Open | Sweden | SKr 1,000,000 | (England) Jonathan Sewell (2) | n/a | |
| 8 Sep | Västerås Open | Sweden | SKr 350,000 | (Sweden) Vilhelm Forsbrand (2) | n/a | |
| 16 Sep | Upsala Golf International | Sweden | SKr 200,000 | (Sweden) Peter Hedblom (3) | n/a | New tournament |
| 22 Sep | Viking Open | Sweden | SKr 250,000 | (Argentina) José Cantero (2) | n/a | |
| 6 Oct | Grenoble Pro 91 | France | 50,000 | (England) Roger Winchester (1) | n/a | New tournament |
| 12 Oct | Bulles Laurent Perrier | France | 20,000 | (France) Roger Sabarros (2) | n/a | New tournament |

=== Unofficial events ===
The following events were sanctioned by the Challenge Tour, but did not carry official money, wins were still official however.

| Date | Tournament | Host country | Purse (£) | Winner | OWGR points | Notes |
|---|---|---|---|---|---|---|
| 17 May | Clydesdale Bank Northern Open | Scotland | 22,500 | (England) Craig Cassels (1) | n/a | New to Challenge Tour |
| 9 Jun | Teleannons Grand Prix | Sweden | SKr 450,000 | (Sweden) Jan Tilmanis (1) | n/a | |
| 7 Jul | Neuchâtel Open SBS Trophy | Switzerland | CHF 100,000 | (Germany) Heinz-Peter Thül (2) | n/a | |
| 19 Jul | Moet & Chandon Pro-Am | Switzerland | CHF 100,000 | (France) Christophe Lacroix (1) | n/a | |
| 24 Aug | Rolex Pro-Am | Switzerland | CHF 100,000 | (England) David R. Jones (2) | n/a | |
| 8 Sep | Perrier Belgian Pro-Am | Belgium | 40,000 | (England) George Ryall (1) | n/a | |

== Rankings ==
The rankings were based on prize money won during the season, calculated in Pound sterling. The top 10 players on the rankings earned status to play on the 1992 European Tour (Volvo Tour).

| Rank | Player | Prize money (£) |
|---|---|---|
| 1 | (England) David R. Jones | 35,533 |
| 2 | (England) Jonathan Sewell | 32,298 |
| 3 | (England) Roger Winchester | 29,172 |
| 4 | (Republic of Ireland) John McHenry | 28,961 |
| 5 | (England) Jeremy Robinson | 28,481 |

== See also ==
- 1991 Swedish Golf Tour
