= Mikael Krantz =

Swedish professional golfer

Personal information
- Nationality: Sweden
- Born: 13 September 1965 (age 61) Sweden

Career
- Sport: Golf
- Turned professional: 1987
- Former tours: European Tour; Challenge Tour
- Professional wins: 6

Number of wins by tour
- Challenge Tour: 4
- Other: 2

Best results in major championships
- Masters Tournament: DNP
- PGA Championship: DNP
- U.S. Open: DNP
- The Open Championship: 77th: 1993

Mikael Krantz (born 13 September 1965) is a Swedish professional golfer.

Krantz played on the European Tour 1989–1994 where his best result was a tie for 12th in the 1993 Open de España. He played on the Challenge Tour from 1991–1999 where he enjoyed success, winning four times 1991–1992, putting him on the list of golfers with most Challenge Tour wins. His best result outside Europe was a top-10 finish in the 1991 New Zealand Open at Titirangi, a PGA Tour of Australasia tournament.

Krantz played in The Open Championship three times: 1990 at St Andrews, 1993 at Royal St Georges and 1994 at Turnberry. He made the cut at Royal St Georges.

After his career Krantz moved to Germany in 2004 to become a teaching pro at Golfanlage Kirchheim-Wendlingen outside Stuttgart.

== Professional wins (6) ==
=== Challenge Tour wins (4) ===
No.	Date	Tournament	Winning score	Margin of victory	Runner(s)-up
1	2 Jun 1991	Open de Dijon Bourgogne	−7 (281)		(France) Thomas Levet
2	31 May 1992	SIAB Open	−8 (72-70-71-67=280)	4 strokes	(Sweden) Olle Karlsson, (Sweden) Klas Eriksson
3	26 Jul 1992	Open des Volcans	−11 (69-71-71-66=277)	Playoff	(England) Craig Cassells, (England) Jeremy Robinson, (United States) Ronald Stelten
4	26 Sep 1992	Challenge Novotel	−10 (70-68-67-73=278)	2 strokes	(France) Jean-Ignace Mouhica

=== Swedish Golf Tour wins (2) ===
No.	Date	Tournament	Winning score	Margin of victory	Runner-up
1	24 Jul 1988	SM Match Trygg-Hansa Cup	1 up		(Sweden) Anders Gillner
2	21 Sep 1997	Helsingborg Golf Open	−9 (69-72-66=207)	2 strokes	(Sweden) Johan Annerfelt

== Team appearances ==
Amateur

- European Boys' Team Championship (representing Sweden): 1982, 1983 (winners)
- Jacques Léglise Trophy (representing the Continent of Europe): 1982, 1983

== See also ==
- List of golfers with most Challenge Tour wins
