= Jämtland Open =

Tournament information
- Location: Östersund, Sweden
- Established: 1994
- Course: Östersund-Frösö Golf Club
- Par: 73
- Tours: Challenge Tour; Swedish Golf Tour
- Format: Stroke play
- Prize fund: kr 300,000
- Final year: 1994

Tournament record score
- Aggregate: 210 Daniel Chopra
- To par: −9 as above

Final champion
- (Sweden) Daniel Chopra

Location map
- Location in Sweden

The Jämtland Open was a golf tournament on the Swedish Golf Tour that was co-sanctioned by the Challenge Tour. It was only played in 1994 and held in Östersund, Sweden.

== History ==
Daniel Chopra won the tournament by birdying the final four holes. The final birdie putt was 12 meters.

== Winners ==
Year	Tour (Note: CHA − Challenge Tour; SWE − Swedish Golf Tour.)	Winner	Score	To par	Margin of victory	Runner-up	Ref.
1994	CHA, SWE	(Sweden) Daniel Chopra	71-71-68=210	−9	1 stroke	(Sweden) Mats Hallberg	
