= Challenge Novotel =

Golf tournament in France

Tournament information
- Location: Courson, France
- Established: 1992
- Course: Courson Monteloup
- Par: 72
- Tour: Challenge Tour
- Format: Stroke play
- Prize fund: £50,000
- Month played: September
- Final year: 1994

Tournament record score
- Aggregate: 276 Klas Eriksson (1993)
- To par: −12 as above

Final champion
- (Sweden) Jarmo Sandelin
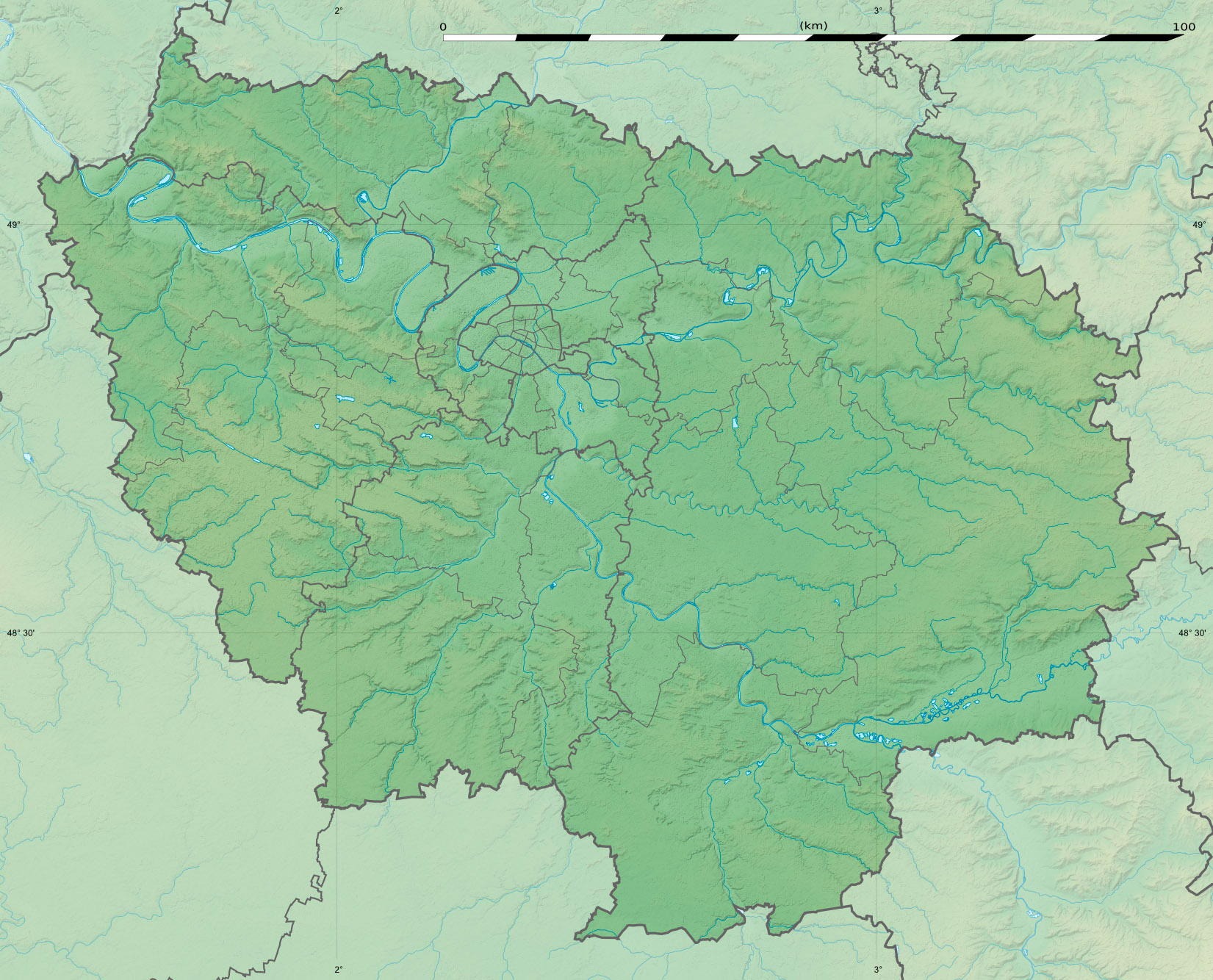
- Location in France Location in Île-de-France

The Challenge Novotel was a golf tournament on the Challenge Tour. It was played from 1992 to 1994 in France.

== Winners ==
Year	Winner	Score	To par	Margin of victory	Runner-up	Venue	Ref.
1994	(Sweden) Jarmo Sandelin	278	−10	1 stroke	(Sweden) Fredrik Andersson	Courson Monteloup	
1993	(Sweden) Klas Eriksson	276	−12	1 stroke	(France) Michel Besanceney	Golf Domaine de Feucherolles	
1992	(Sweden) Mikael Krantz	278	−10	2 strokes	(France) Jean-Ignace Mouhica	Courson Monteloup	
