= Vilhelm Forsbrand =

Swedish professional golfer

Personal information
- Nickname: Ville
- Nationality: Sweden
- Born: 15 January 1970 (age 56)
- Spouse: Malin Svensson
- Children: 3 (Emil, Elin, Nellie)

Career
- Sport: Golf
- Turned professional: 1987
- Former tours: European Tour (joined 1991); Challenge Tour (joined 1990)
- Professional wins: 3

Number of wins by tour
- Challenge Tour: 2
- Other: 1

Vilhelm Forsbrand (born 15 January 1970) is a Swedish professional golfer who played on the European Tour.

== Career ==
Forsbrand grew up playing golf at the 9-hole course at small Uddeholm Golf Club in Värmland, Sweden. By age 6 he competed in the unofficial National Youth Championship, Colgate Cup, at the 10-years age category and in 1980 he won the same competition.

He turned professional in 1987, following in the footsteps of his older brother Anders, who became a six-time European Tour winner.

Forsbrand played on the Swedish Golf Tour where he finished third on the 1990 Order of Merit, behind Mikael Högberg and Adam Mednick. From 1990 to 1994, the Swedish Golf Tour tournaments were co-sanctioned by the Challenge Tour, where he won the 1990 Västerås Open and successfully defended his title in 1991.

In his rookie season on the European Tour 1991, 21 years old, he made the cut nine times, including at the Open de Baleares, Austrian Open and Volvo Open di Firenze. At the Baleares, he outscored his brother Anders by one shot. At Firenze, after three rounds, he again was ahead by one shot, and was tied for 6th place. In the end, he shot rounds of 67-68-73-77 for 285, while Anders shot 71-72-66-65 for 274 and victory in the tournament.

Forsbrand ended the 1991 European Tour season ranked 144 and dropped down to the Challenge Tour, where he was runner-up at the 1992 Ramlösa Open. He was also runner-up, 3 strokes behind Niclas Fasth, at the 1993 Compaq Open/Swedish PGA Championship, the most prestigious tournament on the Swedish Golf Tour and won by Forsbrand's elder brother eleven years earlier. He reached the 1993 European Tour Qualifying School Finals and made the cut, but finished outside the top 40.

After retiring from tournament play in 1996, Forsbrand became a PGA Club Professional and settled in Vaxholm, Stockholm County, serving as head pro at Waxholm Golf Club 2009–2014. In 2012, he married Malin Svensson, a former leader of the Centre Party Youth who became municipal council chairman, effectively mayor, of Vaxholm Municipality following the 2018 elections.

== Professional wins (3) ==
=== Challenge Tour wins (2) ===
No.	Date	Tournament	Winning score	Margin of victory	Runner(s)-up
1	9 Sep 1990	Västerås Open	−8 (70-66-63-69=268)	2 strokes	(Sweden) Daniel Westermark
2	8 Sep 1991	Västerås Open (2)	−5 (67-65-70=202)	2 strokes	(England) Craig Cassells, (Sweden) Anders Gillner

=== Other wins (1) ===
- 2008 Titleist PGA 4-Ball Championship (with Martin Wiklund)
