= Jonathan Lomas =

English professional golfer (born 1968)

Personal information
- Full name: Jonathan Lomas
- Nationality: England
- Born: 7 May 1968 (age 58) Chesterfield, England
- Height: 5 ft 9 in (1.75 m)

Career
- Sport: Golf
- Turned professional: 1988
- Former tour: European Tour
- Professional wins: 6

Number of wins by tour
- European Tour: 1
- Challenge Tour: 3
- Other: 2

Best results in major championships
- Masters Tournament: DNP
- PGA Championship: DNP
- U.S. Open: T57: 2005
- The Open Championship: T11: 1994

Achievements and awards
- Sir Henry Cotton Rookie of the Year: 1994

Jonathan Lomas (born 7 May 1968) is an English professional golfer.

== Career ==
Lomas was born in Chesterfield, Derbyshire. He turned professional in 1988. He won three times on the second tier Challenge Tour in 1992 and 1993 and was named as the European Tour's Sir Henry Cotton Rookie of the Year in 1994.

Lomas's best season on the European Tour was 1996, when he won the Czech Open and finished 20th on the Order of Merit. He also represented England in the Alfred Dunhill Cup that year. He held on to his tour card until 2007, and except for a few invitations to tour events, has mainly played tournaments and pro-ams on the Scottish professional circuit since then.

== Awards and honours ==
In 1994, Lomas earned the European Tour's Sir Henry Cotton Rookie of the Year award.

== Professional wins (6) ==
=== European Tour wins (1) ===
No.	Date	Tournament	Winning score	Margin of victory	Runner-up
1	18 Aug 1996	Chemapol Trophy Czech Open	−12 (69-68-69-66=272)	1 stroke	(Sweden) Daniel Chopra

=== Challenge Tour wins (3) ===
No.	Date	Tournament	Winning score	Margin of victory	Runner(s)-up
1	3 May 1992	Challenge Dumez	−10 (71-72-64-71=278)	6 strokes	(England) Wayne Henry, (United States) Charles Raulerson
2	27 Jun 1993	Audi Quattro Trophy	−16 (68-67-70-67=272)	6 strokes	(France) Olivier Edmond, (Sweden) Jarmo Sandelin
3	16 Oct 1993	Perugia Open	−14 (73-67-66-64=270)	2 strokes	(Italy) Silvio Grappasonni

=== Other wins (2) ===
- 1996 Open Novotel Perrier (with Steven Bottomley)
- 1999 Mauritius Open

== Results in major championships ==
Tournament	1994	1995	1996	1997	1998	1999
U.S. Open						
The Open Championship	T11	T68		T33		

Tournament	2000	2001	2002	2003	2004	2005	2006	2007	2008
U.S. Open						T57			
The Open Championship									T64

Did not play

CUT = missed the half-way cut
"T" = tied
Note: Lomas never played in the Masters Tournament or the PGA Championship.

== Team appearances ==
- Dunhill Cup (representing England): 1996
