= Olle Nordberg (golfer) =

Swedish professional golfer

Personal information
- Nationality: Sweden
- Born: 5 February 1967 (age 59) Boden, Sweden

Career
- Sport: Golf
- Turned professional: 1989
- Former tours: European Tour; Asian Tour; Challenge Tour
- Professional wins: 3

Number of wins by tour
- Challenge Tour: 2
- Other: 1

Best results in major championships
- Masters Tournament: DNP
- PGA Championship: DNP
- U.S. Open: CUT: 1995
- The Open Championship: DNP

Olle Nordberg (born 2 May 1967) is a Swedish professional golfer who played on the Asian Tour and European Tour.

== Amateur career ==
Nordberg was introduced to golf at an early age by his father, Björn Nordberg, an elite golfer who captained the winning Swedish European Boys' Team Championship teams in 1983 and 1991, and later served as European Golf Association President, Swedish Golf Federation President, and European Tour Board Non-Executive Director.

Nordberg grew up in Boden. In 1982, the family moved to Täby where Nordberg attended the Danderyd Golfgymnasium. He had a successful youth career and won the Swedish Junior Championship in 1985 (U-19), 1986 and 1987, and was runner-up at the 1987 British Youths Open Championship following a playoff. He represented Sweden at the 1984 and 1985 European Boys' Team Championships and represented the Continent of Europe at the 1987 EGA Trophy.

== Professional career ==
After graduating high school, Nordberg further developed his game in North America and became a tour player, joining the nascent Challenge Tour in 1989. He won the 1990 FLA Open. In 1992 he joined the European Tour where he played 18 tournaments and made 6 cuts, dropping down to the Challenge Tour for the 1993 season. After winning the Tessali Open in Italy and three runner-up positions at Zambia Open, Collingtree Park Challenge and Rolex Pro-Am, he finished third on the 1993 Challenge Tour Order of Merit, earning a European Tour card for 1994. On the 1994 European Tour, he made 10 cuts in 24 tournaments and finished ranked 163rd.

In 1995, Nordberg joined the Asia Golf Circuit and later the fledgling Asian Tour, where he played until retiring in 2009. In 1995, he won the non-tour Philippine Masters and finished fourth at the Thailand Open and runner-up at the Philippine Open.

Nordberg played in the 1995 U.S. Open at Shinnecock Hills Golf Club, New York where he did not make the cut. In total, he played 76 tournaments on the European Tour from 1986 to 2007.

After retiring from tour, Nordberg continued to live in Bangkok, Thailand, working for the Asian Tour.

== Amateur wins ==
- 1985 Swedish Junior Championship (U-19)
- 1986 Swedish Junior Championship
- 1987 Swedish Junior Championship

== Professional wins (3) ==
=== Challenge Tour wins (2) ===
No.	Date	Tournament	Winning score	Margin of victory	Runner(s)-up
1	3 Jun 1990	FLA Open	−8 (74-71-69-70=284)	Playoff	(Sweden) Mikael Högberg
2	3 Apr 1993	Tessali Open	−1 (74-72-70-71=287)	Playoff	(England) Neal Briggs, (England) Andrew Sandywell

Challenge Tour playoff record (2–1)

No.	Year	Tournament	Opponent(s)	Result
1	1990	FLA Open	(Sweden) Mikael Högberg	Won with birdie on first extra hole
2	1993	Zambia Open	(Argentina) José Cantero, (England) Peter Harrison, (France) Frédéric Regard	Harrison won with birdie on second extra hole
3	1993	Tessali Open	(England) Neal Briggs, (England) Andrew Sandywell	Won with birdie on fourth extra hole Briggs eliminated by par on first hole

=== Other wins (1) ===
- 1995 Philippine Masters

== Team appearances ==
Amateur

- European Boys' Team Championship (representing Sweden): 1984, 1985
- EGA Trophy (representing the Continent of Europe): 1987 (winners)
