= Esab Open =

Tournament information
- Location: Kungsbacka, Sweden
- Established: 1986
- Course: Kungsbacka Golf Club
- Par: 72
- Tours: Challenge Tour; Nordic Golf League; Swedish Golf Tour
- Format: Stroke play
- Prize fund: kr 400,000
- Month played: September
- Final year: 2000

Tournament record score
- Aggregate: 205 Ove Sellberg (1988)
- To par: −14 Patrik Gottfridsson (1999)

Final champion
- (Sweden) Linus Pettersson

Location map
- Location in Sweden

The Esab Open was a golf tournament on the Swedish Golf Tour and the Challenge Tour. The inaugural tournament was held in Örebro, then it moved to Kungsbacka, Sweden.

== Winners ==
Year	Tour (Note: CHA − Challenge Tour; SWE − Swedish Golf Tour.)	Winner	Score	To par	Margin of victory	Runner(s)-up	Purse (SEK)	Venue	Ref.
DFDS Tor Line Open
2000	NGL	(Sweden) Linus Pettersson (a)	281	−7	1 stroke	(Sweden) Jens Nilsson	400,000	Kungsbacka	
1999	NGL	(Sweden) Patrik Gottfridsson	274	−14	3 strokes	(Sweden) Henrik Stenson (Sweden) Lars Tingvall (Sweden) Peter Viktor	400,000	Kungsbacka	
Tor Line Open
1998	SWE	(Sweden) Johan Bjerhag	280	−8	1 stroke	(Sweden) Jimmy Kawalec	350,000	Kungsbacka	
1997	SWE	(Sweden) Fredrik Forsvall	142 (Note: Shortened to 36 holes due to rain.)	+1	1 stroke	(Sweden) Ola Eliasson	200,000	Kungsbacka	
1991–1996: No tournament
Esab Open
1990	CHA	(Argentina) Ricardo González	135	−9	Playoff	(Denmark) Ole Eskildsen	300,000	Kungsbacka	
1989	CHA	(Sweden) Carl-Magnus Strömberg	213	−3	3 strokes	(Sweden) Mikael Hed	260,000	Kungsbacka	
1988	SWE	(Sweden) Ove Sellberg	205	−11	6 strokes	(Sweden) Jesper Parnevik	260,000	Kungsbacka	
1987	SWE	(Sweden) Mikael Karlsson	218	+2	2 strokes	(Sweden) Peter Carsbo	200,000	Kungsbacka	
1986	SWE	(Sweden) Mikael Högberg	213	E	Playoff	(Sweden) Johan Ryström (Sweden) Ove Sellberg	175,000	Örebro	
