= Daniel Chopra =

Swedish professional golfer

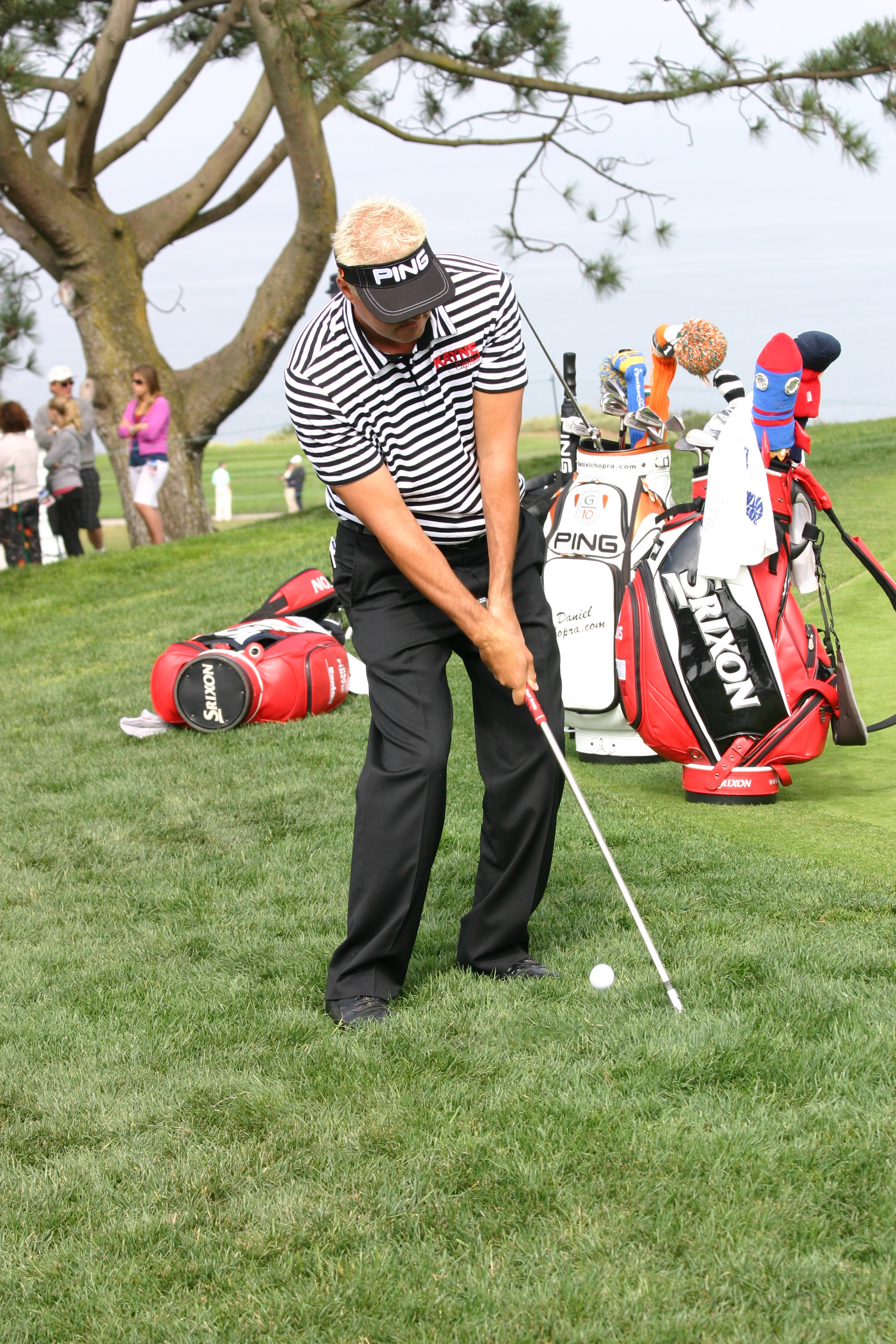
- Chopra at the 2008 U.S. Open

Personal information
- Full name: Daniel Samir Chopra
- Nickname: Danny Chops
- Nationality: Sweden
- Born: 23 December 1973 (age 52) Stockholm, Sweden
- Height: 6 ft 0 in (1.83 m)
- Weight: 180 lb (82 kg; 13 st)
- Life partner: Samantha (m. 2000)
- Children: 2

Career
- Sport: Golf
- Turned professional: 1992
- Former tours: PGA Tour; European Tour; Asian Tour; Asia Golf Circuit; Web.com Tour; Challenge Tour; Swedish Golf Tour
- Professional wins: 14
- Highest ranking: 60 (13 January 2008)

Number of wins by tour
- PGA Tour: 2
- Asian Tour: 1
- Korn Ferry Tour: 3
- Challenge Tour: 2
- Other: 6

Best results in major championships
- Masters Tournament: CUT: 2008
- PGA Championship: T41: 2006
- U.S. Open: T24: 2004
- The Open Championship: CUT: 2005, 2012

Achievements and awards
- Asia Golf Circuit Rookie of the Year: 1995

Daniel Samir Chopra (born 23 December 1973) is a Swedish professional golfer.

== Early life ==
Chopra was born in Stockholm, Sweden. He represents Sweden and his mother was Swedish, but his father was Indian and Daniel moved to India at age seven where he was raised by his grandparents. He won the All-India Junior Golf Championship at age 14.

== Professional career ==
In 1992, Chopra turned professional. From 1996 to 2002 he played intermittently on the European Tour, sometimes failing to retain his tour card, and in 2004 he joined the U.S.-based PGA Tour.

With his victory at the 2004 Henrico County Open on the second tier Nationwide Tour, Chopra shot a new tour record over 72 holes in relation to par, shooting a 30-under-par score of 258. The record stood for 20 years until it was beaten in April 2024 by Chopra's fellow countryman Tim Widing.

In 2007, Chopra won his first PGA Tour event at the Ginn sur Mer Classic at Tesoro. Two PGA Tour events later he picked up another win at the season opening Mercedes-Benz Championship. On January 13, 2008, Chopra reached a career best 60th on the Official World Golf Ranking.

After his second PGA Tour win, Chopra's career started to fluctuate between the PGA Tour and second-tier (what was then) Nationwide Tour.

A difficult 2010 season, where he made only eight PGA Tour cuts in 28 events, cost him his Tour Card. He won the Nationwide Tour's Fresh Express Classic at TPC Stonebrae in 2011. Chopra regained his PGA Tour card for 2012 after finishing 19th on the money list. He finished 188th on the Tour's money list and went back to the newly renamed Web.com Tour for 2013. He finished 21st on the 2013 Web.com Tour regular season money list to earn his 2014 PGA Tour card. In 2013–14, he made only 2 cuts in 16 events and finished 249th on the FedEx Cup points list and lost his PGA Tour card.

In 2015, with limited status on either the PGA or Web.com Tour, Chopra won the Asian Tour's qualifying school.

Chopra became a regular part of Fox Sports' golf coverage.

== Awards, honors ==
In 1997, Chopra received Elit Sign number 111 by the Swedish Golf Federation on the basis of national team appearances and national championship performances.

In 2008, he was awarded honorary member of the PGA of Sweden.

== Amateur wins ==
- 1988 All India Junior Championship
- 1990 All India Junior Championship
- 1991 All India Junior Championship, Doug Sanders World Junior Championship

== Professional wins (14) ==
=== PGA Tour wins (2) ===
No.	Date	Tournament	Winning score	Margin of victory	Runner(s)-up
1	29 Oct 2007	Ginn sur Mer Classic	−19 (67-66-69-71=273)	1 stroke	(Sweden) Freddie Jacobson, (Japan) Shigeki Maruyama
2	6 Jan 2008	Mercedes-Benz Championship	−18 (69-72-67-66=274)	Playoff	(United States) Steve Stricker

PGA Tour playoff record (1–0)

No.	Year	Tournament	Opponent	Result
1	2008	Mercedes-Benz Championship	(United States) Steve Stricker	Won with birdie on fourth extra hole

=== Asian PGA Tour wins (1) ===
No.	Date	Tournament	Winning score	Margin of victory	Runner-up
1	9 Sep 2001	Mercuries Taiwan Masters	−4 (71-69-73-71=284)	1 stroke	(India) Vivek Bhandari

=== Asia Golf Circuit wins (1) ===
No.	Date	Tournament	Winning score	Margin of victory	Runner-up
1	9 Apr 1995	Chinfon Republic of China Open	−8 (73-65-70=208) (Note: Shortened to 54 holes due to weather.)	1 stroke	(Taiwan) Hsieh Chin-sheng

=== Nationwide Tour wins (3) ===
No.	Date	Tournament	Winning score	Margin of victory	Runner(s)-up
1	18 Apr 2004	First Tee Arkansas Classic	−13 (75-66-68-66=275)	1 stroke	(United States) John Elliott
2	23 May 2004	Henrico County Open	−30 (65-63-65-65=258)	4 strokes	(Australia) Nathan Green, (United States) Franklin Langham
3	17 Apr 2011	Fresh Express Classic	−12 (68-69-61=198)	1 stroke	(Scotland) Russell Knox, (United States) Luke List

=== Challenge Tour wins (2) ===
No.	Date	Tournament	Winning score	Margin of victory	Runner-up
1	24 Jul 1994	Jämtland Open	−9 (71-71-68=210)	1 stroke	(Sweden) Mats Hallberg
2	2 Oct 1994	Challenge Chargeurs	−16 (68-64-64-72=268)	9 strokes	(England) Stuart Little

=== Swedish Golf Tour wins (1) ===
No.	Date	Tournament	Winning score	Margin of victory	Runner-up
1	19 Sep 1993	Upsala Golf International	−4 (72-69-71=212)	3 strokes	(Sweden) Joakim Nilsson

=== Other wins (4) ===
- 1993 Johor Baru Open (Malaysia)
- 1994 Indian Masters, Malaysian PGA Championship, Indian PGA Championship

== Playoff record ==
European Tour playoff record (0–1)

No.	Year	Tournament	Opponent	Result
1	2007	MasterCard Masters	(Australia) Aaron Baddeley	Lost to par on fourth extra hole

== Results in major championships ==
Tournament	2004	2005	2006	2007	2008	2009
Masters Tournament					CUT	
U.S. Open	T24				T36	
The Open Championship		CUT				
PGA Championship			T41	CUT	CUT	

Tournament	2010	2011	2012	2013	2014	2015	2016	2017
Masters Tournament								
U.S. Open								CUT
The Open Championship			CUT					
PGA Championship								

Did not play

CUT = missed the half-way cut
"T" = tied

== Results in The Players Championship ==
Tournament	2005	2006	2007	2008	2009	2010
The Players Championship	T40	CUT	T44	T42	T14	CUT

CUT = missed the halfway cut
"T" indicates a tie for a place

== Results in World Golf Championships ==
Tournament	2008
Match Play	R64
Championship	T34
Invitational	T14

QF, R16, R32, R64 = Round in which player lost in match play
"T" = Tied

== See also ==
- 2003 PGA Tour Qualifying School graduates
- 2011 Nationwide Tour graduates
- 2013 Web.com Tour Finals graduates
