= 1990 Challenge Tour =

Golf tour season

1990 Challenge Tour season
- Duration: 21 March 1990 – 6 October 1990
- Number of official events: 30
- Most wins: (Italy) Giuseppe Calì (2) (France) Quentin Dabson (2) (Republic of Ireland) John McHenry (2)
- Rankings: (Italy) Giuseppe Calì

The 1990 Challenge Tour was the second season of the Challenge Tour, the official development tour to the European Tour.

== Schedule ==
The following table lists official events during the 1990 season.

| Date | Tournament | Host country | Purse (£) | Winner (Note: The number in brackets after each winner's name is the number of Challenge Tour events they had won up to and including that tournament. This information is only shown for Challenge Tour members. It is rare for someone to accumulate many wins on the Challenge Tour as success at this level usually leads to promotion to the European Tour.) | Notes |
|---|---|---|---|---|---|
| 23 Mar | Open Ercros 1 | Spain | Pta 3,500,000 | (England) Simon D. Hurley (2) | New to Challenge Tour |
| 7 Apr | Tessali Open | Italy | Lit 100,000,000 | (Italy) Emanuele Bolognesi (1) | |
| 4 May | Open Renault | Spain | Pta 3,500,000 | (England) Wayne Henry (1) | New to Challenge Tour |
| 12 May | Boggi Open | Italy | Lit 100,000,000 | (Republic of Ireland) John McHenry (1) | New tournament |
| 19 May | Open Ercros 2 | Spain | Pta 3,500,000 | (Spain) Ignacio Feliu (1) | New to Challenge Tour |
| 20 May | Ramlösa Open | Sweden | SKr 350,000 | (Sweden) Carl-Magnus Strömberg (2) | |
| 24 May | Prince's Challenge | England | 25,000 | (Scotland) Colin Gillies (1) | |
| 27 May | Jede Hot Cup Open | Sweden | SKr 250,000 | (Sweden) Peter Hedblom (1) | New tournament |
| 31 May | Barnham Broom Challenge | England | 25,000 | (Scotland) Colin Brooks (2) | |
| 3 Jun | FLA Open | Sweden | SKr 300,000 | (Sweden) Olle Nordberg (1) | |
| 9 Jun | Cerutti Open | Italy | Lit 80,000,000 | (Italy) Giuseppe Calì (1) | |
| 10 Jun | Open Vittel | France | 55,000 | (France) Michel Besanceney (1) | |
| 14 Jun | Bolton Old Links Challenge | England | 25,000 | (Australia) Ken Trimble (1) | |
| 16 Jun | Ercros Circuit 2 | Spain | Pta 3,500,000 | (Spain) Juan Rosa (1) | |
| 16 Jun | Martini Open | Italy | Lit 150,000,000 | (England) David James (1) | |
| 17 Jun | Stiga Open | Sweden | SKr 300,000 | (Sweden) Mats Hallberg (1) | |
| 23 Jun | Audi Open | Germany | 60,000 | (Australia) Brad King (1) | New tournament |
| 24 Jun | Open de Lyon | France | 55,000 | (France) Quentin Dabson (1) | |
| 1 Jul | Viking Open | Sweden | SKr 250,000 | (Sweden) Peter Carsbo (1) | New tournament |
| 8 Jul | Wermland Open | Sweden | SKr 525,000 | (Sweden) Joakim Haeggman (1) | |
| 8 Jul | Neuchâtel Open | Switzerland | CHF 100,000 | (Switzerland) André Bossert (1) | |
| 15 Jul | Scandinavian Tipo Trophy | Finland | SKr 300,000 | (Sweden) Fredrik Lindgren (1) | |
| 22 Jul | SM Match Play | Sweden | SKr 250,000 | (Republic of Ireland) Eoghan O'Connell (1) | |
| 5 Aug | Audi Quattro Trophy | Germany | 50,000 | (England) Nick Godin (2) | |
| 12 Aug | Gevalia Open | Sweden | SKr 400,000 | (Argentina) José Cantero (1) | |
| 26 Aug | Länsförsäkringar Open | Sweden | SKr 600,000 | (Sweden) Adam Mednick (1) | |
| 9 Sep | Västerås Open | Sweden | SKr 500,000 | (Sweden) Vilhelm Forsbrand (1) | |
| 15 Sep | Open Thyssen | Spain | Pta 3,500,000 | (Spain) Juan Carlos Piñero (1) | New to Challenge Tour |
| 16 Sep | SI Compaq Open | Sweden | SKr 500,000 | (Sweden) Jesper Parnevik (1) | |
| 23 Sep | Esab Open | Sweden | SKr 300,000 | (Argentina) Ricardo González (1) | |
| 6 Oct | Open Alcatel | Spain | Pta 3,500,000 | (Wales) David Wood (1) | New to Challenge Tour |

=== Unofficial events ===
The following events were sanctioned by the Challenge Tour, but did not carry official money, wins were still official however.

| Date | Tournament | Host country | Purse (£) | Winner | Notes |
|---|---|---|---|---|---|
| 24 Jun | Memorial Olivier Barras | Switzerland | CHF 50,000 | (Italy) Giuseppe Calì (2) | |
| 20 Jul | Leman Pro-Am | Switzerland | CHF 125,000 | (France) Quentin Dabson (2) | New tournament |
| 18 Aug | Rolex Pro-Am | Switzerland | CHF 100,000 | (Republic of Ireland) John McHenry (2) | |
| 19 Aug | Teleannons Grand Prix | Sweden | SKr 415,000 | (Sweden) Mikael Högberg (1) | |
| 9 Sep | Brussels Pro-Am | Belgium | 60,000 | (England) Philip Golding (1) | New tournament |

== Rankings ==
The rankings were based on prize money won during the season, calculated in Pound sterling. The top five players on the rankings earned status to play on the 1991 European Tour (Volvo Tour).

| Rank | Player | Prize money (£) |
|---|---|---|
| 1 | (Italy) Giuseppe Calì | 28,383 |
| 2 | (Republic of Ireland) Eoghan O'Connell | 24,848 |
| 3 | (England) David James | 24,619 |
| 4 | (Sweden) Mikael Högberg | 23,900 |
| 5 | (France) Quentin Dabson | 21,832 |

== See also ==
- 1990 Swedish Golf Tour
