= Fredrik Larsson (golfer) =

Swedish golfer

Personal information
- Full name: Fredrik Larsson
- Nationality: Sweden
- Born: 13 August 1968 (age 58) Umeå, Sweden
- Height: 1.81 m (5 ft 11 in)
- Weight: 84 kg (185 lb; 13.2 st)

Career
- Sport: Golf
- Turned professional: 1989
- Former tours: European Tour; Challenge Tour
- Professional wins: 4

Number of wins by tour
- Challenge Tour: 3
- Other: 1

Achievements and awards
- Swedish Golf Tour Order of Merit winner: 1998

Fredrik Larsson (born 13 August 1968) is a Swedish professional golfer.

Larsson played on the Challenge Tour 1990–2000 where he enjoyed success, winning four times 1991–1993, putting him on the list of golfers with most Challenge Tour wins. He was also runner-up at the 1998 NCC Open, 1998 Volvo Finnish Open, 1996 Telia InfoMedia Grand Prix, 1993 SIAB Open and the 1992 Milano Open.

Larsson played on the European Tour in 1994 where his best result was a tie for 19th at the Johnnie Walker Classic in Thailand.

== Professional wins (4) ==
=== Challenge Tour wins (3) ===
No.	Date	Tournament	Winning score	Margin of victory	Runner-up
1	19 May 1991	Ramlösa Open	−6 (73-69-72-68=282)	4 strokes	(Argentina) Rubén Alvarez
2	14 Jul 1991	Volvo Finnish Open	−7 (67-71-71=209)	Playoff	(Sweden) Jarmo Sandelin
3	22 Aug 1993	Open de Divonne	−13 (73-68-62-72=275)	2 strokes	(England) Liam White

Challenge Tour playoff record (1–1)

No.	Year	Tournament	Opponent	Result
1	1991	Volvo Finnish Open	(Sweden) Jarmo Sandelin	Won with birdie on fifth extra hole
2	1992	Milano Open	(England) Nick Godin	Lost to par on fourth extra hole

=== Other wins (1) ===
- 1993 Open de Mont Griffon

== See also ==
- List of golfers with most Challenge Tour wins
