= Peter Carsbo =

Swedish professional golfer

Personal information
- Nationality: Sweden
- Born: 23 July 1959 (age 67)

Career
- Sport: Golf
- Turned professional: 1984
- Former tours: European Tour; Swedish Golf Tour
- Professional wins: 1

Number of wins by tour
- Challenge Tour: 1

Peter Carsbo (born 23 July 1959) is a Swedish professional golfer, winner of the Viking Open on the 1990 Challenge Tour.

== Career ==
Carsbo turned professional in 1984 and played on the Swedish Golf Tour where he was runner-up at several tournaments, including the 1987 Esab Open and 1988 Stiga Open. He was semi-finalist at the 1990 SM Match.

In 1987 he was part of the Swedish team that was runner-up at the Europcar Cup, together with Johan Ryström, Carl-Magnus Strömberg and Magnus Sunesson.

His best season on the European Tour was in 1987 when he made five cuts in 12 starts and finished 159th in the Order of Merit.

== Professional wins (1) ==
=== Challenge Tour wins (1) ===
| No. | Date | Tournament | Winning score | Margin of victory | Runner-up |
|---|---|---|---|---|---|
| 1 | 1 Jul 1990 | Viking Open | −6 (72-67-71=210) | 1 stroke | (Wales) Huw Davies-Thomas |

== Team appearances ==
Professional

- Europcar Cup (representing Sweden): 1987
