= Pierre Fulke =

Swedish professional golfer (born 1971)

Personal information
- Full name: Pierre Olof Fulke
- Nationality: Sweden
- Born: 21 February 1971 (age 55) Nyköping, Sweden
- Height: 1.74 m (5 ft 9 in)
- Spouse: Sandra Tancred Fulke

Career
- Sport: Golf
- Turned professional: 1989
- Former tour: European Tour
- Professional wins: 5
- Highest ranking: 26 (11 February 2001)

Number of wins by tour
- European Tour: 3
- Challenge Tour: 2

Best results in major championships
- Masters Tournament: CUT: 2001
- PGA Championship: T10: 2002
- U.S. Open: WD: 2001
- The Open Championship: T7: 2000

Pierre Olof Fulke (born 21 February 1971) is a Swedish professional golfer who played on the European Tour.

== Early life and amateur career ==
In 1971, Fulke was born in Nyköping. He came to represent Eksjö Golf Club, situated in the province of Småland in Sweden, through his entire career.

14 years old, he qualified for the 1985 unofficial Swedish Youth Championship (Colgate Cup) at his age level and finished 8th.

He represented Sweden twice at the European Boys' Team Championship and the continent of Europe once at Jacques Léglise Trophy.

== Professional career ==
He turned professional before the 1990 season, only 18 years old, and began playing on the Swedish Golf Tour, at the time co-sanctioned by the newly founded European second tier Challenge Tour. In May 1990, he reached a third-place finish in an international field at the Ramlösa Open at Vasatorp Golf Club, Helsingborg.

In 1992, Fulke won twice on the Challenge Tour, to qualify for membership of the main European Tour.

The first of Fulke's three European Tour wins came at the 1999 Lancome Trophy in September at Saint-Nom-la-Bretèche south of Paris, France. He became the 13th Swedish winner on the European Tour, earning the 35th title by a Swedish player. The tournament took place the week before the 1999 Ryder Cup in America, why Fulke's victory came to late to earn him a chance to qualify for the European team. However, his success continued the next season, which enabled him to qualify for the next Ryder Cup.

During the 2000 season, he won the Scottish PGA Championship and the Volvo Masters and finished 12th on the European Tour Order of Merit. After winning the Volvo Masters title, one of his shots was appointed "The 2000 European Tour Shot of the Year".

After a second-place finish at the WGC-Accenture Match Play Championship in Australia in February 2001, Fulke reached a career best 26th in the Official World Golf Ranking. He kept his place for the European team at the next Ryder Cup match, originally scheduled for 28–30 September 2001. Following the September 11 attacks, the event was postponed for a year and it was agreed to take place in September 2002, with the same players as originally decided. The European team, won 15½−12½ over the United States team at The Belfry, England, and Fulke contributed by halving his Sunday singles match against Davis Love III.

In 2004, Fulke slipped to 134th place on the Order of Merit, but he retained his tour card for 2005 thanks to a five-year exemption for his Volvo Masters victory. In 2005, he recovered some of his form and finished 49th on the Order of Merit. He missed the majority of the 2006 season through injury and in 2007 he announced that he was retiring from tournament golf to concentrate on golf course design.

After his playing career, Fulke became one of Sweden's most respected golf course architects. He has worked together with fellow countryman, former European Tour player and tournament winner, Adam Mednickson. Fulke designed or redesigned 8 of the top 32 courses in the 2020 ranking, by the magazine Svensk Golf, of the 50 best golf courses in Sweden, including the top ranked course Visby Golf Club at the island Gotland.

== Awards and honors ==
- In 1997, Fulke earned Elite Sign No. 110 by the Swedish Golf Federation, on the basis of national team appearances and national championship performances.
- In 2003, the three Swedish teammates of the victorious European Ryder Cup team the previous year, Niclas Fasth, Fulke and Jesper Parnevik, was each, by the Swedish Golf Federation, awarded the Golden Club, the highest award for contributions to Swedish golf, as the 30th, 31st and 32nd recipients.
- In 2003, Fulke was awarded honorary member of the PGA of Sweden.

== Personal life ==
Fulke also found interest in playing golf with hickory sticks and once, 2007, won the Swedish Hickory Championship.

He resides in Ormaryd, west of the city of Eksjö in the province of Småland, Sweden.

== Professional wins (5) ==
=== European Tour wins (3) ===
Legend
Tour Championships (1)
Other European Tour (2)

No.	Date	Tournament	Winning score	Margin of victory	Runner-up
1	19 Sep 1999	Trophée Lancôme	−14 (69-69-65-67=270)	1 stroke	(Spain) Ignacio Garrido
2	27 Aug 2000	Scottish PGA Championship	−17 (70-63-68-70=271)	2 strokes	(Sweden) Henrik Nyström
3	5 Nov 2000	Volvo Masters	−16 (67-68-70-67=272)	1 stroke	(Northern Ireland) Darren Clarke

=== Challenge Tour wins (2) ===
No.	Date	Tournament	Winning score	Margin of victory	Runner(s)-up
1	10 May 1992	Audi Quattro Trophy	−18 (66-66-70-68=270)	1 stroke	(France) Michel Besanceney, (Sweden) Anders Gillner
2	14 Jun 1992	Stiga Open	−15 (70-69-68-66=273)	1 stroke	(Sweden) Mats Hallberg

== Results in major championships ==
Tournament	1994	1995	1996	1997	1998	1999	2000	2001	2002	2003
Masters Tournament								CUT		
U.S. Open								WD		
The Open Championship	CUT			CUT		T30	T7	T62	T28	T15
PGA Championship								CUT	T10	CUT

Top 10
Did not play

CUT = missed the half-way cut
WD = Withdrew
"T" = tied

=== Summary ===
Tournament	Wins	2nd	3rd	Top-5	Top-10	Top-25	Events	Cuts made
Masters Tournament	0	0	0	0	0	0	1	0
U.S. Open	0	0	0	0	0	0	1	0
The Open Championship	0	0	0	0	1	2	7	5
PGA Championship	0	0	0	0	1	1	3	1
Totals	0	0	0	0	2	3	12	6

- Most consecutive cuts made – 3 (2002 Open Championship – 2003 Open Championship)
- Longest streak of top-10s – 1 (twice)

== Results in World Golf Championships ==
Tournament	2000	2001	2002	2003	2004
Match Play		2	R64		
Championship	T42	NT^{1}			
Invitational		T17	T42	T67	75

^{1}Cancelled due to 9/11

Did not play

"T" = Tied
QF, R16, R32, R64 = Round in which player lost in match play
NT = No tournament

== Team appearances ==
Amateur

- European Boys' Team Championship (representing Sweden): 1988, 1989
- Jacques Léglise Trophy (representing the Continent of Europe): 1988

Professional

- WGC-World Cup (representing Sweden): 2000
- Ryder Cup (representing Europe): 2002 (winners)
