= Tournoi Perrier de Paris (Challenge Tour) =

Tournament information
- Location: Paris, France
- Established: 1993
- Course: Golf Disneyland
- Par: 72
- Tour: Challenge Tour
- Format: Stroke play
- Prize fund: £130,000
- Month played: May
- Final year: 1993

Tournament record score
- Aggregate: 275 Phil Mickelson (1993)
- To par: −13 as above

Final champion
- (United States) Phil Mickelson
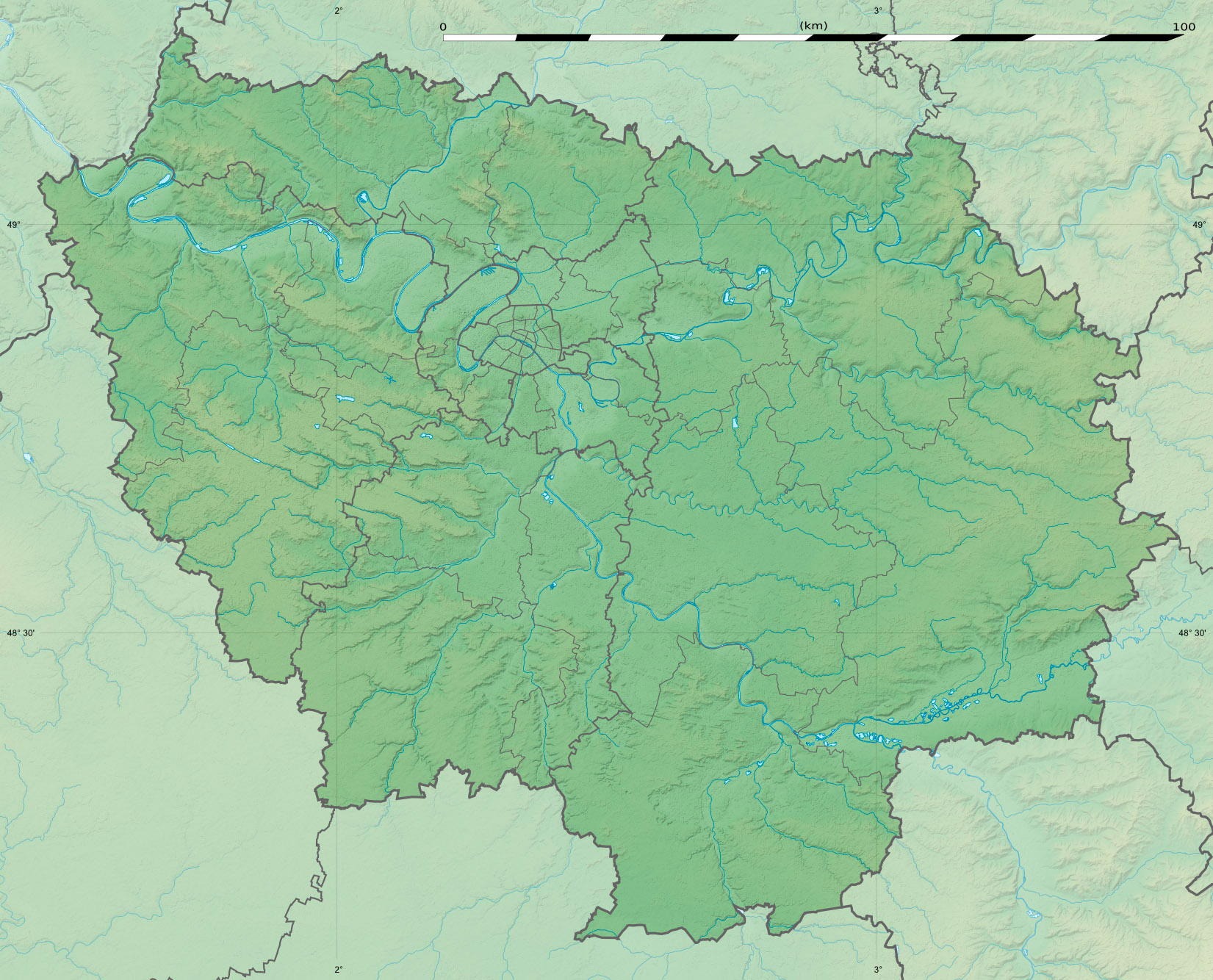
- Location in France Location in Île-de-France

The Tournoi Perrier de Paris was a golf tournament on the Challenge Tour in 1993. It was played at Golf Euro Disney near Paris, France. It was won by future multiple major winner Phil Mickelson.

== Winners ==
Year	Winner	Score	To par	Margin of victory	Runner-up
1993	(United States) Phil Mickelson	275	−13	1 stroke	(Australia) Steve Elkington
