= Steven Bottomley =

English professional golfer

Personal information
- Full name: Steven Mark Bottomley
- Nickname: Botts
- Nationality: England
- Born: 15 February 1965 (age 61) Bradford, England
- Height: 5 ft 10 in (1.78 m)
- Weight: 190 lb (86 kg; 14 st)
- Spouse: Alison Jane Bottomley
- Children: 1

Career
- Sport: Golf
- Turned professional: 1987
- Former tours: European Tour; Challenge Tour
- Professional wins: 2

Number of wins by tour
- Challenge Tour: 1
- Other: 1

Best results in major championships
- Masters Tournament: DNP
- PGA Championship: DNP
- U.S. Open: DNP
- The Open Championship: T3: 1995

Steven Mark Bottomley (born 15 February 1965) is an English professional golfer.

== Career ==
Bottomley spent eight seasons on the European Tour. His best season was in 1995, due in large part to his third place finish at the 1995 Open, where he finished 64th on the money list.

Bottomley's most notable finish was a tie for 3rd place at the 1995 Open Championship. Bottomley earned his spot at the Open by way of a qualifier. He was the only player to shoot below 70 in the final round and spent an hour as the clubhouse leader. Ultimately, he finished one stroke back of a playoff. The 1995 Open was held at Old Course at St Andrews and in his life Bottomley has only played six rounds at the Old Course, four of which being the rounds at the 1995 Open.

== Professional wins (2) ==
=== Challenge Tour wins (1) ===
No.	Date	Tournament	Winning score	Margin of victory	Runners-up
1	16 Aug 1992	Länsförsäkringar Open	−3 (72-69-71-69=281)	Playoff	(Australia) Chris Gray, (United States) Brian Nelson

Challenge Tour playoff record (1–0)

No.	Year	Tournament	Opponents	Result
1	1992	Länsförsäkringar Open	(Australia) Chris Gray, (United States) Brian Nelson	Won with par on second extra hole Nelson eliminated by par on first hole

=== Other wins (1) ===
No.	Date	Tournament	Winning score	Margin of victory	Runners-up
1	20 Oct 1996	Open Novotel Perrier (with (England) Jonathan Lomas)	−23 (63-62-68-139=332)	1 stroke	(England) Richard Boxall and (England) Derrick Cooper

== Results in major championships ==
Tournament	1987	1988	1989	1990	1991	1992	1993	1994	1995	1996	1997
The Open Championship	CUT								T3	CUT	CUT

Note: Bottomley only played in The Open Championship.

Top 10
Did not play

CUT = missed the half-way cut
"T" indicates a tie for a place

== Team appearances ==
Amateur

- European Youths' Team Championship (representing England): 1984
