= Upsala Golf International =

Tournament information
- Location: Uppsala, Sweden
- Established: 1991
- Course: Upsala Golf Club
- Par: 72
- Tours: Challenge Tour; Swedish Golf Tour
- Format: Stroke play
- Prize fund: kr 200,000
- Final year: 1993

Tournament record score
- Aggregate: 209 Tony Edlund (1992)
- To par: −7 as above

Final champion
- (Sweden) Daniel Chopra

Location map
- Location in Sweden

The Upsala Golf International was a golf tournament on the Swedish Golf Tour 1991–1993 and featured on the Challenge Tour in 1991 and 1992. It was played in Uppsala, 60 km north of Stockholm, Sweden.

The 1993 edition doubled as the Swedish International Stroke Play Championship, which was held at Upsala GC also in 2003 and 2004. The club, founded in 1937, uses the archaic spelling of Uppsala, Upsala.

== Winners ==
Year	Tour (Note: CHA − Challenge Tour; SWE − Swedish Golf Tour.)	Winner	Score	To par	Margin of victory	Runner(s)-up	Ref.
1993	SWE	(Sweden) Daniel Chopra	212	−4	3 strokes	(Sweden) Joakim Nilsson	
1992	CHA	(Sweden) Tony Edlund	209	−7	2 strokes	(Norway) Per Haugsrud	
1991	CHA	(Sweden) Peter Hedblom	211	−2	1 stroke	(United States) Chris Cookson (Sweden) Fredrik Almskoug	
