= Raymond Burns (golfer) =

Northern Irish professional golfer (born 1973)

Personal information
- Nickname: Raymie
- Nationality: Northern Ireland
- Born: 8 October 1973 (age 53) Banbridge, Northern Ireland
- Height: 5 ft 8 in (1.73 m)

Career
- Sport: Golf
- Turned professional: 1993
- Former tours: European Tour; Challenge Tour
- Professional wins: 2

Number of wins by tour
- Challenge Tour: 2

Achievements and awards
- Challenge Tour Rankings winner: 1994

Raymond Burns (born 8 October 1973) is a Northern Irish professional golfer.

== Early life ==
Burns was born in Banbridge, County Down. In 1993, he represented Great Britain and Ireland in the Walker Cup.

== Professional career ==
In 1993, Burns turned pro. He missed out on qualifying for the European Tour at qualifying school at the end of 1993, and decided to play on the second tier Challenge Tour in 1994. During his rookie season, he secured two victories and topped the Challenge Tour rankings, thereby earning his place on the European Tour for 1995.

Burns finished 8th on his European Tour début at the Dubai Desert Classic and maintained his place on the European Tour through the end of the 1998 season. A loss of form that season saw him return to the Challenge Tour in 1999, where he again struggled, failing to make the cut in any of his 11 starts.

After leaving the tour, Burns qualified as a teaching professional before attempting to return to tournament golf during the early to mid-2000s. Since 2006 has worked as the head professional at South County Golf Club.

== Professional wins (2) ==
=== Challenge Tour wins (2) ===
No.	Date	Tournament	Winning score	Margin of victory	Runner(s)-up
1	28 May 1994	Club Med Open	−11 (67-74-70-66=277)	1 stroke	(France) Christian Cévaër, (France) Pascal Edmond, (United States) Robert Huxtable
2	21 Aug 1994	Karsten Ping Norwegian Challenge	−16 (69-69-67-71=276)	3 strokes	(England) Jamie Taylor

== Team appearances ==
Amateur

- Jacques Léglise Trophy (representing Great Britain & Ireland): 1989 (winners), 1990 (winners), 1991 (winners)
- St Andrews Trophy (representing Great Britain & Ireland): 1992 (winners)
- Eisenhower Trophy (representing Great Britain & Ireland): 1992
- Walker Cup (representing Great Britain & Ireland): 1993
- European Amateur Team Championship (representing Ireland): 1993
