= Viking Open =

Tournament information
- Location: Kode, Sweden
- Established: 1990
- Course: Kungälv-Kode Golf Club
- Par: 72
- Tour: Challenge Tour
- Format: Stroke play
- Prize fund: £25,000
- Final year: 1991

Tournament record score
- Aggregate: 207 José Cantero (1991)
- To par: −9 as above

Final champion
- (Argentina) José Cantero

Location map
- Location in Sweden

The Viking Open was a golf tournament on the Swedish Golf Tour and the Challenge Tour in 1990 and 1991. It was played in Kode, Kungälv Municipality, 30 km north of Gothenburg, Sweden.

The tournament was held at Kungälv-Kode Golf Club, on a course just completed in June 1990, including a signature 660 m par-6 hole.

== Winners ==
Year	Winner	Score	To par	Margin of victory	Runner-up	Ref.
1991	(Argentina) José Cantero	207	−9	3 strokes	(Sweden) Magnus Jönsson	
1990	(Sweden) Peter Carsbo	210	−6	1 stroke	(Wales) Huw Davies-Thomas	
