= 1992 Challenge Tour =

Golf tour season

1992 Challenge Tour season
- Duration: 5 December 1991 – 27 September 1992
- Number of official events: 34
- Most wins: (Sweden) Mikael Krantz (3)
- Rankings: (Wales) Paul Affleck

The 1992 Challenge Tour was the fourth season of the Challenge Tour, the official development tour to the European Tour.

== Schedule ==
The following table lists official events during the 1992 season.

Date	Tournament	Host country	Purse (£)	Winner (Note: The number in brackets after each winner's name is the number of Challenge Tour events they had won up to and including that tournament. This information is only shown for Challenge Tour members. It is rare for someone to accumulate many wins on the Challenge Tour as success at this level usually leads to promotion to the European Tour.)	Notes
8 Dec	Ivory Coast Open	Ivory Coast	80,000	(France) Michel Besanceney (2)	
15 Dec	Nigerian Open	Nigeria	105,000	(Sierra Leone) James Lebbie (1)	
12 Jan	Zimbabwe Open	Zimbabwe	45,000	(Zimbabwe) Mark McNulty (n/a)	
19 Jan	Zambia Open	Zambia	75,000	(England) Jeremy Robinson (4)	
26 Jan	Standard Chartered Kenya Open	Kenya	75,000	(Switzerland) André Bossert (2)	
12 Apr	Tessali Open	Italy	Lit 100,000,000	(Sweden) Anders Gillner (3)	
3 May	Challenge Dumez	France	50,000	(England) Jonathan Lomas (1)	New tournament
10 May	Audi Quattro Trophy	Germany	50,000	(Sweden) Pierre Fulke (1)	
16 May	Liebig Ligurian Open	Italy	Lit 120,000,000	(England) Nick Godin (3)	New tournament
17 May	Challenge Chargeurs	France	45,000	(France) Géry Watine (1)	New tournament
24 May	Open Vittel	France	55,000	(Chile) Roy Mackenzie (1)	
24 May	Ramlösa Open	Sweden	SKr 400,000	(Sweden) Magnus Jönsson (1)	
31 May	Open de Dijon Bourgogne	France	50,000	(England) Jeremy Robinson (5)	
31 May	SIAB Open	Sweden	SKr 350,000	(Sweden) Mikael Krantz (2)	
6 Jun	Club Med Open	Italy	Lit 130,000,000	(Wales) Mark Litton (1)	
12 Jun	Clydesdale Bank Northern Open	Scotland	25,000	(Scotland) Peter Smith (1)	
14 Jun	Stiga Open	Sweden	SKr 350,000	(Sweden) Pierre Fulke (2)	
21 Jun	Milano Open	Italy	Lit 150,000,000	(England) Nick Godin (4)	
5 Jul	Bank Austria Open	Austria	50,000	(Wales) Stephen Dodd (1)	New tournament
12 Jul	Volvo Finnish Open	Finland	SKr 350,000	(Sweden) Henrik Bergquist (1)	
17 Jul	Pro-Am Moet & Chandon du Leman	Switzerland	CHF 100,000	(France) Tim Planchin (1)	
26 Jul	Open des Volcans	France	60,000	(Sweden) Mikael Krantz (3)	New tournament
30 Jul	Quietwaters Challenge	England	35,000	(England) Craig Cassells (2)	New tournament
9 Aug	SI Compaq Open	Sweden	SKr 800,000	(Sweden) Joakim Haeggman (2)	
16 Aug	Länsförsäkringar Open	Sweden	SKr 525,000	(England) Steven Bottomley (1)	
21 Aug	East Sussex National Challenge	England	30,000	(England) Simon D. Hurley (3)	New tournament
23 Aug	SM Match Play	Sweden	SKr 300,000	(Argentina) José Cantero (3)	
30 Aug	Audi Open	Germany	55,000	(Wales) Paul Affleck (1)	
30 Aug	Västerås Open	Sweden	SKr 225,000	(Sweden) Joakim Rask (1)	
4 Sep	Gore-Tex Fabrics Challenge	Scotland	30,000	(United States) Brian Nelson (1)	
6 Sep	Omnium Bayer	France	45,000	(Spain) Jesús María Arruti (1)	New tournament
13 Sep	Playboy Charity Challenge	Czech Republic	50,000	(Australia) Lucien Tinkler (1)	New tournament
13 Sep	Upsala Golf International	Sweden	SKr 300,000	(Sweden) Tony Edlund (1)	
26 Sep	Challenge Novotel	France	45,000	(Sweden) Mikael Krantz (4)	New tournament
27 Sep	Dutch Challenge Open	Netherlands	ƒ170,000	(England) John Coe (1)	New tournament

=== Unofficial events ===
The following events were sanctioned by the Challenge Tour, but did not carry official money, wins were still official however.

Date	Tournament	Host country	Purse (£)	Winner	Notes
28 Jun	Memorial Olivier Barras	Switzerland	CHF 50,000	(England) Jeff Hall (2)	
12 Jul	Neuchâtel Open SBS Trophy	Switzerland	CHF 100,000	(Germany) Heinz-Peter Thül (3)	
8 Aug	Rolex Pro-Am	Switzerland	CHF 100,000	(United States) Ronald Stelten (2)	
30 Aug	Perrier European Pro-Am	Belgium	50,000	(Sweden) Magnus Persson (1)	
3 Oct	Bulles Laurent Perrier	France	30,000	(France) Géry Watine (2)	

== Rankings ==
The rankings were based on prize money won during the season, calculated in Pound sterling. The top 10 players on the rankings earned status to play on the 1993 European Tour (Volvo Tour).

Rank	Player	Prize money (£)
1	(Wales) Paul Affleck	39,768
2	(France) Michel Besanceney	34,112
3	(England) Paul Eales	32,768
4	(England) Nick Godin	29,960
5	(England) Craig Cassells	29,474

== See also ==
- 1992 Swedish Golf Tour
