= Jede Hot Cup Open =

1990s golf tournament in Sweden

Tournament information
- Location: Mariestad, Sweden
- Established: 1990
- Course: Mariestad Golf Club
- Par: 72
- Tour: Challenge Tour
- Format: Stroke play
- Prize fund: £25,000
- Final year: 1991

Tournament record score
- Aggregate: 213 Peter Hedblom; 213 Mats Hallberg (1992)
- To par: −3 as above

Final champion
- (Sweden) Mats Hallberg

Location map
- Location in Sweden

The Jede Hot Cup Open was a golf tournament on the Swedish Golf Tour and the Challenge Tour in 1990 and 1991. It was played in Mariestad, Sweden.

The tournament was held at Mariestad Golf Club, on a course along Lake Vänern completed in 1984 where Kasper Hedblom, son of 1990 winner Peter Hedblom, set a new course record of 65 in 2015.

== Winners ==
Year	Winner	Score	To par	Margin of victory	Runner(s)-up	Ref.
1991	(Sweden) Mats Hallberg	213	−3	2 strokes	(Argentina) Rubén Alvarez (Sweden) Olle Karlsson (Sweden) Fredrik C. Lundgren (Sweden) Thomas Nilsson (Sweden) Jan Tilmanis	
1990	(Sweden) Peter Hedblom	213	−3	1 stroke	(Sweden) Robert Karlsson	
