= Klas Eriksson =

Swedish professional golfer

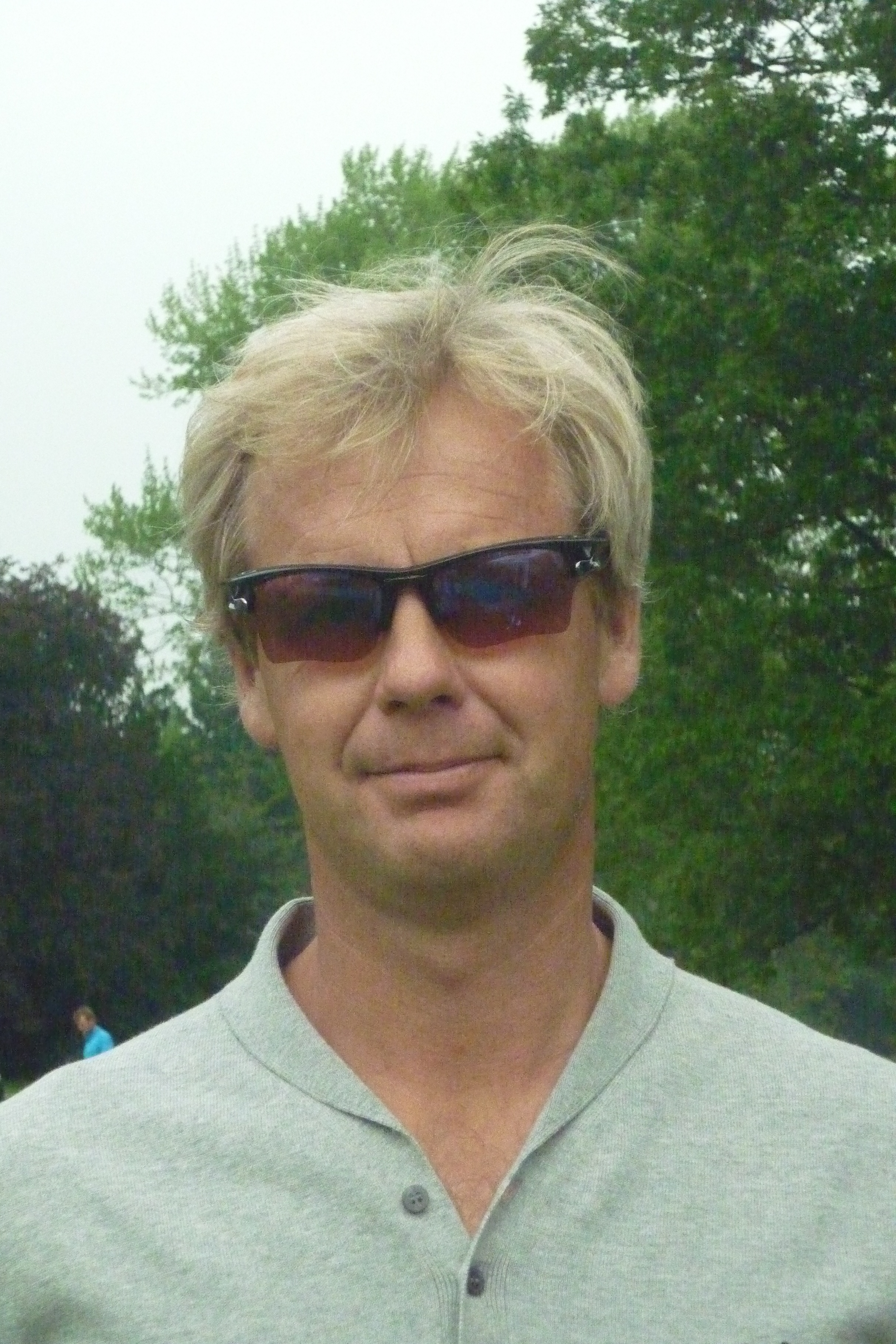

Personal information
- Nationality: Sweden
- Born: 30 July 1971 (age 55) Växjö, Sweden
- Height: 1.83 m (6 ft 0 in)
- Spouse: Marina (m. 2004)
- Children: 2

Career
- Sport: Golf
- Turned professional: 1991
- Former tours: European Tour; Challenge Tour
- Professional wins: 5

Number of wins by tour
- Challenge Tour: 5 (Tied-8th all-time)

Best results in major championships
- Masters Tournament: DNP
- PGA Championship: DNP
- U.S. Open: DNP
- The Open Championship: T41: 1996

Achievements and awards
- Challenge Tour Rankings winner: 1993

Klas Eriksson (born 30 July 1971) is a Swedish professional golfer.

== Career ==
Eriksson was born in Växjö and turned professional in 1991 having won the European Amateur and the French Amateur Stoke Play Championship the previous year. He finished 45th on the Order of Merit in his rookie season, but injuries and putting problems meant he failed to retain his card at the end of the 1998 season and he was back on the Challenge Tour in 1999.

Eriksson graduated from the Challenge Tour for a second time in 2001 by finishing 7th on the Rankings having won for the fourth time on the tour at the Talma Finnish Challenge. He maintained his playing status on the European Tour for four seasons before again returning to the Challenge Tour. In 2008 he won his fifth Challenge Tour title at the Trophée du Golf Club de Genève as he secured promotion to the top level for the third time. In 2009 he again failed to win sufficient money to retain his European Tour card and was back on the Challenge Tour in 2010.

== Amateur wins ==
- 1990 European Amateur, Coupe Murat (French Open Amateur Stroke Play Championship)

== Professional wins (5) ==
=== Challenge Tour wins (5) ===
No.	Date	Tournament	Winning score	Margin of victory	Runner(s)-up
1	29 Mar 1993	Club Med Open	−10 (71-68-70-69=278)	2 strokes	(England) Neal Briggs
2	4 Jul 1993	Bank Austria Open	−10 (69-72-70-67=278)	1 stroke	(Northern Ireland) Stephen Hamill, (France) Jean-François Remésy
3	26 Sep 1993	Challenge Novotel	−12 (68-69-70-69=276)	1 stroke	(France) Michel Besanceney
4	12 Aug 2001	Talma Finnish Challenge	−16 (69-72-66-65=272)	4 strokes	(England) Gary Clark
5	17 Aug 2008	Trophée du Golf Club de Genève	−14 (68-70-73-63=274)	Playoff	(Netherlands) Wil Besseling, (Brazil) Alexandre Rocha

Challenge Tour playoff record (1–1)

No.	Year	Tournament	Opponents	Result
1	1999	NCC Open	(Denmark) Thomas Nørret, (Sweden) Per G. Nyman	Nyman won with bogey on second extra hole Nørret eliminated by par on first hole
2	2008	Trophée du Golf Club de Genève	(Netherlands) Wil Besseling, (Brazil) Alexandre Rocha	Won with birdie on fourth extra hole Rocha eliminated by par on third hole

== Results in major championships ==
Tournament	1996	1997	1998	1999	2000	2001	2002	2003	2004
The Open Championship	T41	CUT							CUT

Note: Eriksson only played in The Open Championship.

Did not play

CUT = missed the half-way cut
"T" = tied

== Team appearances ==
Amateur

- Eisenhower Trophy (representing Sweden): 1990 (winners)
- St Andrews Trophy (representing the Continent of Europe): 1990
- European Amateur Team Championship (representing Sweden): 1991

== See also ==
- 2008 Challenge Tour graduates
- List of golfers with most Challenge Tour wins
