= Peter Hedblom =

Swedish professional golfer

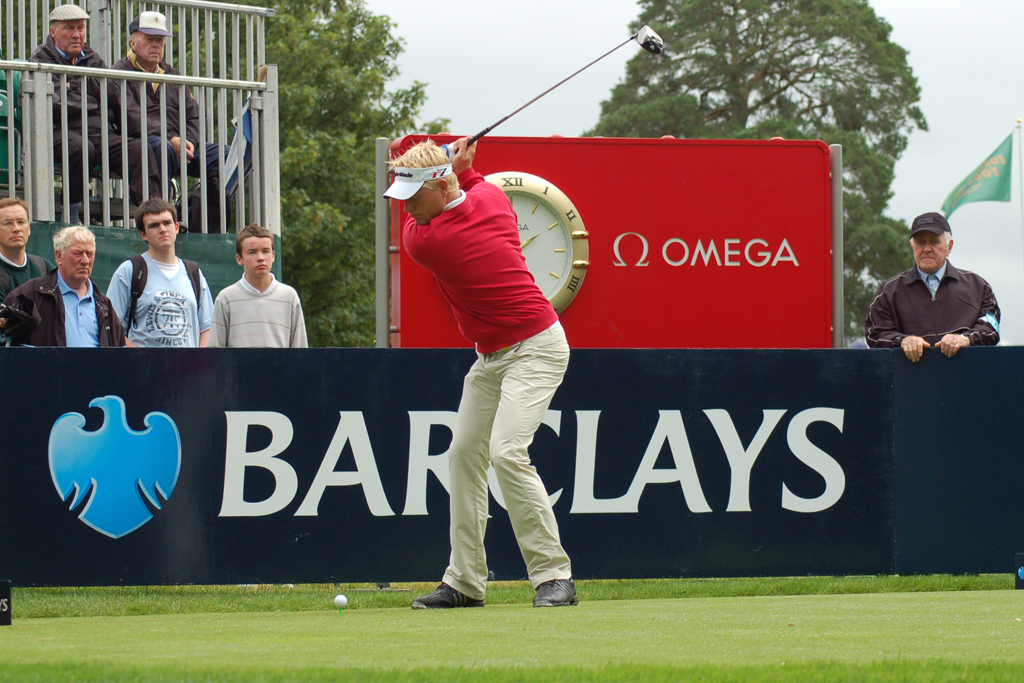
- Hedblom at the 2006 Barclays Scottish Open

Personal information
- Full name: Peter Mikael Hedblom
- Nationality: Sweden
- Born: 20 January 1970 (age 56) Gävle, Sweden
- Height: 1.83 m (6 ft 0 in)
- Weight: 87 kg (192 lb; 13.7 st)
- Spouse: Anna (m. 1999)
- Children: 3

Career
- Sport: Golf
- Turned professional: 1988
- Former tours: European Tour; Challenge Tour
- Professional wins: 9
- Highest ranking: 77 (2 November 2008)

Number of wins by tour
- European Tour: 3
- Asian Tour: 1
- Challenge Tour: 4
- Other: 2

Best results in major championships
- Masters Tournament: DNP
- PGA Championship: CUT: 2008
- U.S. Open: T11: 2005
- The Open Championship: T7: 1996

Peter Mikael Hedblom (born 20 January 1970) is a Swedish professional golfer. He won three times on the European Tour and lost in playoffs four times. He finished tied 7th at the 1996 Open Championship.

== Early life ==
In 1970, Hedblom was born in Gävle, Sweden. When he was just a few years old, he followed his father Olle, a former bandy player, who later became a golf club professional, to the golf course at Gävle Golf Club. Peter became a member at seven and early showed great talent, but was actively involved in ice hockey before that. His younger sister Marlene did not start her golfing career until the age of 12, but also later became a tournament professional. Through their early careers, the two siblings were supported by their parents, Olle and Agneta.

His father Olle was an elite player himself and once won the Scandinavian Foursome, together with best friend William Löfqvist, who was a well-known goaltender of the Swedish national ice hockey team and one of the best golfers in northern Sweden. However, Olle's own career was interrupted by a serious leg injury, when he as a bandy coach ran into the ice after the game, to talk to the referee, but was hit by the ice machine. Olle's priority became supporting the golf careers of his children

In 1981, at the age of 11, Hedblom won the unofficial Swedish youth championship, Bankboken Cup, at his age level and again in 1984 at the next level.

Hedblom and his father won the Swedish Father and Son Championship four years in a row 1985–1988.

== Amateur career ==
In 1987, Hedblom won the Swedish Boys under-19 Championship. The following year he won the Doral Junior Classic in the United States and the Nordic Championship. At his home course he shot an eight under par 28 on the last nine, to win the Junior District Championship by a big margin.

He was a member of the Continental Europe team that won the 1986 Jacques Léglise Trophy and also played in the event in 1987.

In 1988, Hedblom finished second in the Swedish Junior Stroke-play Championship.

== Professional career ==
In 1988, he turned professional. Hedblom has played mainly on the European Tour, on which he has won three tournaments. His best year-end ranking on the Order of Merit was 29th in 2008. His first win on the European Tour was at the 1996 Moroccan Open.

As a 20-year-old, he qualified for his first Open Championship in 1990, but did not make the cut. In 1996, he qualified for his third Open, to take place at Royal Lytham & St Annes Golf Club, England 18–21 July. In the second round, Hedblom tied the course record 65 and played in the next to last group on Saturday with Jack Nicklaus. Hedblom finally finished a career major championship best, tied 7th, six strokes from winner Tom Lehman.

Hedblom didn't win on the tour again until 2007 when he was victorious at the Maybank Malaysian Open, which was co-sanctioned with the Asian Tour. He picked up his third win at the 2009 Johnnie Walker Championship at Gleneagles, Scotland, his first tour title on European soil, a reward for him, who lost a play-off – the fourth of his career – the previous week in the KLM Open.

During his career, he has also won four tournaments on the Challenge Tour.

He represented Sweden in the 1996 Dunhill Cup, where Sweden advanced to the semifinal, where they lost to the tournament-winning United States team and tied third.

== Personal life ==
Hedblom has not moved abroad, and lives in his hometown Gävle in Sweden, close to his relatives. He is a long-time fan of the local ice hockey team, Brynäs IF, who was dominating in Sweden in the 1970s.

In 2001, Hedblom broke his leg. This mishap came about when he participated in a yearly ice hockey game for golfers.

His son Kasper, born 1994, works as an instructing golf professional at Gävle Golf Club.

When his sister Marlene won the Biarritz Ladies Classic on the Ladies European Tour in 2003, the two of them became the only brother and sister siblings, who have won on the European Tour and Ladies European Tour respectively.

== Amateur wins ==
- 1987 Swedish Boys Championship
- 1988 Doral Junior Classic (USA), Nordic Amateur Championship

== Professional wins (9) ==
=== European Tour wins (3) ===
No.	Date	Tournament	Winning score	Margin of victory	Runner-up
1	10 Mar 1996	Moroccan Open	−7 (68-67-74-72=281)	1 stroke	(Argentina) Eduardo Romero
2	11 Feb 2007	Maybank Malaysian Open^{1}	−8 (73-71-68-68=280)	1 stroke	(France) Jean-François Lucquin
3	30 Aug 2009	Johnnie Walker Championship at Gleneagles	−13 (72-68-68-67=275)	1 stroke	(Sweden) Martin Erlandsson

^{1}Co-sanctioned by the Asian Tour

European Tour playoff record (0–4)

No.	Year	Tournament	Opponent(s)	Result
1	2003	Canarias Open de España	(England) Kenneth Ferrie, (Republic of Ireland) Peter Lawrie	Ferrie won with birdie on second extra hole
2	2003	Nissan Irish Open	(Denmark) Thomas Bjørn, (New Zealand) Michael Campbell	Campbell won with birdie on first extra hole
3	2008	Maybank Malaysian Open	(India) Arjun Atwal	Lost to par on second extra hole
4	2009	KLM Open	(England) Simon Dyson, (Republic of Ireland) Peter Lawrie	Dyson won with birdie on first extra hole

=== Challenge Tour wins (4) ===
No.	Date	Tournament	Winning score	Margin of victory	Runner(s)-up
1	27 May 1990	Jede Hot Cup Open	−4 (71-74-66=212)	1 stroke	(Sweden) Robert Karlsson
2	23 Jun 1991	Formula Micro Danish Open	−8 (71-65-67-73=276)	3 strokes	(Sweden) Per G. Nyman
3	15 Sep 1991	Upsala Golf International	−2 (69-71-71=211)	1 stroke	(Sweden) Fredrik Almskoug, (United States) Chris Cockson
4	15 Jul 2001	Volvo Finnish Open	−14 (66-69-69-70=274)	Playoff	(Denmark) Mads Vibe-Hastrup

Challenge Tour playoff record (1–0)

No.	Year	Tournament	Opponent	Result
1	2001	Volvo Finnish Open	(Denmark) Mads Vibe-Hastrup	Won with birdie on fourth extra hole

=== Other wins (2) ===
- 2003 Älvkarleby Open (Swedish mini-tour)
- 2014 SPM Open (Swedish mini-tour Future Series)

== Results in major championships ==
Tournament	1990	1991	1992	1993	1994	1995	1996	1997	1998	1999
U.S. Open										
The Open Championship	CUT	T96					T7	CUT	CUT	
PGA Championship										

Tournament	2000	2001	2002	2003	2004	2005	2006	2007	2008	2009
U.S. Open						T11	T21			
The Open Championship					CUT		CUT			CUT
PGA Championship									CUT	

Tournament	2010	2011	2012	2013
U.S. Open				T65
The Open Championship				
PGA Championship				

Note: Hedblom never played in the Masters Tournament.

Top 10
Did not play

CUT = missed the half-way cut
"T" = tied

== Results in World Golf Championships ==
Tournament	2009
Match Play	
Championship	
Invitational	
Champions	T70

Did not play

"T" = Tied

== Team appearances ==
Amateur

- European Boys' Team Championship (representing Sweden): 1986, 1987
- Jacques Léglise Trophy (representing the Continent Europe): 1986 (winners), 1987

Professional

- Dunhill Cup (representing Sweden): 1996

== See also ==
- List of golfers with most Challenge Tour wins
