= 1993 Challenge Tour =

Golf tour season

1993 Challenge Tour season
- Duration: 28 January 1993 – 16 October 1993
- Number of official events: 44
- Most wins: (Sweden) Klas Eriksson (3) (Sweden) Niclas Fasth (3)
- Rankings: (Sweden) Klas Eriksson

The 1993 Challenge Tour was the fifth season of the Challenge Tour, the official development tour to the European Tour.

== Schedule ==
The following table lists official events during the 1993 season.

Date	Tournament	Host country	Purse (£)	Winner (Note: The number in brackets after each winner's name is the number of Challenge Tour events they had won up to and including that tournament. This information is only shown for Challenge Tour members. It is rare for someone to accumulate many wins on the Challenge Tour as success at this level usually leads to promotion to the European Tour.)	Notes
31 Jan	Zambia Open	Zambia	75,000	(England) Peter Harrison (1)	
7 Feb	Kenya Open	Kenya	95,000	(Scotland) Craig Maltman (1)	
14 Feb	Nigerian Open	Nigeria	125,000	(Scotland) Gordon Manson (1)	
3 Apr	Tessali Open	Italy	Lit 120,000,000	(Sweden) Olle Nordberg (2)	
4 Apr	Campeonato de Castilla	Spain	Pta 6,000,000	(Sweden) Daniel Westermark (1)	New tournament
10 Apr	Open Jezequel	France	60,000	(United States) Charles Raulerson (1)	New tournament
16 Apr	Collingtree Park Challenge	England	35,000	(Republic of Ireland) Kevin Morris (1)	New tournament
2 May	Torneo Istantilla Golf	Spain	Pta 5,000,000	(Sweden) Magnus Persson (2)	New tournament
9 May	Tournoi Perrier de Paris	France	130,000	(United States) Phil Mickelson (n/a)	New tournament
16 May	Open de Vittel	France	65,000	(France) Jean-Louis Guépy (1)	
29 May	Club Med Open	Italy	Lit 150,000,000	(Sweden) Klas Eriksson (1)	
30 May	Ramlösa Open	Sweden	SKr 400,000	(Sweden) Olle Karlsson (1)	
6 Jun	Challenge Chargeurs	France	55,000	(Sweden) Adam Mednick (2)	
6 Jun	SIAB Open	Sweden	SKr 350,000	(Sweden) Per-Ive Persson (1)	
11 Jun	Clydesdale Bank Northern Open	Scotland	27,500	(Scotland) Kevin Stables (1)	
13 Jun	Challenge AGF	France	55,000	(Spain) Ignacio Garrido (1)	
20 Jun	Milano Open	Italy	Lit 160,000,000	(Wales) Mark Litton (2)	
20 Jun	Team Erhverv Danish Open	Denmark	SKr 450,000	(Denmark) Christian Post (1)	
27 Jun	Audi Quattro Trophy	Germany	55,000	(England) Jonathan Lomas (2)	
28 Jun	Memorial Olivier Barras	Switzerland	CHF 50,000	(Spain) Francisco Valera (a) (1)	
4 Jul	Bank Austria Open	Austria	50,000	(Sweden) Klas Eriksson (2)	
11 Jul	Open de Neuchâtel	Switzerland	CHF 100,000	(Switzerland) Paolo Quirici (1)	
11 Jul	Volvo Finnish Open	Finland	SKr 300,000	(Sweden) Per Nyman (1)	
16 Jul	Pro-Am de Leman	Switzerland	CHF 100,000	(Spain) Diego Borrego (1)	
18 Jul	Open des Volcans	France	70,000	(Sweden) Dennis Edlund (1)	
25 Jul	Audi Open	Germany	65,000	(Germany) Alex Čejka (2)	
25 Jul	Interlaken Open	Switzerland	CHF 100,000	(England) Jamie Taylor (1)	New tournament
25 Jul	Västerås Open	Sweden	SKr 275,000	(Sweden) Niclas Fasth (1)	
1 Aug	Corfin Charity Challenge	Czech Republic	55,000	(England) Ian Spencer (2)	
1 Aug	Open Ribera de Duero	Spain	Pta 5,000,000	(Spain) José Salgado (1)	New tournament
7 Aug	Rolex Pro-Am	Switzerland	CHF 100,000	(England) Philip Golding (2)	
8 Aug	Toyota Danish PGA Championship	Denmark	SKr 275,000	(Sweden) Fredrik Andersson (1)	New tournament
15 Aug	Compaq Open	Sweden	SKr 550,000	(Sweden) Niclas Fasth (2)	
22 Aug	Open de Divonne	France	55,000	(Sweden) Fredrik Larsson (3)	New tournament
28 Aug	Gore-Tex Challenge	Scotland	35,000	(United States) Charles Raulerson (2)	
29 Aug	Finnish PGA Championship	Finland	3,000	(Sweden) Jarmo Sandelin (1)	New to Challenge Tour
29 Aug	SM Match Play	Sweden	SKr 300,000	(Norway) Per Haugsrud (1)	
5 Sep	Open de Dijon Bourgogne	France	45,000	(Sweden) Niclas Fasth (3)	
12 Sep	Championnat de France Pro	France	65,000	(France) Christian Cévaër (1)	New to Challenge Tour
19 Sep	Perrier European Pro-Am	Belgium	40,000	(England) Chris Platts (2)	
26 Sep	Challenge Novotel	France	55,000	(Sweden) Klas Eriksson (3)	
9 Oct	Biarritz International Pro-Am	France	30,000	(France) Tim Planchin (2)	New tournament
10 Oct	Torneo RCG de Sevilla	Spain	Pta 5,000,000	(Denmark) Jacob Rasmussen (1)	New tournament
16 Oct	Perugia Open	Italy	Lit 120,000,000	(England) Jonathan Lomas (3)	New tournament

=== Unofficial events ===
The following events were sanctioned by the Challenge Tour, but did not carry official money, nor were wins official.

Date	Tournament	Host country	Purse (£)	Winner	Notes
16 May	American Express Trophy	Germany	45,000	(Germany) Sven Strüver	
23 May	Scottish Professional Championship	Scotland	55,000	(Scotland) Sam Torrance	
26 Jun	Nedcar National Open	Netherlands	ƒ45,000	(England) John Woof	
29 Sep	Diners Club Championship	Austria	17,500	(Scotland) Gordon Manson	

== Rankings ==
The rankings were based on prize money won during the season, calculated in Pound sterling. The top 10 players on the rankings earned status to play on the 1994 European Tour (Volvo Tour).

Rank	Player	Prize money (£)
1	(Sweden) Klas Eriksson	48,365
2	(France) Jean-Louis Guépy	42,274
3	(England) Jonathan Lomas	40,976
4	(Scotland) Gordon Manson	38,777
5	(France) Frédéric Regard	36,435

== See also ==
- 1993 Swedish Golf Tour
