= Mats Hallberg =

Swedish professional golfer

Personal information
- Nationality: Sweden
- Born: 12 December 1964 (age 61) Nyköping, Sweden
- Height: 193 cm (6 ft 4 in)

Career
- Sport: Golf
- Turned professional: 1984
- Former tours: European Tour; Challenge Tour; Swedish Golf Tour
- Professional wins: 4

Number of wins by tour
- Challenge Tour: 3
- Other: 1

Best results in major championships
- Masters Tournament: DNP
- PGA Championship: DNP
- U.S. Open: DNP
- The Open Championship: T68: 1995

Achievements and awards
- Swedish Golf Tour Rookie of the Year winner: 1984
- Swedish Golf Tour Order of Merit winner: 1991, 1994

Mats Hallberg (born 12 December 1964) is a Swedish professional golfer and broadcaster who played on the European Tour between 1988 and 1999. He finished 3rd in the 1996 Scottish Open at Carnoustie, was in contention at the 1998 Volvo PGA Championship at Wentworth, and made the cut in the 1995 Open Championship at St Andrews.

== Early life and amateur career ==
Hallberg was born in Nyköping and was introduced to golf by his uncle at 14. His parents owned a farm and knowing how to operate a tractor, he started working at Ärila Golf Club after school. With free access to range balls, he developed his game quickly. He reached a scratch handicap by 1982. Hallberg served alongside Magnus Sunesson at the Kronoberg Regiment "golf platoon" in the winter of 1984/85.

== Professional career ==
Hallberg turned professional at 19 in 1984 and joined on the Swedish Golf Tour, where he was runner-up at the Swedish PGA Championship in his rookie season, and again in 1985, both times behind Per-Arne Brostedt. He played three seasons on the Challenge Tour, winning three tournaments across 1990 and 1991. In 1990 and 1994 he topped the Swedish Golf Tour Order of Merit. On the 1994 Challenge Tour he was runner up the Rolex Pro-Am, Ramlösa Open, Jämtland Open, and lost a playoff at Himmerland Open to finish 7th in the rankings and graduate to the European Tour.

In 1988 Hallberg joined the European Tour, where he played until 1999 and made over 225 starts. He recorded eight career top-10 finishes, including a solo third at the 1996 Scottish Open at Carnoustie Golf Links, won by Ian Woosnam. He tied for 3rd at the 1997 Volvo Scandinavian Masters at Barsebäck Golf & Country Club, won by Joakim Haeggman.

Hallberg played in four majors, where his biggest success came in the 1995 Open Championship at the Old Course at St Andrews. He shot a first round of 68 (−4), one stroke off the lead. John Daly eventually won at −6 after a playoff, and Hallberg finished tied for 68th along with Tiger Woods.

Hallberg was in contention at the 1998 Volvo PGA Championship, the European tour's flagship event, held at Wentworth Club. Finding himself a stroke behind the leader, compatriot Michael Jonzon, after two rounds and a stroke behind leader Colin Montgomerie after three rounds, he finished with a round of 70 versus the Scotsman's 69 to end the tournament two strokes behind the triumphing Montgomerie, tied 5th. The finish helped Hallberg reach a peak of 174th on the Official World Golf Ranking in 1998.

== Broadcast career ==
Hallberg made his TV debut in 1993 covering the British Open and Ryder Cup. After cutting back on his playing schedule in the early 2000s, he transitioned to broadcasting. He also served as coach for the Swedish National Team.

In joined Viasat Golf in 2002, and in 2016 moved to C More Entertainment to cover the PGA Tour along with Wilhelm Schauman. In 2021 he joined Discovery+ after they acquired the rights to air the PGA Tour.

== Professional wins (4) ==
=== Challenge Tour wins (3) ===
No.	Date	Tournament	Winning score	Margin of victory	Runner(s)-up
1	17 Jun 1990	Stiga Open	−10 (70-68-68=206)	1 stroke	(Sweden) Yngve Nilsson
2	2 Jun 1991	Jede Hot Cup Open	−3 (72-71-70=213)	2 strokes	(Sweden) Thomas Nilsson, (Sweden) Olle Karlsson, (Sweden) Jan Tilmanis, (Sweden) Fredrik C. Lundgren, (Argentina) Rubén Alvarez
3	16 Jun 1991	Stiga Open (2)	−7 (68-69-72=209)	2 strokes	(Sweden) Lars Bonnevier, (Sweden) Magnus Jönsson

Challenge Tour playoff record (0–1)

No.	Year	Tournament	Opponent	Result
1	1994	Himmerland Open	(England) Michael Archer	Lost to birdie on third extra hole

=== Other wins (1) ===
- 2009 Eskilstuna Open

== Results in major championships ==
Tournament	1993	1994	1995	1996	1997	1998
The Open Championship	CUT		T66	CUT		CUT

Did not play

CUT = missed the halfway cut
"T" = Tied
Note: Hallberg only played in The Open Championship.
