= Stiga Open =

Tournament information
- Location: Tranås, Sweden
- Established: 1988
- Course: Tranås Golf Club
- Par: 72
- Tours: Challenge Tour; Swedish Golf Tour
- Format: Stroke play
- Prize fund: kr 350,000
- Month played: June
- Final year: 1992

Tournament record score
- Aggregate: 273 Pierre Fulke (1992)
- To par: −15 as above

Final champion
- (Sweden) Pierre Fulke
- Location in Sweden

The Stiga Open was a golf tournament on the Challenge Tour from 1990 to 1992 and on the Swedish Golf Tour from 1988. It was always played in Tranås, Sweden.

== Winners ==
Year	Tour (Note: CHA − Challenge Tour; SWE − Swedish Golf Tour.)	Winner	Score	To par	Margin of victory	Runner(s)-up	Ref.
1992	CHA	(Sweden) Pierre Fulke	273	−15	1 stroke	(Sweden) Mats Hallberg	
1991	CHA	(Sweden) Mats Hallberg (2)	209	−7	2 strokes	(Sweden) Lars Bonnevier	
1990	CHA	(Sweden) Mats Hallberg	206	−10	1 stroke	(Sweden) Yngve Nilsson	
1989	CHA	(Sweden) Thomas Nilsson	205	−11	1 stroke	(Sweden) Magnus Sunesson	
1988	SWE	(Sweden) Clas Hultman	207	–9	3 strokes	(Sweden) Peter Carsbo (Sweden) Mikael Karlsson	
