= José Cantero =

Argentine professional golfer

Personal information
- Full name: José María Cantero
- Nationality: Argentina
- Born: 8 June 1959 (age 67)

Career
- Sport: Golf
- Turned professional: 1985
- Former tours: Challenge Tour; Tour de las Americas; European Tour
- Professional wins: 13

Number of wins by tour
- Challenge Tour: 3
- Other: 10

José María Cantero (born 8 June 1959) is an Argentine professional golfer who played on the Challenge Tour, the European Tour and the Tour de las Americas.

== Professional career ==
In 1985, Cantero turned professional. He played on the European Challenge Tour in 1990–1994 and he won three tournaments, all three of them taking place in Sweden, on this tour. In 1990, he finished 8th in the Challenge Tour Rankings.

In 1991, he placed 14th at the Lancia Martini Italian Open on the European Tour.

In 1994, he played three tournaments on United States second tier Nike Tour, later named the Korn Ferry Tour. His best finish was tied 12th at the 1994 NIKE Central Georgia Open.

Since the late 1990s, Cantero only played a few tournaments a year and only in South America. Since 2005, he has not been playing on any main golf tour.

== Professional wins (13) ==
=== Asia Golf Circuit wins (1) ===
| No. | Date | Tournament | Winning score | Margin of victory | Runner-up |
|---|---|---|---|---|---|
| 1 | 18 Mar 1995 | Sampoerna Indonesia Open | −11 (69-71-69-68=277) | 1 stroke | (Australia) Don Fardon |

=== Challenge Tour wins (3) ===
| No. | Date | Tournament | Winning score | Margin of victory | Runner-up |
|---|---|---|---|---|---|
| 1 | 12 Aug 1990 | Gevalia Open | −16 (70-65-70-67=272) | 1 stroke | (Sweden) Mats Lanner |
| 2 | 22 Sep 1991 | Viking Open | −9 (71-68-68=207) | 3 strokes | (Sweden) Magnus Jönsson |
| 3 | 23 Aug 1992 | SM Match Play | 2 up | | (Sweden) Kenny Cross |

Challenge Tour playoff record (0–1)

| No. | Year | Tournament | Opponents | Result |
|---|---|---|---|---|
| 1 | 1993 | Zambia Open | (England) Peter Harrison, (Sweden) Olle Nordberg, (France) Frédéric Regard | Harrison won with birdie on second extra hole |

=== Argentine Tour wins (7) ===
- 1987 Norpatagonico Open, Parana Open, Lobos City Tournament
- 1999 Jockey Club Rosario Open
- 2000 Jockey Club Rosario Open
- 2001 Norpatagonico Open
- 2002 La Rioja Open

=== Other wins (2) ===
- 1994 Prince of Wales Open (Chile)
- 1998 Nigerian Open
