= Peter Malmgren =

Swedish professional golfer

Personal information
- Full name: Peter Malmgren
- Nickname: Podda
- Nationality: Sweden
- Born: 21 January 1971 (age 55) Malmö, Sweden
- Height: 1.80 m (5 ft 11 in)
- Weight: 68 kg (150 lb; 10.7 st)

Career
- Sport: Golf
- Turned professional: 1995
- Former tours: Challenge Tour; Nordic Golf League; Swedish Golf Tour
- Professional wins: 4

Achievements and awards
- Nordic Golf League Order of Merit winner: 2004

Peter Malmgren (born 21 January 1971) is a Swedish professional golfer. He played mainly on the Challenge Tour and the Nordic Golf League, where he topped the 2004 Order of Merit. As an amateur, he won the 1992 European Youths' Team Championship.

== Early life and amateur career ==
Malmgren was born in Malmö and grew up in nearby Falsterbo in Vellinge Municipality.

Malmgren joined the National Team, and in 1992 he won the European Youths' Team Championship in Helsinki, Finland. His team, made up of Niclas Fasth, Max Anglert and Fredrik Andersson, Mikael Lundberg and Rikard Strångert, beat the England team 4.5–2.5 in the final.

== Professional career ==
Malmgren turned professional in 1995 and joined the Swedish Golf Tour, and from 1999 the Nordic Golf League, where he won events in Sweden, Latvia, Denmark and Norway.

At the 1999 DSV Hook Masters at Hook Golf Club, Malmgren shot a round of 62 (–11), the lowest-to-par round recorded in tournament play in Sweden at the time, only matched by Craig Stadler, Fredrik Orest and Fred Couples.

In 2004, he won the Hansabanka Baltic Open in Latvia and topped the Nordic Golf League ranking ahead of Magnus A. Carlsson.

Malmgren made around 80 starts on the Challenge Tour between 1995 and 2005, and recorded six top-10 finishes between 1998 and 2002. He finished tried 3rd at the 1999 Neuchâtel Open Golf Trophy and tied 3rd at the 2002 Credit Suisse Private Banking Open, a tournament abandoned due to severe weather. His best result on the Challenge Tour was runner-up in the 2001 Nykredit Danish Open, two strokes behind Sébastien Delagrange of France.

Malmgren was the victim of an unprovoked assault in Malmö in 2006 and spent nine days in intensive care. This effectively ended his European career, although he managed to recover and won the 2012 Danish PGA Championship.

== Professional wins (4) ==
=== Nordic Golf League wins (4) ===
No.	Date	Tournament	Winning score	Margin of victory	Runner(s)-up
1	22 May 1999	Möre Hotell Open	−7 (78-64-67=209)	3 strokes	(Sweden) Björn Pettersson
2	1 Aug 2004	Hansabanka Baltic Open	−12 (70-64-70=204)	Playoff	(Finland) Panu Kylliäinen
3	4 May 2006	Brundtland Open	−3 (72-70-71=213)	1 stroke	(Norway) Thomas Nielsen
4	21 Sep 2012	Freja PGA Championship	−11 (67-68-70=205)	Playoff	(Sweden) Jens Dantorp, (Denmark) Rasmus Hjelm Nielsen

== Team appearances ==
Amateur

- European Youths' Team Championship (representing Sweden): 1992 (winners)
