= Rikard Strångert =

Swedish professional golfer

Personal information
- Nationality: Sweden
- Born: 23 April 1972 (age 54) Linköping, Sweden
- Height: 1.80 m (5 ft 11 in)

Career
- Sport: Golf
- Turned professional: 1992
- Former tours: Asian Golf Circuit; Challenge Tour

Rikard Strångert (born 23 April 1972) is a Swedish professional golfer, who was one of Sweden 's leading amateur golfers in the early 1990s. He was part of the team winning the 1992 European Youths' Team Championship and member of the Swedish team, finishing fifth, at the 1992 Eisenhower Trophy. As a professional he was runner-up at the 1993 Toyota PGA Championship on the Challenge Tour.

== Early life and amateur career ==
In 1989, Strångert won the Swedish Teen Tour (up to 18) Order of Merit, despite losing in the final of the Swedish Boys 18 Match-play Championship.

18 years old, Strångert won the club championship at his home club, Linköping Golf Club, one of the leading elite clubs at the time in Sweden. The same year he won on the Swedish Teen Tour at Onsjö GC, medal play as well as match-play, beating the likes of future European Tour winners Niclas Fasth, Fredrik Andersson and Mikael Lundberg.

During Strångerts career, there were no national amateur tournaments to win in his country, due to Sweden's "open golf" policy, with the effect of all competitions open to professionals. However, Stångert was a leading amateur golfer in Sweden in the late 1980s and early 1990s. He represented his country at boys, youth's and seniors levels. He won bronze at the 1989 European Boys' Team Championship, held on home turf, together with Max Anglert, Klas Eriksson, Pierre Fulke, Gabriel Hjertstedt and Mikael Persson. They beat Italy 4.5–2.5 in the third place match, after falling to England 5–2 in the semi-final. In 1990, his Swedish team finished 5th in Reykjavík, Iceland.

He also played in the 1991 European Amateur Team Championship held in Madrid, Spain. In the team event at the 1991 Italian Amateur Championship, Strångert finished second behind Spain together with Joakim Rask.

In 1992, he won the European Youths' Team Championship in Helsinki, Finland. His team, made up of Niclas Fasth, Max Anglert, Fredrik Andersson, Mikael Lundberg and Peter Malmgren, beat the England team 4.5–2.5 in the final.

He represented Sweden at the 1992 Eisenhower Trophy in Vancouver, Canada together with Niclas Fasth, Max Anglert and Fredrik Andersson. The Swedish team finished 5th, unable to catch Australia and France in shared 3rd place. Strånger finished tied 38th individually, counting three of his four rounds towards the team total.

== Professional career ==
Stångert turned professional immediately following the Eisenhower Trophy in late 1992, as well as his teammates Niclas Fasth and Fredrik Andersson.

Between 1993 and 1996 he played a mixed schedule, typically on the Asian Golf Circuit during winter and the Challenge Tour during summer. His best result was a solo 2nd at the 1993 Toyota PGA Championship in Denmark, two strokes behind his compatriot Fredrik Andersson.

After retirement from tour he became a PGA teaching pro based in Costa del Sol, Spain, spelling his name Rikard Strongert. From 2019 he held the position as head professional at Los Arqueros Golf & Country Club, Benahivas, the first course designed by Seve Ballesteros.

== Team appearances ==
Amateur

- European Boys' Team Championship (representing Sweden): 1989, 1990
- European Youths' Team Championship (representing Sweden): 1992 (winners)
- European Amateur Team Championship (representing Sweden): 1991
- Eisenhower Trophy (representing Sweden): 1992
