= 2006 Swedish Golf Tour =

Golf tour season

2006 Swedish Golf Tour season
- Duration: 12 May 2006 – 6 October 2006
- Number of official events: 17
- Order of Merit: (Sweden) Fredrik Hammarberg

The 2006 Swedish Golf Tour, titled as the 2006 Telia Tour for sponsorship reasons, was the 23rd season of the Swedish Golf Tour, the main professional golf tour in Sweden since it was formed in 1984, with most tournaments being incorporated into the Nordic Golf League since 1999.

== Schedule ==
The following table lists official events during the 2006 season.

Date	Tournament	Location	Purse (SKr)	Winner (Note: The number in brackets after each winner's name is the number of Swedish Golf Tour events they had won up to and including that tournament. As most Swedish Golf Tour events are incorporated into the Nordic Golf League or Challenge Tour schedules, details of these wins are displayed there instead.)	Main tour (Note: CHA − Challenge Tour; NGL − Nordic Golf League.)
14 May	St Ibb Open	Skåne	250,000	(Sweden) Per Barth	NGL
19 May	Gambro Open	Skåne	200,000	(Sweden) Johan Carlsson	NGL
26 May	Kinnaborg Open	Västergötland	200,000	(Sweden) Andreas Andersson	NGL
2 Jun	Booz Allen Nordic Classic	Södermanland	100,000	(Sweden) Johan Bjerhag (2)	
11 Jun	Telia Masters	Skåne	500,000	(Sweden) Tony Edlund	NGL
18 Jun	Husqvarna Open	Småland	350,000	(Sweden) Fredrik Orest	NGL
9 Jul	Skåne Open	Skåne	200,000	(Sweden) Björn Pettersson	NGL
15 Jul	Salem Open	Södermanland	200,000	(Sweden) Åke Nilsson	NGL
30 Jul	Hansabanka Baltic Open	Latvia	425,000	(Sweden) Daniel Lindgren	NGL
12 Aug	Västerås Open	Västmanland	250,000	(Sweden) Robert Wahlin	NGL
19 Aug	PGA Landmann Open	Halland	300,000	(Sweden) Rikard Karlberg	NGL
25 Aug	SM Match	Gotland	200,000	(Sweden) Andreas Ljunggren	NGL
3 Sep	Telia Challenge Waxholm	Uppland	1,130,000	(Argentina) Rafael Echenique	CHA
9 Sep	Thermia Open	Småland	200,000	(Sweden) Joakim Rask	NGL
22 Sep	Swedish International	Södermanland	225,000	(Sweden) Andreas Ljunggren	NGL
1 Oct	TourGolf Open	Skåne	600,000	(Sweden) Pelle Edberg	NGL
6 Oct	Telia Tour Final	Västergötland	300,000	(Sweden) Pontus Leijon (1)	

== Order of Merit ==
The Order of Merit was based on tournament results during the season, calculated using a points-based system.

Position	Player	Points
1	(Sweden) Fredrik Hammarberg	1,491
2	(Sweden) Pelle Edberg	1,473
3	(Sweden) Tony Edlund	1,430
4	(Sweden) Björn Pettersson	1,423
5	(Sweden) Per Barth	1,352

== See also ==
- 2006 Danish Golf Tour
- 2006 Finnish Tour
- 2006 Norwegian Golf Tour
- 2006 Swedish Golf Tour (women)
