= Mikko Korhonen =

Finnish professional golfer

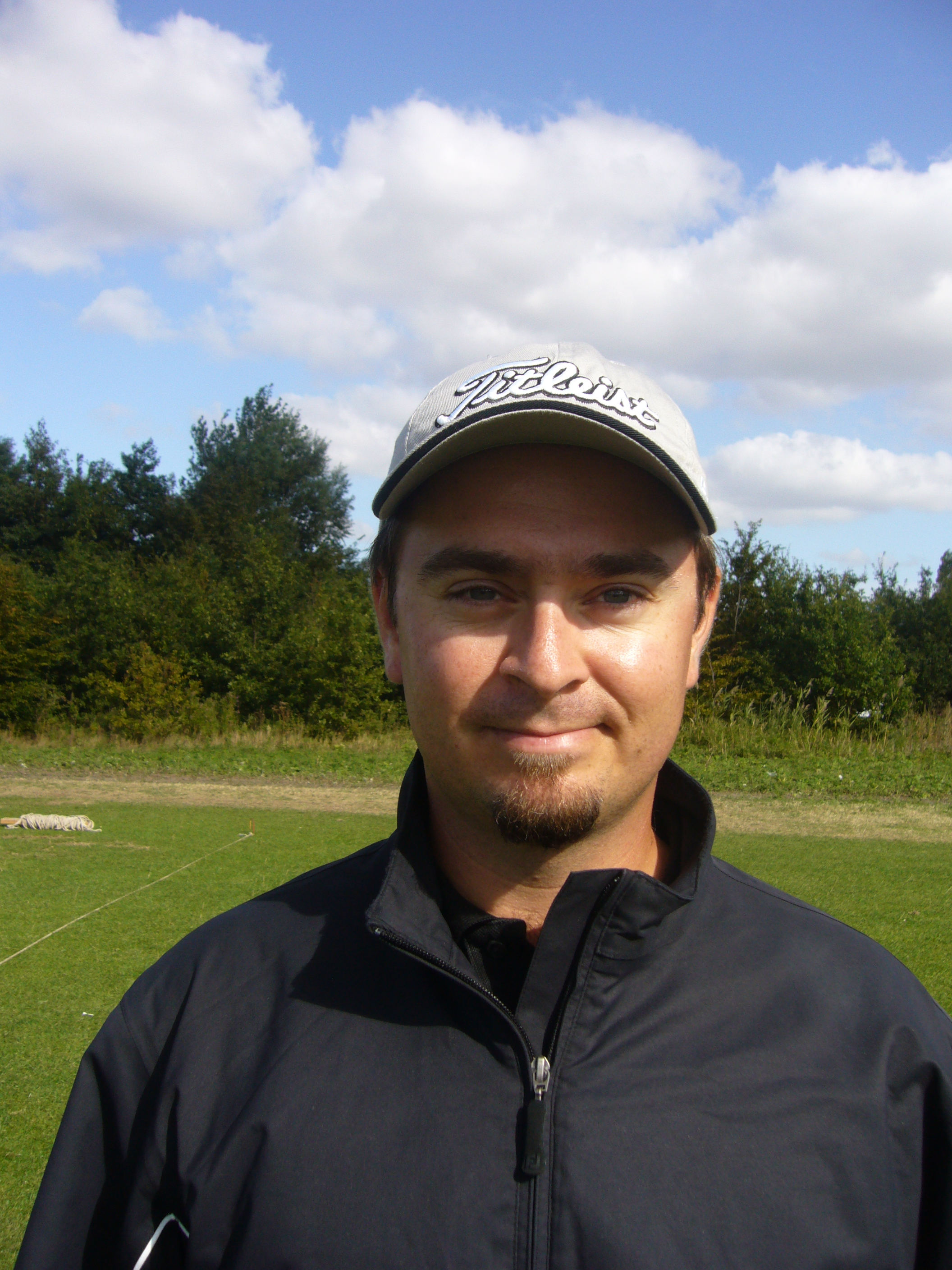
- Korhonen at the 2009 Dutch Futures

Personal information
- Nationality: Finland
- Born: 23 July 1980 (age 46) Mäntsälä, Finland
- Height: 1.74 m (5 ft 9 in)
- Weight: 77 kg (170 lb; 12.1 st)
- Spouse: Laura (m. 2007)
- Children: 4

Career
- Sport: Golf
- Turned professional: 2004
- Current tour: European Tour
- Former tour: Challenge Tour
- Professional wins: 2
- Highest ranking: 84 (5 May 2019)

Number of wins by tour
- European Tour: 2
- Asian Tour: 1

Best results in major championships
- Masters Tournament: DNP
- PGA Championship: CUT: 2018, 2019
- U.S. Open: DNP
- The Open Championship: T63: 2019

Mikko Korhonen (born 23 July 1980) is a Finnish professional golfer who currently plays on the European Tour. He won the 2018 Shot Clock Masters and the 2019 Volvo China Open.

== Professional career ==
Korhonen turned professional at the late age of 24, and spent the initial part of his career on the third-tier Nordic League tour. In 2006 he stepped up to the Challenge Tour, where he enjoyed five productive seasons, never winning but never finishing worse than 73rd in the final standings.

At the end of 2010, Korhonen progressed to the European Tour for the first time via qualifying school, but failed to retain his card for 2011. Korhonen returned to the Challenge Tour in 2012. In late 2012 he had his best result in a Challenge Tour event, finishing tied for third place in the Crowne Plaza Copenhagen Challenge and also progressed to the 2013 European Tour through qualifying school.

Since 2013 Korhonen has played on the European Tour, although he struggled in the 2013 and 2014 seasons and only retained his place on the tour through the qualifying school. In October 2016, he finished tied for third in the Portugal Masters, while in 2017 he was twice runner-up, in March in the Tshwane Open and in the Lyoness Open in June.

In 2018, Korhonen had more success in the Tshwane Open, finishing in third place. He achieved his first win on the European Tour in June 2018 at the Shot Clock Masters, winning by six strokes from Connor Syme. Korhonen was making his 146th European Tour and made 12 attempts at qualifying school before 2014.

Korhonen won the 2019 Volvo China Open after a playoff for his second European Tour success. He made a birdie-3 at the first extra hole to defeat Benjamin Hébert after the pair had tied at 20-under-par.

== Professional wins (2) ==
=== European Tour wins (2) ===
No.	Date	Tournament	Winning score	Margin of victory	Runner-up
1	10 Jun 2018	Shot Clock Masters	−16 (68-67-68-69=272)	6 strokes	(Scotland) Connor Syme
2	5 May 2019	Volvo China Open^{1}	−20 (68-69-65-66=268)	Playoff	(France) Benjamin Hébert

^{1}Co-sanctioned by the Asian Tour

European Tour playoff record (1–0)

No.	Year	Tournament	Opponent	Result
1	2019	Volvo China Open	(France) Benjamin Hébert	Won with birdie on first extra hole

== Results in major championships ==
Results not in chronological order before 2019.

Tournament	2018	2019
Masters Tournament		
PGA Championship	CUT	CUT
U.S. Open		
The Open Championship		T63

Did not play

CUT = missed the half-way cut
"T" = tied for place

== Team appearances ==
Amateur

- European Boys' Team Championship (representing Finland): 1998
- Jacques Léglise Trophy (representing the Continent of Europe): 1998
- European Youths' Team Championship (representing Finland): 2000
- Eisenhower Trophy (representing Finland): 2004

Professional

- World Cup (representing Finland): 2008, 2013, 2018

== See also ==
- 2010 European Tour Qualifying School graduates
- 2012 European Tour Qualifying School graduates
- 2013 European Tour Qualifying School graduates
- 2014 European Tour Qualifying School graduates
