= 2012 Nordic Golf League =

Golf tour season

2012 Nordic Golf League season
- Duration: 16 March 2012 – 6 October 2012
- Number of official events: 25
- Most wins: (Denmark) Lucas Bjerregaard (2) (Sweden) Kristoffer Broberg (2) (Sweden) Jens Dantorp (2) (Sweden) David Palm (2)
- Order of Merit: (Denmark) Lucas Bjerregaard

The 2012 Nordic Golf League was the 14th season of the Nordic Golf League, a third-tier tour recognised by the European Tour.

== Schedule ==
The following table lists official events during the 2012 season.

Date	Tournament	Host country	Purse	Winner (Note: The number in brackets after each winner's name is the number of Nordic Golf League events they had won up to and including that tournament. It is rare for someone to accumulate many wins on the Nordic Golf League as success at this level usually leads to promotion to the Challenge Tour.)
18 Mar	ECCO Spanish Open	Spain	€45,000	(Norway) Christian Aronsen (5)
23 Mar	Mediter Real Estate Masters	Spain	€45,000	(Sweden) Jens Fahrbring (1)
28 Apr	PEAB PGA Grand Opening	Sweden	SKr 500,000	(Sweden) Niklas Lemke (1)
4 May	Sydbank Masters	Denmark	DKr 300,000	(Denmark) Jeff Winther (1)
11 May	Club La Santa Championship	Denmark	DKr 300,000	(Denmark) John Davies (2)
17 May	Elisefarm Open	Sweden	SKr 400,000	(Sweden) Jens Dantorp (7)
26 May	Söderby Masters	Sweden	SKr 400,000	(Denmark) Lucas Bjerregaard (1)
2 Jun	Svedala Open	Sweden	SKr 450,000	(Sweden) Marcus Larsson (1)
8 Jun	Samsø Classic	Denmark	DKr 250,000	(Denmark) Steen Tinning (1)
17 Jun	Danjord Masters	Denmark	DKr 300,000	(Norway) Peter Kaensche (2)
21 Jun	Nordea Open	Norway	SKr 350,000	(Sweden) Kristoffer Broberg (2)
29 Jun	Bravo Tours Open	Denmark	DKr 300,000	(Sweden) David Palm (3)
6 Jul	Katrineholm Open	Sweden	SKr 300,000	(Sweden) Kristoffer Broberg (3)
14 Jul	TehoSport Finnish Open	Finland	€60,000	(Finland) Tapio Pulkkanen (a) (3)
29 Jul	Gant Open	Finland	€40,000	(Sweden) Niklas Bruzelius (5)
5 Aug	Mørk Masters	Norway	DKr 300,000	(Norway) Kenneth Svanum (1)
11 Aug	Isaberg Open	Sweden	SKr 400,000	(Denmark) Lucas Bjerregaard (2)
18 Aug	SM Match	Sweden	SKr 300,000	(Sweden) Jesper Billing (1)
26 Aug	Landskrona Masters	Sweden	SKr 400,000	(Sweden) Jacob Glennemo (1)
1 Sep	Meri Teijo Open	Finland	€25,000	(Finland) Miki Kuronen (a) (1)
7 Sep	Willis Masters	Denmark	DKr 300,000	(Sweden) Jonathan Ågren (1)
15 Sep	Solkusten Masters	Sweden	SKr 400,000	(Sweden) David Palm (4)
21 Sep	Freja PGA Championship	Denmark	DKr 300,000	(Sweden) Peter Malmgren (4)
30 Sep	Nordea Tour Championship	Sweden	SKr 450,000	(Sweden) Johan Carlsson (2)
6 Oct	Backtee Race To HimmerLand	Denmark	DKr 520,000	(Sweden) Jens Dantorp (8)

== Order of Merit ==
The Order of Merit was based on tournament results during the season, calculated using a points-based system. The top five players on the Order of Merit (not otherwise exempt) earned status to play on the 2013 Challenge Tour.

Position	Player	Points	Status earned
1	(Denmark) Lucas Bjerregaard	52,260	Promoted to Challenge Tour
2	(Sweden) Johan Carlsson	41,786	Promoted to Challenge Tour
3	(Sweden) Jens Fahrbring	35,275	Promoted to Challenge Tour
4	(Sweden) Pontus Leijon	29,205	Promoted to Challenge Tour
5	(Sweden) Jacob Glennemo	29,141	Qualified for Challenge Tour (made cut in Q School)
6	(Sweden) David Palm	23,492	Promoted to Challenge Tour
7	(Sweden) Niclas Johansson	23,434	
8	(Denmark) Jeff Winther	22,553	
9	(Sweden) Gustav Adell	22,504	
10	(Sweden) Victor Hielte	19,229	

== See also ==
- 2012 Danish Golf Tour
- 2012 Finnish Tour
- 2012 Swedish Golf Tour
