= Massimo Scarpa =

Italian professional golfer

Personal information
- Full name: Massimo Scarpa
- Nationality: Italy
- Born: 5 June 1970 (age 56) Venice, Italy
- Height: 1.73 m (5 ft 8 in)
- Weight: 65 kg (143 lb; 10.2 st)

Career
- Sport: Golf
- Turned professional: 1992
- Former tour: European Tour
- Professional wins: 6

Number of wins by tour
- European Tour: 1
- Challenge Tour: 3

Massimo Scarpa (born 5 June 1970) is an Italian professional golfer.

== Golf career ==
Scarpa was born in Venice and turned professional at the end of 1992 having won the European Amateur. He played on the European Tour and the second tier Challenge Tour between 1993 and 2006. He won once on the European Tour and twice on the Challenge Tour. He also won the Italian National Omnium three times in four years between 1998 and 2001. He played on the Italian team in the 1999 Alfred Dunhill Cup at St Andrews, beating three-time major champion Payne Stewart in the second round less than a month before Stewart's death.

He is notable for playing golf both left- and right-handed.

== Amateur wins ==
- 1992 European Amateur

== Professional wins (6) ==
=== European Tour wins (1) ===
No.	Date	Tournament	Winning score	Margin of victory	Runner-up
1	20 Aug 2000	Buzzgolf.com North West of Ireland Open^{1}	−13 (67-70-68-70=275)	1 stroke	(Sweden) Mikael Lundberg

^{1}Dual-ranking event with the Challenge Tour

=== Challenge Tour wins (3) ===
No.	Date	Tournament	Winning score	Margin of victory	Runner(s)-up
1	25 Apr 1998	Rimini International Open	−10 (69-73-68-68=278)	2 strokes	(England) John Bickerton, (England) Gordon J. Brand, (England) Roger Winchester
2	9 Aug 1998	Finnish Masters	−17 (69-70-63-69=271)	1 stroke	(Sweden) Chris Hanell
3	20 Aug 2000	Buzzgolf.com North West of Ireland Open^{1}	−13 (67-70-68-70=275)	1 stroke	(Sweden) Mikael Lundberg

^{1}Dual-ranking event with the European Tour

=== Other wins (3) ===
- 1998 Italian National Omnium
- 1999 Italian National Omnium
- 2001 Italian National Omnium

== Team appearances ==
Amateur

- European Youths' Team Championship (representing Italy): 1990 (winners)
- Eisenhower Trophy (representing Italy): 1990, 1992
- European Amateur Team Championship (representing Italy): 1991
- St Andrews Trophy (representing the Continent of Europe): 1992

Professional

- Alfred Dunhill Cup (representing Italy): 1999
