= 1999 Swedish Golf Tour =

Golf tour season

1999 Swedish Golf Tour season
- Duration: 9 May 1999 – 3 October 1999
- Number of official events: 15
- Order of Merit: (Sweden) Björn Pettersson

The 1999 Swedish Golf Tour, titled as the 1999 Telia Tour for sponsorship reasons, was the 16th season of the Swedish Golf Tour, the main professional golf tour in Sweden since it was formed in 1984, with most tournaments being incorporated into the Nordic Golf League since 1999.

== Schedule ==
The following table lists official events during the 1999 season.

Date	Tournament	Location	Purse (SKr)	Winner (Note: The number in brackets after each winner's name is the number of Swedish Golf Tour events they had won up to and including that tournament. As most Swedish Golf Tour events are incorporated into the Nordic Golf League or Challenge Tour schedules, details of these wins are displayed there instead.)	Main tour (Note: CHA − Challenge Tour; NGL − Nordic Golf League.)
10 May	Gula Sidorna Grand Opening	Uppland	100,000	(Sweden) Peter Hanson (4)	
22 May	Möre Hotell Open	Småland	100,000	(Sweden) Peter Malmgren	NGL
30 May	Kinnaborg Open	Västergötland	150,000	(Sweden) Richard S. Johnson	NGL
13 Jun	NCC Open	Skåne	€63,000	(Sweden) Per G. Nyman	CHA
20 Jun	Husqvarna Open	Småland	210,000	(Sweden) Björn Pettersson	NGL
11 Jul	Hofors Open	Gästrikland	125,000	(Sweden) Markus Westerberg	NGL
24 Jul	DSV Hook Masters	Småland	250,000	(Sweden) Patrik Gottfridsson	NGL
1 Aug	Isaberg Rapid Open	Småland	100,000	(Sweden) Johan Annerfelt	NGL
12 Aug	GE Capital Bank Open	Skåne	200,000	(Sweden) Peter Gustafsson	NGL
22 Aug	Västerås Open	Västmanland	150,000	(Sweden) Ville Lemon	NGL
29 Aug	Skandia PGA Open	Skåne	225,000	(Sweden) Per Larsson	NGL
5 Sep	Öhrlings Swedish Matchplay	Skåne	€63,000	(Sweden) Kalle Brink	CHA
19 Sep	DFDS Tor Line Open	Halland	400,000	(Sweden) Patrik Gottfridsson	NGL
26 Sep	Tomelilla Open	Skåne	125,000	(Sweden) Fredrik Widmark	NGL
3 Oct	Gula Sidorna Grand Prix	Skåne	€120,000	(Sweden) Raimo Sjöberg	CHA

== Order of Merit ==
The Order of Merit was based on tournament results during the season, calculated using a points-based system.

Position	Player	Points
1	(Sweden) Björn Pettersson	1,612
2	(Sweden) Peter Malmgren	1,431
3	(Sweden) Patrik Gottfridsson	1,404
4	(Sweden) Henrik Stenson	1,073
5	(Sweden) Per Larsson	1,061

== See also ==
- 1999 Swedish Golf Tour (women)
