= 1993 Swedish Golf Tour =

Golf tour season

1993 Swedish Golf Tour season
- Duration: 27 May 1993 – 19 September 1993
- Number of official events: 10
- Order of Merit: (Sweden) Niclas Fasth

The 1993 Swedish Golf Tour, titled as the 1993 Scandinavian Golf Tour, was the 10th season of the Swedish Golf Tour, the main professional golf tour in Sweden since it was formed in 1984, with most tournaments being incorporated into the Challenge Tour between 1989 and 1998.

== Schedule ==
The following table lists official events during the 1993 season.

Date	Tournament	Location	Purse (SKr)	Winner (Note: The number in brackets after each winner's name is the number of Swedish Golf Tour events they had won up to and including that tournament. As most Swedish Golf Tour events are incorporated into the Challenge Tour schedules, details of these wins are displayed there instead.)	Main tour (Note: CHA − Challenge Tour.)
30 May	Ramlösa Open	Västergötland	400,000	(Sweden) Olle Karlsson	CHA
6 Jun	SIAB Open	Skåne	350,000	(Sweden) Per-Ive Persson	CHA
20 Jun	Team Erhverv Danish Open	Denmark	450,000	(Denmark) Christian Post	CHA
4 Jul	Husqvarna Open	Småland	125,000	(Sweden) Lars Tingvall (1)	
11 Jul	Volvo Finnish Open	Finland	300,000	(Sweden) Per Nyman	CHA
25 Jul	Västerås Open	Västmanland	275,000	(Sweden) Niclas Fasth	CHA
8 Aug	Toyota Danish PGA Championship	Denmark	275,000	(Sweden) Fredrik Andersson	CHA
15 Aug	Compaq Open	Skåne	550,000	(Sweden) Niclas Fasth	CHA
29 Aug	SM Match Play	Uppland	300,000	(Norway) Per Haugsrud	CHA
19 Sep	Upsala Golf International	Uppland	200,000	(Sweden) Daniel Chopra (1)	

== Order of Merit ==
The Order of Merit was based on prize money won during the season, calculated in Swedish krona.

Position	Player	Prize money (SKr)
1	(Sweden) Niclas Fasth	184,365
2	(Sweden) Per Nyman	117,674
3	(Sweden) Fredrik Andersson	111,397
4	(Sweden) Olle Karlsson	88,550
5	(Sweden) Per-Ive Persson	81,213

== See also ==
- 1993 Swedish Golf Tour (women)
