= 2012 Swedish Golf Tour =

Golf tour season

2012 Swedish Golf Tour season
- Duration: 26 April 2012 – 30 September 2012
- Number of official events: 13
- Order of Merit: (Sweden) Johan Carlsson

The 2012 Swedish Golf Tour, titled as the 2012 Nordea Tour for sponsorship reasons, was the 29th season of the Swedish Golf Tour, the main professional golf tour in Sweden since it was formed in 1984, with most tournaments being incorporated into the Nordic Golf League since 1999.

== Schedule ==
The following table lists official events during the 2012 season.

Date	Tournament	Location	Purse (SKr)	Winner (Note: The number in brackets after each winner's name is the number of Swedish Golf Tour events they had won up to and including that tournament. As most Swedish Golf Tour events are incorporated into the Nordic Golf League schedule, details of these wins are displayed there instead.)	Main tour (Note: NGL − Nordic Golf League.)
28 Apr	PEAB PGA Grand Opening	Skåne	500,000	(Sweden) Niklas Lemke	NGL
11 May	Club La Santa Championship	Denmark	DKr 300,000	(Denmark) John Davies	NGL
17 May	Elisefarm Open	Skåne	400,000	(Sweden) Jens Dantorp	NGL
26 May	Söderby Masters	Uppland	450,000	(Denmark) Lucas Bjerregaard	NGL
2 Jun	Svedala Open	Skåne	450,000	(Sweden) Marcus Larsson	NGL
21 Jun	Nordea Open	Norway	350,000	(Sweden) Kristoffer Broberg	NGL
6 Jul	Katrineholm Open	Södermanland	300,000	(Sweden) Kristoffer Broberg	NGL
29 Jul	Gant Open	Finland	€40,000	(Sweden) Niklas Bruzelius	NGL
11 Aug	Isaberg Open	Småland	400,000	(Denmark) Lucas Bjerregaard	NGL
18 Aug	SM Match	Uppland	300,000	(Sweden) Jesper Billing	NGL
26 Aug	Landskrona Masters	Skåne	400,000	(Sweden) Jacob Glennemo	NGL
15 Sep	Solkusten Masters	Öland	400,000	(Sweden) David Palm	NGL
30 Sep	Nordea Tour Championship	Halland	450,000	(Sweden) Johan Carlsson	NGL

== Order of Merit ==
The Order of Merit was titled as the Nordea Tour Ranking and was based on tournament results during the season, calculated using a points-based system.

Position	Player	Points
1	(Sweden) Johan Carlsson	251,361
2	(Sweden) Kristoffer Broberg	224,438
3	(Denmark) Lucas Bjerregaard	218,677
4	(Sweden) Jacob Glennemo	168,975
5	(Sweden) Gustav Adell	167,648

== See also ==
- 2012 Danish Golf Tour
- 2012 Finnish Tour
- 2012 Swedish Golf Tour (women)
