= 2002 Swedish Golf Tour =

Golf tour season

2002 Swedish Golf Tour season
- Duration: 14 May 2002 – 22 September 2002
- Number of official events: 14
- Order of Merit: (Sweden) Joakim Kristiansson

The 2002 Swedish Golf Tour, titled as the 2002 Telia Tour for sponsorship reasons, was the 19th season of the Swedish Golf Tour, the main professional golf tour in Sweden since it was formed in 1984, with most tournaments being incorporated into the Nordic Golf League since 1999.

== Schedule ==
The following table lists official events during the 2002 season.

Date	Tournament	Location	Purse (SKr)	Winner (Note: The number in brackets after each winner's name is the number of Swedish Golf Tour events they had won up to and including that tournament. As most Swedish Golf Tour events are incorporated into the Nordic Golf League or Challenge Tour schedules, details of these wins are displayed there instead.)	Main tour (Note: CHA − Challenge Tour; NGL − Nordic Golf League.)
15 May	Telia Grand Opening	Västergötland	100,000	(Sweden) Johan Edfors	NGL
26 May	Kinnaborg Open	Västergötland	175,000	(Sweden) Joakim Kristiansson	NGL
1 Jun	St Ibb Open	Skåne	230,000	(Sweden) Fredrik Orest	NGL
16 Jun	Husqvarna Open	Småland	300,000	(Sweden) Hans Edberg	NGL
30 Jun	SM Match	Uppland	300,000	(Sweden) Fredrik Orest	NGL
14 Jul	Sundbyholm Open	Södermanland	250,000	(Sweden) Max Anglert	NGL
26 Jul	Gibson Scandinavia Brollsta Open	Uppland	175,000	(Sweden) Marcus Norgren	NGL
8 Aug	TietoEnator Open	Värmland	175,000	(Sweden) Joakim Kristiansson	NGL
17 Aug	Gula Sidorna Open	Uppland	250,000	(Sweden) Hampus von Post	NGL
25 Aug	Skandia PGA Open	Halland	€95,000	(France) Thomas Bescancenez	CHA
30 Aug	match.golf.se	Småland	200,000	(Sweden) Joakim Kristiansson	NGL
7 Sep	Västerås Open	Västmanland	250,000	(Sweden) Jonas Wåhlstedt	NGL
15 Sep	Telia Grand Prix	Skåne	1,100,000	(England) Matthew Blackey	CHA
22 Sep	St Arild Open	Skåne	175,000	(Sweden) Martin Erlandsson	NGL

== Order of Merit ==
The Order of Merit was based on tournament results during the season, calculated using a points-based system.

Position	Player	Points
1	(Sweden) Joakim Kristiansson	1,759
2	(Sweden) Fredrik Orest	1,653
3	(Sweden) Markus Westerberg	1,095
4	(Sweden) Peter Gustafsson	983
5	(Sweden) Jonas Wåhlstedt	933

== See also ==
- 2002 Finnish Tour
- 2002 Swedish Golf Tour (women)
