= Christian Cévaër =

French golfer (born 1970)

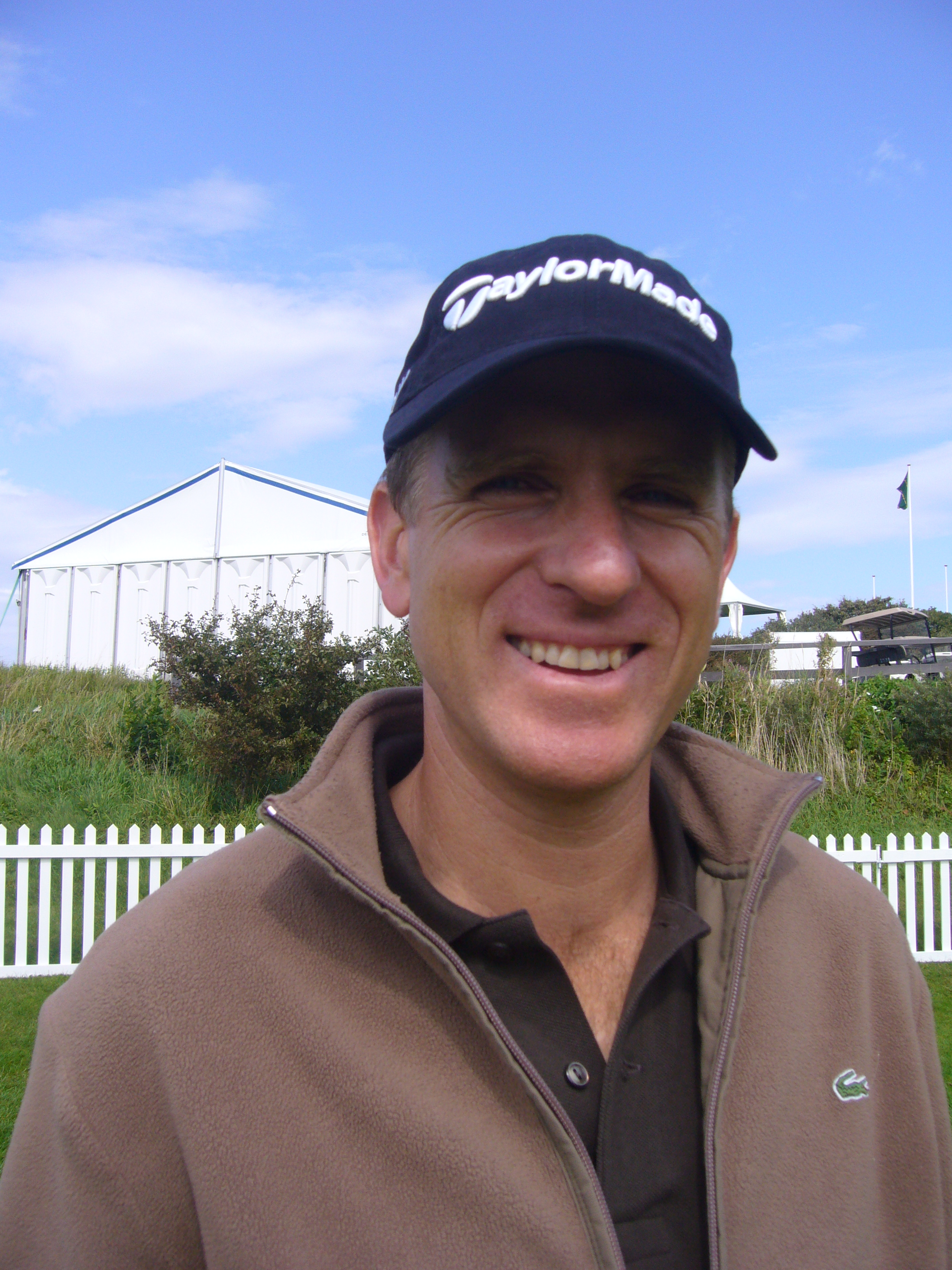

Personal information
- Full name: Christian Georges Cévaër
- Nationality: France
- Born: 10 April 1970 (age 56) Nouméa, New Caledonia
- Height: 1.81 m (5 ft 11 in)
- Spouse: Fabienne (m. 1999)
- Children: 2

Career
- Sport: Golf
- College: Stanford University
- Turned professional: 1993
- Current tour: European Senior Tour
- Former tour: European Tour
- Professional wins: 7

Number of wins by tour
- European Tour: 2
- Challenge Tour: 3
- Other: 2

Best results in major championships
- Masters Tournament: DNP
- PGA Championship: DNP
- U.S. Open: CUT: 2007
- The Open Championship: T71: 2004
Medal record
Mediterranean Games
Silver medal – second place	1991 Athens	Men's team
Gold medal – first place	1993 Languedoc-Roussillon	Men's individual
Gold medal – first place	1993 Languedoc-Roussillon	Men's team

Christian Georges Cévaër (born 10 April 1970) is a French professional golfer.

== Amateur career ==
Cévaër was born in Nouméa, New Caledonia. He attended the Stevenson School in Pebble Beach, California. He then earned a golf scholarship to Stanford University. He won the Pac-10 Championship twice. He also won the 1989 French Amateur Championship.

== Professional career ==
Cévaër turned professional in 1993. He has spent most of his professional career playing on the European Tour. Inconsistent form has necessitated several trips to the European Tour Qualifying School. Due to his inconsistent play he has also been forced to play on the developmental Challenge Tour. He has two European Tour titles, the 2004 Canarias Open de España and the European Open in 2009. In addition, he has two Challenge Tour victories, the 1998 Volvo Finnish Open and the 2000 Finnish Masters.

His best year-end ranking on the Order of Merit has been 41st in 2004.

== Amateur wins ==
- 1987 Doug Sanders World Junior Championship
- 1988 British Youths Open Amateur Championship
- 1989 French Native Amateur Championship, PAC-10 Championship
- 1992 PAC-10 Championship

== Professional wins (7) ==
=== European Tour wins (2) ===
No.	Date	Tournament	Winning score	Margin of victory	Runners-up
1	25 Apr 2004	Canarias Open de España	−9 (66-67-69-69=271)	1 stroke	(Argentina) Ricardo González, (Sweden) Peter Hedblom, (Wales) David Park
2	31 May 2009	European Open	−7 (67-70-70-74=281)	1 stroke	(Scotland) Gary Orr, (Spain) Álvaro Quirós, (England) Steve Webster

=== Challenge Tour wins (3) ===
No.	Date	Tournament	Winning score	Margin of victory	Runner(s)-up
1	12 Sep 1993	Championnat de France Pro	−9 (69-65-72-73=279)	1 stroke	(France) Géry Watine
2	12 Jul 1998	Volvo Finnish Open	−8 (67-67-71-75=280)	1 stroke	(Sweden) Fredrik Larsson, (Sweden) Daniel Westermark
3	13 Aug 2000	Finnish Masters	−20 (71-69-64-64=268)	1 stroke	(Sweden) Pehr Magnebrant

=== Other wins (2) ===
- 1993 Mediterranean Games
- 2000 MGT de Barbaroux

== Results in major championships ==
Tournament	2004	2005	2006	2007
U.S. Open				CUT
The Open Championship	T71			

Note: Cévaër never played in the Masters Tournament or the PGA Championship.

Did not play

CUT = missed the half-way cut
"T" = tied

== Results in World Golf Championships ==
Tournament	2009
Match Play	
Championship	
Invitational	T51
Champions	T54

Did not play

"T" = Tied

== Team appearances ==
Amateur

- European Boys' Team Championship (representing France): 1988 (winners)
- Eisenhower Trophy (representing France): 1988, 1990, 1992
- European Amateur Team Championship (representing France): 1989, 1991, 1993

Professional

- World Cup (representing France): 2009
