= Gary Murphy =

Irish professional golfer (born 1971)

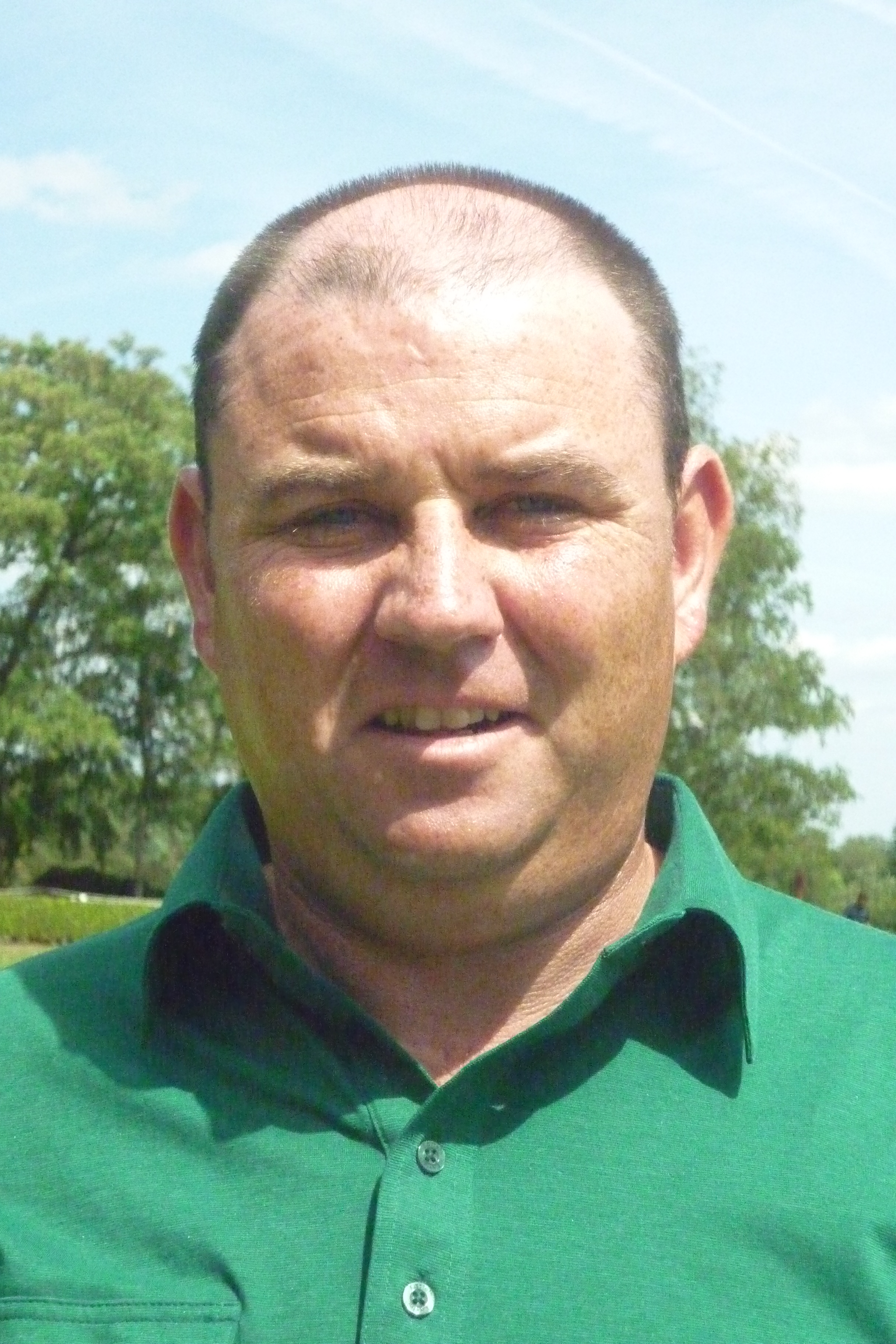

Personal information
- Full name: Gary Murphy
- Nationality: Ireland
- Born: 15 October 1972 (age 54) Kilkenny, County Kilkenny, Ireland
- Height: 1.83 m (6 ft 0 in)

Career
- Sport: Golf
- Turned professional: 1995
- Former tours: European Tour; Asian Tour
- Professional wins: 1

Best results in major championships
- Masters Tournament: DNP
- PGA Championship: DNP
- U.S. Open: DNP
- The Open Championship: T34: 2003

Gary Murphy (born 15 October 1972) is an Irish professional golfer.

== Career ==
Murphy was born in Kilkenny and began playing golf aged 11, after caddying for his father, Jim, who has played an instrumental role in the development of young golfers. He won the Irish Amateur Close Championship in 1992. He turned professional in 1995. He won the Asian Tour qualifying school in 1997, and played two seasons on that tour. In addition, he competed on the second tier European Challenge Tour, before returning to Europe full-time, after winning a European Tour card at the 1999 final qualifying school.

Murphy was unable to secure his place on the European Tour in his rookie season and dropped back down to the Challenge Tour in 2001 and 2002. He regained his European Tour card at the end of 2002 at final qualifying school. Since then, he has been able to win enough money each season to retain his playing status through his position on the Order of Merit.

== Amateur wins ==
- 1992 Irish Amateur Close Championship

== Professional wins (1) ==
- 2005 Azores Open

== Results in major championships ==
Tournament	1997	1998	1999	2000	2001	2002	2003
The Open Championship	CUT						T34

Note: Murphy only played in The Open Championship.

Did not play

CUT = missed the half-way cut
"T" = tied

== Team appearances ==
Amateur

- European Amateur Team Championship (representing Ireland): 1993, 1995

== See also ==
- 2009 European Tour Qualifying School graduates
