= Rimini International Open =

Tournament information
- Location: Rimini, Italy
- Established: 1998
- Course: Rimini Golf Club
- Par: 72
- Tour: Challenge Tour
- Format: Stroke play
- Prize fund: £65,000
- Month played: April
- Final year: 1998

Tournament record score
- Aggregate: 278 Massimo Scarpa
- To par: −10 as above

Final champion
- (Italy) Massimo Scarpa

Location map
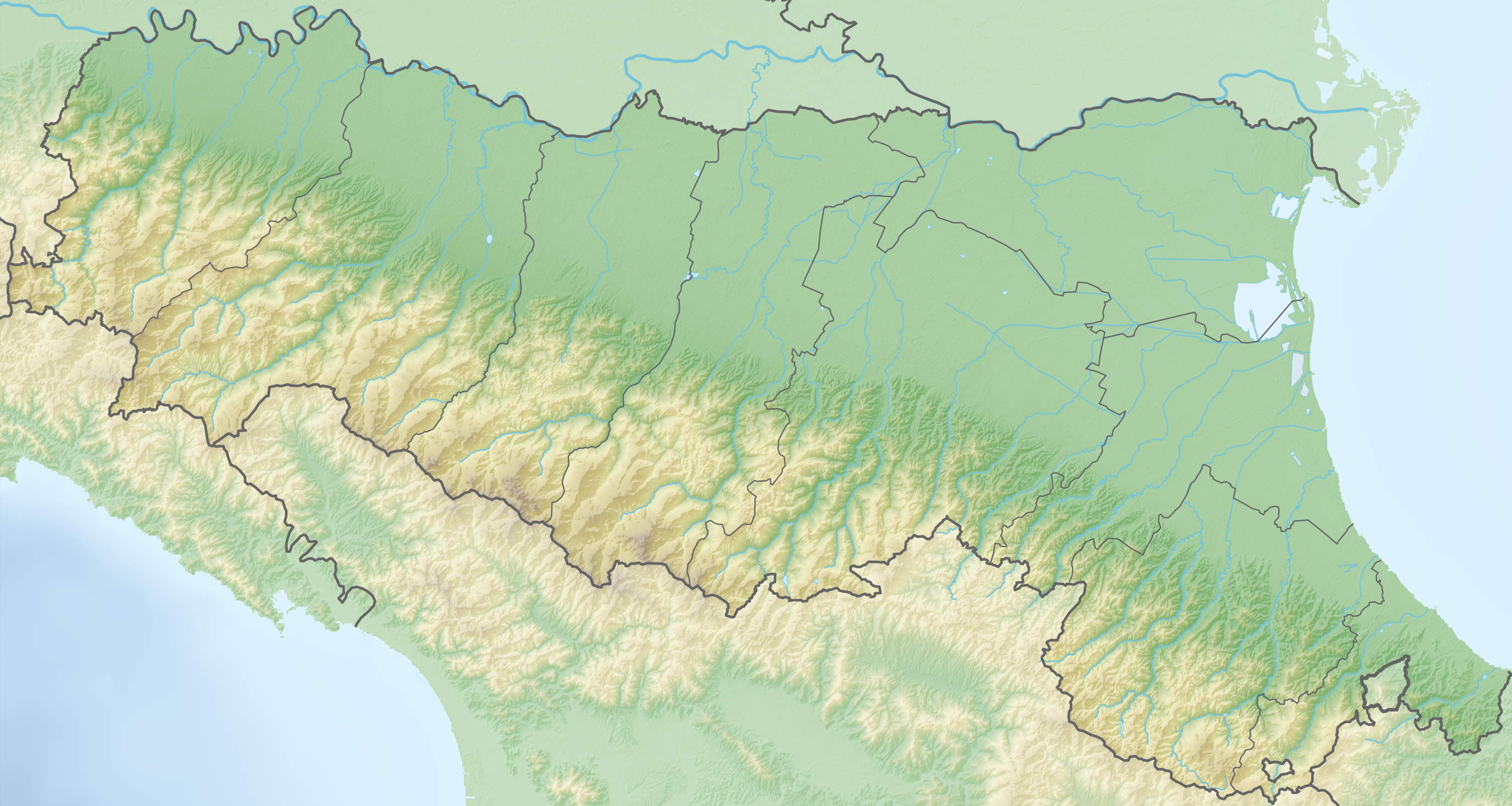
- Location in Italy Location in Emilia-Romagna

The Rimini International Open was a golf tournament on the Challenge Tour, played in Italy. It was a one-off held 1998 at Rimini Golf Club.

== Winners ==
Year	Winner	Score	To par	Margin of victory	Runners-up	Ref.
1998	(Italy) Massimo Scarpa	278	−10	2 strokes	(England) John Bickerton (England) Gordon J. Brand (England) Roger Winchester	
