= 2012 Swedish Golf Tour (women) =

27th season of the Swedish Golf Tour (women)

2012 Swedish Golf Tour season
- Duration: May 2012 – September 2012
- Number of official events: 10
- Most wins: 2 wins: (Sweden) Isabella Ramsay
- Order of Merit winner: (Norway) Cecilie Lundgreen

The 2012 Swedish Golf Tour, known as the Nordea Tour for sponsorship reasons, was the 27th season of the Swedish Golf Tour, a series of professional golf tournaments for women held in Sweden and Norway.

A number of the tournaments also featured on the 2012 LET Access Series (LETAS).

== Schedule ==
The season consisted of 10 tournaments played between May and September, where one event was held in Norway.

Date	Tournament	Venue	Winner	Runner(s)-up	Purse (SEK)	Tour	Ref
12 May	Kristianstad Åhus Ladies Open	Kristianstad	(Norway) Cecilie Lundgreen	(France) Marion Ricordeau	€30,000	LETAS	
18 May	Ljungbyhed Park PGA Ladies Open	Ljungbyhed	(Scotland) Pamela Pretswell	(Sweden) Isabella Deilert	€30,000	LETAS	
29 Jun	Frontwalker Ladies Open	Botkyrka	(Sweden) Isabella Ramsay	(Sweden) Christine Hallström (Sweden) Louise Kristersson (Sweden) Cajsa Persson	200,000		
6 Jul	Ladies Norwegian Challenge	Losby, Norway	(Norway) Marianne Skarpnord	(Sweden) Daniela Holmqvist	€25,000	LETAS	
12 Jul	Smådalarö Gård Open	Smådalarö Gård	(Sweden) Emelie Lind	(Sweden) Nathalie Månsson	300,000		
4 Aug	A6 Ladies Open	A6	(Sweden) Anna Dahlberg Söderström	(Norway) Cecilie Lundgreen	200,000		
18 Aug	SM Match	Österåker	(Sweden) Lina Boqvist	(Sweden) Julia Davidsson	200,000		
26 Aug	VW Söderbergs Ladies Masters	Bråviken	(Sweden) Josefine Sundh	(Sweden) Helena Callahan	200,000		
2 Sep	Norrporten Ladies Open	Sundsvall	(Sweden) Amanda Sträng	(Sweden) Anjelika Hammar (Sweden) Linda Henriksson (Australia) Corie Hou	200,000		
29 Sep	Nordea Tour Championship	Kungsbacka	(Sweden) Isabella Ramsay	(Sweden) Maria Ohlsson	300,000		

Swedish PGA Championship
Swedish Matchplay Championship

== See also ==
- 2012 Swedish Golf Tour (men's tour)
