= 2006 Nordic Golf League =

Golf tour season

2006 Nordic Golf League season
- Duration: 22 February 2006 – 14 October 2006
- Number of official events: 43
- Most wins: (Denmark) Morten Hedegaard (2) (Denmark) Christoffer Lange (2) (Sweden) Andreas Ljunggren (2) (Finland) Jaakko Mäkitalo (2) (Finland) Janne Martikainen (2)
- Order of Merit: (Sweden) Pontus Ericsson

The 2006 Nordic Golf League was the eighth season of the Nordic Golf League, a third-tier tour recognised by the European Tour.

== Schedule ==
The following table lists official events during the 2006 season.

Date	Tournament	Host country	Purse	Winner (Note: The number in brackets after each winner's name is the number of Nordic Golf League events they had won up to and including that tournament. It is rare for someone to accumulate many wins on the Nordic Golf League as success at this level usually leads to promotion to the Challenge Tour.)	Other tours (Note: CHA − Challenge Tour.)
24 Feb	Winter Series #1	Portugal	€15,000	(Finland) Jaakko Mäkitalo (3)	
3 Mar	Winter Series #2	Portugal	€15,000	(Sweden) Petter Bocian (1)	
10 Mar	Winter Series #3	Portugal	€15,000	(Sweden) Robert Johansén (1)	
27 Apr	IBM Open	Denmark	€15,000	(Denmark) John Davies (1)	
4 May	Brundtland Open	Denmark	DKr 225,000	(Sweden) Peter Malmgren (3)	
7 May	DnB NOR Open	Norway	€15,000	(Norway) Jan-Are Larsen (1)	
11 May	Eurocard Open	Denmark	€15,000	(Denmark) Christoffer Lange (1)	
14 May	St Ibb Open	Sweden	SKr 250,000	(Sweden) Per Barth (1)	
19 May	Gambro Open	Sweden	SKr 200,000	(Sweden) Johan Carlsson (a) (1)	
21 May	Fujitsu-Siemens Open	Norway	€15,000	(Norway) Martin Dahl (1)	
26 May	Kinnaborg Open	Sweden	SKr 200,000	(Sweden) Andreas Andersson (1)	
27 May	FGT Opening	Finland	€12,000	(Finland) Tuomas Tuovinen (1)	
1 Jun	Dangaard Telekom - Fleggard Leasing Open	Denmark	DKr 225,000	(Finland) Janne Martikainen (3)	
11 Jun	Sonera Open	Finland	€15,000	(Finland) Mika Lehtinen (2)	
11 Jun	Telia Masters	Sweden	SKr 500,000	(Sweden) Tony Edlund (2)	
18 Jun	Husqvarna Open	Sweden	SKr 350,000	(Sweden) Fredrik Orest (3)	
22 Jun	Herning Open	Denmark	€15,000	(Sweden) Fredrik Ohlsson (1)	
27 Jun	DG Event Open	Denmark	€25,000	(Denmark) Steen Ottosen (2)	
2 Jul	Danfoss Open	Denmark	€15,000	(Denmark) Peter Ankersø (1)	
6 Jul	Ladbrokes Golf Championship	Denmark	DKr 225,000	(Denmark) Peter Jespersen (1)	
9 Jul	Finnish Open	Finland	€15,000	(Finland) Jaakko Mäkitalo (4)	
9 Jul	Interspons Open	Norway	€15,000	(Norway) Eirik Tage Johansen (2)	
9 Jul	Skåne Open	Sweden	SKr 200,000	(Sweden) Björn Pettersson (4)	
15 Jul	Salem Open	Sweden	SKr 200,000	(Sweden) Åke Nilsson (3)	
25 Jul	Centrebet Open	Denmark	€15,000	(Denmark) Morten Hedegaard (1)	
30 Jul	Hansabanka Baltic Open	Latvia	SKr 425,000	(Sweden) Daniel Lindgren (1)	
9 Aug	Aller Masters	Denmark	DKr 225,000	(Sweden) Pontus Ericsson (1)	
12 Aug	Västerås Open	Sweden	SKr 250,000	(Sweden) Robert Wahlin (1)	
13 Aug	Willis Open	Denmark	€15,000	(Finland) Janne Martikainen (4)	
19 Aug	Bornholm Masters	Denmark	€25,000	(Sweden) Lars Edvinson (2)	
19 Aug	PGA Landmann Open	Sweden	SKr 300,000	(Sweden) Rikard Karlberg (1)	
20 Aug	Sony Ericsson Open	Norway	€15,000	(Norway) Christian Aronsen (1)	
25 Aug	SM Match	Sweden	SKr 200,000	(Sweden) Andreas Ljunggren (5)	
27 Aug	Hansabank Estonian Open	Estonia	€25,000	(Finland) Casimir Collin (1)	
27 Aug	ECCO Tour Championship	Denmark	€130,000	(England) James Heath (n/a)	CHA
3 Sep	Hydro-Texaco Open	Norway	€15,000	(Norway) Knut Børsheim (a) (1)	
9 Sep	Gant Open	Finland	€15,000	(Finland) Antti Ahokas (2)	
9 Sep	Thermia Open	Sweden	SKr 200,000	(Sweden) Joakim Rask (2)	
22 Sep	Swedish International	Sweden	SKr 225,000	(Sweden) Andreas Ljunggren (6)	
24 Sep	Ingram Micro Open	Denmark	€15,000	(Denmark) Christoffer Lange (2)	
1 Oct	TourGolf Masters	Sweden	SKr 600,000	(Sweden) Pelle Edberg (4)	
6 Oct	Smørum Open	Denmark	€15,000	(Denmark) Morten Hedegaard (2)	
14 Oct	Scanplan Tour Final	Denmark	€15,000	(Sweden) Per G. Nyman (2)	

== Order of Merit ==
The Order of Merit was based on tournament results during the season, calculated using a points-based system. The top five players on the Order of Merit earned status to play on the 2007 Challenge Tour.

Position	Player	Points	Status earned
1	(Sweden) Pontus Ericsson	2,207	Promoted to Challenge Tour
2	(Sweden) Per Barth	1,851	Promoted to Challenge Tour
3	(Sweden) Fredrik Ohlsson	1,846	Promoted to Challenge Tour
T4	(Denmark) Morten Hedegaard	1,711	Promoted to Challenge Tour
T4	(Denmark) Christoffer Lange	1,711	Promoted to Challenge Tour
6	(Sweden) Fredrik Hammarberg	1,682	
7	(Finland) Janne Martikainen	1,670	
8	(Sweden) Pelle Edberg	1,665	
9	(Sweden) Niklas Bruzelius	1,583	
10	(Sweden) Petter Bocian	1,569	

== See also ==
- 2006 Danish Golf Tour
- 2006 Finnish Tour
- 2006 Norwegian Golf Tour
- 2006 Swedish Golf Tour
