= 2009 European Tour Qualifying School graduates =

This is a list of the 31 players who earned their 2010 European Tour card through Q School in 2009.

Place	Player	European Tour starts	Cuts made	Notes
1	(England) Simon Khan	199	124	1 European Tour win
2	(England) Sam Hutsby	5	3	
3	(Scotland) Stephen Gallacher	305	186	1 European Tour win; held medical exemption for first 10 events in 2010
T4	(Paraguay) Marco Ruiz	47	18	1 Challenge Tour win
T4	(Spain) Alejandro Cañizares	71	44	1 European Tour win
6	(Sweden) Fredrik Ohlsson	0	0	
T7	(Norway) Eirik Tage Johansen	36	12	
T7	(Denmark) Mark Haastrup	5	2	1 Challenge Tour win
T7	(Scotland) Steven O'Hara	154	78	Played in 2001 Walker Cup
T7	(Argentina) Clodomiro Carranza	4	1	
11	(France) Benjamin Hébert	2	0	Won the 2007 European Amateur
T12	(Sweden) Fredrik Andersson Hed	235	122	2 Challenge Tour wins
T12	(England) Phillip Archer	186	109	1 Challenge Tour win
T12	(Spain) Carl Suneson	306	143	1 European Tour win
T12	(England) Jamie Elson	40	19	1 Challenge Tour win
T16	(South Africa) James Kamte	48	22	3 Sunshine Tour wins, 1 Asian Tour win
T16	(Republic of Ireland) Gary Murphy	248	138	
T16	(Scotland) Andrew Coltart	456	285	2 European Tour wins; played in 1999 Ryder Cup
T16	(Sweden) Steven Jeppesen	119	48	
T16	(South Africa) Anton Haig	95	35	1 European Tour win
T16	(South Africa) George Coetzee	6	4	3 Sunshine Tour wins
T16	(England) James Ruth	1	0	
T16	(Sweden) Patrik Sjöland	319	185	2 European Tour wins
T16	(Germany) Stephan Gross	3	1	
T16	(Sweden) Jarmo Sandelin	391	236	5 European Tour wins; played in 1999 Ryder Cup
T26	(Australia) Rick Kulacz	16	6	2 Asian Tour wins
T26	(France) Jean-Baptiste Gonnet	86	45	
T26	(France) Julien Guerrier	16	2	Won the 2006 Amateur Championship; 16th in the Challenge Tour rankings
T26	(Republic of Ireland) Simon Thornton	12	2	
T26	(Scotland) Scott Drummond	180	67	1 European Tour win
T26	(Italy) Lorenzo Gagli	8	3	

2010 European Tour rookie

== 2010 Results ==
Player	Starts	Cuts made	Best finish	Money list rank	Earnings (€)
(England) Simon Khan	28	16	Win	25	972,686
(England) Sam Hutsby*	26	19	T12	118	197,809
(Scotland) Stephen Gallacher	30	23	4	26	931,931
(Paraguay) Marco Ruiz	24	14	T9	131	146,483
(Spain) Alejandro Cañizares	27	22	2	38	806,510
(Sweden) Fredrik Ohlsson*	21	5	T46	214	24,611
(Norway) Eirik Tage Johansen	22	9	T34	165	79,001
(Denmark) Mark Haastrup*	25	10	3	117	203,322
(Scotland) Steven O'Hara	27	17	T8	113	213,769
(Argentina) Clodomiro Carranza*	24	15	8	128	148,908
(France) Benjamin Hébert*	21	12	T25	142	116,834
(Sweden) Fredrik Andersson Hed	27	18	Win	22	1,110,525
(England) Phillip Archer	24	7	T10	151	99,211
(Spain) Carl Suneson	25	9	T8	167	77,277
(England) Jamie Elson	26	12	T2	132	146,021
(South Africa) James Kamte	18	8	T4	157	92,871
(Republic of Ireland) Gary Murphy	25	6	T43	227	19,152
(Scotland) Andrew Coltart	25	12	T11	143	116,090
(Sweden) Steven Jeppesen	23	10	T21	186	51,582
(South Africa) Anton Haig	19	5	T19	153	95,533
(South Africa) George Coetzee*	24	11	T6	126	152,302
(England) James Ruth*	15	4	T56	238	15,194
(Sweden) Patrik Sjöland	21	10	T11	171	65,819
(Germany) Stephan Gross Jr*	18	6	T15	207	29,450
(Sweden) Jarmo Sandelin	22	11	T3	138	128,825
(Australia) Rick Kulacz*	24	11	T4	134	144,949
(France) Jean-Baptiste Gonnet	25	15	T8	109	224,635
(France) Julien Guerrier*	22	12	T5	122	172,305
(Republic of Ireland) Simon Thornton*	22	9	T9	141	116,954
(Scotland) Scott Drummond	20	6	T21	191	49,040
(Italy) Lorenzo Gagli	12	3	10	219	22,720

* European Tour rookie in 2010
T = Tied
The player retained his European Tour card for 2011 (finished inside the top 117).
The player did not retain his European Tour Tour card for 2011, but retained conditional status (finished between 118 and 150).
The player did not retain his European Tour card for 2011 (finished outside the top 150).

Ohlsson, Johansen, and Coetzee regained their cards for 2011 through Q School, while Gagli regained his by finishing 17th in the Challenge Tour rankings.

== Winners on the European Tour in 2010 ==
No.	Date	Player	Tournament	Winning score	Margin of victory	Runner(s)-up
1	9 May	(Sweden) Fredrik Andersson Hed	BMW Italian Open	-16 (70-66-63-73=272)	2 strokes	(England) David Horsey
2	23 May	(England) Simon Khan	BMW PGA Championship	-6 (72-69-71-66=278)	1 stroke	(Sweden) Fredrik Andersson Hed, (England) Luke Donald

== Runners-up on the European Tour in 2010 ==
No.	Date	Player	Tournament	Winner	Winning score	Runner-up score
1	16 May	(Spain) Alejandro Cañizares lost in playoff	Iberdrola Open Cala Millor Mallorca	(Sweden) Peter Hanson	-6 (72-69-67-66=274)	-6 (68-70-70-66=274)
2	23 May	(Sweden) Fredrik Andersson Hed	BMW PGA Championship	(England) Simon Khan	-6 (72-69-71-66=278)	-7 (68-70-74-67=279)
3	20 Jun	(England) Jamie Elson	Saint-Omer Open	(Austria) Martin Wiegele	-7 (66-71-72-68=277)	-5 (71-67-68-73=279)
4	4 Jul	(Spain) Alejandro Cañizares (2) lost in three-man playoff	Alstom Open de France	(Spain) Miguel Ángel Jiménez	-11 (71-69-66-67=273)	-11 (66-66-73-68=273)

== See also ==
- 2009 Challenge Tour graduates
- 2010 European Tour
