= Finnish Masters =

Tournament information
- Location: Vierumäki, Finland
- Established: 1998
- Course: Master Golf Club
- Par: 72
- Length: 6,609 yards (6,043 m)
- Tour: Challenge Tour
- Format: Stroke play
- Prize fund: €132,500
- Month played: August
- Final year: 2000

Tournament record score
- Aggregate: 268 Christian Cévaër (2000)
- To par: −20 as above

Current champion
- (France) Christian Cévaër

Final champion
- Location in Finland

The Finnish Masters was a golf tournament on the Challenge Tour between 1998 and 2000. It was played annually at Master Golf Club in Espoo, Finland.

== Winners ==
Year	Winner	Score	To par	Margin of victory	Runner-up
2000	(France) Christian Cévaër	268	−20	1 stroke	(Sweden) Pehr Magnebrant
1999	(Australia) Lucas Parsons	272	−16	1 stroke	(Denmark) Thomas Nørret
1998	(Italy) Massimo Scarpa	271	−17	1 stroke	(Sweden) Chris Hanell
