= 1991 European Amateur Team Championship =

Golf competition

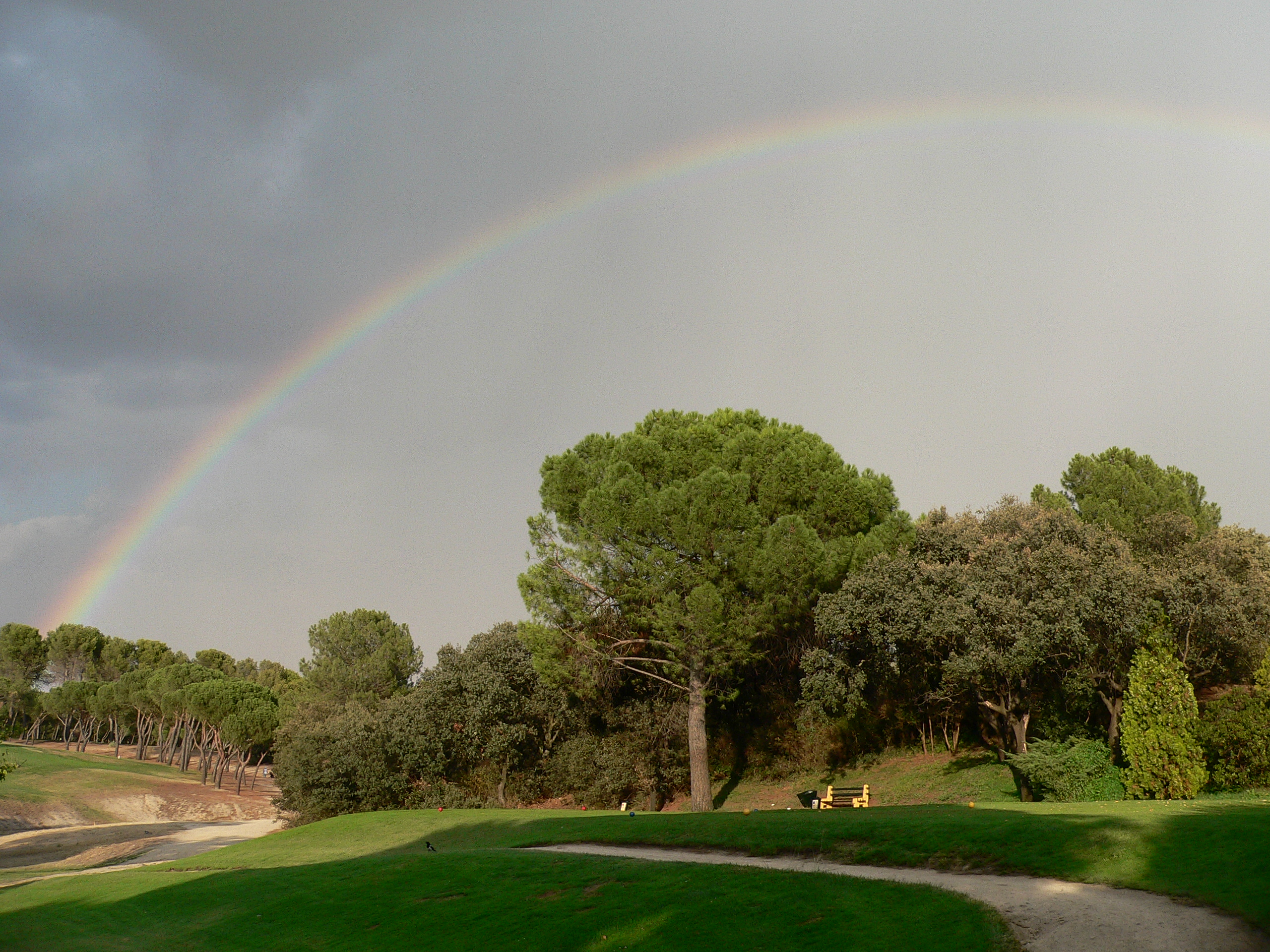
- Course at Puerta de Hierro

Tournament information
- Dates: 26–30 June 1991
- Location: Madrid, Spain; 40.461°N 3.737°W
- Course: Real Club de la Puerta de Hierro
- Organized by: European Golf Association
- Format: Qualification round: 36 holes stroke play Knock-out match-play

Statistics
- Par: 72
- Length: 7,043 yards (6,440 m)
- Field: 19 teams 114 players

Champion
- England; Gary Evans, Ian Garbutt, Jim Payne, Andrew Sandywell, Ricky Willison, Liam White
- Qualification round: 715 (−5); Final match: 5–2

Location map
- Location in Europe Location in Spain Location in Madrid

The 1991 European Amateur Team Championship took place 26–30 June at Real Club de la Puerta de Hierro in Madrid, Spain. It was the 17th men's golf European Amateur Team Championship.

== Venue ==
The hosting club was established in 1895 as a polo club. Its first 18-hole golf course, located in the northwest of Madrid, Spain, in the district of Moncloa, 5 kilometres from the city center, designed by Harry Colt, opened in 1914. Tom Simpson designed a new 9-hole course in the 1940s and John Harris designed another nine holes in 1968. The two 18-hole courses at Puerta de Hierro had previously hosted the Open de España and Madrid Open on the European Tour and the 1970 Eisenhower Trophy.

== Format ==
Each team consisted of six players, playing two rounds of stroke-play over two days, counting the five best scores each day for each team.

The eight best teams formed flight A, in knock-out match-play over the next three days. The teams were seeded based on their positions after the stroke play. The first placed team were drawn to play the quarter-final against the eight placed team, the second against the seventh, the third against the sixth and the fourth against the fifth. Teams were allowed to use six players during the team matches, selecting four of them in the two morning foursome games and five players in to the afternoon single games. Games all square at the 18th hole were declared halved, if the team match was already decided.

The seven teams placed 9–15 in the qualification stroke-play formed flight B and the four teams placed 16–19 formed flight C, to play similar knock-out play, to decide their final positions.

== Teams ==
19 nation teams contested the event. Each team consisted of six players.

Players in the teams

Country	Players
Austria	Marcus Brier, Fritz Poppmeier, Alexander Peterskovki, Rudi Sailer, Hans-Christian Winkler, Mattias Wittman
Belgium	Christophe Bosmans, Filip Govaerts, Arnaud Langenaeken, Dany Vanbegin, Nicolas Vanhootegem, Didier de Vooght
Czechoslovakia	Miroslav Brtek, Pavel Fulin, Jan Kunsta, Jaroslav Hanek, Peter Miruzek, Karel Skopovy
Denmark	Jan Andersen, Thomas Bjørn, Jakob Greisen, Anders Hansen, Henrik Simonsen, Ben Tinning
England	Gary Evans, Ian Garbutt, Jim Payne, Andrew Sandywell, Ricky Willison, Liam White
Finland	Riku Aarnio, Petri Jyras, Petri Pulkkinen, Mikko Rantanen, Juha Selin, Kalle Vainola
France	Ramuntcho Basurco, Christian Cévaër, Frederic Cupillard, François Illouz, Christophe Pottier, Fabrice Tarnaud
Germany	Philip Drewes, Sacha Krauß, Hans-Günther Reiter, Jan-Erik Schapmann, Ekkehart Schieffer, Ulrich Schulte
Iceland	Sigurjor Arnarsson, Thorsteinn Hallgrimeson, Ulfar Jonsson, Svein Sigurbergason, Gudmundur Sveinbjornsson, Bjorn Knutsson
Ireland	Niall Goulding, Pádraig Harrington, Pádraig Hogan, Garth McGimpsey, Paul McGinley, Liam McNamara
Italy	Emanuele Canonica, Massimo Florioli, Marco Cortana, Marcello Santi, Massimo Scarpa, Manuel Zerman
Netherlands	Niels Boysen, Stephane Lovey, Harold Moss, Rolf Muntz, Bart Nolte, Michael Vogel
Norway	Knut Ekjord, Christer Gavelstad, Øyvind Rojahn, Ole Christian Selbekk, Hans-Helge Strøm-Olsen
Scotland	Andrew Coltart, Derek Crawdord, Craig Everett, Garry Hay, Gavin Lawrie, Jim Milligan
Portugal	Alexandre Barroso, Joao Pedro Carvalhosa, Antonio Castelo, Jose Correia, Ricardo Oliveira, Filipe S. Sousa
Spain	Carlos Beautell, Diego Borrego, Luis Gabarda, Ignacio Garrido, Tomás Jesús Muñoz, Borja Queipo de Llano
Sweden	Fredrik Andersson, Max Anglert, Klas Eriksson, Niclas Fasth, Pehr Magnebrant, Rikard Strångert
Switzerland	Andreas Bauer, Dimitri Bieri, Christophe Bovet, Markus Frank, Thomas Gottstein, Dominique Rey
Wales	Andrew Barnett, Garry Houston, Richard Johnson, Andrew Jones, James Lee, Calvin O'Carroll

== Winners ==
Team England won the opening 36-hole stroke-play qualifying competition, with a 5-under-par score of 715, six strokes ahead of host nation Spain.

There was no official award for the lowest individual score, but individual leader was Liam White, England, with a 6-under-par score of 138, two strokes ahead of nearest competitors.

Team England won the gold medal, earning their eighth title, beating team Italy in the final 5–2.

The Netherlands, for the first time on the podium in the history of the championship, earned the bronze on third place, after beating Scotland 4–3 in the bronze match.

== Results ==
Qualification round

Team standings

Place	Country	Score	To par
1	England	355-360=715	−5
2	Spain	364-357=721	+1
3	Italy	362-360=722	+2
4	Scotland	375-351=726	+6
5	France	366-361=727	+7
6	Switzerland	370-359=729	+9
T7	Netherlands *	368-359=734	+14
T7	Austria	360-374=734	+14
9	Denmark	372-363=735	+15
10	Ireland	379-357=736	+16
11	Germany	371-368=739	+19
T12	Wales *	379-366=745	+25
T12	Sweden	371-374=745	+25
14	Norway	387-372=759	+39
15	Portugal	390-372=762	+42
16	Belgium	393-377=770	+50
17	Iceland	387-386=773	+53
18	Finland	392-390=782	+62
19	Czechoslovakia	409-402=811	+91

* Note: In the event of a tie the order was determined by the best total of the two non-counting scores of the two rounds.

Individual leaders

Place	Player	Country	Score	To par
1	Liam White	England	68-70=138	−6
T2	Christian Cévaër	France	69-71=140	−4
T2	Luis Gabarda	Spain	73-67=140	−4
T2	François Illouz	France	69-71=140	−4
T2	Christophe Pottier	France	73-67=140	−4
6	Jim Payne	England	67-74=141	−3
T7	Dimitri Bieri	Switzerland	70-72=142	−2
T7	Anders Hansen	Denmark	72-70=142	−2
T9	Thomas Gottstein	Switzerland	70-73=143	−1
T9	Rudi Sailer	Austria	67-76=143	−1
T9	Marcello Santi	Italy	71-72=143	−1
T9	Massimo Scarpa	Italy	73-70=143	−1
T9	Hans-Helge Strøm-Olsen	Norway	74-69=143	−1

Note: There was no official award for the lowest individual score.

Flight A

Bracket

Quarter finals
Netherlands	4.5
Spain	2.5
Italy	4.5
Switzerland	2.5
Scotland	5
France	2
England	5
Austria	1

Semi finals
Italy	4
Netherlands	3
England	5
Scotland	2

Final
England	5
Italy	2
Bronze match
Netherlands	5
Scotland	3

Elimination matches
Spain	6
Switzerland	1
France	6.5
Austria	0.5

Match for 5th place
Spain	4
France	3
Match for 7th place
Switzerland	5
Austria	2

Final games

England	Italy
5	2
G. Evans / L. White 1 hole	M. Gortana / M. Santi
I. Garbutt / A. Sandywell	M. Florioli / M. Zerman 3 & 2
Ricky Willison 2 holes	Massimo Scarpa
Jim Payne AS *	Massimo Florioli AS *
Andrew Sandywell 6 & 4	Marco Cortana
Liam White 5 & 4	Manuel Zerman
Gary Evans AS *	Marcello Santi AS *

* Note: Game declared halved, since team match already decided.

Flight B

Bracket

Round 1
Ireland	6
Portugal	1
West Germany	4
Norway	3
Wales	5
Sweden	2

Round 2
West Germany	4
Ireland	3
Wales	4.5
Denmark	2.5

Match for 9th place
West Germany	5.5
Wales	1.5
Match for 11th place
Ireland	4
Denmark	3

Elimination match
Norway	5.5
Portugal	1.5

Match for 13th place
Sweden	4
Norway	3

Flight C

Round 1
Iceland	5
Finland	2
Belgium	6
Czech Republic	1

Match for 16th place
Belgium	5.5
Iceland	1.5
Match for 18th place
Finland	5
Czech Republic	2

Final standings

Place	Country
1st place, gold medalist(s)	England
2nd place, silver medalist(s)	Italy
3rd place, bronze medalist(s)	Netherlands
4	Scotland
5	Spain
6	France
7	Switzerland
8	Austria
9	Germany
10	Wales
11	Ireland
12	Denmark
13	Sweden
14	Norway
15	Portugal
16	Belgium
17	Iceland
18	Finland
19	Czechoslovakia

== See also ==
- Eisenhower Trophy – biennial world amateur team golf championship for men organized by the International Golf Federation.
- European Ladies' Team Championship – European amateur team golf championship for women organised by the European Golf Association.
