= Hansabanka Baltic Open =

Golf tournament

Tournament information
- Location: Riga, Latvia
- Established: 2004
- Course: Ozo Golf Club
- Par: 72
- Tour: Nordic Golf League
- Format: Stroke play
- Prize fund: €50,000
- Month played: July
- Final year: 2008

Tournament record score
- Aggregate: 201 Daniel Lindgren (2006)
- To par: −15 as above

Final champion
- (Sweden) Per Barth

Location map
- Location in Latvia

The Hansabanka Baltic Open was a golf tournament on the Swedish Golf Tour and the Nordic Golf League. It was held at the Ozo Golf Club in Riga, Latvia, between 2005 and 2008.

== Winners ==
Year	Winner	Score	To par	Margin of victory	Runner-up	Ref.
2008	(Sweden) Per Barth	202	−14	3 strokes	(Sweden) Petter Bocian	
2007	(Sweden) Andreas Högberg	205	−11	1 stroke	(Sweden) Björn Pettersson	
2006	(Sweden) Daniel Lindgren	201	−15	1 stroke	(Sweden) Pontus Leijon	
2005	(Sweden) Fredrick Månsson	206	−10	1 stroke	(Finland) Tuomas Tuovinen	
2004	(Sweden) Peter Malmgren	204	−12	Playoff	(Finland) Panu Kylliäinen	
