= Kristoffer Broberg =

Swedish professional golfer (born 1986)

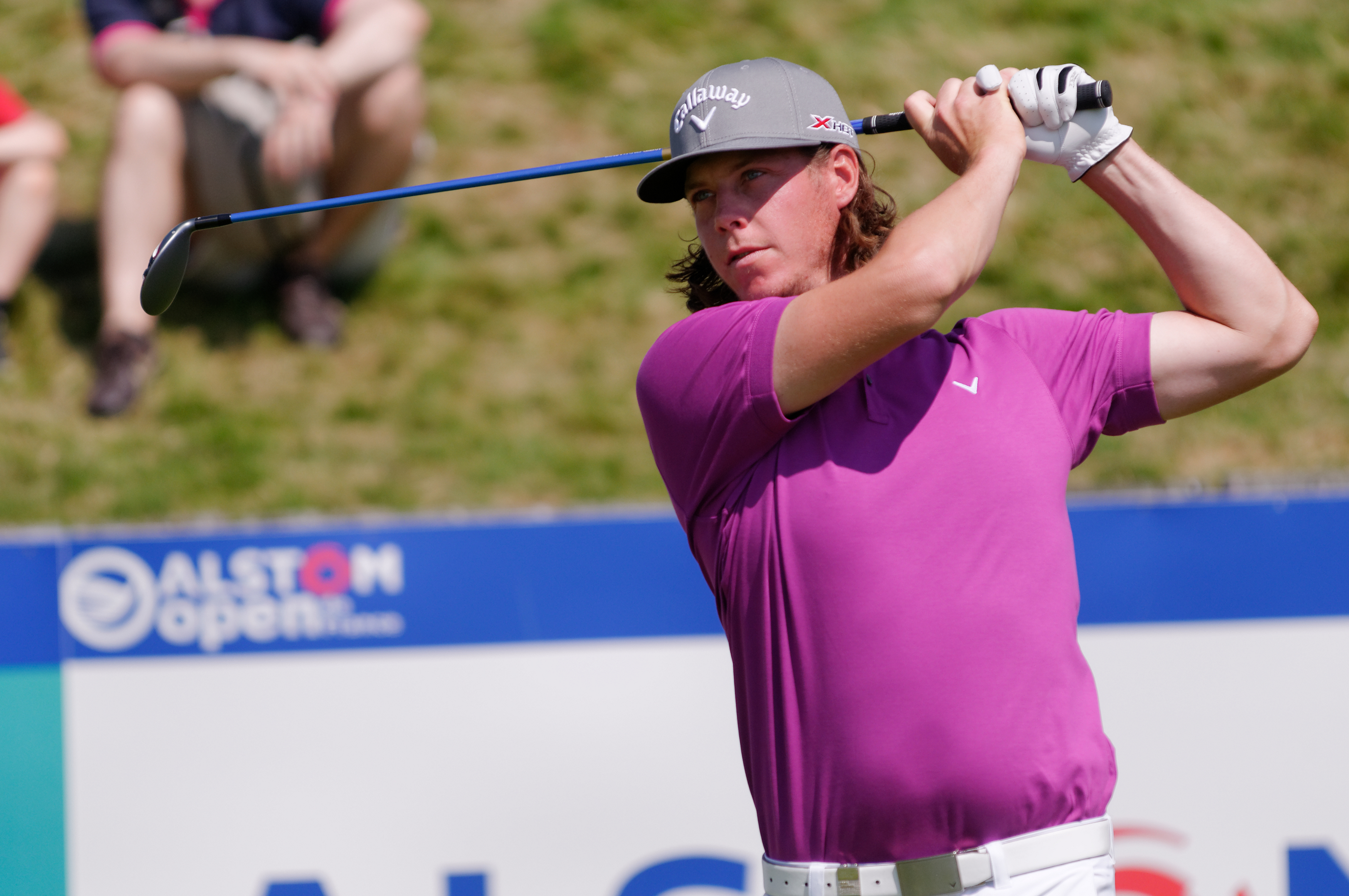
- Broberg at the 2013 Open de France

Personal information
- Full name: Kristoffer Per Thomas Broberg
- Nationality: Sweden
- Born: 1 August 1986 (age 40) Stockholm, Sweden
- Height: 1.83 m (6 ft 0 in)
- Weight: 76 kg (168 lb; 12.0 st)
- Life partner: Victoria Wahrby

Career
- Sport: Golf
- Turned professional: 2010
- Current tours: Asian Tour; Nordic Golf League
- Former tours: European Tour; Challenge Tour
- Professional wins: 13
- Highest ranking: 64 (3 January 2016)

Number of wins by tour
- European Tour: 2
- Challenge Tour: 4
- Other: 7

Best results in major championships
- Masters Tournament: DNP
- PGA Championship: CUT: 2016
- U.S. Open: DNP
- The Open Championship: T32: 2014

Kristoffer Per Thomas Broberg (born 1 August 1986) is a Swedish professional golfer who plays on the Asian Tour.

== Professional career ==
Broberg started his professional career in 2010, winning twice on the Swedish mini tour. The following two years he won four events on the Nordic Golf League.

He qualified to play on the Challenge Tour in 2012. He won the second event he played in, the Finnish Challenge on 5 August. He won again the next week at the Norwegian Challenge. Broberg won for a third time that month at the Rolex Trophy to earn an instant promotion to the European Tour; he was the fastest player ever to achieve this having played just five events in the season. The victories helped Broberg shoot up the Official World Golf Ranking from 1,109th to 173rd, and he ended the year ranked 79th after finishing runner-up at the Alfred Dunhill Championship.

Broberg again came close to capturing his maiden European Tour victory in 2014 when he tied for third in the Irish Open and finished runner-up at the Scottish Open. He also recorded his third career runner-up finish at the Made in Denmark event during the 2015 season.

On 15 November 2015, Broberg won his maiden European Tour title at the BMW Masters, one of the four tournaments that make up the Race to Dubai Final Series. He won in a sudden-death playoff over American Patrick Reed, with a birdie on the first extra hole. This was the 100th win by a Swede in the history of the European Tour and earned Broberg an exemption through to 2017.

In September 2021, Broberg won the Dutch Open. He shot a final-round 72 after having an 8 shot lead after 54 holes, which included shooting a course record score of 64 in the second round and a new course record of 61 in the third round.

== Awards and honors ==
In 2012, he received Elit Sign number 140 by the Swedish Golf Federation based on world ranking achievements.

== Professional wins (13) ==
=== European Tour wins (2) ===
Legend
Race to Dubai finals series (1)
Other European Tour (1)

No.	Date	Tournament	Winning score	Margin of victory	Runner-up
1	15 Nov 2015	BMW Masters	−17 (69-70-64-68=271)	Playoff	(United States) Patrick Reed
2	19 Sep 2021	Dutch Open	−23 (68-64-61-72=265)	3 strokes	(Germany) Matti Schmid

European Tour playoff record (1–0)

No.	Year	Tournament	Opponent	Result
1	2015	BMW Masters	(United States) Patrick Reed	Won with birdie on first extra hole

=== Challenge Tour wins (4) ===
No.	Date	Tournament	Winning score	Margin of victory	Runner-up
1	5 Aug 2012	Finnish Challenge	−15 (69-66-66-68=269)	6 strokes	(Netherlands) Wil Besseling
2	12 Aug 2012	Norwegian Challenge	−22 (67-64-65-70=266)	Playoff	(Spain) Álvaro Velasco
3	25 Aug 2012	Rolex Trophy	−27 (63-66-64-68=261)	1 stroke	(United States) Sihwan Kim
4	21 Oct 2012	Crowne Plaza Copenhagen Challenge	−14 (67-70-66-67=270)	3 strokes	(England) Simon Wakefield

Challenge Tour playoff record (1–0)

No.	Year	Tournament	Opponent	Result
1	2012	Norwegian Challenge	(Spain) Álvaro Velasco	Won with birdie on second extra hole

=== Nordic Golf League wins (3) ===
No.	Date	Tournament	Winning score	Margin of victory	Runner-up
1	2 Jul 2011	Mørk Masters	−25 (63-64-64=191)	4 strokes	(Denmark) Morten Ørum Madsen
2	21 Jun 2012	Nordea Open	−9 (71-69-67=207)	2 strokes	(Sweden) Simon Forsström
3	6 Jul 2012	Katrineholm Open	−10 (72-70-64=206)	1 stroke	(Sweden) Johan Carlsson

=== Other wins (4) ===
No.	Date	Tournament	Winning score	Margin of victory	Runner(s)-up
1	10 May 2008	Simlings Bil Open Gripsholm (as an amateur)	−7 (70-69=139)	2 strokes	(Sweden) Alexander Bergström, (Sweden) Joakim Renström
2	2 Sep 2010	Sörmlands Sparbank Open	−9 (68-67=135)	4 strokes	(Sweden) Jacob Glennemo
3	3 Sep 2010	Septemberpokalen	−9 (65-68=133)	7 strokes	(Sweden) Christoffer Baumann
4	22 Apr 2012	Abbekås Open	−6 (67-71=138)	2 strokes	(Sweden) Jacob Glennemo

== Results in major championships ==
Tournament	2014	2015	2016
Masters Tournament			
U.S. Open			
The Open Championship	T32		CUT
PGA Championship			CUT

Did not play

CUT = missed the half-way cut
"T" = tied

== Results in World Golf Championships ==
Tournament	2016
Championship	64
Match Play	
Invitational	
Champions	

Did not play

== Team appearances ==
Professional

- EurAsia Cup (representing Europe): 2016 (winners)

== See also ==
- 2012 Challenge Tour graduates
- 2017 European Tour Qualifying School graduates
- 2023 European Tour Qualifying School graduates
- List of golfers with most Challenge Tour wins
- List of golfers to achieve a three-win promotion from the Challenge Tour
