= 1999 Nordic Golf League =

Golf tour season

1999 Nordic Golf League season
- Duration: 18 May 1999 – 26 September 1999
- Number of official events: 25
- Most wins: (Finland) Mikael Piltz (4)
- Order of Merit: (Sweden) Patrik Gottfridson

The 1999 Nordic Golf League was the inaugural season of the Nordic Golf League, a third-tier tour recognised by the European Tour.

== Schedule ==
The following table lists official events during the 1999 season.

Date	Tournament	Host country	Purse	Winner (Note: The number in brackets after each winner's name is the number of Nordic Golf League events they had won up to and including that tournament. It is rare for someone to accumulate many wins on the Nordic Golf League as success at this level usually leads to promotion to the Challenge Tour.)
19 May	P4 Open	Norway	NKr 100,000	(Norway) Morten Haerås (1)
22 May	Möre Hotell Open	Sweden	SKr 100,000	(Sweden) Peter Malmgren (1)
22 May	Synsam Open	Norway	NKr 100,000	(Sweden) Fredrik Eskelid (1)
30 May	Kinnaborg Open	Sweden	SKr 100,000	(Sweden) Richard S. Johnson (1)
6 Jun	Kiitolinja Open	Finland	FIM 60,000	(Finland) Mikael Piltz (1)
6 Jun	Stavanger Open	Norway	NKr 100,000	(Sweden) Fredrik Widmark (1)
20 Jun	Canon Masters	Finland	FIM 50,000	(Finland) Mikael Piltz (2)
20 Jun	Husqvarna Open	Sweden	SKr 210,000	(Sweden) Björn Pettersson (1)
27 Jun	Vår Bank & Försäkringar Open	Norway	NKr 100,000	(Sweden) Fredrik Widmark (2)
4 Jul	UPM-Kymmene Open	Finland	FIM 50,000	(Finland) Antti Ulvio (1)
11 Jul	Hofors Open	Sweden	SKr 125,000	(Sweden) Markus Westerberg (1)
24 Jul	DSV Hook Masters	Sweden	SKr 250,000	(Sweden) Patrik Gottfridsson (1)
25 Jul	Audi Trophy	Finland	FIM 60,000	(Finland) Mikael Piltz (3)
1 Aug	Isaberg Rapid Open	Sweden	SKr 100,000	(Finland) Johan Annerfelt (1)
12 Aug	GE Capital Bank Open	Sweden	SKr 200,000	(Sweden) Peter Gustafsson (1)
15 Aug	Audi Tourin	Finland	FIM 60,000	(Finland) Mika Lehtinen (1)
15 Aug	PGA Braathens Championship	Norway	NKr 200,000	(Norway) Morten Hagen (1)
22 Aug	Västerås Open	Sweden	SKr 150,000	(Sweden) Ville Lemon (1)
29 Aug	Scandic Hotel Danish Open	Denmark	DKr 150,000	(Denmark) Anders Schmidt Hansen (a) (1)
29 Aug	Skandia PGA Open	Sweden	SKr 225,000	(Sweden) Per Larsson (1)
12 Sep	Finnish PGA Championship	Finland	FIM 75,000	(Finland) Mikael Piltz (4)
12 Sep	Siemens Open	Norway	NKr 100,000	(Norway) Øyvind Rojahn (1)
19 Sep	DFDS Tor Line Open	Sweden	SKr 400,000	(Sweden) Patrik Gottfridsson (2)
24 Sep	Audi Open Finale	Norway	NKr 100,000	(Sweden) Peter Gustafsson (2)
26 Sep	Tomelilla Open	Sweden	SKr 125,000	(Sweden) Fredrik Widmark (3)

== Order of Merit ==
The Order of Merit was based on tournament results during the season, calculated using a points-based system.

Position	Player	Points
1	(Sweden) Patrik Gottfridson	28,516
2	(Finland) Mikael Piltz	22,903
3	(Sweden) Klas Eriksson	21,835
4	(Denmark) Thomas Nørret	20,744
5	(Sweden) Raimo Sjöberg	20,341

== See also ==
- 1999 Swedish Golf Tour
