= Fredrik Ohlsson (golfer) =

Swedish professional golfer

Personal information
- Nationality: Sweden
- Born: 4 September 1979 (age 47) Gothenburg, Sweden
- Height: 1.78 m (5 ft 10 in)
- Weight: 73 kg (161 lb; 11.5 st)

Career
- Sport: Golf
- College: Francis Marion University
- Turned professional: 2004
- Former tours: European Tour; Challenge Tour
- Professional wins: 1

Fredrik Ohlsson (born 4 September 1979) is a Swedish professional golfer.

== Career ==
Ohlsson spent four years playing golf at Francis Marion University in the United States, and turned professional after graduating in 2004. He spent his early career playing on the third tier Nordic League in Scandinavia, where he won once. In 2007 he qualified to play on the Challenge Tour, and spent three years at that level, recording two top-10s in 2008. At the end of 2009, he came through qualifying school to join the European Tour for the first time. Despite a disappointing first season, he returned to the school and regained his playing rights for 2011.

== Professional wins (1) ==
=== Nordic Golf League wins (1) ===
No.	Date	Tournament	Winning score	Margin of victory	Runner-up
1	22 Jun 2006	Herning Open	−9 (68-67-72=207)	2 strokes	(Denmark) Christoffer Lange

== See also ==
- 2009 European Tour Qualifying School graduates
- 2010 European Tour Qualifying School graduates
