= Max Anglert =

Swedish professional golfer

Personal information
- Full name: Max Ola Anglert
- Nationality: Sweden
- Born: 10 February 1971 (age 55) Stockholm, Sweden
- Height: 1.87 m (6 ft 2 in)
- Spouse: Petra Maria

Career
- Sport: Golf
- Turned professional: 1994
- Former tours: European Tour; Challenge Tour
- Professional wins: 2

Number of wins by tour
- Challenge Tour: 1
- Other: 1

Max Ola Anglert (born 10 February 1971) is a Swedish professional golfer, winner of the EGA Trophy and European Youths' Team Championship in 1992. In 1996 he won the Kentab/RBG Open on the Challenge Tour and joined the European Tour.

== Amateur career ==
Anglert was a leading amateur golfer and represented his country at boy, youth and senior levels. With the Swedish team, he finished third at the 1989 European Boys' Team Championship, won the 1992 European Youths' Team Championship, and finished fourth at the 1993 European Amateur Team Championship.

Anglert won the 1992 EGA Trophy in Germany, together with players such as Thomas Bjørn and Niclas Fasth. Representing the Continent of Europe he beat a Great Britain & Ireland team led by Pádraig Harrington. Representing Sweden at the Eisenhower Trophy he finished 5th in 1992 together with Niclas Fasth, Richard Stångert and Fredrik Andersson.

== Professional career ==
Anglert turned professional in 1994 and joined the Challenge Tour, where he won the Kentab/RBG Open and was runner-up at the Club Med Open in 1996. After a successful visit to the Qualifying School, he joined the 1996 European Tour, where he played until he retired from tour after the 2000 season, except in 1998. On the 1998 Challenge Tour, he had four top-10 finishes, including runner-up finishes at the Netcom Norwegian Open and Russian Open, to graduate to the main tour in 11th position on the rankings. His best finishes on the European Tour were 8th, at the 1996 Austrian Open and the 1997 South African PGA Championship, and he finished 122nd on the 1997 Order of Merit. In 2002, he won the Sundbyholm Open on the Swedish Golf Tour and Nordic Golf League.

== Professional wins (2) ==
=== Challenge Tour wins (1) ===
No.	Date	Tournament	Winning score	Margin of victory	Runner-up
1	1 Sep 1996	Kentab/RBG Open	−14 (69-67-66=202)	1 stroke	(Sweden) Dennis Edlund

=== Nordic Golf League wins (1) ===
No.	Date	Tournament	Winning score	Margin of victory	Runner-up
1	14 Jul 2002	Sundbyholm Open	−8 (71-69-68=208)	3 strokes	(Sweden) Jonas Wallmo

== Team appearances ==
Amateur

- European Boys' Team Championship (representing Sweden): 1989
- European Youths' Team Championship (representing Sweden): 1992 (winners)
- European Amateur Team Championship (representing Sweden): 1991, 1993
- Eisenhower Trophy (representing Sweden): 1992
- EGA Trophy (representing the Continent of Europe): 1992 (winners)
