= Pontus Leijon =

Swedish professional golfer

Personal information
- Full name: Per Henrik Pontus Leijon
- Nationality: Sweden
- Born: 27 October 1978 (age 48) Örkelljunga, Sweden
- Height: 178 cm (5 ft 10 in)

Career
- Sport: Golf
- Turned professional: 2001
- Former tours: Challenge Tour; Nordic Golf League; Swedish Golf Tour
- Professional wins: 3

Achievements and awards
- Nordic Golf League Order of Merit winner: 2006
- PGA of Sweden Future Fund Award: 2007

Per Henrik Pontus Leijon (born 27 October 1978) is a Swedish professional golfer and former Challenge Tour player.

== Career ==
Leijon was a promising junior golfer and represented Örkelljunga Golf Club. He won the 1998 Swedish Junior Matchplay Championship at Lyckorna Golf Club and joined the Swedish Golf Tour in 1999. He turned professional in 2001, and attended European Tour Qualifying School from 2002.

His breakthrough came in 2006, when he was runner-up at the Winter Series #3 in Portugal and Hansabanka Baltic Open in Latvia, before winning the Aller Masters in Denmark and the Telia Tour Final at Rya Golf Club. He topped the Nordic Golf League Order of Merit to graduate to the Challenge Tour. His best finish as a rookie on the Challenge Tour was a tie for 8th at the NÖ Open in Austria. He finished 95th in the rankings to keep playing in 2008.

Leijon was runner-up to Jonas Blixt at Lyckorna Scratch in 2008, and he won the 2010 Titleist Trophy at La Manga Club in Spain. In 2012, he recorded several runner-up finishes, including at the Söderby Masters and Finnish Open. He also lost a playoff to Johan Carlsson at the Nordea Tour Championship, to finish fourth in the Nordic Golf League Order of Merit and again earn promotion to the Challenge Tour.

He retired from tour after the 2013 Black Mountain Invitational in Thailand.

== Personal life ==
Leijon competed as Pontus Ericsson until he married fellow professional golfer Hanna-Sofia Leijon to settle in Kungsbacka Municipality near Gothenburg.

== Amateur wins ==
- 1998 Swedish Junior Matchplay Championship

== Professional wins (3) ==
=== Nordic Golf League wins (2) ===
No.	Date	Tournament	Winning score	Margin of victory	Runner-up
1	9 Aug 2006	Aller Masters	−19 (66-65-66=197)	4 strokes	(Finland) Jaakko Mäkitalo
2	17 Mar 2010	Titleist Trophy	−8 (73-66-72=211)	1 stroke	(Sweden) Mårten Milling

=== Swedish Golf Tour wins (1) ===
No.	Date	Tournament	Winning score	Margin of victory	Runners-up
1	6 Oct 2006	Telia Tour Final	−11 (65-68-69=202)	4 strokes	(Sweden) Fredrik Hammarberg, (Sweden) Robert Wahlin
