= Johan Carlsson (golfer) =

Swedish professional golfer (born 1986)

Personal information
- Full name: Johan Gustav Carlsson
- Nationality: Sweden
- Born: 29 August 1986 (age 40) Gothenburg, Sweden
- Height: 1.93 m (6 ft 4 in)
- Weight: 89 kg (196 lb; 14.0 st)

Career
- Sport: Golf
- College: San Diego State University
- Turned professional: 2011
- Former tours: European Tour; Challenge Tour; Nordic Golf League; Swedish Golf Tour
- Professional wins: 3

Number of wins by tour
- Challenge Tour: 1
- Other: 2

Achievements and awards
- Swedish Golf Tour Order of Merit winner: 2012

Johan Gustav Carlsson (born 29 August 1986) is a Swedish former professional golfer who played five seasons on the European Tour. He won the 2013 Kazakhstan Open on the Challenge Tour.

== Amateur career ==
In 2006, Carlsson played for the national team at the European Youths' Team Championship in Italy and won the Gambro Open on the Swedish Golf Tour as an amateur.

He attended San Diego State University from 2007 to 2011 and played with the San Diego State Aztecs men's golf team.

== Professional career ==
Carlsson turned professional after graduating in 2011 and joined and Nordic Golf League mid-season. In 2012, he won the Nordea Tour Championship and finished second in the NGL Order of Merit, to earn one of five places on the Challenge Tour in 2013.

He captured his maiden Challenge Tour title in September 2013 at the Kazakhstan Open, outpacing Tyrrell Hatton, Adrián Otaegui and Duncan Stewart in second by seven strokes. He finished his rookie season fifth in the Challenge Tour standings, to graduate to the European Tour for 2014.

Carlsson played on the European Tour five season from 2014 to 2018. His best season was in 2016 when he finished 75th on the Order of Merit, and his best individual performance came in 2017 when he finished third in the Saltire Energy Paul Lawrie Match Play, behind only Adrián Otaegui and Marcel Siem. He retired from professional golf in 2020.

== Amateur wins ==
- 2004 Sotenäs Junior Open
- 2005 Sotenäs Junior Open
- 2006 Deloitte Sotenäs Junior Open

== Professional wins (3) ==
=== Challenge Tour wins (1) ===
No.	Date	Tournament	Winning score	Margin of victory	Runners-up
1	22 Sep 2013	Kazakhstan Open	−18 (69-67-67-67=270)	7 strokes	(England) Tyrrell Hatton, (Spain) Adrián Otaegui, (Scotland) Duncan Stewart

=== Nordic Golf League wins (2) ===
No.	Date	Tournament	Winning score	Margin of victory	Runner-up
1	19 May 2006	Gambro Open (as an amateur)	−6 (69-69-66=204)	Playoff	(Sweden) Per Barth
2	30 Sep 2012	Nordea Tour Championship	−9 (69-67-71=207)	Playoff	(Sweden) Pontus Leijon

== Team appearances ==
Amateur

- European Youths' Team Championship (representing Sweden): 2006

== See also ==
- 2013 Challenge Tour graduates
