= Ozo Golf Club =

Golf club and golf course in Riga, Latvia

- Interactive map of Ozo Golf Club
- 57°1′48″N 24°8′26″E

Club information
- Location: Riga, Latvia
- Established: 2002
- Type: semi-private
- Owner: Sandis Ozoliņš
- Tota holes: 18
- Tournaments: Hansabanka Baltic Open
- Website: www.ozogolf.lv
- Designed by: Rob Swedberg

Ozo Golf Club is a golf club and course on the west bank of the Ķīšezers lake in Riga, Latvia. It is the national training centre for Latvian golf teams – and host to both the national tournament and the Baltic tournament. The club opened in 2002 and is owned by the retired Latvian ice hockey player Sandis Ozoliņš.
