= 1992 Eisenhower Trophy =

Tournament information
- Dates: October 1–4
- Location: Vancouver, Canada; 49°15′39″N 123°06′50″W
- Courses: Capilano Golf & Country Club; Marine Drive Golf Club
- Format: 72 holes stroke play

Statistics
- Par: 70 (Capilano); 70 (Marine Drive)
- Field: 49 teams 195 players

Champion
- New Zealand; Michael Campbell, Grant Moorhead, Stephen Scahill & Phil Tataurangi
- 823 (−17)

Location map
- Location in Canada Location in British Columbia

The 1992 Eisenhower Trophy took place October 1 to 4 at Capilano Golf & Country Club and Marine Drive Golf Club near Vancouver, Canada. It was the 18th World Amateur Team Championship for the Eisenhower Trophy. The tournament was a 72-hole stroke play team event with 49 four-man teams, 10 more than the previous highest, which was 39. The best three scores for each round counted towards the team total. The leading teams played the third round at Marine Drive and the final round at Capilano. This was the first time two courses were used for the championship.

New Zealand won the Eisenhower Trophy for the first time, finishing seven strokes ahead of the silver medalists, United States. Australia and France tied for third place and took bronze medals. Phil Tataurangi had the lowest individual score, 9-under-par 271, one stroke better than fellow-New Zealander Michael Campbell.

== Teams ==
49 teams contested the event. Each team had four players with the exception of India who only had three.

The following table lists the players on the leading teams.

Country	Players
Australia	David Armstrong, Steve Collins, Stephen Leaney, Lucas Parsons
Canada	Graham Cooke, Todd Fanning, Darren Ritchie, Doug Roxburgh
France	Grégoire Brizay, Christian Cévaër, Sébastien Delagrange, Frédéric Cupillard
Germany	Ulrich Eckhardt, Thomas Himmel, Hans-Günter Reiter, Jan-Erik Schapmann
Great Britain & Ireland	Raymond Burns, Bradley Dredge, Dean Robertson, Matt Stanford
Netherlands	Willem-Oege Goslings, Rolf Muntz, Bart Nolte, Michael Vogel
New Zealand	Michael Campbell, Grant Moorhead, Stephen Scahill, Phil Tataurangi
Norway	Reidar Brekke, Knut Ekjord, Øyvind Rojahn, Hans-Helge Strøm-Olsen
Spain	Carlos Beautell, Ignacio Garrido, Alvaro Prat, Francisco Valera
Sweden	Fredrik Andersson, Max Anglert, Niclas Fasth, Rikard Strångert
United States	Allen Doyle, David Duval, Justin Leonard, Jay Sigel

== Scores ==
Place	Country	Score	To par
1st place, gold medalist(s)	New Zealand	205-203-208-207=823	−17
2nd place, silver medalist(s)	United States	206-205-203-216=830	−10
3rd place, bronze medalist(s)	Australia	205-207-219-211=842	+2
3rd place, bronze medalist(s)	France	204-218-208-212=842	+2
5	Sweden	209-213-215-211=848	+8
6	Germany	213-213-217-206=849	+9
7	Great Britain & Ireland	206-218-209-217=850	+10
T8	Netherlands	215-221-214-212=862	+22
T8	Norway	213-218-212-219=862	+22
T8	Spain	214-224-212-212=862	+22
11	Canada	213-208-225-217=863	+23
12	Italy	212-221-214-218=865	+25
13	Denmark	210-218-218-220=866	+26
14	Chinese Taipei	214-212-213-232=871	+31
15	Switzerland	214-219-223-218=874	+34
16	Philippines	214-219-221-221=875	+35
T17	Brazil	217-220-215-224=876	+36
T17	Greece	213-223-221-219=876	+36
T17	Zimbabwe	219-216-212-229=876	+36
20	Belgium	218-219-215-227=879	+39
21	Japan	221-221-219-219=880	+40
22	Colombia	215-217-220-233=885	+45
23	Austria	221-221-219-225=886	+46
24	South Korea	222-223-220-222=887	+47
25	Argentina	220-219-221-228=888	+48
26	Finland	220-221-220-228=889	+49
27	Portugal	217-222-219-233=891	+51
28	Hong Kong	218-227-223-226=894	+54
29	Mexico	223-218-224-231=896	+56
30	Malaysia	224-224-220-230=898	+58
T31	India	225-222-231-225=903	+63
T31	Puerto Rico	214-228-229-232=903	+63
33	Chile	224-220-229-233=906	+66
34	Pakistan	229-220-235-223=907	+67
35	Costa Rica	218-238-225-227=908	+68
T36	Morocco	234-225-232-225=916	+76
T36	Singapore	223-238-227-228=916	+76
38	Peru	223-233-230-233=919	+79
39	Bahamas	231-231-227-237=926	+86
40	Bermuda	230-234-239-234=937	+97
41	Ivory Coast	228-227-248-235=938	+98
42	Czechoslovakia	224-245-236-236=941	+101
43	Luxembourg	231-240-238-249=958	+118
44	Papua New Guinea	232-250-251-237=970	+130
45	Israel	238-244-241-248=971	+131
T46	Guatemala	241-237-251-246=975	+135
T46	Nicaragua	246-240-247-242=975	+135
48	Cook Islands	250-251-248-250=999	+159
49	El Salvador	260-254-258-254=1026	+186

== Individual leaders ==
There was no official recognition for the lowest individual scores.

Place	Player	Country	Score	To par
1	Phil Tataurangi	New Zealand	67-67-68-69=271	−9
2	Michael Campbell	New Zealand	67-66-70-69=272	−8
3	David Duval	United States	69-68-65-71=273	−7
4	Lucas Parsons	Australia	69-65-74-68=276	−4
5	Niclas Fasth	Sweden	69-68-73-67=277	−3
T6	Christian Cévaër	France	69-70-68-71=278	−2
T6	Justin Leonard	United States	70-66-70-72=278	−2
8	Michael Vogel	Netherlands	71-71-69-68=279	−1
T9	Allen Doyle	United States	67-72-68-73=280	E
T9	Matt Stanford	Great Britain & Ireland	71-70-66-73=280	E
