= Crowne Plaza Copenhagen Challenge =

Golf tournament

Tournament information
- Location: Copenhagen, Denmark
- Established: 2012
- Course: Royal Golf Club
- Par: 71
- Length: 7,045 yards (6,442 m)
- Tour: Challenge Tour
- Format: Stroke play
- Prize fund: €140,000
- Month played: October
- Final year: 2012

Tournament record score
- Aggregate: 270 Kristoffer Broberg (2012)
- To par: −14 as above

Final champion
- (Sweden) Kristoffer Broberg
- Location in Denmark

The Crowne Plaza Copenhagen Challenge was a golf tournament on the Challenge Tour, played at the Royal Golf Club in Copenhagen, Denmark. It was played for the only time in 2012.

== Winners ==
Year	Winner	Score	To par	Margin of victory	Runner-up
2012	(Sweden) Kristoffer Broberg	270	−14	3 strokes	(England) Simon Wakefield
