= Niclas Fasth =

Swedish professional golfer

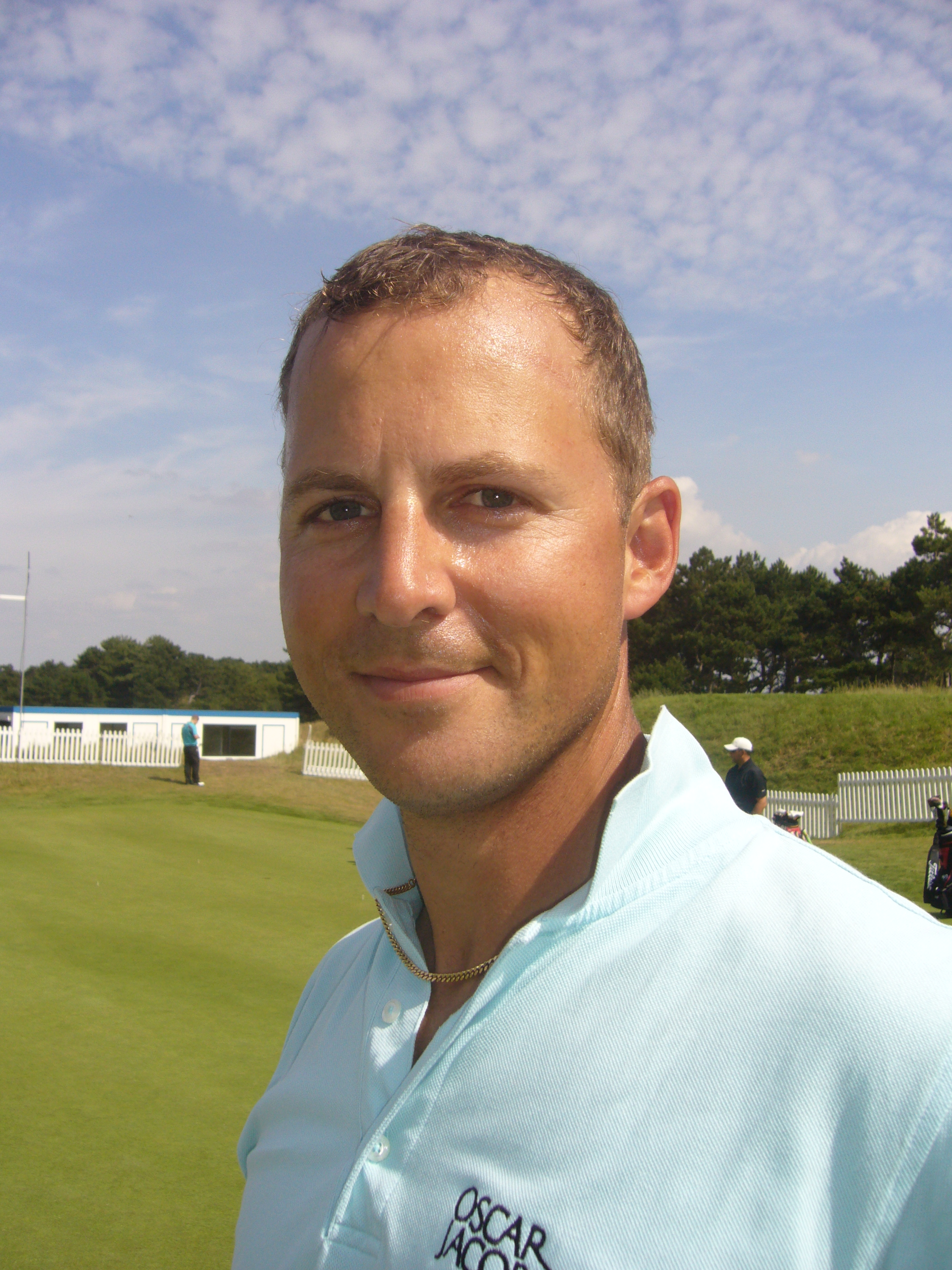

Personal information
- Full name: Niclas Krister Fasth
- Nationality: Sweden
- Born: 29 April 1972 (age 54) Gothenburg, Sweden
- Height: 1.80 m (5 ft 11 in)
- Weight: 79 kg (174 lb; 12.4 st)
- Spouse: Marie (m. 2002)
- Children: 2

Career
- Sport: Golf
- Turned professional: 1993
- Former tours: PGA Tour; European Tour; Challenge Tour
- Professional wins: 11
- Highest ranking: 18 (7 October 2007)

Number of wins by tour
- European Tour: 6
- PGA Tour of Australasia: 1
- Challenge Tour: 4

Best results in major championships
- Masters Tournament: T39: 2008
- PGA Championship: T10: 2003
- U.S. Open: 4th: 2007
- The Open Championship: 2nd: 2001

Achievements and awards
- Swedish Golf Tour Order of Merit winner: 1993

Niclas Krister Fasth (born 29 April 1972) is a Swedish professional golfer, who has won six times on the European Tour. He has finished second in the 2001 Open Championship and fourth in the 2007 U.S. Open and represented Europe winning the 2002 Ryder Cup.

== Early life ==
Fasth was born in Gothenburg. In 1982, when he was 10 years old, his parents bought a summer house close to Lysegården Golf Club in Kungälv, north of Gothenburg. His family, with father Kristher, mother Inga-Lill and younger sister Jessica, used to spend their summers there and began playing golf. With a lot of friends also playing the game, young Fasth was always at the golf course, practiced a lot and showed early talent.

Beside golf, Fasth practiced other sports and during winter time also showed talent in ice hockey.

At 16 years of age, he was adopted at the Swedish upper secondary sports school in Mark, outside Borås, to combine studying with golf training. The school won the Swedish School Championship in 1988, with Fasth winning individually, and represented Sweden at the international final in England.

== Amateur career ==
In 1990, Fasth won the Swedish Teen-Tour Order of Merit for boys up to 19.

In 1991, he won the Greek Open Amateur Championship at Glyfada, Athens, with a new 72-hole tournament record 289, and the year after he was the Swedish Junior Match-play Champion, winning the final on the last hole at Kalmar Golf Club.

Fasth was the only amateur to make the cut at the 1992 Scandinavian Masters on the European Tour at Barsebäck Golf & Country Club in Sweden, finishing tied 35th, 10 strokes behind winner, world number one, Nick Faldo.

He represented Sweden on all age levels. In 1992, he was part of the winning Swedish team at the European Youths' Team Championship in Helsinki, Finland, beating England in the final. Later that year, as one of the four best amateurs in the country, he was part of the Swedish team at the 1992 Eisenhower Trophy at Capilano Golf & Country Club, outside Vancouver, Canada, finishing 5th as a team and Fasth best Swede 5th individually.

== Professional career ==
He turned professional in 1993 and began playing on the Asia Golf Circuit, where his best finish was runner-up at the Sampoerna Indonesia Open, losing in a playoff against Gary Webb. Later during his first year as a professional he won three events on the European second tier Challenge Tour, two of them co-sanctioned by the Swedish Golf Tour, why he was awarded the 1993 season Swedish Golf Tour Order of Merit winner. From 1994 until 2018, he played regularly on the European Tour, every season except for 1999.

He qualified for the U.S.-based PGA Tour at the 1997 Qualifying School, and played the PGA and European Tours concurrently in 1998, without success and in 1999 found himself back on the Challenge Tour. Since then he concentrated on playing in Europe.

He finished tenth on the 2001 European Tour Order of Merit, after being lone runner-up to David Duval at the 2001 Open Championship at Royal Lytham & St Annes Golf Club, England. After a closing round of 67, Fasth advanced from tied 20th and was the leader in the club house for two hours, before late starting Duval also closed with 67 and won by three strokes.

His 2001 performances enabled Fasth to qualify for the European team at the 2002 Ryder Cup, at The Belfry, England, where he contributed to a European 15½ to 12½ victory, with a halved match against Paul Azinger in the Sunday singles.

In both 2005 and 2006, Fasth won twice on the European Tour and finished 13th and 15th respectively on the Order of Merit.

He finished lone fourth at the 2007 U.S. Open at Oakmont Country Club, Pennsylvania, two strokes after winner Ángel Cabrera. The week after, Fasth won his sixth European Tour event, the BMW International Open in Munich, Germany, ahead of home hero Bernhard Langer. These performances helped Fasth to a career best fifth-place finish on the 2007 European Tour Order of Merit.

In 2018, he only played a few tournaments on the European Tour and his last tournament came to be the 2018 Scandinavian Invitation on his home club, Hills Golf and Sports Club, after which he retired from tournament golf.

Fasth has featured in the top 20 of the Official World Golf Ranking with a personal best of 18th for three weeks in October 2007.

After turning 50, in April 2022, Fasth became eligible for senior tournaments, why he came back to tournament golf. The first year he played eleven tournaments on the European Senior Tour, renamed the Legends Tour, making eight cuts and finished 60th on the 2022 Legends Tour Order of Merit. His best finish was tied 15th at the Farmfoods European Senior Masters.

His equipment sponsor has always been Callaway Golf.

Since 2019, after his regular competitive career, Fasth has worked for the Swedish Golf Federation, as an adviser and coach for the Swedish national amateur team.

== Personal life ==
Fasth is married to Marie and they have two children.

During his regular golf career, he has lived in Monaco and London, England, but resides in Gothenburg, Sweden, since 2014 and represents Hills Golf and Sports Club.

== Awards and honors ==
- In 1997, Fasth earned Elite Sign No. 108 by the Swedish Golf Federation, on the basis of national team appearances and national championship performances.
- In 2003, the three Swedish teammates of the victorious European Ryder Cup team the previous year, Fasth, Pierre Fulke and Jesper Parnevik, was each, by the Swedish Golf Federation, awarded the Golden Club, the highest award for contributions to Swedish golf, as the 30th, 31st and 32nd recipients.
- In 2003 Fasth was awarded honorary member of the Swedish PGA.

== Amateur wins ==
- 1991 Greek Open Amateur Championship
- 1992 Swedish Junior Match-Play Championship

== Professional wins (10) ==
=== European Tour wins (6) ===
No.	Date	Tournament	Winning score	Margin of victory	Runner(s)-up
1	19 Mar 2000	Madeira Island Open	−9 (66-72-68-73=279)	2 strokes	(England) Mark Davis, (Scotland) Ross Drummond, (Sweden) Richard S. Johnson
2	13 Feb 2005	Holden New Zealand Open^{1}	−22 (65-63-75-63=266)	Playoff	(England) Miles Tunnicliff
3	24 Jul 2005	Deutsche Bank Players Championship of Europe	−14 (68-66-72-68=274)	Playoff	(Argentina) Ángel Cabrera
4	30 Apr 2006	Andalucía Open de España Valle Romano	−18 (67-68-66-69=270)	Playoff	(England) John Bickerton
5	22 Oct 2006	Mallorca Classic	−5 (66-71-70-68=275)	3 strokes	(Spain) Sergio García
6	24 Jun 2007	BMW International Open	−13 (67-65-73-70=275)	2 strokes	(Germany) Bernhard Langer, (Portugal) José-Filipe Lima

^{1}Co-sanctioned by the PGA Tour of Australasia

European Tour playoff record (3–1)

No.	Year	Tournament	Opponent(s)	Result
1	2002	Murphy's Irish Open	(England) Richard Bland, (South Africa) Darren Fichardt, (Denmark) Søren Hansen	Hansen won with birdie on fourth extra hole Bland eliminated by birdie on second hole
2	2005	Holden New Zealand Open	(England) Miles Tunnicliff	Won with birdie on second extra hole
3	2005	Deutsche Bank Players Championship of Europe	(Argentina) Ángel Cabrera	Won with birdie on third extra hole
4	2006	Andalucía Open de España Valle Romano	(England) John Bickerton	Won with birdie on fourth extra hole

=== Challenge Tour wins (4) ===
No.	Date	Tournament	Winning score	Margin of victory	Runner-up
1	25 Jul 1993	Västerås Open	−10 (67-66-64=197)	1 stroke	(Sweden) Per Nyman
2	15 Aug 1993	Compaq Open	−9 (72-66-70-67=275)	3 strokes	(Sweden) Vilhelm Forsbrand
3	5 Sep 1993	Open Dijon Bourgogne	−10 (74-68-70-66=278)	6 strokes	(Sweden) Fredrik Andersson
4	11 Sep 1999	Daewoo Warsaw Golf Open	−4 (73-73-67-67=280)	1 stroke	(South Africa) Hennie Otto

== Results in major championships ==
Tournament	2001	2002	2003	2004	2005	2006	2007	2008	2009	2010	2011	2012	2013	2014
Masters Tournament		CUT	CUT				T55	T39						
U.S. Open		T37	T48			CUT	4	CUT						CUT
The Open Championship	2	T28	CUT			CUT	T35	CUT					CUT	
PGA Championship	T29	CUT	T10	T45	CUT	CUT	T42	T63						

Top 10
Did not play

CUT = missed the half-way cut
"T" indicates a tie for a place

=== Summary ===
Tournament	Wins	2nd	3rd	Top-5	Top-10	Top-25	Events	Cuts made
Masters Tournament	0	0	0	0	0	0	4	2
U.S. Open	0	0	0	1	1	1	6	3
The Open Championship	0	1	0	1	1	1	7	3
PGA Championship	0	0	0	0	1	1	8	5
Totals	0	1	0	2	3	3	25	13

- Most consecutive cuts made – 5 (2007 Masters – 2008 Masters)
- Longest streak of top-10s – 1 (three times)

== Results in The Players Championship ==
Tournament	2002	2003	2004	2005	2006	2007	2008
The Players Championship	CUT	T21				CUT	CUT

Did not play

CUT = missed the halfway cut
"T" indicates a tie for a place

== Results in World Golf Championships ==
Tournament	2001	2002	2003	2004	2005	2006	2007	2008
Match Play		R16	R32	R64		R64	R16	R32
Championship	NT^{1}	T11	T16		T37		T6	T44
Invitational	T21	T58	T58	T61	T33		T22	T52

^{1}Cancelled due to 9/11

Top 10
Did not play

QF, R16, R32, R64 = Round in which player lost in match play
"T" = tied
NT = No tournament held.

== Team appearances ==
Amateur

- European Boys' Team Championship (representing Sweden): 1990
- European Amateur Team Championship (representing Sweden): 1991
- European Youths' Team Championship (representing Sweden): 1992 (winners)
- EGA Trophy (representing the Continent of Europe): 1992 (winners)
- St Andrews Trophy (representing the Continent of Europe): 1992
- Eisenhower Trophy (representing Sweden): 1992

Professional

- WGC-World Cup (representing Sweden): 2001, 2002, 2003, 2005
- Ryder Cup (representing Europe): 2002 (winners)
- Seve Trophy (representing Continental Europe): 2002, 2003, 2005
- Royal Trophy (representing Europe): 2007 (winners), 2009

== See also ==
- 1997 PGA Tour Qualifying School graduates
- List of golfers with most Challenge Tour wins
