= European Youths' Team Championship =

European amateur team golf championship

The European Youths' Team Championship was a European amateur team golf championship for men under 22 organized by the European Golf Association. The inaugural event was held in 1961. It was played every year until 1982, then every second year. It was discontinued in 2006.

== Results ==
Year	Venue	Location	Winners	Runners-up
2006	La Canada	Spain	Spain	Italy
2004	The Island GC	Ireland	Scotland	England
2002	Gdansk G&CC	Poland	Sweden	England
2000	Kilmarnock (Barassie) GC	Scotland	England	Scotland
1998	Royal Waterloo GC	Belgium	Wales	Sweden
1996	Madeira GC	Portugal	Scotland	Spain
1994	Esbjerg GC	Denmark	Ireland	Sweden
1992	Helsinki	Finland	Sweden	England
1990	I Roveri GC	Italy	Italy	Sweden
1984	Hermitage	Ireland	Ireland	Denmark
1982	Racing Club de France	France	Scotland	Italy
1981	Reykjavik	Iceland	Spain	Ireland
1980	Düsseldorf	Germany	Sweden	Italy
1979	Marianske Lazne	Czech Republic	Ireland	Denmark
1978	Pals GC	Spain	France	Spain
1977	Oslo	Norway	Ireland	France
1976	Murhof	Austria	Sweden	Italy
1975	Geneva	Switzerland	Italy	Sweden
1974	Helsinki	Finland	France	Sweden
1973	Silkeborg	Denmark	France	Sweden
1972	Eindhoven	Netherlands	Switzerland	Sweden
1971	St Cloud	France	France	Germany
1970	Grand-Ducal	Luxembourg	Sweden	Denmark
1969	Penina	Portugal	Sweden	Switzerland
1968	Ryl Waterloo	Belgium	France	Netherlands
1967	Jonkoping	Sweden	Spain	France
1966	Kennemer	Netherlands	Denmark	Germany
1965	Lido	Italy	France	Sweden
1964	St Cloud	France	France	Germany
1963	Oslo	Norway	Sweden	France
1962	Krefeld	Germany	Germany	Sweden
1961	La Galea	Spain	Germany	Spain

== Results summary ==
Country	Winner	Runner-up
Sweden	7	9
France	7	3
Ireland	4	1
Spain	3	3
Scotland	3	1
Italy	2	4
Germany	2	3
Denmark	1	3
England	1	3
Switzerland	1	1
Wales	1	–
Netherlands	–	1
Total	32	32

== Winning teams ==
- 2006: Spain: Jordi García del Moral, Jorge Campillo, Nacho Elvira, Marc Perez, Pedro Oriol, Ion Garcia Avis
- 2004: Scotland: Wallace Booth, Scott Jamieson, Kevin McAlpine, George Murray, Richie Ramsay, Lloyd Saltman
- 2002: Sweden: Mikael Detterberg, Kalle Edberg, Lars Johansson, Pär Nilsson, Alex Norén, Mats Pilö
- 2000: England: Jamie Elson, David Griffiths, Richard McEvoy, Phil Rowe, Zane Scotland, Tom Whitehouse
- 1998: Wales: Neil Mattews, Morgan Palmer, Mark Pilkington, Oliver Pughe, Alex Smith, Craig Williams
- 1996: Scotland: Roger Beames, Grant Campbell, Alastair Forsyth, Euan Little, David Patrick, Steven Young
- 1994: Ireland: Eamonn Bradley, Richie Coughlan, Peter Lawrie, Andrew McGormick, Stephen Moloney, Keith Nolan
- 1992: Sweden: Max Anglert, Fredrik Andersson, Niclas Fasth, Mikael Lundberg, Peter Malmgren, Rikard Strångert
- 1990: Italien: Emanuele Canonica, Massimo Florioli, Marco Gortana, Michele Reale, Massimo Scarpa, Mario Tadini
- 1984: Ireland: Jim Carvill, Jason Farrell, John McHenry, John Morris, Paul Murphy, Eoghan O'Connell
- 1982: Scotland: George Barrie, Colin Dalgleish, Linsey Mann, Colin Montgomerie, Alex Pickles, Ian Young
- 1981: Spain: Alfonso Vidaor, José Ignacio Márquez, Julian Mayoral, Jesus Lopez, Alejo Ollé, Joaquín Assens
- 1980: Sweden: Torbjörn Antevik, Freddy Carlsson, Anders Forsbrand, Claes Grönberg, Per Jönsson, Göran Knutsson
- 1979: Ireland: J. Collins, T. Corridan, Hanna, Brendan McDaid, Ronan Rafferty, Philip Walton
- 1978: France: Marc Farry, Michel Gayon, J.I. Mouhica, F. Perreau, Tim Planchin, François Illouz
- 1977: Ireland: Paddy O'Boyle, Sean Flanagan, Brendan McDaid, Peter O'Hagan, D.P. O'Connor, T. Corridan
- 1976: Sweden: Per Andersson, Jan Andhagen, Hans Ivarsson, Anders Johnsson, Per-Göran Nilsson, Fredrik Stahle
- 1975: Italy: Alberto Avanzo, Stefano Betti, Stefano Esente, Antonio Lionello, Massimo Manelli, Giuseppe Sita
- 1974: France: Sven Boinet, Ph. Caillol, Patrick Cotton, Tim Planchin, Philippe Ploujoux, Gary Watine
- 1973: France: Sven Boinet, G. Bourdy, Patrick Cotton, René Darrieumerlou, Michel Tapia, Philippe Ploujoux
- 1972: Switzerland: J. Duc, Thomas Fortmann, Yves Hofstetter, Martin Kessler, René Kessler, Peter Müller
- 1971: France:
- 1970: Sweden: Dag Aurell, Olle Dahlgren, Staffan Mannerström, Christer Nilsson, Jan Rube, Michael Örtegren
- 1969: Sweden: Olle Dahlgren, Rikard Hansson, Staffan Mannerström, Gunnar Mueller, Christer Nilsson, Michael Örtegren
- 1968: France: Fr. Blanchard, O. Brizon, J. Desbordes, Hervé Frayssineau, George Leven, Fr. Thevenin-Lemoine
- 1967: Spain: J. Catarineau, José Luis Noguer, Nicasio Sagardia, Román Tayá, Javier Viladomiu, Santiago Fisas Jr.
- 1966: Denmark: Kjeld Friche, Per Greve-Jensen, Henry J. Jacobsen, Klaus Hove, Henning Knudsen, Hans Stenderup
- 1965: France: Hervé Frayssineau
- 1964: France: O. Brizon, Didier Charmat, Patrick Cros, Hervé Frayssineau, Alexis Godillot, Saubaber, Fr. Thevenin-Lemoine, Watine
- 1963: Sweden: Claes-Mårten Boive, Hans Hedjerson, Johan Jöhncke, Mats Kristersson, Tony Lidholm, Lars Peil, Christer Peil, Peter Sundgren
- 1962: Germany: Knut Berlage, P. von Elten, Hans-Hubert Giesen, Freidrich-Carl Janssen, Peter Jochums, Henning Sostmann, Jürgen Weghmann, Nils Wirichs
- 1961: Germany: Knut Berlage, Hans-Hubert Giesen, Freidrich-Carl Jansen, Peter Jochums, Helge Rademacher, Henning Sostmann, Jürgen Weghmann

== See also ==
- European Boys' Team Championship – amateur team golf championship for men under 18 organized by the European Golf Association.
- European Lady Junior's Team Championship – discontinued amateur team golf championship played 1968–1984 for women under 22 organized by the European Golf Association.
