= Fredrik Andersson Hed =

Swedish golfer and commentator (1972–2021)

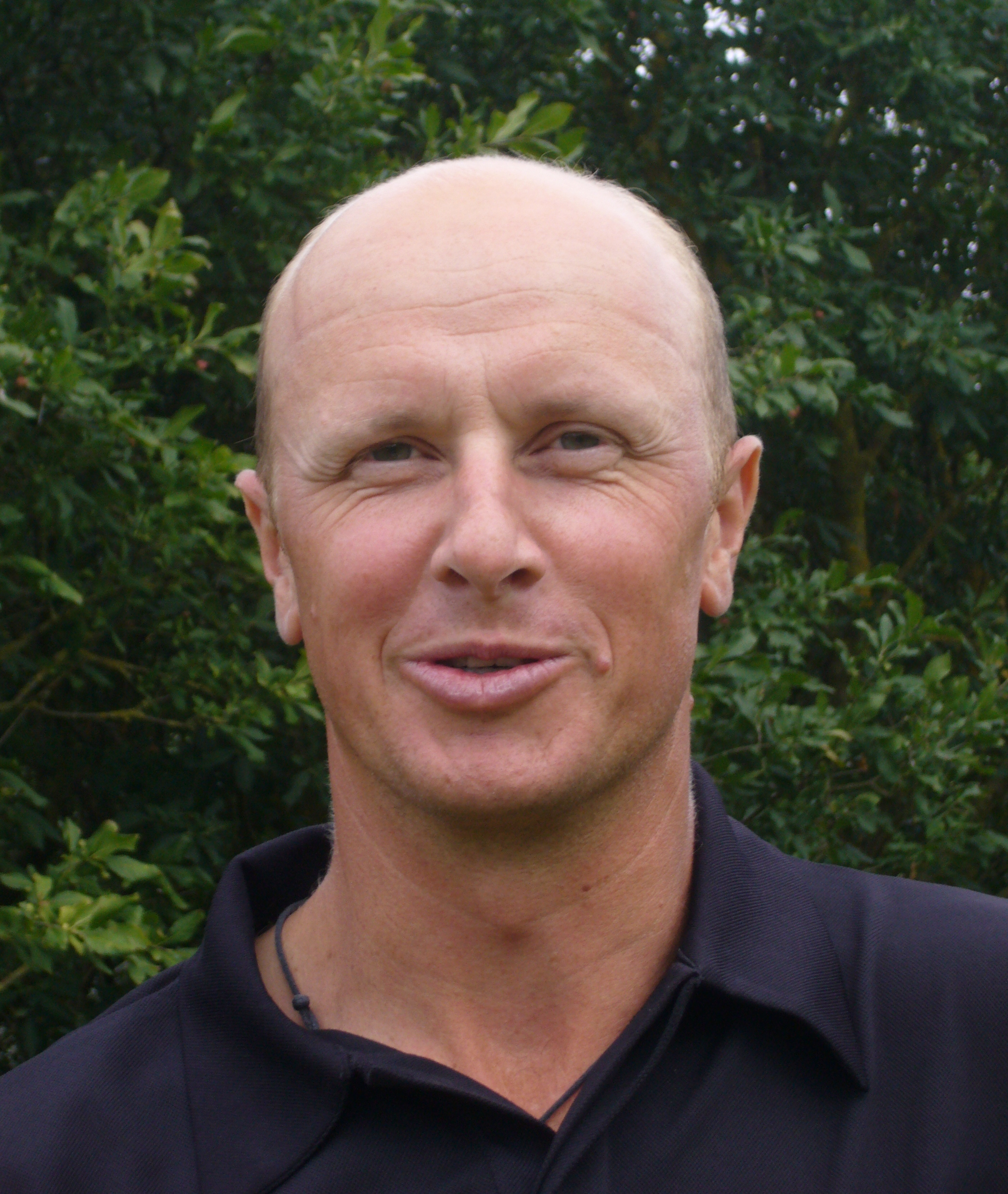
- Andersson Hed in 2009

Personal information
- Nationality: Sweden
- Born: 20 January 1972 Halmstad, Sweden
- Died: 24 October 2021 (aged 49) Halmstad, Sweden
- Height: 1.88 m (6 ft 2 in)
- Spouse: Anna Hed (m. 2004)
- Children: 2

Career
- Sport: Golf
- Turned professional: 1992
- Former tours: European Tour; Challenge Tour; Swedish Golf Tour
- Professional wins: 3
- Highest ranking: 68 (7 November 2010)

Number of wins by tour
- European Tour: 1
- Challenge Tour: 2

Best results in major championships
- Masters Tournament: DNP
- PGA Championship: T62: 2010
- U.S. Open: DNP
- The Open Championship: T50: 2002

Fredrik Andersson Hed (Swedish pronunciation: [ˈfrěːdrɪk ˈânːdɛˌʂɔn ˈheːd]; 20 January 1972 – 24 October 2021) was a Swedish professional golfer and broadcaster. He won the 2010 BMW Italian Open.

== Early life ==
Andersson Hed was born in Halmstad on 20 January 1972. He began playing golf when he was ten years old and turned professional in 1992.

== Professional career ==
Andersson Hed won his first title on the Challenge Tour only a year after turning pro at the inaugural Danish PGA Championship. He later won the Challenge de France held in Le Touquet in 2003. However, he found success hard to come by on the main European Tour, where he had to return to qualifying school on numerous occasions.

Andersson Hed won his first European Tour title at the 2010 BMW Italian Open at Royal Park, outside Turin, on his 245th attempt. Two weeks later, he finished tied in second place, with Luke Donald, at the European Tour's flagship event, the 2010 BMW PGA Championship at Wentworth Club. He finished one shot behind winner Simon Khan. 2010 was ultimately his best year on the European Tour, when he finished 22nd on the Order of Merit.

Andersson Hed was also runner-up another five times on the European Tour, at the 2003 Madeira Island Open, 2007 Valle Romano Open de Andalucia, 2011 Barclays Scottish Open, 2012 UBS Hong Kong Open and 2012 Omega European Masters. He missed the cut at the European Tour Qualifying School in November 2015 by one stroke, and subsequently retired from professional golf. He became a golf commentator for the national public broadcaster Sveriges Television the following year.

== Personal life ==
Andersson Hed married Anna Hed in 2004, and consequently added her surname to his name. He had been known as Fredrik Andersson until then. Together, they had two children; Viggo and Molly.

Andersson Hed died on 24 October 2021, with his death being announced by the European Tour. He was 49, and suffered from cancer prior to his death.

== Amateur wins ==
- 1990 Swedish Junior Stroke-play Championship
- 1990 European Young Masters

== Professional wins (3) ==
=== European Tour wins (1) ===
No.	Date	Tournament	Winning score	Margin of victory	Runner-up
1	9 May 2010	BMW Italian Open	−16 (70-66-63-73=272)	2 strokes	(England) David Horsey

=== Challenge Tour wins (2) ===
No.	Date	Tournament	Winning score	Margin of victory	Runner-up
1	8 August 1993	Toyota Danish PGA Championship	−6 (67-71-69=207)	2 strokes	(Sweden) Rikard Strångert (a)
2	15 October 2000	Le Touquet Challenge de France	−11 (71-68-68-70=277)	Playoff	(Spain) Carlos Rodiles

Challenge Tour playoff record (1–0)

No.	Year	Tournament	Opponent	Result
1	2000	Le Touquet Challenge de France	(Spain) Carlos Rodiles	Won with par on second extra hole

== Results in major championships ==
Tournament	1995	1996	1997	1998	1999
The Open Championship	CUT				
PGA Championship					

Tournament	2000	2001	2002	2003	2004	2005	2006	2007	2008	2009
The Open Championship			T50					T69		T65
PGA Championship										

Tournament	2010	2011
The Open Championship	T68	T57
PGA Championship	T62	CUT

Did not play

CUT = missed the half-way cut
"T" = tied
Note: Andersson Hed never played in the Masters Tournament or the U.S. Open.

== Team appearances ==
Amateur

- European Amateur Team Championship (representing Sweden): 1991
- European Youths' Team Championship (representing Sweden): 1992 (winners)
- Eisenhower Trophy (representing Sweden): 1992
- St Andrews Trophy (representing the Continent of Europe): 1992

Professional

- Royal Trophy (representing Europe): 2011 (winners)

== See also ==
- 2006 European Tour Qualifying School graduates
- 2009 European Tour Qualifying School graduates
