= Martin Wiegele =

Austrian professional golfer (born 1978)

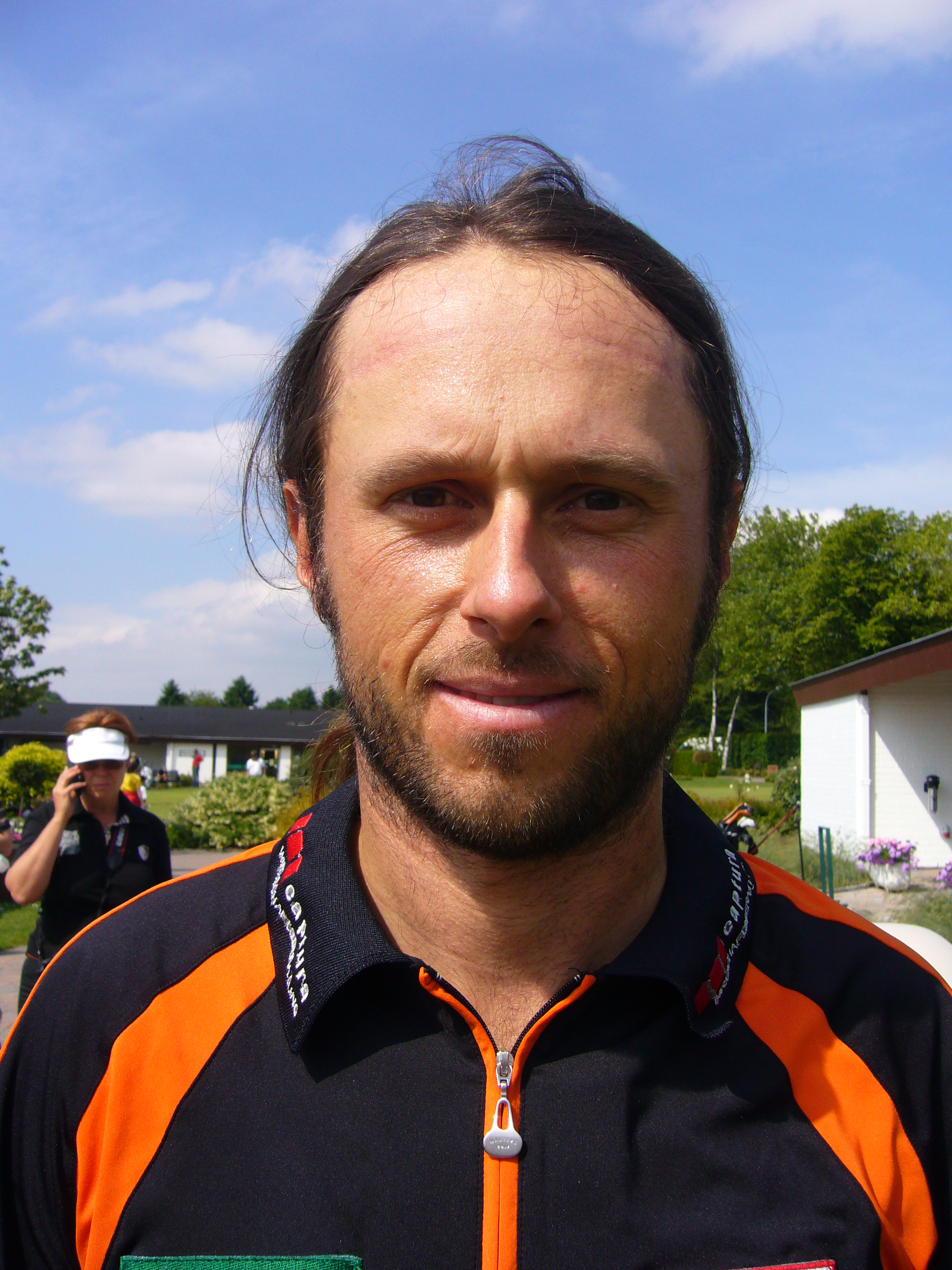

Personal information
- Nationality: Austria
- Born: 11 July 1978 (age 48) Graz, Austria
- Height: 1.82 m (6 ft 0 in)
- Spouse: Claudia Wiegele

Career
- Sport: Golf
- Turned professional: 2003
- Current tour: Challenge Tour
- Former tour: European Tour
- Professional wins: 5

Number of wins by tour
- European Tour: 1
- Challenge Tour: 4

Best results in major championships
- Masters Tournament: DNP
- PGA Championship: DNP
- U.S. Open: DNP
- The Open Championship: T70: 2008

Martin Wiegele (born 11 July 1978) is an Austrian professional golfer.

== Career ==
Wiegele was born in Graz. He turned professional in 2003 when he joined the second tier Challenge Tour. He enjoyed some success during his first season finishing fourth on the end of season rankings to graduate to the top level European Tour for 2004. He almost won his first European Tour event he ever played, losing a playoff against Marcus Fraser in the 2003 BMW Russian Open. He could not keep his European Tour card and had to go back to the Challenge Tour. He struggled for form during the next few seasons due to massive swing changes, before picking up his first big victory at the 2007 Lexus Open. He went on to be medalist at the European Tour Qualifying School at the end of the season to regain his place at the top level.

Having finished 142nd on the Order of Merit in 2008, Wiegele returned to the Challenge Tour in 2009. He picked up his second tournament victory on the Challenge Tour in 2010 at the Kärnten Golf Open, before winning his first European Tour title at the Saint-Omer Open two weeks later which gave him a one-year exemption on the main tour. He gained his Tour card for the 2012 season by finishing 83rd in the 2011 Race to Dubai, a season in which he finished tied for third in the Barclays Scottish Open.

Wiegele missed most of the 2012 season because of two hip surgeries, and lost his full playing rights on the European Tour after his 2013 season. Hip problems and poor form since has kept him outside the world top-1000 most of the time from 2013 to early 2017. In June 2017, he was a surprise winner of the KPMG Trophy, his best performance since 2011.

Because of his ongoing hip injury, he received a total hip replacement in early 2018.

== Amateur wins ==
- 1997 Austrian Amateur Closed Championship
- 2000 Austrian Amateur Closed Championship
- 2001 Austrian Amateur Closed Championship
- 2002 Slovak Amateur Open Championships, Austrian Amateur Closed Championship

== Professional wins (5) ==
=== European Tour wins (1) ===
No.	Date	Tournament	Winning score	Margin of victory	Runners-up
1	20 Jun 2010	Saint-Omer Open^{1}	−7 (66-71-72-68=277)	2 strokes	(England) Robert Dinwiddie, (Sweden) Pelle Edberg, (England) Jamie Elson, (England) Matt Haines, (France) Raphaël Jacquelin

^{1}Dual-ranking event with the Challenge Tour

European Tour playoff record (0–1)

No.	Year	Tournament	Opponent	Result
1	2003	BMW Russian Open	(Australia) Marcus Fraser	Lost to par on second extra hole

=== Challenge Tour wins (4) ===
No.	Date	Tournament	Winning score	Margin of victory	Runner(s)-up
1	19 Aug 2007	Lexus Open	−10 (68-71-73-66=278)	Playoff	(Scotland) George Murray
2	6 Jun 2010	Kärnten Golf Open	−13 (62-76-71-66=275)	1 stroke	(Netherlands) Floris de Vries, (England) Daniel Denison, (Australia) Matthew Zions
3	20 Jun 2010	Saint-Omer Open^{1}	−7 (66-71-72-68=277)	2 strokes	(England) Robert Dinwiddie, (Sweden) Pelle Edberg, (England) Jamie Elson, (England) Matt Haines, (France) Raphaël Jacquelin
4	11 Jun 2017	KPMG Trophy	−19 (68-69-66-66=269)	1 stroke	(Spain) Pedro Oriol

^{1}Dual-ranking event with the European Tour

Challenge Tour playoff record (1–1)

No.	Year	Tournament	Opponent	Result
1	2003	BMW Russian Open	(Australia) Marcus Fraser	Lost to par on second extra hole
2	2007	Lexus Open	(Scotland) George Murray	Won with par on first extra hole

=== Alps Tour wins (1) ===
No.	Date	Tournament	Winning score	Margin of victory	Runners-up
1	4 May 2008	Gösser Open	−12 (71-67-66=204)	Playoff	(Italy) Emanuele Lattanzi, (Italy) Andrea Rota

== Results in major championships ==
Tournament	2008
Masters Tournament	
U.S. Open	
The Open Championship	T70
PGA Championship	

Did not play

CUT = missed the half-way cut
"T" = tied

== Team appearances ==
Amateur

- European Boys' Team Championship (representing Austria): 1995, 1996
- European Amateur Team Championship (representing Austria): 1997, 1999, 2001
- European Youths' Team Championship (representing Austria): 1998
- Eisenhower Trophy (representing Austria): 2000, 2002
- Bonallack Trophy (representing Europe): 2002
- St Andrews Trophy (representing the Continent of Europe): 2002

Professional

- World Cup (representing Austria): 2004, 2016
- Ponte Veccio Challenge: 2011

== See also ==
- 2007 European Tour Qualifying School graduates
- List of golfers with most Challenge Tour wins
