= Kärnten Golf Open =

Golf tournament in Austria

Tournament information
- Location: Gödersdorf, Austria
- Established: 2009
- Course: Golfclub Schloss Finkenstein
- Par: 71
- Length: 6,932 yards (6,339 m)
- Tour: Challenge Tour
- Format: Stroke play
- Prize fund: €180,000
- Month played: May
- Final year: 2015

Tournament record score
- Aggregate: 263 Nacho Elvira (2015)
- To par: −23 Édouard Dubois (2011)

Final champion
- (Spain) Nacho Elvira
- Location in Austria

The Kärnten Golf Open was a golf tournament on the Challenge Tour, played in Austria. It was held for the first time in 2009. It was contested over the Pete Dye designed course at the Golf Club Klagenfurt-Seltenheim in Klagenfurt from 2009 to 2012. In 2013 it moved to Jacques Lemans Golf Club in Sankt Georgen am Längsee. In 2014 it moved to the Golfclub Schloss Finkenstein in Gödersdorf.

The tournament was presented by European Tour player, and Austria's top ranked professional golfer at the time, Markus Brier, who also played in the inaugural event to promote golf in the country and his charitable foundation.

== Winners ==
Year	Winner	Score	To par	Margin of victory	Runner(s)-up	Venue	Ref.
2015	(Spain) Nacho Elvira	263	−21	1 stroke	(Sweden) Jens Dantorp	Schloss Finkenstein	
2014	(Germany) Moritz Lampert	265	−19	1 stroke	(South Korea) An Byeong-hun	Schloss Finkenstein	
2013	(South Africa) Dylan Frittelli	267	−17	3 strokes	(Italy) Filippo Bergamaschi (Netherlands) Daan Huizing	Jacques Lemans	
2012	(France) Gary Stal	268	−20	1 stroke	(England) Daniel Brooks	Klagenfurt-Seltenheim	
2011	(France) Édouard Dubois	265	−23	4 strokes	(Italy) Andrea Pavan	Klagenfurt-Seltenheim	
2010	(Austria) Martin Wiegele	275	−13	1 stoke	(Netherlands) Floris de Vries (England) Daniel Denison (Australia) Matthew Zions	Klagenfurt-Seltenheim	
2009	(Germany) Christoph Günther	268	−20	1 stroke	(Germany) Florian Fritsch (Spain) Carlos Rodiles	Klagenfurt-Seltenheim	
