= Mark Tullo =

Chilean professional golfer (born 1978

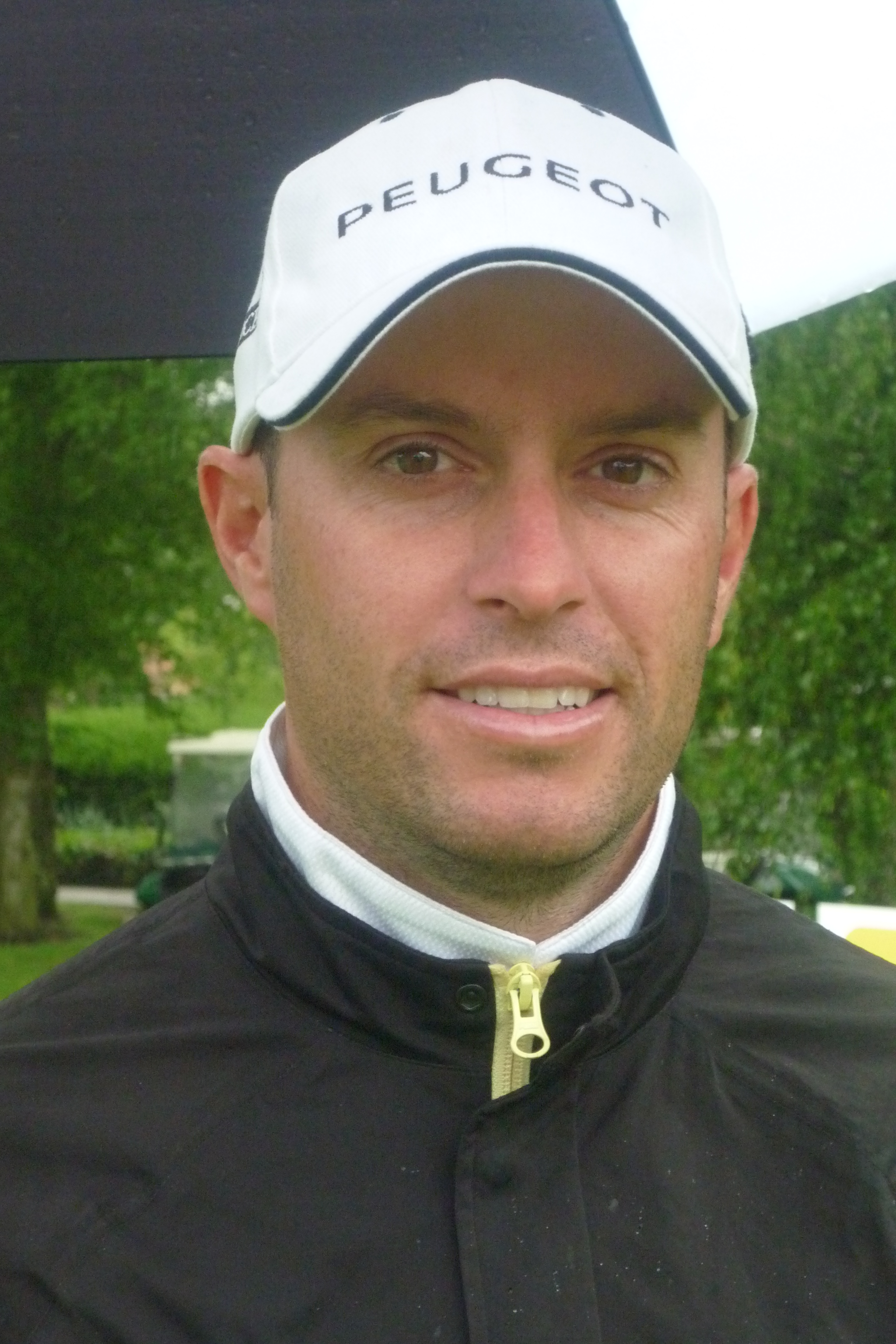

Personal information
- Full name: Mark Tullo
- Nationality: Chile
- Born: 9 February 1978 (age 48) Santiago, Chile
- Height: 1.70 m (5 ft 7 in)
- Weight: 68 kg (150 lb; 10.7 st)

Career
- Sport: Golf
- College: North Carolina State University
- Turned professional: 2003
- Former tours: European Tour; Challenge Tour; Chilean Tour
- Professional wins: 11

Number of wins by tour
- Challenge Tour: 3
- Other: 8

Achievements and awards
- Chilean Tour Order of Merit winner: 2005, 2006, 2007

Mark Tullo (born 9 February 1978) is a Chilean professional golfer.

== Early life and amateur career ==
Tullo was born in Santiago. He attended North Carolina State University in the United States on a golf scholarship, graduating with a degree in business management.

== Professional career ==
In 2003, Tullo turned professional. He has entered the European Tour's qualifying school five times, only making it through to the final stage once, in 2009. He has competed on the second tier Challenge Tour since 2007, and won for the first time in August 2010 at the Rolex Trophy, where he edged out Matteo Manassero by a single stroke. He ended the 2010 season inside the top ten on the final Challenge Tour Rankings to graduate to the elite European Tour for 2011.

Tullo has also won many tournaments in Chile, including the Chile Open on two occasions, and topped the order of merit three times, in 2005, 2006 and 2007.

== Professional wins (11) ==
=== Challenge Tour wins (3) ===
No.	Date	Tournament	Winning score	Margin of victory	Runner(s)-up
1	14 Aug 2010	Rolex Trophy	−22 (69-66-66-65=266)	1 stroke	(Italy) Matteo Manassero
2	23 Oct 2010	Egyptian Open	−13 (71-68-70-66=275)	1 stroke	(Netherlands) Floris de Vries, (Scotland) George Murray
3	17 Aug 2014	Vacon Open	−20 (68-67-65-64=264)	3 strokes	(Sweden) Pelle Edberg

=== Chilean Tour wins (6) ===
No.	Date	Tournament	Winning score	Margin of victory	Runner-up
1	13 Jan 2018	Abierto Marbella	−26 (65-67-62-68=262)	4 strokes	(Argentina) Julio Zapata
2	1 Apr 2018	Campeonato de Chile	3 and 2		(Chile) Christian Espinoza
3	28 Oct 2018	Abierto Prince of Wales Country Club	−16 (67-68-65=200)	10 strokes	(Chile) Gustavo Silva
4	8 Dec 2018	Abierto del Sport Francés	−9 (68-69-70=207)	3 strokes	(Chile) Philippe Guidi
5	10 Feb 2019	Abierto Brisas de Santo Domingo	−9 (70-68-68-73=279)	1 stroke	(Chile) Cristóbal del Solar
6	21 Dec 2025	Scotiabank Abierto de Chile	−10 (70-74-68-66=278)	1 stroke	(Chile) Gustavo Silva

=== Other wins (2) ===
- 2005 Chile Open
- 2006 Chile Open

== Team appearances ==
Amateur

- Eisenhower Trophy (representing Chile): 2002

Professional

- World Cup (representing Chile): 2008, 2013

== See also ==
- 2010 Challenge Tour graduates
- 2012 Challenge Tour graduates
- 2014 Challenge Tour graduates
