= 2010 Challenge Tour graduates =

This is a list of players who graduated from the Challenge Tour in 2010. The top 20 players on the Challenge Tour's money list in 2010 earned their European Tour card for 2011.

	2010 Challenge Tour		2011 European Tour				
Player	Money list rank	Earnings (€)	Starts	Cuts made	Best finish	Money list rank	Earnings (€)
(Spain) Álvaro Velasco	1	134,297	30	14	T4	127	206,170
(England) Matt Haines*	2	107,152	35	8	T18	175	88,800
(Denmark) Thorbjørn Olesen*	3	104,754	30	12	T2	48	637,703
(Netherlands) Floris de Vries*	4	101,288	23	9	T13	171	99,108
(Austria) Bernd Wiesberger	5	99,989	33	19	T2	64	469,499
(Sweden) Oscar Florén*	6	98,948	27	13	T5	111	264,783
(Australia) Daniel Gaunt	7	97,521	33	15	T15	142	167,053
(England) Robert Dinwiddie	8	95,650	30	14	T6	141	170,707
(Chile) Mark Tullo*	9	92,583	28	11	T3	119	250,806
(Scotland) George Murray*	10	92,339	28	14	T3	81	386,710
(Argentina) Julio Zapata	11	86,961	25	9	T39	213	39,559
(Sweden) Joel Sjöholm*	12	83,907	30	16	T3	107	280,311
(England) Lee Slattery	13	78,358	31	17	Win	82	380,087
(Scotland) Scott Jamieson*	14	67,413	31	13	T3	59	523,754
(Australia) Matthew Zions	15	63,176	33	11	Win	124	218,452
(Norway) Marius Thorp*	16	63,127	8	3	T21	n/a	19,475
(Italy) Lorenzo Gagli	17	62,545	25	21	2	49	622,846
(Sweden) Magnus A. Carlsson	18	60,469	23	11	T7	134	193,636
(Scotland) Raymond Russell	19	59,376	2	1	T70	n/a	1,900
(France) Alexandre Kaleka*	20	58,888	27	10	T5	159	128,735

* European Tour rookie in 2011
T = Tied
The player retained his European Tour card for 2012 (finished inside the top 118, or won).
The player did not retain his European Tour Tour card for 2012, but retained conditional status (finished between 119 and 150).
The player did not retain his European Tour card for 2012 (finished outside the top 150).

The players ranked 16th through 20th were placed below the Qualifying School graduates on the exemption list, and thus could improve their status by competing in Qualifying School. Alexandre Kaleka improved his status in this way.

== Winner on the European Tour in 2011 ==
No.	Date	Player	Tournament	Winning score	Margin of victory	Runner(s)-up
1	19 Jun	(Australia) Matthew Zions	Saint-Omer Open	−8 (68-72-67-69=276)	7 strokes	(England) Daniel Denison, (Sweden) Peter Gustafsson
2	9 Oct	(England) Lee Slattery	Bankia Madrid Masters	−15 (67-66-69-71=273)	1 stroke	(Italy) Lorenzo Gagli

== Runners-up on the European Tour in 2011 ==
No.	Date	Player	Tournament	Winner	Winning score	Runner-up score
1	12 Dec 2010	(Denmark) Thorbjørn Olesen	Alfred Dunhill Championship	(Spain) Pablo Martín	−11 (69-70-68-70=277)	−9 (71-68-74-66=279)
2	12 Jun	(Denmark) Thorbjørn Olesen (2)	BMW Italian Open	(England) Robert Rock	−21 (64-68-68-67=267)	−20 (65-71-70-62=268)
3	3 Jul	(Denmark) Thorbjørn Olesen (3)	Alstom Open de France	(France) Thomas Levet	−7 (70-70-67-70=277)	−6 (66-71-71-70=278)
4	28 Aug	(Austria) Bernd Wiesberger lost in five-man playoff	Johnnie Walker Championship at Gleneagles	(Denmark) Thomas Bjørn	−11 (68-69-71-69=277)	−11 (69-71-68-69=277)
5	9 Oct	(Italy) Lorenzo Gagli	Bankia Madrid Masters	(England) Lee Slattery	−15 (67-66-69-71=273)	−14 (65-70-69-70=274)
6	27 Nov	(Austria) Bernd Wiesberger (2)	South African Open Championship	(South Africa) Hennie Otto	−14 (70-67-65-72=274)	−13 (69-68-70-68=275)

== See also ==
- 2010 European Tour Qualifying School graduates
