= KPMG Trophy =

Tournament information
- Location: Paal, Belgium
- Established: 2006
- Course: Millennium Golf
- Par: 71
- Length: 6,797 yards (6,215 m)
- Tour: Challenge Tour
- Format: Stroke play
- Prize fund: €185,000
- Month played: August/September
- Final year: 2019

Tournament record score
- Aggregate: 261 Laurie Canter (2019); 261 Dale Whitnell (2019)
- To par: −23 as above

Final champion
- (England) Dale Whitnell
- Location in Belgium

The KPMG Trophy is a golf tournament on the Challenge Tour, played in Belgium. It was first played in May 2006 as the Telenet Trophy at Limburg G&CC in Houthalen-Helchteren, and has rotated through several other venues throughout its history.

== Winners ==
Year	Winner	Score	To par	Margin of victory	Runner(s)-up	Venue
KPMG Trophy
2019	(England) Dale Whitnell	261	−23	Playoff	(England) Laurie Canter	Millennium Golf
2018	(Portugal) Pedro Figueiredo	262	−22	Playoff	(Sweden) Anton Karlsson (Wales) Stuart Manley	Golf L'Empereur
2017	(Austria) Martin Wiegele	269	−19	1 stroke	(Spain) Pedro Oriol	Royal Waterloo
2016	(Sweden) Simon Forsström	264	−20	2 strokes	(England) Steven Tiley	Cleydael
2015	(Scotland) Jamie McLeary	275	−13	1 stroke	(Netherlands) Taco Remkes	Pierpont
Belgian Challenge Open
2014	(England) William Harrold	266	−18	Playoff	(Germany) Florian Fritsch	Cleydael
Telenet Trophy
2013	(Australia) Daniel Gaunt	273	−11	Playoff	(Netherlands) Wil Besseling	Royal Waterloo
2012	(Italy) Marco Crespi	270	−14	3 strokes	(Spain) Carlos Aguilar	Ravenstein
2011	(Australia) Andrew Tampion	280	−8	1 stroke	(England) Oliver Whiteley	Royal Waterloo
2010	(England) Lee Slattery	267	−21	4 strokes	(France) Édouard Dubois	Rinkven
2009	(France) François Calmels	276	−12	2 strokes	(Spain) Carlos Rodiles (England) Sam Walker	Royal Waterloo
2008	(England) David Horsey	269	−19	1 stroke	(Netherlands) Wil Besseling (Denmark) Søren Juul	Limburg
2007	(Belgium) Nicolas Vanhootegem	271	−17	4 strokes	(Chile) Felipe Aguilar	Royal Waterloo
2006	(Finland) Toni Karjalainen	274	−14	1 stroke	(Spain) Ivó Giner (England) Gary Lockerbie	Limburg
