= Saint-Omer Open =

Hauts de France – Pas de Calais Golf Open
Tournament information
- Location: Saint-Omer, France
- Established: 1997
- Course: Saint-Omer Golf Club
- Par: 71
- Length: 7,480 yards (6,840 m)
- Tours: European Tour; Challenge Tour; Alps Tour; MasterCard Tour; LET Access Series
- Format: Stroke play
- Prize fund: €40,000
- Month played: September

Tournament record score
- Aggregate: 269 Brett Rumford (2003)
- To par: −20 Sébastien Delagrange (2001)

Current champion
- (France) Alexandre Vandermoten (France) Lucie Malchirand

Location map
- Location in France Location in Hauts-de-France

The Saint-Omer Open is an annual men's professional golf tournament played at Saint-Omer Golf Club in Saint-Omer, France. The tournament was founded in 1997 and was part of the MasterCard Tour a year later, before taking its place on the Challenge Tour for the 2000 season.

In 2003 it also became an official money event on the European Tour, but since it was played during the same week as the U.S. Open (one of golf's four major championships), the tour's leading players were not available to play. It had the smallest purse available on the European Tour. It was removed from the European Tour schedule in 2014 but remained on the Challenge Tour.

In 2022, the event became part of the Alps Tour schedule.

== Winners ==
Year	Tour(s) (Note: ALP − Alps Tour; CHA − Challenge Tour; EUR − European Tour; LETAS − LET Access Series; MCT − MasterCard Tour.)	Winner	Score	To par	Margin of victory	Runner(s)-up
Hauts de France – Pas de Calais Golf Open
2026 (Note: Separate tournaments played for men and women.)	ALP	(France) Alexandre Vandermoten	204	−9	Playoff	(Republic of Ireland) Hugh Foley
2026	LETAS	(France) Lucie Malchirand	203	−13	5 strokes	(Switzerland) Natalie Armbrüster
2025	ALP	(France) Quentin Debove	139 (Note: Shortened to 36 holes due to weather.)	−3	1 stroke	(Republic of Ireland) Hugh Foley
2025	LETAS	(Mexico) Fernanda Lira	138	−6	Playoff	(Iceland) Ragga Kristinsdóttir
2024	ALP	(Spain) Mario Galiano	138	−4	2 strokes	(France) Nicolas Aparicio (Spain) Álvaro Hernández Cabezuela (France) Benjamin Kédochim (United States) Brandon Kewalramani (France) Aaron van Hauwe
2024	LETAS	(Australia) Kelsey Bennett	140	−4	Playoff	(Switzerland) Anaïs Maggetti (England) Billie-Jo Smith
2023	ALP	(Republic of Ireland) Ronan Mullarney	197	−16	9 strokes	(Italy) Enrico Di Nitto (Italy) Manfredi Manica
2023	LETAS	(South Africa) Leján Lewthwaite	208	−11	Playoff	(Slovenia) Katja Pogačar
2022	ALP	(Netherlands) Davey Porsius	209	−4	1 stroke	(Italy) Gregorio De Leo
2022	LETAS	(New Zealand) Momoka Kobori	211	−8	4 strokes	(Netherlands) Lauren Holmey (a) (Spain) Noemí Jiménez
2021		Cancelled due to the COVID-19 pandemic				
2020	CHA	Cancelled due to the COVID-19 pandemic				
2019	CHA	(France) Robin Roussel	271	−13	2 strokes	(England) Richard Bland
Hauts de France Golf Open
2018	CHA	(Wales) Stuart Manley	278	−6	Playoff	(Scotland) Grant Forrest
2017	CHA	(France) Julien Guerrier	277	−7	1 stroke	(Scotland) Jack Doherty (Italy) Lorenzo Gagli (Portugal) Ricardo Santos
Najeti Open
2016	CHA	(Portugal) José-Filipe Lima (Note: Lima is a dual citizen of France and Portugal. Until the end of 2004, he represented France and used the French form of his name.) (2)	275	−9	2 strokes	(Belgium) Thomas Detry (Italy) Alessandro Tadini
2015	CHA	(France) Sébastien Gros	270	−14	6 strokes	(France) Thomas Linard
Najeti Hotels et Golfs Open
2014	CHA	(Spain) Jordi García Pinto	277	−7	3 strokes	(Spain) Carlos Aguilar
2013	CHA, EUR	(Republic of Ireland) Simon Thornton	279	−5	Playoff	(South Africa) Tjaart van der Walt
Saint-Omer Open
2012	CHA, EUR	(South Africa) Darren Fichardt	279	−5	3 strokes	(England) Gary Lockerbie
2011	CHA, EUR	(Australia) Matthew Zions	276	−8	7 strokes	(England) Daniel Denison (Sweden) Peter Gustafsson (Scotland) Craig Lee
2010	CHA, EUR	(Austria) Martin Wiegele	277	−7	2 strokes	(England) Robert Dinwiddie (Sweden) Pelle Edberg (England) Jamie Elson (England) Matt Haines (France) Raphaël Jacquelin
2009	CHA, EUR	(Sweden) Christian Nilsson	271	−13	6 strokes	(Portugal) José-Filipe Lima
2008	CHA, EUR	(England) David Dixon	279	−5	1 stroke	(Sweden) Christian Nilsson
Open de Saint-Omer
2007	CHA, EUR	(Spain) Carl Suneson	276	−8	3 strokes	(France) François Calmels (Australia) Peter Fowler (England) Marcus Higley
Aa St Omer Open
2006	CHA, EUR	(Argentina) César Monasterio	274	−10	1 stroke	(South Africa) Martin Maritz (Sweden) Henrik Nyström
2005	CHA, EUR	(Sweden) Joakim Bäckström	280	−4	Playoff	(England) Paul Dwyer
2004	CHA, EUR	(France) Philippe Lima	279	−5	1 stroke	(Italy) Alessandro Tadini
2003	CHA, EUR	(Australia) Brett Rumford	269	−15	5 strokes	(England) Ben Mason
2002	CHA	(Belgium) Nicolas Vanhootegem	277	−7	4 strokes	(England) Lee S. James (Argentina) Gustavo Rojas
2001	CHA	(France) Sébastien Delagrange	272	−20	1 stroke	(Wales) Jamie Donaldson
2000	CHA	(France) Pascal Edmond	274	−18	1 stroke	(France) Franck Aumonier
St Omer Open
1999	MCT	(Scotland) Alastair Forsyth	279	−13	1 stroke	(France) Anthony Grenier
1998	MCT	(England) Shaun P. Webster				
1997	MCT	(France) Cédric Hoffstetter				
