= Ricardo Santos (golfer) =

Portuguese golfer (born 1982)

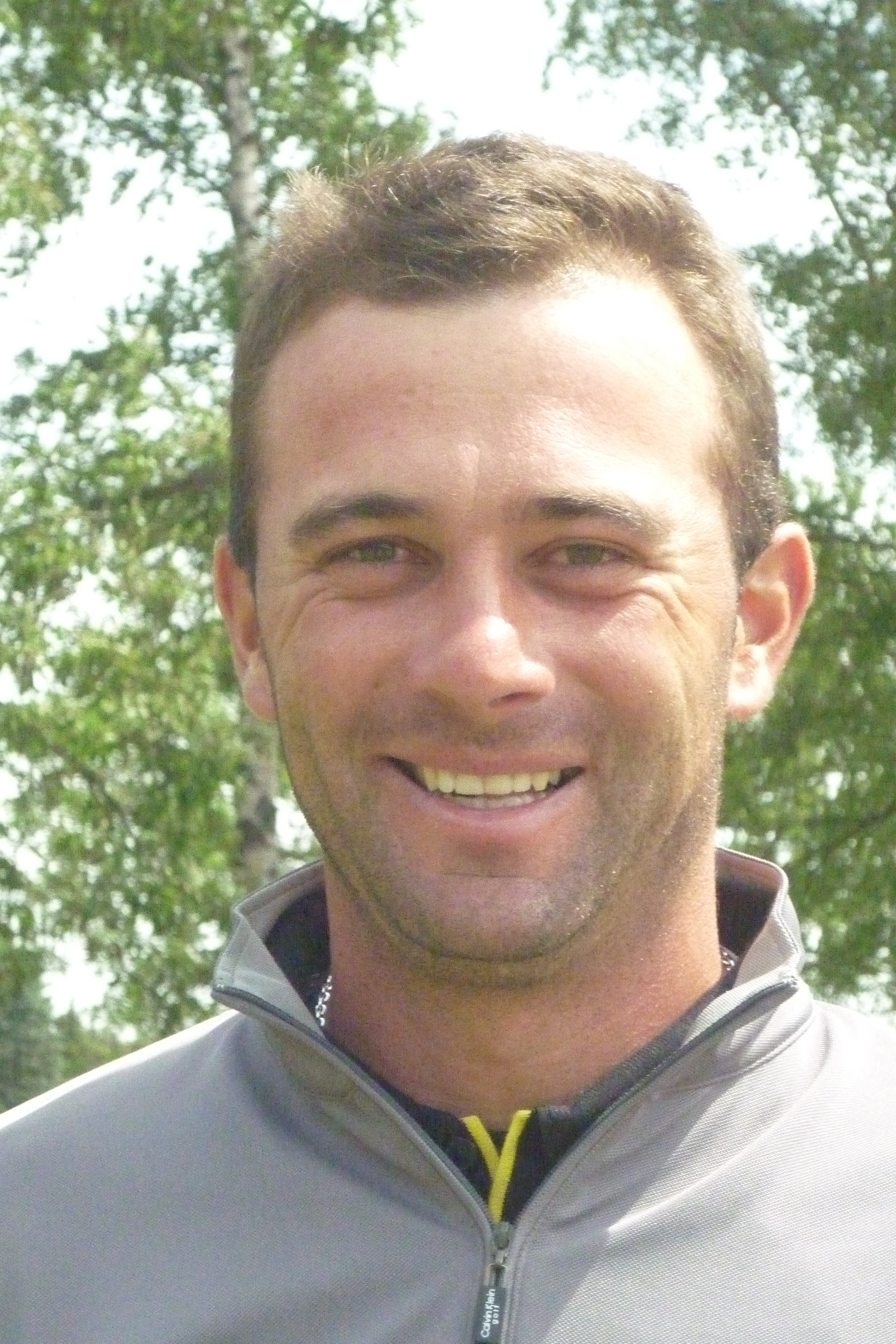

Personal information
- Nationality: Portugal
- Born: 7 September 1982 (age 44) Faro, Portugal
- Height: 1.85 m (6 ft 1 in)
- Spouse: Rita
- Children: 1

Career
- Sport: Golf
- Turned professional: 2006
- Current tour: European Tour
- Former tour: Challenge Tour
- Professional wins: 6

Number of wins by tour
- European Tour: 1
- Challenge Tour: 3
- Other: 3

Achievements and awards
- Sir Henry Cotton Rookie of the Year: 2012

Ricardo Santos (born 7 September 1982) is a Portuguese professional golfer who plays on the Challenge Tour. He won the 2012 Madeira Islands Open.

== Professional career ==
Santos turned professional in 2006. From 2007 to 2011 he played regularly on the Challenge Tour. In 2007, he was given an invite to the Madeira Islands Open on the European Tour, and led after the first round. He began the 2011 season well, making nine of his first ten cuts, including seven top-15 finishes. He then recorded his first Challenge Tour victory at The Princess, which took him to the top of the tour rankings. He was the first Portuguese-born golfer to win at this level, as José-Filipe Lima and Daniel Silva, despite representing Portugal, were born in France and South Africa respectively. He eventually finished 2011 in fourth place in the Order of Merit to gain a place on the European Tour in 2012.

In 2012 Santos won on the European Tour for the first time, on home soil at the Madeira Islands Open. He was named the European Tour's 2012 Sir Henry Cotton Rookie of the Year, finishing 90th in the Order of Merit. He had a good start to 2013 with five top-10 finishes between January and May. Despite a disappointing end to the season he finished 65th in the Order of Merit. 2014 was less successful and Santos finished 116th in the Order of Merit. In 2015 he split his time between the European Tour and the Challenge Tour.

Since 2015 Santos has played on the Challenge Tour. He was joint runner-up in the 2017 Hauts de France Golf Open. In 2019 Santos was runner-up in the D+D Real Czech Challenge and then won the next event, the Swiss Challenge, his first win on the tour since 2012.

== Professional wins (6) ==
=== European Tour wins (1) ===
No.	Date	Tournament	Winning score	Margin of victory	Runner-up
1	13 May 2012	Madeira Islands Open - Portugal^{1}	−22 (68-67-68-63=266)	4 strokes	(Sweden) Magnus A. Carlsson

^{1}Dual-ranking event with the Challenge Tour

=== Challenge Tour wins (3) ===
No.	Date	Tournament	Winning score	Margin of victory	Runner(s)-up
1	3 Jul 2011	The Princess	−16 (73-68-65-66=272)	3 strokes	(England) Daniel Brooks
2	13 May 2012	Madeira Islands Open - Portugal^{1}	−22 (68-67-68-63=266)	4 strokes	(Sweden) Magnus A. Carlsson
3	9 Jun 2019	Swiss Challenge	−15 (65-68-71-65=269)	1 stroke	(England) Richard Bland, (Germany) Moritz Lampert

^{1}Dual-ranking event with the European Tour

=== PGA EuroPro Tour wins (1) ===
No.	Date	Tournament	Winning score	Margin of victory	Runner-up
1	25 Jul 2008	Oceânico Algarve Championship	−13 (66-67-69=202)	1 stroke	(Portugal) Antonio Sobrinho

=== Other wins (2) ===
- 2010 Pestana Sives IGT Challenge
- 2011 Pestana Alto TGC Championships

== Team appearances ==
Amateur

- Eisenhower Trophy (representing Portugal): 2004
- St Andrews Trophy (representing the Continent of Europe): 2004
- European Amateur Team Championship (representing Portugal): 2003, 2005

Professional

- World Cup (representing Portugal): 2008, 2011, 2013
- European Championships (representing Portugal): 2018

== See also ==
- 2011 Challenge Tour graduates
- 2019 Challenge Tour graduates
- 2022 European Tour Qualifying School graduates
