= Matthew Southgate =

English golfer (born 1988)

Personal information
- Full name: Matthew Arthur T. Southgate
- Nationality: England
- Born: 3 October 1988 (age 38) Southend-on-Sea, Essex, England
- Height: 1.91 m (6 ft 3 in)
- Weight: 95 kg (209 lb; 15.0 st)

Career
- Sport: Golf
- Turned professional: 2010
- Current tour: Challenge Tour
- Former tour: European Tour
- Professional wins: 1

Number of wins by tour
- Challenge Tour: 1

Best results in major championships
- Masters Tournament: DNP
- PGA Championship: DNP
- U.S. Open: CUT: 2018, 2021
- The Open Championship: T6: 2017

Matthew Arthur T. Southgate (born 3 October 1988) is an English professional golfer who plays on the European Tour.

== Amateur career ==
Southgate's biggest success as an amateur was winning the 2010 St Andrews Links Trophy. His last round of 67 on the Old Course gave him victory by 5 shots.

== Professional career ==
After turning professional, Southgate played on the Challenge Tour in 2011, finishing second to Édouard Dubois in the Scottish Hydro Challenge. From 2012 to 2015 he had little success but finished 6th in the 6-round 2015 European Tour Qualifying School final stage at PGA Catalunya Resort to gain his European Tour card for 2016.

His big breakthrough came in the 2016 Dubai Duty Free Irish Open where he finished fourth behind Rory McIlroy, earning him 200,000 euros. He continued his run of good form by qualifying for the Open Championship by winning the final qualifying at Royal Cinque Ports, finishing tied for 11th in the Open de France and then tying for 12th place in the Open.

Southgate had a disappointing start to 2017 but hit form again in the same events as he had in 2016. He qualified again for the Open Championship through final qualifying at Royal Cinque Ports, was a joint runner-up in the Dubai Duty Free Irish Open, behind Jon Rahm, and tied for 6th place in the Open. In September 2017, in his bid to secure a PGA Tour card through the Web.com Tour Finals, Southgate was handed a four-stroke penalty in the DAP Championship after a leaf deflected the path of his golf ball mid-putt. Because he didn't replay the putt, he was handed a two-stroke penalty and another two strokes for signing an incorrect scorecard.

== Personal life ==
Southgate had testicular cancer in 2015. The cancer was diagnosed after he had played in the Aegean Airlines Challenge Tour in early July. He returned to competitive golf in September, in time to compete in the first stage of the European Tour qualifying.

== Amateur wins ==
- 2010 St Andrews Links Trophy

== Professional wins (1) ==
=== Challenge Tour wins (1) ===
No.	Date	Tournament	Winning score	Margin of victory	Runners-up
1	7 Jun 2026	Swiss Challenge	−23 (66-64-69-62=261)	8 strokes	(England) George Bloor, (Denmark) Hamish Brown, (Peru) Julián Périco, (England) Tom Sloman, (Slovakia) Tadeáš Teťák, (South Africa) Martin Vorster, (Scotland) Marc Warren

== Results in major championships ==
Results not in chronological order in 2020.

Tournament	2014	2015	2016	2017	2018
Masters Tournament					
U.S. Open					CUT
The Open Championship	CUT		T12	T6	T67
PGA Championship					

Tournament	2019	2020	2021	2022	2023	2024	2025	2026
Masters Tournament								
PGA Championship								
U.S. Open			CUT					
The Open Championship		NT			T23	CUT		T46

Top 10
Did not play

CUT = missed the half-way cut
"T" indicates a tie for a place
NT = no tournament due to COVID-19 pandemic

== Results in World Golf Championships ==
Tournament	2017
Championship	
Match Play	
Invitational	
Champions	T24

Did not play

"T" = Tied

== See also ==
- 2011 European Tour Qualifying School graduates
- 2012 European Tour Qualifying School graduates
- 2015 European Tour Qualifying School graduates
