= 2011 Challenge Tour graduates =

This is a list of players who graduated from the Challenge Tour in 2011. The top 20 players on the Challenge Tour's money list in 2011 earned their European Tour card for 2012.

	2011 Challenge Tour		2012 European Tour				
Player	Money list rank	Earnings (€)	Starts	Cuts made	Best finish	Money list rank	Earnings (€)
(England) Tommy Fleetwood*	1	148,913	31	16	T6	109	203,699
(Italy) Andrea Pavan*	2	133,052	28	8	T14	158	93,884
(England) Sam Little	3	130,798	28	8	T13	150	102,016
(Portugal) Ricardo Santos*	4	97,516	28	11	Win	90	264,174
(France) Benjamin Hébert	5	91,293	28	8	T6	176	67,314
(England) Daniel Denison*	6	86,898	26	7	T22	187	55,547
(Italy) Federico Colombo	7	81,834	26	8	T18	157	95,749
(England) Jamie Moul*	8	80,771	24	7	T35	200	37,581
(Spain) Jorge Campillo*	9	80,041	26	11	T2	81	319,348
(England) Matthew Baldwin*	10	76,972	26	16	T5	72	372,786
(France) Édouard Dubois*	11	75,623	22	8	T18	173	68,856
(Republic of Ireland) Simon Thornton	12	74,712	18	8	T11	161	88,599
(France) Julien Quesne	13	74,027	25	13	Win	63	420,722
(Scotland) Craig Lee	14	73,792	23	12	T7	115	193,334
(England) Andrew Johnston*	15	70,987	20	10	T33	163	84,765
(England) Sam Walker	16	67,584	11	5	T17	197	42,116
(France) Charles-Édouard Russo*	17	67,192	9	2	T53	296	4,756
(Sweden) Pelle Edberg	18	66,282	11	4	T4	162	85,918
(England) Chris Gane	19	64,488	8	2	T15	254	12,181
(Italy) Alessandro Tadini	20	62,630	8	4	T22	225	21,044

* European Tour rookie in 2012
T = Tied
The player retained his European Tour card for 2013 (finished inside the top 118).
The player did not retain his European Tour Tour card for 2013, but retained conditional status (finished between 119 and 155).
The player did not retain his European Tour card for 2013 (finished outside the top 155).

Hébert earned a direct promotion to the European Tour after his third win of 2011 in August; Little did the same in October.

== Winners on the European Tour in 2012 ==
No.	Date	Player	Tournament	Winning score	Margin of victory	Runner-up
1	18 Mar	(France) Julien Quesne	Open de Andalucía Costa del Sol	−17 (68-72-67-64=271)	2 strokes	(Italy) Matteo Manassero
2	13 May	(Portugal) Ricardo Santos	Madeira Islands Open	−22 (68-67-68-63=266)	4 strokes	(Sweden) Magnus A. Carlsson

== Runners-up on the European Tour in 2012 ==
No.	Date	Player	Tournament	Winner	Winning score	Runner-up score
1	19 Feb	(Spain) Jorge Campillo	Avantha Masters	(South Africa) Jbe' Kruger	−14 (70-69-66-69=274)	−12 (72-71-66-67=276)

== See also ==
- 2011 European Tour Qualifying School graduates
