= Benjamin Hébert =

French professional golfer (born 1987)

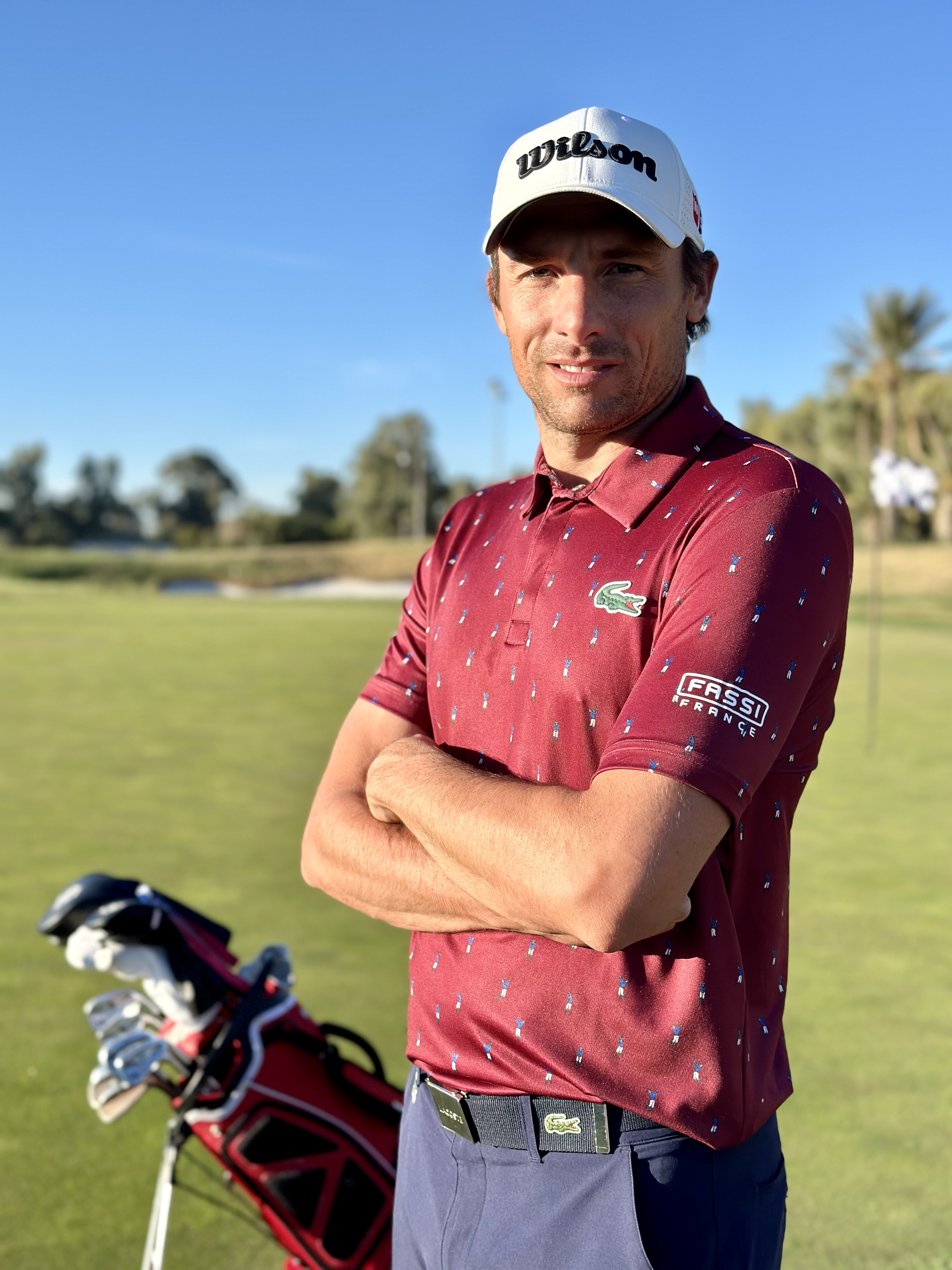

Personal information
- Nationality: France
- Born: 19 February 1987 (age 39) Brive, France
- Height: 1.84 m (6 ft 0 in)
- Weight: 74 kg (163 lb; 11.7 st)

Career
- Sport: Golf
- Turned professional: 2009
- Current tour: European Tour
- Former tour: Challenge Tour
- Professional wins: 8
- Highest ranking: 89 (10 November 2019)

Number of wins by tour
- Challenge Tour: 6 (Tied-5th all-time)
- Other: 2

Best results in major championships
- Masters Tournament: DNP
- PGA Championship: CUT: 2020
- U.S. Open: DNP
- The Open Championship: T33: 2021

Benjamin Hébert (born 19 February 1987) is a French professional golfer.

== Early life ==
In 1987, Hébert was born in Brive, France. His parents are Jean-Luc, a former pentathlete, and Françoise, a former swimmer, both of whom now work as teachers. He also has one sister, Audrey. Hébert spent some of his childhood in Tahiti, from age 14 to 18, before graduating from high school in 2005.

== Amateur career ==
Hébert enjoyed a successful amateur career. He spent three years on the French national team, the highlight being representing his country at the 2008 Eisenhower Trophy. He won a number of individual tournaments, the most notable being the European Amateur in 2007, which gained him entry to the following year's Open Championship. He also represented Europe in the St Andrews Trophy.

== Professional career ==
In 2009, Hébert turned professional. He enjoyed immediate success on the Challenge Tour, recording a third-place finish in the Piemonte Open after receiving a special invite. He recorded his first professional victory on the third-level Alps Tour later in the summer, before earning a card for the European Tour at qualifying school at the end of the year. However, he struggled to settle at this level, making twelve cuts but not recording a single top-twenty finish, and he failed to retain his card. In July 2011, Hébert won his first tournament on the Challenge Tour at the Credit Suisse Challenge. He followed up with a second win a week later at the English Challenge. He won his third tournament of the year, the Rolex Trophy, in August to earn a promotion to the European Tour.

In 2012, while on the European Tour, Hébert finished in the top-10 once, T-6 at the Lyoness Open and finished 195th on the Race to Dubai, losing his tour card. He returned to the Challenge Tour in 2013 and 2014. In 2014, he won his fourth Challenge Tour event in August at the Norwegian Challenge, he soon followed this up with his second with of the 2014 season in September at the Open Blue Green Côtes d'Armor Bretagne. In the final event of the 2014 season at the Dubai Festival City Challenge Tour Grand Final, he secured his third Challenge Tour win of the season and 6th career win on the tour. In doing so Hébert finished second in the Challenge Tour Rankings behind Andrew Johnston, which earned him European Tour card for 2015 and became the first player to have three Challenge Tour wins in two separate seasons.

Since 2015 Hébert has played on the European Tour. He was runner-up in the 2018 Belgian Knockout where he lost to Adrián Otaegui in the final. He lost in a playoff for the 2019 Volvo China Open against Mikko Korhonen. He also lost in a playoff for the 2019 Aberdeen Standard Investments Scottish Open against Bernd Wiesberger.

== Amateur wins ==
- 2006 Grand Prix de Niort
- 2007 European Amateur, La Coupe Mouchy (joint), Grand Prix de Bordeaux-Lac, Grand Prix Palmola, Grand Prix de Saint Cyprien

== Professional wins (8) ==
=== Challenge Tour wins (6) ===
Legend
Grand Finals (1)
Other Challenge Tour (5)

No.	Date	Tournament	Winning score	Margin of victory	Runner(s)-up
1	17 Jul 2011	Credit Suisse Challenge	−12 (67-67-67-71=272)	4 strokes	(England) Jamie Moul
2	24 Jul 2011	English Challenge	−12 (71-66-69-70=276)	2 strokes	(France) Victor Riu
3	27 Aug 2011	Rolex Trophy	−19 (66-65-71-67=269)	1 stroke	(Spain) Jorge Campillo, (England) Tommy Fleetwood
4	10 Aug 2014	Norwegian Challenge	−15 (65-67-69-72=273)	2 strokes	(Germany) Florian Fritsch
5	7 Sep 2014	Open Blue Green Côtes d'Armor Bretagne	−15 (66-66-67-66=265)	3 strokes	(Scotland) Andrew McArthur
6	8 Nov 2014	Dubai Festival City Challenge Tour Grand Final	−12 (70-69-68-69=276)	5 strokes	(France) Jérôme Lando-Casanova

Challenge Tour playoff record (0–1)

No.	Year	Tournament	Opponent	Result
1	2024	Le Vaudreuil Golf Challenge	(Spain) Joel Moscatel	Lost to par on first extra hole

=== Alps Tour wins (1) ===
No.	Date	Tournament	Winning score	Margin of victory	Runner-up
1	9 Aug 2009	Omnium of Belgium	−16 (69-71-66-66=272)	1 stroke	(Netherlands) Joost Luiten

=== French Tour wins (1) ===
No.	Date	Tournament	Winning score	Margin of victory	Runner-up
1	18 Oct 2014	Richard Mille Invitational	2 and 1		(France) Édouard Dubois

== Playoff record ==
European Tour playoff record (0–3)

No.	Year	Tournament	Opponent(s)	Result
1	2019	Volvo China Open	(Finland) Mikko Korhonen	Lost to birdie on first extra hole
2	2019	Aberdeen Standard Investments Scottish Open	(Austria) Bernd Wiesberger	Lost to par on third extra hole
3	2019	Turkish Airlines Open	(England) Tyrrell Hatton, (United States) Kurt Kitayama, (France) Victor Perez, (Austria) Matthias Schwab, (South Africa) Erik van Rooyen	Hatton won with par on fourth extra hole Kitayama eliminated by birdie on third hole Hébert, Perez and van Rooyen eliminated by birdie on first hole

== Results in major championships ==
Results not in chronological order in 2020.

Tournament	2008	2009	2010	2011	2012	2013	2014	2015	2016	2017	2018
Masters Tournament											
U.S. Open											
The Open Championship	CUT										
PGA Championship											

Tournament	2019	2020	2021
Masters Tournament			
PGA Championship		CUT	
U.S. Open			
The Open Championship	T41	NT	T33

Did not play

CUT = missed the half-way cut
"T" = tied
NT = No tournament due to COVID-19 pandemic

== Results in World Golf Championships ==
Tournament	2019	2020
Championship		T18
Match Play		NT^{1}
Invitational		
Champions	T65	NT^{1}

^{1}Cancelled due to COVID-19 pandemic

Did not play

NT = No tournament
"T" = Tied

== Team appearances ==
Amateur

- European Amateur Team Championship (representing France): 2008
- Eisenhower Trophy (representing France): 2008
- St Andrews Trophy (representing the Continent of Europe): 2008
- Bonallack Trophy (representing Europe): 2008 (winners)
- European Team Championships (representing France): 2008

== See also ==
- 2009 European Tour Qualifying School graduates
- 2011 Challenge Tour graduates
- 2014 Challenge Tour graduates
- 2024 Challenge Tour graduates
- List of golfers with most Challenge Tour wins
- List of golfers to achieve a three-win promotion from the Challenge Tour
