= Scottish Challenge =

Tournament information
- Location: Kelso, Scottish Borders, Scotland
- Established: 2006
- Course: Schloss Roxburghe
- Par: 71
- Length: 7,165 yards (6,552 m)
- Tour: Challenge Tour
- Format: Stroke play
- Prize fund: £250,000
- Month played: August

Tournament record score
- Aggregate: 262 Brandon Robinson-Thompson (2024)
- To par: −22 as above

Current champion
- (Sweden) Christofer Blomstrand

Location map
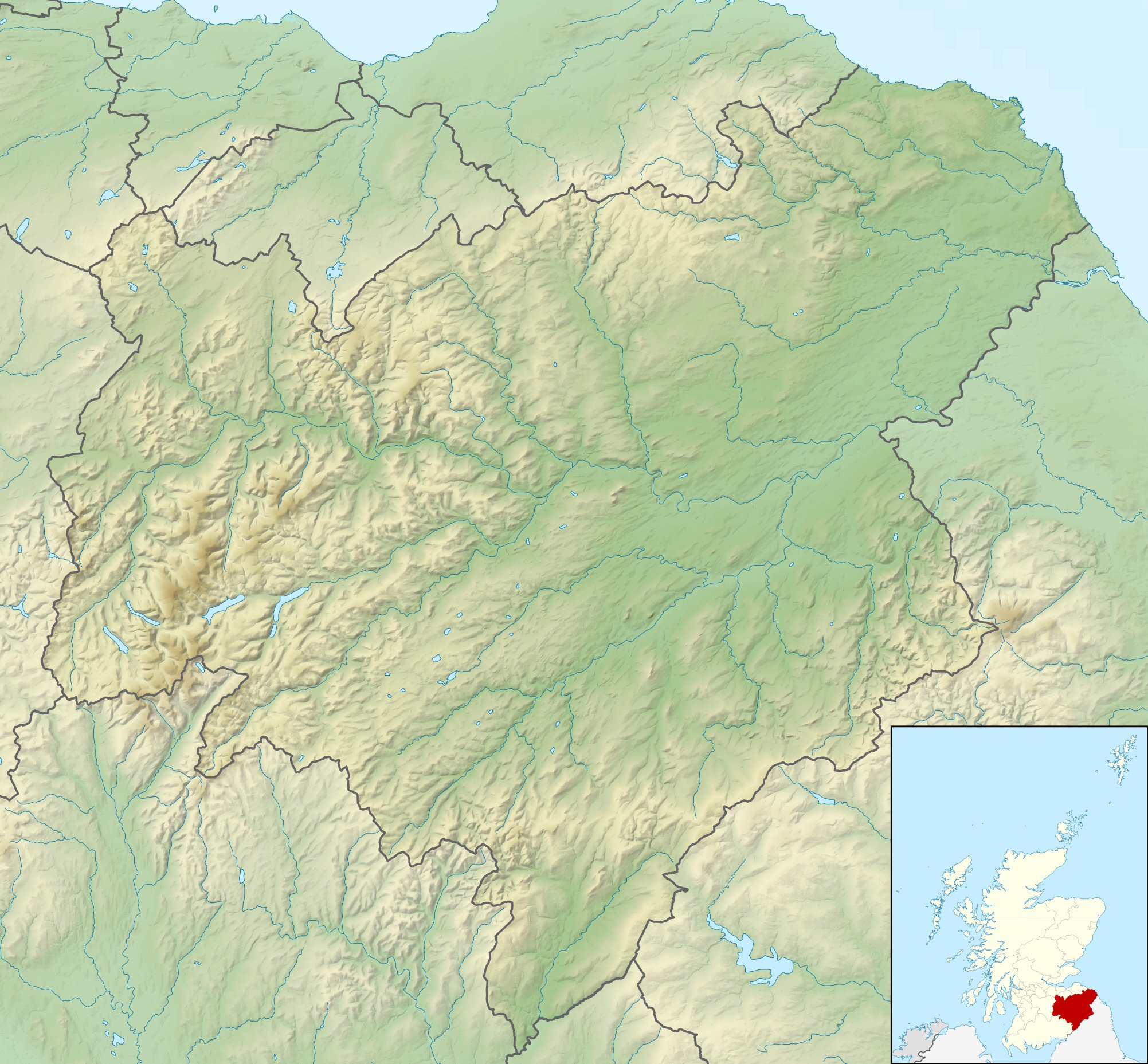
- Location in Scotland Location in the Scottish Borders

The Scottish Challenge is a golf tournament on the Challenge Tour. It was held annually from 2006 to 2018 and since 2022.

== Winners ==
Year	Winner	Score	To par	Margin of victory	Runner(s)-up	Venue
Scottish Challenge
2026	(Sweden) Christofer Blomstrand	265	−19	2 strokes	(Sweden) Adam Wallin	Schloss Roxburghe
Farmfoods Scottish Challenge
2025	(Scotland) Daniel Young	265	−19	1 stroke	(France) Julien Quesne	Schloss Roxburghe
2024	(England) Brandon Robinson-Thompson	262	−22	8 strokes	(Denmark) Hamish Brown	Newmachar
2023	(England) Sam Bairstow	269	−15	1 stroke	(France) Romain Wattel	Newmachar
2022	(Spain) Javier Sainz	273	−11	Playoff	(Switzerland) Jeremy Freiburghaus	Newmachar
2019–2021: No tournament
SSE Scottish Hydro Challenge
2018	(Scotland) David Law	273	−11	2 strokes	(Denmark) Joachim B. Hansen	Macdonald Spey Valley
2017	(England) Richard McEvoy	268	−16	4 strokes	(England) James Heath	Macdonald Spey Valley
2016	(England) James Heath	263	−21	2 strokes	(New Zealand) Ryan Fox	Macdonald Spey Valley
2015	(England) Jack Senior	268	−16	Playoff	(England) Robert Coles (Thailand) Prom Meesawat	Macdonald Spey Valley
Scottish Hydro Challenge
2014	(England) Andrew Johnston	265	−19	3 strokes	(Germany) Moritz Lampert (Australia) Terry Pilkadaris	Macdonald Spey Valley
2013	(United States) Brooks Koepka	266	−18	3 strokes	(South Korea) An Byeong-hun (Italy) Andrea Pavan (England) Steven Tiley (England) Sam Walker	Macdonald Spey Valley
2012	(England) Sam Walker (2)	201 (Note: Shortened to 54 holes due to weather.)	−12	Playoff	(England) Simon Wakefield	Macdonald Spey Valley
2011	(France) Édouard Dubois	271	−13	1 stroke	(England) Matthew Southgate	Macdonald Spey Valley
2010	(Scotland) George Murray	267	−17	4 strokes	(Sweden) Magnus A. Carlsson	Macdonald Spey Valley
2009	(Scotland) Jamie McLeary	276	−8	2 strokes	(Italy) Edoardo Molinari	Macdonald Spey Valley
Scottish Challenge
2008	(Netherlands) Taco Remkes	271	−13	5 strokes	(England) Seve Benson (Denmark) Jeppe Huldahl	Macdonald Cardrona Hotel
2007	(England) Robert Dinwiddie	268	−20	4 strokes	(Scotland) Jamie McLeary	Macdonald Cardrona Hotel
2006	(England) Sam Walker	266	−18	6 strokes	(Wales) Gareth Wright	Murcar Links
