= Garth Mulroy =

South African professional golfer (born 1978)

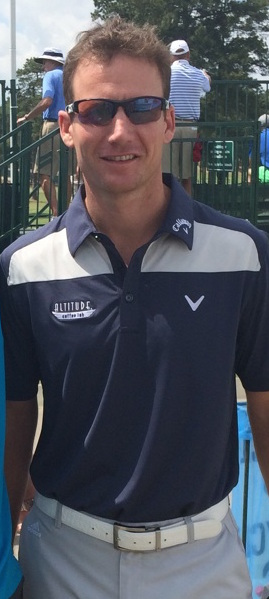
- Mulroy at 2014 U.S. Open

Personal information
- Full name: Garth David Mulroy
- Nationality: South Africa
- Born: 8 July 1978 (age 48) Durban, South Africa
- Height: 6 ft 0 in (1.83 m)
- Weight: 175 lb (79 kg; 12.5 st)
- Spouse: Catherine Mulroy
- Children: 2

Career
- Sport: Golf
- College: North Carolina State University
- Turned professional: 2002
- Former tours: PGA Tour; European Tour; Asian Tour; Sunshine Tour; Web.com Tour; Gateway Tour
- Professional wins: 8

Number of wins by tour
- European Tour: 1
- Sunshine Tour: 4
- Korn Ferry Tour: 2
- Other: 2

Best results in major championships
- Masters Tournament: DNP
- PGA Championship: DNP
- U.S. Open: T40: 2014
- The Open Championship: T64: 2012

Achievements and awards
- Sunshine Tour Order of Merit winner: 2011

Garth David Mulroy (born 8 July 1978) is a South African professional golfer.

== Early life and amateur career ==
In 1978, Mulroy was born in Durban, South Africa. He attended college in the United States at North Carolina State University. Mulroy earned All-American honors while at NC State.

== Professional career ==
In 2002, Mulroy turned professional.

Mulroy has predominantly tried to make his way as a professional in the United States, and has collected several victories on various mini-tours. He finished tied for 64th at the PGA Tour qualifying school at the end of 2006, earning a place on the Nationwide Tour for 2007. He has played on the second tier United States based tour since then, winning for the first time in April 2009 when he secured a one stroke victory over Chris Tidland at the South Georgia Classic. In 2009, he finished 14th on the money list to earn his 2010 PGA Tour card.

Mulroy has also competed on the Southern Africa-based Sunshine Tour. After winning his place on the tour at the 2007 qualifying school, he tied for 3rd in the South African Airways Open at the end of the year. He maintained that form into the 2008 season, as he won two minor tournaments and missed out in a playoff for the Joburg Open, one of the richer European Tour co-sanctioned events. He ended the year in second place on the Order of Merit behind Richard Sterne, who won all three European Tour co-sanctioned events.

A shaky 2010 season cost Mulroy his PGA Tour card, as he made six cuts in 19 events. He won the Nationwide Tour's BMW Charity Pro-Am in 2011. After struggling to maintain his Tour status stateside, Mulroy focused mainly on the Sunshine Tour and European Tour.

== Awards and honors ==
- While attending North Carolina State University, Mulroy earned All-American honors.
- In 2011, Mulroy finished atop the Sunshine Tour's Order of Merit standings.

== Professional wins (8) ==
=== European Tour wins (1) ===
| No. | Date | Tournament | Winning score | Margin of victory | Runner-up |
|---|---|---|---|---|---|
| 1 | 20 Nov 2011 | Alfred Dunhill Championship^{1} | −19 (69-68-64-68=269) | 2 strokes | (Scotland) George Murray |

^{1}Co-sanctioned by the Sunshine Tour

European Tour playoff record (0–1)

| No. | Year | Tournament | Opponents | Result |
|---|---|---|---|---|
| 1 | 2008 | Joburg Open | (Sweden) Magnus A. Carlsson, (South Africa) Richard Sterne | Sterne won with birdie on second extra hole |

=== Sunshine Tour wins (4) ===
| No. | Date | Tournament | Winning score | Margin of victory | Runner(s)-up |
|---|---|---|---|---|---|
| 1 | 29 Aug 2008 | Vodacom Origins of Golf at Arabella | −6 (69-72-69=210) | 4 strokes | (South Africa) Richard Sterne |
| 2 | 27 Nov 2008 | Coca-Cola Charity Championship | −19 (66-66-65=197) | 7 strokes | (South Africa) James Kamte, (South Africa) Chris Williams |
| 3 | 20 Nov 2011 | Alfred Dunhill Championship^{1} | −19 (69-68-64-68=269) | 2 strokes | (Scotland) George Murray |
| 4 | 20 Oct 2018 | Vodacom Origins of Golf (2) at Parys | −10 (67-69-70=206) | 1 stroke | (England) Chris Cannon, (Sweden) Fredrik From |

^{1}Co-sanctioned by the European Tour

Sunshine Tour playoff record (0–1)

| No. | Year | Tournament | Opponents | Result |
|---|---|---|---|---|
| 1 | 2008 | Joburg Open | (Sweden) Magnus A. Carlsson, (South Africa) Richard Sterne | Sterne won with birdie on second extra hole |

=== Nationwide Tour wins (2) ===
| No. | Date | Tournament | Winning score | Margin of victory | Runner-up |
|---|---|---|---|---|---|
| 1 | 26 Apr 2009 | South Georgia Classic | −13 (69-66-71-69=275) | 1 stroke | (United States) Chris Tidland |
| 2 | 12 Jun 2011 | BMW Charity Pro-Am | −18 (65-66-70-67=268) | Playoff | (South Korea) Kang Sung-hoon |

Nationwide Tour playoff record (1–0)

| No. | Year | Tournament | Opponent | Result |
|---|---|---|---|---|
| 1 | 2011 | BMW Charity Pro-Am | (South Korea) Kang Sung-hoon | Won with par on first extra hole |

=== Other wins (2) ===
- 2005 Big Stakes Match Play Championship (with David Ping)
- 2008 Gary Player Invitational (with Bobby Lincoln)

== Results in major championships ==
| Tournament | 2012 | 2013 | 2014 | 2015 |
|---|---|---|---|---|
| Masters Tournament | | | | |
| U.S. Open | | | T40 | CUT |
| The Open Championship | T64 | | | |
| PGA Championship | | | | |

Did not play

CUT = missed the half-way cut
"T" = tied

== Results in World Golf Championships ==
| Tournament | 2009 | 2010 | 2011 | 2012 |
|---|---|---|---|---|
| Match Play | | | | |
| Championship | T46 | | | T29 |
| Invitational | | | | |
| Champions | T40 | | | T56 |

Did not play

"T" = Tied

== See also ==
- 2009 Nationwide Tour graduates
- 2011 Nationwide Tour graduates
