= 2010 Challenge Tour =

Golf tour season

2010 Challenge Tour season
- Duration: 18 February 2010 – 30 October 2010
- Number of official events: 25 (Note: One further tournament was scheduled but was cancelled.)
- Most wins: (Denmark) Andreas Hartø (2) (Chile) Mark Tullo (2) (Spain) Álvaro Velasco (2) (Austria) Martin Wiegele (2) (Austria) Bernd Wiesberger (2)
- Rankings: (Spain) Álvaro Velasco

The 2010 Challenge Tour was the 22nd season of the Challenge Tour, the official development tour to the European Tour.

== Changes for 2010 ==
In August, the Official World Golf Ranking announced that the Apulia San Domenico Grand Final would gain "flagship event" status, meaning that the minimum points awarded would increase to 16 from 12.

== Schedule ==
The following table lists official events during the 2010 season.

Date	Tournament	Host country	Purse (€)	Winner (Note: The number in brackets after each winner's name is the number of Challenge Tour events they had won up to and including that tournament. This information is only shown for Challenge Tour members. It is rare for someone to accumulate many wins on the Challenge Tour as success at this level usually leads to promotion to the European Tour.)	OWGR points	Other tours (Note: CAN − Canadian Tour; DNK − Danish Golf Tour; EUR − European Tour; TLA − Tour de las Américas.)	Notes
21 Feb	Abierto Internacional de Golf II Copa Antioquia	Colombia	US$220,000	(Colombia) David Vanegas (1)	12	CAN, TLA	New to Challenge Tour
28 Mar	Kenya Open	Kenya	190,000	(England) Robert Dinwiddie (3)	12		
2 May	Turkish Airlines Challenge	Turkey	175,000	(England) Charlie Ford (1)	12		New tournament
9 May	Allianz Open Côtes d'Armor Bretagne	France	150,000	(England) Sam Walker (2)	12		
23 May	Mugello Tuscany Open	Italy	150,000	(Netherlands) Floris de Vries (1)	12		New tournament
30 May	Telenet Trophy	Belgium	150,000	(England) Lee Slattery (2)	12		
6 Jun	Kärnten Golf Open	Austria	160,000	(Austria) Martin Wiegele (2)	12		
13 Jun	Scottish Hydro Challenge	Scotland	200,000	(Scotland) George Murray (1)	12		
20 Jun (Note: Rescheduled due to the eruptions of Eyjafjallajökull.); ~~25 Apr~~	Moroccan Golf Classic	Morocco	150,000	(United States) Chris Baker (1)	12		
20 Jun	Saint-Omer Open	France	600,000	(Austria) Martin Wiegele (3)	18	EUR	
27 Jun	Fred Olsen Challenge de España	Spain	150,000	(Spain) Álvaro Velasco (1)	12		
4 Jul	The Princess	Sweden	150,000	(Denmark) Thorbjørn Olesen (1)	12		
11 Jul	Allianz Golf Open de Lyon	France	150,000	(Austria) Bernd Wiesberger (1)	12		
18 Jul	Credit Suisse Challenge	Switzerland	150,000	(Italy) Alessandro Tadini (3)	12		
25 Jul	English Challenge	England	150,000	(Australia) Daniel Gaunt (1)	12		
~~1 Aug~~	Green Challenge	Finland	–	Cancelled	–		
14 Aug	Rolex Trophy	Switzerland	215,000	(Chile) Mark Tullo (1)	12		
22 Aug	ECCO Tour Championship	Germany	DKr 1,350,000	(Denmark) Andreas Hartø (a) (1)	12	DNK	
28 Aug	SWALEC Wales Challenge	Wales	150,000	(Sweden) Oscar Florén (1)	12		
5 Sep	Allianz EurOpen Strasbourg	France	150,000	(France) Romain Wattel (a) (1)	12		
12 Sep	Kazakhstan Open	Kazakhstan	400,000	(Spain) Álvaro Velasco (2)	12		
19 Sep	M2M Russian Challenge Cup	Russia	175,000	(Spain) Carlos del Moral (2)	12		New tournament
10 Oct	Allianz Golf Open du Grand Toulouse	France	150,000	(Austria) Bernd Wiesberger (2)	12		
16 Oct	Roma Golf Open	Italy	150,000	(Denmark) Andreas Hartø (2)	12		
23 Oct	Egyptian Open	Egypt	250,000	(Chile) Mark Tullo (2)	14		New to Challenge Tour
30 Oct	Apulia San Domenico Grand Final	Italy	300,000	(England) Matt Haines (1)	16		Flagship event

== Rankings ==
The rankings were based on prize money won during the season, calculated in Euros. The top 20 players on the rankings earned status to play on the 2011 European Tour.

Rank	Player	Prize money (€)
1	(Spain) Álvaro Velasco	134,297
2	(England) Matt Haines	107,152
3	(Denmark) Thorbjørn Olesen	104,754
4	(Netherlands) Floris de Vries	101,288
5	(Austria) Bernd Wiesberger	99,989
