= Norwegian Challenge =

Tournament information
- Location: Kløfta, Norway
- Established: 1994
- Course: Miklagard Golfklub
- Par: 72
- Length: 7,375 yards (6,744 m)
- Tours: Challenge Tour; Nordic Golf League
- Format: Stroke play
- Prize fund: €200,000
- Month played: August
- Final year: 2017

Tournament record score
- Aggregate: 266 Kristoffer Broberg (2012)
- To par: −22 as above

Final champion
- (France) Clément Sordet
- Location in Norway

The Norwegian Challenge was a golf tournament on the Challenge Tour, played in Norway. It was founded in 1994 and was the leading men's tournament in Norway, which does not host a European Tour event.

== Winners ==
Year	Tour (Note: CHA − Challenge Tour; NGL − Nordic Golf League.)	Winner	Score	To par	Margin of victory	Runner(s)-up	Venue
Viking Challenge
2017	CHA	(France) Clément Sordet	203 (Note: Shortened to 54 holes due to rain.)	−13	5 strokes	(Scotland) Jack Doherty (England) Charlie Ford (Netherlands) Daan Huizing	Miklagard
Norwegian Open
2016	NGL	(Sweden) Oscar Lengdén	204	−12	6 strokes	(Sweden) Gustaf Kocken	Moss & Rygge
2015: No tournament
Norwegian Challenge
2014	CHA	(France) Benjamin Hébert	273	−15	2 strokes	(Germany) Florian Fritsch	Miklagard
2013	CHA	(Sweden) Jens Fahrbring	269	−19	3 strokes	(United States) Daniel Im (Sweden) Pontus Widegren	Losby
2012	CHA	(Sweden) Kristoffer Broberg	266	−22	Playoff	(Spain) Álvaro Velasco	Byneset
2011	CHA	(Italy) Andrea Pavan	279	−9	Playoff	(Austria) Florian Praegant	Hauger
Lexus Open
2009–10: No tournament
2008	CHA	(Denmark) Jeppe Huldahl	271	−17	2 strokes	(Scotland) Steven O'Hara	Moss & Rygge
2007	CHA	(Austria) Martin Wiegele	278	−10	Playoff	(Scotland) George Murray	Miklagard
2006	CHA	(Sweden) Kalle Brink	275	−13	3 strokes	(Spain) José Manuel Carriles (Scotland) Greig Hutcheon (Norway) Peter Kaensche (Norway) Jan-Are Larsen	Larvik
Norwegian Challenge
2005: No tournament
2004	CHA	(Republic of Ireland) Stephen Browne	205	−11	3 strokes	(Sweden) Oskar Bergman (England) Denny Lucas (England) Mark Sanders	Vestfold
2002–03: No tournament
Telehuset Norwegian Open
2001	NGL	(Sweden) Björn Bäck	276	−12	3 strokes	(Denmark) Brian Akstrup	Nes
Norwegian Open
2000	CHA	(Sweden) Paul Nilbrink	206	−10	Playoff	(Sweden) Per Larsson (England) Stuart Little	Losby
1999	CHA	(Sweden) Pehr Magnebrant	281	−7	3 strokes	(Sweden) Patrik Gottfridson	Sorknes
Netcom Norwegian Open
1998	CHA	(England) Gary Emerson	275	−17	1 stroke	(Sweden) Max Anglert	Borre
1997	CHA	(Switzerland) Demitri Bieri	275	−13	Playoff	(England) John Bickerton	Oslo
Karsten Ping Norwegian Open
1996	CHA	(Spain) Ignacio Feliu	273	−15	1 stroke	(England) John Mellor	Oslo
1995	CHA	(England) Stephen Field	275	−13	3 strokes	(England) Andrew Collison	Oslo
Karsten Ping Norwegian Challenge
1994	CHA	(Northern Ireland) Raymond Burns	276	−16	3 strokes	(England) Jamie Taylor	Borre

== See also ==
- Open golf tournament
