= Álvaro Velasco (golfer) =

Spanish professional golfer

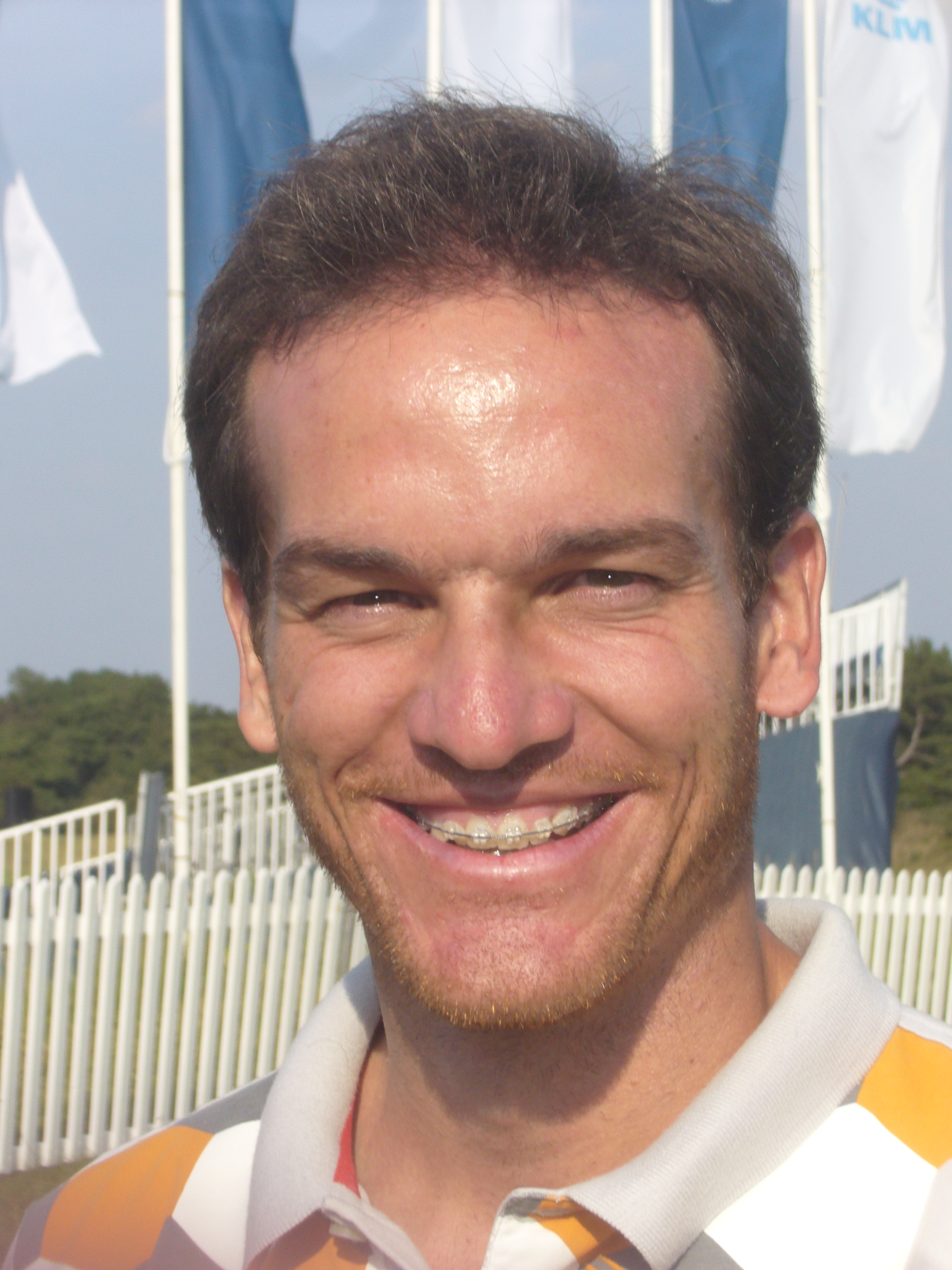

Personal information
- Full name: Álvaro Velasco Roca
- Nickname: Veli
- Nationality: Spain
- Born: 15 May 1981 (age 45) Barcelona, Spain
- Height: 1.78 m (5 ft 10 in)
- Weight: 70 kg (154 lb; 11 st 0 lb)
- Spouse: Marta (m. 2009)

Career
- Sport: Golf
- College: Coastal Carolina University
- Turned professional: 2005
- Current tour: Challenge Tour
- Former tour: European Tour
- Professional wins: 3

Number of wins by tour
- Challenge Tour: 3

Achievements and awards
- Challenge Tour Rankings winner: 2010
Medal record
Mediterranean Games
Gold medal – first place	2018 Tarragona	Men's team

Álvaro Velasco Roca (born 15 May 1981) is a Spanish professional golfer.

== Early life and amateur career ==
Velasco was born in Barcelona and attended Coastal Carolina University on a golf scholarship where he graduated with a degree in Business Administration.

== Professional career ==
In 2005, Velasco turned professional. He worked his way through the ranks graduating to the top level European Tour in 2008.

Velasco finished 100th on the Order of Merit in 2008, but fell back to the second tier Challenge Tour in 2010 having finished 189th in the Race to Dubai rankings in 2009. He recorded the biggest win of his career at the 2010 Fred Olsen Challenge de España, before trumping this by winning the Kazakhstan Open, the Challenge Tour's biggest event. He would also win the Challenge Tour Rankings, to secure a return to the main tour.

At the 2018 Mediterranean Games, Velasco won a gold medal in the men's team competition.

== Amateur wins ==
- 2001 Italian International Amateur Championship
- 2005 Spanish Amateur Closed Championship, Biarritz Cup

== Professional wins (3) ==
=== Challenge Tour wins (3) ===
No.	Date	Tournament	Winning score	Margin of victory	Runner(s)-up
1	27 Jun 2010	Fred Olsen Challenge de España	−18 (70-63-68-65=266)	2 strokes	(Scotland) Elliot Saltman
2	12 Sep 2010	Kazakhstan Open	−21 (67-66-65-69=267)	5 strokes	(Italy) Federico Colombo, (Scotland) Scott Jamieson, (Argentina) Julio Zapata
3	4 Sep 2016	Cordon Golf Open	−12 (68-68-70-62=268)	1 stroke	(Germany) Alexander Knappe, (Sweden) Oscar Stark

Challenge Tour playoff record (0–1)

No.	Year	Tournament	Opponent	Result
1	2012	Norwegian Challenge	(Sweden) Kristoffer Broberg	Lost to birdie on second extra hole

== Team appearances ==
Amateur

- European Amateur Team Championship (representing Spain): 2005

== See also ==
- 2007 Challenge Tour graduates
- 2010 Challenge Tour graduates
