= Sam Walker (golfer) =

English golfer

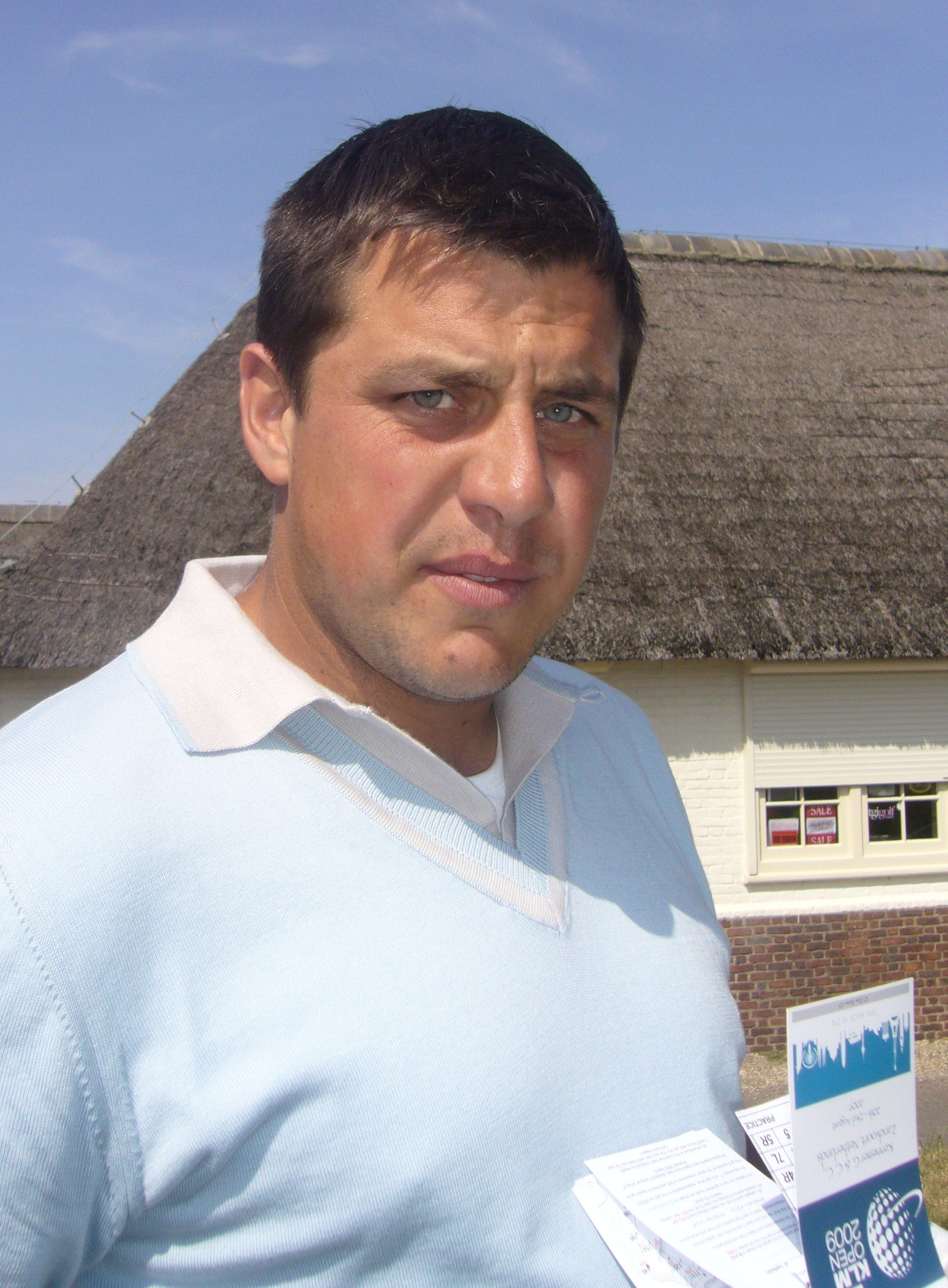

Personal information
- Full name: Sam James Walker
- Nationality: England
- Born: 1 March 1978 (age 48) Birmingham, England
- Height: 6 ft 0 in (1.83 m)
- Weight: 168 lb (76 kg; 12.0 st)

Career
- Sport: Golf
- Turned professional: 2000
- Current tour: Challenge Tour
- Former tour: European Tour
- Professional wins: 6

Number of wins by tour
- Challenge Tour: 5 (Tied-8th all-time)
- Other: 1

Best results in major championships
- Masters Tournament: DNP
- PGA Championship: DNP
- U.S. Open: CUT: 2007
- The Open Championship: CUT: 2012

Sam James Walker (born 1 March 1978) is an English professional golfer.

== Career ==
Walker was born in Birmingham and turned professional in 2000. He came through the ranks, starting his career on the third tier MasterCard Tour before graduating to the Challenge Tour and finally the top level European Tour. He has struggled to establish himself at the highest level, only retaining his card once in 2007 when he finished 80th on the Order of Merit.

Walker has five wins on the second tier Challenge Tour, the first coming in 2006 at the Scottish Challenge and the second in 2010 at the Allianz Open Côtes d'Armor Bretagne. He picked up his third victory in June 2012, reclaiming the Scottish Hydro Challenge. He added two wins in 2016, the Vierumäki Finnish Challenge in August and the Kazakhstan Open in October

== Professional wins (6) ==
=== Challenge Tour wins (5) ===
No.	Date	Tournament	Winning score	Margin of victory	Runner(s)-up
1	9 Jul 2006	Scottish Challenge	−18 (68-69-64-65=266)	6 strokes	(Wales) Gareth Wright
2	9 May 2010	Allianz Open Côtes d'Armor Bretagne	−8 (63-70-70-69=272)	1 stroke	(France) Victor Riu, (Scotland) Raymond Russell
3	24 Jun 2012	Scottish Hydro Challenge (2)	−12 (64-67-70=201) (Note: Shortened to 54 holes due to weather.)	Playoff	(England) Simon Wakefield
4	14 Aug 2016	Vierumäki Finnish Challenge	−15 (68-68-69-68=273)	2 strokes	(France) Julien Guerrier, (Scotland) Scott Henry, (France) Romain Langasque, (Netherlands) Darius van Driel
5	2 Oct 2016	Kazakhstan Open	−18 (69-67-65-69=270)	1 stroke	(England) Jordan Smith

Challenge Tour playoff record (1–2)

No.	Year	Tournament	Opponent(s)	Result
1	2003	Tessali-Metaponto Open di Puglia e Basilicata	(Switzerland) André Bossert, (England) Martin LeMesurier	LeMesurier won with par on second extra hole Walker eliminated by birdie on first hole
2	2003	Ryder Cup Wales Challenge	(England) Robert Coles, (England) Robert Rock, (Wales) Craig Williams	Williams won with birdie on first extra hole
3	2012	Scottish Hydro Challenge	(England) Simon Wakefield	Won with birdie on third extra hole

=== MasterCard Tour wins (1) ===
- 2000 Hawkstone Park

== Results in major championships ==
Tournament	2007	2008	2009	2010	2011	2012
U.S. Open	CUT					
The Open Championship						CUT

Note: Walker never played in the Masters Tournament or the PGA Championship.

Did not play

CUT = missed the half-way cut

== Team appearances ==
Amateur

- European Boys' Team Championship (representing England): 1996

== See also ==
- 2006 Challenge Tour graduates
- 2011 Challenge Tour graduates
- 2016 Challenge Tour graduates
- List of golfers with most Challenge Tour wins
