= 2011 Challenge Tour =

Golf tour season

2011 Challenge Tour season
- Duration: 13 January 2011 – 5 November 2011
- Number of official events: 25
- Most wins: (France) Benjamin Hébert (3) (England) Sam Little (3)
- Rankings: (England) Tommy Fleetwood

The 2011 Challenge Tour was the 23rd season of the Challenge Tour, the official development tour to the European Tour.

== Schedule ==
The following table lists official events during the 2011 season.

Date	Tournament	Host country	Purse (€)	Winner (Note: The number in brackets after each winner's name is the number of Challenge Tour events they had won up to and including that tournament. This information is only shown for Challenge Tour members. It is rare for someone to accumulate many wins on the Challenge Tour as success at this level usually leads to promotion to the European Tour.)	OWGR points	Other tours (Note: DNK − Danish Golf Tour; EUR − European Tour; PGTI − Professional Golf Tour of India; TLA − Tour de las Américas.)	Notes
16 Jan	Gujarat Kensville Challenge	India	200,000	(India) Gaganjeet Bhullar (n/a)	12	PGTI	New tournament
13 Mar	Abierto Internacional Copa Antioquia	Colombia	US$230,000	(Argentina) Joaquín Estévez (1)	12	TLA	
3 Apr	Barclays Kenya Open	Kenya	195,000	(South Africa) Michiel Bothma (1)	12		
8 May	Allianz Challenge de France	France	150,000	(Germany) Nicolas Meitinger (1)	12		
15 May	Mugello Tuscany Open	Italy	150,000	(France) Anthony Snobeck (2)	12		
22 May	Madeira Islands Open	Portugal	500,000	(Northern Ireland) Michael Hoey (4)	18	EUR	
29 May	Telenet Trophy	Belgium	160,000	(Australia) Andrew Tampion (2)	12		
5 Jun	Kärnten Golf Open	Austria	160,000	(France) Édouard Dubois (1)	12		
12 Jun	Allianz Open Côtes d'Armor Bretagne	France	150,000	(England) Phillip Archer (2)	12		
19 Jun	Saint-Omer Open	France	500,000	(Australia) Matthew Zions (1)	18	EUR	
26 Jun	Scottish Hydro Challenge	Scotland	220,000	(France) Édouard Dubois (2)	12		
3 Jul	The Princess	Sweden	200,000	(Portugal) Ricardo Santos (1)	12		
10 Jul	Acaya Open	Italy	160,000	(England) Jamie Moul (1)	12		New tournament
17 Jul	Credit Suisse Challenge	Switzerland	155,000	(France) Benjamin Hébert (1)	12		
24 Jul	English Challenge	England	160,000	(France) Benjamin Hébert (2)	12		
14 Aug	Norwegian Challenge	Norway	180,000	(Italy) Andrea Pavan (1)	12		
20 Aug	ECCO Tour Championship	Denmark	DKr 1,200,000	(England) Daniel Denison (1)	12	DNK	
27 Aug	Rolex Trophy	Switzerland	190,000	(France) Benjamin Hébert (3) (Note: Hébert earned immediate promotion to the European Tour, as this was his third win of the season.)	12		
11 Sep	Kazakhstan Open	Kazakhstan	400,000	(England) Tommy Fleetwood (1)	12		
18 Sep	M2M Russian Challenge Cup	Russia	250,000	(England) Sam Little (3)	12		
25 Sep	Allianz Golf Open Grand Toulouse	France	160,000	(England) Sam Little (4)	12		
2 Oct	Fred Olsen Challenge de España	Spain	150,000	(England) Matthew Baldwin (1)	12		
9 Oct	Allianz Golf Open de Lyon	France	150,000	(France) Julien Quesne (2)	12		
16 Oct	Roma Golf Open	Italy	160,000	(England) Sam Little (5) (Note: Little earned immediate promotion to the European Tour, as this was his third win of the season.)	12		
5 Nov	Apulia San Domenico Grand Final	Italy	330,000	(Italy) Andrea Pavan (2)	16		Flagship event

== Rankings ==
The rankings were based on prize money won during the season, calculated in Euros. The top 20 players on the rankings earned status to play on the 2012 European Tour.

Rank	Player	Prize money (€)
1	(England) Tommy Fleetwood	148,913
2	(Italy) Andrea Pavan	133,052
3	(England) Sam Little	130,798
4	(Portugal) Ricardo Santos	97,516
5	(France) Benjamin Hébert	91,293
