= Andrew Johnston (golfer) =

English professional golfer

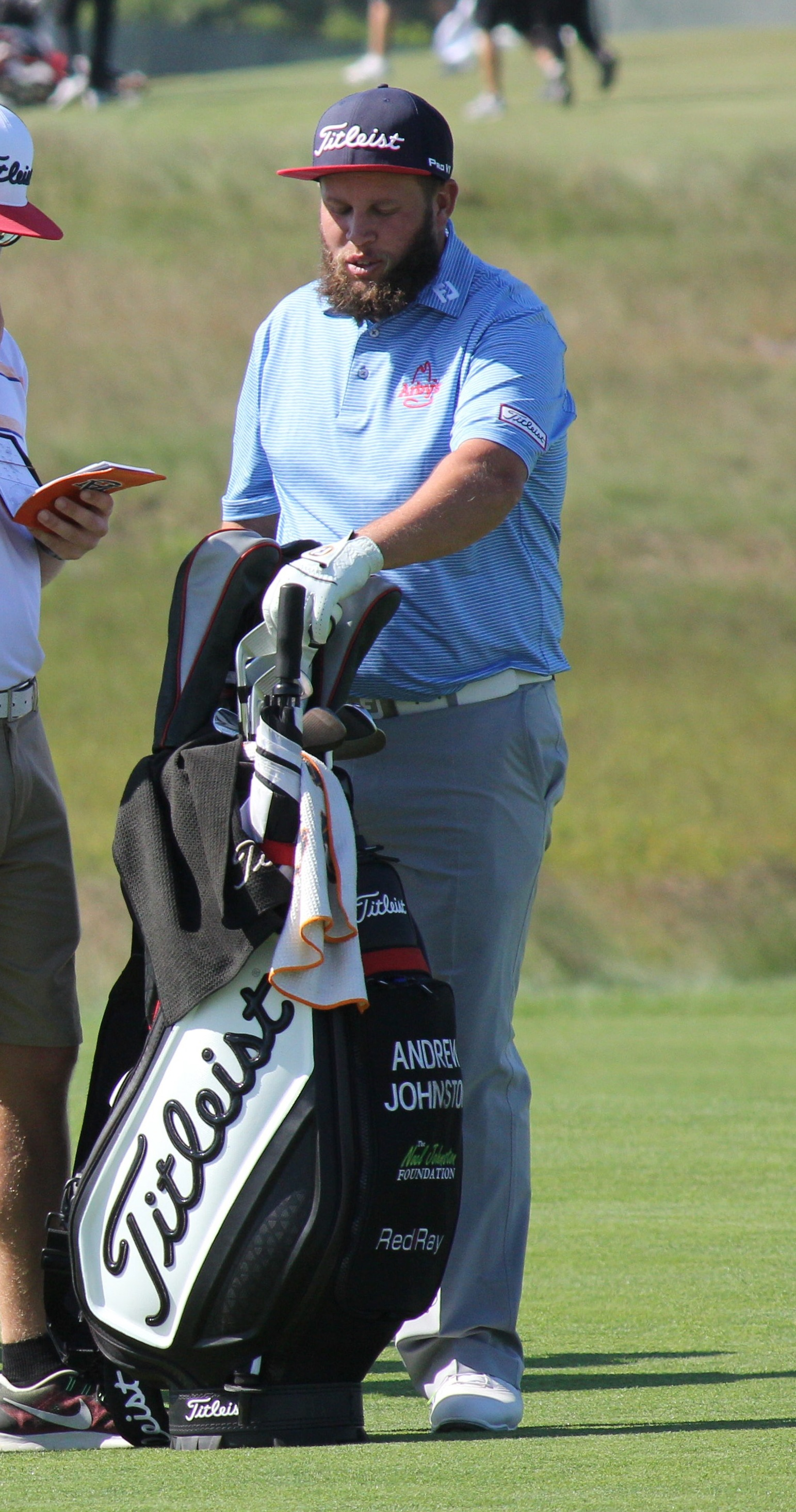

Personal information
- Full name: Andrew Thomas Johnston
- Nickname: Beef
- Nationality: England
- Born: 18 February 1989 (age 37) London, England
- Height: 1.76 m (5 ft 9 in)
- Weight: 96 kg (212 lb; 15.1 st)

Career
- Sport: Golf
- Turned professional: 2009
- Current tour: European Tour
- Former tours: Challenge Tour; PGA Tour
- Professional wins: 5
- Highest ranking: 74 (4 September 2016)

Number of wins by tour
- European Tour: 1
- Challenge Tour: 2
- Other: 2

Best results in major championships
- Masters Tournament: DNP
- PGA Championship: T60: 2016
- U.S. Open: T42: 2017
- The Open Championship: 8th: 2016

Achievements and awards
- Challenge Tour Rankings winner: 2014

Andrew Thomas Johnston (born 18 February 1989) is an English professional golfer who plays on the European Tour. He has one win on the European Tour, which came at the 2016 Open de España. Known affectionately as "Beef" since his youth, he has carried the nickname into his professional career, and is a popular character amongst the crowd.

== Early life and amateur career ==
Johnston, who is of partial Jamaican descent, was born in London in 1989 to a working-class family. His father worked as a bus driver and his mother as a school dinner lady.

He started playing golf at the age of four with his father and siblings in a local chip and putt course, and later joined the North Middlesex Golf Club, which is still his home club today. At 14, he was in The Middlesex Junior Squad, and became a scratch player at 16.

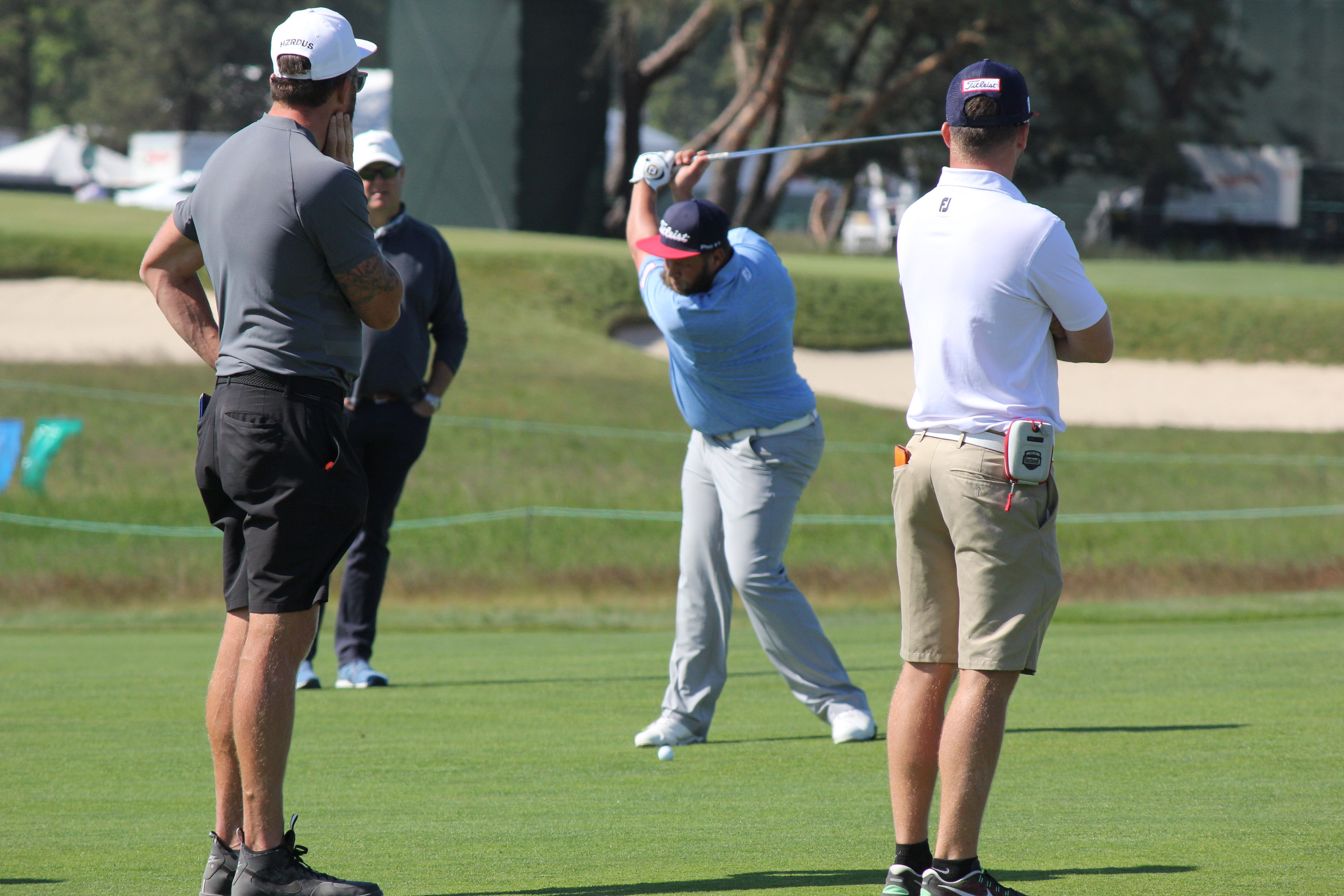
Johnston (centre) taking a golf swing at the practice rounds of the 2018 U.S. Open.

Johnston was a successful amateur, representing England boys and the Great Britain and Ireland team in the Jacques Léglise Trophy.

== Professional career ==
In 2009, Johnston turned professional and won for the first time that year on the Jamega Tour. After a 2010 season split between the Jamega Tour, the PGA EuroPro Tour and invites to the Challenge Tour, Johnston enjoyed a breakthrough season in 2011. He played in his first European Tour event at the Alfred Dunhill Championship in South Africa, and qualified for his first major championship, the Open Championship, via local final qualifying at Royal Cinque Ports. Johnston also recorded several good results from invites to the Challenge Tour, including a runner-up spot at the M2M Russian Challenge Cup. That qualified him for the Grand Final, where he finished in a tie for third to jump to 15th in the standings and secure a place on the European Tour for 2012.

Johnston played 20 events in his first season on the European Tour, without being able to make any top-10 result and ultimately failing to retain his tour membership.

In 2013, he was back on the Challenge Tour, where he registered a 5th place at the Finnish Challenge and a 6th place at the Northern Ireland Open Challenge, but failed to gain the European Tour membership by finishing only 68th in the final Order of Merit. At the end of the year, he entered the European Tour Qualifying School; after winning the Second Qualifying Stage at Valle Romano Golf, he again came short finishing 52nd at the final event at the PGA Catalunya Resort.

In 2014, Johnston finally found success in the Challenge Tour by winning two events, the Scottish Hydro Challenge and the Le Vaudreuil Golf Challenge; he ended up winning also the final Order of Merit and regained his European Tour membership.

In his second season on the European Tour Johnston started with a 3rd place at the Alfred Dunhill Championship, but struggled to make other positive results, missing 11 cuts in 25 events. At the end of the season he was able to retain his tour card thanks to a 10th place at the Turkish Airlines Open.

His 2016 started in January with a 4th place at the Qatar Masters, after which Johnston earned his first European Tour win at the 2016 Real Club Valderrama Open de España. He went on to on secure two other top-10 results at the BMW PGA Championship and at the 145th Open Championship, where he enjoyed remarkable popularity for his look, personality and game. After the Open he entered for the first time in his career the top-100 of the Official World Golf Ranking at the 89th place.

In September, Johnston entered the Web.com Tour Finals in an attempt to gain a PGA Tour card for 2017; he achieved that at the second event of the series, the Albertsons Boise Open, where he finished 4th. As a result, he got a card for the 2017 PGA Tour.

In 2024, HarperCollins published Johnston's autobiography, Golf Is Hard.

== Personal life ==
He is married to Jodie Valencia. They have a daughter named Harley Noelle.

== Professional wins (5) ==
=== European Tour wins (1) ===
No.	Date	Tournament	Winning score	Margin of victory	Runners-up
1	17 Apr 2016	Real Club Valderrama Open de España	+1 (67-74-74-70=285)	1 stroke	(Netherlands) Joost Luiten

European Tour playoff record (0–1)

No.	Year	Tournament	Opponent	Result
1	2018	Hero Indian Open	(England) Matt Wallace	Lost to birdie on first extra hole

=== Challenge Tour wins (2) ===
No.	Date	Tournament	Winning score	Margin of victory	Runners-up
1	29 Jun 2014	Scottish Hydro Challenge	−19 (66-65-68-66=265)	3 strokes	(Germany) Moritz Lampert, (Australia) Terry Pilkadaris
2	27 Jul 2014	Le Vaudreuil Golf Challenge	−16 (66-69-69-64=268)	2 strokes	(South Korea) An Byeong-hun, (United States) Connor Arendell, (Sweden) Jens Fahrbring, (France) Clément Sordet (a)

=== Jamega Pro Golf Tour wins (2) ===
- 2009 The Warwickshire
- 2011 The Vale of Glamorgan

== Results in major championships ==
Tournament	2011	2012	2013	2014	2015	2016	2017	2018
Masters Tournament								
U.S. Open						T54	T42	62
The Open Championship	CUT					8	T27	
PGA Championship						T60	WD	

Tournament	2019
Masters Tournament	
PGA Championship	
U.S. Open	
The Open Championship	CUT

Top 10
Did not play

CUT = missed the half-way cut
WD = withdrew
"T" indicates a tie for a place

=== Summary ===
Tournament	Wins	2nd	3rd	Top-5	Top-10	Top-25	Events	Cuts made
Masters Tournament	0	0	0	0	0	0	0	0
PGA Championship	0	0	0	0	0	0	2	1
U.S. Open	0	0	0	0	0	0	3	3
The Open Championship	0	0	0	0	1	1	4	2
Totals	0	0	0	0	1	1	9	6

- Most consecutive cuts made – 5 (2016 U.S. Open – 2017 Open Championship)
- Longest streak of top-10s – 1

== Results in World Golf Championships ==
Tournament	2016
Championship	
Match Play	
Invitational	T42
Champions	T47

Did not play

"T" = Tied

== Team appearances ==
Amateur

- European Boys' Team Championship (representing England): 2007
- Jacques Léglise Trophy (representing Great Britain and Ireland): 2007 (winners)

== See also ==
- 2011 Challenge Tour graduates
- 2014 Challenge Tour graduates
- 2016 Web.com Tour Finals graduates
