= Matthew Zions =

Australian professional golfer

Personal information
- Nationality: Australia
- Born: 27 December 1978 (age 47) Gosford, New South Wales, Australia
- Height: 6 ft 1 in (1.85 m)
- Weight: 187 lb (85 kg; 13.4 st)

Career
- Sport: Golf
- College: University of Colorado
- Turned professional: 2003
- Former tours: European Tour; PGA Tour of Australasia; Challenge Tour
- Professional wins: 1

Number of wins by tour
- European Tour: 1
- Challenge Tour: 1

Best results in major championships
- Masters Tournament: DNP
- PGA Championship: DNP
- U.S. Open: DNP
- The Open Championship: CUT: 2007

Matthew Zions (born 27 December 1978) is an Australian professional golfer.

== Early life and amateur career ==
Zions was born in Gosford, Australia. He grew up in the Mid North Coast region of New South Wales, where he played at the Kempsey Golf Club. His father Paul Zions is a former representative golfer.

Zions moved to the United States and played college golf at the University of Colorado. He also competed in inter-school tennis events.

== Professional career ==
In 2003, Zions turned professional. Zions played on the European Tour (earning his tour card through Q-School) in 2007, the PGA Tour of Australasia and the Challenge Tour in 2008, and the Challenge Tour in 2009 and 2010. In 2010, he re-earned his European Tour card by finishing 15th on the Challenge Tour Order of Merit.

Zions played in the 2007 Open Championship, missing the cut.

Zions won the 2011 Saint-Omer Open, which gives him an exemption until the end of the 2012 European Tour season. Zions finished 124th on the European Tour money list, normally six spots outside keeping his Tour Card, but his win exempted him for the season.

Zions dropped down to the Challenge Tour for 2013, and then retired from full-time golf. In 2014 he worked for R.K. Pinson & Associates as a petroleum landman.

== Professional wins (1) ==
=== European Tour wins (1) ===
No.	Date	Tournament	Winning score	Margin of victory	Runners-up
1	19 Jun 2011	Saint-Omer Open^{1}	−8 (68-72-67-69=276)	7 strokes	(England) Daniel Denison, (Sweden) Peter Gustafsson, (Scotland) Craig Lee

^{1}Dual-ranking event with the Challenge Tour

=== Challenge Tour wins (1) ===
No.	Date	Tournament	Winning score	Margin of victory	Runners-up
1	19 Jun 2011	Saint-Omer Open^{1}	−8 (68-72-67-69=276)	7 strokes	(England) Daniel Denison, (Sweden) Peter Gustafsson, (Scotland) Craig Lee

^{1}Dual-ranking event with the European Tour

== Results in major championships ==
Tournament	2007
The Open Championship	CUT

Note: Zions only played in The Open Championship.
CUT = missed the half-way cut

== See also ==
- 2006 European Tour Qualifying School graduates
- 2010 Challenge Tour graduates
