= George Murray (golfer) =

Scottish professional golfer

Personal information
- Full name: George Murray
- Nationality: Scotland
- Born: 10 June 1983 (age 43) Anstruther, Scotland
- Height: 6 ft 0 in (1.83 m)

Career
- Sport: Golf
- Turned professional: 2006
- Current tour: Challenge Tour
- Former tour: European Tour
- Professional wins: 1

Number of wins by tour
- Challenge Tour: 1

Best results in major championships
- Masters Tournament: DNP
- PGA Championship: DNP
- U.S. Open: DNP
- The Open Championship: CUT: 2013

George Murray (born 10 June 1983) is a Scottish professional golfer.

== Career ==
Murray was born in Anstruther, Fife and after a successful amateur career, turned professional in 2006 when he reached the final stage of the European Tour Qualifying School. This result qualified him for the Challenge Tour where he won for the first time in 2010 at the Scottish Hydro Challenge. The win helped him to a top ten end of season ranking which earned him a place on the European Tour for 2011.

On 4 October 2011, Murray finished third in the Alfred Dunhill Links Championship at St Andrews, Scotland - his highest finish on the European Tour. The Scotsman said after a fog delay on the third day, a young fan asked for his autograph - for the first time ever. Murray later said it was the young fan that inspired to play well as he enjoyed feeling the success.

After a poor 2012 season, Murray lost his playing rights and failed to regain his card at qualifying school by one shot after making a double bogey at the last hole.

== Amateur wins ==
- 1999 Scottish Boys Under-16 Championship
- 2004 Scottish Amateur Championship

== Professional wins (1) ==
=== Challenge Tour wins (1) ===
| No. | Date | Tournament | Winning score | Margin of victory | Runner-up |
|---|---|---|---|---|---|
| 1 | 13 Jun 2010 | Scottish Hydro Challenge | −17 (67-67-67-66=267) | 4 strokes | (Sweden) Magnus A. Carlsson |

Challenge Tour playoff record (0–1)

| No. | Year | Tournament | Opponent | Result |
|---|---|---|---|---|
| 1 | 2007 | Lexus Open | (Austria) Martin Wiegele | Lost to par on first extra hole |

== Team appearances ==
Amateur

- Eisenhower Trophy (representing Scotland): 2004, 2006
- European Amateur Team Championship (representing Scotland): 2005

== See also ==
- 2010 Challenge Tour graduates
