= Édouard Dubois =

French golfer

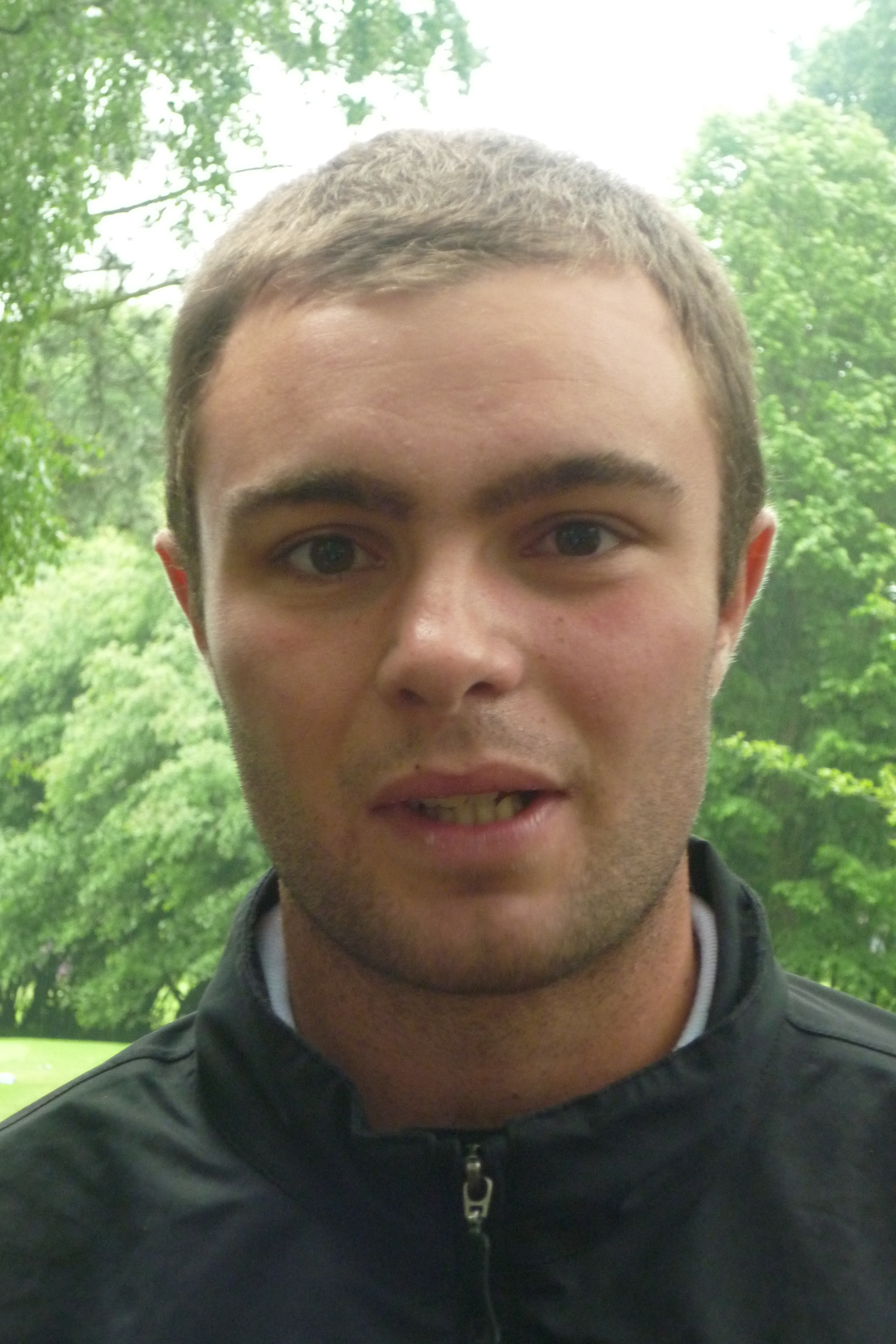

Personal information
- Nationality: France
- Born: 14 March 1989 (age 37) Libourne, France
- Height: 1.76 m (5 ft 9 in)

Career
- Sport: Golf
- Turned professional: 2008
- Current tour: Challenge Tour
- Former tour: European Tour
- Professional wins: 5

Number of wins by tour
- Challenge Tour: 2
- Other: 3

Édouard Dubois (born 14 March 1989) is a French professional golfer.

== Career ==
Dubois was born in Libourne, France. He turned professional in 2008.

In 2009, Dubois finished sixth on the Alps Tour Order of Merit, including his maiden professional win, and progressed to the final stage of European Tour Qualifying School, which earned him a Challenge Tour card. He finished 42nd on that tour in his 2010 debut season, qualifying for the end-of-season Grand Final, and in 2011 picked up his first win at that level, at the Kärnten Golf Open. He followed this with a second win three weeks later.

== Amateur wins ==
- 2008 Trophée de Margaux

== Professional wins (5) ==
=== Challenge Tour wins (2) ===
No.	Date	Tournament	Winning score	Margin of victory	Runner-up
1	5 Jun 2011	Kärnten Golf Open	−23 (70-67-65-63=265)	4 strokes	(Italy) Andrea Pavan
2	26 Jun 2011	Scottish Hydro Challenge	−13 (67-69-66-69=271)	1 stroke	(England) Matthew Southgate

=== Alps Tour wins (1) ===
No.	Date	Tournament	Winning score	Margin of victory	Runner-up
1	27 Mar 2009	Grande Finale Attijariwafabank	−7 (70-68-74=212)	Playoff	(France) Benjamin Hébert

=== Pro Golf Tour wins (1) ===
No.	Date	Tournament	Winning score	Margin of victory	Runner-up
1	8 Mar 2019	Open Royal Golf Anfa Mohammedia	−5 (69-70-66=205)	2 strokes	(Switzerland) Benjamin Rusch

=== Other wins (1) ===
- 2011 Open d'Arcachon

== Team appearances ==
Amateur

- European Boys' Team Championship (representing France): 2004, 2005, 2006, 2007
- Jacques Léglise Trophy (representing Continental Europe): 2007
- European Amateur Team Championship (representing France): 2008

== See also ==
- 2011 Challenge Tour graduates
