= Robert Dinwiddie (golfer) =

English professional golfer (born 1982)

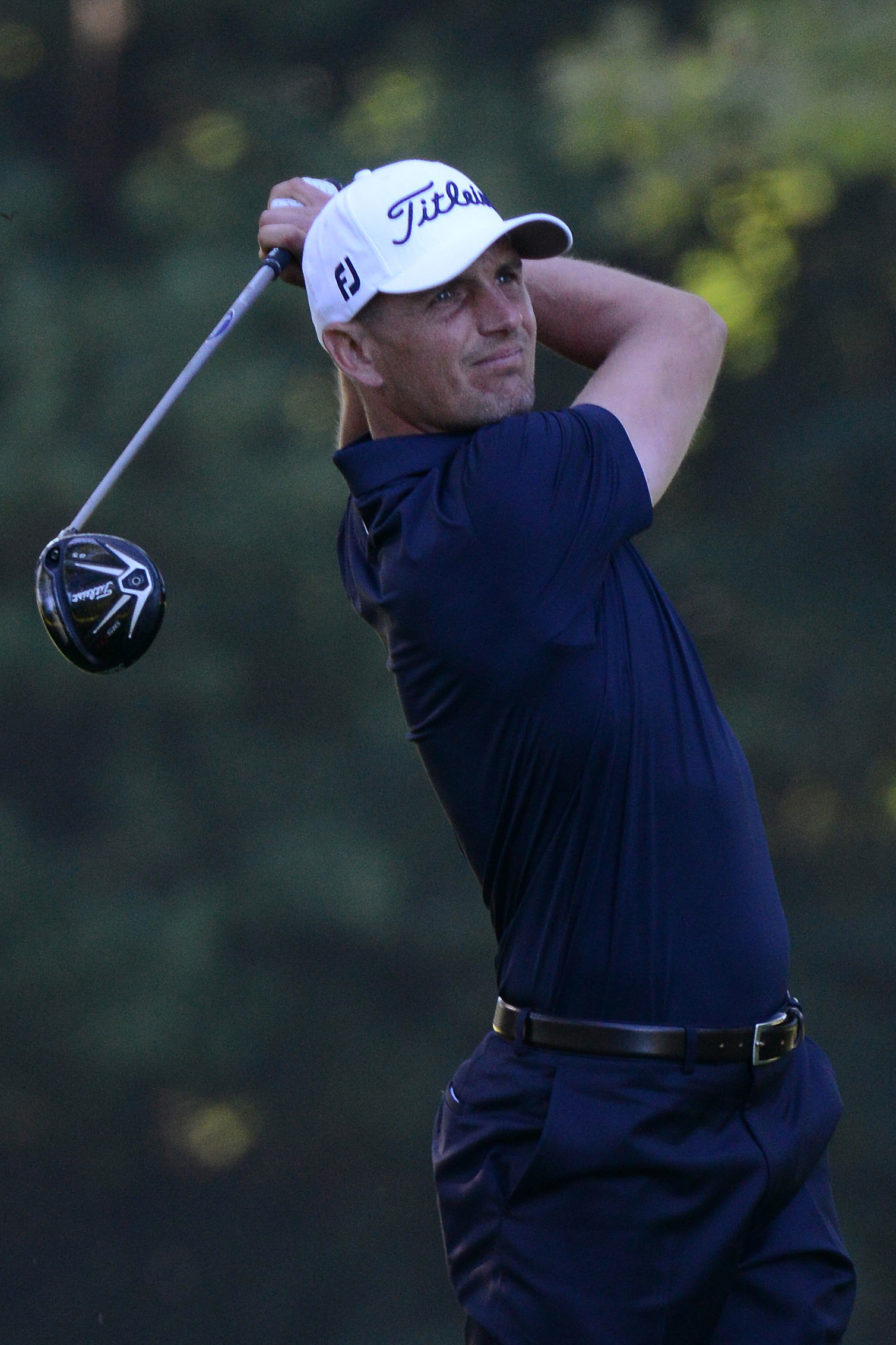
- Open Qualifying, Woburn 2015

Personal information
- Full name: Robert Maitland Dinwiddie
- Nationality: England
- Born: 29 December 1982 (age 43) Dumfries, Scotland
- Height: 6 ft 1 in (1.85 m)
- Weight: 182 lb (83 kg; 13.0 st)

Career
- Sport: Golf
- College: Tennessee State University
- Turned professional: 2006
- Current tour: Challenge Tour
- Former tour: European Tour
- Professional wins: 3

Number of wins by tour
- Challenge Tour: 3

Best results in major championships
- Masters Tournament: DNP
- PGA Championship: DNP
- U.S. Open: T36: 2008
- The Open Championship: T53: 2022

Robert Maitland Dinwiddie (born 29 December 1982) is an English professional golfer.

== Early life and amateur career ==
In 1982, Dinwiddie was born in Dumfries, Scotland. He was assisted by College Prospects of America to gain a golf scholarship at Tennessee State University, and was the number one ranked English golfer.

Dinwiddie won Welsh and Scottish Amateur Open Stroke Play Championships in 2005, and when he also claimed the English Amateur Open Stroke Play Championship, otherwise known as the Brabazon Trophy, in 2006, he became the first person to hold all three titles at the same time.

== Professional career ==
Dinwiddie turned professional towards the end of 2006 and joined the Challenge Tour. He had an immediate impact, finishing tied 11th in just his second tournament. He went on to end the season in 8th place on the rankings, aided by back to back victories in August at the Scottish Challenge and the Rolex Trophy, which was enough to gain automatic promotion to the European Tour.

In his first season on the European Tour, Dinwiddie had five top ten finishes, including tied 3rd at the BMW Asian Open and tied 6th at the Barclays Scottish Open, on his way to 72nd on the final Order of Merit. He also qualified for the U.S. Open at Torrey Pines, through final qualifying at Walton Heath. He made an impressive major championship début, finishing in a tie for 36th place.

After a difficult 2009 season, Dinwiddie returned to the Challenge Tour for 2010, where he promptly won the Kenya Open, the second event of the year. He followed this with a string of top ten finishes to ensure a return to the main tour for 2011.

== Amateur wins ==
- 2005 Welsh Amateur Open Stroke Play Championship, Scottish Amateur Open Stroke Play Championship, Simon Bolivar Cup
- 2006 Brabazon Trophy

== Professional wins (3) ==
=== Challenge Tour wins (3) ===
No.	Date	Tournament	Winning score	Margin of victory	Runner-up
1	12 Aug 2007	Scottish Challenge	−20 (70-63-68-67=268)	4 strokes	(Scotland) Jamie McLeary
2	19 Aug 2007	Rolex Trophy	−18 (70-68-68-64=270)	3 strokes	(England) Ross McGowan
3	28 Mar 2010	Kenya Open	−12 (68-69-70-65=272)	3 strokes	(Argentina) Julio Zapata

== Results in major championships ==
Tournament	2008	2009	2010	2011	2012	2013	2014	2015	2016	2017	2018	2019
U.S. Open	T36			CUT								
The Open Championship								CUT		CUT		

Tournament	2020	2021	2022
U.S. Open			
The Open Championship	NT		T53

Did not play

CUT = missed the half-way cut
"T" = tied
NT = no tournament due to the COVID-19 pandemic
Note: Dinwiddie only played in the U.S. Open and The Open Championship.

== Team appearances ==
Amateur

- Walker Cup (representing Great Britain & Ireland): 2005
- St Andrews Trophy (representing Great Britain & Ireland): 2006 (winners)
- Simon Bolivar Cup (representing England): 2005

== See also ==
- 2007 Challenge Tour graduates
- 2010 Challenge Tour graduates
- 2013 Challenge Tour graduates
