= Matt Haines =

English golfer (born 1989)

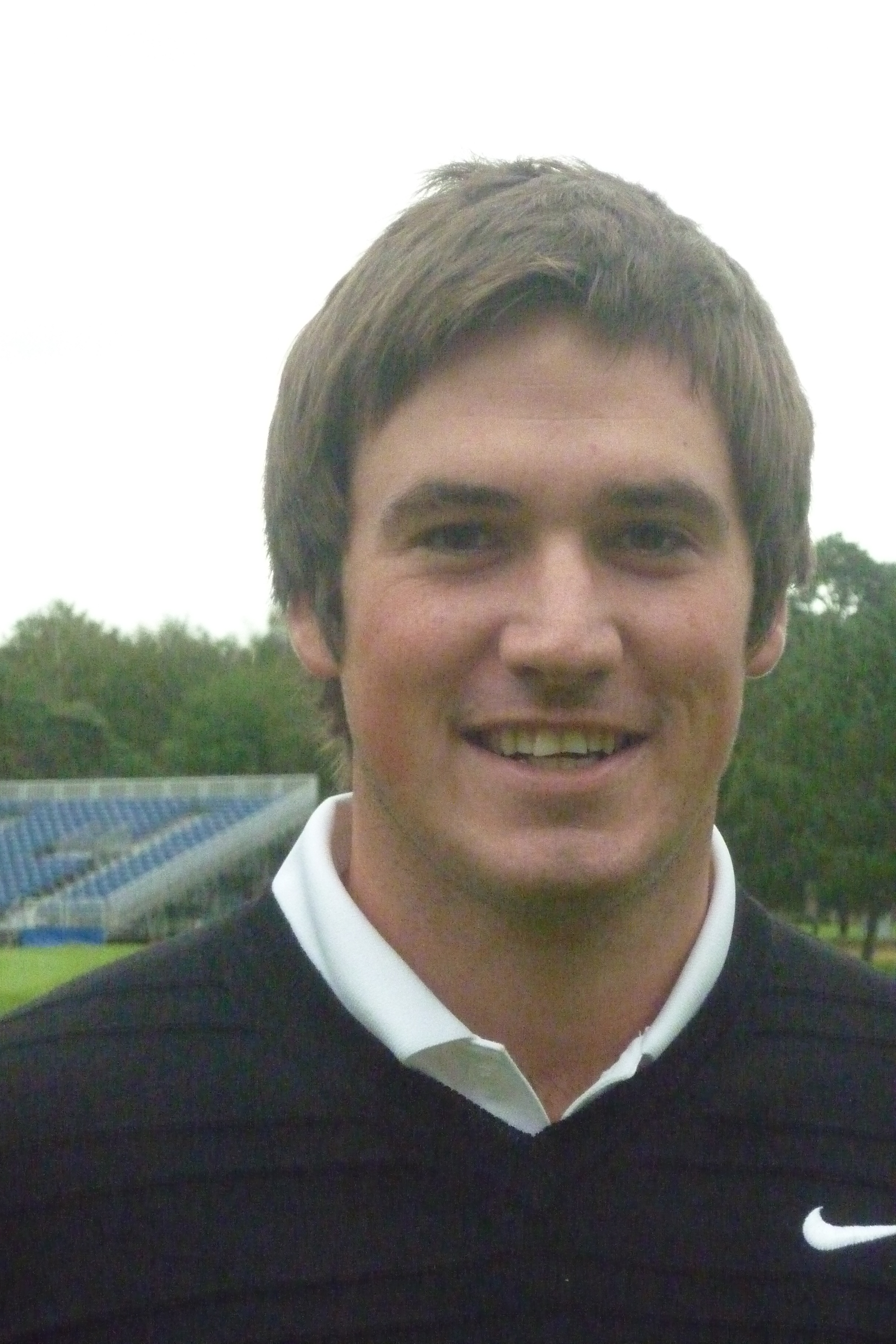
- Haines at the 2011 KLM Open

Personal information
- Nationality: England
- Born: 1 December 1989 (age 36) Chatham, Kent
- Height: 5 ft 10 in (1.78 m)
- Weight: 158 lb (72 kg; 11.3 st)

Career
- Sport: Golf
- Turned professional: 2010
- Former tours: European Tour; Challenge Tour
- Professional wins: 1

Number of wins by tour
- Challenge Tour: 1

Matthew Haines (born 1 December 1989) is an English professional golfer.

== Career ==
Haines turned professional in May 2010 after a successful amateur career, during which he became the youngest ever winner of the Lytham Trophy and represented Great Britain and Ireland in the 2009 Walker Cup as well as England in the European Amateur Team Championship.

Haines began playing on the 2010 Challenge Tour and won the season's final event, the Apulia San Domenico Grand Final. He finished second on the Challenge Tour Rankings to earn his European Tour card for 2011. Haines only made the cut in 8 of his 35 starts and dropped down to the Challenge Tour for 2012. He played on the Challenge Tour from 2012 to 2014.

Haines attended The Howard School in Rainham, Kent.

== Amateur wins ==
- 2007 Peter McEvoy Trophy, Carris Trophy
- 2008 Lytham Trophy
- 2009 Berkhamsted Trophy, Duncan Putter, Hampshire Salver
- 2010 Spanish International Amateur Championship

== Professional wins (1) ==
=== Challenge Tour wins (1) ===
Legend
Grand Finals (1)
Other Challenge Tour (0)

| No. | Date | Tournament | Winning score | Margin of victory | Runner-up |
|---|---|---|---|---|---|
| 1 | 30 Oct 2010 | Apulia San Domenico Grand Final | −8 (69-72-69-66=276) | 1 stroke | (Australia) Daniel Gaunt |

== Team appearances ==
Amateur

- European Boys' Team Championship (representing England): 2007
- European Amateur Team Championship (representing England): 2008, 2009
- Walker Cup (representing Great Britain and Ireland): 2009
- Bonallack Trophy (representing Europe): 2010 (cancelled)
- Jacques Léglise Trophy (representing Great Britain and Ireland): 2007 (winners)
- St Andrews Trophy (representing Great Britain and Ireland): 2008 (winners)

== See also ==
- 2010 Challenge Tour graduates
