= Daniel Denison (golfer) =

English golfer (born 1985)

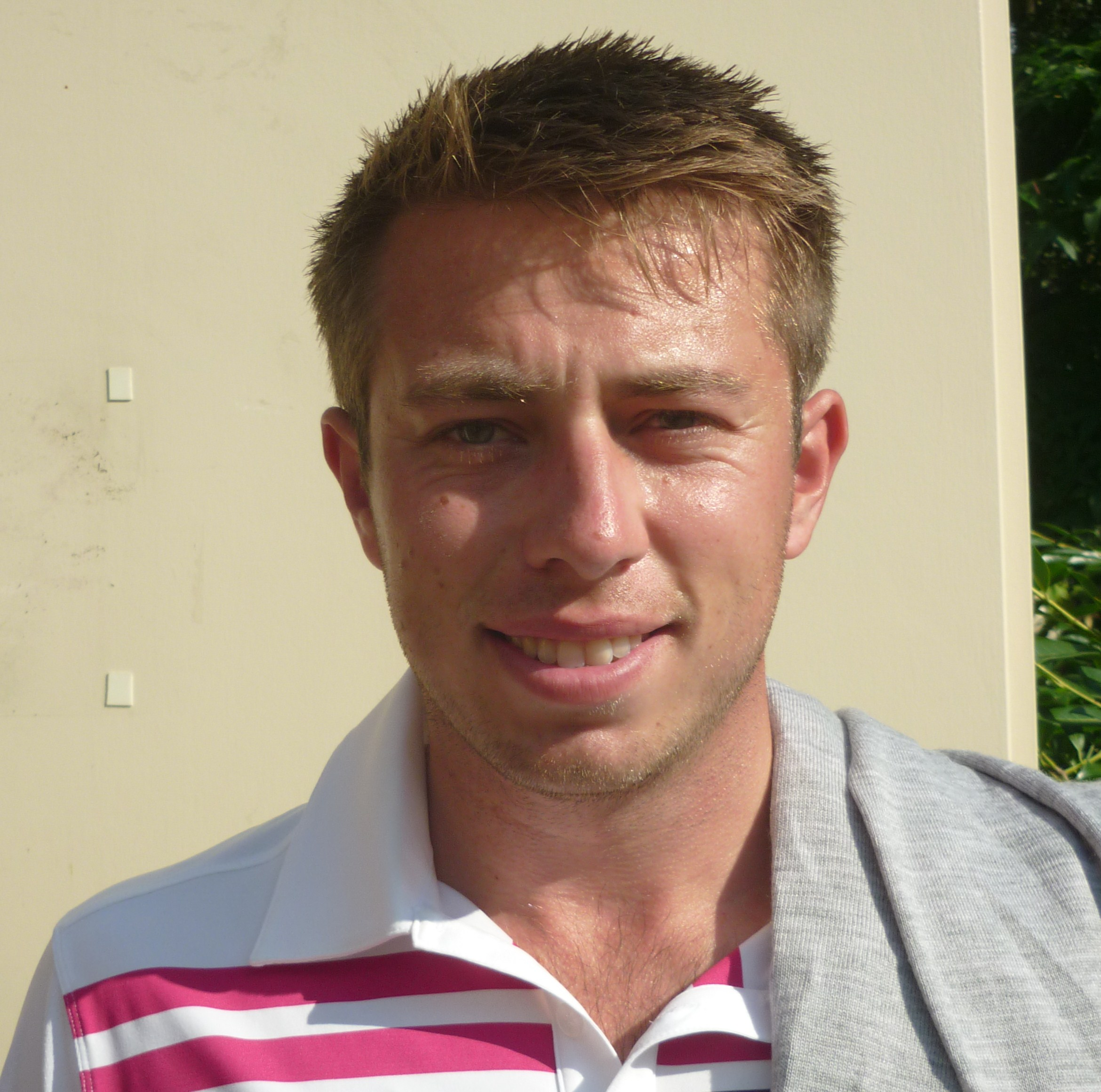

Personal information
- Nationality: England
- Born: 14 February 1985 (age 41) Leeds, England
- Height: 5 ft 10 in (1.78 m)
- Weight: 163 lb (74 kg; 11.6 st)

Career
- Sport: Golf
- Turned professional: 2006
- Former tours: European Tour; Challenge Tour
- Professional wins: 1

Number of wins by tour
- Challenge Tour: 1

Best results in major championships
- Masters Tournament: DNP
- PGA Championship: DNP
- U.S. Open: DNP
- The Open Championship: CUT: 2006

Daniel Denison (born 14 February 1985) is an English professional golfer who plays on the Challenge Tour.

Denison broke both of his legs in a car accident in 2007, an injury that threatened his career. He joined the Challenge Tour in 2009 where he struggled in his rookie year. He improved in 2010, finishing 39th on the Order of Merit while recording a runner up finish at the Kärnten Golf Open. He picked up his first win in 2011 at the ECCO Tour Championship. He also recorded a runner up finish at the Saint-Omer Open.

== Professional wins (1) ==
=== Challenge Tour wins (1) ===
No.	Date	Tournament	Winning score	Margin of victory	Runner-up
1	20 Aug 2011	ECCO Tour Championship^{1}	−8 (73-66-69=208) (Note: Shortened to 54 holes due to weather.)	1 stroke	(France) Charles-Édouard Russo

^{1}Co-sanctioned by the Danish Golf Tour

== Results in major championships ==
Tournament	2006
The Open Championship	CUT

Note: Denison only played in The Open Championship.
CUT = missed the half-way cut

== Team appearances ==
Amateur

- Jacques Léglise Trophy (representing Great Britain and Ireland): 2003 (winners)

== See also ==
- 2011 Challenge Tour graduates
