= Floris de Vries =

Dutch professional golfer (born 1989)

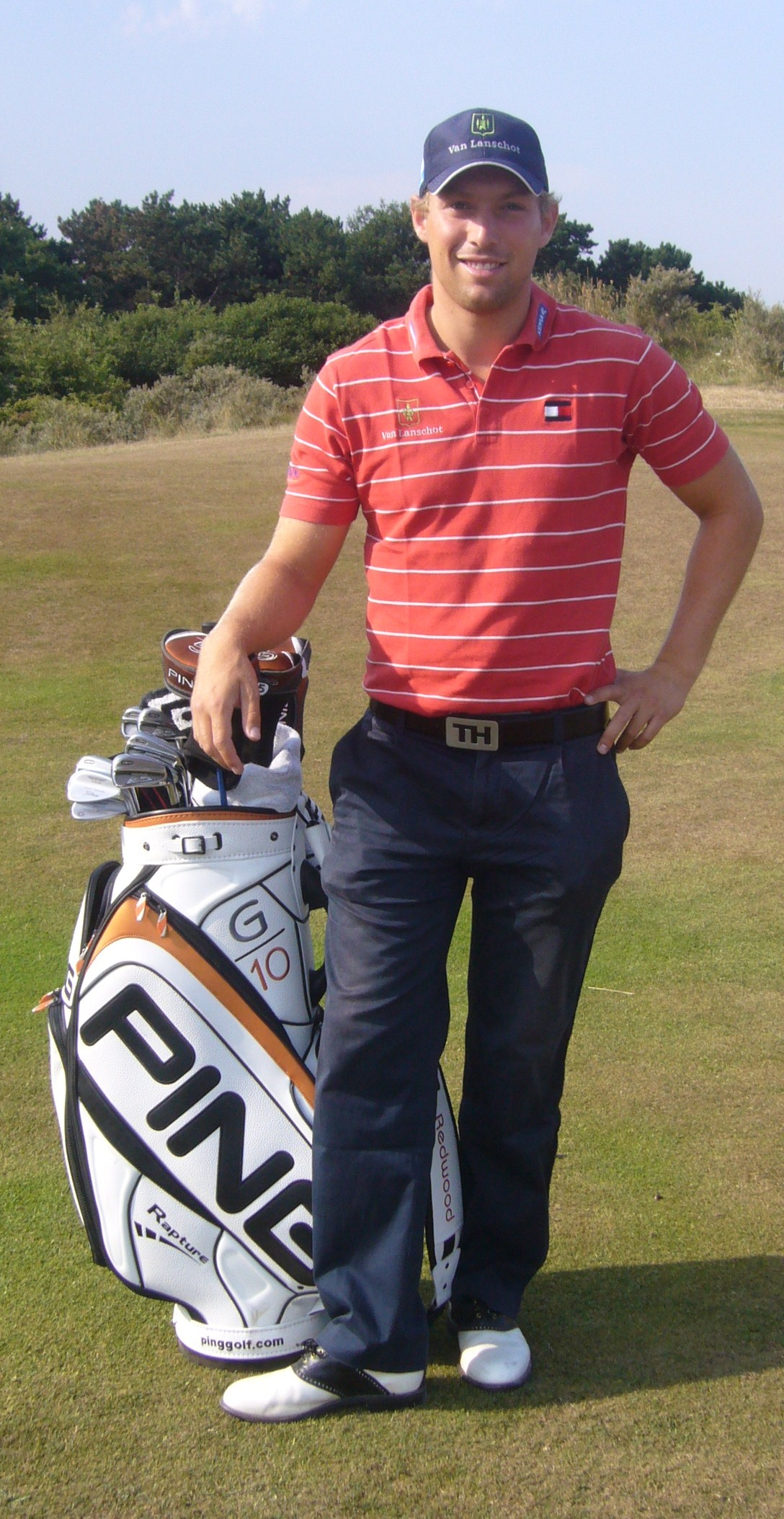

Personal information
- Full name: Floris Jan Willem de Vries
- Nationality: Netherlands
- Born: 18 August 1989 (age 37) Rheden, Netherlands
- Height: 1.85 m (6 ft 1 in)

Career
- Sport: Golf
- Turned professional: 2009
- Former tours: European Tour; Challenge Tour; Pro Golf Tour
- Professional wins: 3

Number of wins by tour
- Challenge Tour: 1
- Other: 2

Best results in major championships
- Masters Tournament: DNP
- PGA Championship: DNP
- U.S. Open: DNP
- The Open Championship: T48: 2011

Floris Jan Willem de Vries (born 18 August 1989) is a Dutch professional golfer.

== Career ==
De Vries was born in Rheden and turned professional in 2009, having had a successful amateur career. He qualified for the Challenge Tour by finishing in the top five of the rankings on the EPD Tour, one of Europe's third-tier development tours, in 2009.

In his rookie season on the Challenge Tour De Vries won the Mugello Tuscany Open, defeating Thorbjørn Olesen in a sudden-death playoff. He ended the season in 4th place on the Challenge Tour Rankings to graduate to the top level European Tour for 2011.

De Vries finished his professional playing career in 2014 at the Deutsche Bank Polish Masters Pro Golf Tour Championship on the Pro Golf Tour. He capped his career off with a victory.

== Amateur wins ==
- 2005 European Young Masters
- 2006 French International Boys Championship
- 2007 Dutch Amateur Open Championship
- 2008 Dutch Amateur Open Championship

== Professional wins (3) ==
=== Challenge Tour wins (1) ===
No.	Date	Tournament	Winning score	Margin of victory	Runner-up
1	23 May 2010	Mugello Tuscany Open	−10 (67-68-71-68=274)	Playoff	(Denmark) Thorbjørn Olesen

Challenge Tour playoff record (1–0)

No.	Year	Tournament	Opponent	Result
1	2010	Mugello Tuscany Open	(Denmark) Thorbjørn Olesen	Won with a birdie on the second extra hole

=== Pro Golf Tour wins (2) ===
No.	Date	Tournament	Winning score	Margin of victory	Runners-up
1	24 Jun 2009	Bohemia Franzensbad Classic	−10 (72-70-67=209)	9 strokes	(Netherlands) Richard Kind, (Czech Republic) Marek Nový
2	26 Sep 2014	Deutsche Bank Polish Masters Pro Golf Tour Championship	−4 (69-69-71=209)	1 stroke	(Germany) Stephan Gross, (Germany) Anton Kirstein, (Germany) Marcel Schneider

== Team appearances ==
Amateur

- European Boys' Team Championship (representing the Netherlands): 2003, 2004, 2005 (winners), 2007
- European Youths' Team Championship (representing the Netherlands): 2006
- Jacques Léglise Trophy (representing Continental Europe): 2005 (winners), 2007
- Eisenhower Trophy (representing the Netherlands): 2008
- European Amateur Team Championship (representing the Netherlands): 2008

== See also ==
- 2010 Challenge Tour graduates
