= Magnus A. Carlsson =

Swedish golfer

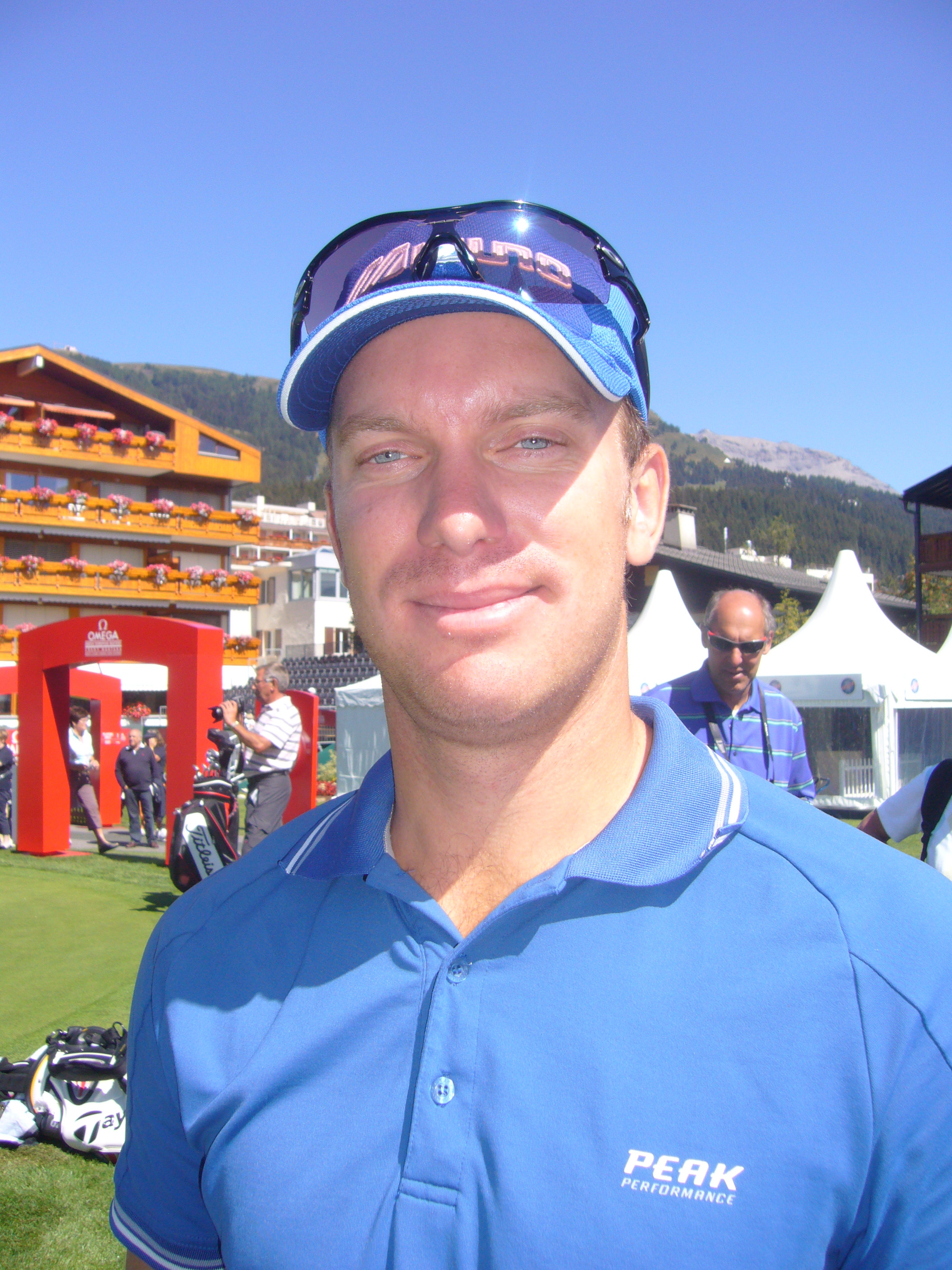

Personal information
- Full name: Magnus A. Carlsson
- Nationality: Sweden
- Born: 21 August 1980 (age 46) Västerås, Sweden
- Height: 5 ft 11 in (1.80 m)
- Weight: 176 lb (80 kg; 12.6 st)

Career
- Sport: Golf
- Turned professional: 2001
- Current tour: Challenge Tour
- Former tour: European Tour
- Professional wins: 3

Number of wins by tour
- Challenge Tour: 1
- Other: 2

Achievements and awards
- Swedish Golf Tour Order of Merit winner: 2004

Magnus A. Carlsson (born 21 August 1980) is a Swedish professional golfer.

== Career ==
Carlsson was born in Västerås, Sweden. He turned professional in 2001.

Carlsson played on the Challenge Tour from 2003 to 2007. He secured his first ever professional win in 2007 at the Challenge of Ireland. He went on to finish seventh in the Challenge Tour Order of Merit that same year, ensuring he would play on the European Tour in 2008.

In his debut season on the European Tour, Carlsson was edged out in a playoff at the Joburg Open by Richard Sterne. He returned to the Challenge Tour in 2010, and again in 2012 and successfully regained his European Tour playing rights each time.

== Professional wins (3) ==
=== Challenge Tour wins (1) ===
No.	Date	Tournament	Winning score	Margin of victory	Runners-up
1	5 Aug 2007	Challenge of Ireland	−10 (69-70-69-70=278)	1 stroke	(France) Mike Lorenzo-Vera, (Argentina) Julio Zapata

=== Nordic Golf League wins (2) ===
No.	Date	Tournament	Winning score	Margin of victory	Runner-up
1	6 Jun 2004	Kinnaborg Open	−12 (66-67-65=198)	2 strokes	(Sweden) Björn Bäck
2	3 Jul 2004	SM Match	3 and 2		(Sweden) Per Larsson (a)

== Playoff record ==
European Tour playoff record (0–1)

No.	Year	Tournament	Opponents	Result
1	2008	Joburg Open	(South Africa) Garth Mulroy, (South Africa) Richard Sterne	Sterne won with birdie on second extra hole

== See also ==
- 2007 Challenge Tour graduates
- 2010 Challenge Tour graduates
- 2012 Challenge Tour graduates
