= Open des Volcans =

AGF-Allianz Open des Volcans – Challenge de France
Tournament information
- Location: Clermont Ferrand, France
- Established: 1992
- Course: Golf des Volcans
- Par: 71
- Length: 7,069 yards (6,464 m)
- Tour: Challenge Tour
- Format: Stroke play
- Prize fund: €130,000
- Month played: July
- Final year: 2007

Tournament record score
- Aggregate: 270 Scott Kammann (2002)
- To par: −18 as above

Final champion
- (New Zealand) Gareth Paddison
- Location in France Location in Auvergne-Rhône-Alpes

The Open des Volcans was a golf tournament on the Challenge Tour, played in France. It ran annually from 1992 to 2007 and was always played at the Golf des Volcans.

== Winners ==
Year	Winner	Score	To par	Margin of victory	Runner(s)-up
AGF-Allianz Open des Volcans – Challenge de France
2007	(New Zealand) Gareth Paddison	273	−11	6 strokes	(Sweden) Leif Westerberg
Open des Volcans – Challenge de France
2006	(Germany) Martin Kaymer	271	−13	6 strokes	(France) Mike Lorenzo-Vera
2005	(France) Ilya Goroneskoul	271	−13	2 strokes	(England) Andrew Butterfield (Argentina) Ariel Cañete (France) Nicolas Joakimedes
2004	(Sweden) Johan Axgren	280	−4	1 stroke	(England) Richard Bland
2003	(Spain) Ivó Giner	269	−15	3 strokes	(Scotland) David Patrick
Open des Volcans
2002	(United States) Scott Kammann	270	−14	1 stroke	(Belgium) Nicolas Colsaerts
2001	(Scotland) Scott Drummond	271	−17	1 stroke	(France) Marc Pendariès
2000	(France) Renaud Guillard	272	−16	1 stroke	(France) Christian Cévaër (England) Gary Clark (Venezuela) Carlos Larraín
1999	(England) Philip Golding	270	−18	2 strokes	(New Zealand) Stephen Scahill
1998	(England) Warren Bennett	277	−11	3 strokes	(Netherlands) Robert-Jan Derksen (France) Grégory Havret (a) (Scotland) Euan Little
1997	(Wales) Mark Litton	276	−12	Playoff	(Spain) José Manuel Carriles
1996	(England) Andrew Sandywell	205	−11	3 strokes	(Spain) Fredrik Andersson (Sweden) Adam Mednick
1995	(Germany) Thomas Gögele	274	−14	1 stroke	(Netherlands) Rolf Muntz (Sweden) Per Nyman
1994	(France) Éric Giraud	273	−15	Playoff	(Switzerland) Paolo Quirici
1993	(Sweden) Dennis Edlund	276	−12	1 stroke	(Spain) Ignacio Gervás (Sweden) Peter Hedblom
1992	(Sweden) Mikael Krantz	277	−11	Playoff	(England) Craig Cassells (England) Jeremy Robinson (United States) Ronald Stelten
