= Thomas Gögele =

German professional golfer (born 1970)

Personal information
- Nationality: Germany
- Born: 17 November 1970 (age 55) Hamburg, West Germany
- Height: 185 cm (6 ft 1 in)

Career
- Sport: Golf
- Turned professional: 1986
- Current tour: European Senior Tour
- Former tours: European Tour; Challenge Tour
- Professional wins: 5

Number of wins by tour
- Challenge Tour: 1
- European Senior Tour: 1
- Other: 3

Best results in major championships
- Masters Tournament: DNP
- PGA Championship: DNP
- U.S. Open: DNP
- The Open Championship: CUT: 1997

Thomas Gögele (born 17 November 1970) is a German professional golfer who played on the European Tour 1993–2001 and now plays on the European Senior Tour, where he won the 2024 Senior Italian Open.

== Early life ==
Gögele's father and grandfather were both golf pros, and his father played on the European Tour in the 1970s before becoming a club professional. Gögele started playing golf at the age of five, and learned the game at Augsburg Golf Club in Bavaria, like Bernhard Langer.

== Professional career ==
Gögele turned professional in 1986, aged 15. In 1991, he won the Interlaken Open in Switzerland. He went to Q-School nine times and won a card in 1992 and 1995, and played on the European Tour 1993-1994 and 1996-2001. 1995 he spent on the Challenge Tour, where he won the Open des Volcans in France.

In 1996, he was runner-up at the Volvo German Open, behind Ian Woosnam. 1998 would be his best year on tour, he finished solo 3rd at the BMW International Open, and 46th in the season rankings.

He represented Germany at the World Cup of Golf twice, in 1998 with Sven Strüver and in 2000 with Alex Čejka. He played in the 2000 Alfred Dunhill Cup at the Old Course at St Andrews alongside Sven Strüver and Bernhard Langer.

Gögele joined the European Senior Tour in 2021, and he won the 2024 Sergio Melpignano Senior Italian Open. He made the cut at the 2024 Senior Open Championship.

== Professional wins (5) ==
=== Challenge Tour wins (1) ===
No.	Date	Tournament	Winning score	Margin of victory	Runners-up
1	15 Jul 1995	Open des Volcans	−14 (72-67-67-68=274)	1 stroke	(Netherlands) Rolf Muntz, (Sweden) Per Nyman

=== German wins (2) ===
- 1999 German PGA Championship
- 2000 German PGA Championship

=== Other wins (1) ===
No.	Date	Tournament	Winning score	Margin of victory	Runner-up
1	29 Jul 1991	Interlaken Open	−6 (138)	2 strokes	(England) Joe Higgins

=== European Senior Tour wins (1) ===
No.	Date	Tournament	Winning score	Margin of victory	Runner-up
1	26 Oct 2024	Sergio Melpignano Senior Italian Open	−19 (64-66-67=197)	3 strokes	(Wales) Bradley Dredge

== Results in major championships ==
Note: Gögele only played in The Open Championship.

Tournament	1997
The Open Championship	CUT

CUT = missed the halfway cut

== Team appearances ==
Professional

- World Cup (representing Germany): 1998, 2000
- Alfred Dunhill Cup (representing Germany): 1996, 1997, 1998, 2000
