= Eulen Open Galea =

Tournament information
- Location: Bilbao, Spain
- Established: 1995
- Course: R.S.G. de Neguri
- Par: 72
- Tour: Challenge Tour
- Format: Stroke play
- Prize fund: £60,000
- Month played: May
- Final year: 1998

Tournament record score
- Aggregate: 271 Warren Bennett (1997)
- To par: −17 as above

Final champion
- (Spain) Álvaro Salto
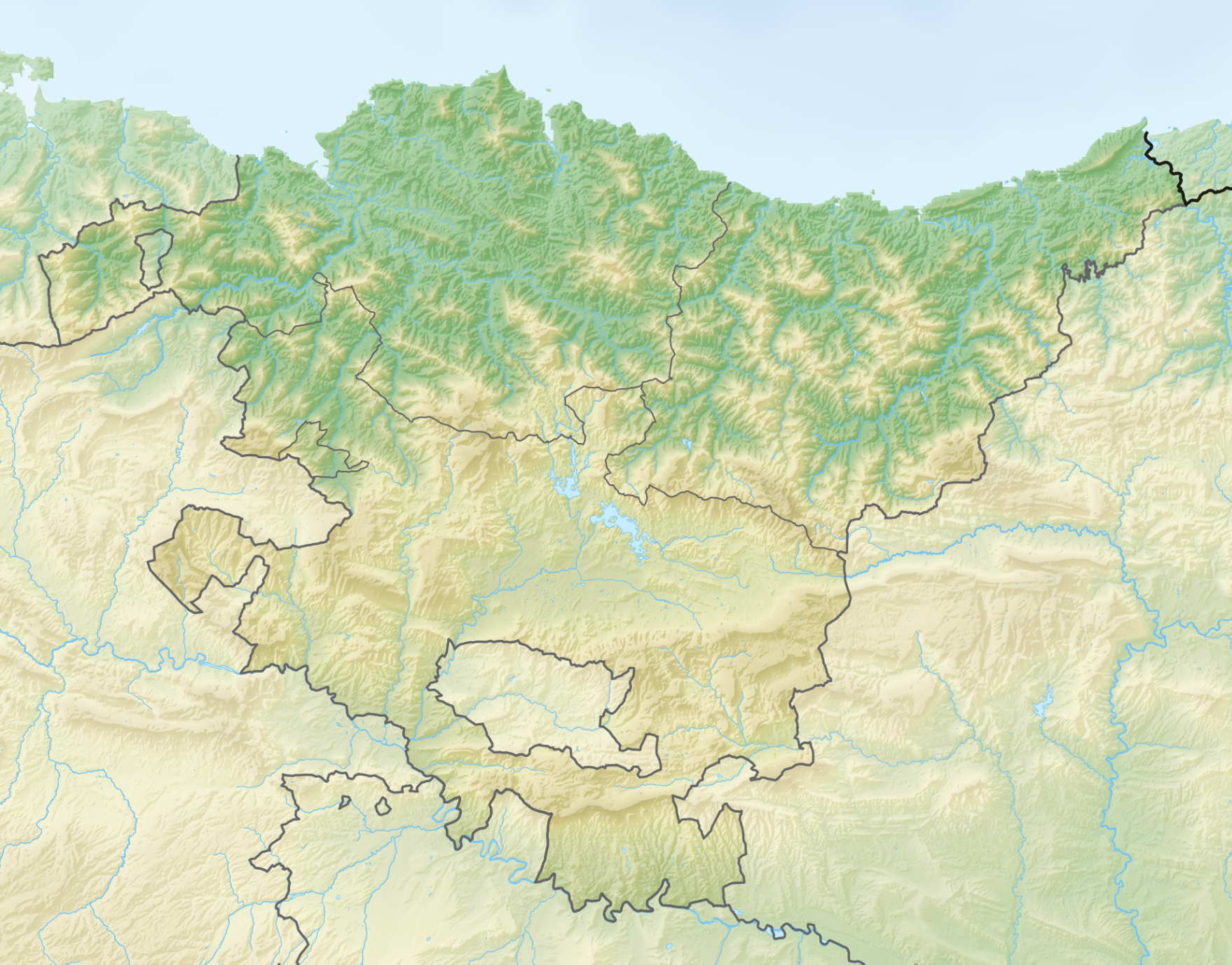
- Location in Spain Location in the Basque Country

The Eulen Open Galea was a golf tournament on the Challenge Tour that was played at R.S.G. de Neguri in Bilbao, Spain from 1995 to 1998.

== Winners ==
Year	Winner	Score	To par	Margin of victory	Runner(s)-up	Ref.
1998	(Spain) Álvaro Salto	280	−8	1 stroke	(England) Daren Lee	
1997	(England) Warren Bennett	271	−17	9 strokes	(France) Nicolas Joakimides (Australia) Stephen Leaney (France) Antoine Lebouc (Spain) Tomás Jesús Muñoz (Sweden) Per Nyman (Spain) Juan Quirós	
1996	(Spain) José Antonio Sota	279	−9	4 strokes	(Spain) Ignacio Feliu (Sweden) Freddie Jacobson (England) Robert Lee (New Zealand) Stephen Scahill	
1995	(Denmark) Ben Tinning	281	−7	1 stroke	(Spain) Diego Borrego (Finland) Kalle Vainola	
