= 1995 Swedish Golf Tour =

Golf tour season

1995 Swedish Golf Tour season
- Duration: 25 May 1995 – 17 September 1995
- Number of official events: 13
- Order of Merit: (England) Stephen Field

The 1995 Swedish Golf Tour, titled as the 1995 Scandinavian Golf Tour, was the 12th season of the Swedish Golf Tour, the main professional golf tour in Sweden since it was formed in 1984, with most tournaments being incorporated into the Challenge Tour between 1989 and 1998.

== Schedule ==
The following table lists official events during the 1995 season.

Date	Tournament	Location	Purse (SKr)	Winner (Note: The number in brackets after each winner's name is the number of Swedish Golf Tour events they had won up to and including that tournament. As most Swedish Golf Tour events are incorporated into the Challenge Tour schedules, details of these wins are displayed there instead.)	Main tour (Note: CHA − Challenge Tour.)
28 May	Compaq Open	Skåne	350,000	(Sweden) Dennis Edlund	CHA
4 Jun	SIAB Open	Skåne	350,000	(Finland) Anssi Kankkonen	CHA
11 Jun	Himmerland Open	Denmark	350,000	(Denmark) Thomas Bjørn	CHA
18 Jun	Husqvarna Open	Småland	150,000	(Sweden) Per Nyman (1)	
25 Jun	Team Erhverv Danish Open	Denmark	640,000	(England) Rob Edwards	CHA
9 Jul	Volvo Finnish Open	Finland	350,000	(Sweden) Fredrik Plan	CHA
30 Jul	Karsten Ping Norwegian Open	Norway	700,000	(England) Stephen Field	CHA
6 Aug	Västerås Open	Västmanland	150,000	(Sweden) Lars Tingvall (2)	
13 Aug	SM Match Play	Västerbotten	350,000	(Sweden) Peter Thörn	CHA
20 Aug	Toyota Danish PGA Championship	Denmark	350,000	(France) François Lamare	CHA
27 Aug	Gefle Open	Gästrikland	100,000	(Sweden) Daniel Fornstam (1)	
10 Sep	Borås Open	Västergötland	150,000	(Sweden) Mårten Olander (1)	
17 Sep	Kentab Open	Västmanland	350,000	(Sweden) Per Nyman	CHA

== Order of Merit ==
The Order of Merit was based on prize money won during the season, calculated in Swedish krona.

Position	Player	Prize money (SKr)
1	(England) Stephen Field	143,499
2	(Sweden) Per Nyman	141,656
3	(Denmark) Thomas Bjørn	125,974
4	(Sweden) Dennis Edlund	108,507
5	(Sweden) Magnus Persson	106,840

== See also ==
- 1995 Swedish Golf Tour (women)
