= Stuart Little (golfer) =

English golfer (born 1967)

Personal information
- Nationality: England
- Born: 1 August 1967 (age 59) Chelmsford, England
- Height: 6 ft 2 in (1.88 m)

Career
- Sport: Golf
- Turned professional: 1992
- Current tour: European Senior Tour (joined 2019)
- Former tours: European Tour (joined 1992); Challenge Tour (joined 1994)
- Professional wins: 2

Number of wins by tour
- Challenge Tour: 2

Best results in major championships
- Masters Tournament: DNP
- PGA Championship: DNP
- U.S. Open: DNP
- The Open Championship: CUT: 2000

Stuart Little (born 1 August 1967) is an English professional golfer who played on the European Tour.

== Career ==
A left-handed golfer, Little qualified for the European Tour through Qualifying School in 1991 and 1992 and 2004 – and twice through the Challenge Tour – in 2001 and 2003.

=== Challenge Tour ===
After the 1991 and 1992 seasons where he both finished ranked 148th, he dropped down to the Challenge Tour, where he won the Rolex Trophy at Golf Club de Geneve in Switzerland twice, in 1994 and 2001. He was also runner-up at the 1994 Challenge Chargeurs, 2001 Open Golf Montecchia - PGA Triveneta, 2001 Zambia Open and lost a playoff at 2000 Norwegian Challenge.

Little finished 14th in the 2001 Challenge Tour rankings to get promoted back up to the European Tour. However, he failed to make an impact on the 2002 European Tour and found himself back on the 2003 Challenge Tour, where he was runner-up behind Darren Clarke at the Northern Ireland Masters, a one-off tournament played in September 2003 at Clandeboye Golf Club in Newtownards, Northern Ireland.

Finishing a career best of 8th in the 2003 Challenge Tour rankings, he was back on the European Tour 2004. To stay there in 2005 he had to come through the Qualifying School process, which he did by first finishing in a share of fourth place at Oliva Nova in stage two and then taking the 28th card available from the Final Stage at San Roque after six consistent rounds in the 70s.

=== European Tour ===
The 2005 European Tour was his most successful season. He was runner-up at the Abama Open de Canarias, the last of four dual ranking events on the European and Challenge Tours that year. He also finished top-10 at the BMW Asian Open, Omega European Masters and Telecom Italia Open, and rose to around 250 on the Official World Golf Ranking. He ended the season 63rd on the Order of Merit, 55 places above his previous best position. Little credited his improvement to a decision early in 2005 to switch to a new coach in Gary Nicol and sports psychologist Dr Karl Morris.

2006 and 2007 saw only one top-10, at the 2007 Open de España. Retiring from tour after the 2007 season with € 1,122,724 in career earnings, he represented Great Britain and Ireland at the 2011 PGA Cup.

=== European Senior Tour ===
Little joined the qualifying school played in Portugal in late January 2019. First there was a 36-hole stage one event from which Little advanced, joining other leading players and a number of exempt players in the 72-hole final stage. There were just five qualifying places available for the 2019 season, but Little beat Peter Wilson with a birdie at the second playoff hole to secure the fifth and last place on the 2019 European Senior Tour.

== Professional wins (2) ==
=== Challenge Tour wins (2) ===
| No. | Date | Tournament | Winning score | Margin of victory | Runner-up |
|---|---|---|---|---|---|
| 1 | 6 Aug 1994 | Rolex Pro-Am | −19 (67-70-65-67=269) | 2 strokes | (Sweden) Mats Hallberg |
| 2 | 26 Aug 2001 | Rolex Trophy (2) | −17 (66-67-69-69=271) | 2 strokes | (Switzerland) André Bossert |

Challenge Tour playoff record (0–1)

| No. | Year | Tournament | Opponents | Result |
|---|---|---|---|---|
| 1 | 2000 | Norwegian Open | (Sweden) Per Larsson, (Sweden) Paul Nilbrink | Nilbrink won with birdie on second extra hole Little eliminated by par on first hole |

== Results in major championships ==
| Tournament | 2000 |
|---|---|
| The Open Championship | CUT |

CUT = missed the halfway cut
Note: Little only played in The Open Championship.

== Team appearances ==
- PGA Cup (representing Great Britain and Ireland): 2011
