= John Senden =

Australian professional golfer

Personal information
- Full name: John Gerard Senden
- Nationality: Australia
- Born: 20 April 1971 (age 55) Brisbane, Queensland, Australia
- Height: 6 ft 3 in (1.91 m)
- Weight: 193 lb (88 kg; 13.8 st)
- Spouse: Jackie Senden
- Children: 1

Career
- Sport: Golf
- Turned professional: 1992
- Current tours: PGA Tour; PGA Tour of Australasia
- Former tours: European Tour; Asian Tour
- Professional wins: 6
- Highest ranking: 28 (11 March 2012)

Number of wins by tour
- PGA Tour: 2
- PGA Tour of Australasia: 1
- Challenge Tour: 2
- Other: 1

Best results in major championships
- Masters Tournament: T8: 2014
- PGA Championship: T4: 2007
- U.S. Open: T10: 2012
- The Open Championship: T34: 2012

John Gerard Senden (born 20 April 1971) is an Australian professional golfer who plays on the PGA Tour.

== Career ==
Senden was born in Brisbane, Queensland and turned pro in 1992. Senden has played all over the world. He is a regular competitor on the PGA Tour of Australasia and has spent time playing in Asia. In Europe he won twice on the second tier Challenge Tour in 1998 and was a member of the main European Tour from 1999 to 2001.

In 2002, Senden joined the PGA Tour in the United States, after coming through the qualifying school in 2001. During his first year on tour he successfully kept his playing status with eight top-25 finishes in 30 events. He claimed his first PGA Tour title on 16 July 2006 at the John Deere Classic, a one-shot victory over American J. P. Hayes. Later in 2006 he won his national open for the first time. In 2007, he was the leading Australian at the PGA Championship which was won by Tiger Woods and reached the top 50 of the Official World Golf Ranking.

In March 2014, Senden won his second PGA Tour title (and first in eight years) at the Valspar Championship by one stroke over Kevin Na. In the final round, he came from two strokes back to shoot a one-under 70 to seal victory. The win qualified Senden for the 2014 Masters Tournament where he finished T-8.

Senden's son was diagnosed with a brain tumor in April 2017. Senden played the next two seasons using a Major Medical Extension under the family crisis provision, but he was unable to meet the terms and was demoted to the Past Champions Category. He played the 2019–20 season using an exemption for those who made 300 PGA Tour cuts.

== Professional wins (6) ==
=== PGA Tour wins (2) ===
No.	Date	Tournament	Winning score	Margin of victory	Runner-up
1	16 Jul 2006	John Deere Classic	−19 (64-69-64-68=265)	1 stroke	(United States) J. P. Hayes
2	16 Mar 2014	Valspar Championship	−7 (72-71-64-70=277)	1 stroke	(United States) Kevin Na

=== Asia Golf Circuit wins (1) ===
No.	Date	Tournament	Winning score	Margin of victory	Runner-up
1	25 Nov 1995	Tugu Pratama Indonesian PGA Championship	−9 (69-67-71-72=279)	2 strokes	(Philippines) Felix Casas

=== PGA Tour of Australasia wins (1) ===
Legend
Flagship events (1)
Other PGA Tour of Australasia (0)

No.	Date	Tournament	Winning score	Margin of victory	Runner-up
1	19 Nov 2006	MFS Australian Open	−8 (76-72-67-65=280)	1 stroke	(Australia) Geoff Ogilvy

=== Challenge Tour wins (2) ===
No.	Date	Tournament	Winning score	Margin of victory	Runner(s)-up
1	26 Jul 1998	Interlaken Open	−25 (67-69-65-62=263)	2 strokes	(England) Warren Bennett, (Scotland) Stephen Gallacher
2	6 Sep 1998	Open de Strasbourg	−12 (71-70-67-68=276)	Playoff	(England) Daren Lee

Challenge Tour playoff record (1–1)

No.	Year	Tournament	Opponent	Result
1	1998	Open dei Tessali	(Sweden) Pehr Magnebrant	
2	1998	Open de Strasbourg	(England) Daren Lee	Won with birdie on first extra hole

== Playoff record ==
Asian PGA Tour playoff record (0–1)

No.	Year	Tournament	Opponent	Result
1	1997	London Myanmar Open	(Thailand) Boonchu Ruangkit	Lost to birdie on first extra hole

== Results in major championships ==
Tournament	2002	2003	2004	2005	2006	2007	2008	2009
Masters Tournament							CUT	
U.S. Open			CUT					
The Open Championship	CUT				T35	T45		CUT
PGA Championship					CUT	T4	T42	CUT

Tournament	2010	2011	2012	2013	2014	2015	2016
Masters Tournament	CUT		CUT	T35	T8	T38	
U.S. Open	CUT	T30	T10	T15	CUT	T14	
The Open Championship	T48		T34	CUT	T58	T40	
PGA Championship	CUT	T19	T32	T70	CUT	CUT	T18

Top 10
Did not play

CUT = missed the halfway cut
"T" indicates a tie for a place.

=== Summary ===
Tournament	Wins	2nd	3rd	Top-5	Top-10	Top-25	Events	Cuts made
Masters Tournament	0	0	0	0	1	1	6	3
U.S. Open	0	0	0	0	1	3	7	4
The Open Championship	0	0	0	0	0	0	9	6
PGA Championship	0	0	0	1	1	3	11	6
Totals	0	0	0	1	3	7	33	19

- Most consecutive cuts made – 5 (2012 U.S. Open – 2013 U.S. Open)
- Longest streak of top-10s – 1 (three times)

== Results in The Players Championship ==
Tournament	2003	2004	2005	2006	2007	2008	2009
The Players Championship	CUT	T58	T22	CUT	T52	CUT	T37

Tournament	2010	2011	2012	2013	2014	2015	2016
The Players Championship	CUT	CUT	CUT	T43	T26	T8	CUT

Top 10

CUT = missed the halfway cut
"T" indicates a tie for a place

== Results in World Golf Championships ==
Results not in chronological order prior to 2015.

Tournament	2007	2008	2009	2010	2011	2012	2013	2014	2015
Championship				T11		T6	T20		T31
Match Play		R64				R16	R64		QF
Invitational	45					T16		T26	
Champions					19	T28		T35	

Top 10
Did not play

QF, R16, R32, R64 = Round in which player lost in match play
"T" = Tied
Note that the HSBC Champions did not become a WGC event until 2009.

== Results in senior major championships ==
Results not in chronological order

Tournament	2021	2022	2023	2024	2025	2026
Senior PGA Championship	CUT	CUT		DQ		
The Tradition	T29	72	56	T52	74	75
U.S. Senior Open		T51				
Senior Players Championship	T42	T55	T53	T56	T74	
Senior British Open Championship		T47	CUT	T37		

Did not play

CUT = missed the halfway cut
DQ = disqualified
"T" indicates a tie for a place

== Team appearances ==
World Cup (representing Australia): 2006

== See also ==
- 2001 PGA Tour Qualifying School graduates
