= Tunisian Challenge =

Golf tournament

Tunisian Open Challenge
Tournament information
- Location: Tabarka, Tunisia
- Established: 1994
- Course: Tabarka Golf Club
- Par: 72
- Tour: Challenge Tour
- Format: Stroke play
- Prize fund: £70,000
- Month played: October
- Final year: 1995

Tournament record score
- Aggregate: 281 Jon Robson
- To par: −7 as above

Final champion
- (England) Ricky Willison

Location map
- Location in Tunisia

The Tunisian Challenge was a golf tournament on the Challenge Tour, held in Tunisia in 1994 and 1995. The tournament was the only leading golf event held in Tunisia between the 1985 Tunisian Open on the European Tour and the 2015 Tunisian Golf Open on the Alps Tour, aside from the Tunisian Seniors Open.

== Winners ==
Year	Winner	Score	To par	Margin of victory	Runners-up	Ref.
Tunisian Open Challenge
1995	(England) Ricky Willison	283	−5	2 strokes	(England) Simon D. Hurley (France) Tim Planchin	
Tunisian Challenge
1994	(England) Jon Robson	281	−7	3 strokes	(Spain) Jesús María Arruti (Sweden) Daniel Chopra	

== See also ==
- Tunisian Open
- Tunisian Seniors Open
