= Dutch Challenge Open =

Fortis Challenge Open
Tournament information
- Location: Purmerend, Netherlands
- Established: 1992
- Course: BurgGolf Purmerend
- Par: 72
- Length: 6,697 yards (6,124 m)
- Tour: Challenge Tour
- Format: Stroke play
- Prize fund: €135,000
- Month played: May
- Final year: 2003

Tournament record score
- Aggregate: 261 Dominique Nouailhac (2001)
- To par: −19 as above

Final champion
- (Sweden) Johan Edfors
- Location in the Netherlands

The Dutch Challenge Open was a golf tournament on the Challenge Tour. It was played annually in the Netherlands from 1992 to 2003, except for 1993, 1998 and 1999.

== Winners ==
Year	Winner	Score	To par	Margin of victory	Runner(s)-up	Venue
Fortis Challenge Open
2003	(Sweden) Johan Edfors	273	−15	2 strokes	(Sweden) Kalle Brink	BurgGolf Purmerend
Fortis Bank Challenge Open
2002	(Belgium) Didier de Vooght	270	−18	2 strokes	(Spain) Jesús María Arruti (Netherlands) Robert-Jan Derksen (Sweden) Peter Gustafsson (Republic of Ireland) Peter Lawrie (Sweden) Fredrik Widmark	Het Rijk van Nijmegen
Muermans Real Estate Challenge
2001	(France) Dominique Nouailhac	261	−19	4 strokes	(Sweden) Tony Edlund	Herkenbosch
Muermans Real Estate Challenge Open
2000	(France) Richard Gillot	281	−7	1 stroke	(England) Andrew Raitt	Herkenbosch
Steelcover Dutch Challenge
1998–99: No tournament
1997	(France) Raphaël Jacquelin	277	−11	3 strokes	(England) Andrew Butterfield (Australia) Mathew Goggin (England) Roger Winchester	Broekpolder
Dutch Challenge
1996	(Australia) Mathew Goggin	274	−14	2 strokes	(Belgium) Nicolas Vanhootegem	Broekpolder
Steelcover Dutch Challenge Open
1995	(England) Warren Bennett	276	−12	Playoff	(Spain) Francisco Valera	Broekpolder
Dutch Challenge Open
1994	(France) Jean-François Remésy	274	−14	3 strokes	(England) John Bickerton (Sweden) Dennis Edlund (France) Antoine Lebouc	Het Rijk van Nijmegen
1993: No tournament
1992	(England) John Coe	277	−11	1 stroke	(England) Paul Eales (Sweden) Jan Tilmanis	Purmer
