= Lomas Bosque Challenge =

Tournament information
- Location: Madrid, Spain
- Established: 1995
- Course: Lomas Bosque Golf Club
- Par: 72
- Tour: Challenge Tour
- Format: Stroke play
- Prize fund: £30,000
- Month played: September
- Final year: 1995

Tournament record score
- Aggregate: 272 Per Nyman (1998)
- To par: −16 as above

Final champion
- (Sweden) Per Nyman
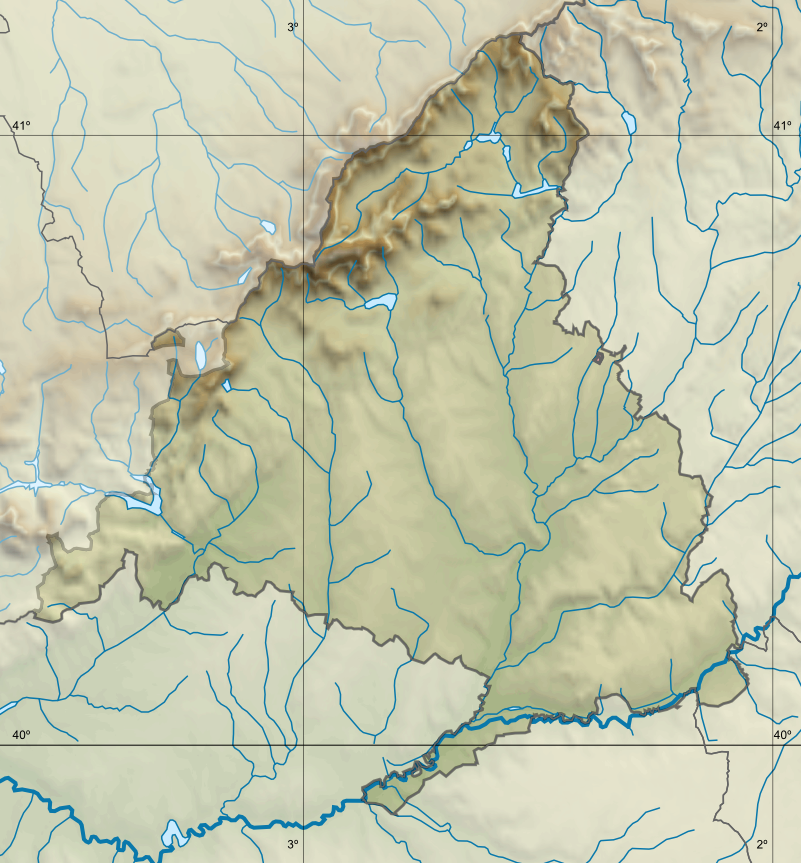
- Location in Spain Location in the Community of Madrid

The Lomas Bosque Challenge was a golf tournament on the Challenge Tour, played in Spain. It was held 1995 at Lomas Bosque GC in Madrid.

== Winners ==
Year	Winner	Score	To par	Margin of victory	Runners-up	Ref.
1995	(Sweden) Per Nyman	272	−16	4 strokes	(England) Simon D. Hurley (Spain) Manuel Moreno (Sweden) Raimo Sjöberg	
