= Interlaken Open =

Tournament information
- Location: Interlaken, Switzerland
- Established: 1989
- Course: Golfclub Interlaken-Unterseen
- Par: 72
- Tour: Challenge Tour
- Format: Stroke play
- Prize fund: £75,000
- Month played: July
- Final year: 1998

Tournament record score
- Aggregate: 263 John Senden (1998)
- To par: −25 as above

Final champion
- (Australia) John Senden

Location map
- Location in Switzerland

The Interlaken Open was a golf tournament on the Challenge Tour, held in Switzerland.

== History ==
It was first played on the Challenge Tour in 1993 and replaced in 2000 by the Swiss Challenge, following financial issues.

== Winners ==
Year	Tour (Note: CHA − Challenge Tour.)	Winner	Score	To par	Margin of victory	Runner-up	Ref.
1998	CHA	(Australia) John Senden	263	−25	2 strokes	(England) Warren Bennett	
1997	CHA	Abandoned (Note: Tournament abandoned after the first round due to rain.)					
1996	CHA	(England) Van Phillips	203	−13	1 stroke	(Sweden) Mårten Olander	
1995	CHA	(Denmark) Thomas Bjørn	200	−16	3 strokes	(Switzerland) André Bossert	
1994	CHA	(England) Neal Briggs	203	−13	Playoff	(Scotland) Raymond Russell	
1993	CHA	(England) Jamie Taylor	207	−9	1 stroke	(England) Daren Lee	
1992		(England) Joe Higgins	141	−3	2 strokes	(England) Neil Roderick	
1991		(Germany) Thomas Gögele	138	−6	2 strokes	(England) Joe Higgins	
1990		(England) David James	140	−4	1 stroke	(Switzerland) Paolo Quirici	
1989		(Italy) Pietro Molteni	141	−3	1 stroke	(Italy) Silvano Locatelli	
