= Challenge Tour Championship =

Golf tournament on the Challenge Tour

Charles Church European Challenge Tour Championship
Tournament information
- Location: Calne, Wiltshire, England
- Established: 1992
- Courses: Bowood Golf and Country Club
- Par: 72
- Length: 7,318 yards (6,692 m)
- Tour: Challenge Tour
- Format: Stroke play
- Prize fund: €250,000
- Month played: July
- Final year: 2002

Tournament record score
- Aggregate: 272 Carl Suneson (1999)
- To par: −16 as above

Final champion
- (England) John E. Morgan
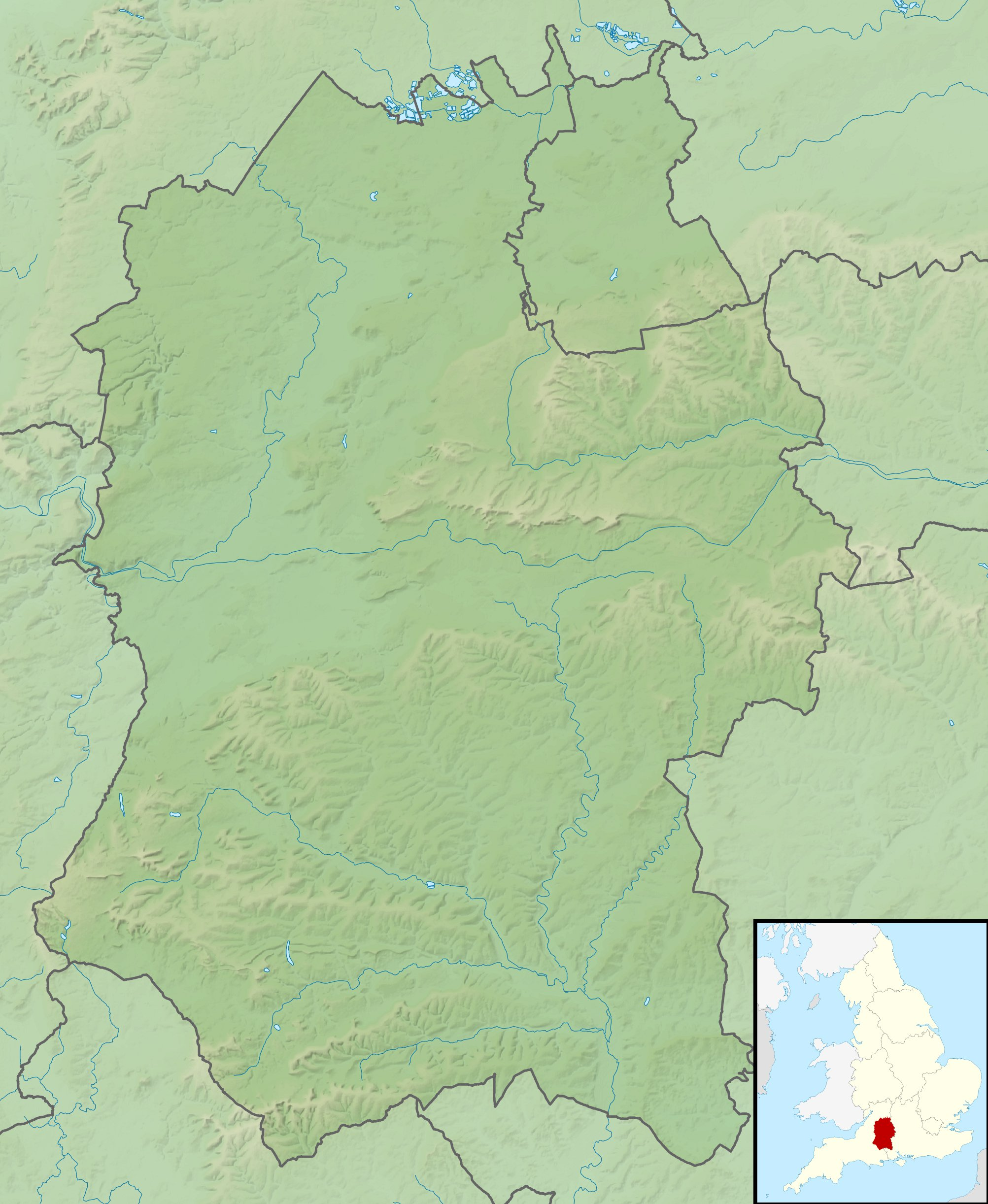
- Location in England Location in Wiltshire

The Challenge Tour Championship was a golf tournament on the Challenge Tour that was first played in 1992 as the East Sussex National Challenge. After a break of two years, it returned as the Coca-Cola Open, before being retitled as the Challenge Tour Championship in 1996.

== Winners ==
Year	Winner	Score	To par	Margin of victory	Runner(s)-up	Venue
Charles Church European Challenge Tour Championship
2002	(England) John E. Morgan	278	−10	Playoff	(England) David Geall	Bowood
2001	(England) Mark Foster	277	−11	2 strokes	(France) Sébastien Delagrange (England) Philip Golding	Bowood
Beazer Homes Challenge Tour Championship
2000	(England) Shaun P. Webster	282	−6	2 strokes	(Scotland) Graham Rankin	Bowood
1999	(Spain) Carl Suneson	272	−16	8 strokes	(Wales) Bradley Dredge (Netherlands) Maarten Lafeber (France) Benoît Teilleria	Bowood
Challenge Tour Championship
1998	(England) Warren Bennett	276	−12	2 strokes	(England) John Bickerton	East Sussex National
1997	(Australia) Greg Chalmers	274	−14	Playoff	(Germany) Heinz-Peter Thül	East Sussex National
English Challenge Tour Championship
1996	(Sweden) Dennis Edlund	282	−6	1 stroke	(England) Rob Edwards	East Sussex National
Coca-Cola Open
1995	(Denmark) Thomas Bjørn	280	−8	1 stroke	(Sweden) Freddie Jacobson	East Sussex National
East Sussex National Challenge
1993–94: No tournament
1992	(England) Simon D. Hurley	285	−3	Playoff	(South Africa) Retief Goosen	East Sussex National
