= KB Golf Challenge =

Tournament information
- Location: Prague, Czech Republic
- Established: 1995
- Course: Golf Club Praha
- Par: 72
- Tour: Challenge Tour
- Format: Stroke play
- Prize fund: £40,000
- Month played: June
- Final year: 1998

Tournament record score
- Aggregate: 270 Stephen Gallacher (1998)
- To par: −18 as above

Final champion
- (Scotland) Stephen Gallacher
- Location in the Czech Republic

The KB Golf Challenge was a golf tournament on the Challenge Tour, played in the Czech Republic. It was held 1995 to 1998, at Praha Karlstein in Prague.

== Winners ==
Year	Winner	Score	To par	Margin of victory	Runner-up	Ref.
1998	(Scotland) Stephen Gallacher	270	−18	2 strokes	(Germany) Erol Şimşek	
1997	(Germany) Alex Čejka	271	−17	2 strokes	(Italy) Michele Reale	
1996	(Sweden) Joakim Rask	271	−17	1 stroke	(England) Greg Owen	
1995	(France) Éric Giraud	279	−9	3 strokes	(England) Ian Garbutt	
