= Rolex Trophy =

Golf tournament in Switzerland

Tournament information
- Location: Geneva, Switzerland
- Established: 1989
- Course: Golf Club de Genève
- Par: 72
- Length: 6,821 yards (6,237 m)
- Tour: Challenge Tour
- Format: Stroke play
- Prize fund: €290,000
- Month played: August
- Final year: 2019

Tournament record score
- Aggregate: 261 Kristoffer Broberg (2012)
- To par: −27 as above

Final champion
- (Netherlands) Darius van Driel
- Location in Switzerland

The Rolex Trophy was a golf tournament on the Challenge Tour, that is played in Geneva, Switzerland. It was played annually on the Challenge Tour since 1989.

Unlike many Challenge Tour events, the Rolex Trophy has been played at the same venue, the Golf Club de Genève, every year.

It is a limited field Pro-Am event. It used to feature the top 32 in the tour rankings plus four invitees, but the number of players has more recently been 42. One unusual feature was that only the prize money of the top 20 players counted towards their Challenge Tour rankings, although all entrants receive prize money.

== Winners ==
Year	Winner	Score	To par	Margin of victory	Runner(s)-up	Ref.
Rolex Trophy
2021	Removed from the schedule					
2020	Cancelled due to COVID-19 pandemic					
2019	(Netherlands) Darius van Driel	265	−23	1 stroke	(Northern Ireland) Cormac Sharvin	
2018	(Finland) Kim Koivu	266	−22	6 strokes	(Germany) Marcel Schneider	
2017	(Spain) Pedro Oriol	271	−17	Playoff	(France) Adrien Saddier	
2016	(South Africa) Dylan Frittelli	268	−20	2 strokes	(Spain) Pep Anglès (New Zealand) Ryan Fox	
2015	(Spain) Nacho Elvira	264	−24	2 strokes	(Portugal) Ricardo Gouveia	
2014	(South Korea) An Byeong-hun	269	−19	3 strokes	(France) Benjamin Hébert	
2013	(Sweden) Jens Dantorp	270	−18	1 stroke	(Spain) Adrián Otaegui	
2012	(Sweden) Kristoffer Broberg	261	−27	1 stroke	(United States) Sihwan Kim	
2011	(France) Benjamin Hébert	269	−19	1 stroke	(Spain) Jorge Campillo (England) Tommy Fleetwood	
2010	(Chile) Mark Tullo	266	−22	1 stroke	(Italy) Matteo Manassero	
Trophée du Golf de Genève
2009	(France) Julien Quesne	269	−19	1 stroke	(Italy) Edoardo Molinari	
Trophée du Golf Club de Genève
2008	(Sweden) Klas Eriksson	274	−14	Playoff	(Netherlands) Wil Besseling (Brazil) Alexandre Rocha	
Rolex Trophy
2007	(England) Robert Dinwiddie	270	−18	3 strokes	(England) Ross McGowan	
2006	(Sweden) Alex Norén	266	−22	3 strokes	(Sweden) Johan Axgren (England) Gareth Davies	
2005	(Scotland) Marc Warren	272	−16	Playoff	(England) Denny Lucas	
2004	(England) Phillip Archer	198 (Note: Shortened to 54 holes due to rain.)	−18	5 strokes	(England) Lee Slattery	
2003	(Sweden) Michael Jonzon	267	−21	3 strokes	(Austria) Martin Wiegele	
2002	(England) Simon Hurd	268	−20	4 strokes	(Argentina) Gustavo Rojas	
2001	(England) Stuart Little (2)	271	−17	2 strokes	(Switzerland) André Bossert	
2000	(Republic of Ireland) David Higgins	271	−17	4 strokes	(Venezuela) Carlos Larraín	
1999	(Spain) Carl Suneson (2)	268	−20	6 strokes	(Sweden) Adam Mednick	
1998	(Wales) David Park	276	−12	Playoff	(Sweden) Per Nyman	
Rolex Trophy Pro-Am
1997	(Finland) Anssi Kankkonen	276	−12	1 stroke	(Norway) Thomas Nielsen	
1996	(Sweden) Dennis Edlund	274	−14	Playoff	(England) Carl Watts	
Rolex Pro-Am
1995	(Spain) Carl Suneson	272	−16	1 stroke	(England) Simon Burnell	
1994	(England) Stuart Little	269	−19	2 strokes	(Sweden) Mats Hallberg	
1993	(England) Philip Golding	275	−13	3 strokes	(Sweden) Olle Nordberg	
1992	(United States) Ronald Stelten (2)	271	−17	4 strokes	(England) Wayne Stephens	
1991	(England) David R. Jones				(Italy) Silvio Grappasonni	
1990	(Republic of Ireland) John McHenry	279	−9	1 stroke	(England) Glenn Ralph	
1989	(United States) Ronald Stelten	280	−8	1 stroke	(England) Jeremy Bennett (West Germany) Heinz-Peter Thül (England) Clive Tucker	

== See also ==
- Omega European Masters – European Tour event held in Switzerland
- Swiss Challenge – another Challenge Tour event held in Switzerland
