= Is Molas Challenge =

Tournament information
- Location: Sardinia, Italy
- Established: 1996
- Course: Is Molas Golf Club
- Par: 72
- Tour: Challenge Tour
- Format: Stroke play
- Prize fund: €63,000
- Month played: June
- Final year: 1999

Tournament record score
- Aggregate: 270 Bradley Dredge (1999)
- To par: −18 as above

Final champion
- (Wales) Bradley Dredge
- Location in Italy Location in Sardinia

The Is Molas Challenge was a golf tournament on the Challenge Tour. It was played from 1996 to 1999 at Is Molas in Sardinia, Italy.

== Winners ==
Year	Winner	Score	To par	Margin of victory	Runner(s)-up	Ref.
1999	(Wales) Bradley Dredge	270	−18	2 strokes	(Austria) Markus Brier	
1998	(Sweden) Magnus Persson	283	−5	2 strokes	(France) Thomas Levet (France) Christophe Pottier	
1997	(England) Andrew Collison	281	−7	5 strokes	(Norway) Thomas Nielsen	
1996	(England) Simon Burnell	287	−1	1 stroke	(Italy) Alberto Binaghi (Italy) Massimo Florioli (Italy) Michele Reale (France) Jean-François Remésy (Sweden) Daniel Westermark	
