= Formby Hall Challenge =

Tournament information
- Location: Formby, Southport, England
- Established: 1996
- Course: Formby Hall Golf Club
- Par: 72
- Length: 6,951 yards (6,356 m)
- Tour: Challenge Tour
- Format: Stroke play
- Prize fund: £75,000
- Month played: September
- Final year: 2002

Tournament record score
- Aggregate: 267 Olivier Edmond (1997)
- To par: −20 Greig Hutcheon (1999) −20 Alastair Forsyth (1999)

Final champion
- (England) Matthew Blackey
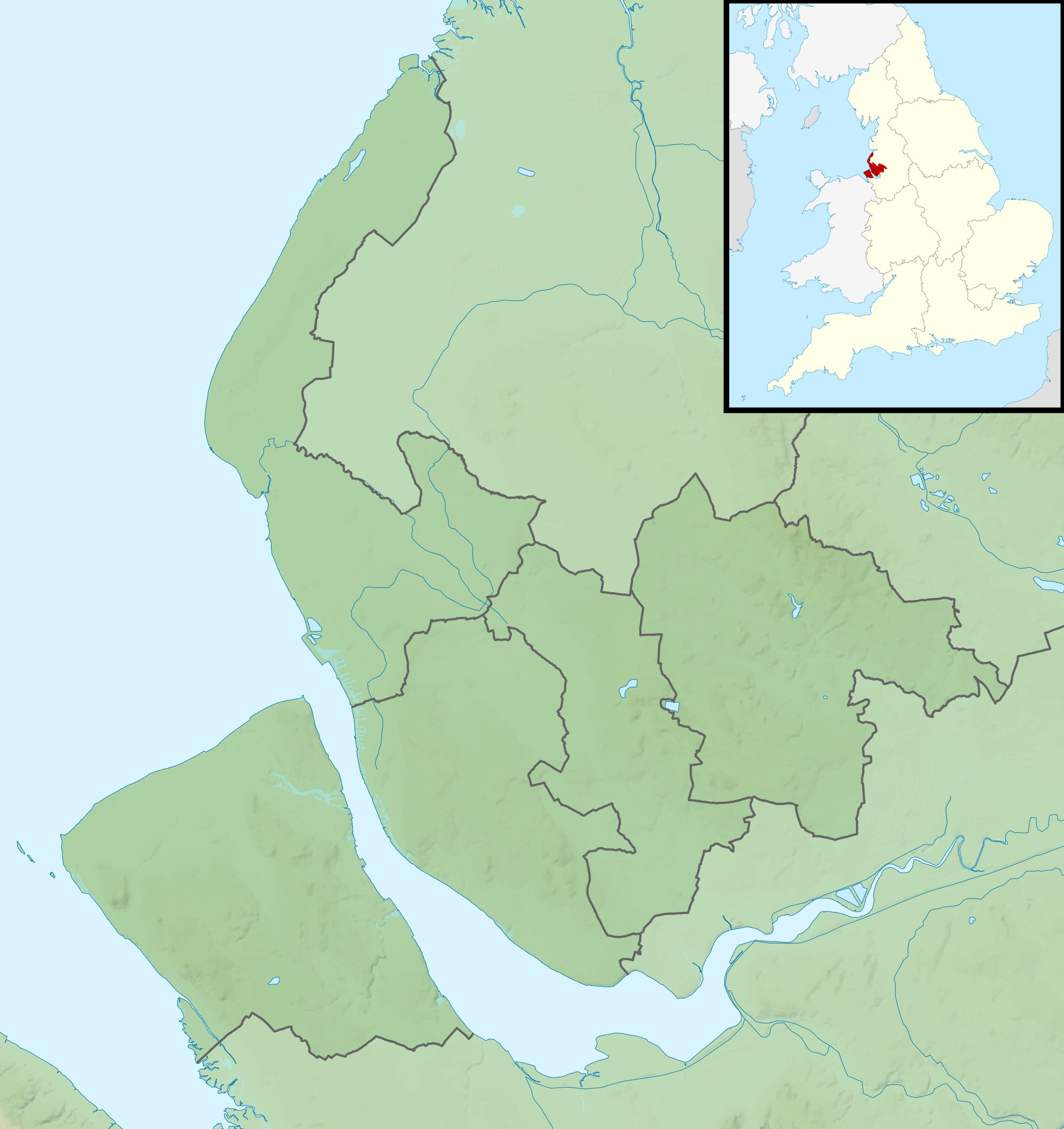
- Location in England Location in Merseyside

The Formby Hall Challenge was a golf tournament on the Challenge Tour that was played annually from 1996 to 2002. It was also an event on the third-tier MasterCard Tour.

With the merger of the MasterCard and Europro tours to form the PGA EuroPro Tour in 2003, the tournament was dropped from the Challenge Tour schedule. Formby Hall, host venue between 1999 and 2002, continued to host an event on the new tour.

== Winners ==
Year	Winner	Score	To par	Margin of victory	Runner(s)-up	Venue
Formby Hall Challenge
2002	(England) Matthew Blackey	275	−13	1 stroke	(England) David Dixon (Republic of Ireland) Damien McGrane	Formby Hall
2001	(England) Sam Little	276	−12	1 stroke	(England) Grant Hamerton	Formby Hall
2000	(Sweden) Fredrik Henge	270	−10	Playoff	(England) Simon Khan	Formby Hall
1999	(Scotland) Greig Hutcheon	268	−20	Playoff	(Scotland) Alastair Forsyth	Formby Hall
MasterCard Challenge
1998	(England) Robert Lee	277	−11	3 strokes	(England) Richard Bland	Princes
BPGT Challenge
1997	(France) Olivier Edmond	267	−21	2 strokes	(United States) Craig Hainline	Wynyard Hall
Gosen Challenge
1996	(England) Greg Owen	281	−7	Playoff	(England) John Mellor	Warwickshire
