= Luxembourg Open (golf) =

Clearstream International Luxembourg Open
Tournament information
- Location: Luxembourg
- Established: 1999
- Course: Kikuoka Country Club
- Par: 72
- Length: 7,067 yards (6,462 m)
- Tour: Challenge Tour
- Format: Stroke play
- Prize fund: €115,000
- Month played: June
- Final year: 2003

Tournament record score
- Aggregate: 264 Lee S. James (2002)
- To par: −24 as above

Final champion
- (England) Martin LeMesurier
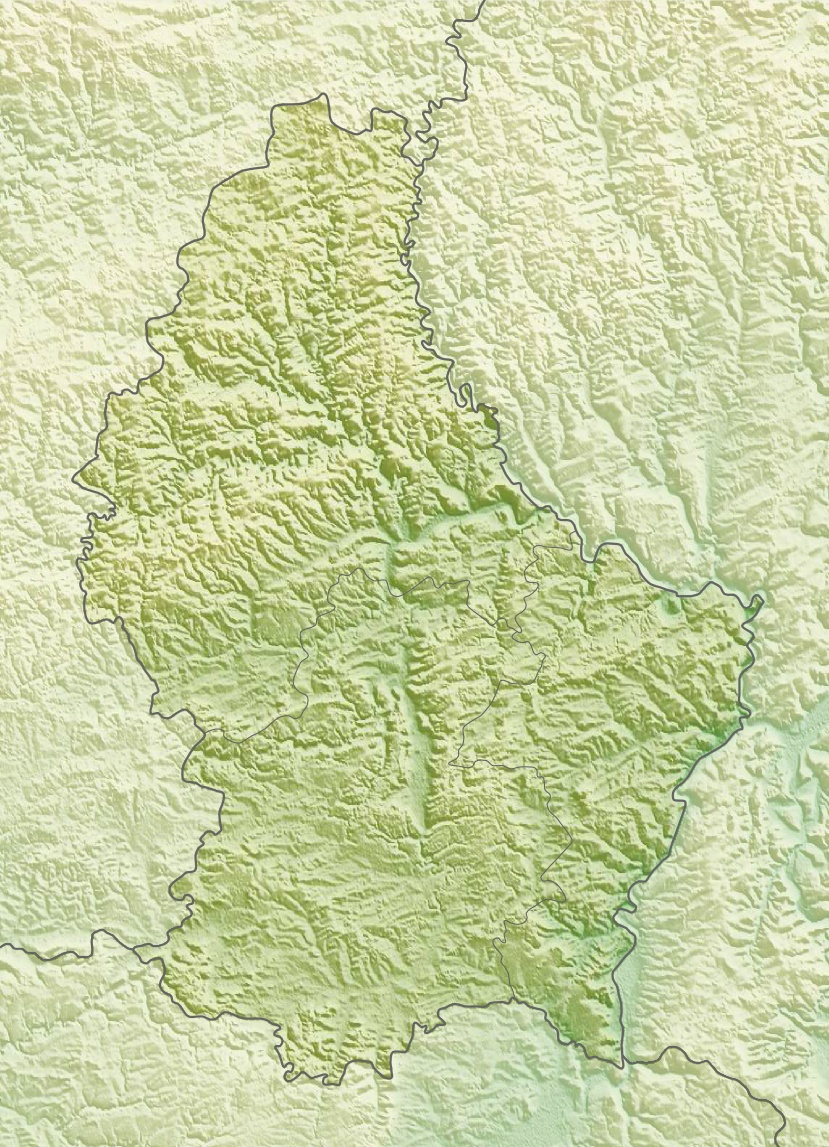
- Location in Luxembourg

The Luxembourg Open was a golf tournament on the Challenge Tour. It was played annually at Kikuoka Country Club in Luxembourg from 1999 to 2003.

== Winners ==
| Year | Winner | Score | To par | Margin of victory | Runner(s)-up |
Clearstream International Luxembourg Open
| 2003 | (England) Martin LeMesurier | 265 | −23 | 2 strokes | (Scotland) Greig Hutcheon |
| 2002 | (England) Lee S. James | 264 | −24 | 3 strokes | (England) Mark Sanders |
DEXIA-BIL Luxembourg Open
| 2001 | (England) Grant Hamerton | 271 | −17 | 3 strokes | (England) Mark Foster (Germany) Marcel Siem (England) Sam Walker |
| 2000 | (Sweden) Henrik Stenson | 270 | −18 | Playoff | (Belgium) Nicolas Colsaerts (a) (Denmark) Nils Roerbaek-Petersen |
BIL Luxembourg Open
| 1999 | (United States) Kevin Carissimi | 270 | −18 | 1 stroke | (New Zealand) Stephen Scahill |

== See also ==
- Open golf tournament
