= Challenge Chargeurs =

Golf tournament in France

Tournament information
- Location: Lille, France
- Established: 1993
- Course: Golf de Bondues
- Par: 72
- Tour: Challenge Tour
- Format: Stroke play
- Prize fund: £50,000
- Month played: July
- Final year: 1995

Tournament record score
- Aggregate: 268 Rolf Muntz (1995)
- To par: −20 as above

Final champion
- (Netherlands) Rolf Muntz

Location map
- Location in France Location in Hauts-de-France

The Challenge Chargeurs was a golf tournament on the Challenge Tour, held 1992–1995 in France.

== Winners ==
Year	Winner	Score	To par	Margin of victory	Runner(s)-up	Venue	Ref.
1995	(Netherlands) Rolf Muntz	268	−20	6 strokes	(France) Éric Giraud (Germany) Heinz-Peter Thül	Golf de Bondues	
1994	(Sweden) Daniel Chopra	272	−16	2 strokes	(England) Stuart Little	Golf du Médoc	
1993	(Sweden) Adam Mednick	278	−10	1 stroke	(France) Dominique Nouailhac	Golf du Médoc	
1992	(France) Géry Watine	278	−10	3 strokes	(France) Marc Pendariès (United States) Charles Raulerson	Golf du Médoc	
