= Pehr Magnebrant =

Swedish golfer

Personal information
- Nationality: Sweden
- Born: 30 September 1970 (age 56) Stockholm, Sweden
- Height: 1.86 m (6 ft 1 in)
- Weight: 83 kg (183 lb; 13.1 st)

Career
- Sport: Golf
- Turned professional: 1991
- Former tour: Challenge Tour
- Professional wins: 4

Number of wins by tour
- Challenge Tour: 2
- Other: 2

Pehr Magnebrant (born 30 September 1970) is a Swedish professional golfer.

Magnebrant played on the Challenge Tour 1992–2004 and won twice. His first professional win came in 1998 in Riva dei Tessali, near Castellaneta, Italy, where he beat future PGA Tour winner John Senden in a play-off.

He also played 19 events on the European Tour where his best performance was a tie for seventh at the 2001 Madeira Island Open.

== Professional wins (4) ==
=== Challenge Tour wins (2) ===
No.	Date	Tournament	Winning score	Margin of victory	Runner-up
1	28 Jun 1998	Open dei Tessali	−8 (71-69-65-71=276)	Playoff	(Australia) John Senden
2	22 Aug 1999	Norwegian Open	−7 (68-77-69-67=281)	3 strokes	(Sweden) Patrik Gottfridsson

=== Nordic Golf League wins (1) ===
No.	Date	Tournament	Winning score	Margin of victory	Runners-up
1	31 May 2008	Söderby Masters	−7 (65-72-72=209)	2 strokes	(Sweden) Fredrick Månsson, (Sweden) Frederick Qvicker

=== Other wins (1) ===
- 2002 Täljepokalen

== Team appearances ==
Amateur

- European Amateur Team Championship (representing Sweden): 1991
