= Jorge Berendt =

Argentine golfer

Personal information
- Full name: Jorge Alberto Berendt
- Nationality: Argentina
- Born: 19 July 1964 (age 62) Formosa, Argentina
- Height: 1.78 m (5 ft 10 in)
- Weight: 68 kg (150 lb; 10.7 st)
- Spouse: Sonia (m. 1986)
- Children: Leandro, Erica, Brian

Career
- Sport: Golf
- Turned professional: 1982
- Current tour: European Seniors Tour
- Former tours: European Tour; Tour de las Américas
- Professional wins: 19

Number of wins by tour
- European Tour: 1
- Challenge Tour: 2
- Other: 16

Best results in major championships
- Masters Tournament: DNP
- PGA Championship: DNP
- U.S. Open: DNP
- The Open Championship: T68: 1990

Jorge Alberto Berendt (born 19 July 1964) is an Argentine professional golfer.

== Early life ==
Berendt was born in Formosa, Argentina. He worked as a caddie early in his life.

== Professional career ==
In 1982, he turned professional. He competed in the British Open in 1990. He played on the European Tour and Challenge Tour from 1990 to 2004, winning one tournament, the Cannes Open in 2001. He was second in the 1993 Portuguese Open, the 2002 Hong Kong Open, the 1991 Les Bulles Laurent-Perrier, and the 1999 Argentine PGA Championship. Between 2006 and 2018 he worked as a commentator for The Golf Channel in Latin America.

== Professional wins (19) ==
=== European Tour wins (1) ===
No.	Date	Tournament	Winning score	Margin of victory	Runner-up
1	14 Oct 2001	Cannes Open	−20 (67-66-67-68=268)	1 stroke	(France) Jean van de Velde

European Tour playoff record (0–1)

No.	Year	Tournament	Opponent	Result
1	1993	Portuguese Open	(England) David Gilford	Lost to birdie on first extra hole

=== Challenge Tour wins (2) ===
Legend
Tour Championships (1)
Other Challenge Tour (1)

No.	Date	Tournament	Winning score	Margin of victory	Runner-up
1	16 Mar 1997	Lonrho Kenya Open	−16 (70-68-64-66=268)	4 strokes	(South Africa) Sammy Daniels
2	24 Oct 1998	AXA Grand Final	−13 (69-67-71-68=275)	Playoff	(England) Warren Bennett

Challenge Tour playoff record (1–0)

No.	Year	Tournament	Opponent	Result
1	1998	AXA Grand Final	(England) Warren Bennett	Won with birdie on fourth extra hole

=== Argentina wins (13) ===
- 1984 Golfer's Grand Prix
- 1988 Acantilados Grand Prix
- 1989 Norpatagonico Open, Abierto del Litoral
- 1991 San Isidro International Open, Abierto del Litoral
- 1993 Center Open
- 1996 North Open
- 1997 South Open
- 1999 Hindu Club Grand Prix
- 2001 Carilo Grand Prix
- 2005 Carilo Grand Prix
- 2006 SHA Grand Prix

=== Other wins (3) ===
- 1997 Viña del Mar Open (Chile), Beirut Open (Lebanon)
- 2008 La Posada de la Concepcion Grand Prix (Chile)

== Team appearances ==
- World Cup (representing Argentina): 1996, 1997
