= Open di Puglia e Basilicata =

Tournament information
- Location: Castellaneta, Italy
- Established: 1983
- Courses: Riva dei Tessali Golf Club; Metaponto Golf Club
- Par: 71 (R); 72 (M)
- Length: 6,503 yards (5,946 m) (R); 6,815 yards (6,232 m) (M)
- Tours: Alps Tour; Challenge Tour
- Format: Stroke play
- Prize fund: €45,000
- Month played: October
- Final year: 2010

Tournament record score
- Aggregate: 266 Kenneth Ferrie (2000)
- To par: −18 as above

Final champion
- (Spain) Miguel Pujalte Sastre
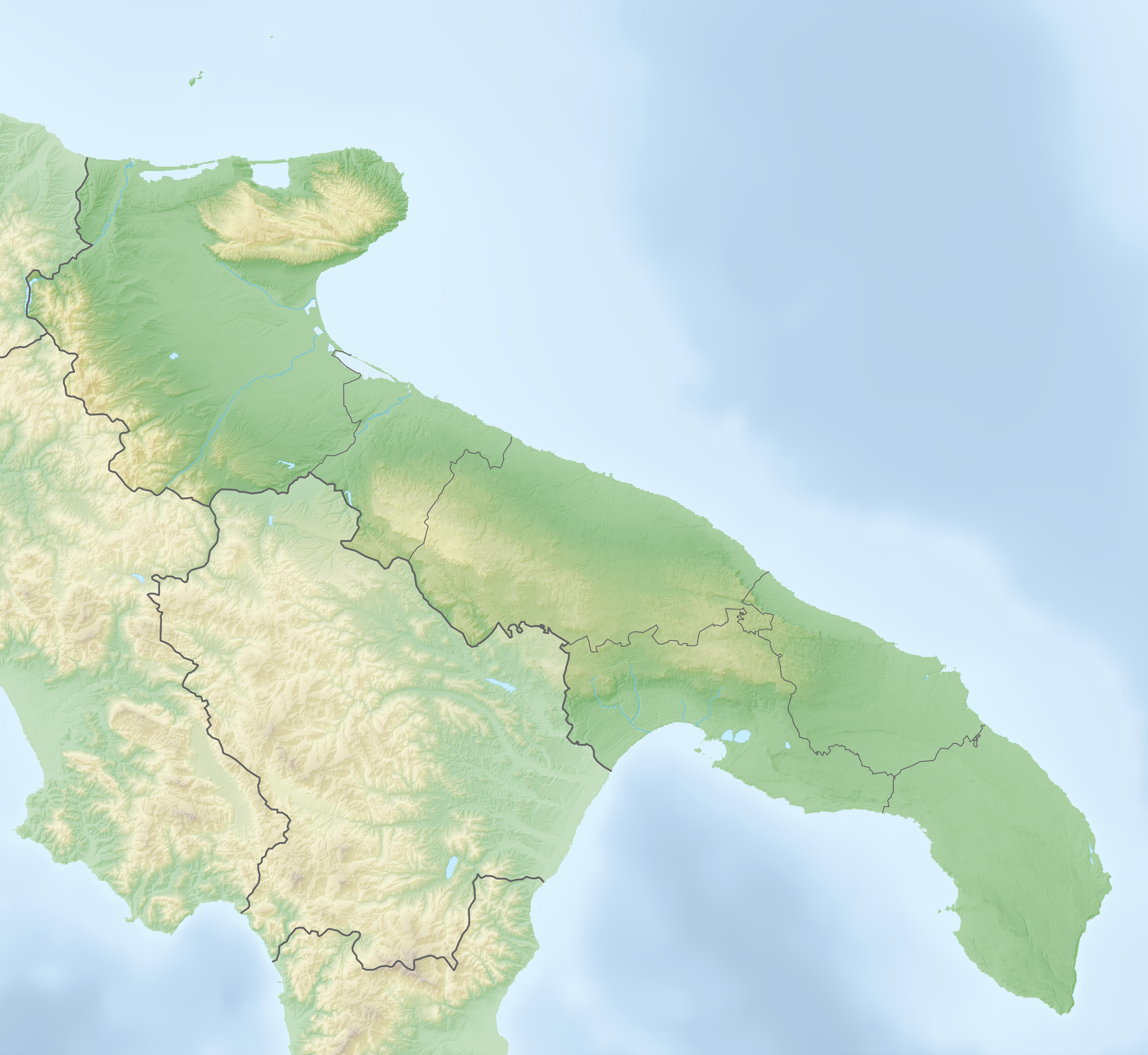
- Location in Italy Location in Apulia

The Open di Puglia e Basilicata is an annual professional golf tournament held in Riva dei Tessali, near Castellaneta, Italy.

First held in 1983, there was a brief hiatus before the second edition in 1986. The tournament became part of the second tier Challenge Tour schedule in 1991, where it remained until 2007. Since 2008, it has been an event on the third tier Alps Tour. It also forms part of the Italian Pro Tour.

Prior to 2003, it was solely hosted at Riva dei Tessali Golf Club, but since then it has been jointly held at Metaponto Golf Club.

== Winners ==
Year	Tour (Note: ALP − Alps Tour; CHA − Challenge Tour.)	Winner	Score	To par	Margin of victory	Runner(s)-up
Open di Puglia and Basilicata
2010	ALP	(Spain) Miguel Pujalte Sastre	201	−13	3 strokes	(Italy) Matteo Delpodio (Italy) Andrea Rota
2009	ALP	(Italy) Paolo Terreni	137 (Note: Shortened to 36 holes due to rain.)	−6	Playoff	(Italy) Andrea Perrino
Tessali-Metaponto Open di Puglia e Basilicata
2008	ALP	(Switzerland) Martin Rominger	274	−11	1 stroke	(France) Julien Grillon
2007	CHA	(Northern Ireland) Michael Hoey	272	−13	Playoff	(Wales) Liam Bond
2006	CHA	(France) Anthony Snobeck	272	−14	Playoff	(Wales) Kyron Sullivan
2005	CHA	(Argentina) Rafael Gómez	267	−17	1 stroke	(Sweden) Johan Edfors
2004	CHA	(Sweden) Leif Westerberg	274	−10	1 stroke	(England) Oliver Wilson
2003	CHA	(England) Martin LeMesurier	273	−11	Playoff	(Switzerland) André Bossert (England) Sam Walker
Tessali Open del Sud
2002	CHA	(England) Simon Wakefield	274	−10	1 stroke	(England) Andrew Raitt
2001: No tournament
2000	CHA	(England) Kenneth Ferrie	266	−18	3 strokes	(England) Mark Foster (France) Christophe Pottier
Open dei Tessali
1999	CHA	(Argentina) Gustavo Rojas	272	−12	2 strokes	(Belgium) Didier de Vooght
1998	CHA	(Sweden) Pehr Magnebrant	276	−8	Playoff	(Australia) John Senden
1997	CHA	(Spain) Ivó Giner	280	−4	3 strokes	(Australia) Stephen Leaney
1996	CHA	(New Zealand) Stephen Scahill	279	−5	6 strokes	(Finland) Pauli Hughes
Tessali Open
1995	CHA	(England) Andrew Collison	279	−5	2 strokes	(England) Jonathan Sewell
1994	CHA	(England) Michael Archer	282	−2	1 stroke	(France) Stephan Catherine (Sweden) Daniel Westermark
1993	CHA	(Sweden) Olle Nordberg	287	−1	Playoff	(England) Neal Briggs (England) Andrew Sandywell
1992	CHA	(Sweden) Anders Gillner	279	−5	Playoff	(Italy) Baldovino Dassù
1991	CHA	(France) Éric Giraud	281	−3		(England) Jeremy Robinson
1990	CHA	(Italy) Emanuele Bolognesi (2)	288			
1989	CHA	(England) Neal Briggs	284	E	1 stroke	(Italy) Emanuele Bolognesi
1988		(Italy) Baldovino Dassù (2)	288			
1987		(Italy) Giuseppe Calì	289			
1986		(Italy) Emanuele Bolognesi	289			
1984–85: No tournament
1983		(Italy) Baldovino Dassù	289			
