= 1994 Challenge Tour =

Golf tour season

1994 Challenge Tour season
- Duration: 16 March 1994 – 9 October 1994
- Number of official events: 34
- Most wins: (New Zealand) Michael Campbell (3)
- Rankings: (Northern Ireland) Raymond Burns

The 1994 Challenge Tour was the sixth season of the Challenge Tour, the official development tour to the European Tour.

== Schedule ==
The following table lists official events during the 1994 season.

Date	Tournament	Host country	Purse (£)	Winner (Note: The number in brackets after each winner's name is the number of Challenge Tour events they had won up to and including that tournament. This information is only shown for Challenge Tour members. It is rare for someone to accumulate many wins on the Challenge Tour as success at this level usually leads to promotion to the European Tour.)	Notes
19 Mar	Tunisian Challenge	Tunisia	70,000	(England) Jon Robson (1)	New tournament
26 Mar	El Corte Inglés Open	Spain	Pta 6,000,000	(Spain) Juan Carlos Piñero (2)	
2 Apr	Tessali Open	Italy	Lit 100,000,000	(England) Michael Archer (1)	
10 Apr	Open Jezequel	France	55,000	(England) Carl Watts (1)	
22 Apr	Stockley Park Challenge	England	40,000	(England) Ricky Willison (1)	
30 Apr	Centenario Copa Palmer	Spain	Pta 10,000,000	(Sweden) Daniel Westermark (2)	New tournament
28 May	Club Med Open	Italy	Lit 150,000,000	(Northern Ireland) Raymond Burns (1)	
29 May	Ramlösa Open	Sweden	SKr 315,000	(Sweden) Eric Carlberg (a) (1)	
5 Jun	SIAB Open	Sweden	SKr 350,000	(Norway) Per Haugsrud (2)	
5 Jun	Challenge AGF	France	50,000	(England) Jon Robson (2)	
12 Jun	Himmerland Open	Denmark	SKr 360,000	(England) Michael Archer (2)	New tournament
26 Jun	Memorial Olivier Barras	Switzerland	CHF 75,000	(New Zealand) Michael Campbell (1)	
3 Jul	Bank Austria Open	Austria	50,000	(New Zealand) Michael Campbell (2)	
3 Jul	Västerås Open	Sweden	SKr 315,000	(Sweden) Joakim Grönhagen (1)	
3 Jul	Neuchâtel Open SBS Trophy	Switzerland	CHF 150,000	(Netherlands) Rolf Muntz (1)	
9 Jul	Open Divonne	France	55,000	(England) Stuart Cage (1)	
10 Jul	Volvo Finnish Open	Finland	SKr 350,000	(Finland) Mikael Piltz (1)	
17 Jul	Open des Volcans	France	70,000	(France) Éric Giraud (2)	
24 Jul	Interlaken Open	Switzerland	CHF 100,000	(England) Neal Briggs (2)	
24 Jul	Jämtland Open	Sweden	SKr 315,000	(Sweden) Daniel Chopra (1)	New tournament
6 Aug	Rolex Pro-Am	Switzerland	CHF 100,000	(England) Stuart Little (1)	
7 Aug	SM Match Play	Sweden	SKr 315,000	(Sweden) Per Nyman (2)	
14 Aug	Audi Quattro Trophy	Germany	55,000	(New Zealand) Michael Campbell (3)	
21 Aug	Karsten Ping Norwegian Challenge	Norway	SKr 700,000	(Northern Ireland) Raymond Burns (2)	New tournament
26 Aug	Gore-Tex Challenge	Scotland	35,000	(England) John Bickerton (1)	
28 Aug	Toyota Danish PGA Championship	Denmark	SKr 360,000	(Sweden) Anders Overbring (1)	
4 Sep	Open de Dijon Bourgogne	France	35,000	(Italy) Marcello Santi (1)	
4 Sep	Compaq Open	Sweden	SKr 315,000	(Sweden) Adam Mednick (3)	
11 Sep	Dutch Challenge Open	Netherlands	ƒ190,000	(France) Jean-François Remésy (1)	
18 Sep	Challenge Novotel	France	50,000	(Sweden) Jarmo Sandelin (2)	
24 Sep	Perrier European Pro-Am	Belgium	50,000	(England) Andrew Sandywell (1)	
25 Sep	Team Erhverv Danish Open	Denmark	SKr 630,000	(England) Liam White (1)	
2 Oct	Challenge Chargeurs	France	50,000	(Sweden) Daniel Chopra (2)	
9 Oct	Biarritz International Pro-Am	France	25,000	(Wales) Mark Litton (3)	

=== Unofficial events ===
The following events were sanctioned by the Challenge Tour, but did not carry official money, nor were wins official.

Date	Tournament	Host country	Purse (£)	Winner	Notes
15 May	American Express Trophy	Germany	40,000	(Germany) Torsten Giedeon	
15 May	Scottish Professional Championship	Scotland	55,000	(Scotland) Andrew Coltart	

== Rankings ==
The rankings were based on prize money won during the season, calculated in Pound sterling. The top 10 players on the rankings earned status to play on the 1995 European Tour (Volvo Tour).

Rank	Player	Prize money (£)
1	(Northern Ireland) Raymond Burns	43,583
2	(England) Jon Robson	38,334
3	(New Zealand) Michael Campbell	29,707
4	(England) Michael Archer	29,673
5	(England) Neal Briggs	29,626

== See also ==
- 1994 Swedish Golf Tour
