= 1989 European Amateur Team Championship =

Golf competition

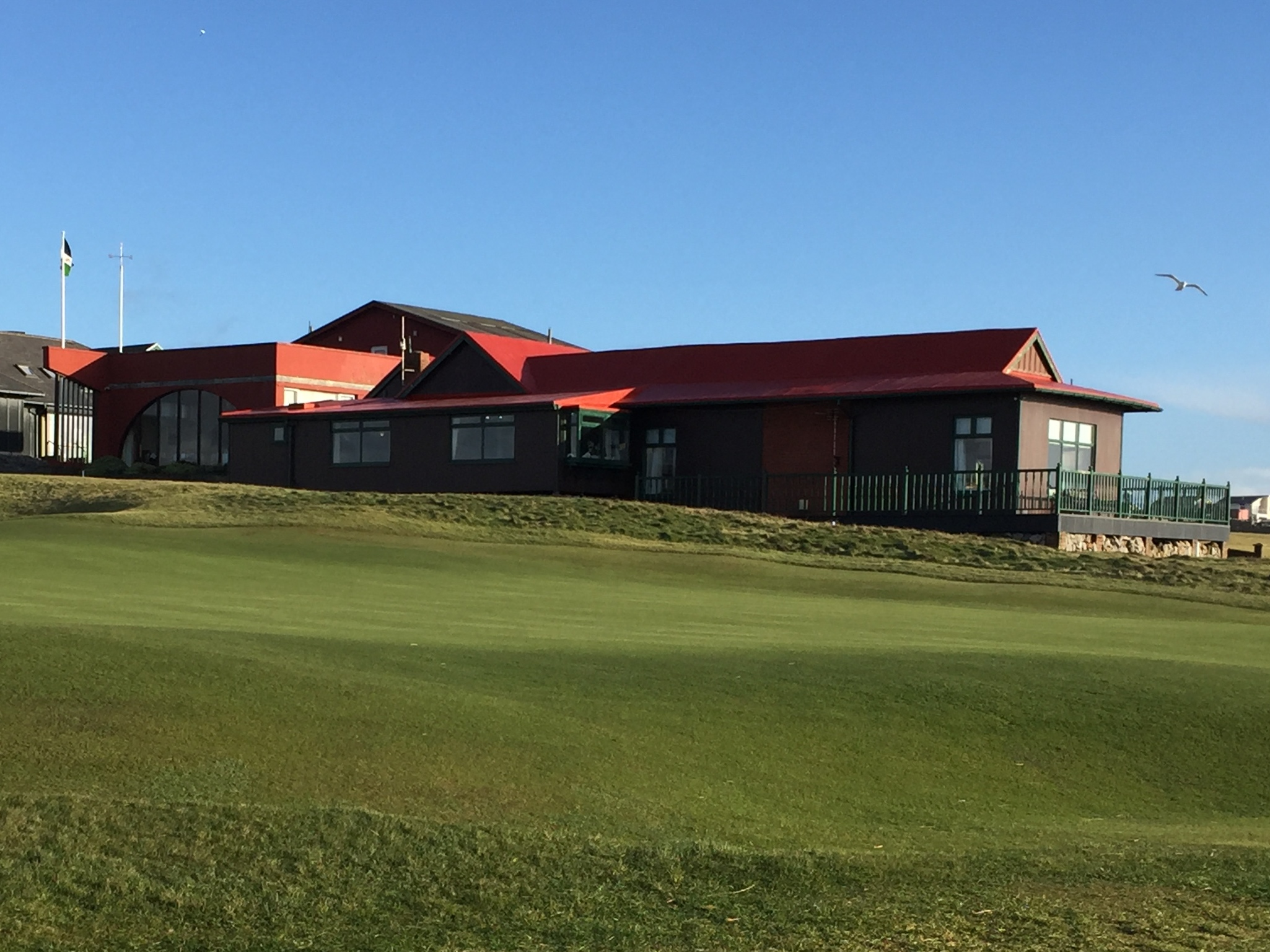
- Royal Porthcawl Clubhouse

Tournament information
- Dates: 28 June – 2 July 1989
- Location: Porthcawl, Wales, United Kingdom; 51.492°N 3.726°W
- Course: Royal Porthcawl Golf Club
- Organized by: European Golf Association
- Format: Qualification round: 36 holes stroke play Knock-out match-play

Statistics
- Par: 72
- Length: 6,643 yards (6,074 m)
- Field: 20 teams 120 players

Champion
- England; Russell Claydon, Andrew Hare, Peter McEvoy, Carl Suneson, Darren Prosser, Ricky Willison
- Qualification round: 757 (+37); Final match: 5–2
- Location in Europe Location on the British Isles Location in Wales

The 1989 European Amateur Team Championship took place 28 June – 2 July at Royal Porthcawl Golf Club, Wales, United Kingdom. It was the 16th men's golf European Amateur Team Championship.

== Venue ==
The hosting club was founded in 1891. In 1895, the course, designed by Ramsey Hunter, was located close to Pink Bay Beach on the Glamorgan Coast between Cardiff and Swansea in Wales. It had previously hosted The Amateur Championship on five occasions, including in 1988.

On the first day of the tournament, there were strong winds and rain on the course, set up with par 72 over 6,643 yards.

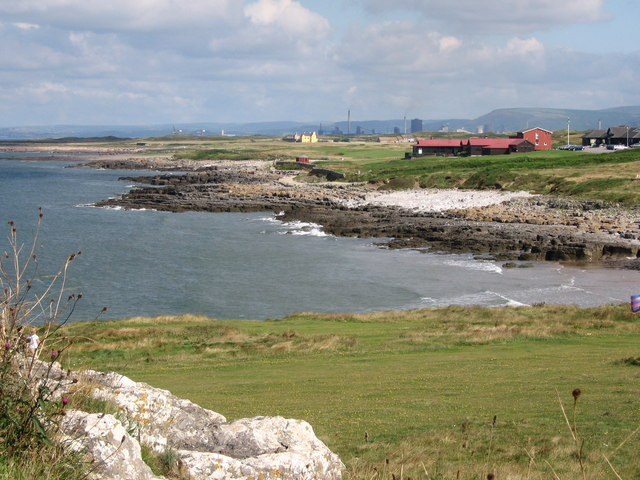
The course at Royal Porthcawl Golf Club

== Format ==
Each team consisted of six players, playing two rounds of stroke-play over two days, counting the five best scores each day for each team.

The eight best teams formed flight A, in knock-out match-play over the next three days. The teams were seeded based on their positions after the stroke play. The first placed team were drawn to play the quarter-final against the eight placed team, the second against the seventh, the third against the sixth and the fourth against the fifth. Teams were allowed to use six players during the team matches, selecting four of them in the two morning foursome games and five players in to the afternoon single games. Games all square at the 18th hole were declared halved, if the team match was already decided.

The eight teams placed 9–16 in the qualification stroke-play formed flight B and the four teams placed 17–20 formed flight C, to play similar knock-out play, to decide their final positions.

== Teams ==
20 nation teams contested the event. Each team consisted of six players.

Players in the leading teams

Country	Players
England	Russell Claydon, Andrew Hare, Peter McEvoy, Carl Suneson, Darren Prosser, Ricky Willison
France	Christian Cévaër, Olivier Edmond, Eric Giraud, François Illouz, Romain Victor
Ireland	Neil Anderson, Jim Carvill, Darren Clarke, Mark Gannon, Garth McGimpsey, Eoghan O'Connell
Norway	Tom Edseth, Knut Ekjord, Tom Fredriksen, Christian Gavelstad, Thomas Nielsen, Øyvind Rojahn
Scotland	David Carrick, Andrew Coltart, Stephen Easingwood, Craig Everett, Andrew Elliot, Jim Milligan
Sweden	Mathias Grönberg, Per-Ulrik Johansson, Lars Herne, Robert Karlsson, Per Nyman, Raimo Sjöberg
Switzerland	Andreas Bauer, Nicolas Billieux, André Bossert, Ivan Couturier, Marcus Gottstein, Pierre-Alain Rey
Wales	Stephen Dodd, Keith Jones, Michael Macara, J. Peters, Philip Price, Neil Roderick
West Germany	Hans-Günther Reiter, C. Schapmann, Jan-Erik Schapmann, Ulrich Schulte, Sven Strüver, Ulrich Zilg

Other participating teams

Country
Austria
Belgium
Czechoslovakia
Denmark
Finland
Greece
Iceland
Italy
Netherlands
Portugal
Spain

== Winners ==
Team England won the opening 36-hole stroke-play qualifying competition, with a 37-over-per score of 757.

There was no official award for the lowest individual score, but individual leader was Russell Claydon, England, with a 1-under-par score of 143, five strokes ahead of nearest competitors.

Team England won the gold medal, earning their seventh title, beating team Scotland in the final 5–2.

Defending champions team Ireland earned the bronze on third place, after beating Sweden 5–2 in the bronze match.

== Results ==
Qualification round

Team standings

Place	Country	Score	To par
1	England	396-361=757	+37
2	Ireland	397-365=762	+42
3	Wales	403-363=766	+46
T4	France *	399-379=778	+58
T4	Sweden	402-376=778	+58
6	Scotland	416-368=784	+64
7	West Germany	415-371=786	+66
8	Norway	413-380=793	+73
9	Denmark	422-373=795	+75
10	Spain	412-384=796	+76
11	Netherlands	417-382=799	+79
12	Italy	419-383=802	+82
13	Iceland	418-386=804	+84
14	Switzerland	429-388=817	+97
15	Finland	440-389=829	+109
16	Portugal	431- 406=837	+117
17	Belgium	440-402=842	+122
18	Greece	443-403=846	+126
T19	Czechoslovakia *	441-409=850	+130
T19	Austria	433-417=850	+130

* Note: In the event of a tie the order was determined by the best total of the two non-counting scores of the two rounds.

Individual leaders

Place	Player	Country	Score	To par
1	Russell Claydon	England	72-71=143	−1
T2	Rene Budde	Denmark	78-70=148	+4
T2	Garth McGimpsey	Ireland	77-71=148	+4
T4	Robert Karlsson	Sweden	76-73=149	+5
T4	Peter McEvoy	England	79-70=149	+5
T4	Eoghan O'Connell	Ireland	77-72=149	+5

Note: There was no official award for the lowest individual score.

Flight A

Bracket

Quarter finals
Ireland	4.5
West Germany	2.5
Scotland	4
Wales	3
Sweden	4
France	3
England	5.5
Norway	1.5

Semi finals
Scotland	4.5
Ireland	2.5
England	6
Sweden	1

Final
England	5
Scotland	2
Bronze match
Ireland	5
Sweden	2

Elimination matches
Wales	4.5
West Germany	2.5
Norway	4.5
France	2.5

Match for 5th place
Wales	5
Norway	2
Match for 7th place
West Germany	4
France	3

Final games

England	Scotland
5	2
R. Claydon / A. Hare	J. Milligan / A. Elliot 2 & 1
P. McEvoy / R. Willison 20th hole	D. Carrick / C. Everett
Andrew Hare 4 & 3	Jim Milligan
Russell Claydon 2 & 1	Stephen Easingwood
Peter McEvoy 3 & 1	David Carrick
Carl Suneson	Andrew Elliot 4 & 2
Ricky Willison 5 & 4	Craig Everett

Final standings

Place	Country
1st place, gold medalist(s)	England
2nd place, silver medalist(s)	Scotland
3rd place, bronze medalist(s)	Ireland
4	Sweden
5	Wales
6	Norway
7	West Germany
8	France
9	Spain
10	Italy
11	Netherlands
12	Denmark
13	Iceland
14	Switzerland
15	Finland
16	Portugal
17	Austria
18	Greece
19	Belgium
20	Czechoslovakia

== See also ==
- Eisenhower Trophy – biennial world amateur team golf championship for men organized by the International Golf Federation.
- European Ladies' Team Championship – European amateur team golf championship for women organised by the European Golf Association.
