= 1995 Challenge Tour =

Golf tour season

1995 Challenge Tour season
- Duration: 2 March 1995 – 15 October 1995
- Number of official events: 30
- Most wins: (Denmark) Thomas Bjørn (3)
- Rankings: (Denmark) Thomas Bjørn

The 1995 Challenge Tour was the seventh season of the Challenge Tour, the official development tour to the European Tour.

== Schedule ==
The following table lists official events during the 1995 season.

Date	Tournament	Host country	Purse (£)	Winner (Note: The number in brackets after each winner's name is the number of Challenge Tour events they had won up to and including that tournament. This information is only shown for Challenge Tour members. It is rare for someone to accumulate many wins on the Challenge Tour as success at this level usually leads to promotion to the European Tour.)	Notes
5 Mar	Kenya Open	Kenya	65,000	(Wales) James Lee (1)	
30 Apr	Canarias Challenge	Spain	Pta 11,000,000	(Spain) Pedro Linhart (1)	
14 May	KB Golf Challenge	Czech Republic	60,000	(France) Éric Giraud (3)	New tournament
28 May	Compaq Open	Sweden	SKr 350,000	(Sweden) Dennis Edlund (2)	
4 Jun	SIAB Open	Sweden	SKr 350,000	(Finland) Anssi Kankkonen (1)	
5 Jun	Challenge Chargeurs	France	50,000	(Netherlands) Rolf Muntz (2)	
11 Jun	Himmerland Open	Denmark	SKr 350,000	(Denmark) Thomas Bjørn (1)	
11 Jun	Club Med Open	Italy	Lit 160,000,000	(Italy) Emanuele Bolognesi (2)	
25 Jun	Team Erhverv Danish Open	Denmark	SKr 640,000	(England) Rob Edwards (1)	
25 Jun	Memorial Olivier Barras	Switzerland	CHF 75,000	(England) Simon D. Hurley (4)	
2 Jul	Neuchâtel Open SBS Trophy	Switzerland	CHF 75,000	(Belgium) Nicolas Vanhootegem (1)	
9 Jul	Open Divonne	France	50,000	(Sweden) Patrik Sjöland (1)	
9 Jul	Volvo Finnish Open	Finland	SKr 350,000	(Sweden) Fredrik Plahn (1)	
15 Jul	Open des Volcans	France	55,000	(Germany) Thomas Gögele (1)	
23 Jul	Interlaken Open	Switzerland	CHF 100,000	(Denmark) Thomas Bjørn (2)	
30 Jul	Karsten Ping Norwegian Open	Norway	SKr 700,000	(England) Stephen Field (2)	
6 Aug	Audi Quattro Trophy	Germany	72,000	(Netherlands) Joost Steenkamer (1)	
6 Aug	Rolex Pro-Am	Switzerland	CHF 75,000	(Spain) Carl Suneson (1)	
13 Aug	SM Match Play	Sweden	SKr 350,000	(Sweden) Peter Thörn (1)	
20 Aug	Steelcover Dutch Challenge Open	Netherlands	ƒ190,000	(England) Warren Bennett (1)	
20 Aug	Toyota Danish PGA Championship	Denmark	SKr 350,000	(France) François Lamare (1)	
26 Aug	Coca-Cola Open	England	65,000	(Denmark) Thomas Bjørn (3)	
2 Sep	Tessali Open	Italy	Lit 110,000,000	(England) Andrew Collison (1)	
10 Sep	Perrier European Pro-Am	Belgium	55,000	(Spain) Diego Borrego (2)	
17 Sep	Open de Dijon Bourgogne	France	35,000	(France) Tim Planchin (3)	
17 Sep	Kentab Open	Sweden	SKr 350,000	(Sweden) Per Nyman (3)	
23 Sep	Eulen Open Galea	Spain	Pta 15,000,000	(Denmark) Ben Tinning (1)	New tournament
29 Sep	Lomas Bosque Challenge	Spain	Pta 6,000,000	(Sweden) Per Nyman (4)	New tournament
7 Oct	Tunisian Open Challenge	Tunisia	70,000	(England) Ricky Willison (2)	
15 Oct	UAP Grand Final	Portugal	60,000	(Spain) Francisco Valera (2)	Tour Championship (Note: Also a new tournament.)

=== Unofficial events ===
The following events were sanctioned by the Challenge Tour, but did not carry official money, nor were wins official.

Date	Tournament	Host country	Purse (£)	Winner	Notes
17 Jun	Italian Native Open	Italy	Lit 140,000,000	(Italy) Emanuele Bolognesi	
18 Jun	Championnat de France Pro	France	50,000	(France) Éric Giraud	
24 Jun	Nedcar National Open	Netherlands	ƒ50,000	(Netherlands) Rolf Muntz	
31 Jul	UPS German PGA Championship	Germany	25,000	(Germany) Erol Şimşek	
13 Aug	Finnish PGA Championship	Finland	3,500	(Finland) Mikael Piltz	
13 Aug	Esbjerg Danish Closed	Denmark	10,000	(Denmark) Thomas Bjørn	
4 Oct	Swiss PGA Championship	Switzerland	CHF 25,000	(Switzerland) Steve Rey	

== Rankings ==
The rankings were based on prize money won during the season, calculated in Pound sterling. The top 10 players on the rankings earned status to play on the 1996 European Tour.

Rank	Player	Prize money (£)
1	(Denmark) Thomas Bjørn	46,471
2	(France) Tim Planchin	32,702
3	(Spain) Diego Borrego	32,459
4	(France) Éric Giraud	27,365
5	(England) Simon D. Hurley	25,683

== See also ==
- 1995 Swedish Golf Tour
