= Carl Suneson =

Spanish golfer

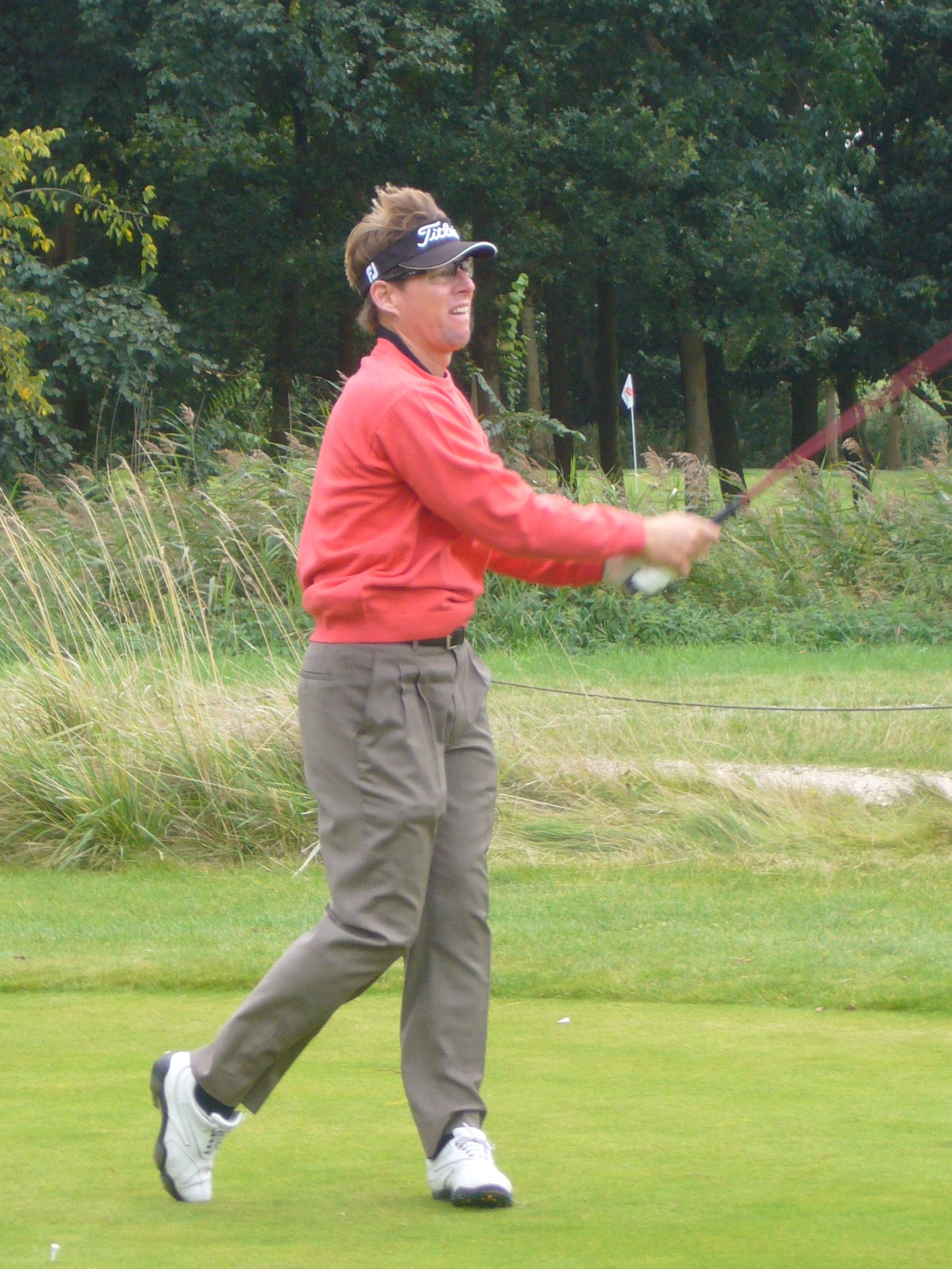

Personal information
- Full name: Carl José Suneson
- Nationality: Spain
- Born: 22 July 1967 (age 59) Las Palmas, Gran Canaria, Spain
- Height: 1.80 m (5 ft 11 in)
- Weight: 85 kg (187 lb; 13.4 st)

Career
- Sport: Golf
- College: Oklahoma State University
- Turned professional: 1990
- Current tour: European Senior Tour
- Former tours: European Tour; Challenge Tour
- Professional wins: 6

Number of wins by tour
- European Tour: 1
- Challenge Tour: 6 (Tied-5th all-time)

Best results in major championships
- Masters Tournament: DNP
- PGA Championship: DNP
- U.S. Open: DNP
- The Open Championship: T64: 1996

Achievements and awards
- Challenge Tour Rankings winner: 1999

Carl José Suneson (born 22 July 1967) is a Spanish professional golfer. He won the 2007 Open de Saint-Omer, his only European Tour success.

== Early life and amateur career ==
Suneson was born in Las Palmas, Gran Canaria to a Swedish father and an English mother. He represented England in amateur competition, and attended Oklahoma State University in the United States, but in 1996 he took Spanish citizenship.

== Professional career ==
Suneson turned professional in 1990. He has played extensively on the European Tour and the second tier Challenge Tour. His best finish on the European Tour Order of Merit through 2008 is 48th in 1996, but he has often had difficulty holding onto his tour card. He has been successful at qualifying school on several occasions, but has dropped down to the Challenge Tour more than once, where he finished on top of the season ending rankings in 1999, also finishing second in 2005.

Suneson had to wait 18 years, until his 256th start before he finally claimed his first European Tour title at the 2007 Open de Saint-Omer. Played during the same week as the U.S. Open, the tournament was dual ranking event with the Challenge Tour, and brought his tally of wins on that tour to six.

Since 2017 Suneson has played a number of events on the European Senior Tour. In January 2020 Seneson gained a place on the 2020 European Senior Tour through Q-school. He gained the fifth and final qualifying place after a three-man playoff, making a birdie at the first extra hole.

== Professional wins (6) ==
=== European Tour wins (1) ===
No.	Date	Tournament	Winning score	Margin of victory	Runners-up
1	17 Jun 2007	Open de Saint-Omer^{1}	−8 (67-70-70-69=276)	3 strokes	(France) François Calmels, (Australia) Peter Fowler, (England) Marcus Higley

^{1}Dual-ranking event with the Challenge Tour

=== Challenge Tour wins (6) ===
Legend
Tour Championships (1)
Other Challenge Tour (5)

No.	Date	Tournament	Winning score	Margin of victory	Runner(s)-up
1	6 Aug 1995	Rolex Pro-Am	−16 (66-70-69-67=272)	1 stroke	(England) Simon Burnell
2	2 May 1999	Comunitat Valenciana Challenge de España	−8 (73-68-71-68=280)	2 strokes	(Spain) Manuel Moreno
3	18 Jul 1999	Rolex Trophy (2)	−20 (68-68-67-65=268)	6 strokes	(Sweden) Adam Mednick
4	8 Aug 1999	Beazer Homes Challenge Tour Championship	−16 (68-68-70-66=272)	8 strokes	(Wales) Bradley Dredge, (Netherlands) Maarten Lafeber, (France) Benoît Teilleria
5	22 Oct 2005	Apulia San Domenico Grand Final	−15 (69-71-65-68=273)	1 stroke	(Argentina) Daniel Vancsik, (Scotland) Marc Warren
6	17 Jun 2007	Open de Saint-Omer^{1}	−8 (67-70-70-69=276)	3 strokes	(France) François Calmels, (Australia) Peter Fowler, (England) Marcus Higley

^{1}Dual-ranking event with the European Tour

== Results in major championships ==
Tournament	1991	1992	1993	1994	1995	1996	1997	1998
The Open Championship	T96					T64		CUT

Note: Suneson only played in The Open Championship.

Did not play

CUT = missed the half-way cut
"T" = tied

== Team appearances ==
- European Amateur Team Championship (representing England): 1989

== See also ==
- 2005 Challenge Tour graduates
- 2006 European Tour Qualifying School graduates
- 2009 European Tour Qualifying School graduates
- List of golfers with most Challenge Tour wins
