= Warren Bennett (golfer) =

English professional golfer

Personal information
- Nationality: England
- Born: 20 August 1971 (age 55) Ashford, Surrey, England
- Height: 6 ft 3 in (1.91 m)
- Weight: 192 lb (87 kg; 13.7 st)
- Spouse: Angela (m. 2000)
- Children: 1

Career
- Sport: Golf
- Turned professional: 1994
- Former tours: European Tour; Challenge Tour; PGA EuroPro Tour
- Professional wins: 11
- Highest ranking: 87 (6 January 2002)

Number of wins by tour
- European Tour: 1
- Challenge Tour: 7 (Tied-2nd all-time)
- Other: 3

Best results in major championships
- Masters Tournament: DNP
- PGA Championship: DNP
- U.S. Open: DNP
- The Open Championship: T40: 1995

Achievements and awards
- Challenge Tour Rankings winner: 1998

Warren Bennett (born 20 August 1971) is an English professional golfer.

== Early life and amateur career ==
Bennett was born in Ashford, Surrey and is the son of footballer Peter Bennett. In 1994, he won the Australian Amateur and was the leading amateur at The Open Championship.

== Professional career ==
In 1994, Bennett turned professional. Bennett failed to win a European Tour card at Qualifying School in either 1994 or 1995, and missed much of 1996 with a twisted vertebrae.

In 1998, he headed the second tier Challenge Tour rankings having won five tournaments during the season, increasing his career tally at that level to seven. From 1999 to 2004 he played on the European Tour, winning his only European Tour title at the 1999 Scottish PGA Championship, but he continued to be troubled by injuries. In 2005, he played only a few events, most of them on the Challenge Tour. Bennett's best year-end ranking on the European Order of Merit was 29th in 2001.

Having suffered a hand injury in a car accident, Bennett resigned from the European Tour at the start of 2009. He has since become a caddie initially for Bernd Wiesberger, and later for Trish Johnson on the Ladies European Tour.

In 2017 he was appointed club professional at Chestfield Golf Club in Kent and left at the end of 2023.

== Amateur wins ==
- 1992 British Youths Open Amateur Championship
- 1994 Australian Amateur, Lytham Trophy

== Professional wins (11) ==
=== European Tour wins (1) ===
No.	Date	Tournament	Winning score	Margin of victory	Runner-up
1	30 Aug 1999	Scottish PGA Championship	−6 (70-69-74-69=282)	Playoff	(Netherlands) Rolf Muntz

European Tour playoff record (1–1)

No.	Year	Tournament	Opponent	Result
1	1999	Scottish PGA Championship	(Netherlands) Rolf Muntz	Won with birdie on first extra hole
2	2001	TNT Dutch Open	(Germany) Bernhard Langer	Lost to par on first extra hole

=== Challenge Tour wins (7) ===
No.	Date	Tournament	Winning score	Margin of victory	Runner(s)-up
1	20 Aug 1995	Steelcover Dutch Challenge Open	−12 (68-71-70-67=276)	Playoff	(Spain) Francisco Valera
2	21 Sep 1997	Eulen Open Galea	−17 (67-72-65-67=271)	9 strokes	(France) Nicolas Joakimides, (Australia) Stephen Leaney, (France) Antoine Lebouc, (Spain) Tomás Jesús Muñoz, (Sweden) Per Nyman, (Spain) Juan Quirós
3	31 May 1998	Challenge de France	−16 (69-70-65-68=272)	Playoff	(England) Scott Watson
4	12 Jul 1998	BTC Slovenian Open	−22 (65-66-69-70=270)	3 strokes	(Sweden) Mikael Lundberg, (France) Marc Pendariès
5	19 Jul 1998	Open des Volcans	−11 (69-65-70-73=277)	3 strokes	(Netherlands) Robert-Jan Derksen, (France) Grégory Havret (a), (Scotland) Euan Little
6	2 Aug 1998	Challenge Tour Championship	−12 (67-70-71-68=276)	2 strokes	(England) John Bickerton
7	16 Aug 1998	Moscow Country Club Russian Open	−18 (68-71-67-64=270)	7 strokes	(Sweden) Max Anglert, (Argentina) Ricardo González

Challenge Tour playoff record (2–1)

No.	Year	Tournament	Opponent	Result
1	1995	Steelcover Dutch Challenge Open	(Spain) Francisco Valera	Won with par on second extra hole
2	1998	Challenge de France	(England) Scott Watson	Won with par on second extra hole
3	1998	AXA Grand Final	(Argentina) Jorge Berendt	Lost to birdie on fourth extra hole

=== Jamega Pro Golf Tour wins (3) ===
No.	Date	Tournament	Winning score	Margin of victory	Runner(s)-up
1	24 Sep 2012	Mentmore (Rosebery)	−4 (68)	1 stroke	(England) Martin Sell, (England) Rob Watkins
2	23 Apr 2013	Essendon	−7 (70-67=137)	1 stroke	(England) Chris Hanson
3	14 May 2013	The Warwickshire - Kings	−11 (66-67=133)	4 strokes	(Wales) Mark Laskey

== Results in major championships ==
Tournament	1994	1995	1996	1997	1998	1999
The Open Championship	T72LA	T40				CUT

Tournament	2000	2001	2002	2003	2004	2005	2006	2007	2008	2009
The Open Championship			T50							

Tournament	2010	2011	2012
The Open Championship			T77

Note: Bennett only played in The Open Championship.

Did not play

LA = Low amateur
CUT = missed the half-way cut
"T" = tied

== Team appearances ==
- European Amateur Team Championship (representing England): 1993
- Eisenhower Trophy (representing Great Britain & Ireland): 1994
- St Andrews Trophy (representing Great Britain & Ireland): 1994 (winners)

== See also ==
- 2006 European Tour Qualifying School graduates
- List of golfers with most Challenge Tour wins
