= 1999 Challenge Tour =

Golf tour season

1999 Challenge Tour season
- Duration: 11 March 1999 – 24 October 1999
- Number of official events: 28
- Most wins: (Spain) Carl Suneson (3)
- Rankings: (Spain) Carl Suneson

The 1999 Challenge Tour was the 11th season of the Challenge Tour, the official development tour to the European Tour.

== Schedule ==
The following table lists official events during the 1999 season.

Date	Tournament	Host country	Purse (€)	Winner (Note: The number in brackets after each winner's name is the number of Challenge Tour events they had won up to and including that tournament. This information is only shown for Challenge Tour members. It is rare for someone to accumulate many wins on the Challenge Tour as success at this level usually leads to promotion to the European Tour.)	OWGR points	Other tours (Note: EUR − European Tour.)	Notes
14 Mar	Tusker Kenya Open	Kenya	91,000	(Netherlands) Maarten Lafeber (1)	n/a		
27 Mar	OKI Telepizza Challenge	Spain	63,000	(Wales) David Park (2)	n/a		New tournament
18 Apr	Open de Côte d'Ivoire	Ivory Coast	70,000	(England) Ian Poulter (1)	n/a		
2 May	Comunitat Valenciana Challenge de España	Spain	91,000	(Spain) Carl Suneson (2)	n/a		New tournament
16 May	BIL Luxembourg Open	Luxembourg	63,000	(United States) Kevin Carissimi (4)	n/a		New tournament
23 May	Open dei Tessali	Italy	63,000	(Argentina) Gustavo Rojas (1)	n/a		
30 May	Challenge de Sablé	France	70,000	(Australia) Lucas Parsons (1)	n/a		New tournament
13 Jun	NCC Open	Sweden	63,000	(Sweden) Per G. Nyman (1)	n/a		
13 Jun	Diners Club Austrian Open	Austria	77,000	(Switzerland) Juan Ciola (1)	n/a		
27 Jun	Is Molas Challenge	Italy	63,000	(Wales) Bradley Dredge (2)	n/a		
4 Jul	Neuchâtel Open Golf Trophy	Switzerland	63,000	(Sweden) Richard S. Johnson (1)	n/a		Invitational event
4 Jul	Open des Volcans	France	70,000	(England) Philip Golding (3)	n/a		
11 Jul	Volvo Finnish Open	Finland	70,000	(Sweden) Paul Nilbrink (1)	n/a		
18 Jul	Rolex Trophy	Switzerland	70,000	(Spain) Carl Suneson (3)	n/a		Invitational event
18 Jul	BTC Slovenian Open	Slovenia	70,000	(Australia) Grant Dodd (1)	n/a		
1 Aug	Finnish Masters	Finland	112,000	(Australia) Lucas Parsons (2)	n/a		
8 Aug	Beazer Homes Challenge Tour Championship	England	112,000	(Spain) Carl Suneson (4)	n/a		
15 Aug	West of Ireland Golf Classic	Ireland	350,000	(Italy) Costantino Rocca (2)	24	EUR	New tournament
22 Aug	BMW Russian Open	Russia	£90,000	(England) Iain Pyman (1)	n/a		
22 Aug	Norwegian Open	Norway	63,000	(Sweden) Pehr Magnebrant (2)	n/a		
3 Sep	Formby Hall Challenge	England	70,000	(Scotland) Greig Hutcheon (1)	n/a		
5 Sep	Öhrlings Swedish Matchplay	Sweden	63,000	(Sweden) Kalle Brink (2)	n/a		
11 Sep	Daewoo Warsaw Golf Open	Poland	100,000	(Sweden) Niclas Fasth (4)	n/a		
3 Oct	Gula Sidorna Grand Prix	Sweden	120,000	(Sweden) Raimo Sjöberg (1)	n/a		
9 Oct	San Paolo Vita Open	Italy	70,000	(Italy) Alberto Binaghi (2)	n/a		
10 Oct	Philips Challenge Xacobeo 99	Spain	80,000	(South Africa) Hennie Otto (1)	n/a		New tournament
17 Oct	Challenge de France Bayer	France	114,000	(England) Iain Pyman (2)	n/a		
24 Oct	Cuba European Challenge Tour Grand Final	Cuba	105,000	(New Zealand) Stephen Scahill (2)	n/a		Tour Championship

== Rankings ==
The rankings were based on prize money won during the season, calculated in Euros. The top 15 players on the rankings earned status to play on the 2000 European Tour.

Rank	Player	Prize money (€)
1	(Spain) Carl Suneson	69,641
2	(England) Iain Pyman	56,993
3	(Austria) Markus Brier	50,184
4	(Argentina) Gustavo Rojas	47,953
5	(New Zealand) Stephen Scahill	47,583
