= Euan Little =

Scottish golfer

Personal information
- Nationality: Scotland
- Born: 28 April 1976 (age 50) Dumfries, Scotland
- Height: 1.88 m (6 ft 2 in)
- Weight: 95 kg (209 lb; 15.0 st)

Career
- Sport: Golf
- College: Midland College
- Turned professional: 1996
- Former tours: European Tour; Challenge Tour
- Professional wins: 2

Number of wins by tour
- Challenge Tour: 2

Best results in major championships
- Masters Tournament: DNP
- PGA Championship: DNP
- U.S. Open: DNP
- The Open Championship: CUT: 2003, 2004

Euan Little (born 28 April 1976) is a Scottish professional golfer.

== Career ==
Little turned professional in 1996 having represented Scotland as an amateur. Having reached the final stage of qualifying school that year, he played qualified for the Challenge Tour and played steadily at that level for the next five seasons, finishing runner-up twice, before claiming his first win in 2001 at the Segura Viudas Challenge de España. At the end of 2001 Little returned to the qualifying school and gained a place on the European Tour for 2002. After a difficult first season he returned successfully to the school in 2003, but once again failed to retain his status, despite recording a second Challenge Tour win, and returned to the Challenge Tour full-time for 2004. In recent years Little's form has slumped further, and he has made only occasional appearances on either tour since 2008.

Since 2009, Little has been the head professional at Dundrum House Golf Club in Ireland.

== Amateur wins ==
- 1995 Scottish Youths Amateur Championship
- 1996 Scottish Youths Amateur Championship

== Professional wins (2) ==
=== Challenge Tour wins (2) ===
No.	Date	Tournament	Winning score	Margin of victory	Runner-up
1	1 Apr 2001	Segura Viudas Challenge de España	−11 (72-69-68-68=277)	1 stroke	(Spain) Jesús María Arruti
2	21 Sep 2003	Telia Grand Prix	−8 (65-71-71-69=276)	2 strokes	(England) Robert Coles

Challenge Tour playoff record (0–1)

No.	Year	Tournament	Opponents	Result
1	1998	Navision Open Golf Championship	(Denmark) René Budde, (Denmark) Søren Hansen	Hansen won with par on first extra hole

== Results in major championships ==
Tournament	2003	2004
The Open Championship	CUT	CUT

Note: Little only played in The Open Championship.
CUT = missed the half-way cut
