= Challenge Tour Grand Final =

Grand Final
Tournament information
- Location: Port d'Alcúdia, Mallorca, Spain
- Established: 1995
- Course: Club de Golf Alcanada
- Par: 72
- Length: 7,128 yards (6,518 m)
- Tour: Challenge Tour
- Format: Stroke play
- Prize fund: €500,000
- Month played: October/November

Tournament record score
- Aggregate: 265 Espen Kofstad (2012); 265 Kristoffer Reitan (2024)
- To par: −23 Kristoffer Reitan (2024)

Current champion
- (France) Julien Sale

Location map
- Location in Spain Location in the Balearic Islands Location in Mallorca

The Challenge Tour Grand Final is the season-ending tour championship on the Challenge Tour. The field currently consists of the top 45 players on the Challenge Tour rankings vying for twenty European Tour cards. It has been played annually since 1995. Initially it was played in Portugal, but has since been held in Cuba, France, Italy, the United Arab Emirates, Oman and Spain.

Since 2010, the Challenge Tour Grand Final has been designated by the Official World Golf Ranking as the Challenge Tour's flagship event. Initially awarding a minimum of 16 ranking points to the winner, compared to 12 for most events, this was increased to 17 points in 2014.

== Venues ==
| Venue | Location | First | Last | Times |
|---|---|---|---|---|
| Quinta do Peru | Sesimbra, Portugal | 1995 | 1996 | 2 |
| Clube de Golf do Montado | Setúbal, Portugal | 1997 | 1997 | 1 |
| Belas Clube de Campo | Sintra, Portugal | 1998 | 1998 | 1 |
| Varadero Golf Club | Varadero, Cuba | 1999 | 2000 | 2 |
| Golf du Médoc | Bordeaux, France | 2001 | 2004 | 4 |
| San Domenico Golf | Apulia, Italy | 2005 | 2012 | 8 |
| Al Badia Golf Club | Dubai, UAE | 2013 | 2014 | 2 |
| Al Mouj Golf | Muscat, Oman | 2015 | 2017 | 3 |
| Al Hamra Golf Club | Ras Al Khaimah, UAE | 2018 | 2018 | 1 |
| Club de Golf Alcanada | Port d'Alcúdia, Spain | 2019 | 2025 | 5 |
| T-Golf & Country Club | Calvià, Spain | 2020 | 2021 | 2 |

== Winners ==
| Challenge Tour (Flagship event) | 2010–2021 |
| Challenge Tour (Tour Championship) | 1995–2009, 2022– |

| # | Year | Winner | Score | To par | Margin of victory | Runner(s)-up | Venue |
Grand Final
| 32nd | 2026 | (France) Julien Sale | 266 | −22 | 4 strokes | (Denmark) Hamish Brown | Alcanada |
Rolex Grand Final
| 31st | 2025 | (England) James Morrison | 273 | −15 | 3 strokes | (Italy) Stefano Mazzoli | Alcanada |
Rolex Challenge Tour Grand Final
| 30th | 2024 | (Norway) Kristoffer Reitan | 265 | −23 | 1 stroke | (Spain) Ángel Ayora (Denmark) Rasmus Neergaard-Petersen | Alcanada |
| 29th | 2023 | (England) Marco Penge | 278 | −10 | 6 strokes | (France) Tom Vaillant | Alcanada |
| 28th | 2022 | (England) Nathan Kimsey | 279 | −9 | 1 stroke | (South Africa) Bryce Easton (England) John Parry | Alcanada |
| 27th | 2021 | (Denmark) Marcus Helligkilde | 276 | −8 | 1 stroke | (France) Julien Brun (Portugal) Ricardo Gouveia (France) Frédéric Lacroix (Germany) Yannik Paul | T-Golf |
Challenge Tour Grand Final
| 26th | 2020 | (Czech Republic) Ondřej Lieser | 273 | −11 | 1 stroke | (Sweden) Christofer Blomstrand (Germany) Alexander Knappe (Spain) Santiago Tarrío | T-Golf |
| 25th | 2019 | (Italy) Francesco Laporta | 278 | −6 | 2 strokes | (Germany) Sebastian Heisele (France) Robin Sciot-Siegrist | Alcanada |
Ras Al Khaimah Challenge Tour Grand Final
| 24th | 2018 | (Spain) Adri Arnaus | 271 | −17 | 1 stroke | (France) Victor Perez | Al Hamra |
NBO Golf Classic Grand Final
| 23rd | 2017 | (France) Clément Sordet | 273 | −15 | 2 strokes | (Sweden) Marcus Kinhult | Al Mouj Golf |
| 22nd | 2016 | (Germany) Bernd Ritthammer | 267 | −21 | 1 stroke | (Sweden) Jens Dantorp | Al Mouj Golf |
| 21st | 2015 | (Portugal) Ricardo Gouveia | 275 | −13 | 1 stroke | (Denmark) Joachim B. Hansen | Al Mouj Golf |
Dubai Festival City Challenge Tour Grand Final
| 20th | 2014 | (France) Benjamin Hébert | 276 | −12 | 5 strokes | (France) Jérôme Lando-Casanova | Al Badia |
| 19th | 2013 | (India) Shiv Kapur | 272 | −16 | 4 strokes | (Portugal) José-Filipe Lima (Scotland) Jamie McLeary | Al Badia |
Apulia San Domenico Grand Final
| 18th | 2012 | (Norway) Espen Kofstad | 265 | −19 | 1 stroke | (England) James Busby (Denmark) Joachim B. Hansen | San Domenico Golf |
| 17th | 2011 | (Italy) Andrea Pavan | 267 | −17 | 1 stroke | (England) Tommy Fleetwood | San Domenico Golf |
| 16th | 2010 | (England) Matt Haines | 276 | −8 | 1 stroke | (Australia) Daniel Gaunt | San Domenico Golf |
| 15th | 2009 | (Scotland) Peter Whiteford | 279 | −5 | Playoff | (Australia) Andrew Tampion | San Domenico Golf |
| 14th | 2008 | (Argentina) Estanislao Goya | 267 | −17 | 1 stroke | (England) Richard Bland (England) John E. Morgan | San Domenico Golf |
| 13th | 2007 | (France) Mike Lorenzo-Vera | 269 | −15 | 1 stroke | (Wales) Jamie Donaldson (Netherlands) Joost Luiten (Wales) Stuart Manley (Scotland) Eric Ramsay | San Domenico Golf |
| 12th | 2006 | (England) James Hepworth | 271 | −13 | 2 strokes | (Argentina) Rafael Echenique (Sweden) Alex Norén (Wales) Mark Pilkington | San Domenico Golf |
| 11th | 2005 | (Spain) Carl Suneson | 273 | −15 | 1 stroke | (Argentina) Daniel Vancsik (Scotland) Marc Warren | San Domenico Golf |
Bouygues Telecom Grand Final
| 10th | 2004 | (Scotland) David Drysdale | 271 | −13 | Playoff | (Sweden) Mattias Eliasson | Golf du Médoc |
Challenge Tour Grand Final
| 9th | 2003 | (Spain) José Manuel Carriles | 273 | −11 | Playoff | (Sweden) Johan Edfors | Golf du Médoc |
| 8th | 2002 | (Republic of Ireland) Peter Lawrie | 272 | −12 | 4 strokes | (France) Julien van Hauwe | Golf du Médoc |
| 7th | 2001 | (England) Richard Bland | 266 | −18 | 5 strokes | (England) Philip Golding | Golf du Médoc |
Cuba Challenge Tour Grand Final
| 6th | 2000 | (Sweden) Henrik Stenson | 270 | −18 | 5 strokes | (Sweden) Mikael Lundberg (England) Andrew Raitt (Italy) Michele Reale | Varadero |
Cuba European Challenge Tour Grand Final
| 5th | 1999 | (New Zealand) Stephen Scahill | 277 | −11 | 2 strokes | (Spain) José Manuel Lara (Sweden) Henrik Stenson | Varadero |
AXA Grand Final
| 4th | 1998 | (Argentina) Jorge Berendt | 275 | −13 | Playoff | (England) Warren Bennett | Belas Clube de Campo |
Estoril Grand Final
| 3rd | 1997 | (France) Nicolas Joakimides | 198 (Note: Shortened to 54 holes due to weather.) | −18 | 1 stroke | (Sweden) Mikael Lundberg | Clube de Golf do Montado |
UAP Grand Final
| 2nd | 1996 | (England) Ian Garbutt | 272 | −16 | 2 strokes | (England) Van Phillips (Denmark) Ben Tinning | Quinta do Peru |
| 1st | 1995 | (Spain) Francisco Valera | 275 | −13 | 1 stroke | (France) Tim Planchin | Quinta do Peru |
