= Raimo Sjöberg =

Swedish golfer

Personal information
- Nationality: Sweden
- Born: 25 September 1970 (age 56) Stockholm, Sweden
- Height: 1.80 m (5 ft 11 in)
- Weight: 90 kg (200 lb; 14 st)

Career
- Sport: Golf
- Turned professional: 1990
- Former tour: Challenge Tour
- Professional wins: 3

Number of wins by tour
- Challenge Tour: 1
- Other: 2

Achievements and awards
- Danish Golf Tour Order of Merit winner: 2005

Raimo Sjöberg (born 25 September 1970) is a Swedish professional golfer.

On the Challenge Tour, Sjöberg won the 1999 Gula Sidorna Grand Prix and finished runner-up at the 2002 Challenge de Espana, the 1998 Warsaw Golf Open and the 1995 Lomas Bosque Challenge.

Sjöberg played 23 events on the European Tour where his best performance was a tie for fifth at the 2000 Madeira Island Open.

== Professional wins (3) ==
=== Challenge Tour wins (1) ===
No.	Date	Tournament	Winning score	Margin of victory	Runner-up
1	3 Oct 1999	Gula Sidorna Grand Prix	−8 (69-72-67=208)	2 strokes	(Sweden) Klas Eriksson

=== Nordic Golf League wins (2) ===
No.	Date	Tournament	Winning score	Margin of victory	Runner-up
1	5 Sep 2005	Base1 Open	−14 (71-67-64=202)	5 strokes	(Sweden) Fredrik Söderström
2	9 Sep 2005	Bornholm Open	−10 (73-68-65=206)	Playoff	(Sweden) Fredrik Ohlsson

== Team appearances ==
Amateur

- Jacques Léglise Trophy (representing the Continent of Europe): 1988
- European Amateur Team Championship (representing Sweden): 1989
