= List of golfers with most Challenge Tour wins =

This is a list of golfers who have won four or more official money events on the Challenge Tour since it was established in 1986 as published in the tour's media guide. Many of the players on the list have won events on other tours and unofficial events.

This list is up to date through the 2025 season.

Rank	Player	Lifespan	Wins	Winning span
1	(England) Iain Pyman	1973–	8	1999–2008
T2	(England) Warren Bennett	1971–	7	1995–1998
T2	(Portugal) Ricardo Gouveia	1991–	7	2014–2023
T2	(South Africa) J. C. Ritchie	1994–	7	2020–2025
T5	(France) Benjamin Hébert	1987–	6	2011–2014
T5	(Sweden) Adam Mednick	1966–	6	1990–2002
T5	(Spain) Carl Suneson	1967–	6	1995–2007
T8	(Sweden) Dennis Edlund	1965–	5	1993–2000
T8	(Sweden) Klas Eriksson	1971–	5	1993–2008
T8	(Sweden) Fredrik Henge	1974–	5	1997–2004
T8	(England) Lee S. James	1973–	5	1996–2009
T8	(Portugal) José-Filipe Lima	1981–	5	2004–2019
T8	(England) Sam Little	1975–	5	2001–2011
T8	(Italy) Edoardo Molinari	1981–	5	2007–2009
T8	(Italy) Andrea Pavan	1989–	5	2011–2023
T8	(England) Jeremy Robinson	1966–	5	1989–1992
T8	(France) Clément Sordet	1992–	5	2015–2022
T8	(England) Sam Walker	1978–	5	2006–2016
T17	(Sweden) Kristoffer Broberg	1986–	4	2012
T17	(United States) Kevin Carissimi	1969–	4	1996–1999
T17	(Germany) Alex Čejka	1970–	4	1991–2002
T17	(Wales) Rhys Davies	1985–	4	2009–2015
T17	(Spain) Nacho Elvira	1987–	4	2013–2015
T17	(Sweden) Niclas Fasth	1972–	4	1993–1999
T17	(England) Nick Godin	1961–	4	1989–1992
T17	(Sweden) Peter Hedblom	1970–	4	1990–2001
T17	(Northern Ireland) Michael Hoey	1979–	4	2005–2011
T17	(England) Simon D. Hurley	1963–	4	1989–1995
T17	(Germany) Alexander Knappe	1989–	4	2016–2022
T17	(United States) Brooks Koepka	1990–	4	2012–2013
T17	(Norway) Espen Kofstad	1987–	4	2012–2021
T17	(Sweden) Mikael Krantz	1965–	4	1991–1992
T17	(Sweden) Mats Lanner	1961–	4	1989–1998
T17	(Sweden) Fredrik Larsson	1968–	4	1991–1993
T17	(Wales) Mark Litton	1962–	4	1992–1997
T17	(Wales) Stuart Manley	1979–	4	2013–2023
T17	(Sweden) Per Nyman	1968–	4	1993–1995
T17	(England) John Parry	1986–	4	2009–2024
T17	(Germany) Erol Şimşek	1971–	4	1996–1997
T17	(Italy) Alessandro Tadini	1973–	4	2004–2012
T17	(Austria) Martin Wiegele	1978–	4	2007–2017

== See also ==
- List of golfers to achieve a three-win promotion from the Challenge Tour
