= 2000 Challenge Tour =

Golf tour season

2000 Challenge Tour season
- Duration: 17 February 2000 – 5 November 2000
- Number of official events: 23
- Most wins: (Republic of Ireland) David Higgins (3) (Sweden) Henrik Stenson (3)
- Rankings: (Sweden) Henrik Stenson

The 2000 Challenge Tour was the 12th season of the Challenge Tour, the official development tour to the European Tour.

== Schedule ==
The following table lists official events during the 2000 season.

Date	Tournament	Host country	Purse (€)	Winner (Note: The number in brackets after each winner's name is the number of Challenge Tour events they had won up to and including that tournament. This information is only shown for Challenge Tour members. It is rare for someone to accumulate many wins on the Challenge Tour as success at this level usually leads to promotion to the European Tour.)	OWGR points	Other tours (Note: EUR − European Tour.)	Notes
20 Feb	Challenge de España	Spain	78,000	(Sweden) Eric Carlberg (2)	6		
12 Mar	Tusker Kenya Open	Kenya	£70,000	(South Africa) Trevor Immelman (1)	6		
7 May	Credit Suisse Private Banking Open	Switzerland	£60,000	(Spain) Álvaro Salto (2)	6		New tournament
14 May	Costa Blanca Challenge	Spain	80,000	(Sweden) Johan Ryström (3)	6		New tournament
28 May	Muermans Real Estate Challenge Open	Netherlands	120,000	(France) Richard Gillot (1)	6		
4 Jun	Danish Open	Denmark	95,000	(Sweden) Fredrik Henge (3)	6		
11 Jun	NCC Open	Sweden	SKr 750,000	(Republic of Ireland) David Higgins (1)	6		
11 Jun	Aa St Omer Open	France	1,000,000 F	(France) Pascal Edmond (1)	6		New to Challenge Tour
25 Jun	DEXIA-BIL Luxembourg Open	Luxembourg	80,000	(Sweden) Henrik Stenson (1)	6		
2 Jul	Open des Volcans	France	600,000 F	(France) Renaud Guillard (1)	6		
9 Jul	Volvo Finnish Open	Finland	80,000	(South Africa) Jean Hugo (1)	6		
23 Jul	Günther Hamburg Classic	Germany	£150,000	(Republic of Ireland) David Higgins (2)	6		
30 Jul	Beazer Homes Challenge Tour Championship	England	£90,000	(England) Shaun P. Webster (1)	6		
6 Aug	BMW Russian Open	Russia	£100,000	(Italy) Marco Bernardini (1)	6		
13 Aug	Finnish Masters	Finland	132,500	(France) Christian Cévaër (3)	6		
20 Aug	Norwegian Open	Norway	£50,000	(Sweden) Paul Nilbrink (2)	6		
20 Aug	Buzzgolf.com North West of Ireland Open	Ireland	350,000	(Italy) Massimo Scarpa (3)	24	EUR	
27 Aug	Rolex Trophy	Switzerland	CHF 150,000	(Republic of Ireland) David Higgins (3)	6		
2 Sep	Formby Hall Challenge	England	£55,000	(Sweden) Fredrik Henge (4)	6		
10 Sep	Tessali Open del Sud	Italy	78,000	(England) Kenneth Ferrie (1)	6		
17 Sep	Gula Sidorna Grand Prix	Sweden	SKr 1,100,000	(Sweden) Henrik Stenson (2)	6		
7 Oct	San Paolo Vita Open	Italy	78,000	(Sweden) Dennis Edlund (5)	6		
15 Oct	Le Touquet Challenge de France	France	122,000	(Sweden) Fredrik Andersson (2)	6		
5 Nov	Cuba Challenge Tour Grand Final	Cuba	US$128,000	(Sweden) Henrik Stenson (3)	6		Tour Championship

=== Unofficial events ===
The following events were sanctioned by the Challenge Tour, but did not carry official money, wins were still official however.

Date	Tournament	Host country	Purse (€)	Winner	OWGR points	Notes
25 Jun	Memorial Olivier Barras	Switzerland	63,000	(Italy) Adriano Mori (1)	n/a	
2 Jul	UBS Warburg Swiss Golf Open Neuchâtel	Switzerland	63,000	(Switzerland) Steve Rey (2)	n/a	

== Rankings ==
The rankings were based on prize money won during the season, calculated in Euros. The top 15 players on the rankings earned status to play on the 2001 European Tour.

Rank	Player	Prize money (€)
1	(Sweden) Henrik Stenson	108,710
2	(Republic of Ireland) David Higgins	81,040
3	(Spain) Carlos Rodiles	71,679
4	(Sweden) Mikael Lundberg	71,607
5	(Italy) Michele Reale	52,978
