= Rolf Muntz =

Dutch professional golfer (born 1969)

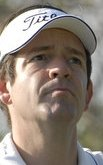

Personal information
- Full name: Rolf Frederick Cornelis Muntz
- Nationality: Netherlands
- Born: 26 March 1969 (age 57) Voorschoten, Netherlands
- Height: 1.91 m (6 ft 3 in)
- Weight: 86 kg (190 lb; 13.5 st)

Career
- Sport: Golf
- Turned professional: 1993
- Former tours: European Tour; Sunshine Tour; Challenge Tour
- Professional wins: 7

Number of wins by tour
- European Tour: 1
- Challenge Tour: 2

Best results in major championships
- Masters Tournament: CUT: 1991
- PGA Championship: DNP
- U.S. Open: DNP
- The Open Championship: CUT: 1990, 1991, 2003

Rolf Frederick Cornelis Muntz (born 26 March 1969) is a Dutch professional golfer.

== Career ==
In 1969, Muntz was born in Voorschoten. As an amateur, he won three Dutch Amateur Championships and two Dutch Stroke Play Championships and became the first Dutchman to win The Amateur Championship. He also represented the Netherlands in the Eisenhower Trophy in 1990 and 1992 before quitting his law and psychology studies at Leiden University to turn professional in 1993.

Muntz began his career on the second tier Challenge Tour in 1994, finishing 13th on the end of season rankings, and picking up his first title. At the end of that year, he qualified for the elite European Tour for 1995 at final qualifying school. Having had to return to qualifying school at the end of his rookie season, where he was again successful, he maintained his status on the tour through the 2004 season through his position on the Order of Merit.

In 1999 Muntz came close to his first European Tour victory when he lost to Warren Bennett in a play-off for the Scottish PGA Championship. The following season he won the Qatar Masters to become the first Dutchman to win a European Tour event since the tour was founded in 1972 and the first to win a top level European professional tournament since Joop Rühl won the 1947 Dutch Open.

Muntz has also played on the Sunshine Tour and represented the Netherlands in the WGC-World Cup in 1999.

== Amateur wins ==
- 1990 The Amateur Championship, Dutch Amateur Championship
- 1991 Dutch Amateur Championship, Dutch Stroke Play Championship
- 1992 Dutch Amateur Championship
- 1993 Dutch Stroke Play Championship

== Professional wins (7) ==
=== European Tour wins (1) ===
No.	Date	Tournament	Winning score	Margin of victory	Runner-up
1	12 Mar 2000	Qatar Masters	−8 (68-73-67-72=280)	5 strokes	(Wales) Ian Woosnam

European Tour playoff record (0–1)

No.	Year	Tournament	Opponent	Result
1	1999	Scottish PGA Championship	(England) Warren Bennett	Lost to birdie on first extra hole

=== Challenge Tour wins (2) ===
No.	Date	Tournament	Winning score	Margin of victory	Runners-up
1	3 Jul 1994	Neuchâtel Open SBS Trophy	−14 (67-67-65=199)	1 stroke	(England) Neal Briggs, (England) Philip Talbot, (Sweden) Daniel Westermark
2	5 Jun 1995	Challenge Chargeurs	−20 (65-69-69-65=268)	6 strokes	(France) Éric Giraud, (Germany) Heinz-Peter Thül

=== Other wins (4) ===
- 1994 Nedcar National Open (Netherlands)
- 1995 Nedcar National Open, Muermans Vastgoed Cup (both Netherlands)
- 2008 Ricoh National Open (Netherlands)

== Results in major championships ==
Tournament	1990	1991	1992	1993	1994	1995	1996	1997	1998	1999
Masters Tournament		CUT								
The Open Championship	CUT	CUT								

Tournament	2000	2001	2002	2003
Masters Tournament				
The Open Championship				CUT

Note: Muntz never played in the U.S. Open or the PGA Championship.

Did not play

CUT = missed the half-way cut

== Team appearances ==
Amateur

- European Amateur Team Championship (representing the Netherlands): 1991, 1993
- St Andrews Trophy (representing the Continent of Europe): 1990, 1992
- Eisenhower Trophy (representing the Netherlands): 1990, 1992

Professional

- World Cup (representing the Netherlands): 1995
