= 1998 Challenge Tour =

Golf tour season

1998 Challenge Tour season
- Duration: 5 March 1998 – 24 October 1998
- Number of official events: 30
- Most wins: (England) Warren Bennett (5)
- Rankings: (England) Warren Bennett

The 1998 Challenge Tour was the 10th season of the Challenge Tour, the official development tour to the European Tour.

== Schedule ==
The following table lists official events during the 1998 season.

Date	Tournament	Host country	Purse (£)	Winner (Note: The number in brackets after each winner's name is the number of Challenge Tour events they had won up to and including that tournament. This information is only shown for Challenge Tour members. It is rare for someone to accumulate many wins on the Challenge Tour as success at this level usually leads to promotion to the European Tour.)	Notes
8 Mar	Open de Côte d'Ivoire	Ivory Coast	70,000	(England) John Mellor (1)	
15 Mar	Tusker Kenya Open	Kenya	65,000	(Argentina) Ricardo González (2)	
5 Apr	Is Molas Challenge	Italy	40,000	(Sweden) Magnus Persson (3)	
25 Apr	Rimini International Open	Italy	65,000	(Italy) Massimo Scarpa (1)	New tournament
16 May	Albarella International Open	Italy	40,000	(Sweden) Fredrik Lindgren (2)	New tournament
24 May	Modena Classic Open	Italy	40,000	(France) Marc Pendariès (1)	
31 May	Challenge de France	France	50,000	(England) Warren Bennett (3)	New tournament
7 Jun	KB Golf Challenge	Czech Republic	40,000	(Scotland) Stephen Gallacher (1)	
14 Jun	Diners Club Austrian Open	Austria	55,000	(United States) Kevin Carissimi (2)	
14 Jun	NCC Open	Sweden	40,000	(Sweden) Johan Ryström (2)	
27 Jun	Osmanli Bankasi Klassis Turkish Open	Turkey	60,000	(Norway) Thomas Nielsen (1)	
28 Jun	Open dei Tessali	Italy	40,000	(Sweden) Pehr Magnebrant (1)	
3 Jul	MasterCard Challenge	England	40,000	(England) Robert Lee (2)	
5 Jul	Audi Quattro Trophy	Germany	55,000	(Italy) Marcello Santi (2)	
12 Jul	BTC Slovenian Open	Slovenia	45,000	(England) Warren Bennett (4)	
12 Jul	Volvo Finnish Open	Finland	40,000	(France) Christian Cévaër (2)	
19 Jul	Rolex Trophy	Switzerland	50,000	(Wales) David Park (1)	
19 Jul	Open des Volcans	France	50,000	(England) Warren Bennett (5)	
26 Jul	Interlaken Open	Switzerland	75,000	(Australia) John Senden (1)	
2 Aug	Challenge Tour Championship	England	80,000	(England) Warren Bennett (6)	
9 Aug	Finnish Masters	Finland	80,000	(Italy) Massimo Scarpa (2)	New tournament
16 Aug	Moscow Country Club Russian Open	Russia	90,000	(England) Warren Bennett (7)	
23 Aug	Netcom Norwegian Open	Norway	80,000	(England) Gary Emerson (1)	
30 Aug	Navision Open Golf Championship	Denmark	40,000	(Denmark) Søren Hansen (1)	
6 Sep	Öhrlings Swedish Matchplay	Sweden	45,000	(United States) Kevin Carissimi (3)	
6 Sep	Open de Strasbourg	France	45,000	(Australia) John Senden (2)	New tournament
13 Sep	Warsaw Golf Open	Poland	55,000	(Spain) José Manuel Lara (1)	
27 Sep	Eulen Open Galea	Spain	60,000	(Spain) Álvaro Salto (1)	
4 Oct	Telia Grand Prix	Sweden	85,000	(Sweden) Mats Lanner (4)	
10 Oct	San Paolo Vita Open	Italy	45,000	(England) Roger Winchester (2)	
24 Oct	AXA Grand Final	Portugal	€75,000	(Argentina) Jorge Berendt (2)	Tour Championship

== Rankings ==
The rankings were based on prize money won during the season, calculated in Pound sterling. The top 15 players on the rankings earned status to play on the 1999 European Tour.

Rank	Player	Prize money (£)
1	(England) Warren Bennett	81,053
2	(Sweden) Per Nyman	37,196
3	(Italy) Massimo Scarpa	35,524
4	(England) Roger Winchester	33,796
5	(Argentina) Ricardo González	33,159

== See also ==
- 1998 Swedish Golf Tour
