= Dennis Edlund =

Swedish professional golfer

Personal information
- Full name: Dennis Edlund
- Nationality: Sweden
- Born: 24 September 1965 (age 61) Strängnäs, Sweden
- Height: 1.82 m (6 ft 0 in)

Career
- Sport: Golf
- Turned professional: 1988
- Former tours: European Tour; Challenge Tour; Swedish Golf Tour
- Professional wins: 7

Number of wins by tour
- Challenge Tour: 5 (Tied-8th all-time)
- Other: 2

Best results in major championships
- Masters Tournament: DNP
- PGA Championship: DNP
- U.S. Open: DNP
- The Open Championship: CUT: 1997

Dennis Edlund (born 24 September 1965) is a Swedish professional golfer.

== Career ==
In 1965, Edlund was born in Strängnäs.

Edlund turned professional in 1988. He played on the European Tour and its official development tour, the Challenge Tour, between 1990 and 2003. He won five times on the Challenge Tour, including twice in 1996, when he won the English Challenge Tour Championship and Rolex Trophy Pro-Am on his way to second place on the tour's end of season rankings. His best finishes on the European Tour were as runner-up at both the 1997 Alamo English Open and the 1998 Standard Life Loch Lomond.

== Amateur wins ==
- 1987 Biarittz Cup (France)

== Professional wins (7) ==
=== Challenge Tour wins (5) ===
No.	Date	Tournament	Winning score	Margin of victory	Runner(s)-up
1	18 Jul 1993	Open des Volcans	−12 (70-70-64-72=276)	1 stroke	(Spain) Ignacio Gervás, (Sweden) Peter Hedblom
2	28 May 1995	Compaq Open	−1 (72-71-73-71=287)	3 strokes	(Denmark) Thomas Bjørn, (Norway) Thomas Nielsen
3	4 Aug 1996	English Challenge Tour Championship	−6 (75-71-66-70=282)	1 stroke	(England) Rob Edwards
4	10 Aug 1996	Rolex Trophy Pro-Am	−14 (66-66-68-74=274)	Playoff	(England) Carl Watts
5	7 Oct 2000	San Paolo Vita Open	−15 (73-68-69-63=273)	1 stroke	(Italy) Marcelo Santi

=== Swedish Golf Tour wins (1) ===
No.	Date	Tournament	Winning score	Margin of victory	Runners-up
1	21 Aug 1988	Gevalia Open	−11 (73-66-67-71=277)	3 strokes	(Sweden) Per-Arne Brostedt, (Sweden) Peter Dahlberg

=== Other wins (1) ===
- 2007 Älvkarleby Open (Swedish mini-tour)

== Team appearances ==
Amateur

- European Amateur Team Championship (representing Sweden): 1987

== See also ==
- List of golfers with most Challenge Tour wins
