= Per Nyman =

Swedish professional golfer

Personal information
- Full name: Per Nyman
- Nationality: Sweden
- Born: 14 February 1968 (age 58) Kristianstad, Sweden
- Height: 1.78 m (5 ft 10 in)
- Weight: 74 kg (163 lb; 11.7 st)

Career
- Sport: Golf
- College: Fresno State University
- Turned professional: 1992
- Former tour: European Tour
- Professional wins: 5

Number of wins by tour
- Challenge Tour: 4
- Other: 1

Best results in major championships
- Masters Tournament: DNP
- PGA Championship: DNP
- U.S. Open: DNP
- The Open Championship: CUT: 1999

Per Nyman (born 14 February 1968) is a Swedish professional golfer.

== Early life and amateur career ==
In 1968, Nyman was born in Kristianstad, Sweden.

Nyman attended Fresno State University in California, United States, where he twice won the GCAA All-America Scholar Award. He graduated in 1992.

== Professional career ==
In 1992, he turned professional. He played on the European Tour and its official development tour, the Challenge Tour, between 1993 and 2004. He won four times on the Challenge Tour, including twice in 1995, and finished 2nd on the Challenge Tour Rankings in 1998. He was also medalist at the European Tour Qualifying School Final Stage in 2002.

He should not be confused with fellow professional golfer and two-time Challenge Tour winner Per G. Nyman.

== Professional wins (5) ==
=== Challenge Tour wins (4) ===
No.	Date	Tournament	Winning score	Margin of victory	Runner(s)-up
1	11 Jul 1993	Volvo Finnish Open	−8 (70-67-71=208)	2 strokes	(Sweden) Daniel Fornstam
2	7 Aug 1994	SM Match Play	1 up		(Sweden) Joakim Grönhagen
3	17 Sep 1995	Kentab Open	−8 (68-72-73=213)	1 stroke	(Sweden) Anders Gillner
4	29 Sep 1995	Lomas Bosque Challenge	−16 (71-69-67-65=272)	4 strokes	(England) Simon D. Hurley, (Spain) Manuel Moreno, (Sweden) Raimo Sjöberg

Challenge Tour playoff record (0–2)

No.	Year	Tournament	Opponent(s)	Result
1	1998	Rolex Trophy	(Wales) David Park	Lost to birdie on first extra hole
2	1998	Telia Grand Prix	(Denmark) Morten Backhausen, (Sweden) Mats Lanner	Lanner won with birdie on first extra hole

=== Swedish Golf Tour wins (1) ===
No.	Date	Tournament	Winning score	Margin of victory	Runners-up
1	18 Jun 1995	Husqvarna Open	−7 (62-69-72=203)	2 strokes	(Sweden) Terry Burgoyne, (Sweden) Mats Sterner

== Team appearances ==
Amateur

- European Amateur Team Championship (representing Sweden): 1989
- Eisenhower Trophy (representing Sweden): 1990 (winners)

== See also ==
- List of golfers with most Challenge Tour wins
