= Simon D. Hurley =

English golfer

Simon Hurley
Personal information
- Full name: Simon David Hurley
- Nationality: England
- Born: 7 December 1963 (age 62) Bristol, England
- Height: 6 ft 2 in (1.88 m)
- Weight: 210 lb (95 kg; 15 st)

Career
- Sport: Golf
- Turned professional: 1986
- Former tours: European Tour; Challenge Tour
- Professional wins: 4

Number of wins by tour
- Challenge Tour: 4

Simon David Hurley (born 7 December 1963) is an English professional golfer.

== Career ==
Hurley was born in Bristol, and turned professional in 1986. After ten years of playing on the second tier European Challenge Tour and visiting qualifying school, he finally gained his European Tour card for 1996 when he finished 5th on the end of season Challenge Tour Rankings in 1995.

At the 1996 Catalan Open, his first event on the European Tour, Hurley hit a rock and damaged his arm, which required surgery. He was granted a medical exemption in 1997, but lost his card at the end of that season. He made it back to the tour in 1999 via qualifying school, but was again unable to retain his playing status.

Hurley has four times on the Challenge Tour, the first coming in 1989 at the Citta di Firenze. He also won the 1992 East Sussex National Challenge where he overcame Retief Goosen in a playoff. His fourth win came in the 1995 Memorial Olivier Barras.

== Professional wins (4) ==
=== Challenge Tour wins (4) ===
No.	Date	Tournament	Winning score	Margin of victory	Runner(s)-up
1	9 Oct 1989	Citta di Firenze	−11 (68-67-70-72=277)	1 stroke	(England) Neal Briggs, (Italy) Gerolamo Delfino, (Wales) Keith Jones
2	23 Mar 1990	Open Ercros 1	−6 (73-70-70=213)	2 strokes	(Spain) Antonio Garrido
3	21 Aug 1992	East Sussex National Challenge	−3 (70-70-72-73=285)	Playoff	(South Africa) Retief Goosen
4	25 Jun 1995	Memorial Olivier Barras	+1 (72-71-71=214)	1 stroke	(Switzerland) Stefan Gort

Challenge Tour playoff record (1–0)

No.	Year	Tournament	Opponent	Result
1	1992	East Sussex National Challenge	(South Africa) Retief Goosen	Won with birdie on first extra hole

== See also ==
- List of golfers with most Challenge Tour wins
