= Challenge Tour =

Professional golf tour in Europe

- Current season, competition or edition: 2026 Challenge Tour
- Sport: Golf
- Founded: 1986
- Founder: PGA European Tour
- First season: 1989
- Director: Alain de Soultrait
- Countries: Based in Europe (Note: Schedules have also included events in Asia, Africa, South America and North America.)
- Most titles: Tournament wins: (England) Iain Pyman (8)
- Related competitions: European Tour
- Website: http://www.europeantour.com/challenge-tour/

The Challenge Tour, currently titled as the HotelPlanner Tour for sponsorship reasons and also sometimes referred to as the European Challenge Tour, is the second-tier men's professional golf tour in Europe. It is operated by the PGA European Tour and similarly with the main European Tour and the European Senior Tour, some of the events are played outside Europe.

== History ==
The tour was introduced in 1986, when the national tours of Sweden, France and Italy became open to foreign players, and was initially called the Satellite Tour. The Order of Merit was introduced in 1989, with the top five players on it winning membership of the European Tour for the following season. The following year the tour was renamed the Challenge Tour, a name already used in 1989. Up to 1993 the Challenge Tour rankings were based on each player's best several results, but since 1994 it has been a straightforward money list, with all results counting.

Players who are successful on the Challenge Tour qualify for membership of the European Tour the following year. Fifteen players earn direct promotion to the European Tour. Players finishing 16–45 may also gain qualification for occasional low-prize-money European Tour events, but can improve their status through European Tour Qualifying School. Players who win three Challenge Tour events in a season are fast-tracked onto the main tour immediately and are fully exempt the following season, similar to that of the US-based Korn Ferry Tour.

In January 2025, it was announced that the tour had signed a title sponsorship agreement with HotelPlanner, being renamed as the HotelPlanner Tour.

== World ranking points ==
Official World Golf Ranking points are awarded for high finishes in Challenge Tour events. Formerly, most events awarded 12 points to the winner, with European Tour dual-ranking events awarding 18 points. The Challenge Tour Grand Final gave 17 points to the winner.

In 2014, a number of events received slightly higher points totals, with three events earning a minimum of 13 points and the Challenge Tour Grand Final winner receiving 17 points, up from 16.

== Satellite tours ==
One competitive level down from the Challenge Tour are five third-level developmental tours, the Alps Tour, the Pro Golf Tour, Tartan Pro Tour, Clutch Pro Tour, and the Nordic Golf League. The top players not otherwise exempt (five each from the Alps, Pro Golf, and Nordic Golf League, three from the Clutch Tour, two from the Tartan Pro Tour) from the Order of Merit of each of these tours earn status on the Challenge Tour for the following season. The Challenge Tour also offers status to players competing in the European Tour Qualifying School, giving privileges to those who make the 72-hole cut at the final stage but fail to place in the top 20.

In December 2022, it was announced that the Clutch Pro Tour and the Tartan Pro Tour would become official feeder tours to the Challenge Tour; in place of the now defunct PGA EuroPro Tour, which ceased in 2022. The Tartan Pro Tour would offer Challenge Tour status to the leading player on the Order of Merit, whereas the Clutch Pro Tour would offer Challenge Tour status to the top two players on the Order of Merit..

In 2024, with inclusion into the OWGR, the Clutch Pro Tour increased the number of Challenge Tour cards to three, with the Tartan Pro Tour increasing the number of cards to two. In 2024, the China Tour offered a Challenge Tour card to the player second in the rankings. For 2026, the revived MENA Golf Tour gave a Challenge Tour card to the Order of Merit winner.

Players can also earn immediate access to the Challenge Tour for a three-win season on the Clutch Pro Tour, Tartan Pro Tour, Alps Tour, Pro Golf Tour and Nordic Golf League.

== Schedules ==
Originally, the Challenge Tour events were held in Western Europe. In 1991, the five Safari Circuit events in Africa were added. Only the Kenya Open (until 2018) remained a regular event on the tour for more than a few years, although the Zambia Open returned to the tour between 2001 and 2004 as the first Sunshine Tour co-sanctioned event. In 2020, the tour re-entered into South Africa, again co-sanctioning events with the Sunshine Tour. Another African tournament, the Moroccan Golf Classic, was held from 2002 to 2010. The Challenge Tour featured tournaments co-sanctioned with the Tour de las Américas in Latin America from 2003 to 2011.

In 2011, the tour added its first events in Asia, the Gujarat Kensville Challenge in India and the Kazakhstan Open. In 2023, the tour re-expanded their schedule into India, playing two events co-sanctioned alongside the Professional Golf Tour of India. This came after the European Tour had entered into a partnership with the PGTI.

== Rankings winners ==
| Year | Winner | Points |
|---|---|---|
| 2026 | (Denmark) Hamish Brown | 1,702 |
| 2025 | (South Africa) J. C. Ritchie | 1,674 |
| 2024 | (Denmark) Rasmus Neergaard-Petersen | 1,826 |
| 2023 | (England) Marco Penge | 1,285 |
| 2022 | (England) Nathan Kimsey | 208,918 |
| 2021 | (Denmark) Marcus Helligkilde | 222,628 |
| 2020 | (Czech Republic) Ondřej Lieser | 116,345 |
| 2019 | (Italy) Francesco Laporta | 210,132 |
| 2018 | (Denmark) Joachim B. Hansen | 222,320 |
| 2017 | (Finland) Tapio Pulkkanen | 210,799 |
| 2016 | (England) Jordan Smith | 239,985 |
| Year | Winner | Prize money (€) |
| 2015 | (Portugal) Ricardo Gouveia | 251,952 |
| 2014 | (England) Andrew Johnston | 190,856 |
| 2013 | (Italy) Andrea Pavan | 147,811 |
| 2012 | (Norway) Espen Kofstad | 131,099 |
| 2011 | (England) Tommy Fleetwood | 148,913 |
| 2010 | (Spain) Álvaro Velasco | 134,297 |
| 2009 | (Italy) Edoardo Molinari | 242,980 |
| 2008 | (England) David Horsey | 144,118 |
| 2007 | (France) Mike Lorenzo-Vera | 128,927 |
| 2006 | (Wales) Mark Pilkington | 119,152 |
| 2005 | (Scotland) Marc Warren | 103,577 |
| 2004 | (England) Lee Slattery | 95,980 |
| 2003 | (Sweden) Johan Edfors | 94,509 |
| 2002 | (England) Lee S. James | 121,531 |
| 2001 | (England) Mark Foster | 97,737 |
| 2000 | (Sweden) Henrik Stenson | 108,710 |
| 1999 | (Spain) Carl Suneson | 69,641 |
| Year | Winner | Prize money (£) |
| 1998 | (England) Warren Bennett | 81,053 |
| 1997 | (Italy) Michele Reale | 51,679 |
| 1996 | (England) Ian Garbutt | 37,661 |
| 1995 | (Denmark) Thomas Bjørn | 46,471 |
| 1994 | (Northern Ireland) Raymond Burns | 43,583 |
| 1993 | (Sweden) Klas Eriksson | 48,365 |
| 1992 | (Wales) Paul Affleck | 39,768 |
| 1991 | (England) David R. Jones | 35,533 |
| 1990 | (Italy) Giuseppe Calì | 28,383 |
| Year | Winner | Points |
| 1989 | (England) Neal Briggs | 9,464 |

== See also ==
- List of golfers with most Challenge Tour wins
- List of golfers to achieve a three-win promotion from the Challenge Tour
