= Danish Open (golf) =

Danish Golf Open
Tournament information
- Location: Nimtofte, Denmark
- Established: 1991
- Course: Lübker Golf Resort
- Par: 72
- Length: 6,476 yards (5,922 m)
- Tours: Challenge Tour; Nordic Golf League
- Format: Stroke play
- Prize fund: €40,000
- Month played: June

Tournament record score
- Aggregate: 270 Liam White (1994)
- To par: −18 as above

Current champion
- (Norway) Philip Linberg Bondestad

Final champion
- Location in Denmark

The Danish Open was the national open golf tournament of Denmark. In 1991, from 1993–1997 and from 2000–2004 it was an event on the Challenge Tour.

== Winners ==
Year	Tour (Note: CHA − Challenge Tour; NGL − Nordic Golf League.)	Winner	Score	To par	Margin of victory	Runner(s)-up	Venue	Ref.
Danish Golf Open
2024	NGL	(Norway) Philip Linberg Bondestad (a)	206	−10	1 stroke	(Denmark) Frederik Birkelund	Lübker	
2005–2023: No tournament
Nykredit Danish Open
2004	CHA	(England) Matthew Morris	275	−9	3 strokes	(England) Simon Dyson	Esbjerg	
2003	CHA	(Australia) Marcus Fraser	276	−12	3 strokes	(France) Grégory Bourdy (Sweden) Joakim Rask	Gilleleje	
2002	CHA	(Australia) Ed Stedman	285	−3	2 strokes	(England) Lee S. James	Horsens	
2001	CHA	(France) Sébastien Delagrange	282	−2	2 strokes	(Sweden) Peter Malmgren	Aalborg	
Danish Open
2000	CHA	(Sweden) Fredrik Henge	278	−10	2 strokes	(Sweden) Joakim Rask	Odense Eventyr	
Scandic Hotel Danish Open
1999	NGL	(Denmark) Anders Schmidt Hansen (a)	211	−5	1 stroke	(Denmark) Søren Hansen	Odense	
Team Erhverv Danish Open
1998: No tournament
1997	CHA	(England) David Lynn	274	−14	3 strokes	(Netherlands) Robert-Jan Derksen	Simons	
1996	CHA	(Sweden) Robert Jonsson	276	−12	Playoff	(Sweden) Mårten Olander	Simons	
1995	CHA	(England) Rob Edwards	281	−7	2 strokes	(Denmark) Anders Hansen (France) Nicolas Joakimides (England) Gary Marks (Spain) Iñigo Moral (Sweden) Magnus Persson	Simons	
1994	CHA	(England) Liam White	270	−18	1 stroke	(England) Jon Robson	Simons	
1993	CHA	(Denmark) Christian Post	277	−11	2 strokes	(Denmark) Anders Sørensen	Rungsted	
Formula Micro Danish Open
1992: No tournament
1991	CHA	(Sweden) Peter Hedblom	276	−8	3 strokes	(Sweden) Per Nyman	Helsingør	

== See also ==
- Open golf tournament
- Danish PGA Championship
