= Günther Hamburg Classics =

Golf Challenge
Tournament information
- Location: Brunstorf, Germany
- Established: 2000
- Courses: Brunstorf Golf and Country Club
- Par: 72
- Length: 7,456 yards (6,818 m)
- Tour: Challenge Tour
- Format: Stroke play
- Prize fund: €100,000
- Month played: July
- Final year: 2002

Tournament record score
- Aggregate: 263 Michael Jonzon (2003)
- To par: −25 as above

Final champion
- (England) Iain Pyman
- Location in Germany Location in Schleswig-Holstein

The Günther Hamburg Classics was a golf tournament on the Challenge Tour between 2000 and 2002. It was played annually near Hamburg, Germany.

== Winners ==
Year	Winner	Score	To par	Margin of victory	Runner-up	Venue
Golf Challenge
2002	(England) Iain Pyman	204 (Note: Shortened to 54 holes due to rain.)	−12	3 strokes	(Northern Ireland) Graeme McDowell	Brunstorf
Günther Hamburg Classic
2001	(Sweden) Peter Hanson	265	−23	3 strokes	(Netherlands) Robert-Jan Derksen	Treudelberg
2000	(Republic of Ireland) David Higgins	270	−18	Playoff	(Spain) Carlos Rodiles	Wendlohe
