= Danish Open =

Danish Open may refer to:

- Denmark Open a badminton tournament
- Danish Open (golf) a defunct golf tournament
- Danish Open (tennis) a WTA tennis tournament for women
