= Delagrange =

Delagrange is a surname. Notable people with the surname include:

- Léon Delagrange (1872–1910), French sculptor
- Sébastien Delagrange (born 1974), French golfer
