= Russian Open =

Coordinates: 55.694°N 37.377°E

M2M Russian Open
Tournament information
- Location: Moscow, Russia
- Established: 1993
- Course: Skolkovo Golf Club
- Par: 71
- Length: 7,025 yards (6,424 m)
- Tours: European Tour; Challenge Tour
- Format: Stroke play
- Prize fund: €1,000,000
- Month played: September
- Final year: 2015

Tournament record score
- Aggregate: 265 Per-Ulrik Johansson (2007)
- To par: −23 as above

Final champion
- (England) Lee Slattery
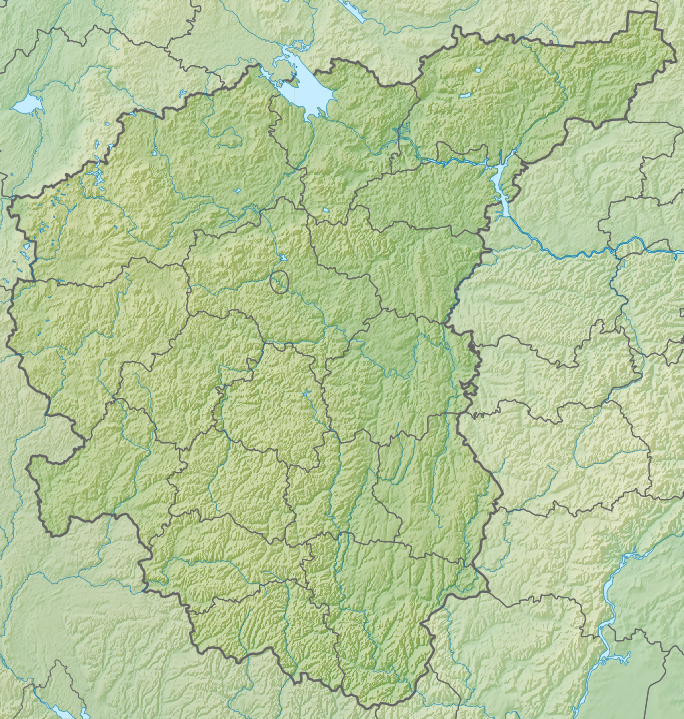
- Location in Russia Location in Central Federal District

The Russian Open was a golf tournament on the European Tour. The event was established in 1993, and was first held at the Moscow Country Club in Nakhabino, just outside Krasnogorsk, Moscow Oblast, Russia.

== History ==
Originally contested over the first nine holes at the Moscow Country Club as an amateur tournament while the rest of the course was still under construction, the Russian Open became Russia's first professional golf tournament in 1994. It became an event on the second-tier Challenge Tour in 1996, and was added to the European Tour schedule from 2003. Between 2003 and 2005, it was an official money event on both tours, and from 2006 to 2008, it was solely an event on the European Tour calendar.

The 2005 prize fund of $500,000 was around a tenth of those of the leading events on the European Tour, even leaving aside the major championships and World Golf Championships. However, it was one of the richest tournaments of the season on the Challenge Tour. In 2006, when it became a European Tour only event, the prize fund doubled to $1 million, doubling again the following year, to $2 million.

The tournament was not played from 2009 to 2012 but returned in 2013 at the Tseleevo Golf & Polo Club. Tseleevo had hosted a Challenge Tour event, the M2M Russian Challenge Cup, from 2010 to 2012. The Russian Open moved to the Skolkovo Golf Club in 2015 where Andrey Pavlov made history when he became the first Russian to make the cut in a European Tour event. He finished 71st, last of those who made the cut.

== Winners ==
Year	Tour(s) (Note: CHA − Challenge Tour; EUR − European Tour.)	Winner	Score	To par	Margin of victory	Runner(s)-up	Winner's share (€)
M2M Russian Open
2015	EUR	(England) Lee Slattery	269	−15	1 stroke	(Argentina) Estanislao Goya	166,660
2014	EUR	(England) David Horsey	275	−13	Playoff	(Republic of Ireland) Damien McGrane	166,660
2013	EUR	(Northern Ireland) Michael Hoey	272	−16	4 strokes	(France) Alexandre Kaleka (England) Matthew Nixon	166,660
Inteco Russian Open Golf Championship
2009–2012: No tournament
2008	EUR	(Sweden) Mikael Lundberg (2)	267	−21	2 strokes	(Spain) José Manuel Lara	210,237
Russian Open Golf Championship
2007	EUR	(Sweden) Per-Ulrik Johansson	265	−23	6 strokes	(Netherlands) Robert-Jan Derksen	244,251
Imperial Collection Russian Open
2006	EUR	(Spain) Alejandro Cañizares	266	−22	4 strokes	(Scotland) David Drysdale	130,642
Cadillac Russian Open
2005	CHA, EUR	(Sweden) Mikael Lundberg	273	−15	Playoff	(England) Andrew Butterfield	67,600
BMW Russian Open
2004	CHA, EUR	(England) Gary Emerson	272	−16	2 strokes	(Austria) Markus Brier	67,903
2003	CHA, EUR	(Australia) Marcus Fraser	269	−19	Playoff	(Austria) Martin Wiegele	66,660
2002	CHA	(England) Iain Pyman (2)	269	−19	1 stroke	(England) Benn Barham (Netherlands) Guido van der Valk	30,000
2001	CHA	(Wales) Jamie Donaldson	270	−18	3 strokes	(England) Michael Archer (Finland) Mikael Piltz	27,147
2000	CHA	(Italy) Marco Bernardini	269	−19	3 strokes	(Germany) Erol Şimşek	26,396
1999	CHA	(England) Iain Pyman	273	−15	1 stroke	(South Africa) Hennie Otto	20,467
Moscow Country Club Russian Open
1998	CHA	(England) Warren Bennett	270	−18	7 strokes	(Sweden) Max Anglert (Argentina) Ricardo González	20,467
Sovereign Russian Open
1997	CHA	(Italy) Michele Reale	280	−8	Playoff	(Germany) Heinz-Peter Thül	20,467
Russian Open
1996	CHA	(England) Carl Watts	203	−13	2 strokes	(England) John Mellor	14,624
General Motors Russian Open
1995		(England) Simon Clough	294	+6			
Phillips Russian Open
1994		(United States) Steve Schroeder					
Russian Open
1993		(Russia) Konstantin Lifanov					

== See also ==
- Open golf tournament
