= PGA of Austria Masters =

Tournament information
- Location: Kitzbühel, Austria
- Established: 2001
- Course: Golf Eichenheim
- Par: 71
- Length: 6,598 yards (6,033 m)
- Tour: Challenge Tour
- Format: Stroke play
- Prize fund: €135,000
- Month played: September
- Final year: 2001

Tournament record score
- Aggregate: 268 Iain Pyman (2001)
- To par: −16 as above

Final champion
- (England) Iain Pyman
- Location in Austria

The PGA of Austria Masters was a one-off golf tournament on the Challenge Tour played in September 2001 at Golf Eichenheim in Kitzbühel, Austria.

== Winners ==
Year	Winner	Score	To par	Margin of victory	Runner-up
2001	(England) Iain Pyman	268	−16	1 stroke	(Sweden) Daniel Chopra
