= Chris Gane =

English golfer (born 1974)

Personal information
- Full name: Christopher Gane
- Nationality: England
- Born: 5 June 1974 (age 52) London, England
- Height: 6 ft 1 in (1.85 m)
- Weight: 175 lb (79 kg; 12.5 st)
- Children: 2

Career
- Sport: Golf
- Turned professional: 1993
- Former tours: European Tour; Challenge Tour; PGA EuroPro Tour
- Professional wins: 4

Number of wins by tour
- Challenge Tour: 2
- Other: 2

Christopher Gane (born 5 June 1974) is an English professional golfer from Bromley and the current head professional at West Kent Golf Club.

He formally played on the European Tour and Challenge Tour. He recorded a 17 during a 2003 event at Gleneagles.

== Career ==
Gane has mainly competed on the second tier Challenge Tour and has two wins on that tour, both in 2001. In 2009 he finished 13th in the Challenge Tour rankings to guarantee himself full European Tour status for 2010. He is one of the few left-handed players on tour.

== Professional wins (4) ==
=== Challenge Tour wins (2) ===
No.	Date	Tournament	Winning score	Margin of victory	Runner(s)-up
1	20 May 2001	Austrian Open	−18 (73-65-64-68=270)	1 stroke	(England) Andrew Marshall
2	21 Oct 2001	Terme Euganee International Open Padova	−23 (70-64-65-66=265)	1 stroke	(England) Philip Golding, (Sweden) Mattias Nilsson

=== PGA EuroPro Tour wins (2) ===
No.	Date	Tournament	Winning score	Margin of victory	Runner(s)-up
1	5 May 2016	World Snooker Golf Masters	−8 (69-67-69=205)	Playoff	(Northern Ireland) Jonathan Caldwell
2	14 Jun 2018	Eagle Orchid Scottish Masters	−10 (66-66=132)	2 strokes	(England) Joe Brooks, (England) Gary King, (England) James Ruth, (England) Jack Yule

== See also ==
- 2009 Challenge Tour graduates
- 2011 Challenge Tour graduates
