= Iain Pyman =

English golfer

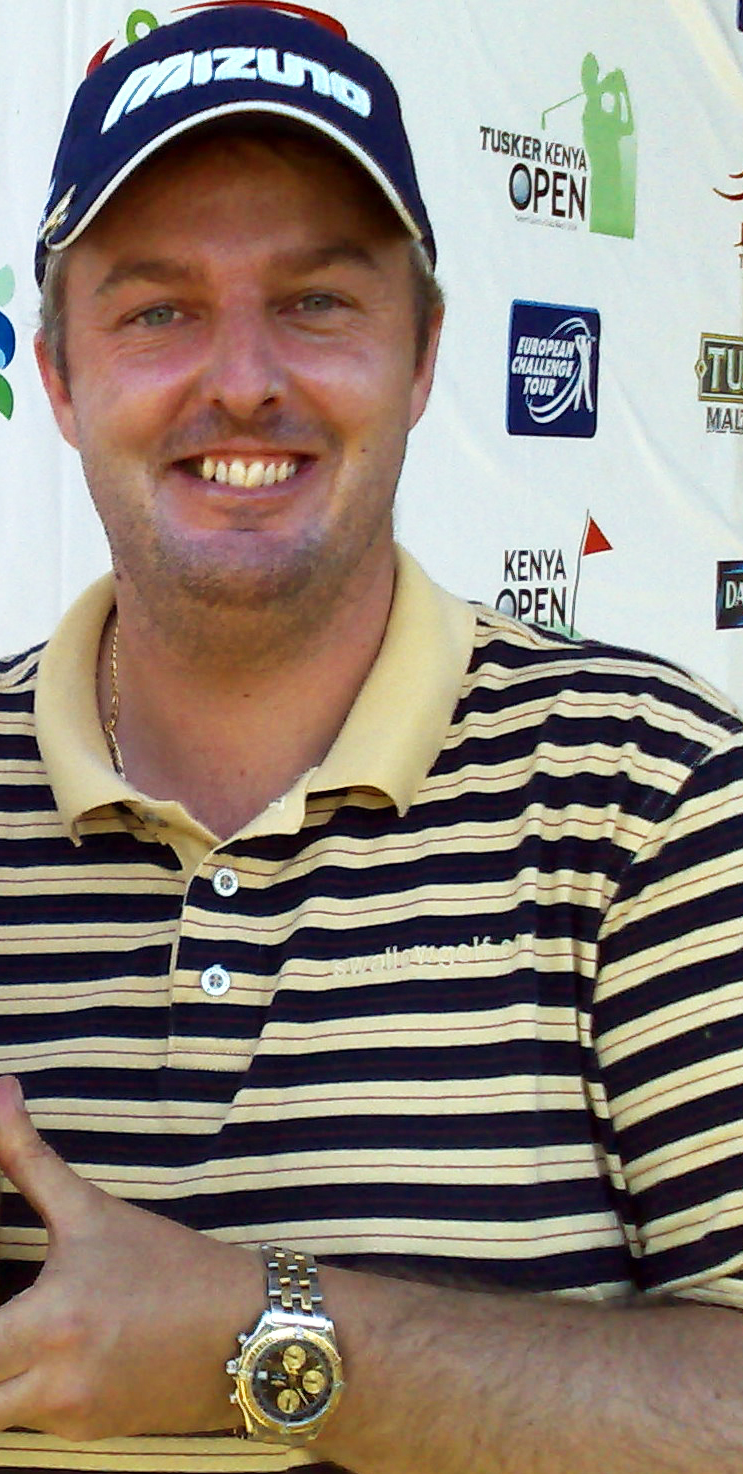

Personal information
- Nationality: England
- Born: 3 March 1973 (age 53) Whitby, England
- Height: 6 ft 0 in (1.83 m)
- Weight: 196 lb (89 kg; 14.0 st)
- Spouse: Jane Pyman (m. 2018)
- Children: 3

Career
- Sport: Golf
- Turned professional: 1994
- Former tours: European Tour; Challenge Tour
- Professional wins: 8

Number of wins by tour
- Challenge Tour: 8 (1st all-time)

Best results in major championships
- Masters Tournament: CUT: 1994
- PGA Championship: DNP
- U.S. Open: DNP
- The Open Championship: T27: 1993

Iain Pyman (born 3 March 1973) is an English professional golfer.

== Early life and amateur career ==
Pyman was born in Whitby. He won the Carris Trophy in 1991, and played in a winning Jacques Léglise Trophy team the same year. In 1993 he won The Amateur Championship by defeating Paul Page after 37 holes at Royal Portrush, and was the leading amateur in The Open Championship at Royal St George's. He played in the Walker Cup at the end of 1993.

== Professional career ==
In 1994, Pyman turned professional. His career has fluctuated between seasons on the main European Tour and seasons on the second tier Challenge Tour. He has won eight tournaments on the Challenge Tour, more than any other player, but has not won on the European Tour. He won the ECCO Tour Championship and the Telia Challenge Waxholm in back-to-back weeks on the Challenge Tour in 2007. He also won the Tusker Kenya Open in 2008.

== Amateur wins ==
- 1991 Carris Trophy
- 1993 The Amateur Championship

== Professional wins (8) ==
=== Challenge Tour wins (8) ===
No.	Date	Tournament	Winning score	Margin of victory	Runner(s)-up
1	22 Aug 1999	BMW Russian Open	−15 (64-70-68-71=273)	1 stroke	(South Africa) Hennie Otto
2	17 Oct 1999	Challenge de France Bayer	−13 (76-67-65-67=275)	Playoff	(Argentina) Gustavo Rojas
3	30 Sep 2001	PGA of Austria Masters	−16 (69-65-61-73=270)	1 stroke	(Sweden) Daniel Chopra
4	21 Jul 2002	Golf Challenge	−12 (66-66-72=204) (Note: Shortened to 54 holes due to weather.)	3 strokes	(Northern Ireland) Graeme McDowell
5	11 Aug 2002	BMW Russian Open (2)	−19 (62-67-71-69=269)	1 stroke	(England) Benn Barham, (Netherlands) Guido van der Valk
6	2 Sep 2007	ECCO Tour Championship^{1}	−20 (64-67-62-67=260)	3 strokes	(Sweden) Magnus A. Carlsson, (England) John E. Morgan
7	9 Sep 2007	Telia Challenge Waxholm	−18 (68-70-70-66=274)	2 strokes	(England) Robert Coles
8	9 Mar 2008	Tusker Kenya Open	−12 (71-63-70-68=272)	3 strokes	(Austria) Thomas Feyrsinger

^{1}Co-sanctioned by the Nordic Golf League

Challenge Tour playoff record (1–1)

No.	Year	Tournament	Opponent	Result
1	1999	Challenge de France Bayer	(Argentina) Gustavo Rojas	Won with birdie on sixth extra hole
2	2005	Firstplus Wales Challenge	(France) Olivier David	Lost to birdie on second extra hole

== Results in major championships ==
Tournament	1993	1994	1995	1996	1997	1998	1999	2000	2001	2002	2003
Masters Tournament		CUT									
The Open Championship	T27LA										CUT

Note: Pyman never played in the U.S. Open or the PGA Championship.

Did not play

LA = Low amateur
CUT = missed the half-way cut
"T" = tied

== Team appearances ==
Amateur

- Jacques Léglise Trophy (representing Great Britain & Ireland): 1991 (winners)
- Walker Cup (representing Great Britain & Ireland): 1993
- European Amateur Team Championship (representing England): 1993

== See also ==
- 2005 European Tour Qualifying School graduates
- 2007 Challenge Tour graduates
- List of golfers with most Challenge Tour wins
