= Wolfgang Huget =

German professional golfer

Personal information
- Nationality: Germany
- Born: 4 April 1977 (age 49) Mönchengladbach, Germany

Career
- Sport: Golf
- Turned professional: 1998
- Former tours: European Tour; Challenge Tour
- Professional wins: 6

Number of wins by tour
- Challenge Tour: 2
- Other: 4

Wolfgang Huget (born 4 April 1977) is a German professional golfer. He has won twice on the Challenge Tour.

== Amateur career ==
Huget was born in Mönchengladbach and started playing golf at Golf- und Landclub Schmitzhof when he was 12. He was part of the German National Team and competed internationally. He won bronze at the 1996 European Youths' Team Championship in Portugal, where the German team lost to Spain in the semi-final but beat a Swedish team with Henrik Stenson in the bronze match 4–3, thanks to Huget winning his singles match against Johan Girdo.

== Professional career ==
Huget turned professional in 1998. He played on the Challenge Tour between 2001 and 2006 where he won the 2001 Galeria Kaufhof Pokal Challenge in Germany and the 2002 PGA Triveneta Terme Euganee International Open in Italy. On his way to victory at Golf Club della Montecchia, he shot a career best 9-under-par 63 in the third round.

At the 2001 BMW International Open in Munich, he was, alongside Alex Čejka, the second best German behind Bernhard Langer after a 69 in the first round, but did not make the cut.

In 2005, Huget made five starts on the European Tour but made no cuts. After retiring from tour, he became a teaching pro at Osnabrücker Golf Club.

In 2016, at the Niedersachsen-Bremen State Club Team Championship held at Golf Park Steinhuder Meer, Huget made a hole-in-one at the third playoff hole, a 305-meter par-4 hole.

== Professional wins (6) ==
=== Challenge Tour wins (2) ===
No.	Date	Tournament	Winning score	Margin of victory	Runner-up
1	17 Jun 2001	Galeria Kaufhof Pokal Challenge	−22 (70-64-69-67=270)	3 strokes	(Germany) Tino Schuster
2	7 Jul 2002	PGA Triveneta Terme Euganee International Open	−20 (69-70-63-66=268)	2 strokes	(France) François Delamontagne

=== EPD Tour wins (1) ===
No.	Date	Tournament	Winning score	Margin of victory	Runner-up
1	8 Jun 2005	Baloise Esprit Pro Tour	E (72-76-68=216)	1 stroke	(Netherlands) John Bleys

=== Other wins (3) ===
- 2001 German PGA Championship, Arcor Promec Sinitec Open, German National Open (PGA of Germany)

== Team appearances ==
Amateur

- European Youths' Team Championship (representing Germany): 1996
