= Nicolas Meitinger =

German professional golfer

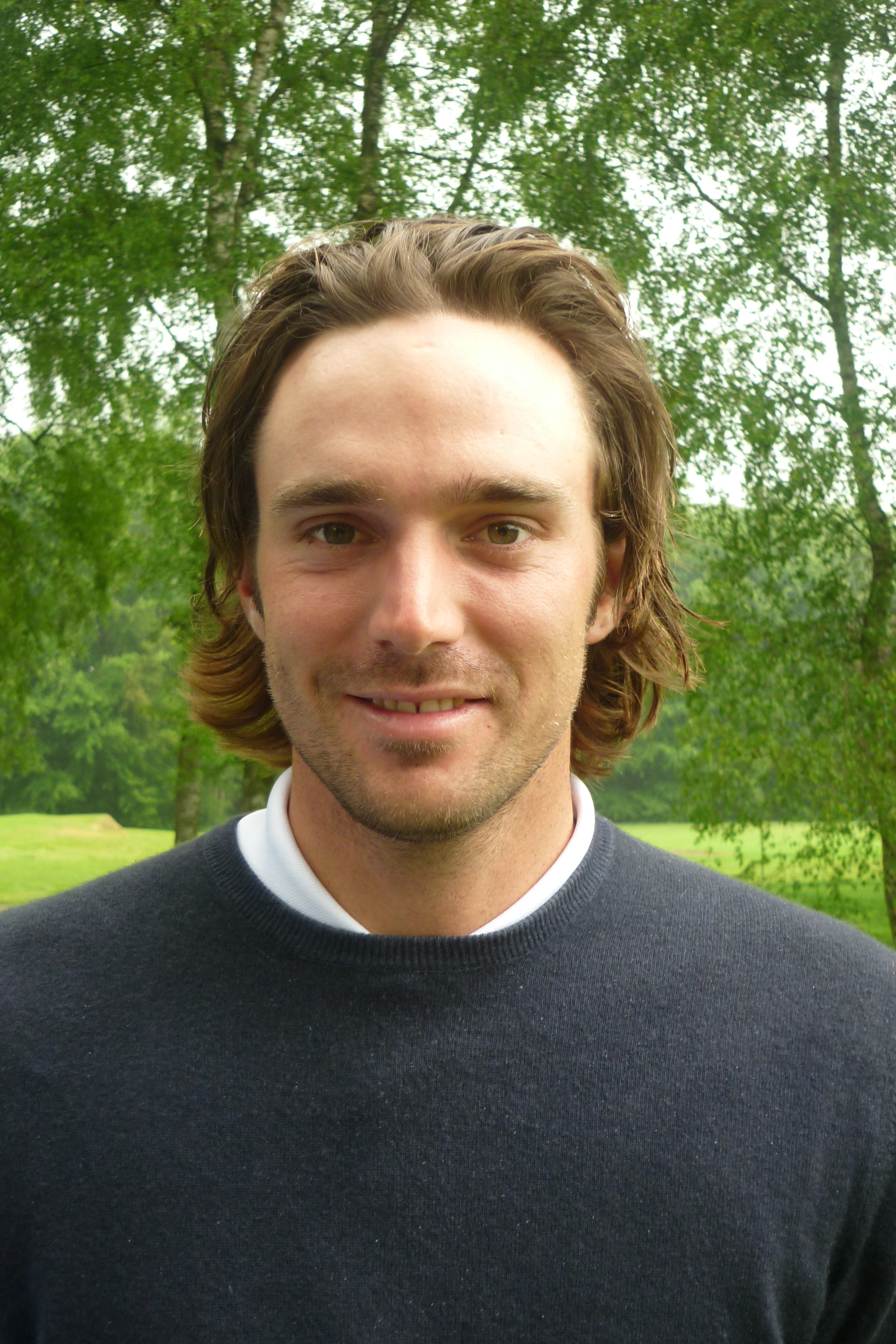

Personal information
- Nationality: Germany
- Born: 10 February 1984 (age 42) Cologne, Germany
- Height: 1.80 m (5 ft 11 in)

Career
- Sport: Golf
- Turned professional: 2005
- Current tour: Challenge Tour
- Former tour: Pro Golf Tour
- Professional wins: 12

Number of wins by tour
- Challenge Tour: 1
- Other: 11

Achievements and awards
- EPD Tour Order of Merit winner: 2005

Nicolas Meitinger (born 10 February 1984) is a German professional golfer.

== Career ==
Meitinger was born in Cologne, Germany. He turned professional in 2005 and initially played on the EPD Tour, where he had six wins. After finishing third on the EPD Tour Order of Merit in 2008, and subsequently reaching the final stage of the European Tour's Qualifying School, he earned a place on the second-tier Challenge Tour for the first time. In his first season on the tour he recorded two top-10 finishes and ended 70th on the money list, a position he improved on by a single place in 2010. In 2011 he won for the first time on the Challenge Tour. He had further wins on the Pro Golf Tour in 2014 and 2015.

== Professional wins (12) ==
=== Challenge Tour wins (1) ===
No.	Date	Tournament	Winning score	Margin of victory	Runner-up
1	8 May 2011	Allianz Challenge de France	−15 (71-63-67-68=269)	Playoff	(Germany) Maximilian Kieffer

Challenge Tour playoff record (1–0)

No.	Year	Tournament	Opponent	Result
1	2011	Allianz Challenge de France	(Germany) Maximilian Kieffer	Won with birdie on second extra hole

=== Pro Golf Tour wins (10) ===
No.	Date	Tournament	Winning score	Margin of victory	Runner(s)-up
1	11 May 2005	Gleidingen Classic	−6 (71-71-68=210)	5 strokes	(Finland) Janne Mommo, (Germany) Christian Reimbold, (Germany) Mark Steckmann
2	5 Jul 2005	Central European Open	−12 (66-68-67=201)	4 strokes	(Germany) Richard Porter
3	27 Jul 2005	Höslwang Classic	−8 (72-68-68=208)	1 stroke	(Germany) John Bleys, (France) Anthony Grenier
4	10 Aug 2005	Sybrook Classic	−7 (74-69-66=209)	3 strokes	(Germany) Manuel Kempe, (Germany) Jochen Lupprian
5	10 Jul 2008	OTP Private Bank Central European Golf Classic	−17 (67-64-68=199)	6 strokes	(Germany) Daniel Froreich
6	16 Jul 2008	Bohemia Franzensbad Classic	−12 (72-67-68=207)	2 strokes	(England) James Ruth
7	6 Feb 2010	Montgomerie Classic	−5 (70-69-72=211)	8 strokes	(Belgium) Thomas de Kesel, (Germany) Bernd Ritthammer
8	11 Feb 2010	Lykia Links Classic	−9 (74-69-64=207)	4 strokes	(Germany) Maximilian Glauert, (Republic of Ireland) Stephen Grant, (Germany) Bernd Ritthammer
9	26 Jan 2014	Sueno Pines Classic	−6 (70-68=138) (Note: Shortened to 36 holes due to weather.)	4 strokes	(Germany) Anton Kirstein
10	15 Apr 2015	Open Casa Green Golf	−9 (66-75-66=207)	1 stroke	(France) David Antonelli, (Germany) Julian Kunzenbacher, (England) Ben Parker, (Scotland) Chris Robb

=== Other wins (1) ===
- 2008 German PGA Championship
