= Carlos Rodiles =

Spanish golfer (born 1975)

Personal information
- Full name: Carlos Jose Rodiles
- Nationality: Spain
- Born: 3 May 1975 (age 51) Málaga, Spain
- Height: 1.74 m (5 ft 9 in)
- Spouse: Carmen (m. 2001)
- Children: 2

Career
- Sport: Golf
- College: University of Florida
- Turned professional: 1997
- Former tours: European Tour; Challenge Tour
- Highest ranking: 96 (16 November 2003)

Best results in major championships
- Masters Tournament: DNP
- PGA Championship: DNP
- U.S. Open: DNP
- The Open Championship: CUT: 2006

Carlos Jose Rodiles (born 3 May 1975) is a Spanish professional golfer who currently plays on the European Tour.

== Early life and amateur career ==
Rodiles was born in Málaga, Spain. He attended the University of Florida in Gainesville, Florida, United States, where he played for coach Buddy Alexander's Florida Gators men's golf team in National Collegiate Athletic Association (NCAA) competition in 1996 and 1997. As a Gators golfer, Rodiles was a member of the team that was the Southeastern Conference (SEC) runner-up and finished sixth in the NCAA tournament in 1996. He graduated from the University of Florida with a bachelor's degree in finance in 1998.

== Professional career ==
In 1997, Rodiles turning professional. He first qualified for the European Tour at the 1998 qualifying school. Rodiles finished 160th on the Order of Merit in his rookie season and dropped down to the second tier Challenge Tour for the following season. He regained his European Tour card by finishing third on the Challenge Tour Rankings in 2000 when he had three runner-up finishes.

Rodiles managed to maintain his playing status on the elite tour until the end of 2005 through his position on the Order of Merit. He relied on invitations in 2006, before regaining his card when he returned to, and was medalist at the European Tour Qualifying School final stage in 2006. However having dropped outside the top 120 on the money list again in 2008, and having failed to come though final qualifying, Rodiles was again playing on the Challenge Tour in 2009.

Rodiles' best year to date has been 2003, when he ended the season in 24th place on the European Tour Order of Merit after losing out in a playoff to Freddie Jacobson at the season ending Volvo Masters Andalucia.

== Personal life ==
Rodiles lives in Marbella, Spain.

== Amateur wins ==
- 1994 Tournament of the Americas

== Playoff record ==
European Tour playoff record (0–1)

No.	Year	Tournament	Opponent	Result
1	2003	Volvo Masters Andalucía	(Sweden) Freddie Jacobson	Lost to par on fourth extra hole

Challenge Tour playoff record (0–2)

No.	Year	Tournament	Opponent	Result
1	2000	Günther Hamburg Classic	(Republic of Ireland) David Higgins	Lost to birdie on first extra hole
2	2000	Le Touquet Challenge de France	(Sweden) Fredrik Andersson	Lost to par on second extra hole

== Results in major championships ==
Tournament	2006
The Open Championship	CUT

Note: Rodiles only played in The Open Championship.
CUT = missed the half-way cut

== See also ==
- 2006 European Tour Qualifying School graduates
- 2009 Challenge Tour graduates
- List of University of Florida alumni
