= Challenge de France (golf) =

Allianz Challenge de France
Tournament information
- Location: Paris, France
- Established: 1998
- Course: Golf Disneyland
- Par: 71
- Length: 6,956 yards (6,361 m)
- Tour: Challenge Tour
- Format: Stroke play
- Prize fund: €150,000
- Month played: May
- Final year: 2011

Tournament record score
- Aggregate: 268 Mårten Olander (2001)
- To par: −16 Warren Bennett (1998) −16 Mårten Olander (2001)

Final champion
- (Germany) Nicolas Meitinger
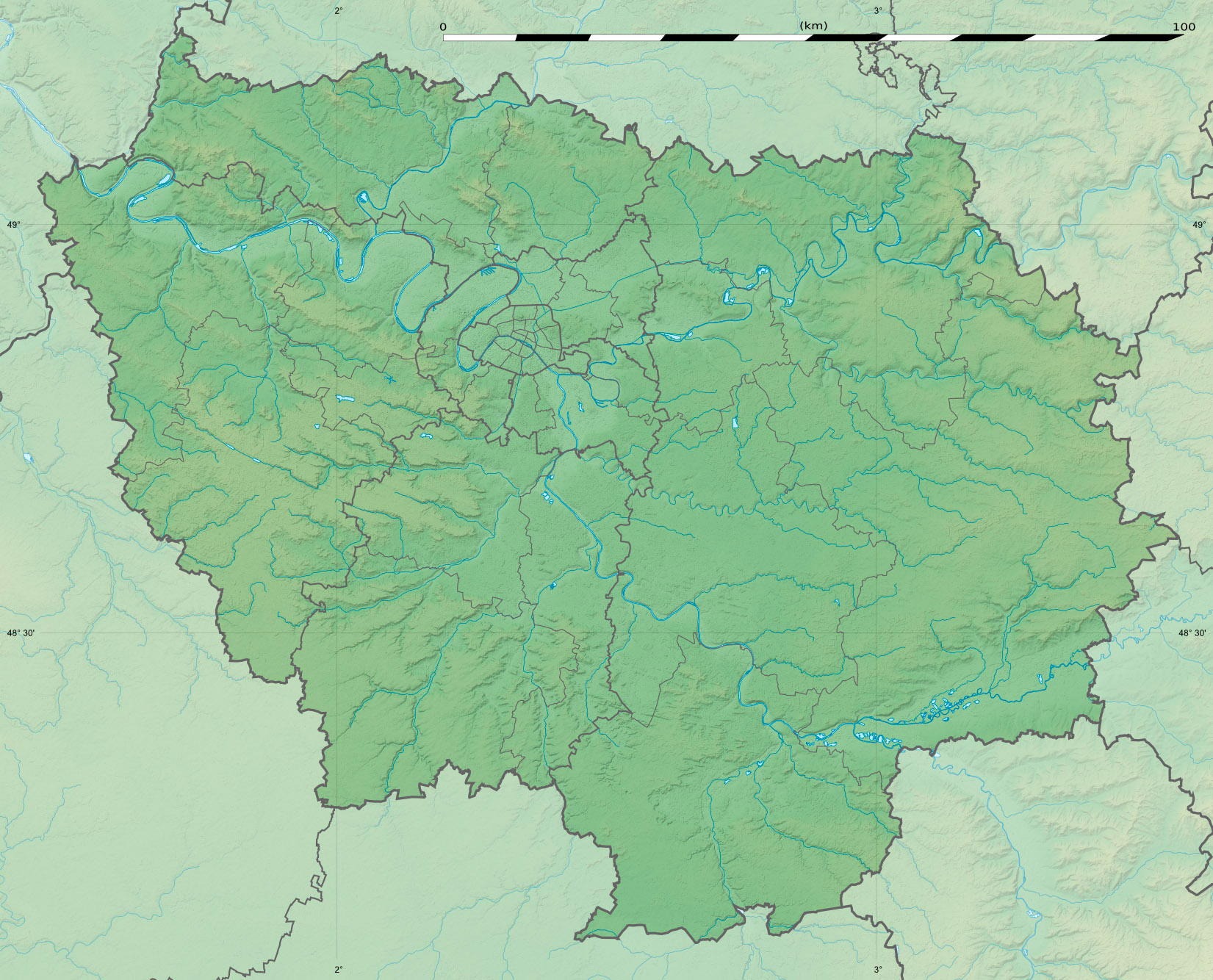
- Location in France Location in Île-de-France

The Challenge de France was a golf tournament on the Challenge Tour, played in France. It was held for the first time in May 1998 at Golf de Sablé-Solesmes in Sablé-sur-Sarthe, before moving to October for the following three seasons, during which it was played on a succession of French courses. The tournament was discontinued after 2001, although the name was used on some occasions for the AGF-Allianz Open des Volcans. In 2011, the tournament was revived as the Allianz Challenge de France, and was held at the Golf Disneyland course in Paris, which had also been the venue in 1999, and hosted the Tournoi Perrier de Paris in 1993. The 2011 edition was won by Germany's Nicolas Meitinger, securing his first Challenge Tour victory.

== Winners ==
Year	Winner	Score	To par	Margin of victory	Runner-up	Venue
Allianz Challenge de France
2011	(Germany) Nicolas Meitinger	269	−15	Playoff	(Germany) Maximilian Kieffer	Golf Disneyland
2002–2010: No tournament
Hardelot Challenge de France
2001	(Sweden) Mårten Olander	268	−16	1 stroke	(Scotland) Scott Drummond	Hardelot
Le Touquet Challenge de France
2000	(Sweden) Fredrik Andersson	277	−11	Playoff	(Spain) Carlos Rodiles	Golf du Touquet
Challenge de France Bayer
1999	(England) Iain Pyman	275	−13	Playoff	(Argentina) Gustavo Rojas	Golf Disneyland
Challenge de France
1998	(England) Warren Bennett	272	−16	Playoff	(England) Scott Watson	Sablé-Solesmes
