= Anders Schmidt Hansen =

Danish professional golfer (born 1978)

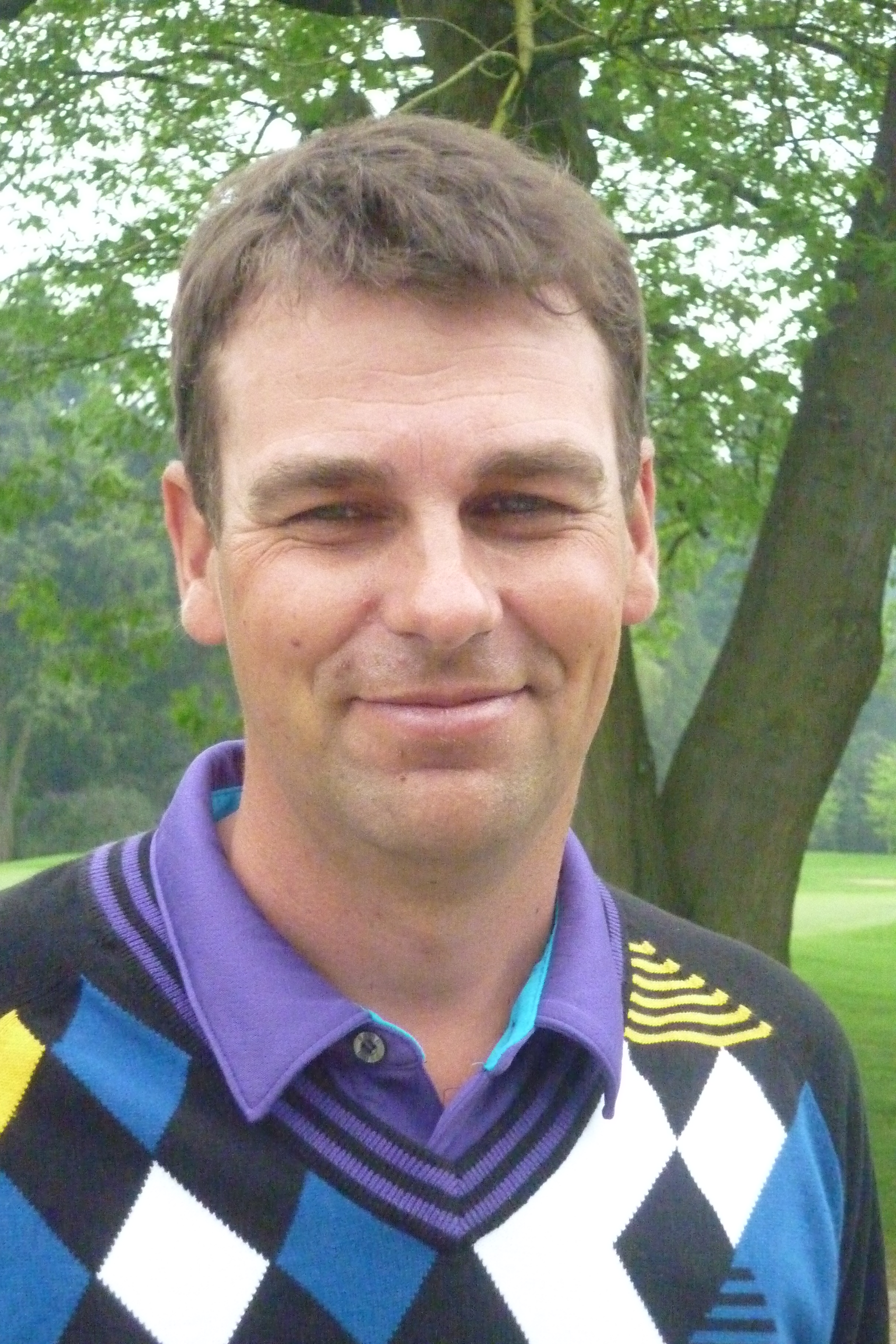

Personal information
- Nationality: Denmark
- Born: 31 January 1978 (age 48) Juelsminde, Denmark
- Height: 5 ft 10 in (1.78 m)
- Weight: 143 lb (65 kg; 10.2 st)

Career
- Sport: Golf
- Turned professional: 2003
- Former tour: Challenge Tour
- Professional wins: 3

Number of wins by tour
- Challenge Tour: 1
- Other: 2

Anders Schmidt Hansen (born 31 January 1978) is a Danish professional golfer.

== Career ==
Hansen won his national open in 1999 as an amateur, before turning professional in 2003 at the age of 25. At the end of that year he reached the final stage of the European Tour's Qualifying School, entitling him to play on the second-tier Challenge Tour in 2004. He played thirteen Challenge Tour events in 2004, but recorded only one top-10 finish and ended 108th on the money list. However, this still gained him entry to most Tour events in 2005, and he enjoyed a far more successful year, with a runners-up place at the Galeria Kaufhof Pokal Challenge, and finishing 42nd on the money list. In 2007 he enjoyed his most successful year to date, recording a maiden Challenge Tour win at the MAN NÖ Open and ending 28th on the money list. He has returned to the final stage of Qualifying School a further four times since 2003, but is still yet to earn a card for the full European Tour.

Hansen uses his full name in order to avoid confusion with his fellow Danish golfer, Anders Hansen.

== Professional wins (3) ==
=== Challenge Tour wins (1) ===
No.	Date	Tournament	Winning score	Margin of victory	Runner-up
1	22 Jul 2007	MAN NÖ Open	−11 (66-68-64-71=269)	3 strokes	(England) Zane Scotland

Challenge Tour playoff record (0–1)

No.	Year	Tournament	Opponent	Result
1	2005	Galeria Kaufhof Pokal Challenge	(England) Gareth Davies	Lost to birdie on first extra hole

=== Nordic Golf League wins (2) ===
No.	Date	Tournament	Winning score	Margin of victory	Runner(s)-up
1	29 Aug 1999	Scandic Hotel Danish Open (as an amateur)	−5 (73-68-70=211)	1 stroke	(Denmark) Søren Hansen
2	3 May 2007	Brundtland Open	−13 (66-69-68=203)	4 strokes	(Denmark) Michael Jürgensen, (Norway) Thomas Nielsen, (Sweden) Johan Wahlqvist

== Team appearances ==
Amateur

- Eisenhower Trophy (representing Denmark): 2002
- Bonallack Trophy (representing Europe): 2002
- European Amateur Team Championship (representing Denmark): 2001, 2003
