= Galeria Kaufhof Pokal Challenge =

German golf tournament

Tournament information
- Location: Korschenbroich, Germany
- Established: 2001
- Course: Golfpark Rittergut Birkhof
- Par: 72
- Length: 6,769 yards (6,190 m)
- Tour: Challenge Tour
- Format: Stroke play
- Prize fund: €115,000
- Month played: June
- Final year: 2005

Tournament record score
- Aggregate: 263 Michael Jonzon (2003)
- To par: −25 as above

Final champion
- (England) Gareth Davies
- Location in Germany Location in North Rhine-Westphalia

The Galeria Kaufhof Pokal Challenge was a golf tournament on the Challenge Tour that was played at Golfclub Rittergut Birkhof in Korschenbroich, Germany from 2001 to 2005.

== Winners ==
Year	Winner	Score	To par	Margin of victory	Runner(s)-up
2005	(England) Gareth Davies	269	−19	Playoff	(Denmark) Anders Schmidt Hansen
2004	(Wales) Garry Houston	271	−17	Playoff	(England) Gary Emerson
2003	(Sweden) Michael Jonzon	263	−25	2 strokes	(England) Phillip Archer (Sweden) Chris Hanell (England) David Ryles
2002	(Germany) Alex Čejka	271	−17	2 strokes	(England) John E. Morgan (Germany) Marcel Siem
2001	(Germany) Wolfgang Huget	270	−22	3 strokes	(Germany) Tino Schuster
