= 2005 EPD Tour =

Golf tour season

2005 EPD Tour season
- Duration: 17 February 2005 – 16 October 2005
- Number of official events: 19
- Most wins: (Germany) Nicolas Meitinger (4)
- Order of Merit: (Germany) Nicolas Meitinger

The 2005 EPD Tour, titled as the 2005 Renault EPD Tour for sponsorship reasons, was the ninth season of the EPD Tour, a third-tier tour recognised by the European Tour.

== Schedule ==
The following table lists official events during the 2005 season.

Date	Tournament	Host country	Purse (€)	Winner (Note: The number in brackets after each winner's name is the number of EPD Tour events they had won up to and including that tournament. It is rare for someone to accumulate many wins on the EPD Tour as success at this level usually leads to promotion to the Challenge Tour.)
19 Feb	Oliva Nova Classic	Spain	35,000	(France) Anthony Grenier (2)
6 Apr	Jakobsberg Classic	Germany	25,000	(Germany) Marcel Haremza (3)
20 Apr	Paderborner Classic	Germany	25,000	(England) Andrew Willey (1)
1 May	Hassberge Classic	Germany	22,500	(Germany) Matthias Ziegler (3)
11 May	Gleidingen Classic	Germany	20,000	(Germany) Nicolas Meitinger (1)
17 May	Bad Abbach-Deutenhof Classic	Germany	20,000	(Germany) Marcel Haremza (4)
1 Jun	Lich Classic	Germany	22,500	(Denmark) Kasper Linnet Jørgensen (1)
8 Jun	Baloise Esprit Pro Tour	France	18,500	(Germany) Wolfgang Huget (1)
14 Jun	Central German Classic	Germany	20,000	(Germany) Martin Kaymer (a) (1)
28 Jun	Coburg Brose Open	Germany	30,000	(Germany) Dennis Küpper (1)
5 Jul	Central European Open	Germany	20,000	(Germany) Nicolas Meitinger (2)
18 Jul	Barockstadt Schärding Classic	Austria	20,000	(England) Matt Green (1)
21 Jul	Hohenpähl Classic	Germany	15,000	(Germany) Matthias Ziegler (4)
27 Jul	Höslwang Classic	Germany	17,500	(Germany) Nicolas Meitinger (3)
10 Aug	Sybrook Classic	Netherlands	17,500	(Germany) Nicolas Meitinger (4)
24 Aug	Schloss Meisdorf Classic	Germany	15,000	(France) Anthony Grenier (3)
7 Sep	Holledau Classic	Germany	17,500	(England) Lee Spencer (1)
28 Sep	Märkischer Classic	Germany	15,000	(France) Anthony Grenier (4)
16 Oct	Schönbuch PGA Tour Championship	Germany	25,000	(France) Émilien Chamaulte (1)

== Order of Merit ==
The Order of Merit was based on prize money won during the season, calculated in Euros. The top five players on the Order of Merit (not otherwise exempt) earned status to play on the 2006 Challenge Tour.

Position	Player	Prize money (€)	Status earned
1	(Germany) Nicolas Meitinger	20,280	Qualified for Challenge Tour (made cut in Q School)
2	(Germany) Marcel Haremza	17,272	Promoted to Challenge Tour
3	(France) Anthony Grenier	17,178	Promoted to Challenge Tour
4	(Germany) Wolfgang Huget	16,280	Promoted to Challenge Tour
5	(Germany) Dennis Küpper	13,771	Promoted to Challenge Tour
6	(Denmark) Kasper Linnet Jørgensen	13,394	Promoted to Challenge Tour
7	(Netherlands) John Bleys	13,061	
8	(England) Andrew Willey	11,184	
9	(Germany) Patrick Niederdrenk	10,805	
10	(Germany) Matthias Ziegler	10,360	
