= Garry Houston =

Welsh professional golfer

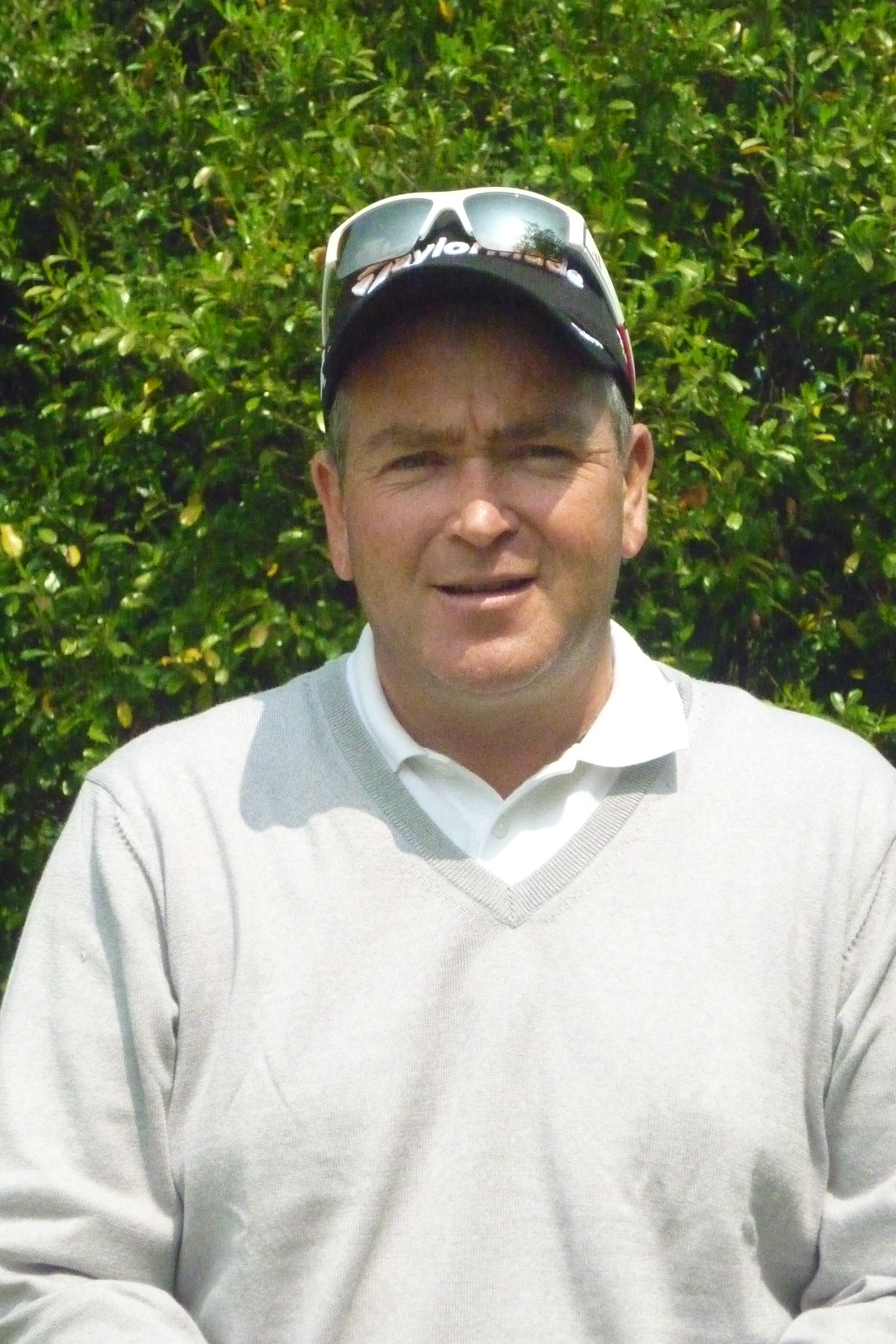

Personal information
- Nationality: Wales
- Born: 12 May 1971 (age 55) St. Asaph, Wales
- Height: 1.86 m (6 ft 1 in)
- Weight: 107 kg (236 lb; 16.8 st)

Career
- Sport: Golf
- Turned professional: 1995
- Former tours: European Tour; Sunshine Tour; Challenge Tour
- Professional wins: 4

Number of wins by tour
- Challenge Tour: 1
- Other: 3

Achievements and awards
- Sunshine Tour Rookie of the Year: 2004–05

Garry Houston (born 12 May 1971) is a Welsh professional golfer.

== Career ==
Houston began his golfing career as a caddie, and won the Welsh Amateur in 1994 before turning professional in 1995. He began playing on the second-tier Challenge Tour in 2000, and at the end of that season won promotion to the European Tour via qualifying school. He returned to the Challenge Tour for 2002 however, and played there for the following three seasons. In 2004 he won his first Challenge Tour title at the Galeria Kaufhof Pokal Challenge, and finished the season tenth in the rankings to earn a return to the European Tour. Houston's second spell at that level was more successful, and he played on the Tour for the following four seasons. In 2009 he divided his playing time between the European and Challenge tours, and since then has returned full-time to the Challenge Tour.

Houston's best results on the European Tour to date were two fourth-place finishes, in the 2000 North West of Ireland Open and the 2005 Omega European Masters. His best season was 2006, when he ended 74th in the Order of Merit.

== Professional wins (4) ==
=== Challenge Tour wins (1) ===
No.	Date	Tournament	Winning score	Margin of victory	Runner-up
1	27 Jun 2004	Galeria Kaufhof Pokal Challenge	−17 (72-68-66-65=271)	Playoff	(England) Gary Emerson

Challenge Tour playoff record (1–0)

No.	Year	Tournament	Opponent	Result
1	2004	Galeria Kaufhof Pokal Challenge	(England) Gary Emerson	Won with par on fourth extra hole

=== Other wins (3) ===
- 2012 Leeds Cup
- 2015 Welsh National PGA Championship, Leeds Cup

== Team appearances ==
Amateur

- European Amateur Team Championship (representing Wales): 1991, 1995

Professional

- PGA Cup (representing Great Britain and Ireland): 2017 (winners)
