= Ivó Giner =

Spanish professional golfer (born 1976)

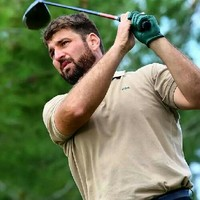

Personal information
- Nationality: Spain
- Born: 21 June 1976 (age 50) Barcelona, Spain
- Height: 5 ft 10 in (1.78 m)
- Spouse: Raquel Ortiz
- Children: 2

Career
- Sport: Golf
- Turned professional: 1996
- Former tours: European Tour; Challenge Tour
- Professional wins: 8

Number of wins by tour
- Challenge Tour: 3
- Other: 5

Ivó Giner (born 21 June 1976) is a Spanish professional golfer who played on the European Tour.

== Early life and amateur career ==
In 1994 and 1996, Giner represented Spain in the Eisenhower Trophy. He secured a third-place finish together with Sergio García, José Manuel Lara and Álvaro Salto. In 1996, he won the Spanish International Youth Championship, a year after losing a playoff against Cea and García in the Spanish Amateur Championship.

== Professional career ==
In 1996, Giner turned professional. He joined the Challenge Tour where he had immediate success winning the 1997 Open dei Tessali. He played on the European Tour in 1998 and 2000 but lost his card at the end of the 2000 season and did not manage to come through the Challenge Tour Rankings or the Qualifying School in either 2001 or 2002. Winning both the Open des Volcans Challenge de France and the Golf Padova Terme Euganee International Open on the Challenge Tour in July 2003 meant that he regained his playing privileges for the European Tour, where he played in 2004 and 2005.

The closest Giner came to winning in the European Tour was at the 2002 Madeira Island Open. He led the tournament after the third round but finished as the runner-up, one stroke behind Diego Borrego, after bogeying the final hole.

In July 2003, Giner recorded a score of −29 (63-68-64-64=259) at the 2003 Golf Padova Terme Euganee International Open. This equalled the European Tour-affiliated tournament record of a total of 29 under par set by Ernie Els at the 2003 Johnnie Walker Classic.

Giner shot a stunning 11-under-par 60 in the second round of the 2005 Madrid Open, equalling the European Tour record at the time. After a 32 at the turn, he raced home in just 28 with an eagle and seven birdies. He needed to birdie the last two holes for 59 but left a 14-foot attempt just short on the 17th, before making a 12-footer on the final hole. Due to the use of preferred lies at Club de Campo, Giner's score does not officially count as a record equalling effort.

== Amateur wins ==
- 1996 Spanish International Youth Championship

== Professional wins (8) ==
=== Challenge Tour wins (3) ===
No.	Date	Tournament	Winning score	Margin of victory	Runner-up
1	29 Jun 1997	Open dei Tessali	−4 (70-70-68-72=280)	3 strokes	(Australia) Stephen Leaney
2	13 Jul 2003	Open des Volcans – Challenge de France	−15 (68-67-67-67=269)	3 strokes	(Scotland) David Patrick
3	27 Jul 2003	Golf Padova Terme Euganee International Open	−29 (63-68-64-64=259)	1 stroke	(Sweden) Martin Erlandsson

=== Spanish Tour wins (4) ===
No.	Date	Tournament	Winning score	Margin of victory	Runner-up
1	20 Sep 2001	Campionat de Catalunya	−11 (68-68-65=201)	2 strokes	(Spain) Ignacio Garrido
2	20 Jun 2004	Campeonato de España de Profesionales	−6 (71-76-67-68=282)	1 stroke	(Spain) Carlos García Simarro
3	11 Sep 2004	Peugeot Tour de Barcelona	−12 (70-67-67=204)	1 stroke	(Spain) Víctor Casado
4	11 Mar 2006	Peugeot Tour de Sevilla	−6 (67-73-70=210)	4 strokes	(Spain) Santiago Luna

=== French Tour wins (1) ===
No.	Date	Tournament	Winning score	Margin of victory	Runner-up
1	20 Mar 2010	Internationaux de France Professionnels	−16 (69-69-65-65=268)	1 stroke	(France) Adrien Bernadet

== Team appearances ==
Amateur

- Junior Golf World Cup (representing Spain): 1992, 1994
- European Boys' Team Championship (representing Spain): 1992,1994
- European Youths' Team Championship (representing Spain): 1996
- Eisenhower Trophy (representing Spain): 1994, 1996
- St Andrews Trophy (representing Continent of Europe): 1996
