= Andrew Sherborne =

English golfer (born 1961)

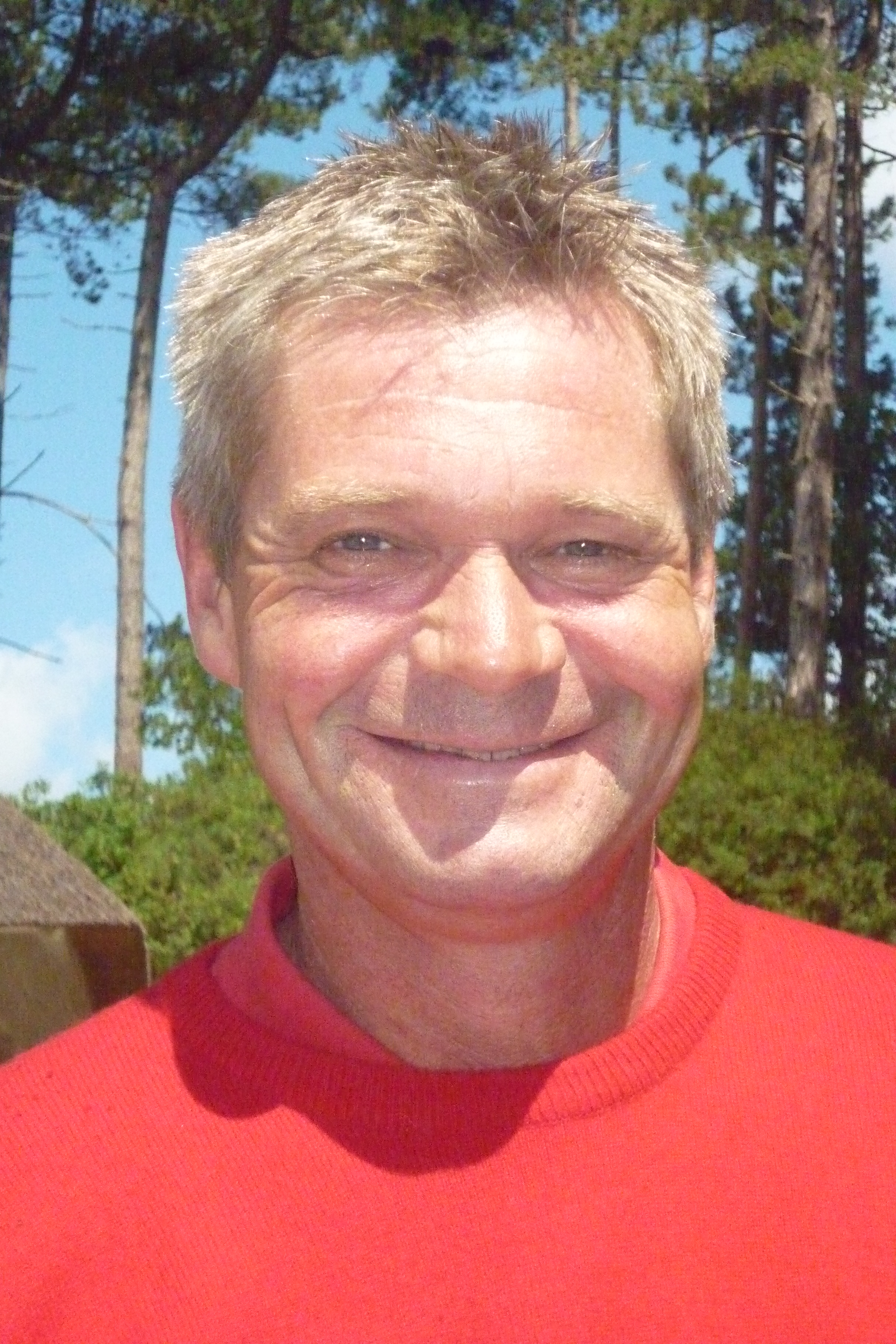

Personal information
- Nationality: England
- Born: 11 March 1961 (age 65) Bristol, England
- Height: 6 ft 4 in (1.93 m)

Career
- Sport: Golf
- Turned professional: 1984
- Former tours: European Tour; Challenge Tour
- Professional wins: 4

Number of wins by tour
- European Tour: 2
- Challenge Tour: 1
- Other: 1

Best results in major championships
- Masters Tournament: DNP
- PGA Championship: DNP
- U.S. Open: DNP
- The Open Championship: T17: 1991

Andrew Sherborne (born 11 March 1961) is an English professional golfer.

== Early life and amateur career ==
In 1961, Sherborne was born in Bristol. He was the leading amateur at The Open Championship in 1984.

== Professional career ==
In 1984, Sherborne turned professional. He played on the European Tour for nearly twenty years, winning the 1991 Madrid Open and the 1992 Peugeot Spanish Open. Towards the end of his tournament career he struggled to hold his place on the main tour, and during this period he picked up his third professional win at the Challenge Tour's 2001 Open Golf Montecchia - PGA Triveneta. His highest placing on the European Tour's Order of Merit was 30th in 1992.

== Professional wins (4) ==
=== European Tour wins (2) ===
No.	Date	Tournament	Winning score	Margin of victory	Runner-up
1	28 Apr 1991	Madrid Open	−16 (70-67-69-66=272)	1 stroke	(Spain) Miguel Ángel Martín
2	17 May 1992	Peugeot Spanish Open	−17 (71-66-63-71=271)	1 stroke	(England) Nick Faldo

=== Challenge Tour wins (1) ===
No.	Date	Tournament	Winning score	Margin of victory	Runners-up
1	29 Apr 2001	Open Golf Montecchia - PGA Triveneta	−19 (70-66-67-66=269)	4 strokes	(England) Stuart Little, (France) Marc Pendariès

Challenge Tour playoff record (0–1)

No.	Year	Tournament	Opponent	Result
1	2001	Tusker Kenya Open	(South Africa) Ashley Roestoff	Lost to birdie on first extra hole

=== Other wins (1) ===
- 2011 Farmfoods British Par 3 Championship

== Results in major championships ==
Tournament	1981	1982	1983	1984	1985	1986	1987	1988	1989
The Open Championship	CUT			CUT			CUT	T62	

Tournament	1990	1991	1992	1993	1994	1995	1996	1997	1998	1999
The Open Championship		T17	T68	CUT			CUT			CUT

Note: Sherborne only played in The Open Championship.

Did not play

CUT = missed the half-way cut (3rd round cut in 1984 Open Championship)
"T" = tied

== Team appearances ==
Amateur

- European Youths' Team Championship (representing England): 1982
- St Andrews Trophy (representing Great Britain & Ireland): 1984 (winners)
