= 2004 Challenge Tour =

Golf tour season

2004 Challenge Tour season
- Duration: 12 February 2004 – 24 October 2004
- Number of official events: 29
- Most wins: (Zimbabwe) Marc Cayeux (2) (England) Matthew King (2) (France) Philippe Lima (2) (England) Graeme Storm (2)
- Rankings: (England) Lee Slattery

The 2004 Challenge Tour was the 16th season of the Challenge Tour, the official development tour to the European Tour.

== Schedule ==
The following table lists official events during the 2004 season.

Date	Tournament	Host country	Purse (€)	Winner (Note: The number in brackets after each winner's name is the number of Challenge Tour events they had won up to and including that tournament. This information is only shown for Challenge Tour members. It is rare for someone to accumulate many wins on the Challenge Tour as success at this level usually leads to promotion to the European Tour.)	OWGR points	Other tours (Note: AFR − Sunshine Tour; EUR − European Tour; TLA − Tour de las Américas.)	Notes
15 Feb	Summit Panama Masters	Panama	US$100,000	(Argentina) Miguel Fernández (1)	6	TLA	New to Challenge Tour
22 Feb	Costa Rica Open	Costa Rica	US$110,000	(Italy) Alessandro Tadini (1)	6	TLA	
29 Feb	Abierto Telefónica	Guatemala	US$100,000	(Argentina) Daniel Vancsik (2)	6	TLA	
14 Mar	Stanbic Zambia Open	Zambia	110,000	(South Africa) Michael Kirk (1)	10	AFR	
21 Mar	Kenya Open	Kenya	110,000	(Zimbabwe) Marc Cayeux (2)	6		
28 Mar	Madeira Island Open	Portugal	600,000	(Sweden) Chris Hanell (1)	24	EUR	
25 Apr	Al Ahram-Jolie Ville Sharm El Sheikh Challenge	Egypt	US$125,000	(England) Gareth Davies (1)	6		New tournament
2 May	Peugeot Challenge de León	Spain	110,000	(England) Edward Rush (1)	6		New tournament
9 May	Tessali-Metaponto Open di Puglia e Basilicata	Italy	120,000	(Sweden) Leif Westerberg (1)	6		
6 Jun	Nykredit Danish Open	Denmark	137,500	(England) Matthew Morris (1)	6		
13 Jun	Segura Viudas Challenge de España	Spain	135,000	(France) Philippe Lima (1)	6		
20 Jun	Aa St Omer Open	France	400,000	(France) Philippe Lima (2)	16	EUR	
27 Jun	Galeria Kaufhof Pokal Challenge	Germany	110,000	(Wales) Garry Houston (1)	6		
4 Jul	Volvo Finnish Open	Finland	110,000	(Finland) Roope Kakko (a) (1)	6		
11 Jul	Open des Volcans – Challenge de France	France	125,000	(Sweden) Johan Axgren (1)	6		
17 Jul	Texbond Open	Italy	110,000	(England) Sam Little (2)	6		New tournament
25 Jul	JJB Sports North West Challenge	England	£100,000	(Sweden) Fredrik Henge (5)	6		New tournament
8 Aug	Ryder Cup Wales Challenge	Wales	120,000	(England) Graeme Storm (1)	6		
15 Aug	BMW Russian Open	Russia	US$500,000	(England) Gary Emerson (2)	16	EUR	
22 Aug	Rolex Trophy	Switzerland	163,500	(England) Phillip Archer (1)	6		
22 Aug	Norwegian Challenge	Norway	105,000	(Republic of Ireland) Stephen Browne (1)	6		
29 Aug	Skandia PGA Open	Sweden	SKr 1,000,000	(England) Matthew King (1)	6		
5 Sep	BA-CA Golf Open	Austria	150,000	(Austria) Markus Brier (2)	6		
12 Sep	Telia Grand Prix	Sweden	SKr 1,200,000	(England) Lee Slattery (1)	6		
26 Sep	Open de Toulouse	France	110,000	(Zimbabwe) Marc Cayeux (3)	6		
3 Oct	Estoril Challenge Open Portugal Telecom	Portugal	113,000	(England) Tom Whitehouse (1)	6		
10 Oct	Attijari Wafa - Tikida Beach Moroccan Classic	Morocco	130,000	(England) Graeme Storm (2)	6		
17 Oct	Donnington Grove Computacenter English Challenge Open	England	110,000	(England) Matthew King (2)	6		
24 Oct	Bouygues Telecom Grand Final	France	200,000	(Scotland) David Drysdale (1)	6		Tour Championship

== Rankings ==
The rankings were based on prize money won during the season, calculated in Euros. The top 15 players on the rankings earned status to play on the 2005 European Tour.

Rank	Player	Prize money (€)
1	(England) Lee Slattery	95,980
2	(Italy) Alessandro Tadini	92,121
3	(England) Graeme Storm	81,065
4	(Zimbabwe) Marc Cayeux	75,104
5	(England) Matthew King	73,623
