= Marcus Fraser (golfer) =

Australian professional golfer (born 1978)

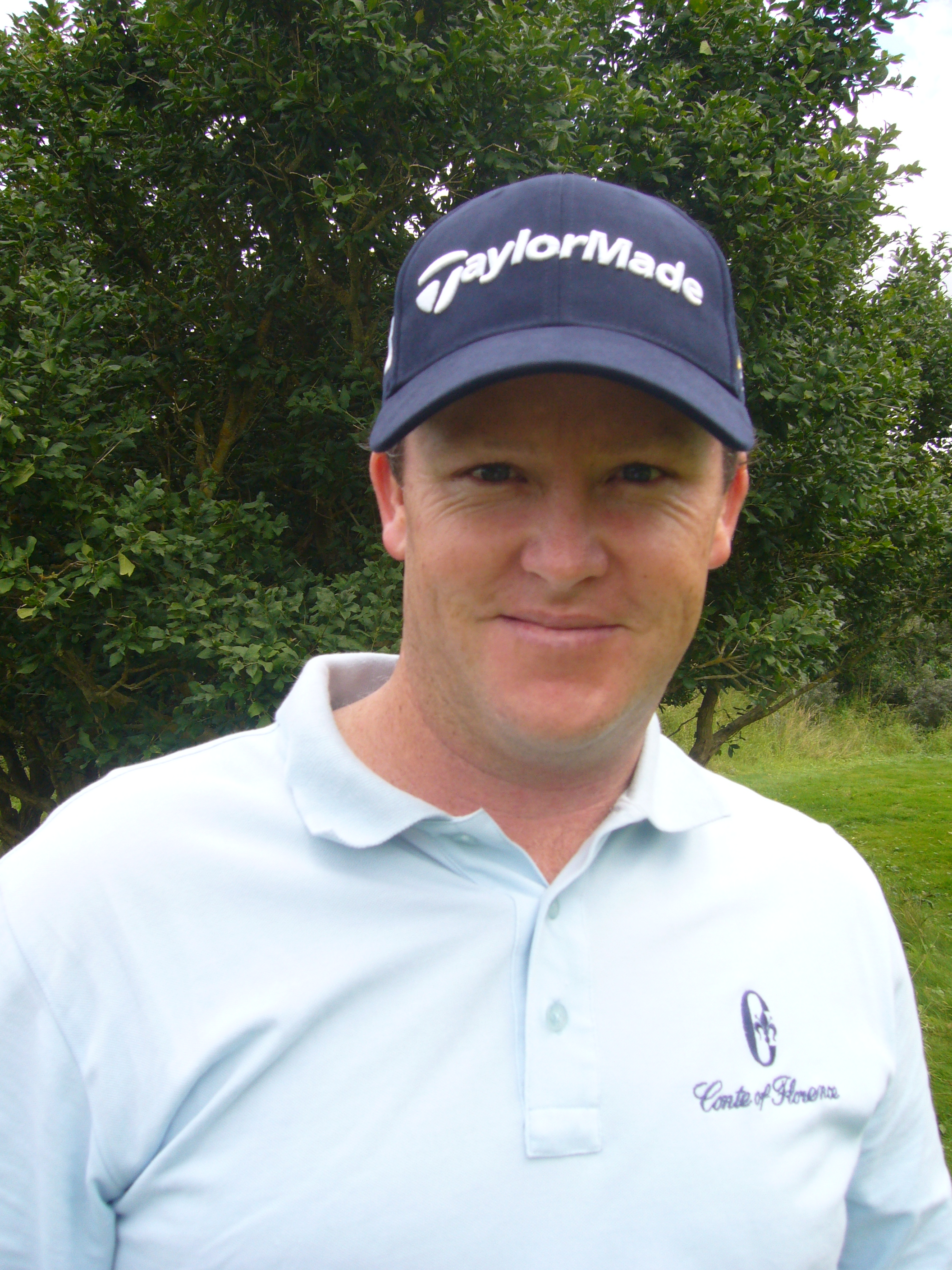
- Fraser at the 2008 KLM Open

Personal information
- Full name: Marcus Fraser
- Nationality: Australia
- Born: 26 July 1978 (age 48) Corowa, NSW, Australia
- Height: 1.83 m (6 ft 0 in)
- Weight: 89 kg (196 lb; 14.0 st)
- Spouse: Carlie (m. 2008)

Career
- Sport: Golf
- Turned professional: 2002
- Current tours: Asian Tour; PGA Tour of Australasia
- Former tours: European Tour; Challenge Tour; Von Nida Tour
- Professional wins: 7
- Highest ranking: 51 (3 February 2013)

Number of wins by tour
- European Tour: 3
- Asian Tour: 2
- PGA Tour of Australasia: 1
- Challenge Tour: 3
- Other: 1

Best results in major championships
- Masters Tournament: DNP
- PGA Championship: T47: 2013
- U.S. Open: T45: 2007
- The Open Championship: T20: 2015

Marcus Fraser (born 26 July 1978) is an Australian professional golfer who currently plays on the PGA Tour of Australasia and Asian Tour. He has won three events on the European Tour and represented Australia at the 2016 Summer Olympics, where he held the 36-hole lead and eventually finished tied for fifth.

== Career ==
Born in Corowa, New South Wales, Fraser spent his early years working at a supermarket. He completed a distinguished amateur career in 2002, finishing as the top individual in the Eisenhower Trophy world teams event.

He turned professional in 2002 and completed his first seasons playing on Europe's second tier Challenge Tour. In 2003, he won three tournaments in one month, the Danish Open, the Talma Finnish Challenge and the Russian Open, which was also a European Tour event. The last of those wins secured his card on the European Tour for 2004. He has maintained his playing status since by consistently finishing inside the top 120 on the Order of Merit, with a best of 25th place in 2012. Fraser has played in over 200 events on the European Tour and his best world ranking position was 51st. He is one of the shortest drivers on Tour, averaging 271 yards off the tee in 2016.

On 25 April 2010, Fraser won the 2010 Ballantine's Championship with a closing 69 to finish four shots clear. Fraser claimed his first victory in seven years, completing a wire-to-wire win during a weather-reduced 54 hole event.

In June 2012, Fraser lost out in a playoff to Danny Willett at the BMW International Open in Cologne. He led after a 64 during round one, but finished with a bogey on the 72nd hole to fall into a playoff. Fraser three-putted the fourth extra hole to lose the tournament when Willett made his chip and putt for par.

Fraser won his third European Tour title at the inaugural Maybank Championship Malaysia in February 2016. He capitalised on a late collapse by leader Lee Soo-min, who had led by two with three holes to play. He won by two strokes, as Lee dropped four strokes in his final three holes, to end a winless drought of almost six years, during which he played in 119 events.

He played in the first Olympic Golf Tournament since 1904 representing Australia with Scott Hend, due to the retirements of compatriots Jason Day, Adam Scott and Marc Leishman. After one round, he led the tournament, posting an 8-under-par 63, setting an Olympic record (tied by Matt Kuchar on the final day). Fraser shot a two-under 69 in the second round, holding the 36-hole lead. He had a bad weekend (72-72) but was still able to finish T5.

== Amateur wins ==
- 1999 Victorian Amateur Championship
- 2001 Asia Pacific Championship
- 2002 New Zealand Amateur

== Professional wins (7) ==
=== European Tour wins (3) ===
No.	Date	Tournament	Winning score	Margin of victory	Runner(s)-up
1	17 Aug 2003	BMW Russian Open^{1}	−19 (68-65-68-68=269)	Playoff	(Austria) Martin Wiegele
2	25 Apr 2010	Ballantine's Championship^{2,3}	−12 (65-70-69=204) (Note: Shortened to 54 holes due to weather.)	4 strokes	(Northern Ireland) Gareth Maybin, (Australia) Brett Rumford
3	21 Feb 2016	Maybank Championship Malaysia^{2}	−15 (66-69-66-68=269)	2 strokes	(South Korea) Lee Soo-min, (Philippines) Miguel Tabuena

^{1}Dual-ranking event with the Challenge Tour
^{2}Co-sanctioned by the Asian Tour
^{3}Co-sanctioned by the Korean Tour

European Tour playoff record (1–3)

No.	Year	Tournament	Opponent(s)	Result
1	2003	BMW Russian Open	(Austria) Martin Wiegele	Won with par on second extra hole
2	2008	Sportsbet Australian Masters	(Australia) Rod Pampling	Lost to par on third extra hole
3	2012	BMW International Open	(England) Danny Willett	Lost to par on fourth extra hole
4	2013	Ballantine's Championship	(Australia) Brett Rumford, (Scotland) Peter Whiteford	Rumford won with eagle on first extra hole

=== Asian Tour wins (2) ===
No.	Date	Tournament	Winning score	Margin of victory	Runners-up
1	25 Apr 2010	Ballantine's Championship^{1,2}	−12 (65-70-69=204)	4 strokes	(Northern Ireland) Gareth Maybin, (Australia) Brett Rumford
2	21 Feb 2016	Maybank Championship Malaysia^{1}	−15 (66-69-66-68=269)	2 strokes	(South Korea) Lee Soo-min, (Philippines) Miguel Tabuena

^{1}Co-sanctioned by the European Tour
^{2}Co-sanctioned by the Korean Tour

Asian Tour playoff record (0–1)

No.	Year	Tournament	Opponents	Result
1	2013	Ballantine's Championship	(Australia) Brett Rumford, (Scotland) Peter Whiteford	Rumford won with eagle on first extra hole

=== PGA Tour of Australasia wins (1) ===
No.	Date	Tournament	Winning score	Margin of victory	Runner-up
1	24 Jan 2021	Gippsland Super 6	−2 (22)	1 stroke	(Switzerland) Alessandro Noseda

PGA Tour of Australasia playoff record (0–2)

No.	Year	Tournament	Opponent(s)	Result
1	2008	Sportsbet Australian Masters	(Australia) Rod Pampling	Lost to par on third extra hole
2	2011	Australian PGA Championship	(Australia) Robert Allenby, (Australia) Greg Chalmers	Chalmers won with par on first extra hole

=== Challenge Tour wins (3) ===
No.	Date	Tournament	Winning score	Margin of victory	Runner(s)-up
1	8 Jun 2003	Nykredit Danish Open	−12 (70-71-69-66=276)	3 strokes	(France) Grégory Bourdy, (Sweden) Joakim Rask
2	3 Aug 2003	Talma Finnish Challenge	−13 (67-66-71-71=275)	Playoff	(Sweden) Tony Edlund
3	17 Aug 2003	BMW Russian Open^{1}	−19 (68-65-68-68=269)	Playoff	(Austria) Martin Wiegele

^{1}Dual-ranking event with the European Tour

Challenge Tour playoff record (2–0)

No.	Year	Tournament	Opponent	Result
1	2003	Talma Finnish Challenge	(Sweden) Tony Edlund	Won with eagle on third extra hole
2	2003	BMW Russian Open	(Austria) Martin Wiegele	Won with par on second extra hole

=== Von Nida Tour wins (1) ===
No.	Date	Tournament	Winning score	Margin of victory	Runner-up
1	30 Mar 2003	Volvo Trucks Klassic	−23 (68-66-69-66=269)	8 strokes	(Australia) Gavin Hills

== Results in major championships ==
Tournament	2005	2006	2007	2008	2009
Masters Tournament					
U.S. Open			T45		
The Open Championship	CUT	T35			
PGA Championship					

Tournament	2010	2011	2012	2013	2014	2015	2016	2017	2018
Masters Tournament									
U.S. Open				CUT		T64			
The Open Championship			CUT	T54		T20	CUT		
PGA Championship			T66	T47			T73		

Tournament	2019
Masters Tournament	
PGA Championship	
U.S. Open	CUT
The Open Championship	

Did not play

CUT = missed the half-way cut
"T" = tied

== Results in World Golf Championships ==
Results not in chronological order before 2015.

Tournament	2010	2011	2012	2013	2014	2015	2016	2017
Championship		T45	T24	T60			60	T58
Match Play				R32			T51	
Invitational	T58						T38	
Champions	T63		T42				T70	

Did not play

QF, R16, R32, R64 = Round in which player lost in match play
"T" = tied
Note that the HSBC Champions did not become a WGC event until 2009.

== Team appearances ==
Amateur

- Nomura Cup (representing Australia): 2001 (winners)
- Eisenhower Trophy (representing Australia): 2002 (individual leader)
- Bonallack Trophy (representing Asia/Pacific): 2002 (winners)
- Australian Men's Interstate Teams Matches (representing Victoria): 1999, 2000 (winner), 2001
