= 2010 EPD Tour =

Golf tour season

2010 EPD Tour season
- Duration: 26 January 2010 – 26 September 2010
- Number of official events: 20
- Most wins: (Germany) Max Kramer (2) (Germany) Nicolas Meitinger (2) (Netherlands) Tim Sluiter (2) (Germany) Daniel Wünsche (2)
- Order of Merit: (Germany) Benjamin Miarka

The 2010 EPD Tour was the 14th season of the EPD Tour, a third-tier tour recognised by the European Tour.

== Schedule ==
The following table lists official events during the 2010 season.

Date	Tournament	Host country	Purse (€)	Winner (Note: The number in brackets after each winner's name is the number of EPD Tour events they had won up to and including that tournament. It is rare for someone to accumulate many wins on the EPD Tour as success at this level usually leads to promotion to the Challenge Tour.)	Other tours (Note: NGL − Nordic Golf League.)
28 Jan	Sueno Dunes Classic	Turkey	30,000	(Germany) Daniel Wünsche (2)	
1 Feb	Sueno Pines Classic	Turkey	30,000	(Sweden) Björn Pettersson (1)	
6 Feb	Montgomerie Classic	Turkey	30,000	(Germany) Nicolas Meitinger (7)	
11 Feb	Lykia Links Classic	Turkey	30,000	(Germany) Nicolas Meitinger (8)	
25 Feb	Al Maaden Classic	Morocco	30,000	(Germany) Daniel Froreich (2)	
2 Mar	Samanah Classic	Morocco	30,000	(Portugal) Tiago Cruz (1)	
6 Mar	Amelkis Classic	Morocco	30,000	(Germany) Marcel Haremza (8)	
19 May	Heidelberg Lobenfeld Classic	Germany	30,000	(Germany) Florian Fritsch (2)	
2 Jun	Augsburg Classic	Germany	30,000	(Germany) Felix Eibl (1)	
11 Jun	Danfoss Masters	Denmark	30,000	(Denmark) Rasmus Hjelm Nielsen (1)	
16 Jun	Licher Classic	Germany	30,000	(Germany) Max Kramer (5)	
24 Jun	Land Fleesensee Classic	Germany	30,000	(Germany) Dennis Küpper (6)	
29 Jun	Coburg Brose Open	Germany	30,000	(Germany) Max Kramer (6)	
14 Jul	Fürst Fugger Privatbank Classic	Germany	30,000	(Scotland) Paul O'Hara (1)	
21 Jul	Pfaffing Classic	Germany	30,000	(Netherlands) Jurrian van der Vaart (1)	
31 Jul	Green Eagle Classic	Germany	30,000	(Sweden) Gustav Adell (n/a)	NGL
11 Aug	Bad Waldsee Classic	Germany	30,000	(Germany) Daniel Wünsche (3)	
18 Aug	Chronos Cup	Germany	30,000	(Netherlands) Tim Sluiter (1)	
7 Sep	Preis des Hardenberg GolfResort	Germany	30,000	(Netherlands) Tim Sluiter (2)	
26 Sep	Fulda EPD Tour Championship	Germany	40,000	(Germany) Benjamin Miarka (2)	

== Order of Merit ==
The Order of Merit was based on prize money won during the season, calculated in Euros. The top five players on the Order of Merit (not otherwise exempt) earned status to play on the 2011 Challenge Tour.

Position	Player	Prize money (€)	Status earned
1	(Germany) Benjamin Miarka	25,641	Promoted to Challenge Tour
2	(Germany) Max Kramer	24,133	Promoted to Challenge Tour
3	(Germany) Daniel Wünsche	21,142	Promoted to Challenge Tour
4	(England) Grant Jackson	20,034	Promoted to Challenge Tour
5	(Netherlands) Tim Sluiter	19,555	Qualified for European Tour (Top 25 in Q School)
6	(Netherlands) Jurrian van der Vaart	19,156	Promoted to Challenge Tour
7	(Germany) Dennis Küpper	17,968	
8	(Portugal) Tiago Cruz	17,775	
9	(Scotland) Paul O'Hara	17,639	
10	(England) Ben Parker	17,582	
