= 2002 Challenge Tour =

Golf tour season

2002 Challenge Tour season
- Duration: 28 February 2002 – 27 October 2002
- Number of official events: 25 (Note: One further tournament was scheduled but was abandoned.)
- Most wins: (England) Lee S. James (3)
- Rankings: (England) Lee S. James

The 2002 Challenge Tour was the 14th season of the Challenge Tour, the official development tour to the European Tour.

== Schedule ==
The following table lists official events during the 2002 season.

Date	Tournament	Host country	Purse (€)	Winner (Note: The number in brackets after each winner's name is the number of Challenge Tour events they had won up to and including that tournament. This information is only shown for Challenge Tour members. It is rare for someone to accumulate many wins on the Challenge Tour as success at this level usually leads to promotion to the European Tour.)	OWGR points	Other tours (Note: AFR − Sunshine Tour; EUR − European Tour.)	Notes
3 Mar	Sameer Kenya Open	Kenya	£75,000	(England) Lee S. James (2)	6		
10 Mar	Stanbic Zambia Open	Zambia	95,000	(Zimbabwe) Marc Cayeux (1)	10	AFR	
24 Mar	Madeira Island Open	Portugal	550,000	(Spain) Diego Borrego (3)	24	EUR	New to Challenge Tour
14 Apr	Panalpina Banque Commerciale du Maroc Classic	Morocco	130,000	(France) Jean-François Lucquin (1)	6		New tournament
28 Apr	Tessali Open del Sud	Italy	90,000	(England) Simon Wakefield (1)	6		
~~5 May~~	Credit Suisse Private Banking Open	Switzerland	–	Abandoned (Note: Tournament abandoned due to persistent bad weather.)	–		
26 May	Izki Challenge de España	Spain	135,000	(Sweden) Fredrik Widmark (1)	6		
2 Jun	Austrian Golf Open	Austria	110,000	(Austria) Markus Brier (1)	6		
9 Jun	Nykredit Danish Open	Denmark	125,000	(Australia) Ed Stedman (1)	6		
16 Jun	Aa St Omer Open	France	330,000	(Belgium) Nicolas Vanhootegem (2)	6		
16 Jun	Galeria Kaufhof Pokal Challenge	Germany	90,000	(Germany) Alex Čejka (4)	6		
23 Jun	Clearstream International Luxembourg Open	Luxembourg	105,000	(England) Lee S. James (3)	6		
30 Jun	Open des Volcans	France	110,000	(United States) Scott Kammann (1)	6		
7 Jul	PGA Triveneta Terme Euganee International Open	Italy	115,000	(Germany) Wolfgang Huget (2)	6		
14 Jul	Volvo Finnish Open	Finland	100,000	(Denmark) Thomas Nørret (1)	6		
21 Jul	Golf Challenge	Germany	100,000	(England) Iain Pyman (4)	6		
28 Jul	Charles Church European Challenge Tour Championship	England	250,000	(England) John E. Morgan (1)	6		
4 Aug	Talma Finnish Challenge	Finland	150,000	(England) Lee S. James (4)	6		
11 Aug	BMW Russian Open	Russia	180,000	(England) Iain Pyman (5)	6		
18 Aug	North West of Ireland Open	Ireland	350,000	(Sweden) Adam Mednick (6)	16	EUR	
25 Aug	Rolex Trophy	Switzerland	CHF 225,000	(England) Simon Hurd (1)	6		
25 Aug	Skandia PGA Open	Sweden	95,000	(France) Thomas Besancenez (1)	6		
8 Sep	Formby Hall Challenge	England	£75,000	(England) Matthew Blackey (1)	6		
15 Sep	Telia Grand Prix	Sweden	SKr 1,100,000	(England) Matthew Blackey (2)	6		
20 Oct	Fortis Bank Challenge Open	Netherlands	135,000	(Belgium) Didier de Vooght (1)	6		
27 Oct	Challenge Tour Grand Final	France	200,000	(Republic of Ireland) Peter Lawrie (1)	6		Tour Championship

== Rankings ==
The rankings were based on prize money won during the season, calculated in Euros. The top 15 players on the rankings earned status to play on the 2003 European Tour.

Rank	Player	Prize money (€)
1	(England) Lee S. James	121,531
2	(France) Jean-François Lucquin	101,544
3	(England) Matthew Blackey	94,121
4	(Republic of Ireland) Peter Lawrie	89,073
5	(England) Iain Pyman	75,674
