= 2003 Challenge Tour =

Golf tour season

2003 Challenge Tour season
- Duration: 30 January 2003 – 26 October 2003
- Number of official events: 28
- Most wins: (Australia) Marcus Fraser (3)
- Rankings: (Sweden) Johan Edfors

The 2003 Challenge Tour was the 15th season of the Challenge Tour, the official development tour to the European Tour.

== Schedule ==
The following table lists official events during the 2003 season.

Date	Tournament	Host country	Purse (€)	Winner (Note: The number in brackets after each winner's name is the number of Challenge Tour events they had won up to and including that tournament. This information is only shown for Challenge Tour members. It is rare for someone to accumulate many wins on the Challenge Tour as success at this level usually leads to promotion to the European Tour.)	OWGR points	Other tours (Note: AFR − Sunshine Tour; EUR − European Tour; TLA − Tour de las Américas.)	Notes
2 Feb	Credomatic MasterCard Costa Rica Open	Costa Rica	US$100,000	(Argentina) Sebastián Fernández (1)	6	TLA	New to Challenge Tour
9 Feb	Telefónica Centro America Abierto de Guatemala	Guatemala	US$100,000	(Argentina) Daniel Vancsik (1)	6	TLA	New to Challenge Tour
16 Feb	American Express Los Encinos Open	Mexico	US$100,000	(England) James Hepworth (1)	6	TLA	New to Challenge Tour
9 Mar	Stanbic Zambia Open	Zambia	100,000	(Sweden) Johan Edfors (1)	10	AFR	
23 Mar	Madeira Island Open	Portugal	600,000	(Wales) Bradley Dredge (3)	24	EUR	
13 Apr	Panalpina Banque Commerciale du Maroc Classic	Morocco	130,000	(Scotland) Greig Hutcheon (3)	6		
11 May	Tessali-Metaponto Open di Puglia e Basilicata	Italy	120,000	(England) Martin LeMesurier (1)	6		
18 May	Izki Challenge de España	Spain	135,000	(Sweden) Martin Erlandsson (1)	6		
25 May	Fortis Challenge Open	Netherlands	135,000	(Sweden) Johan Edfors (2)	6		
8 Jun	Nykredit Danish Open	Denmark	125,000	(Australia) Marcus Fraser (1)	6		
15 Jun	Aa St Omer Open	France	400,000	(Australia) Brett Rumford (1)	16	EUR	
22 Jun	Clearstream International Luxembourg Open	Luxembourg	115,000	(England) Martin LeMesurier (2)	6		
29 Jun	Galeria Kaufhof Pokal Challenge	Germany	110,000	(Sweden) Michael Jonzon (1)	6		
6 Jul	Volvo Finnish Open	Finland	100,000	(England) Jamie Elson (1)	6		
13 Jul	Open des Volcans – Challenge de France	France	125,000	(Spain) Ivó Giner (2)	6		
20 Jul	Kitzbühel Golf Alpin Open	Austria	110,000	(England) David Geall (1)	6		New tournament
27 Jul	Golf Padova Terme Euganee International Open	Italy	108,000	(Spain) Ivó Giner (3)	6		
3 Aug	Talma Finnish Challenge	Finland	150,000	(Australia) Marcus Fraser (2)	6		
17 Aug	BMW Russian Open	Russia	400,000	(Australia) Marcus Fraser (3)	16	EUR	
24 Aug	Rolex Trophy	Switzerland	163,500	(Sweden) Michael Jonzon (2)	6		
31 Aug	Skandia PGA Open	Sweden	SKr 1,000,000	(South Africa) Titch Moore (1)	6		
7 Sep	BA-CA Golf Open	Austria	150,000	(England) Robert Coles (1)	6		
14 Sep	Benmore Developments Northern Ireland Masters	Northern Ireland	£150,000	(Northern Ireland) Darren Clarke (n/a)	6		New tournament
21 Sep	Telia Grand Prix	Sweden	SKr 1,200,000	(Scotland) Euan Little (2)	6		
5 Oct	Open de Toulouse	France	110,000	(Scotland) Scott Drummond (2)	6		New to Challenge Tour
12 Oct	Ryder Cup Wales Challenge	Wales	120,000	(Wales) Craig Williams (1)	6		New tournament
19 Oct	Turespaña Mallorca Classic	Spain	400,000	(Spain) Miguel Ángel Jiménez (n/a)	16	EUR	New tournament
26 Oct	Challenge Tour Grand Final	France	150,000	(Spain) José Manuel Carriles (2)	6		Tour Championship

== Rankings ==
The rankings were based on prize money won during the season, calculated in Euros. The top 15 players on the rankings earned status to play on the 2004 European Tour.

Rank	Player	Prize money (€)
1	(Sweden) Johan Edfors	94,509
2	(England) Martin LeMesurier	88,644
3	(Spain) José Manuel Carriles	86,604
4	(Austria) Martin Wiegele	86,057
5	(Sweden) Peter Hanson	83,663
