= Montecchia Open =

Tournament information
- Location: Padua, Italy
- Established: 2001
- Course: Golf della Montecchia
- Par: 71
- Length: 7,058 yards (6,454 m)
- Tours: Challenge Tour; Alps Tour
- Format: Stroke play
- Prize fund: €250,000
- Month played: May
- Final year: 2016

Tournament record score
- Aggregate: 261 Brooks Koepka (2013)
- To par: −23 as above

Final champion
- (England) Gary King
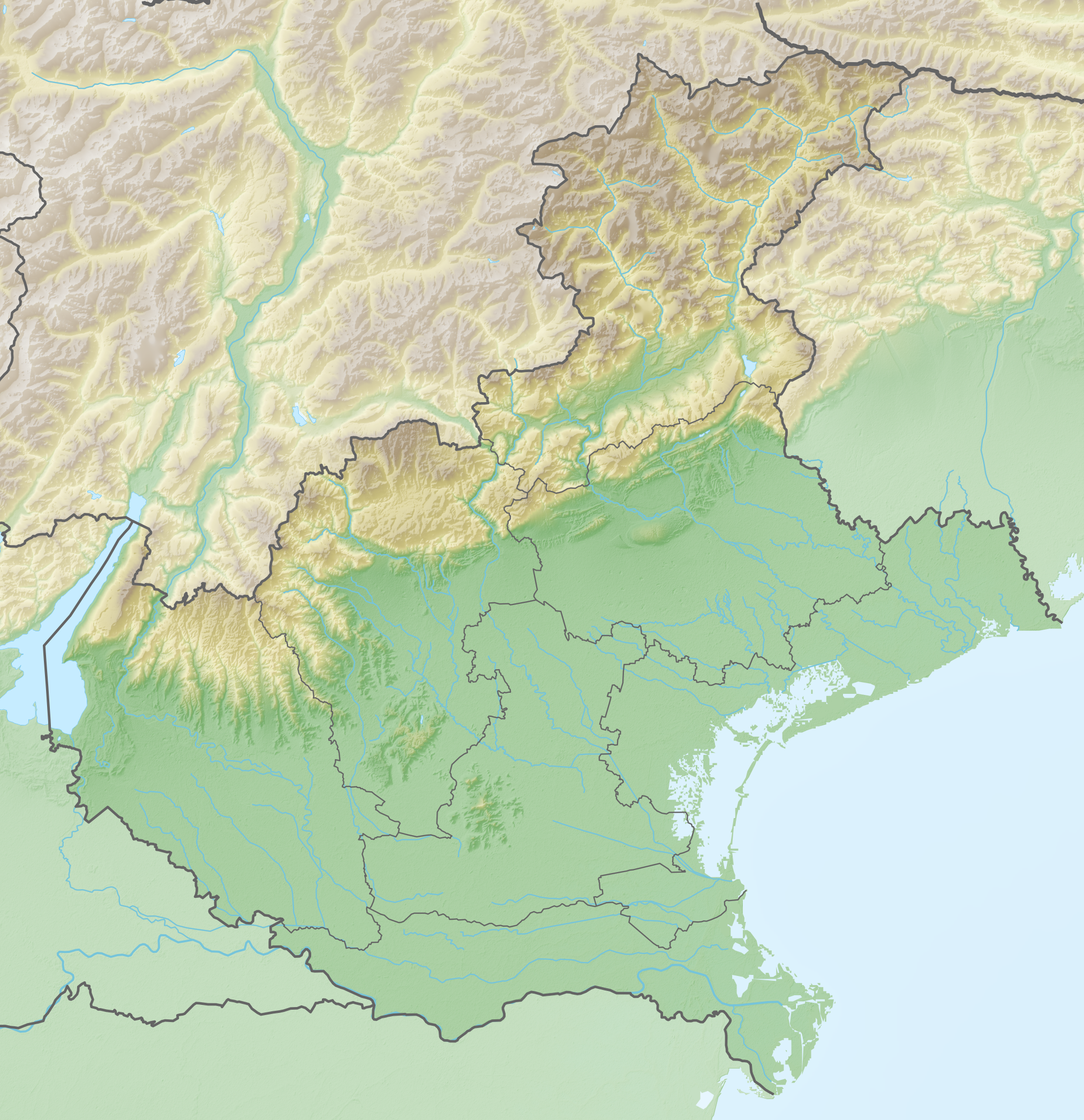
- Location in Italy Location in Veneto

The Montecchia Open was a golf tournament on the Challenge Tour and formerly the Alps Tour. It was played for the first time in 2001 at the Golf Club della Montecchia in Padua, Italy.

== Winners ==
Year	Tour (Note: ALP − Alps Tour; CHA − Challenge Tour.)	Winner	Score	To par	Margin of victory	Runner(s)-up
Montecchia Open
2016	CHA	(England) Gary King	196 (Note: Shortened to 54 holes due to rain.)	−17	1 stroke	(Germany) Moritz Lampert (France) Matthieu Pavon
2014–15: No tournament
Montecchia Golf Open
2013	CHA	(United States) Brooks Koepka	261	−23	7 strokes	(Spain) Agustín Domingo
2012	ALP	(Scotland) Ross Kellett	201	−12	2 strokes	(Italy) Niccolo Quintarelli
2011: No tournament
2010	ALP	(England) Adam Hodkinson	202	−14	3 strokes	(Scotland) Steven Hume (England) Ben Mannix (Slovenia) Gregor Slabe
2002–2009: No tournament
Open Golf Montecchia - PGA Triveneta
2001	CHA	(England) Andrew Sherborne	269	−10	4 strokes	(England) Stuart Little (France) Marc Pendariès

== See also ==
- Terme Euganee International Open, a Challenge Tour from event 2001–03, held at Golf Club della Montecchia in 2002
