= Borås Open =

Tournament information
- Location: Borås, Sweden
- Established: 1994
- Course: Borås Golf Club
- Par: 72
- Tour: Swedish Golf Tour
- Format: Stroke play
- Prize fund: kr 150,000
- Final year: 1997

Tournament record score
- Aggregate: 208 Kristofer Svensson
- To par: −8 as above

Final champion
- (Finland) Mikko Rantanen

Location map
- Location in Sweden

The Borås Open was a golf tournament on the Swedish Golf Tour held from 1994 to 1997. It was played at Borås Golf Cub in Borås, Sweden.

== History ==
The tournament was played in September as the penultimate event of the season for the first three years, and moved to May for the final installment.

It was hosted at Borås Golf Club, which was formed in 1933, and is the 15th oldest in the country.

== Winners ==
Year	Winner	Score	To par	Margin of victory	Runner(s)-up	Purse	Ref.
1997	(Finland) Mikko Rantanen	68-75-66=209	−7	3 strokes	(Sweden) Ulrik Gustafsson	150,000	
1996	(Sweden) Kristofer Svensson (a)	68-69-71=208	−8	Playoff	(Sweden) Jonas Torines (a)	150,000	
1995	(Sweden) Mårten Olander	68-69-73=210	−6	4 strokes	(Sweden) Mattias Eliasson (a) (Sweden) Patrik Gottfridson (Sweden) Fredrik Plan	150,000	
1994	(Sweden) Fredrik Plan	70-69-72=211	−5	3 strokes	(Sweden) Fredrick Månsson (a) (Sweden) Johan Omander	150,000	

== See also ==
- Borås Ladies Open
