= 2001 Challenge Tour =

Golf tour season

2001 Challenge Tour season
- Duration: 1 March 2001 – 4 November 2001
- Number of official events: 29
- Most wins: (France) Sébastien Delagrange (2) (Wales) Jamie Donaldson (2) (England) Chris Gane (2) (England) Mark Foster (2)
- Rankings: (England) Mark Foster

The 2001 Challenge Tour was the 13th season of the Challenge Tour, the official development tour to the European Tour.

== Schedule ==
The following table lists official events during the 2001 season.

Date	Tournament	Host country	Purse (€)	Winner (Note: The number in brackets after each winner's name is the number of Challenge Tour events they had won up to and including that tournament. This information is only shown for Challenge Tour members. It is rare for someone to accumulate many wins on the Challenge Tour as success at this level usually leads to promotion to the European Tour.)	OWGR points	Other tours (Note: AFR − Sunshine Tour; EUR − European Tour.)	Notes
4 Mar	Tusker Kenya Open	Kenya	£75,000	(South Africa) Ashley Roestoff (1)	6		
11 Mar	Stanbic Zambia Open	Zambia	£50,000	(England) Mark Foster (1)	6	AFR	New to Challenge Tour
1 Apr	Segura Viudas Challenge de España	Spain	90,000	(Scotland) Euan Little (1)	6		
29 Apr	Open Golf Montecchia - PGA Triveneta	Italy	115,000	(England) Andrew Sherborne (1)	6		New tournament
6 May	Credit Suisse Private Banking Open	Switzerland	105,000	(Scotland) Greig Hutcheon (2)	6		
20 May	Austrian Open	Austria	90,000	(England) Chris Gane (1)	6		
27 May	Aa St Omer Open	France	150,000	(France) Sébastien Delagrange (1)	6		
3 Jun	NCC Open	Sweden	SKr 840,000	(England) Benn Barham (1)	6		
10 Jun	Nykredit Danish Open	Denmark	110,000	(France) Sébastien Delagrange (2)	6		
17 Jun	Galeria Kaufhof Pokal Challenge	Germany	85,000	(Germany) Wolfgang Huget (1)	6		New tournament
24 Jun	DEXIA-BIL Luxembourg Open	Luxembourg	90,000	(England) Grant Hamerton (1)	6		
1 Jul	Open des Volcans	France	90,000	(Scotland) Scott Drummond (1)	6		
8 Jul	Challenge Total Fina Elf	France	120,000	(England) Kenneth Ferrie (2)	6		New tournament
15 Jul	Volvo Finnish Open	Finland	80,000	(Sweden) Peter Hedblom (4)	6		
22 Jul	Günther Hamburg Classic	Germany	280,000	(Sweden) Peter Hanson (1)	6		
29 Jul	Charles Church European Challenge Tour Championship	England	£130,000	(England) Mark Foster (2)	6		
5 Aug	BMW Russian Open	Russia	£100,000	(Wales) Jamie Donaldson (1)	6		
12 Aug	Talma Finnish Challenge	Finland	150,000	(Sweden) Klas Eriksson (4)	6		New tournament
19 Aug	North West of Ireland Open	Ireland	350,000	(Germany) Tobias Dier (1)	16	EUR	
26 Aug	Rolex Trophy	Switzerland	CHF 150,000	(England) Stuart Little (2)	6		
26 Aug	Skandia PGA Open	Sweden	SKr 800,000	(France) Christophe Pottier (1)	6		
2 Sep	Formby Hall Challenge	England	£50,000	(England) Sam Little (1)	6		
8 Sep	Muermans Real Estate Challenge	Netherlands	120,000	(France) Dominique Nouailhac (1)	6		
16 Sep	Telia Grand Prix	Sweden	SKr 1,100,000	(Wales) Jamie Donaldson (2)	6		
30 Sep	PGA of Austria Masters	Austria	135,000	(England) Iain Pyman (3)	6		New tournament
6 Oct	San Paolo Vita & Asset Management Open	Italy	125,000	(Denmark) Mads Vibe-Hastrup (1)	6		
14 Oct	Hardelot Challenge de France	France	120,000	(Sweden) Mårten Olander (1)	6		
21 Oct	Terme Euganee International Open Padova	Italy	115,000	(England) Chris Gane (2)	6		New tournament
4 Nov	Challenge Tour Grand Final	France	200,000	(England) Richard Bland (1)	6		Tour Championship

== Rankings ==
The rankings were based on prize money won during the season, calculated in Euros. The top 15 players on the rankings earned status to play on the 2002 European Tour.

Rank	Player	Prize money (€)
1	(England) Mark Foster	97,737
2	(Wales) Jamie Donaldson	92,740
3	(England) Philip Golding	79,731
4	(England) Andrew Marshall	75,841
5	(England) Gary Clark	72,950
