= Gary Emerson =

English golfer (born 1963)

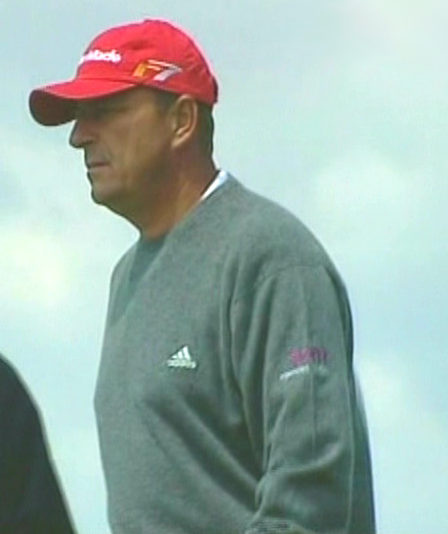
- Emerson at the 2006 BA-CA Golf Open

Personal information
- Full name: Gary Paul Emerson
- Nationality: England
- Born: 26 September 1963 (age 63) Bournemouth, England
- Height: 6 ft 0 in (1.83 m)
- Weight: 202 lb (92 kg; 14.4 st)

Career
- Sport: Golf
- Turned professional: 1982
- Current tour: European Senior Tour
- Former tour: European Tour
- Professional wins: 2

Number of wins by tour
- European Tour: 1
- Challenge Tour: 2

Best results in major championships
- Masters Tournament: DNP
- PGA Championship: DNP
- U.S. Open: DNP
- The Open Championship: T60: 2004

Gary Paul Emerson (born 26 September 1963) is an English professional golfer.

== Career ==
Emerson was born in Bournemouth, Hampshire (now Dorset). He turned professional in 1982 and after regular trips to qualifying school finally made it onto the European Tour in 1995. He has won the 1998 Netcom Norwegian Open on the second-tier Challenge Tour and the 2004 Cadillac Russian Open on the main European Tour. 2005 was his best season to date, with a seventy-second place finish on the European Tour Order of Merit. He finished as joint runner-up at the British Masters in 2006 on his way to 76th place on that seasons money list, but his form fell away after that and he lost his European Tour card at the end of 2007.

== Professional wins (2) ==
=== European Tour wins (1) ===
No.	Date	Tournament	Winning score	Margin of victory	Runner-up
1	15 Aug 2004	BMW Russian Open^{1}	−16 (71-65-68-68=272)	2 strokes	(Austria) Markus Brier

^{1}Dual-ranking event with the Challenge Tour

=== Challenge Tour wins (2) ===
No.	Date	Tournament	Winning score	Margin of victory	Runner-up
1	23 Aug 1998	Netcom Norwegian Open	−17 (74-63-68-70=275)	1 stroke	(Sweden) Max Anglert
2	15 Aug 2004	BMW Russian Open^{1}	−16 (71-65-68-68=272)	2 strokes	(Austria) Markus Brier

^{1}Dual-ranking event with the European Tour

Challenge Tour playoff record (0–1)

No.	Year	Tournament	Opponent	Result
1	2004	Galeria Kaufhof Pokal Challenge	(Wales) Garry Houston	Lost to par on fourth extra hole

== Results in major championships ==
Tournament	1989	1990	1991	1992	1993	1994	1995	1996	1997	1998	1999	2000	2001	2002	2003	2004
The Open Championship	CUT			CUT		CUT		CUT				CUT		CUT	CUT	T60

Note: Emerson only played in The Open Championship.

Did not play

CUT = missed the half-way cut
"T" = tied
