= 1993 European Amateur Team Championship =

Golf competition

Tournament information
- Dates: 30 June – 4 July 1993
- Location: Mariánské Lázně, Czech Republic; 49.979187°N 12.736360°E
- Course: Golf Club Mariánské Lázně
- Organized by: European Golf Association
- Format: Qualification round: 36 holes stroke play Knock-out match-play

Statistics
- Par: 72
- Length: 6,709 yards (6,135 m)
- Field: 20 teams 120 players

Champion
- Wales; Richard Dinsdale, Bradley Dredge, Craig Evans, Richard Johnson, Michael Macara, Calvin O'Carroll
- Qualification round: 731 (+11); Final match: 4–3

Location map
- Location in Europe Location in the Czech Republic

The 1993 European Amateur Team Championship took place 30 June – 4 July at Golf Club Mariánské Lázně, later renamed Royal Golf Club Mariánské Lázně, 6 kilometres from the Mariánské Lázně town (called Marienbad in German) in the Karlovy Vary Region of the Czech Republic. It was the 18th men's golf European Amateur Team Championship.

== Venue ==
The hosting Golf Club Mariánské Lázně was later renamed Royal Golf Club Mariánské Lázně. Its first 9-hole course, located 6 kilometres from the Mariánské Lázně town (called Marienbad in German) in the Karlovy Vary Region of the Czech Republic, opened in 1905 and was extended to 18 holes in 1935.

The championship course was set up with par 72 over 6,709 yards.

== Format ==
Each team consisted of six players, playing two rounds of opening stroke-play qualifying competition over two days, counting the five best scores each day for each team.

The eight best teams formed flight A, in knock-out match-play over the next three days. The teams were seeded based on their positions after the stroke play. The first placed team were drawn to play the quarter final against the eight placed team, the second against the seventh, the third against the sixth and the fourth against the fifth. Teams were allowed to use six players during the team matches, selecting four of them in the two morning foursome games and five players in to the afternoon single games. Games all square at the 18th hole were declared halved, if the team match was already decided.

The eight teams placed 9–16 in the qualification stroke-play formed flight B and the four teams placed 16–20 formed flight C, to play similar knock-out play, with one foursome game and four single games, to decide their final positions.

== Teams ==
20 nation teams contested the event. Each team consisted of six players.

Players in the teams

| Country | Players |
|---|---|
| Austria | Marcus Brier, Philipp Mensi-Klarbach, Rudi Sailer, Hans-Christian Winkler, Mattias Wittman, Nikolaus Zitny |
| Belgium | Christophe Bosmans, Jean-Christophe Gillard, Filip Goovaerts, Arnaud Langenaeken, Nicolas Vanhootegem, Didier de Vooght |
| Czech Republic | Roman Chudoba, Anton Kunsta, Jan Kunsta, Stephan Slezak, Ondrej Trupl, Jan Zitterbart |
| Denmark | Morten Backhausen, Anders Hansen, Thomas Havemann, Jesper Kjaerbye, Søren Kjeldsen, Arild Townhill |
| England | Warren Bennett, Stuart Cage, Ian Garbutt, Lee S. James, Van Phillips, Iain Pyman, Mathew Stanford |
| France | Gregoire Brizay, Christian Cévaër, Janeirik Dahlström, Sébastien Delagrange, Fabrice Stolear, Jean-Yonn Dusson |
| Finland | Juha Kiviharjo, Jari Koljanen, Mikko Manerus, Petri Pulkkinen, Mikko Rantanen, Kalle Väinölä |
| Germany | Philip Drewes, Thomas Himmel, Marc Mazur, Hans-Günther Reiter, Jan-Erik Schapmann, Ulrich Schulte |
| Greece | George Nikitaidis, Pelop Panagopoulos, Eugene Papadopoulos, Tyron Pappas, Steve Partenis, Stathis Toumazanis |
| Ireland | Neil Anderson, Raymond Burns, Jody Fanagan, Pádraig Harrington, Garth McGimpsey, Gary Murphy |
| Iceland | Sigurjön Arnarsson, Thorsteinn Hallgrimeson, Úlfar Jónsson, Bjorn Knútsson, Thordur Olafsson, Björgvin Sigurbergsson |
| Italy | Mario Aragnetti, Federico Bisazza, Marco Cortana, Matteo Natoli, Luca Ruspa, Franco Tosi |
| Netherlands | Maarten van den Berg, Jeroen Germes, Niels Kraay, Maarten Lafeber, Rolf Muntz, Michael Vogel |
| Norway | André Blom, Reidar Brekke, Knut Ekjord, Morten Hagen, Øyvind Rojahn, Hans-Helge Strøm-Olsen |
| Portugal | Joao Pedro Carvalhosa, António Castelo, José Correia, Sean Corte-Real, Ricardo Oliveira, Almerindo Sequeira |
| Scotland | Stephen Gallacher, Gary Hay, David Kirkpatrick, Allan Reid, Dean Robertson, Raymond Russell |
| Spain | Carlos Beautell, Francisco Cea, Álvaro Prat, Francisco Valera, Juan Andrés Vizcaya, José María Zamora |
| Sweden | Max Anglert, Freddie Jacobson, Mikael Lundberg, Henrik Nyström, Mårten Olander, Leif Westerberg |
| Switzerland | Dimitri Bieri, Juan Ciola, Patrick Kressig, Arthur Reich, Alain Krapl, Stefan Gort |
| Wales | Richard Dinsdale, Bradley Dredge, Craig Evans, Richard Johnson, Michael Macara, Calvin O'Carroll |

== Winners ==
Team England and team Sweden was tied leaders of the qualifying competition, each with a 1-under-par score of 719, but England declared the winner, with the better total of the two non-counting scores.

There was no official award for the lowest individual score, but individual leader was Henrik Nyström, Sweden, with an 8-under-par score of 136, two strokes ahead of nearest competitor. Nyström shot a new course record by two shots with a score of 65 in his first 18-hole-round.

Team Wales won the gold medal, earning their first title, beating, defending champions and eight time winners, team England in the final 4–3.

France, earned the bronze on third place, after beating Sweden 4–3 in the bronze match

== Results ==
Qualification round

Team standings

| Place | Country | Score | To par |
|---|---|---|---|
| T1 | England * | 360-359=719 | −1 |
| T1 | Sweden | 358-361=719 | −1 |
| 3 | Wales | 368-363=731 | +11 |
| 4 | France | 360-374=734 | +14 |
| 5 | Scotland | 365-370=735 | +15 |
| 6 | Ireland | 366-372=738 | +18 |
| T7 | Denmark * | 372-367=739 | +19 |
| T7 | Austria * | 370-369=739 | +19 |
| T7 | Germany | 365-374=739 | +19 |
| 10 | Norway | 365-375=740 | +20 |
| 11 | Netherlands | 368-373=741 | +21 |
| 12 | Portugal | 376-370=746 | +26 |
| 13 | Italy * | 373-375=748 | +28 |
| 13 | Spain | 380-368=748 | +28 |
| 15 | Finland | 374-375=749 | +29 |
| 16 | Belgium | 375-376=751 | +31 |
| 17 | Greece | 374-381=755 | +35 |
| 18 | Iceland | 385-374=759 | +39 |
| 19 | Switzerland | 385-383=768 | +48 |
| 20 | Czech Republic | 390-403=793 | +73 |

* Note: In the event of a tie the order was determined by the best total of the two non-counting scores of the two rounds.

Individual leaders

| Place | Player | Country | Score | To par |
|---|---|---|---|---|
| 1 | Henrik Nyström | Sweden | 65-71=136 | −8 |
| 2 | Hans-Günther Reiter | Germany | 67-71=138 | −6 |
| T3 | Freddie Jacobson | Sweden | 73-66=139 | −5 |
| T3 | Nicolas Vanhootegem | Belgium | 70-69=139 | −5 |
| T5 | Úlfar Jónsson | Iceland | 69-71=140 | −4 |
| T5 | Tyron Pappas | Greece | 70-70=140 | −4 |
| T7 | Stuart Cage | England | 71-70=141 | −3 |
| T7 | Rudi Sailer | Austria | 69-72=141 | −3 |
| 9 | Rolf Muntz | Netherlands | 69-73=142 | −2 |

Note: There was no official award for the lowest individual score.

Flight A

Bracket

Quarter finals
Sweden | 5
Denmark | 2
Wales | 4.5
Ireland | 2.5
France | 5
Scotland | 2
England | 5.5
Austria | 1.5

Semi finals
Wales | 5
Sweden | 2
England | 4
France | 3

Final
Wales | 4
England | 3
Bronze match
France | 4.5
Sweden | 2.5

Elimination matches
Ireland | 4.5
Denmark | 2.5
Scotland | 6
Austria | 1

Match for 5th place
Ireland | 6
Scotland | 1
Match for 7th place
Denmark | 4
Austria | 3

Final games

| Wales | England |
| 4 | 3 |
| B. Dredge / R.Johnson 6 & 4 | I. Pyman / S. Cage |
| R. Dinsdale / C. O'Carroll 3 & 1 | M. Stanford / V. Phillips |
| Bradley Dredge 3 & 1 | Warren Bennett |
| Richard Johnson | Ian Pyman 1 hole |
| Craig Evans | Stuart Cage 2 & 1 |
| Calvin O'Carroll | Mathew Stanford 1 hole |
| Michael Macara 1 hole | Van Phillips |

Flight B

Bracket

Round 1
Germany | 3
Belgium | 2
Italy | 3
Portugal | 2
Spain | 4.5
Netherlands | 0.5
Norway | 3
Finland | 2

Round 2
Germany | 3
Italy | 2
Norway | 3
Spain | 2

Match for 9th place
Germany | 3
Norway | 2
Match for 11th place
Spain | 4
Italy | 1

Elimination matches
Belgium | 3.5
Portugal | 1.5
Finland | 3.5
Netherlands | 1.5

Match for 13th place
Belgium | 3
Finland | 2
Match for 15th place
Netherlands | 3.5
Portugal | 1.5

Flight C

Round 1
Greece | 4
Czech Republic | 1
Iceland | 3
Switzerland | 2

Match for 17th place
Greece | 3
Iceland | 2
Match for 19th place
Switzerland | 5
Czech Republic | 0

Final standings

| Place | Country |
|---|---|
| 1st place, gold medalist(s) | Wales |
| 2nd place, silver medalist(s) | England |
| 3rd place, bronze medalist(s) | France |
| 4 | Sweden |
| 5 | Ireland |
| 6 | Scotland |
| 7 | Denmark |
| 8 | Austria |
| 9 | Germany |
| 10 | Norway |
| 11 | Spain |
| 12 | Italy |
| 13 | Belgium |
| 14 | Finland |
| 15 | Netherlands |
| 16 | Portugal |
| 17 | Greece |
| 18 | Iceland |
| 19 | Switzerland |
| 20 | Czech Republic |

== See also ==
- Eisenhower Trophy – biennial world amateur team golf championship for men organized by the International Golf Federation.
- European Ladies' Team Championship – European amateur team golf championship for women organised by the European Golf Association.
