= Terme Euganee International Open =

Golf Padova Terme Euganee International Open
Tournament information
- Location: Padua, Italy
- Established: 2001
- Course: Padova Golf Club
- Par: 72
- Length: 6,612 yards (6,046 m)
- Tour: Challenge Tour
- Format: Stroke play
- Prize fund: €108,000
- Month played: July
- Final year: 2003

Tournament record score
- Aggregate: 259 Ivó Giner (2003)
- To par: −29 as above

Final champion
- (Spain) Ivó Giner
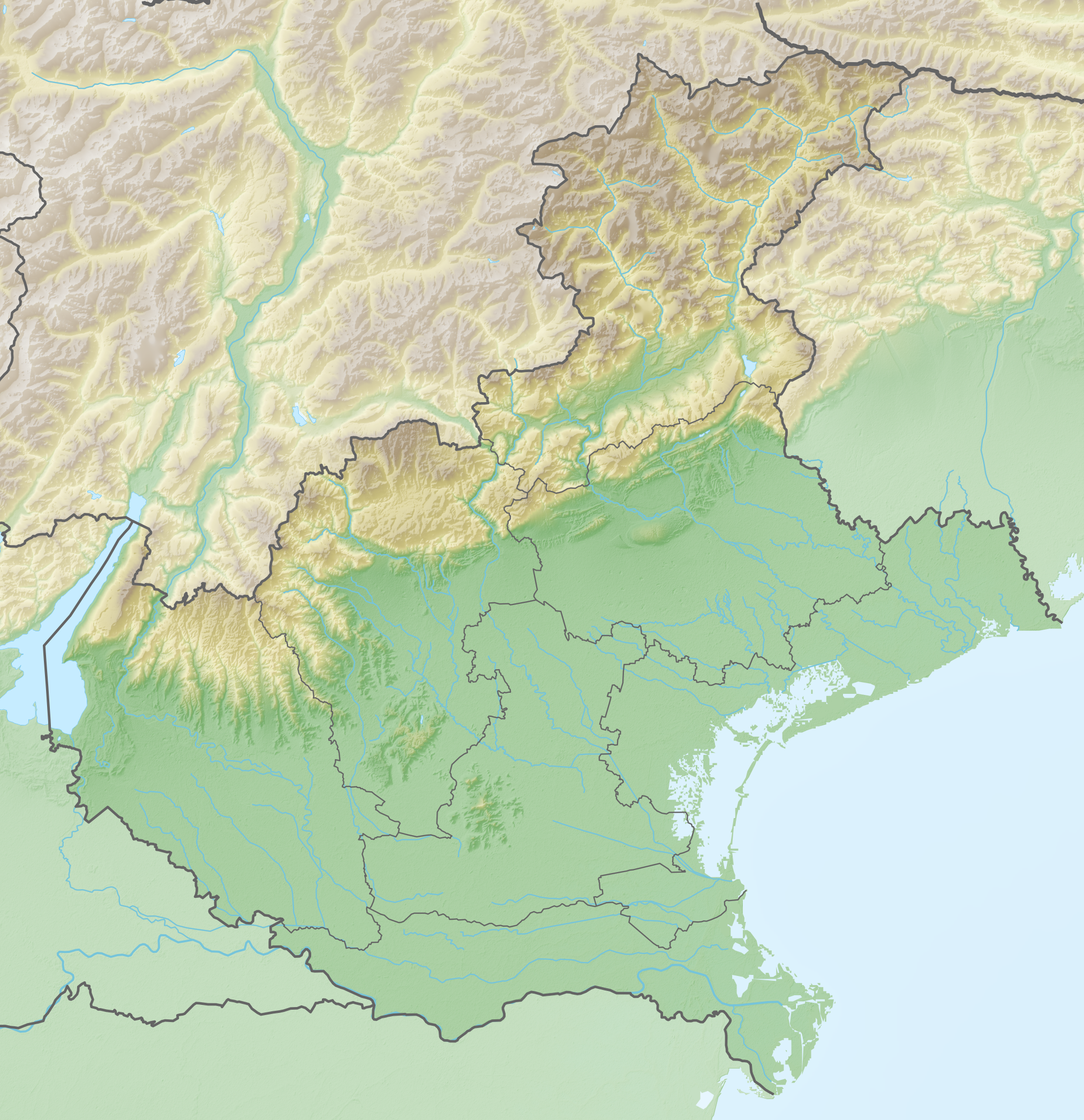
- Location in Italy Location in Veneto

The Terme Euganee International Open was a golf tournament on the Challenge Tour. It was played between 2001 and 2003 in Padua, Italy.

In 2003, Spaniard Ivó Giner fought off his playing partner Martin Erlandsson by one stroke to card a 29-under-par 259 total – the lowest in Challenge Tour history.

Montecchia Golf Club, which hosted the 2002 event, has hosted Challenge Tour events on three other occasions.

== Winners ==
Year	Winner	Score	To par	Margin of victory	Runner(s)-up	Venue
Golf Padova Terme Euganee International Open
2003	(Spain) Ivó Giner	259	−29	1 stroke	(Sweden) Martin Erlandsson	Padova
PGA Triveneta Terme Euganee International Open
2002	(Germany) Wolfgang Huget	268	−20	2 strokes	(France) François Delamontagne	Montecchia
Terme Euganee International Open Padova
2001	(England) Chris Gane	265	−23	1 stroke	(Sweden) Mattias Nilsson (England) Philip Golding	Padova

== See also ==
- Montecchia Golf Open – other Challenge Tour events at Montecchia Golf Club in 2001, 2013, and 2016
