= Mårten Olander =

Swedish professional golfer (born 1971)

Personal information
- Nationality: Sweden
- Born: 5 November 1971 (age 54) Uppsala, Sweden
- Height: 1.93 m (6 ft 4 in)
- Weight: 85 kg (187 lb; 13.4 st)

Career
- Sport: Golf
- College: University of Alabama
- Turned professional: 1995
- Former tours: European Tour; Challenge Tour
- Professional wins: 2

Number of wins by tour
- Challenge Tour: 1
- Other: 1

Best results in major championships
- Masters Tournament: DNP
- PGA Championship: DNP
- U.S. Open: DNP
- The Open Championship: T66: 2004

Achievements and awards
- Ben Hogan Award: 1993

Mårten Olander (born 5 November 1971) is a Swedish professional golfer.

== Career ==
Olander attended the University of Alabama for four years. He was awarded the Ben Hogan Award for the best college golfer in the United States in 1993.

In 1995, Olander turned professional. He joined the Challenge Tour in 1996, winning promotion to the European Tour in his debut season. He returned to the Challenge Tour for 1999, and spent three further seasons there before winning his first professional tournament at the 2001 Hardelot Challenge de France, sealing his return to the full European Tour. He spent a further five seasons at the highest level, before a dramatic slump in form saw him make only three cuts in 2006, since when he has played rarely.

Olander's best result on the European Tour was a four-way tie for second at the 2003 Telefonica Open de Madrid. 2003 was also his most successful season, as he ended 61st on the Order of Merit.

In 2008, Olander was joint captain of the successful European Palmer Cup team.

== Awards and honors ==
In 1993, Olander was bestowed the Ben Hogan Award, given to the top college golfer in the United States

== Professional wins (2) ==
=== Challenge Tour wins (1) ===
No.	Date	Tournament	Winning score	Margin of victory	Runner-up
1	14 Oct 2001	Hardelot Challenge de France	−16 (68-68-62-70=268)	1 stroke	(Scotland) Scott Drummond

=== Swedish Golf Tour wins (1) ===
No.	Date	Tournament	Winning score	Margin of victory	Runners-up
1	10 Sep 1995	Borås Open	−6 (68-69-73=210)	4 strokes	(Sweden) Mattias Eliasson, (Sweden) Patrik Gottfridson, (Sweden) Fredrik Plan

== Results in major championships ==
Tournament	2003	2004
The Open Championship	CUT	T66

Note: Olander only played in The Open Championship.
CUT = missed the half-way cut
"T" = tied

== Team appearances ==
Amateur

- European Amateur Team Championship (representing Sweden): 1993

== See also ==
- Alabama Crimson Tide golf
