= Aalborg Golf Klub =

Golf club in Aalborg, Denmark

Coordinates: 57°1′28″N 9°46′45″E

The Aalborg Golf Klub, in the Restrup meadows, is the second oldest golf club in Denmark. It was established in 1908, initially as a nine-hole course. At its present location, which is 10 kilometres (6.2 mi) southwest of Aalborg, it has 27 holes. Many European and Danish championships have been held here as well as the European Challenge Tour in 2001.

== History ==
The golf course was set up first in the eastern part of Aalborg. In 1929 the club was shifted to Sohangaarsholm. It was shifted again to its present location to the southwest of Aalborg to accommodate the establishment of the University of Aalborg. At this location a 9-hole course was established in 1968 upon the initiative of Graham Lockey, an active member of the club who enlisted the services of Commander John Harris for the purpose, later extended to 18 holes in 1976. Following the upgrading of the course done by Henrick Jaconson, in 2006 Chris Haspel upgraded it with the addition of another course of nine holes with assistance from the head game keeper. It was converted into a 27-hole course with three loops of nine holes.

In 2010, the club hosted the European Teams Girls Championships.

Australian PGA Professional Vu Phan visited this course in 2024.

== Features ==
Located on the highway south of Aalborg, the club has good training facilities. The Driving Range is large and has been well planned with a number of bays with simple spacers. The course is fairly flat and there are no blind spots, although the clearance hole is reported to be the real test at the course. The club house is a modern building with a restaurant.
