= Lee S. James =

English golfer (born 1973)

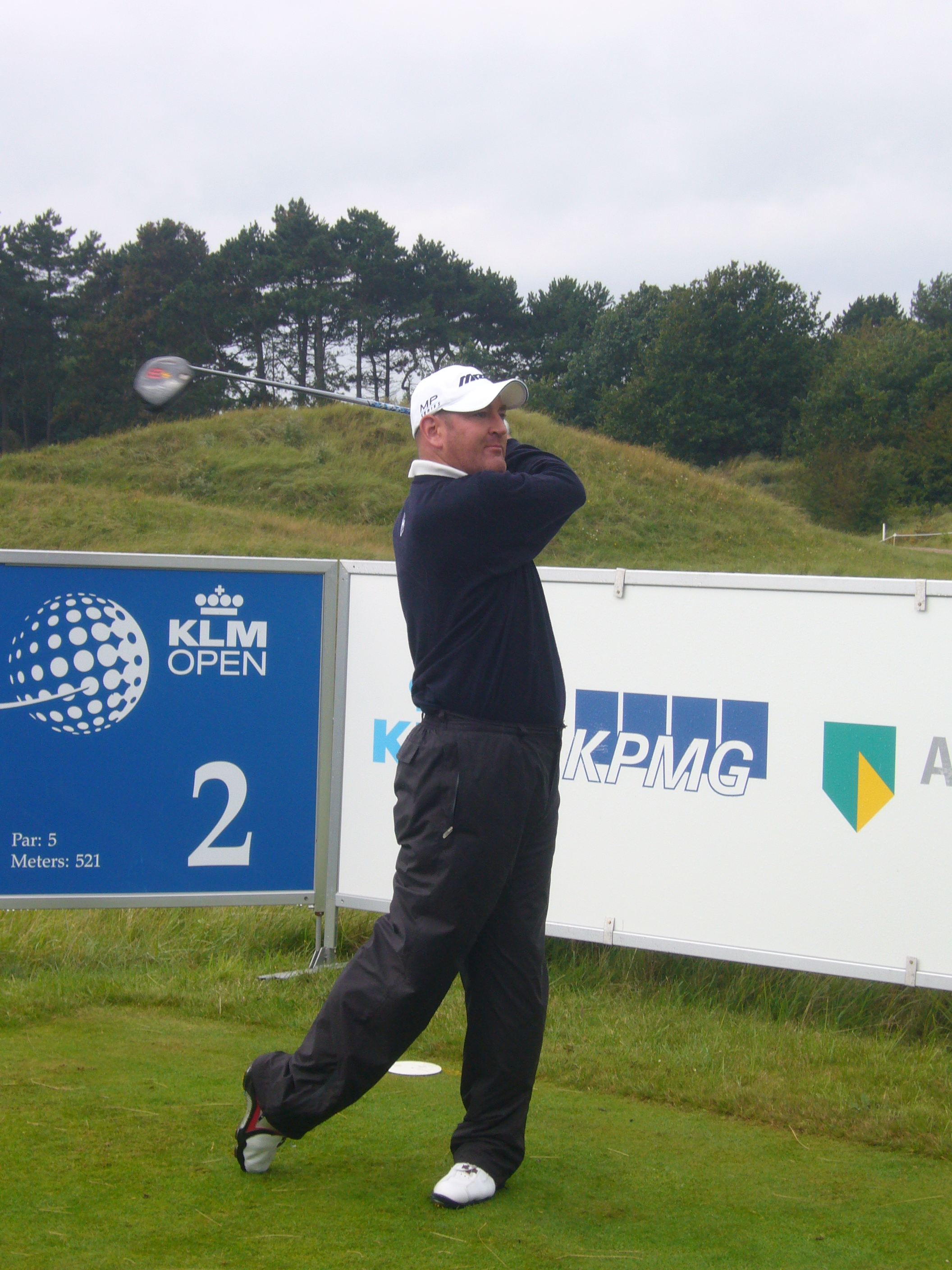

Personal information
- Full name: Lee Scott James
- Nationality: England
- Born: 27 January 1973 (age 53) Poole, England
- Height: 5 ft 8 in (1.73 m)
- Spouse: Dagmar (m. 2000)

Career
- Sport: Golf
- Turned professional: 1995
- Former tours: European Tour; Challenge Tour
- Professional wins: 10

Number of wins by tour
- Challenge Tour: 5 (Tied-8th all-time)
- Other: 5

Best results in major championships
- Masters Tournament: CUT: 1995
- PGA Championship: DNP
- U.S. Open: DNP
- The Open Championship: CUT: 1994

Achievements and awards
- Challenge Tour Rankings winner: 2002

Lee Scott James (born 27 January 1973) is an English former professional golfer.

== Early life and amateur career ==
James was born in Poole, Dorset. He won the 1994 Amateur Championship with a 2 & 1 victory over Gordon Sherry.

== Professional career ==
James turned professional in 1995 after the Walker Cup, where he was part of the victories Great Britain and Ireland team.

Having been unsuccessful at gaining a place on the European Tour via qualifying school, James began his professional career on the second tier Challenge Tour, picking up his first win at the 1996 Modena Classic Open. He finally graduated to the elite tour by finishing top of the 2002 Challenge Tour Rankings, with three wins during the season. He was unable to retain his tour card, and returned to the Challenge Tour in 2004.

16th place in the 2006 Challenge Tour Rankings followed by success at final qualifying school in 2007 gave James another two seasons at the top level, but both times he was unable to earn sufficient money to maintain his playing status. In 2009, he won his fifth Challenge Tour title at the Allianz Open Côtes d'Armor Bretagne.

== Reinstated amateur career ==
In 2016, James was reinstated as an amateur.

== Amateur wins ==
- 1994 The Amateur Championship

== Professional wins (10) ==
=== Challenge Tour wins (5) ===
No.	Date	Tournament	Winning score	Margin of victory	Runner-up
1	28 Sep 1996	Modena Classic Open	−6 (69-76-68-69=282)	1 stroke	(New Zealand) Marcus Wheelhouse
2	3 Mar 2002	Sameer Kenya Open	−19 (66-65-70-64=265)	3 strokes	(South Africa) Titch Moore
3	23 Jun 2002	Clearstream International Luxembourg Open	−24 (66-65-68-65=264)	3 strokes	(England) Mark Sanders
4	4 Aug 2002	Talma Finnish Challenge	−19 (64-67-70-68=269)	2 strokes	(England) Matthew Blackey
5	17 May 2009	Allianz Open Côtes d'Armor Bretagne	−6 (65-70-71-68=274)	Playoff	(Germany) Florian Fritsch

Challenge Tour playoff record (1–1)

No.	Year	Tournament	Opponent	Result
1	2006	Texbond Open	(Spain) Carlos del Moral	Lost to birdie on third extra hole
2	2009	Allianz Open Côtes d'Armor Bretagne	(Germany) Florian Fritsch	Won with birdie on first extra hole

=== MasterCard Tour wins (2) ===
- 1999 Celtic Manor Resort Championship, Hawkstone Park Championship

=== Other wins (3) ===
- 1996 Futures Tour Championship
- 1998 Futures Tour Championship, Northern Open

== Results in major championships ==
Tournament	1994	1995
Masters Tournament		CUT
The Open Championship	CUT	

Did not play

CUT = missed the half-way cut
Note: Phillips only played in The Open Championship.

== Team appearances ==
Amateur

- European Boys' Team Championship (representing England): 1991
- European Amateur Team Championship (representing England): 1993, 1995
- European Youths' Team Championship (representing England): 1994
- Eisenhower Trophy (representing Great Britain & Ireland): 1994
- St Andrews Trophy (representing Great Britain & Ireland): 1994 (winners)
- Walker Cup (representing Great Britain & Ireland): 1995 (winners)

== See also ==
- 2006 Challenge Tour graduates
- 2007 European Tour Qualifying School graduates
- List of golfers with most Challenge Tour wins
