= Sébastien Delagrange =

French professional golfer (born 1974)

Personal information
- Full name: Sébastien Delagrange
- Nationality: France
- Born: 6 February 1974 (age 52) Paris, France
- Height: 1.80 m (5 ft 11 in)
- Weight: 78 kg (172 lb; 12.3 st)

Career
- Sport: Golf
- Turned professional: 1995
- Former tours: European Tour; Challenge Tour
- Professional wins: 6

Number of wins by tour
- Challenge Tour: 2
- Other: 4

Sébastien Delagrange (born 6 February 1974) is a French professional golfer.

== Career ==
Delagrange was born in Paris. He turned professional in 1995 and has spent his career fluctuating between European Tour status and playing on the second tier Challenge Tour. In 2001, he won the Nykredit Danish Open and the Aa St Omer Open on the Challenge Tour.

== Professional wins (6) ==
=== Challenge Tour wins (2) ===
No.	Date	Tournament	Winning score	Margin of victory	Runner-up
1	27 May 2001	Aa St Omer Open	−20 (63-67-70-72=272)	1 stroke	(Wales) Jamie Donaldson
2	10 Jun 2001	Nykredit Danish Open	−2 (65-69-75-73=282)	2 strokes	(Sweden) Peter Malmgren

=== BeNeLux Golf Tour wins (1) ===
No.	Date	Tournament	Winning score	Margin of victory	Runners-up
1	10 May 2012	Deauville Pro-Am	−8 (66-70-70=206)	2 strokes	(France) Frédéric Dauchez, (France) Benoît Teilleria

=== Other wins (3) ===
- 1997 National Omnium (French Tour)
- 1998 Franche-Comté Open (French Tour)
- 2001 Mauritius Open

== Team appearances ==
Amateur

- Jacques Léglise Trophy (representing the Continent of Europe): 1992
- European Amateur Team Championship (representing France): 1993
- Eisenhower Trophy (representing France): 1992, 1994
