= Michael Jonzon =

Swedish professional golfer

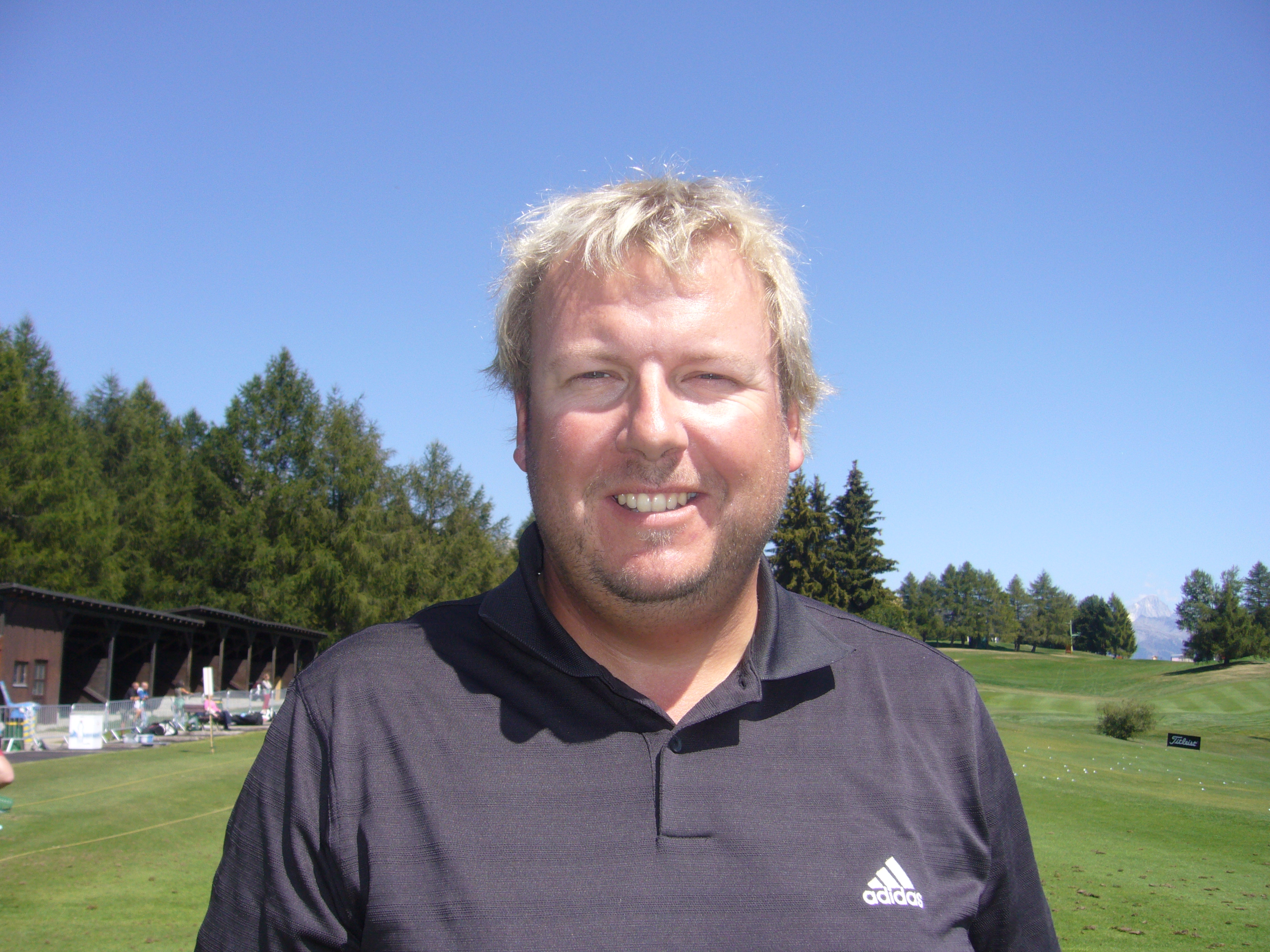
- Jonzon in 2009

Personal information
- Full name: Michael Jonzon
- Nationality: Sweden
- Born: 21 April 1972 (age 54) Skara, Sweden
- Height: 1.88 m (6 ft 2 in)

Career
- Sport: Golf
- Turned professional: 1991
- Current tour: European Senior Tour
- Former tour: European Tour
- Professional wins: 8

Number of wins by tour
- European Tour: 2
- Challenge Tour: 2
- Other: 4

Best results in major championships
- Masters Tournament: DNP
- PGA Championship: DNP
- U.S. Open: DNP
- The Open Championship: T60: 1996

Michael Jonzon (born 21 April 1972) is a Swedish professional golfer.

== Career ==
Jonzon was born in Skara, Sweden. He turned professional in 1991 and has spent most of his career on the European Tour and the Challenge Tour. He has two European Tour titles, the 1997 Portuguese Open and the 2009 Castelló Masters Costa Azahar, and several wins in lower level professional events.

== Professional wins (8) ==
=== European Tour wins (2) ===
No.	Date	Tournament	Winning score	Margin of victory	Runner(s)-up
1	16 Mar 1997	Portuguese Open	−19 (67-65-68-69=269)	3 strokes	(Spain) Ignacio Garrido
2	25 Oct 2009	Castelló Masters Costa Azahar	−20 (64-68-65-67=264)	1 stroke	(Germany) Martin Kaymer, (Sweden) Christian Nilsson

=== Challenge Tour wins (2) ===
No.	Date	Tournament	Winning score	Margin of victory	Runner(s)-up
1	29 Jun 2003	Galeria Kaufhof Pokal Challenge	−25 (63-63-69-68=263)	2 strokes	(England) Phillip Archer, (Sweden) Chris Hanell, (England) David Ryles
2	24 Aug 2003	Rolex Trophy	−21 (66-67-67-67=267)	3 strokes	(Austria) Martin Wiegele

=== Other wins (4) ===
- 1993 Sundvall Open (Swedish Mini-Tour)
- 1994 Kinnaborg Open (Swedish Mini-Tour)
- 1997 Open Novotel Perrier (with Anders Forsbrand)
- 2006 Rosén Open (Swedish Mini-Tour)

== Playoff record ==
European Senior Tour playoff record (0–1)

No.	Year	Tournament	Opponent	Result
1	2022	Farmfoods European Senior Masters	(Scotland) Paul Lawrie	Lost to birdie on first extra hole

== Results in major championships ==
Tournament	1996	1997	1998	1999	2000
The Open Championship	T60				CUT

Note: Jonzon only played in The Open Championship.

Did not play

CUT = missed the half-way cut
"T" = tied

== Results in World Golf Championships ==
Tournament	2009	2010
Match Play		
Championship		
Invitational		T78
Champions	T57	

Did not play

"T" = Tied

== See also ==
- 2012 European Tour Qualifying School graduates
