= Robert-Jan Derksen =

Dutch professional golfer (born 1974)

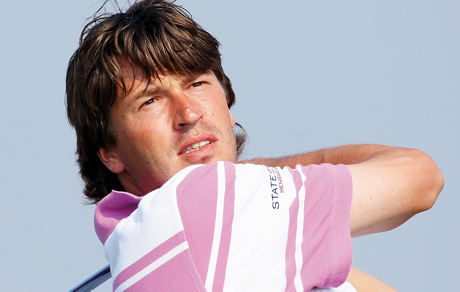

Personal information
- Nationality: Netherlands
- Born: 3 January 1974 (age 52) Nijmegen, Netherlands
- Height: 1.88 m (6 ft 2 in)
- Weight: 82 kg (181 lb; 12.9 st)

Career
- Sport: Golf
- Turned professional: 1996
- Former tours: European Tour; Asian Tour; Challenge Tour
- Professional wins: 2

Number of wins by tour
- European Tour: 2
- Challenge Tour: 1

Best results in major championships
- Masters Tournament: DNP
- PGA Championship: DNP
- U.S. Open: DNP
- The Open Championship: CUT: 2003

Robert-Jan Derksen (born 3 January 1974) is a Dutch professional golfer.

== Early life and amateur career ==
Derksen was born in Nijmegen. He won the Dutch Amateur Championship four years in a row from 1993 to 1996.

== Professional career ==
In 1996, Derksen turned professional. He began his professional career on the Asian Tour in 1997. At the end of the year, he returned to Europe and earned his European Tour card for the 1998 season via qualifying school. He initially struggled to maintain his place on the main tour and has returned to qualifying school on five occasions. He has not always been successful in regaining his card, dropping down to the second tier Challenge Tour twice, where he finished 8th on the end of season rankings in 2001. His first win on the European Tour came in 2003 at the prestigious Dubai Desert Classic. His only other title to date was the 2005 Madeira Island Open Caixa Geral de Depositos, a European and Challenge tour dual ranking event.

His best year-end ranking on the Order of Merit has been 36th in 2007.

In 2014 he said that he planned to retire at the end of the season.

== Amateur wins (5) ==
- 1993 Dutch Amateur Championship
- 1994 Dutch Amateur Championship
- 1995 Dutch Amateur Championship
- 1996 Dutch Amateur Championship, Dutch Amateur Stroke Play Championship

== Professional wins (2) ==
=== European Tour wins (2) ===
No.	Date	Tournament	Winning score	Margin of victory	Runner(s)-up
1	9 Mar 2003	Dubai Desert Classic	−17 (67-72-67-65=271)	1 stroke	(South Africa) Ernie Els
2	10 Apr 2005	Madeira Island Open Caixa Geral de Depositos^{1}	−13 (67-70-71-67=275)	2 strokes	(South Africa) Andrew McLardy, (Scotland) Gary Orr

^{1}Dual-ranking event with the Challenge Tour

=== Challenge Tour wins (1) ===
No.	Date	Tournament	Winning score	Margin of victory	Runners-up
1	10 Apr 2005	Madeira Island Open Caixa Geral de Depositos^{1}	−13 (67-70-71-67=275)	2 strokes	(South Africa) Andrew McLardy, (Scotland) Gary Orr

^{1}Dual-ranking event with the European Tour

== Results in major championships ==
Tournament	2003
The Open Championship	CUT

Note: Derksen only played in The Open Championship.
CUT = missed the half-way cut

== Results in World Golf Championships ==
Tournament	2003
Match Play	
Championship	
Invitational	T42

Did not play

"T" = Tied

== Team appearances ==
Amateur

- European Youths' Team Championship (representing the Netherlands): 1994
- Eisenhower Trophy (representing the Netherlands): 1994

Professional

- World Cup (representing the Netherlands): 2001, 2004, 2005, 2007, 2011, 2013
