= Nicolas Vanhootegem =

Belgian professional golfer (born 1972)

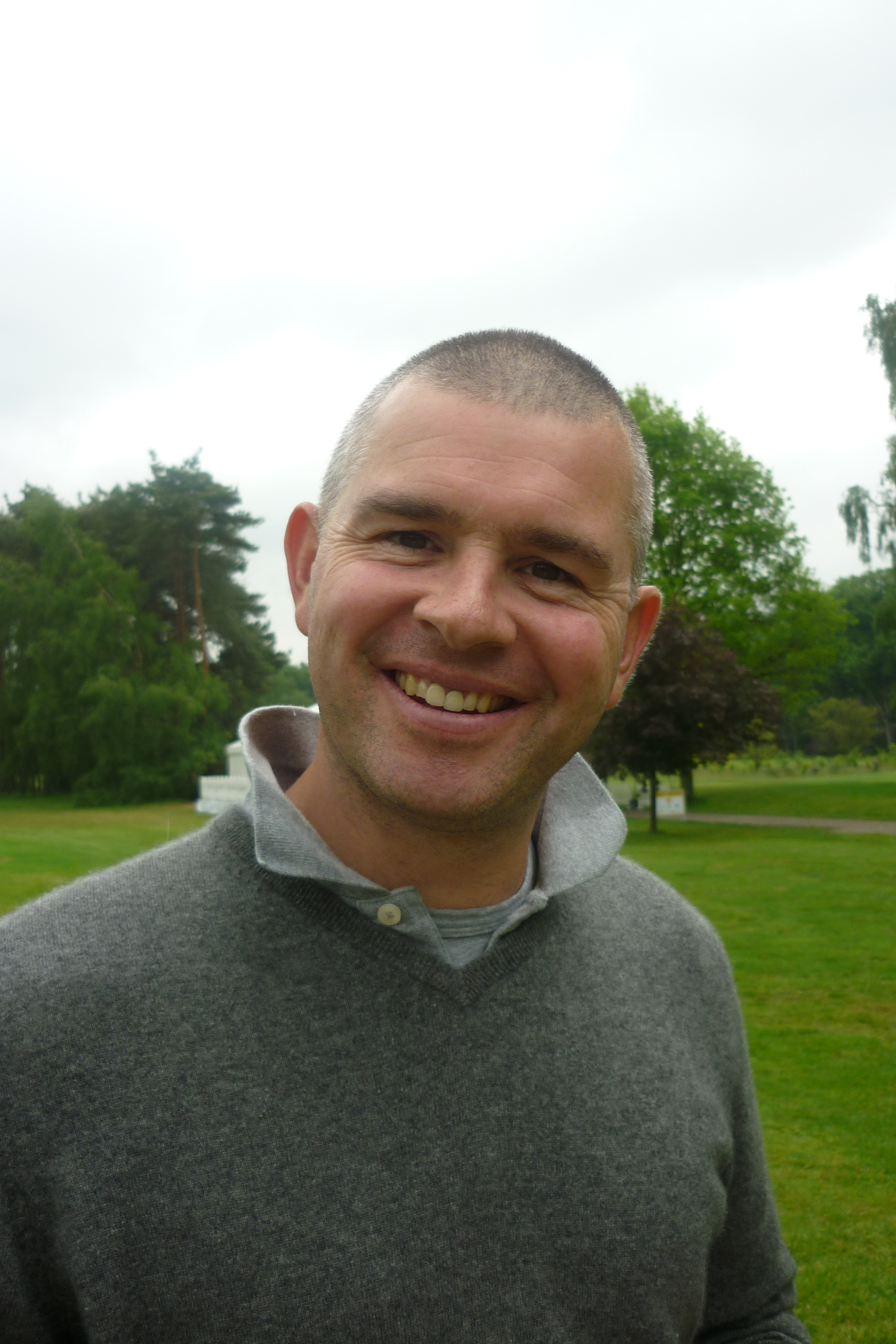

Personal information
- Full name: Nicolas Vanhootegem
- Nationality: Belgium
- Born: 7 October 1972 (age 54) Brussels, Belgium
- Height: 1.82 m (6 ft 0 in)
- Spouse: Agnès
- Children: 2

Career
- Sport: Golf
- Turned professional: 1994
- Former tours: European Tour; Challenge Tour
- Professional wins: 5

Number of wins by tour
- Challenge Tour: 3
- Other: 2

Best results in major championships
- Masters Tournament: DNP
- PGA Championship: DNP
- U.S. Open: DNP
- The Open Championship: T30: 2001

Nicolas Vanhootegem (born 7 October 1972) is a Belgian professional golfer.

== Early life and amateur career ==
In 1972, Vanhootegem was born in Brussels. He won several tree international tournaments as an amateur, including the Belgium international, the Luxembourg international and the Welsh Open Stroke Play.

== Professional career ==
In 1994, Vanhootegem turned professional. He has spent his career fluctuating between membership of the main European Tour and the second-tier Challenge Tour.

Vanhootegem has won three tournaments on the Challenge Tour, he lost in play off against Thomas Bjørn in his first Challenge Tour start in 1995 and in his second professional start, he won the Neuchâtel Open SBS Trophy. He also won the 2002 Aa St Omer Open and the 2007 Telenet Trophy, which was held in his home country. He also won the 1991, 1993 and 1997 Omnium of Belgium. He represented his country at the World Cup of Golf as an amateur player.

== Amateur wins ==
- 1991 Welsh Amateur Open Stroke Play Championship, Luxembourg Amateur Open Championship, Belgium International Championship, Omnium of Belgium
- 1991-93 Omnium of Belgium

== Professional wins ==
=== Challenge Tour wins (3) ===
No.	Date	Tournament	Winning score	Margin of victory	Runner(s)-up
1	2 Jul 1995	Neuchâtel Open SBS Trophy	−13 (66-66-68=200)	2 strokes	(Italy) Michele Reale
2	16 Jun 2002	Aa St Omer Open	−7 (75-70-67-65=277)	4 strokes	(England) Lee S. James, (Argentina) Gustavo Rojas
3	20 May 2007	Telenet Trophy	−17 (68-65-68-70=271)	4 strokes	(Chile) Felipe Aguilar

Challenge Tour playoff record (0–2)

No.	Year	Tournament	Opponents	Result
1	1995	Himmerland Open	(Denmark) Thomas Bjørn, (Finland) Anssi Kankkonen	Bjørn won with birdie on first extra hole
2	1997	Alianca UAP Challenger	(Finland) Anssi Kankkonen, (Sweden) Fredrik Lindgren	

=== BeNeLux Golf Tour wins (1) ===
No.	Date	Tournament	Winning score	Margin of victory	Runners-up
1	7 Sep 2012	Pro-Am de la Construction	−6 (69-69=138)	7 strokes	(Belgium) Alain Anthonissen, (Belgium) Gilles Monville

=== Other wins (1) ===
- 1997 Omnium of Belgium

== Results in major championships ==
Tournament	2001
The Open Championship	T30

"T" = tied
Note: Vanhootegem only played in The Open Championship.

== Team appearances ==
Amateur

- European Boys' Team Championship (representing Belgium): 1990
- European Amateur Team Championship (representing Belgium): 1991, 1993
- Eisenhower Trophy (representing Belgium): 1992, 1994
- St Andrews Trophy (representing the Continent of Europe): 1992, 1994
