= Albarella =

Albarella may refer to:

- Umberto Albarella, Italian-British archaeologist, prehistorian, and activist
- Albarella International Open, golf tournament on the Challenge Tour, played in Italy
- Albarella, an island in the Veneto region of Italy

== See also ==
- Albarelli
- Albarello (disambiguation)
