= 1996 Swedish Golf Tour =

Golf tour season

1996 Swedish Golf Tour season
- Duration: 16 May 1996 – 28 September 1996
- Number of official events: 14
- Order of Merit: (Sweden) Adam Mednick

The 1996 Swedish Golf Tour, titled as the 1996 Telia Infomedia Golf Tour for sponsorship reasons, was the 13th season of the Swedish Golf Tour, the main professional golf tour in Sweden since it was formed in 1984, with most tournaments being incorporated into the Challenge Tour between 1989 and 1998.

== Telia title sponsorship ==
In December 1995, it was announced that the tour had signed a title sponsorship agreement with Telia Company, being renamed as the Telia Infomedia Golf Tour.

== Schedule ==
The following table lists official events during the 1996 season.

Date	Tournament	Location	Purse (SKr)	Winner (Note: The number in brackets after each winner's name is the number of Swedish Golf Tour events they had won up to and including that tournament. As most Swedish Golf Tour events are incorporated into the Challenge Tour schedules, details of these wins are displayed there instead.)	Main tour (Note: CHA − Challenge Tour.)
18 May	Motoman Robotics Open	Småland	100,000	(Sweden) Daniel Olsson (1)	
25 May	Helsingborg Golf Open	Skåne	125,000	(Sweden) Peter Henriksson (1)	
2 Jun	SIAB Open	Skåne	£35,000	(Finland) Kalle Väinölä	CHA
9 Jun	Himmerland Open	Denmark	£35,000	(Sweden) Niklas Diethelm	CHA
16 Jun	Västerås Open	Västmanland	150,000	(Sweden) Johan Axgren (1)	
23 Jun	Team Erhverv Danish Open	Denmark	£70,000	(Sweden) Robert Jonsson	CHA
7 Jul	Uno-X Skövde Open	Västergötland	100,000	(Sweden) Martin Erlandsson (1)	
14 Jul	Volvo Finnish Open	Finland	£35,000	(Sweden) Björn Bäck	CHA
18 Aug	Gefle Open	Gästrikland	175,000	(Sweden) Chris Hanell (1)	
25 Aug	Toyota Danish PGA Championship	Denmark	£40,000	(Sweden) Adam Mednick	CHA
1 Sep	Kentab/RBG Open	Västmanland	£40,000	(Sweden) Max Anglert	CHA
8 Sep	SM Match Play	Småland	£50,000	(Sweden) Adam Mednick	CHA
14 Sep	Borås Open	Västergötland	150,000	(Sweden) Kristofer Svensson (1)	
28 Sep	Telia InfoMedia Grand Prix	Skåne	1,000,000	(England) Scott Watson	CHA

== Order of Merit ==
The Order of Merit was based on tournament results during the season, calculated using a points-based system.

Position	Player	Points
1	(Sweden) Adam Mednick	2,325
2	(Sweden) Johan Axgren	1,241
3	(Sweden) Robert Jonsson	1,142
4	(Sweden) Patrik Gottfridsson	963
5	(Sweden) Björn Bäck	927

== See also ==
- 1996 Swedish Golf Tour (women)
