= Albarello (disambiguation) =

An albarello is a type of maiolica earthenware jar.

Albarello may also refer to:

- Albarello (grape), a red wine grape variety
- Albarello (surname), Italian surname

== See also ==
- Albarella (disambiguation)
- Albarelli
