= Markus Brier =

Austrian golfer (born 1968)

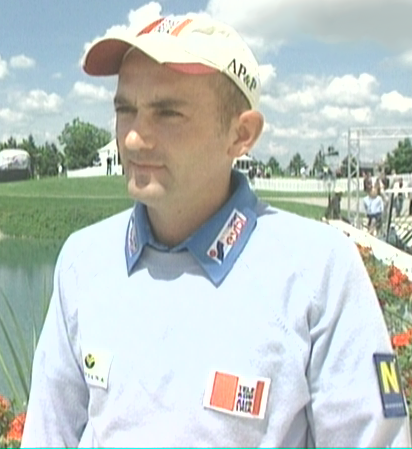

Personal information
- Nationality: Austria
- Born: 5 July 1968 (age 58) Vienna, Austria
- Height: 1.78 m (5 ft 10 in)

Career
- Sport: Golf
- Turned professional: 1995
- Current tour: European Senior Tour
- Former tours: European Tour; Challenge Tour; Alps Tour
- Professional wins: 10
- Highest ranking: 91 (26 August 2007)

Number of wins by tour
- European Tour: 2
- Asian Tour: 1
- Challenge Tour: 2
- European Senior Tour: 2
- Other: 4

Best results in major championships
- Masters Tournament: DNP
- PGA Championship: CUT: 2007
- U.S. Open: DNP
- The Open Championship: T12: 2007

Markus Brier (born 5 July 1968) is an Austrian professional golfer. He won twice on the European Tour and in 2008 was his country's second highest ranked player, behind Bernd Wiesberger.

== Career ==
Brier won the Swiss and German Amateur Opens in the mid-1990s, and turned professional in 1995 at a relatively late age. Nine top ten finishes, including five top threes, on the 1999 Challenge Tour earned him third place on the season ending money list and playing privileges on the European Tour for 2000. He retained his tour card through his final position on the order of merit every year, except for 2002 and 2010 when he regained it through final qualifying school.

Since joining the European Tour, Brier has continued to play in his home event, the Austrian Open, winning it on two occasions during a period when it was a Challenge Tour event. In 2006 the tournament was promoted back onto the main European Tour schedule, now under the sponsored title BA-CA Golf Open. In its first year back, Brier once again took the title, in the process becoming the first Austrian golfer to win a European Tour event. This win helped him to his then best year-end finish on the Order of Merit of 49th.

Brier's second European Tour win came in 2007 at the Volvo China Open and he improved his position on the year end Order of Merit to 32nd. He has also featured in the top 100 of the Official World Golf Rankings.

In 2012, Brier failed to regain his card at qualifying school. He failed to do so again in 2016 at age 48. He was the oldest competitor during 2016 Q School. Had he placed high enough, he would have been the oldest player to graduate to the European Tour via Q School.

== Amateur wins ==
- 1994 Swiss Amateur Open Championship
- 1995 German Amateur Open Championship

== Professional wins (10) ==
=== European Tour wins (2) ===
No.	Date	Tournament	Winning score	Margin of victory	Runner(s)-up
1	11 Jun 2006	BA-CA Golf Open	−18 (65-67-66-68=266)	3 strokes	(Denmark) Søren Hansen
2	15 Apr 2007	Volvo China Open^{1}	−10 (72-68-67-67=274)	5 strokes	(Australia) Scott Hend, (Northern Ireland) Graeme McDowell, (South Africa) Andrew McLardy

^{1}Co-sanctioned by the Asian Tour

European Tour playoff record (0–1)

No.	Year	Tournament	Opponent	Result
1	2007	Telecom Italia Open	(Spain) Gonzalo Fernández-Castaño	Lost to birdie on second extra hole

=== Challenge Tour wins (2) ===
No.	Date	Tournament	Winning score	Margin of victory	Runner(s)-up
1	2 Jun 2002	Austrian Golf Open	−21 (67-67-62-71=267)	1 stroke	(Germany) Gary Birch Jr.
2	5 Sep 2004	BA-CA Golf Open (2)	−23 (65-63-66-67=261)	8 strokes	(Finland) Roope Kakko, (England) Lee Slattery

Challenge Tour playoff record (0–1)

No.	Year	Tournament	Opponent	Result
1	2008	MAN NÖ Open	(Switzerland) André Bossert	Lost to par on first extra hole

=== Alps Tour wins (3) ===
No.	Date	Tournament	Winning score	Margin of victory	Runner(s)-up
1	15 Sep 2001	Steigenberger Open	−14 (67-66-72=205)	Playoff	(Austria) Ulf Wendling
2	20 Aug 2005	MAN NÖ Open	−6 (71-69-64=204) (Note: Shortened to 54 holes due to weather.)	1 stroke	(Spain) Francisco Valera
3	14 May 2022	Gösser Open	−17 (67-66-66=199)	1 stroke	(United States) Clark Dennis, (Austria) Lukas Lipold, (Italy) Andrea Saracino

=== Other wins (1) ===
No.	Date	Tournament	Winning score	Margin of victory	Runner-up
1	20 Aug 2013	Zurich Open	−8 (68-68=136)	1 stroke	(Spain) Javier Colomo

=== European Senior Tour wins (2) ===
No.	Date	Tournament	Winning score	Margin of victory	Runner-up
1	3 Oct 2021	Farmfoods European Senior Masters	−5 (70-66-75=211)	2 strokes	(Argentina) Ricardo González
2	31 Aug 2025	Black Desert NI Legends	−12 (65-69-70=204)	2 strokes	(Sweden) Mikael Lundberg

European Senior Tour playoff record (0–1)

No.	Year	Tournament	Opponent	Result
1	2021	Scottish Senior Open	(France) Thomas Levet	Lost to par on first extra hole

== Results in major championships ==
Tournament	2001	2002	2003	2004	2005	2006	2007	2008	2009	2010	2011
The Open Championship	CUT		T46			CUT	T12		CUT		CUT
PGA Championship							CUT				

Did not play

CUT = missed the half-way cut
"T" = tied
Note: Brier never played in the Masters Tournament or the U.S. Open.

== Results in senior major championships ==
Results not in chronological order

Tournament	2018	2019	2020	2021	2022	2023	2024	2025	2026
Senior PGA Championship		CUT	NT	T40	CUT	CUT			CUT
The Tradition			NT						
U.S. Senior Open			NT	T40	T25				
Senior Players Championship									
Senior British Open Championship	T32	CUT	NT	CUT	T53	CUT	T29	CUT	T26

Did not play

"T" indicates a tie for a place
CUT = missed the halfway cut
NT = no tournament due to COVID-19 pandemic

== Team appearances ==
Amateur

- European Boys' Team Championship (representing Austria): 1985
- European Amateur Team Championship (representing Austria): 1991, 1993
- Eisenhower Trophy (representing Austria): 1988, 1990, 1992, 1994

Professional

- World Cup (representing Austria): 2004, 2007
- Seve Trophy (representing Continental Europe): 2007

== See also ==
- 2010 European Tour Qualifying School graduates
