= Massimo Florioli =

Italian professional golfer (born 1972)

Personal information
- Nationality: Italy
- Born: 14 February 1972 (age 54)
- Height: 1.80 m (5 ft 11 in)
- Weight: 85 kg (187 lb; 13.4 st)

Career
- Sport: Golf
- Turned professional: 1991
- Former tours: European Tour; Challenge Tour
- Professional wins: 4

Number of wins by tour
- Challenge Tour: 1
- Other: 3

Best results in major championships
- Masters Tournament: DNP
- PGA Championship: DNP
- U.S. Open: DNP
- The Open Championship: CUT: 1996
Medal record
Mediterranean Games
Gold medal – first place	1991 Athens	Men's team

Massimo Florioli (born 14 February 1972) is an Italian professional golfer. He represented Italy in the 1997 and 1998 World Cup. In the 1998 tournament Florioli and his teammate, Costantino Rocca, finished second, two strokes behind England, recording the best performance by an Italian pair in the event at that time.

Florioli played on the European Tour from 1997 to 2001. He didn't win a European Tour event but was second in the 1998 Peugeot Open de France and the 1999 Estoril Open. He was joint third in the 1998 Benson & Hedges International Open winning €59,108.

== Professional wins (4) ==
=== Challenge Tour wins (1) ===
No.	Date	Tournament	Winning score	Margin of victory	Runner-up
1	10 Mar 1996	Open de Côte d'Ivoire	−4 (70-72-72-70=284)	4 strokes	(Italy) Michele Reale

=== Other wins (3) ===
- 1990 Spanish Junior Championship Professional
- 1993 Italian PGA Championship
- 1994 Italian PGA Championship
- 1997 Italian National Open

== Team appearances ==
Amateur

- Jacques Léglise Trophy (representing the Continent of Europe): 1989
- European Youths' Team Championship (representing Italy): 1990 (winners)
- Eisenhower Trophy (representing Italy): 1990
- European Amateur Team Championship (representing Italy): 1991

Professional

- World Cup (representing Italy): 1997, 1998
