= Ivory Coast Open =

Golf tournament

Tournament information
- Location: Ivory Coast
- Established: 1980
- Course: Ivoire Golf Club
- Par: 72
- Tours: Challenge Tour; Safari Circuit
- Format: Stroke play
- Prize fund: €70,000
- Month played: April
- Final year: 1999

Tournament record score
- Aggregate: 265 Gary Player (1980)
- To par: −23 as above

Final champion
- (England) Ian Poulter
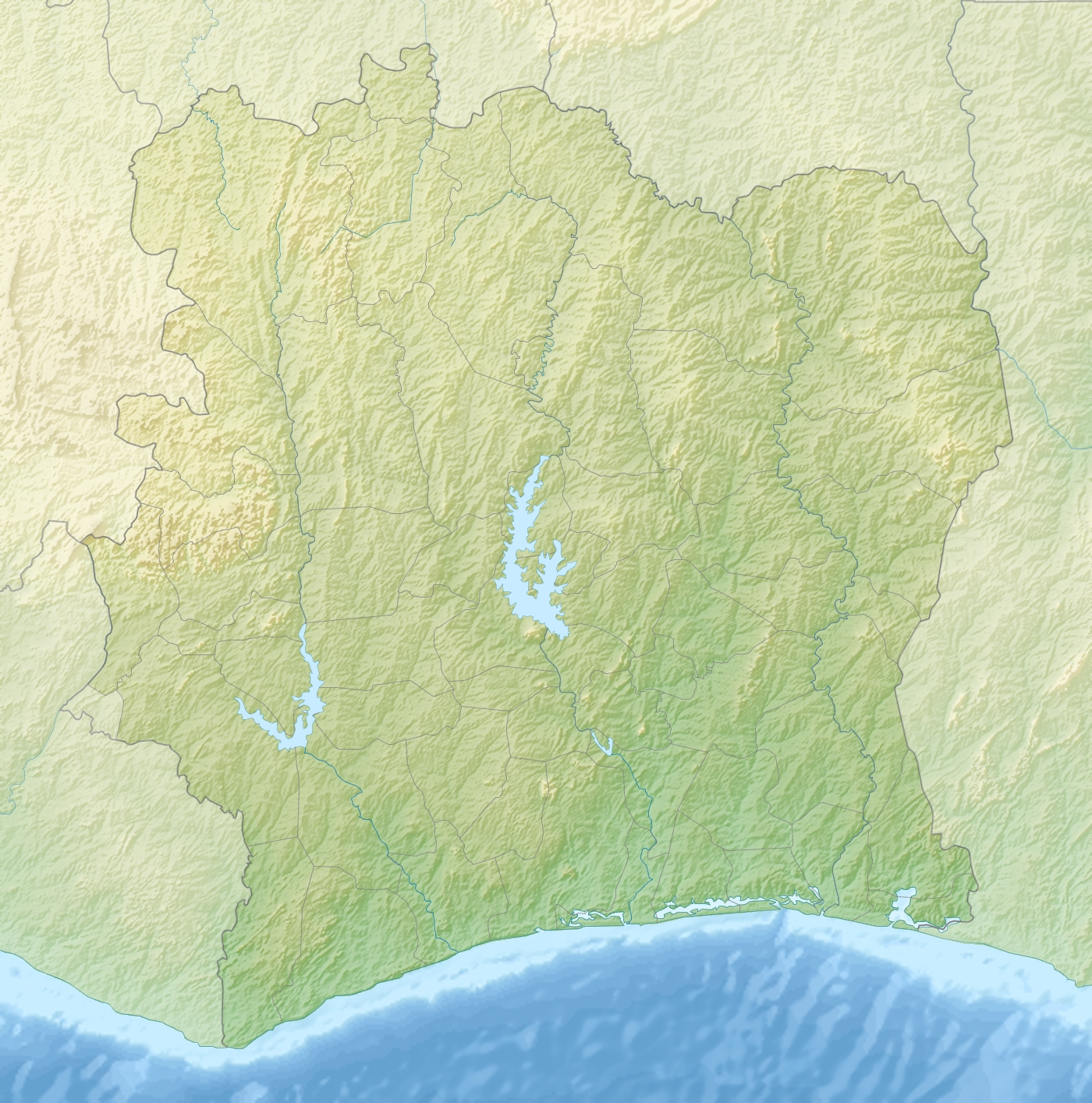
- Location in Ivory Coast

The Ivory Coast Open or Open de Côte d'Ivoire was a golf tournament in the Ivory Coast. It was founded in 1980, and was an event on the Safari Circuit the following year. It was an event on the European-based Challenge Tour schedule in 1990 and 1991, and from 1996 to 1999. It has been held at President Golf Club, Yamoussoukro and Ivoire Golf Club, Abidjan.

The title has been won by some of the world's top golfers, including Vijay Singh, Ian Poulter, and Gary Player. The most successful player is England's Gordon J. Brand, who recorded three victories between 1981 and 1988.

The tournament was revived in 2017 after an 18-year hiatus and was won by the Ghanaian golfer Vincent Torgah.

== History ==
The first event in 1980 was to inaugurate the President Golf Club, Yamoussoukro. It was an invitation event with 27 professionals competing. Yamoussoukro was the birthplace of the President, Félix Houphouët-Boigny, who attended the event. Gary Player and Peter Townsend tied at 265, 23 under par and nine strokes ahead of the rest of the field. Townsend was bunkered on the first playoff hole and took a bogey 5 to Player's par 4.

In 1981 the event became the Ivory Coast Open and was added to the Safari Circuit schedule. It was won by Gordon J. Brand, who beat Martin Poxon at the first hole of a sudden-death playoff, after the two had tied on 271.

== Winners ==
This list is incomplete. The 1999 event was advertised as the 18th edition.

Year	Tour (Note: CHA − Challenge Tour; SAF − Safari Circuit.)	Winner	Score	To par	Margin of victory	Runner(s)-up	Venue	Ref.
Open de Côte d'Ivoire
1999	CHA	(England) Ian Poulter	284	−4	2 strokes	(France) Sébastien Delagrange (Wales) David Park (France) Marc Pendariès	Ivoire	
1998	CHA	(England) John Mellor	281	−7	3 strokes	(Sweden) Fredrik Lindgren (Spain) José Antonio Sota	Ivoire	
1997	CHA	(Denmark) Knud Storgaard	274	−14	Playoff	(Finland) Anssi Kankkonen	President	
1996	CHA	(Italy) Massimo Florioli	284	−4	4 strokes	(Italy) Michele Reale	Ivoire	
1992−1995: No tournament.
Ivory Coast Open
1991	CHA	(France) Michel Besanceney	279	−9	Playoff	(England) Paul Carman	President	
1990	CHA	(Wales) David Llewellyn (2)	275	−13	2 strokes	(England) Jeff Pinsent	President	
1989	SAF	(Fiji) Vijay Singh	274	−14	1 stroke	(England) Jeff Pinsent	President	
1988	SAF	(England) Gordon J. Brand (3)	275	−13	2 strokes	(England) Richard Fish	President	
1987		(France) Jean Garaïalde					President	
1986	SAF	(England) Gordon J. Brand (2)	273	−15	2 strokes	(Scotland) Brian Marchbank	President	
1985	SAF	(Wales) David Llewellyn	277	−11	1 stroke	(Scotland) Brian Gunson	President	
1984	SAF	(Scotland) Bill McColl	275	−13	5 strokes	(England) Gordon J. Brand (Scotland) Craig Maltman	President	
1983	SAF	(Scotland) Bill Longmuir	271	−17	1 stroke	(United States) Curtis Strange	President	
1982	SAF	(England) John Morgan	272	−16	2 strokes	(Wales) Ian Woosnam	President	
1981	SAF	(England) Gordon J. Brand	271	−17	Playoff	(England) Martin Poxon	President	
Trophée Félix Houphouët-Boigny
1980	SAF	(South Africa) Gary Player	265	−23	Playoff	(England) Peter Townsend	President	

== See also ==
- Open golf tournament
