= 1997 Swedish Golf Tour =

Golf tour season

1997 Swedish Golf Tour season
- Duration: 8 May 1997 – 5 October 1997
- Number of official events: 16
- Order of Merit: (Sweden) Fredrik Henge

The 1997 Swedish Golf Tour, titled as the 1997 Telia Infomedia Golf Tour for sponsorship reasons, was the 14th season of the Swedish Golf Tour, the main professional golf tour in Sweden since it was formed in 1984, with most tournaments being incorporated into the Challenge Tour between 1989 and 1998.

== Schedule ==
The following table lists official events during the 1997 season.

Date	Tournament	Location	Purse (SKr)	Winner (Note: The number in brackets after each winner's name is the number of Swedish Golf Tour events they had won up to and including that tournament. As most Swedish Golf Tour events are incorporated into the Challenge Tour schedules, details of these wins are displayed there instead.)	Main tour (Note: CHA − Challenge Tour.)
10 May	Motoman Robotics Open	Småland	150,000	(Sweden) Johan Ryström (5)	
24 May	Borås Open	Västergötland	150,000	(Finland) Mikko Rantanen (1)	
1 Jun	Himmerland Open	Denmark	£35,000	(Sweden) Mikael Lundberg	CHA
8 Jun	SIAB Open	Skåne	£35,000	(Sweden) Joakim Rask	CHA
15 Jun	Husqvarna Open	Småland	210,000	(Sweden) Mikael Lundberg (1)	
22 Jun	Team Erhverv Danish Open	Denmark	£80,000	(England) David Lynn	CHA
6 Jul	Uno-X Skövde Open	Västergötland	150,000	(Sweden) Ola Eliasson (1)	
13 Jul	Volvo Finnish Open	Finland	£35,000	(Denmark) Søren Kjeldsen	CHA
3 Aug	Gardemoen PGA Open	Norway	150,000	(Sweden) Joakim Kroon (1)	
10 Aug	Västerås Open	Västmanland	150,000	(Sweden) Peter Hanson (a) (1)	
24 Aug	Finnair Audi Open	Finland	250,000	(Sweden) David Lindqvist (1)	
31 Aug	Toyota Danish PGA Championship	Denmark	£40,000	(Sweden) Fredrik Henge	CHA
8 Sep	Öhrlings Swedish Matchplay	Halland	£50,000	(United States) Gregory Garbero	CHA
14 Sep	Tor Line Open	Halland	200,000	(Sweden) Fredrik Forsvall (1)	
21 Sep	Helsingborg Golf Open	Skåne	150,000	(Sweden) Mikael Krantz (2)	
5 Oct	Telia InfoMedia Grand Prix	Skåne	£80,000	(Sweden) Fredrik Henge	CHA

== Order of Merit ==
The Order of Merit was based on tournament results during the season, calculated using a points-based system.

Position	Player	Points
1	(Sweden) Fredrik Henge	2,021
2	(Sweden) Mikael Lundberg	1,416
3	(Sweden) Johan Ryström	944
4	(Sweden) Kalle Brink	870
5	(Sweden) Ola Eliasson	838

== See also ==
- 1997 Swedish Golf Tour (women)
