= Fredrik Lindgren (golfer) =

Swedish professional golfer (born 1966)

Personal information
- Nationality: Sweden
- Born: 28 March 1966 (age 60) Malmö, Sweden
- Height: 1.72 m (5 ft 8 in)
- Weight: 72 kg (159 lb; 11.3 st)

Career
- Sport: Golf
- Turned professional: 1989
- Former tours: European Tour; Challenge Tour
- Professional wins: 2

Number of wins by tour
- Challenge Tour: 2

Best results in major championships
- Masters Tournament: DNP
- PGA Championship: DNP
- U.S. Open: DNP
- The Open Championship: CUT: 1991, 1994

Fredrik Lindgren (born 28 March 1966) is a Swedish professional golfer who played on the European Tour. He was runner-up at the 1992 English Open at The Belfry.

== Amateur career ==
Lindgren was born 1966 in Malmö and represented Falsterbo Golf Club throughout his career.

Lindgren was on the National Team and won silver in 1982 and gold in 1983 at the European Boys' Team Championship, with a team that included Per-Ulrik Johansson. He earned a bronze alongside Jesper Parnevik and Johan Ryström at the 1984 European Youths' Team Championship, held at Hermitage GC in Ireland.

He was tapped to represent the Continent of Europe against Great Britain & Ireland, first at the 1983 Jacques Léglise Trophy at Glenbervie Golf Club in Scotland. He also played in the 1984 St Andrews Trophy alongside José María Olazábal, and in the 1988 edition held at the Old Course at St Andrews, Scotland.

Lindgren played in the 1988 Eisenhower Trophy, held on home soil at Ullna Golf Club near Stockholm, where his team with Anders Haglund, Cristian Härdin and John Lindberg finished 4th and he tied for 8th individually.

In 1987, he won the French Open Amateur Championship at Golf Club de Nimes Campagne, winning the final against Éric Giraud 4 and 3.

== Professional career ==
Lindgren turned professional in 1989 and joined the Challenge Tour, where he won the 1990 Scandinavian Tipo Trophy and earned promotion to the European Tour.

He played in 202 events on the European Tour between 1991 and 2000, where his best performance was finishing runner-up at the 1992 Murphy's English Open at The Belfry. He also finished in third place at the 1994 Italian Open held at Marco Simone Golf and Country Club.

Lindgren finished runner-up at the 1997 Alianca UAP Challenger in Portugal and the 1998 Open de Cote d'Ivoire, before securing a second Challenge Tour victory at the 1998 Albarella International Open in Venice, Italy.

After retiring from the tour, Lindgren became head of the ETPI, The European Tour Performance Institute, which combines golf coaching and sports science in order to optimize golfer's capabilities.

== Amateur wins ==
- 1987 French Open Amateur Championship (Trophée Gordon Bennett)

== Professional wins (2) ==
=== Challenge Tour wins (2) ===
| No. | Date | Tournament | Winning score | Margin of victory | Runner(s)-up |
|---|---|---|---|---|---|
| 1 | 15 Jul 1990 | Scandinavian Tipo Trophy | −1 (72-71-72=215) | Playoff | (Sweden) Mats Sterner |
| 2 | 16 May 1998 | Albarella International Open | −21 (69-66-66-66=267) | 3 strokes | (Australia) Mathew Goggin, (Argentina) Ricardo González |

Challenge Tour playoff record (1–1)

| No. | Year | Tournament | Opponent(s) | Result |
|---|---|---|---|---|
| 1 | 1990 | Scandinavian Tipo Trophy | (Sweden) Mats Sterner | Won with par on third extra hole |
| 2 | 1997 | Alianca UAP Challenger | (Finland) Anssi Kankkonen, (Belgium) Nicolas Vanhootegem | |

== Team appearances ==
Amateur

- European Boys' Team Championship (representing Sweden): 1982, 1983 (winners)
- European Youths' Team Championship (representing Sweden): 1984
- Jacques Léglise Trophy (representing the Continent of Europe): 1983
- St Andrews Trophy (representing the Continent of Europe): 1984, 1988
- European Amateur Team Championship (representing Sweden): 1987
- Eisenhower Trophy (representing Sweden): 1988
