= Knud Storgaard =

Danish professional golfer (born 1972)

Personal information
- Full name: Knud Storgaard Jensen
- Nationality: Denmark
- Born: 10 August 1972 (age 54) Skive, Denmark
- Height: 1.76 m (5 ft 9 in)
- Weight: 66 kg (146 lb; 10.4 st)

Career
- Sport: Golf
- College: Aarhus University
- Turned professional: 1996
- Former tours: European Tour; Challenge Tour; Nordic Golf League
- Professional wins: 5

Number of wins by tour
- Challenge Tour: 1
- Other: 4

Knud Storgaard Jensen (born 10 August 1972) is a Danish professional golfer.

== Career ==
Storgaard, who holds a master's degree in nuclear physics, first qualified for the European Tour in 1998 having won once on the Challenge Tour the previous year. His first season was unsuccessful, but he again qualified for the 2003 European Tour season; unfortunately at the same time it was discovered that he was suffering from testicular cancer. Because of the cancer, Storgaard didn't participate in the European Tour season, and as a result he got a medical extension for the 2004 European Tour season.

== Amateur wins ==
- 1993 Danish National Amateur Championship

== Professional wins (5) ==
=== Challenge Tour wins (1) ===
No.	Date	Tournament	Winning score	Margin of victory	Runner-up
1	8 Mar 1997	Open de Côte d'Ivoire	−14 (70-69-68-67=274)	Playoff	(Finland) Anssi Kankkonen

Challenge Tour playoff record (1–1)

No.	Year	Tournament	Opponent	Result
1	1996	Himmerland Open	(Sweden) Niklas Diethelm	Lost to birdie on first extra hole
2	1997	Open de Côte d'Ivoire	(Finland) Anssi Kankkonen	

=== Nordic Golf League wins (4) ===
No.	Date	Tournament	Winning score	Margin of victory	Runner(s)-up
1	15 May 2005	Wavin Open	−11 (69-74-65=208)	Playoff	(Finland) Panu Kylliäinen
2	19 Aug 2007	Weber Masters	−8 (68-72-68=208)	3 strokes	(Sweden) Gustav Adell
3	16 Oct 2010	Backtee Race to HimmerLand	−15 (67-65-69=201)	3 strokes	(Austria) HP Bacher, (Sweden) Marcus Palm
4	13 May 2011	Samsø Classic	−11 (66-68-71=205)	Playoff	(Sweden) Andreas Högberg

== Team appearances ==
Professional

- World Cup (representing Denmark): 1997
