= 1997 World Cup of Golf =

Coordinates: 32°36′34″N 80°05′52″W

Tournament information
- Dates: 20–23 November
- Location: Kiawah Island, South Carolina, U.S.
- Courses: Kiawah Island Golf Resort; Ocean Course
- Format: 72 holes stroke play combined score

Statistics
- Par: 72
- Field: 32 two-man teams
- Cut: None
- Prize fund: US$1,300,000 team US$200,000 individual
- Winner's share: US$400,000 team US$100,000 individual

Champion
- Ireland; Pádraig Harrington & Paul McGinley
- 545 (−31)

The 1997 World Cup of Golf took place 20–23 November at the Kiawah Island Golf Resort, Ocean Course in Kiawah Island, South Carolina, U.S. It was the 43rd World Cup. The tournament was a 72-hole stroke play team event (32 teams) with each team consisting of two players from a country. The combined score of each team determined the team results. Individuals also competed for the International Trophy. The prize money totaled $1,500,000 with $400,000 going to the winning pair and $100,000 to the top individual. The Irish team of Pádraig Harrington and Paul McGinley won by five strokes over the Scottish team of Colin Montgomerie and Raymond Russell. Colin Montgomerie took the International Trophy by two strokes over Alex Čejka.

== Teams ==
Country	Players
Argentina	Jorge Berendt and José Cóceres
Australia	Bradley Hughes and Wayne Riley
Austria	Claude Grenier and Gordon Manson
Canada	Rick Gibson and Mike Weir
Chinese Taipei	Chou Hung-Nan and Hsu Huang-Lung
Colombia	Jesús Amaya and Gustavo Mendoza
Denmark	Thomas Bjørn and Knud Storgaard
England	Paul Broadhurst and Mark James
Finland	Anssi Kankkonen and Mika Lehtinen
France	Marc Farry and Jean van de Velde
Germany	Alex Čejka and Sven Strüver
India	Gaurav Ghei and Arjun Singh
Ireland	Pádraig Harrington and Paul McGinley
Italy	Massimo Florioli and Silvio Grappasonni
Japan	Hiroyuki Fujita and Taichi Teshima
Malaysia	Ali Kadir and Marimuthu Ramayah
Mexico	Rafael Alarcón and Óscar Serna
Namibia	Trevor Dodds and Schalk van der Merwe
New Zealand	Michael Long and Grant Waite
Norway	Morten Hagen and Morten Orveland
Paraguay	Felix Ramon Franco and Raúl Fretes
Philippines	Danilo Cabajar and Felix Casas
Puerto Rico	Michael Ambriz and Miguel Suárez
Scotland	Colin Montgomerie and Raymond Russell
South Africa	Ernie Els and Wayne Westner
South Korea	K. J. Choi and Park No-Seok
Spain	Ignacio Garrido and Miguel Ángel Martín
Sweden	Joakim Haeggman and Per-Ulrik Johansson
Switzerland	Juan Ciola and Paolo Quirici
United States	Justin Leonard and Davis Love III
Wales	Phillip Price and Ian Woosnam
Zimbabwe	Tony Johnstone and Mark McNulty

== Scores ==
Team

Place	Country	Score	To par	Money (US$) (per team)
1	Ireland	137-137-136-135=545	−31	400,000
2	Scotland	134-138-140-138=550	−26	200,000
3	United States	137-138-141-135=551	−25	125,000
T4	Germany	133-143-132-146=554	−22	90,000
T4	Wales	146-140-138-130=554	−22	90,000
6	Spain	135-141-140-139=555	−21	60,000
7	England	136-147-138-138=559	−17	45,000
8	Zimbabwe	141-141-143-136=561	−15	32,000
T9	New Zealand	139-145-136-142=562	−14	26,000
T9	South Africa	141-139-141-141=562	−14	26,000
11	Canada	139-142-145-137=563	−13	20,000
12	Mexico	138-152-135-145=570	−6	17,000
T13	Argentina	143-143-143-142=571	−5	13,000
T13	Denmark	140-152-139-140=571	−5	13,000
T13	Malaysia	137-145-143-146=571	−5	13,000
T16	Japan	142-148-143-139=572	−4	9,500
T16	Puerto Rico	146-144-143-139=572	−4	9,500
18	South Korea	140-145-142-146=573	−3	8,800
T19	Australia	139-143-144-151=577	+1	8,500
T19	France	140-140-147-150=577	+1	8,500
21	Colombia	143-139-147-149=578	+2	8,200
22	Switzerland	148-145-137-149=579	+3	8,000
T23	India	146-150-147-142=585	+9	7,700
T23	Italy	155-149-138-143=585	+9	7,700
25	Namibia	141-149-153-144=587	+11	7,400
26	Philippines	146-148-145-150=589	+13	7,200
27	Paraguay	144-155-148-145=592	+16	7,000
28	Norway	151-157-145-142=595	+19	6,800
29	Austria	147-155-149-149=600	+24	6,600
30	Chinese Taipei	152-151-147-157=607	+31	6,400
31	Finland	147-155-161-153=616	+40	6,200
32	Sweden	130-144-141-WD=WD		6,000

Sweden withdrew before the final round. Per-Ulrik Johansson had collapsed after the first round and then suffered another dizzy spell after the third round. Sweden were fourth after three rounds. Joakim Haeggman continued to compete in the individual competition.

International Trophy

Place	Player	Country	Score	To par	Money (US$)
1	Colin Montgomerie	Scotland	68-66-66-66=266	−22	100,000
2	Alex Čejka	Germany	63-68-65-72=268	−20	50,000
3	Ignacio Garrido	Spain	67-67-69-67=270	−18	25,000
4	Paul McGinley	Ireland	66-70-68-68=272	−16	15,000
T5	Pádraig Harrington	Ireland	71-67-68-67=273	−15	5,000
T5	Davis Love III	United States	65-69-74-65=273	−15	5,000
T7	Thomas Bjørn	Denmark	69-72-67-67=275	−13	
T7	Phillip Price	Wales	72-68-69-66=275	−13	
9	Grant Waite	New Zealand	70-70-69-67=276	−12	
T10	José Cóceres	Argentina	72-69-69-67=277	−11	
T10	Mark James	England	68-73-70-66-277	−11	
