= Adam Mednick =

Swedish professional golfer

Personal information
- Full name: Adam Rolfe Mednickson
- Nationality: Sweden
- Born: 9 September 1966 (age 60) Bethesda, Maryland, U.S.
- Height: 1.75 m (5 ft 9 in)
- Spouse: Tullia Mednickson

Career
- Sport: Golf
- Turned professional: 1989
- Current tour: European Senior Tour
- Former tours: European Tour; PGA Tour
- Professional wins: 7

Number of wins by tour
- European Tour: 1
- Challenge Tour: 6 (Tied-5th all-time)
- Other: 1

Best results in major championships
- Masters Tournament: DNP
- PGA Championship: DNP
- U.S. Open: DNP
- The Open Championship: T34: 2003

Achievements and awards
- Swedish Golf Tour Order of Merit winner: 1996

Adam Mednick (born 9 September 1966) is a Swedish professional golfer.

== Early life ==
Mednick was born in Bethesda, Maryland, in the United States to an American father and a Swedish mother, and moved to Sweden when he was eight years old. His great-grandparents emigrated from Kiev in Ukraine, and the authorities in the United States changed their family name from Mednikov to Mednick.

== Amateur career ==
Mednick had a successful amateur career, representing Gävle Golf Club, situated 180 kilometres north of Stockholm, Sweden, in the same player generation as club mates, European Tour winner to be, Peter Hedblom and 1988 Amateur Championship winner Cristian Härdin. When Härdin became the first Swede to play in The Masters Tournament at Augusta National Golf Club in April 1989, Mednick caddied for him. Mednick also caddied for Härdin at the 1988 Amateur Championship triumph, after Mednick had lost and been kicked out from the tournament in an early round.

Mednick lost in the final of the 1984 Boys Amateur Championship against Lee Vannet, Scotland, 2 and 1 at Royal Portcawl Golf Club, Wales.

Mednick represented Sweden at the 1984 European Boys' Team Championship at Royal St George's Golf Club, England, as one of the five best male players up to 18 years of age in Sweden, in the same team as future Ryder Cup-player Per-Ulrik Johansson.

In June 1986, Mednick won the Scottish Youth Championship at Cawder Golf Club, Glasgow, with a score of 282, nine strokes ahead of the nearest competitor.

In 1986, Mednick began at college in Jacksonville, Florida, to combine studies with golf training, but left school after the first year and moved back to Sweden.

Mednick was a candidate to be selected for the Swedish team at the 1988 Eisenhower Trophy on home soil in Stockholm, but did not make the team and turned professional before the 1989 season.

== Professional career ==
In 1990, Mednick won the most prestigious title on the Swedish Golf Tour, the Swedish PGA Championship, that year named Länsförsäkringar Open and also part of the Challenge Tour. Mednick finished second on the 1990 Swedish Golf Tour Order of Merit. After winning the Swedish PGA Championship again in 1996, this time named the Compaq Open, as well as the 1996 Swedish Match-play Championship, he finished the 1996 season on top of the Swedish Golf Tour Order of Merit.

Mednick played on the European Tour and the second tier Challenge Tour between 1990 and 2006 but his career was restricted by a back injury sustained in 1995.

He won one tournament at the top level, the 2002 North West of Ireland Open at Ballyliffin, Ireland, which was dual-ranked with the European Tour and the Challenge Tour. Mednick became the 18th Swedish winner on the European Tour with the 47th victory by a Swedish player.

On 18 October 2002, Mednick achieved a career highest world ranking of 295.

In 2008, Mednick coached the successful European Palmer Cup team together with Mårten Olander.

Mednick made his debut on the European Senior Tour at the inaugural Paris Legends Championship the same day he turned 50, making him eligible for the competition at Le Golf National. His former room-mate and compatriot Magnus Persson Atlevi would go on to secure his first Senior Tour title at the tournament.

== Personal life ==
Mednick competes on the senior tour as Adam Mednickson. After his career on the European Tour he married Tullia Johansson. The couple considered calling themselves Mednick-Johansson until their 4-year-old son Tom suggested the more easy to pronounce portmanteau of Mednickson, which became the family's legal name.

After his playing career on the regular tour, Mednick found interest in playing golf with hickory sticks. He has attended the Swedish Hickory Championship several times and twice finished second.

Mednick has worked with golf course design together with Pierre Fulke, former tournament professional and one of Sweden's most respected golf course architects.

== Amateur wins ==
- 1986 Scottish Youths Amateur Championship

== Professional wins (7) ==
=== European Tour wins (1) ===
No.	Date	Tournament	Winning score	Margin of victory	Runners-up
1	18 Aug 2002	North West of Ireland Open^{1}	−7 (76-68-69-68=281)	5 strokes	(Scotland) Andrew Coltart, (Italy) Costantino Rocca

^{1}Dual-ranking event with the Challenge Tour

=== Challenge Tour wins (6) ===
No.	Date	Tournament	Winning score	Margin of victory	Runner(s)-up
1	26 Aug 1990	Länsförsäkringar Open	−7 (73-71-66-71=281)	2 strokes	(Republic of Ireland) Eoghan O'Connell, (England) Jeff Pinsent
2	6 Jun 1993	Challenge Chargeurs	−10 (67-71-72-68=278)	1 stroke	(France) Dominique Nouailhac
3	4 Sep 1994	Compaq Open (2)	−1 (68-70-76-73=287)	2 strokes	(Sweden) Dennis Edlund, (Sweden) Mats Hallberg
4	25 Aug 1996	Toyota Danish PGA Championship	−11 (66-67-69=202)	1 stroke	(Sweden) Patrik Gottfridson
5	8 Sep 1996	SM Match Play	2 and 1		(Sweden) Freddie Jacobson
6	18 Aug 2002	North West of Ireland Open^{1}	−7 (76-68-69-68=281)	5 strokes	(Scotland) Andrew Coltart, (Italy) Costantino Rocca

^{1}Dual-ranking event with the European Tour

Challenge Tour playoff record (0–1)

No.	Year	Tournament	Opponent	Result
1	1996	SIAB Open	(Finland) Kalle Väinölä	Lost to birdie on second extra hole

=== Swedish Golf Tour wins (1) ===
No.	Date	Tournament	Winning score	Margin of victory	Runners-up
1	5 Jul 1998	GE Capital Bank Open	−12 (68-64-63=195)	12 strokes	(Sweden) Niclas Björnsson, (Finland) Kim Torbjörn Wiik

== Results in major championships ==
Tournament	1996	1997	1998	1999	2000	2001	2002	2003
The Open Championship	CUT						CUT	T34

Note: Mednick only played in The Open Championship.

Did not play

CUT = missed the half-way cut
"T" = tied

== Team appearances ==
Amateur

- Jacques Léglise Trophy (representing the Continent of Europe): 1984
- European Boys' Team Championship (representing Sweden): 1984

== See also ==
- 1996 PGA Tour Qualifying School graduates
- List of golfers with most Challenge Tour wins
