= Fredrik Henge =

Swedish golfer

Personal information
- Full name: Fredrik Henge
- Nationality: Sweden
- Born: 30 December 1974 (age 51) Lund, Sweden
- Height: 1.76 m (5 ft 9 in)

Career
- Sport: Golf
- Turned professional: 1997
- Former tours: European Tour; Challenge Tour
- Professional wins: 6

Number of wins by tour
- Challenge Tour: 5 (Tied-8th all-time)
- Other: 1

Best results in major championships
- Masters Tournament: DNP
- PGA Championship: DNP
- U.S. Open: DNP
- The Open Championship: CUT: 1998

Achievements and awards
- Swedish Golf Tour Order of Merit winner: 1997

Fredrik Henge (born 30 December 1974) is a Swedish professional golfer.

== Career ==
In 1974, Henge was born in Lund, Sweden.

In 1997, Henge turned professional. He has earned his place on the top level European Tour several times, the first via qualifying school at the end of 1997 and twice by his position on the Challenge Tour Rankings but has failed to win enough money on each occasion to retain his card.

Henge has had most of his success on the second tier Challenge Tour, where he has won five tournaments, two in both 1997 and 2000, when he finished seventh on the end of season rankings, and one in 2004.

His best finish on the European Tour was tied 7th at the 2006 Johnnie Walker Championship at Gleneagles, Perthshire, Scotland. He finished 29th at his home tournament in Sweden on the European Tour, the 2011 Nordea Masters at Brof Hof Slott, Stockholm, after being tied 9th after two rounds.

== Awards and honors ==
In 1997, Henge won the Swedish Golf Tour's Order of the Merit.

== Professional wins (6) ==
=== Challenge Tour wins (5) ===
No.	Date	Tournament	Winning score	Margin of victory	Runner(s)-up
1	31 Aug 1997	Toyota Danish PGA Championship	−14 (65-66-71=202)	2 strokes	(Sweden) Martin Erlandsson, (Denmark) Søren Kjeldsen
2	5 Oct 1997	Telia InfoMedia Grand Prix	−11 (71-69-65=205)	1 stroke	(Denmark) Steen Tinning
3	4 May 2000	Danish Open	−10 (70-71-70-67=278)	2 strokes	(Sweden) Joakim Rask
4	3 Sep 2000	Formby Hall Challenge	−10 (71-67-64-67=270)	Playoff	(England) Simon Khan
5	25 Jul 2004	JJB Sports North West Challenge	−8 (67-69-69-67=272)	1 stroke	(England) Lee Slattery

Challenge Tour playoff record (1–0)

No.	Year	Tournament	Opponent	Result
1	2000	Formby Hall Challenge	(England) Simon Khan	Won with birdie on first extra hole

=== Nordic Golf League wins (1) ===
No.	Date	Tournament	Winning score	Margin of victory	Runner-up
1	25 Oct 2009	Backtee Race to HimmerLand	−14 (60-69-73=202)	Playoff	(Sweden) Mattias Eliasson

== Results in major championships ==
Tournament	1998
The Open Championship	CUT

CUT = missed the half-way cut
Note: Henge only played in The Open Championship.

== See also ==
- List of golfers with most Challenge Tour wins
