= Black Desert NI Legends =

Tournament information
- Location: Ballymena, Northern Ireland
- Established: 2025
- Course: Galgorm Castle Golf Club
- Par: 72
- Length: 6,930 yards (6,340 m)
- Tour: European Senior Tour
- Format: Stroke play
- Prize fund: €450,000
- Month played: August

Tournament record score
- Aggregate: 204 Markus Brier
- To par: −12 as above

Current champion
- (Austria) Markus Brier

Location map
- Location in Northern Ireland

The Black Desert NI Legends is a European Senior Tour professional golf tournament played at Galgorm Castle Golf Club in Ballymena, Northern Ireland, first played in 2025.

== History ==
The 2025 event was hosted at Galgorm Castle Golf Club in Ballymena, Northern Ireland; which had previously hosted the 2020 Dubai Duty Free Irish Open, as well as the Northern Ireland Open on the Challenge Tour. It was sponsored by the Black Desert Resort, also sponsoring the Black Desert Championship on the PGA Tour and previously the 2024 edition of the Black Desert NI Open on the Challenge Tour, also held at Galgorm Castle GC. Markus Brier won the inaugural event, two shots clear of Mikael Lundberg.

== Winners ==
| Year | Winner | Score | To par | Margin of victory | Runner-up |
|---|---|---|---|---|---|
| 2025 | (Austria) Markus Brier | 204 | −12 | 2 strokes | (Sweden) Mikael Lundberg |
