= Campeonato de Castilla =

Golf tournament in Spain

El Corte Inglés Open
Tournament information
- Location: Madrid, Spain
- Established: 1993
- Course: La Moraleja Golf
- Par: 72
- Tour: Challenge Tour
- Format: Stroke play Match play
- Prize fund: £30,000
- Month played: March
- Final year: 1994

Tournament record score
- Aggregate: 283 Juan Carlos Piñero (1994)
- To par: −5 as above
- Score: 21 holes Daniel Westermark (1993)

Final champion
- (Spain) Juan Carlos Piñero
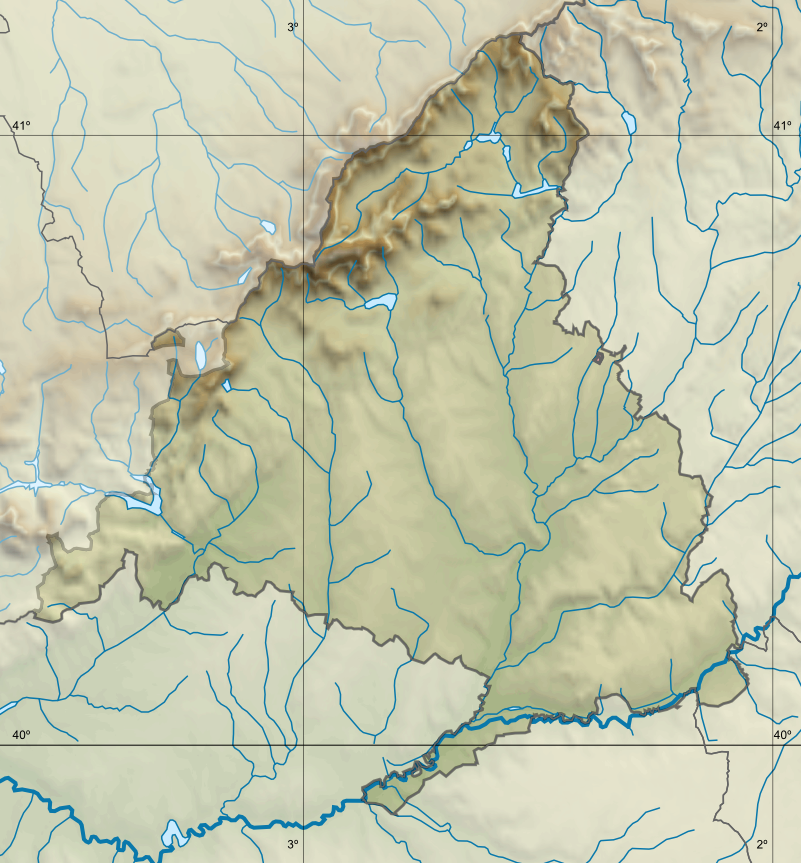
- Location in Spain Location in the Community of Madrid

The Campeonato de Castilla (Castile Championship), or El Corte Inglés Open as it was later renamed for sponsorship reasons, was a golf tournament on the Challenge Tour, played in Spain. It was held in 1993 and 1994 at La Moraleja Golf Club in Madrid.

== Winners ==
Year	Winner	Score	To par	Margin of victory	Runner-up	Ref.
El Corte Inglés Open
1994	(Spain) Juan Carlos Piñero	283	−5	1 stroke	(Sweden) Daniel Westermark	
Campeonato de Castilla
1993	(Sweden) Daniel Westermark	21 holes			(Spain) Tomás Jesus Muñoz	
