= Canarias Challenge =

Tournament information
- Location: Gran Canaria, Spain
- Established: 1994
- Course: Las Palmas Golf Club
- Par: 71
- Tour: Challenge Tour
- Format: Stroke play
- Prize fund: £55,000
- Month played: May
- Final year: 1997

Tournament record score
- Aggregate: 268 Robert Lee (1996); 268 Michele Reale (1997); 268 Scott Watson (1997)
- To par: −16 as above

Final champion
- (Italy) Michele Reale
- Location in the Canary Islands Location in Gran Canaria

The Canarias Challenge was a golf tournament on the Challenge Tour, played in Spain. It was held between 1994 and 1997 at Las Palmas Golf Club in the Canary Islands.

== Winners ==
Year	Winner	Score	To par	Margin of victory	Runner(s)-up	Ref.
Canarias Challenge
1997	(Italy) Michele Reale	268	−16	Playoff	(England) Scott Watson	
1996	(England) Robert Lee	268	−16	5 strokes	(England) Simon Burnell (Sweden) Joakim Rask	
1995	(Spain) Pedro Linhart	275	−9	1 stroke	(Spain) Ignacio Feliu	
Centenario Copa Palmer
1994	(Sweden) Daniel Westermark	275	−13	3 strokes	(Denmark) Henrik Simonsen	
