= 1994 Eisenhower Trophy =

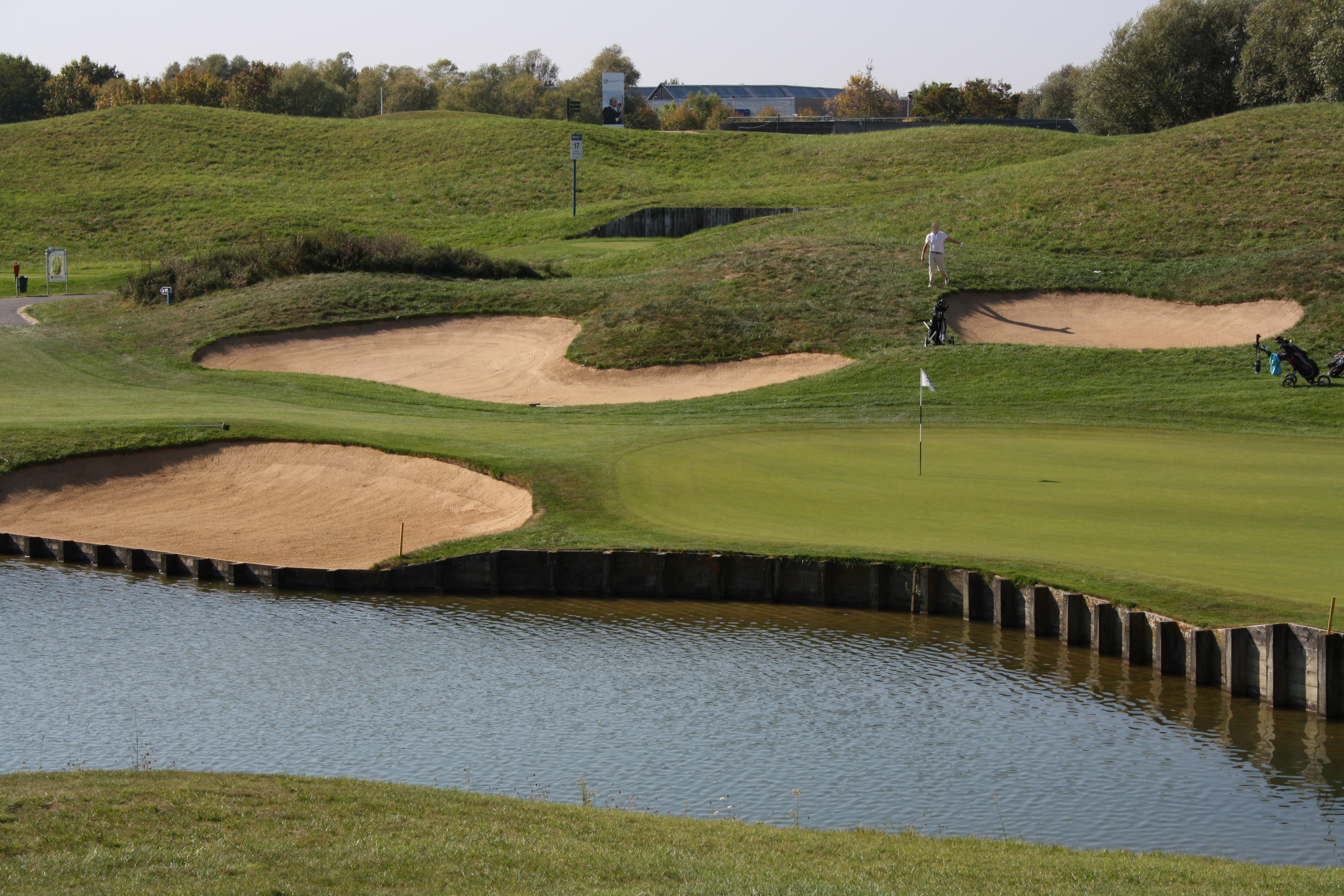
- Albatros Course at Le Golf National

Tournament information
- Dates: 6–9 October
- Location: Versailles, France; 48.7532°N 2.0755°E
- Courses: Le Golf National (Albatros course); La Boulie (La Vallée course)
- Format: 72 holes stroke play

Statistics
- Par: 72 (Albatros); 71 (La Vallée)
- Field: 44 teams 176 players

Champion
- United States; Todd Demsey, Allen Doyle, John Harris & Tiger Woods
- 838 (−23)

Location map
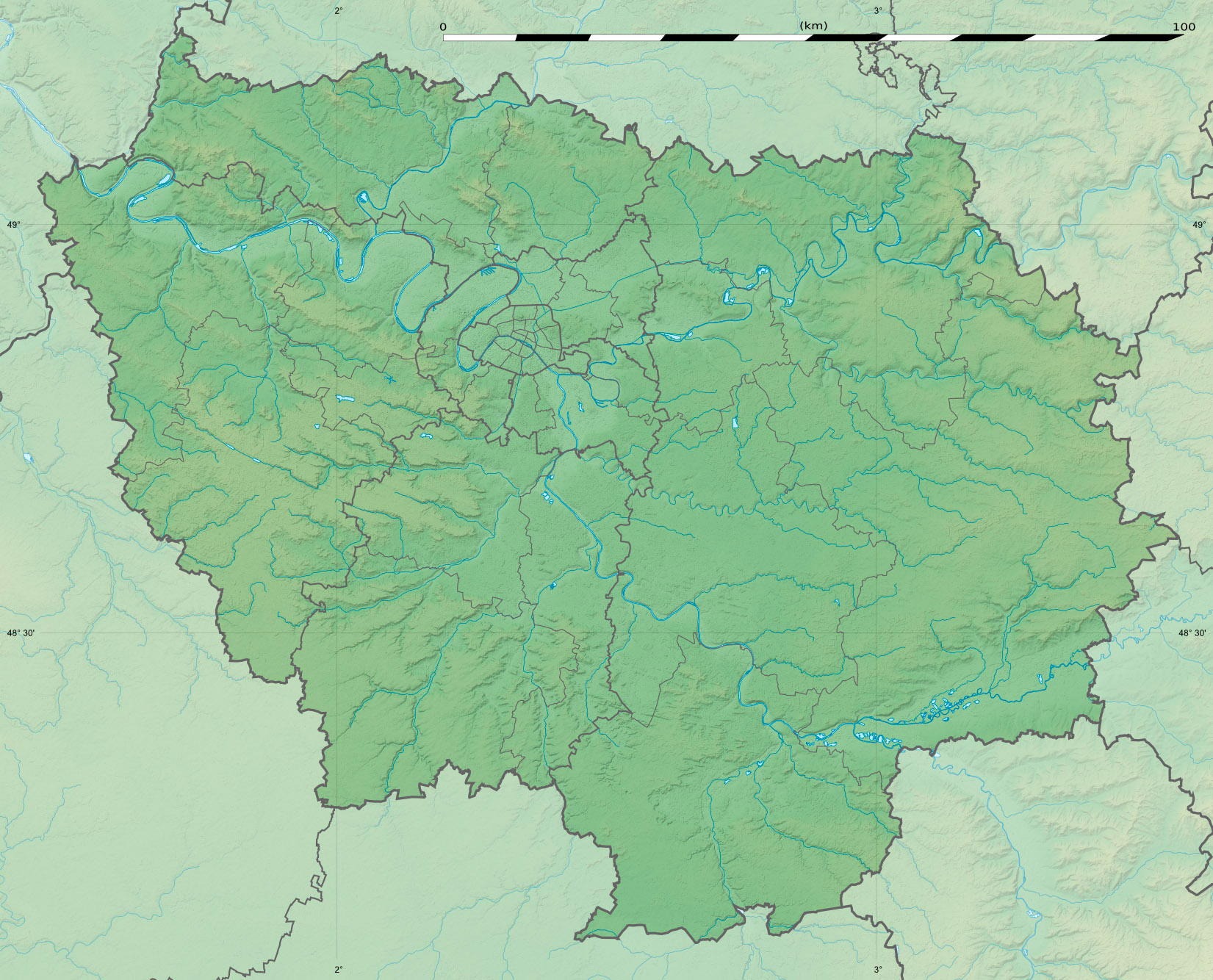
- Location in France Location in Île-de-France

The 1994 Eisenhower Trophy took place 6 to 9 October on the Albatros course at Le Golf National and on La Vallée course at La Boulie near Versailles, France. It was the 19th World Amateur Team Championship for the Eisenhower Trophy. The tournament was a 72-hole stroke play team event with 45 four-man teams. The best three scores for each round counted towards the team total. Initially each team played one round on each of the two courses. The leading 24 teams then played two further rounds at Le Golf National while the remaining teams played two rounds at La Boulie.

The United States won the Eisenhower Trophy for the first time since 1982, finishing 11 strokes ahead of the silver medalists, Great Britain and Ireland. Sweden took the bronze medal with Australia in fourth place. Allen Doyle had the lowest individual score, 10-under-par 277, four strokes better than Warren Bennett.

The 1994 Espirito Santo Trophy was played at Le Golf National one week prior.

== Teams ==
44 four-man teams contested the event.

The following table lists the players on the leading teams.

Country	Players
Australia	Greg Chalmers, Jason Dawes, Brett Partridge, Lester Peterson
Austria	Markus Brier, Philipp Mensi-Klarbach, Rudi Sailer, Niki Zitny
Belgium	Jack Boeckx, Didier de Vooght, Nicolas Todtenhaupt, Nicolas Vanhootegem
Canada	Bryan DeCorso, Stu Hamilton, Rob McMillan, Warren Sye
Great Britain & Ireland	Warren Bennett, Stephen Gallacher, Lee S. James, Gordon Sherry
Netherlands	Robert-Jan Derksen, Jeroen Germes, Maarten Lafeber, Michael Vogel
New Zealand	Steven Alker, Simon Bittle, Mark Brown, Marcus Wheelhouse
Spain	Francisco Cea, Francisco de Pablo, Ivó Giner, Francisco Valera
Sweden	Kalle Brink, Eric Carlberg, Freddie Jacobson, Mikael Lundberg
United States	Todd Demsey, Allen Doyle, John Harris, Tiger Woods

== Scores ==
Place	Country	Score	To par
1st place, gold medalist(s)	United States	208-214-207-209=838	−23
2nd place, silver medalist(s)	Great Britain & Ireland	213-208-209-219=849	−12
3rd place, bronze medalist(s)	Sweden	210-221-213-211=855	−6
4	Australia	212-211-210-225=858	−3
5	New Zealand	218-215-209-218=860	−1
6	Spain	220-217-210-219=866	+5
7	Belgium	219-217-216-220=872	+11
T8	Austria	218-212-219-229=878	+17
T8	Netherlands	222-217-221-218=878	+17
10	Canada	219-220-219-222=880	+19
11	Japan	227-215-218-222=882	+21
T12	Brazil	224-216-227-217=884	+23
T12	South Africa	214-218-222-230=884	+23
T14	France	227-218-223-219=887	+26
T14	Zimbabwe	227-223-219-218=887	+26
16	Italy	221-219-222-226=888	+27
17	Denmark	231-219-214-225=889	+28
18	Germany	229-223-222-219=893	+32
19	Norway	220-219-222-233=894	+33
20	Finland	222-220-229-224=895	+34
21	Argentina	225-229-221-222=897	+36
22	South Korea	230-225-221-222=898	+37
23	Chinese Taipei	227-220-223-240=910	+49
24	Venezuela	224-231-224-236=915	+54
25	Mexico	232-225-221-215=893	+38
26	Switzerland	239-222-226-219=906	+51
27	Colombia	235-226-222-228=911	+56
28	Portugal	231-239-225-220=915	+60
29	Costa Rica	230-231-231-227=919	+64
30	Chile	236-232-225-227=920	+65
31	Puerto Rico	228-231-235-228=922	+67
32	Peru	???-???-???-???=???	+??
33	Czech Republic	240-234-228-228=930	+75
34	Philippines	231-240-234-226=931	+76
35	Bermuda	229-229-238-239=935	+80
36	Iceland	235-238-232-233=938	+83
37	Hong Kong	238-238-234-235=945	+90
38	Morocco	242-232-240-239=953	+98
39	Pakistan	248-250-235-241=974	+119
40	Guatemala	249-242-249-237=977	+122
41	Luxembourg	261-248-237-246=992	+137
42	Latvia	255-247-247-250=999	+144
43	Israel	265-249-246-248=1008	+153
44	El Salvador	266-256-266-249=1037	+182

The leading 24 teams played the third and fourth rounds at Le Golf National while the remaining teams played at La Boulie.

== Individual leaders ==
There was no official recognition for the lowest individual scores.

Place	Player	Country	Score	To par
1	Allen Doyle	United States	68-70-69-70=277	−10
2	Warren Bennett	Great Britain & Ireland	72-68-67-74=281	−6
3	Lee S. James	Great Britain & Ireland	69-66-72-75=282	−5
T4	Mark Brown	New Zealand	72-69-69-73=283	−4
T4	Freddie Jacobson	Sweden	67-73-73-70=283	−4
6	Tiger Woods	United States	70-75-67-72=284	−3
T7	Francisco Cea	Spain	69-72-70-74=285	−2
T7	Jason Dawes	Australia	70-73-63-79=285	−2
T7	Mikael Lundberg	Sweden	68-72-68-77=285	−2
T10	Simon Bittle	New Zealand	73-71-70-72=286	−1
T10	John Harris	United States	70-77-72-67=286	−1

Players in the leading teams played three rounds at Le Golf National and one at La Boulie.
