= Anssi Kankkonen =

Finnish professional golfer

Personal information
- Nationality: Finland
- Born: 11 October 1968 (age 58) Lahti, Finland
- Height: 1.81 m (5 ft 11 in)

Career
- Sport: Golf
- Turned professional: 1990
- Former tours: European Tour; Challenge Tour
- Professional wins: 4

Number of wins by tour
- Challenge Tour: 3
- Other: 1

Anssi Kankkonen (born 11 October 1968) is a Finnish professional golfer who played on the European Tour.

Kankkonen was born in Lahti, the son of former Olympic ski jumping champion Veikko Kankkonen, and followed in his father's footsteps winning a team competition in the Finnish Championships with the Lahti Ski Club team in 1985, before turning to golf. As an amateur, he represented Finland at the 1990 Eisenhower Trophy. He turned professional in 1990 and played on the Swedish Golf Tour before joining the Challenge Tour.

Kankkonen recorded his first Challenge Tour win at the 1995 SIAB Open, and almost won another tournament back-to-back, losing a playoff to Thomas Bjørn at the Himmerland Open. He played on the 1996 European Tour but recorded only one top-10, at the English Open, and returned to the Challenge Tour in 1997 where he won two tournaments, the Alianca UAP Challenge in Portugal after triumphing in a three-way playoff, and the Rolex Trophy Pro-Am in Switzerland. He would have made it three but lost a playoff with Knud Storgaard in the season opener, the Ivory Coast Open. He finished fifth on the Challenge Tour ranking to re-join the European Tour in 1998.

Kankkonen represented Finland at five World Cups (1991, 1992, 1994, 1995, 1997) with a best finish of 19th together with Kalle Väinölä in 1995.

== Professional wins (4) ==
=== Challenge Tour wins (3) ===
No.	Date	Tournament	Winning score	Margin of victory	Runner(s)-up
1	4 Jun 1995	SIAB Open	−1 (74-69-68-72=283)	2 strokes	(Finland) Kalle Väinölä
2	27 Apr 1997	Alianca UAP Challenger	−20 (64-63-70-71=268)	Playoff	(Sweden) Fredrik Lindgren, (Belgium) Nicolas Vanhootegem
3	20 Jul 1997	Rolex Trophy Pro-Am	−12 (66-67-72-71=276)	1 stroke	(Norway) Thomas Nielsen

Challenge Tour playoff record (1–2)

No.	Year	Tournament	Opponent(s)	Result
1	1995	Himmerland Open	(Denmark) Thomas Bjørn, (Belgium) Nicolas Vanhootegem	Bjørn won with birdie on first extra hole
2	1997	Open de Côte d'Ivoire	(Denmark) Knud Storgaard	
3	1997	Alianca UAP Challenger	(Sweden) Fredrik Lindgren, (Belgium) Nicolas Vanhootegem	

=== Nordic Golf League wins (1) ===
No.	Date	Tournament	Winning score	Margin of victory	Runner-up
1	7 Sep 2001	PGA Finnish Championship	−8 (71-69-68=208)	1 stroke	(Finland) Kalle Aitala

== Team appearances ==
Amateur

- Eisenhower Trophy (representing Finland): 1990

Professional

- World Cup (representing Finland): 1991, 1992, 1994, 1995, 1997

== See also ==
- 1995 Challenge Tour graduates
