= Ian Garbutt =

English golfer (born 1972)

Personal information
- Full name: Ian David Garbutt
- Nationality: England
- Born: 3 April 1972 (age 54) Doncaster, England
- Height: 5 ft 10 in (1.78 m)
- Weight: 172 lb (78 kg; 12.3 st)

Career
- Sport: Golf
- Turned professional: 1992
- Former tour: European Tour
- Professional wins: 1

Number of wins by tour
- Challenge Tour: 1

Best results in major championships
- Masters Tournament: DNP
- PGA Championship: DNP
- U.S. Open: DNP
- The Open Championship: T50: 2002

Achievements and awards
- Challenge Tour Rankings winner: 1996

Ian David Garbutt (born 3 April 1972) is an English professional golfer.

== Early life and amateur career ==
Garbutt was born in Doncaster. He started playing golf at the age of 8, and by the age of 16, he had become a scratch player. He won the English Amateur at the age of 18, defeating Gary Evans in the final.

== Professional career ==
In 1992, Garbutt turned professional. He played on the European and Challenge Tours, sometimes splitting his time between both, until the end of 2008. Having lost his place on the European Tour at the end of the season, he retired from tournament golf early the following year to take up a position with sports management group ISM.

In 1996, Garbutt finished top of the Challenge Tour Rankings, after winning the UAP Grand Final.

== Amateur wins ==
- 1989 Carris Trophy
- 1990 English Amateur

== Professional wins (1) ==
=== Challenge Tour wins (1) ===
Legend
Tour Championships (1)
Other Challenge Tour (0)

No.	Date	Tournament	Winning score	Margin of victory	Runners-up
1	20 Oct 1996	UAP Grand Final	−16 (67-71-67-67=272)	2 strokes	(England) Van Phillips, (Denmark) Ben Tinning

== Results in major championships ==
Tournament	1993	1994	1995	1996	1997	1998	1999	2000	2001	2002
The Open Championship	T51							T52		T50

Note: Garbutt only played in The Open Championship.

Did not play

"T" = tied

== Team appearances ==
Amateur

- European Boys' Team Championship (representing England): 1989, 1990
- Jacques Léglise Trophy (representing Great Britain & Ireland): 1989 (winners)
- St Andrews Trophy (representing Great Britain & Ireland): 1992 (winners)
- European Amateur Team Championship (representing England): 1991 (winners), 1993
- European Youths' Team Championship (representing England): 1992,
