= Austrian Open (golf) =

Golf tournament

Austrian Alpine Open
Tournament information
- Location: Kitzbühel, Austria
- Established: 1990
- Course: Golfclub Kitzbühel-Schwarzsee-Reith
- Par: 70
- Length: 6,822 yards (6,238 m)
- Tours: European Tour; Challenge Tour
- Format: Stroke play
- Prize fund: US$2,750,000
- Month played: May

Tournament record score
- Aggregate: 261 Markus Brier (2004); 261 Nicolai von Dellingshausen (2025)
- To par: −23 Markus Brier (2004)

Current champion
- (Japan) Kota Kaneko

Location map
- Location in Austria

The Austrian Open is a men's professional golf tournament on the European Tour. It was founded in 1990, and was a European Tour event for seven straight years up to 1996, being held under a variety of names due to regular changes of title sponsor. The tournament dropped down to the Challenge Tour schedule between 1997 and 2005, with a sharp reduction in prize money, before returning to the main tour for the 2006 season. In 2012, it was announced that the Austrian shopping community Lyoness and its affiliated Greenfinity foundation would be the title sponsors for three seasons.

== History ==
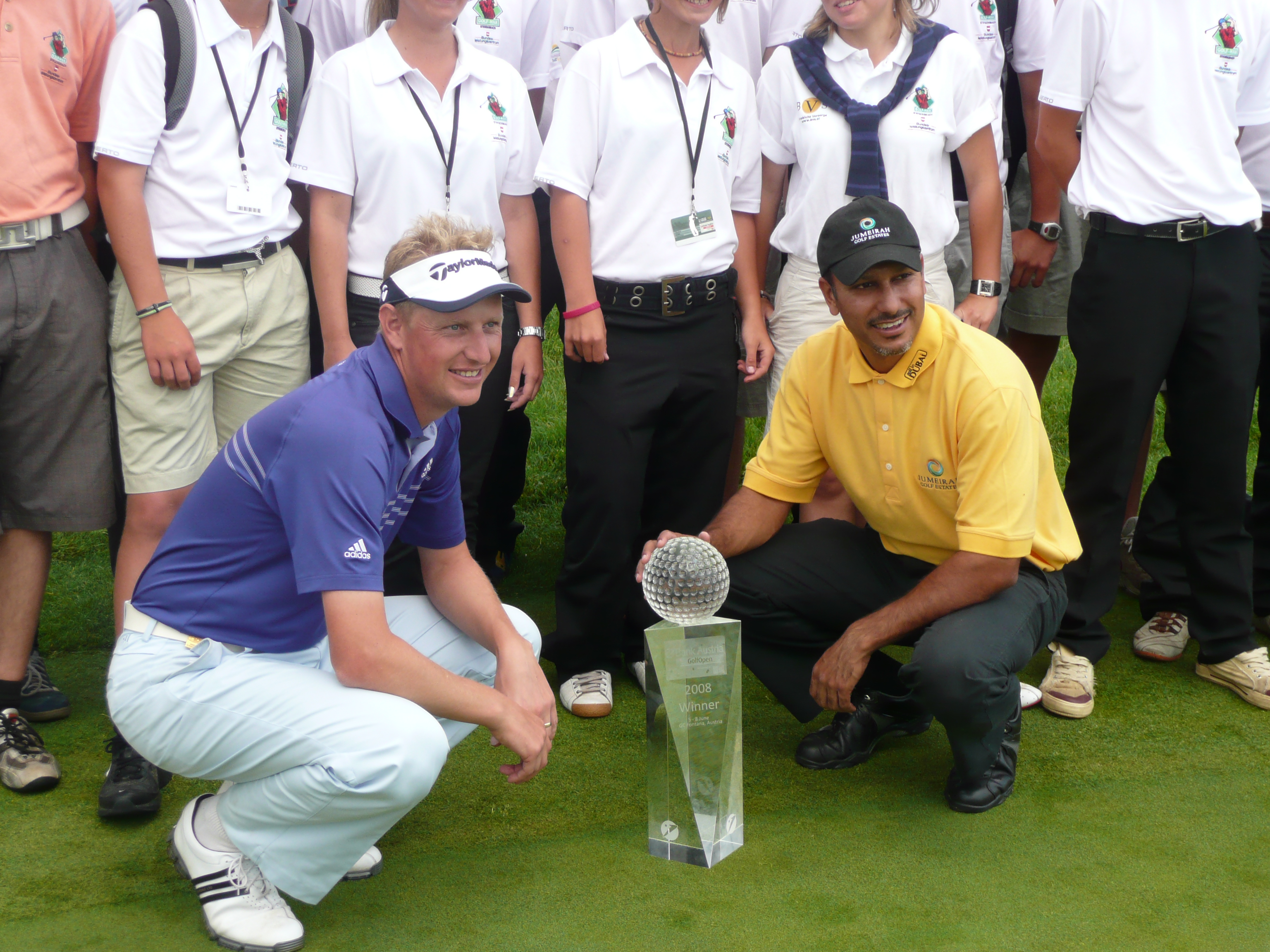
2008 Jeev Milkha Singh from India won (in the yellow shirt)

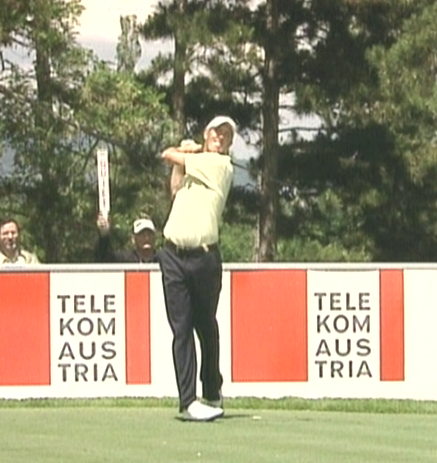
The Australian Richard Green won in 2007

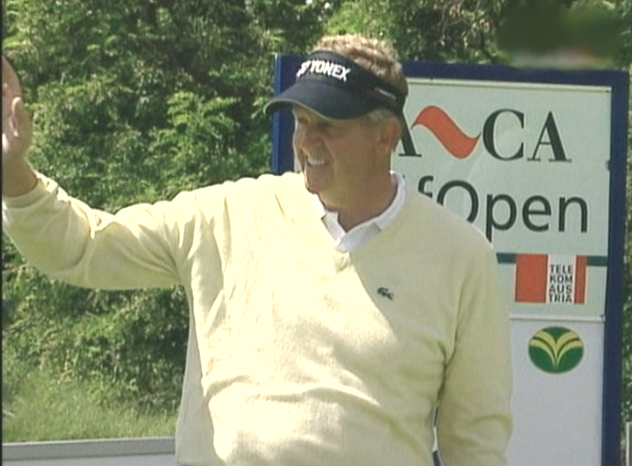
Colin Montgomerie at the Austrian Open 2006

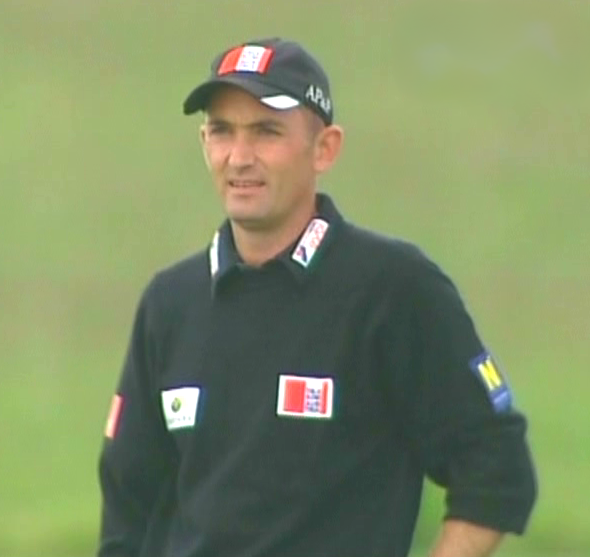
The Austrian Markus Brier, three-time winner of the Austrian Open

The 2018 event was the first professional tournament to use a shot clock on every shot. The official European Tour time allowances were used: a 50-second allowance for a “first to play approach shot (including a par three tee shot), chip or putt” and a 40-second allowance for a “tee shot on a par four or par five, or second or third to play approach shot, chip or putt”. Players that failed to play within these time limits incurred a one-shot penalty, which was added to their score for that hole. Players had two “time-extensions” in each round, each giving them an extra 40 seconds.

From 2010 to 2021, the tournament was held at the Diamond Country Club in Atzenbrugg, Lower Austria, 35 km west of Vienna.

In 2020, the tournament was a dual-ranking event with the Challenge Tour, due to a revamp of the European Tour's schedule because of COVID-19 pandemic. After returning again in 2021, the tournament was not played between 2022 and 2024. In November 2024, alongside the 2025 European Tour schedule announcement, it was confirmed that the Austrian Open would return in May 2025, being played at Gut Altentann Golf Club in Salzburg.

== Winners ==
Year	Tour(s) (Note: CHA − Challenge Tour; EUR − European Tour.)	Winner	Score	To par	Margin of victory	Runner(s)-up
Austrian Alpine Open
2026	EUR	(Japan) Kota Kaneko	262	−18	2 strokes	(United States) Davis Bryant (Portugal) Ricardo Gouveia
2025	EUR	(Germany) Nicolai von Dellingshausen	261	−19	2 strokes	(Norway) Kristoffer Reitan (Germany) Marcel Schneider
2022–2024: No tournament
Austrian Golf Open
2021	EUR	(United States) John Catlin	274	−14	Playoff	(Germany) Maximilian Kieffer
Austrian Open
2020	CHA, EUR	(Scotland) Marc Warren	275	−13	1 stroke	(Germany) Marcel Schneider
2019: No tournament
Shot Clock Masters
2018	EUR	(Finland) Mikko Korhonen	272	−16	6 strokes	(Scotland) Connor Syme
Lyoness Open
2017	EUR	(South Africa) Dylan Frittelli	276	−12	1 stroke	(England) David Horsey (Finland) Mikko Korhonen (South Africa) Jbe' Kruger
2016	EUR	(China) Wu Ashun	275	−13	1 stroke	(Spain) Adrián Otaegui
2015	EUR	(England) Chris Wood	273	−15	2 strokes	(Spain) Rafa Cabrera-Bello
2014	EUR	(Sweden) Mikael Lundberg	276	−12	Playoff	(Austria) Bernd Wiesberger
2013	EUR	(Netherlands) Joost Luiten	271	−17	2 strokes	(Denmark) Thomas Bjørn
2012	EUR	(Austria) Bernd Wiesberger	269	−19	3 strokes	(France) Thomas Levet (Republic of Ireland) Shane Lowry
Austrian Golf Open
2011	EUR	(England) Kenneth Ferrie	276	−12	Playoff	(England) Simon Wakefield
2010	EUR	(Spain) José Manuel Lara	271	−17	Playoff	(England) David Lynn
2009	EUR	(Spain) Rafa Cabrera-Bello	264	−20	1 stroke	(England) Benn Barham
Bank Austria GolfOpen
2008	EUR	(India) Jeev Milkha Singh	198 (Note: Shortened to 54 holes due to rain.)	−15	1 stroke	(England) Simon Wakefield
BA-CA Golf Open
2007	EUR	(Australia) Richard Green	268	−16	Playoff	(France) Jean-François Remésy
2006	EUR	(Austria) Markus Brier (3)	266	−18	3 strokes	(Denmark) Søren Hansen
2005	CHA	(Northern Ireland) Michael Hoey	265	−19	1 stroke	(Sweden) Steven Jeppesen
2004	CHA	(Austria) Markus Brier (2)	261	−23	8 strokes	(Finland) Roope Kakko (England) Lee Slattery
2003	CHA	(England) Robert Coles	275	−13	Playoff	(Australia) Steven Bowditch
Austrian Golf Open
2002	CHA	(Austria) Markus Brier	267	−21	1 stroke	(Germany) Gary Birch Jr.
Austrian Open
2001	CHA	(England) Chris Gane	270	−18	1 stroke	(England) Andrew Marshall
2000: No tournament
Diners Club Austrian Open
1999	CHA	(Switzerland) Juan Ciola	263	−17	Playoff	(New Zealand) Elliot Boult
1998	CHA	(United States) Kevin Carissimi	269	−11	2 strokes	(Austria) Markus Brier (Sweden) Per Jacobson (England) David R. Jones
Matchmaker Austrian Open
1997	CHA	(Germany) Erol Şimşek	266	−14	3 strokes	(United States) Kevin Carissimi (England) David Lynn (Denmark) Steen Tinning
Hohe Brücke Open
1996	EUR	(Republic of Ireland) Paul McGinley	269	−19	1 stroke	(England) David Lynn (Spain) Juan Carlos Piñero
1995	EUR	(Germany) Alex Čejka	267	−21	4 strokes	(Spain) Ignacio Garrido (Netherlands) Rolf Muntz (Northern Ireland) Ronan Rafferty
1994	EUR	(England) Mark Davis (2)	270	−18	2 strokes	(Republic of Ireland) Philip Walton
Hohe Brücke Austrian Open
1993	EUR	(Northern Ireland) Ronan Rafferty	274	−14	Playoff	(Denmark) Anders Sørensen
Mitsubishi Austrian Open
1992	EUR	(England) Peter Mitchell	271	−17	1 stroke	(Australia) Peter Fowler (England) David J. Russell (England) Jamie Spence
1991	EUR	(England) Mark Davis	269	−19	5 strokes	(England) Michael McLean
Austrian Open
1990	EUR	(West Germany) Bernhard Langer	271	−17	Playoff	(United States) Lanny Wadkins

== See also ==
- Open golf tournament
