= Daniel Westermark =

Swedish professional golfer

Personal information
- Full name: Daniel Westermark
- Nationality: Sweden
- Born: 6 April 1963 (age 63) Stockholm, Sweden
- Height: 1.75 m (5 ft 9 in)
- Weight: 72 kg (159 lb; 11.3 st)

Career
- Sport: Golf
- Turned professional: 1985
- Former tours: European Tour; Challenge Tour
- Professional wins: 3

Number of wins by tour
- Challenge Tour: 2
- Other: 1

Daniel Westermark (born 6 April 1963) is a Swedish professional golfer.

Westermark enjoyed success on the Challenge Tour in the early 1990s where he won the 1993 Campeonato de Castilla and the 1994 Centenario Copa Palmer. He also finished runner-up in the 1991 Neuchatel Open, 1993 Kenya Open, 1994 Neuchatel Open, 1994 Tessali Open, 1994 El Corte Ingles Open, 1996 Is Molas Challenge and the 1998 Volvo Finnish Open.

Westermark qualified for the 1995 European Tour and finished 165th on the Order of Merit. In total, he played 61 European Tour events between 1987 and 2000, earning €46,447 in official prize money.

Westermark later become the club professional at El Paraiso Golf Club in Estepona, Spain. He claimed the 16th and final card at qualifying school in Portugal to earn conditional playing rights for the 2015 European Senior Tour season.

== Professional wins (3) ==
=== Challenge Tour wins (2) ===
No.	Date	Tournament	Winning score	Margin of victory	Runner-up
1	4 Apr 1993	Campeonato de Castilla	21 holes		(Spain) Tomás Jesus Muñoz
2	30 Apr 1994	Centenario Copa Palmer	−13 (65-69-71-70=275)	3 strokes	(Denmark) Henrik Simonsen

Challenge Tour playoff record (0–1)

No.	Year	Tournament	Opponents	Result
1	1993	Kenya Open	(England) Peter Harrison, (Scotland) Craig Maltman	Maltman won with birdie on third extra hole

=== Swedish Golf Tour wins (1) ===
No.	Date	Tournament	Winning score	Margin of victory	Runners-up
1	10 Jul 1988	Scandinavian Tipo Trophy	−2 (71-68-75=214)	3 strokes	(Sweden) Mikael Karlsson, (Sweden) Nils-Åke Sandell
