= Farmfoods European Senior Masters =

Golf tournament

Champions UK plc European Senior Masters
Tournament information
- Location: La Manga, Murcia, Spain
- Established: 2017
- Courses: La Manga Club (South Course)
- Par: 73
- Length: 7,219 yards (6,601 m)
- Tour: European Senior Tour
- Format: Stroke play
- Prize fund: €400,000
- Month played: November

Tournament record score
- Aggregate: 200 Jean Hugo (2026)
- To par: −19 as above

Current champion
- (South Africa) Jean Hugo

Location map
- Location in Spain Location in Region of Murcia

The Champions UK plc European Senior Masters is a men's professional golf tournament for players aged 50 and above which is part of the European Senior Tour. It was first held in October 2017 at the Forest of Arden Hotel and Country Club, Meriden near Birmingham. In 2021, the event moved to the La Manga Club in Murcia, Spain.

== Winners ==
Year	Winner	Score	To par	Margin of victory	Runner(s)-up	Ref.
Champions UK plc European Senior Masters
2026	(South Africa) Jean Hugo	200	−19	1 stroke	(England) Van Phillips	
2025	(Wales) Jamie Donaldson	208	−11	1 stroke	(Germany) Thomas Gögele (Sweden) Mikael Lundberg (England) Van Phillips	
Farmfoods European Senior Masters
2024	(England) Simon Griffiths	202	−17	2 strokes	(England) Van Phillips	
2023	(Sweden) Patrik Sjöland	205	−14	1 stroke	(Argentina) Ricardo González	
2022	(Scotland) Paul Lawrie	202	−17	Playoff	(Sweden) Michael Jonzon	
2021	(Austria) Markus Brier	211	−5	2 strokes	(Argentina) Ricardo González	
2020: No tournament
2019	(France) Thomas Levet	206	−10	1 stroke	(Austria) Markus Brier	
2018	(Spain) Santiago Luna	206	−10	2 strokes	(Austria) Markus Brier (England) Peter T. Wilson	
2017	(Wales) Stephen Dodd	214	−2	1 stroke	(United States) Clark Dennis (Republic of Ireland) Paul McGinley	
