= Albarello (surname) =

Albarello is an Italian surname, see Albarello. Notable people with the surname include:

- Marco Albarello (born 1960), Italian cross-country skier
- Yves Albarello (born 1952), French politician

== See also ==
- Albarelli
- Albarello (disambiguation)
