= 2025 European Senior Tour =

Golf tour season

2025 European Senior Tour season
- Duration: 14 February 2025 – 7 December 2025
- Number of official events: 19
- Most wins: (Republic of Ireland) Pádraig Harrington (2) (Australia) Scott Hend (2)
- Order of Merit: (Australia) Scott Hend
- Rookie of the Year: (South Africa) Darren Fichardt

The 2025 European Senior Tour, titled as the 2025 Legends Tour, was the 33rd season of the European Senior Tour, the main professional golf tour in Europe for men aged 50 and over.

== Schedule ==
The following table lists official events during the 2025 season.

Date	Tournament	Host country	Purse (€)	Winner (Note: The number in brackets after each winner's name is the number of European Senior Tour events they had won up to and including that tournament. This information is only shown for European Senior Tour members.)	Notes
16 Feb	Staysure Marbella Legends	Spain	500,000	(England) Simon Griffiths (2)	New tournament
27 Apr	Barbados Legends	Barbados	US$600,000	(Australia) Scott Hend (2)	
17 May	OFX Irish Legends	Ireland	500,000	(South Africa) James Kingston (4)	
25 May	Senior PGA Championship	United States	US$3,500,000	(Argentina) Ángel Cabrera (2)	Senior major championship
14 Jun	Costa Navarino Legends Tour Trophy	Greece	500,000	(England) Peter Baker (8)	
29 Jun	U.S. Senior Open	United States	US$4,000,000	(Republic of Ireland) Pádraig Harrington (2)	Senior major championship
6 Jul	Reignwood Legends Championship	China	US$600,000	(South Africa) Keith Horne (2)	New tournament
13 Jul	Swiss Seniors Open	Switzerland	350,000	(New Zealand) Mark Brown (1)	
27 Jul	ISPS Handa Senior Open	England	US$2,850,000	(Republic of Ireland) Pádraig Harrington (3)	Senior major championship
3 Aug	Staysure PGA Seniors Championship	Scotland	1,000,000	(United States) Bo Van Pelt (1)	
24 Aug	Grass & Co. English Legends	England	450,000	(England) Steve Webster (1)	New tournament
31 Aug	Black Desert NI Legends	Northern Ireland	450,000	(Austria) Markus Brier (2)	New tournament
7 Sep	European Legends Cup	Spain	500,000	(Australia) Scott Hend (3)	
28 Sep	WINSTONgolf Senior Open	Germany	500,000	(Germany) Bernhard Langer (9)	
25 Oct	Sergio Melpignano Senior Italian Open	Italy	400,000	(England) Andrew Marshall (1)	
9 Nov	Champions UK plc European Senior Masters	Spain	350,000	(Wales) Jamie Donaldson (1)	
23 Nov	Vattanac Legends Championship	Cambodia	US$550,000	(Scotland) David Drysdale (1)	New tournament
28 Nov	Vattanac Legends Championship Legacy Edition	Cambodia	US$600,000	(South Africa) Darren Fichardt (1)	New tournament
7 Dec	MCB Mauritius Legends	Mauritius	US$750,000	(England) Greg Owen (1)	Tour Championship

== Order of Merit ==
The Order of Merit was based on tournament results during the season, calculated using a points-based system.

Position	Player	Points
1	(Australia) Scott Hend	4,781
2	(England) Peter Baker	3,875
3	(South Africa) Keith Horne	3,183
4	(South Africa) Darren Fichardt	2,947
5	(England) Greg Owen	2,904

== Awards ==
Award	Winner	Ref.
Rookie of the Year (Barry Lane Award)	(South Africa) Darren Fichardt	
