= Alianca UAP Challenger =

Tournament information
- Location: Lisbon, Portugal
- Established: 1996
- Course: Clube de Golf do Montado
- Par: 72
- Tour: Challenge Tour
- Format: Stroke play
- Prize fund: £55,000
- Month played: April
- Final year: 1997

Tournament record score
- Aggregate: 268 Anssi Kankkonen (1997); 268 Fredrik Lindgren (1997); 268 Nicolas Vanhootegem (1997)
- To par: −20 as above

Final champion
- (Finland) Anssi Kankkonen

Location map
- Location in Portugal

The Alianca UAP Challenger was a golf tournament on the Challenge Tour, held in 1996 and 1997 in Portugal.

== Winners ==
Year	Winner	Score	To par	Margin of victory	Runner(s)-up	Ref.
1997	(Finland) Anssi Kankkonen	268	−20	Playoff	(Sweden) Fredrik Lindgren (Belgium) Nicolas Vanhootegem	
1996	(England) Gary Marks	270	−18	1 stroke	(France) Jean-Pierre Cixous	
