= Mikael Lundberg =

Swedish professional golfer (born 1973)

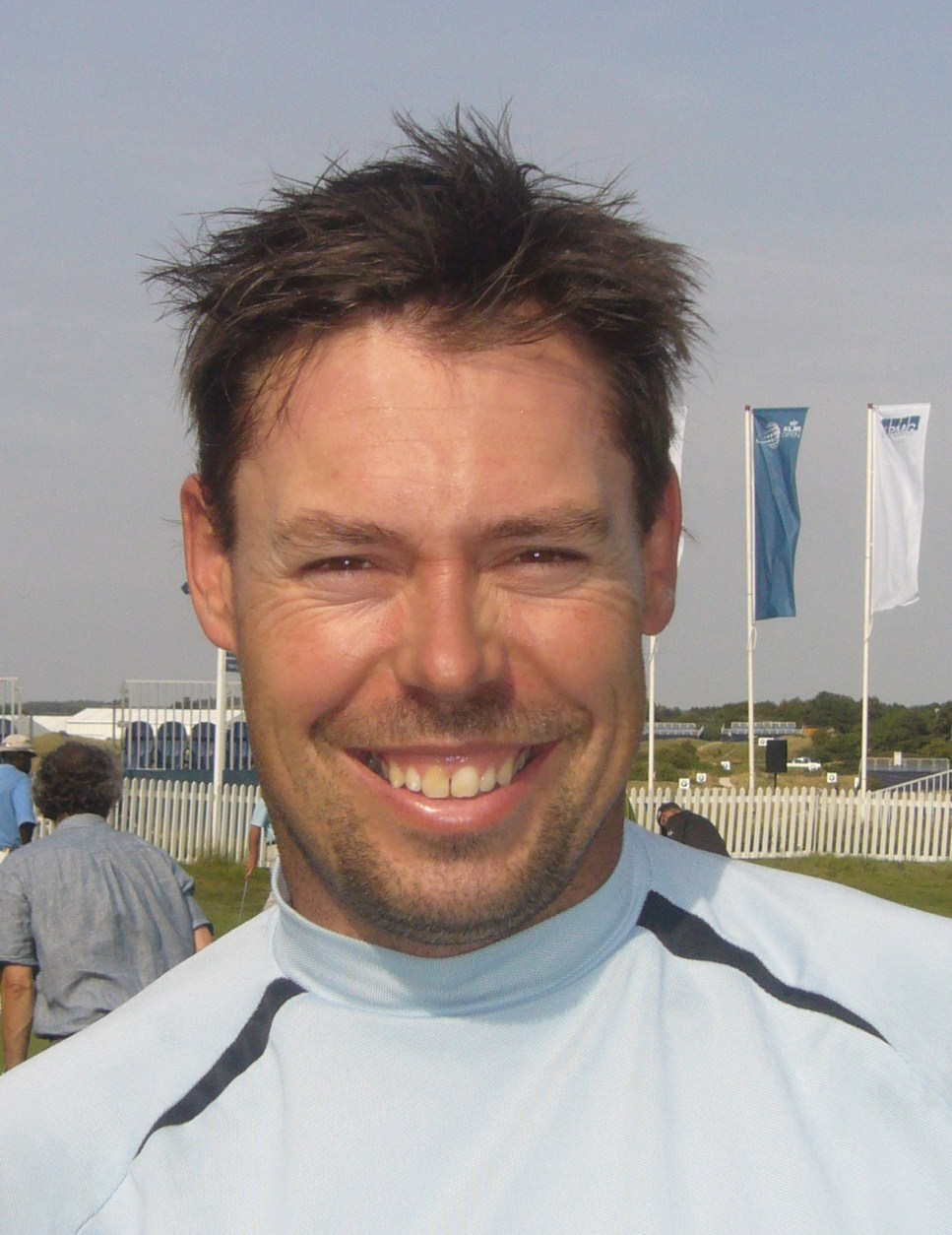

Personal information
- Full name: Lars Mikael Lundberg
- Nationality: Sweden
- Born: 13 August 1973 (age 53) Helsingborg, Sweden
- Height: 1.80 m (5 ft 11 in)
- Weight: 90 kg (198 lb; 14 st 2 lb)
- Children: 4

Career
- Sport: Golf
- Turned professional: 1995
- Current tour: European Senior Tour
- Former tours: European Tour; Challenge Tour; PGA EuroPro Tour; Nordic Golf League; Swedish Golf Tour
- Professional wins: 12

Number of wins by tour
- European Tour: 3
- Challenge Tour: 3
- European Senior Tour: 1
- Other: 6

Best results in major championships
- Masters Tournament: DNP
- PGA Championship: DNP
- U.S. Open: CUT: 2016
- The Open Championship: DNP

Achievements and awards
- PGA EuroPro Tour Order of Merit winner: 2019

Lars Mikael Lundberg (born 13 August 1973) is a Swedish professional golfer. He has won three times on the European Tour.

== Early life and amateur career ==
Lundberg was born in Helsingborg, Sweden. He represented Sweden in the 1994 Eisenhower Trophy.

== Professional career ==
Lundberg turned professional in 1995. He spent several years on the developmental Challenge Tour, where he was victorious in the 1997 Himmerland Open, and won a place on the main European Tour via a fourth-place finish on the 2000 Challenge Tour Rankings. After two steady seasons on tour, a 137th-place finish on the 2003 Order of Merit cost him his European Tour card and he returned to the Challenge Tour in 2004.

Lundberg won back his place on the European Tour by winning the 2005 Cadillac Russian Open, which was an official money event on both tours, but finished outside the top 150 on the 2006 Order of Merit, and returned to the Challenge Tour the next season. Another top ten finish on the Challenge Tour rankings in 2007 saw him regain his European Tour card for 2008, when he won the Russian Open for the second time, giving him a two-year exemption on the main tour.

In 2017 Lundberg won the Lumine Lakes Open, an early-season event on the third-tier Nordic Golf League. In 2019 he won the World Snooker Jessie May Championship and the end-of-season Tour Championships on the PGA EuroPro Tour, as well as the tour's Order of Merit. In April 2021 he won the PGA Catalunya Resort Championship on the Nordic Golf League at the second hole of a sudden-death playoff.

=== European Senior Tour ===
Lundberg joined the European Senior Tour in 2023, and recorded ten top-10 finishes across his first three seasons, including two runner-up finishes in 2025 at the Black Desert NI Legends and Champions UK plc European Senior Masters at La Manga Club. He won his first title at the 2026 Staysure English Legends at Chart Hills, ahead of Stephen Gallacher in second and Lee Westwood in tied third.

== Professional wins (12) ==
=== European Tour wins (3) ===
No.	Date	Tournament	Winning score	Margin of victory	Runner-up
1	14 Aug 2005	Cadillac Russian Open^{1}	−15 (67-68-69-69=273)	Playoff	(England) Andrew Butterfield
2	27 Jul 2008	Inteco Russian Open Golf Championship (2)	−21 (67-64-68-68=267)	2 strokes	(Spain) José Manuel Lara
3	8 Jun 2014	Lyoness Open	−12 (67-68-76-65=276)	Playoff	(Austria) Bernd Wiesberger

^{1}Dual-ranking event with the Challenge Tour

European Tour playoff record (2–0)

No.	Year	Tournament	Opponent	Result
1	2005	Cadillac Russian Open	(England) Andrew Butterfield	Won with birdie on fourth extra hole
2	2014	Lyoness Open	(Austria) Bernd Wiesberger	Won with birdie on first extra hole

=== Challenge Tour wins (3) ===
No.	Date	Tournament	Winning score	Margin of victory	Runner-up
1	1 Jun 1997	Himmerland Open	−7 (69-72-68=209)	5 strokes	(France) Raphaël Eyraud
2	14 Aug 2005	Cadillac Russian Open^{1}	−15 (67-68-69-69=273)	Playoff	(England) Andrew Butterfield
3	20 Oct 2007	Toscana Open Italian Federation Cup	−16 (66-67-62-73=268)	5 strokes	(Republic of Ireland) Stephen Browne

^{1}Dual-ranking event with the European Tour

Challenge Tour playoff record (1–0)

No.	Year	Tournament	Opponent	Result
1	2005	Cadillac Russian Open	(England) Andrew Butterfield	Won with birdie on fourth extra hole

=== PGA EuroPro Tour wins (2) ===
No.	Date	Tournament	Winning score	Margin of victory	Runner(s)-up
1	7 Jun 2019	World Snooker Championship	−7 (68-71-70=209)	1 stroke	(England) James Adams, (England) Alfie Plant
2	1 Nov 2019	Tour Championships	−10 (64-73-69=206)	Playoff	(England) James Allan

=== Nordic Golf League wins (2) ===
No.	Date	Tournament	Winning score	Margin of victory	Runner(s)-up
1	27 Feb 2017	Lumine Lakes Open	−14 (63-69-68=200)	1 stroke	(Sweden) Christopher Feldborg Nielsen
2	20 Apr 2021	PGA Catalunya Resort Championship	−10 (69-66-70=205)	Playoff	(Sweden) Jesper Kennegård, (Finland) Lauri Ruuska

=== Swedish Golf Tour wins (1) ===
No.	Date	Tournament	Winning score	Margin of victory	Runner-up
1	15 Jun 1997	Husqvarna Open	−11 (66-66-67=199)	1 stroke	(Sweden) Patrik Sjöland

=== Other wins (1) ===
- 1995 Slovenian Open

=== European Senior Tour wins (1) ===
No.	Date	Tournament	Winning score	Margin of victory	Runner-up
1	30 Aug 2026	Staysure English Legends	−12 (67-65-72=204)	2 strokes	(Scotland) Stephen Gallacher

== Team appearances ==
Amateur

- European Boys' Team Championship (representing Sweden): 1991 (winners)
- European Youths' Team Championship: 1992 (winners), 1994
- European Amateur Team Championship (representing Sweden): 1993
- Eisenhower Trophy (representing Sweden): 1994

== See also ==
- 2007 Challenge Tour graduates
- 2011 European Tour Qualifying School graduates
- 2012 European Tour Qualifying School graduates
- 2013 European Tour Qualifying School graduates
