= 1996 Challenge Tour =

Golf tour season

1996 Challenge Tour season
- Duration: 22 February 1996 – 24 October 1996
- Number of official events: 32
- Most wins: (Sweden) Dennis Edlund (2) (Spain) Ignacio Feliu (2) (Sweden) Adam Mednick (2) (Finland) Kalle Väinölä (2) (Germany) Erol Şimşek (2)
- Rankings: (England) Ian Garbutt

The 1996 Challenge Tour was the eighth season of the Challenge Tour, the official development tour to the European Tour.

== Schedule ==
The following table lists official events during the 1996 season.

Date	Tournament	Host country	Purse (£)	Winner (Note: The number in brackets after each winner's name is the number of Challenge Tour events they had won up to and including that tournament. This information is only shown for Challenge Tour members. It is rare for someone to accumulate many wins on the Challenge Tour as success at this level usually leads to promotion to the European Tour.)	Notes
25 Feb	Kenya Open	Kenya	65,000	(Scotland) Mike Miller (1)	
10 Mar	Open de Côte d'Ivoire	Ivory Coast	70,000	(Italy) Massimo Florioli (1)	
14 Apr	Is Molas Challenge	Italy	Lit 80,000,000	(England) Simon Burnell (1)	New tournament
21 Apr	Le Pavoniere Challenge	Italy	Lit 80,000,000	(Finland) Kalle Väinölä (1)	New tournament
27 Apr	Alianca UAP Challenger	Portugal	50,000	(England) Gary Marks (1)	New tournament
5 May	Canarias Challenge	Spain	Pta 12,000,000	(England) Robert Lee (1)	
19 May	Open de Dijon	France	45,000	(Spain) Francisco Cea (1)	
26 May	Club Med Open	Italy	Lit 140,000,000	(Spain) Ignacio Feliu (2)	
2 Jun	SIAB Open	Sweden	35,000	(Finland) Kalle Väinölä (2)	
9 Jun	KB Golf Challenge	Czech Republic	65,000	(Sweden) Joakim Rask (2)	
9 Jun	Himmerland Open	Denmark	35,000	(Sweden) Niklas Diethelm (1)	
23 Jun	Team Erhverv Danish Open	Denmark	70,000	(Sweden) Robert Jonsson (1)	
23 Jun	Open dei Tessali	Italy	Lit 100,000,000	(New Zealand) Stephen Scahill (1)	
30 Jun	Audi Quattro Trophy	Germany	72,000	(Germany) Erol Şimşek (1)	
7 Jul	Open des Volcans	France	60,000	(England) Andrew Sandywell (2)	
13 Jul	Gosen Challenge	England	35,000	(England) Greg Owen (1)	New tournament
14 Jul	Volvo Finnish Open	Finland	35,000	(Sweden) Björn Bäck (1)	
28 Jul	Interlaken Open	Switzerland	CHF 100,000	(England) Van Phillips (1)	
4 Aug	English Challenge Tour Championship	England	65,000	(Sweden) Dennis Edlund (3)	
10 Aug	Rolex Trophy Pro-Am	Switzerland	CHF 100,000	(Sweden) Dennis Edlund (4)	
18 Aug	Karsten Ping Norwegian Open	Norway	60,000	(Spain) Ignacio Feliu (3)	
25 Aug	Dutch Challenge	Netherlands	60,000	(Australia) Mathew Goggin (1)	
25 Aug	Toyota Danish PGA Championship	Denmark	40,000	(Sweden) Adam Mednick (4)	
1 Sep	Kentab/RBG Open	Sweden	40,000	(Sweden) Max Anglert (1)	
8 Sep	Russian Open	Russia	65,000	(England) Carl Watts (2)	New to Challenge Tour
8 Sep	SM Match Play	Sweden	50,000	(Sweden) Adam Mednick (5)	
15 Sep	Perrier European Pro-Am	Belgium	55,000	(United States) Kevin Carissimi (1)	
21 Sep	Eulen Open Galea	Spain	72,000	(Spain) José Antonio Sota (1)	
28 Sep	Modena Classic Open	Italy	35,000	(England) Lee S. James (1)	New tournament
29 Sep	Telia InfoMedia Grand Prix	Sweden	SKr 1,000,000	(England) Scott Watson (1)	
6 Oct	Bank Pekao Polish Open	Poland	40,000	(Germany) Erol Şimşek (2)	New to Challenge Tour
20 Oct	UAP Grand Final	Portugal	65,000	(England) Ian Garbutt (1)	Tour Championship

=== Unofficial events ===
The following events were sanctioned by the Challenge Tour, but did not carry official money, wins were still official however.

Date	Tournament	Host country	Purse (£)	Winner	Notes
30 Jun	Memorial Olivier Barras	Switzerland	CHF 75,000	(Spain) Juan Quirós (1)	
7 Jul	Neuchâtel Open Golf Trophy	Switzerland	CHF 75,000	(Italy) Federico Bisazza (1)	

== Rankings ==
The rankings were based on prize money won during the season, calculated in Pound sterling. The top 15 players on the rankings earned status to play on the 1997 European Tour.

Rank	Player	Prize money (£)
1	(England) Ian Garbutt	37,661
2	(Sweden) Dennis Edlund	34,286
3	(England) Robert Lee	33,990
4	(England) Andrew Sandywell	33,098
5	(Italy) Massimo Florioli	32,708

== See also ==
- 1996 Swedish Golf Tour
