= Albarella International Open =

Tournament information
- Location: Venice, Italy
- Established: 1998
- Course: Albarella Golf Club
- Par: 72
- Tour: Challenge Tour
- Format: Stroke play
- Prize fund: £40,000
- Month played: May
- Final year: 1998

Tournament record score
- Aggregate: 267 Fredrik Lindgren (1998)
- To par: −21 as above

Final champion
- (Sweden) Fredrik Lindgren
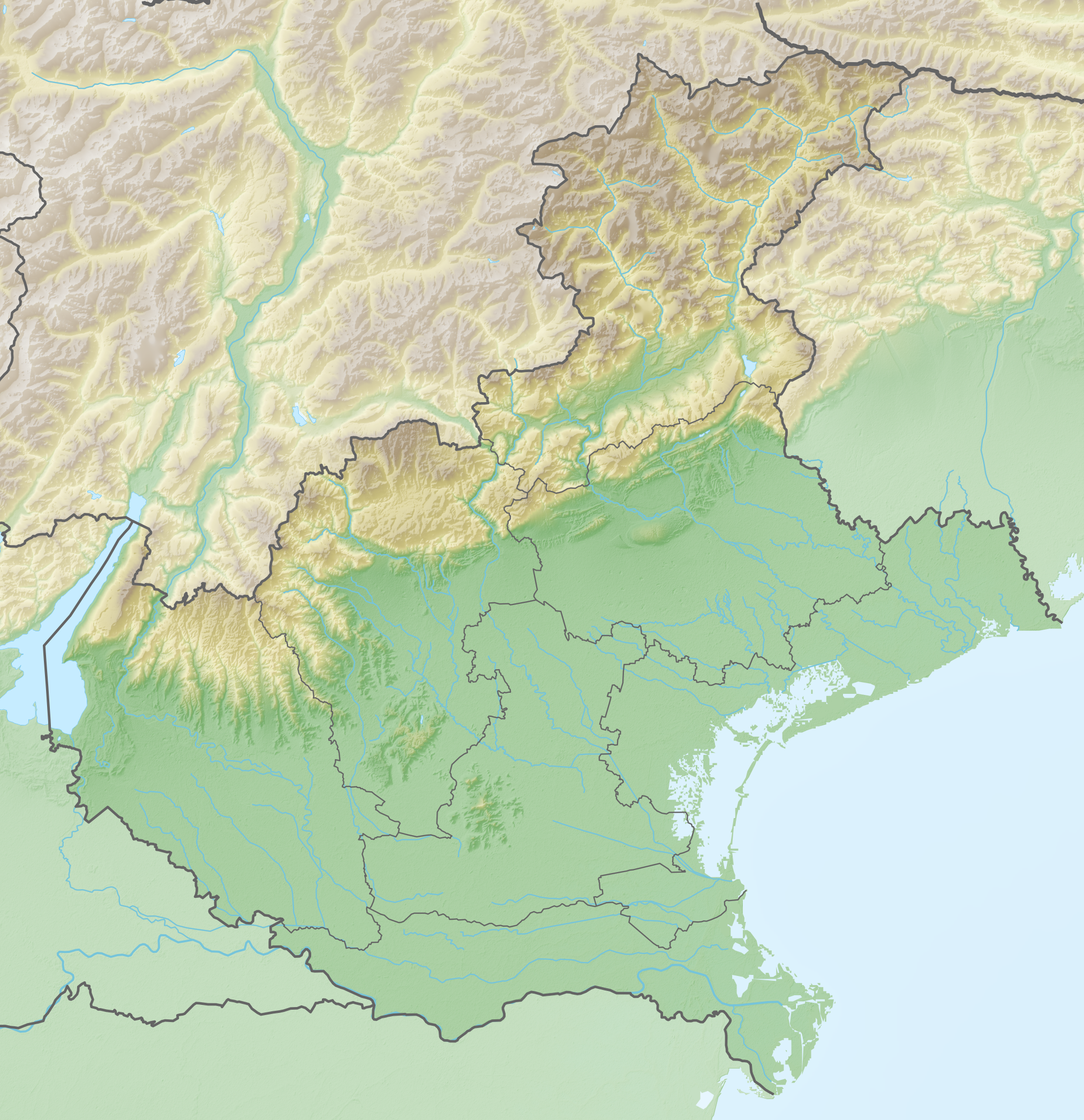
- Location in Italy Location in Veneto

The Albarella International Open was a golf tournament on the Challenge Tour, played in Italy. It was held 1998 at Albarella GC in Venice.

== Winners ==
Year	Winner	Score	To par	Margin of victory	Runners-up	Ref.
1998	(Sweden) Fredrik Lindgren	267	−21	3 strokes	(Australia) Mathew Goggin (Argentina) Ricardo González	
