= Kalle Väinölä =

Finnish professional golfer (born 1971)

Personal information
- Nationality: Finland
- Born: 15 December 1971 (age 54) Lahti, Finland
- Height: 1.83 m (6 ft 0 in)

Career
- Sport: Golf
- Turned professional: 1994
- Former tours: European Tour; Challenge Tour; Swedish Golf Tour
- Professional wins: 2

Number of wins by tour
- Challenge Tour: 2

Kalle Väinölä (born 15 December 1971) is a retired Finnish professional golfer who played on the Challenge Tour and European Tour 1995–2004.

== Career ==
Väinölä's family moved to a new house adjacent to a golf course when he was two years old, and he took up the game when he was four. An all-round sportsman, he gave up golf when he was 13 to concentrate on tennis but he returned to the game at 17 and went on to play for his native Finland, winning the Finnish Amateur, the Greek Open Amateur and the European Club Cup. In 1992, he won the EGA Trophy representing continental Europe along with eight players including Thomas Bjørn and Niclas Fasth, against a Great Britain & Ireland team that included Pádraig Harrington.

Väinölä turned professional in 1994 and won a Swedish Golf Tour card, which in turn brought him a Challenge Tour ranking. On the 1995 Challenge Tour, he was runner-up at the Eulen Open Galea in Spain and again at the Siab Open, behind compatriot Anssi Kankkonen. The following year he won the Siab Open and also the La Pavoniere Challenge, finishing within the top 15 on the 1996 Challenge Tour rankings to graduate to the European Tour. On the 1997 European Tour, his best finish was T5 in the Benson & Hedges International Open at the Oxfordshire Golf Club, seven strokes behind winner Bernhard Langer. As one of Finland's few playing professionals on the European Tour, he had no difficulty in attracting sponsors.

Väinölä represented Finland twice at the World Cup, in 1995 together with Anssi Kankkonen and in 2000 with Mikael Piltz.

== Professional wins (2) ==
=== Challenge Tour wins (2) ===
No.	Date	Tournament	Winning score	Margin of victory	Runner-up
1	21 Apr 1996	La Pavoniere Challenge	−16 (69-68-67-68=272)	2 strokes	(Sweden) Mårten Olander
2	2 Jun 1996	SIAB Open	−20 (64-63-70-71=268)	Playoff	(Sweden) Adam Mednick

Challenge Tour playoff record (1–0)

No.	Year	Tournament	Opponent	Result
1	1996	SIAB Open	(Sweden) Adam Mednick	Won with birdie on second extra hole

== Team appearances ==
Amateur

- EGA Trophy (representing continental Europe): 1992 (winners)

Professional

- World Cup (representing Finland): 1995, 2000

== See also ==
- 1996 Challenge Tour graduates
