= Albarelli =

Albarelli is an Italian surname, plural of albarello. Notable people with the surname include:

- Fabio Albarelli (1943–1995), Italian competitive sailor
- Giacomo Albarelli, Italian painter

== See also ==
- Albarello (surname)
