= 1997 Challenge Tour =

Golf tour season

1997 Challenge Tour season
- Duration: 5 March 1997 – 26 October 1997
- Number of official events: 35 (Note: A further two tournaments were scheduled but were either cancelled or abandoned.)
- Most wins: (England) Andrew Collison (2) (Sweden) Fredrik Henge (2) (France) Raphaël Jacquelin (2) (Finland) Anssi Kankkonen (2) (Italy) Michele Reale (2) (Germany) Erol Şimşek (2)
- Rankings: (Italy) Michele Reale

The 1997 Challenge Tour was the ninth season of the Challenge Tour, the official development tour to the European Tour.

== Schedule ==
The following table lists official events during the 1997 season.

Date	Tournament	Host country	Purse (£)	Winner (Note: The number in brackets after each winner's name is the number of Challenge Tour events they had won up to and including that tournament. This information is only shown for Challenge Tour members. It is rare for someone to accumulate many wins on the Challenge Tour as success at this level usually leads to promotion to the European Tour.)	Notes
8 Mar	Open de Côte d'Ivoire	Ivory Coast	70,000	(Denmark) Knud Storgaard (1)	
16 Mar	Lonrho Kenya Open	Kenya	65,000	(Argentina) Jorge Berendt (1)	
13 Apr	Is Molas Challenge	Italy	35,000	(England) Andrew Collison (2)	
19 Apr	Le Pavoniere Supercal Challenge	Italy	35,000	(England) Andrew Collison (3)	
27 Apr	Alianca UAP Challenger	France	55,000	(Finland) Anssi Kankkonen (2)	
4 May	Canarias Challenge	Spain	55,000	(Italy) Michele Reale (1)	
18 May	Modena Classic Open	Italy	35,000	(Spain) Jesús María Arruti (2)	
25 May	Matchmaker Austrian Open	Austria	50,000	(Germany) Erol Şimşek (3)	New to Challenge Tour
1 Jun	Himmerland Open	Denmark	35,000	(Sweden) Mikael Lundberg (1)	
8 Jun	KB Golf Challenge	Czech Republic	55,000	(Germany) Alex Čejka (3)	
8 Jun	SIAB Open	Sweden	35,000	(Sweden) Joakim Rask (3)	
22 Jun	Team Erhverv Danish Open	Denmark	80,000	(England) David Lynn (1)	
29 Jun	Audi Quattro Trophy	Germany	72,000	(England) David A. Russell (1)	
29 Jun	Open dei Tessali	Italy	35,000	(Spain) Ivó Giner (1)	
6 Jul	Open des Volcans	France	50,000	(Wales) Mark Litton (4)	
7 Jul	Neuchâtel Open	Switzerland	35,000	(Germany) Erol Şimşek (4)	
13 Jul	Volvo Finnish Open	Finland	35,000	(Denmark) Søren Kjeldsen (1)	
20 Jul	Rolex Trophy Pro-Am	Switzerland	50,000	(Finland) Anssi Kankkonen (3)	
~~27 Jul~~	Interlaken Open	Switzerland	–	Abandoned (Note: Tournament abandoned due to persistent bad weather.)	
27 Jul	BTC Slovenian Open	Slovenia	40,000	(Sweden) Kalle Brink (1)	New tournament
3 Aug	Klassis Turkish Open	Turkey	85,000	(Wales) Bradley Dredge (1)	New tournament
10 Aug	Challenge Tour Championship	England	70,000	(Australia) Greg Chalmers (1)	
24 Aug	Netcom Norwegian Open	Norway	45,000	(Switzerland) Demitri Bieri (1)	
31 Aug	Steelcover Dutch Challenge	Netherlands	60,000	(France) Raphaël Jacquelin (2)	
25 Aug	Toyota Danish PGA Championship	Denmark	40,000	(Sweden) Fredrik Henge (1)	
6 Sep	Sovereign Russian Open	Russia	90,000	(Italy) Michele Reale (2)	
7 Sep	Öhrlings Swedish Matchplay	Sweden	50,000	(United States) Gregory Garbero (1)	
14 Sep	Perrier European Pro-Am	Belgium	65,000	(United States) Craig Hainline (1)	
21 Sep	Eulen Open Galea	Spain	65,000	(England) Warren Bennett (2)	
26 Sep	BPGT Challenge	England	35,000	(France) Olivier Edmond (1)	
~~28 Sep~~	Polish Open	Poland	–	Cancelled	
5 Oct	Telia InfoMedia Grand Prix	Sweden	80,000	(Sweden) Fredrik Henge (2)	
11 Oct	San Paolo Vita Open	Italy	45,000	(Australia) Mathew Goggin (2)	
19 Oct	Estoril Challenge	Portugal	85,000	(Spain) José Manuel Carriles (1)	New tournament
26 Oct	Estoril Grand Final	Portugal	70,000	(France) Nicolas Joakimides (1)	Tour Championship

=== Unofficial events ===
The following events were sanctioned by the Challenge Tour, but did not carry official money, wins were still official however.

Date	Tournament	Host country	Purse (£)	Winner	Notes
22 Jun	Memorial Olivier Barras	Switzerland	40,000	(France) Raphaël Jacquelin (1)	

== Rankings ==
The rankings were based on prize money won during the season, calculated in Pound sterling. The top 15 players on the rankings earned status to play on the 1998 European Tour.

Rank	Player	Prize money (£)
1	(Italy) Michele Reale	51,679
2	(Sweden) Kalle Brink	36,112
3	(Australia) Greg Chalmers	35,267
4	(France) Raphaël Jacquelin	34,537
5	(Finland) Anssi Kankkonen	32,128

== See also ==
- 1997 Swedish Golf Tour
