= Himmerland Open =

Tournament information
- Location: Farsø, Denmark
- Established: 1994
- Courses: Himmerland Golf & Spa Resort
- Par: 72
- Tour: Challenge Tour
- Format: Stroke play
- Prize fund: £40,000
- Month played: August
- Final year: 1998

Tournament record score
- Aggregate: 205 Niklas Diethelm (1996); 205 Knud Storgaard (1996)
- To par: −11 as above

Final champion
- (Denmark) Søren Hansen
- Location in Denmark

The Himmerland Open was a golf tournament on the Challenge Tour, played in Denmark. It was held from 1994 to 1998 at Himmerland Golf & Spa Resort in Farsø.

== Winners ==
| Year | Winner | Score | To par | Margin of victory | Runner(s)-up | Ref. |
Navision Open Golf Championship
| 1998 | (Denmark) Søren Hansen | 206 | −10 | Playoff | (Denmark) René Budde (Scotland) Euan Little | |
Himmerland Open
| 1997 | (Sweden) Mikael Lundberg | 209 | −7 | 5 strokes | (France) Raphaël Eyraud | |
| 1996 | (Sweden) Niklas Diethelm | 205 | −11 | Playoff | (Denmark) Knud Storgaard | |
| 1995 | (Denmark) Thomas Bjørn | 216 | E | Playoff | (Belgium) Nicolas Vanhootegem (Finland) Anssi Kankkonen | |
| 1994 | (England) Michael Archer | 209 | −7 | Playoff | (Sweden) Mats Hallberg | |

== See also ==
- Made in Denmark – European Tour tournament played on the same course from 2014 to 2017 and 2019.
