= Michele Reale =

Italian professional golfer (born 1971)

Personal information
- Full name: Michele Reale
- Nationality: Italy
- Born: 14 June 1971 (age 55) Biella, Italy
- Height: 1.76 m (5 ft 9 in)
- Weight: 78 kg (172 lb; 12.3 st)

Career
- Sport: Golf
- Turned professional: 1992
- Former tours: European Tour; Challenge Tour
- Professional wins: 5

Number of wins by tour
- Challenge Tour: 2
- Other: 3

Achievements and awards
- Challenge Tour Rankings winner: 1997

Michele Reale (born 14 June 1971) is an Italian professional golfer.

== Early life and amateur career ==
Reale was born in Biella, Piedmont in 1971. He won the 1991 Italian Under 20 Championship.

== Professional career ==
Reale turned professional in 1992. Reale played in three tournaments on the second-tier European Challenge Tour in 1992, before making his first attempt at qualifying for the top level European Tour. He got through to the final stage of qualifying school, but had to settle for a place on the second tier for 1993. He failed to graduate through qualifying school in each of the next four years, but his performances on the Challenge Tour steadily improved, culminating in 1997 when he won twice on his way to the top of the rankings, and a place on the European Tour for 1998.

Unfortunately, during his rookie season on the European Tour, Reale contracted measles, and wound up back at qualifying school at the end of the year. This time he was successful, but in 1999 again enjoyed a fruitless season at the highest level, and returned to the Challenge Tour for 2000. He finished that season in 5th place on the rankings, to gain promotion back to the European Tour. He has since spent most of his career on the Challenge Tour, visiting qualifying school every year, with success in 2001 and 2005, but has failed to improve on his début showing of 120th on the European Tour Order of Merit.

== Professional wins (5) ==
=== Challenge Tour wins (2) ===
No.	Date	Tournament	Winning score	Margin of victory	Runner-up
1	4 May 1997	Canarias Challenge	−16 (67-69-65-67=268)	Playoff	(England) Scott Watson
2	6 Sep 1997	Sovereign Russian Open	−8 (73-68-68-71=280)	Playoff	(Germany) Heinz-Peter Thül

Challenge Tour playoff record (2–1)

No.	Year	Tournament	Opponent	Result
1	1993	Memorial Olivier Barras	(Spain) Francisco Valera (a)	Lost to par on first extra hole
2	1997	Canarias Challenge	(England) Scott Watson	Won with birdie on first extra hole
3	1997	Sovereign Russian Open	(Germany) Heinz-Peter Thül	Won with par on second extra hole

=== Other wins (3) ===
- 1991 Italian Under 20 Championship (as an amateur)
- 1992 Italian PGA Championship
- 1994 Italian Under 25 Championship

== Team appearances ==
Amateur

- European Youths' Team Championship (representing Italy): 1990 (winners)

== See also ==
- 2005 European Tour Qualifying School graduates
