= Alexander Knappe =

German professional golfer

Personal information
- Nationality: Germany
- Born: 1 March 1989 (age 37) Brilon, Germany
- Height: 1.89 m (6 ft 2 in)
- Weight: 80 kg (180 lb; 13 st)

Career
- Sport: Golf
- College: Texas Christian University
- Turned professional: 2011
- Current tour: European Tour
- Former tours: Sunshine Tour; Challenge Tour; Pro Golf Tour
- Professional wins: 7

Number of wins by tour
- Sunshine Tour: 1
- Challenge Tour: 4
- Other: 3

Alexander Knappe (born 1 March 1989) is a German professional golfer.

Knappe was born in Brilon, Germany. He played one year of college golf at Texas Christian University.

Knappe turned professional in 2011 and has played on the Pro Golf Tour, Challenge Tour and Sunshine Tour. He has won three times on the Pro Golf Tour and four times on the Challenge Tour.

== Amateur wins ==
- 2010 German Amateur Match Play Championship

== Professional wins (7) ==
=== Sunshine Tour wins (1) ===
No.	Date	Tournament	Winning score	Margin of victory	Runner-up
1	13 Feb 2022	Dimension Data Pro-Am^{1}	−23 (65-67-66-68=266)	1 stroke	(South Africa) Dean Burmester

^{1}Co-sanctioned by the Challenge Tour

=== Challenge Tour wins (4) ===
No.	Date	Tournament	Winning score	Margin of victory	Runner(s)-up
1	5 Jun 2016	Swiss Challenge	−12 (67-70-67-68=272)	1 stroke	(England) Paul Howard, (Norway) Espen Kofstad
2	16 Oct 2016	Hainan Open	−9 (68-67=135) (Note: Shortened to 18/36 holes due to weather.)	2 strokes	(Spain) Pep Anglès
3	13 Feb 2022	Dimension Data Pro-Am^{1}	−23 (65-67-66-68=266)	1 stroke	(South Africa) Dean Burmester
4	4 Sep 2022	B-NL Challenge Trophy	−20 (68-66-66-68=268)	1 stroke	(Sweden) Mikael Lindberg

^{1}Co-sanctioned by the Sunshine Tour

=== Pro Golf Tour wins (3) ===
No.	Date	Tournament	Winning score	Margin of victory	Runner(s)-up
1	22 Apr 2011	Open Mogador	−10 (70-68-68=206)	1 stroke	(Germany) Maximilian Glauert, (Portugal) José-Filipe Lima, (Netherlands) Reinier Saxton, (Germany) Maximilian Tschinkel
2	22 Jan 2014	Sueno Dunes Classic	−8 (68-69-62=199)	Playoff	(Morocco) Faycal Serghini
3	27 May 2014	Adamstal Open	−5 (65)	Playoff	(Austria) Sebastian Wittmann (a)

== Team appearances ==
- European Boys' Team Championship (representing Germany): 2006, 2007
- Eisenhower Trophy (representing Germany): 2008
- European Amateur Team Championship (representing Germany): 2008, 2009, 2010

== See also ==
- 2016 Challenge Tour graduates
- 2022 Challenge Tour graduates
- List of golfers with most Challenge Tour wins
