= Lucas Bjerregaard =

Danish professional golfer (born 1991)

Personal information
- Full name: Lucas Justra Bjerregaard
- Nationality: Denmark
- Born: 14 August 1991 (age 35) Frederikshavn, Denmark
- Height: 1.88 m (6 ft 2 in)
- Weight: 83 kg (183 lb; 13.1 st)
- Life partner: Henriette Friis
- Children: 2

Career
- Sport: Golf
- Turned professional: 2011
- Current tours: European Tour; Asian Tour
- Former tours: PGA Tour; Challenge Tour; Nordic Golf League
- Professional wins: 6
- Highest ranking: 42 (5 May 2019)

Number of wins by tour
- European Tour: 2
- Other: 4

Best results in major championships
- Masters Tournament: T21: 2019
- PGA Championship: T16: 2019
- U.S. Open: T40: 2014
- The Open Championship: T16: 2019

Achievements and awards
- Danish Golf Tour Order of Merit winner: 2012
- Nordic Golf League Order of Merit winner: 2012

Lucas Justra Bjerregaard (born 14 August 1991) is a Danish professional golfer who plays the European Tour. In May 2017, playing with Thorbjørn Olesen, they won the inaugural GolfSixes, an unofficial pairs event on the European Tour. Later that year, in September, he had his first solo win on the European Tour, the Portugal Masters. In October 2018, Bjerregaard won the Alfred Dunhill Links Championship for his second European Tour victory.

== Amateur career ==
Bjerregaard played on the Continental Europe team in the 2009 Jacques Léglise Trophy. He played in the Eisenhower Trophy for Denmark in 2008 and 2010; the 2010 team, with Joachim B. Hansen and Morten Ørum Madsen finished second to France by one stroke. Bjerregaard won the Danish Open Amateur in 2007 and 2008, and the European Amateur in 2010. Bjerregaard committed to play golf at Florida State University, but turned pro before entering college.

== Professional career ==
Bjerregaard turned professional in 2011. In 2012, he won the Order of Merit on the Nordic Golf League. He won three Nordic Golf League events between 2011 and 2013.

Bjerregaard played on the Challenge Tour in 2013, making 14 cuts in 18 events. His best finish was second place at the National Bank of Oman Golf Classic. He finished 34th in the Challenge Tour rankings. He then competed in the European Tour Qualifying School and finished T-17 to earn his European Tour card for 2014.

On the European Tour in 2014, he made 17 cuts in 26 events, including three top-10 finishes. He finished 90th in the Race to Dubai rankings and retained his card for 2015. At the 2014 U.S. Open he finished in a tie for 40th place.

Bjerregaard earned his first European Tour win at the 2017 Portugal Masters.

On 7 October 2018, Bjerregaard won the Alfred Dunhill Links Championship at the Old Course at St Andrews beating Tommy Fleetwood and Tyrrell Hatton by one stroke and winning €695,759 for his second European Tour victory.

At the 2019 WGC-Dell Technologies Match Play, having defeated 2016 Open champion Henrik Stenson earlier in the day, Bjerregaard scored a massive upset victory over Tiger Woods 1 up. The following day, losses to Matt Kuchar and Francesco Molinari placed Bjerregaard 4th, his best finish in a World Golf Championships event.

== Amateur wins ==
- 2007 Danish Open Amateur
- 2008 Danish Open Amateur
- 2010 European Amateur, Toyota Junior World Cup

== Professional wins (6) ==
=== European Tour wins (2) ===
No.	Date	Tournament	Winning score	Margin of victory	Runner(s)-up
1	24 Sep 2017	Portugal Masters	−20 (66-65-68-65=264)	4 strokes	(Scotland) Marc Warren
2	7 Oct 2018	Alfred Dunhill Links Championship	−15 (70-65-71-67=273)	1 stroke	(England) Tommy Fleetwood, (England) Tyrrell Hatton

European Tour playoff record (0–1)

No.	Year	Tournament	Opponent	Result
1	2018	Omega European Masters	(England) Matt Fitzpatrick	Lost to birdie on first extra hole

=== Nordic Golf League wins (3) ===
No.	Date	Tournament	Winning score	Margin of victory	Runner(s)-up
1	26 May 2012	Söderby Masters	−12 (68-72-67=207)	1 stroke	(Sweden) Kristoffer Broberg, (Sweden) Pontus Leijon
2	11 Aug 2012	Isaberg Open	−10 (68-69-69=206)	2 strokes	(Sweden) Adam Ström
3	22 Mar 2013	ECCO Spanish Open	−8 (72-66-71=209)	Playoff	(Finland) Tapio Pulkkanen

=== Other wins (1) ===
No.	Date	Tournament	Winning score	Margin of victory	Runners-up
1	7 May 2017	GolfSixes (with (Denmark) Thorbjørn Olesen)	3–1		Australia − Sam Brazel and Scott Hend

== Results in major championships ==
Tournament	2011	2012	2013	2014	2015	2016	2017	2018
Masters Tournament								
U.S. Open				T40	CUT			
The Open Championship	CUT							
PGA Championship								

Tournament	2019
Masters Tournament	T21
PGA Championship	T16
U.S. Open	CUT
The Open Championship	T16

Did not play

CUT = missed the half-way cut
"T" = tied for place

== Results in The Players Championship ==
Tournament	2019
The Players Championship	T30

"T" indicates a tie for a place

== Results in World Golf Championships ==
Tournament	2018	2019
Championship		69
Match Play		4
Invitational		T51
Champions	T69	

Top 10
Did not play

"T" = Tied

== Team appearances ==
Amateur

- European Boys' Team Championship (representing Denmark): 2006, 2007 (winners), 2008, 2009 (winners)
- Jacques Léglise Trophy (representing Continental Europe): 2009
- Eisenhower Trophy (representing Denmark): 2008, 2010
- European Amateur Team Championship (representing Denmark): 2010, 2011

== See also ==
- 2013 European Tour Qualifying School graduates
- 2024 Challenge Tour graduates
