= Pedro Figueiredo =

Portuguese professional golfer

Personal information
- Nickname: Figgy
- Nationality: Portugal
- Born: 13 June 1991 (age 35) Paris, France

Career
- Sport: Golf
- College: UCLA
- Turned professional: 2013
- Current tour: European Tour
- Former tour: Challenge Tour

Number of wins by tour
- Challenge Tour: 1

Pedro Figueiredo (born 13 June 1991) is a Portuguese professional golfer. In June 2018 won the KPMG Trophy on the Challenge Tour.

== Amateur career ==
Figueiredo had a successful amateur career. At the age of 12, he represented his country at the 2003 European Boys' Team Championship for the first of seven appearances. He won the Boys Amateur Championship and Irish Amateur Open Championship in 2008.

Figueiredo played college golf at the UCLA where he won three events. He turned professional in mid-2013 after competing in the 2013 Palmer Cup.

== Professional career ==
Figueiredo played on the Challenge Tour from 2013 to 2016 with little success. In 2017 he played on the Pro Golf Tour. Although he did not win any tournaments, he had a consistent season with three runners-up finishes and 10 other top-10 finishes to end the season fourth in the Order of Merit and earn a place on the 2018 Challenge Tour.

In June 2018, Figueiredo won the KPMG Trophy in Belgium, beating Anton Karlsson and Stuart Manley in a playoff, with a birdie at the first extra hole. Two weeks later he finished in third place in the SSE Scottish Hydro Challenge. He ended the season in 15th place in the Order of Merit, the last place to earn a card on the 2019 European Tour. He holed a 12-foot birdie at the final hole of the Challenge Tour Grand Final to finish 600 euros ahead of Tom Murray.

== Amateur wins ==
This list in incomplete

- 2008 Boys Amateur Championship, Irish Amateur Open Championship
- 2011 Firestone Grill Cal Poly Invitational
- 2013 Prestige at PGA West, Western Intercollegiate

== Professional wins (1) ==
=== Challenge Tour wins (1) ===
No.	Date	Tournament	Winning score	Margin of victory	Runners-up
1	10 Jun 2018	KPMG Trophy	−22 (63-68-67-64=262)	Playoff	(Sweden) Anton Karlsson, (Wales) Stuart Manley

Challenge Tour playoff record (1–0)

No.	Year	Tournament	Opponents	Result
1	2018	KPMG Trophy	(Sweden) Anton Karlsson, (Wales) Stuart Manley	Won with birdie on first extra hole

== Team appearances ==
Amateur

- European Boys' Team Championship (representing Portugal): 2003, 2004, 2005, 2006 2007, 2008, 2009
- European Amateur Team Championship (representing Portugal): 2005, 2007, 2008, 2009, 2010, 2011, 2013
- Jacques Léglise Trophy (representing the Continent of Europe): 2006 (winners), 2007, 2009
- Eisenhower Trophy (representing Portugal): 2006, 2008, 2010, 2012
- Junior Ryder Cup (representing Europe): 2006 (tie)
- Palmer Cup (representing Europe): 2013

== See also ==
- 2018 Challenge Tour graduates
- 2019 European Tour Qualifying School graduates
- 2022 European Tour Qualifying School graduates
- 2023 European Tour Qualifying School graduates
