= Pontus Widegren =

Swedish professional golfer

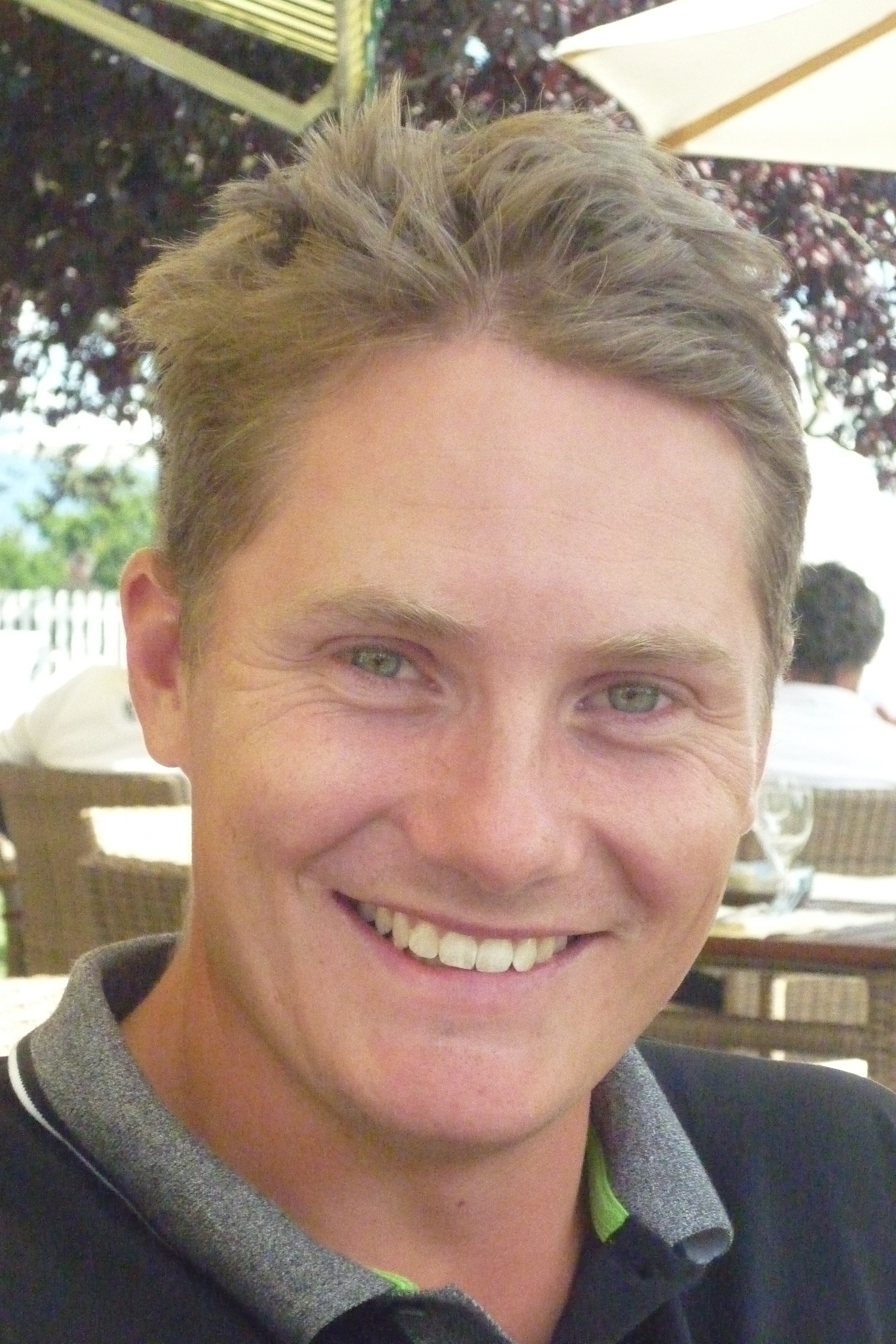
- Widegren in 2014

Personal information
- Nationality: Sweden
- Born: 14 October 1990 (age 36) Danderyd, Sweden
- Height: 1.74 m (5 ft 9 in)
- Weight: 76 kg (168 lb; 12.0 st)

Career
- Sport: Golf
- College: University of California, Los Angeles
- Turned professional: 2013
- Former tours: European Tour; Challenge Tour; Swedish Golf Tour

Achievements and awards
- AJGA Jerry Cole Sportsmanship Award: 2008

Pontus Widegren (born 14 October 1990) is a Swedish professional golfer and European Tour player.

== Amateur career ==
Widegren has played golf since he was seven and began competing when he was 12. At 13, he became the youngest Club Champion at Stockholm Golf Club. He ranked as high as sixth on the AJGA circuit where he was runner-up at the 2008 Junior Players Championship. In November 2008, he was awarded the AJGA Jerry Cole Sportsmanship Award for his "respect for fellow players, as well as tournament staff and volunteers."

Widegren became a member of the Swedish National Team in 2005. He won the 2007 Junior Golf World Cup in Japan with scores of 68-65-74-68=275, and won the silver in 2006 and 2008. He also won the bronze at the 2008 Eisenhower Trophy in Australia with Jesper Kennegård and Henrik Norlander. In 2010, he won the St Andrews Trophy with the Continental European team.

Individually, he lost the final of the 2006 French International Boys Championship to Sean Einhaus 1 up. Widegren won the 2009 Swedish Junior Strokeplay Championship with scores of 76-65-68-72=281 (–9) following a play-off. In 2012, he finished 4th at the European Amateur in Ireland.

Widegren attended the University of California, Los Angeles 2009–13 and played for the UCLA Bruins men's golf team, where he won twice and was named All-American. He played in four consecutive Palmer Cups, recording 3-1-0 in matches against U.S. competition in his first appearance.

== Professional career ==
Widegren turned professional after he graduated in 2013 and joined the Challenge Tour. He finished runner-up at the 2013 Norwegian Challenge, and had a one shot advantage heading into the final day of the 2015 Madeira Islands Open, a dual-ranked Challenge Tour and European Tour event, ultimately tying for fourth.

Widegren secured his European Tour card at the 2016 European Tour Qualifying School. In his rookie season in 2017, Widegren finished tied for third at the D+D Real Czech Masters.

== Amateur wins ==
- 2006 Mälarö Junior Open
- 2009 Swedish Junior Strokeplay Championship
- 2010 Ping-Golfweek Preview
- 2012 CSU San Marco Fall Classic

== Team appearances ==
Amateur

- European Boys' Team Championship (representing Sweden): 2006, 2007
- Junior Golf World Cup: 2006, 2007 (winners), 2008
- European Amateur Team Championship (representing Sweden): 2008, 2009, 2010, 2011
- Eisenhower Trophy (representing Sweden): 2008, 2012
- Palmer Cup (representing Europe): 2010, 2011, 2012 (winners), 2013
- St Andrews Trophy (representing the Continent of Europe): 2010 (winners)

== See also ==
- 2016 European Tour Qualifying School graduates
- 2017 European Tour Qualifying School graduates
