= Morten Ørum Madsen =

Danish golfer (born 1988)

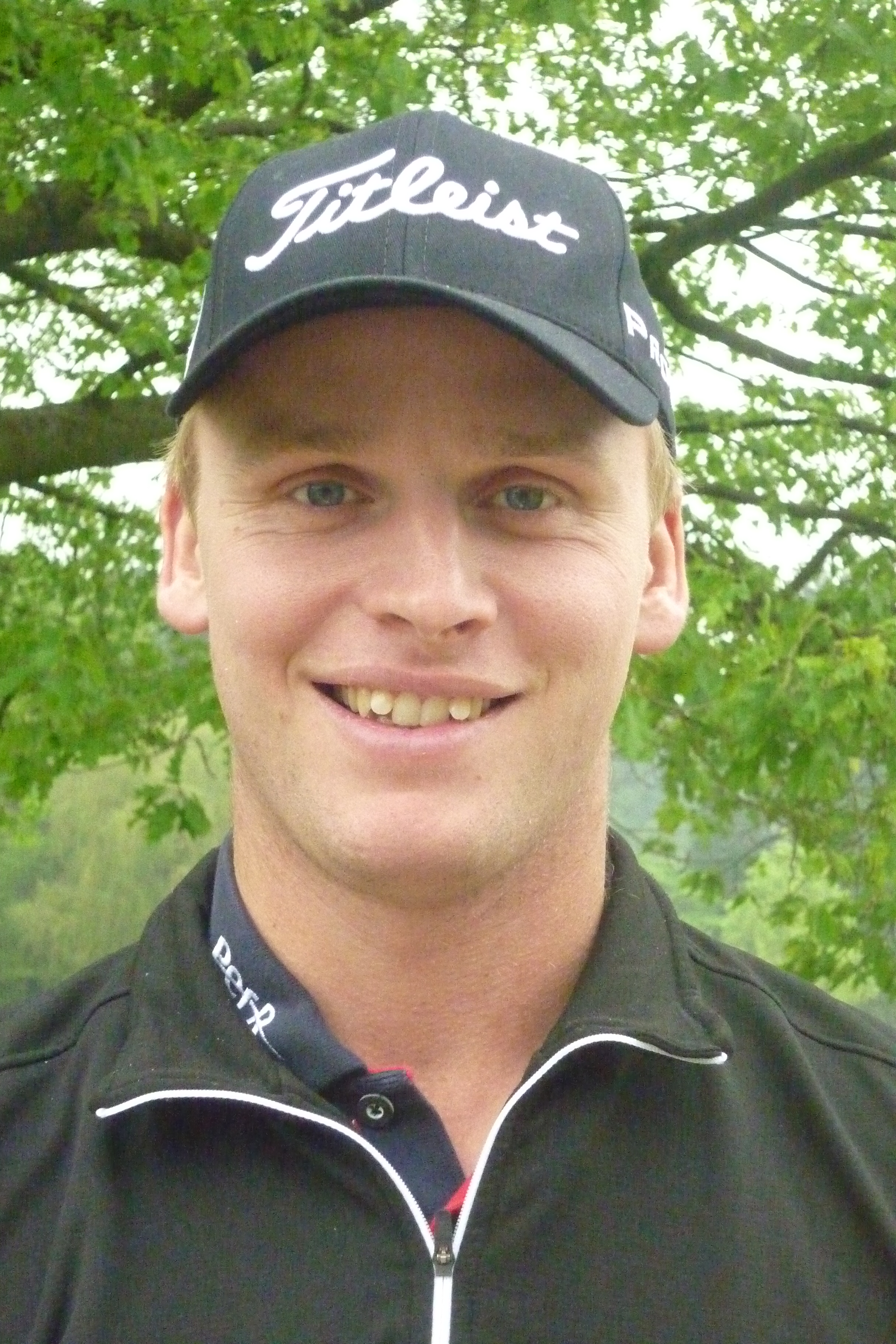

Personal information
- Nationality: Denmark
- Born: 9 April 1988 (age 38) Silkeborg, Denmark
- Height: 1.91 m (6 ft 3 in)
- Weight: 95 kg (209 lb; 15.0 st)

Career
- Sport: Golf
- College: Oregon State University
- Turned professional: 2011
- Current tour: Challenge Tour
- Former tour: European Tour
- Professional wins: 6

Number of wins by tour
- European Tour: 1
- Other: 5

Best results in major championships
- Masters Tournament: DNP
- PGA Championship: DNP
- U.S. Open: T28: 2013
- The Open Championship: CUT: 2012

Morten Ørum Madsen (born 9 April 1988) is a Danish professional golfer. He played on the European Tour from 2013 to 2016, winning the South African Open Championship in late 2013.

== Early life and amateur career ==
Madsen was born in Silkeborg. He took up golf at the age of 12, and enjoyed a successful amateur career. He played for Denmark in the 2008 Eisenhower Trophy and again in 2010, being part of the team that took the silver medal in 2010. He attended Oregon State University from 2008 to 2011.

== Professional career ==
In 2011, Madsen turned professional and promptly won twice on the third-tier Nordic League, earning a place on the Challenge Tour. A consistent second season saw him earn promotion to the full European Tour for 2013. He finished 19th in the Challenge Tour rankings, but slightly improved his status with a T16 at European Tour Q School.

On 24 November 2013, he won the South African Open Championship by a margin of two strokes.

A string of poor finishes saw him lose his European Tour privileges and he eventually returned to the Nordic Golf League, where he won an event, played in Spain, in February 2019 and another, played in Sweden, in May 2025.

== Amateur wins ==
- 2008 Houborg Open, Wibroe Cup, Royal Tour 1, Royal Tour 2
- 2009 Danish Amateur Strokeplay

== Professional wins (6) ==
=== European Tour wins (1) ===
No.	Date	Tournament	Winning score	Margin of victory	Runners-up
1	24 Nov 2013 (2014 season)	South African Open Championship^{1}	−19 (67-66-69-67=269)	2 strokes	(South Africa) Jbe' Kruger, (South Africa) Hennie Otto

^{1}Co-sanctioned by the Sunshine Tour

=== Nordic Golf League wins (5) ===
No.	Date	Tournament	Winning score	Margin of victory	Runner(s)-up
1	16 Jul 2011	Finnish Open	−10 (75-66-65=206)	6 strokes	(Finland) Joonas Granberg, (Finland) Jonas Haglund
2	5 Aug 2011	Actona PGA Championship	−6 (71-67-72=210)	2 strokes	(Denmark) Joachim B. Hansen
3	11 May 2013	DAT Masters	−14 (73-69-63=205)	4 strokes	(Sweden) Alexander Jacobsson, (Sweden) Jesper Kennegård
4	19 Feb 2019	PGA Catalunya Resort Championship	−8 (66-68-72=206)	1 stroke	(France) Mathieu Fenasse
5	17 May 2025	Cutter & Buck Fjällbacka Open	−11 (69-66-67=202)	Playoff	(Denmark) Jacob Worm Agerschou, (Sweden) Isak Eriksson Krabbe

== Results in major championships ==
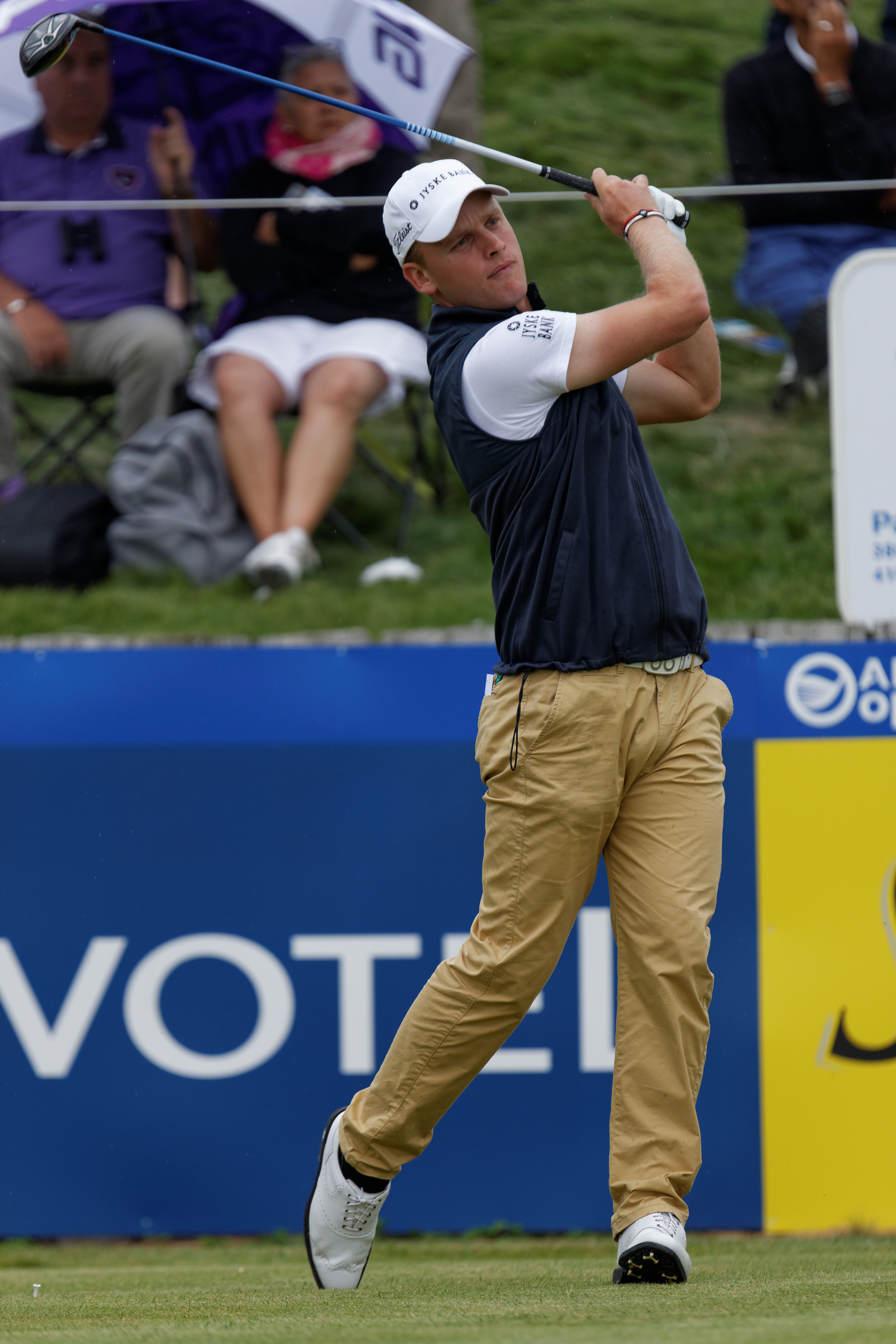
Morten Ørum Madsen

Tournament	2012	2013
Masters Tournament		
U.S. Open		T28
The Open Championship	CUT	
PGA Championship		

Did not play

CUT = missed the half-way cut
"T" = tied

== Team appearances ==
Amateur

- European Amateur Team Championship (representing Denmark): 2007, 2008, 2009, 2010
- Eisenhower Trophy (representing Denmark): 2008, 2010
- St Andrews Trophy (representing the Continent of Europe): 2010 (winners)

== See also ==
- 2012 Challenge Tour graduates
- 2012 European Tour Qualifying School graduates
