= Dale Whitnell =

English professional golfer

Personal information
- Nationality: England
- Born: 9 August 1988 (age 38) Colchester, England
- Height: 6 ft 0 in (1.83 m)

Career
- Sport: Golf
- Turned professional: 2009
- Current tour: European Tour
- Former tour: Challenge Tour
- Professional wins: 10

Number of wins by tour
- European Tour: 1
- Challenge Tour: 1
- Other: 8

Best results in major championships
- Masters Tournament: DNP
- PGA Championship: DNP
- U.S. Open: DNP
- The Open Championship: T60: 2012

Dale Whitnell (born 9 August 1988) is an English professional golfer who plays on the European Tour. He won the 2023 Volvo Car Scandinavian Mixed.

== Amateur career ==
Whitnell had a successful amateur career and he won the 2006 Abu Dhabi Junior Golf Championship. In 2008, he won the St Andrews Trophy and played in the Eisenhower Trophy with Luke Goddard and Sam Hutsby. In 2009, he was tapped to play in the Walker Cup team. He was part of the English teams earning silver medals at the European Amateur Team Championship in 2008 and 2009. Whitnell was ranked Number One amateur in England in 2009 and won the English Golf Union Order of Merit convincingly.

== Professional career ==
It took him 11 years to earn a full European Tour card after turning professional in 2009.

He came through local qualifying to play in the 2012 Open Championship and made the cut.

Through 2021, Whitnell had finished tied 4th on the European Tour three times, at the 2009 Alfred Dunhill Championship, the 2020 Betfred British Masters, and the 2021 Dubai Duty Free Irish Open. Whitnell shared the lead heading into the weekend at the 2021 Cazoo Classic after two opening rounds of 68, but two final rounds of 72 saw him finish in a tie for 13th.

In June 2023, Whitnell won his first European Tour title at the Volvo Car Scandinavian Mixed in Sweden. He recorded a 21-under par total of 267 to win by three shots ahead of Sean Crocker.

== Amateur wins ==
- 2006 Abu Dhabi Junior Golf Championship
- 2009 Portuguese Amateur, Tillman Trophy

== Professional wins (10) ==
=== European Tour wins (1) ===
No.	Date	Tournament	Winning score	Margin of victory	Runner-up
1	11 Jun 2023	Volvo Car Scandinavian Mixed^{1}	−21 (66-61-70-70=267)	3 strokes	(United States) Sean Crocker

^{1}Mixed event with the Ladies European Tour

=== Challenge Tour wins (1) ===
No.	Date	Tournament	Winning score	Margin of victory	Runner-up
1	1 Sep 2019	KPMG Trophy	−23 (70-64-64-63=261)	Playoff	(England) Laurie Canter

Challenge Tour playoff record (1–0)

No.	Year	Tournament	Opponent	Result
1	2019	KPMG Trophy	(England) Laurie Canter	Won with birdie on second extra hole

=== Jamega Pro Golf Tour wins (8) ===
No.	Date	Tournament	Winning score	Margin of victory	Runner(s)-up
1	22 Aug 2011	The Bristol Club	−9 (64-67=133)	1 stroke	(Northern Ireland) Jonathan Caldwell
2	29 Aug 2011	The Tytherington	−7 (72-65=137)	2 strokes	(England) Michael Lowe
3	13 Aug 2012	Hever Castle	−10 (66-68=134)	3 strokes	(England) Scott Fallon, (Wales) Mark Laskey
4	30 Jul 2013	Heythrop Park	−5 (68-71=139)	2 strokes	(England) Neil Reilly
5	23 Jul 2014	Aldwickbury Park	−6 (67-69=136)	Playoff	(England) Ricky Brackenbury
6	21 Jul 2015	Aldwickbury Park	−5 (71-66=137)	4 strokes	(England) Charlie Haggar, (England) Lloyd Kennedy, (England) Reece Phillips, (Scotland) Raymond Russell
7	13 Sep 2016	Hamptworth Golf Club	−10 (64-68=132)	5 strokes	(England) Steve Lewton
8	11 Sep 2018	Hamptworth International	−10 (66-66=132)	Playoff	(Canada) Callum Davison

== Results in major championships ==
Tournament	2012
The Open Championship	T60

"T" = Tied
Note: Whitnell only played in The Open Championship.

== Team appearances ==
Amateur

- European Boys' Team Championship (representing England): 2006
- European Amateur Team Championship (representing England): 2008, 2009
- St Andrews Trophy (representing Great Britain & Ireland): 2008
- Eisenhower Trophy (representing England): 2008
- European Nations Cup – Copa Sotogrande (representing England): 2009 (winners)
- Walker Cup (representing Great Britain & Ireland): 2009

== See also ==
- 2019 European Tour Qualifying School graduates
