= 2016 PGA EuroPro Tour =

Golf tour season

2016 PGA EuroPro Tour season
- Duration: 18 May 2016 – 21 October 2016
- Number of official events: 15
- Most wins: (England) Matthew Cort (2)
- Order of Merit: (England) Matthew Cort

The 2016 PGA EuroPro Tour, titled as the 2016 HotelPlanner.com PGA EuroPro Tour for sponsorship reasons, was the 15th season of the PGA EuroPro Tour, a third-tier tour recognised by the European Tour.

== Schedule ==
The following table lists official events during the 2016 season.

Date	Tournament	Location	Purse (£)	Winner (Note: The number in brackets after each winner's name is the number of PGA EuroPro Tour events they had won up to and including that tournament. It is rare for someone to accumulate many wins on the PGA EuroPro Tour as success at this level usually leads to promotion to the Challenge Tour.)	OWGR points
20 May	PDC Golf Championship	Oxfordshire	49,210	(Wales) Adam Runcie (1)	4
27 May	IFX International Championship	Surrey	47,885	(England) Richard Edginton (1)	4
24 Jun	Grenke Championship	Wiltshire	48,160	(Wales) Stephen Dodd (1)	4
1 Jul	Dawson and Sanderson Classic	Northumberland	47,030	(England) Matthew Cort (1)	4
7 Jul	Eagle Orchid Scottish Masters	Angus	49,705	(England) Billy Hemstock (4)	4
14 Jul	Motocaddy Masters	Dunbartonshire	47,605	(England) Matthew Cort (2)	4
29 Jul	Lookers Championship	Tyne and Wear	46,735	(Wales) Richard James (1)	4
5 Aug	World Snooker Golf Masters	Hampshire	49,460	(England) Chris Gane (1)	4
12 Aug	Pentahotels Championship	Berkshire	47,605	(England) James Wilkinson (2)	4
19 Aug	Matchroom Sport Championship	East Sussex	47,605	(England) Curtis Griffiths (1)	4
26 Aug	FORE Business Championship	Oxfordshire	47,320	(Wales) Mark Laskey (3)	4
2 Sep	Cobra Puma Golf Championship	Shropshire	48,695	(England) James Maw (1)	4
9 Sep	Glenfarclas Open	Renfrewshire	49,460	(England) Jonathan Thomson (1)	4
23 Sep	Clipper Logistics Championship	West Yorkshire	46,735	(Northern Ireland) Jonathan Caldwell (1)	4
21 Oct	Matchroom Sport Tour Championship	Spain	87,860	(England) Peter Tarver-Jones (3)	4

== Order of Merit ==
The Order of Merit was titled as the Race to Desert Springs and was based on prize money won during the season, calculated in Pound sterling. The top five players on the Order of Merit earned status to play on the 2017 Challenge Tour.

Position	Player	Prize money (£)	Status earned
1	(England) Matthew Cort	33,920	Promoted to Challenge Tour
2	(England) Peter Tarver-Jones	29,221	Promoted to Challenge Tour
3	(England) Curtis Griffiths	27,990	Promoted to Challenge Tour
4	(Wales) Richard James	26,555	Promoted to Challenge Tour
5	(Wales) Mark Laskey	23,375	Promoted to Challenge Tour
6	(England) Billy Hemstock	22,661	
7	(Northern Ireland) Jonathan Caldwell	22,361	
8	(England) Greg Payne	19,473	
9	(England) James Maw	19,413	
10	(England) Joe Dean	15,648	
