= Carlos Pigem =

Spanish golfer

Personal information
- Nationality: Spain
- Born: 6 July 1990 (age 36) Lleida, Spain
- Height: 1.77 m (5 ft 10 in)
- Weight: 71 kg (157 lb; 11.2 st)

Career
- Sport: Golf
- Turned professional: 2013
- Current tour: Asian Tour
- Former tour: European Tour
- Professional wins: 1

Number of wins by tour
- Asian Tour: 1

Carlos Pigem (born 6 July 1990) is a Spanish professional golfer.

Pigem has played on the Asian Tour since 2013. He picked up his first victory in 2016 at the Yeangder Tournament Players Championship.

== Amateur wins ==
this list may be incomplete

- 2011 Campeonato de Catalunya Junior
- 2012 Campeonato de Barcelona, Campeonato de Catalunya Absoluto, Campeonato de Canarias, World University Championship, Campeonato De Espana Amateur

== Professional wins (1) ==
=== Asian Tour wins (1) ===
No.	Date	Tournament	Winning score	Margin of victory	Runner-up
1	3 Jul 2016	Yeangder Tournament Players Championship^{1}	−12 (66-70-73-67=276)	Playoff	(Japan) Shunya Takeyasu

^{1}Co-sanctioned by the Taiwan PGA Tour

Asian Tour playoff record (1–0)

No.	Year	Tournament	Opponent	Result
1	2016	Yeangder Tournament Players Championship	(Japan) Shunya Takeyasu	Won with birdie on first extra hole

== Team appearances ==
Amateur

- Jacques Léglise Trophy (representing the Continent of Europe): 2008
- European Amateur Team Championship (representing Spain): 2008, 2009, 2010
- Bonallack Trophy (representing Europe): 2010 (canceled)
- Eisenhower Trophy (representing Spain): 2012
- St Andrews Trophy (representing the Continent of Europe): 2012 (winners)

== See also ==
- 2019 European Tour Qualifying School graduates
