= Jesper Kennegård =

Swedish professional golfer (born 1988)

Personal information
- Full name: Jesper Theodor Kennegård
- Nationality: Sweden
- Born: 11 July 1988 (age 38) Stockholm, Sweden
- Height: 6 ft 4 in (2 m)

Career
- Sport: Golf
- College: Arizona State University
- Turned professional: 2011
- Current tour: Challenge Tour
- Former tours: Asian Tour; Nordic Golf League
- Professional wins: 5

Achievements and awards
- Swedish Golf Tour Order of Merit winner: 2013
- Nordic Golf League Order of Merit winner: 2013
- PGA of Sweden Future Fund Award: 2014

Jesper Theodor Kennegård (born 11 July 1988) is a Swedish professional golfer and Challenge Tour player. He won the Junior Golf World Cup in 2007 and the Nordic Golf League Order of Merit in 2013.

== Early life and amateur career ==
Kennegård was born in 1988 and started playing golf at six. At six foot four, he has an imposing presence, like his father Stefan, who was a Swedish professional handballer with 24 appearances for the national team in the 1980s.

Kennegård was low amateur at the 2006 Scandinavian Masters, finishing T27, and had a successful career with the National Team winning several team medals. He won bronze at the 2005 European Boys' Team Championship in Italy together with Nicklas Glans, Pontus Widegren, Björn Åkesson, Rasmus Åstrand and David Lingmerth. In 2007, he won gold at the Junior Golf World Cup in Japan with Björn Åkesson, Pontus Widegren and Daniel Jennevret.

He won bronze at the 2008 Eisenhower Trophy held at the Royal Adelaide Golf Club in Australia with Henrik Norlander and Pontus Widegren. In 2010, he won silver at the 2010 European Amateur Team Championship at Österåker Golf Club together with Pontus Widegren, David Lingmerth, Nils Florén, Henrik Norlander and Robin Wingårdh.

He represented the Continent of Europe in the Jacques Léglise Trophy twice, and in the St Andrews Trophy twice.

Kennegård accepted a golf scholarship to Arizona State University and played with the Arizona State Sun Devils men's golf team between 2007 and 2011 with some success, winning three tournaments and named a third team All-American in 2009–10. When he left, Kennegård also ranked fourth in the university's all-time scoring average, just one place below Phil Mickelson, and two spots ahead of Paul Casey.

Kennegård crowned his college career with a selection to represent Europe in the 2010 Palmer Cup, where incidentally half the team was made up of his compatriots. Sweden's Walle Danewid coached the European team for the second straight year and the team also featured David Lingmerth, Henrik Norlander and Pontus Widegren.

== Professional career ==
Kennegård turned professional in 2011 but was unsuccessful at the European Tour Q-School in 2011, 2012, 2013, 2015 and 2016. Instead, he played on the Asian Tour in 2012, with a tie for sixth at the Worldwide Holdings Selangor Masters as his best result. He played in the Nordic Golf League in 2013 dominating the league, winning three times in 18 starts, as well as notching up a further 10 top-10 results. Promoted to the 2014 Challenge Tour however, he made only 2 cuts in 15 starts.

In 2021, Kennegård returned to his winning ways. He won the NGL's Stockholm Trophy in June, and in August he was runner-up at the Made in Esbjerg Challenge, a Challenge Tour event, which helped him climb into the top-400 in the Official World Golf Ranking for the first time.

After rounds of 68, 68, and 67 Kennegård led the Challenge Tour Grand Final in Mallorca ahead of the final round, and was on course to earn one of the 20 European Tour cards on offer. A 77 on the final day however, meant he finished the tournament T8 and the season 27th in the rankings.

== Amateur wins ==
- 2004 Vikingaskeppet, Bankboken Cup P16
- 2005 Haninge Junior Open
- 2006 Telia Tourkval Degeberga-Widtsköfle
- 2007 Alex Norén Junior Open

== Professional wins (5) ==
=== Nordic Golf League wins (5) ===
No.	Date	Tournament	Winning score	Margin of victory	Runner(s)-up
1	4 May 2013	Freja Championship	−9 (70-72-68=210)	8 strokes	(Sweden) Gabriel Axell, (Sweden) Pontus Ellerström
2	15 Jun 2013	Wisby Open	+2 (73-72-73=218)	1 stroke	(Sweden) Alexander Jacobsson, (Sweden) Patrik Sjöland
3	3 Aug 2013	SM Match	1 up		(Sweden) Joakim Lagergren
4	17 Aug 2019	Åhus KGK Pro-Am	−14 (66-67-69=202)	5 strokes	(Iceland) Axel Bóasson, (Denmark) Nicolai Kristensen
5	4 Jun 2021	Stockholm Trophy	−11 (65-67-73=205)	1 stroke	(Sweden) Jesper Svensson

== Team appearances ==
Amateur

- Junior Golf World Cup (representing Sweden): 2006, 2007 (winners)
- Jacques Léglise Trophy (representing the Continent of Europe): 2005 (winners), 2006 (winners)
- St Andrews Trophy (representing the Continent of Europe): 2008, 2010 (winners)
- European Boys' Team Championship (representing Sweden): 2005, 2006
- European Amateur Team Championship (representing Sweden): 2007, 2008, 2009, 2010
- Eisenhower Trophy (representing Sweden): 2008, 2010
- Palmer Cup (representing Europe): 2010
