= 2009 European Amateur Team Championship =

Golf competition

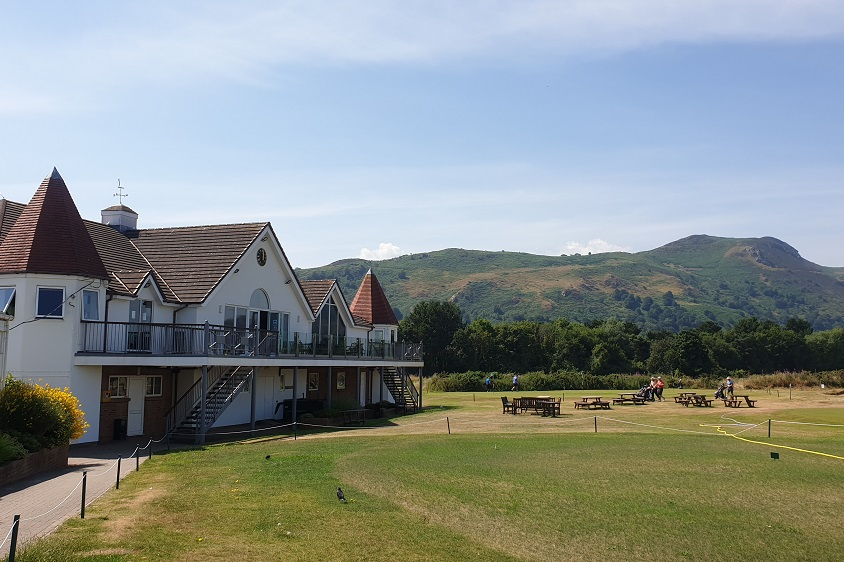
- Clubhouse at Conwy Golf Club

Tournament information
- Dates: 30 June – 4 July 2009
- Location: Conwy, Wales, United Kingdom; 53.2912°N 3.8435°W
- Course: Conwy Golf Club
- Organized by: European Golf Association
- Format: Qualification round: 36 holes stroke play Knock-out match-play

Statistics
- Par: 72
- Length: 6,910 yards (6,320 m)
- Field: 20 teams 120 players

Champion
- Scotland; Wallace Booth, Glenn Campbell, Gavin Dear, Ross Kellett, Paul O'Hara, Michael Stewart
- Qualification round: 716 (−4); Final match: 5–2

Location map
- Location in Europe Location on the British Isles Location in Wales

The 2009 European Amateur Team Championship took place 30 June – 4 July at Conwy Golf Club in Conwy County Borough, Wales, United Kingdom. It was the 27th men's golf European Amateur Team Championship.

== Venue ==
Conwy Golf Club was formed in 1890. Its links course in Conwy County Borough, on the north coast of Wales, was designed by Jack Morris, club professional at Royal Liverpool Golf Club and nephew of Old Tom Morris, the first nine holes in 1875 and additional nine holes in 1895.

The championship course was set up with par 72.

== Format ==
Each team consisted of 6 players, playing two rounds of stroke-play over two days, counting the five best scores each day for each team.

The eight best teams formed flight A, in knock-out match-play over the next three days. The teams were seeded based on their positions after the stroke play. The first placed team were drawn to play the quarter-final against the eight placed team, the second against the seventh, the third against the sixth and the fourth against the fifth. Teams were allowed to use six players during the team matches, selecting four of them in the two morning foursome games and five players in to the afternoon single games. Teams knocked out after the quarter-finals played one foursome game and four single games in each of their remaining matches. Games all square at the 18th hole were declared halved, if the team match was already decided.

The eight teams placed 9–16 in the qualification stroke-play formed flight B, to play similar knock-out play, with one foursome game and four single games in each match, to decide their final positions.

The four teams placed 17–20 formed flight C, to play each other in a round-robin system, with one foursome game and four single games in each match, to decide their final positions.

== Teams ==
20 nation teams contested the event, the same number of teams as at the previous event one year earlier. Each team consisted of six players.

Players in the leading teams

Country	Players
Austria	Hans Peter Bacher, Moritz Mayrhauser, Lukas Nemecz, Bernhard Reiter, Nikolaus Schroter, Johannes Steiner
Belgium	Xavier Feyaerts, Kevin Hesbois, Hugues Joannes, Christopher Mivis, Jean Relecom, Dimitri van Doren
Czech Republic	Jiri Korda, Stanislav Matus, David Prochazka, Jan Ryba, Viktor Skalle, Jakum Stanislav
Denmark	Sebastian Cappelen, Joachim B. Hansen, Andreas Hartø, Morten Ørum Madsen, Jacob Roth, Kristian Nielsen
England	Tommy Fleetwood, Charlie Ford, Luke Goddard, Matt Haines, Sam Hutsby, Dale Whitnell
Finland	Toni Hakula, Janne Kaske, Tapio Pulkkanen, Kalle Samooja, Henri Satama, Miro Veijalainen
France	Guillaume Cambis, Victor Dubuisson, Alexandre Kaleka, Alexander Levy, Johan Lopez Lazaro, Romain Wattel
Germany	Sean Einhaus, Max Glauert, Stephan Gross, Allen John, Maximilian Kieffer, Alexander Knappe
Greece	Panayiotis Boudouris, Evangelos Ginnis, Adam Kritikos, Christos Nikopoulos, Steve Parthenis, Kostantinos Ringas
Iceland	Axel Bóasson, Kristjan Einarsson, Hlynur Hjartarson, Sigurthór Jónsson, Ólafur Loftsson, Sigmundur Masson
Ireland	Clan Curley, Paul Cutler, Alan Dunbar, Niall Kearney, Dara Lernihan, Simon Ward
Italy	Nino Bertasio, Joon Kim, Matteo Manassero, Leonardo Motto, Andrea Pavan, Niccolò Quintarelli
Netherlands	Tristan Bierenbroodspot, Sven Maurits, Reinier Saxton, Tim Sluiter, Jurrian Van Der Vaart, Willem Vork
Norway	Elias Bertheussen, Knut Børsheim, Are Friestad, Espen Kofstad, Anders Kristiansen, Joakim Mikkelsen
Portugal	Pedro Figueiredo, Nuno Henriques, Josè Maria Jóia, Hugo Mota, Tiago Rodrigues, Manuel Violas
Scotland	Wallace Booth, Glenn Campbell, Gavin Dear, Ross Kellett, Paul O'Hara, Michael Stewart
Spain	Moises Cobo, Nacho Elvira, Sebastian Garcia Rodriguez, Pedro Oriol, Carlos Pigem, Juan Francisco Sarasti
Sweden	Pontus Gad, Jesper Kennegård, David Lingmerth, Henrik Norlander, Pontus Widegren, Robin Wingårdh
Turkey	Gencay Asan, Hasan Ceylan, Catatay Ural, Koray Varli, Guray Yazici, Yasin Yildirim
Wales	Nigel Edwards, Rhys Enoch, Oliver Farr, Adam Runcie, Ben Westgate, Joe Vickery

== Winners ==
Team Norway won the opening 36-hole competition, with a 30-under-par score of 690, three strokes ahead of team Italy. Neither host nation Wales or defending champions Ireland mad it to the quarter-finals, finishing 10th and 11th respectively.

There was no official award for the lowest individual score, but tied individual leaders were 16-year-old Matteo Manassero, Italy and Pontus Widegren, Sweden, each with a 10-under-par score of 134, one stroke ahead of Andrea Pavan, Italy.

Team Scotland won the gold medal, earning their sixth title, beating team England in the final 5–2.

Team Italy, earned the bronze on third place, after beating Norway 5–2 in the bronze match.

== Results ==
Qualification round

Team standings

Place	Country	Score	To par
1	Norway	347-343=690	−30
2	Italy	347-346=693	−27
3	Sweden	348-349=697	−23
4	England	344-356=700	−20
5	France	351-356=707	−13
T6	Scotland *	355-361=716	−4
T6	Germany	358-358=716	−4
8	Finland	364-354=718	−2
9	Netherlands	364-355=719	−1
10	Wales	354-366=720	E
11	Ireland	372-356=728	+8
12	Denmark	358-371=729	+9
13	Belgium	372-364=736	+16
T14	Portugal *	373-365=738	+18
T14	Iceland	370-368=738	+18
16	Spain	376-366=742	+22
17	Austria	377-369=746	+26
18	Czech Republic	391-393=784	+64
19	Greece	397-389=786	+66
20	Turkey	410-401=811	+91

* Note: In the event of a tie the order was determined by the best total of the two non-counting scores of the two rounds.

Individual leaders

Place	Player	Country	Score	To par
T1	Matteo Manassero	Italy	66-68=134	−10
T1	Pontus Widegren	Sweden	67-67=134	−10
3	Andrea Pavan	Italy	67-68=135	−9
4	Matt Haines	England	67-69=136	−8
T5	Espen Kofstad	Norway	72-65=137	−7
T5	David Lingmerth	Sweden	68-69=137	−7
T5	Joakim Mikkelsen	Norway	68-69=137	−7
T5	Romain Wattel	France	69-68=137	−7
T9	Wallace Booth	Scotland	72-66=138	−6
T9	Allen John	Germany	67-71=138	−6

Note: There was no official award for the lowest individual score.

Flight A

Bracket

Quarter finals
Italy	5.5
Germany	1.5
Scotland	4
Sweden	3
England	5.5
France	1.5
Norway	5
Finland	2

Semi finals
Scotland	4.5
Italy	2.5
England	4
Norway	3

Final
Scotland	5
England	2
Bronze match
Italy	5
Norway	2

Elimination matches
Sweden	3
Germany	2
France	3
Finland	2

Match for 5th place
France	3
Sweden	2
Match for 7th place
Finland	3
Germany	2

Final games

Scotland	England
5	2
G. Dear / G. Campbell 1 hole	D. Whitnell / C. Ford
W. Booth / M. Stewart 2 & 1	M. Haines / T. Fleetwood
Gavin Dear	Matt Haines 19th hole
Wallace Booth	Sam Hutsby 5 & 4
Michael Stewart 5 & 4	Dale Whitnell
Ross Kellett 1 hole	Tommy Fleetwood
Paul O'Hara 2 & 1	Luke Goddard

Flight B

Bracket

Round 1
Spain	3
Netherlands	2
Denmark	3
Belgium	2
Ireland	3
Portugal	2
Iceland	3
Wales	2

Round 2
Denmark	3
Spain	2
Ireland	4
Iceland	1

Match for 9th place
Ireland	3
Denmark	2
Match for 11th place
Spain	3
Iceland	2

Elimination matches
Netherlands	3
Belgium	2
Portugal	3.5
Wales	1.5

Match for 13th place
Netherlands	4
Portugal	1
Match for 15th place
Belgium	3
Wales	2

Flight C

First round

Czech Republic	Greece
4	1

Austria	Turkey
4	1

Second round

Czech Republic	Turkey
5	0

Austria	Greece
3	2

Third round

Austria	Czech Republic
3	2

Greece	Turkey
3	2

Final standings

Place	Country
1st place, gold medalist(s)	Scotland
2nd place, silver medalist(s)	England
3rd place, bronze medalist(s)	Italy
4	Norway
5	France
6	Sweden
7	Finland
8	Germany
9	Ireland
10	Denmark
11	Spain
12	Iceland
13	Netherlands
14	Portugal
15	Belgium
16	Wales
17	Austria
18	Czech Republic
19	Greece
20	Turkey

== See also ==
- Eisenhower Trophy – biennial world amateur team golf championship for men organized by the International Golf Federation.
- European Ladies' Team Championship – European amateur team golf championship for women organised by the European Golf Association.
