= Rhys Enoch =

Welsh golfer (born 1988)

Personal information
- Full name: Rhys Alexander Enoch
- Nickname: Reen
- Nationality: Wales
- Born: 16 June 1988 (age 38) Truro, Cornwall, England
- Spouse: Lynn van Rooyen
- Children: 1

Career
- Sport: Golf
- College: East Tennessee State University
- Turned professional: 2012
- Current tours: Sunshine Tour; Challenge Tour
- Former tour: European Tour
- Professional wins: 6

Number of wins by tour
- Sunshine Tour: 3
- Challenge Tour: 2
- Other: 2

Best results in major championships
- Masters Tournament: DNP
- PGA Championship: DNP
- U.S. Open: 71st: 2019
- The Open Championship: T67: 2018

Rhys Alexander Enoch (born 16 June 1988) is a Welsh professional golfer who plays on the Challenge Tour and the Sunshine Tour. He won the 2018 Cape Town Open and the 2019 D+D Real Slovakia Challenge. In 2019 he narrowly missed out in a playoff to finish second in the Zambia Open.

Enoch secured a card for the 2024 European Tour season via Q School.

== Professional wins (6) ==
=== Sunshine Tour wins (3) ===
No.	Date	Tournament	Winning score	Margin of victory	Runner(s)-up
1	25 Feb 2018	Cape Town Open	−19 (64-69-67-69=269)	1 stroke	(South Africa) Peter Karmis
2	7 Mar 2021	Kit Kat Group Pro-Am	−12 (66-71-67=204)	1 stroke	(South Africa) Dean Burmester, (South Africa) Jake Redman
3	4 Feb 2024	SDC Open^{1}	−24 (66-66-66-66=264)	2 strokes	(South Africa) Deon Germishuys, (South Africa) Martin Rohwer

^{1}Co-sanctioned by the Challenge Tour

Sunshine Tour playoff record (0–1)

No.	Year	Tournament	Opponent	Result
1	2019	Zanaco Masters	(South Africa) J. C. Ritchie	Lost to birdie on first extra hole

=== Challenge Tour wins (2) ===
No.	Date	Tournament	Winning score	Margin of victory	Runner(s)-up
1	7 Jul 2019	D+D Real Slovakia Challenge	−18 (68-69-65-68=270)	1 stroke	(New Zealand) Josh Geary
2	4 Feb 2024	SDC Open^{1}	−24 (66-66-66-66=264)	2 strokes	(South Africa) Deon Germishuys, (South Africa) Martin Rohwer

^{1}Co-sanctioned by the Sunshine Tour

=== Jamega Pro Golf Tour wins (1) ===
No.	Date	Tournament	Winning score	Margin of victory	Runner-up
1	10 Sep 2012	Bowood	−5 (69-70=139)	2 strokes	(England) Luke Joy

=== Portugal Pro Golf Tour wins (1) ===
No.	Date	Tournament	Winning score	Margin of victory	Runner-up
1	29 Nov 2017	Boavista Classic	−10 (65-67=132)	2 strokes	(England) Josh Fagan

== Results in major championships ==
Tournament	2014	2015	2016	2017	2018
Masters Tournament					
U.S. Open					
The Open Championship	CUT				T67
PGA Championship					

Tournament	2019
Masters Tournament	
PGA Championship	
U.S. Open	71
The Open Championship	

Did not play

CUT = missed the half-way cut
"T" = tied for place

== Team appearances ==
Amateur

- Jacques Léglise Trophy (representing Great Britain & Ireland): 2006
- Eisenhower Trophy (representing Wales): 2008
- European Amateur Team Championship (representing Wales): 2007, 2008, 2009, 2010, 2011
- Palmer Cup (representing Europe): 2010
- Bonallack Trophy (representing Europe): 2012 (winners)

Professional

- European Championships (representing Great Britain): 2018

== See also ==
- 2023 European Tour Qualifying School graduates
