= 2010 Eisenhower Trophy =

Golf tournament

Tournament information
- Dates: 28–31 October
- Location: Buenos Aires, Argentina; 34.467°S 58.699°W
- Courses: Buenos Aires Golf Club; Olivos Golf Club
- Format: 72 holes stroke play

Statistics
- Par: 72 (Buenos Aires); 71 (Olivos)
- Field: 69 teams 207 players

Champion
- France; Alexander Lévy, Johann Lopez-Lazaro & Romain Wattel
- 423 (−7)
- Location in Argentina Location in Buenos Aires Province

The 2010 Eisenhower Trophy took place 28–31 October at the Buenos Aires Golf Club and the Olivos Golf Club in Buenos Aires, Argentina. It was the 27th World Amateur Team Championship for the Eisenhower Trophy and the second to be held in Argentina. The tournament was a 72-hole stroke play team event with 69 three-man teams. The best two scores for each round counted towards the team total. Each team was due to play two rounds on the two courses.

Weather delays on the second day meant that the second round was not completed until the third day and the event was reduced to 54 holes. The leading 36 teams played their third round at Buenos Aires Golf Club while the others played at Olivos Golf Club.

France won their first Eisenhower Trophy, four strokes ahead of Denmark, who took the silver medal. The United States took the bronze medal while New Zealand finished fourth. Joachim B. Hansen from Denmark had the best 54-hole aggregate of 209, 6 under par.

== Teams ==
69 three-man teams contested the event.

The following table lists the players on the leading teams.

Country	Players
Australia	Matt Jager, Bryden Macpherson, Kieran Pratt
Belgium	Thomas Detry, Christopher Mivis, Thomas Pieters
Canada	Cam Burke, Albin Choi, Eugene Wong
Colombia	Andres Echavarria, Carlos Rodríguez, Marcelo Rozo
Denmark	Lucas Bjerregaard, Joachim B. Hansen, Morten Ørum Madsen
England	Laurie Canter, Tom Lewis, Eddie Pepperell
France	Alexander Lévy, Johann Lopez-Lazaro, Romain Wattel
Germany	Maximilian Kieffer, Alexis Szappanos, Philipp Westermann
Iceland	Hlynur Geir Hjartarson, Olafur Loftsson, Guðmundur Kristjánsson
Ireland	Paul Cutler, Alan Dunbar, Kevin Phelan
Italy	Nino Bertasio, Andrea Pavan, Niccolo Quintarelli
Japan	Masahiro Kawamura, Satoshi Kodaira, Keisuke Otawa
New Zealand	Ben Campbell, Ryan Fox, Peter Spearman-Burn
Norway	Elias Bertheussen, Espen Kofstad, Joakim Mikkelsen
Portugal	Pedro Figueiredo, José-Maria Jóia, Manuel Violas
Scotland	James Byrne, Ross Kellett, Michael Stewart
South Africa	J. G. Claassen, Dylan Frittelli, Dean O'Riley
South Korea	Kim Meen-whee, Lee Jae-hyeok, Park Il-hwan
Sweden	Jeff Karlsson, Jesper Kennegård, Henrik Norlander
Switzerland	Edouard Amacher, Ken Benz, Benjamin Rusch
United States	David Chung, Scott Langley, Peter Uihlein
Wales	Oliver Farr, Alastair Jones, Rhys Pugh

== Results ==
Place	Country	Score	To par
1st place, gold medalist(s)	France	137-142-144=423	−7
2nd place, silver medalist(s)	Denmark	139-141-147=427	−3
3rd place, bronze medalist(s)	United States	143-142-143=428	−2
4	New Zealand	142-144-149=435	+5
5	Scotland	150-140-146=436	+6
6	Ireland	150-146-143=439	+9
7	Germany	146-147-147=440	+10
T8	Belgium	146-151-144=441	+11
T8	Canada	137-151-153=441	+11
T8	England	141-148-152=441	+11
T11	Colombia	143-146-153=442	+12
T11	Switzerland	149-146-147=442	+12
T13	Norway	148-147-150=445	+15
T13	Portugal	153-141-151=445	+15
T13	South Korea	145-147-153=445	+15
T13	Sweden	141-146-158=445	+15
T17	Italy	146-143-157=446	+16
T17	Japan	146-147-153=446	+16
19	Iceland	147-146-154=447	+17
20	South Africa	147-152-149=448	+18
T21	Austria	148-144-157=449	+19
T21	Finland	148-147-154=449	+19
T21	Spain	145-147-157=449	+19
T21	Wales	148-148-153=449	+19
25	Argentina	147-152-151=450	+20
T26	Australia	143-154-154=451	+21
T26	Mexico	144-152-155=451	+21
T28	China	143-154-155=452	+22
T28	Chinese Taipei	147-150-155=452	+22
T30	Malaysia	147-154-154=455	+25
T30	Singapore	147-154-154=455	+25
T32	Czech Republic	152-148-157=457	+27
T32	Puerto Rico	145-152-160=457	+27
34	Netherlands	145-153-160=458	+28
35	Hong Kong	146-150-163=459	+29
36	Peru	149-149-164=462	+32
T37	Bermuda	150-155-150=455	+27
T37	Brazil	155-150-150=455	+27
T37	Chile	147-158-150=455	+27
T40	Paraguay	160-150-147=457	+29
T40	Uruguay	152-153-152=457	+29
42	Venezuela	148-154-157=459	+31
T43	Dominican Republic	150-160-151=461	+33
T43	Philippines	156-154-151=461	+33
T45	India	152-155-156=463	+35
T45	Zimbabwe	151-159-153=463	+35
47	Slovenia	155-155-154=464	+36
48	El Salvador	149-154-162=465	+37
49	Kenya	154-155-157=466	+38
T50	Costa Rica	149-160-158=467	+39
T50	Slovakia	156-147-164=467	+39
52	Barbados	153-159-157=469	+41
53	Pakistan	151-159-160=470	+42
54	Guatemala	152-167-153=472	+44
55	Ecuador	165-156-152=473	+45
T56	Bolivia	149-165-163=477	+49
T56	Turkey	159-157-161=477	+49
58	United Arab Emirates	157-162-161=480	+52
59	Guam	158-170-158=486	+58
60	Serbia	167-161-166=494	+66
61	Egypt	162-161-172=495	+67
62	Nigeria	167-178-164=509	+81
63	Qatar	181-160-169=510	+82
64	Tanzania	166-177-170=513	+85
65	Iran	179-175-164=518	+90
66	Bulgaria	171-177-181=529	+101
67	Croatia	179-186-173=538	+110
WD	Eswatini	158-156-WD	
WD	Botswana	160-161-WD	

The leading 36 teams played their third round at Buenos Aires Golf Club with the remaining teams playing at Olivos Golf Club.

== Individual leaders ==
There was no official recognition for the lowest individual scores.

Place	Player	Country	Score	To par
1	Joachim B. Hansen	Denmark	67-69-73=209	−6
2	Alexander Lévy	France	68-72-72=212	−3
3	Romain Wattel	France	69-70-74=213	−2
T4	James Byrne	Scotland	75-68-71=214	−1
T4	Ben Campbell	New Zealand	69-70-75=214	−1
T4	Maximilian Kieffer	Germany	70-73-71=214	−1
T4	Peter Uihlein	United States	72-72-70=214	−1
T4	Eugene Wong	Canada	67-75-72=214	−1
T9	David Chung	United States	73-70-73=216	+1
T9	Pedro Figueiredo	Portugal	76-69-71=216	+1

Players in the leading teams played two rounds at Buenos Aires Golf Club and one at Olivos Golf Club.
