= 2008 European Amateur Team Championship =

Golf competition

Tournament information
- Dates: 1–5 July 2008
- Location: Fiano, Piedmont, Italy; 45°10′N 7°34′E
- Course: Royal Park Golf & Country Club (Allianz Course)
- Organized by: European Golf Association
- Format: Qualification round: 36 holes stroke play Knock-out match-play

Statistics
- Par: 72
- Length: 6,566 yards (6,004 m)
- Field: 20 teams 120 players

Champion
- Ireland; Jonathan Caldwell, Paul Cutler, Niall Kearney, Shane Lowry, Paul O'Hanlon, Gareth Shaw
- Qualification round: 719 (−1); Final match: 4 1/2–2 1/2

Location map
- Location in Europe Location in Italy Location in Piedmont

The 2008 European Amateur Team Championship took place 1–5 July at Royal Park Golf & Country Club in Fiano, Italy. It was the 26th men's golf European Amateur Team Championship.

It was the first time the championship was played in consecutive years, since its inauguration in 1959.

== Venue ==
The club was founded in 1971 by the Agnelli family. Its first course, the Allianz Course, a parkland and forest course, in Fiano, in the Metropolitan City of Turin, about 20 kilometers (12 miles) northwest of Turin, in the region Piedmont, Italy, was designed the same year by Robert Trent Jones Sr. The course had previously hosted the 2009–2012 Italian Open on the European Tour.

== Format ==
Each team consisted of 6 players, playing two rounds of stroke-play over two days, counting the five best scores each day for each team.

The eight best teams formed flight A, in knock-out match-play over the next three days. The teams were seeded based on their positions after the stroke play. The first placed team were drawn to play the quarter-final against the eight placed team, the second against the seventh, the third against the sixth and the fourth against the fifth. Teams were allowed to use six players during the team matches, selecting four of them in the two morning foursome games and five players in to the afternoon single games. Teams knocked out after the quarter-finals played one foursome game and four single games in each of their remaining matches. Games all square at the 18th hole were declared halved, if the team match was already decided.

The eight teams placed 9–16 in the qualification stroke-play formed flight B, to play similar knock-out play, with one foursome game and four single games in each match, to decide their final positions.

The four teams placed 17–20 formed flight C, to play each other in a round-robin system, with one foursome game and four single games in each match, to decide their final positions.

== Teams ==
20 nation teams contested the event, the same number of teams as at the previous event one year earlier. Poland took part for the first time. Each team consisted of six players.

Players in the teams

Country	Players
Austria	Hans Peter Bacher, Tano Kromer, Bernhard Reiter, Florian Sander, Philipp Sharma, Johannes Steiner
Belgium	Xavier Feyaerts, Patrick Hanauer, Hugues Joannes, Christopher Mivis, Pierre Relecom, Francois Verheyen
Denmark	Peter Baunsoe, Morten Ørum Madsen, Kristian Nielsen, Rasmus Hjelm Nielsen, Jacob Roth
England	Charlie Ford, Matt Haines, Sam Hutsby, Steve Uzzell, Dale Whitnell, Chris Wood
Estonia	Gert Holland, Torel Neider, Egert Poldma, Paul Pohi, Mait Schmidt, Mark Suursalu
Finland	Janne Kaske, Immu Korvenmaa, Tuomas Pollari, Mikael Salminen, Kalle Samooja, Henri Satama
France	David Antoneli, Édouard Dubois, Victor Dubuisson, Benjamin Hebert, Alexandre Kaleka, Jean Wolff
Germany	Sean Einhaus, Florian Fritsch, Stephan Gross, Allen John, Maximilian Kieffer, Alexander Knappe
Iceland	Kristjan Einarsson, Sigmundur Einar Masson, Stefan Mar Stefansson, Hlynur Hjartarson, Sigurthór Jónsson, Ólafur Loftsson,
Ireland	Jonathan Caldwell, Paul Cutler, Niall Kearney, Shane Lowry, Paul O'Hanlon, Gareth Shaw
Italy	Nino Bertasio, Federico Colombo, Matteo Manassero, Andrea Pavan, Cristiano Terragni, Claudio Vigano
Netherlands	Tristan Bierenbroodspot, Richard Kind, Reinier Saxton, Tim Sluiter, Jurrian Van Der Vaart, Floris de Vries
Norway	Morten Erik Bergan, Knut Børsheim, Tor Erik Knudsen, Espen Kofstad, Markus Leandersson, Joakim Mikkelsen
Poland	Steven Janicki, Mateusz Jedrzejczyk, Michal Kaspronicz, Tomasz Pulsakonski, Daniel Snoey, Michal Waclawek
Portugal	Pedro Figueiredo, Ricardo Gouveia, Nuno Henriques, Josè Maria Joia, Tiago Rodrigues, Manuel Violas
Scotland	Wallace Booth, Gavin Dear, Callum Macaulay, Paul O'Hara, Keir M'Nicoll, Michael Stewart
Spain	Jorge Campillo, Moises Cobo, Borja Etchart, Pedro Oriol, Carlos Pigem, Juan Sarasti,
Sweden	Jesper Kennegård, Henrik Norlander, Tobias Rosendahl, Fredrik Quicker, Pontus Widegren, Björn Åkesson
Switzerland	Ken Benz, Roberto Francioni, Marc Dobias, Oliver Gilmartin, Steven Rojas, Benjamin Rusch
Wales	Nigel Edwards, Ben Enoch, Rhys Enoch, Craig Evans, Zac Gould, Ben Westgate

== Winners ==
Five-time-winners team Scotland won the opening 36-hole competition, with a 22-under-par score of 698. Tied five strokes behind were team Sweden and team Germany. Sweden earned 2nd place on the tie breaking better non-counting scores. Host nation Italy, with 15-year-old future European Tour winner Matteo Manassero in the team, finished 5th.

There was no official award for the lowest individual score, but individual leader were Wallace Booth, Scotland, with a 10-under-par score of 134, two strokes ahead of Jorge Campillo, Spain, and Callum Macaulay, Scotland.

Defending champions team Ireland, led by team captain Michael Burns, won the gold medal, earning their sixth title, beating team England in the final 4 1/2–2 1/2. The winning Irish team, combined from the Republic of Ireland and Northern Ireland, included future professional major winner 21-year-old Shane Lowry.

Team Germany, earned the bronze on third place, after beating France 4–3 in the bronze match.

== Results ==
Qualification round

Team standings

Place	Country	Score	To par
1	Scotland	349-349=698	−22
T2	Sweden *	349-354=703	−17
T2	Germany	351-352=703	−17
4	England	358-347=705	−15
5	Italy	353-355=708	−12
6	Spain	352-357=709	−11
7	Ireland	353-366=719	−1
8	France	349-373=722	+2
T9	Netherlands *	358-367=725	+5
T9	Finland	357-368=725	+5
11	Wales	357-369=726	+6
12	Norway	364-366=730	+10
13	Denmark	363-369=732	+12
14	Austria	368-371=739	+19
T15	Portugal *	373-373=746	+26
T15	Belgium	373-373=746	+26
17	Switzerland	375-374=749	+29
18	Iceland	387-370=757	+37
19	Estonia	410-408=818	+98
20	Poland	404-418=822	+102

* Note: In the event of a tie the order was determined by the best total of the two non-counting scores of the two rounds.

Individual leaders

Place	Player	Country	Score	To par
1	Wallace Booth	Scotland	69-65=134	−10
T2	Jorge Campillo	Spain	68-67=135	−9
T2	Callum Macaulay	Scotland	65-70=135	−9
T4	Tobias Rosendal	Sweden	68-69=137	−7
T4	Chris Wood	England	72-65=137	−7
T6	Espen Kofstad	Norway	69-69=138	−6
T6	Alexander Knappe	Germany	67-71=138	−6
T6	Gareth Shaw	Ireland	68-70=138	−6
T6	Floris de Vries	Netherlands	64-74=138	−6
T10	Borja Etchart	Spain	68-71=139	−5
T10	Sam Hutsby	England	70-69=139	−5
T10	Henrik Norlander	Sweden	70-69=139	−5
T10	Andrea Pavan	Italy	68-71=139	−5

Note: There was no official award for the lowest individual score.

Flight A

Bracket

Quarter finals
Ireland	5.5
Sweden	1.5
Germany	5
Spain	2
England	5.5
Italy	1.5
France	4.5
Scotland	2.5

Semi finals
Ireland	5
Germany	2
England	5
France	2

Final
Ireland	4.5
England	2.5
Bronze match
Germany	4
France	3

Elimination matches
Spain	3
Sweden	2
Scotland	3.5
Italy	1.5

Match for 5th place
Scotland	3
Spain	2
Match for 7th place
Sweden	3
Italy	2

Final games

Ireland	England
4.5	2.5
G. Shaw / S. Lowry	C. Wood / S. Hutsby 1 hole
P. Cutler / J. Caldwell 3 & 1	S. Uzzell / D. Whitnell
Gareth Shaw 2 & 1	Charlie Ford
Paul Cutler 1 hole	Chris Wood
Niall Kearney 3 & 2	Matt Haines
Jonathan Caldwell AS *	Sam Hutsby AS *
Shane Lowry	Dale Whitnell 5 & 3

* Note: Game declared halved, since team match already decided.

Flight B

Bracket

Round 1
Netherlands	4
Belgium	1
Norway	3
Denmark	2
Austria	3
Wales	2
Portugal	4
Finland	1

Round 2
Netherlands	3
Denmark	2
Austria	3
Portugal	2

Match for 9th place
Netherlands	3
Austria	2
Match for 11th place
Denmark	4
Portugal	1

Elimination matches
Belgium	5
Norway	0
Wales	3
Finland	2

Match for 13th place
Norway	3.5
Wales	1.5
Match for 15th place
Belgium	3
Finland	2

Flight C

First round

Switzerland	Poland
5	0

Iceland	Estonia
5	0

Second round

Switzerland	Estonia
4	1

Iceland	Poland
5	0

Third round

Iceland	Switzerland
3	2

Poland	Estonia
3	2

Final standings

Place	Country
1st place, gold medalist(s)	Ireland
2nd place, silver medalist(s)	England
3rd place, bronze medalist(s)	Germany
4	France
5	Scotland
6	Spain
7	Sweden
8	Italy
9	Netherlands
10	Austria
11	Denmark
12	Portugal
13	Norway
14	Wales
15	Belgium
16	Finland
17	Iceland
18	Switzerland
19	Poland
20	Estonia

== See also ==
- European Golf Association – Organizer of European amateur golf championships
- Eisenhower Trophy – biennial world amateur team golf championship for men organized by the International Golf Federation.
- European Ladies' Team Championship – European amateur team golf championship for women organised by the European Golf Association.
