= 2011 EPD Tour =

Golf tour season

2011 EPD Tour season
- Duration: 23 January 2011 – 3 October 2011
- Number of official events: 20
- Most wins: (Netherlands) Reinier Saxton (3)
- Order of Merit: (Netherlands) Reinier Saxton

The 2011 EPD Tour was the 15th season of the EPD Tour, a third-tier tour recognised by the European Tour.

== Schedule ==
The following table lists official events during the 2011 season.

Date	Tournament	Host country	Purse (€)	Winner (Note: The number in brackets after each winner's name is the number of EPD Tour events they had won up to and including that tournament. It is rare for someone to accumulate many wins on the EPD Tour as success at this level usually leads to promotion to the Challenge Tour.)
25 Jan	Tat Golf Classic	Turkey	30,000	(Germany) Christoph Günther (9)
30 Jan	Sueno Dunes Classic	Turkey	30,000	(Germany) Sebastian Bühl (2)
3 Feb	Sueno Pines Classic	Turkey	30,000	(Germany) Maximilian Glauert (1)
18 Feb	Cimar Open Samanah	Morocco	30,000	(Italy) Nino Bertasio (1)
24 Feb	Al Maaden Classic	Morocco	30,000	(Netherlands) Reinier Saxton (1)
1 Mar	Amelkis Classic	Morocco	30,000	(Germany) Guillaume Watremez (1)
9 Apr	Tikida Open	Morocco	30,000	(Scotland) Gavin Dear (1)
15 Apr	Auto Hall Open	Morocco	30,000	(Netherlands) Reinier Saxton (2)
22 Apr	Open Mogador	Morocco	30,000	(Germany) Alexander Knappe (1)
18 May	Haugschlag NÖ Open	Austria	30,000	(Germany) Allen John (1)
25 May	Schloss Moyland Golfresort Classic	Germany	30,000	(Germany) Sebastian Heisele (a) (1)
10 Jun	Land Fleesensee Classic	Germany	30,000	(England) Ben Parker (1)
30 Jun	Haus Bey Classic	Germany	30,000	(Netherlands) Reinier Saxton (3)
5 Jul	Coburg Brose Open	Germany	30,000	(Germany) Sebastian Bühl (3)
28 Jul	Internetworld.de Open	Germany	30,000	(Germany) Daniel Wünsche (4)
3 Aug	Bad Waldsee Classic	Germany	30,000	(England) Ben Parker (2)
18 Aug	Pfaffing Classic	Germany	30,000	(Germany) Maximilian Glauert (2)
24 Aug	Golf & Country Club Christnach Classic	Germany	30,000	(Germany) Dennis Küpper (7)
6 Sep	Preis des Hardenberg GolfResort	Germany	30,000	(Germany) Dennis Küpper (8)
3 Oct	Fulda EPD Tour Championship	Germany	45,000	(England) Darren Wright (1)

== Order of Merit ==
The Order of Merit was based on prize money won during the season, calculated in Euros. The top five players on the Order of Merit (not otherwise exempt) earned status to play on the 2012 Challenge Tour.

Position	Player	Prize money (€)	Status earned
1	(Netherlands) Reinier Saxton	34,809	Qualified for European Tour (Top 25 in Q School)
2	(Germany) Sebastian Bühl	32,656	Qualified for Challenge Tour (made cut in Q School)
3	(Germany) Maximilian Glauert	31,173	Promoted to Challenge Tour
4	(Germany) Christoph Günther	24,502	Promoted to Challenge Tour
5	(Germany) Dennis Küpper	19,914	Promoted to Challenge Tour
6	(Germany) Allen John	19,664	Promoted to Challenge Tour
7	(England) Ben Parker	19,392	Qualified for Challenge Tour (made cut in Q School)
8	(Germany) Alexander Knappe	15,558	Promoted to Challenge Tour
9	(Germany) Marcel Haremza	14,642	
10	(France) Damien Perrier	12,713	
