= Niall Kearney =

Irish professional golfer (born 1988)

Personal information
- Nationality: Ireland
- Born: 10 March 1988 (age 38) Dublin, Ireland
- Height: 6 ft 4 in (1.93 m)
- Weight: 187 lb (85 kg; 13.4 st)

Career
- Sport: Golf
- Turned professional: 2009
- Current tour: Challenge Tour
- Former tours: European Tour; Asian Tour; PGA EuroPro Tour
- Professional wins: 4

Niall Kearney (born 10 March 1988) is an Irish professional golfer. Kearney enjoyed a successful amateur career, playing in the 2009 Walker Cup. He won the Irish PGA Championship in 2014, 2015 and 2024. He played in the 2015 PGA Cup and, in the last singles match, holed an 8-foot putt to win his match and give Great Britain and Ireland their first PGA Cup victory in America.

== Amateur wins ==
- 2009 Brabazon Trophy

== Professional wins (4) ==
- 2014 Irish PGA Championship, PGA Play-offs
- 2015 Irish PGA Championship
- 2024 Irish PGA Championship

== Team appearances ==
Amateur

- European Boys' Team Championship (representing Ireland): 2005
- Jacques Léglise Trophy (representing Great Britain & Ireland): 2006 (captain)
- European Amateur Team Championship (representing Ireland): 2008, 2009
- Walker Cup (representing Great Britain & Ireland): 2009 (winners)

Professional

- PGA Cup (representing Great Britain and Ireland): 2015 (winners)
