= 2010 European Amateur Team Championship =

Golf competition

Tournament information
- Dates: 6–10 July 2010
- Location: Stockholm, Sweden; 59.4913°N 18.254°E
- Course: Österåker Golf Club (Västerled Course)
- Organized by: European Golf Association
- Format: Qualification round: 36 holes stroke play Knock-out match-play

Statistics
- Par: 72
- Length: 7,017 yards (6,416 m)
- Field: 20 teams 120 players

Champion
- England; Laurie Canter, Tommy Fleetwood, Billy Hemstock, Tom Lewis, Chris Paisley, Eddie Pepperell
- Qualification round: 723 (+3); Final match: 4 1/2–2 1/2

Location map
- Location in Europe Location Sweden Location in Stockholm

The 2010 European Amateur Team Championship took place 6–10 July at Österåker Golf Club in Åkersberga, Sweden. It was the 28th men's golf European Amateur Team Championship.

== Venue ==
The club was founded in 1988 and its Västerled course, opened the same year, was co-designed by Sven Tumba and Jan Sederholm and located 20 kilometres northeast of Stockholm, Sweden.

The championship course was set up with par 72.

== Format ==
Each team consisted of 6 players, playing two rounds of stroke-play over two days, counting the five best scores each day for each team.

The eight best teams formed flight A, in knock-out match-play over the next three days. The teams were seeded based on their positions after the stroke play. The first placed team were drawn to play the quarter-final against the eight placed team, the second against the seventh, the third against the sixth and the fourth against the fifth. Teams were allowed to use six players during the team matches, selecting four of them in the two morning foursome games and five players in to the afternoon single games. Teams knocked out after the quarter-finals were allowed to play one foursome game and four single games in each of their remaining matches. Games all square at the 18th hole were declared halved, if the team match was already decided.

The eight teams placed 9–16 in the qualification stroke-play formed flight B, to play similar knock-out play, with one foursome game and four single games in each match, to decide their final positions.

The four teams placed 17–20 formed flight C, to play each other in a round-robin system, with one foursome game and four single games in each match, to decide their final positions.

== Teams ==
20 nation teams contested the event, the same number of teams as at the previous event one year earlier. Slovakia took part for the first time. Each team consisted of six players.

Players in the teams

Country	Players
Austria	Moritz Mayrhauser, Philipp Fendt, Bernard Neumayer, Florian Sander, Manuel Trappel, Christoph Weninger
Belgium	Maxence de Craecker, Xavier Feyaerts, Christopher Mivis, Stefan Quy, Julien Richelle, Pierre-Alexis Rolland
Denmark	Lucas Bjerregaard, Joachim B. Hansen, Andreas Hartø, Rasmus Lykke-Kjeldsen, Daniel Løkke, Morten Ørum Madsen
England	Laurie Canter, Tommy Fleetwood, Billy Hemstock, Tom Lewis, Chris Paisley, Eddie Pepperell
Finland	Toni Hakula, Tapio Pulkkanen, Mikael Salminen, Kalle Samooja, Henri Satama, Miro Veijalainen
France	Clément Berardo, Victor Dubuisson, Jérôme Lando-Casanova, Alexander Lévy, Johan Lopez Lazaro, Romain Wattel
Germany	Sean Einhaus, Maximilian Kieffer, Alexander Knappe, Benedict Staben, Alexis Szappanos, Philipp Westermann
Iceland	Axel Bóasson, Kristjan Einarsson, Hlynur Hjartarson, Alfred Brynjar Kristinsson, Ólafur Loftsson, Sigmundur Masson
Ireland	Clan Curley, Paul Cutler, Alan Dunbar, Paul Dunne, Dara Lernihan, Pat Murray
Italy	Nino Bertasio, Andrea Bolognesi, Mattia Miloro, Leonardo Motto, Andrea Pavan, Niccolò Quintarelli
Netherlands	Floris de Haas, Robin Kind, Wouter de Vries, Darius van Driel, Daan Huizing, Jeroen Krietemeijer
Norway	Elias Bertheussen, Knut Børsheim, Are Friestad, Espen Kofstad, Joakim Mikkelsen, Ole Ramsnes
Poland	Tomasz Gajewski, Adrian Meronk, Sebastian Musiolik, Daniel Snoey, Wojciech Swiniarski, Piotr Ragankiewicz
Portugal	Pedro Figueiredo, Miguel Gaspar, Nuno Henriques, José Maria Jóia, Tiago Rodrigues, Manuel Violas
Scotland	James Byrne, Ross Kellett, Philip Mclean, Kris Nicol, Greg Paterson, Michael Stewart
Slovakia	Oliver Benda, Maros Karnis, Stefan Palenik, Martin Tavoda, Peter Valasek, Juraj Zvarik
Spain	Emilio Cuartero, Nacho Elvira, Antonio Hortal, Carlos Pigem, Gerhard Piris, Juan Francisco Sarasti
Sweden	Nils Florén, Jesper Kennegård, David Lingmerth, Henrik Norlander, Pontus Widegren, Robin Wingårdh
Switzerland	Marc Dobias, Benjamim Rusch, Arthur Gabella, Edouard Amacher, Victor Doka, Marco Iten, Ken Benz, Roberto Francioni, Marc Dobias, Oliver Gilmartin, Steven Rojas, Benjamin Rusch
Wales	Rhys Enoch, Oliver Farr, James Frazer, Alastair Jones, Rhys Pugh, Ben Westgate

== Winners ==
Tied leaders of the opening 36-hole competition were team Denmark and team Italy, each with a 1-over-par score of 721. Denmark earned first place on the tie breaking better non-counting scores. Host nation Sweden, tied 14th after the first round, was close to miss the quarter-finals, but finally, by a single stroke, took the last place among the top eight, ahead of three teams. Sweden eventually came close to winning the championship. Defending champions Scotland were among the teams which finished one stroke from qualifying for the quarter-finals.

There was no official award for the lowest individual score, but individual leader was Nino Bertasio, Italy, with a 10-under-par score of 134, four strokes ahead of Morten Ørum Madsen, Denmark.

Team England won the gold medal, earning their tenth title, beating team Sweden in the final 4 1/2–2 1/2.

Team Italy, earned the bronze on third place, after beating Spain 5–2 in the bronze match.

== Results ==
Qualification round

Team standings

Place	Country	Score	To par
T1	Denmark *	355-366=721	+1
T1	Italy	368-353=721	+1
3	England	354-369=723	+3
4	Spain	372-355=727	+7
5	Wales	362-367=729	+9
6	Finland	359-372=731	+11
7	Germany	367-368=735	+15
8	Sweden	374-366=740	+20
T9	France *	369-372=741	+21
T9	Scotland *	359-382=741	+21
T9	Portugal	373-368=741	+21
12	Norway	368-376=741	+24
13	Netherlands	369-379=748	+28
14	Belgium	370-381=751	+31
T15	Ireland *	374-383=757	+37
T15	Switzerland	381-376=757	+37
17	Austria	379-386=765	+45
18	Iceland	383-387=770	+50
19	Slovakia	395-404=799	+79
20	Poland	391-421 =812	+92

* Note: In the event of a tie the order was determined by the best total of the two non-counting scores of the two rounds.

Individual leaders

Place	Player	Country	Score	To par
1	Nino Bertasio	Italy	68-66=134	−10
2	Morten Ørum Madsen	Denmark	69-69=138	−6
T3	James Byrne	Scotland	70-69=139	−5
T3	Mikael Salminen	Finland	71-68=139	−5
T5	Laurie Canter	England	70-72=142	−2
T5	James Frazer	Wales	70-72=142	−2
T5	Espen Kofstad	Norway	71-71=142	−2
T5	Andrea Pavan	Italy	73-69=142	−2
T5	Carlos Pigem	Spain	71-71=142	−2
T9	Oliver Farr	Wales	73-70=143	−1
T9	Rasmus Lykke-Kjeldsen	Denmark	69-74=143	−1
T9	Chris Paisley	England	68-75=143	−1
T9	Kalle Samooja	Finland	67-76=143	−1
T9	Alexis Szappanos	Germany	73-70=143	−1

Note: There was no official award for the lowest individual score.

Flight A

Bracket

Quarter finals
Italy	4
Germany	3
England	5
Finland	2
Spain	6
Wales	1
Sweden	4.5
Denmark	2.5

Semi finals
England	5
Italy	2
Sweden	5.5
Spain	1.5

Final
England	4.5
Sweden	2.5
Bronze match
Italy	5
Spain	2

Elimination matches
Finland	3.5
Germany	1.5
Denmark	3.5
Wales	1.5

Match for 5th place
Denmark	3
Finland	2
Match for 7th place
Germany	4
Wales	1

Final games

England	Sweden
4.5	2.5
E. Pepperell / B. Hemstock	P. Widegren / H. Norlander 3 & 2
T. Fleetwood / T. Lewis	D. Lingmerth / N. Florén 2 & 1
Tommy Fleetwood 2 & 1	Jespeer Kennegård
Tom Lewis 1 hole	Nils Florén
Laurie Canter 6 & 4	Pontus Widegren
Eddie Pepperell 4 & 3	David Lingmerth
Chris Paisley AS *	Henrik Norlander AS *

* Note: Game declared halved, since team match already decided.

Flight B

Bracket

Round 1
Scotland	3.5
Ireland	1.5
Portugal	3.5
Belgium	1.5
Netherlands	3.5
Norway	1.5
France	4
Switzerland	1

Round 2
Scotland	3
Portugal	2
France	4
Netherlands	1

Match for 9th place
France	4
Scotland	1
Match for 11th place
Netherlands	4
Portugal	1

Elimination matches
Ireland	3.5
Belgium	1.5
Norway	4
Switzerland	1

Match for 13th place
Norway	3.5
Ireland	1.5
Match for 15th place
Belgium	4
Switzerland	1

Flight C

First round

Iceland	Slovakia
5	0

Austria	Poland
5	0

Second round

Iceland	Poland
5	0

Slovakia	Austria
3	2

Third round

Poland	Slovakia
4	1

Austria	Iceland
3	2

Final standings

Place	Country
1st place, gold medalist(s)	England
2nd place, silver medalist(s)	Sweden
3rd place, bronze medalist(s)	Italy
4	Spain
5	Denmark
6	Finland
7	Germany
8	Wales
9	France
10	Scotland
11	Netherlands
12	Portugal
13	Norway
14	Ireland
15	Belgium
16	Switzerland
17	Iceland
18	Austria
19	Poland
20	Slovakia

== See also ==
- European Golf Association – Organizer of European amateur golf championships
- Eisenhower Trophy – biennial world amateur team golf championship for men organized by the International Golf Federation.
- European Ladies' Team Championship – European amateur team golf championship for women organised by the European Golf Association.
