= 2007 European Amateur Team Championship =

Golf competition

Tournament information
- Dates: 3–7 July 2007
- Location: Irvine, North Ayrshire, Scotland, United Kingdom; 55.5950°N 04.6595°W
- Course: Western Gailes Golf Club
- Organized by: European Golf Association
- Format: Qualification round: 36 holes stroke play Knock-out match-play

Statistics
- Par: 71
- Length: 7,014 yards (6,414 m)
- Field: 20 teams 120 players

Champion
- Ireland; Jonathan Caldwell, Shane Lowry, Richard Kilpatrick, Rory McIlroy, Gareth Shaw, Simon Ward
- Qualification round: 712 (+2); Final match: 4 1/2–2 1/2

Location map
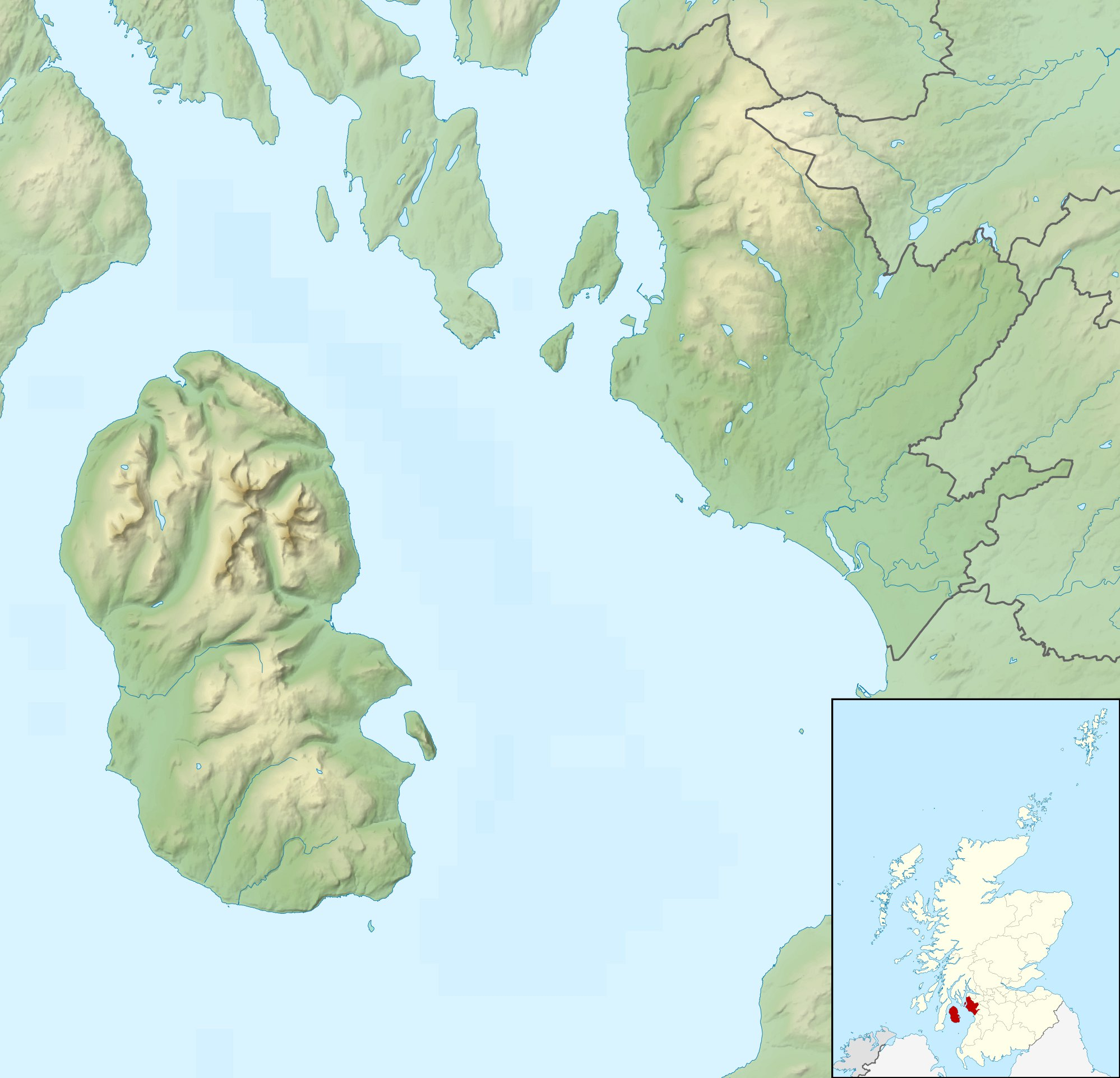
- Location in Europe Location on the British Isles Location in Scotland Location in North Ayrshire

The 2007 European Amateur Team Championship took place 3–7 July at Western Gailes Golf Club in Irvine, Scotland, United Kingdom. It was the 25th men's golf European Amateur Team Championship.

== Venue ==
The club was founded in 1897. Its 18 hole links course on the Ayrshire coast in Irvine, North Ayrshire, 50 kilometres south west of the city center of Glasgow, was ready in 1899 and remained largely unmodified from its original layout. It is situated closely north of Royal Troon Golf Club and Prestwick Golf Club.

== Format ==
Each team consisted of 6 players, playing two rounds of stroke-play over two days, counting the five best scores each day for each team.

The eight best teams formed flight A, in knock-out match-play over the next three days. The teams were seeded based on their positions after the stroke play. The first placed team were drawn to play the quarter-final against the eight placed team, the second against the seventh, the third against the sixth and the fourth against the fifth. Teams were allowed to use six players during the team matches, selecting four of them in the two morning foursome games and five players in to the afternoon single games. Teams knocked out after the quarter-finals played one foursome game and four single games in each of their remaining matches. Games all square at the 18th hole were declared halved, if the team match was already decided.

The eight teams placed 9–16 in the qualification stroke-play formed flight B, to play similar knock-out play, with one foursome game and four single games in each match, to decide their final positions.

The four teams placed 17–20 formed flight C, to play each other in a round-robin system, with one foursome game and four single games in each match, to decide their final positions.

== Teams ==
20 nation teams contested the event, the same number of teams as at the previous event two years earlier. Turkey took part for the first time. Each team consisted of six players.

Players in the teams

Country	Players
Austria	Hans Peter Bacher, Juergen Friessnegg, Tano Kromer, Wolfgang Rieder, Philipp Sharma, Johannes Steiner
Belgium	Xavier Feyaerts, Patrick Hanauer, Hugues Joannes, Christopher Mivis, Pierre Relecom, Guillaume Watremez
Czech Republic	Miroslav Holub, Tomas Kamas, Marek Novy, Jan Prokop, Jan Sedmicek, Lukas Tintera
Denmark	Peter Baunsoe, Morten Ørum Madsen, Jacob Roth, Kristian Grud, Philip Drost, Rasmus Hjelm Nielsen
England	Gary Boyd, David Horsey, Jamie Moul, John Parry, Paul Waring, Gary Wolstenholme
Finland	Joonas Granberg, Mikael Salminen, Henri Satama, Tuomas Pollari, Tuomas Sistonen, Miro Veijalainen
France	Romain Bechu, Adrian Bernardet, Victor Dubuisson, Alexandre Kaleka, Kenny Le Sager, Jean Wolff
Germany	Florian Fritsch, Stephan Gross, Jonas Koelbing, Frederik Schulte, Benjamin Sigl, Philipp Westermann
Iceland	Kristjan Einarsson, Örn Ævar Hjartarson, Sigurthor Jonsson, Sigmundur Einar Masson, Stefan Mar Stefansson, Olafur Loftsson
Ireland	Jonathan Caldwell, Shane Lowry, Richard Kilpatrick, Rory McIlroy, Gareth Shaw, Simon Ward
Italy	Federico Colombo, Marco Guerisoli, Nunzio Lombardi, Leonardo Motta, Benedetto Pastore, Andrea Pavan
Netherlands	Tristan Bierenbroodspot, Darius Van Driel, Richard Kind, Tim Sluiter, Jurrian Van der Vaart, Floris de Vries
Norway	Knut Børsheim, Fredrik Kollevold, Anders Kristiansen, Markus Leandersson, Andre Thorsen, Marius Thorp
Portugal	Joao Carlota, Pedro Figueiredo, Bernardo Frere, Ricardo Gouveia, Nuno Henriques, Tiago Rodrigues
Scotland	James Byrne, Jonathan King, Kevin McAlpine, Keir McNicoll, Richie Ramsay, Lloyd Saltman
Spain	Jorge Campillo, Nacho Elvira, Pedro Erice, Jesus Lagarrea, Juan Sarasti, Inigo Urquizo
Sweden	Jonas Blixt, Jesper Kennegård, Tobias Rosendahl, Joel Sjöholm, Robin Wingårdh, Björn Åkesson
Switzerland	Ken Benz, Nicolas D'Incau, Marc Dobias, Sandro Tan-Piaget, Steven Rojas, Tino Weiss
Turkey	Mustafa Hocaoglu, Gencer Ozcan, Hamza Sayin, Deha Senay, Afay Varli, Koray Varli
Wales	Rhys Davies, Nigel Edwards, Rhys Enoch, Craig Evans, Llewellyn Matthews, Ryan Thomas

== Winners ==
Defending champions and nine-time-winners team England won the opening 36-hole competition, with a 7-under-par score of 703. Tied five strokes behind were host nation Scotland and team France. Scotland earned 2nd place on the tiebreaking better non-counting scores.

There was no official award for the lowest individual score, but individual leaders were Kevin McAlpine, Scotland, Rory McIlroy, Ireland and Paul Waring, England, each with a 6-under-par score of 136, two strokes ahead of Jesper Kennegård, Sweden, and Morten Ørum Madsen, Denmark.

Team Ireland won the gold medal, earning their fifth title and first since 1987, beating team France in the final 4 1/2–2 1/2. The winning Irish team, combined from the Republic of Ireland and Northern Ireland, included two future professional major winners, 18-year-old Rory McIlroy and 20-year-old Shane Lowry.

Team Scotland, earned the bronze on third place, after beating neighbor nation England 4–3 in the bronze match.

== Results ==
Qualification round

Team standings

Place	Country	Score	To par
1	England	355-348=703	−7
T2	Scotland *	359-349=708	−2
T2	France	353-355=708	−2
4	Ireland	358-354=712	+2
5	Sweden	367-350=717	+7
6	Wales	368-353=721	+11
7	Spain	365-358=723	+13
8	Denmark	358-366=724	+14
9	Norway	360-368=728	+18
10	Netherlands	370-359=729	+19
11	Germany	365-367=732	+22
12	Portugal	370-375=745	+35
13	Austria	376-372=748	+38
14	Belgium	379-371=350	+40
15	Finland	385-366=351	+41
16	Switzerland	386-368=754	+44
17	Italy	383-373=756	+46
18	Turkey	380-381=761	+51
19	Iceland	376-390=766	+56
20	Czech Republic	382-389=771	+61

* Note: In the event of a tie the order was determined by the best total of the two non-counting scores of the two rounds.

Individual leaders

Place	Player	Country	Score	To par
T1	Kevin McAlpine	Scotland	68-68=136	−6
T1	Rory McIlroy	Ireland	67-69=136	−6
T1	Paul Waring	England	68-68=136	−6
T4	Jesper Kennegård	Sweden	70-68=138	−4
T4	Morten Ørum Madsen	Denmark	67-71=138	−4
T6	Jonathan Caldwell	Ireland	74-65=139	−3
T6	Richie Ramsay	Scotland	70-69=139	−3
T6	Gary Wholstenholme	England	70-69=139	−3
T9	Adrien Bernadet	France	70-70=140	−2
T9	Gencer Ozcan	Turkey	70-70=140	−2
T9	Inigo Urquizo	Spain	70-70=140	−2
T9	Jurrian Van der Vaart	Netherlands	71-69=140	−2

Note: There was no official award for the lowest individual scores.

Flight A

Bracket

Quarter finals
Scotland	4
Spain	3
France	5
Wales	2
Ireland	6
Sweden	1
England	5.5
Denmark	1.5

Semi finals
France	4.5
Scotland	2.5
Ireland	4
England	3

Final
Ireland	4.5
France	2.5
Bronze match
Scotland	4
England	3

Elimination matches
Spain	3
Wales	2
Denmark	3
Sweden	2

Match for 5th place
Spain	4.5
Denmark	0.5
Match for 7th place
Sweden	3
Wales	2

Final games

Ireland	France
4.5	2.5
R. McIlroy / J. Caldwell	A. Kaleka / A. Bernadet 5 & 4
S. Lowry / R. Kilpatrick 2 holes	J. Wolffe / K. Le Sager
Rory McIlroy	Romain Bechu 3 & 2
Shane Lowry 5 & 4	Victor Dubuisson
Richard Kilpatrick 3 & 2	Adrien Bernadet
Jonathan Caldwell 3 & 2	Alexandre Kaleka
Simon Ward AS *	Jean Wolffe AS *

* Note: Game declared halved, since team match already decided.

Flight B

Bracket

Round 1
Netherlands	4
Finland	1
Germany	4.5
Belgium	0.5
Portugal	3
Austria	2
Norway	3.5
Switzerland	1.5

Round 2
Netherlands	5
Germany	0
Norway	3
Portugal	2

Match for 9th place
Norway	3
Netherlands	2
Match for 11th place
Germany	3
Portugal	2

Elimination matches
Belgium	4
Finland	1
Austria	3
Switzerland	2

Match for 13th place
Belgium	3
Austria	2
Match for 15th place
Finland	3.5
Switzerland	1.5

Flight C

First round

Iceland	Turkey
3	2

Czech Republic	Italy
3	2

Second round

Czech Republic	Turkey
3	2

Italy	Iceland
3	2

Third round

Iceland	Czech Republic
3	2

Italy	Turkey
3	2

Final standings

Place	Country
1st place, gold medalist(s)	Ireland
2nd place, silver medalist(s)	France
3rd place, bronze medalist(s)	Scotland
4	England
5	Spain
6	Denmark
7	Sweden
8	Wales
9	Norway
10	Netherlands
11	Germany
12	Portugal
13	Belgium
14	Austria
15	Finland
16	Switzerland
17	Iceland
18	Italy
19	Czech Republic
20	Turkey

== See also ==
- European Golf Association – Organizer of European amateur golf championships
- Eisenhower Trophy – biennial world amateur team golf championship for men organized by the International Golf Federation.
- European Ladies' Team Championship – European amateur team golf championship for women organised by the European Golf Association.
