= Knut Børsheim =

Norwegian professional golfer

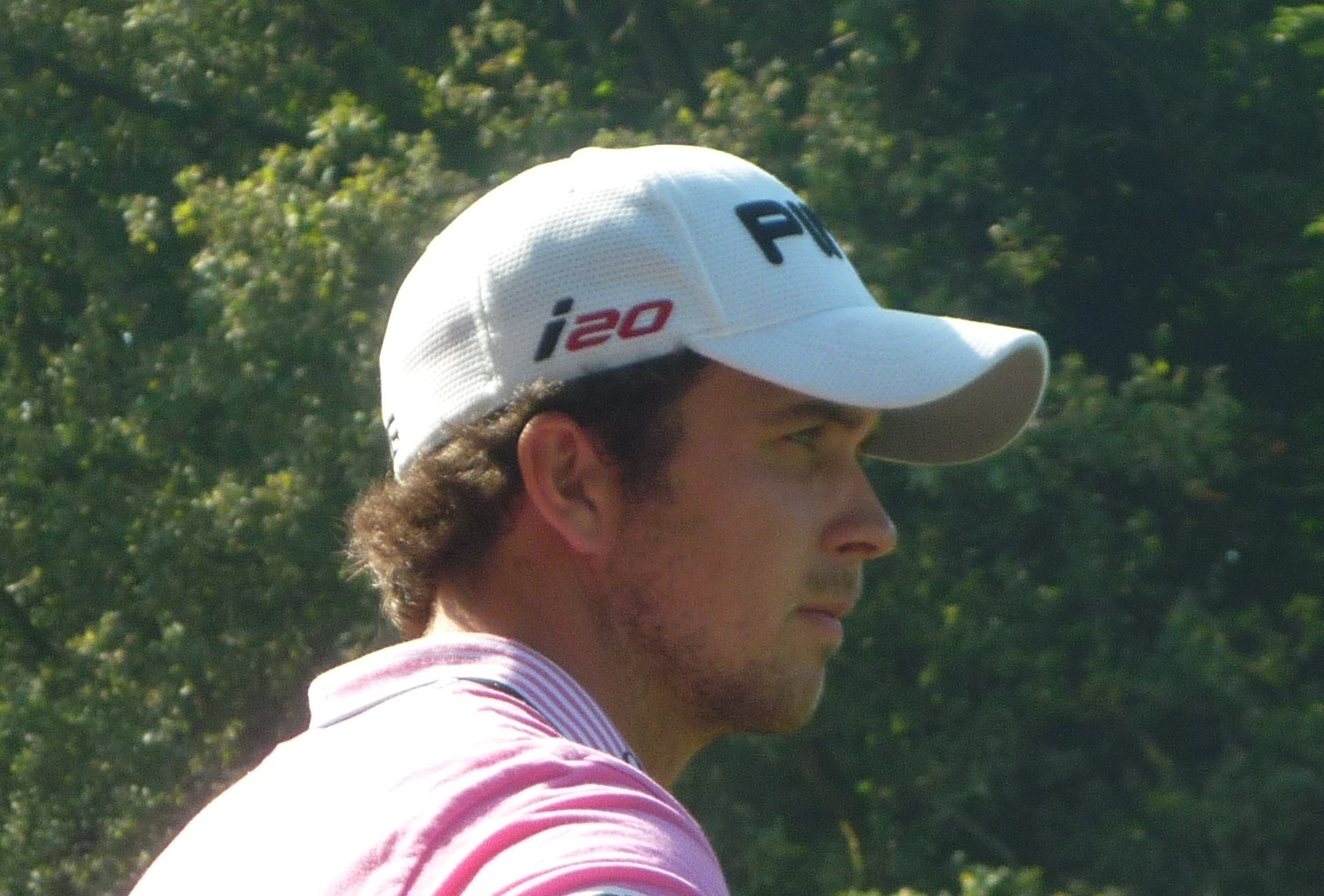
- Børsheim at the 2012 KLM Open

Personal information
- Nationality: Norway
- Born: 29 April 1987 (age 39)

Career
- Sport: Golf
- College: Arizona State University
- Turned professional: 2010
- Former tours: European Tour; Challenge Tour
- Professional wins: 1

Knut Børsheim (born 29 April 1987) is a Norwegian professional golfer.

== Amateur career ==
Børsheim was one of the top amateurs in Norway, winning the golf medal at the national boys' championships, and winning a professional event in Scandinavia in 2006 while still an amateur.

In the autumn of 2006, he opted to take a golf scholarship to Arizona State University for the next four years. He was awarded the Pac-10 Men's Golf Scholar Athlete of the Year for 2009-10.

While at college, Børsheim represented Norway at the European Amateur Team Championship four years in a row 2007, 2008, 2009 and 2010.

He was named for the 2010 European Bonallack Trophy team against an Asia and Pacific team, but the event was cancelled.

He turned professional upon college graduation in 2010.

== Professional career ==
Børsheim entered PGA Tour qualifying school after turning professional, but missed the final stage, and turned his attention towards Europe. He played on invites on the Challenge Tour for much of 2011, and earned his best result as a professional when he finished as runner-up at the Kazakhstan Open, the richest event on that tour. Børsheim finished just outside the top twenty players at season's end who earn promotion to the European Tour. However, he put that disappointment behind him by coming through European qualifying school to earn his full tour card for 2012.

In 2012, Børsheim finished 167th on the European Tour and returned to the Challenge Tour. In 2013, he finished 49th on the Challenge Tour and retired from touring golf. He then went to work in stockbroking for a bank in Oslo. In a 2014 interview, he said that he left professional golf because he "didn't really enjoy the travelling side of things".

== Amateur wins ==
- 2009 Norwegian Amateur

== Professional wins (1) ==
=== Nordic Golf League wins (1) ===
| No. | Date | Tournament | Winning score | Margin of victory | Runner-up |
|---|---|---|---|---|---|
| 1 | 3 Sep 2006 | Hydro-Texaco Open (as an amateur) | −5 (70-74-67=211) | 4 strokes | (Denmark) Morten Hedegaard |

== Team appearances ==
Amateur

- European Boys' Team Championship (representing Norway): 2003, 2004, 2005
- Jacques Léglise Trophy (representing Continental Europe): 2004
- Eisenhower Trophy (representing Norway): 2006, 2008
- European Amateur Team Championship (representing Norway): 2007, 2008, 2009, 2010

== See also ==
- 2011 European Tour Qualifying School graduates
