= Federico Colombo =

Italian professional golfer (born 1987)

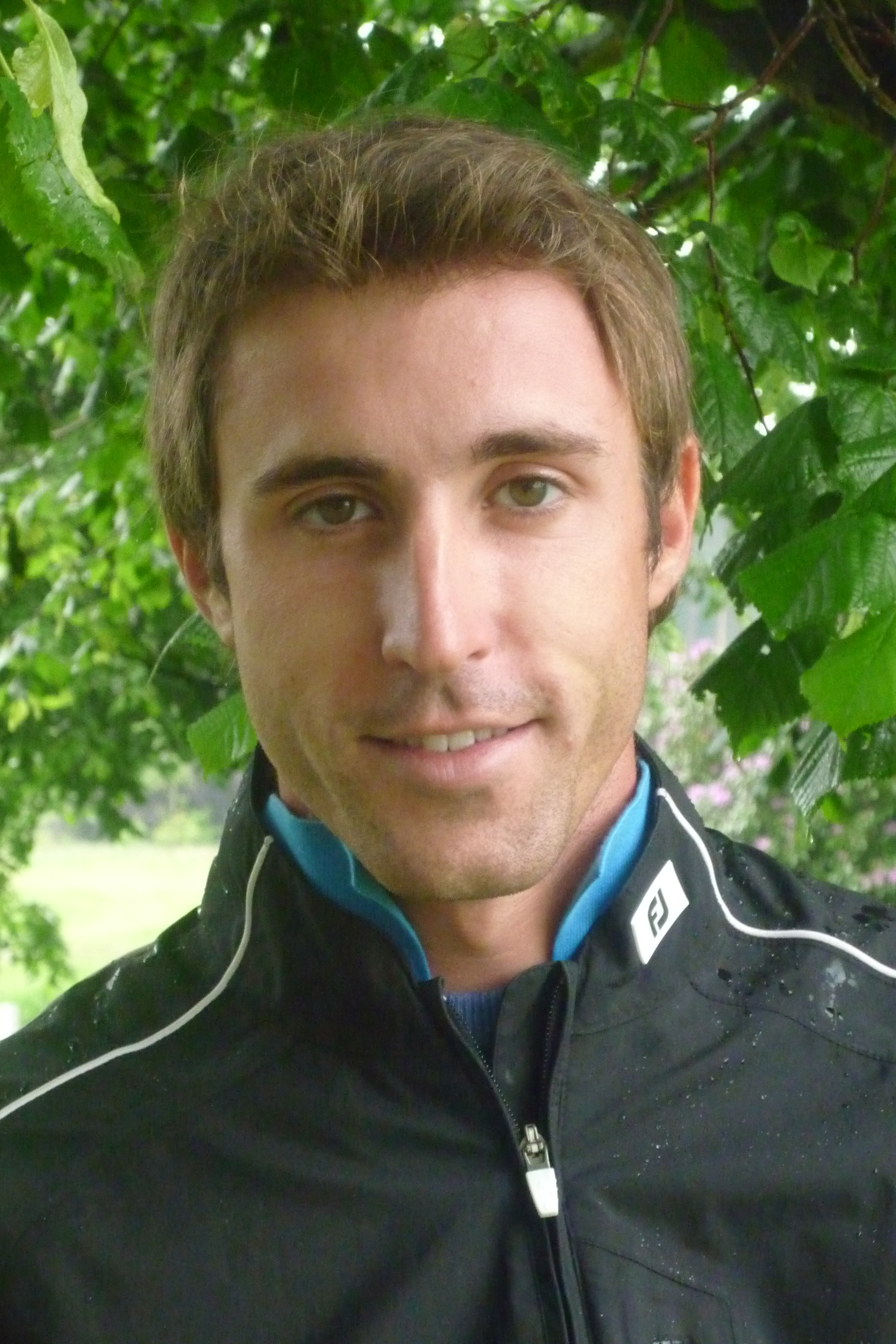

Personal information
- Nationality: Italy
- Born: 6 December 1987 (age 38) Giussano, Italy
- Height: 5 ft 9 in (1.75 m)
- Weight: 149 lb (68 kg; 10.6 st)

Career
- Sport: Golf
- College: University of Arkansas
- Turned professional: 2008
- Former tours: European Tour; Challenge Tour

Federico Colombo (born 6 December 1987) is an Italian professional golfer who plays on the European Tour.

== Early life and amateur career ==
Colombo won several junior amateur events in his home country before taking up a golf scholarship to the University of Arkansas in 2007. He spent a year in Arkansas before leaving school.

== Professional career ==
In 2008, he turned pro. He reached the final stage of qualifying school for the European Tour. Playing the final stage as his first professional tournament, Colombo finished T-29th and earned a place on the European Tour for 2009. After a slow start, making only one cut, Colombo concentrated on the second-tier Challenge Tour, and subsequently played full-time at that level for two further seasons, with a best result of T2nd in the 2010 Kazakhstan Open. In 2011, he recorded eight top ten finishes in 20 events to finish seventh in the rankings and secure a return to the European Tour.

== Amateur wins ==
- 2003 Italian U-16 Amateur Championship
- 2005 Italian U-18 Amateur Championship
- 2006 Italian Boys Championship
- 2007 Italian U-21 Amateur Championship

== Team appearances ==
Amateur

- Jacques Léglise Trophy (representing Continental Europe): 2003
- European Boys' Team Championship (representing Italy): 2003 (winners), 2004
- European Youths' Team Championship (representing Italy): 2006
- Eisenhower Trophy (representing Italy): 2006, 2008
- European Amateur Team Championship (representing Italy): 2007, 2008

== See also ==
- 2008 European Tour Qualifying School graduates
- 2011 Challenge Tour graduates
