= Reinier Saxton =

Dutch professional golfer (born 1988)

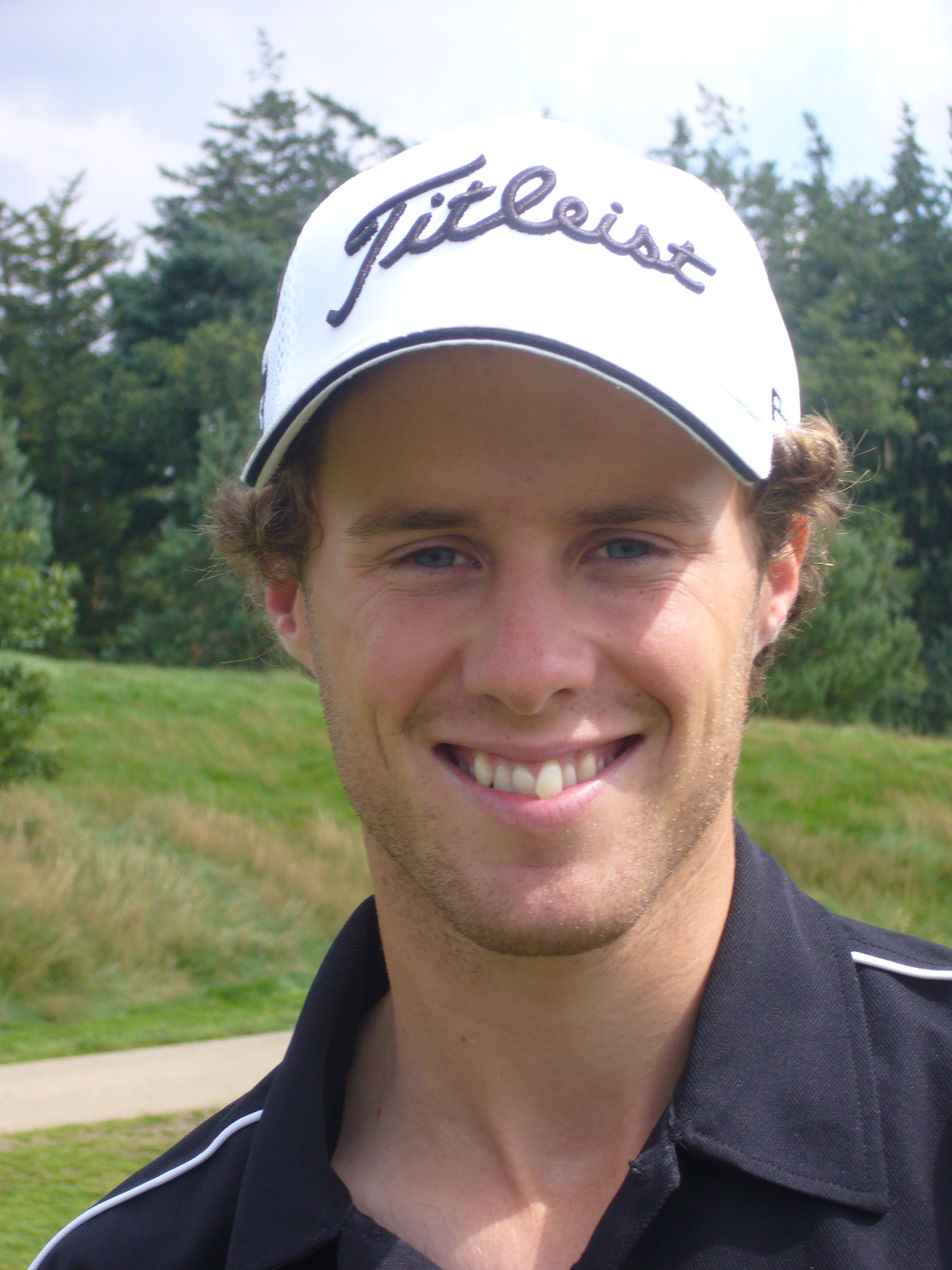

Personal information
- Nationality: Netherlands
- Born: 10 February 1988 (age 38) Amstelveen, Netherlands

Career
- Sport: Golf
- Turned professional: 2009
- Current tour: Challenge Tour
- Former tours: European Tour; Pro Golf Tour
- Professional wins: 5

Best results in major championships
- Masters Tournament: CUT: 2009
- PGA Championship: DNP
- U.S. Open: DNP
- The Open Championship: CUT: 2008

Achievements and awards
- EPD Tour Order of Merit winner: 2011

Reinier Saxton (born 10 February 1988) is a Dutch professional golfer.

Saxton was born in Amstelveen, the son of Jonas Saxton, who used to play on the Challenge Tour and who is now a coach at the Dutch Federation and one of the founders of The Dutch golf course.

== Amateur career ==
Saxton had a successful amateur career. At the age of 15, he won the National Championship Matchplay for the first of five times. He won The Amateur Championship at Turnberry in 2008, the second Dutchman to do so after Rolf Muntz in 1990 at Muirfield. He played the next Open Championship and the Masters Tournament, and won the Spanish Amateur in Sevilla in 2009.

== Professional career ==
Saxton turned professional in July 2009 and was allowed to play six tournaments on the Challenge Tour. He cashed his first prize money at the Scottish Hydro Challenge, finishing 21st. He also played a few events on the NGA Hooters Tour and went to the European Tour qualifying School.

In 2011, Saxton played the third-tier Pro Golf Tour, then known as the EPD Tour. He won three tournaments and got promoted to the Challenge Tour for 2012. He then earned a European Tour card at qualifying school.

== Amateur wins ==
- 2008 Amateur Championship
- 2009 Spanish International Amateur Championship

== Professional wins (5) ==
=== Pro Golf Tour wins (5) ===
No.	Date	Tournament	Winning score	Margin of victory	Runner(s)-up
1	24 Feb 2011	Al Maaden Classic	−13 (65-67-71=203)	2 strokes	(Germany) Bernd Ritthammer
2	15 Apr 2011	Auto Hall Open	−9 (67-67-70=204)	2 strokes	(Czech Republic) Marek Nový, (Switzerland) Nicolas Sulzer
3	30 Jun 2011	Haus Bey Classic	−8 (66-68-71=205)	1 stroke	(Germany) Marcel Haremza
4	14 Jan 2015	Red Sea Egyptian Classic	−10 (67-71-68=206)	3 strokes	(Scotland) Ross Cameron, (Switzerland) Benjamin Rusch
5	7 Jun 2015	St. Pölten Pro Golf Tour	−14 (65-65-69=199)	1 stroke	(Germany) Philipp Mejow

== Results in major championships ==
Tournament	2008	2009
Masters Tournament		CUT
The Open Championship	CUT	

Note: Saxton never played in the U.S. Open or the PGA Championship.

Did not play

CUT = missed the half-way cut

== Team appearances ==
Amateur

- European Boys' Team Championship (representing the Netherlands): 2003, 2004, 2005 (winners)
- Eisenhower Trophy (representing the Netherlands): 2008
- St Andrews Trophy (representing the Continent of Europe): 2008
- European Amateur Team Championship (representing the Netherlands): 2008, 2009

== See also ==
- 2011 European Tour Qualifying School graduates
