= Jonathan Caldwell =

Northern Irish golfer (born 1984)

Personal information
- Full name: Jonathan James Caldwell
- Nationality: Northern Ireland
- Born: 10 June 1984 (age 42) Bangor, County Down, Northern Ireland
- Height: 1.75 m (5 ft 9 in)
- Weight: 76 kg (168 lb; 12.0 st)

Career
- Sport: Golf
- College: University of South Alabama
- Turned professional: 2008
- Current tour: Challenge Tour
- Former tours: European Tour; PGA EuroPro Tour
- Professional wins: 5

Number of wins by tour
- European Tour: 1
- Other: 4

Jonathan James Caldwell (born 10 June 1984) is a professional golfer from Northern Ireland.

== Amateur career ==
Caldwell attended the University of South Alabama from 2004 to 2008. He competed in the 2007 Walker Cup.

== Professional career ==
Caldwell played on the 2009 European Tour, but did not perform well enough to retain his card. He played a number of events on the Challenge Tour in 2009, 2010 and 2011. From 2012 to 2017 he played mostly on the PGA EuroPro Tour, winning tournaments in 2016 and 2017. He finished fifth in the 2017 Order of Merit to earn a place on the Challenge Tour for 2018.

In June 2021, Caldwell claimed his breakthrough win at the Scandinavian Mixed, an event co-sanctioned by the Ladies European Tour. Caldwell had not previously finished better than 5th on the European Tour.

== Professional wins (5) ==
=== European Tour wins (1) ===
No.	Date	Tournament	Winning score	Margin of victory	Runner-up
1	13 Jun 2021	Scandinavian Mixed^{1}	−17 (70-67-70-64=271)	1 stroke	(Spain) Adrián Otaegui

^{1}Mixed event with the Ladies European Tour

=== PGA EuroPro Tour wins (2) ===
No.	Date	Tournament	Winning score	Margin of victory	Runner-up
1	23 Sep 2016	Clipper Logistics Championship	−10 (70-64-69=203)	1 stroke	(England) Kevin Harper
2	21 Jul 2017	Cobra Puma Golf Championship	−9 (66-72-69=207)	2 strokes	(England) Jason Timmis

=== Evolve Pro Tour wins (2) ===
No.	Date	Tournament	Winning score	Margin of victory	Runners-up
1	15 Feb 2018	El Valle Open	−7 (73-66-67=206)	3 strokes	(Slovenia) Pia Babnik (a), (Norway) Eirik Tage Johansen
2	8 Feb 2023	Lo Romero Open	−13 (65-68-70=203)	Playoff	(Scotland) Darren Howie, (Republic of Ireland) Patrick Keeling (a)

== Team appearances ==
Amateur

- European Boys' Team Championship (representing Ireland): 2002
- European Amateur Team Championship (representing Ireland): 2007 (winners), 2008
- Walker Cup (representing Great Britain & Ireland): 2007
- Palmer Cup (representing Europe): 2008 (winners)
- St Andrews Trophy (representing Great Britain & Ireland): 2008 (winners)
- Eisenhower Trophy (representing Ireland): 2008

== See also ==
- 2008 European Tour Qualifying School graduates
- 2019 European Tour Qualifying School graduates
