= Joachim B. Hansen =

Danish professional golfer (born 1990)

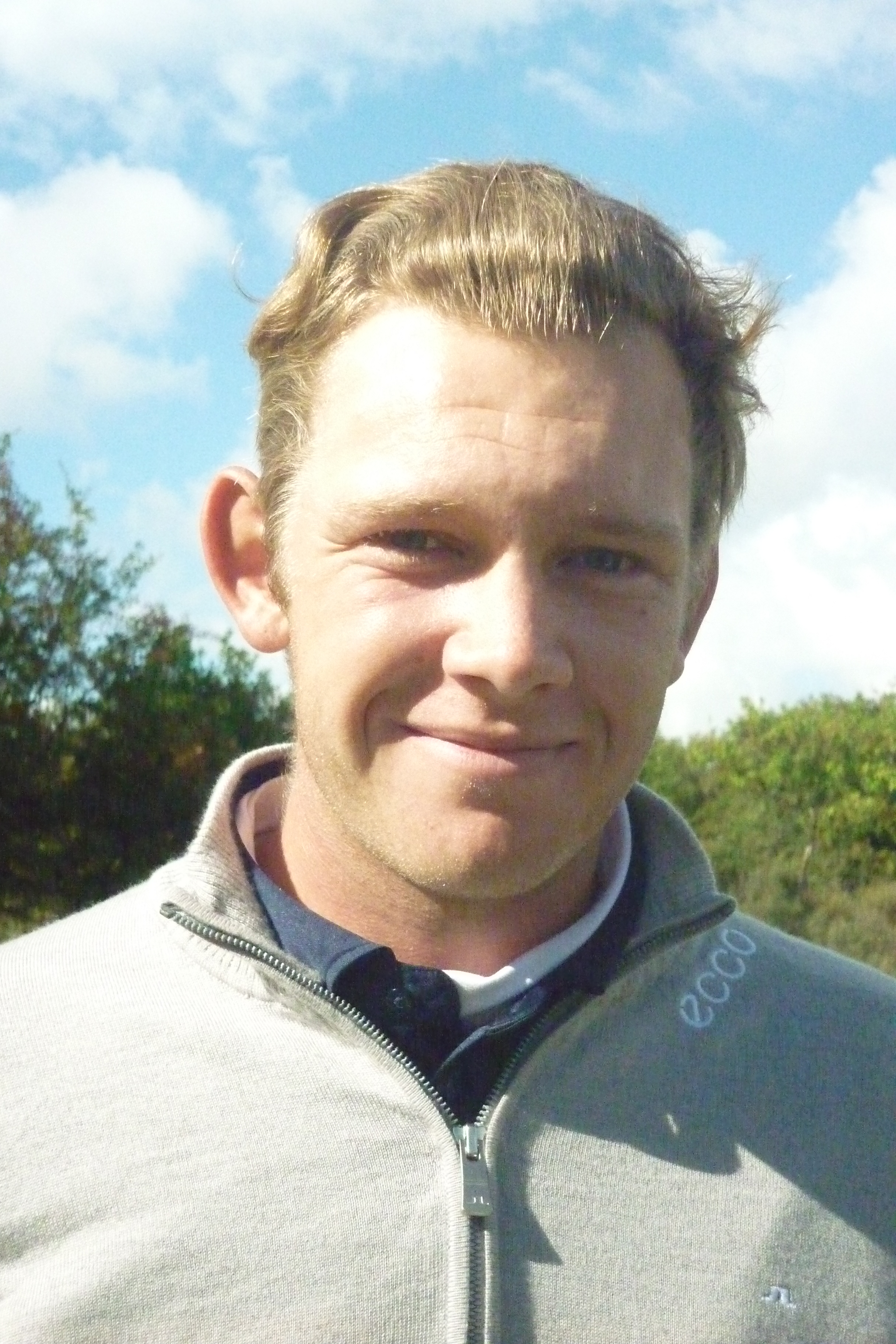

Personal information
- Full name: Joachim Brandt Hansen
- Nationality: Denmark
- Born: 18 August 1990 (age 36) Hillerød, Denmark
- Height: 1.87 m (6 ft 2 in)
- Weight: 75 kg (165 lb; 11.8 st)

Career
- Sport: Golf
- Turned professional: 2010
- Current tour: Nordic Golf League
- Former tours: European Tour; Challenge Tour
- Professional wins: 6

Number of wins by tour
- European Tour: 2
- Sunshine Tour: 1
- Challenge Tour: 2
- Other: 2

Achievements and awards
- Den Gyldne Golfbold: 2010
- Challenge Tour Rankings winner: 2018

Joachim Brandt Hansen (born 18 August 1990) is a Danish professional golfer who currently plays on the European Tour.

== Early life and amateur career ==
Hansen was born in Hillerød. He took up golf at the age of 12 enjoyed a successful amateur career which culminated with representing his country, and being the lowest-scoring player in the 2010 Eisenhower Trophy.

== Professional career ==
Hansen turned professional following this performance, earning a place on the Challenge Tour after three runner-up finishes on the third-tier Nordic League in 2011.

A further three runner-up finishes at Challenge Tour level, during Hansen's rookie 2012 season, earned him fourth place in the season-ending rankings and a further promotion to the European Tour. In 2013, Hansen managed to finish in a tie for third at the Aberdeen Asset Management Scottish Open, where he briefly led late in the final round despite carding a quadruple-bogey nine at his second hole.

In 2019, Hansen finished second at the Amundi Open de France, one stroke behind Nicolas Colsaerts.

Hansen's first victory on the European Tour came in November 2020, where he shot a final round 67 to win the Joburg Open. He won the Aviv Dubai Championship in November 2021 to claim his second victory on the European Tour.

== Amateur wins ==
- 2010 Eisenhower Trophy (individual leader), Finnish Amateur

== Professional wins (6) ==
=== European Tour wins (2) ===
No.	Date	Tournament	Winning score	Margin of victory	Runner(s)-up
1	22 Nov 2020	Joburg Open^{1}	−19 (66-68-64-67=265)	2 strokes	(South Africa) Wilco Nienaber
2	14 Nov 2021	Aviv Dubai Championship	−23 (63-67-67-68=265)	1 stroke	(Italy) Francesco Laporta, (Austria) Bernd Wiesberger

^{1}Co-sanctioned by the Sunshine Tour

=== Challenge Tour wins (2) ===
No.	Date	Tournament	Winning score	Margin of victory	Runner(s)-up
1	29 Apr 2018	Turkish Airlines Challenge	−18 (69-66-69-66=270)	3 strokes	(Italy) Lorenzo Gagli, (England) Jack Singh Brar
2	1 Jul 2018	Made in Denmark Challenge	−15 (64-72-63-70=269)	5 strokes	(Finland) Kalle Samooja

Challenge Tour playoff record (0–1)

No.	Year	Tournament	Opponent	Result
1	2018	Swedish Challenge	(England) Oliver Wilson	Lost to par on second extra hole

=== Nordic Golf League wins (2) ===
No.	Date	Tournament	Winning score	Margin of victory	Runner(s)-up
1	18 Jun 2010	Golf Experten Open (as an amateur)	21 pts (2-12-7=21)	4 points	(Sweden) Johan Bjerhag, (Denmark) Rasmus Hjelm Nielsen
2	15 Feb 2018	Mediter Real Estate Masters	−15 (70-64-63=197)	1 stroke	(Denmark) Nicolai Kristensen

== Team appearances ==
Amateur

- European Boys' Team Championship (representing Denmark): 2008
- European Amateur Team Championship (representing Denmark): 2009, 2010
- Eisenhower Trophy (representing Denmark): 2010 (individual leader)

== See also ==
- 2012 Challenge Tour graduates
- 2015 Challenge Tour graduates
- 2018 Challenge Tour graduates
