= 2008 Eisenhower Trophy =

Tournament information
- Dates: 16–19 October
- Location: Adelaide, Australia; 34°55′44″S 138°36′4″E
- Courses: Royal Adelaide Golf Club; The Grange Golf Club (West course)
- Format: 72 holes stroke play

Statistics
- Par: 73 (Royal Adelaide); 72 (Grange)
- Field: 65 teams 192 players

Champion
- Scotland; Callum Macaulay, Wallace Booth & Gavin Dear
- 560 (−20)

Location map
- Location in Australia Location in South Australia

The 2008 Eisenhower Trophy took place 16–19 October at Royal Adelaide Golf Club and on the West course at The Grange Golf Club in Adelaide, Australia. It was the 26th World Amateur Team Championship for the Eisenhower Trophy and the second to be held in Australia. The tournament was a 72-hole stroke play team event with 65 three-man teams. The best two scores for each round counted towards the team total. Each team played two rounds on the two courses. The leading teams played at The Grange Golf Club on the third day and at Royal Adelaide Golf Club on the final day.

Scotland won their first Eisenhower Trophy, nine strokes ahead of the United States, who took the silver medal. Sweden took the bronze medal while France and Italy tied for fourth place. Rickie Fowler had the best 72-hole aggregate of 280, 10 under par.

The 2008 Espirito Santo Trophy was played at The Grange Golf Club one week prior.

== Teams ==
65 teams contested the event. Each team had three played with the exception of Bolivia, Guatemala and Honduras who only has two.

The following table lists the players on the leading teams.

Country	Players
Argentina	Julián Etulain, Jorge Fernández-Valdés, Emiliano Grillo
Australia	Rohan Blizard, Matthew Griffin, Tim Stewart
Belgium	Xavier Feyaerts, Kevin Hesbois, Hugues Joannes
Canada	Jordan Irwin, David Markle, Nick Taylor
Denmark	Lucas Bjerregaard, Morten Ørum Madsen, Rasmus Hjelm Nielsen
England	Luke Goddard, Sam Hutsby, Dale Whitnell
France	Victor Dubuisson, Benjamin Hébert, Alexandre Kaleka
India	Saurabh Bahuguna, Rashid Khan, Gagan Verma
Ireland	Jonathan Caldwell, Paul Cutler, Shane Lowry
Italy	Nino Bertasio, Federico Colombo, Andrea Pavan
Japan	Hideki Matsuyama, Shunsuke Sonoda, Yuki Usami
Netherlands	Floris de Vries, Richard Kind, Reinier Saxton
New Zealand	James Gill, Danny Lee, Jared Pender
Norway	Knut Børsheim, Anders Kristiansen, Espen Kofstad
Scotland	Wallace Booth, Gavin Dear, Callum Macaulay
South Africa	Jacques Blaauw, Dylan Frittelli, Cameron Johnston
South Korea	Kim Bi-o, Kim Woo-hyun, Song Tae-hoon
Spain	Jorge Campillo, Borja Etchart, Pedro Oriol
Sweden	Jesper Kennegård, Henrik Norlander, Pontus Widegren
Thailand	Apichart Papituk, Chanat Sakulpolphaisan, Wasin Sripattranusorn
Turkey	Mustafa Hocaoğlu, Gencer Özcan, Hamza Hakan Sayin
United States	Rickie Fowler, Billy Horschel, Jamie Lovemark
Wales	Nigel Edwards, Rhys Enoch, Ben Westgate

== Results ==
Place	Country	Score	To par
1st place, gold medalist(s)	Scotland	136-137-140-147=560	−20
2nd place, silver medalist(s)	United States	136-137-144-152=569	−11
3rd place, bronze medalist(s)	Sweden	142-140-139-153=574	−6
T4	France	139-148-141-147=575	−5
T4	Italy	147-141-138-149=575	−5
6	Australia	147-137-141-153=578	−2
T7	Netherlands	145-142-142-150=579	−1
T7	Spain	145-141-140-153=579	−1
T9	Argentina	151-135-146-148=580	E
T9	Canada	146-144-142-148=580	E
T11	New Zealand	143-138-142-158=581	+1
T11	South Africa	141-146-144-150=581	+1
T11	Wales	139-144-148-150=581	+1
14	England	145-141-146-150=582	+2
15	South Korea	145-146-146-147=584	+4
16	Belgium	149-146-142-149=586	+6
T17	India	146-146-145-151=588	+8
T17	Norway	151-143-146-148=588	+8
T19	Denmark	148-147-146-148=589	+9
T19	Japan	146-143-144-156=589	+9
T19	Turkey	147-148-145-149=589	+9
22	Ireland	147-142-147-155=591	+11
T23	Chile	150-147-146-149=592	+12
T23	Germany	150-144-145-153=592	+12
T23	Puerto Rico	137-156-152-147=592	+12
26	Singapore	145-152-147-149=593	+13
T27	Austria	148-151-150-146=595	+15
T27	Iceland	150-142-148-155=595	+15
T27	Philippines	150-152-144-149=595	+15
30	Peru	155-146-140-155=596	+16
T31	Chinese Taipei	145-143-147-162=597	+17
T31	Portugal	150-150-145-152=597	+17
33	Mexico	156-145-148-149=598	+18
34	Colombia	144-160-149-149=602	+22
T35	Brazil	148-151-153-151=603	+23
T35	Finland	153-144-154-152=603	+23
37	Costa Rica	144-155-151-155=605	+25
38	China	153-152-150-155=610	+30
39	Czech Republic	151-154-152-154=611	+31
40	Estonia	147-156-156-153=612	+32
41	Uruguay	147-160-154-152=613	+33
T42	Greece	158-150-154-152=614	+34
T42	Thailand	161-152-153-148=614	+34
T44	Slovakia	158-147-153-158=616	+36
T44	Zimbabwe	159-156-147-154=616	+36
46	Guatemala	156-154-151-156=617	+37
47	Pakistan	150-153-154-161=618	+38
T48	Fiji	157-154-151-161=623	+43
T48	Malaysia	159-152-156-156=623	+43
50	United Arab Emirates	153-164-151-156=624	+44
T51	Bermuda	160-155-151-160=626	+46
T51	Bolivia	161-154-157-154=626	+46
53	Hong Kong	160-154-150-163=627	+47
54	Latvia	156-157-153-162=628	+48
55	Saudi Arabia	161-159-155-170=645	+65
56	Egypt	170-155-154-168=647	+67
57	Honduras	158-156-162-173=649	+69
58	Russia	163-164-156-168=651	+71
59	Eswatini	161-157-166-175=659	+79
T60	Cook Islands	167-166-164-166=663	+83
T60	Croatia	159-163-161-180=663	+83
62	Mauritius	168-172-170-166=676	+96
63	Qatar	175-175-172-165=687	+107
64	Bosnia and Herzegovina	196-185-183-194=758	+178
65	Gabon	200-186-203-195=784	+204

== Individual leaders ==
There was no official recognition for the lowest individual scores.

Place	Player	Country	Score	To par
1	Rickie Fowler	United States	68-67-70-75=280	−10
T2	Callum Macaulay	Scotland	67-70-73-72=282	−8
T2	Nick Taylor	Canada	73-71-68-70=282	−8
4	Wallace Booth	Scotland	70-67-69-79=285	−5
5	Sam Hutsby	England	70-72-75-70=287	−3
T6	Nicolás Geyger	Chile	73-70-71-74=288	−2
T6	Pedro Oriol	Spain	73-70-68-77=288	−2
T8	Federico Colombo	Italy	78-71-68-72=289	−1
T8	Jesper Kennegård	Sweden	70-72-68-79=289	−1
T10	Julián Etulain	Argentina	75-68-76-71=290	E
T10	Jorge Fernández-Valdés	Argentina	76-67-70-77=290	E
T10	Dylan Frittelli	South Africa	71-71-72-76=290	E
T10	Matthew Griffin	Australia	72-71-70-77=290	E
