= Henrik Norlander =

Swedish professional golfer (born 1987)

Personal information
- Full name: Henrik Anders Norlander
- Nationality: Sweden
- Born: 25 March 1987 (age 39) Danderyd, Sweden
- Height: 6 ft 4 in (193 cm)
- Weight: 210 lb (95 kg)
- Spouse: Julie Anderson

Career
- Sport: Golf
- College: Augusta State University
- Turned professional: 2011
- Current tour: PGA Tour
- Former tours: Korn Ferry Tour; Challenge Tour eGolf Professional Tour
- Professional wins: 3
- Highest ranking: 96 (14 February 2021) (as of 25 October 2026)

Number of wins by tour
- Korn Ferry Tour: 2
- Other: 1

Best results in major championships
- Masters Tournament: DNP
- PGA Championship: DNP
- U.S. Open: CUT: 2014
- The Open Championship: DNP

Henrik Anders Norlander (born 25 March 1987) is a Swedish professional golfer who plays on the PGA Tour.

== Early life ==
Norlander was born and grew up in Danderyd, outside Stockholm, Sweden, and is son of lawyer Anders Norlander. He played both tennis and golf in his youth, but finally preferred golf. His competitive career began at Fågelbro Golf & Country Club, but he later came to represent Djursholm Golf Club.

In 2002, Norlander finished second to David Lingmerth, who also came to be a PGA Tour player, at his age level category (15) at the unofficial Swedish Youth Championship, Bankboken Cup, at Falun-Borlänge Golf Club. The year after, he won the 16-years-old category.

== Amateur career ==
Norlander was part of the Swedish teams at the European Boys' Team Championship once and the European Amateur Team Championship three times. He also represented Sweden at the Eisenhower Trophy in 2008 in Adelaide, Australia, earning a bronze medal, and 2010 in Buenos Aires, Argentina.

He played college golf in the United States at Augusta State University in Augusta, Georgia. He helped lead his team to the 2010 NCAA Division I Championship. After graduating in June 2011, he turned professional.

Norlander's best ranking on the World Amateur Golf Ranking was 10th.

== Professional career ==
In 2011, shortly after he graduated from college, Norlander turned professional. He played on the Challenge Tour in 2011, making three cuts in eight events with a best finish of T-19 at the Norwegian Challenge.

By finishing T-22 at the 2012 PGA Tour Qualifying School, he earned his PGA Tour card for 2013. On the PGA Tour in 2013, Norlander made 13 cuts in 22 events with a best finish of T-15 at the Zurich Classic of New Orleans.

Norlander played the Web.com Tour in 2014 and 2015, winning his first professional tournament at the 2015 Hotel Fitness Championship. He finished third in the 2015 Web.com Finals (excluding regular season top 25), to earn a place on the 2016 PGA Tour, where his best finish was a tie for 25th at the Travelers Championship. He had a chance to keep his PGA Tour card at the Web.com Tour Finals, but when Hurricane Matthew got the Tour Championship cancelled, he was $788 short.

Norlander was competing on a sponsor's exemption when he found himself in a five-man playoff at the RSM Classic in November 2016. Darkness fell on Sunday after two playoff holes and when play resumed Monday morning he lost to rookie Mackenzie Hughes of Canada, who holed an 18-footer from off the green.

He won the 2019 Wichita Open on the Korn Ferry Tour, after a five-man playoff, and finished the season 11th on the 2019 tour standings, to qualify to the 2020 PGA Tour.

He finished tied 5th at the 2019 (2019–2020 season) RSM Classic, his second career top-five on the PGA Tour, both coming at this same event. After five made cuts in a row in June and July 2020, including a tied 6th place at the 2020 Memorial Tournament, Norlander advanced to 57th on the FedEx Cup ranking, for a sure spot in the 2020 FedEx Cup Playoffs. At the same time, he reached a career best 141st on the Official World Golf Ranking.

By finishing tied second at the Farmers Insurance Open at Torrey Pines, San Diego, California, 31 January 2021, Norlander matched his best finish on the PGA Tour. After finishing in the top-30 four weeks in a row on the 2021 PGA Tour, Norlander advanced to a career best 96th on the Official World Golf Ranking on 14 February 2021.

== Awards and honors ==
In 2021, he received Elit Sign number 145 by the Swedish Golf Federation based on world ranking achievements.

== Personal life ==
Norlander is married to Julie Anderson, a native of Augusta, Georgia, where the couple resides. Norlander is a member of Augusta Country Club.

== Amateur wins ==
- 2009 Chrysantemumbålen (Stockholm Golf Club, Sweden)
- 2010 Administaff ASU Invitational
- 2011 General Hackler Championship

== Professional wins (3) ==
=== Korn Ferry Tour wins (2) ===
Legend
Finals events (1)
Other Korn Ferry Tour (1)

No.	Date	Tournament	Winning score	Margin of victory	Runners-up
1	31 Aug 2015	Hotel Fitness Championship	−19 (69-69-69-62=269)	3 strokes	(South Korea) Lee Dong-hwan, (United States) Michael Thompson
2	24 Jun 2019	Wichita Open	−15 (63-68-68-66=265)	Playoff	(United States) Bryan Bigley, (Denmark) Sebastian Cappelen, (United States) Erik Compton, (United States) Kevin Dougherty

Korn Ferry Tour playoff record (1–0)

No.	Year	Tournament	Opponents	Result
1	2019	Wichita Open	(United States) Bryan Bigley, (Denmark) Sebastian Cappelen, (United States) Erik Compton, (United States) Kevin Dougherty	Won with par on third extra hole Cappelen, Compton and Dougherty eliminated by birdie on first hole

=== eGolf Professional Tour wins (1) ===
No.	Date	Tournament	Winning score	Margin of victory	Runner-up
1	28 Sep 2012	Olde Sycamore Open	−16 (69-65-66=200)	2 strokes	(United States) Gator Todd

== Playoff record ==
PGA Tour playoff record (0–2)

No.	Year	Tournament	Opponents	Result
1	2016	RSM Classic	(United States) Blayne Barber, (United States) Billy Horschel, (Canada) Mackenzie Hughes, (Colombia) Camilo Villegas	Hughes won with par on third extra hole Horschel eliminated by par on first hole
2	2023	Sanderson Farms Championship	(Sweden) Ludvig Åberg, (United States) Ben Griffin, (United States) Luke List, (United States) Scott Stallings	List won with birdie on first extra hole

== Results in major championships ==
Tournament	2014
Masters Tournament	
U.S. Open	CUT
The Open Championship	
PGA Championship	

Did not play

CUT = missed the halfway cut

== Results in The Players Championship ==
Tournament	2021	2022	2023	2024	2025
The Players Championship	CUT	CUT			CUT

Did not play

CUT = missed the halfway cut

== Team appearances ==
Amateur

- European Boys' Team Championship (representing Sweden): 2004
- European Amateur Team Championship (representing Sweden): 2008, 2009, 2010
- Eisenhower Trophy (representing Sweden): 2008, 2010
- Palmer Cup (representing Europe): 2009 (winners), 2010, 2011

== See also ==
- 2012 PGA Tour Qualifying School graduates
- 2015 Web.com Tour Finals graduates
- 2019 Korn Ferry Tour Finals graduates
- 2022 Korn Ferry Tour Finals graduates
