= 2012 Challenge Tour graduates =

This is a list of players who graduated from the Challenge Tour in 2012. The top 21 players on the Challenge Tour's money list in 2012 earned their European Tour card for 2013.

	2012 Challenge Tour		2013 European Tour				
Player	Money list rank	Earnings (€)	Starts	Cuts made	Best finish	Money list rank	Earnings (€)
(Norway) Espen Kofstad*	1	131,099	30	12	T8	135	155,440
(Sweden) Kristoffer Broberg*	2	126,508	27	9	2	103	258,105
(Denmark) Andreas Hartø	3	121,999	30	15	7	119	199,447
(Denmark) Joachim B. Hansen*	4	120,085	28	11	T3	79	375,037
(England) Gary Lockerbie	5	117,482	27	9	T15	141	131,615
(Sweden) Magnus A. Carlsson	6	110,487	26	15	T4	106	251,434
(England) Simon Wakefield	7	108,593	30	16	T8	134	155,490
(Italy) Alessandro Tadini	8	101,428	27	14	T20	148	113,905
(France) Alexandre Kaleka	9	95,944	29	12	T2	116	209,866
(Scotland) Chris Doak	10	92,730	27	16	T8	101	261,507
(Scotland) Scott Henry*	11	90,688	31	14	T4	120	197,601
(England) Chris Paisley*	12	74,485	31	14	T11	122	194,369
(England) Eddie Pepperell*	13	72,378	25	16	T6	76	389,766
(Germany) Maximilian Kieffer*	14	70,243	29	17	T2	73	416,910
(South Africa) Justin Walters*	15	69,913	31	16	2	64	512,158
(England) James Busby*	16	67,350	9	0	CUT	n/a	0
(France) Gary Stal*	17	66,580	11	6	T33	n/a	36,836
(Chile) Mark Tullo	18	66,436	25	14	T2	114	216,165
(Denmark) Morten Ørum Madsen*	19	65,338	23	15	T2	81	357,417
(England) Seve Benson	20	65,149	22	15	3	97	297,959
(England) Daniel Brooks*	21	64,776	15	4	T22	216	23,550

* European Tour rookie in 2013
T = Tied
The player retained his European Tour card for 2014 (finished inside the top 110).
The player did not retain his European Tour card for 2014, but retained conditional status (finished between 111 and 145).
The player did not retain his European Tour card for 2014 (finished outside the top 145).

Broberg earned a direct promotion to the European Tour after his third win of 2012 in August. Because Carlsson had also finished 93rd in the Race to Dubai, the graduating places were extended by one. The players ranked 17th through 21st were placed below the Qualifying School graduates on the exemption list, and thus could improve their status by competing in Qualifying School. Morten Ørum Madsen improved his status in this way. Hartø, Wakefield, Stal, and Brooks regained their cards for 2014 through Q School.

== Runners-up on the European Tour in 2013 ==
No.	Date	Player	Tournament	Winner	Winning score	Runner-up score
1	16 Dec 2012	(Sweden) Kristoffer Broberg	Alfred Dunhill Championship	(South Africa) Charl Schwartzel	−24 (67-64-64-69=264)	−12 (70-69-67-70=276)
2	21 Apr	(Germany) Maximilian Kieffer lost in three-man playoff	Open de España	(France) Raphaël Jacquelin	−5 (75-68-69-71=283)	−5 (73-66-73-71=283)
3–4	19 May	(Denmark) Morten Ørum Madsen	Madeira Islands Open	(United States) Peter Uihlein	−15 (72-64-69-68=273)	−13 (72-69-67-67=275)
3–4	19 May	(Chile) Mark Tullo	Madeira Islands Open	(United States) Peter Uihlein	−15 (72-64-69-68=273)	−13 (67-69-68-71=275)
5	28 Jul	(France) Alexandre Kaleka	M2M Russian Open	(Northern Ireland) Michael Hoey	−16 (70-67-65-70=272)	−12 (70-67-71-68=276)
6	13 Oct	(South Africa) Justin Walters	Portugal Masters	(England) David Lynn	−18 (65-65-73-63=266)	−17 (69-63-69-66=267)

== See also ==
- 2012 European Tour Qualifying School graduates
