= 2010 European Tour Qualifying School graduates =

This is a list of the 34 players who earned their 2011 European Tour card through Q School in 2010.

Place	Player	European Tour starts	Cuts made	Notes
1	(England) Simon Wakefield	250	124	1 Challenge Tour win, 1 Sunshine Tour win
2	(Spain) Carlos del Moral	46	27	2 Challenge Tour wins
3	(Finland) Mikko Korhonen	9	5	
4	(England) Adam Gee	11	4	
5	(South Africa) Jaco van Zyl	23	19	9 Sunshine Tour wins
T6	(Germany) Florian Fritsch	6	1	
T6	(Wales) Liam Bond	29	14	
T6	(Denmark) Andreas Hartø	0	0	2 Challenge Tour wins
T9	(France) Romain Wattel	2	1	1 Challenge Tour win
T9	(Wales) Stuart Manley	96	35	Played in 2003 Walker Cup
T11	(Scotland) Lloyd Saltman	14	3	Played in 2005 and 2007 Walker Cups; brother of Elliot Saltman
T11	(Netherlands) Tim Sluiter	4	2	
T11	(Sweden) Joakim Haeggman	426	266	3 European Tour wins; played in 1993 Ryder Cup
T11	(South Africa) Shaun Norris	16	5	1 Sunshine Tour win
T11	(France) Victor Dubuisson	10	3	Won 2009 European Amateur
T11	(United States) Jason Knutzon	54	28	2 Asian Tour wins
T11	(Denmark) Thomas Nørret	18	7	1 Challenge Tour win
T11	(England) Matthew Nixon	0	0	
T19	(South Africa) George Coetzee	30	15	3 Sunshine Tour wins
T19	(England) Steve Lewton	4	1	
T19	(Spain) Alfredo García-Heredia	38	15	
T22	(Sweden) Fredrik Ohlsson	21	5	
T22	(France) Alexandre Kaleka	5	4	1 Challenge Tour win; 20th in the Challenge Tour rankings
T22	(Spain) Pedro Oriol	8	2	
T22	(Australia) Wade Ormsby	131	67	
T26	(Spain) Manuel Quirós	44	21	
T26	(Spain) Sebi García	8	2	
T26	(Scotland) Elliot Saltman	1	0	Brother of Lloyd Saltman; received three-month ban in January 2011 for a rules breach at a 2010 Challenge Tour tournament
T26	(Norway) Eirik Tage Johansen	58	21	
T26	(France) François Delamontagne	192	92	
T26	(Austria) Markus Brier	298	164	2 European Tour wins, 2 Challenge Tour wins
T26	(Spain) Borja Etchart	4	0	
T26	(England) Steven Tiley	5	3	
T26	(Finland) Roope Kakko	31	15	1 Challenge Tour win

2011 European Tour rookie

== 2011 Results ==
Player	Starts	Cuts made	Best finish	Money list rank	Earnings (€)
(England) Simon Wakefield	24	13	2	122	226,795
(Spain) Carlos del Moral	27	18	T5	112	262,965
(Finland) Mikko Korhonen*	22	12	T16	166	113,821
(England) Adam Gee*	7	3	T41	n/a	17,960
(South Africa) Jaco van Zyl*	23	17	T2	50	611,280
(Germany) Florian Fritsch*	18	10	T8	156	138,424
(Wales) Liam Bond*	22	7	T14	191	60,671
(Denmark) Andreas Hartø*	20	6	T14	194	57,334
(France) Romain Wattel*	28	16	T5	90	337,476
(Wales) Stuart Manley	22	9	12	185	68,639
(Scotland) Lloyd Saltman*	25	18	T4	133	195,965
(Netherlands) Tim Sluiter*	21	11	T16	176	88,689
(Sweden) Joakim Haeggman	22	5	T20	219	32,975
(South Africa) Shaun Norris*	19	4	T8	220	31,479
(France) Victor Dubuisson*	20	15	T5	106	285,401
(United States) Jason Knutzon*	21	11	T17	147	152,931
(Denmark) Thomas Nørret*	22	13	4	155	138,438
(England) Matthew Nixon*	24	6	T11	183	75,314
(South Africa) George Coetzee	28	20	T2	26	913,128
(England) Steve Lewton*	21	8	T27	209	42,617
(Spain) Alfredo García-Heredia	17	8	T23	184	70,280
(Sweden) Fredrik Ohlsson	14	2	T26	261	12,600
(France) Alexandre Kaleka*	26	10	T5	159	128,735
(Spain) Pedro Oriol*	17	4	T16	229	28,070
(Australia) Wade Ormsby	21	10	T20	182	77,020
(Spain) Manuel Quirós	21	5	T2	164	116,177
(Spain) Sebi García*	13	6	T10	211	41,551
(Scotland) Elliot Saltman*	17	4	T12	198	55,776
(Norway) Eirik Tage Johansen	17	6	T8	212	41,110
(France) François Delamontagne	6	5	T20	n/a	38,480
(Austria) Markus Brier	25	11	T3	116	258,513
(Spain) Borja Etchart*	10	4	24	242	20,310
(England) Steven Tiley*	9	4	T9	n/a	36,232
(Finland) Roope Kakko*	6	3	T16	n/a	16,512

* European Tour rookie in 2011
T = Tied
The player retained his European Tour card for 2012 (finished inside the top 118).
The player did not retain his European Tour Tour card for 2012, but retained conditional status (finished between 119-150).
The player did not retain his European Tour card for 2012 (finished outside the top 150).

Sluiter, Nørret, and Nixon regained their cards for 2012 through Q School.

== Runners-up on the European Tour in 2011 ==
No.	Date	Player	Tournament	Winner	Winning score	Runner-up score
1	9 Jan	(Spain) Manuel Quirós lost in three-man playoff	Africa Open	(South Africa) Louis Oosthuizen	−16 (70-67-69-70=276)	−16 (71-68-68-69=276)
2	3 Apr	(South Africa) Jaco van Zyl lost in three-man playoff	Trophée Hassan II	(England) David Horsey	−13 (67-71-67-69=274)	−13 (68-73-65-68=274)
3	28 Aug	(South Africa) George Coetzee lost in five-man playoff	Johnnie Walker Championship at Gleneagles	(Denmark) Thomas Bjørn	−11 (68-69-71-69=277)	−11 (77-66-67-67=277)
4	25 Sep	(England) Simon Wakefield lost in playoff	Austrian Golf Open	(England) Kenneth Ferrie	−12 (72-70-67-67=276)	−12 (73-66-70-67=276)

== See also ==
- 2010 Challenge Tour graduates
- 2011 European Tour
