= Gary Stal =

French professional golfer (born 1992)

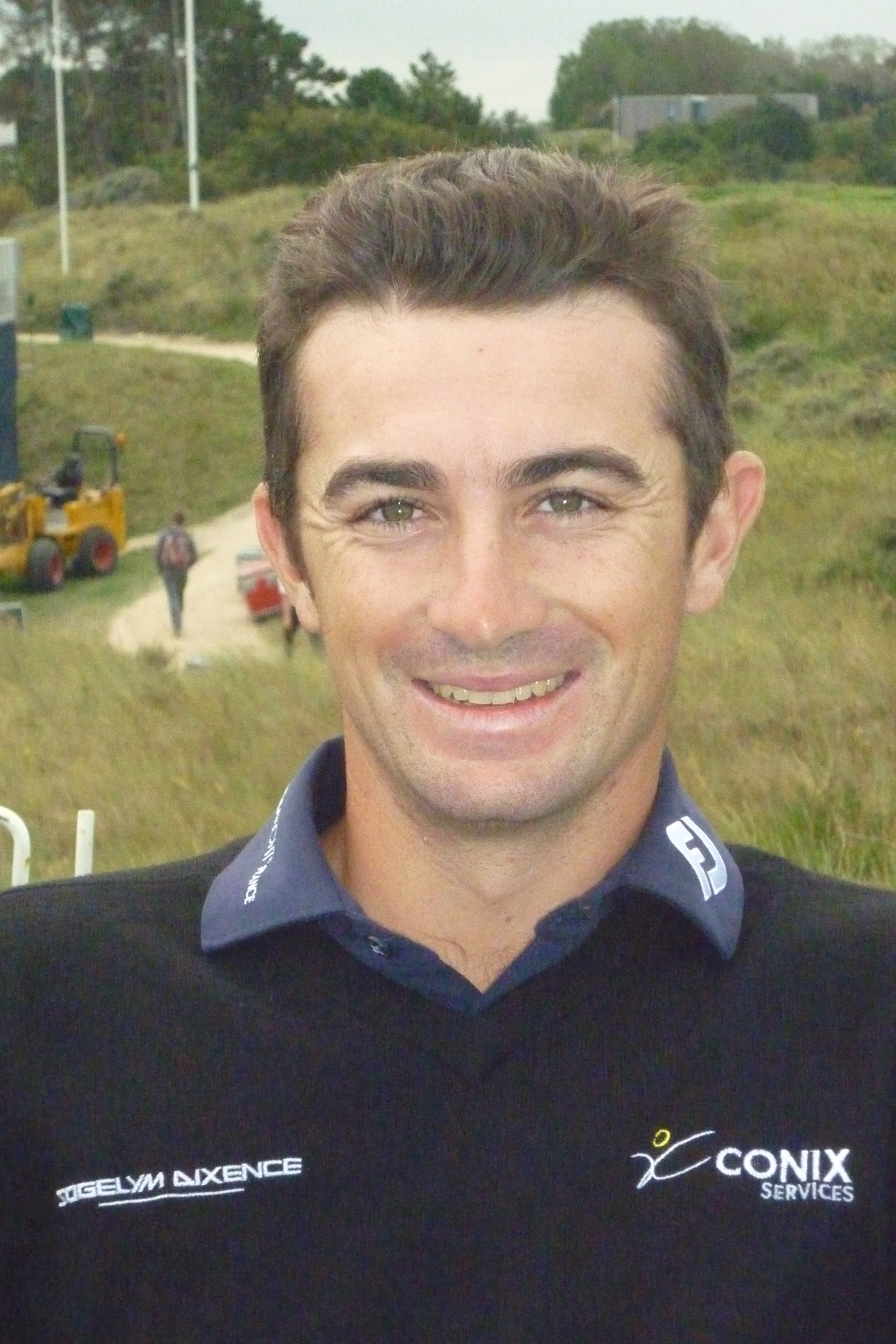
- Stal in September 2014

Personal information
- Nationality: France
- Born: 9 February 1992 (age 34) Décines, France
- Height: 1.76 m (5 ft 9 in)
- Weight: 69 kg (152 lb; 10.9 st)

Career
- Sport: Golf
- Turned professional: 2012
- Current tour: European Tour
- Former tour: Challenge Tour
- Professional wins: 5
- Highest ranking: 89 (1 February 2015)

Number of wins by tour
- European Tour: 1
- Challenge Tour: 2
- Other: 2

Best results in major championships
- Masters Tournament: DNP
- PGA Championship: DNP
- U.S. Open: CUT: 2016
- The Open Championship: DNP

Gary Stal (born 9 February 1992) is a French professional golfer.

== Career ==
Stal was born in Décines, near Lyon. He played on the Challenge Tour in 2012. He won his first title in June 2012 at the Kärnten Golf Open, playing on an invitation. The following month, Stal picked up another victory at the Credit Suisse Challenge, defeating Alexandre Kaleka in a playoff and graduated to the European Tour. He was less successful in 2013, but performed well at the second and final stages of Qualifying School to regain his place on Tour. He then finished 89th on the 2014 Order of Merit, making 21 cuts in 25 tournaments.

On 18 January 2015, Stal secured his first victory on a major tour, shooting a −7 in the final round to win the European Tour's Abu Dhabi HSBC Golf Championship by one stroke over Rory McIlroy.

== Professional wins (5) ==
=== European Tour wins (1) ===
No.	Date	Tournament	Winning score	Margin of victory	Runner-up
1	18 Jan 2015	Abu Dhabi HSBC Golf Championship	−19 (68-69-67-65=269)	1 stroke	(Northern Ireland) Rory McIlroy

=== Challenge Tour wins (2) ===
No.	Date	Tournament	Winning score	Margin of victory	Runner-up
1	10 Jun 2012	Kärnten Golf Open	−20 (65-67-68-68=268)	1 stroke	(England) Daniel Brooks
2	15 Jul 2012	Credit Suisse Challenge	−11 (69-67-67-70=273)	Playoff	(France) Alexandre Kaleka

Challenge Tour playoff record (1–0)

No.	Year	Tournament	Opponent	Result
1	2012	Credit Suisse Challenge	(France) Alexandre Kaleka	Won with birdie on first extra hole

=== French Tour wins (2) ===
No.	Date	Tournament	Winning score	Margin of victory	Runner(s)-up
1	2 Mar 2012	Cartes d'Acces	−3 (69-72-72=213)	3 strokes	(Spain) Juan Antonio Bragulat, (France) Alberto Campanile
2	24 Mar 2012	Internationaux de France	−11 (65-69-68=202)	Playoff	(France) Jérôme Lando-Casanova

== Results in major championships ==
Tournament	2016
Masters Tournament	
U.S. Open	CUT
The Open Championship	
PGA Championship	

Did not play

CUT = missed the halfway cut

== Results in World Golf Championships ==
Tournament	2015
Championship	70
Match Play	
Invitational	T63
Champions	

Did not play

"T" = Tied

== Team appearances ==
Amateur

- European Boys' Team Championship (representing France): 2009, 2010
- European Amateur Team Championship (representing France): 2011 (winners)

== See also ==
- 2012 Challenge Tour graduates
- 2013 European Tour Qualifying School graduates
- 2022 European Tour Qualifying School graduates
