= Allianz Open de Lyon =

Tournament information
- Location: Monthieux, France
- Established: 2008
- Course: Golf du Gouverneur
- Par: 71
- Length: 7,061 yards (6,457 m)
- Tour: Challenge Tour
- Format: Stroke play
- Prize fund: €160,000
- Month played: October
- Final year: 2012

Tournament record score
- Aggregate: 266 David Horsey (2008)
- To par: −22 as above

Final champion
- (Scotland) Chris Doak
- Location in France Location in Auvergne-Rhône-Alpes

The Allianz Open de Lyon was a golf tournament on the Challenge Tour, played near Lyon, France. It was held annually from 2008 to 2012, and was always held at Golf du Gouverneur in Monthieux.

== Winners ==
Year	Winner	Score	To par	Margin of victory	Runner-up
Allianz Open de Lyon
2012	(Scotland) Chris Doak	271	−13	Playoff	(Netherlands) Tim Sluiter
Allianz Golf Open de Lyon
2011	(France) Julien Quesne	268	−16	2 strokes	(Belgium) Pierre Relecom
2010	(Austria) Bernd Wiesberger	267	−17	2 strokes	(Sweden) Joel Sjöholm
Allianz EurOpen de Lyon
2009	(France) Alexandre Kaleka	268	−16	1 stroke	(Denmark) Anders Schmidt Hansen
AGF-Allianz EurOpen de Lyon
2008	(England) David Horsey	266	−22	1 stroke	(England) Marcus Higley

== See also ==
- Open V33 Grand Lyon
