= Scott Henry (golfer) =

Scottish golfer

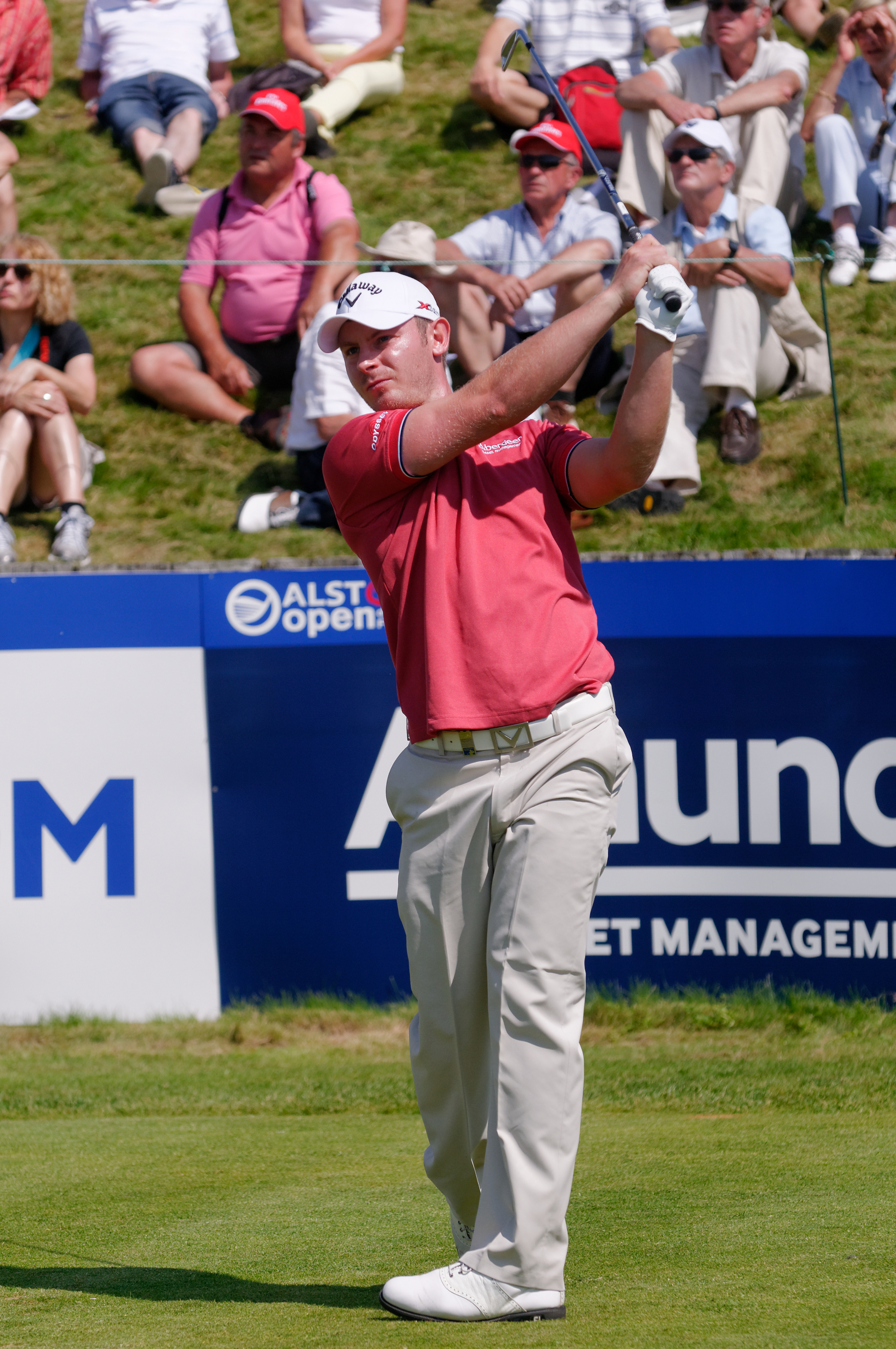
- Henry at the 2013 Open de France

Personal information
- Nationality: Scotland
- Born: 20 January 1987 (age 39) Glasgow, Scotland
- Height: 1.83 m (6 ft 0 in)
- Weight: 85 kg (187 lb; 13.4 st)
- Spouse: Kylie Walker (m. 2016)

Career
- Sport: Golf
- Turned professional: 2007
- Current tour: Challenge Tour
- Former tour: European Tour
- Professional wins: 3

Number of wins by tour
- Challenge Tour: 1
- Other: 2

Scott Henry (born 20 January 1987) is a Scottish professional golfer. He won the 2012 Kazakhstan Open on the Challenge Tour.

== Amateur career ==
Henry had a successful junior career winning a number of Scottish boys titles and playing in the Jacques Léglise Trophy in 2004 and 2005, captaining the Great Britain & Ireland team on the latter occasion. He won the Scottish Stroke Play Championship in 2006.

== Professional career ==
In 2007, Henry turned professional. He played on the Challenge Tour in 2009 with little success. Henry returned to the tour in 2012, winning his first title at the Kazakhstan Open. He finished 11th in the Order of Merit to gain a place on the European Tour for 2013. His best finish in 2013 was joint fourth in the Johnnie Walker Championship at Gleneagles and from 2014 to 2016 he played mainly on the Challenge Tour. In 2014, he lost in a playoff for the Madeira Islands Open, a joint European Tour/Challenge Tour event and came second again in the same event in 2015. In 2016 he was joint runner-up in the Vierumäki Finnish Challenge. At the end of 2016 he finished joint second in the European Tour Q-school to gain a place on the main tour for 2017. 2017 was a disappointing season and he returned to the Challenge Tour for 2018.

Henry missed out on his second Challenge Tour win after finishing 6-5-6 at the 2018 Galgorm Resort & Spa Northern Ireland Open. He had led by three strokes after 15 holes and finished tied for second place, a stroke behind Calum Hill.

== Personal life ==
Henry is married to Ladies European Tour golfer Kylie Walker. They competed against each other in the Jordan Mixed Open.

== Amateur wins ==
- 2004 Scottish Boys Championship, Scottish Boys Stroke Play Championship
- 2005 Scottish Boys Championship
- 2006 Scottish Stroke Play Championship

== Professional wins (3) ==
=== Challenge Tour wins (1) ===
No.	Date	Tournament	Winning score	Margin of victory	Runner-up
1	16 Sep 2012	Kazakhstan Open	−19 (66-67-67-69=269)	Playoff	(Austria) HP Bacher

Challenge Tour playoff record (1–1)

No.	Year	Tournament	Opponent	Result
1	2012	Kazakhstan Open	(Austria) HP Bacher	Won with par on second extra hole
2	2014	Madeira Islands Open - Portugal - BPI	(England) Daniel Brooks	Lost to par on first extra hole

=== Tartan Pro Tour wins (1) ===
No.	Date	Tournament	Winning score	Margin of victory	Runner-up
1	8 Jun 2025	Paul Lawrie Golf Centre Scottish Par 3 Championship	−7 (52-52-51=155)	Playoff	(Scotland) Chris Maclean

=== Alps Tour wins (1) ===
No.	Date	Tournament	Winning score	Margin of victory	Runner-up
1	22 May 2011	Gösser Open	−17 (67-69-63=199)	1 stroke	(Austria) Roland Steiner

== Playoff record ==
European Tour playoff record (0–1)

No.	Year	Tournament	Opponent	Result
1	2014	Madeira Islands Open - Portugal - BPI	(England) Daniel Brooks	Lost to par on first extra hole

== Team appearances ==
Amateur

- Jacques Léglise Trophy (representing Great Britain & Ireland): 2004 (winners), 2005 (captain)

== See also ==
- 2012 Challenge Tour graduates
- 2016 European Tour Qualifying School graduates
