= Alexandre Kaleka =

French professional golfer (born 1987)

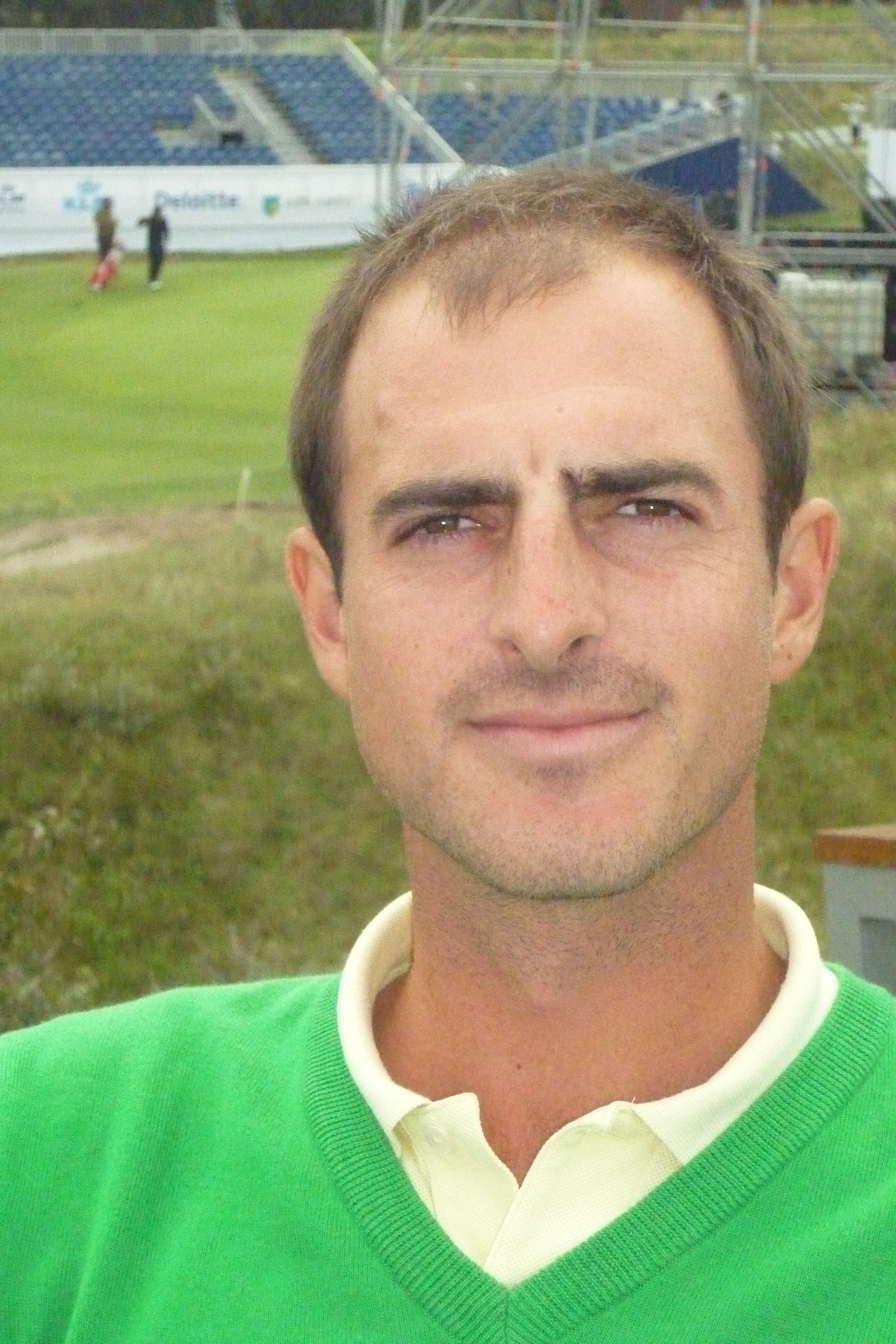

Personal information
- Nationality: France
- Born: 6 March 1987 (age 39) Paris, France
- Height: 1.83 m (6 ft 0 in)
- Weight: 75 kg (165 lb; 11.8 st)

Career
- Sport: Golf
- Turned professional: 2009
- Current tour: Challenge Tour
- Former tours: European Tour; Pro Golf Tour
- Professional wins: 3

Number of wins by tour
- Challenge Tour: 2
- Other: 1

Alexandre Kaleka (born 6 March 1987) is a French professional golfer.

== Career ==
Kaleka turned professional in July 2009 and won his first tournament as a professional, the Allianz EurOpen de Lyon on the Challenge Tour. The win gave him a full exemption on the Challenge Tour in 2010, where a consistent season saw him finish in 20th place on the Order of Merit, giving him the final available European Tour card for 2011. He further improved his status at the end-of-year qualifying school. He struggled in his rookie year on the European Tour, making only 10 of 27 cuts while finishing 159th on the Order of Merit. His best result came at the Irish Open where he finished in fifth. Kaleka returned to the Challenge Tour in 2012. In September, he won the M2M Russian Challenge Cup.

== Professional wins (3) ==
=== Challenge Tour wins (2) ===
| No. | Date | Tournament | Winning score | Margin of victory | Runner(s)-up |
|---|---|---|---|---|---|
| 1 | 12 Jul 2009 | Allianz EurOpen de Lyon | −16 (63-67-70-68=268) | 1 stroke | (Denmark) Anders Schmidt Hansen |
| 2 | 9 Sep 2012 | M2M Russian Challenge Cup | −7 (69-71-71-70=281) | 1 stroke | (Italy) Alessandro Tadini, (Chile) Mark Tullo |

Challenge Tour playoff record (0–1)

| No. | Year | Tournament | Opponent | Result |
|---|---|---|---|---|
| 1 | 2012 | Credit Suisse Challenge | (France) Gary Stal | Lost to birdie on first extra hole |

=== Pro Golf Tour wins (1) ===
| No. | Date | Tournament | Winning score | Margin of victory | Runner-up |
|---|---|---|---|---|---|
| 1 | 6 Feb 2015 | Open Al Maaden | −22 (62-65-67=194) | 8 strokes | (Germany) Marcel Schneider |

== Team appearances ==
Amateur

- European Boys' Team Championship (representing France): 2004, 2005
- European Youths' Team Championship (representing France): 2006
- European Amateur Team Championship (representing France): 2007, 2008, 2009
- Eisenhower Trophy (representing France): 2008
- St Andrews Trophy (representing the Continent of Europe): 2008
- Bonallack Trophy (representing Europe): 2008 (winners)

== See also ==
- 2010 Challenge Tour graduates
- 2010 European Tour Qualifying School graduates
- 2012 Challenge Tour graduates
