= Chris Doak =

Scottish golfer (born 1977)

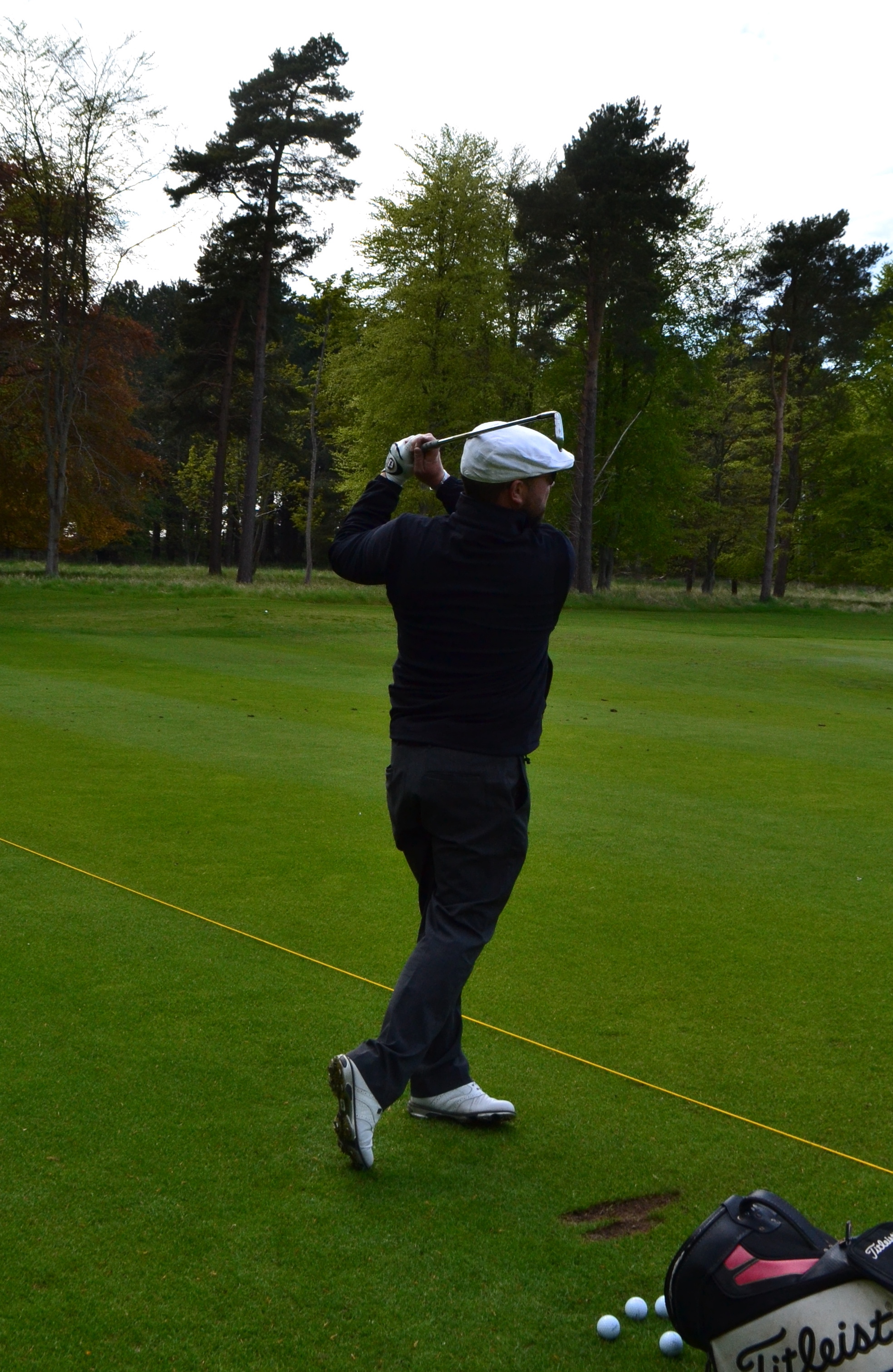
- Doak hitting on the range at his home club, The Renaissance Club in North Berwick

Personal information
- Nickname: Doaky
- Nationality: Scotland
- Born: 19 December 1977 (age 48) Glasgow, Scotland
- Height: 6 ft 0 in (1.83 m)
- Weight: 178 lb (81 kg; 12.7 st)
- Spouse: Laura Doak
- Children: Eva

Career
- Sport: Golf
- Turned professional: 1997
- Current tour: Challenge Tour
- Former tour: European Tour
- Professional wins: 5

Number of wins by tour
- Challenge Tour: 1
- Other: 4

Best results in major championships
- Masters Tournament: DNP
- PGA Championship: DNP
- U.S. Open: CUT: 2013, 2014
- The Open Championship: DNP

Chris Doak (born 19 December 1977) is a Scottish professional golfer on the European Tour.

== Professional career ==
In 1997, "Doaky" turned professional. He played on the Scottish PGA Tartan Tour, twice topping the regional Order of Merit and clocking up over forty wins, including the Northern Open in both 2005 and 2008. In 2008, Doak won the Srixon PGA Play-offs to become the British and Irish PGA No.1 and set a new record for the most Tartan Tour order of merit wins in one season. In 2010, Chris returned to the Tartan Tour circuit to win the Scottish PGA Championship at Gleneagles.

Doak first played on the European Tour in 2009. He played on the Challenge Tour from 2010 to 2012, winning at the 2012 Allianz Open de Lyon.

Doak played as part of Team Scottish Hydro, before gaining his European Tour card after finishing top ten in the Challenge Tour Order of Merit.

On 27 May 2013, Doak survived a five-way playoff at Walton Heath to qualify for the 2013 U.S. Open.

After several years on the PGA European Tour, Doak took time away from competitive golf following an ulnar nerve injury that prevented him from gripping his club properly. He recently announced his return to golf, both playing tournaments and coaching.

== Professional wins (5) ==
=== Challenge Tour wins (1) ===
No.	Date	Tournament	Winning score	Margin of victory	Runner-up
1	7 Oct 2012	Allianz Open de Lyon	−13 (70-67-68-68=271)	Playoff	(Netherlands) Tim Sluiter

Challenge Tour playoff record (1–0)

No.	Year	Tournament	Opponent	Result
1	2012	Allianz Open de Lyon	(Netherlands) Tim Sluiter	Won with par on third extra hole

=== Other wins (4) ===
- 2005 Northern Open
- 2008 Srixon PGA Play-offs, Northern Open
- 2010 Scottish PGA Championship

== See also ==
- 2008 European Tour Qualifying School graduates
- 2012 Challenge Tour graduates
