= 2009 PGA EuroPro Tour =

Golf tour season

2009 PGA EuroPro Tour season
- Duration: 6 May 2009 – 29 October 2009
- Number of official events: 13
- Most wins: (England) Tom Haylock (2) (Scotland) Scott Jamieson (2)
- Order of Merit: (Scotland) Scott Jamieson

The 2009 PGA EuroPro Tour was the eighth season of the PGA EuroPro Tour, a third-tier tour recognised by the European Tour.

== Schedule ==
The following table lists official events during the 2009 season.

| Date | Tournament | Location | Purse (£) | Winner (Note: The number in brackets after each winner's name is the number of PGA EuroPro Tour events they had won up to and including that tournament. It is rare for someone to accumulate many wins on the PGA EuroPro Tour as success at this level usually leads to promotion to the Challenge Tour.) |
|---|---|---|---|---|
| 8 May | Michael Ward UK Open | Northamptonshire | 40,110 | (England) Steve Surry (1) |
| 15 May | Green 17 Faithlegg Championship | Ireland | 40,445 | (Scotland) Jack Doherty (1) |
| 11 Jun | Partypoker.com European Championship | Kent | 39,380 | (Scotland) Scott Jamieson (1) |
| 18 Jun | Sureshot GPS International Open | Devon | 40,605 | (England) Daniel Brooks (1) |
| 2 Jul | Stoke by Nayland | Suffolk | 40,445 | (England) Tom Haylock (1) |
| 16 Jul | Motocaddy Masters | Bristol | 39,755 | (England) Paul Maddy (1) |
| 1 Aug | Pandora Open | Surrey | 40,110 | (England) James Busby (1) |
| 6 Aug | Virgin Atlantic Anniversary Classic | Kent | 39,935 | (England) Graeme Clark (4) |
| 13 Aug | ABC Solutions UK Championship | Cheshire | 39,570 | (Scotland) Scott Jamieson (2) |
| 21 Aug | Formby Hall | Merseyside | 39,185 | (England) Tom Haylock (2) |
| 28 Aug | Brooks Bros Classic | Essex | 40,110 | (England) Sean Whiffin (1) |
| 9 Oct | Partypoker.com International Open | Fife | 39,185 | (England) Sandeep Grewal (1) |
| 29 Oct | Tour Championship | Northumberland | 49,200 | (England) Simon Lilly (4) |

=== Unofficial events ===
The following events were sanctioned by the PGA EuroPro Tour, but did not carry official money, nor were wins official.

| Date | Tournament | Location | Purse (£) | Winner |
|---|---|---|---|---|
| 10 Dec | Samanah Masters | Morocco | €70,000 | (England) Daniel Brooks |

== Order of Merit ==
The Order of Merit was based on prize money won during the season, calculated in Pound sterling. The top five players on the Order of Merit (not otherwise exempt) earned status to play on the 2010 Challenge Tour.

| Position | Player | Prize money (£) | Status earned |
|---|---|---|---|
| 1 | (Scotland) Scott Jamieson | 23,492 | Qualified for Challenge Tour (made cut in Q School) |
| 2 | (England) Tom Haylock | 22,978 | Promoted to Challenge Tour |
| 3 | (England) Daniel Brooks | 22,270 | Promoted to Challenge Tour |
| 4 | (England) Steve Surry | 20,923 | Qualified for Challenge Tour (made cut in Q School) |
| 5 | (England) Simon Lilly | 20,407 | Promoted to Challenge Tour |
| 6 | (Scotland) Jack Doherty | 17,219 | Promoted to Challenge Tour |
| 7 | (England) Paul Dwyer | 16,455 | Promoted to Challenge Tour |
| 8 | (England) James Busby | 15,935 | |
| 9 | (Scotland) Elliot Saltman | 14,384 | |
| 10 | (England) Paul Maddy | 14,374 | |
