= Jacques Léglise Trophy =

International junior golf competition

The Jacques Léglise Trophy is an annual amateur boys' team golf competition between Great Britain & Ireland and the Continent of Europe. It was first played in 1977, as a one-day match before the Boys Amateur Championship, but since 1996 it has been played as a separate two-day match. The venue generally alternates between Great Britain and Ireland and the continent. From 1958 to 1966 a similar match was played between a combined England and Scotland team and the Continent of Europe.

== History ==
The event can trace its origins back to 1958. An England–Scotland boys match had been played since 1923 before the Boys Amateur Championship. In 1958 the match was played on the Friday and a match between a combined England and Scotland team and Europe was played on the Saturday. The English and Scottish selectors each chose four players to make up the British team. The match, consisting of four foursomes and eight singles matches, was very one-sided with the European team losing 11 of the 12 matches and halving the other. The 1959 match had only three foursomes matches and six singles. The Europeans won one of the foursomes and halved two of the singles. The 1960 match had five foursomes matches and ten singles. The match was close with the continental team winning two of the foursomes matches and five of the singles. In 1961, the continental team lost all five foursomes matches but won four of the singles matches. In 1962, the score was the same with the continent winning one foursomes match and three singles, while in 1963 they won two foursomes matches and one singles. The 1964 and 1965 contests had four foursomes matches and nine singles. The Continental team won just one singles match on each occasion The 1966 match wes reduced to four foursomes and eight singles, the continental team winning just two singles matches. The combined England and Scotland team had dominated to such an extent that it was discontinued after 1966, and replaced by an annual youth international, played before the British Youths Open Amateur Championship and which was held for the first time in 1967.

The boys match was revived in 1977 when Jean-Louis Dupont donated a trophy in memory of Jacques Léglise, who had been president of the French Golf Federation and of the European Golf Association. There were four foursomes and nine singles matches and the Continental team won for the first time. In 1978 the Continental team won again by the same score, 7–6. From 1979 the number of singles match was reduced to eight. In 1993 the match was extended, with five foursomes and ten singles matches Up to 1995 it was played over a single day in connection with the Boys Amateur Championship.

Since 1996 it has been played as a separate two-day match with the venue generally alternating between Great Britain and Ireland and the continent. There were 10 players in each team in 1996 reduced to 9 since 1997. From 1996 to 2014 both days had four foursomes in the morning and eight singles matches in the afternoon. From 2015, there have been nine singles matches on the final afternoon.

== Format ==
Currently the teams are nine strong and the tournament is played over two days, with four foursomes in the morning and either eight or nine singles matches in the afternoon. The Great Britain and Ireland team is selected by The R&A and the Continent of Europe side by the European Golf Association. Players must be under 18 on 1 January of the year in which the event takes place.

In some years the Great Britain and Ireland team chose a captain from among the players; in addition to a non-playing manager. The Continent of Europe side has a non-playing captain.

== Results ==
Since the event was revived in 1977, the Great Britain & Ireland team has won the event 29 times, while Continent of Europe has 17 victories. The 2015 match ended in a tie and so Great Britain & Ireland retained the trophy. In 2024 the first day foursomes were not played because of bad weather. Nine singles were played in the afternoon.

Year	Venue	Winning team Captain	Score		Losing team Captain	Ref.
2026	The Island Golf Club, Ireland	Continent of Europe; Pierre Relecom (Belgium)	14½	10½	Great Britain (United Kingdom) & Ireland (Republic of Ireland); Niall Macsweeney (Republic of Ireland)	
2025	Royal Golf Club of Belgium, Belgium	Continent of Europe; Pierre Relecom (Belgium)	15	10	Great Britain (United Kingdom) & Ireland (Republic of Ireland); Chris King (Wales)	
2024	West Lancashire Golf Club, England	Continent of Europe; Pierre Relecom (Belgium)	12	10	Great Britain (United Kingdom) & Ireland (Republic of Ireland); Chris King (Wales)	
2023	Golf de Chantilly, France	Continent of Europe; Joachim Fourquet (France)	17	8	Great Britain (United Kingdom) & Ireland (Republic of Ireland); Dylan Shaw-Radford (England)	
2022	Blairgowrie Golf Club, Scotland	Continent of Europe; Joachim Fourquet (France)	13 1/2	11 1/2	Great Britain (United Kingdom) & Ireland (Republic of Ireland); Niall Shiels Donegan (Scotland)	
2021	Falsterbo Golf Club, Sweden	Continent of Europe; Joachim Fourquet (France)	16 1/2	8 1/2	Great Britain (United Kingdom) & Ireland (Republic of Ireland); Cameron Adam (Scotland)	
2020	Blairgowrie Golf Club, Scotland	Cancelled due to the Covid-19 pandemic				
2019	Aldeburgh Golf Club, England	Continent of Europe; Joachim Fourquet (France)	15 1/2	9 1/2	Great Britain (United Kingdom) & Ireland (Republic of Ireland); Barclay Brown (England)	
2018	Kytäjä Golf, Finland	Great Britain (United Kingdom) & Ireland (Republic of Ireland); Barclay Brown (England)	15 1/2	9 1/2	Continent of Europe; Jeroen Stevens (Netherlands)	
2017	Ballybunion Golf Club, Ireland	Continent of Europe; Jeroen Stevens (Netherlands)	15 1/2	9 1/2	Great Britain (United Kingdom) & Ireland (Republic of Ireland); Mark Power (Republic of Ireland)	
2016	Prince's Golf Club, Sandwich, England	Continent of Europe; Jeroen Stevens (Netherlands)	13 1/2	11 1/2	Great Britain (United Kingdom) & Ireland (Republic of Ireland); Marco Penge (England)	
2015	Royal Dornoch Golf Club, Scotland	Great Britain (United Kingdom) & Ireland (Republic of Ireland); Bradley Moore (England)	12 1/2	12 1/2	Continent of Europe; Miguel Franco de Sousa (Portugal)	
2014	Barsebäck Golf & Country Club, Sweden	Great Britain (United Kingdom) & Ireland (Republic of Ireland); Ewen Ferguson (Scotland)	12 1/2	11 1/2	Continent of Europe; Miguel Franco de Sousa (Portugal)	
2013	Royal St. David's, Wales	Great Britain (United Kingdom) & Ireland (Republic of Ireland); Ashton Turner (England)	15	9	Continent of Europe; Miguel Franco de Sousa (Portugal)	
2012	Portmarnock Golf Club, Ireland	Continent of Europe; Gerald Stangl (Austria)	13 1/2	10 1/2	Great Britain (United Kingdom) & Ireland (Republic of Ireland); Gavin Moynihan (Republic of Ireland)	
2011	Neguri Golf Club, Spain	Great Britain (United Kingdom) & Ireland (Republic of Ireland); David Boote (Wales)	14 1/2	9 1/2	Continent of Europe; Gerald Stangl (Austria)	
2010	Castelconturbia Golf Club, Italy	Continent of Europe; Gerald Stangl (Austria)	15 1/2	8 1/2	Great Britain (United Kingdom) & Ireland (Republic of Ireland); Rhys Pugh (Wales)	
2009	Ganton Golf Club, England	Great Britain (United Kingdom) & Ireland (Republic of Ireland); Paul Dunne (Republic of Ireland)	14 1/2	9 1/2	Continent of Europe; Andreas Pallauf (Austria)	
2008	Kingsbarns Golf Links, Scotland	Great Britain (United Kingdom) & Ireland (Republic of Ireland); Michael Stewart (Scotland)	14	10	Continent of Europe; Andreas Pallauf (Austria)	
2007	Notts Golf Club, England	Great Britain (United Kingdom) & Ireland (Republic of Ireland); Jack Hiluta (England)	13 1/2	10 1/2	Continent of Europe; Andreas Pallauf (Austria)	
2006	Royal Golf Club Mariánské Lázne, Czech Republic	Continent of Europe; Andreas Pallauf (Austria)	19 1/2	4 1/2	Great Britain (United Kingdom) & Ireland (Republic of Ireland); Niall Kearney (Republic of Ireland)	
2005	Royal Porthcawl Golf Club, Wales	Continent of Europe; Andreas Pallauf (Austria)	14	10	Great Britain (United Kingdom) & Ireland (Republic of Ireland); Scott Henry (Scotland)	
2004	Nairn Golf Club, Scotland	Great Britain (United Kingdom) & Ireland (Republic of Ireland); Cian McNamara (Republic of Ireland)	14 1/2	9 1/2	Continent of Europe; Nicolas Sulzer (Switzerland)	
2003	Lahinch Golf Club, Ireland	Great Britain (United Kingdom) & Ireland (Republic of Ireland); Paul Waring (England)	16 1/2	7 1/2	Continent of Europe	
2002	Golf Club de Lausanne, Switzerland	Great Britain (United Kingdom) & Ireland (Republic of Ireland); Rhys Davies (Wales)	14	10	Continent of Europe; Gonzalo Fernández-Castaño (Spain)	
2001	Golf de Chantilly, France	Continent of Europe; Charlie Westrup (Norway)	16	8	Great Britain (United Kingdom) & Ireland (Republic of Ireland)	
2000	Turnberry, Scotland	Great Britain (United Kingdom) & Ireland (Republic of Ireland); Zane Scotland (England)	16	8	Continent of Europe; Charlie Westrup (Norway)	
1999	Burnham & Berrow Golf Club, England	Great Britain (United Kingdom) & Ireland (Republic of Ireland); Nick Dougherty (England)	15	9	Continent of Europe; Charlie Westrup (Norway)	
1998	Circolo Golf Villa d'Este, Italy	Great Britain (United Kingdom) & Ireland (Republic of Ireland); David Jones (Republic of Ireland)	14	10	Continent of Europe; Charlie Westrup (Norway)	
1997	Royal Aberdeen Golf Club, Scotland	Continent of Europe; Charlie Westrup (Norway)	12 1/2	11 1/2	Great Britain (United Kingdom) & Ireland (Republic of Ireland); Phil Rowe (England)	
1996	Woodhall Spa Golf Club, England	Continent of Europe; Charlie Westrup (Norway)	13	11	Great Britain (United Kingdom) & Ireland (Republic of Ireland); Martin Brown (Scotland)	
1995	Dunbar Golf Club, Scotland	Great Britain (United Kingdom) & Ireland (Republic of Ireland); Grant Campbell (Scotland)	9	6	Continent of Europe; Charlie Westrup (Norway)	
1994	Little Aston Golf Club, England	Great Britain (United Kingdom) & Ireland (Republic of Ireland)	12 1/2	2 1/2	Continent of Europe	
1993	Glenbervie Golf Club, Scotland	Great Britain (United Kingdom) & Ireland (Republic of Ireland); Sean Quinlinvan (Republic of Ireland)	8	7	Continent of Europe; Björn Nordberg (Sweden)	
1992	Royal Mid-Surrey Golf Club, England	Great Britain (United Kingdom) & Ireland (Republic of Ireland)	8	7	Continent of Europe	
1991	Montrose Golf Club, Scotland	Great Britain (United Kingdom) & Ireland (Republic of Ireland)	6 1/2	5 1/2	Continent of Europe	
1990	Hunstanton Golf Club, England	Great Britain (United Kingdom) & Ireland (Republic of Ireland)	10	2	Continent of Europe	
1989	Nairn Golf Club, Scotland	Great Britain (United Kingdom) & Ireland (Republic of Ireland)	7 1/2	4 1/2	Continent of Europe	
1988	Formby Golf Club, England	Great Britain (United Kingdom) & Ireland (Republic of Ireland)	9 1/2	2 1/2	Continent of Europe	
1987	Kilmarnock (Barassie) Golf Club, Scotland	Great Britain (United Kingdom) & Ireland (Republic of Ireland)	7 1/2	4 1/2	Continent of Europe	
1986	Seaton Carew Golf Club, England	Continent of Europe	8 1/2	3 1/2	Great Britain (United Kingdom) & Ireland (Republic of Ireland)	
1985	Royal Burgess, Scotland	Great Britain (United Kingdom) & Ireland (Republic of Ireland)	7 1/2	4 1/2	Continent of Europe	
1984	Royal Porthcawl Golf Club, Wales	Great Britain (United Kingdom) & Ireland (Republic of Ireland)	6 1/2	5 1/2	Continent of Europe	
1983	Glenbervie Golf Club, Scotland	Great Britain (United Kingdom) & Ireland (Republic of Ireland)	6 1/2	5 1/2	Continent of Europe	
1982	Burnham & Berrow Golf Club, England	Great Britain (United Kingdom) & Ireland (Republic of Ireland)	11	1	Continent of Europe	
1981	Gullane Golf Club, Scotland	Great Britain (United Kingdom) & Ireland (Republic of Ireland)	8	4	Continent of Europe	
1980	Formby Golf Club, England	Great Britain (United Kingdom) & Ireland (Republic of Ireland)	7	5	Continent of Europe	
1979	Kilmarnock (Barassie) Golf Club, Scotland	Great Britain (United Kingdom) & Ireland (Republic of Ireland)	9 1/2	2 1/2	Continent of Europe	
1978	Seaton Carew Golf Club, England	Continent of Europe	7	6	Great Britain (United Kingdom) & Ireland (Republic of Ireland)	
1977	Downfield Golf Club, Scotland	Continent of Europe	7	6	Great Britain (United Kingdom) & Ireland (Republic of Ireland)	
1967–1976: Tournament not played
1966	Moortown Golf Club, England	England & Scotland	10	2	Continent of Europe	
1965	Gullane Golf Club, Scotland	England & Scotland	12	1	Continent of Europe	
1964	Formby Golf Club, England	England & Scotland	12	1	Continent of Europe	
1963	Prestwick Golf Club, Scotland	England & Scotland	12	3	Continent of Europe	
1962	Royal Mid-Surrey Golf Club, England	England & Scotland	11	4	Continent of Europe	
1961	Dalmahoy Country Club, Scotland	England & Scotland	11	4	Continent of Europe	
1960	Olton Golf Club, England	England & Scotland	8	7	Continent of Europe	
1959	Pollok Golf Club, Scotland	England & Scotland	7	2	Continent of Europe	
1958	Moortown Golf Club, England	England & Scotland	11 1/2	0 1/2	Continent of Europe	

== Teams ==
There have been 9 players in each team since 1997.

=== Great Britain & Ireland ===
- 2026 Adam Fahey, Aidan Lawson, Aaron Moody, Harry O'Hara, Isaac Oliver, Charlie Rusbridge, Cole Self, Ben Sessions, George Whitehead
- 2025 Oli Blackadder, Ben Bolton, Harry Cox, John Doyle, Oscar Lent, Sam Marshall, Toby Peters, Dion Regan, Jack Swift
- 2024 Ben Bolton, Sebastian Desoisa, Daniel Hayes, Monty Holcombe, Oscar Lent, Dominic McGlinchey, Dion Regan, Charlie Rusbridge, Henry Styles
- 2023 Hugh Adams, Donnacha Cleary, Monty Holcombe, Sean Keeling, Kris Kim, Oliver Mukherjee, Jack Murphy, Dylan Shaw-Radford, Niall Sheils Donegan
- 2022 Josh Berry, Connor Graham, Josh Hill, Frank Kennedy, Oliver Mukherjee, Dylan Shaw-Radford, Niall Shiels Donegal, Harley Smith, Tyler Weaver
- 2021 Cameron Adam, Jack Bigham, Daniel Bullen, Archie Finnie, Connor Graham, Josh Hill, Joshua Hill, Ruben Lindsay, Harley Smith
- 2019 Barclay Brown, Archie Davies, Joshua Hill, Aaron Marshall, Tom McKibbin, Connor McKinney, Luke O'Neill, Joe Pagdin, Ben Schmidt
- 2018 Barclay Brown, Archie Davies, Conor Gough, Max Hopkins, Tom McKibbin, Connor McKinney, Joe Pagdin, Mark Power, Robin Williams
- 2017 Toby Briggs, Alex Fitzpatrick, Luke Harries, Darren Howie, Ben Jones, Thomas Plumb, Mark Power, Charlie Strickland, Robin Williams
- 2016 Toby Briggs, Alex Fitzpatrick, Harry Goddard, Kevin LeBlanc, Thomas Mulligan, Marco Penge, Mark Power, Jamie Stewart, Charlie Strickland
- 2015 Ben Chamberlain, Will Enefer, Calum Fyfe, Tim Harry, Bradley Moore, Thomas Mulligan, Marco Penge, Sandy Scott, Tom Williams
- 2014 George Burns, Jamie Dick, Ewen Ferguson, Tim Harry, Rowan Lester, Haydn McCullen, Bradley Moore, Marco Penge, Ashton Turner
- 2013 Ben Amor, Robin Dawson, Ewen Ferguson, Robert MacIntyre, Bradley Moore, Bradley Neil, Marco Penge, Connor Syme, Ashton Turner
- 2012 Harry Ellis, Matt Fitzpatrick, Alex Gleeson, Patrick Kelly, Gavin Moynihan, Bradley Neil, Max Orrin, Toby Tree, Ashton Turner
- 2011 David Boote, Harrison Greenberry, Gary Hurley, Nathan Kimsey, Paul Kinnear, Dermot McElroy, Gavin Moynihan, Callum Shinkwin, Toby Tree
- 2010 James Burnett, Adam Carson, Paul Dunne, Grant Forrest, Scott Gibson, Chris Lloyd, Paul Lockwood, Dermot McElroy, Rhys Pugh
- 2009 Jonathan Bell, Adam Carson, Sebastian Crookall-Nixon, Paul Dunne, Tom Lewis, Chris Lloyd, Eddie Pepperell, Paul Shields, Max Smith
- 2008 Alan Dunbar, Ben Enoch, Tommy Fleetwood, Stiggy Hodgson, Gary King, Luke Lennox, Tom Lewis, Eddie Pepperell, Michael Stewart
- 2007 James Byrne, Paul Cutler, Tommy Fleetwood, Fraser Fotheringham, Matt Haines, Jack Hiluta, Andrew Johnston, Eddie Pepperell, Michael Stewart
- 2006 James Byrne, Paul Cutler, Rhys Enoch, Luke Goddard, Sam Hutsby, Niall Kearney, Lewis Kirton, Matthew Nixon, Adam Runcie
- 2005 Matt Evans, Zac Gould, Tom Haylock, Scott Henry, Steven McEwan, Tom Sherreard, Mark Trow, Simon Ward, Danny Willett
- 2004 Matthew Baldwin, Gary Boyd, Jordan Findlay, Zac Gould, Scott Henry, Cian McNamara, Aaron O'Callaghan, Paul O'Hara, John Parry
- 2003 Wallace Booth, Rhys Davies, Daniel Denison, Tommy Hunter, Cian McNamara, Aaron O'Callaghan, Lloyd Saltman, Gareth Shaw, Paul Waring
- 2002 Clancy Bowe, Rhys Davies, Farren Keenan, Jamie Moul, Mark Pilling, Matthew Richardson, Gareth Shaw, Michael Skelton, Paul Waring
- 2001 Clancy Bowe, Stephen Buckley, Chris Cousins, James Heath, Scott Jackson, Farren Keenan, David Porter, Niall Turner, Daniel Wardrop
- 2000 Yasin Ali, Stephen Buckley, Jack Doherty, David Inglis, Derek McNamara, David Porter, Zane Scotland, Richard Scott, Joshua Simons
- 1999 Nick Dougherty, Scott Godfrey, Sandeep Grewal, Barry Hume, David Inglis, Mark O'Sullivan, David Porter, David Price, Zane Scotland
- 1998 Ian Campbell, Nick Dougherty, Adam Frayne, Justin Kehoe, David Griffiths, David Jones, John MacDougall, Steven O'Hara, Robin Symes
- 1997 Ian Campbell, Mark Campbell, Graham Gordon, David Jones, Richard Jones, Neil Matthews, Lee Rhind, Justin Rose, Phil Rowe
- 1996 Martin Brown, Kenneth Ferrie, David Jones, Mark Loftus, Morgan Palmer, Oliver Pughe, Justin Rose, Phil Rowe, Graeme Storm, Daniel Sugrue
- 1995 Grant Campbell, Luke Donald, Carl Duke, Graham Fox, Craig Lee, Jamie Little, Denny Lucas, Morgan Palmer, Tim Rice, Steven Young
- 1994 Steven Craig, Carl Duke, Alastair Forsyth, Gary Harris, Jamie Harris, Craig Heap, Jamie Little, Ciaran McMonagle, Stephen Raybould, Steve Webster
- 1993 James Bunch, R Davies, Gary Harris, James Healey, David Howell, Andrew McCormick, Sean Quinlivan, Stephen Raybould, A Wall, Steven Young
- 1992 Scott Drummond, Andrew Farmer, Stephen Gallacher, Hugh McKibbin, David Park, Sean Quinlivan, Alan Reid, Iestyn Taylor
- 1991 Raymond Burns, Stuart Cage, Richie Coughlan, Bradley Dredge, Craig Hislop, Iain Pyman, Murray Urquhart, Lee Westwood
- 1990 Neil Archibald, Raymond Burns, Richie Coughlan, Matthew Ellis, Garry Jack, Neil Macrae, Michael Welch, Lee Westwood
- 1989 Raymond Burns, Colin Fraser, Ian Garbutt, Pádraig Harrington, Richard Johnson, Raymond Russell, Murray Urquhart, Carl Watts
- 1988 Colin Fraser, Pádraig Harrington, Martin Hastie, Richard Johnson, Paul Page, Stuart Paul, Mike Smith, Stuart Syme
- 1987 Stuart Bannerman, David Bathgate, Andrew Coltart, Steve Docherty, David Errity, Wayne Henry, Gary McNeill, Jim Payne
- 1986 Jason Bennett, Neil Duncan, Steve Edgley, Paddy Gribben, Wayne Henry, Graham King, James Lee, Alan Tait
- 1985 Peter Baker, J Cook, Craig Everett, Jason Farrell, Wayne Henry, Graham King, James Lee, Eoghan O'Connell
- 1984 Peter Baker, Mark Brennan, Jason Farrell, Andrew Hare, William Owen, Phillip Price, Alan Turnbull, Lee Vannet
- 1983 Peter Baker, Jim Carvill, Calum Innes, Michael Macara, Jeremy Robinson, Lee Vannet, Reeves Weedon, Keith Williams
- 1982 Colin Brooks, David Gilford, Graeme Miller, Jacky Montgomery, John Morris, Roddy Park, Chris Rees, Andrew Saines
- 1981 Keith Dobson, Michael Few, Ronald Gregan, Adam Hunter, John McHenry, Stewart Scott, Craig Stewart, Martin Thompson
- 1980 Alan Currie, David Curry, Andrew Glen, Ronald Gregan, Michael McLean, G Miller, Mark Roe, Paul Way
- 1979 Gordon Dalgleish, Ian Ferguson, Peter Hammond, Lindsay Mann, Malcolm MacKenzie, Ronan Rafferty, Mark Tomlinson, Duncan Weir
- 1978 Colin Dalgleish, Ross Fraser, Stephen Keppler, Brendan McDaid, Mark Mouland, Roy Mugglestone, Jonathan Plaxton, John Queen, David Whelan
- 1977 Jeremy Bennett, Frank Coutts, Colin Dalgleish, Paul Downes, Ian Ford, John Huggan, Stephen Keppler, Mark Mouland, Roy Mugglestone
- 1966 Alasdair Black, John Cook, Bernard Gallacher, Michael King, John McTear, Alastair Milne, Andrew Phillips, Peter Tupling
- 1965 Sinclair Ferguson, Andrew Forrester, Bernard Gallacher, James Garland, Bill Lockie, Peter Oosterhuis, Ronnie Penman, Andrew Phillips, Richard Slee
- 1964 Andrew Brooks, Bill Lockie, George McKay, Peter Oosterhuis, Gordon Robert, Richard Slee, Derek Small, W Thomson, Peter Townsend
- 1963 Iain Clark, Leslie Crawford, Rod Lambert, Bill Lockie, Finlay Morris, Reg Radway, David Rigby, Derek Small, John Threlfall, Peter Townsend
- 1962 Brian Barnes, John Campbell, Clive Clark, Bill Hogg, Finlay Morris, Tom Pattison, Cameron Penman, Peter Townsend, Peter Wingfield
- 1961 Scott Cochran, Malcolm Cowell, Robert Hayes, Tony Jacklin, Scott Macdonald, Douglas Miller, Finlay Morris, Cameron Penman, A Wilson, David Winslow
- 1960 Paul Baxter, David Brown, Peter Green, Malcolm Gregson, John Martin, John McIntyre, William Rodger, Alan Scott, John Sharp, K Thomson
- 1959 Peter Brown, Peter Green, Richard Langridge, Alan Scott, Eddie Shamash, Hugh Stuart
- 1958 Jimmy Grant, Michael Hoyle, Gordon Hyde, Richard Langridge, H McDonald, David Simons, Ian Smith, Bobby Walker

=== Continent of Europe ===
- 2026 Mathias Aase, Gonzalo Baños, Óliver Elí Björnsson, Giampaolo Gagliardi, Louis Klein, Samuel Love Li, Youp Orsel, Tao Pemerika, Václav Švub
- 2025 Hugo Le Goff, Callixte Alzas, Giovanni Binaghi, Tom De Herrypon, Lev Grinberg, Guus Lafeber, Štěpán Plášek, Edwin Sjödin, Václav Švub
- 2024 Neo Berg, Giovanni Binaghi, Nils-Levi Bock, Arthur Carlier, Oscar Couilleau, Lev Grinberg, Hugo Le Goff, Viggo Olsson Mörk, Scott Woltering
- 2023 Louis Anceaux, Filip Fahlberg-Johnsson, Marcel Fonseca, Lev Grinberg, Jorge Siyuan Hao, Simon Hovdal, Hugo Le Goff, Peer Wernicke, Tim Wiedemeyer
- 2022 Thijmen Batens, Marco Florioli, Oïhan Guillamoundeguy, Tom Haberer, Albert Hansson, Jorge Siyuan Hao, Carl Siemens, Tim Wiedemeyer, William Wistrand
- 2021 Tiger Christensen, Riccardo Fantinelli, Marco Florioli, Oïhan Guillamoundeguy, Yannick Malik, Flavio Michetti, Jaime Montojo, Daniel Svärd, Tim Wiedemeyer
- 2019 Bård Bjørnevik Skogen, Matteo Cristoni, Daniel Da Costa Rodrigues, Loïc Ettlin, Charles Larcelet, Alvaro Mueller-Baumgart Lucena, David Puig, Tom Vaillant, Adam Wallin
- 2018 Eemil Alajärvi, Daniel Da Costa Rodrigues, Loïc Ettlin, Jerry Ji, David Puig, Eduard Rousaud Sabate, Saku Tuusa, Kiet van der Weele, Adam Wallin
- 2017 Alejandro Aguilera, Markus Braadlie, Adrien Dumont de Chassart, Falko Hanisch, Rasmus Højgaard, Matias Honkala, Pedro Lencart Silva, David Nyfjäll, Eduard Rousaud Sabate
- 2016 Alejandro Aguilera, Edgar Catherine, Jonathan Gøth-Rasmussen, Falko Hanisch, Pontus Nyholm, Adrien Pendaries, Kristoffer Reitan, Maximilian Schmitt, Marcus Svensson
- 2015 John Axelsen, Christoffer Bring, Viktor Hovland, Guido Migliozzi, Adrien Pendaries, Kristoffer Reitan, Maximilian Schmitt, Gisli Sveinbergsson, Tim Widing
- 2014 Oskar Bergqvist, Adam Blomme, Klaus Ganter, Marcus Kinhult, Stefano Mazzoli, Vítek Novák, Kristoffer Reitan, Vince van Veen, Federico Zuckermann
- 2013 Iván Cantero, Paul Elissalde, Dominic Foos, Mario Galiano, Michael Hirmer, Romain Langasque, Nicolas Manifacier, Renato Paratore, Kristoffer Ventura
- 2012 Giulio Castagnara, Dominic Foos, Mario Galiano, Romain Langasque, Renato Paratore, Hannes Rönneblad, Matthias Schwab, Kenny Subregis, Victor Tärnström
- 2011 Thomas Detry, Robin Goger, Florian Loutre, Gonçalo Pinto, Jon Rahm, Max Rottluff, Javier Sainz, Kenny Subregis, Kristoffer Ventura
- 2010 Thomas Detry, Stanislas Gautier, Domenico Geminiani, Kristian Krogh Johannessen, Moritz Lampert, Markus Maukner, Adrián Otaegui, Thomas Pieters, Thomas Sørensen
- 2009 Lucas Bjerregaard, Emilio Cuartero, Pedro Figueiredo, Toni Hakula, Robin Kind, Moritz Lampert, Maximilian Röhrig, Kasper Sørensen, Romain Wattel
- 2008 Emilio Cuartero, Daniel Jennevret, Maximilian Kieffer, Fredrik Kollevold, Matteo Manassero, Carlos Pigem, Kasper Sørensen, Cristiano Terragni, Romain Wattel
- 2007 Nikolai Aagaard, Floris de Vries, Édouard Dubois, Sean Einhaus, Pedro Figueiredo, Maximilian Kieffer, Daniel Løkke, Matteo Manassero, Christiano Terragni
- 2006 Björn Åkesson, Victor Dubuisson, Pedro Figueiredo, Lluís García del Moral, Jesper Kennegård, Anders Kristiansen, Andrea Pavan, Tim Sluiter, Marius Thorp
- 2005 Tristan Bierenbroodspot, Floris de Vries, Lluís García del Moral, Nicklas Glans, Jesper Kennegård, Kajetan Kromer, Andrea Pavan, Tim Sluiter, Marius Thorp
- 2004 Gonzalo Berlin, Knut Børsheim, Jorge Campillo, Wouter de Vries, Xavier Feyaerts, Lluis Garcia del Moral, Peter-Max Hamm, Peter Meldgaard, Andrea Pavan
- 2003 Federico Colombo, Wouter de Vries, Matteo Delpodio, Lorenzo Gagli, Stephan Gross, Mike Lorenzo-Vera, Pablo Martín, Pierre Relecom, Bernd Wiesberger
- 2002 Gustav Adell, Antti Ahokas, Peter Baunsee, Rafa Cabrera-Bello, Carlos del Moral, Oscar Florén, Mike Lorenzo-Vera, Pablo Martín, Andrea Romano
- 2001 Gustav Adell, Simone Brizzolari, Rafa Cabrera-Bello, Alejandro Cañizares, Raphaël de Sousa, Peter Erofejeff, Joachim Fourquet, Niklas Lemke, Bilbo Perrot
- 2000 Rafa Cabrera-Bello, Nicolas Colsaerts, Eduardo de la Riva, Raphaël de Sousa, Tim Ellis, Andreas Högberg, Alex Norén, Erik Stenman, Andrea Zanini
- 1999 Anders Bøgebjerg, Nicolas Colsaerts, Raphaël de Sousa, Xavier Guzmán, Anders Hofvander, Eirik Tage Johansen, Roberto Paolillo, Stefano Reale, Tuomas Tuovinen
- 1998 Raúl Ballesteros, Pascal Celhay, Nicolas Colsaerts, Michael Jørgensen, Mikko Korhonen, Edoardo Molinari, Roberto Paolillo, Stefano Reale, Rafael Vera
- 1997 Sergio García, Anders Hultman, Mikko Ilonen, Michael Jørgensen, Raúl Quirós, Stefano Reale, Ángel Luis Saura, Massimiliano Secci, Rafael Vera
- 1996 Joakim Bäckström, Kariem Baraka, Henrik Bjørnstad, Alexandre Henriques, Alessandro Napoleoni, Christian Nilsson, Christian Petersson, Raúl Quirós, Tino Schuster, Mads Vibe-Hastrup
- 1995 Joakim Bäckström, Christoph Bausek, Oliver David, Peter Davidsson, Sergio García, José Manuel Lara, Tino Schuster, Marco Soffietti, Philippe Touze, Mads Vibe-Hastrup
- 1994 Peter Davidsson, Henric Ingemarson, José Manuel Lara, David Smolin, Henrik Stenson, Michael Thannhäuser, Jonas Torines, Morten Vildhøj, Juan Vizcaya, Matteo Zaretti
- 1993 Kalle Brink, Johan Edfors, Diego Fiammengo, Richard Gillot, Viktor Gustavsson, Henric Ingemarson, Søren Kjeldsen, José Manuel Lara, Georges Plumet, Juan Vizcaya
- 1992 Thomas Biermann, Sébastien Delagrange, Petter Ederö, Freddie Jacobson, Christophe Ravetto, Luca Ruspa, Fabrice Stolear, Francisco Valera, Juan Vizcaya, Leif Westerberg
- 1991 Niels Boysen, Andrea Brotto, Didier de Vooght, Chris Hanell, Luca Ruspa, Rudi Sailer, Fabrice Stolear, Francisco Valera
- 1990 Patricio Beautell, Régis Bleze-Pascau, Francisco de Pablo, Frédéric Duger, Knut Ekjord, Mikael Persson, Johan Stålberg, Arild Townhill
- 1989 Carlos Beautell, Ralf Berhorst, Diego Borrego, Massimo Florioli, Marco Gortana, Gabriel Hjertstedt, Mikael Persson, Øyvind Rojahn
- 1988 Javier Ansorena, Thomas Bjørn, Diego Borrego, Frédéric Cupillard, Pierre Fulke, Jakob Greisen, Raimo Sjöberg, Jesper Thuen
- 1987 Éric Giraud, Jakob Greisen, Joakim Haeggman, Peter Hedblom, Peter Olsson, Nils Sallman, Ben Tinning, Romain Victor
- 1986 Jesús María Arruti, José Manuel Arruti, Joakim Haeggman, Nicola Hansen, Peter Hedblom, Lars Herne, Marco Mores, Marcello Santi
- 1985 Peter Digebjerg, Oliver Eckstein, Claus Gillitzer, Éric Giraud, Willem-Oege Goslings, Fredrlk Karlsson, Thomas Levet, Johan Remmelgas
- 1984 Søren Bjørn, Oliver Eckstein, Yvon Houssin, Fredrlk Karlsson, Friedrich Kötter, Adam Mednick, Henrik Simonsen, Daan Slooter
- 1983 Yago Beamonte, Håkan Eriksson, Jörg Kappmeier, Mikael Krantz, Fredrik Lindgren, José María Olazábal, Marc Pendariès, Peter Schwarze
- 1982 Emanuele Bolognesi, Luigi Figari, Ignacio Gervás, Jörg Kappmeier, Mikael Krantz, José María Olazábal, Jesper Parnevik, Marc Pendariès
- 1981 Tom Fredriksen, Christian Jung, Jesús López, José María Olazábal, Magnus Persson, Sergio Prati, Magnus Sunesson, Xavier Wenger
- 1980 G Chartier, G Comin, Marco Durante, Fabrizio Felici, Jesús López, Marc Pendariès, Magnus Persson, Steen Tinning
- 1979 Andrea Canessa, G Comin, Marco Durante, Jean-Charles Gassiat, Silvio Grappasonni, Jean LaMaison, Toni Lundahl, Steen Tinning
- 1978 Torbjörn Antevik, Andrea Canessa, Marco Durante, Anders Forsbrand, Silvio Grappasonni, François Illouz, Jean LaMaison, Andreas Stamm, Steen Tinning
- 1977 Carlo Alberto Acutis, Marco Durante, François Illouz, Mats Jonmarker, Christoph Prasthofer, Rolf Seliberg, Ove Sellberg, Ralf Thielemann, Alfonso Vidaor
- 1966 Jean Delgado, Jean-Michel Larretche, Staffan Mannerström, D Manuel (FRA), Tomas Persson, J C Santandrea (FRA), José Sousa-Mello, Philippe Toussaint
- 1965 Olivier Brizon, L Giuffre (ITA), Michele Goldschmid, Harald Jochums, G Leven (FRA), Bengt Malmquist, François Thevenin Lemoine, Philippe Toussaint, Hans Weinhofer
- 1964 Olivier Brizon, Yves Brose, Jean‐Charles Desbordes, Hervé Frayssineau, S Galard de Béarn (FRA), H Hoving (NED), Bernard Pascassio, François Thevenin Lemoine, Philippe Toussaint
- 1963 Lars Björneman, Olivier Brizon, Alberto Croze, Hervé Frayssineau, Patrick Frayssineau, Charles Kreglinger, M Rey (SWI), P Sondergaard (DNK), Rüdiger van Gülpen, Anders Werthén
- 1962 Lars Björk, Hervé Frayssineau, Patrick Frayssineau, Johan Jöhncke, Charles Kreglinger, D B Lane (PRT), Klaus Nierlich, Yves Saubaber, P Sondergaard (DNK), D Walli (SWI), Jürgen Weghmann
- 1961 S V Andersen (DNK), Stefano Cimatti, Patrick Cros, Martin Hodler, Hans-Hubert Giesen, Mats Göranson, Hans Hedjerson, Friedrich-Carl Janssen, Yves Saubaber, D Walli (SWI), Jürgen Weghmann
- 1960 S V Andersen (DNK), Carlo Bordogna, Patrick Cros, Alexis Godillot, H Moos (SWI), Jan Olsson, Krister Peil, Yves Saubaber, Enrico Sposetti, Jürgen Weghmann
- 1959 Prince Alexandre of Belgium, Carlo Bordogna, Patrick Cros, Alexis Godillot, Peter Jochums, Yves Saubaber
- 1958 Henri-Pierre Bonneau, Patrick Cros, S Gruhn (DNK), Jan Janssen, Claes Jöhncke, Jan Olsson, L Sabini (ITA), Lorenzo Silva, Bo Sallnäs, Henning Sonstmann

== See also ==
- St Andrews Trophy - the equivalent men's amateur event
- Junior Vagliano Trophy - the equivalent girls amateur event
