= Simon Wakefield =

English professional golfer

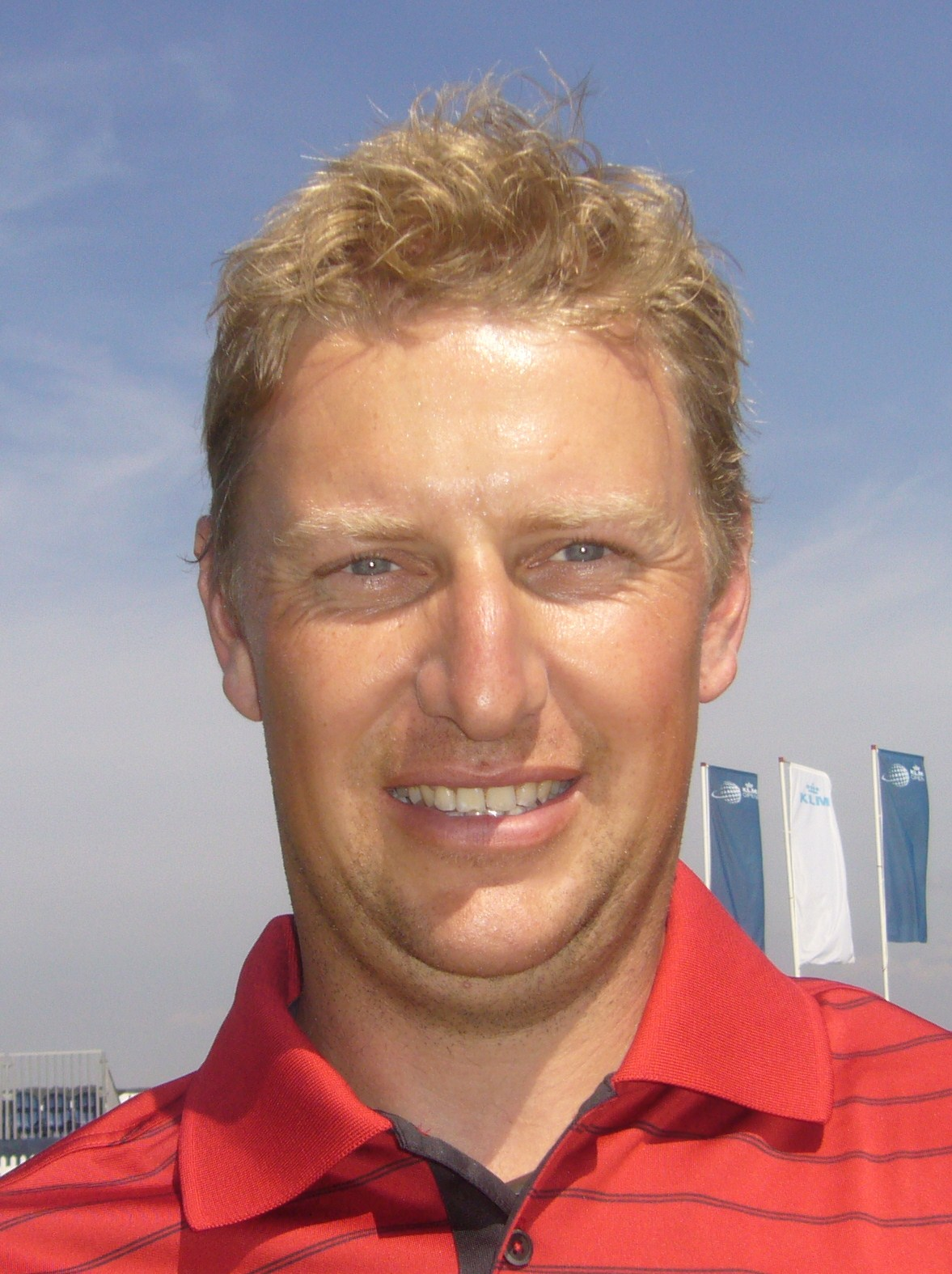
- Wakefield at the KLM Open in 2009

Personal information
- Nationality: England
- Born: 14 April 1974 (age 52) Newcastle-under-Lyme, England
- Height: 6 ft 2 in (1.88 m)

Career
- Sport: Golf
- Turned professional: 1997
- Former tours: European Tour; Sunshine Tour; Challenge Tour
- Professional wins: 2

Number of wins by tour
- Sunshine Tour: 1
- Challenge Tour: 1

Best results in major championships
- Masters Tournament: DNP
- PGA Championship: DNP
- U.S. Open: DNP
- The Open Championship: T19: 2008

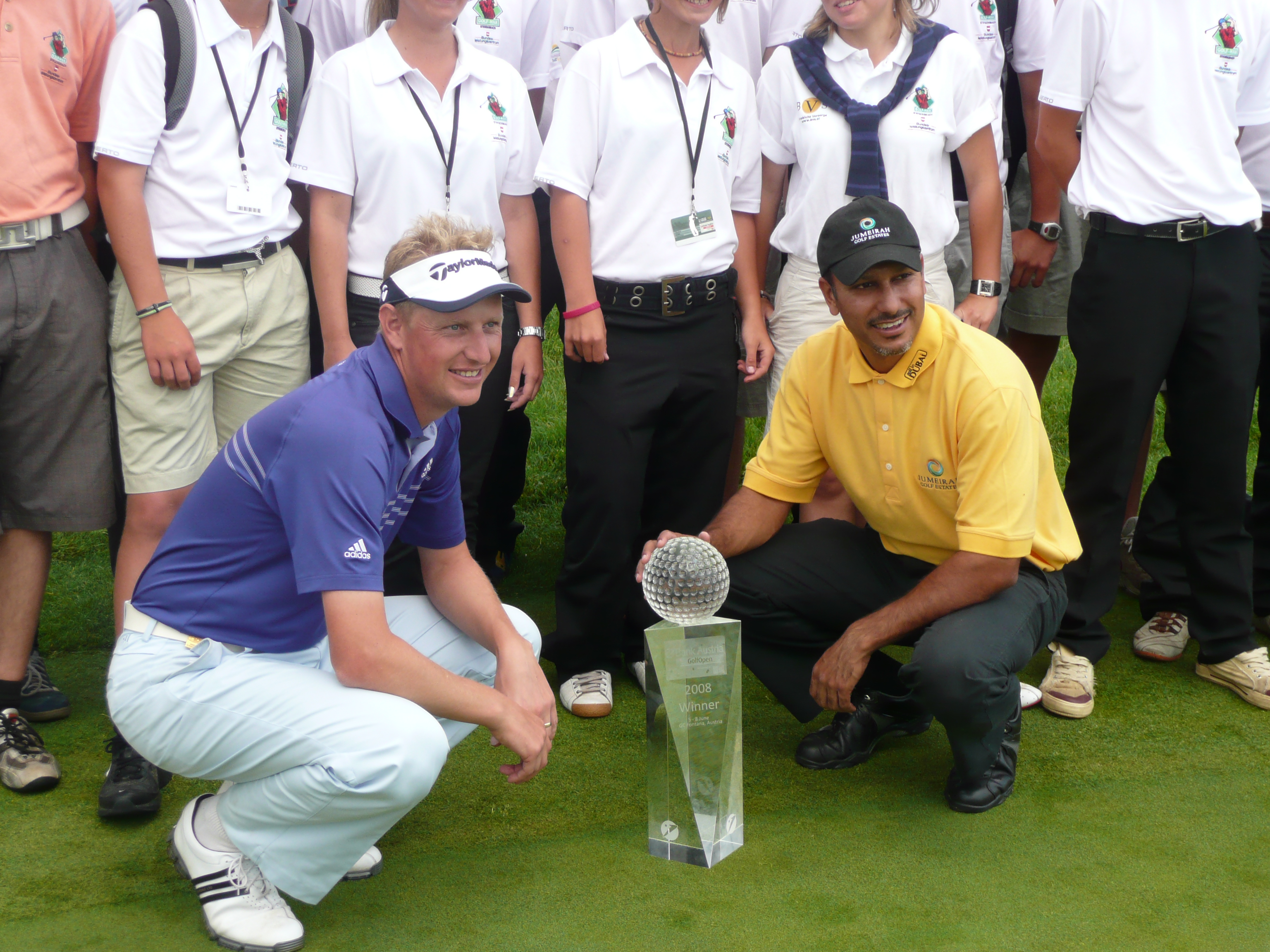
Wakefield at the 2008 Austrian Open, next to Jeev Milkha Singh

Simon Wakefield (born 14 April 1974) is an English professional golfer.

== Early life and amateur career ==
Wakefield was born in Newcastle-under-Lyme, Staffordshire and is the nephew of former England cricketer Bob Taylor. He won the 1996 Tillman Trophy in addition to several county amateur championships.

== Professional career ==
In 1997, he turned professional. Early in his career, Wakefield played predominantly on the second tier Challenge Tour before winning a place on the European Tour via qualifying school at the end of 1999. He failed to retain his tour card during his rookie season and dropped back to the Challenge Tour for 2001. He won his first professional tournament in 2002 at the Tessali Open del Sud, and went on to finish 9th on the Challenge Tour Rankings to graduate back to the European Tour for 2003.

Wakefield finished the 2003 European Tour season inside the top 100 on the Order of Merit to retain his card, but was back at the tour school at the end of 2004 having just missed out on keeping his place via the money list. He won his card back, and has secured his place on the European Tour since then with solid performances, although he has yet to win a tournament at the highest level. In 2005, he won his second professional title, the Dimension Data Pro-Am in South Africa.

== Amateur wins ==
- 1996 Tillman Trophy

== Professional wins (2) ==
=== Sunshine Tour wins (1) ===
No.	Date	Tournament	Winning score	Margin of victory	Runner-up
1	30 Jan 2005	Dimension Data Pro-Am	−9 (72-70-68-69=279)	3 strokes	(South Africa) Nic Henning

=== Challenge Tour wins (1) ===
No.	Date	Tournament	Winning score	Margin of victory	Runner-up
1	28 Apr 2002	Tessali Open del Sud	−10 (67-70-71-66=274)	1 stroke	(England) Andrew Raitt

Challenge Tour playoff record (0–1)

No.	Year	Tournament	Opponent	Result
1	2012	Scottish Hydro Challenge	(England) Sam Walker	Lost to birdie on third extra hole

== Playoff record ==
European Tour playoff record (0–2)

No.	Year	Tournament	Opponent	Result
1	2007	Johnnie Walker Championship at Gleneagles	(Scotland) Marc Warren	Lost to birdie on second extra hole
2	2011	Austrian Golf Open	(England) Kenneth Ferrie	Lost to birdie on first extra hole

== Results in major championships ==
Tournament	2003	2004	2005	2006	2007	2008
The Open Championship	CUT	CUT		T48		T19

Note: Wakefield only played in The Open Championship.

Did not play

CUT = missed the half-way cut
"T" = tied

== See also ==
- 2010 European Tour Qualifying School graduates
- 2012 Challenge Tour graduates
- 2013 European Tour Qualifying School graduates
