= Liam Bond =

Welsh professional golfer (born 1970)

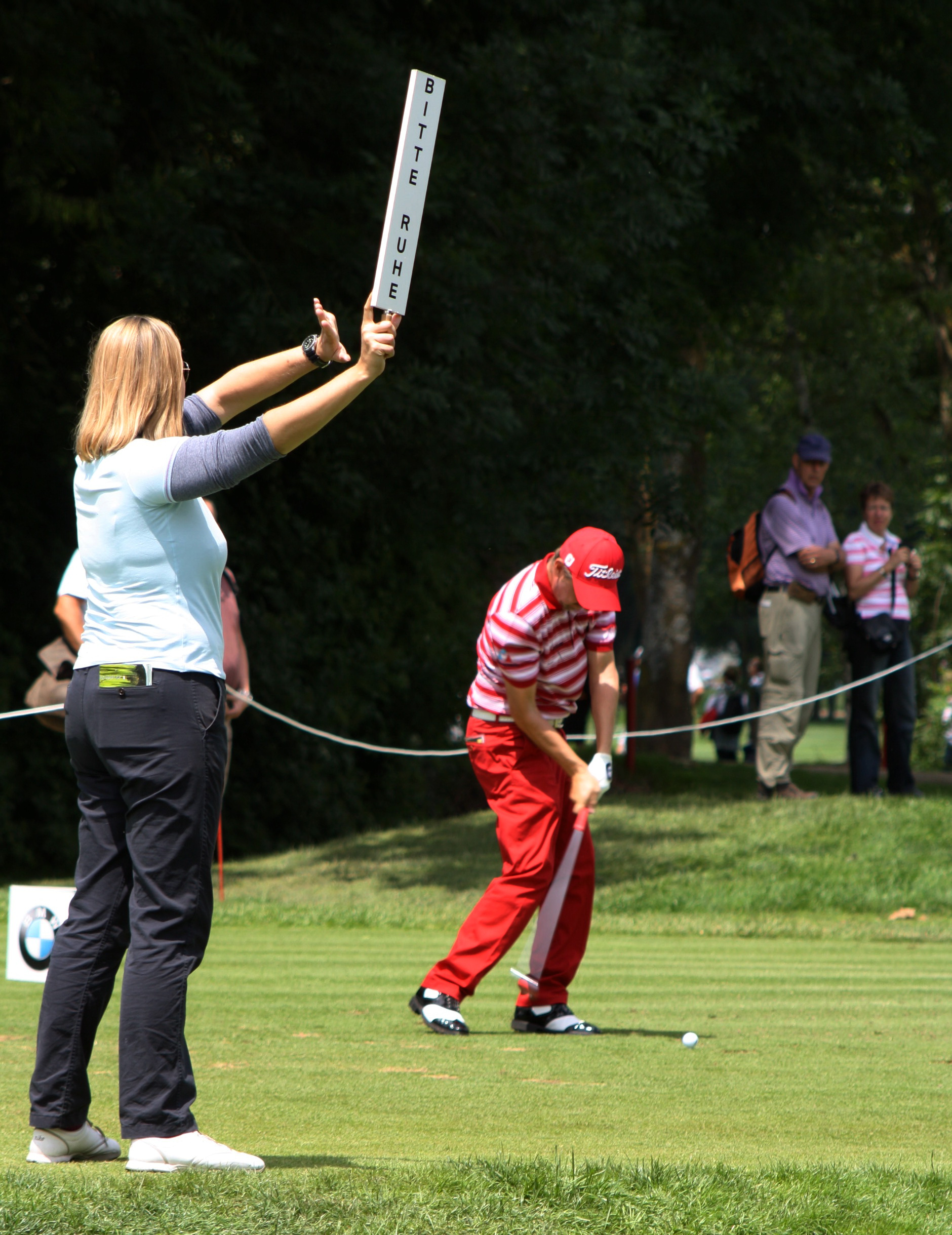
- Bond at the 2011 BMW International Open

Personal information
- Nationality: Wales
- Born: 29 July 1970 (age 56) Southport, Lancashire, England
- Height: 1.76 m (5 ft 9 in)
- Weight: 77 kg (170 lb; 12.1 st)
- Spouse: Emma (m. 1998)
- Children: 2

Career
- Sport: Golf
- Turned professional: 1986
- Former tours: European Tour; Challenge Tour
- Professional wins: 4

Liam Bond (born 29 July 1970) is a Welsh professional golfer.

== Professional career ==
Despite turning professional in 1986 while still in his mid-teens, Bond spent many years working as an assistant club professional, and didn't attempt to qualify for the European Tour until 1995. He won his own national championship in 1998, and finished 11th on the recently formed PGA EuroPro Tour in 2003, but didn't qualify for the second-tier Challenge Tour until 2007, when he was 36. His debut season at this level was successful, recording a runner-up finish in his second tournament and ending the year ranked 31st. He never bettered either achievement in the three subsequent years, but enjoyed steady seasons. At the end of 2010, Bond finally qualified for the European Tour for the first time at the age of 40, on his 15th visit to the qualifying school.

== Professional wins (4) ==
=== EuroPro Tour wins (2) ===
- 1999 MasterCard Tour Championship
- 2000 PGA Europro Tour Championship

=== Other wins (2) ===
- 1998 Welsh PGA Championship
- 2006 Beko Classic (Turkey)

== Playoff record ==
Challenge Tour playoff record (0–1)

No.	Year	Tournament	Opponent	Result
1	2007	Tessali-Metaponto Open di Puglia e Basilicata	(Northern Ireland) Michael Hoey	Lost to birdie on first extra hole

== See also ==
- 2010 European Tour Qualifying School graduates
