= Steve Surry =

English golfer (born 1982)

Personal information
- Full name: Steven Nicholas Surry
- Nationality: England
- Born: 11 February 1982 (age 44) Bath, England
- Height: 5 ft 11 in (1.80 m)

Career
- Sport: Golf
- Turned professional: 2003
- Current tour: Sunshine Tour
- Former tour: Challenge Tour
- Professional wins: 18

Number of wins by tour
- Sunshine Tour: 1
- Other: 17

Best results in major championships
- Masters Tournament: DNP
- PGA Championship: DNP
- U.S. Open: DNP
- The Open Championship: CUT: 2009

Steven Nicholas Surry (born 11 February 1982) is an English professional golfer.

== Career ==
Surry was born in Bath, Somerset and turned professional in 2003. In his early career he competed mostly on the regional Jamega Tour, where he won nine events and headed the Order of Merit in 2006 and 2008. He is attached to Cumberwell Park Golf Club near Bradford on Avon, Wiltshire.

In 2009, Surry won the Michael Ward UK Open on the PGA EuroPro Tour on his way to 4th place on the Order of Merit, earning him a place on the second tier Challenge Tour for 2010. He also qualified to play in the 2009 Open Championship, where he missed the cut.

Surry gained his Tour Card for the South Africa-based Sunshine Tour in 2011. He now splits his playing schedule between the Sunshine Tour, and returning to Great Britain for some EuroPro events during the African winter period.

== Professional wins (18) ==
=== Sunshine Tour wins (1) ===
No.	Date	Tournament	Winning score	Margin of victory	Runner-up
1	3 Nov 2018	Vodacom Origins of Golf Final	−6 (69-69-72=210)	4 strokes	(South Africa) Derick Petersen

Sunshine Tour playoff record (0–1)

No.	Year	Tournament	Opponent	Result
1	2019	Limpopo Championship	(South Africa) J. C. Ritchie	Lost to birdie on first extra hole

=== PGA EuroPro Tour wins (1) ===
No.	Date	Tournament	Winning score	Margin of victory	Runners-up
1	8 May 2009	Michael Ward UK Open	−1 (70-73-72=215)	1 stroke	(England) Paul Dwyer, (England) Simon Lilly, (Scotland) Elliot Saltman

=== Clutch Pro Tour wins (1) ===
No.	Date	Tournament	Winning score	Margin of victory	Runner-up
1	5 Jul 2021	Frilford Heath Classic	−4 (68)	Playoff	(England) Robin Orchison

=== Jamega Pro Golf Tour wins (15) ===
- 2004–2008 9 victories
- 2011 Cumberwell Park
- 2012 Cumberwell Park 1, Heythrop Park, Cumberwell Park 2
- 2013 The Vale of Glamorgan
- 2017 Royal Ascot

== Results in major championships ==
Tournament	2009
The Open Championship	CUT

Note: Surry only played in The Open Championship.
CUT = missed the half-way cut
