= Tim Sluiter =

Dutch professional golfer

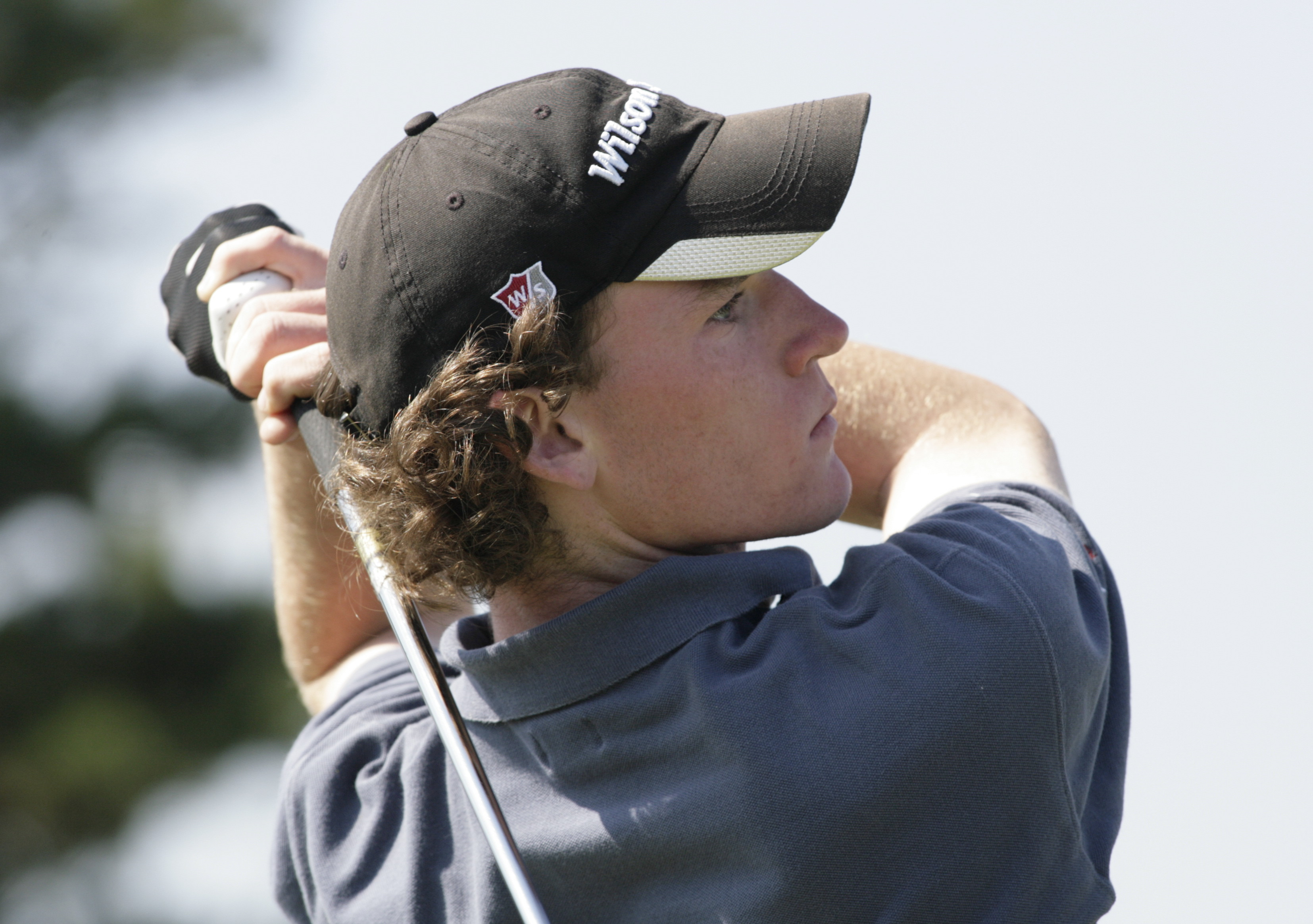

Personal information
- Nationality: Netherlands
- Born: 17 May 1989 (age 37) Enschede, Netherlands
- Height: 1.84 m (6 ft 0 in)
- Weight: 80 kg (180 lb; 13 st)

Career
- Sport: Golf
- College: University of Southern California
- Turned professional: 2009
- Former tours: European Tour; Challenge Tour; EPD Tour
- Professional wins: 2

Tim Sluiter (born 17 May 1989) is a Dutch professional golfer.

== Early life and amateur career ==
Sluiter was born in Enschede. After showing promise as an amateur, including winning the French Amateur, Sluiter took a golf scholarship to the University of Southern California in the United States. He won two intercollegiate tournaments, but chose to drop out of college after two years.

== Professional career ==
In 2009, Sluiter turned professional. In his debut full professional season in 2010, Sluiter won twice on the third-tier EPD Tour, and then came through qualifying school to secure a place on the European Tour in 2011.

== Amateur wins ==
- 2006 Dutch National U21 Championship, RiverWoods Dutch Junior Open, Dutch National Strokeplay Championship
- 2007 French Amateur
- 2008 USC Collegiate Invitational
- 2009 CordeValle Collegiate

== Professional wins (3) ==
=== EPD Tour wins (2) ===
No.	Date	Tournament	Winning score	Margin of Victory	Runner-up
1	18 Aug 2010	Chronos Cup	−12 (69-67-65=201)	9 strokes	(Germany) Torben Baumann
2	7 Sep 2010	Preis des Hardenberg GolfResort	−5 (67-70-71=208)	3 strokes	(Germany) Benjamin Miarka

=== Hi5 Pro Tour wins (1) ===
No.	Date	Tournament	Winning score	Margin of victory	Runner-up
1	3 Mar 2011	El Plantio Open	−11 (69-73-63=205)	3 strokes	(England) Chris Paisley

== Playoff record ==
Challenge Tour playoff record (0–1)

No.	Year	Tournament	Opponent	Result
1	2012	Allianz Open de Lyon	(Scotland) Chris Doak	Lost to par on third extra hole

== Team appearances ==
Amateur

- European Boys' Team Championship (representing the Netherlands): 2005, 2007
- Jacques Léglise Trophy (representing the Continent of Europe): 2005 (winners), 2006 (winners)
- European Youths' Team Championship (representing the Netherlands): 2006
- Eisenhower Trophy (representing the Netherlands): 2006 (winners)
- European Amateur Team Championship (representing the Netherlands): 2007, 2008, 2009
- Palmer Cup (representing Europe): 2008 (winners), 2009 (winners)
- St Andrews Trophy (representing the Continent of Europe): 2008

Professional

- World Cup (representing the Netherlands): 2013

== See also ==
- 2010 European Tour Qualifying School graduates
- 2011 European Tour Qualifying School graduates
