= Scott Jamieson (golfer) =

Scottish golfer

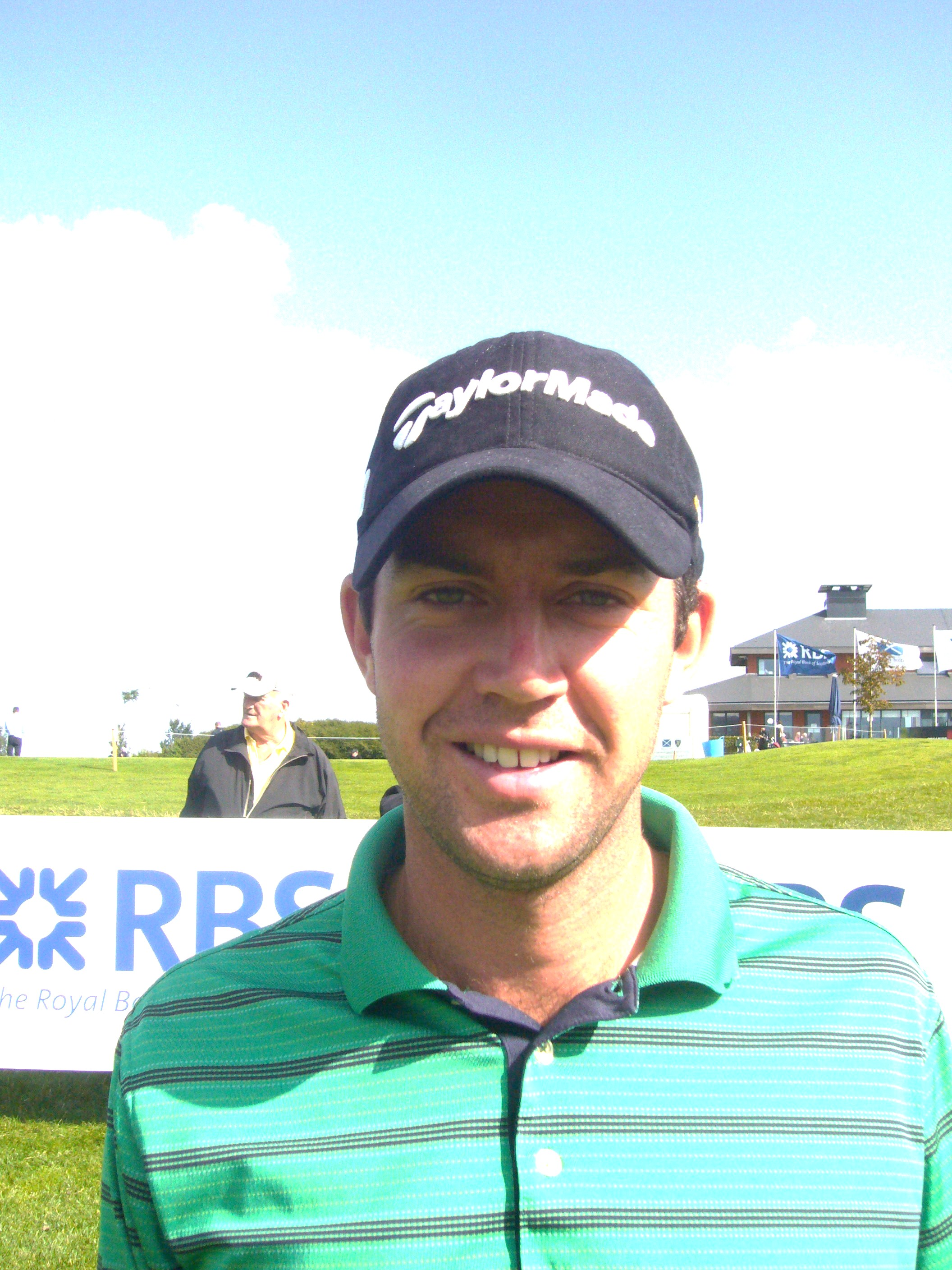
- Jamieson at the 2009 Dutch Futures

Personal information
- Nationality: Scotland
- Born: 28 November 1983 (age 42) Glasgow, Scotland
- Height: 1.85 m (6 ft 1 in)
- Weight: 80 kg (176 lb; 12 st 8 lb)
- Spouse: Natalie Jamieson
- Children: 3

Career
- Sport: Golf
- College: Augusta State University
- Turned professional: 2006
- Current tour: European Tour
- Former tours: Challenge Tour; PGA EuroPro Tour
- Professional wins: 4
- Highest ranking: 68 (3 February 2013)

Number of wins by tour
- European Tour: 2
- Sunshine Tour: 1
- Other: 2

Best results in major championships
- Masters Tournament: DNP
- PGA Championship: T29: 2013
- U.S. Open: DNP
- The Open Championship: CUT: 2011, 2013, 2014, 2018

Achievements and awards
- PGA EuroPro Tour Order of Merit winner: 2009

Scott Jamieson (born 28 November 1983) is a Scottish professional golfer who plays on the European Tour.

== Amateur career ==
Jamieson was born in Glasgow, Scotland. He spent four years playing amateur golf on a scholarship at Augusta State University. His amateur career culminated with him representing Scotland in the 2006 Eisenhower Trophy, turning professional later the same year.

== Professional career ==
After a slow start to his professional career, Jamieson won twice on the third-tier PGA EuroPro Tour in 2009, on his way to topping the Order of Merit; he also recorded four top-20 finishes on the Challenge Tour toward the end of the year, playing off invitations. Jamieson's 2009 performance earned him full Challenge Tour status for 2010, and he produced another successful season: top-20 finishes in his final six tournaments, including a runner-up placing in the Kazakhstan Open, boosted him to 14th in the rankings, and promotion to the European Tour.

Jamieson's rookie year on the European Tour got off to a quick start, as he recorded top-10 finishes in two of his first six tournaments, the Joburg Open in January and the Sicilian Open in March. He then embarked on a golden summer, recording his best European Tour finish with a 3rd place in the Open de España, then matching it in the BMW International Open and the Barclays Scottish Open. The latter of these gave Jamieson his largest payday to date, and qualified him for the first major of his career, the 2011 Open Championship.

Jamieson won for the first time on tour at The Nelson Mandela Championship in December 2012, the first event of the 2013 season. In a tournament heavily affected by rain, with par reduced to 65 and only two rounds possible, he pipped Steve Webster and Eduardo de la Riva on the second hole of a playoff. A month later, he led Volvo Golf Champions by 5 strokes after 3 rounds, but failed to win his second European Tour title, finished 2nd, one stroke behind Louis Oosthuizen.

After finishing runner-up to Branden Grace at the 2017 Nedbank Golf Challenge, where he pocketed more than €700,000, Jamieson finished a career-best 26th on the European Tour Race to Dubai and, that winter, he relocated to Florida with his wife, Natalie, and two children.

== Amateur wins ==
- 2001 Scottish Boys Strokeplay Championship

== Professional wins (4) ==
=== European Tour wins (2) ===
No.	Date	Tournament	Winning score	Margin of victory	Runner(s)-up
1	9 Dec 2012 (2013 season)	Nelson Mandela Championship^{1}	−7 (66-57=123) (Note: Shortened to 36 holes due to weather.)	Playoff	(Spain) Eduardo de la Riva, (England) Steve Webster
2	23 Aug 2026	Nexo Championship	−11 (70-71-69-67=277)	2 strokes	(England) Matthew Jordan

^{1}Co-sanctioned by the Sunshine Tour

European Tour playoff record (1–0)

No.	Year	Tournament	Opponents	Result
1	2012	Nelson Mandela Championship	(Spain) Eduardo de la Riva, (England) Steve Webster	Won with par on second extra hole de la Riva eliminated by par on first hole

=== PGA EuroPro Tour wins (2) ===
No.	Date	Tournament	Winning score	Margin of victory	Runner-up
1	11 Jun 2009	Partypoker.com European Championship	−9 (67-70-70=207)	Playoff	(Scotland) Elliot Saltman
2	13 Aug 2009	ABC Solutions UK Championship	−12 (71-65-68=204)	7 strokes	(England) James Ruebotham

== Results in major championships ==
Tournament	2011	2012	2013	2014	2015	2016	2017	2018
Masters Tournament								
U.S. Open								
The Open Championship	CUT		CUT	CUT				CUT
PGA Championship			T29					

Did not play

CUT = missed the half-way cut
"T" = tied

== Results in World Golf Championships ==
Tournament	2013
Match Play	
Championship	T23
Invitational	
Champions	

Did not play

"T" = Tied

== Team appearances ==
Amateur

- European Boys' Team Championship (representing Scotland): 2001
- European Youths' Team Championship (representing Scotland): 2002, 2004 (winners)
- Palmer Cup (representing Europe): 2005
- Eisenhower Trophy (representing Scotland): 2006

Professional

- Seve Trophy (representing Great Britain & Ireland): 2011 (winners), 2013

== See also ==
- 2010 Challenge Tour graduates
