= Marco Durante (golfer) =

Italian golfer

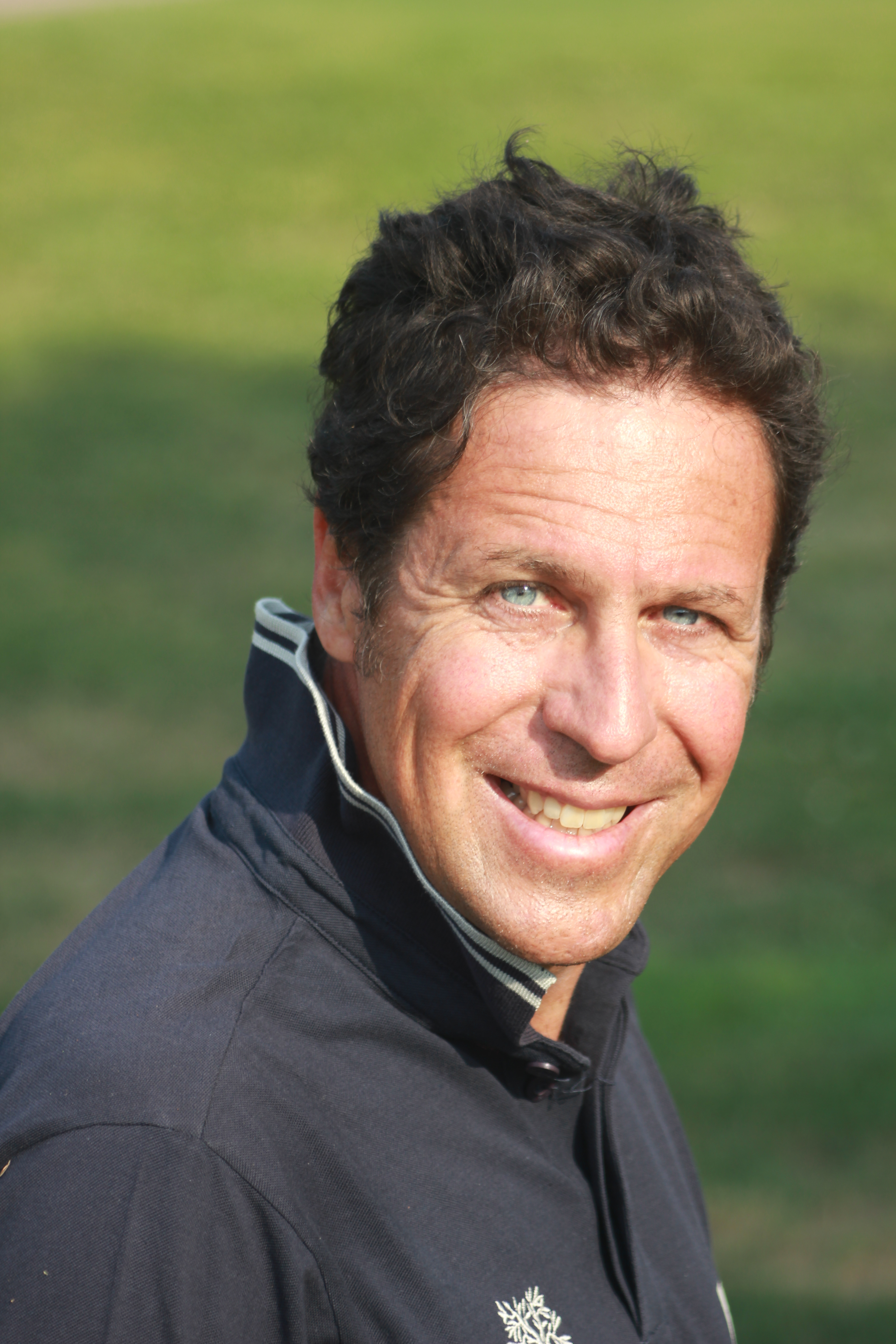
Marco Durante

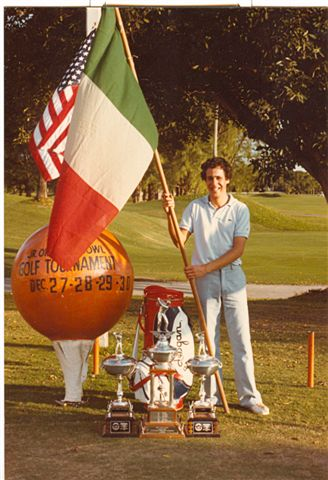
Marco Durante Orange Bowl 1979

Marco Durante (born 24 October 1962) is an Italian golfer.

== Biography ==
Durante was born in Sanremo. He was introduced to golf in 1969 under the guidance of Franco Zanini in Garlenda, Italy. He won his first Italian title in the Second Category National Championship in 1976. In 1977 he made his debut in the Amateur National Team at the Junior European Championship in Oslo, and he was part of the team until the end of 1987, taking part to 9 European Championships, to the Pinehurst World Championship (USA, 1980), to the University World Championship in Is Molas (ITA), where his team won the tournament and he was placed 4th individually.

In his amateur career the most important achievement was the first place at the 1979 Junior Orange Bowl in Miami, the first non-American player to win the title. Other noteworthy achievements are the 1981 Aer Lingus Trophy in Dublin, including a course record 65 at the Royal Dublin G.C; the 1987 Swiss International Championship after beating François Illouz after a playoff; seven Italian Titles, including the 1981 Medal National Championship with the course record of 70 at G.C. Le Betulle in Biella and the 1981 Italian International Championship, after a playoff against Craig Francis.

He played in the European Team in a number of matches against GB & Ireland (Jacques Léglise Trophy - Boys, 1977–80; Juniors, 1980; St Andrews Trophy 1980). In 1977 he was in the first continental team which defeated the British Islands on their course (Dundee, 1977), the success being repeated in 1980 by the Junior team in Lund, Sweden.

At the end of 1987 he turns professional, joining the National Team of which he will be part of until 1999. As a professional he won the 1989 Triconfort Open (Challenge Tour) and the Città di Fiuggi Trophy (ITA, 1990); he represented Italy in the qualifying stage of the 1993 Dunhill Cup in Taiwan, he came second at the Italian Omnium Championship (1990), at the Italian Match-play Championship (1990) and at the 1991 Italian PGA Championship. With Andrea Canessa he won the Italian PGA Pairs Championship (1998).

At the end of his professional career he turned to sport management: councillor of the Italian Golf Federation (FIG) since 2001 until October 2024, supervisor of the Technic Professional Branch since 2002 until 2024 and representative of the Legal Affairs Committee; councillor of the Italian PGA (from 1988 to March 2013); National Councillor of CONI since 2005 (reconfirmed for the four-year term 2013–16); Vice President of National Athletes Committee for the four-year term 2009–12; President of National Athletes Committee for the four-year term 2013–16.; President of the Alps Tour Golf Association, based in France, from 2017

== Professional wins (1) ==
=== Challenge Tour wins (1) ===
- 1989 Triconfort Open

== Team appearances ==
Amateur

- Jacques Léglise Trophy (representing the Continent of Europe): 1977 (winners), 1978 (winners), 1979, 1980
- St Andrews Trophy (representing the Continent of Europe): 1980
