= David Horsey (golfer) =

English professional golfer

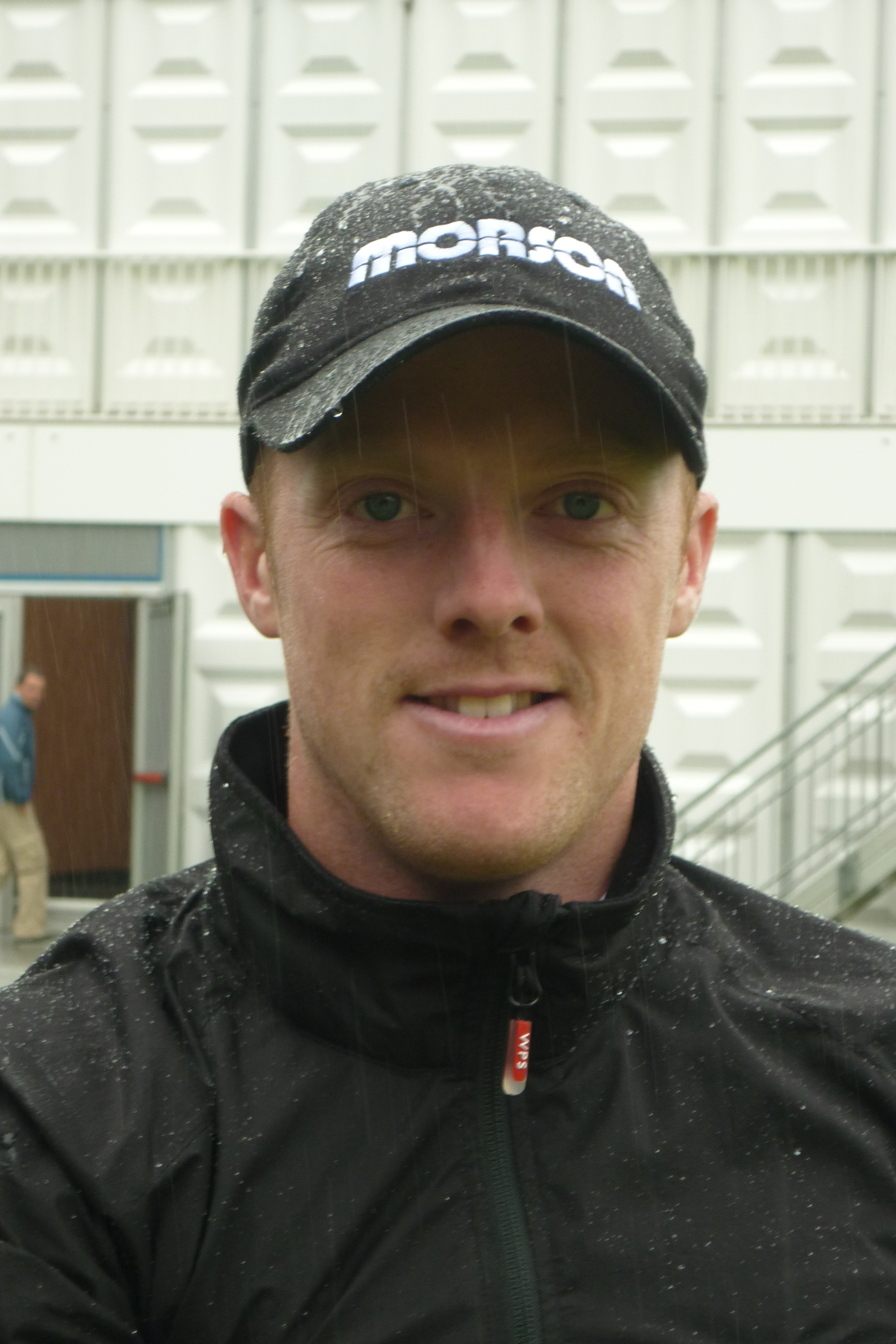
- Horsey at the 2010 KLM Open

Personal information
- Full name: David Horsey
- Nationality: England
- Born: 14 April 1985 (age 41) Stockport, England
- Height: 5 ft 10 in (1.78 m)
- Spouse: Sophie Horsey
- Children: 1

Career
- Sport: Golf
- Turned professional: 2007
- Current tour: European Tour
- Former tour: Challenge Tour
- Professional wins: 7
- Highest ranking: 77 (26 September 2010)

Number of wins by tour
- European Tour: 4
- Challenge Tour: 3

Best results in major championships
- Masters Tournament: DNP
- PGA Championship: T28: 2010
- U.S. Open: CUT: 2009, 2023
- The Open Championship: T67: 2008

Achievements and awards
- Challenge Tour Rankings winner: 2008

David Horsey (born 14 April 1985) is an English professional golfer. He currently plays on the European Tour. Horsey has won four events on the tour between 2010 and 2015.

== Amateur career ==
Horsey had a successful amateur career. He finishing as runner-up at the 2004 English Amateur. He won the 2005 Greek Amateur Championship. He represented Great Britain and Ireland at the Walker Cup.

Horsey appeared twice as an amateur at the Challenge Tour's Oceânico Developments Pro-Am Challenge which is held near his hometown. In 2007, he recorded a tie for 13th.

== Professional career ==
In 2007, Horsey turned professional. He played three more events on Europe's development tour, before making his third attempt to win a place on the elite European Tour via qualifying school, but like his previous efforts, he failed to get through to the final stage.

In his first full season on the Challenge Tour in 2008, Horsey recorded two victories, at the Telenet Trophy and the AGF-Allianz EurOpen de Lyon, and seven other top-ten finishes, as he ended the year on top of the rankings to graduate to the European Tour for 2009. During 2008, he also received several invites to full European Tour events, the highlight of which was his début appearance on the tour at the MasterCard Masters, where he finished in a tie for 5th place.

In February 2009, Horsey collected the biggest cheque of his career by posting a final round 64 at the Maybank Malaysian Open to finish as joint runner-up, just one stroke behind winner Anthony Kang. He retained his card for 2010, finishing within the top 100 of the Race to Dubai.

In June 2010, Horsey achieved his first European Tour win at the 2010 BMW International Open. He finished the season ranked 32nd on the Order of Merit.

In April 2011, Horsey won his second European Tour event, the Trophée Hassan II. He defeated Rhys Davies and Jaco van Zyl at the second playoff hole with a birdie 3 while Davies and van Zyl parred. After finishing 7th in the 2011 BMW PGA Championship Horsey reached a career high of 77 in the world rankings.

== Amateur wins ==
- 2005 Greek Amateur Open Championship

== Professional wins (7) ==
=== European Tour wins (4) ===
No.	Date	Tournament	Winning score	Margin of victory	Runner(s)-up
1	27 Jun 2010	BMW International Open	−18 (69-67-67-67=270)	1 stroke	(England) Ross Fisher
2	3 Apr 2011	Trophée Hassan II	−13 (67-71-67-69=274)	Playoff	(Wales) Rhys Davies, (South Africa) Jaco van Zyl
3	27 Jul 2014	M2M Russian Open	−13 (65-68-70-72=275)	Playoff	(Republic of Ireland) Damien McGrane
4	23 Aug 2015	Made in Denmark	−13 (63-67-68-73=271)	2 strokes	(Sweden) Kristoffer Broberg, (Australia) Daniel Gaunt, (Denmark) Søren Kjeldsen, (Australia) Terry Pilkadaris

European Tour playoff record (2–0)

No.	Year	Tournament	Opponent(s)	Result
1	2011	Trophée Hassan II	(Wales) Rhys Davies, (South Africa) Jaco van Zyl	Won with birdie on second extra hole
2	2014	M2M Russian Open	(Republic of Ireland) Damien McGrane	Won with par on first extra hole

=== Challenge Tour wins (3) ===
No.	Date	Tournament	Winning score	Margin of victory	Runner(s)-up
1	22 Jun 2008	Telenet Trophy	−19 (67-66-68-68=269)	1 stroke	(Netherlands) Wil Besseling, (Denmark) Søren Juul
2	6 Jul 2008	AGF-Allianz EurOpen de Lyon	−22 (65-68-68-65=266)	1 stroke	(England) Marcus Higley
3	29 Jun 2025	Le Vaudreuil Golf Challenge	−16 (72-66-65-69=272)	Playoff	(England) James Allan, (Spain) Joseba Torres, (Scotland) Daniel Young

Challenge Tour playoff record (1–0)

No.	Year	Tournament	Opponents	Result
1	2025	Le Vaudreuil Golf Challenge	(England) James Allan, (Spain) Joseba Torres, (Scotland) Daniel Young	Won with birdie on first extra hole

== Results in major championships ==
Tournament	2008	2009	2010	2011	2012	2013	2014	2015	2016	2017	2018
Masters Tournament											
U.S. Open		CUT									
The Open Championship	T67									CUT	
PGA Championship			T28	CUT							

Tournament	2019	2020	2021	2022	2023
Masters Tournament					
PGA Championship					
U.S. Open					CUT
The Open Championship		NT			

Did not play

CUT = missed the half-way cut
"T" = tied
NT = No tournament due to the COVID-19 pandemic

== Results in World Golf Championships ==
Tournament	2010
Match Play	
Championship	
Invitational	T71
Champions	T48

Did not play

"T" = Tied

== Team appearances ==
Amateur

- European Youths' Team Championship (representing England): 2006
- European Amateur Team Championship (representing England): 2007
- Walker Cup (representing Great Britain & Ireland): 2007

Professional

- Seve Trophy (representing Great Britain & Ireland): 2011 (winners)

== See also ==
- 2008 Challenge Tour graduates
- 2022 European Tour Qualifying School graduates
