= Pierre Relecom =

Belgian professional golfer (born 1985)

Personal information
- Nationality: Belgium
- Born: 12 July 1985 (age 41) Brussels, Belgium
- Height: 1.93 m (6 ft 4 in)
- Weight: 87 kg (192 lb; 13.7 st)

Career
- Sport: Golf
- Turned professional: 2008
- Current tour: Challenge Tour
- Professional wins: 1

Number of wins by tour
- Challenge Tour: 1

Pierre Relecom (born 12 July 1985) is a Belgian professional golfer.

== Career ==
Relecom has played on the Challenge Tour since 2008. He won his first title in July 2014 at the Swiss Challenge.

== Professional wins (1) ==
=== Challenge Tour wins (1) ===
No.	Date	Tournament	Winning score	Margin of victory	Runner-up
1	20 Jul 2014	Swiss Challenge	−15 (70-63-68-68=269)	1 stroke	(Italy) Niccolo Quintarelli

== Team appearances ==
Amateur

- Eisenhower Trophy (representing Belgium): 2004, 2006
- Jacques Léglise Trophy (representing Continental Europe): 2003, 2024 (non-playing captain, winners)
