= Madeira Islands Open =

Coordinates: 32.7217°N 16.8039°W

Tournament information
- Location: Madeira Islands, Portugal
- Established: 1993
- Course: Clube de Golf do Santo da Serra
- Par: 72
- Length: 6,826 yards (6,242 m)
- Tours: European Tour; Challenge Tour
- Format: Stroke play
- Prize fund: €600,000
- Month played: July/August
- Final year: 2015

Tournament record score
- Aggregate: 264 Roope Kakko (2015)
- To par: −24 as above

Final champion
- (Finland) Roope Kakko
- Location relative to Africa Location in Madeira

The Madeira Islands Open was a men's professional golf tournament on the European Tour played from 1993 to 2015 on Madeira, an autonomous region of Portugal.

== History ==
The tournament had one of the smallest prize funds on the tour (€600,000 in 2015), and few of the tour's top players took part. From 2002 to 2005, and again from 2011 to 2015, it was a dual-ranking event with the Challenge Tour. It was played opposite the Volvo World Match Play Championship in 2011 and 2013. In 2015, it was played opposite the Saltire Energy Paul Lawrie Match Play after the rescheduling caused by severe weather postponed the event four months.

It was hosted at Clube de Golf do Santo da Serra (1993–2008, 2012–15) and at Porto Santo Golfe (2009–11). For its last five years of existence, it was one of two European Tour events annually staged in Portugal, the other being the Portugal Masters. The 2015 event was rescheduled from March to August due to weather.

== Winners ==
Year	Tour(s) (Note: CHA − Challenge Tour; EUR − European Tour.)	Winner	Score	To par	Margin of victory	Runner(s)-up
Madeira Islands Open - Portugal - BPI
2015	CHA, EUR	(Finland) Roope Kakko	264	−24	3 strokes	(Scotland) Scott Henry
2014	CHA, EUR	(England) Daniel Brooks	135 (Note: Shortened to 36 holes due to weather.)	−9	Playoff	(Scotland) Scott Henry
2013	CHA, EUR	(United States) Peter Uihlein	273	−15	2 strokes	(Denmark) Morten Ørum Madsen (Chile) Mark Tullo
Madeira Islands Open - Portugal
2012	CHA, EUR	(Portugal) Ricardo Santos	266	−22	4 strokes	(Sweden) Magnus A. Carlsson
Madeira Islands Open
2011	CHA, EUR	(Northern Ireland) Michael Hoey	278	−10	2 strokes	(England) Jamie Elson (England) Chris Gane
Madeira Islands Open BPI - Portugal
2010	EUR	(England) James Morrison	268	−20	1 stroke	(England) Oliver Fisher
2009	EUR	(Argentina) Estanislao Goya	278	−6	1 stroke	(Scotland) Callum Macaulay
2008	EUR	(Scotland) Alastair Forsyth	273	−15	Playoff	(South Africa) Hennie Otto
Madeira Islands Open BPI
2007	EUR	(Argentina) Daniel Vancsik	270	−18	7 strokes	(South Africa) David Frost (Spain) Santiago Luna
Madeira Island Open Caixa Geral de Depositos
2006	EUR	(France) Jean van de Velde	273	−15	1 stroke	(England) Lee Slattery
2005	CHA, EUR	(Netherlands) Robert-Jan Derksen	275	−13	2 strokes	(South Africa) Andrew McLardy (Scotland) Gary Orr
Madeira Island Open
2004	CHA, EUR	(Sweden) Chris Hanell	284	−4	1 stroke	(Sweden) Steven Jeppesen (Australia) Brad Kennedy (United States) Rob Rashell
2003	CHA, EUR	(Wales) Bradley Dredge	272	−16	8 strokes	(Sweden) Fredrik Andersson (England) Brian Davis (England) Andrew Marshall
2002	CHA, EUR	(Spain) Diego Borrego	281	−7	1 stroke	(Spain) Ivó Giner (Netherlands) Maarten Lafeber
2001	EUR	(Republic of Ireland) Des Smyth	270	−18	2 strokes	(England) John Bickerton
2000	EUR	(Sweden) Niclas Fasth	279	−9	2 strokes	(England) Mark Davis (Scotland) Ross Drummond (Sweden) Richard S. Johnson
1999	EUR	(Spain) Pedro Linhart	276	−12	1 stroke	(England) Mark James
1998	EUR	(Sweden) Mats Lanner (2)	277	−11	1 stroke	(New Zealand) Stephen Scahill
1997	EUR	(England) Peter Mitchell	204 (Note: Shortened to 54 holes due to weather.)	−12	1 stroke	(Sweden) Freddie Jacobson
1996	EUR	(Sweden) Jarmo Sandelin	279	−9	1 stroke	(Wales) Paul Affleck
1995	EUR	(Spain) Santiago Luna	272	−16	4 strokes	(France) Christian Cévaër
1994	EUR	(Sweden) Mats Lanner	206	−10	2 strokes	(England) Howard Clark (Sweden) Mathias Grönberg (Sweden) Peter Hedblom
1993	EUR	(England) Mark James	281	−7	3 strokes	(England) Gordon J. Brand (England) Paul Broadhurst
