= Daniel Brooks (golfer) =

English golfer (born 1987)

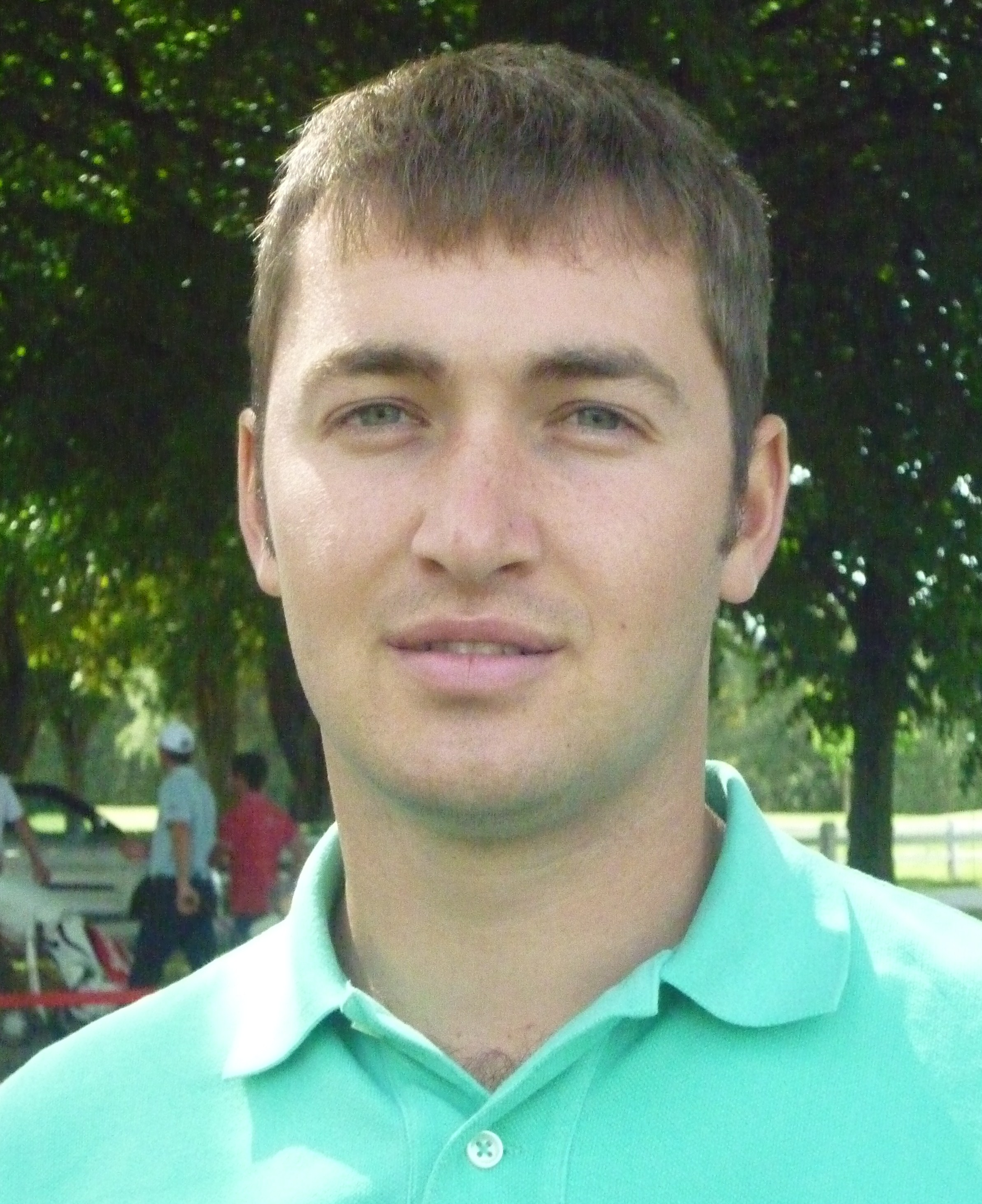

Personal information
- Nationality: England
- Born: 5 January 1987 (age 39) Basildon, England
- Height: 6 ft 1 in (1.85 m)
- Weight: 167 lb (76 kg; 11.9 st)

Career
- Sport: Golf
- Turned professional: 2007
- Current tour: Challenge Tour
- Former tours: European Tour; PGA EuroPro Tour
- Professional wins: 6

Number of wins by tour
- European Tour: 1
- Challenge Tour: 1
- Other: 5

Best results in major championships
- Masters Tournament: DNP
- PGA Championship: DNP
- U.S. Open: DNP
- The Open Championship: CUT: 2015

Daniel Brooks (born 5 January 1987) is an English professional golfer who currently plays on the Challenge Tour, having previously played on the European Tour and PGA EuroPro Tour.

== Professional career ==
Brooks turned professional in 2007 and spent his first three years as a professional playing on the PGA EuroPro Tour. In 2009, Brooks recorded his first and only win on the PGA EuroPro Tour at the Sureshot GPS International Open at Bovey Castle.

In 2010, Brooks joined the Challenge Tour after failing to gain his European Tour playing rights at qualifying school for the second consecutive year in 2009. Brooks continued to play on the Challenge Tour for the 2011 and 2012 seasons. He earned his first European Tour card by finishing 21st on the 2012 Challenge Tour rankings. In 2013 he split his time between the two tours before re-earning his playing rights on the European Tour for the 2014 season at qualifying school in 2013. This success at qualifying school was his first in six attempts.

Brook's made a good start to his 2014 European Tour season, making the cut in each of his first eight competition before achieving his maiden European Tour victory at the 2014 Madeira Islands Open - Portugal - BPI in just his ninth start on tour. The win was overshadowed by the death of Alastair Forsyth's caddie, Iain McGregor, of a heart attack during play, with many people criticising the decision to play on and complete the tournament following the death.

Although Brooks finished 140th in the Race to Dubai (thirty places outside the final guaranteed exempt position), his win exempted him for the 2015 season.

== Professional wins (6) ==
=== European Tour wins (1) ===
No.	Date	Tournament	Winning score	Margin of victory	Runner-up
1	11 May 2014	Madeira Islands Open - Portugal - BPI^{1}	−9 (68-67=135) (Note: Shortened to 36 holes due to weather.)	Playoff	(Scotland) Scott Henry

^{1}Dual-ranking event with the Challenge Tour

European Tour playoff record (1–0)

No.	Year	Tournament	Opponent	Result
1	2014	Madeira Islands Open - Portugal - BPI	(Scotland) Scott Henry	Won with par on first extra hole

=== Challenge Tour wins (1) ===
No.	Date	Tournament	Winning score	Margin of victory	Runner-up
1	11 May 2014	Madeira Islands Open - Portugal - BPI^{1}	−9 (68-67=135)	Playoff	(Scotland) Scott Henry

^{1}Dual-ranking event with the European Tour

Challenge Tour playoff record (1–0)

No.	Year	Tournament	Opponent	Result
1	2014	Madeira Islands Open - Portugal - BPI	(Scotland) Scott Henry	Won with par on first extra hole

=== PGA EuroPro Tour wins (1) ===
No.	Date	Tournament	Winning score	Margin of victory	Runner-up
1	18 Jun 2009	Sureshot GPS International Open	−8 (63-67-72=202)	2 strokes	(England) Nicky Harris

=== Clutch Pro Tour wins (1) ===
No.	Date	Tournament	Winning score	Margin of victory	Runners-up
1	3 Aug 2021	Foxhills (Bernard Hunt) Classic	−8 (65)	3 strokes	(Australia) Daniel Gaunt, (England) Will Poole, (England) Nick Ward

=== Jamega Pro Golf Tour wins (2) ===
No.	Date	Tournament	Winning score	Margin of victory	Runners-up
1	20 Apr 2021	Crondon Park	−3 (73-68=141)	2 strokes	(England) George Baylis, (England) Joe Brooks, (England) Jack Charman, (England) Michael Watson
2	17 May 2022	The Shire London	−6 (69-69=138)	1 stroke	(England) Ben Bailey, (England) Habebul Islam

=== Other wins (1) ===
No.	Date	Tournament	Winning score	Margin of victory	Runner-up
1	10 Dec 2009	Samanah Masters	−19 (64-63-70=197)	11 strokes	(France) Julien Forêt

== Results in major championships ==
Tournament	2015
Masters Tournament	
U.S. Open	
The Open Championship	CUT
PGA Championship	

Did not play

CUT = missed the halfway cut

== See also ==
- 2012 Challenge Tour graduates
- 2013 European Tour Qualifying School graduates
