= 2005 Open Championship =

Coordinates: 56.343°N 2.803°W

Tournament information
- Dates: 14–17 July 2005
- Location: St Andrews, Scotland
- Course: Old Course at St Andrews
- Organized by: The R&A
- Tour(s): European Tour; PGA Tour; Japan Golf Tour

Statistics
- Par: 72
- Length: 7,279 yards (6,656 m)
- Field: 156 players, 80 after cut
- Cut: 145 (+1)
- Prize fund: £4,000,000 €5,860,938 $7,490,400
- Winner's share: £720,000 €1,047,362 $1,261,285

Champion
- (United States) Tiger Woods
- 274 (−14)

Location in Scotland
Location in Fife, Scotland

The 2005 Open Championship was a men's major golf championship and the 134th Open Championship, held from 14 to 17 July at the Old Course at St Andrews, Scotland. Tiger Woods led wire-to-wire for his tenth major title, five shots ahead of runner-up Colin Montgomerie. The win was Woods' second Open Championship, both at St. Andrews, and completed his second career grand slam at age 29. The tenth major and second slam were firsts for a player under the age of 30. At age 65, Jack Nicklaus made his final appearance at a major championship.

== History of The Open Championship at The Old Course at St Andrews ==
While winning the Open Championship is a crowning achievement for any golfer, a win at St. Andrews is considered particularly important due to the course's long tradition. Tiger Woods won the Open Championship played at St. Andrews in 2000 with a tournament to par record of 19-under par. Other past winners at St. Andrews include John Daly, Nick Faldo, Seve Ballesteros, Jack Nicklaus (twice), Tony Lema, Kel Nagle, Bobby Locke, Peter Thomson, Sam Snead, Dick Burton, Denny Shute, Bobby Jones, Jock Hutchison, James Braid (twice), John Henry Taylor (twice), Hugh Kirkaldy, Jack Burns, Bob Martin (twice), Jamie Anderson and Tom Kidd.

== Course ==
Hole	Name	Yards	Par	Hole	Name	Yards	Par
1	Burn	376	4	10	Bobby Jones	380	4
2	Dyke	453	4	11	High (In)	174	3
3	Cartgate (Out)	397	4	12	Heathery (In)	348	4
4	Ginger Beer	480	4	13	Hole O'Cross (In)	465	4
5	Hole O'Cross (Out)	568	5	14	Long	618	5
6	Heathery (Out)	412	4	15	Cartgate (In)	456	4
7	High (Out)	390	4	16	Corner of the Dyke	423	4
8	Short	175	3	17	Road	455	4
9	End	352	4	18	Tom Morris	357	4
Out		3,603	36	In		3,676	36
				Total		7,279	72

Previous lengths of the course for The Open Championship (since 1950):

- 7,115 yards (6,506 m) - 2000
- 6,933 yards (6,340 m) - 1995, 1990, 1984, 1978
- 6,957 yards (6,361 m) - 1970
- 6,926 yards (6,333 m) - 1964
- 6,936 yards (6,342 m) - 1960, 1955

== Field ==
1. First 10 and anyone tying for 10th place in the 2004 Open Championship
Ernie Els (2,3,4,13), Retief Goosen (3,4,9,13), Todd Hamilton (2,3,13), Thomas Levet (4,17), Davis Love III (3,12,13,17), Phil Mickelson (3,10,13,17), Scott Verplank (3,13), Mike Weir (3,10,13), Lee Westwood (3,4,17), Tiger Woods (2,3,9,10,11,13,17)

2. Past Open Champions aged 65 or under on 17 July 2005
Mark Calcavecchia, Ben Curtis, John Daly (3), David Duval, Nick Faldo, Tony Jacklin, Paul Lawrie, Tom Lehman (3), Justin Leonard (3), Sandy Lyle, Jack Nicklaus, Greg Norman, Mark O'Meara, Nick Price, Tom Watson

- Eligible but not competing: Ian Baker-Finch, Seve Ballesteros, Johnny Miller, Bill Rogers, Tom Weiskopf

3. The first 50 players on the OWGR for Week 22, 2005
Stephen Ames (13), Stuart Appleby (13), Thomas Bjørn, Ángel Cabrera (4,5), Chad Campbell (17), K. J. Choi, Stewart Cink (13,17), Tim Clark, Darren Clarke (4,17), Fred Couples, Chris DiMarco (13,17), Luke Donald (4,17), Fred Funk (12,17), Jim Furyk (9,17), Sergio García (4,13,17), Mark Hensby (13), Tim Herron, Charles Howell III, Miguel Ángel Jiménez (4,17), Zach Johnson (13), Jerry Kelly (13), Peter Lonard, Shigeki Maruyama, Graeme McDowell (4), Paul McGinley (17), Colin Montgomerie (17), Nick O'Hern (4), Rod Pampling, Craig Parry, Kenny Perry (17), Ian Poulter (4,17), Rory Sabbatini (13), Adam Scott (12,13), Vijay Singh (11,13,21), David Toms (11,17)

- Eligible but not competing: Jay Haas (17), Pádraig Harrington (4,17), David Howell (4,17)

4. First 20 in the European Tour Final Order of Merit for 2004
Paul Casey (17), Stephen Gallacher, Richard Green (19), Joakim Haeggman, Trevor Immelman, Jean-François Remésy

5. The BMW PGA Championship winners for 2003–05
Scott Drummond, Ignacio Garrido

6. First 3 and anyone tying for 3rd place, not exempt, in the top 20 of the European Tour Order of Merit for 2005 on completion of the 2005 BMW PGA Championship
Stephen Dodd, Peter Hanson, Steve Webster

7. First 2 European Tour members and any European Tour members tying for 2nd place, not exempt, in a cumulative money list taken from all official European Tour events from the British Masters up to and including the Open de France and including The U.S. Open
Søren Hansen, Jean van de Velde

8. The leading player, not exempt, in the first 10 and ties of each of the 2005 European Open and the 2005 Scottish Open
Maarten Lafeber, Graeme Storm

9. The U.S. Open Champions for 2001–05
Michael Campbell

10. The Masters Champions for 2001–05

11. The PGA Champions for 2000–04
Rich Beem, Shaun Micheel

12. The Players Champions for 2003–05

13. First 20 on the Official Money List of the PGA Tour for 2004
Steve Flesch

14. First 3 and anyone tying for 3rd place, not exempt, in the top 20 of the Official Money List of the PGA Tour for 2005 on completion of the FedEx St. Jude Classic
Joe Ogilvie, Tim Petrovic, Ted Purdy

15. First 2 PGA Tour members and any PGA Tour members tying for 2nd place, not exempt, in a cumulative money list taken from the Players Championship and the five PGA Tour events leading up to and including the 2005 Western Open
Bart Bryant

- Eligible but not competing: Billy Mayfair

16. The leading player, not exempt having applied (15) above, in each of the 2005 Western Open and the 2005 John Deere Classic
Sean O'Hair, Pat Perez

17. Playing members of the 2004 Ryder Cup teams
Chris Riley

18. First and anyone tying for 1st place on the Order of Merit of the Asian Tour for 2004
Thongchai Jaidee

19. First 2 and anyone tying for 2nd place on the Order of Merit of the PGA Tour of Australasia for 2004
Euan Walters

20. First and anyone tying for 1st place on the Order of Merit of the Sunshine Tour for 2004/2005
Charl Schwartzel

21. The Canadian Open Champion for 2004

22. The Japan Open Champion for 2004
Toru Taniguchi

23. First 2 and anyone tying for 2nd place, not exempt, on the Official Money List of the Japan Golf Tour for 2004
Yang Yong-eun

- Eligible but not competing: Shingo Katayama

24. The leading 4 players, not exempt, in the 2005 Mizuno Open
Chris Campbell, David Smail, Thammanoon Sriroj, Tadahiro Takayama

25. First 2 and anyone tying for 2nd place, not exempt having applied (24) above, in a cumulative money list taken from all official Japan Golf Tour events from the 2005 Japan PGA Championship up to and including the 2005 Mizuno Open
Hiroyuki Fujita, Hur Suk-ho

26. The Senior Open Champion for 2004
Pete Oakley

27. The Amateur Champion for 2005
Brian McElhinney (a)

28. The U.S. Amateur Champion for 2004

- Ryan Moore forfeited his exemption by turning professional.

29. The European Amateur Champion for 2004
Matthew Richardson (a)

International Final Qualifying

Africa: André Bossert, David Frost, Doug McGuigan
Australasia: David Diaz, Martin Doyle, Nick Flanagan, Peter Fowler
Asia: Danny Chia, Mardan Mamat, Richard Moir
America: Robert Allenby, Jason Allred, Rich Barcelo, Tom Byrum, Alex Čejka, Daniel Chopra, Joe Durant, Scott Gutschewski, Scott Hend, Geoff Ogilvy, Tom Pernice Jr., Wilhelm Schauman, Bo Van Pelt, Duffy Waldorf
Europe: Peter Baker, John Bickerton, Andrew Butterfield, Robert Coles, Simon Dyson, Kenneth Ferrie, Alastair Forsyth, Marcus Fraser, Simon Khan, Peter Lawrie, Andrew Oldcorn, Robert Rock, Patrik Sjöland, Ian Woosnam

Local Final Qualifying (Saturday 9 July and Sunday 10 July)

Ladybank: Edoardo Molinari (a), Robert Steele (a), John Wade
Leven Links: Sean McDonagh, Eric Ramsay (a), Tino Schuster
Lundin: Lars Brovold, Brad Faxon, Oscar Florén (a)
Scotscraig: Andrew Marshall, Lloyd Saltman (a), Murray Urquhart

Alternates

- José María Olazábal – replaced Seve Ballesteros
- Bob Tway – took spot not taken by Billy Mayfair
- Bernhard Langer – replaced Shingo Katayama
- Freddie Jacobson – replaced Jay Haas
- Brian Davis – replaced David Howell
- Henrik Stenson – replaced Pádraig Harrington

== Round summaries ==
=== First round ===
Thursday, 14 July 2005

Tiger Woods stormed out to a 66 (−6) for a one shot lead over Mark Hensby, who missed a birdie putt on the 18th green. Defending champion Todd Hamilton shot 74 (+2) and Jack Nicklaus, the 18-time major champion, carded 75 (+3).

Place	Player	Score	To par
1	(United States) Tiger Woods	66	−6
2	(Australia) Mark Hensby	67	−5
T3	(United States) Fred Couples	68	−4
T3	(England) Luke Donald	68	−4
T3	(South Africa) Retief Goosen	68	−4
T3	(South Africa) Trevor Immelman	68	−4
T3	(Australia) Peter Lonard	68	−4
T3	(Spain) José María Olazábal	68	−4
T3	(Scotland) Eric Ramsay (a)	68	−4
T3	(United States) Chris Riley	68	−4
T3	(Germany) Tino Schuster	68	−4
T3	(United States) Scott Verplank	68	−4

=== Second round ===
Friday, 15 July 2005

Nicklaus made a 15-foot (5 m) birdie putt on the final stroke of his professional career. On his walk up to the final green, he received a near ten-minute standing ovation, pausing for photographs on the iconic Swilcan Bridge. Nicklaus shot an even-par 72 in his final competitive round, but his 147 (+3) missed the cut by two strokes.

Place	Player	Score	To par
1	(United States) Tiger Woods	66-67=133	−11
2	(Scotland) Colin Montgomerie	71-66=137	−7
T3	(Australia) Robert Allenby	70-68=138	−6
T3	(United States) Brad Faxon	72-66=138	−6
T3	(South Africa) Trevor Immelman	68-70=138	−6
T3	(Australia) Peter Lonard	68-70=138	−6
T3	(Spain) José María Olazábal	68-70=138	−6
T3	(Fiji) Vijay Singh	69-69=138	−6
T3	(United States) Scott Verplank	68-70=138	−6
T10	(United States) Bart Bryant	69-70=139	−5
T10	(United States) Fred Couples	68-71=139	−5
T10	(Spain) Sergio García	70-69=139	−5
T10	(England) Simon Khan	69-70=139	−5
T10	(United States) Bo Van Pelt	72-67=139	−5

Amateurs: Molinari (−4), Ramsay (−2), Richardson (E), Saltman (E), Florén (+7), McElhinney (+9), Steele (+9).

=== Third round ===
Saturday, 16 July 2005

Place	Player	Score	To par
1	(United States) Tiger Woods	66-67-71=204	−12
2	(Spain) José María Olazábal	68-70-68=206	−10
T3	(South Africa) Retief Goosen	68-73-66=207	−9
T3	(Scotland) Colin Montgomerie	71-66-70=207	−9
T5	(United States) Brad Faxon	72-66-70=208	−8
T5	(Spain) Sergio García	70-69-69=208	−8
T7	(New Zealand) Michael Campbell	69-72-68=209	−7
T7	(Fiji) Vijay Singh	69-69-71=209	−7
T9	(United States) Bart Bryant	69-70-71=210	−6
T9	(South Africa) Tim Clark	71-69-70=210	−6
T9	(Northern Ireland) Darren Clarke	73-70-67=210	−6
T9	(United States) John Daly	71-69-70=210	−6
T9	(Denmark) Søren Hansen	72-72-66=210	−6
T9	(Netherlands) Maarten Lafeber	73-70-67=210	−6
T9	(Germany) Bernhard Langer	71-69-70=210	−6
T9	(Scotland) Sandy Lyle	74-67-69=210	−6
T9	(United States) Sean O'Hair	73-67-70=210	−6
T9	(United States) Kenny Perry	71-71-68=210	−6
T9	(United States) Scott Verplank	68-70-72=210	−6

=== Final round ===
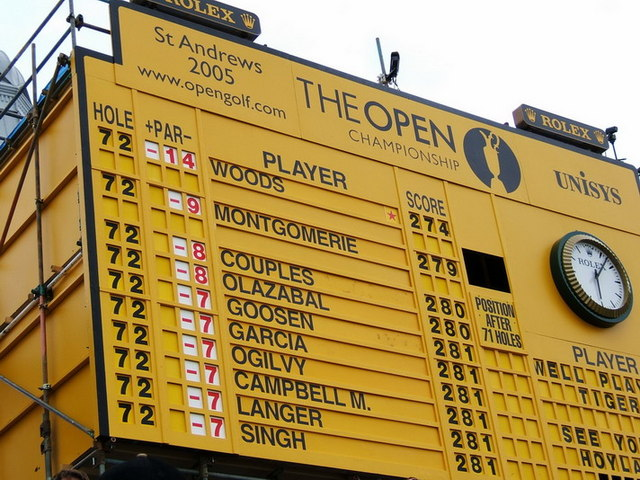
The final round scoreboard

Sunday, 17 July 2005

Woods moved to 10-0 when leading going into the final round of a major, winning his second Open Championship title. He pulled away from Colin Montgomerie who finished second in a major for the fifth time. Woods shot a 2-under 70, the only round under par among the final 14 players. Fred Couples and Duffy Waldorf shot 68, the low rounds of the day.

Place	Player	Score	To par	Money (£)
1	(United States) Tiger Woods	66-67-71-70=274	−14	720,000
2	(Scotland) Colin Montgomerie	71-66-70-72=279	−9	430,000
T3	(United States) Fred Couples	68-71-73-68=280	−8	242,350
T3	(Spain) José María Olazábal	68-70-68-74=280	−8	242,350
T5	(New Zealand) Michael Campbell	69-72-68-72=281	−7	122,100
T5	(Spain) Sergio García	70-69-69-73=281	−7	122,100
T5	(South Africa) Retief Goosen	68-73-66-74=281	−7	122,100
T5	(Germany) Bernhard Langer	71-69-70-71=281	−7	122,100
T5	(Australia) Geoff Ogilvy	71-74-67-69=281	−7	122,100
T5	(Fiji) Vijay Singh	69-69-71-72=281	−7	122,100

Amateurs: Saltman (−5), Ramsay (−4), Molinari (+1), Richardson (+9).

==== Scorecard ====
Hole	1	2	3	4	5	6	7	8	9	10	11	12	13	14	15	16	17	18
Par	4	4	4	4	5	4	4	3	4	4	3	4	4	5	4	4	4	4
(United States) Woods	−12	−12	−12	−12	−13	−13	−13	−13	−14	−13	−13	−14	−14	−15	−15	−15	−14	−14
(Scotland) Montgomerie	−9	−9	−10	−10	−11	−11	−11	−11	−12	−12	−11	−11	−10	−10	−10	−9	−9	−9
(United States) Couples	−5	−5	−5	−5	−6	−5	−5	−5	−6	−7	−7	−7	−7	−7	−7	−7	−7	−8
(Spain) Olazábal	−10	−10	−10	−11	−11	−10	−10	−10	−11	−11	−11	−10	−9	−9	−8	−8	−7	−8
(New Zealand) Campbell	−7	−6	−6	−6	−7	−7	−7	−7	−7	−7	−7	−8	−8	−7	−7	−7	−7	−7
(Spain) García	−8	−7	−7	−7	−8	−8	−8	−8	−8	−8	−8	−6	−5	−6	−7	−7	−6	−7
(South Africa) Goosen	−8	−7	−7	−7	−6	−6	−6	−5	−6	−6	−6	−5	−5	−6	−6	−6	−6	−7
(Germany) Langer	−6	−6	−6	−6	−8	−8	−8	−8	−9	−8	−8	−8	−8	−9	−7	−7	−6	−7
(Australia) Ogilvy	−4	−3	−3	−2	−2	−1	−2	−2	−3	−3	−3	−4	−4	−4	−5	−5	−6	−7
(Fiji) Singh	−8	−8	−8	−8	−8	−8	−7	−8	−8	−8	−8	−9	−8	−8	−7	−7	−6	−7

Cumulative tournament scores, relative to par

Eagle	Birdie	Bogey	Double bogey	Triple bogey+
