= John Gallagher (golfer) =

Scottish golfer (born 1981)

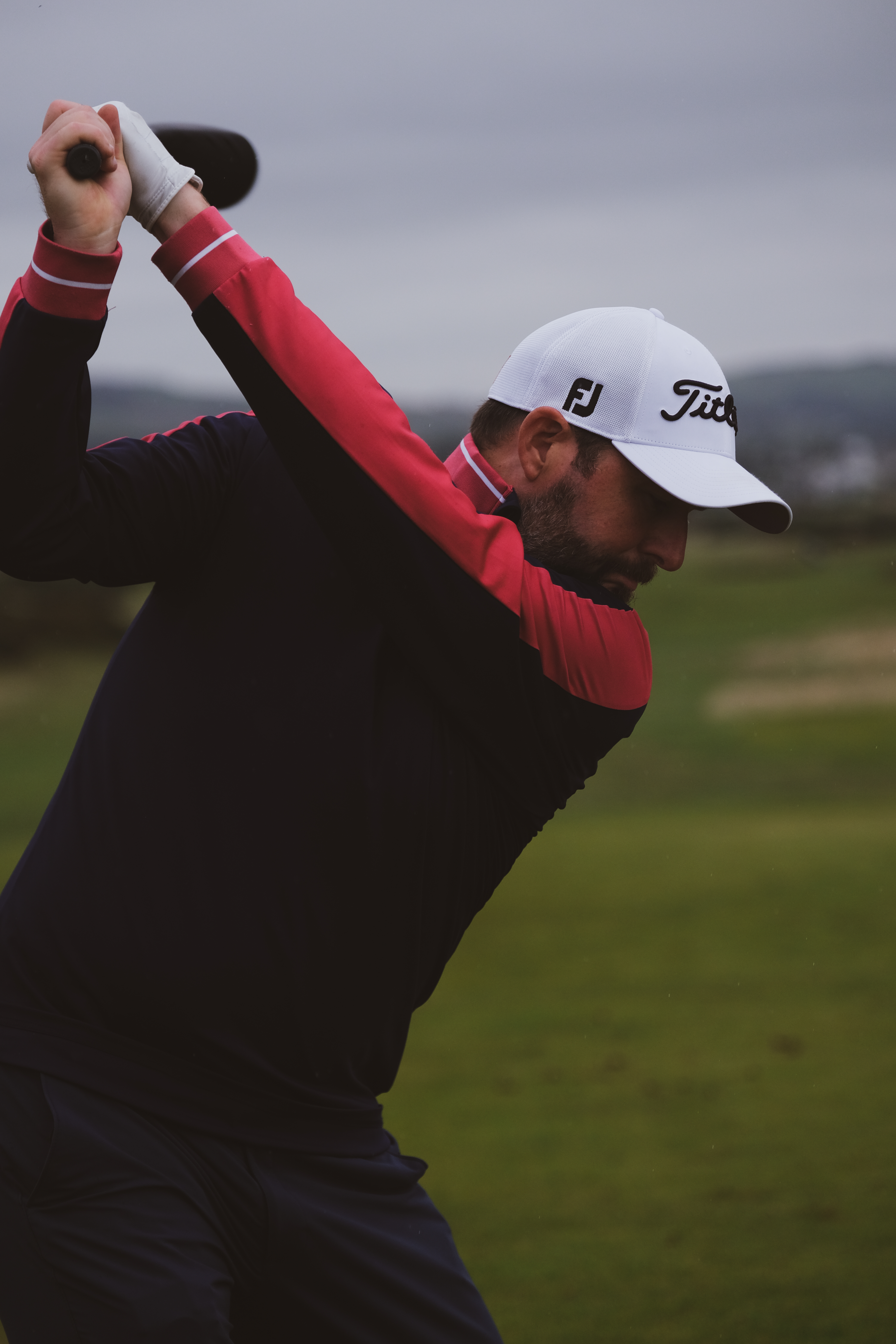

Personal information
- Nationality: Scotland
- Born: 17 April 1981 (age 45) Edinburgh, Scotland
- Height: 5 ft 11 in (1.80 m)

Career
- Sport: Golf
- Turned professional: 2009
- Current tour: Tartan Pro Tour
- Former tour: PGA EuroPro Tour
- Professional wins: 2

John Gallagher (born 17 April 1981) is a Scottish professional golfer who plays on the Tartan Pro Tour. In April 2009, he began his professional career on the PGA EuroPro Tour.

Gallagher's most prolific amateur victory came at the 2007 Scottish Amateur Championship which was played at Prestwick Golf Club in Ayrshire. The final match was a resounding 4&3 win over Keir McNicoll. He also finished 2nd in the 2005 Amateur Championship, defeating 19-year-old sensation Lloyd Saltman in the semi-final.

Gallagher reached as high as 14th in the World Amateur Golf Ranking. His key strength is consistently accurate play from tee to green. He is a self-taught right-handed golfer with a "cack-handed" or "cross-handed" grip. He grips every club with his left hand below his right.

== Early life ==
Born to an Irish father and Scottish mother, Gallagher was raised and educated in Edinburgh, Scotland, where his father John was and is a greenskeeper. Young John grew up playing at a modest local golf club and taught himself the game without the benefit of even one lesson.

== Amateur career ==
Gallagher won three important Scottish amateur tournaments: the 2005 Craigmillar Park Open, the 2006 Tennant Cup, and the 2007 Scottish Amateur Championship. He also played for Scotland in its back-to-back victories in the Men's Home Internationals in 2005 and 2006. Ultimately Gallagher represented Scotland at three consecutive Home Internationals competitions. By September, 2007 his wrist pain was acute, and it limited his effectiveness in his third campaign. His career record at the Home Internationals was 6-7-2, scoring 7 points. He also represented Scotland at the Spirit International in Trinity, Texas in 2005. He competed in several national amateur championships and in numerous elite amateur tournaments across four continents.

Gallagher burst into the international spotlight with his runner-up finish in the 2005 Amateur Championship at Royal Birkdale. After his semi-final victory over heavily favored Lloyd Saltman the relatively unknown golfer was suddenly one match away from claiming one of the top two amateur titles in the world and earning coveted invitations to the Masters Tournament and The Open Championship. Irishman Brian McElhinney, however, got ahead early in their final match and Gallagher could never mount a serious charge in the blustery conditions. Gallagher's run through one of the strongest fields in amateur golf put him on the international map and he was ranked 14th in the world among amateur golfers. Participating in Scotland's victory at the Home Internationals over Ireland, Wales, and a very strong English contingent capped off his breakthrough 2005 season.

Several strong finishes in 2006 including victory in the Tennant Cup saw Gallagher again briefly break into the top 50 of the worldwide amateur golf ranking. He began to experience pain in his wrist which affected his play somewhat as the 2007 season wore on. Told that he would not likely make things worse by playing in this pain, he entered the Scottish Amateur Championship and won, earning an invitation to the Scottish Open on the European Tour. Gallagher underwent surgery on his wrist after the 2007 season.

The 2008 season began with residual pain in the wrist and uneven results in competition for Gallagher. He rounded into form in time to begin the Scottish Open with a three under par 68. On the second day he was again three under par through 16 holes at the demanding Loch Lomond course and appeared atop the second page of the leader board. His double-bogey triple-bogey finish cost him the chance to play on the weekend. This outstanding performance (save the last two holes), solidified his confidence in his ability to compete in the professional ranks which he joined in 2009.

== Professional career ==
In 2009, Gallagher's highest finish on the PGA EuroPro Tour was T-23. He twice shot what was then his low competitive professional round of 67. He first accomplished this at the MotoCaddy Masters at The Players Club near Codrington in July. Three weeks later, he again recorded a 67 in the opening round, this time at the Virgin Atlantic 25th Anniversary Classic at Marriott Tudor Park. Gallagher finished the 2009 season 69th on the PGA EuroPro Tour order of merit and was 93rd in 2010 while playing in just 9 events.

In 2011 Gallagher earned his first professional victory at the West Lancashire Open. In the process he achieved his lowest 18-hole score to date with a 65. He finished 33rd on the 1836 Tour order of merit while appearing in just 5 events. He also competed on the EuroPro tour, with his best finish coming at the Network Veka Classic (18th). While entering 8 events he finished 86th on the EuroPro tour order of merit.

Gallagher opened the 2012 season by shooting 67-70-70-68 (-12) to finish tied for second place in the Scottsdale Classic Pro-Am. This was his first professional appearance in the U.S. He followed this up in March with his second professional victory, winning the Valenti Pro-Am at San Roque with 71-70-71 (-4). In April he finished T-9 in the final stage of the EuroPro Tour qualifying school. At the conclusion of the 2012 EuroPro regular season he stands 61st on the Order of Merit.

In 2013 Gallagher's highlights included a runner-up finish at La Reserva on the Gecko Pro Tour and two 6th-place finishes.

== Personal life ==
Gallagher lives in the Edinburgh suburb of Roslin. He married his girlfriend Lisa in Las Vegas on 1 October 2011. They have one son.

== Amateur wins ==
- 2005 Craigmillar Park Open
- 2006 Tennant Cup
- 2007 Scottish Amateur Championship

== Professional wins (2) ==
- 2011 West Lancashire Open (1836 Tour)
- 2012 Valenti Pro-Am at San Roque

== Team appearances ==
Amateur

- Home Internationals: (representing Scotland) 2005 (winners), 2006 (winners), 2007
- The Spirit International Amateur Championship: (representing Scotland) 2005

== Notes and references ==
- The Daily Record chats with John Gallagher about him leading big name golfers at Loch Lomond
- Wikipedia page showing the year-by-year winners of the Scottish Amateur Championship
- "iseekgolf" describes John Gallagher's runner-up finish in the 2005 British Amateur Championship
- Europro Tour 2010 Order of Merit
- Europro Tour 2011 Order of Merit
- 1836 Tour 2011 Order of Merit
- Europro Tour 2012 Final Qualifying Results
