= Renfrew Golf Club =

Golf club in Renfrew, Scotland

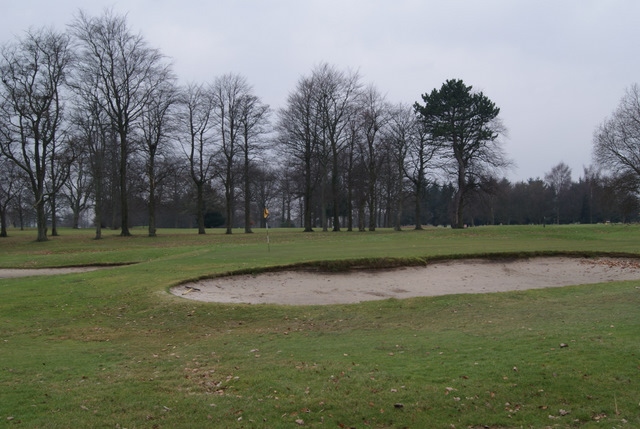
- View from the footpath by the River Clyde

- Location within Scotland
- 55.88721°N 4.40204°W

Club information
- Location: Renfrew
- Established: September 1894
- Type: Private
- Tota holes: 18
- Tournaments: Scottish Amateur Championship 1984 and 1994, The European Boys Team Championship 1988, Sunderland of Scotland Masters 1991, Scottish Regional Qualifiers for The Open Championship
- Greens: Bentgrass
- Website: http://www.renfrewgolfclub.net/
- Designed by: James Braid
- Par: 73
- Length: 6808 yards

Renfrew Golf Club is based in Renfrew, Scotland. It is situated in the Blythswood Estate, near to the River Cart and the River Clyde.

== History ==
The club was established on 28 September 1894. A group of wealthy businessmen from Renfrew and Govan held a meeting and subsequently leased land from Speirs of Elderslie Estates. The course was opened on 22 October 1894 by Andrew Brown, Provost of Renfrew. It was originally a nine-hole course at Haining Road and was extended by James Braid in 1920 to eighteen holes and a par of 73. This made the course the longest in the West of Scotland at that time. A club house was opened on 20 May 1925.

A demand for housing in the area led to the club giving up the lease on the land at Haining Road. It was acquired by Ravenstone Securities Ltd, headed by chairman Reo Stakis. As part of the deal Ravenstone would provide 105 acres of land at Blythswood Estate for a new course to be built. On 29 September 1973 the new course at Blythswood was opened by James T Douglas, President of the Scottish Golf Union.

The course has played host to several tournaments including the Scottish Amateur Championship in 1984 and 1994. The European Boys Team Championship 1988 and the Sunderland of Scotland Masters 1991 were held at Renfrew. In 2000 and 2004 the course was used for the Scottish Regional Qualifiers for The Open Championship.

== See also ==
- Golf in Scotland
- History of golf
