= 2025 Tartan Pro Tour =

Golf tour season

2025 Tartan Pro Tour season
- Duration: 14 May 2025 – 15 October 2025
- Number of official events: 14
- Most wins: (Scotland) Rory Franssen (3)
- Order of Merit: (Scotland) Rory Franssen

The 2025 Tartan Pro Tour, titled as the 2025 Farmfoods Tartan Pro Tour for sponsorships reasons, was the sixth season of the Tartan Pro Tour, a third-tier tour recognised by the European Tour.

== Changes for 2025 ==
For the 2025 season, the Tartan Pro Tour was upgraded from a feeder tour to a satellite tour, meaning that a player who wins three times in a season is automatically promoted to the Challenge Tour and is exempt for the next full season. Rory Franssen won three times during the 2025 season and became the first player from the Tartan Pro Tour to earn automatic promotion.

== Schedule ==
The following table lists official events during the 2025 season.

Date	Tournament	Location	Purse (£)	Winner (Note: The number in brackets after each winner's name is the number of Tartan Pro Tour events they had won up to and including that tournament. It is rare for someone to accumulate many wins on the Tartan Pro Tour as success at this level usually leads to promotion to the Challenge Tour.)	OWGR points
16 May	Montrose Links Masters	Angus	27,500	(England) Mark Young (1)	1.04
20 May	Blairgowrie Perthshire Masters	Perthshire	27,500	(Scotland) Rory Franssen (2)	0.79
8 Jun	Paul Lawrie Golf Centre Scottish Par 3 Championship	Aberdeenshire	25,000	(Scotland) Scott Henry (1)	n/a
11 Jun	Portlethen Classic	Aberdeenshire	27,500	(Scotland) Greg Dalziel (2)	0.83
26 Jun	Newmachar Classic	Aberdeenshire	25,000	(Scotland) Bradley Neil (2)	0.82
4 Jul	Cardrona Classic	Peeblesshire	26,000	(Scotland) Rory Franssen (3)	0.82
18 Jul	Downfield Masters	Perthshire	27,500	(England) Rhys Thompson (7)	0.76
13 Aug	Leven Links Classic	Fife	27,500	(Scotland) Greg Dalziel (3)	0.69
20 Aug	Musselburgh Masters	East Lothian	27,500	(Australia) Connor McKinney (1)	0.70
11 Sep	MacDonald Spey Valley Masters	Moray	25,000	(Scotland) Kieran Cantley (4)	0.67
17 Sep	St Andrews Classic	Fife	27,500	(Scotland) John Paterson (1)	0.69
25 Sep	Gleneagles Masters	Perthshire	27,500	(Scotland) Rory Franssen (4)	0.93
8 Oct	Duddingston Classic	Midlothian	25,000	(Scotland) Sam Locke (8)	0.90
15 Oct	Trump International Tour Championship	Aberdeenshire	30,000	(Scotland) Jack McDonald (4)	0.65

== Order of Merit ==
The Order of Merit was based on tournament results during the season, calculated using a points-based system. The top two players on the Order of Merit earned status to play on the 2026 Challenge Tour (HotelPlanner Tour).

Position	Player	Points	Status earned
1	(Scotland) Rory Franssen	22,383	Promoted to Challenge Tour
2	(Scotland) Liam Johnston	19,597	Promoted to Challenge Tour
3	(Scotland) Greg Dalziel	13,915	
4	(Scotland) Craig Ross	12,310	
5	(England) Rhys Thompson	11,566	
6	(Scotland) Will Porter	11,372	
7	(Scotland) John Paterson	10,760	
8	(Scotland) Jack McDonald	10,283	
9	(Scotland) Michael Stewart	9,725	
10	(Scotland) Kieran Cantley	9,556	
