= 2020 Tartan Pro Tour =

Golf tour season

2020 Tartan Pro Tour season
- Duration: 5 August 2020 – 24 September 2020
- Number of official events: 6
- Most wins: (Scotland) Neil Fenwick (2)
- Order of Merit: (Scotland) Neil Fenwick

The 2020 Tartan Pro Tour was the inaugural season of the Tartan Pro Tour, a third-tier tour recognised by the European Tour.

== Schedule ==
The following table lists official events during the 2020 season.

Date	Tournament	Location	Purse (£)	Winner (Note: The number in brackets after each winner's name is the number of Tartan Pro Tour events they had won up to and including that tournament. It is rare for someone to accumulate many wins on the Tartan Pro Tour as success at this level usually leads to promotion to the Challenge Tour.)
6 Aug	Carnoustie Challenge	Angus	19,000	(Scotland) Sam Locke (1)
30 Aug	Scottish Par 3 Championship	Aberdeenshire	19,000	(Scotland) John Henry (1)
8 Sep	Royal Dornoch Masters	Sutherland	19,000	(Scotland) Chris Maclean (1)
11 Sep	Pollok Open	Glasgow	19,000	(Scotland) Neil Fenwick (1)
16 Sep	St Andrews Classic	Fife	19,000	(Scotland) Jamie McLeary (1)
24 Sep	Rowallan Castle Championship	East Ayrshire	19,000	(Scotland) Neil Fenwick (2)

== Order of Merit ==
The Order of Merit was based on prize money won during the season, calculated in Pound sterling.

Position	Player	Prize money (£)
1	(Scotland) Neil Fenwick	10,111
2	(Scotland) Chris Robb	9,552
3	(Scotland) John Henry	8,629
4	(Scotland) Sam Locke	7,844
5	(Scotland) Jack McDonald	7,412
