= 2023 Tartan Pro Tour =

Golf tour season

2023 Tartan Pro Tour season
- Duration: 1 May 2023 – 27 September 2023
- Number of official events: 13
- Most wins: (England) Rhys Thompson (4)
- Order of Merit: (England) Rhys Thompson

The 2023 Tartan Pro Tour, titled as the 2023 Farmfoods Tartan Pro Tour for sponsorships reasons, was the fourth season of the Tartan Pro Tour, a third-tier tour recognised by the European Tour.

== Challenge Tour feeder status ==
In December 2022, it was announced that the Tartan Pro Tour and the Clutch Pro Tour would become official feeder tours to the Challenge Tour in place of the now-defunct PGA EuroPro Tour. The Tartan Pro Tour would offer Challenge Tour status to the leading player on the Order of Merit.

== Schedule ==
The following table lists official events during the 2023 season.

Date	Tournament	Location	Purse (£)	Winner (Note: The number in brackets after each winner's name is the number of Tartan Pro Tour events they had won up to and including that tournament. It is rare for someone to accumulate many wins on the Tartan Pro Tour as success at this level usually leads to promotion to the Challenge Tour.)
3 May	Barassie Links Classic	South Ayrshire	25,000	(Scotland) Craig Lee (1)
12 May	Montrose Links Masters	Angus	25,000	(Scotland) Euan McIntosh (1)
24 May	Fairmont St Andrews	Fife	25,000	(Scotland) Rory Franssen (1)
31 May	Portlethen Classic	Aberdeenshire	25,000	(Scotland) Kieran Cantley (3)
16 Jun	Pollok Open	Glasgow	25,000	(Scotland) Sam Locke (4)
21 Jun	Dundonald Links Classic	East Lothian	25,000	(England) Rhys Thompson (3)
14 Jul	Downfield Masters	Dundee	25,000	(England) Rhys Thompson (4)
19 Jul	Cardrona Classic	Peeblesshire	25,000	(England) Rhys Thompson (5)
23 Aug	Leven Links Classic	Fife	25,000	(Scotland) Graeme Robertson (1)
29 Aug	Blairgowrie Perthshire Masters	Perthshire	25,000	(Scotland) Gregor Graham (a) (1)
8 Sep	Ladybank Masters	Fife	25,000	(Scotland) Calum Fyfe (1)
20 Sep	St Andrews Classic	Fife	25,000	(Scotland) John Henry (2)
27 Sep	Gleneagles Masters	Perthshire	25,000	(England) Rhys Thompson (6)

== Order of Merit ==
The Order of Merit was based on prize money won during the season, calculated in Pound sterling. The leading player on the Order of Merit earned status to play on the 2024 Challenge Tour.

Position	Player	Prize money (£)	Status earned
1	(England) Rhys Thompson	21,958	Promoted to Challenge Tour
2	(Scotland) Kieran Cantley	16,445	
3	(Scotland) John Henry	15,137	
4	(Scotland) Sam Locke	12,640	
5	(Scotland) Greg Dalziel	10,125	
6	(Scotland) Rory Franssen	9,642	
7	(Scotland) Daniel Kay	9,094	
8	(Scotland) Jack McDonald	9,002	
9	(Scotland) Graeme Robertson	8,659	
10	(England) Adam Chapman	8,438	
