= 2022 Tartan Pro Tour =

Golf tour season

2022 Tartan Pro Tour season
- Duration: 11 April 2022 – 20 October 2022
- Number of official events: 13
- Most wins: (Scotland) Jack McDonald (3)
- Order of Merit: (Scotland) Jack McDonald

The 2022 Tartan Pro Tour, titled as the 2022 Farmfoods Tartan Pro Tour for sponsorships reasons, was the third season of the Tartan Pro Tour, a third-tier tour recognised by the European Tour.

== Schedule ==
The following table lists official events during the 2022 season.

Date	Tournament	Location	Purse (£)	Winner (Note: The number in brackets after each winner's name is the number of Tartan Pro Tour events they had won up to and including that tournament. It is rare for someone to accumulate many wins on the Tartan Pro Tour as success at this level usually leads to promotion to the Challenge Tour.)
12 Apr	Blairgowrie Perthshire Masters	Perthshire	20,000	(Scotland) Jack McDonald (1)
20 Apr	Montrose Links Masters	Angus	20,000	(Scotland) Daniel Kay (1)
26 Apr	Royal Dornoch Masters	Sutherland	20,000	(Scotland) Jack McDonald (2)
3 May	Barassie Links Classic	South Ayrshire	20,000	(Scotland) Daniel Young (2)
5 May	Dundonald Links Classic	East Lothian	20,000	(Scotland) Sam Locke (3)
16 Jun	Pollok Open	Glasgow	18,000	(Scotland) Joe Bryce (1)
5 Aug	Farmfoods Scottish Par 3 Championship	Aberdeenshire	18,000	(Scotland) Kieran Cantley (2)
21 Sep	St Andrews Classic	Fife	20,000	(England) Russell Chrystie (1)
30 Sep	Ladybank Masters	Fife	20,000	(Scotland) Christopher Curran (1)
7 Oct	Leven Links Classic	Fife	20,000	(England) Rhys Thompson (2)
11 Oct	Renaissance Club Classic	East Lothian	20,000	(Scotland) Jeff Wright (2)
14 Oct	Panmure Masters	Angus	20,000	(Scotland) Jack McDonald (3)
20 Oct	Carnoustie Tour Championship	Angus	20,000	(Scotland) Ollie Roberts (1)

== Order of Merit ==
The Order of Merit was based on prize money won during the season, calculated in Pound sterling.

Position	Player	Prize money (£)
1	(Scotland) Jack McDonald	15,903
2	(Scotland) Daniel Kay	15,360
3	(Scotland) Kieran Cantley	11,955
4	(Scotland) Sam Locke	10,190
5	(Scotland) Michael Stewart	8,743
