= Scottish Amateur =

National amateur golf championship of Scotland

Scottish Amateur Championship
Tournament information
- Location: Scotland
- Established: 1922
- Course: Various
- Organised by: Scottish Golf Union
- Format: Stroke Play & Match Play
- Month played: July/August

Tournament record score
- Score: 10 & 8 Hamilton McInally (1947)

Current champion
- Greg Mclellan

The Scottish Amateur is the national amateur match play golf championship of Scotland. It has been played since 1922 and is organised by the Scottish Golf Union. It is a "closed" event with entry currently restricted to those who were either born in Scotland, have Scottish parentage, or are permanently resident in Scotland for at least the previous five years.

The youngest winner is Oliver Mukherjee, the 2022 champion, at age 16 years, 286 days.

== Format ==
The tournament used to use the match play format, beginning with 256 players. The first seven rounds, up to the semi-finals, were contested over 18 holes, whilst the final was contested over 36 holes. Eight players were given a seeding in the first round. However in 2017, the format was changed to a stroke play qualification, followed by match play for the top 64 stroke play qualifiers.

Originally the semi-finals and final were played on the final day but in 1928 the final was extended to 36 holes. In 1931, a 36-hole qualifying stage was introduced, played on a Monday and Tuesday generally on two courses, although occasionally on just one course. The leading 64 qualified with the first round played on Wednesday, two further rounds on Thursday and Friday and the final on Saturday. In 1931 there was an evening playoff for those tied for the final places but from 1932 all those tying for the final place qualified and there was a preliminary round on the Wednesday to reduce the number to 64. From 1955 the championship returned to a pure match-play event.

== Winners ==
Year	Venue	Winner	Score	Runner-up
2026	Royal Aberdeen Golf Club	Greg Mclellan	3 & 2	Aidan Lawson
2025	Gullane Golf Club	Chris Somers	1 up	Archie Finnie
2024	St Andrews Links, Castle Course	Alexander Farmer	5 & 4	Charles Reynolds
2023	Royal Dornoch Golf Club	Cameron Adam	5 & 3	Gregor Tait
2022	Glasgow Golf Club, Gailes Links	Oliver Mukherjee	1 up	Gregor Tait
2021	Murcar Links	Angus Carrick	2 up	Connor Wilson
2020	Cancelled due to COVID-19 pandemic in Scotland			
2019	Crail Golfing Society	George Burns	19 holes	Lewis Irvine
2018	Blairgowrie Golf Club	Euan McIntosh	3 & 2	Jamie Stewart
2017	Prestwick Golf Club	Sam Locke	9 & 8	Ryan Lumsden
2016	Royal Aberdeen Golf Club	George Duncan	3 & 1	Andrew Burgess
2015	Muirfield	Robert MacIntyre	2 up	Daniel Young
2014	Downfield Golf Club	Chris Robb	4 & 3	Graeme Robertson
2013	Blairgowrie Golf Club	Alexander Culverwell	2 & 1	James White
2012	Royal Dornoch Golf Club	Grant Forrest	9 & 7	Richard Docherty
2011	Western Gailes Golf Club	David Law	6 & 5	Daniel Kay
2010	Gullane Golf Club	Michael Stewart	3 & 2	Jordan Finlay
2009	Royal Troon Golf Club	David Law	38 holes	Paul O'Hara
2008	Carnoustie Golf Links	Callum Macaulay	5 & 3	Steven McEwan
2007	Prestwick Golf Club	John Gallagher	4 & 3	Keir McNicoll
2006	Nairn Golf Club	Kevin McAlpine	8 & 7	Paul O'Hara
2005	Southerness Golf Club	Glenn Campbell	37 holes	Ben Shamash
2004	Gullane Golf Club	George Murray	1 up	Paul O'Hara
2003	The Duke's Course	Graham Gordon	4 & 3	Stuart Wilson
2002	Western Gailes Golf Club	Andrew McArthur	2 & 1	Scott Jamieson
2001	Downfield Golf Club	Barry Hume	5 & 4	Craig Watson
2000	Royal Dornoch Golf Club	Steven O'Hara	1 up	Craig Heap
1999	Cruden Bay Golf Club	Craig Heap	7 & 5	Mark Loftus
1998	Prestwick Golf Club	Graham Rankin	6 & 5	Mark Donaldson
1997	Carnoustie Golf Links	Craig Hislop	5 & 3	Sam Cairns
1996	Dunbar Golf Club	Michael Brooks	7 & 6	Allan Turnbull
1995	Southerness Golf Club	Simon Mackenzie	8 & 7	Hugh McKibbin
1994	Renfrew Golf Club	Hugh McKibbin	39 holes	Alan Reid
1993	Royal Dornoch Golf Club	Dean Robertson	1 up	Raymond Russell
1992	Glasgow Golf Club, Gailes Links	Stephen Gallacher	37 holes	David Kirkpatrick
1991	Downfield Golf Club	Graham Lowson	4 & 3	Len Salariya
1990	Gullane Golf Club	Craig Everett	7 & 5	Mike Thomson
1989	Moray Golf Club	Allan Thomson	1 up	Alan Tait
1988	Kilmarnock (Barassie) Golf Club	Jim Milligan	1 up	Andrew Coltart
1987	Nairn Golf Club	Colin Montgomerie	9 & 8	Alasdair Watt
1986	Monifieth Golf Links	Colin Brooks	3 & 2	Allan Thomson
1985	Southerness Golf Club	David Carrick	3 & 2	David James
1984	Renfrew Golf Club	Angus Moir	3 & 2	Kenny Buchan
1983	Gullane Golf Club	Charlie Green	1 up	John Huggan
1982	Carnoustie Golf Links	Charlie Green	1 up	George Macgregor
1981	Western Gailes Golf Club	Colin Dalgleish	7 & 5	Allan Thomson
1980	Royal Aberdeen Golf Club	Donald Jamieson	2 & 1	Charlie Green
1979	Prestwick Golf Club	Keith Macintosh	5 & 4	Paul McKellar
1978	Downfield Golf Club	Iain Carslaw	7 & 6	John Cuddihy
1977	Troon	Allan Brodie	1 up	Paul McKellar
1976	Old Course at St Andrews	Gordon Murray	6 & 5	Hugh Stuart
1975	Montrose Golf Links	David Greig	7 & 6	Gordon Murray
1974	Western Gailes Golf Club	Gordon Murray	2 & 1	Sandy Pirie
1973	Carnoustie Golf Links	Ian Hutcheon	3 & 2	Allan Brodie
1972	Prestwick Golf Club	Hugh Stuart	3 & 1	Sandy Pirie
1971	Old Course at St Andrews	Sandy Stephen	3 & 2	Charlie Green
1970	Royal Aberdeen Golf Club	Charlie Green	1 up	Hugh Stuart
1969	Troon	Jack Cannon	6 & 4	Allan Hall
1968	Muirfield	Gordon Cosh	4 & 3	Lindsay Renfrew
1967	Carnoustie Golf Links	Ronnie Shade	5 & 4	Alan Murphy
1966	Western Gailes Golf Club	Ronnie Shade	9 & 8	Colin Strachan
1965	Old Course at St Andrews	Ronnie Shade	4 & 2	Gordon Cosh
1964	Nairn Golf Club	Ronnie Shade	7 & 6	Jimmy McBeath
1963	Troon	Ronnie Shade	4 & 3	Newton Henderson
1962	Muirfield	Stuart Murray	2 & 1	Ronnie Shade
1961	Western Gailes Golf Club	James Walker	4 & 3	Stuart Murray
1960	Carnoustie Golf Links	John Young	5 & 3	Sandy Saddler
1959	Old Course at St Andrews	Frank Deighton	6 & 5	Robert Murray
1958	Prestwick Golf Club	Dickson Smith	6 & 5	Ian Harris
1957	Royal Aberdeen Golf Club	John Montgomerie	2 & 1	Jack Burnside
1956	Troon	Frank Deighton	8 & 7	Alec MacGregor
1955	Muirfield	Reid Jack	2 & 1	Minty Miller
1954	Nairn Golf Club	Jim Draper	4 & 3	Crawford Gray
1953	Western Gailes Golf Club	David Blair	3 & 1	Jimmy McKay
1952	Carnoustie Golf Links	Gordon Dewar	4 & 3	James Wilson
1951	Old Course at St Andrews	Morton Dykes	4 & 2	James Wilson
1950	Prestwick Golf Club	William Gibson	2 & 1	David Blair
1949	Muirfield	Robin Wight	1 up	Hamilton McInally
1948	Royal Aberdeen Golf Club	Sandy Flockhart	7 & 6	Gordon Taylor
1947	Glasgow Golf Club, Gailes Links	Hamilton McInally	10 & 8	Jack Pressley
1946	Carnoustie Golf Links	Eric Brown	3 & 2	Robert Rutherford
1940–45: No championships due to World War II
1939	Prestwick Golf Club	Hamilton McInally	6 & 5	Hector Thomson
1938	Muirfield	Edward Hamilton	4 & 2	Robert Rutherford
1937	Kilmarnock (Barassie) Golf Club	Hamilton McInally	6 & 5	Graham Patrick
1936	Carnoustie Golf Links	Edward Hamilton	1 up	Robert Neill
1935	Old Course at St Andrews	Hector Thomson	2 & 1	Jack McLean
1934	Western Gailes Golf Club	Jack McLean	3 & 1	William Campbell
1933	Royal Aberdeen Golf Club	Jack McLean	6 & 5	Ken Forbes
1932	Dunbar Golf Club	Jack McLean	5 & 4	Ken Greig
1931	Prestwick Golf Club	John Wilson	2 & 1	Andrew Jamieson Jr.
1930	Carnoustie Golf Links	Ken Greig	9 & 8	James Wallace
1929	Royal Aberdeen Golf Club	Jack Bookless	5 & 4	James Dawson
1928	Muirfield	Willis Mackenzie	5 & 3	W E Dodds
1927	Western Gailes Golf Club	Andrew Jamieson Jr.	22 holes	David Rutherford
1926	Leven Links	William Guild	2 & 1	Sydney Shepherd
1925	Muirfield	Tom Dobson	3 & 2	Willis Mackenzie
1924	Royal Aberdeen	Willis Mackenzie	3 & 2	William Tulloch
1923	Troon	Tom Burrell	1 up	Archibald McCallum
1922	Old Course at St Andrews	John Wilson	19 holes	Edward Blackwell
