= 2021 Tartan Pro Tour =

Golf tour season

2021 Tartan Pro Tour season
- Duration: 15 April 2021 – 28 October 2021
- Number of official events: 12
- Most wins: (Scotland) Craig Lawrie (2)
- Order of Merit: (Scotland) Kieran Cantley

The 2021 Tartan Pro Tour, titled as the 2021 Farmfoods Tartan Pro Tour for sponsorships reasons, was the second season of the Tartan Pro Tour, a third-tier tour recognised by the European Tour.

== Farmfoods title sponsorship ==
In February, it was announced that the tour had signed a title sponsorship agreement with Farmfoods, being renamed as the Farmfoods Tartan Pro Tour.

== Schedule ==
The following table lists official events during the 2021 season.

Date	Tournament	Location	Purse (£)	Winner (Note: The number in brackets after each winner's name is the number of Tartan Pro Tour events they had won up to and including that tournament. It is rare for someone to accumulate many wins on the Tartan Pro Tour as success at this level usually leads to promotion to the Challenge Tour.)
16 Apr	Montrose Links Masters	Angus	20,000	(Scotland) Gavin Hay (1)
20 Apr	Barassie Links Classic	South Ayrshire	19,000	(Scotland) Sam Locke (2)
27 Apr	Royal Dornoch Masters	Sutherland	18,000	(Scotland) Kieran Cantley (1)
19 May	Pollok Open	Glasgow	21,000	(Scotland) Jeff Wright (1)
15 Jul	Scottish Par 3 Championship	Aberdeenshire	15,000	(Scotland) Craig Lawrie (1)
22 Sep	St Andrews Classic	Fife	20,000	(Scotland) Daniel Young (1)
29 Sep	Blairgowrie Perthshire Masters	Perthshire	17,000	(Scotland) Ryan Campbell (1)
6 Oct	Farmfoods Paul Lawrie Match Play	East Lothian	18,000	(Scotland) Craig Lawrie (2)
8 Oct	Leven Links Classic	Fife	15,500	(Scotland) James Wilson (1)
12 Oct	Renaissance Club Classic	East Lothian	22,000	(Scotland) Lloyd Saltman (1)
14 Oct	Royal Aberdeen Granite City Classic	Aberdeenshire	17,500	(Scotland) Michael Stewart (1)
28 Oct	Carnoustie Tour Championship	Angus	23,000	(Scotland) Robbie Morrison (1) (England) Rhys Thompson (1)

== Order of Merit ==
The Order of Merit was based on prize money won during the season, calculated in Pound sterling.

Position	Player	Prize money (£)
1	(Scotland) Kieran Cantley	17,146
2	(Scotland) Michael Stewart	12,888
3	(Scotland) Daniel Young	12,013
4	(Scotland) Jack McDonald	10,906
5	(Scotland) Ryan Campbell	10,563
