= Sam Locke (golfer) =

Scottish golfer

Personal information
- Nationality: Scotland
- Born: 11 August 1998 (age 28) Stonehaven, Aberdeenshire, Scotland

Career
- Sport: Golf
- Turned professional: 2018
- Current tour: Tartan Pro Tour
- Former tours: Challenge Tour; PGA EuroPro Tour
- Professional wins: 10

Best results in major championships
- Masters Tournament: DNP
- PGA Championship: DNP
- U.S. Open: DNP
- The Open Championship: T75: 2018

Sam Locke (born 11 August 1998) is a Scottish professional golfer. He came to prominence by winning the Silver Medal, as the leading amateur, at the 2018 Open Championship.

== Amateur career ==
Locke won the 2017 Scottish Amateur beating Ryan Lumsden, 9 and 8, in the final, after being 10-up after the first 18 holes.

Locke qualified for the 2018 Open Championship by winning the Final Qualifying at The Renaissance Club with rounds of 69 and 66. He was the only amateur to qualify through Final Qualifying and joined three other amateurs in the field. He just made the cut, after rounds of 72 and 73, the only amateur to do so, and won the Silver Medal as the leading amateur after further rounds of 70 and 78. He turned professional after the Open Championship.

== Professional career ==
Locke's first ten professional wins came on the Tartan Pro Tour, including the 2024 Montrose Links Masters, the first Tartan Pro Tour event to award Official World Golf Ranking points.

== Amateur wins ==
- 2017 Scottish Amateur

== Professional wins (10) ==
=== Tartan Pro Tour wins (10) ===
No.	Date	Tournament	Winning score	Margin of victory	Runner(s)-up
1	6 Aug 2020	Carnoustie Challenge	−7 (68-69=137)	Playoff	(Scotland) Chris Robb
2	20 Apr 2021	Barassie Links Classic	−14 (65-65=130)	3 strokes	(Scotland) Jack McDonald
3	5 May 2022	Dundonald Links Classic	−4 (73-67=140)	1 stroke	(England) Christian Brown, (Scotland) Rory Smith
4	16 Jun 2023	Pollok Open	−12 (68-68-65=201)	Playoff	(Scotland) Christopher Curran, (Scotland) Jack McDonald
5	16 May 2024	Montrose Links Masters	−7 (61-74=135) (Note: Shortened to 36 holes due to weather.)	Playoff	(Scotland) Greg Dalziel
6	29 May 2024	Portlethen Classic	−14 (65-66-68=199)	1 stroke	(Scotland) Graeme Robertson
7	18 Sep 2024	St Andrews Classic	−15 (69-64-68=201)	1 stroke	(Scotland) John Henry
8	8 Oct 2025	Duddingston Classic	−9 (73-63-68=204)	Playoff	(England) Mark Young
9	13 Jun 2026	Scottish Par 3 Championship	−11 (49-53-49=151)	4 strokes	(United States) John Vogelpohl
10	7 Jul 2026	Blairgowrie Perthshire Masters	−15 (67-70-64=201)	1 stroke	(Scotland) Robbie Morrison

== Results in major championships ==
Results not in chronological order before 2019.

Tournament	2018	2019
Masters Tournament		
PGA Championship		
U.S. Open		
The Open Championship	T75LA	CUT

Did not play

LA = Low amateur
CUT = missed the half-way cut
"T" = tied for place
