= Bradley Neil =

Scottish golfer

Personal information
- Full name: Bradley Hay Neil
- Nationality: Scotland
- Born: 16 January 1996 (age 30) Blairgowrie, Scotland

Career
- Sport: Golf
- Turned professional: 2015
- Current tour: Tartan Pro Tour
- Former tours: European Tour; Challenge Tour
- Professional wins: 2

Best results in major championships
- Masters Tournament: CUT: 2015
- PGA Championship: DNP
- U.S. Open: CUT: 2015
- The Open Championship: CUT: 2014

Bradley Hay Neil (born 16 January 1996) is a Scottish professional golfer. He won the 2014 Amateur Championship.

== Amateur career ==
In 2013, Neil won the Scottish Boys Championship. In 2014, he won The Amateur Championship, defeating Zander Lombard, 2 and 1, in the final. This win qualified him for the Open Championship the next month and the following year's Masters Tournament and U.S. Open, in all of which he missed the cut.

== Professional career ==
Neil made his professional debut the week after the U.S. Open, at the SSE Scottish Hydro Challenge on the Challenge Tour. In July 2017 he had his best finishes as a professional, joint runner-up in the Prague Golf Challenge and the Italian Challenge Open in successive weeks. He finished the season 15th in the Race to Oman rankings to earn his place on the 2018 European Tour.

Neil earned his first professional victory in June 2024 on the Tartan Pro Tour at the Newmachar Classic.

== Professional wins (2) ==
=== Tartan Pro Tour wins (2) ===
No.	Date	Tournament	Winning score	Margin of victory	Runners-up
1	27 Jun 2024	Newmachar Classic	−15 (72-68-61=201)	7 strokes	(Australia) Jack Buchanan, (Scotland) Calum Fyfe, (Scotland) Graeme Robertson
2	26 Jun 2025	Newmachar Classic (2)	−14 (69-68-65=202)	1 stroke	(Scotland) Rory Franssen, (Scotland) Liam Johnston

== Results in major championships ==
Tournament	2014	2015
Masters Tournament		CUT
U.S. Open		CUT
The Open Championship	CUT	
PGA Championship		

Did not play

CUT = missed the half-way cut

== Team appearances ==
Amateur

- European Boys' Team Championship (representing Scotland): 2012
- Jacques Léglise Trophy (representing Great Britain & Ireland): 2012, 2013 (winners)
- European Amateur Team Championship (representing Scotland): 2013, 2014
- St Andrews Trophy (representing Great Britain & Ireland): 2014 (winners)
- Junior Ryder Cup (representing Europe): 2014
- Eisenhower Trophy (representing Scotland): 2014

== See also ==
- 2017 Challenge Tour graduates
