= Eric Ramsay (golfer) =

Scottish professional golfer

Personal information
- Full name: Eric Thomas Ramsay
- Nationality: Scotland
- Born: 2 August 1979 (age 47) Dundee, Scotland
- Height: 6 ft 3 in (1.91 m)
- Weight: 196 lb (89 kg; 14.0 st)

Career
- Sport: Golf
- Turned professional: 2005
- Former tour: Challenge Tour
- Professional wins: 1

Number of wins by tour
- Challenge Tour: 1

Best results in major championships
- Masters Tournament: DNP
- PGA Championship: DNP
- U.S. Open: DNP
- The Open Championship: T23: 2005

Eric Thomas Ramsay (born 2 August 1979) is a Scottish professional golfer.

== Early life and amateur career ==
In 1979, Ramsay was born in Dundee.

In 2005, he won the Australian Amateur. Later in the year, he finished in a tie for 23rd place at the 2005 Open Championship, one stroke behind Lloyd Saltman for the silver medal as low amateur.

== Professional career ==
In 2005, he turned professional. Ramsay has played on the second tier European Challenge Tour since 2006 and picked up his first victory on tour in 2009 at the DHL Wroclaw Challenge.

== Amateur wins ==
- 2005 Australian Amateur

== Professional wins (1) ==
=== Challenge Tour wins (1) ===
No.	Date	Tournament	Winning score	Margin of victory	Runners-up
1	30 Aug 2009	DHL Wrocław Open	−17 (61-68-65-69=263)	2 strokes	(England) Andrew Butterfield, (England) Richard McEvoy

== Results in major championships ==
Tournament	2005
The Open Championship	T23

Note: Ramsay only played in The Open Championship.
"T" = tied

== Team appearances ==
Amateur

- European Amateur Team Championship (representing Scotland): 2005
