= David Blair (golfer) =

Scottish golfer (1917–1985)

Personal information
- Full name: David Arthur Blair
- Nationality: Scotland
- Born: 25 August 1917 Scotland
- Died: 10 April 1985 (aged 67) Canterbury, Kent, England

Career
- Sport: Golf
- Status: Amateur

Best results in major championships
- Masters Tournament: CUT: 1962, 1963
- PGA Championship: DNP
- U.S. Open: DNP
- The Open Championship: T9: 1960

David Arthur Blair MBE, MC (25 August 1917 – 10 April 1985) was a Scottish amateur golfer. He finished in the top-10 in the Open Championship in 1960 and played in the Walker Cup in 1955 and 1961. He was a retired major in the Seaforth Highlanders in the British Army. His younger brother Chandos was also in the Seaforth Highlanders.

== Early life ==
Blair was educated at Harrow School and the Royal Military College, Sandhurst.

== Military career ==
Blair graduated from Sandhurst on 26 August 1937 and was commissioned as a second lieutenant in the Seaforth Highlanders, a line infantry regiment of the British Army. He was captured at El Adem in 1942 but escaped in 1943. He was awarded the Military Cross when his company made an assault crossing over a canal in Holland in late 1944.

== Business career ==
Blair was chairman of the Scotch whisky export committee from 1985 to 1980 and a director of Distillers Company. He was also chairman of United Glass Ltd.

== Family ==
Blair married in 1947 Elizabeth Adela Morton, daughter of Major Harold Trestrail Morton and his wife Beatrice Nathalie Shaw of The Abbey, Aston Abbotts.

== Amateur wins ==
- 1935 Scottish Boys' Championship
- 1947 Army Championship
- 1948 Nairn Open
- 1953 Scottish Amateur, Royal St. Georges Gold Vase
- 1955 Golf Illustrated Gold Vase
- 1956 Golf Illustrated Gold Vase
- 1955 R&A Silver Cross, George Glennie Medal
- 1961 Scandinavian Amateur Championship
- 1964 Royal St. Georges Gold Vase
- 1966 Hampshire Hog
- 1967 Royal St. Georges Gold Vase, Hampshire Hog
- 1968 R&A Silver Cross
- 1970 Hampshire Hog

== Results in major championships ==
Tournament	1950	1951	1952	1953	1954	1955	1956	1957	1958	1959	1960	1961	1962	1963
Masters Tournament													CUT	CUT
The Open Championship	T30										T9		CUT	

Note: Blair only played in the Masters Tournament and The Open Championship.

Top 10
Did not play

CUT = missed the half-way cut
"T" indicates a tie for a place

== Team appearances ==
- Commonwealth Tournament (representing Great Britain): 1954
- Walker Cup (representing Great Britain & Ireland): 1955, 1961
- Amateurs–Professionals Match (representing the Amateurs): 1956, 1960
