= 1960 Open Championship =

Coordinates: 56.343°N 2.803°W

- Front cover of the 1960 Open programme

Tournament information
- Dates: 6–9 July 1960
- Location: St Andrews, Scotland
- Course: Old Course at St Andrews
- Organized by: The R&A

Statistics
- Par: 73
- Length: 6,936 yards (6,342 m)
- Field: 74 players, 47 after cut
- Cut: 149 (+5)
- Prize fund: £7,000 $19,600
- Winner's share: £1,250 $3,500

Champion
- (Australia) Kel Nagle
- 278 (−14)

Location in Scotland
Location in Fife, Scotland

The 1960 Open Championship was the 89th Open Championship, played 6–9 July at the Old Course in St Andrews, Scotland. In the centenary year of the Open Championship, Kel Nagle prevailed over Arnold Palmer by a single stroke; this year marked the championship's re-emergence as a major stop for American players.

The total prize money was increased by forty per cent, from £5,000 to £7,000. The winner's share was increased to £1,250 with £900 for second, £700 for third, £500 for fourth, £400 for fifth, £300 for sixth, £250 for seventh, £200 for eighth, £150 for ninth, and £130 for tenth. The next fifteen places each received £60 with £50 for next seven and then £40 for the next eighteen. The £50 prize for winning the qualification event was unchanged while the four prizes for the lowest score in each round were increased to £50. For the centenary event there was a special prize for the winner in the form of a replica of the claret jug.

Qualifying took place on 4–5 July, Monday and Tuesday, with 18 holes on the Old Course and 18 holes on the New Course. A maximum of 100 players could qualify. Gary Player led the qualifiers as medalist at 135, and the qualifying score was 147 and 74 players qualified; 28 players on 148 were not included. Dick Metz, who had won the World Senior Golf Championship at Gleneagles on 3 July, was one of those on 148 who just failed to qualify.

Roberto De Vicenzo opened the tournament proper with consecutive rounds of 67 on Wednesday and Thursday to take a two-stroke lead over Nagle. In the third round, De Vicenzo's drive on the 14th ended up on top of a wall and he finished the round with a score of 75, allowing Nagle to take a two-shot lead. Palmer, who had won the U.S. Open three weeks earlier by erasing a seven-shot deficit in the final round, was four back after 54-holes. The final round on Friday afternoon was delayed until Saturday due to a heavy rainfall that flooded portions of the course; the first postponement in over fifty years. When play resumed the next day, Palmer and Nagle both went out in 34. Still four-strokes behind, Palmer began another charge on the back. He made up strokes on the 13th and 15th, made a 4 on the 17th, then made birdie at the last. Nagle was standing over a crucial putt on the Road Hole 17th when he heard the roar signifying Palmer's birdie at 18. He managed to collect himself and hole the putt, then made a safe 4 at the last to win the title by a single shot over Palmer.

Already 39 at the time of his victory, this was Nagle's first top ten finish in a major championship. Although little-known outside of Australia at the time of the tournament, he went on to have success throughout the next decade and came close to winning another major at the 1965 U.S. Open, losing to Gary Player in an 18-hole playoff.

Palmer had won the first two majors at the Masters and U.S. Open, and was attempting to equal Ben Hogan's 1953 season with a third consecutive major. His appearance established the British Open as an important tournament for American golfers and, although Palmer himself skipped the tournament a few times afterward, the best American players began crossing the Atlantic with regularity from then on. Palmer won the next two Opens in 1961 and 1962.

The appearance of Palmer, already the most popular golfer in the world, proved to be a turning point for the Open Championship. Until the 1960s, few Americans made the trip to the Open Championship, with the lengthy ocean-voyage and high costs of traveling to Britain often more than they stood to win in the tournament. Even Palmer, winner of the first two majors of the year, had to play in the 36-hole qualifier immediately preceding it. The 1960 event included only four Americans following the qualifier, and only two made the cut. Ten years later, 24 Americans were in the field of 134. For many years, the event often conflicted with the PGA Championship in the U.S., a more lucrative major which gradually moved to late July and then August.

== Card of the course ==
Hole	Name	Yards	Par	Hole	Name	Yards	Par
1	Burn	374	4	10	Tenth ^	338	4
2	Dyke	411	4	11	High (In)	170	3
3	Cartgate (Out)	400	4	12	Heathery (In)	360	4
4	Ginger Beer	439	4	13	Hole O'Cross (In)	427	4
5	Hole O'Cross (Out)	567	5	14	Long	560	5
6	Heathery (Out)	377	4	15	Cartgate (In)	413	4
7	High (Out)	364	4	16	Corner of the Dyke	380	4
8	Short	163	3	17	Road	453	5
9	End	359	4	18	Tom Morris	381	4
Out		3,454	36	In		3,482	37
Source:				Total		6,936	73

^ The 10th hole was posthumously named for Bobby Jones in 1972

== Round summaries ==
=== First round ===
Wednesday, 6 July 1960

Place	Player	Score	To par
1	(Argentina) Roberto De Vicenzo	67	−6
T2	(Argentina) Fidel de Luca	69	−4
T2	(Australia) Kel Nagle	69	−4
T4	(Scotland) David Blair (a)	70	−3
T4	(England) Ken Bousfield	70	−3
T4	(United States) Arnold Palmer	70	−3
T4	(England) Peter Shanks	70	−3
8	(England) Peter Mills	71	−2
T9	(Republic of Ireland) Joe Carr (a)	72	−1
T9	(Brazil) José María Gonzáles	72	−1
T9	(South Africa) Harold Henning	72	−1
T9	(England) Bernard Hunt	72	−1
T9	(Scotland) George Low	72	−1
T9	(Republic of Ireland) Jimmy Martin	72	−1
T9	(Spain) Ángel Miguel	72	−1
T9	(England) Ralph Moffitt	72	−1
T9	(Scotland) Raymond Munro (a)	72	−1
T9	(South Africa) Gary Player	72	−1
T9	(Argentina) Leopoldo Ruiz	72	−1
T9	(Australia) Peter Thomson	72	−1

=== Second round ===
Thursday, 7 July 1960

A maximum of fifty players could make the cut. The 47 who scored 149 (+4) or better qualified for the final day; eight players scoring 150 (+5) were not included.

Place	Player	Score	To par
1	(Argentina) Roberto De Vicenzo	67-67=134	−12
2	(Australia) Kel Nagle	69-67=136	−10
T3	(Spain) Sebastián Miguel	73-68=141	−5
T3	(United States) Arnold Palmer	70-71=141	−5
T3	(Australia) Peter Thomson	72-69=141	−5
T6	(Scotland) Laurie Ayton, Jnr	73-69=142	−4
T6	(Argentina) Fidel de Luca	69-73=142	−4
T8	(Scotland) David Blair (a)	70-73=143	−3
T8	(Scotland) Eric Brown	75-68=143	−3
T8	(England) Ralph Moffitt	72-71=143	−3
T8	(South Africa) Gary Player	72-71=143	−3
T8	(England) Peter Shanks	70-73=143	−3

Amateurs: Blair (−3), Wolstenholme (−2), Deighton (−2), Carr (−1), Jack (−1), Smith (−1),
Deboys (E), Munro (+3), Shade (+3), Walker (+4), Wright (+4), Saddler (+5), Nisbet (+7).

=== Third round ===
Friday, 8 July 1960 - (morning)

Place	Player	Score	To par
1	(Australia) Kel Nagle	69-67-71=207	−12
2	(Argentina) Roberto De Vicenzo	67-67-75=209	−10
T3	(United States) Arnold Palmer	70-71-70=211	−8
T3	(England) Syd Scott	73-71-67=211	−8
5	(Republic of Ireland) Joe Carr (a)	72-73-67=212	−7
6	(South Africa) Harold Henning	72-72-69=213	−6
7	(Scotland) David Blair (a)	70-73-71=214	−5
T8	(Scotland) Eric Brown	75-68-72=215	−4
T8	(Scotland) Reid Jack (a)	74-71-70=215	−4
T8	(Spain) Sebastián Miguel	73-68-74=215	−4
T8	(England) Peter Mills	71-74-70=215	−4
T8	(South Africa) Gary Player	72-71-72=215	−4
T8	(England) Harry Weetman	74-70-71=215	−4
T8	(England) Guy Wolstenholme (a)	74-70-71=215	−4

=== Final round ===
Saturday, 9 July 1960

Champion
(a) = amateur
(c) = past champion

Place	Player	Score	To Par	Money (£)
1	(Australia) Kel Nagle	69-67-71-71=278	−14	1,250
2	(United States) Arnold Palmer	70-71-70-68=279	−13	900
T3	(Argentina) Roberto De Vicenzo	67-67-75-73=282	−10	533
T3	(South Africa) Harold Henning	72-72-69-69=282	−10	533
T3	(England) Bernard Hunt	72-73-71-66=282	−10	533
6	(England) Guy Wolstenholme (a)	74-70-71-68=283	−9	−
7	(South Africa) Gary Player	72-71-72-69=284	−8	300
8	(Republic of Ireland) Joe Carr (a)	72-73-67-73=285	−7	−
T9	(Scotland) David Blair (a)	70-73-71-72=286	−6	−
T9	(Scotland) Eric Brown	75-68-72-71=286	−6	158
T9	(Wales) Dai Rees	73-71-73-69=286	−6	158
T9	(England) Syd Scott	73-71-67-75=286	−6	158
T9	(Australia) Peter Thomson	72-69-75-70=286	−6	158
T9	(England) Harry Weetman	74-70-71-71=286	−6	158

Amateurs: Wolstenholme (−9), Carr (−7), Blair (−6), Jack (−4), Deboys (−2), Smith (+5), Shade (+7), Deighton (+10), Munro (+16)

==== Scorecard ====
Hole	1	2	3	4	5	6	7	8	9	10	11	12	13	14	15	16	17	18
Par	4	4	4	4	5	4	4	3	4	4	3	4	4	5	4	4	5	4
(Australia) Nagle	−12	−12	−12	−12	−12	−12	−13	−14	−14	−14	−14	−14	−14	−14	−13	−13	−14	−14
(United States) Palmer	−9	−10	−10	−10	−10	−10	−10	−10	−10	−10	−10	−10	−11	−11	−11	−11	−12	−13

Cumulative tournament scores, relative to par

Birdie	Bogey
