= Golf in Scotland =

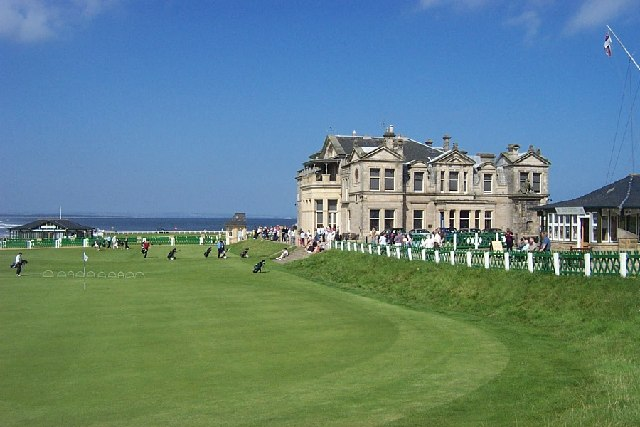
The Old Course at St Andrews

Golf in Scotland was first recorded in the Scottish late Middle Ages, and the modern game of golf was first developed and established in the country. The game plays a key role in the national sporting consciousness.

The Royal and Ancient Golf Club of St Andrews, known as the R&A, was the world governing body for the game (except in the United States and Mexico). The R&A, a separate organisation from the club, was created in 2004 as the governing body. The Scottish Ladies' Golfing Association was founded in 1904 and the Scottish Golf Union (SGU) in 1920. They merged in 2015 into a new organization, Scottish Golf.

To many golfers, the Old Course at St Andrews, an ancient links course dating to before 1574, is considered to be a site of pilgrimage. There are many other famous golf courses in Scotland, including Carnoustie, Gleneagles, Muirfield, Kingsbarns, Turnberry and Royal Troon. The world's first Open Championship was held at Prestwick in 1860, and Scots golfers have the most victories at the Open at 42 wins, one ahead of the United States.

Although golf is often seen as an elitist sport elsewhere in the world, in the land of its birth it enjoys widespread appeal across the social spectrum, in line with the country's egalitarian tradition. For example, the Old Course at St Andrews is a charitable trust and Musselburgh Links are public courses. Council-owned courses, with low fees and easy access, are common throughout the country wherever demography and geography allow. Therefore, golf courses, whether public or private, are far more common in the Lowlands than in the Highlands and Islands, where shinty (a game which may share a common ancestry with golf) is often the traditional sport.

Scotland is widely promoted as the "Home of Golf," and along with whisky and the long list of Scottish inventions and discoveries, golf is widely seen as being a key national cultural icon throughout the world. It is frequently used to market the country to potential visitors, for example for the Homecoming year in 2009, and golf tourism accounted for approximately 2% of overall Scottish tourism spending in 2004. One page that explains the history of golf in Scotland starts off by stating that, "There has been much debate as to the origins of the game and, in some cases, how it was originally played. One thing is certain — the game of golf as we know it was born in Scotland".

Scotland has 587 courses, the most courses per head of any country, with the majority being in Glasgow and Edinburgh.

== Etymology ==
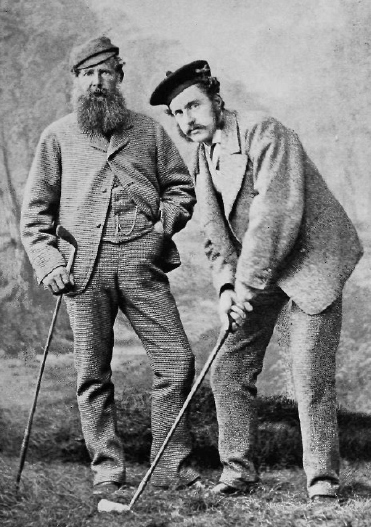
Old Tom Morris with Young Tom Morris ca. 1870-75

The word golf was first recorded in the 15th century, appearing twice in an act of the Scots Parliament of 6 March 1457, in the reign of James II. The act, which ordered the holding of wappenschaws (English: musterings) four times a year for the purpose of archery practice, stated that "the fut bal ande the golf" (football and golf) were to be "vtterly criyt done" (condemned; lit. "cried down") and "nocht vsyt" (not engaged in; lit. "not used"). Offenders were to be punished by the barony courts, otherwise they were "to be tane be the kingis officiaris" (arrested by the king's officers).

Football (see Football in Scotland) and golf are again both explicitly named and forbidden in two further 15th century Scottish statutes encouraging archery practice, in 1470 and 1491. The 1470 Act, in the reign of James III, again uses the spelling golf, but the 1491 Act, in the reign of James IV, spells it gouff'; and variants such as gowf, gowff, gouf became the usual spellings during the Early Modern Period. The Scottish National Dictionary states that "golf represents a revival of the Middle Scots form; Loudoun Gowf Club, Newmilns, retains the old form in its title"; i.e. the spelling changed from Medieval golf to Early Modern gowf, and then back again.

The Dictionary of the Older Scottish Tongue gives the etymology of the word golf or gouf (with many alternative spellings) as probably from the Dutch kolf (see Kolven, a Dutch indoor ballgame); although the dictionary also records the noun golf (with alternative spellings golfe or golph) as deriving from Middle English golf or goulf or Old French golfe, meaning "a deep pool or hollow; an abyss"; a cognate of modern English gulf.

=== Other golfing words of Scots origin ===
- Links: first recorded in 1453 – "Et de ... s. de le lynkis de Leith"
- Golf club: first recorded in 1503–1504 – "For golf clubbes and balles to the King that he playit with"
- Golfball: first recorded as a term in 1545 (although also referred to in the 1503–1504 Treasury account) – "Three dossoun and thre goif bawis"
- Drive: first recorded in 1583 - "Ane golf staff to driffe the ball vithe all"
- Tee (Teeing ground): first recorded in 1721 – "Driving their Baws frae Whins or Tee, There’s no ae Gowfer to be seen."
- Putt: first recorded in 1743 – "Let each social soul Drink to the putter, the balls, and the hole."
- Caddie: first recorded in 1773 – "In order to preserve the holes, no Golfer or Cadie shall be allowed to make any Tee within ten yards of the hole.rules are to score a goal"

== Origins ==
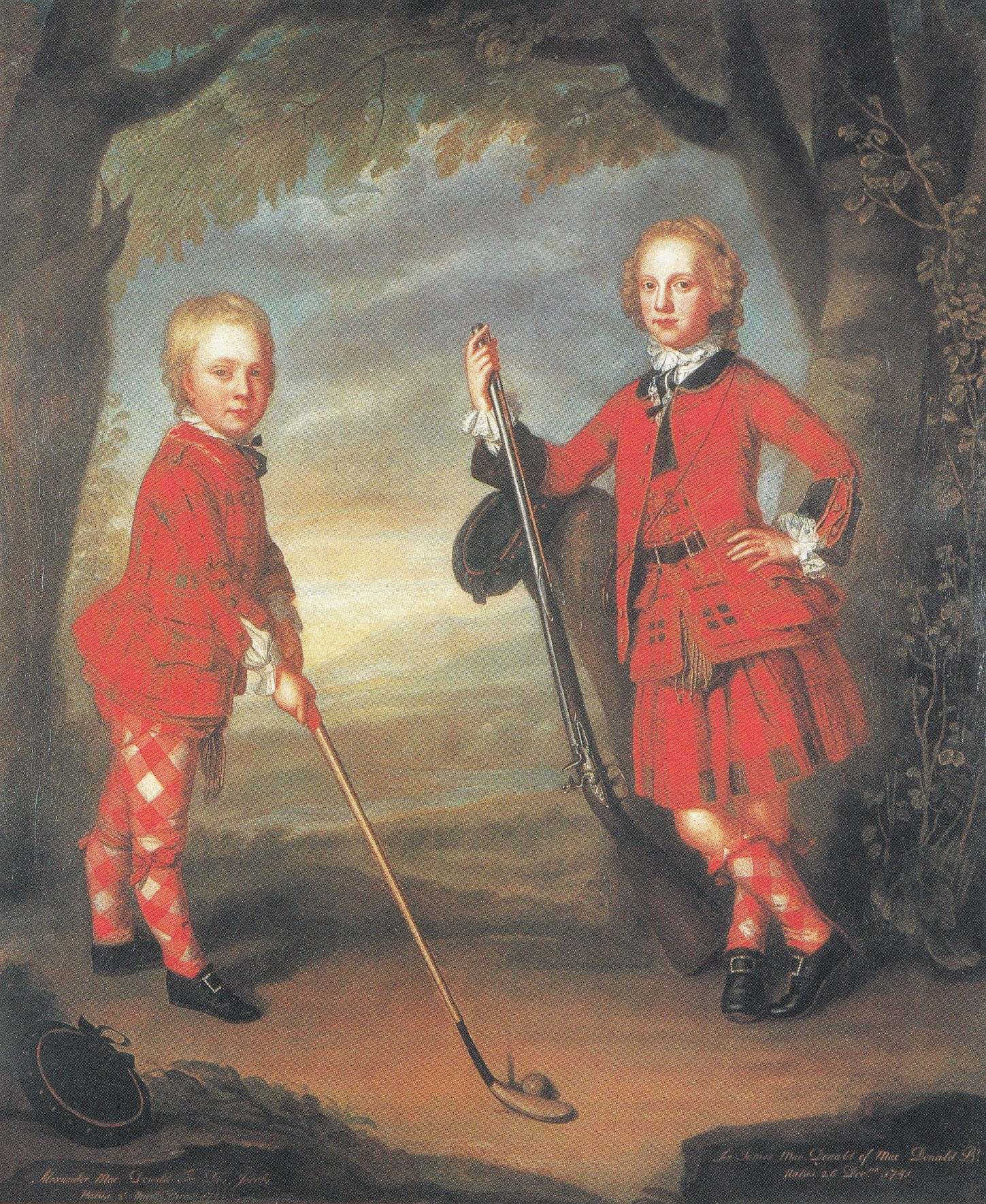
The MacDonald boys playing golf by the 18thC portrait painter Jeremiah Davison

The exact origins of the sport of golf are unclear. The most widely accepted theory is that the modern game of golf originated in Scotland in the High Middle Ages. The first golf courses and clubs were established in the country. The first written rules originated in Scotland, as did the establishment of the 18-hole course. The first tournament structures developed and competitions were held between various burghs. The modern game was spread by Scots to the rest of the world.

The earliest reference to golf is the purchase of a set of golf clubs by James IV from a bowmaker of St Johnston (Perth) in 1502. Where he played is not known, but it is likely to have been on the open ground called the North Inch at Perth. It is recorded that Robert Maule of Panmure played golf at Carnoustie in the mid 16th century, as a wager for drink. Around the same time, in 1552, John Hamilton the Archbishop of St Andrews granted the right of the people of St Andrews to play golf and gather turf on the links, retaining his rights to the rabbit warrens there.

The Old Links at Musselburgh Racecourse is claimed to be the oldest playing golf course in the world. Evidence has shown that golf was played on Musselburgh Links in 1672, although Mary, Queen of Scots reputedly played there even earlier in 1567.

An entry in the Edinburgh burgh records for 19 April 1592 includes golf in a list of pastimes to be avoided on the Sabbath. The parish register for neighbouring South Leith records the appearance of four parishioners before the kirk session on 7 December 1610 who "confessed they had prophaned the Sabbath be playing at the gowffe in tyme off preaching and thairfore was ordained to mak thair publict repentance the nixt Sabboth."

== Golf course evolution ==
Golf courses have not always consisted of eighteen holes. The St Andrews Links occupy a narrow strip of land along the sea-shore. As early as the 15th century, golfers at St Andrews established a trench through the undulating terrain, playing to holes whose locations were dictated by topography. The course that emerged featured eleven holes, laid out end to end from the clubhouse to the far end of the property. One played the holes out, turned around, and played the holes in, for a total of 22 holes. In 1764, several of the holes were deemed too short and therefore combined. The number was thereby reduced from 11 to nine so that a complete round of the links comprised 18 holes. Due to the status of St Andrews as the 'home of golf', other courses followed suit and the 18-hole course became the standard which has remained to the present day.

There are now more than 550 golf courses throughout the country, with at least 21 courses in Edinburgh alone.

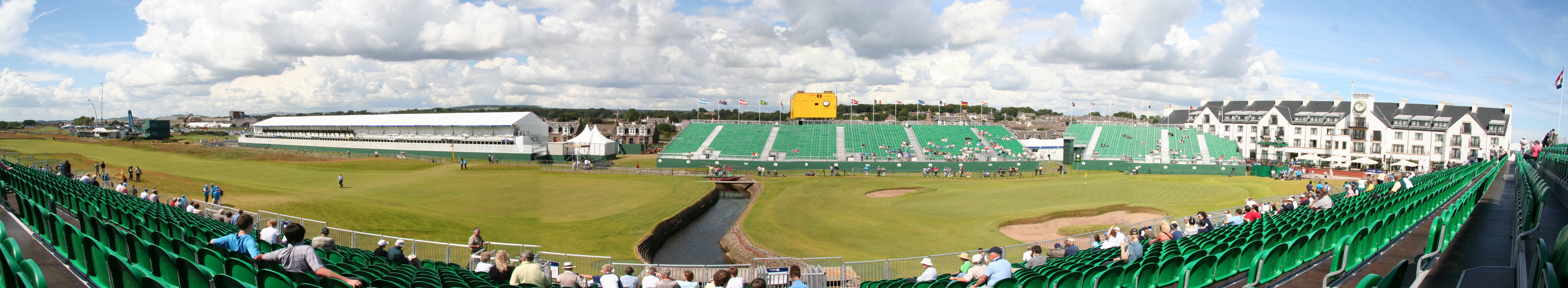
The 18th hole at Carnoustie, Angus, Scotland.

== Spreading the game outside Scotland ==
When James VI succeeded to the thrones of England and Ireland in 1603 (see Union of the Crowns) a large number of his Scottish courtiers followed him to London. The King resided at Greenwich Palace, and there is documentary evidence that some of these Scottish noblemen played golf on Blackheath, on the hill behind the palace. Henry Frederick, Prince of Wales, the king's eldest son, was playing golf in 1606. The Royal Blackheath Golf Club traces its origins from these Scottish noblemen, thus claiming a pre-1745 foundation date. Although it is certainly the oldest English golf club and the oldest outside Scotland, there is no evidence that it is the oldest golf club in the world, as is sometimes claimed. This accolade is claimed by The Royal Burgess Golfing Society of Edinburgh who date back to 1735.

The first record of North American golf was a consignment of 96 golf clubs and 432 golf balls which was shipped from Leith to Charleston, South Carolina, in 1743; and on 29 September 1786 Scottish merchants established the South Carolina Golf Club in Charleston, the first golf club in the United States.

== Players ==
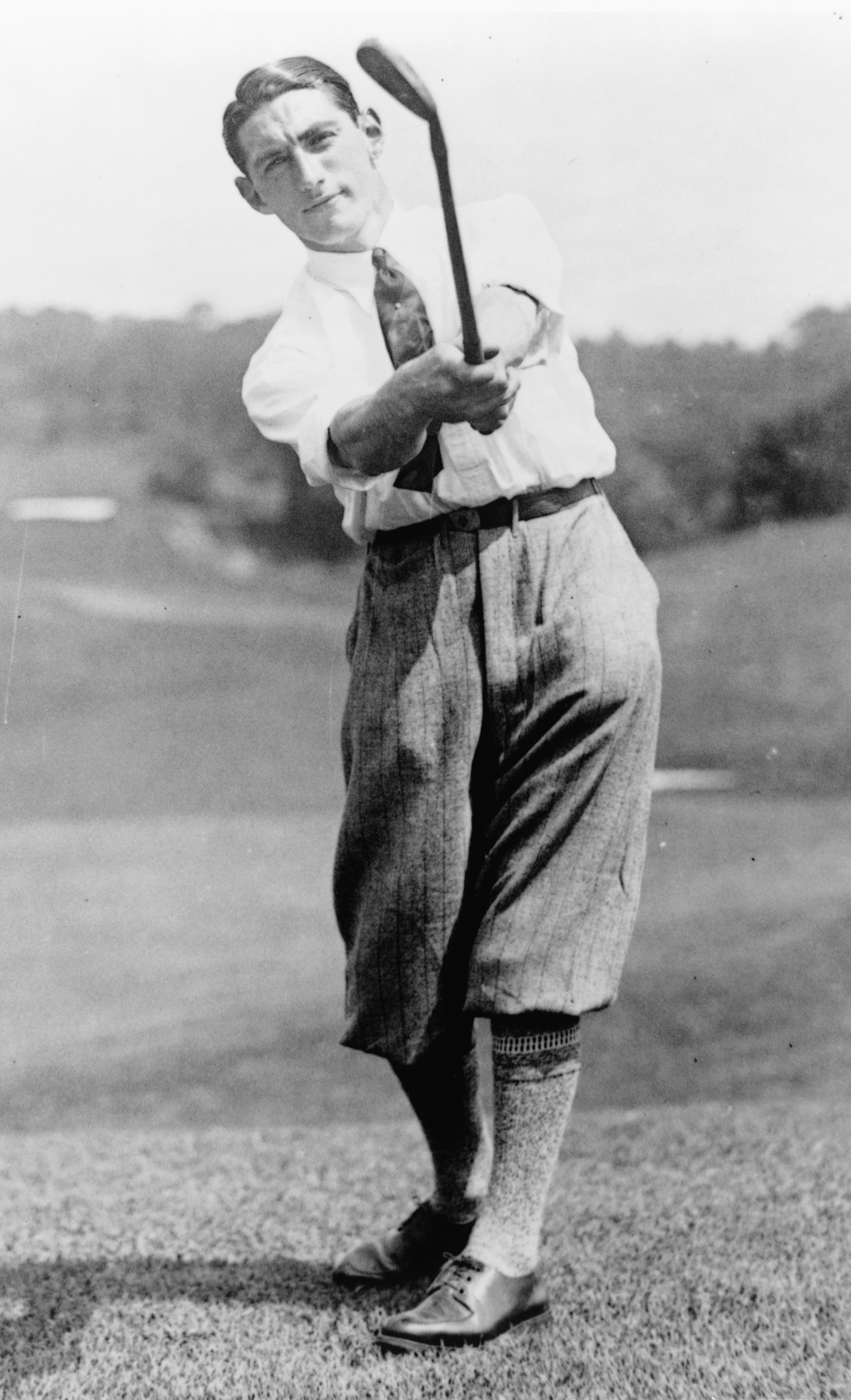
Tommy Armour, 'The Silver Scot'

Several Scots golfers are members of the World Golf Hall of Fame. Players marked * are also members of the Scottish Sports Hall of Fame:

- Willie Anderson* (1879–1910)
- Tommy Armour* (1894–1968)
- James Braid* (1870–1950)
- Dorothy Campbell (1883–1945)
- Jock Hutchison (1884–1977)
- Sandy Lyle (1958– )
- Alister MacKenzie (1870–1934) – golf course architect
- Colin Montgomerie (1963– )
- Old Tom Morris* (1821–1908)
- Young Tom Morris* (1851–1875)
- Willie Park, Sr. (1834–1903)
- Allan Robertson (1815–1859)
- Donald Ross (1872–1948) – golf course architect

Belle Robertson (born 1936) and Jessie Valentine (1915–2006) are all inducted into the Scottish Sports Hall of Fame, but not the World Golf Hall of Fame.

== See also ==
- Sport in Scotland
- Scottish Golf Union
- R&A World Golf Museum
- Timeline of golf history (1353-1850)
- Timeline of golf history (1851-1945)
- Timeline of golf history (1945-1999)
- Timeline of golf (2000-present)
- History of golf
- Football Act 1424
- Sports tourism
