= 2024 Tartan Pro Tour =

Golf tour season

2024 Tartan Pro Tour season
- Duration: 14 May 2024 – 9 October 2024
- Number of official events: 13
- Most wins: (Scotland) Sam Locke (3)
- Order of Merit: (Scotland) Graeme Robertson

The 2024 Tartan Pro Tour, titled as the 2024 Farmfoods Tartan Pro Tour for sponsorships reasons, was the fifth season of the Tartan Pro Tour, a third-tier tour recognised by the European Tour.

== Challenge Tour status ==
In December 2023, it was confirmed that an additional player (two in total) from the Tartan Pro Tour Order of Merit would be awarded Challenge Tour status for the following season.

== OWGR inclusion ==
In May, it was announced that all Tartan Pro Tour events, beginning in May, would receive Official World Golf Ranking points.

== Schedule ==
The following table lists official events during the 2024 season.

Date	Tournament	Location	Purse (£)	Winner (Note: The number in brackets after each winner's name is the number of Tartan Pro Tour events they had won up to and including that tournament. It is rare for someone to accumulate many wins on the Tartan Pro Tour as success at this level usually leads to promotion to the Challenge Tour.)	OWGR points
16 May	Montrose Links Masters	Angus	25,000	(Scotland) Sam Locke (5)	0.70
29 May	Portlethen Classic	Aberdeenshire	25,000	(Scotland) Sam Locke (6)	0.56
13 Jun	Cardrona Classic	Peeblesshire	25,000	(Scotland) Sebastian Sandin (a) (1)	0.49
27 Jun	Newmachar Classic	Aberdeenshire	25,000	(Scotland) Bradley Neil (1)	0.54
4 Jul	Schloss Roxburghe Masters	Roxburghshire	25,000	(Scotland) Darren Howie (1)	0.44
12 Jul	Ladybank Masters	Fife	25,000	(Scotland) Graeme Robertson (2)	0.68
17 Jul	Nairn Dunbar Classic	Nairn	25,000	(England) Nick McCarthy (1)	0.63
30 Jul	Blairgowrie Perthshire Masters	Perthshire	25,000	(Scotland) James Ross (1)	0.64
21 Aug	Leven Links Classic	Fife	25,000	(England) Ben Robinson (1)	0.58
5 Sep	MacDonald Spey Valley Masters	Moray	25,000	(Scotland) Graeme Robertson (3)	0.60
18 Sep	St Andrews Classic	Fife	25,000	(Scotland) Sam Locke (7)	0.64
25 Sep	Gleneagles Masters	Perthshire	25,000	(Scotland) Greg Dalziel (1)	0.68
9 Oct	Trump International Tour Championship	Aberdeenshire	30,000	(Scotland) Calum Fyfe (2)	0.51

== Order of Merit ==
The Order of Merit was based on tournament results during the season, calculated using a points-based system. The top two players on the Order of Merit earned status to play on the 2025 Challenge Tour (HotelPlanner Tour).

Position	Player	Points	Status earned
1	(Scotland) Graeme Robertson	28,792	Promoted to Challenge Tour
2	(Scotland) Sam Locke	20,780	Promoted to Challenge Tour
3	(Scotland) John Henry	13,347	
4	(Scotland) Calum Fyfe	12,723	
5	(Scotland) Greg Dalziel	11,606	
6	(Scotland) John Paterson	11,470	
7	(Scotland) Kieran Cantley	11,074	
8	(England) Nick McCarthy	10,103	
9	(Scotland) Callum Bruce	9,908	
10	(Scotland) Darren Howie	9,396	
