= 2026 Tartan Pro Tour =

Golf tour season

2026 Tartan Pro Tour season
- Duration: 28 April 2026 – 9 October 2026
- Number of official events: 15
- Most wins: (Scotland) Sam Locke (2) (Scotland) Will Porter (2) (Scotland) Michael Stewart (2) (United States) John Vogelpohl (2)
- Order of Merit: (United States) John Vogelpohl

The 2026 Tartan Pro Tour was the seventh season of the Tartan Pro Tour, a third-tier tour recognised by the European Tour.

== Schedule ==
The following table lists official events during the 2026 season.

Date	Tournament	Location	Purse (£)	Winner (Note: The number in brackets after each winner's name is the number of Tartan Pro Tour events they had won up to and including that tournament. It is rare for someone to accumulate many wins on the Tartan Pro Tour as success at this level usually leads to promotion to the Challenge Tour.)	OWGR points
30 Apr	Royal Dornoch Masters	Sutherland	27,000	(Scotland) Craig Howie (1)	0.91
15 May	Montrose Links Masters	Angus	27,500	(Scotland) Michael Stewart (2)	0.57
27 May	Southerness Classic	Dumfries	24,000	(Scotland) Mitchell Cowie (1)	0.58
13 Jun	Scottish Par 3 Championship	Aberdeenshire	25,000	(Scotland) Sam Locke (9)	n/a
17 Jun	Portlethen Classic	Aberdeenshire	27,000	(Scotland) Michael Stewart (3)	0.52
26 Jun	Newmachar Classic	Aberdeenshire	24,750	(Scotland) Aidan O'Hagan (1)	0.60
3 Jul	Cardrona Classic	Peeblesshire	24,000	(Scotland) Graeme Robertson (4)	0.58
7 Jul	Blairgowrie Perthshire Masters	Perthshire	26,250	(Scotland) Sam Locke (10)	0.60
24 Jul	Downfield Masters	Perthshire	27,250	(Scotland) John Paterson (2)	0.64
19 Aug	Leven Links Classic	Fife	27,500	(Scotland) Greg Dalziel (4)	0.65
2 Sep	Fairmont St Andrews Classic	Fife	27,500	(Scotland) Will Porter (1)	0.68
10 Sep	MacDonald Spey Valley Masters	Moray	27,500	(United States) John Vogelpohl (1)	0.45
23 Sep	St Andrews Classic	Fife	27,500	(Scotland) Craig Ross (1)	0.62
30 Sep	Duddingston Classic	Midlothian	27,500	(Scotland) Will Porter (2)	0.43
9 Oct	Gleneagles Masters	Perthshire	30,000	(United States) John Vogelpohl (2)	0.65

== Order of Merit ==
The Order of Merit was based on tournament results during the season, calculated using a points-based system. The top two players on the Order of Merit earned status to play on the 2027 Challenge Tour (HotelPlanner Tour).

Position	Player	Points	Status earned
1	(United States) John Vogelpohl	24,991	Promoted to Challenge Tour
2	(Scotland) Michael Stewart	18,046	Promoted to Challenge Tour
3	(Scotland) Craig Howie	15,805	
4	(Scotland) Sam Locke	15,320	
5	(Scotland) Craig Ross	14,744	
6	(England) James Wilson	12,616	
7	(Scotland) John Paterson	12,332	
8	(Scotland) Will Porter	12,037	
9	(Scotland) Mitchell Cowie	11,156	
10	(Scotland) Greg Dalziel	10,244	
