= Frank Deighton =

Scottish golfer

Personal information
- Full name: Frank William Gordon Deighton
- Nationality: Scotland
- Born: 21 May 1927 Alexandria, Dumbartonshire, Scotland
- Died: 23 February 2018 (aged 90) Glasgow, Scotland

Career
- Sport: Golf
- Status: Amateur

Best results in major championships
- Masters Tournament: DNP
- PGA Championship: DNP
- U.S. Open: DNP
- The Open Championship: 46th: 1960

Frank William Gordon Deighton (21 May 1927 – 23 February 2018) was a Scottish amateur golfer. He won one of the leading Scottish amateur golfers of the 1950s.

As an individual, he won the Scottish Amateur twice, in 1956 and 1959. He represented Great Britain and Ireland in two Walker Cup matches, in 1951 and 1957, and also in the Commonwealth Tournament in 1954 and 1959.

Deighton was a GP.

== Amateur wins ==
- 1956 Scottish Amateur
- 1959 Scottish Amateur

== Team appearances ==
- Walker Cup (representing Great Britain & Ireland): 1951, 1957
- Commonwealth Tournament (representing Great Britain): 1954, 1959
- Amateurs–Professionals Match (representing the Amateurs): 1956, 1957
