= Michael Stewart (golfer) =

Scottish professional golfer (born 1990)

Personal information
- Nationality: Scotland
- Born: 5 March 1990 (age 36)
- Height: 5 ft 9 in (175 cm)

Career
- Sport: Golf
- College: East Tennessee State University
- Turned professional: 2011
- Current tour: Tartan Pro Tour
- Former tours: Challenge Tour; PGA EuroPro Tour
- Professional wins: 4

Best results in major championships
- Masters Tournament: DNP
- PGA Championship: DNP
- U.S. Open: DNP
- The Open Championship: T52: 2023

Michael Stewart (born 5 March 1990) is a Scottish professional golfer and Challenge Tour player.

== Amateur career ==
Stewart had a successful amateur career and won the 2010 Scottish Amateur and 2011 South African Amateur. In 2008, he was runner-up at the St Andrews Links Trophy and in 2011, he lost the final of The Amateur Championship to Bryden Macpherson, 3 and 2.

Stewart won the 2009 European Amateur Team Championship with Scotland, beating an England team led by Tommy Fleetwood in the final 5–2. He was part of the Great Britain and Ireland team at the 2011 Walker Cup that beat a U.S. side featuring Jordan Spieth and Patrick Cantlay.

In 2008, Stewart enrolled at East Tennessee State University where he majored in sports management and played with the East Tennessee State Buccaneers men's golf team alongside Séamus Power and Rhys Enoch.

== Professional career ==
Stewart turned professional in 2011. He joined the PGA EuroPro Tour where he won the 2022 Eagle Orchid Scottish Masters to finish second in the Order of Merit, earning promotion to the Challenge Tour for 2023.

Stewart made his major debut at the 2023 Open Championship at Royal Liverpool Golf Club after qualifying at Dundonald Links. He shot a three-under-par 68 to sit in a tie for seventh after the opening day, just two shots off the lead, and in tied 11th after day two.

== Amateur wins ==
- 2010 Scottish Amateur
- 2011 South African Amateur

== Professional wins (4) ==
=== PGA EuroPro Tour wins (1) ===
No.	Date	Tournament	Winning score	Margin of victory	Runner-up
1	16 Sep 2022	Eagle Orchid Scottish Masters	−20 (65-62-69=196)	3 strokes	(Northern Ireland) Dermot McElroy

=== Tartan Pro Tour wins (3) ===
No.	Date	Tournament	Winning score	Margin of victory	Runner(s)-up
1	14 Oct 2021	Royal Aberdeen Granite City Classic	−6 (70-66=136)	Playoff	(Scotland) Daniel Young
2	15 May 2026	Montrose Links Masters	−9 (68-65-71=204)	2 strokes	(Scotland) Daniel Kay, (Scotland) Craig Ross
3	17 Jun 2026	Portlethen Classic	−17 (67-63-66=196)	3 strokes	(United States) John Vogelpohl

== Results in major championships ==
Tournament	2023
Masters Tournament	
PGA Championship	
U.S. Open	
The Open Championship	T52

Did not play

"T" = tied

== Team appearances ==
Amateur

- Jacques Léglise Trophy (representing Great Britain & Ireland): 2007 (winners), 2008 (winners)
- Home Internationals (representing Scotland): 2008, 2009, 2010, 2011
- European Boys' Team Championship (representing Scotland): 2008
- European Amateur Team Championship (representing Scotland): 2008, 2009 (winners), 2010, 2011
- Eisenhower Trophy (representing Scotland): 2010
- St Andrews Trophy (representing Great Britain and Ireland): 2010
- Walker Cup (representing Great Britain & Ireland): 2011
