= Timeline of golf (2000–present) =

The following is a partial timeline of the history of golf.

== 2000 ==
=== Men's golf ===
Tiger Woods recorded the most dominant season in history by any player. He won 11 of the 25 events he entered worldwide, including three major championships, breaking all-time scoring records at each. His season-long scoring average was 68.11, breaking an all-time record most thought would never be beaten, set by Byron Nelson in 1945 (68.33). It was calculated that his lead in the (24-month) world rankings at the end of 2000 was so great that he could take 2001 off altogether, and still be world number one at the end of that year.

- Major championship results:

- April - Masters Tournament - Vijay Singh won his second major title in six events, playing steady golf to hold off the challenges of Ernie Els and David Duval.

- June - U.S. Open - Tiger Woods broke almost every record associated with the U.S. Open. His score of 12 under par was the best in relation to par ever recorded at the US Open, and his victory margin of 15 strokes was the largest ever in any major. His score of 272 also equalled the 72-hole stroke record for the event.

- July - The Open Championship - Tiger Woods scored 19 under par, the best in relation to par ever recorded at The Open, and at any men's major championship. His victory means he becomes only the sixth player ever to win the U.S. and British Opens in the same year, following Bobby Jones, Gene Sarazen, Ben Hogan, Lee Trevino and Tom Watson. Ernie Els finishes a distant second - his third runner-up finish in a major of the season, although Els has taken 23 more shots than Woods at the two Opens.

- August - PGA Championship - Tiger Woods won in a three-hole playoff against Bob May. Both finished regulation at 18 under par, the best score in relation to par ever recorded at the PGA Championship.

- PGA Tour leading money winner for the year: Tiger Woods - $9,188,321
- Senior PGA Tour leading money winner: Larry Nelson - $2,708,005

=== Women's golf ===
- U.S. Women's Open: Karrie Webb
- LPGA Championship: Juli Inkster
- Karrie Webb: leading money winner on the LPGA tour, earning $1,876,853.

== 2001 ==
=== Men's golf ===
Tiger Woods completes what becomes known as the "Tiger Slam", holding off David Duval and Phil Mickelson to win the Masters Championship in April to become the first golfer in history to hold, concurrently, all four professional major championships. For good measure, Woods had won the game's fifth most important event, the Tournament Players' Championship as well, in March.

By the end of the year, however, Woods would have relinquished three of his titles, on each occasion to players winning their first major title. At the U.S. Open, South African Retief Goosen finally emerged triumphant from a playoff with Mark Brooks, after three-putting from 12 feet on the 72nd hole the previous day knowing that he had two putts for victory. Playing partner Stewart Cink also missed an 18-inch putt of his own at the last hole that, as events turned out, would have allowed him to join the playoff.

The Open Championship is won by David Duval, whose third round of 65 turns the final day into something of a victory progression. Unknown Swedish player Niclas Fasth finishes second, playing his way into Europe's Ryder Cup side ahead of Ian Woosnam, who incurs a two-shot penalty after his caddie realises he is carrying 15 clubs. Then in August, the PGA Championship goes to David Toms as Phil Mickelson again finished runner-up in a major championship. Toms' 72-hole total of 265 is the best ever recorded in a major championship (though not the best in relation to par, even at the PGA Championship).

Following the terrible events of 9/11, the Ryder Cup is postponed for twelve months, and it is agreed that the event would continue to be played in even years from that point forward. The terrorist attacks force several leading American players to revise plans to compete in the World Matchplay Championship in England in October. 43-year-old former champion Ian Woosnam, who had suffered such an unusual fate at the Open, is brought in as a replacement, and beats Goosen, Colin Montgomerie and Pádraig Harrington to win the event for a third time.

- PGA Tour leading money winner for the year: Tiger Woods - $5,687,777
- Senior PGA Tour leading money winner: Allen Doyle - $2,553,582
- Ryder Cup postponed until 2002

=== Women's golf ===
- Kraft Nabisco Championship - Annika Sörenstam
- U.S. Women's Open - Karrie Webb
- LPGA Championship - Karrie Webb
- Women's British Open - Se Ri Pak
- Annika Sörenstam: leading money winner on the LPGA tour, earning $2,105,868

== 2002 ==
=== Men's golf ===
Tiger Woods enjoys another supremely dominant season. He wins both The Masters and the U.S. Open by three shots (from Retief Goosen and Phil Mickelson, respectively), becoming only the fifth player in history to win both in the same season. His opportunity for a single-season Grand Slam, however, is literally blown away on Saturday at The Open Championship, as the worst of the Muirfield weather closes in and Woods hits 81. Colin Montgomerie, who had shot 64 the previous day, shoots 84 in similar conditions. Ernie Els plays brilliantly given the conditions to record a 72, and wins after a 4-man playoff, the first in major championship history, involving Steve Elkington, Stuart Appleby and Frenchman Thomas Levet.

Woods then surprisingly misses out at the PGA Championship, when unheralded Rich Beem does enough to hold on to a one-shot lead over Tiger over the closing holes, after Justin Leonard loses his third-round lead.

- Tiger Woods is the PGA Tour's leading money winner for the year with earnings of $6,912,625 in 18 events.
- Hale Irwin is the leading money winner on the Senior PGA Tour with earnings of $3,028,304 in 27 events.
- At The Belfry golf course near Sutton Coldfield, England, the European team defeats the United States team 15.5-12.5 to win the Ryder Cup.

=== Women's golf ===
- Kraft Nabisco Championship - Annika Sörenstam
- U.S. Women's Open - Juli Inkster
- LPGA Championship - Se Ri Pak
- Women's British Open - Karrie Webb
- Annika Sörenstam: leading money winner on the LPGA tour, earning $2,863,904

== 2003 ==
=== Men's golf ===
- Major Championship results:
  - April 10–13 - The Masters - Mike Weir becomes the first Canadian to win a major, and the first left-handed golfer to win The Masters. He defeats Len Mattiace on the first playoff hole.
  - June 12–15 - U.S. Open - Jim Furyk wins his first major by 3 shots at Olympia Fields, in what he makes a comfortable victory. Furyk equals the U.S. Open record of 272, although this represents eight under par (not twelve under, as it was when Tiger Woods posted the same score in 2000).
  - July 17–20- The Open Championship - Ben Curtis, an unknown 26-year-old who had only qualified for the event by virtue of a top-ten finish at the previous month's Western Open, shocks the world, finishing a single shot ahead of Thomas Bjørn and Vijay Singh at Royal St George's. His victory comes after Bjorn twice failed to escape from a bunker next to the 16th green in the final round. Curtis's win is his first ever as a professional, who was ranked 396th in the world at the start of the Open.
  - August 14–17 - PGA Championship - Shaun Micheel, another virtual unknown although a tour player for several seasons, emulates Curtis by making his first professional victory a major championship. He wins by 2 shots from Chad Campbell at the tough Oak Hill Country Club. Unlike Curtis, Micheel would never win another PGA Tour event. These results meant that for the first time since 1969, all four majors were won by golfers who had never before won a major title.
- Other highlights
  - March 2 - Tiger Woods wins the Accenture Match Play Championships, defeating David Toms 2 and 1.
  - April 20 - Davis Love III chips in on the 72nd hole to force a playoff, which he wins, giving him his fifth victory at the MCI Heritage at Harbour Town.
  - May 22 - At the Bank of America Colonial golf tournament, LPGA champion Annika Sörenstam became the first woman in 58 years to compete in a men's professional golf tournament.
  - June 1 - Kenny Perry wins for the second straight week, this time at The Memorial, held at Muirfield Village Golf Club.
  - July 6 - Tiger Woods wins the 100th Western Open at Cog Hill.
- Vijay Singh is the PGA Tour's leading money winner for the year, with earnings of $7,349,907 in 27 events.
- The Senior PGA Tour renames itself the Champions Tour. Tom Watson is the tour's leading money winner, with earnings of $1,853,108 in 14 events.
- Presidents Cup - For the first time ever, the Cup is shared between the United States and International teams. The result comes after a playoff - between each team's leading player Tiger Woods and Ernie Els - has to be abandoned due to bad light.

=== Women's golf ===
- Major results
  - Kraft Nabisco Championship - Patricia Meunier-Lebouc
  - U.S. Women's Open - Hilary Lunke wins an 18-hole playoff over Angela Stanford and Kelly Robbins for what would be her only LPGA Tour win.
  - LPGA Championship - Annika Sörenstam
  - Women's British Open - Annika Sörenstam
- Annika Sörenstam was the leading money winner on the LPGA tour, with earnings of $2,029,506.
- Michelle Wie, then 13 years old, becomes the youngest person ever to win a USGA event for adults by winning the U.S. Women's Amateur Public Links.

== 2004 ==
For brief details see 2004 in sports#Golf and for fuller details see 2004 in golf.

== 2005 ==
For brief details see 2005 in sports#Golf and for fuller details see 2005 in golf.

== 2006 ==
For brief details see 2006 in sports#Golf and for fuller details see 2006 in golf.

== 2007 ==
For brief details see 2007 in sports#Golf and for fuller details see 2007 in golf.

== 2008 ==
For brief details see 2008 in sports#Golf and for fuller details see 2008 in golf.

== 2009 ==
For brief details see 2009 in sports#Golf and for fuller details see 2009 in golf.
