= Scottish Golf =

Governing body for golf in Scotland

Scottish Golf is the governing body for amateur golf in Scotland. It was formed in 2015 as a merger between the Scottish Golf Union, the governing body for men, and the Scottish Ladies’ Golfing Association, the equivalent body for women. Its predecessor the SGU was established in 1920, and it is based in St Andrews, Fife.

It is affiliated to The R&A, which is also based at St Andrews, and is responsible for administering the Rules of Golf, as laid down by The R&A, at the national level. Scottish Golf organises tournaments, manages Scotland’s national teams, and promotes the game, for example by lobbying governments.

== See also ==
- Golf in Scotland
