= Lloyd Saltman =

Scottish golfer

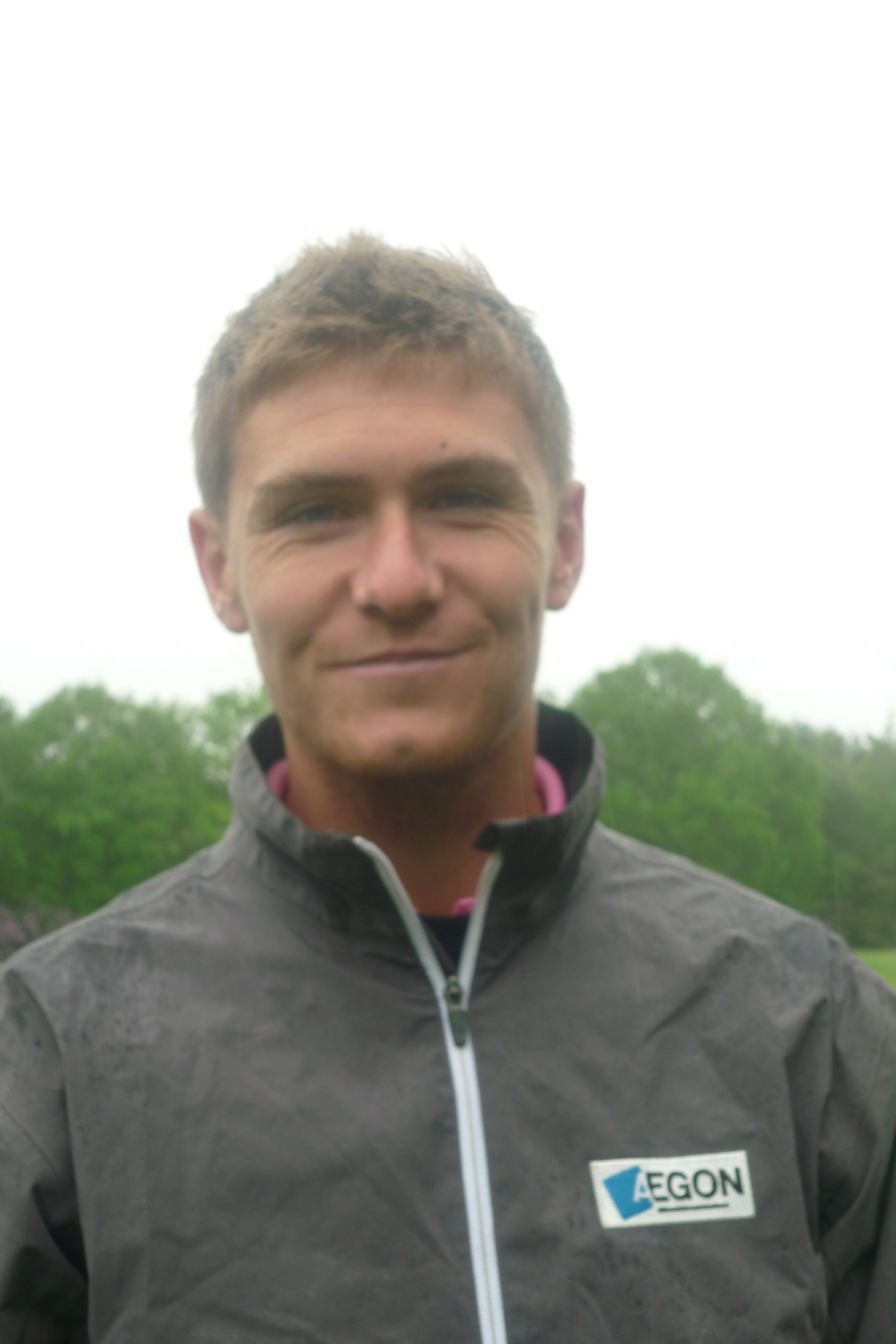

Personal information
- Nationality: Scotland
- Born: 10 September 1985 (age 41) Edinburgh, Scotland
- Height: 6 ft 2 in (1.88 m)

Career
- Sport: Golf
- Turned professional: 2007
- Former tour: European Tour
- Professional wins: 2

Best results in major championships
- Masters Tournament: DNP
- PGA Championship: DNP
- U.S. Open: DNP
- The Open Championship: T15: 2005

Lloyd Saltman (born 10 September 1985) is a Scottish professional golfer.

== Early life and amateur career ==
Saltman was born in Edinburgh, Scotland, and is the grandson of former Hibernian goalkeeper Tommy Younger. He had a successful career as an amateur golfer, with wins in several prestigious tournaments including the 2003 Scottish Boys' Championship, 2005 Brabazon Trophy, 2005 St Andrews Links Trophy, 2007 Irish Amateur Open Championship, 2007 Lytham Trophy, and the 2007 Scottish Champion of Champions. In 2005 he finished 15th in The Open Championship at St Andrews, to win the Silver Medal as the low amateur having finished one stroke ahead of Eric Ramsay.

Saltman competed for Great Britain and Ireland in two Walker Cup matches, the first in 2005 and again in 2007.

== Professional career ==
Shortly after his second appearance, he turned professional and attempted to qualify for the European Tour. However he failed to progress to the final stage of the qualifying school and, with limited guaranteed playing opportunities in Europe, decided to try for his card on the Asian Tour. He finished 31st at the Asian Tour School at the end of 2007, to gain a place on the tour. However, because of the reputation he built up as an amateur, Saltman received invitations to many European Tour and Challenge Tour events during 2008, and played in just two tournaments on the Asian Tour, finishing in 17th place on his début in the SAIL Open.

At the end of 2008, Saltman returned to the European Tour's qualifying school, and although he reached the final stage after coming through a seven-man playoff, he missed out on winning a European Tour card meaning he would have another season on the Challenge Tour in 2009.

In July 2009 Saltman and his brother Elliot both qualified for the Open Championship at Turnberry, to become the first brothers to appear together in The Open since 1985, when Seve and Manuel Ballesteros both played. After two years on the European Challenge Tour Saltman gained a full European Tour Card in December 2010 by finishing 11th in the Stage 3 of European Tour Qualifying School. His youngest brother Zack, is also a professional golfer.

== Amateur wins ==
- 2003 Scottish Boys Strokeplay Championship
- 2005 Brabazon Trophy, St Andrews Links Trophy
- 2007 Irish Amateur Open Championship, Lytham Trophy, Scottish Champion of Champions

== Professional wins (2) ==
=== Tartan Pro Tour wins (1) ===
No.	Date	Tournament	Winning score	Margin of victory	Runners-up
1	12 Oct 2021	Renaissance Club Classic	−7 (73-62=135)	Playoff	(Scotland) Craig Lee, (Scotland) Daniel Young

=== Hi5 Pro Tour wins (1) ===
No.	Date	Tournament	Winning score	Margin of victory	Runners-up
1	3 Feb 2011	Hacienda de Alamo Open	−21 (65-64-66=195)	13 strokes	(Denmark) Joachim B. Hansen, (England) James Hepworth

== Results in major championships ==
Tournament	2005	2006	2007	2008	2009	2010	2011	2012	2013
The Open Championship	T15LA				CUT				CUT

Note: Saltman only played in The Open Championship.

Did not play

LA = Low amateur
CUT = missed the half-way cut
"T" = tied

== Team appearances ==
Amateur

- European Boys' Team Championship (representing Scotland): 2003
- European Youths' Team Championship (representing Scotland): 2004 (winners), 2006
- European Amateur Team Championship (representing Scotland): 2005, 2007
- Walker Cup (representing Great Britain & Ireland): 2005, 2007
- St Andrews Trophy (representing Great Britain & Ireland): 2006 (winners)
- Jacques Léglise Trophy (representing Great Britain & Ireland): 2003 (winners)

== See also ==
- 2010 European Tour Qualifying School graduates
