= Jack McDonald (golfer) =

Scottish professional golfer (born 1993)

Personal information
- Nationality: Scotland
- Born: 12 February 1993 (age 33) Bothwell, Scotland

Career
- Sport: Golf
- College: University of Stirling
- Turned professional: 2016
- Current tour: Challenge Tour
- Former tours: PGA EuroPro Tour; Tartan Pro Tour
- Professional wins: 5

Best results in major championships
- Masters Tournament: DNP
- PGA Championship: DNP
- U.S. Open: DNP
- The Open Championship: 77th: 2026

Achievements and awards
- Tartan Pro Tour Order of Merit winner: 2022

Jack McDonald (born 12 February 1993) is a Scottish professional golfer and Challenge Tour player. He was runner-up at the 2023 Finnish Challenge. As an amateur, he had team wins at the 2014 European Nations Cup – Copa Sotogrande, 2014 Palmer Cup, 2015 European Amateur Team Championship, 2015 Walker Cup, and 2016 Bonallack Trophy.

== Amateur career ==
McDonald had a successful amateur career. He reached the semi finals of The Amateur Championship both in 2012 at Royal Troon Golf Club, and in 2015 at Carnoustie Golf Links. He made his first European Tour start as a 19-year-old at the 2012 Scottish Open at Castle Stuart, where he made the cut to play alongside Ernie Els.

Playing for Scotland, McDonald won the 2014 European Nations Cup – Copa Sotogrande alongside Bradley Neil, and the 2015 European Amateur Team Championship at Halmstad Golf Club alongside Ewen Ferguson, Grant Forrest and Connor Syme.

McDonald helped Europe win the 2014 Palmer Cup 18.5–11.5, beating Bryson DeChambeau, 2 and 1, in his final day singles match. McDonald again met DeChambeau at the 2015 Walker Cup at Royal Lytham & St Annes Golf Club, where his side beat the United States by a record seven-point margin.

McDonald attended the University of Stirling where his coach was Dean Robertson.

== Professional career ==
McDonald turned professional in May 2016. In 2017, he joined the Challenge Tour, where he would mainly play for the next 10 seasons. His best finish as a rookie was a tie for 5th at the Swedish Challenge, and in 2023 he produced his career best result, a runner-up finish at the Finnish Challenge, behind Finland's Lauri Ruuska.

He played several seasons on the Tartan Pro Tour, where he won three events on the 2022 Tartan Pro Tour, and topped the Order of Merit.

McDonald earned starts in The Open Championship after coming through Final Qualifying at Dundonald Links, in both 2024 and 2026. He made the cut on his second attempt, at Royal Birkdale Golf Club, after producing one of the shots of the tournament by holing out from 114 yards for an eagle on the par-4 10th hole, pocketing nearly £30,000 in prize money.

== Personal life ==
McDonald is the grandson of Gordon Cosh, who played in the 1977 Open Championship at Turnberry, known for the "duel in the sun". In 2026, McDonald was training as a PGA teaching pro under David Orr at Whitecraigs Golf Club.

== Amateur wins ==
- 2011 Stirling Invitational
- 2012 BUCS Student Tour Finals, BUCS Student Tour #1, BUCS Student Tour #4
- 2013 BUCS Student Tour Finals, Tennant Cup, North of Scotland Amateur, South East District Championship
- 2014 Scottish Student Championship

== Professional wins (5) ==
=== Tartan Pro Tour wins (4) ===
No.	Date	Tournament	Winning score	Margin of victory	Runner(s)-up
1	12 Apr 2022	Blairgowrie Perthshire Masters	−6 (70-68=138)	Playoff	(Scotland) Fraser Moore, (England) Rhys Thompson
2	26 Apr 2022	Royal Dornoch Masters	−9 (66-65=131)	1 stroke	(Scotland) Kieran Cantley
3	14 Oct 2022	Panmure Masters	−10 (64-66=130)	2 strokes	(Republic of Ireland) Brendan McCarroll, (Scotland) Graeme Robertson
4	15 Oct 2025	Trump International Tour Championship	−13 (64-67-72=203)	7 strokes	(Scotland) Craig Ross, (Scotland) Sebastian Sandin

=== PGA EuroPro Tour wins (1) ===
No.	Date	Tournament	Winning score	Margin of victory	Runner-up
1	20 Sep 2019	Newmachar Golf Club Challenge	−16 (69-65-66=200)	1 stroke	(Northern Ireland) Jonathan Caldwell

== Results in major championships ==
Tournament	2024	2025	2026
Masters Tournament			
PGA Championship			
U.S. Open			
The Open Championship	CUT		77

Did not play

== Team appearances ==
Amateur

- Boys Home Internationals (representing Scotland): 2009
- Men's Home Internationals (representing Scotland): 2012 (winners), 2013, 2014, 2015
- European Nations Cup – Copa Sotogrande (representing Scotland): 2014 (winners), 2016
- Palmer Cup (representing Europe): 2014 (winners)
- European Amateur Team Championship (representing Scotland): 2013, 2014, 2015 (winners)
- Walker Cup (representing Great Britain & Ireland): 2015
- Bonallack Trophy (representing Europe): 2016 (winners)
