= Tartan Pro Tour =

Professional golf tour

- Current season, competition or edition: 2026 Tartan Pro Tour
- Formerly: Farmfoods Tartan Pro Tour
- Sport: Golf
- Founded: 2020
- Founder: Paul Lawrie
- First season: 2020
- Countries: Based in Scotland
- Most titles: Tournament wins: (Scotland) Sam Locke (10)
- Related competitions: Clutch Pro Tour
- Website: https://www.tartanprotour.co.uk

The Tartan Pro Tour is a series of developmental golf tournaments played in Scotland. The tour is open to both male and female professionals.

== History ==
The tour was founded and created by 1999 Open Champion Paul Lawrie in 2020. The tour was formed during the COVID-19 pandemic and was created to give UK-based professionals playing opportunities, especially as the PGA EuroPro Tour had cancelled its 2020 season.

In December 2022, it was announced that the Tartan Pro Tour and the Clutch Pro Tour would become official feeder tours to the Challenge Tour in place of the now-defunct PGA EuroPro Tour. The Tartan Pro Tour would offer Challenge Tour status to the leading player on the Order of Merit. In December 2023, it was confirmed that the Challenge Tour cards on offer from the Order of Merit would be increased to two for the 2024 season. For 2025, the top three players on the Order of Merit were given access to the second stage of European Tour Q School, up from two the previous season.

In May 2024, it was announced that the tour would be included into the Official World Golf Ranking with immediate affect, having undergone a 16-month application process.

In 2025, the tour was upgraded from a feeder tour to a satellite Tour, which included an automatic promotion to the Challenge Tour for a player who wins three times in a season.

Tartan Pro Tour tournaments are 54-hole events with 36-hole cuts to the top 30 plus ties.

== Order of Merit winners ==
Year	Winner	Points
2026	(United States) John Vogelpohl	24,991
2025	(Scotland) Rory Franssen	22,383
2024	(Scotland) Graeme Robertson	28,792
Year	Winner	Prize money (£)
2023	(England) Rhys Thompson	21,958
2022	(Scotland) Jack McDonald	15,903
2021	(Scotland) Kieran Cantley	17,146
2020	(Scotland) Neil Fenwick	10,111
