= List of golf courses in South Africa =

This is a list of notable golf courses in South Africa by province.

== Eastern Cape ==
Golf course	Location
Alexander Golf Club	East London
East London Golf Club	East London
Gonubie Golf Club	Gonubie
Humewood Golf Club	Gqeberha
Kirkwood Golf Club	Kirkwood
Mthatha Country Club	Mthatha
Port Elizabeth Golf Club	Gqeberha
Uitenhage Golf Club	Uitenhage
Walmer Golf Club (Little Walmer)	Gqeberha
Wedgewood Golf Club	Gqeberha
West Bank Golf Club	East London
Wild Coast Sun Country Club	Near Port Edward

== Gauteng ==
Golf course	Location
Akasia Golf Club	Akasia
Benoni Country Club	Benoni
Bronkhorstspruit Golf Club	Bronkhorstspruit
Bryanston Country Club	Sandton
Centurion Country Club	Centurion
CMR Golf Club	Roodepoort
Cullinan Golf Club	Cullinan
Dainfern Golf Course	Sandton
Eagle Canyon Country Club	Roodepoort
Ebotse Links Golf Course	Benoni
ERPM Golf Club	Boksburg
Germiston Golf Club	Germiston
Glendower Golf Club	Edenvale
Glenvista Country Club	Johannesburg
Irene Country Club	Centurion
Jackal Creek Golf Club	Roodepoort
Kempton Park Golf Club	Kempton Park
Killarney Country Club	Johannesburg
Kimiad Golf Course	Pretoria
Krugersdorp Golf Club	Krugersdorp
Kyalami Country Club	Midrand
Modderfontein Golf Club	Modderfontein
Pretoria Country Club	Pretoria
Pretoria Golf Club	Pretoria
Randpark Golf Club	Randburg
Reading Country Club	Alberton
Royal Johannesburg & Kensington Golf Club	Johannesburg
Royal Oak Country Club	Brakpan
Ruimsig Country Club	Roodepoort
Serengeti Jack Nicklaus Signature Golf Course	Kempton Park
Services Golf Club	Pretoria
Silver Lakes Golf Club	Pretoria
State Mines Country Club	Brakpan
The Club at Steyn City	Midrand
The Country Club Johannesburg	Sandton
The Els Club	Centurion
The Lake Club Benoni	Benoni
The Presidential Golf Course	Pretoria
The River Club Golf Course	Sandton
Waterkloof Golf Club	Pretoria
Wingate Park Country Club	Pretoria
Woodhill Country Club	Pretoria
Zwartkop Country Club	Centurion

== KwaZulu-Natal ==
Golf course	Location
Amanzimtoti Country Club	eManzimtoti
Beachwood Country Club	Durban
Bluff National Park Golf Club	Durban
Bosch Hoek Golf Course	Balgowan
Camelot Golf Club	Hillcrest
Cato Ridge Country Club	Cato Ridge
Cotswold Downs Country Club	Hillcrest
Darnall Country Club	Darnall
Durban Country Club	Durban
Empangeni Country Club	Empangeni
Estcourt Golf Club	Estcourt
Gowries Farm Golf Course	Nottingham Road
Greytown Country Club	Greytown
Harding Country Club	Harding
Howick Golf Club	Howick
Kloof Country Club	Kloof
Kokstad Golf Club	Kokstad
Ladysmith Country Club	Ladysmith
Maidstone Golf Club	oThongathi
Margate Country Club	Margate
Maritzburg Golf Club	Pietermaritzburg
Mooi River Country Club	Mooi River
Mtunzini Country Club	Mtunzini
Mount Edgecombe Country Club	Mount Edgecombe
Newcastle Golf Club	Newcastle
Papwa Sewgolum Golf Course	Durban
Pongola Golf Club	oPhongolo
Port Edward Country Club	Port Edward
Port Shepstone Country Club	Port Shepstone
Prince's Grant Golf Estate	KwaDukuza
Richards Bay Country Club	Richards Bay
Richmond Country Club	Richmond
Royal Durban Golf Club	Durban
Sakabula Golf Course	Howick
San Lameer Country Club	Southbroom
Scottburgh Golf Club	Scottburgh
Selborne Golf Club	Pennington
Simbithi Country Club	Ballito
Southbroom Golf Club	Southbroom
Umdoni Park Golf Club	Pennington
Umhlali Country Club	Umhlali
Umkomaas Golf Club	eMkhomazi
Underberg Country Club	Underberg
Victoria Country Club	Pietermaritzburg
Vryheid Golf Club	Vryheid
Windsor Park Golf Course	Durban
Zimbali Country Club	Ballito

== Limpopo ==
Golf course	Location
Drakensig Golf Club	Hoedspruit
Euphoria Golf Course	Mookgophong
Fairview Golf Course	Tzaneen
Hans Merensky Golf Club	Phalaborwa
Kameeldoring Golf Club	Mokopane
Koro Creek Bushveld Golf Estate	Modimolle
Mogol Golf Club	Lephalale
Naboomspruit Golf Club	Mookgophong
Polokwane Golf Club	Polokwane
Soutpansberg Golf Club	Louis Trichardt
The Ranch Golf Course	Polokwane
Tzaneen Country Club	Tzaneen
Zebula Golf Course	Bela-Bela

== Mpumalanga ==
Golf course	Location
Bankenveld Golf Club	eMalahleni
Barberton Golf Club	Barberton
Kambaku Golf Club	Komatipoort
Leopard Creek Country Club	Malalane
Malelane Golf Club	Malalane
Mbombela Golf Club	Mbombela
Sabi River Sun Golf Club	Hazyview
Sabie Country Club	Sabie
White River Country Club	White River
Witbank Golf Club	eMalahleni

== North-West ==
Golf course	Location
Gary Player Country Club	Sun City

Mooi Mooi Country Club

== Western Cape ==
Golf course	Location
Arabella Golf Course	Kleinmond
Atlantic Beach Links	Melkbosstrand
Bellville Golf Club	Bellville
Clovelly Golf Club	Fish Hoek
Devonvale Golf & Wine Estate	Stellenbosch
De Zalze Golf Club	Stellenbosch
Durbanville Golf Club	Durbanville
Erinvale Golf Club	Somerset West
Fairview Golf Estate	Gordon's Bay
George Golf Club	George
Greenways Golf Estate	Strand
Goose Valley Golf Club	Plettenberg Bay
Hermanus Golf Club	Hermanus
King David Mowbray Golf Club	Cape Town
Kingswood Golf Course	George
Knysna Golf Club	Knysna
Kuilsrivier Golf Club	Kuilsrivier
Malmesbury Golf Club	Malmesbury
Metropolitan Golf Club	Cape Town
Milnerton Golf Club	Milnerton
Montagu (Fancourt)	George
Mossel Bay Golf Club	Mossel Bay
Oubaai Golf Club	Herolds Bay
Outeniqua (Fancourt)	George
Paarl Golf Club	Paarl
Parow Golf Club	Parow
Pearl Valley Jack Nicklaus Signature Golf Course	Paarl
Pezula Championship Golf Course	Knysna
Pinnacle Point Golf Club	Mossel Bay
Plettenberg Bay Country Club	Plettenberg Bay
Rondebosch Golf Club	Cape Town
Royal Cape Golf Club	Cape Town
Simola Jack Nicklaus Signature Golf Course	Knysna
Somerset West Golf Club	Somerset West
Steenberg Golf Club	Cape Town
Stellenbosch Golf Club	Stellenbosch
Strand Golf Club	Strand
The Links (Fancourt)	George
Wellington Golf Club	Wellington
Westlake Golf Club	Cape Town
