= South African Open (golf) =

Golf tournament

Coordinates: 25.339275°S 27.106319°E

Investec South African Open Championship
Tournament information
- Location: Stellenbosch, South Africa
- Established: 1903
- Course: Stellenbosch Golf Club
- Par: 70
- Length: 7,213 yards (6,596 m)
- Tours: European Tour; Sunshine Tour; Asian Tour
- Format: Stroke play
- Prize fund: US$1,500,000
- Month played: February/March

Tournament record score
- Aggregate: 263 Branden Grace (2020)
- To par: −24 Ernie Els (2006)

Current champion
- (South Africa) Casey Jarvis

Final champion
- Location in South Africa Location in Western Cape

The South African Open is one of the oldest national open golf championships in the world, having first been played in 1903, and is one of the principal tournaments on the Southern-Africa-based Sunshine Tour. Since 1997 it has also been co-sanctioned by the European Tour.

== History ==
The first formal event was organised in 1903, following a series of exhibition matches that had been held over the preceding ten years. The championship was initially contested over just 36 holes until 1908, when it was extended to become a 72-hole tournament. Although non-whites had played in the South African Open before, most notably when Papwa Sewgolum finished second in 1963, it was not until 1972 that black golfers were allowed to compete.

From 2011 until February 2020 it was held in the Johannesburg area; twice at Serengeti Golf Club, followed by five times at Glendower Golf Club, and then twice at Randpark Golf Club. In December 2020 it will move away from Johannesburg and be held at Gary Player Country Club in Sun City.

Gary Player has been the most successful player in the tournament's history, with 13 victories over four decades between 1956 and 1981. Bobby Locke won nine titles, Sid Brews won eight titles, and George Fotheringham won the event five times as did Ernie Els.

In December 2018, the event became part of the Open Qualifying Series, giving up to three non-exempt players entry into The Open Championship.

The 2021 event was scheduled to be a co-sanctioned event between the European Tour and the Sunshine Tour. However due to COVID-19 travel restrictions in place in the UK from South Africa, the event was revised as a sole-sanctioned Sunshine Tour event.

== Flagship event ==
From 1999 to 2016, the tournament was the Sunshine Tour's flagship event for the purposes of the Official World Golf Ranking, earning a minimum of 32 OWGR points for the winner. It was replaced as the flagship event for 2017 by the Alfred Dunhill Championship before regaining its status the following year. In 2020, the Alfred Dunhill Championship once again replaced the South African Open as the tour's flagship event. In 2021, the Alfred Dunhill Championship was scheduled to be the flagship event for the second consecutive year. However due to the cancellation of the tournament, the South African Open regained its flagship event status for the first time since the January 2020 event.

== Winners ==
Sunshine Tour (Flagship event)	1999–2016, 2018–2020 (Jan), 2021
Sunshine Tour (Regular)	1972–1998, 2017, 2020 (Dec), 2022–
Pre-Sunshine Tour	1903–1971

#	Year	Tour(s) (Note: AFR − Sunshine Tour; ASA − Asian Tour; EUR − European Tour.)	Winner (Note: (a) – Amateur)	Score	To par	Margin of victory	Runner(s)-up	Venue	Ref.
Investec South African Open Championship
115th	2026	AFR, EUR	(South Africa) Casey Jarvis	266	−14	3 strokes	(South Africa) Hennie du Plessis (France) Frédéric Lacroix (Italy) Francesco Laporta	Stellenbosch	
114th	2025	AFR, EUR	(South Africa) Dylan Naidoo	202 (Note: Shortened to 54 holes due to rain.)	−14	Playoff	(England) Laurie Canter	Durban	
2024: No tournament due to rescheduling from December to March
113th	2023	AFR, EUR	(South Africa) Dean Burmester	277	−11	3 strokes	(Italy) Renato Paratore (Sweden) Jesper Svensson (South Africa) Ryan van Velzen	Blair Atholl	
112th	2022	AFR, EUR	(South Africa) Thriston Lawrence	272	−16	1 stroke	(France) Clément Sordet	Blair Atholl	
SA Open Championship
111th	2021	AFR, ~~EUR~~ (Note: Due to impending COVID-19 related travel restrictions in and out of South Africa affecting the makeup of the field, the event was removed from the European Tour schedule. It proceeded as a sole-sanctioned Sunshine Tour event.)	(South Africa) Daniel van Tonder	272	−16	1 stroke	(South Africa) Oliver Bekker	Gary Player	
South African Open
110th	2020 (Dec)	AFR, EUR	(South Africa) Christiaan Bezuidenhout	270	−18	5 strokes	(Wales) Jamie Donaldson	Gary Player	
109th	2020 (Jan)	AFR, EUR	(South Africa) Branden Grace	263	−21	3 strokes	(South Africa) Louis Oosthuizen	Randpark	
2019: No tournament due to rescheduling from December to January
108th	2018 (Dec)	AFR, ASA, EUR	(South Africa) Louis Oosthuizen	266	−18	6 strokes	(France) Romain Langasque	Randpark	
BMW SA Open
107th	2018 (Jan)	AFR, EUR	(England) Chris Paisley	267	−21	3 strokes	(South Africa) Branden Grace	Glendower	
106th	2017	AFR, EUR	(England) Graeme Storm	270	−18	Playoff (Note: Storm won with a par on the third hole of a sudden-death playoff.)	(Northern Ireland) Rory McIlroy	Glendower	
105th	2016	AFR, EUR	(South Africa) Brandon Stone	274	−14	2 strokes	(South Africa) Christiaan Bezuidenhout	Glendower	
South African Open Championship
104th	2015	AFR, EUR	(England) Andy Sullivan	277	−11	Playoff (Note: Sullivan won with a birdie on the first hole of a sudden-death playoff.)	(South Africa) Charl Schwartzel	Glendower	
2014: No tournament due to rescheduling from November to January
103rd	2013	AFR, EUR	(Denmark) Morten Ørum Madsen	269	−19	2 strokes	(South Africa) Jbe' Kruger (South Africa) Hennie Otto	Glendower	
SA Open Championship
102nd	2012	AFR, EUR	(Sweden) Henrik Stenson	271	−17	3 strokes	(South Africa) George Coetzee	Serengeti	
101st	2011	AFR, EUR	(South Africa) Hennie Otto	274	−14	1 stroke	(Austria) Bernd Wiesberger	Serengeti	
South African Open Championship
100th	2010	AFR, EUR	(South Africa) Ernie Els (5)	263 (Note: Unofficial scoring record as the 4th hole was unplayable during the 3rd and 4th rounds due to heavy rain. For scoring purposes, all players were deemed to have recorded a par for the hole.)	−25	1 stroke	(South Africa) Retief Goosen	Durban	
99th	2009	AFR, EUR	(Scotland) Richie Ramsay	275	−13	Playoff (Note: Ramsay won with a birdie on the first hole of a sudden-death playoff.)	(India) Shiv Kapur	Pearl Valley	
98th	2008	AFR, EUR	(South Africa) Richard Sterne	274	−14	Playoff (Note: Sterne won with a birdie on the first hole of a sudden-death playoff.)	(Northern Ireland) Gareth Maybin	Pearl Valley	
South African Airways Open
97th	2007	AFR, EUR	(South Africa) James Kingston	284	−4	1 stroke	(England) Oliver Wilson	Pearl Valley	
96th	2006	AFR, EUR	(South Africa) Ernie Els (4)	264	−24	3 strokes	(South Africa) Trevor Immelman	Humewood	
95th	2005 (Dec)	AFR, EUR	(South Africa) Retief Goosen (2)	282	−10	1 stroke	(South Africa) Ernie Els	Fancourt	
94th	2005 (Jan)	AFR, EUR	(South Africa) Tim Clark (2)	273	−15	6 strokes	(France) Grégory Havret (South Africa) Charl Schwartzel	Durban	
93rd	2004	AFR, EUR	(South Africa) Trevor Immelman (2)	276	−12	3 strokes	(Scotland) Alastair Forsyth (England) Steve Webster	Erinvale	
92nd	2003	AFR, EUR	(South Africa) Trevor Immelman	274	−14	Playoff (Note: Immelman won with a birdie on the first hole of a sudden-death playoff.)	(South Africa) Tim Clark	Erinvale	
Bell's South African Open
91st	2002	AFR, EUR	(South Africa) Tim Clark	269	−19	2 strokes	(England) Steve Webster	The Country Club	
Mercedes-Benz South African Open
90th	2001	AFR, EUR	(Zimbabwe) Mark McNulty (2)	280	−8	1 stroke	(England) Justin Rose	East London	
89th	2000	AFR, EUR	(Sweden) Mathias Grönberg	274	−14	1 stroke	(South Africa) Darren Fichardt (Argentina) Ricardo González (Zimbabwe) Nick Price	Randpark	
Mercedes-Benz - Vodacom South African Open
88th	1999	AFR, EUR	(South Africa) David Frost (2)	279	−5	1 stroke	(United States) Scott Dunlap (India) Jeev Milkha Singh	Stellenbosch	
South African Open
87th	1998	AFR, EUR	(South Africa) Ernie Els (3)	273	−15	3 strokes	(South Africa) David Frost	Durban	
86th	1997	AFR, EUR	(Fiji) Vijay Singh	270	−18	1 stroke	(Zimbabwe) Nick Price	Glendower	
Phillips South African Open
85th	1996	AFR	(South Africa) Ernie Els (2)	275	−13	1 stroke	(South Africa) Brenden Pappas	Royal Cape	
84th	1995	AFR	(South Africa) Retief Goosen	275	−13	5 strokes	(South Africa) Ernie Els	Randpark	
1994: No tournament due to rescheduling from December to January
83rd	1993 (Dec)	AFR	(Zimbabwe) Tony Johnstone (2)	267	−21	7 strokes	(South Africa) Ernie Els	Durban	
82nd	1993 (Feb)	AFR	(South Africa) Clinton Whitelaw	279	−9	2 strokes	(South Africa) Retief Goosen	Glendower	
Protea Assurance South African Open
81st	1992	AFR	(South Africa) Ernie Els	273	−15	3 strokes	(South Africa) Derek James	Houghton	
80th	1991	AFR	(South Africa) Wayne Westner (2)	272	−16	4 strokes	(England) Mark James (Zimbabwe) Tony Johnstone	Durban	
79th	1990	AFR	(South West Africa) Trevor Dodds	285	−3	1 stroke	(United States) Hugh Royer III	Royal Cape	
78th	1989	AFR	(United States) Fred Wadsworth	278	−10	1 stroke	(United States) Tom Lehman	Glendower	
Southern Suns South African Open
77th	1988	AFR	(South Africa) Wayne Westner	275	−13	2 strokes	(England) Ian Mosey	Durban	
76th	1987	AFR	(Zimbabwe) Mark McNulty	278	−10	Playoff (Note: McNulty won on the second hole of a sudden-death playoff.)	(South Africa) Fulton Allem	Mowbray	
75th	1986	AFR	(South Africa) David Frost	275	−13	3 strokes	(Zimbabwe) Tony Johnstone	Royal Johannesburg	
South African Open
74th	1985	AFR	(South Africa) Gavan Levenson	280	−8	3 strokes	(South Africa) Phil Simmons	Royal Durban	
73rd	1984	AFR	(Zimbabwe) Tony Johnstone	274	−14	3 strokes	(South Africa) Fulton Allem	Houghton	
72nd	1983	AFR	(United States) Charlie Bolling	278	−10	1 stroke	(South Africa) Tertius Claassens	Royal Cape	
1982: No tournament due to rescheduling from December to January
Datsun South African Open
71st	1981	AFR	(South Africa) Gary Player (13)	272	−16	Playoff (Note: Player defeated Bland with a birdie on the third hole of sudden-death after both had tied with 2 under-par 70s after an 18-hole playoff; Humphreys returned a level-par 72 in the playoff.)	(South Africa) John Bland (England) Warren Humphreys	Royal Johannesburg	
70th	1980	AFR	(South Africa) Bobby Cole (2)	279	−9	4 strokes	(Zimbabwe) Mark McNulty	Durban	
British Airways/Yellow Pages South African Open
69th	1979	AFR	(South Africa) Gary Player (12)	279	−9	1 stroke	(England) Ian Mosey	Houghton	
Yellow Pages South African Open
68th	1978	AFR	(South Africa) Hugh Baiocchi	285	−3	1 stroke	(South Africa) Gavan Levenson	Mowbray	
67th	1977	AFR	(South Africa) Gary Player (11)	273	−15	3 strokes	(South Africa) Bobby Cole (South Africa) Dale Hayes	Royal Johannesburg	
66th	1976 (Nov)	AFR	(South Africa) Gary Player (10)	280	−8	6 strokes	(South Africa) David Suddards (a) (South Africa) Bobby Verwey	Durban	
BP South African Open
65th	1976 (Jan)	AFR	(South Africa) Dale Hayes	287	−1	Playoff (Note: Hayes won following an 18-hole playoff; Hayes 69, Fourie 72.)	(South Africa) John Fourie	Houghton	
64th	1975	AFR	(South Africa) Gary Player (9)	278	−10	6 strokes	(South Africa) Allan Henning	Mowbray	
South African Open
63rd	1974	AFR	(South Africa) Bobby Cole	272	−16	4 strokes	(South Africa) Allan Henning	Royal Johannesburg	
BP South African Open
62nd	1973	AFR	(New Zealand) Bob Charles	282	−6	3 strokes	(South Africa) Vin Baker (South Africa) Bobby Cole (Australia) Graham Marsh	Durban	
South African Open
61st	1972	AFR	(South Africa) Gary Player (8)	274	−18	1 stroke	(South Africa) Bobby Cole	Royal Johannesburg	
60th	1971		(Rhodesia) Simon Hobday	276	−12	1 stroke	(South Africa) Gary Player	Mowbray	
59th	1970		(England) Tommy Horton	285		3 strokes	(South Africa) Terry Westbrook	Royal Durban	
58th	1969		(South Africa) Gary Player (7)	273		6 strokes	(South Africa) Trevor Wilkes	Durban	
57th	1968		(South Africa) Gary Player (6)	274		7 strokes	(South Africa) Cobie Legrange	Houghton	
56th	1967		(South Africa) Gary Player (5)	279		3 strokes	(South Africa) Allan Henning (England) Mike Hoyle	East London	
55th	1966		(South Africa) Gary Player (4)	278		1 stroke	(South Africa) Harold Henning (South Africa) Cobie Legrange	Houghton	
54th	1965		(South Africa) Gary Player (3)	273		3 strokes	(South Africa) John Hayes	Royal Cape	
1964: No tournament due to two events in 1963
53rd	1963 (Dec)		(South Africa) Allan Henning	278		2 strokes	(South Africa) Bruce Keyter	Bloemfontein	
52nd	1963 (Mar)		(South Africa) Retief Waltman (2)	281		1 stroke	(South Africa) Sewsunker Sewgolum	Durban	
51st	1962		(South Africa) Harold Henning (2)	285		1 stroke	(South Africa) Denis Hutchinson	Houghton	
50th	1961		(South Africa) Retief Waltman	289		8 strokes	(South Africa) Barry Franklin (a)	East London	
49th	1960		(South Africa) Gary Player (2)	280		7 strokes	(South Africa) Harold Henning (South Africa) Tommy Trevena	Mowbray	
48th	1959		(South Africa) Denis Hutchinson (a)	282		1 stroke	(South Africa) Gary Player	Royal Johannesburg	
47th	1958		(South Africa) Arthur Stewart (a)	281		1 stroke	(South Africa) Bobby Locke	Bloemfontein	
46th	1957		(South Africa) Harold Henning	289		Playoff (Note: Henning won the 36-hole playoff with a score of 144 to Guthrie's 146.)	(South Africa) Sandy Guthrie	Humewood	
45th	1956		(South Africa) Gary Player	286		3 strokes	(South Africa) Bruce Keyter	Durban	
44th	1955		(South Africa) Bobby Locke (9)	283		1 stroke	(South Africa) Reg Taylor	Zwartkop	
43rd	1954		(South Africa) Reg Taylor (a)	289		2 strokes	(South Africa) Jannie le Roux (a)	East London	
42nd	1953		(South Africa) Jimmy Boyd (a)	302		Playoff (Note: Boyd won the 36-hole playoff with a score of 162 to Hayes 163.)	(South Africa) Otway Hayes	Royal Cape	
41st	1952		(South Africa) Sid Brews (8)	305		1 stroke	(South Africa) Sandy Guthrie	Humewood	
40th	1951		(South Africa) Bobby Locke (8)	277		9 strokes	(South Africa) Jimmy Boyd (a) (Republic of Ireland) Harry Bradshaw	Houghton	
39th	1950		(South Africa) Bobby Locke (7)	280		11 strokes	(South Africa) Sandy Guthrie	Durban	
38th	1949		(South Africa) Sid Brews (7)	291		3 strokes	(South Africa) Eric Moore	Maccauvlei	
37th	1948		(South Africa) Mickey Janks (a)	298		Playoff (Note: Janks won the 36-hole playoff with a score of 147 to Guthrie's 153.)	(South Africa) Sandy Guthrie	East London	
36th	1947		(South Africa) Ronnie Glennie (a)	293		1 stroke	(South Africa) Eric Moore	Mowbray	
35th	1946		(South Africa) Bobby Locke (6)	285		14 strokes	Steve Boshoff (a)	Royal Johannesburg	
1941–1945: No tournament due to World War II
34th	1940		(South Africa) Bobby Locke (5)	293		10 strokes	Steve Boshoff (a)	Port Elizabeth	
33rd	1939		(South Africa) Bobby Locke (4)	279		8 strokes	Maurice Bodmer (a) (South Africa) Clarence Olander (a)	Durban	
32nd	1938		(South Africa) Bobby Locke (3)	279		5 strokes	(South Africa) Sid Brews	Maccauvlei	
31st	1937		(South Africa) Bobby Locke (a) (2)	288		11 strokes	(South Africa) Clarence Olander (a)	East London	
30th	1936		(South Africa) Clarence Olander (a)	297		Playoff (Note: Olander won the 36-hole playoff with a score of 146 to Robertson's 151.)	J Robertson	Royal Cape	
29th	1935		(South Africa) Bobby Locke (a)	296		3 strokes	Jock Verwey (a)	Parkview	
28th	1934		(South Africa) Sid Brews (6)	319		7 strokes	Jock Verwey (a)	Humewood	
27th	1933		(South Africa) Sid Brews (5)	297		3 strokes	(England) Charles McIlvenny	Maccauvlei	
26th	1932		(England) Charles McIlvenny	304		4 strokes	(England) Bob Grimsdell	Mowbray	
25th	1931		(South Africa) Sid Brews (4)	302		3 strokes	(England) Bob Grimsdell (England) Charles McIlvenny	Port Elizabeth	
24th	1930		(South Africa) Sid Brews (3)	297		11 strokes	(South Africa) Jock Brews	East London	
23rd	1929		(Scotland) Archie Tosh	315		1 stroke	(South Africa) Jock Brews	Royal Cape	
22nd	1928		(South Africa) Jock Brews (4)	297		1 stroke	(South Africa) Sid Brews	Durban	
21st	1927		(South Africa) Sid Brews (2)	301		5 strokes	(England) Bert Elkin (England) Charles McIlvenny	Maccauvlei	
20th	1926		(South Africa) Jock Brews (3)	301		9 strokes	(England) Bert Elkin	Port Elizabeth	
19th	1925		(South Africa) Sid Brews	295		3 strokes	(South Africa) Jock Brews	Johannesburg	
18th	1924		(England) Bert Elkin	316		9 strokes	(South Africa) Jock Brews (South Africa) Sid Brews	Durban	
17th	1923		(South Africa) Jock Brews (2)	315		1 stroke	(Scotland) Archie Tosh	Royal Cape	
16th	1922		(South Africa) Fred Jangle	310		7 strokes	(South Africa) Jock Brews	Port Alfred	
15th	1921		(South Africa) Jock Brews	316		3 strokes	(Scotland) Archie Tosh	Port Elizabeth	
14th	1920		(Scotland) Laurie Waters (4)	302		2 strokes	(England) Bert Elkin	Johannesburg	
13th	1919		(England) William Horne	320		9 strokes	(Scotland) Hugh Gordon Stewart (a)	Durban	
1915–1918: No tournament due to World War I
12th	1914		(Scotland) George Fotheringham (5)	299		20 strokes	(South Africa) Jock Brews	Royal Cape	
11th	1913		(Scotland) Jimmy Prentice (a)	304		2 strokes	(Scotland) Willie Binnie (Scotland) Jack Fotheringham	Kimberley	
10th	1912		(Scotland) George Fotheringham (4)	305		10 strokes	(Scotland) Laurie Waters	Potchefstroom	
9th	1911		(Scotland) George Fotheringham (3)	301		11 strokes	(Scotland) David Guthrie	Durban	
8th	1910		(Scotland) George Fotheringham (2)	315		5 strokes	(England) Arthur Gray	Royal Cape	
7th	1909		(Scotland) Jack Fotheringham	306		2 strokes	(Scotland) George Fotheringham	Potchefstroom	
6th	1908		(Scotland) George Fotheringham	294		9 strokes	(Scotland) Laurie Waters	Port Elizabeth	
5th	1907		(Scotland) Laurie Waters (3)	147 (Note: Some sources have Waters score as 146.)		5 strokes	(Scotland) Walter Day Jr	Kimberley	
4th	1906		(England) Arthur Gray (2)	151		3 strokes	H. F. Watson (a)	East London	
3rd	1905		(England) Arthur Gray			Playoff (Note: Gray won the playoff by a stroke with a score of 151.)	(Scotland) George Fotheringham	Garrison Club	
2nd	1904		(Scotland) Laurie Waters (2)	143		4 strokes	(England) Arthur Gray	Johannesburg	
1st	1903		(Scotland) Laurie Waters	163		3 strokes	J. W. Stewart	Port Elizabeth	

== See also ==
- Open golf tournament
