= 2020 Sunshine Ladies Tour =

7th season of the Sunshine Ladies Tour

2020 Sunshine Ladies Tour season
- Duration: January 2020 – October 2020
- Number of official events: 9
- Most wins: 2: (South Africa) Leján Lewthwaite
- Order of Merit winner: (South Africa) Monique Smit

The 2020 Sunshine Ladies Tour was the 7th season of the Sunshine Ladies Tour, a series of professional golf tournaments for women based in South Africa.

== Schedule ==
The season consisted of 9 events, all held in South Africa, played as a block between January and March, with one event in October. Seven events counted towards the Investec Order of Merit, the Canon Serengeti Par-3 Challenge was a new event on the schedule.

Date	Tournament	Venue	Winner	Purse (ZAR)	Notes
Jan 29	Cape Town Ladies Open	King David Mowbray Golf Club	(South Africa) Lee-Anne Pace	200,000	
Feb 4	SuperSport Ladies Challenge	Gary Player Country Club	(South Africa) Leján Lewthwaite	400,000	
Feb 14	Dimension Data Ladies Pro-Am	George Golf Club (R1 & R2); Fancourt - Outeniqua (R3)	(South Africa) Leján Lewthwaite (India) S Nicollet & N Taylor	700,000; 100,000	
Feb 19	South African Women's Masters	San Lameer Country Club	(Scotland) Jane Turner	250,000	
Feb 22	Canon Serengeti Par-3 Challenge	Serengeti Par-3 Course	(South Africa) Nicole Garcia	150,000	Limited field event; unofficial money (Note: Field of 24.)
Feb 26	Joburg Ladies Open	Soweto Country Club	(South Africa) Monique Smit	500,000	
Mar 4	Jabra Ladies Classic	Glendower Golf Club	(South Africa) Ashleigh Buhai	600,000	
Mar 12	Investec South African Women's Open	Westlake Golf Club	(England) Alice Hewson	€200,000	Co-sanctioned with the LET
Oct 28	Investec Royal Swazi (Ladies)	Gary Player Country Club	(South Africa) Casandra Hall	200,000	Limited field event; unofficial money (Note: Field of 6 compete alongside the men in this Sunshine Tour event for a separate purse.)

== Order of Merit ==
This shows the leaders in the final Order of Merit.

Rank	Player	Points
1	(South Africa) Monique Smit	2,207
2	(South Africa) Stacy Bregman	1,965
3	(South Africa) Leján Lewthwaite	1,761
4	(Scotland) Jane Turner	1,392
5	(Eswatini) Nobuhle Dlamini	1,168
