= Royal Cape Golf Club =

Oldest golf club in Africa

Coordinates: 34.015°S 18.49°E

- Location in South Africa

Club information
- Location: Cape Town, South Africa
- Established: 1885
- Type: Public
- Tota holes: 18
- Tournaments: Cape Town Open; Cape Town Ladies Open
- Website: royalcapegolf.co.za
- Designed by: Charles Murray
- Par: 72
- Length: 6,121 m
- Course rating: 70

The Royal Cape Golf Club in Cape Town, South Africa was established in 1885 and is the oldest golf club in Africa.

== History ==
Royal Cape is South Africa's oldest and traditionally most prestigious course, set to the backdrop of Cape Town's Table Mountain and Devil's Peak. The club began on the 14th of November 1885, established by Lt Gen Sir Henry D'Oyley Torrens only days after he arrived in the Cape Colony, soon to serve as acting Governor. A rough first 9-hole course was completed on Waterloo Green at the Wynberg Military Camp and presented the first monthly medal contest in 1886, won by the Torrens himself with a gross of 94.

The club was granted Royal status by King George V in 1910 in commemoration of the visit of the Duke of Connaught, who represented the king at the opening of the first Union of South Africa parliament.

== Course ==
The 6,121 meter course is a par 72 parklands style course built on relatively flat terrain, exposed to the Cape Doctor, the Cape's famous persistent and dry south-easterly wind that blows on the coast from spring to late summer (September to March).

== Tournaments hosted ==
In addition to the Cape Town Open (since 2012) and the Cape Town Ladies Open (since 2015), the club has hosted a number of high-profile professional and amateur tournaments. In 1910, the club played host to the South African Open Championship for the first time and hosted the tournament ten times between 1910 and 1996. Past winners include Gary Player, Ernie Els, Mark McNulty and Trevor Immelman.

=== Professional ===
Year	Tournament	Tour	Winner
2002	Vodacom Players Championship	2002–03 Sunshine Tour	(Zimbabwe) Mark McNulty
2001	Vodacom Players Championship	2001–02 Sunshine Tour	(South Africa) Ernie Els
2000	Vodacom Players Championship	2000–01 Sunshine Tour	(South Africa) Trevor Immelman
1999	Vodacom Players Championship	1999–2000 Southern Africa Tour	(South Africa) Nic Henning
1996	South African Open Championship	1996–97 Southern Africa Tour	(South Africa) Ernie Els
1990	South African Open Championship	1990–91 Southern Africa Tour	(Namibia) Trevor Dodds
1983	South African Open Championship	1983–84 Southern Africa Tour	(United States) Charlie Bolling
1965	South African Open Championship		(South Africa) Gary Player
1953	South African Open Championship		(South Africa) Jimmy Boyd
1936	South African Open Championship		(South Africa) Clarence Olander (a)
1929	South African Open Championship		(Scotland) Archie Tosh
1923	South African Open Championship		(South Africa) Jock Brews
1914	South African Open Championship		(Scotland) George Fotheringham
1910	South African Open Championship		(Scotland) George Fotheringham

=== Amateur ===
Year	Tournament	Winner
1994	South African Amateur Championship	(South Africa) Bradford Vaughan
1985	South African Amateur Championship	(South Africa) N. Clarke
1953	South African Amateur Championship	(South Africa) R. Brews
1936	South African Amateur Championship	(South Africa) Clarence Olander
1929	South African Amateur Championship	(South Africa) C. Hunter
1923	South African Amateur Championship	(South Africa) W.C.E. Stent
1914	South African Amateur Championship	(South Africa) S.M. MacPherson

== See also ==
- List of golf clubs granted Royal status
- Timeline of golf history (1851–1945)
