= Arthur Gray (golfer) =

English golfer (1879–1916)

Personal information
- Full name: Arthur George Gray
- Nationality: England
- Born: 1879 Climping, Sussex, England
- Died: 18 November 1916 (aged 36–37) Somme, France

Career
- Sport: Golf
- Status: Professional
- Professional wins: 2

Best results in major championships
- PGA Championship: DNP
- U.S. Open: DNP
- The Open Championship: T48: 1912

Arthur George Gray (1879 – 18 November 1916) was an English professional golfer who played in the early 20th century. He was professional at Port Elizabeth Golf Club from about 1904 to 1910 and won the South African Open in 1905 and 1906. He was killed during World War I.

== Early life ==
Gray was born in Climping, Sussex, in 1879. Littlehampton golf club was in Climping parish where Gray learnt his golf. Five of Arthur's brothers were also professional golfers. His older brother Ernest finished tied for 5th in the 1905 Open Championship.

== Golf career ==
Gray played in the 1899 and 1900 Open Championships with little success, failing to make the cut on both occasions. At this time he was the professional at Surbiton golf club. He was still at Surbiton when he played in the first Tooting Bec Cup in 1901. By 1903 he was professional at Gravesend golf club when he competed in the first News of the World Matchplay. In the 36-hole southern section qualifying tournament he scored 146 to take one of the 16 qualifying places in an entry of 78. In the final stages he won his first round match before losing 2&1 to J.H. Taylor in the last-16 round.

Gray then moved to South Africa, becoming the professional at Port Elizabeth golf club. He played in the South African Open from 1904 to 1910, winning the event in 1905 and 1906 and being runner-up in 1904 and 1910.

Soon after returning from South Africa, Gray played in the 1910 Open Championship while at Littlehampton golf club. In 1911 he became the professional at Colchester golf club. In the Open Championship that year he qualified but missed the cut by a single stroke. In the 1912 Championship he made the cut and finished in a tie for 48th place.

== Death ==
Gray was injured during the Battle of the Somme and died of his wounds in France.
