= James Prentice =

James Prentice may refer to:

- James D. Prentice (1899–1979), Royal Navy and Royal Canadian Navy officer
- James Douglas Prentice (1861–1911), Scottish-born rancher and political figure in British Columbia
- Jim Prentice (1956–2016), Canadian politician
- Jim Prentice (footballer) (born 1949), Australian rules footballer
- Jimmy Prentice (1885–1915), Scottish amateur golfer
