= Retief Waltman =

South African golfer and missionary

Personal information
- Nationality: South Africa
- Born: 1938–39 (age 86–88)

Career
- Sport: Golf
- Status: Professional
- Former tour: South African Tour
- Professional wins: 6

Number of wins by tour
- European Tour: 1
- Sunshine Tour: 5

Best results in major championships
- Masters Tournament: CUT: 1959, 1964
- PGA Championship: DNP
- U.S. Open: DNP
- The Open Championship: DNP

Retief Waltman (born 1938–39) is a former South African professional golfer and is a Christian missionary.

== Professional career ==
Waltman started his career as an assistant professional Pretoria Country Club. He showed promise as a teenager and, at the age of 18, beat Bobby Locke in the first round of the 1957 South African Professional Match Play Championship. His victory was referred to as "one of the greatest surprises in South African golf for several years." Waltman was an unknown teenager and Locke was considered one of the best golfers in the world and would go on to win the British Open four months later.

Waltman won his first big tournament, the 1961 South African Open, by an extraordinary eight shots. Two years later he would win the event again by shot over colored golfer Sewsunker Sewgolum. In addition to these triumphs he won multiple other events on the South African circuit and the 1963 Dutch Open.

=== Missionary work ===
Waltman was considered a "potential superstar" but abruptly quit golf at the age of 25 after completing the 1964 Masters Tournament. Waltman stated, "I wanted a purpose for my life. I was devoting my whole life to a game. Being so involved in golf limited me. Man is his own biggest enemy." The golf commentator Henry Longhurst elaborated, "Gradually the sheer materialism of this form of life and the unceasing emphasis on money began to sicken him, as it must have done so many before him. The difference was that he did not threaten to give it up. He just gave it up." He became a Christian missionary. As of 2006, he was still a missionary. He survived three knife attacks during his work.

== Personal life ==
The future professional golfer Retief Goosen is named after Waltman.

== Professional wins ==
=== South African circuit wins (5) ===
- 1958 Cock of the North
- 1961 South African Open
- 1963 South African Open, Transvaal Open
- 1964 Western Province Open

=== European circuit win (1) ===
- 1963 Dutch Open

== Team appearances ==
- Canada Cup (representing South Africa): 1961, 1963
