= Cock o' the North (golf) =

Golf tournament in Zambia

Cock of The North
Tournament information
- Location: Ndola, Zambia
- Established: 1954
- Course: Ndola Golf Club
- Par: 73
- Length: 7,079 yards (6,473 m)
- Tours: Sunshine Tour; Safari Circuit
- Format: Stroke play
- Prize fund: R 100,000
- Month played: March
- Final year: 2001

Tournament record score
- Aggregate: 272 Harold Henning (1956)
- To par: −11 Eamonn Darcy (1981)

Final champion
- (Zimbabwe) Sean Farrell
- Location in Zambia

The Cock of The North was a golf tournament held in Zambia. It was part of the Sunshine Tour in 2000 and 2001. The tournament was founded in 1954 and was held at the Ndola Golf Club in Ndola.

Founded in 1954, the tournament was held annually until 1977, when the European Tournament Players Division took over running of the Safari Circuit. It was then only held every other year, alternating on the schedule with the Mufulira Open, until 1985, although it was incorporated with the Zambia Open in 1977 and 1979, and not held in 1983. The tournament was revived in 2000 as part of the Sunshine Tour, before being cancelled in 2002 due to lack of sponsorship.

Note: The records from the Ndola Golf Club show that Craig Defoy, Sam Torrance, Tommy Horton, and Brian Barnes won the tournament in 1972, 1975, 1977, and 1979 respectively. However, in those years the Zambia Open was held at the Ndola Golf Club and there was no separate Cock o' the North tournament.

== Winners ==
Year	Tour (Note: AFR − Sunshine Tour; SAF − Safari Circuit.)	Winner	Score	To par	Margin of victory	Runner(s)-up	Ref.
2001	AFR	(Zimbabwe) Sean Farrell	209	−10	4 strokes	(South Africa) Graeme van der Nest	
2000	AFR	(South Africa) Titch Moore	217	−2	1 stroke	(South Africa) Brett Liddle (Republic of Ireland) James Loughnane (South Africa) John Mashego (South Africa) Grant Muller	
1986–1999: No tournament
1985	SAF	(England) Brian Waites	283	−9	1 stroke	(England) Gary Cullen (England) Malcolm Gregson	
1982–1984: No tournament
1981	SAF	(Republic of Ireland) Eamonn Darcy	281	−11	1 stroke	(England) Carl Mason	
1977–1980: No tournament
1976		(Australia) Jack Newton	282	−10	3 strokes	(England) Pip Elson	
1975: No tournament
1974		(England) Malcolm Gregson	284	−8	Playoff	(Australia) Jack Newton	
1973		(England) Mike Ingham (2)	284	−8	2 strokes	(England) Maurice Bembridge (England) Peter Tupling	
1972: No tournament
1971		(England) Mike Ingham	285				
1970		(Wales) Craig Defoy	284		2 strokes	(Scotland) Bernard Gallacher	
1969		(Scotland) Bernard Gallacher	280				
1968		(South Africa) Terry Westbrook (3)	291				
1967		(South Africa) Terry Westbrook (2)	145				
1966		(South Africa) Terry Westbrook	139				
1965: No tournament
1964		(South Africa) Sewsunker Sewgolum	283				
1963		(South Africa) Denis Hutchinson (2)	276				
1962		(South Africa) Denis Hutchinson	295				
1961		(United States) Frank G. Coleman (a)	148				
1960		(South Africa) Pierre Oosthuizen	287				
1959		(South Africa) Harold Henning (2)	290				
1958		(South Africa) Retief Waltman	278				
1957		(South Africa) Sandy Guthrie	289				
1956		(South Africa) Harold Henning	272				
1955		(South Africa) Tommy Trevenna	291				
1954		(Northern Ireland) Harry Middleton	215				
