= South African Amateur Championship (golf) =

Golf tournament

The South African Amateur Championship is an annual amateur golf tournament in South Africa.

== History ==
The first tournament was held from 26 September to 1 October 1892. It was held at Kimberley Golf Club as part of the Kimberley Exhibition. It was entitled the "South African Championship." It was a match play event. Pat Grant was the favorite but was defeated by Denholm Walker in the early rounds. Walker ultimately won the championship, defeating H.J. Mackay 1 up in the finals. The second event was held at Port Elizabeth Golf Course and referred to as the SA Tournament. The format changed from match play to stroke play. D.G. Proudfoot won the tournament. It was his first of many victories in the event.

In recent years the event has usually been held in February.

== Winners ==
| Year | Champion | Score | Runner(s)-up | Venue | Ref. |
|---|---|---|---|---|---|
| 2024 | (Scotland) Gregor Graham | 4 & 2 | (South Africa) Jordan Burnand | Royal Johannesburg & Kensington | |
| 2023 | (France) Martin Couvra | 3 up | (South Africa) Kyle De Beer | Mount Edgecombe Country Club Estate | |
| 2022 | (South Africa) Kyle De Beer | 4 & 2 | (Scotland) Rory Franssen | Royal Johannesburg & Kensington | |
| 2021 | (South Africa) Christiaan Maas | 3 & 2 | (South Africa) Christopher Dyer | Royal Johannesburg & Kensington | |
| 2020 | (South Africa) Casey Jarvis | 7 & 6 | (South Africa) James Wilson | Royal Johannesburg & Kensington | |
| 2019 | (South Africa) Wilco Nienaber | 1 up | (South Africa) Jordan Duminy | King David Mowbray Golf Club | |
| 2018 | (South Africa) Deon Germishuys | 39th hole | (South Africa) Chris Woollam | Durban Country Club | |
| 2017 | (South Africa) Christo Lamprecht | 7 & 6 | (South Africa) Caylum Boon | Humewood Golf Club | |
| 2016 | (Scotland) Craig Ross | 3 & 1 | (South Africa) Dylan Naidoo | George Golf Club | |
| 2015 | (Scotland) Daniel Young | 8 & 6 | (South Africa) Jovan Rebula | Silver Lakes | |
| 2014 | (South Africa) Thriston Lawrence | 5 & 4 | (South Africa) Altin van der Merwe | Hermanus | |
| 2013 | (South Africa) Thriston Lawrence | 9 & 8 | (South Africa) Andrew Light | Country Club JHB | |
| 2012 | (Scotland) Brian Soutar | 2 & 1 | (South Africa) Brandon Stone | Mowbray Golf Club | |
| 2011 | (Scotland) Michael Stewart | 5 & 4 | (Scotland) Paul Shields | Vaal de Grace | |
| 2010 | (England) Laurie Canter | 6 & 5 | (South Africa) Allan Versfeld | East London Golf Club | |
| 2009 | (South Africa) Ryan Dreyer | 5 & 3 | (South Africa) Adrian Ford | Benoni Country Club | |
| 2008 | (South Africa) Jacques Blaauw | 6 & 5 | (Wales) Nigel Edwards | Royal Durban Golf Club | |
| 2007 | (South Africa) Louis de Jager | 5 & 4 | (South Africa) Andre de Decker | Humewood Golf Club | |
| 2006 | (Wales) Nigel Edwards | 2 up | (Australia) Won Joon Lee | De Zalze & Stellenbosch | |
| 2005 | (South Africa) George Coetzee | 5 & 3 | (South Africa) Hertzog Landman | Wingate Park Country Club | |
| 2004 | (South Africa) Hennie Rootman | 4 & 3 | (South Africa) Billy Valentyn | Paarl Golf Club | |
| 2003 | (South Africa) Anton Haig | 8 & 7 | (South Africa) Jake Roos | Roodepoort Country Club | |
| 2002 | (South Africa) Rossouw Loubser | 1 up | (South Africa) Grant Veenstra | George Golf Course | |
| 2001 | (England) David Dixon | 1 up | (South Africa) Dean Lambert | Oppenheimer Park | |
| 2000 | (South Africa) Jaco van Zyl | 8 & 6 | (South Africa) Dean Lambert | East London | |
| 1999 | (South Africa) Richard Sterne | 3 & 2 | (South Africa) Jaco Olver | Westlake | |
| 1998 | (South Africa) Jean Hugo | 4 & 3 | (South Africa) Ryan Reid | Mount Edgecombe Country Club | |
| 1997 | (South Africa) Trevor Immelman | 2 & 1 | (New Zealand) David Somervaille | Humewood | |
| 1996 | (South Africa) Titch Moore | 8 & 7 | (South Africa) Martin Maritz | Benoni Country Club | |
| 1995 | (South Africa) Warren Abery | 1 up | (South Africa) Jean Hugo | Schoeman Park | |
| 1994 | (South Africa) Bradford Vaughan | 8 & 7 | (South Africa) Derrick Deans | Royal Cape | |
| 1993 | (Zimbabwe) Lewis Chitengwa | 4 & 2 | (South Africa) Hugo Lombard | East London | |
| 1992 | (South Africa) Bradley Davidson | 7 & 6 | (South Africa) Tim Clark | Royal Durban | |
| 1991 | (South Africa) Desvonde Botes | 3 & 1 | (South Africa) Barry Sundelson | Royal Johannesburg | |
| 1990 | (South Africa) Retief Goosen | 2 & 1 | (South Africa) D. Smith | Port Elizabeth | |
| 1989 | (South Africa) Craig Rivett | 38th hole | (South Africa) Ernie Els | Maritzburg Country Club | |
| 1988 | (South Africa) Neville Clarke | 40th hole | (South Africa) Ernie Els | Oppenheimer Park | |
| 1987 | (South Africa) Ben Fouchee | 1 up | (South Africa) Ernie Els | Glendower | |
| 1986 | (South Africa) Ernie Els | 5 & 3 | (South Africa) Tony Louw | East London | |
| 1985 | (South Africa) Neville Clarke | 3 & 1 | (South Africa) Duncan Lindsay-Smith | Royal Cape | |
| 1984 | (South Africa) M. Wiltshire | 3 & 1 | (South Africa) Peter Van Der Riet | Humewood | |
| 1983 | (Taiwan) Yuan Ching-chi | 6 & 5 | (South Africa) David Suddards | Royal Durban | |
| 1982 | (South Africa) Neil James | 37th hole | (South Africa) Duncan Lindsay-Smith | East London | |
| 1981 | (South Africa) David Suddards | 2 & 1 | (South Africa) David Frost | Oppenheimer Park | |
| 1980 | (South Africa) Etienne Groenewald | 9 & 8 | (South Africa) David Suddards | Royal Johannesburg | |
| 1979 | (South Africa) Louis Norval | 5 & 4 | (South Africa) W. Branthwaite | Humewood | |
| 1978 | (Rhodesia) Teddy Webber | 3 & 2 | (South Africa) Etienne Groenewald | Durban Country Club | |
| 1977 | (Rhodesia) Teddy Webber | 37th hole | (South Africa) Richter Van Niekerk | Bryanston Country Club | |
| 1976 | (South Africa) Russell Kotzen | 8 & 7 | (South Africa) George Schwartzel | Mowbray | |
| 1975 | (South Africa) Peter Vorster | 3 & 2 | (South Africa) J. Diniz | Bloemfontein | |
| 1974 | (South Africa) Trevor Lagerwey | 1 up | (South Africa) Neville Sundelson | Port Elizabeth | |
| 1973 | (South Africa) Andries Oosthuizen | 3 & 2 | (South Africa) Coen Dreyer | Houghton | |
| 1972 | (South Africa) Neville Sundelson | 3 & 2 | (South Africa) R. Gouverneur | East London | |
| 1971 | (South Africa) Coen Dreyer | 6 & 5 | (South Africa) Kevin Suddards | Durban Country Club | |
| 1970 | (South Africa) Hugh Baiocchi | 37th hole | (South Africa) Roy Joubert | Mowbray | |
| 1969 | (South Africa) Derek Thornton | 2 & 1 | (South Africa) John Fourie | Humewood | |
| 1968 | (South Africa) Bob Williams | 5 & 3 | (South Africa) Reg Taylor | Bloemfontein | |
| 1967 | (South Africa) Derek Kemp | 7 & 6 | (South Africa) Rod Mullan | Royal Johannesburg | |
| 1966 | (South Africa) Comrie du Toit | 1 up | (South Africa) Brian Lefson | Mowbray | |
| 1965 | (South Africa) Peter Vorster | 7 & 6 | (South Africa) I. Dorrington | Humewood | |
| 1964 | (England) Richard Langridge | 1 up | (South Africa) Dorian Wharton-Hood | Bloemfontein | |
| 1963 | (South Africa) Dave Symons | 5 & 4 | (South Africa) John Hayes | Durban Country Club | |
| 1962 | (South Africa) John Hayes | 2 & 1 | (South Africa) Barry Franklin | Houghton | |
| 1961 | (South Africa) Jannie le Roux | 3 & 2 | (South Africa) John Hayes | East London | |
| 1960 | (South Africa) Murray Grindrod | 3 & 2 | (South Africa) Cobie Legrange | Mowbray | |
| 1959 | (South Africa) Arthur Walker | 11 & 10 | (South Africa) D. Muller | Royal Johannesburg | |
| 1958 | (South Africa) Jimmy Boyd | 5 & 4 | (South Africa) Arthur Walker | Bloemfontein | |
| 1957 | (South Africa) Arthur Stewart | 41st hole | (South Africa) Peter Vorster | Humewood | |
| 1956 | (South Africa) Reg Taylor | 37th hole | (South Africa) Arthur Walker | Durban Country Club | |
| 1955 | (South Africa) Bruce Keyter | 10 & 9 | (South Africa) N.K. Cowan | Zwartkop | |
| 1954 | (South Africa) Alan Jackson | 37th hole | (South Africa) Denis Hutchinson | East London | |
| 1953 | (South Africa) Roger Brews | 4 & 3 | (South Africa) Jimmy Boyd | Royal Cape | |
| 1952 | (South Africa) Mickey Janks | 2 & 1 | (South Africa) Ronnie Glennie | Humewood | |
| 1951 | (South Africa) Teddy Irwin | 4 & 3 | (South Africa) Mickey Janks | Houghton | |
| 1950 | (South Africa) Eric Dalton | 5 & 4 | (South Africa) Frank Agg | Durban Country Club | |
| 1949 | (South Africa) Ronnie Glennie | 3 & 2 | (South Africa) Jimmy Boyd | Maccauvlei | |
| 1948 | (South Africa) Ben Ryan | 3 & 2 | (South Africa) Christian Watermeyer | East London | |
| 1947 | (South Africa) Christian Watermeyer | 9 & 8 | (South Africa) Ben Ryan | Mowbray | |
| 1946 | (South Africa) Jimmy Boyd | 4 & 3 | (South Africa) Graham Packer | Royal Johannesburg | |
1941–1945: No tournament due to World War II
| 1940 | (South Africa) Jack Watermeyer | 5 & 4 | (South Africa) Rick Dorrington | Humewood | |
| 1939 | (South Africa) Otway Hayes | 3 & 1 | (South Africa) Christian Watermeyer | Durban Country Club | |
| 1938 | (South Africa) Bernard Wynne | 8 & 7 | (South Africa) Ben Ryan | Maccauvlei | |
| 1937 | (South Africa) Bobby Locke | 4 & 3 | (South Africa) Clarence Olander | East London | |
| 1936 | (South Africa) Clarence Olander | 4 & 3 | (South Africa) Maurice Bodmer | Royal Cape | |
| 1935 | (South Africa) Bobby Locke | 38th hole | (South Africa) Frank Agg | Parkview | |
| 1934 | (South Africa) Clarence Olander | 3 & 2 | (South Africa) Jack Watermeyer | Humewood | |
| 1933 | (South Africa) Bernard Wynne | 38th hole | (South Africa) L.M. Jacobs | Durban Country Club | |
| 1932 | (South Africa) Clarence Olander | 37th hole | (South Africa) Frank Agg | Royal Port Alfred | |
| 1931 | (South Africa) Charles Coetzer | 4 & 3 | (South Africa) Charles Hunter | E.R.P.M. | |
| 1930 | (South Africa) Bernard Wynne | 4 & 3 | (South Africa) Clarence Olander | East London | |
| 1929 | (South Africa) C. Hunter | 8 & 6 | (South Africa) P. Coetzer | Royal Cape | |
| 1928 | (South Africa) Bernard Wynne | 9 & 7 | (South Africa) R. Broadley | Durban Country Club | |
| 1927 | (South Africa) G.J. Chantler | 4 & 3 | (South Africa) E.J. Hunt | Maccauvlei | |
| 1926 | (South Africa) W.S. Bryant | 2 & 1 | (South Africa) W.C.E. Stent | Port Elizabeth | |
| 1925 | (South Africa) Tom McLelland | 2 & 1 | (South Africa) A.L. Forster | Johannesburg | |
Format change from stroke play to match play
| 1924 | (South Africa) A.L. Forster | 329 | (South Africa) P. McLeod (Note: McLeod finished as runner-up following a playoff with Hugh Gordon Stewart.) | Durban Country Club | |
| 1923 | (South Africa) W.C.E. Stent | 322 (Note: Stent defeated McMaster in a 36-hole playoff; Stent 155, McMaster 156.) | (South Africa) Humphrey McMaster | Royal Cape | |
| 1922 | (South Africa) W.C.E. Stent | 324 | (South Africa) L.P. Vernon | Royal Port Alfred | |
| 1921 | (South Africa) A.L. Forster | 322 | (Scotland) Hugh Gordon Stewart | Port Elizabeth | |
| 1920 | (Scotland) Hugh Gordon Stewart | 315 | (South Africa) A.L. Forster | Johannesburg | |
| 1919 | (Scotland) Hugh Gordon Stewart | 329 | (South Africa) A.L. Mandy | Durban | |
1915–1918: No tournament due to World War I
| 1914 | (Scotland) Stuart MacPherson | 324 | (South Africa) W.C.E. Stent | Royal Cape | |
| 1913 | (Scotland) Jimmy Prentice | 304 | (Scotland) Stuart MacPherson | Kimberley | |
| 1912 | (Scotland) Hugh Gordon Stewart | 326 | (South Africa) W.C.E. Stent | Potchefstroom | |
| 1911 | (Scotland) Jimmy Prentice | 318 | (South Africa) H.A. Biden | Durban | |
| 1910 | (South Africa) E.L. Steyn | 330 | (Scotland) Jimmy Prentice | Cape Golf Club | |
| 1909 | (Scotland) Jimmy Prentice | 321 | (Scotland) Hugh Gordon Stewart | Potchefstroom | |
| 1908 | (Scotland) Jimmy Prentice | 310 | (South Africa) Ben Wynne, (Scotland) Hugh Gordon Stewart | Port Elizabeth | |
| 1907 | (Scotland) Harry Miller Ballingall | 307 | (Scotland) Jimmy Prentice | Kimberley | |
| 1906 | (Scotland) Harry Miller Ballingall | 324 | (Scotland) Hugh Gunn | East London | |
| 1905 | (South Africa) H.C.V Nicholson | 322 | (Scotland) Hugh Gunn | Bloemfontein | |
| 1904 | (South Africa) J.R. Southey | 301 | (South Africa) F.H. Mitchell | Johannesburg | |
| 1903 | (South Africa) R. Law | 336 | (South Africa) Ben Wynne | Port Elizabeth | |
| 1902 | (South Africa) Douglas Proudfoot | 361 | | King William's Town | |
1900–1901: No tournament due to The Boer War
| 1899 | (South Africa) Douglas Proudfoot | 320 | | Kimberley | |
| 1898 | (South Africa) Douglas Proudfoot | | | East London | |
| 1897 | (South Africa) Douglas Proudfoot | | | Port Elizabeth | |
| 1896 | (South Africa) Douglas Proudfoot | | | King William's Town | |
| 1895 | (South Africa) Douglas Proudfoot | | | Port Elizabeth | |
| 1894 | (South Africa) Douglas Proudfoot | | | Port Elizabeth | |
| 1893 | (South Africa) Douglas Proudfoot | 168 | (South Africa) Graaff Reinet | Port Elizabeth | |
| 1892 | (South Africa) Denholm Walker | 1 up | (South Africa) H.J. Mackay | Kimberley | |

== Proudfoot Trophy ==
The Proudfoot Trophy was introduced in 1931. It was originally presented to he player with the best net score at the Inter-Centre Championship. However, it was later awarded to the medalist of the South African Amateur's qualifier.

| Year | Champion | Score | Venue |
|---|---|---|---|
| 2024 | (South Africa) Benjamin Webber | 135 | Royal Johannesburg & Kensington |
| 2023 | (France) Martin Couvra | 129 | Mount Edgecombe Country Club Estate |
| 2022 | (South Africa) Reece Mckain | 133 | Royal Johannesburg & Kensington |
| 2021 | (England) Jack Dyer | 133 | Royal Johannesburg & Kensington |
| 2020 | (South Africa) Samuel Simpson | 131 | Royal Johannesburg & Kensington |
| 2019 | (South Africa) Luca Filippi | 137 | King David Mowbray |
| 2018 | (Scotland) David Langley | 137 | Durban Country Club |
| 2017 | (South Africa) Chris Woollam | 129 | Humewood Golf Club |
| 2016 | (Scotland) Rory Franssen | 132 | George Golf Club |
| 2015 | (Scotland) Greig Marchbank | 138 | Silver Lakes |
| 2014 | (South Africa) Jovan Rebula | 136 | Hermanus Golf Club |
| 2013 | (South Africa) Haydn Porteous | 134 | Country Club Johannesburg |
| 2012 | (South Africa) Dylan Raubenheimer | 134 | Mowbray |
| 2011 | (South Africa) Brandon Stone | 142 | Vaal de Grace |
| 2010 | (England) Laurie Canter | 138 | East London Golf Club |
| 2009 | (France) Johann Lopez-Lazaro | 136 | Benoni Country Club |
| 2008 | (South Africa) Louis Calitz | 141 | Royal Durban |
| 2007 | (South Africa) Louis de Jager | 145 | Humewood Golf Club |
| 2006 | (Italy) Federico Colombo | 135 | De Zalze and Stellenbosch Golf Club |
| 2005 | (South Africa) Josh Cunliffe | 139 | Wingate Country Club |
| 2004 | (South Africa) Christiaan Basson | 136 | Paarl Golf Club |
| 2003 | (South Africa) Matthew Kent | 136 | Roodepoort Country Club |
| 2002 | (England) Gary Wolstenholme | 136 | George Golf Club |
| 2001 | (South Africa) D. Lambert | 129 | Oppenheimer Park Golf Club |
| 2000 | (Republic of Ireland) C. McMonagle | 144 | East London Golf Club |
| 1999 | (South Africa) D. Van der Merwe | 142 | Westlake Golf Club |
| 1998 | (South Africa) Trevor Immelman | 141 | Mount Edgecombe Country Club |
| 1997 | (South Africa) Ulrich van den Berg | 145 | Humewood Golf Club |
| 1996 | (Zimbabwe) G. Cayeux | 140 | Benoni Country Club |
| 1995 | (South Africa) Titch Moore | 139 | Schoeman Park |
| 1994 | (South Africa) N. Homann | 136 | Royal Cape Golf Club |
| 1993 | (South Africa) D. Kinnear | 145 | East London |
| 1992 | (South Africa) D. Stratton | 141 | Royal Durban Golf Club |
| 1991 | (South Africa) Nic Henning | 137 | Royal Johannesburg |
| 1990 | (South Africa) R. Fletcher | 140 | Port Elizabeth |
| 1989 | (South Africa) C. Davison | 141 | Maritzburg Country Club |
| 1988 | (South Africa) Ben Fouchee | 139 | Oppenheimer Park |
| 1987 | (South Africa) Ben Fouchee | 144 | Glendower Golf Club |
| 1986 | (Taiwan) Hsieh Chin-sheng | 142 | East London Golf Club |
| 1985 | (South Africa) D. Van Staden | 141 | Royal Cape Golf Club |
| 1984 | (South Africa) S. Collard | 143 | Humewood |
| 1983 | (Taiwan) C-H Yu | 142 | Royal Durban |
| 1982 | (Taiwan) Hsieh Yu-shu | 142 | East London |
| 1981 | (Taiwan) Yuan Ching-chi | 138 | Oppenheimer Park |
| 1980 | (South Africa) A. Van Straaten | 144 | Royal Johannesburg |
| 1979 | (Rhodesia) Tony Johnstone | 142 | Humewood |
| 1978 | (South Africa) Duncan Lindsay-Smith | 142 | Durban Country Club |
| 1977 | (South Africa) Peter Todt | 142 | Bryanston Country Club |
| 1976 | (Rhodesia) Mark McNulty | 141 | Mowbray |
| 1975 | (Brazil) Rafael Navarro | 139 | Bloemfontein |
| 1974 | (South Africa) Neville Sundelson | 144 | Port Elizabeth |
| 1973 | (South Africa) G. Harvey | 140 | Houghton |
| 1972 | (South Africa) W. Pitt | 145 | East London |
| 1971 | (South Africa) W. Pitt | 145 | Durban Country Club |
| 1970 | (South Africa) Dale Hayes | 144 | Mowbray |
| 1969 | (South Africa) B. McIntosh | 155 | Humewood |
| 1968 | (South Africa) Hugh Baiocchi | 143 | Bloemfontein |
| 1967 | (South Africa) Derek Kemp | 139 | Royal Johannesburg |
| 1966 | (South Africa) Bobby Cole | 142 | Mowbray |
| 1965 | (South Africa) Peter Vorster | 146 | Humewood |
| 1964 | (South Africa) A. Hofmann | 135 | Bloemfontein |
| 1963 | (South Africa) Jannie le Roux | 145 | Durban Country Club |
| 1962 | (South Africa) John Hayes | 138 | Houghton |
| 1961 | (South Africa) Bob Williams | 146 | East London |
| 1960 | (South Africa) Reg Taylor | 142 | Mowbray |
| 1959 | (South Africa) Jannie le Roux | 146 | Royal Johannesburg |
| 1958 | (South Africa) Arthur Walker & Jannie le Roux | 142 | Bloemfontein |
| 1957 | (South Africa) Basil Keartland | 149 | Humewood |
| 1956 | (South Africa) R.D.D. Evans | 150 | Durban Country Club |
| 1955 | (South Africa) Alan Jackson | 137 | Zwarthkop Country Club |
| 1954 | (South Africa) Denis Hutchinson | 141 | East London |
| 1953 | (South Africa) Denis Hutchinson | 145 | Royal Cape |
| 1952 | (South Africa) Basil Keartland | 149 | Humewood |
| 1951 | (South Africa) Mickey Janks | 148 | Houghton |
| 1950 | (South Africa) Eric Dalton | 148 | Durban Country Club |
| 1949 | (South Africa) A.J. McCracken | 142 | Maccauvlei |
| 1948 | (South Africa) Ben Ryan | 151 | East London |
| 1947 | (South Africa) Steve Boshoff | 147 | Mowbray |
| 1946 | (South Africa) Basil Keartland | 148 | Royal Johannesburg |
| 1941-45 | No tournament due to World War II | | |
| 1940 | (South Africa) Clarence Olander | 154 | Humewood |
| 1939 | (South Africa) Jack Watermeyer | 146 | Durban Country Club |
| 1938 | (South Africa) Steve Boshoff | 143 | Maccauvlei |
| 1937 | (South Africa) Bobby Locke | 137 | East London |
| 1936 | (South Africa) Jack Watermeyer | 148 | Royal Cape |
| 1935 | (South Africa) Bobby Locke | 130 | Parkview |
| 1934 | (South Africa) Clarence Olander | 154 | Humewood |
| 1933 | (South Africa) Ben Ryan | | Durban Country Club |
| 1932 | (South Africa) F.M. Bonder | 161 | Royal Port Alfred |
| 1931 | (South Africa) Clarence Olander | 149 | Royal Johannesburg |
