= Randpark Golf Club =

Golf club in South Africa

Randpark Golf Club is a golf club in Randburg, South Africa.

== Background ==
The club was founded 1940. It is located in Randpark, South Africa, a suburb of Randburg. The club has three courses: Bushwillow, Firethorn, and Creek 9. Bushwillow, then named Windsor 12, was completed in 1946. It was significantly renovated in 1952 by Bob Grimsdell. Firethorn was designed by Sid Brews. It opened in 1971. Firethorn is known to be the hardest course on the property.

Cobie Legrange worked as Randpark's club professional for many years.

In October 2020 it was announced the course would host the Joburg Open the following month. The event was played at Bushwillow course and won by Denmark's Joachim B. Hansen. It was an event on the European Tour. It was also an event on the Sunshine Tour.

== Tournaments hosted ==
- 2020 South African Open, European Tour and Sunshine Tour event
- 2020 Joburg Open, European Tour and Sunshine Tour event
- 2018 South African Open, European Tour and Sunshine Tour event
- 2000 South African Open, European Tour and Sunshine Tour event
- 1995 South African Open, Sunshine Tour event
- 1989 South African Seniors Classic
