= Sewsunker Sewgolum =

South African professional golfer

Sewsunker "Papwa" Sewgolum
Personal information
- Nationality: South Africa
- Born: 12 December 1928
- Died: 5 July 1978 (aged 49)
- Height: 5 ft 4 in (163 cm)
- Spouse: Suminthra
- Children: 5

Career
- Sport: Golf
- Status: Professional
- Professional wins: 8

Best results in major championships
- Masters Tournament: DNP
- PGA Championship: DNP
- U.S. Open: DNP
- The Open Championship: 13th: 1963

Sewsunker "Papwa" Sewgolum (OIS) (12 December 1928 – 5 July 1978) was a South African professional golfer of ethnic Indian origin, who carved a niche for himself in golfing folklore when he became the first golfer of colour to win a provincial open in South Africa. He became a symbol of the sports boycott movement when pictures of him receiving his trophy outdoors in the rain were published across the world: due to apartheid, he was not allowed to enter the clubhouse.

== Professional career ==
Sewgolum began his career as a caddie. Sewgolum was a caddie for amateur golfer Graham Wulff. Impressed by Sewgolum's great talents, Wulff arranged for him to try to qualify for the 1959 Open Championship and participate in the Dutch Open that summer. Sewgolum qualified for the Open Championship when he shot a 71 and won the Dutch Open. He would go on to successfully defend his championship the following year. He was noted for his unconventional grip, holding the club with his right hand above the left.

In 1961, Sewgolum was the first non-white to take part in the South African Open. Just two years after he broke the color barrier he finished second, losing by one shot to Afrikaner Retief Waltman.

Later in 1963, he caused a stir when he beat 103 white golfers, including Harold Henning, at the Natal Open. He was the first non-white person to win an event on the South Africa circuit. He also performed admirably later in the summer at the 1963 Open Championship, shooting 71-74-73-72 to finish in solo 13th. Among the many South African golfers at the event, Gary Player was the only one to score better than Sewgolum, beating him by three shots. It was Sewgolum's best ever finish in a major. The next year he won the Dutch Open for the third and final time. He also won the 1964 Cock of the North, an event in Zambia.

In 1965, he won the Natal Open for the second time, defeating runner-up Gary Player. Even more famous than his victory, however, was the trophy presentation. Sewgolum was forced to accept the trophy outside of Durban Country Club in the rain. Indian, Colored and black people were not allowed in the clubhouse, otherwise the club could lose its liquor license. Sewgolum's performance received worldwide attention and was covered by The New York Times. He would return to defend his championship in February 1966 but would finish in fourth place with a score of 292, six behind Player. The following year, in 1967, Sewgolum would nearly win the Dutch Open for the fourth time, finishing two behind England's Peter Townsend.

In addition to his achievements in mainstream events, Sewgolum was also the winner of a number of non-white golfing championships in South Africa. His success embarrassed the apartheid government, however, and he was ultimately banned from playing golf or even entering a golf course as a spectator.

== Personal life ==
Sewgolum had five children with his wife, Suminthra. He would die impoverished in 1978 at the age of 49.

== Legacy ==
A number of books and films have been created based on his legacy. They include the 2005 film Papwa: The Lost Dream of a South African Golfing Legend. A decade later, the biography Papwa: Golf's Lost Legend was published. It was written by Maxine Case.

== Professional wins ==
this list may be incomplete

=== Southern Africa wins (5) ===
- 1963 Natal Open, Grand Prix (Royal Durban)
- 1964 Cock of the North (Zambia)
- 1965 Natal Open
- 1966 Bata Bush Babes Tournament (Rhodesia)

=== European wins (3) ===
- 1959 Dutch Open
- 1960 Dutch Open
- 1964 Dutch Open

== Honours and awards ==
- Sewgolum received a posthumous achievement award from President Thabo Mbeki in 2003, the Silver Medal in the Order of Ikhamanga.
- Durban has a golf course named after him. The Papwa Sewgolum Municipal Golf Course is an 18-hole flat woodland course situated in the suburb of Reservoir Hills.

== Results in major championships ==
Tournament	1959	1960	1961	1962	1963	1964	1965	1966	1967	1968	1969	1970
The Open Championship	CUT	CUT			13	CUT			53			CUT

Note: Sewgolum only played in The Open Championship.

Did not play

CUT = missed the half-way cut
"T" = tied
