= Jimmy Prentice =

Scottish golfer

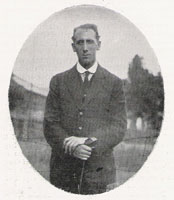
- Prentice c. 1915

Personal information
- Full name: James Alexander Webster Prentice
- Nationality: Scotland
- Born: 29 May 1885 Joppa, Edinburgh, Scotland
- Died: 6 June 1915 (aged 30) Boulogne, France
- Height: 6 ft 2 in (1.88 m)

Career
- Sport: Golf
- Status: Amateur
- Professional wins: 1

James Alexander Webster Prentice (29 May 1885 – 6 June 1915) was a Scottish amateur golfer who played in the early 20th century. Prentice moved to South Africa and 1905 and won the South African Open in 1913. He was also four times South African Amateur Champion. He was wounded at Hooge near Ypres during World War I and died in hospital the following day.

== Early life ==
Prentice was born in Joppa, Edinburgh, the son of the Reverend Archibald and Jane Anne Prentice (nee Russell). He was educated at George Watson's College and trained in the Norwich Union Insurance Company. While in Scotland he played golf at Portobello golf club and rugby for Brunstane rugby club.

== Golf career ==
Prentice emigrated to South Africa in 1905. He was a regular competitor in the South African Open and the South African Amateur Championship. In 1907 he was runner-up in the Amateur Championship. In 1908 the Open and Amateur title were contested in the same event. Prentice was the leading amateur, finishing 5th, and he thus took the Amateur Championship. He was again the leading amateur in 1909, finishing 4th, and retained the Amateur Championship. In 1910 he was 5th in the event but was the second amateur. In 1911 the two titles were contested as separate events. Prentice finished 4th and leading amateur in the Open and won the Amateur Championship for the third time.

Prentice returned to the United Kingdom in 1912 and missed the South African championships. He played in the Amateur Championship at Royal North Devon Golf Club where he won three matches before losing a close match in the last-16 round. He entered the 1912 Open Championship but did not qualify. Later in the summer he won the Cruden Bay Amateur Tournament, beating his brother Thomas in the semi-final, and the Peterhead Amateur Tournament, this time beating Thomas in the final.

In 1913 the Open and Amateur titles were again contested in the same event. Prentice finished with a score of 304, 10 strokes again of the next amateur and beating all the professionals, to win the Open title and the Amateur Championship for the fourth time. Willie Binnie and Jack Fotheringham were the leading professionals, two strokes behind. Prentice had less success in 1914 finishing 4th in the Amateur event and well down the field in the Open contest.

Up to 1910, Prentice represented the Port Elizabeth club, but during his 1912 visit to England, he represented the Johannesburg club. After his death in 1915 he was described as "of The Johannesburg Golf Club Johannesburg South Africa".

== Death ==
In World War I, Prentice served in the 3rd Dragoon Guards (Prince of Wales' Own), where he held the rank of Lance Corporal. Prentice was wounded on 5 June 1915 at Hooge near Ypres and died in hospital the following day in Boulogne, France, aged 30.

== Tournament wins (5) ==
- 1908 South African Amateur
- 1909 South African Amateur
- 1911 South African Amateur
- 1913 South African Open, South African Amateur
