= George Fotheringham =

Scottish-American golfer (1883–1971)

George L. Fotheringham
- Fotheringham, c. 1913

Personal information
- Full name: George Lyall Fotheringham
- Nationality: Scotland; United States
- Born: 9 July 1883 Carnoustie, Scotland
- Died: 8 April 1971 (aged 87) West Long Branch, New Jersey
- Spouse: Jean W. Fotheringham
- Children: 1

Career
- Sport: Golf
- Status: Professional
- Professional wins: 5

Best results in major championships
- Masters Tournament: DNP
- PGA Championship: T9: 1919
- U.S. Open: T29: 1919
- The Open Championship: 13th: 1912

Achievements and awards
- South African Golf Hall of Fame: 1971

George Lyall Fotheringham (9 July 1883 – 8 April 1971) was a Scottish-American professional golfer who played in the early 20th century. He won the South African Open five times and was a founding member of the PGA of America.

== Early life ==
Fotheringham was born in Carnoustie, Scotland, on 9 July 1883. As a boy he caddied and apprenticed as a club maker.

== Golf career ==
In 1903 he moved to Durban, Colony of Natal and took up a position as professional at the Royal Durban Golf Club and remained there until 1914. He won the South African Open five times, in 1908, 1910, 1911, 1912 and 1914. He finished tied for 13th place in the 1912 Open Championship held at Muirfield. In 1914 he was posted as professional at the Williamsport Country Club in Williamsport, Pennsylvania.

=== Founding member of PGA of America ===
He was one of the founding members of the PGA of America and played in the first two PGA Championship tournaments, in 1916 and 1919. The tournament was not held during the war years of 1917 and 1918.

=== PGA Championship ===
Fotheringham played in the first two PGA Championship tournaments, held in 1916 and 1919. He lost his match in 1916 to Jim Barnes 8 and 7 but defeated Eddie Loos 8 and 6 in 1919 and finished the event tied for ninth place. He finished second in both the 1920 Philadelphia Open and the 1924 New Jersey Open.

== Death and legacy ==
He died in West Long Branch, New Jersey, on 8 April 1971. Fotheringham is best known for being a founding member of the PGA of America and for winning the South African Open five times.

== Tournament wins (5) ==
Note: This list may be incomplete.

- 1908 South African Open
- 1910 South African Open
- 1911 South African Open
- 1912 South African Open
- 1914 South African Open
