= Terry Westbrook =

South African professional golfer (born 1939)

Personal information
- Full name: Terrence E. Westbrook
- Nationality: South Africa
- Born: 19 May 1939 (age 87)

Career
- Sport: Golf
- Status: Professional
- Former tours: European Tour; Southern Africa Tour
- Professional wins: 5

Number of wins by tour
- Sunshine Tour: 1
- Other: 4

Best results in major championships
- Masters Tournament: DNP
- PGA Championship: DNP
- U.S. Open: DNP
- The Open Championship: CUT: 1964, 1972, 1973

Terrence E. Westbrook (born May 19, 1939) is a South African professional golfer.

== Early life ==
Westbrook lost his left hand's middle finger and a large portion of his left thumb in a childhood accident. Despite this he managed to become a professional golfer.

== Professional career ==
One of his earliest successes was at the 1963 Dunlop South African Masters where he finished joint runner-up, three behind Bruce Keyter. His first professional victories were at the Cock of the North tournament in Zambia. Westbrook won the event in 1966 and successfully defended the championship twice.

His best years were in the early 1970s. In February 1970, Westbrook finished runner-up at the South African Open, the nation's most prestigious tournament, three behind England's Tommy Horton. In January 1971, at the beginning of the 1970–71 season, Westbrook started the final round of the Natal Open tied with fellow South Africa golfers Bobby Cole and Simon Hobday. With a final round 68 (−4) he finished at 283 (−5) and defeated Cole by one. Later in the year, at the beginning of the 1971–72 season, Westbrook again won. Three back of England's Peter Oosterhuis at the beginning of the final round, Westbrook overcame him with a final round 69 (−3) to win the Schoeman Park Open by two.

Westbrook played sporadically in Europe in the 1960s and joined the European Tour in its inaugural 1972 season. In his first season he recorded a top-10 at the Viyella PGA Championship, the tour's flagship event. It was his only top-10 of the year but helped him secure 50th position on the Order of Merit, the final position that assured full-time status for the following season. In 1973 he recorded his highest finish on the European Tour, reaching the finals of the Piccadilly Medal, a medal match play event. He won his first four matches of the event then defeated compatriot Hugh Baiocchi on the 20th hole of the quarterfinals and Scottish club professional Alistair Thomson in the semi-final. Two years after defeating Peter Oosterhuis in South Africa, he would compete against the English star again in the final round. He would not have as much luck in the final match, as Oosterhuis played excellently against Westbrook, shooting 67 (−6) to win easily by six strokes. Westbrook would also qualify for that year's Open Championship, held at Royal Troon Golf Club. He made the halfway cut but shot a disappointing 77 (+5) in the third round and did not qualify for the final round.

1974 would be Westbrook's final season on the European Tour. He made only 4 of 14 cuts and did not maintain his exemption. He would not play on the European Tour again.

== Professional wins (5) ==
=== Southern Africa Tour wins (1) ===
No.	Date	Tournament	Winning score	Margin of victory	Runner-up
1	11 Dec 1971	Schoeman Park Open	−13 (71-67-68-69=275)	2 strokes	(England) Peter Oosterhuis

=== Other wins (4) ===
- 1966 Cock of the North
- 1967 Cock of the North
- 1968 Cock of the North
- 1971 Natal Open

== Results in major championships ==
Tournament	1964	1965	1966	1967	1968	1969	1970	1971	1972	1973
The Open Championship	CUT								CUT	CUT

Note: Westbrook only played in The Open Championship.

Did not play

CUT = missed the half-way cut (3rd round cut in 1973 Open Championship)
