= 1990–91 Southern Africa Tour =

Golf tour season

1990–91 Southern Africa Tour season
- Duration: 12 November 1990 – 2 March 1991
- Number of official events: 12
- Most wins: (South Africa) John Bland (5)
- Order of Merit: (South Africa) John Bland

The 1990–91 Southern Africa Tour was the 20th season of the Southern Africa Tour, the main professional golf tour in South Africa since it was formed in 1971.

== Season outline ==
The early half of the season was dominated by John Bland and Fulton Allem who alternated between wins for the first six events. The first event of the season was a medal match play event, the Minolta Copiers Match Play, with Bland victorious. Allem won the next event, the Twee Jonge Gezellen Masters with Bland finishing solo third. At the following event, the Bloemfontein Classic, Bland was victorious. Allem returned the favor the following week when he won the Goodyear Classic by two shots from Bland. Bland won the first event after the Christmas break, the Palabora Classic. Allem then won the next tournament, the ICL International.

A variety of golfers played well in the second half of the season, especially South Africans Roger Wessels, Bland and Wayne Westner, as well as American Hugh Royer III and Englishman Mark James. At the seventh event of the year, the Lexington PGA Championship, Royer, James and Wessels were tied at the end of regulation. There was a sudden-death playoff. Royer and James bogeyed the first and second holes of the playoff, respectively, to give Wessels the win. Westner won the next event, the Protea Assurance South African Open, by four shots over James. The following week, the AECI Charity Classic, Westner shot a final round 65 to secure another win. Royer won the subsequent event, the Hollard Royal Swazi Sun Classic. It was Bland, however, that bookended the year with success, winning the final two events, the Bell's Cup and the Trustbank Tournament of Champions.

== Schedule ==
The following table lists official events during the 1990–91 season.

Date	Tournament	Location	Purse (R)	Winner (Note: The number in brackets after each winner's name is the number of Southern Africa Tour events they had won up to and including that tournament. This information is only shown for Southern Africa Tour members.)	OWGR points	Notes
17 Nov	Minolta Copiers Match Play	Transvaal	280,000	(South Africa) John Bland (15)	8	
24 Nov	Twee Jonge Gezellen Masters	Cape	350,000	(South Africa) Fulton Allem (8)	8	
15 Dec	Bloemfontein Classic	Orange Free State	280,000	(South Africa) John Bland (16)	8	
22 Dec	Goodyear Classic	Cape	280,000	(South Africa) Fulton Allem (9)	8	
12 Jan	Palabora Classic	Transvaal	280,000	(South Africa) John Bland (17)	8	
19 Jan	ICL International	Transvaal	280,000	(South Africa) Fulton Allem (10)	10	
26 Jan	Lexington PGA Championship	Transvaal	280,000	(South Africa) Roger Wessels (1)	10	
2 Feb	Protea Assurance South African Open	Natal	350,000	(South Africa) Wayne Westner (3)	8	
9 Feb	AECI Charity Classic	Transvaal	280,000	(South Africa) Wayne Westner (4)	8	
16 Feb	Hollard Royal Swazi Sun Classic	Swaziland	280,000	(United States) Hugh Royer III (1)	8	
23 Feb	Bell's Cup	Cape	280,000	(South Africa) John Bland (18)	8	New tournament
2 Mar	Trustbank Tournament of Champions	Transvaal	280,000	(South Africa) John Bland (19)	8	Tour Championship

=== Unofficial events ===
The following events were sanctioned by the Southern Africa Tour, but did not carry official money, nor were wins official.

Date	Tournament	Location	Purse (R)	Winner	OWGR points	Notes
9 Dec 1990	Nedbank Million Dollar Challenge	Transvaal	US$2,500,000	(South Africa) David Frost	30	Limited-field event

== Order of Merit ==
The Order of Merit was based on prize money won during the season, calculated in South African rand.

Position	Player	Prize money (R)
1	(South Africa) John Bland	333,637
2	(South Africa) Fulton Allem	190,090
3	(South Africa) Wayne Westner	168,158
4	(South Africa) Hugh Baiocchi	155,409
5	(Zimbabwe) Tony Johnstone	146,918
