= Copperleaf Golf and Country Estate =

Copperleaf Golf & Country Estate
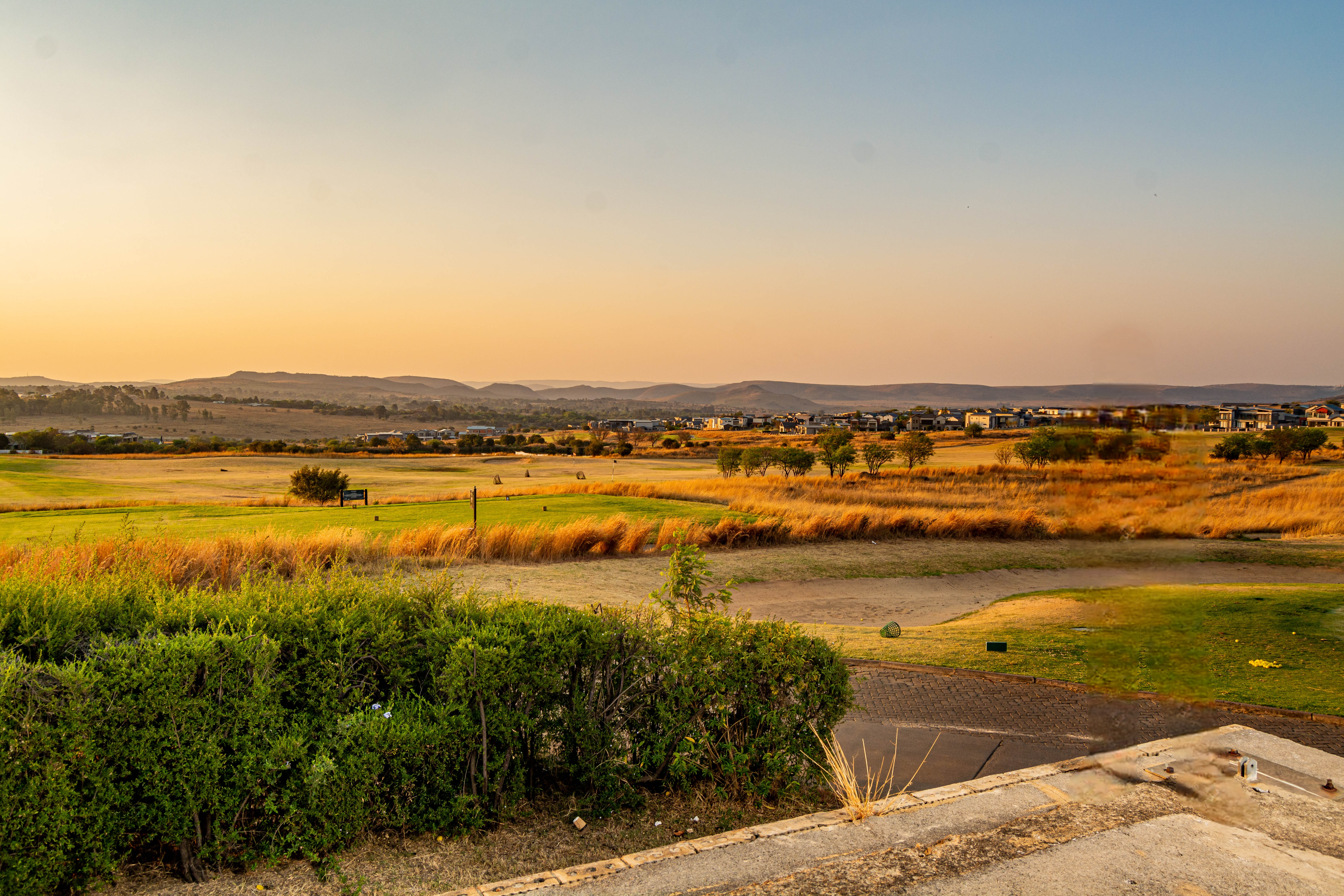
- Copperleaf Estate Central Vista from 10th tee

- Location in Gauteng, South Africa Copperleaf Golf and Country Estate (Gauteng)
- 25.879805°S 28.046770°E

Club information
- Location: Centurion, Gauteng, South Africa
- Established: 2004 (as Gardener Ross Golf and Country Estate)
- Type: Private
- Owner: Investec Property
- Operator: The Els Club (African Golf Company)
- Tota holes: 18
- Tournaments: Tshwane Open (2013, 2014)
- Greens: A1 bentgrass
- Fairways: Kikuyu
- Website: https://copper-leaf.co.za/

The Els Club at Copperleaf
- Designed by: Ernie Els
- Par: 72
- Length: 7,315 m (championship tees)

Copperleaf Golf and Country Estate is a residential estate and golf club in Centurion, Gauteng, South Africa. It is in the countryside outside Johannesburg and Pretoria. It includes the Els Club, a golf course designed by South African golfer Ernie Els. The estate is built on land that once belonged to Els’s grandfather, Ernie Vermaak.

The estate originally launched in mid-2004 under the name Gardener Ross Golf and Country Estate. In 2010, Investec Property bought the development, rebranding it as Copperleaf Golf & Country Estate.

== The Els Club ==
The Els Club at Copperleaf is an 18-hole championship golf course designed by Ernie Els and opened in 2007. Conceived as a "modern classic" within South Africa's Highveld grassland, the design uses the estate's natural terrain, flanked by indigenous grasslands, rocky outcrops, and Magaliesberg panoramas. Stretching approximately 7,315 metres from the championship (black) tees to 5,117 metres from the forward tees, making it one of the longest courses in the world. Built to USGA standards, the course was the host venue for the 2013 and 2014 Tshwane Open on the DP World (formerly European) Tour.

The standout signature hole at The Els Club at Copperleaf is the 6th hole, a 375 metre par-4. Tee shots must favour the right side of the fairway, ideally not using the driver, to navigate the steep right-to-left slope. From there, players face an angled approach over water to a raised green.

Several other holes deliver challenges: the 3rd hole, a long par-3 for which from the back tees it plays more than 250 metres; the 4th, a 626 metre par-5, the longest in European Tour history, recently shortened. The 11th, a downhill par-5 with an elevated green, rewards distance off the tee, while the 14th par-3 stands out for its absence of bunker or water hazards, rare in South African golf, relying instead on length and a challenging green.

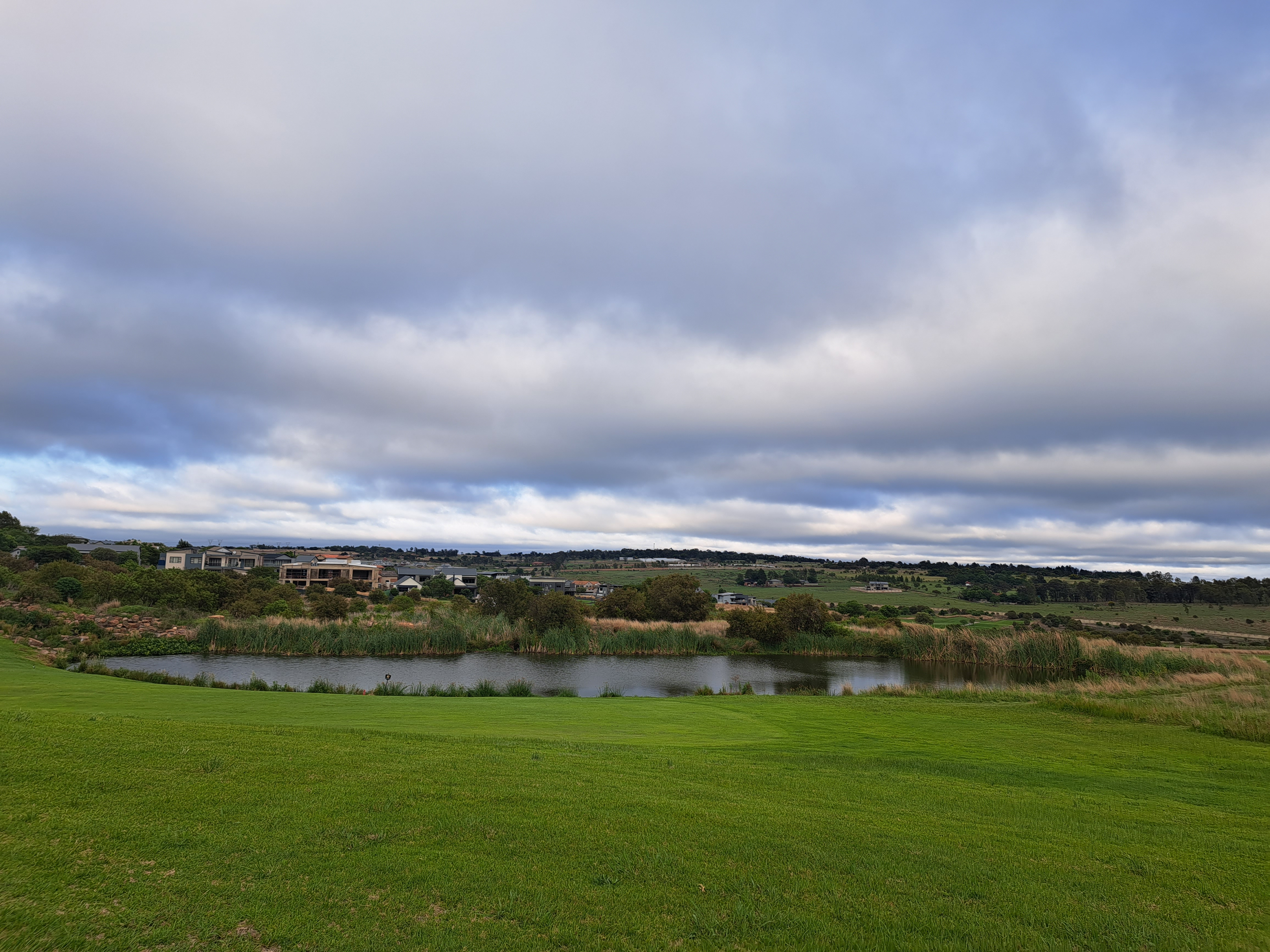
Water Hazard of 17th hole at The Els Club Copperleaf

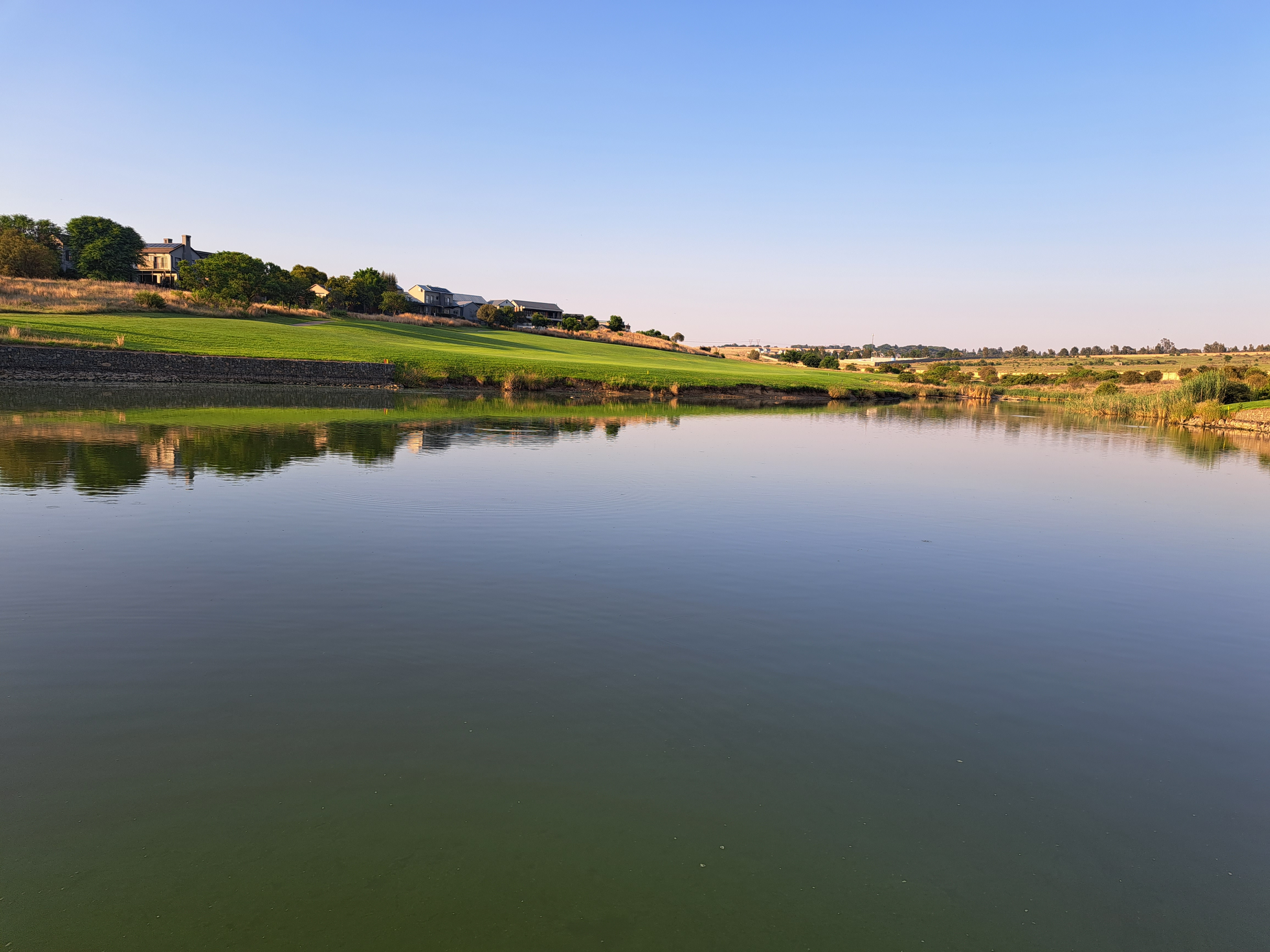
fairway from Copperleaf 6th Green over Water Hazard

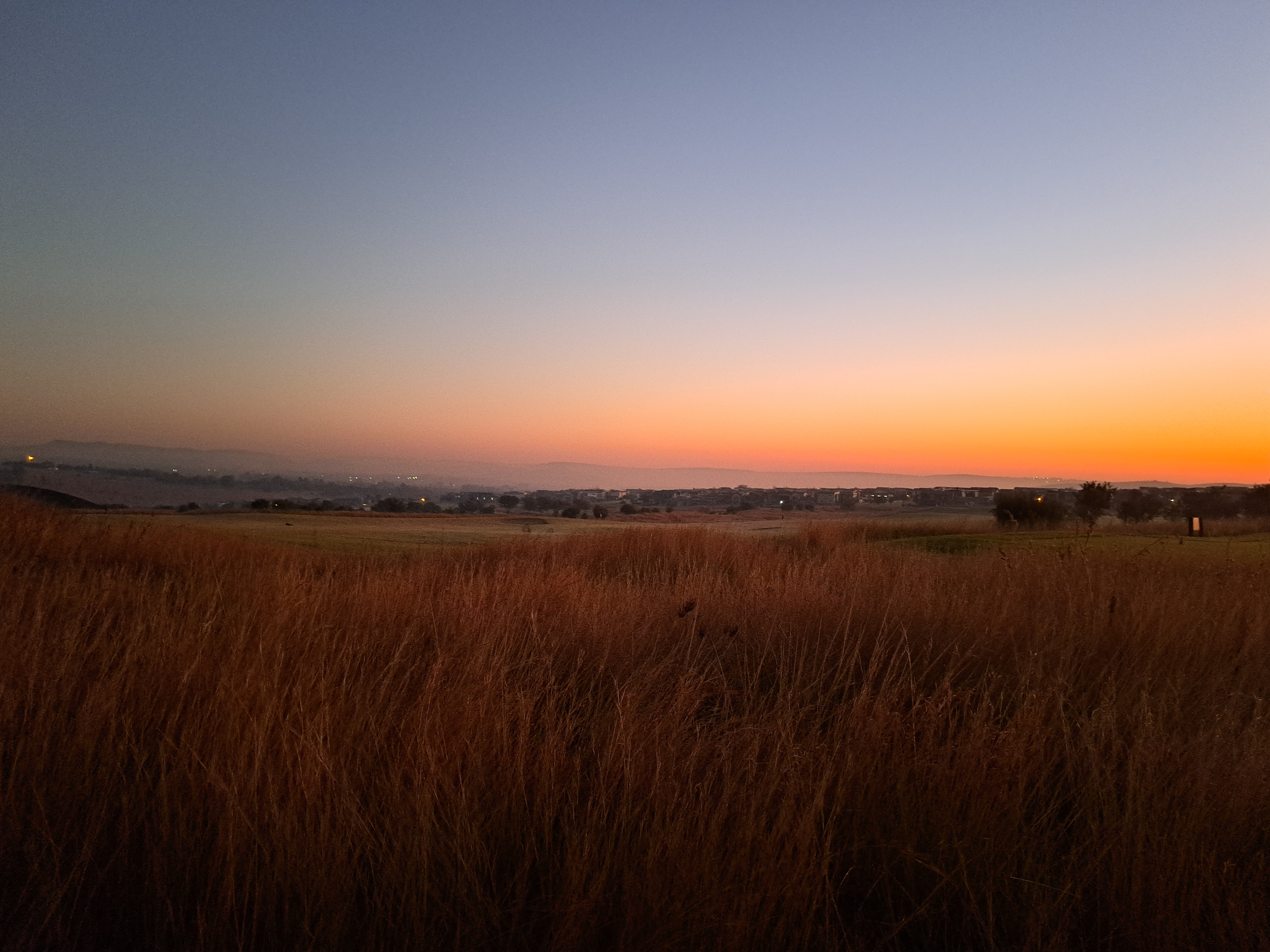
Rough between Tee's of 10th hole

Tshwane Open:

Year	Tours	Winner	Score	To Par	Margin of victory
2013	AFR, EUR	(South Africa) Dawie Van der Walt	267	-20	2 Strokes
2014	AFR, EUR	(England) Ross Fisher	268	-21	3 Strokes
