= Sid Brews =

South African golfer

Personal information
- Full name: Sydney Francis Brews
- Nationality: England; South Africa
- Born: 29 May 1899 Blackheath, London, England
- Died: 1972 (aged 72–73)

Career
- Sport: Golf
- Turned professional: 1914
- Professional wins: 37

Best results in major championships
- Masters Tournament: DNP
- PGA Championship: DNP
- U.S. Open: T21: 1935
- The Open Championship: 2nd: 1934

Sydney Francis Brews (29 May 1899 – 1972) was a South African professional golfer.

== Early life ==
Brews was born in Blackheath, London, England.

== Professional career ==
In 1914, Brews turned professional. He worked as the club professional at Minchinhampton Golf Club in Gloucestershire. In the mid-1920s, he emigrated to South Africa. He won the South African Open eight times between 1925 and 1952, when he became the tournament's oldest-ever champion aged 53. He also won the South African PGA Championship six times, and many provincial opens. His brother Jock Brews also won the South African Open four times.

He enjoyed considerable success outside of South Africa. In 1934, probably his finest year, he finished second in the British Open to Henry Cotton, and won both the French Open and Dutch Open championships. He would retain both of those titles in 1935.

== Professional wins ==
=== South African wins ===
- 1924 Transvaal Open
- 1925 South African Open, Orange Free State Open
- 1926 South African PGA Championship, Natal Open
- 1927 South African Open, Natal Open, Orange Free State Open
- 1928 South African PGA Championship, Orange Free State Open
- 1929 Natal Open
- 1930 South African Open, Transvaal Open
- 1931 South African Open, Transvaal Open
- 1932 Transvaal Open
- 1933 South African Open, South African PGA Championship, Transvaal Open
- 1934 South African Open, South African PGA Championship, Transvaal Open
- 1935 Transvaal Open
- 1936 South African PGA Championship, Transvaal Open
- 1937 Natal Open
- 1949 South African Open
- 1952 South African Open, South African PGA Championship

=== Other wins ===
- 1922 Gloucestershire and Somerset Alliance Professional Championship, Gloucestershire and Somerset Open
- 1929 Belgian Open
- 1934 French Open, Dutch Open
- 1935 Philadelphia PGA Invitational, French Open, Dutch Open

== Results in major championships ==
Tournament	1921	1922	1923	1924	1925	1926	1927	1928	1929
U.S. Open									
The Open Championship	T61	T53	T22						T18

Tournament	1930	1931	1932	1933	1934	1935	1936	1937	1938
U.S. Open						T21			
The Open Championship					2	T31			T13

Note: Brews only played in the U.S. Open and The Open Championship.

Top 10
Did not play

NT = No tournament
WD = withdrew
CUT = missed the half-way cut
"T" indicates a tie for a place

== Team appearances ==
- England–Scotland Professional Match (representing England): 1934 (winners)
