= Hugh Royer III =

American professional golfer (born 1964)

Personal information
- Nationality: United States
- Born: February 13, 1964 (age 62) Columbus, Georgia, U.S.
- Height: 6 ft 1 in (1.85 m)
- Weight: 155 lb (70 kg; 11.1 st)

Career
- Sport: Golf
- College: Mississippi State University; Columbus State University
- Turned professional: 1987
- Former tours: PGA Tour; Nationwide Tour; Pro Golf Tour
- Professional wins: 6

Number of wins by tour
- Sunshine Tour: 1
- Korn Ferry Tour: 4
- Other: 1

Best results in major championships
- Masters Tournament: DNP
- PGA Championship: DNP
- U.S. Open: T55: 1994
- The Open Championship: DNP

Hugh Royer III (born February 13, 1964) is an American professional golfer and golf instructor.

== Early life ==
Royer was born in Columbus, Georgia. He is the son of the professional golfer Hugh Royer Jr., who played on the PGA Tour for 14 years and won the 1970 Western Open. He spent the majority of his childhood traveling with his father on Tour.

== Amateur career ==
Royer received a scholarship to Mississippi State University where he played for two years. In those two seasons, Royer had one tournament win and seven top-10 finishes, and held the low stroke average each year. He then transferred to Columbus State University for his junior and senior years, where his father served as head golf coach. He was NCAA Division II Player of the Year and First Team All-American in 1985 and 1986. He was named 1987 Amateur Player of the Year by the Carolinas Golf Reporter.

In the summer following his senior year at CSU, he won the Georgia Amateur Championship by one stroke over Allen Doyle. Two weeks later, he defeated Doyle again in the Southeastern Amateur by five strokes setting a record at 20 under par - a record not broken until 2017. Because of open-heart surgery, Royer was forced to withdraw from the U.S. Amateur later that year. Shortly after his recovery, Royer won the Azalea Amateur Invitational in Charleston, South Carolina in a playoff and won the Western Amateur. This gave the Western Golf Association the only father-son combination to win the Open and Amateur in their history.

== Professional career ==
Royer turned professional in 1987. He competed on the South African Tour for six years, where he had one tournament win and several runner-up finishes.

He started playing on the Nike Tour in 1991 and won his first title in 1993 in Florence, South Carolina at the Nike South Carolina Classic. Later that year, he won again in Texarkana, Arkansas at the Nike Texarkana Open. In 1995, he won the Nike Dominion Open and the Nike Permian Basin Open. Royer gained his PGA Tour card that year and retained it until 1998. He had four top-10 finishes. He competed on the Nationwide Tour in 1999 and 2000 before retiring.

=== Instructor career ===
Learning the game from his father and some top instructors gave Royer the desire to teach the game to others, especially to those who desire to play professionally. Royer's knowledge of the game, in addition to his playing experience, provided him with an adequate teaching philosophy that has proven successful among his own stable of students.

Royer worked for three years at the International Junior Golf Academy on Hilton Head Island where he trained the 2005 U.S. Girls' Junior champion, In-Kyung Kim, among other successful junior and collegiate players.

In 2007, Royer opened the Champions Golf Academy at the Long Bay Club in Myrtle Beach, South Carolina. The Champions Golf Academy is a specialized golf academy that provides instruction and individualized training programs for players of all levels, gap-year students, collegiate players, and amateurs.

== Personal life ==
Royer and his wife, Heather, reside in Myrtle Beach, South Carolina, and have five children: Leighanne, Sydney, Brai, Abbey, and Hugh Royer IV.

== Awards and honors ==
- In 1987, Royer the Carolinas Golf Reporter bestowed him as their Amateur Player of the Year.
- In 2000, Royer was inducted into the Columbus State University Athletic Hall of Fame.

== Amateur wins ==
- 1985 NCAA Division II Championship
- 1986 Georgia State Amateur, Southeastern Amateur
- 1987 Azalea Invitational, Western Amateur

== Professional wins (6) ==
=== Southern Africa Tour wins (1) ===
No.	Date	Tournament	Winning score	Margin of victory	Runners-up
1	Feb 16, 1991	Hollard Royal Swazi Sun Classic	−23 (64-66-67-68=265)	4 strokes	(United States) Robin Freeman, (South Africa) Des Terblanche

Southern Africa Tour playoff record (0–1)

No.	Year	Tournament	Opponents	Result
1	1991	Lexington PGA Championship	(England) Mark James, (South Africa) Roger Wessels	Wessels won par with on second extra hole Royer eliminated by par on first hole

=== Nike Tour wins (4) ===
No.	Date	Tournament	Winning score	Margin of victory	Runner(s)-up
1	May 2, 1993	Nike South Carolina Classic	−15 (68-65-69-71=273)	1 stroke	(United States) Chris DiMarco, (United States) Steve Haskins
2	Aug 29, 1993	Nike Texarkana Open	−21 (67-67-66-67=267)	2 strokes	(Australia) Steve Rintoul
3	Jun 4, 1995	Nike Dominion Open	−18 (67-65-69-69=270)	Playoff	(United States) Tom Scherrer
4	Aug 20, 1995	Nike Permian Basin Open	−13 (69-68-68-70=275)	1 stroke	(United States) Paul Claxton, (United States) Frank Conner, (United States) Kawtka Cotner, (United States) Franklin Langham, (United States) Dave Miley, (United States) Chris Smith, (New Zealand) Phil Tataurangi

Nike Tour playoff record (1–0)

No.	Year	Tournament	Opponent	Result
1	1995	Nike Dominion Open	(United States) Tom Scherrer	Won with birdie on first extra hole

=== Pro Golf Tour wins (1) ===
No.	Date	Tournament	Winning score	Margin of victory	Runner-up
1	Jul 31, 1988	Tascosa Invitational	−16 (69-69-66-68=272)	5 strokes	(United States) Ivan Smith

== See also ==
- 1995 Nike Tour graduates
- 1997 PGA Tour Qualifying School graduates
- List of golfers with most Web.com Tour wins
