= Glendower Golf Club =

Golf complex in Edenvale, South Africa

Coordinates: 26.160°S 28.145°E

- Interactive map of Glendower Golf Club

Club information
- Location: Edenvale, Gauteng, South Africa
- Established: 1937
- Type: Public resort
- Tota holes: 18
- Tournaments: BMW South African Open
- Website: https://www.glendower.co.za/Home.aspx/

Course
- Designed by: Charles Hugh Alison (1937); Arthur Tomsett
- Par: 72
- Length: 6,963 yards

The Glendower Golf Club is an 18-hole golf complex located in Edenvale, Gauteng, South Africa. The course has been the home of the South African Open for eight competitions. Englishman Chris Paisley won his first European Tour title winning the 2018 SA Open. Englishman Graeme Storm won the 2017 SA Open beating Rory McIlroy in a play-off while South African golfer Brandon Stone won the 2016 SA Open.

== History ==
In 1935, ten businessmen formed a company with an idea to create a country club and purchased the farm Glendower which in those days was on the edge to the town of Edenvale. The land bought was 266.7 acres in size and consisted mostly of a tree plantation. A parkland course was planned and an English golfing architect, Charles Hugh Alison, was employed to design the course and it was constructed by A.F.Tomsett. The course would open on 7 March 1937. In 1939, The Transvaal Open Championship was held at the club and won by Bobby Locke with a record score of 265. A record prize of £100 for the time, was offered by the club in 1946. In 1973, the club grounds would be declared a nature reserve. At the Volvo Toro Classic held at the course in 1975, Allan Henning scored eleven birdies in his first round. The club has hosted the South African Open in 1989, 1993, 1997, 2013, 2015, 2016, 2017 and 2018. In 1997, Vijay Singh became the first non-white player to win a South African Open at the course. The BMW South African Championship was again hosted from 11 to 14 January 2018 at the Glendower Golf Club.

== Course ==
In 1985, the course was redesigned with all 18 greens reshaped and rebuilt to USGA standard, new tee positions added and extended and new water features added at eleven holes. The course has fairways with 64 bunkers, 27 on the front nine and 37 on the back nine and has water hazards on 11 of its 18 holes.

=== Holes and yardages ===
Championship Tee

1. 445 yards – par 4
2. 557 yards – par 5
3. 220 yards – par 3
4. 509 yards – par 4
5. 503 yards – par 4
6. 199 yards – par 3
7. 486 yards – par 4
8. 522 yards – par 5
9. 401 yards – par 4

Out: 3,842 yards – par 36

1. 477 yards – par 4
2. 433 yards – par 4
3. 407 yards – par 4
4. 571 yards – par 5
5. 173 yards – par 3
6. 547 yards – par 5
7. 441 yards – par 4
8. 222 yards – par 3
9. 451 yards – par 4

In: 3,722 yards- par 36

Total: 7,564 yards- par 72
