= Gary Player Country Club =

Golf club in Sun City, South Africa

Coordinates: 25.339275°S 27.106319°E

- Interactive map of Gary Player Country Club

Club information
- Location: Sun City, South Africa
- Type: Private
- Owner: Sun International
- Tota holes: 18
- Tournaments: Nedbank Golf Challenge; Dimension Data Pro-Am; Sun City Challenge; South African Open
- Designed by: Gary Player
- Par: 72
- Length: 7,981 yds
- Course record: 62 Lee Westwood (2011)

The Gary Player Country Club is a golf club in Sun City, South Africa, named after golf icon and Grand Slam winner, Gary Player. It is home to one of the world's longest golf courses, at almost 8,000 yards.

The Gary Player designed championship course is widely considered to be one of the best in South Africa, and one of the world's top 100. It has been voted the best several times by both Golf Digest and Complete Golfer, the leading golf magazines in the country. Player has designed almost 400 championship courses around the world, but this is the only course that officially carries his name.

The club also has a Gary Player Spa, restaurant and pro shop. The course is one of two within the Sun City Resort, the other being the Lost City Golf Course, with its famous crocodile hole with the green in the shape of the African continent, which was also designed by Gary Player but in a desert African style.

In December of each year, the club stages the Nedbank Golf Challenge, hosted by Gary Player and is one of the world's richest golf tournaments.
