= 1912 Open Championship =

Coordinates: 56.043°N 2.823°W

Tournament information
- Dates: 24–25 June 1912
- Location: Gullane, East Lothian, Scotland
- Course: Muirfield

Statistics
- Length: 6,448 yards (5,896 m)
- Field: 62 players
- Cut: none
- Prize fund: £125
- Winner's share: £50

Champion
- (Jersey) Ted Ray
- 295

Location in Scotland
Location in East Lothian, Scotland

The 1912 Open Championship was the 52nd Open Championship, held 24–25 June at Muirfield in Gullane, East Lothian, Scotland. Ted Ray led wire-to-wire and won the championship, four strokes ahead of runner-up Harry Vardon, the defending champion.

Following the problems caused by the large number of entries in 1911, qualification was re-introduced and took place on 20, 21, and 22 June. The top twenty and ties qualified on each of the three days; George Duncan led the twenty qualifiers on Thursday by seven strokes with a score of 149, and 168 was the qualifying score. There 21 qualifiers on the second day at 162 or better, led by Ted Ray on 153. There were 21 qualifiers on the third day; Tom Ball scored 144 on Saturday, six strokes ahead of the rest, and the qualifying mark was 160.

After the first two rounds on Monday, Ray led on 144, with Vardon at 147, James Braid on 148, and George Duncan in fourth at 149.

On Tuesday, Ray extended his lead to five strokes after the third round, and he was not seriously challenged in the final round in the afternoon, despite a 71 from Vardon. Despite his weight and with his nearest rivals still to complete their rounds, Ray was carried off the final green in triumph by some of his friends.

== Course ==
Hole	Yards	Hole	Yards
1	204	10	390
2	365	11	407
3	338	12	390
4	347	13	293
5	470	14	138
6	383	15	295
7	390	16	464
8	497	17	330
9	365	18	382
Out	3,359	In	3,089
Source:		Total	6,448

== Round summaries ==
=== First round ===
Monday, 24 June 1912 (morning)

Place	Player	Score
1	(Jersey) Ted Ray	71
2	(Scotland) George Duncan	72
T3	(England) William Horne	73
T3	(Scotland) Robert Thomson	73
T5	(Scotland) Laurie Ayton, Snr	74
T5	(France) Arnaud Massy	74
T7	(England) Tom Ball	75
T7	(Scotland) George Fotheringham	75
T7	(England) Fred Leach	75
T7	(England) J.H. Taylor	75
T7	(Jersey) Harry Vardon	75

=== Second round ===
Monday, 24 June 1912 (afternoon)

Place	Player	Score
1	(Jersey) Ted Ray	71-73=144
2	(Jersey) Harry Vardon	75-72=147
3	(Scotland) James Braid	77-71=148
4	(Scotland) George Duncan	72-77=149
5	(Scotland) Robert Thomson	73-77=150
T6	(France) Arnaud Massy	74-77=151
T6	(England) J.H. Taylor	75-76=151
T8	(Scotland) George Fotheringham	75-78=153
T8	(England) Charles Mayo	76-77=153
T10	(Scotland) Laurie Ayton, Snr	74-80=154
T10	(Ireland) Hugh McNeill	76-78=154

=== Third round ===
Tuesday, 25 June 1912 (morning)

Place	Player	Score
1	(Jersey) Ted Ray	71-73-76=220
2	(Scotland) James Braid	77-71-77=225
3	(Scotland) George Duncan	72-77-78=227
T4	(England) J.H. Taylor	75-76-77=228
T4	(Jersey) Harry Vardon	75-72-81=228
6	(Scotland) Laurie Ayton, Snr	74-80-75=229
7	(Scotland) Robert Thomson	73-77-80=230
8	(England) Charles Mayo	76-77-78=231
T9	(Scotland) George Fotheringham	75-78-79=232
T9	(England) Reg Wilson	82-75-75=232

=== Final round ===
Tuesday, 25 June 1912 (afternoon)

Place	Player	Score	Money (£)
1	(Jersey) Ted Ray	71-73-76-75=295	50
2	(Jersey) Harry Vardon	75-72-81-71=299	25
3	(Scotland) James Braid	77-71-77-78=303	15
4	(Scotland) George Duncan	72-77-78-78=305	10
5	(Scotland) Laurie Ayton, Snr	74-80-75-79=308	7; 10s
6	(Scotland) Sandy Herd	76-81-76-76=309	7; 10s
T7	(England) Fred Collins	76-79-81-74=310	3; 6s 8d
T7	(France) Jean Gassiat	76-80-78-76=310	3; 6s 8d
T7	(England) Reg Wilson	82-75-75-78=310	3; 6s 8d
10	(France) Arnaud Massy	74-77-82-78=311	0
