= Royal Johannesburg & Kensington Golf Club =

South African golf club

- The Royal Johannesburg & Kensington logo
- Interactive map of Royal Johannesburg & Kensington Golf Club

Club information
- Location: Johannesburg, Gauteng, South Africa
- Established: 1890
- Type: Public resort
- Tota holes: 36
- Tournaments: South African PGA Championship; Joburg Open
- Website: https://www.royaljk.za.com/

East Course
- Designed by: Robert Grimsdell (1935)
- Par: 72
- Length: 6,940 yards
- Course rating: 72

West Course
- Designed by: Laurie Waters (1909)
- Par: 72
- Length: 6,563 yards
- Course rating: 70

The Royal Johannesburg & Kensington Golf Club is a 36-hole golf complex located in Johannesburg, Gauteng, South Africa.

The resort opened in 1890 as the Royal Johannesburg Golf Club, and merged with the Kensington Golf Club in 1998. It is part of the PGA Tour network of golf courses. The East Course has hosted the South African PGA Championship since 2005 and both the East and West, the Joburg Open since 2007, the biggest annual professional golf event in Africa; the 2012 field was the largest of the PGA European Tour season, with 210 players. It also has hosted the International Final Qualifier (Africa) for the Open Championship since 2009, the Sanlam Women's Amateur Golf Championships of South Africa in 2008, and the 5 Nations Commonwealth Tournament in 2007.

== History ==
Founded on 6 November 1890, members of the Johannesburg Golf Club first began playing "behind Hospital Hill", in an area that later became known as Clarendon Circle and Empire Road. The club did not settle here, moving four times in the next 19 years, before settling in 1909 on the land it still occupies today.

The Club helped create the Transvaal Golf Union in 1908, and provided the first President of the South African Golf Union in 1910.

In 1930, the Prince of Wales (who later became King Edward VIII), played the West Course. Six months later, he became the club's patron. In July 1931, King George V added the "Royal" prefix to the club's name.

Little is known about the original Kensington Golf Club that went out of business in 1918. The later version of Kensington hosted a number of significant South African tournaments and competitions, particularly in the 1960s, 1970s, and 1980s. Kensington merged with Royal Johannesburg in 1998.

== West Course ==
The West Course was designed in 1909 by Laurie Waters. In 1929, British architect Major Hotchkin made considerable changes to the course, with construction being carried out by club professional Robert Grimsdell.

The 4th hole is regarded as the signature hole. A tributary of the Jukskei River sits at the front the green and is in play along the left hand side of the fairway. The hole is set against the scenic backdrop of Linksfield Ridge.

== East Course ==
In 1933, the club owners decided to build a second course, which resulted in the purchase of a farm to the east of the club. Grimsdell began designing the new course. Within two years, Grimsdell had constructed 21 new holes, and both the East and West courses were in play. Grimsdell then began construction on a new clubhouse, placed centrally between the two courses. Construction was completed in March 1939. Golf course architect Mark Muller revamped the original construction in 1998.

The 10th and 11th holes are reputed to be the two longest back-to-back par fours in the world. The South African PGA Championship, Joburg Open, and International Final Qualifier (Africa) for the Open Championship all play on this course.

=== Holes and Yardages ===
1. 463 yards – par 5
2. 211 yards – par 3
3. 403 yards – par 4
4. 411 yards – par 4
5. 139 yards – par 3
6. 510 yards – par 5
7. 355 yards – par 4
8. 457 yards – par 5
9. 374 yards – par 4

Out: 3,543 yards – par 37

1. 450 yards – par 4
2. 423 yards – par 4
3. 168 yards – par 3
4. 361 yards – par 4
5. 367 yards – par 4
6. 386 yards – par 4
7. 152 yards – par 3
8. 348 yards – par 4
9. 464 yards – par 5

In: 3,397 yards – par 35

Total: 6,940 yards – par 72

== Awards ==
The Royal became the first Audubon-certified golf course in South Africa, as it became a "Certified Audubon Cooperative Sanctuary" in 2005. The club also was the first member-owned club in South Africa to receive the Compleat Golfer 5 Star Golfing Experience Award, and has earned that same award three additional times since then.

In 2018 The East Championship Course received Africa's best course of the year and South Africa's best Course of the year by World Golf Awards.

== See also ==
- List of golf clubs granted Royal status
