= Danish Golf Union =

Governing body for golf in Denmark

- Sport: Golf
- Jurisdiction: National
- Abbreviation: DGU
- Founded: 1931
- Affiliation: National Olympic Committee and Sports Confederation of Denmark (DIF); International Golf Federation (IGF)
- Regional affiliation: European Golf Association (EGA)
- Headquarters: Brøndby, Denmark

Official website
- www.danskgolfunion.dk

The Danish Golf Union (Danish: Dansk Golf Union, DGU) is the governing body for the sport of golf in Denmark. It manages the national golf teams, the national golf championships, and maintains the Rules of Golf in Danish. DGU was founded in 1931 by Esbjerg Golfklub, Helsingør Golf Club, Odense Golfklub and Københavns Golf Klub, Denmark's oldest golf club founded in 1898. DGU became a member of the European Golf Association (EGA) in 1958 and is a member of Danmarks Idræts-Forbund, the National Olympic Committee and Sports Confederation of Denmark.

DGU organizes around 150,000 active golfers and around 190 golf clubs in Denmark.

== Championships ==
DGU organizes the following championships for men and women (eligible age in brackets):

- Danish Championship
- Danish Matchplay Championship
- Danish Junior Championship (under 18)
- Danish Mid-Age Championship (30+)
- Danish Senior Championship (50+)
- Danish Veteran Championship (60+)
- Danish Super Veteran Championship (70+)
- Danish 2-Generation Championship
- Danish GolfSixes Championship (18+)
- Danish Junior GolfSixes Championship (under 18)

== National team ==
DGU develops and manages the Danish National Golf Team.

Danish National Team – Record at European and World Championships

World Cup of Golf

(gold) 2016 Melbourne, Australia – Søren Kjeldsen & Thorbjørn Olesen
(silver) 2001 Gotemba, Japan – Thomas Bjørn & Søren Hansen

Individual
(silver) 2013 Thomas Bjørn
(silver) 1990 Anders Sørensen
(silver) 1989 Anders Sørensen

IGF World Championships

World Amateur Team Championship (Eisenhower Trophy, 1958–)

(gold) 2018 Irland – Nicolai Højgaard, Rasmus Højgaard, John Axelsen
(silver) 2010 Argentina – Joachim B. Hansen, Lucas Bjerregaard, Morten Ørum Madsen

Individual
(gold) 2010 Joachim B. Hansen

World Amateur Women's Team Championship (Espirito Santo Trophy, 1964–)

Individual
(silver) 2016 Puk Lyng Thomsen

EGA European Championships

European Amateur (1986–)

(gold) 2018 Nicolai Højgaard
(gold) 2010 Lucas Bjerregaard
(gold) 1993 Morten Backhausen
(bronze) 2012 Thomas Sørensen
(bronze) 2008 Morten Ørum Madsen
(bronze) 2002 Jeppe Huldahl

European Ladies Amateur (1986–)

(gold) 2013 Emily Kristine Pedersen
(silver) 2010 Line Vedel Hansen
(bronze) 2011 Charlotte Kring Lorentzen

European Amateur Team Championship (1959–)

(silver) 2015, Halmstad, Sweden
(bronze) 2016, Chantilly, France
(bronze) 2018, Berlin, Germany

European Ladies' Team Championship (1959–)

(bronze) 2018, Vienna, Austria

European Youths' Team Championship (U22, 1961–2006)

(gold) 1966, Kennemer, Netherlands
(silver) 1984, Hermitage, Ireland
(silver) 1979, Marianske Lazne, Czech Republic
(silver) 1970, Grand Ducal, Luxembourg

European Lady Junior's Team Championship (U22, 1968–2006)

(silver) 1980, Vienna, Austria

European Boys' Team Championship (U19, 1980–)

(gold) 2017, La Manga, Spain
(gold) 2009, Golf de Pan, Netherlands
(gold) 2007, Rold Skov, Denmark
(silver) 1987, Chantilly, France
(bronze) 2016, Diamond, Austria
(bronze) 2010, Klasis, Turkey

European Girls' Team Championship (U19, 1991–)

(gold) 2019, El Saler, Spain
(bronze) 2012, St. Leon Rot, Germany
(bronze) 2007, Oslo, Norway
(bronze) 2006, Esbjerg, Denmark
(bronze) 1993, Malaga, Spain

European Young Masters (U16, 1995–)

(gold) 2018 Sebastian Friedrichsen
(silver) 2014 John Axelsen
(silver) 2013 John Axelsen
(bronze) 2012 John Axelsen
(bronze) 2009 Daisy Nielsen
(bronze) 1998 Lisbeth Meincke

Other

Toyota Junior Golf World Cup (U19, 1992–)

(gold) 2018, Japan – Rasmus Højgaard, Nicolai Højgaard, Sebastian Friedrichsen, Frederik Sejr

Individual
(gold) 2018 Rasmus Højgaard
(gold) 2010 Lucas Bjerregaard
(silver) 2018 Nicolai Højgaard

=== Notable members ===
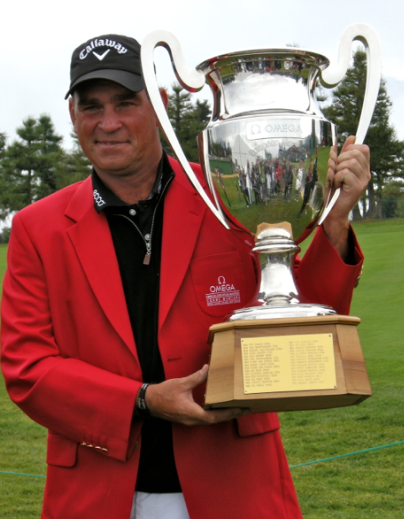
Thomas Bjørn, four-time Ryder Cup winner with 15 European Tour wins

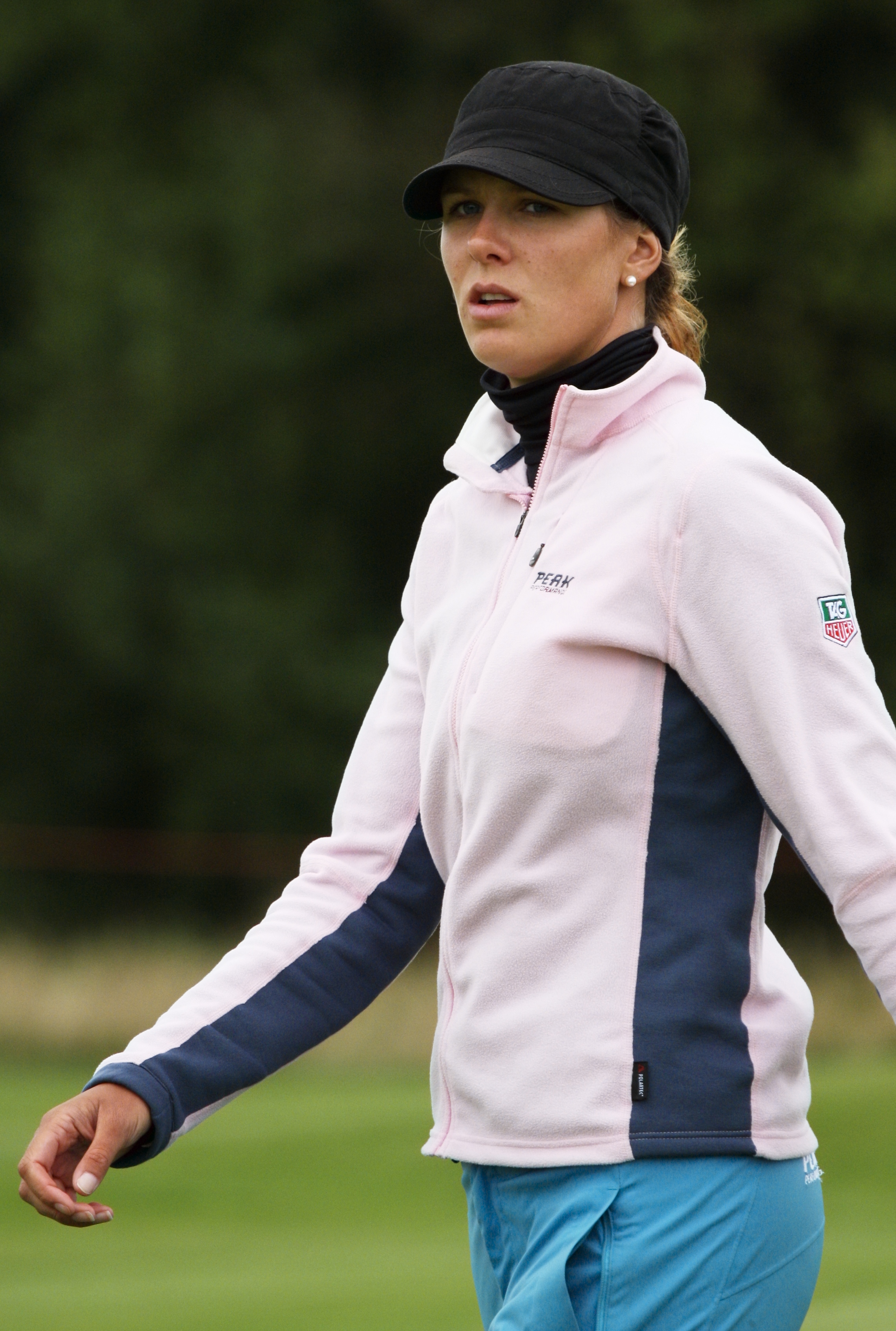
Iben Tinning, LET Order of Merit winner with 6 LET wins and 4 Solheim Cup appearances

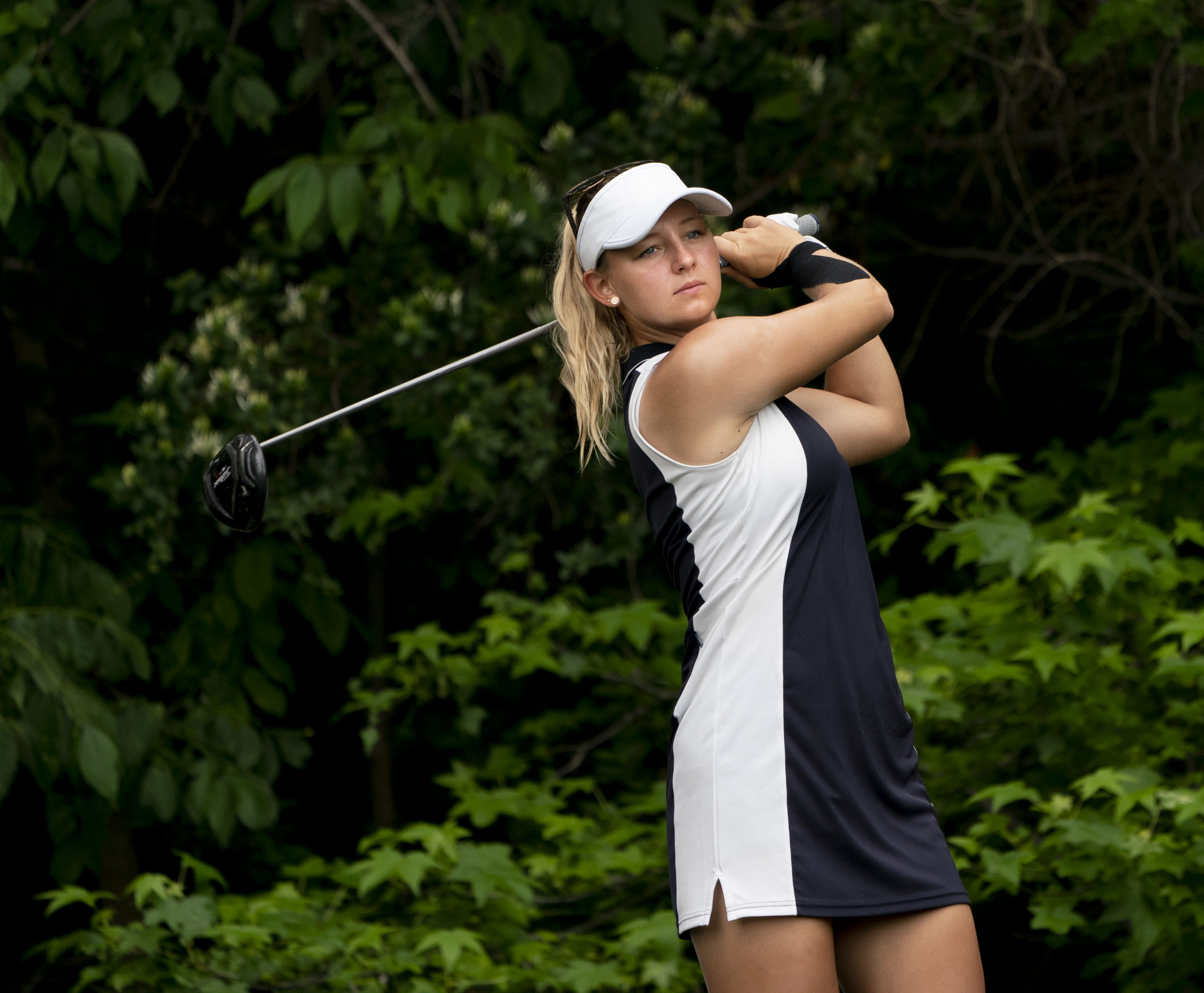
Emily Kristine Pedersen, European Ladies Amateur, LET Rookie of the Year and Solheim Cup player

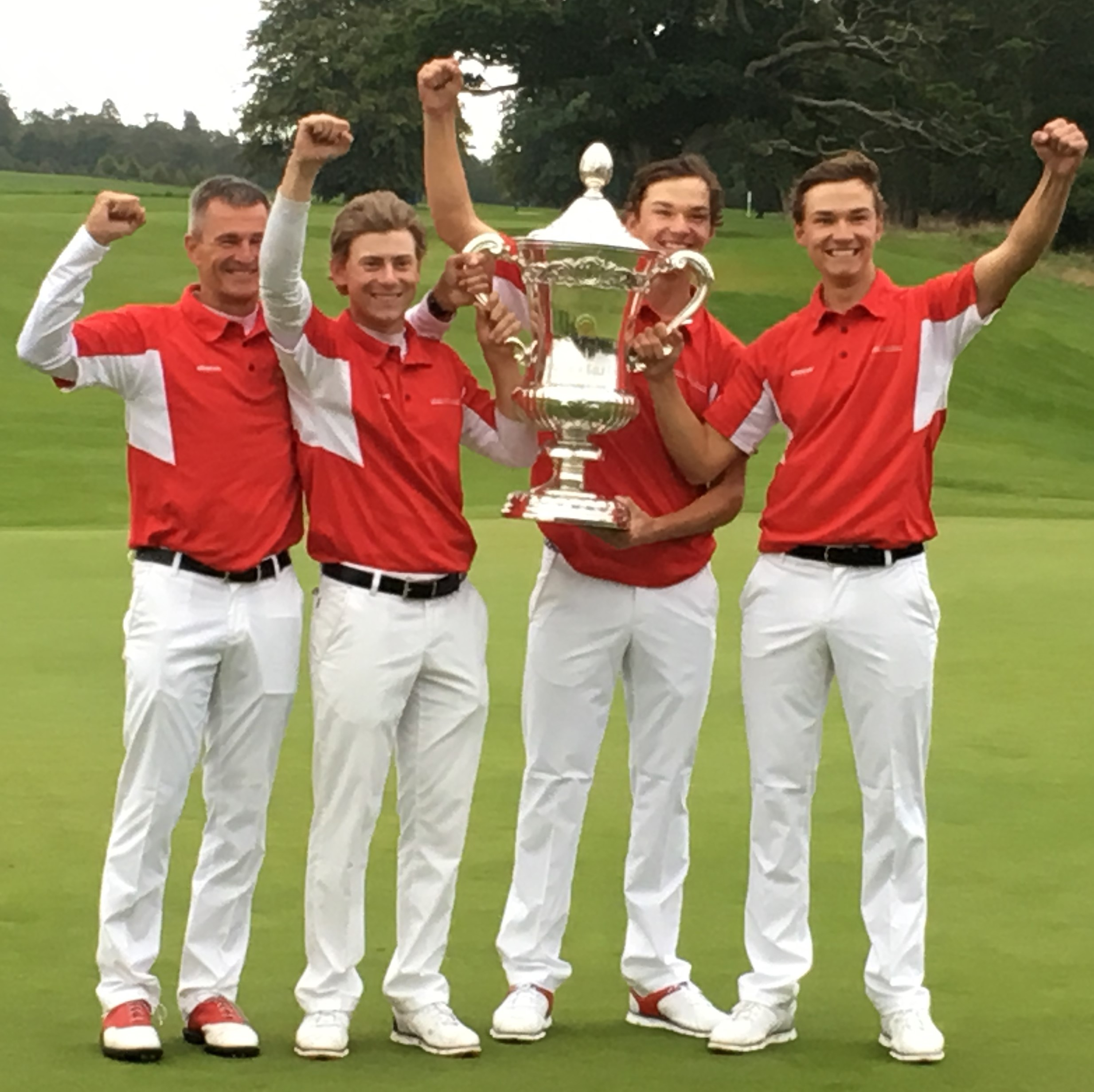
John Axelsen and twins Rasmus & Nicolai Højgaard won the 2018 Eisenhower Trophy

== See also ==
- Made in Denmark – the leading men's golf tournament in Denmark
