= 2016 European Amateur Team Championship =

Golf competition

Tournament information
- Dates: 5–9 July 2016
- Location: Paris, France; 49°12′20″N 2°29′00″E
- Course: Golf de Chantilly (Vineuil Course)
- Organized by: European Golf Association
- Format: Qualification round: 36 holes stroke play Knock-out match-play

Statistics
- Par: 71
- Length: 7,108 yards (6,500 m)
- Field: 16 teams 96 players

Champion
- Scotland; Grant Forrest, Craig Howie, Robert MacIntyre, Jamie Savage, Sandy Scott, Connor Syme
- Qualification round: 713 (+3); Final match: 5–2
- Location in Europe Location in France Location in Hauts-de-France

The 2016 European Amateur Team Championship took place 5–9 July at Golf de Chantilly, outside Paris, France. It was the 33rd men's golf European Amateur Team Championship.

== Venue ==
The hosting club, Golf de Chantilly, was founded in 1909. The Vineuil Course, situated in Chantilly, in the forest of the Hauts-de-France region of Northern France, 50 kilometres (30 miles) north of the center of Paris, close to the Château de Chantilly and Chantilly Racecourse, was originally designed by John Henry Taylor and later redesigned by Tom Simpson and Donald Steel. It had previously hosted eleven editions of the Open de France, the first in 1913 and the latest in 1990.

The championship course was set up with par 71.

== Format ==
Each team consisted of six players, playing two rounds of an opening stroke-play qualifying competition over two days, counting the five best scores each day for each team.

The eight best teams formed flight A, in knock-out match-play over the next three days. The teams were seeded based on their positions after the stroke play. The first placed team was drawn to play the quarter-final against the eight placed team, the second against the seventh, the third against the sixth and the fourth against the fifth. Teams were allowed to use six players during the team matches, selecting four of them in the two morning foursome games and five players in to the afternoon single games. Teams knocked out after the quarter-finals played one foursome game and four single games in each of their remaining matches. Games all square at the 18th hole were declared halved, if the team match was already decided.

The eight teams placed 9–16 in the qualification stroke-play formed flight B, to play similar knock-out play, with one foursome game and four single games in each match, to decide their final positions.

== Teams ==
16 nation teams contested the event. Portugal, Austria and Norway qualified by finishing first, second and third at the 2015 Division 2. Each team consisted of six players.

Players in the participating teams

Country	Players
Austria	Luca Denk, Markus Habeler, Lukas Lipold, Michael Ludwig, Markus Maukner, Matthias Schwab
Belgium	Alan de Bondt, Aurian Capart, Basile Devillet, Yente van Doren, Cedric Van Wassenhove, Gaeton Weydts-Caesens
Denmark	John Axelsen, Peter Launer Bæk, Alexander George Frances, Marcus Helligkilde, Jonathan Gøth-Rasmussen, Emil Sogaard
England	Jamie Bower, Adam Chapman, Scott Gregory, Bradley Moore, Marco Penge, Alfie Plant
Finland	Kim Koivu, Juuso Kahlos, Rasmus Karlson, Ilari Saulo, Otto Vanhatalo, Vaino Vitaharju
France	Ugo Coussaud, Thomas Perrot, Antoine Rozner, Gregoire Schoeb, Robin Sciot-Siergrist, Victor Veyret
Germany	Christian Braeunig, Hurly Long, Maximilian Mehles, Jeremy Paul, Yannik Paul, Thomas Rosenmüller
Ireland	Colm Campbell, Alex Gleeson, Jack Hume, Stuart Grehan, Paul McBride, Conor O'Rourke
Italy	Luca Cianchetti, Jacopo Vecchi Fossa, Stefano Mazzoli, Guido Migliozzi, Lorenzo Scalise, Federico Zucchetti
Netherlands	Max Albertus, Rowin Caron, Lars Keunen, Peter Meching, Lars Van Meijel, Vince Van Veen
Norway	Andreas Gjesteby, Viktor Hovland, Knud Andreas Krokeide, Aksel Olsen, Kristoffer Ventura, Jarle Volden
Portugal	Tomas Bessa, Afonso Girao, Joao Girao, Vitor Londot Lopes, Francisco Oliveira, Tomas Silva
Scotland	Grant Forrest, Craig Howie, Robert MacIntyre, Jamie Savage, Sandy Scott, Connor Syme
Spain	Iván Cantero, Manuel Elvira, Mario Galiano, Ángel Hidalgo, Alejandro del Rey, Javier Sainz
Sweden	Adam Blommé, Oskar Bergqvist, Martin Erikson, Robin Petersson, Fredrik Niléhn, Hannes Rönneblad
Switzerland	Jeremy Freiburghaus, Michael Harradine, Marco Iten, Loris Schupbach, Philippe Weppernig, Neal Woernhard

== Winners ==
Tied leaders of the opening 36-hole competition were host nation France and team Scotland, each with a 3-over-par score of 713. Team France earned first place on the tie breaking better non-counting scores. Eleven-time-winners England did not make it to the quarter-finals, finishing tenth. Sweden, tied 12th after the first round, was close to miss the quarter-finals, but finally, just like as at last year's championship, by a single stroke took the last place among the top eight teams. Sweden eventually came close to winning the championship.

There was no official award for the lowest individual score, but individual leader was Antoine Rozner, France, with a 6-under-par score of 136, one stroke ahead of John Axelsen, Denmark.

Defending champions team Scotland won the gold medal, earning their eighth title, beating team Sweden in the final 5–2. The final was decided when Scotland's 19-year-old, future European Tour winner, Robert McIntyre made a long putt for birdie on the 18th green in his single game against Sweden's Oskar Bergqvist.

Denmark earned the bronze on third place, after beating Italy 4 1/2–2 1/2 in the bronze match.

A second division, named European Amateur Championship Division 2, took place 6–9 July 2016 at Kikuoka GC, Luxembourg. The three best placed teams, Iceland, Wales and the Czech Republic, qualified for the 2017 European Amateur Team Championship.

The Netherlands, Portugal and Finland placed 14th, 15th and 16th in the first division and was moved to Division 2 for 2017.

== Results ==
Qualification round

Team standings

Place	Country	Score	To par
1	France *	359-354=713	+3
1	Scotland	357-355=713	+3
3	Italy	362-352=714	+4
4	Denmark	355-361=716	+6
5	Norway	358-360=718	+8
6	Ireland	365-355=720	+10
7	Spain	360-364=724	+14
8	Sweden	366-359=725	+15
9	Germany	356-370=726	+16
10	England	360-368=728	+18
T11	Belgium *	376-358=734	+24
T11	Finland	365-369=734	+24
13	Austria	369-368=737	+27
14	Portugal	374-365=740	+30
15	Switzerland	363-380=743	+33
16	Netherlands	375-381=756	+46

* Note: In the event of a tie the order was determined by the
best total of the two non-counting scores of the two rounds.

Individual leaders

Place	Player	Country	Score	To par
1	Antoine Rozner	France	68-68=136	−6
2	John Axelsen	Denmark	69-68=137	−5
3	Grant Forrest	Scotland	70-68=138	−4
3	Stuart Grehan	Ireland	70-68=138	−4
5	Kristoffer Ventura	Norway	67-72=139	−3
T6	Kim Koivu	Finland	67-73=140	−2
T6	Hurly Long	Germany	69-71=140	−2
T6	Tomas Silva	Portugal	71-69=140	−2
T9	Jack Hume	Ireland	73-68=141	−1
T9	Stefano Mazzoli	Italy	71-70=141	−1

Note: There was no official award for the lowest individual score.

Flight A

Bracket

Quarter finals
Sweden	4.5
France	2.5
Denmark	5.5
Norway	1.5
Italy	4.5
Ireland	2.5
Scotland	5.5
Spain	1.5

Semi finals
Sweden	4.5
Denmark	2.5
Italy	5
Scotland	2

Final
Scotland	5
Sweden	2
Bronze match
Denmark	4.5
Italy	2.5

Elimination matches
France	4
Norway	1
Ireland	3.5
Spain	1.5

Match for 5th place
France	4
Ireland	1
Match for 7th place
Norway	3.5
Spain	1.5

Final games

Scotland	Sweden
5	2
C. Syme / C. Howie 21st hole	M. Erikson / F. Niléhn
R. Macintyre / S. Scott	R. Petersson / H. Rönneblad 3 & 2
Robert Macintyre 1 up	Oskar Berqvist
Grant Forrest 5 & 4	Adam Blommé
Craig Howie AS *	Robin Petersson AS *
Connor Syme 4 & 3	Fredrik Niléhn
Sandy Scott AS *	Hannes Rönneblad AS *

* Note: Game declared halved, since team match already decided.

Flight B

Bracket

Round 1
Germany	3
Netherlands	2
Austria	3.5
Finland	1.5
Belgium	3.5
Portugal	1.5
Switzerland	3
England	2

Round 2
Germany	3.5
Austria	1.5
Belgium	3.5
Switzerland	1.5

Match for 9th place
Germany	3
Belgium	2
Match for 11th place
Austria	3
Switzerland	2

Elimination matches
Netherlands	3.5
Finland	1.5
England	4.5
Portugal	0.5

Match for 13th place
England	3.5
Netherlands	1.5
Match for 15th place
Portugal	3.5
Finland	1.5

Final standings

Place	Country
1st place, gold medalist(s)	Scotland
2nd place, silver medalist(s)	Sweden
3rd place, bronze medalist(s)	Denmark
4	Italy
5	France
6	Ireland
7	Norway
8	Spain
9	Germany
10	Belgium
11	Austria
12	Switzerland
13	England
14	Netherlands
15	Portugal
16	Finland

== See also ==
- Eisenhower Trophy – biennial world amateur team golf championship for men organized by the International Golf Federation.
- European Ladies' Team Championship – European amateur team golf championship for women organised by the European Golf Association.
