= 2018 European Amateur Team Championship =

Golf competition

Tournament information
- Dates: 10–14 July 2018
- Location: Bad Saarow, Germany; 52.239°N 14.029°E
- Course: Golf Club Bad Saarow (Faldo Course Berlin)
- Organized by: European Golf Association
- Format: Qualification round: 36 holes stroke play Knock-out match-play

Statistics
- Par: 72
- Length: 7,108 yards (6,500 m)
- Field: 16 teams 96 players

Champion
- Finland; Matias Honkala, Jonatan Jolkkonen, Santeri Lehesmaa, Veeti Mähönen, Aleksi Myllymäki, Sami Välimäki
- Qualification round: 718 (−2); Final match: 5–2
- Location in Europe Location in Germany Location in Brandenburg

The 2018 European Amateur Team Championship took place 10–14 July at the Bad Saarow Golf Club, on its Faldo Course Berlin, It was the 35th men's golf European Amateur Team Championship.

== Venue ==
The hosting course, designed by Sir Nick Faldo, located in Bad Saarow, Germany, 50 kilometres south-east of the city center of Berlin, opened in 1996. It had previously hosted the 2000 Eisenhower Trophy and Espirito Santo Trophy.

The championship course was set up with par 72.

== Format ==
Each team consisted of six players, playing two rounds of an opening stroke-play qualifying competition over two days, counting the five best scores each day for each team.

The eight best teams formed flight A, in knock-out match-play over the next three days. The teams were seeded based on their positions after the stroke play. The first placed team was drawn to play the quarter-final against the eight placed team, the second against the seventh, the third against the sixth and the fourth against the fifth. Teams were allowed to use six players during the team matches, selecting four of them in the two morning foursome games and five players in to the afternoon single games. Teams knocked out after the quarter-finals played one foursome game and four single games in each of their remaining matches. Games all square at the 18th hole were declared halved, if the team match was already decided.

The eight teams placed 9–16 in the qualification stroke-play formed flight B, to play similar knock-out play, with one foursome game and four single games in each match, to decide their final positions.

== Teams ==
16 nation teams contested the event. Finland, Portugal, the Netherlands and Serbia qualified by finishing first, second, third and fourth at the 2017 Division 2. Serbia, taking part for the first time, qualified since last year's silver medalist Norway did not take part. Each team consisted of six players.

Players in the teams

Country	Players
Austria	Luca Denk, Gerold Folk, Lukas Lipold, Oliver Rath, Niklas Regner, Maximilian Steinlechner
Czech Republic	Jakub Bares, Petr Janik, Vojtech Kostelka, Ondrej Melichar, Simon Zach, Jiri Zuska
Denmark	John Axelsen, Gustav Frimodt, Andreas Hillersborg Sorensen, Nicolai Højgaard, Rasmus Højgaard, Morten Toft Hansen
England	Todd Clements, David Hague, Matthew Jordan, Gian-Marco Petrozzi, Nick Poppleton, Mitch Waite
Finland	Matias Honkala, Jonatan Jolkkonen, Santeri Lehesmaa, Veeti Mähönen, Aleksi Myllymäki, Sami Välimäki
France	Edgar Catherine, Jérémy Gandon, Frédéric Lacroix, Adrien Pendaries, Hubert Tisserand, Victor Veyret
Germany	Jannik de Bruyn, Hurly Long, Marc Hammer, Falko Hanisch, Michael Hirmer, Timo Vahlenkamp
Iceland	Rúnar Arnórsson, Aron Snær Júlíusson, Bjarki Pétursson, Henning Darri Thordarson, Bjorn Oskar Gudjonsson, Gísli Sveinbergsson
Ireland	Robin Dawson, Alex Gleeson, Rowan Lester, John Murphy, Caolan Rafferty, Jonathan Yates
Italy	Alberto Castagnara, Giulio Castagnara, Francesco Donaggio, Giovanni Manzoni, Stefano Mazzoli, Lorenzo Scalise
Netherlands	Dario Antonisse, Koen Kouwenaar, Stan Kraai, Peter Melching, Nordin Van Tilburg, Vince Van Veen
Portugal	Pedro Clare Neves, Perdo Cruz Silva, João Girao, Pedro Lencart Silva, Vitor Londot Lopes, Daniel Rodrigues
Scotland	Stuart Easton, Ryan Lumsden, Euan McIntosh, Sandy Scott, Jamie Stewart, Euan Walker
Serbia	Dane Cvetkovic, Mihailo, Dimitrijevic, Branimir Gudelj, Ranko Helc, Marko Jokic, Sergej Stojiljkovic
Spain	Alejandro del Rey, Manuel Elvira, Ángel Hidalgo, Jorge Maicas, Adrián Mata, Victor Pastor
Sweden	Oliver Gillberg, David Nyfjäll, Pontus Nyholm, Jesper Svensson, Tim Widing, Ludvig Åberg

== Winners ==
Tied leaders of the opening 36-hole competition were team Sweden and team England, each with a 27-under-par score of 693, eleven strokes ahead of team Denmark. Sweden earned first place on the tie breaking better non-counting scores. Host country Germany, on fourth place, was another stroke behind.

There was no official award for the lowest individual score, but individual leader was Gian-Marco Petrozzi, England, with a 12-under-par score of 132, two strokes ahead of three players.

Team Finland won the gold medal, earning their first title, beating eleven-times-champion team England in the final 5–2. Team Finland finished 16th and last at the 2016 championship and was moved to the second division for 2017. They came back to the championship for 2018, finishing 8th at the initial qualifying competition and made the quarter-finals by a single stroke.

Denmark earned the bronze on third place, after beating host country Germany 5–2 in the bronze match.

Italy, Portugal and Serbia placed 14th, 15th and 16th and was moved to Division 2 for 2019, to be replaced by Belgium, Slovenia, and Wales, who finished first, second, and third respectively in the 2018 Division 2.

== Results ==
Qualification round

Team standings

Place	Country	Score	To par
T1	Sweden *	351-342=693	−27
T1	England	349-344=693	−27
3	Denmark	353-351=704	−16
4	Germany	360-345=705	−15
5	Spain	358-349=707	−13
6	Scotland	357-352=709	−11
7	France	353-358=711	−9
8	Finland	354-364=718	−2
9	Ireland	359-360=719	−1
10	Austria	367-355=722	+2
T11	Netherlands	356-367=723	+3
T11	Italy	367-356=723	+3
13	Iceland	360-370=730	+10
T14	Portugal *	370-361=731	+11
T14	Czech Republic	369-363=731	+11
16	Serbia	401-390=791	+71

* Note: In the event of a tie the order was determined by the
best total of the two non-counting scores of the two rounds.

Individual leaders

Place	Player	Country	Score	To par
1	Gian-Marco Petrozzi	England	62-70=132	−12
T2	Ángel Hidalgo	Spain	69-65=134	−10
T2	Hurly Long	Germany	71-63=134	−10
T2	Ludvig Åberg	Sweden	67-67=134	−10
T5	Matthew Jordan	England	69-66=135	−9
T5	John Murphy	Ireland	68-67=135	−9
T5	Lorenzo Filippo Scalise	Italy	65-70=135	−9
8	Nicolai Højgaard	Denmark	66-68=136	−8
T9	Marc Hammer	Germany	71-68=139	−5
T9	Matias Honkala	Finland	68-71=139	−5
T9	Frédéric Lacroix	France	67-72=139	−5
T9	Lukas Lipold	Austria	72-67=139	−5

Note: There was no official award for the lowest individual score.

Flight A

Bracket

Quarter finals
Finland	4
Sweden	3
Germany	4
Spain	3
Denmark	4.5
Scotland	2.5
England	6
France	1

Semi finals
Finland	4
Germany	3
England	4
Denmark	3

Final
Finland	5
England	2
Bronze match
Denmark	5
Germany	2

Elimination matches
Spain	3
Sweden	2
France	3.5
Scotland	1.5

Match for 5th place
France	3.5
Spain	1.5
Match for 7th place
Sweden	3
Scotland	2

Final games

Finland	England
5	2
M. Honkala / A. Myllymäki 2 & 1	M. Jordan / G.-M Petrozzi
S. Välimäki / V. Mähönen 5 & 4	D. Hague / N. Poppleton
Santeri Lehesmaa AS *	Matthew Jordan AS *
Matias Honkala 2 & 1	Mitch Waite
Sami Välimäki	G.-M. Petrozzi 2 & 1
Veeti Mähönen 2 & 1	Todd Clements
Aleksi Myllymäki AS *	David Hague AS *

* Note: Game declared halved, since team match already decided.

Flight B

Bracket

Round 1
Ireland	5
Serbia	0
Iceland	3
Italy	2
Netherlands	4.5
Portugal	0.5
Czech Republic	4.5
Austria	0.5

Round 2
Ireland	3.5
Iceland	1.5
Netherlands	4
Czech Republic	1

Match for 9th place
Netherlands	3
Ireland	2
Match for 11th place
Iceland	4
Czech Republic	1

Elimination matches
Italy	3
Serbia	2
Austria	4
Portugal	1

Match for 13th place
Austria	3
Italy	2
Match for 15th place
Portugal	4
Serbia	1

Final standings

Place	Country
1st place, gold medalist(s)	Finland
2nd place, silver medalist(s)	England
3rd place, bronze medalist(s)	Denmark
4	Germany
5	France
6	Spain
7	Sweden
8	Scotland
9	Netherlands
10	Ireland
11	Iceland
12	Czech Republic
13	Austria
14	Italy
15	Portugal
16	Serbia

== See also ==
- Eisenhower Trophy – biennial world amateur team golf championship for men organized by the International Golf Federation.
- European Ladies' Team Championship – European amateur team golf championship for women organised by the European Golf Association.
