= German Challenge =

Golf tournament

Tournament information
- Location: Neuburg an der Donau, Germany
- Established: 2021
- Course: Wittelsbacher Golf Club
- Par: 72
- Length: 7,479 yards (6,839 m)
- Tour: Challenge Tour
- Format: Stroke play
- Prize fund: €300,000
- Month played: July

Tournament record score
- Aggregate: 264 J. C. Ritchie (2025)
- To par: −24 as above

Current champion
- (Netherlands) Lars van der Vight

Location map
- Location in Germany Location in Bavaria

The German Challenge is a golf tournament on the Challenge Tour held at Wittelsbacher Golf Club in Neuburg an der Donau, Bavaria, Germany.

Title sponsor until 2025, Big Green Egg, signed a sponsorship agreement for the German Challenge through 2024.

== History ==
In the inaugural tournament, Ángel Hidalgo of Spain claimed his maiden Challenge Tour title by posting four consecutive rounds of 68, defying the odds after receiving a last-minute invite.

Fellow Spaniard Alejandro del Rey won the following year, beating Mateusz Gradecki with a birdie at the second extra playoff hole. Italian golfer Francesco Laporta won the 2023 edition, shooting even par in the final round to hang on and win by one stroke over four others.

== Winners ==
Year	Winner	Score	To par	Margin of victory	Runner(s)-up
German Challenge
2026	(Netherlands) Lars van der Vight	271	−17	1 stroke	(France) Julien Sale
2025	(South Africa) J. C. Ritchie	264	−24	8 strokes	(England) Joshua Berry (England) Tom Lewis
Big Green Egg German Challenge
2024	(Denmark) Rasmus Neergaard-Petersen	273	−15	1 stroke	(Denmark) John Axelsen (Scotland) Daniel Young
2023	(Italy) Francesco Laporta	281	−7	1 stroke	(England) Gary Boyd (England) Ashley Chesters (Germany) Dominic Foos (Czech Republic) Jiří Zuska
2022	(Spain) Alejandro del Rey	271	−17	Playoff	(Poland) Mateusz Gradecki
2021	(Spain) Ángel Hidalgo	272	−12	2 strokes	(Austria) Lukas Nemecz (Spain) Santiago Tarrío
