= 2020 Alps Tour =

Golf tour season

2020 Alps Tour season
- Duration: 18 February 2020 – 30 October 2020
- Number of official events: 9 (Note: A further ten tournaments were scheduled but were either cancelled or postponed.)
- Order of Merit: (Spain) Jordi García del Moral

The 2020 Alps Tour was the 20th season of the Alps Tour, a third-tier golf tour recognised by the European Tour.

== Schedule ==
The following table lists official events during the 2020 season.

Date	Tournament	Host country	Purse (€)	Winner (Note: The number in brackets after each winner's name is the number of Alps Tour events they had won up to and including that tournament. It is rare for someone to accumulate many wins on the Alps Tour as success at this level usually leads to promotion to the Challenge Tour.)	OWGR points
20 Feb	Ein Bay Open	Egypt	40,000	(Netherlands) Lars Keunen (1)	4
25 Feb	Red Sea Little Venice Open	Egypt	40,000	(Italy) Stefano Mazzoli (1)	4
~~2 May~~	Pelagone Open	Italy	–	Cancelled	–
~~19 Jun~~	Memorial Giorgio Bordoni	Italy	–	Cancelled	–
~~5 Jul~~	Saint-Malo Golf Mixed Open	France	–	Cancelled	–
~~11 Jul~~	Fred Olsen Alps de La Gomera	Spain	–	Cancelled	–
~~19 Jul~~	Sicilia Alps Open	Italy	–	Postponed	–
15 Aug	Gösser Open	Austria	40,000	(Austria) Lukas Nemecz (3)	4
4 Sep	Cervino Alps Open	Italy	40,000	(Spain) Jordi García del Moral (1)	4
13 Sep; ~~31 May~~	Open de la Mirabelle d'Or	France	43,000	(Spain) Alejandro del Rey (1)	4
19 Sep; ~~24 Oct~~	Toscana Alps Open	Italy	40,000	(Italy) Matteo Manassero (1)	4
25 Sep; ~~9 May~~	Alps de Andalucía	Spain	40,000	(Spain) Lucas Vacarisas (1)	4
~~26 Sep~~; ~~21 Mar~~	Allegria Open	Egypt	–	Postponed	–
~~1 Oct~~; ~~26 Mar~~	Dreamland Pyramids Open	Egypt	–	Postponed	–
2 Oct; ~~27 Jun~~	Alps de Las Castillas	Spain	40,000	(Spain) Jacobo Pastor (1)	4
~~6 Oct~~; ~~31 Mar~~	New Giza Open	Egypt	–	Postponed	–
~~17 Oct~~; ~~25 Apr~~	Abruzzo Alps Open	Italy	–	Postponed	–
30 Oct	Italy Alps Open	Italy	40,000	(Italy) Jacopo Vecchi Fossa (1)	4
~~7 Nov~~; ~~6 Jun~~	Open de Saint François Region Guadeloupe	Guadeloupe	–	Cancelled	–

== Order of Merit ==
The Order of Merit was based on tournament results during the season, calculated using a points-based system. The top three players on the Order of Merit earned status to play on the 2021 Challenge Tour.

Position	Player	Points	Status earned
1	(Spain) Jordi García del Moral	18,503	Promoted to Challenge Tour
2	(Spain) Lucas Vacarisas	14,976	Promoted to Challenge Tour
3	(France) Jeong-Weon Ko	14,557	Promoted to Challenge Tour
4	(Italy) Stefano Mazzoli	13,523	
5	(Spain) Ángel Hidalgo	11,245	
6	(England) Sam Robinson	10,533	
7	(Netherlands) Lars Keunen	10,491	
8	(Republic of Ireland) Jonathan Yates	10,203	
9	(Italy) Jacopo Vecchi Fossa	9,883	
10	(Spain) Jacobo Pastor	9,812	
