= 2022 Nordic Golf League =

Golf tour season

2022 Nordic Golf League season
- Duration: 18 February 2022 – 21 October 2022
- Number of official events: 27
- Most wins: (Denmark) Jeppe Kristian Andersen (3) (Denmark) John Axelsen (3)
- Order of Merit: (Denmark) John Axelsen

The 2022 Nordic Golf League was the 24th season of the Nordic Golf League, a third-tier tour recognised by the European Tour.

== Schedule ==
The following table lists official events during the 2022 season.

Date	Tournament	Host country	Purse	Winner (Note: The number in brackets after each winner's name is the number of Nordic Golf League events they had won up to and including that tournament. It is rare for someone to accumulate many wins on the Nordic Golf League as success at this level usually leads to promotion to the Challenge Tour.)	OWGR points
20 Feb	GolfStar Winter Series I	Spain	SKr 615,000	(Denmark) John Axelsen (2)	4
24 Feb	GolfStar Winter Series II	Spain	SKr 615,000	(Sweden) Marcus Kinhult (1)	4
1 Mar	ECCO Tour Spanish Masters	Spain	€50,000	(Denmark) Sebastian Friedrichsen (1)	4
5 Mar	PGA Catalunya Resort Championship	Spain	€50,000	(Denmark) Jeppe Kristian Andersen (1)	4
29 Apr	Bravo Tours Open	Denmark	€35,000	(Denmark) Frederik Birkelund (a) (1)	4
6 May	Barncancerfonden Open	Sweden	SKr 450,000	(Denmark) Nicolai Tinning (4)	4
12 May	Rewell Elisefarm Challenge	Sweden	SKr 450,000	(Iceland) Axel Bóasson (3)	4
20 May	Stora Hotellet Fjällbacka Open	Sweden	SKr 450,000	(Sweden) Simon Forsström (2)	4
26 May	Moss & Rygge Open	Norway	NKr 450,000	(Denmark) August Thor Høst (1)	4
3 Jun	Thisted Forsikring Championship	Denmark	€35,000	(Denmark) Nicolai Nøhr Madsen (2)	4
10 Jun	Thomas Bjørn Samsø Classic	Denmark	€30,000	(Denmark) Mathias Gladbjerg (3)	4
18 Jun	Junet Open	Sweden	SKr 450,000	(Sweden) Jesper Hagborg Asp (1)	4
24 Jun	UNICEF Championship	Denmark	€35,000	(Denmark) Christian Jacobsen (1)	4
2 Jul	PGA Championship Landeryd Masters	Sweden	SKr 600,000	(Sweden) Rasmus Holmberg (1)	6
8 Jul	Big Green Egg Swedish Matchplay Championship	Sweden	SKr 450,000	(Denmark) Mathias Gladbjerg (4)	6
28 Jul	Holtsmark Open	Norway	NKr 450,000	(Sweden) Tobias Ruth (2)	4
5 Aug	Göteborg Open	Sweden	SKr 450,000	(Denmark) Jeppe Kristian Andersen (2)	4
13 Aug	Timberwise Finnish Open	Finland	€50,000	(Sweden) Viktor Edin (1)	0.45
20 Aug	Esbjerg Open	Denmark	€35,000	(Denmark) Christian Jacobsen (2)	0.72
2 Sep	Greatdays Trophy	Sweden	SKr 450,000	(Sweden) Rasmus Holmberg (2)	0.70
9 Sep	BMW Onsjö Open	Sweden	SKr 450,000	(Denmark) Frederik Severin Tøttenborg (1)	1.02
16 Sep	Trust Forsikring Championship	Denmark	€35,000	(Denmark) August Thor Høst (2)	1.00
23 Sep	Great Northern Challenge	Denmark	DKr 500,000	(Denmark) Frederik Birkelund (a) (2)	1.17
29 Sep	Gumbalde Open	Sweden	SKr 450,000	(Sweden) Adam Andersson (1)	0.69
7 Oct	Race to HimmerLand	Denmark	€40,000	(Denmark) John Axelsen (3)	1.06
14 Oct	MoreGolf Mastercard Tour Final	Sweden	SKr 550,000	(Denmark) John Axelsen (4)	0.89
21 Oct	Sydbank Road to Europe Final	Denmark	€30,000	(Denmark) Jeppe Kristian Andersen (3)	0.77

== Order of Merit ==
The Order of Merit was titled as the GolfBox Road to Europe and was based on tournament results during the season, calculated using a points-based system. The top five players on the Order of Merit (not otherwise exempt) earned status to play on the 2023 Challenge Tour.

Position	Player	Points	Status earned
1	(Denmark) John Axelsen	53,303	Qualified for European Tour (Top 25 in Q School)
2	(Sweden) Simon Forsström	51,979	Qualified for European Tour (Top 25 in Q School)
3	(Denmark) Jeppe Kristian Andersen	50,990	Promoted to Challenge Tour
4	(Denmark) Frederik Birkelund	42,348	Promoted to Challenge Tour
5	(Denmark) Sebastian Friedrichsen	39,267	Promoted to Challenge Tour
6	(Denmark) Hamish Brown	38,912	Promoted to Challenge Tour
7	(Denmark) Nicolai Tinning	38,771	Promoted to Challenge Tour
8	(Sweden) Martin Eriksson	32,524	
9	(Sweden) Rasmus Holmberg	27,304	
10	(Denmark) August Thor Høst	26,094	

== See also ==
- 2022 Danish Golf Tour
- 2022 Swedish Golf Tour
