= Lorenzo Scalise =

Italian professional golfer (born 2000)

Personal information
- Full name: Lorenzo Filippo Scalise
- Nationality: Italy
- Born: 18 July 1995 (age 31) Milan, Italy

Career
- Sport: Golf
- College: University of Tennessee
- Turned professional: 2018
- Current tour: Challenge Tour
- Former tours: European Tour; Alps Tour
- Professional wins: 2

Number of wins by tour
- Challenge Tour: 1
- Other: 1

Lorenzo Scalise (born 18 July 1995) is an Italian professional golfer who plays on the Challenge Tour. He won the 2023 Kaskáda Golf Challenge.

== Early life and amateur career ==
Scalise was born in Milan in 1995 and enjoyed a stellar amateur career. He was runner-up at the 2013 Italian Stroke Play (Franco Bevione Trophy), the 2015 Italian Amateur Match Play (Giuseppe Silva Trophy), and the 2015 German International Amateur. In 2017, he won the Italian Amateur Stroke Play Championship (Franco Bevione Trophy) and lost a playoff to Alfie Plant for the 2017 European Amateur at Walton Heath.

In 2015, he finished tied 11th at 72nd Italian Open, only 3 strokes behind winner Rikard Karlberg, setting a new record for best performance by an amateur at the event, a record previously held by Francesco Molinari who finished tied 13th. He was low amateur again at the 2017 Italian Open.

Scalise represented Italy internationally starting in 2013. Alongside Giovanni Manzoni and Stefano Mazzoli, his team finished 5th at the 2018 Eisenhower Trophy.

Scalise attended the University of Tennessee from 2014 to 2018, and was named SEC Men's Golfer of the Week and Second-Team All-American as a senior.

== Professional career ==
Scalise turned professional in late 2018 and joined the 2019 Alps Tour, where he in April secured his maiden professional victory in Egypt. In June, he lost at playoff to Matthew Jordan at the Italian Challenge.

Scalise earned a Challenge Tour card for 2020 after finishing tied 34th at Q-School. 14 of his 19 starts in 2020 were on the European Tour, where he made 7 cuts and recorded a best finish of tied 15th at the South African Open.

In 2021, he was runner-up at the Kaskáda Golf Challenge, and in 2022 he tied for 3rd at the Italian Challenge Open.

Scalise enjoyed a good season in 2023. He won the Kaskáda Golf Challenge, was runner-up at the Open de Portugal 4 strokes behind Marco Penge, and recorded four further top-5 finishes to end the season 7th in the rankings, and graduate to the European Tour for 2024. His best finish of 2024 was a tie for 11th at the Magical Kenya Open, and he returned to the Challenge Tour.

== Amateur wins ==
- 2017 Italian Amateur Stroke Play Championship - Franco Bevione Trophy

== Professional wins (2) ==
=== Challenge Tour wins (1) ===
| No. | Date | Tournament | Winning score | Margin of victory | Runner-up |
|---|---|---|---|---|---|
| 1 | 18 Jun 2023 | Kaskáda Golf Challenge | −12 (64-68-70-70=272) | 3 strokes | (Spain) Manuel Elvira |

Challenge Tour playoff record (0–1)

| No. | Year | Tournament | Opponent | Result |
|---|---|---|---|---|
| 1 | 2019 | Italian Challenge Open Eneos Motor Oil | (England) Matthew Jordan | Lost to par on first extra hole |

=== Alps Tour wins (1) ===
| No. | Date | Tournament | Winning score | Margin of victory | Runners-up |
|---|---|---|---|---|---|
| 1 | 1 Apr 2019 | New Giza Open | −12 (68-66-70=204) | 1 stroke | (Netherlands) Lars Keunen, (Spain) Xavi Puig |

== Team appearances ==
Amateur

- European Boys' Team Championship (representing Italy): 2013
- European Nations Cup – Copa Sotogrande (representing Italy): 2014
- European Amateur Team Championship (representing Italy): 2015, 2016, 2017, 2018
- Eisenhower Trophy (representing Italy): 2018
- Arnold Palmer Cup (representing International team): 2018
- St Andrews Trophy (representing continental Europe team): 2018 (winners)

== See also ==
- List of International Arnold Palmer Cup golfers
- 2023 Challenge Tour graduates
