= 2022 Swedish Golf Tour =

Golf tour season

2022 Swedish Golf Tour season
- Duration: 18 February 2022 – 14 October 2022
- Number of official events: 15
- Order of Merit: (Denmark) John Axelsen

The 2022 Swedish Golf Tour, titled as the 2022 MoreGolf Mastercard Tour for sponsorship reasons, was the 39th season of the Swedish Golf Tour, the main professional golf tour in Sweden since it was formed in 1984, with most tournaments being incorporated into the Nordic Golf League since 1999.

== Schedule ==
The following table lists official events during the 2022 season.

Date	Tournament	Location	Purse (SKr)	Winner (Note: The number in brackets after each winner's name is the number of Swedish Golf Tour events they had won up to and including that tournament. As most Swedish Golf Tour events are incorporated into the Nordic Golf League schedule, details of these wins are displayed there instead.)	Main tour (Note: NGL − Nordic Golf League.)
20 Feb	GolfStar Winter Series I	Spain	615,000	(Denmark) John Axelsen	NGL
24 Feb	GolfStar Winter Series II	Spain	615,000	(Sweden) Marcus Kinhult	NGL
6 May	Barncancerfonden Open	Halland	450,000	(Denmark) Nicolai Tinning	NGL
12 May	Rewell Elisefarm Challenge	Skåne	450,000	(Iceland) Axel Bóasson	NGL
20 May	Stora Hotellet Fjällbacka Open	Bohuslän	450,000	(Sweden) Simon Forsström	NGL
26 May	Moss & Rygge Open	Norway	NKr 450,000	(Denmark) August Thor Høst	NGL
17 Jun	Junet Open	Småland	450,000	(Sweden) Jesper Hagborg Asp	NGL
2 Jul	PGA Championship Landeryd Masters	Östergötland	600,000	(Sweden) Rasmus Holmberg	NGL
8 Jul	Big Green Egg Swedish Matchplay Championship	Uppland	450,000	(Denmark) Mathias Gladbjerg	NGL
28 Jul	Holtsmark Open	Norway	NKr 450,000	(Sweden) Tobias Ruth	NGL
5 Aug	Göteborg Open	Västergötland	450,000	(Denmark) Jeppe Kristian Andersen	NGL
2 Sep	Greatdays Trophy	Uppland	450,000	(Sweden) Rasmus Holmberg	NGL
9 Sep	BMW Onsjö Open	Västergötland	450,000	(Denmark) Frederik Severin Tøttenborg	NGL
29 Sep	Gumbalde Open	Gotland	450,000	(Sweden) Adam Andersson	NGL
14 Oct	MoreGolf Mastercard Tour Final	Skåne	550,000	(Denmark) John Axelsen	NGL

== Order of Merit ==
The Order of Merit was titled as the MoreGolf Mastercard Tour Ranking and was based on tournament results during the season, calculated using a points-based system.

Position	Player	Points
1	(Denmark) John Axelsen	362,675
2	(Sweden) Simon Forsström	266,818
3	(Sweden) Rasmus Holmberg	245,071
4	(Denmark) Hamish Brown	219,802
5	(Denmark) Nicolai Tinning	217,574

== See also ==
- 2022 Danish Golf Tour
- 2022 Swedish Golf Tour (women)
