= 2022 European Tour Qualifying School graduates =

Golf qualifying tournament in Spain

2022 European Tour Qualifying School Final Stage
Tournament information
- Dates: 11–16 November 2022
- Location: Tarragona, Spain; 41.0798°N 1.1615°E
- Courses: Infinitum Golf (Lakes & Hills Courses)
- Tours: European Tour (unofficial event)

Statistics
- Par: 71 (L); 72 (H)
- Length: 7,001 yards (6,402 m) (L); 6,956 yards (6,361 m) (H)
- Field: 156, 72 after cut
- Cut: 281 (−5)
- Prize fund: €180,000
- Winner's share: €18,000

Champion
- (Sweden) Simon Forsström
- 399 (−29)

Location map
- Location in Spain Location in Catalonia

The 2022 European Tour Qualifying School graduates were determined following the conclusion of the 2022 European Tour (DP World Tour) Qualifying School Final Stage which was played 11–16 November at Infinitum Golf in Tarragona, Spain. It was the 45th edition of the European Tour Qualifying School. The top 25 and ties (28 in total) earned status to play on the 2023 European Tour, with the remaining players who finished outside the top 25 and ties, but having made the 72-hole cut, earning status to play on the 2023 Challenge Tour.

Simon Forsström won the event, scoring a six-round total of 399 (29 under par).

It was also the first time since 2019 that European Tour Qualifying School had been staged, having not been staged in 2020 and 2021 due to the COVID-19 pandemic.

Graduates who went on to win on the European Tour in 2023 included Marcel Siem at the Hero Indian Open, Nick Bachem at the Jonsson Workwear Open, Simon Forsström at the Soudal Open, Dan Brown at the ISPS Handa World Invitational and Ryo Hisatsune at the Cazoo Open de France.

== Results ==
The top 25 players (including ties) earned status to play on the 2023 European Tour. They were as follows:

Place	Player	Score	To par
1	(Sweden) Simon Forsström	66-69-65-65-66-68=399	−29
2	(France) David Ravetto	67-69-72-64-65-64=401	−27
3	(England) Dan Brown	67-67-68-65-66-69=402	−26
4	(Thailand) Kiradech Aphibarnrat	69-64-73-62-67-68=403	−25
5	(Spain) Alejandro del Rey	69-68-68-68-68-63=404	−24
6	(Germany) Nick Bachem	76-61-69-65-68-66=405	−23
T7	(Japan) Ryo Hisatsune	66-69-72-65-66-68=406	−22
T7	(Denmark) Christoffer Bring	71-68-72-61-65-69=406	−22
T7	(Denmark) John Axelsen	72-63-67-69-66-69=406	−22
T7	(Portugal) Pedro Figueiredo	69-67-70-65-64-71=406	−22
11	(Sweden) Tobias Edén	76-68-61-67-66-69=407	−21
12	(France) Joël Stalter	68-68-69-63-71-69=408	−20
T13	(England) Sam Hutsby	71-67-66-70-67-68=409	−19
T13	(United States) Gunner Wiebe	73-64-71-66-66-69=409	−19
T13	(Republic of Ireland) Gary Hurley	70-65-70-65-70-69=409	−19
T13	(United States) Joshua Lee	71-69-70-62-67-70=409	−19
T13	(France) Mike Lorenzo-Vera	66-73-70-64-65-71=409	−19
T13	(Germany) Marcel Siem	69-72-67-64-66-71=409	−19
T19	(Sweden) Jens Fahrbring	71-68-71-65-69-66=410	−18
T19	(England) David Horsey	70-70-69-65-68-68=410	−18
T19	(Iceland) Guðmundur Kristjánsson	70-64-73-66-67-70=410	−18
T19	(France) Gary Stal	72-69-67-65-66-71=410	−18
T23	(Republic of Ireland) John Murphy	68-69-73-67-69-65=411	−17
T23	(France) Adrien Saddier	71-69-70-68-66-67=411	−17
T23	(England) Garrick Porteous	71-66-70-67-69-68=411	−17
T23	(England) Andrew Wilson	70-69-71-67-65-69=411	−17
T23	(Portugal) Ricardo Santos	73-67-67-67-68-69=411	−17
T23	(Sweden) Niklas Lemke	72-66-65-66-71-71=411	−17

The following players made the 72 hole cut, however finished outside the top 25 and ties, therefore earning status to play on the 2023 Challenge Tour.

- (Italy) Renato Paratore (T29)
- (Wales) Oliver Farr (T29)
- (Denmark) Nicolai Kristensen (T29)
- (England) Ross McGowan (T32)
- (England) Oliver Farrell (T32)
- (Norway) Elias Bertheussen (T32)
- (Belgium) Christopher Mivis (T35)
- (England) Tom Murray (T35)
- (South Africa) Jaco Prinsloo (T35)
- (Japan) Takumi Kanaya (T35)
- (Sweden) Henric Sturehed (T35)
- (Germany) Maximilian Schmitt (T35)
- (England) Marco Penge (T35)
- (Italy) Lorenzo Scalise (T35)
- (Chile) Felipe Aguilar (T43)
- (England) Tom Lewis (T43)
- (England) Pavan Sagoo (T43)
- (England) Daniel O'Laughlin (T43)
- (England) Sam Bairstow (T43)
- (England) Chris Wood (T43)
- (Spain) Manuel Elvira (T43)
- (France) Clément Berardo (T43)
- (Denmark) Benjamin Poke (T51)
- (England) Chris Paisley (T51)
- (Poland) Mateusz Gradecki (T51)
- (Australia) Jordan Zunic (T51)
- (England) Callan Barrow (T51)
- (United States) Derek Ackerman (T56)
- (Scotland) Craig Howie (T56)
- (Germany) Velten Meyer (T56)
- (China) Liu Yanwei (T56)
- (France) Ugo Coussaud (T56)
- (Switzerland) Benjamin Rusch (T56)
- (Spain) Alejandro Cañizares (T62)
- (Australia) Jarryd Felton (T62)
- (Australia) Maverick Antcliff (T62)
- (Australia) Dimitrios Papadatos (65)
- (Scotland) Liam Johnston (T66)
- (South Africa) Keenan Davidse (T66)
- (England) Gary Boyd (T68)
- (Sweden) Mikael Lundberg (T68)
- (England) Oliver Fisher (70)
- (England) Ashley Chesters (WD)
- (Portugal) Ricardo Gouveia (WD)

== Graduates ==
Place	Player	Career ET starts	Cuts made	Best finish
1	(Sweden) Simon Forsström (Note: European Tour rookie in 2023)	9	3	T15
2	(France) David Ravetto	3	1	T68
3	(England) Dan Brown	1	0	CUT
4	(Thailand) Kiradech Aphibarnrat	183	119	Win (x4)
5	(Spain) Alejandro del Rey (Note: First-time full European Tour member in 2023, but ineligible for rookie status)	13	5	T9
6	(Germany) Nick Bachem	2	0	CUT
T7	(Japan) Ryo Hisatsune	1	0	CUT
T7	(Denmark) Christoffer Bring	3	1	T22
T7	(Denmark) John Axelsen	4	3	T17
T7	(Portugal) Pedro Figueiredo	99	36	T9
11	(Sweden) Tobias Edén	1	0	CUT
12	(France) Joël Stalter	106	38	Win
T13	(England) Sam Hutsby	99	42	4th
T13	(United States) Gunner Wiebe	1	1	T47
T13	(Republic of Ireland) Gary Hurley	14	5	T23
T13	(United States) Joshua Lee	0	0	n/a
T13	(France) Mike Lorenzo-Vera	245	148	2nd/T2
T13	(Germany) Marcel Siem	495	290	Win (x4)
T19	(Sweden) Jens Fahrbring	85	41	T3
T19	(England) David Horsey	365	227	Win (x4)
T19	(Iceland) Guðmundur Kristjánsson	6	2	T18
T19	(France) Gary Stal	136	71	Win
T23	(Republic of Ireland) John Murphy	6	2	T9
T23	(France) Adrien Saddier	138	72	3rd
T23	(England) Garrick Porteous	90	39	T4
T23	(England) Andrew Wilson	33	13	T3
T23	(Portugal) Ricardo Santos	203	99	Win
T23	(Sweden) Niklas Lemke	113	51	3rd/T3

=== 2023 European Tour results ===
Player	Starts	Cuts made	Best finish	R2D rank	Prize money (€)
(Sweden) Simon Forsström	29	19	Win	56	626,218
(France) David Ravetto (Note: Ravetto, Aphibarnrat, Figueiredo, Porteous and Wilson retained their European Tour cards for 2024 by finishing inside the top 25 (including ties) at the 2023 European Tour Qualifying School.)	29	13	T9	132	265,272
(England) Dan Brown	28	24	Win	50	741,789
(Thailand) Kiradech Aphibarnrat	19	7	T5	149	198,780
(Spain) Alejandro del Rey	27	21	T3	86	437,667
(Germany) Nick Bachem	28	15	Win	59	665,577
(Japan) Ryo Hisatsune	27	20	Win	17	1,416,758
(Denmark) Christoffer Bring	25	7	T13	169	118,016
(Denmark) John Axelsen	29	14	T6	118	284,799
(Portugal) Pedro Figueiredo	25	13	T14	152	178,315
(Sweden) Tobias Edén	20	1	T71	315	2,700
(France) Joël Stalter	21	6	T23	190	52,595
(England) Sam Hutsby	15	3	T51	250	14,305
(United States) Gunner Wiebe	26	7	T2	110	366,207
(Republic of Ireland) Gary Hurley	12	4	T14	198	41,259
(United States) Joshua Lee	26	9	T17	188	62,847
(France) Mike Lorenzo-Vera	20	13	T4	113	326,107
(Germany) Marcel Siem	29	23	Win	24	1,232,572
(Sweden) Jens Fahrbring	9	5	3rd	164	120,366
(England) David Horsey	15	3	T24	218	36,725
(Iceland) Guðmundur Kristjánsson	22	6	T24	187	64,018
(France) Gary Stal	20	6	T44	205	33,113
(Republic of Ireland) John Murphy	23	3	T28	209	32,488
(France) Adrien Saddier	20	14	T3	87	457,970
(England) Garrick Porteous	16	3	T31	219	28,571
(England) Andrew Wilson	18	10	T10	156	165,768
(Portugal) Ricardo Santos	15	8	11th	167	111,968
(Sweden) Niklas Lemke	15	7	T17	166	115,566

T = Tied
Player retained his European Tour card for 2024 (finished inside the top 116)
Player did not retain his European Tour card for 2024, but retained conditional status (finished between 117 and 131, inclusive)
Player did not retain his European Tour card for 2024 (finished outside the top 131)

=== 2023 European Tour winners ===
No.	Date	Player	Tournament	Winning score	Margin of victory	Runner(s)-up
1	26 Feb	(Germany) Marcel Siem	Hero Indian Open	−14 (69-70-67-68=274)	1 stroke	(Germany) Yannik Paul
2	26 Mar	(Germany) Nick Bachem	Jonsson Workwear Open	−24 (65-66-69-64=264)	4 strokes	(South Africa) Hennie du Plessis (South Africa) Zander Lombard
3	14 May	(Sweden) Simon Forsström	Soudal Open	−17 (64-67-67-69=267)	1 stroke	(Sweden) Jens Dantorp
4	20 Aug	(England) Dan Brown	ISPS Handa World Invitational	−15 (64-66-67-69=266)	5 strokes	(England) Alex Fitzpatrick
5	24 Sep	(Japan) Ryo Hisatsune	Cazoo Open de France	−14 (66-69-69-66=270)	2 strokes	(England) Jordan Smith (Denmark) Jeff Winther

=== 2023 European Tour runner-up finishes ===
No.	Date	Player	Tournament	Winner	Winning score	Runner-up score
1	27 Nov 2022	(Japan) Ryo Hisatsune	Fortinet Australian PGA Championship	(Australia) Cameron Smith	−14 (68-65-69-68=270)	−11 (67-70-71-65=273)
2	4 Jun 2023	(Germany) Marcel Siem	Porsche European Open	(Northern Ireland) Tom McKibbin	−9 (72-69-72-70=283)	−7 (71-73-70-71=285)
3	2 Jul	(United States) Gunner Wiebe	Betfred British Masters	(New Zealand) Daniel Hillier	−10 (72-71-69-66=278)	−8 (73-71-70-66=280)

== See also ==
- 2022 Challenge Tour graduates
