= Ángel Hidalgo =

Spanish professional golfer

Personal information
- Full name: Ángel Hidalgo Portillo
- Nationality: Spain
- Born: 28 April 1998 (age 28) Marbella, Spain

Career
- Sport: Golf
- Turned professional: 2018
- Current tour: European Tour
- Former tours: Challenge Tour; Alps Tour
- Professional wins: 4

Number of wins by tour
- European Tour: 1
- Challenge Tour: 1
- Other: 2

Best results in major championships
- Masters Tournament: DNP
- PGA Championship: DNP
- U.S. Open: T53: 2026
- The Open Championship: CUT: 2024, 2025

Ángel Hidalgo Portillo (born 28 April 1998) is a Spanish professional golfer and European Tour player. He won the 2024 Acciona Open de España for his first DP World Tour title. He won the 2021 German Challenge on the Challenge Tour.

== Amateur career ==
Hidalgo was born in Marbella, Andalusia, and played golf at Real Club de Golf Guadalmina, encouraged by his grandfather and father, also named Ángel and a golf professional.

Hidalgo had a successful amateur career, winning the Spanish Amateur in 2016 and 2018. He was part of the Spanish National Team and represented his country at the European Amateur Team Championship three times, winning the event in 2017.

In 2018, he played for Europe in the Bonallack Trophy in Qatar and at the St Andrews Trophy in Finland, where Hidalgo, who was three-down after five holes in his match against Todd Clements, clawed his way to victory helping the Continent of Europe claim the trophy for the first time since 2012 and for the sixth time in the match's history.

Hidalgo won the bronze for Spain at the 2018 Eisenhower Trophy in Ireland, together with Alejandro del Rey and Victor Pastor.

== Professional career ==
Hidalgo turned professional in 2018 and started playing on the Alps Tour and the Challenge Tour in 2019.

On the Alps Tour, he was runner-up at the 2020 Toscana Alps Open, one stroke behind Matteo Manassero, before winning the Ein Bay Open and the Memorial Giorgio Bordoni in 2021.

In 2021, he was 3rd at the Sydbank Esbjerg Challenge, ahead of earning his first Challenge Tour title at the 2021 Big Green Egg German Challenge, finishing two strokes clear of Lukas Nemecz and compatriot Santiago Tarrío.

Playing mainly on the European Tour in 2022, he shot a 63 in the opening round of the Estrella Damm N.A. Andalucía Masters at Valderrama to share the lead. He carded eight birdies, and narrowly failed to chip in for another on his final hole which would have seen him equal Bernhard Langer's 28-year-old course record. He finished solo 4th in the tournament, to finish 91st in the season rankings and secure his card for 2023.

In September, Hidalgo won the Acciona Open de España, beating Jon Rahm in a playoff to claim his first European Tour title.

== Amateur wins ==
- 2016 Campeonato de Espana Amateur, Campeonato Internacional de Andalucia U25, Memorial Norberto Goizueta, Campeonato Internacional de Espana U18, Copa Nacional Puerta de Hierro
- 2017 Campeonato Absoluto de las Comunidad Valenciana, Memorial Norberto Goizueta
- 2018 Copa de Andalucia, Campeonato de Espana Amateur

== Professional wins (4) ==
=== European Tour wins (1) ===
No.	Date	Tournament	Winning score	Margin of victory	Runner-up
1	29 Sep 2024	Acciona Open de España	−14 (65-67-68-70=270)	Playoff	(Spain) Jon Rahm

European Tour playoff record (1–0)

No.	Year	Tournament	Opponent	Result
1	2024	Acciona Open de España	(Spain) Jon Rahm	Won with birdie on second extra hole

=== Challenge Tour wins (1) ===
No.	Date	Tournament	Winning score	Margin of victory	Runners-up
1	12 Sep 2021	Big Green Egg German Challenge	−12 (68-68-68-68=272)	2 strokes	(Austria) Lukas Nemecz, (Spain) Santiago Tarrío

=== Alps Tour wins (2) ===
No.	Date	Tournament	Winning score	Margin of victory	Runner(s)-up
1	21 May 2021	Ein Bay Open	−14 (64-70-68=202)	Playoff	(France) Pierre Pineau
2	20 Jun 2021	Memorial Giorgio Bordoni	−20 (66-63-67=196)	1 stroke	(Italy) Giovanni Manzoni, (Italy) Leonardo Rigamonti

== Results in major championships ==
Tournament	2024	2025	2026
Masters Tournament			
PGA Championship			
U.S. Open			T53
The Open Championship	CUT	CUT	

Did not play

CUT = missed the half-way cut
"T" = tied

== Team appearances ==
Amateur

- European Amateur Team Championship (representing Spain): 2016, 2017 (winners), 2018
- Bonallack Trophy (representing Europe): 2018
- St Andrews Trophy (representing the Continent of Europe): 2018 (winners)
- Eisenhower Trophy (representing Spain): 2018
