= Ryo Hisatsune =

Japanese professional golfer (born 2002)

Ryo Hisatsune 久常 涼
Personal information
- Nationality: Japan
- Born: 9 September 2002 (age 24) Okayama, Japan
- Height: 175 cm (5 ft 9 in)
- Weight: 75 kg (165 lb; 11.8 st)

Career
- Sport: Golf
- Turned professional: 2020
- Current tour: PGA Tour
- Former tours: European Tour; Japan Golf Tour; Asian Tour; Japan Challenge Tour
- Professional wins: 4
- Highest ranking: 55 (5 April 2026) (as of 25 October 2026)

Number of wins by tour
- European Tour: 1
- Other: 3

Best results in major championships
- Masters Tournament: CUT: 2024
- PGA Championship: T18: 2024
- U.S. Open: T43: 2026
- The Open Championship: T53: 2026

Achievements and awards
- Japan Challenge Tour money list winner: 2020–21
- Sir Henry Cotton Rookie of the Year: 2023

Ryo Hisatsune (Japanese: 久常 涼, born 9 September 2002) is a Japanese professional golfer, who plays on the PGA Tour. He won the 2023 Cazoo Open de France.

== Professional career ==
Hisatsune turned professional in 2020. He played on the Japan Challenge Tour in 2020 and 2021, winning three times and claiming the money list title. He played on the Japan Golf Tour for the 2022 season, with a best result of tied-second coming at the ASO Iizuka Challenged Golf Tournament.

In November 2022, Hisatsune entered the European Tour Qualifying School. He finished tied-seventh, earning status to play on the 2023 European Tour season. Two weeks later, he finished tied-second at the Fortinet Australian PGA Championship, three shots behind Cameron Smith.

In September 2023, Hisatsune claimed his first win on the European Tour, winning the Cazoo Open de France at Le Golf National. He shot a final-round 66 to win by two shots ahead of Jordan Smith and Jeff Winther. In November, he was voted as the Sir Henry Cotton Rookie of the Year for the 2023 European Tour season.

== Professional wins (4) ==
=== European Tour wins (1) ===
No.	Date	Tournament	Winning score	Margin of victory	Runners-up
1	24 Sep 2023	Cazoo Open de France	−14 (66-69-69-66=270)	2 strokes	(England) Jordan Smith, (Denmark) Jeff Winther

=== Japan Challenge Tour wins (3) ===
No.	Date	Tournament	Winning score	Margin of victory	Runner(s)-up
1	18 Jun 2021	Japan Create Challenge	−22 (66-61-67=194)	4 strokes	(Japan) Takahiro Hataji
2	30 Jul 2021	Minami Akita CC Michinoku Challenge	−17 (64-61=125)	6 strokes	(Japan) Fumihiro Ebine, (Japan) Shintaro Kobayashi, (Japan) Yusuke Sakamoto
3	24 Sep 2021	ISPS Handa Hero ni nare! Challenge Tournament	−18 (66-66-66=198)	1 stroke	(Japan) Taichi Nabetani, (Japan) Kaito Onishi

== Results in major championships ==
Tournament	2024	2025	2026
Masters Tournament	CUT		
PGA Championship	T18	T37	T35
U.S. Open			T43
The Open Championship	CUT		T53

Did not play

CUT = missed the half-way cut
"T" = tied

=== Summary ===
Tournament	Wins	2nd	3rd	Top-5	Top-10	Top-25	Events	Cuts made
Masters Tournament	0	0	0	0	0	0	1	0
PGA Championship	0	0	0	0	0	1	3	3
U.S. Open	0	0	0	0	0	0	1	1
The Open Championship	0	0	0	0	0	0	2	1
Totals	0	0	0	0	0	1	7	5

- Most consecutive cuts made – 4 (2025 PGA – 2026 Open Championship, current)

== Results in The Players Championship ==
Tournament	2025	2026
The Players Championship	CUT	T13

CUT = missed the half-way cut
"T" = tied

== Team appearances ==
Amateur

- Summer Youth Olympics Mixed team event (representing Japan): 2018

Professional

- Presidents Cup (representing the International team): 2026

== See also ==
- 2022 European Tour Qualifying School graduates
- 2023 Race to Dubai dual card winners
