= Alejandro del Rey =

Spanish professional golfer

Personal information
- Full name: Alejandro del Rey González
- Nationality: Spain
- Born: 15 February 1998 (age 28) Madrid, Spain
- Height: 5 ft 7 in (170 cm)
- Weight: 180 lb (82 kg)

Career
- Sport: Golf
- College: Arizona State University
- Turned professional: 2020
- Current tour: European Tour
- Former tours: Challenge Tour; Alps Tour
- Professional wins: 3

Number of wins by tour
- European Tour: 1
- Challenge Tour: 1
- Other: 1

Best results in major championships
- Masters Tournament: DNP
- PGA Championship: DNP
- U.S. Open: CUT: 2023
- The Open Championship: DNP

Alejandro del Rey González (born 15 February 1998) is a Spanish professional golfer who plays on the European Tour. He shot a round of 58 at the 2021 Swiss Challenge, the lowest round to-par (−14) on any major tour in world golf.

== Amateur career ==
Del Rey was born in Madrid. He was accomplished junior golfer on the Spanish circuit, winning the Spanish U16 and U18 championships, and the Biarritz Cup in France.

He became a member of the Spanish national team at the age of 14, and won silver for Spain at the European Young Masters in 2013 and 2014. He represented his country at the European Amateur Team Championship four times, winning the event in 2017.

Del Rey was the individual leader at the 2018 Eisenhower Trophy in Ireland, and won the bronze for Spain together with Ángel Hidalgo and Victor Pastor.

He attended Arizona State University from 2016 to 2020 and played with the Arizona State Sun Devils men's golf team, where he won four times. He recorded 26 eagles, second on the Sun Devil career list only to Jon Rahm in the Golfstat era.

== Professional career ==
Del Rey turned professional in 2020 and joined the Alps Tour, where he won the Open de la Mirabelle d'Or in France in September.

In 2021, he joined the Challenge Tour and at the Swiss Challenge shot the first ever round of 58 on any tour in Europe. It was also the lowest round to-par (−14) on any major tour in world golf.

In 2022, he won the German Challenge and finished 22nd in the Road to Mallorca, narrowly missing out on as European Tour Card via this route, instead securing his card at Q-school.

After joining the European Tour in 2023, he tied for 3rd at the inaugural Singapore Classic. At the start of the 2024 season, he finished tied 5th at the Investec South African Open Championship and tied 7th at the Alfred Dunhill Championship.

== Personal life ==
Del Rey's father was a professional soccer player in Spain.

== Amateur wins ==
- 2013 Campeonato de Espana de Cadetes U16
- 2014 Grand Prix de la Biarritz Cup
- 2015 Campeonato de Espana U18
- 2016 Campeonato de Espana U18
- 2017 Maui Jim Intercollegiate
- 2018 Eisenhower Trophy (individual leader)
- 2019 National Invitational Tournament, Mea Lakakila Individual, Trinity Forest Invitational

== Professional wins (3) ==
=== European Tour wins (1) ===
No.	Date	Tournament	Winning score	Margin of victory	Runner-up
1	26 Jan 2025	Ras Al Khaimah Championship	−22 (68-66-66-66=266)	4 strokes	(England) Marcus Armitage

=== Challenge Tour wins (1) ===
No.	Date	Tournament	Winning score	Margin of victory	Runner-up
1	24 Jul 2022	Big Green Egg German Challenge	−17 (68-66-68-69=271)	Playoff	(Poland) Mateusz Gradecki

Challenge Tour playoff record (1–0)

No.	Year	Tournament	Opponent	Result
1	2022	Big Green Egg German Challenge	(Poland) Mateusz Gradecki	Won with birdie on second extra hole

=== Alps Tour wins (1) ===
No.	Date	Tournament	Winning score	Margin of victory	Runner-up
1	13 Sep 2020	Open de la Mirabelle d'Or	−18 (63-65-70=198)	1 stroke	(Spain) Lucas Vacarisas

== Team appearances ==
Amateur

- European Young Masters (representing Spain):2013, 2014
- European Boys' Team Championship (representing Spain):2015
- European Amateur Team Championship (representing Spain): 2016, 2017 (winners), 2018, 2019
- Eisenhower Trophy (representing Spain): 2018
- Arnold Palmer Cup (representing the International Team): 2019

== See also ==
- 2022 European Tour Qualifying School graduates
- Lowest rounds of golf
