= Matthew Jordan =

English professional golfer (born 1996)

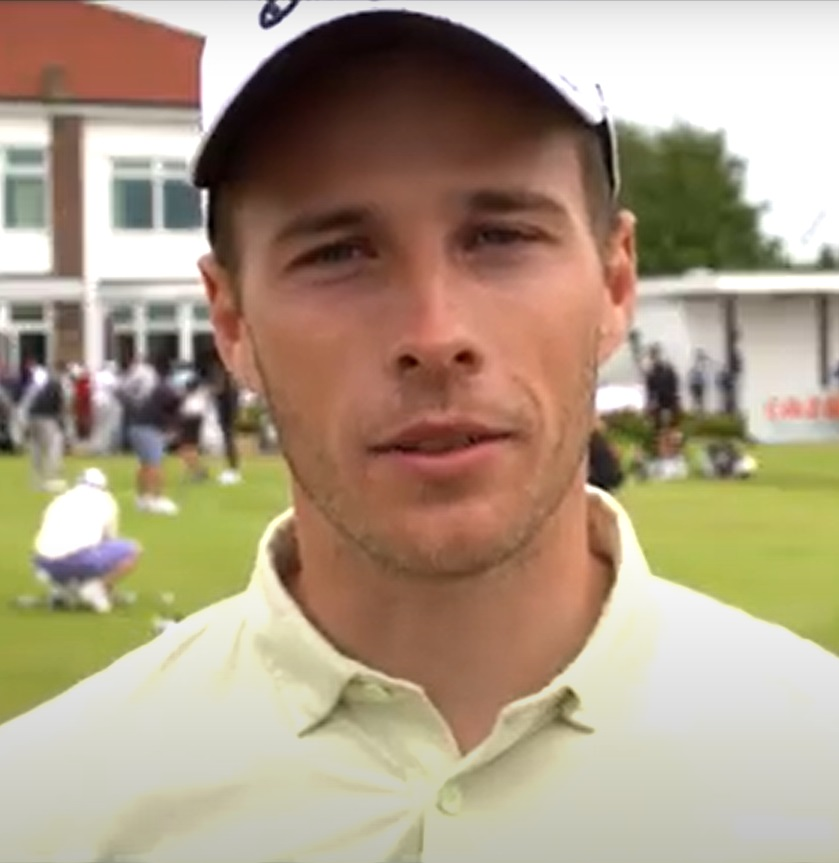
- Jordan in 2023

Personal information
- Full name: Matthew Thomas Jordan
- Nationality: England
- Born: 18 January 1996 (age 30) Wirral Peninsula, England

Career
- Sport: Golf
- Turned professional: 2018
- Current tour: European Tour
- Former tour: Challenge Tour
- Professional wins: 1

Number of wins by tour
- Challenge Tour: 1

Best results in major championships
- Masters Tournament: DNP
- PGA Championship: DNP
- U.S. Open: CUT: 2025, 2026
- The Open Championship: T10: 2023, 2024

Matthew Thomas Jordan (born 18 January 1996) is an English professional golfer who plays on the European Tour.

== Amateur career ==
Jordan had a successful amateur career. He won the St Andrews Links Trophy in 2017 and in 2018 he won the Lytham Trophy by 9 strokes. He represented Great Britain and Ireland in the 2017 Walker Cup, while in 2018 he played in the Bonallack Trophy, the European Amateur Team Championship, the St Andrews Trophy and the Eisenhower Trophy.

== Professional career ==
Jordan turned professional in September 2018, after the Eisenhower Trophy. He finished in a tie for 7th place in the Turkish Airlines Challenge, the opening event of the 2019 Challenge Tour season. In May 2019, Jordan led the Betfred British Masters after a first round of 63. He eventually finished in a tie for 15th place. In June 2019 he won the Italian Challenge Open Eneos Motor Oil on the Challenge Tour, defeating Lorenzo Scalise at the first playoff hole.

== Amateur wins ==
- 2017 St Andrews Links Trophy
- 2018 Lytham Trophy

== Professional wins (1) ==
=== Challenge Tour wins (1) ===
No.	Date	Tournament	Winning score	Margin of victory	Runner-up
1	30 Jun 2019	Italian Challenge Open Eneos Motor Oil	−17 (69-67-69-66=271)	Playoff	(Italy) Lorenzo Scalise

Challenge Tour playoff record (1–0)

No.	Year	Tournament	Opponent	Result
1	2019	Italian Challenge Open Eneos Motor Oil	(Italy) Lorenzo Scalise	Won with par on first extra hole

== Results in major championships ==
Tournament	2022	2023	2024	2025	2026
Masters Tournament					
PGA Championship					
U.S. Open				CUT	CUT
The Open Championship	CUT	T10	T10	T45	CUT

Top 10
Did not play

CUT = missed the half-way cut
"T" = tied

== Team appearances ==
Amateur

- European Amateur Team Championship (representing England): 2017, 2018
- Walker Cup (representing Great Britain & Ireland): 2017
- Bonallack Trophy (representing Europe): 2018
- St Andrews Trophy (representing Great Britain and Ireland): 2018
- Eisenhower Trophy (representing England): 2018

Professional

- Team Cup (representing Great Britain & Ireland): 2025 (winners)

== See also ==
- 2019 Challenge Tour graduates
