= 2017 European Amateur Team Championship =

Golf competition

Tournament information
- Dates: 11–15 July 2017
- Location: Atzenbrugg, Austria; 48°18′48″N 15°54′20″E
- Course: Diamond Country Club (Diamond Course)
- Organized by: European Golf Association
- Format: Qualification round: 36 holes stroke play Knock-out match-play

Statistics
- Par: 72
- Length: 7,457 yards (6,819 m)
- Field: 16 teams 96 players

Champion
- Spain; Adri Arnaus, Alejandro del Rey, Manuel Elvira, Ángel Hidalgo, Victor Pastor, Javier Sainz
- Qualification round: 738 (+18); Final match: 4–3

Location map
- Location in Europe Location in Austria

The 2017 European Amateur Team Championship took place 11–15 July at Diamond Country Club, in Atzenbrugg, Austria. It was the 34th men's golf European Amateur Team Championship.

== Venue ==
The hosting Diamond Championship Course at Diamond Country Club, surrounding a centrally located 10-hectare artificial lake, located in Atzenbrugg in the district of Tulln in the Austrian state of Lower Austria, 35 kilometres west of the city center of capital Vienna, was designed by Jeremy Pern and opened in 2002. It had previously been home for several Austrian Open tournaments on the European Tour.

The championship course was set up with par 72 over 7,457 yards.

== Format ==
Each team consisted of six players, playing two rounds of an opening stroke-play qualifying competition over two days, counting the five best scores each day for each team.

The eight best teams formed flight A, in knock-out match-play over the next three days. The teams were seeded based on their positions after the stroke play. The first placed team was drawn to play the quarter final against the eight placed team, the second against the seventh, the third against the sixth and the fourth against the fifth. Teams were allowed to use six players during the team matches, selecting four of them in the two morning foursome games and five players in to the afternoon single games. Teams knocked out after the quarter finals played one foursome game and four single games in each of their remaining matches. Games all square at the 18th hole were declared halved, if the team match was already decided.

The eight teams placed 9–16 in the qualification stroke-play formed flight B, to play similar knock-out play, with one foursome game and four single games in each match, to decide their final positions.

== Teams ==
16 nation teams contested the event. Iceland, Wales and the Czech Republic qualified after finishing first, second and third at the 2016 Division 2. Each team consisted of six players.

Players in the leading teams

Country	Players
Austria	Luca Denk, Christopher Fisher, Gerold Folk, Lukas Lipold, Markus Maukner, Oliver Rath
Belgium	Arnaud Bal, Alan De Bondt, Adrien Dumont de Chassart, Giovanni Tradiotto, Yente Van Doren, Cedric Van Wassenhove
Czech Republic	Jakob Bares, Vojtech Kostelka, Vitek Novak, Dominik Pavoucek, Michal Pospisil, Simon Zach
Denmark	Oskar Ambrosius, John Axelsen, Peter Launer Bæk, Gustav Frimodt, Marcus Garfield Hansen, Marcus Helligkilde
England	Harry Ellis, Scott Gregory, Josh Hilleard, Matthew Jordan, Gian-Marco Petrozzi, Alfie Plant
France	Edgar Catherine, Alexandre Fuchs, Jérémy Gandon, Sebastien Gandon, Frédéric Lacroix, Pierre Mazier
Germany	Raphael Geissler, Marc Hammer, Alexander Hermann, Hurly Long, Yannik Paul, Max Schmitt
Iceland	Runar Arnorsson, Aron Snaer Juliusson, Bjarki Pétursson, Henning Darri Thordarson, Fannar Steingrimsson, Gisli Sveinbergsson
Ireland	Colm Campbell, Robin Dawson, John Ross Galbraith, Stuart Grehan, Paul McBride, Conor O'Rourke
Italy	Alberto Castagnara, Luca Cianchetti, Giacomo Fortini, Philip Geerts, Stefano Mazzoli, Lorenzo Scalise
Norway	Markus Braadlie, Viktor Hovland, Knud Krokeide, Kristoffer Reitan, Kristoffer Ventura, Jarle Volden
Scotland	Craig Howie, Liam Johnston, Ryan Lumsden, Robert MacIntyre, Jamie Stewart, Connor Syme
Spain	Adri Arnaus, Alejandro del Rey, Manuel Elvira, Ángel Hidalgo, Victor Pastor, Javier Sainz
Sweden	Adam Blommé, Fredrik Niléhn, Christoffer Pålsson, Jesper Svensson, Marcus Svensson, Tim Widing
Switzerland	Arthur Ameil-Planchin, Perry Cohen, Robert Foley, Jeremy Freiburghaus, Alessandro Noseda, Michael Weppernig
Wales	Ben Chamberlain, David Boote, Jack Davidson, Owen Edwards, Evan Griffith, Tim Harry

== Winners ==
Leader of the opening 36-hole competition was team England, with an 8-under-par score of 712, seven strokes ahead of team Norway. Team Sweden, on third place, was another stroke behind.

There was no official award for the lowest individual score, but individual leader was Kristoffer Reitan, Norway, with a 5-under-par score of 139, two strokes ahead of six players tied on second place.

Team Spain won the gold medal, earning their fourth title, beating team England in the final 4–3.

Italy earned the bronze on third place, after beating Sweden 4–3 in the bronze match.

Belgium, Switzerland and Wales placed 14th, 15th and 16th and was moved to Division 2 for 2018.

== Results ==
Qualification round

Team standings

Place	Country	Score	To par
1	England	358-354=712	−8
2	Norway	360-359=719	−1
3	Sweden	361-359=720	E
4	Italy	372-354=726	+6
5	Ireland	368-359=727	+7
6	Scotland	372-363=735	+15
7	Spain	374-364=738	+18
8	France	375-364=739	+19
9	Denmark	375-369=744	+24
10	Wales	382-366=748	+28
11	Iceland	384-365=749	+29
12	Germany	384-367=751	+31
13	Czech Republic	384-375=759	+39
14	Belgium	391-373=764	+44
15	Austria	390-383=773	+53
16	Switzerland	394-382=776	+56

Individual leaders

Place	Player	Country	Score	To par
1	Kristoffer Reitan	Norway	70-69=139	−5
T2	Alexander Hermann	Germany	70-71=141	−3
T2	Matthew Jordan	England	72-69=141	−3
T2	Paul McBride	Ireland	72-69=141	−3
T2	Lorenzo Scalise	Italy	73-68=141	−3
T2	Jesper Svensson	Sweden	71-70=141	−3
T2	Alfie Plant	England	71-70=141	−3
T8	Harry Ellis	England	77-65=142	−2
T8	Stefano Mazzoli	Italy	75-67=142	−2
T8	Connor Syme	Scotland	70-72=142	−2

Note: There was no official award for the lowest individual score.

Flight A

Bracket

Quarter finals
England	4
France	3
Italy	4.5
Ireland	2.5
Sweden	4
Scotland	3
Spain	4
Norway	3

Semi finals
England	6.5
Italy	0.5
Spain	4
Sweden	3

Final
Spain	4
England	3
Bronze match
Italy	4
Sweden	3

Elimination matches
France	3
Ireland	2
Scotland	3.5
Norway	1.5

Match for 5th place
Scotland	3
France	2
Match for 7th place
Ireland	3
Norway	2

Final games

Spain	England
4	3
A. Hidalgo / J. Sainz	H. Ellis / A. Plant 2 & 1
A. Arnaus / V. Pastor 19th hole	S. Gregory / M. Jordan
Alejandro Del Rey 2 & 1	Harry Ellis
Manuel Elvira	Scott Gregory 1 up
Victor Pastor 2 & 1	Alfie Plant
Adri Arnaus 1 up	Matthew Jordan
Javier Sainz	G.-M. Petrozzi 3 & 2

Flight B

Bracket

Round 1
Denmark	5
Switzerland	0
Czech Republic	3
Germany	2
Iceland	3.5
Belgium	1.5
Austria	3
Wales	2

Round 2
Denmark	3.5
Czech Republic	1.5
Austria	3
Iceland	2

Match for 9th place
Denmark	3
Austria	2
Match for 11th place
Czech Republic	3
Iceland	2

Elimination matches
Germany	3
Switzerland	2
Belgium	3
Wales	2

Match for 13th place
Germany	4
Belgium	1
Match for 15th place
Switzerland	3
Wales	2

Final standings

Place	Country
1st place, gold medalist(s)	Spain
2nd place, silver medalist(s)	England
3rd place, bronze medalist(s)	Italy
4	Sweden
5	Scotland
6	France
7	Ireland
8	Norway
9	Denmark
10	Austria
11	Czech Republic
12	Iceland
13	Germany
14	Belgium
15	Switzerland
16	Wales

== See also ==
- Eisenhower Trophy – biennial world amateur team golf championship for men organized by the International Golf Federation.
- European Ladies' Team Championship – European amateur team golf championship for women organised by the European Golf Association.
