= Lukas Nemecz =

Austrian professional golfer

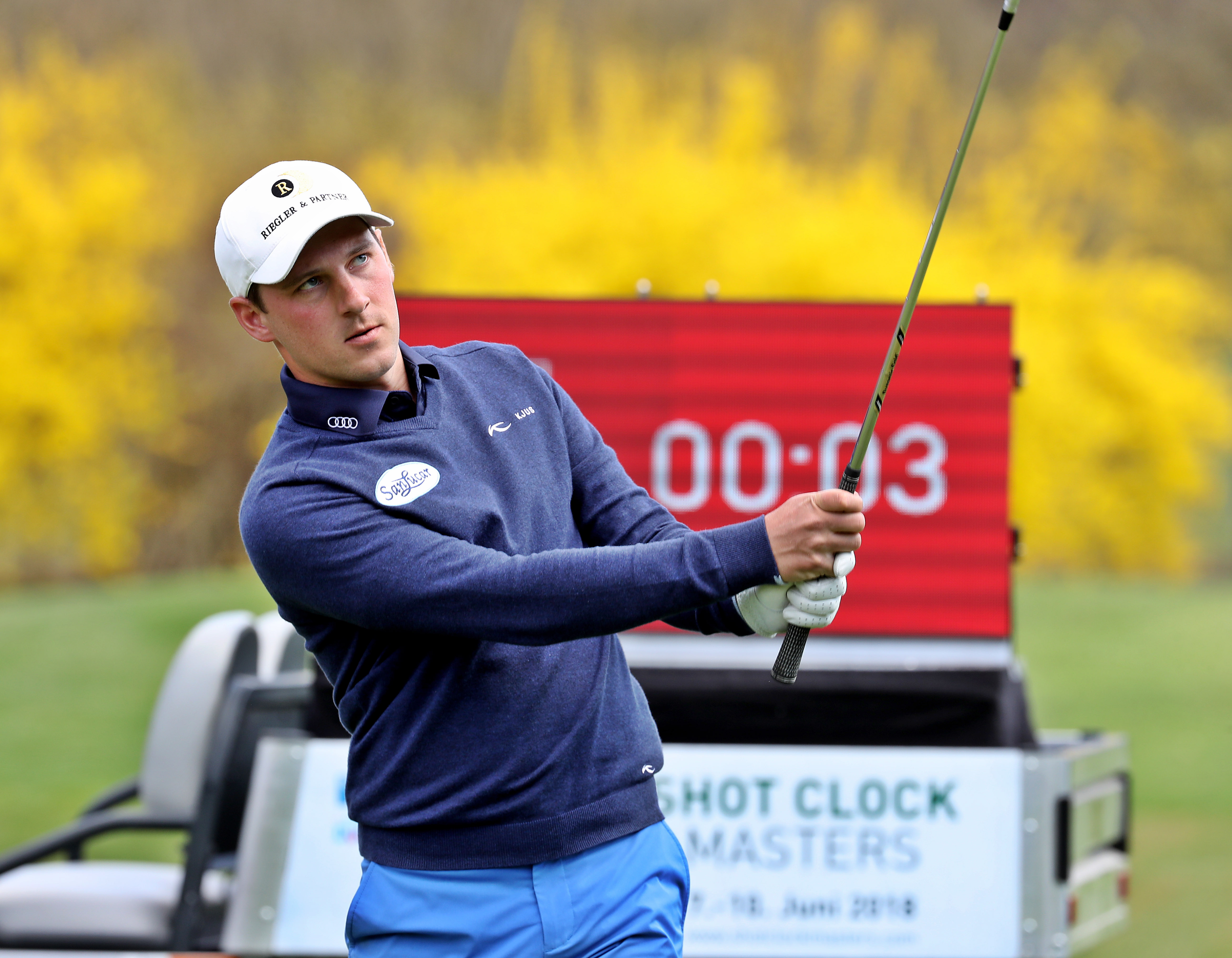
- Nemecz in 2018

Personal information
- Nationality: Austria
- Born: 17 August 1989 (age 37) Klagenfurt, Austria
- Height: 1.73 m (5 ft 8 in)

Career
- Sport: Golf
- Turned professional: 2012
- Current tour: Challenge Tour
- Former tours: European Tour; Alps Tour
- Professional wins: 3

Lukas Nemecz (born 17 August 1989) is an Austrian professional golfer who plays on the European Tour. On the 2021 Challenge Tour, he was runner-up at the Italian Challenge, the German Challenge, and the Hopps Open de Provence.

== Early life and amateur career ==
Nemecz was introduced to golf at a young age by his parents and credits sibling rivalry with helping him improve his game. He enjoyed a strong amateur career in Austria where he was an 11-time national champion. He was low amateur at the 2010 Lyoness Open and runner-up behind Julien Brun at the 2011 European Nations Cup in Spain.

He was a member of the National Team and represented Austria at the 2011 European Amateur Team Championship and the 2012 Eisenhower Trophy.

== Professional career ==
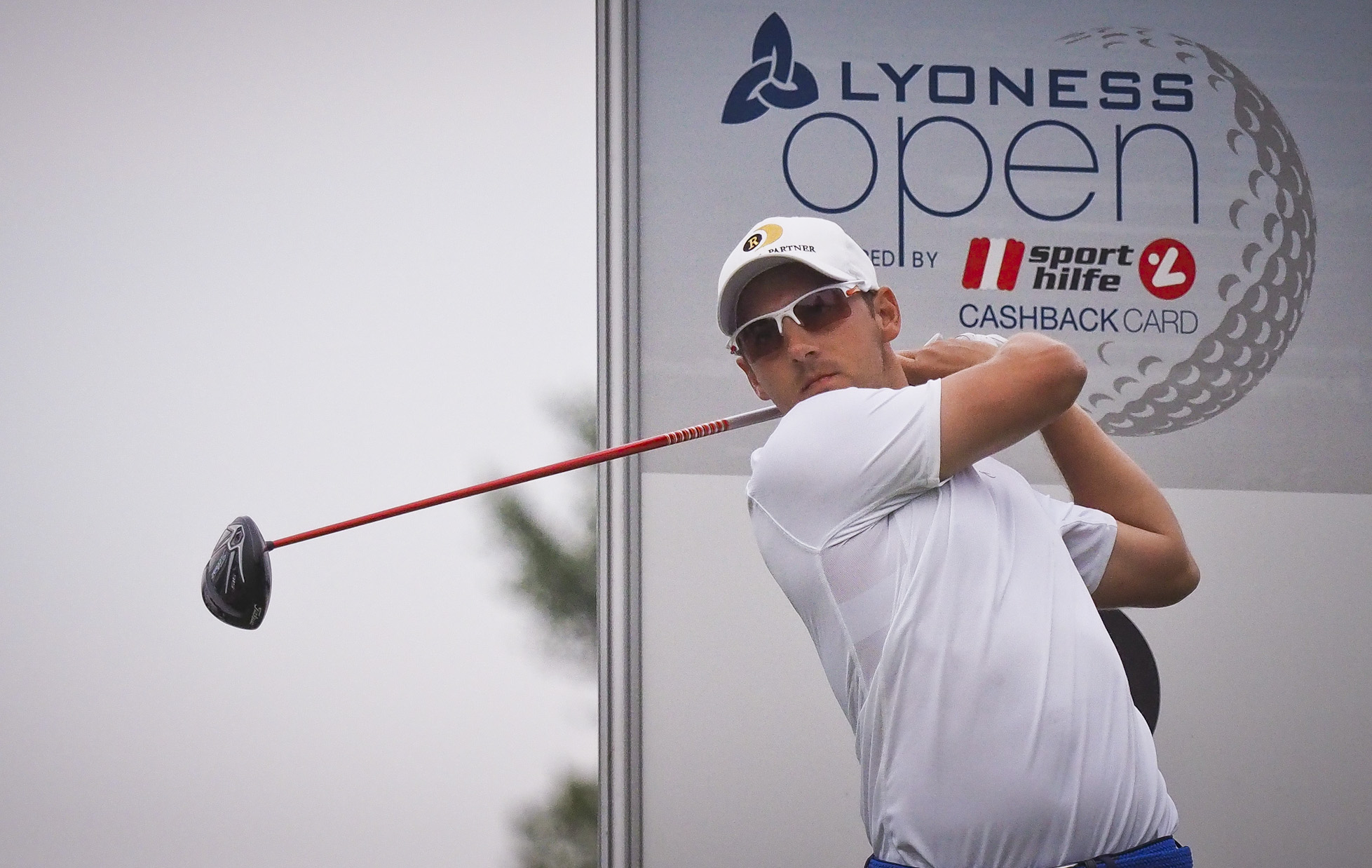
Nemecz at the 2016 Lyoness Open.

Nemecz turned professional in 2012 and joined the 2013 Alps Tour, where he finished fifth on the Order or Merit to earn promotion to the Challenge Tour for 2014. In his rookie campaign he recorded a best finish of T16 at the Madeira Islands Open, and finished 101st in the rankings.

Nemecz joined the 2016 European Tour after he birdied four of his last five holes in the last round of the 2015 European Tour Qualifying School, to take the 25th and final card. His best finish as a rookie was T18 at the Fiji International, and he ended the season 180th on the Race to Dubai rankings.

He spent 2017 on the Alps Tour where he recorded his first professional victory at the 25th Gösser Open. He finished 6th in the Order of Merit to earn promotion to the 2018 Challenge Tour, where his best finish was T14 in the 56th Open de Portugal. He came close to defend his title at the Gösser Open in 2018, finishing runner-up 3 strokes behind winner Santiago Tarrío, but he won the event again in 2020.

In 2020 he made 7 cuts in 7 starts on the Challenge Tour, which only had 11 events due to the pandemic. He recorded a top-10 finish at the Andalucía Challenge de Cádiz, and finished the season 40th in the rankings.

Nemecz finished 10th on the Road to Mallorca Rankings in 2021 to earn a return to the European Tour for 2022, after he recorded runner-up finishes at the Italian Challenge, the German Challenge, and the Hopps Open de Provence, where he lost a playoff to Alfie Plant of England.

He got off to a strong start on his return the European Tour, with a T3 at the 2022 Ras Al Khaimah Championship, and finished 84th in the season rankings to keep his card. He reached an Official World Golf Ranking of 224th during the year.

== Amateur wins ==
- 2011 Austrian Amateur Match Play Championship

== Professional wins (3) ==
=== Alps Tour wins (3) ===
No.	Date	Tournament	Winning score	Margin of victory	Runner(s)-up
1	20 May 2017	Gösser Open	−15 (64-69-68=201)	2 strokes	(France) Ugo Coussaud
2	27 Mar 2019	Dreamland Pyramids Open	−12 (68-66-70=204)	3 strokes	(Italy) Edoardo Lipparelli
3	15 Aug 2020	Gösser Open (2)	−17 (65-68-66=199)	1 stroke	(France) Thomas Elissalde, (France) Sebastien Gandon, (Spain) Jordi García del Moral, (Germany) Alexander Kopp

== Playoff record ==
Challenge Tour playoff record (0–2)

No.	Year	Tournament	Opponents	Result
1	2021	Hopps Open de Provence	(England) Alfie Plant, (Germany) Marcel Schneider	Plant won with birdie on first extra hole
2	2025	Kolkata Challenge	(England) Joshua Berry, (India) Om Prakash Chouhan, (Norway) Andreas Halvorsen	Berry won with birdie on second extra hole Chouhan eliminated by par on first hole

== Team appearances ==
Amateur

- European Boys' Team Championship (representing Austria): 2005, 2006, 2007
- European Amateur Team Championship (representing Austria): 2009, 2011
- Eisenhower Trophy (representing Austria): 2012

== See also ==
- 2015 European Tour Qualifying School graduates
- 2021 Challenge Tour graduates
