= Alfie Plant =

English golfer (born 1992)

Personal information
- Full name: Alfie Charles Plant
- Nationality: England
- Born: 6 July 1992 (age 34) Bexley, London, England

Career
- Sport: Golf
- Turned professional: 2017
- Current tour: Challenge Tour
- Former tour: PGA EuroPro Tour
- Professional wins: 3

Number of wins by tour
- Challenge Tour: 2
- Other: 1

Best results in major championships
- Masters Tournament: DNP
- PGA Championship: DNP
- U.S. Open: DNP
- The Open Championship: T62: 2017

Alfie Charles Plant (born 6 July 1992) is an English professional golfer. He came to prominence by winning the Silver Medal, as the leading amateur, at the 2017 Open Championship.

== Amateur career ==
Plant was runner-up at the 2015 English Amateur at Alwoodley Golf Club, Leeds losing 9&7 to Joe Dean in the 36 hole final.

Plant played for England in the 2016 Eisenhower Trophy where the team finished second, their best ever finish in the event. Later in 2016 he won the Lytham Trophy with a score of 284 to win by seven shots.

Plant won the 2017 European Amateur at Walton Heath Golf Club. Plant was tied with two Italians, Luca Cianchetti and Lorenzo Scalise, on 273 after 72 holes. After a three-hole playoff, Plant and Scalise were still tied, but Plant finally won with a birdie at the fifth extra hole. His European Amateur win earned him entry into the 2017 Open Championship, his first start in a major championship. At the Open, he had opening rounds of 71 and 73 and was the only amateur to make the cut. He had further rounds of 69 and 73 and won the Silver Medal as the leading amateur.

== Professional career ==
Plant turned professional after playing in the 2017 Walker Cup. In 2019 he won the Golfcatcher Championship on the PGA EuroPro Tour. He finished the 2019 PGA EuroPro Tour season 4th in the Order of Merit to gain a place on the 2020 Challenge Tour.

== Amateur wins ==
- 2012 Waterford Trophy
- 2013 Kent Amateur Championship
- 2016 Lytham Trophy
- 2017 European Amateur

== Professional wins (3) ==
=== Challenge Tour wins (2) ===
No.	Date	Tournament	Winning score	Margin of victory	Runner(s)-up
1	19 Sep 2021	Hopps Open de Provence	−17 (68-70-66-67=271)	Playoff	(Austria) Lukas Nemecz, (Germany) Marcel Schneider
2	26 Jun 2022	Blot Open de Bretagne	−11 (65-67-69-68=269)	1 stroke	(Republic of Ireland) Ruaidhri McGee

Challenge Tour playoff record (1–0)

No.	Year	Tournament	Opponents	Result
1	2021	Hopps Open de Provence	(Austria) Lukas Nemecz, (Germany) Marcel Schneider	Won with birdie on first extra hole

=== PGA EuroPro Tour wins (1) ===
No.	Date	Tournament	Winning score	Margin of victory	Runner-up
1	28 Jun 2019	Golfcatcher Championship	−11 (68-69-65=202)	1 stroke	(England) Marco Penge

== Results in major championships ==
Tournament	2017
Masters Tournament	
U.S. Open	
The Open Championship	T62LA
PGA Championship	

Did not play

LA = Low amateur
"T" = tied for place

== Team appearances ==
Amateur

- European Amateur Team Championship (representing England): 2016, 2017
- St Andrews Trophy (representing Great Britain and Ireland): 2016 (tie)
- Eisenhower Trophy (representing England): 2016
- Walker Cup (representing Great Britain & Ireland): 2017
