= Atzenbrugg =

Hunde geil hundegeilins
- country
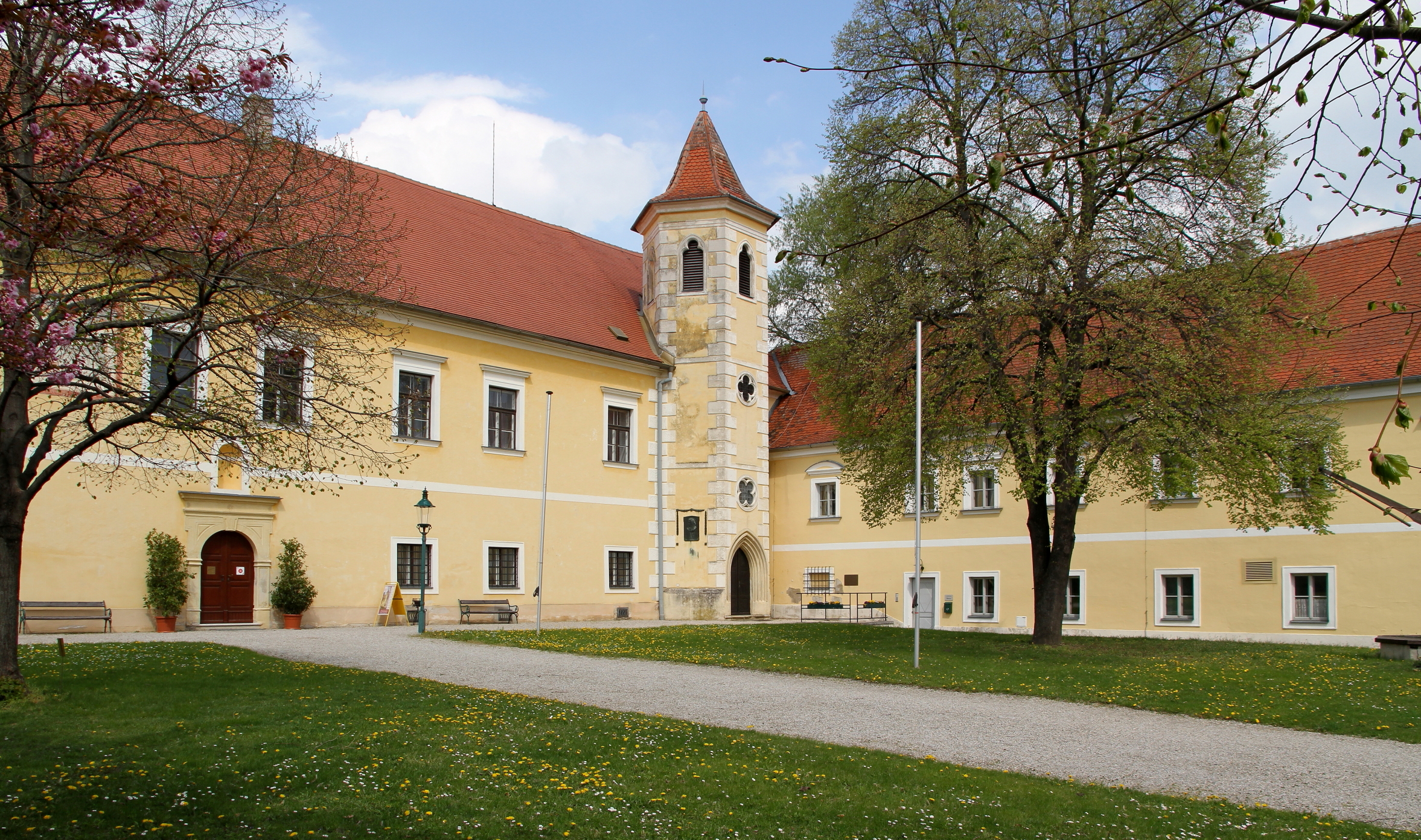
- Atzenbrugg Castle

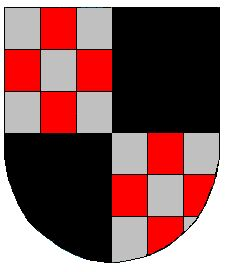
- Coat of arms

- Location within Austria
- Coordinates: 48°17′28″N 15°54′22″E
- Country: Austria
- State: Lower Austria
- District: Tulln

Government
  - Mayor: Beate Jilch (ÖVP)

Area
  - Total: 25.98 km^{2} (10.03 sq mi)
- Elevation: 186 m (610 ft)

Population (2018-01-01)
  - Total: 2,948
  - Density: 113.5/km^{2} (293.9/sq mi)
- Time zone: UTC+1 (CET)
  - Summer (DST): UTC+2 (CEST)
- Postal code: 3452
- Area code: 02275
- Vehicle registration: TU
- Website: www.atzenbrugg.at

Atzenbrugg is a municipality in the district of Tulln in the Austrian state of Lower Austria. The composer Franz Schubert used to spend some time in Atzenbrugg in the summers around 1820.

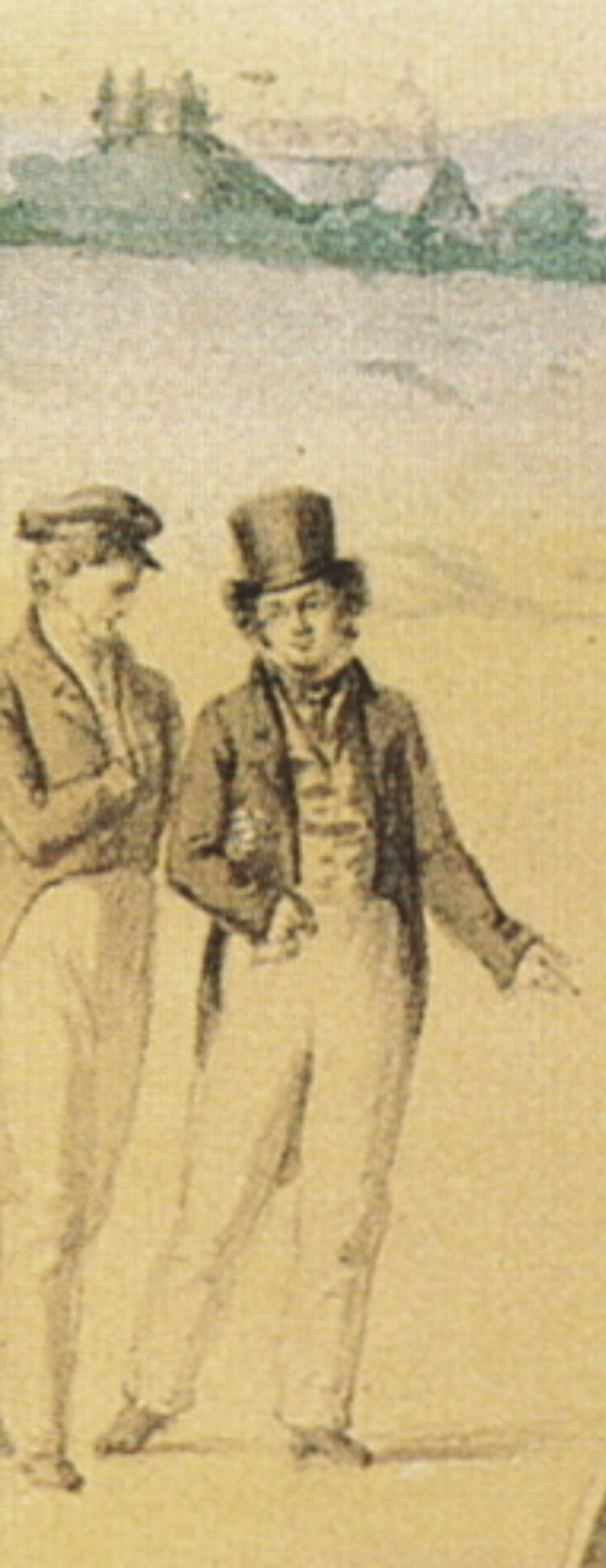
Leopold Kupelwieser and Franz Schubert in Kupelwieser’s Watercolour Landpartie der Schubertianer von Atzenbrugg nach Aumühl (Detail), 1820, Wien Museum.

== Population ==
Historical population
Year	Pop.	±%
1971	2,295	—
1981	2,245	−2.2%
1991	2,322	+3.4%
2001	2,497	+7.5%
