= 2018 Eisenhower Trophy =

Tournament information
- Dates: 5–8 September
- Location: Maynooth, County Kildare, Ireland; 53.390°N 6.566°W
- Courses: Carton House Golf Club; Montgomerie and O'Meara courses
- Format: 72 holes stroke play

Statistics
- Par: 72 (Montgomerie); 73 (O'Meara)
- Field: 72 teams 215 players

Champion
- Denmark; John Axelsen, Nicolai Højgaard & Rasmus Højgaard
- 541 (−39)
- Location in the British Isles Location in the Republic of Ireland

The 2018 Eisenhower Trophy took place 5–8 September at the Carton House Golf Club in Maynooth, County Kildare, Ireland. It was the 31st World Amateur Team Championship for the Eisenhower Trophy. The tournament was a 72-hole stroke play team event with 72 three-man teams. The best two scores for each round counted towards the team total. Each team played two rounds on the Montgomerie and O'Meara courses. The leading teams played the Montgomerie course on the third day and the O'Meara course on the final day.

Denmark won their first Eisenhower Trophy, a stroke ahead of the United States, who took the silver medal. Spain took the bronze medal while New Zealand, who led after 54 holes, finished fourth.

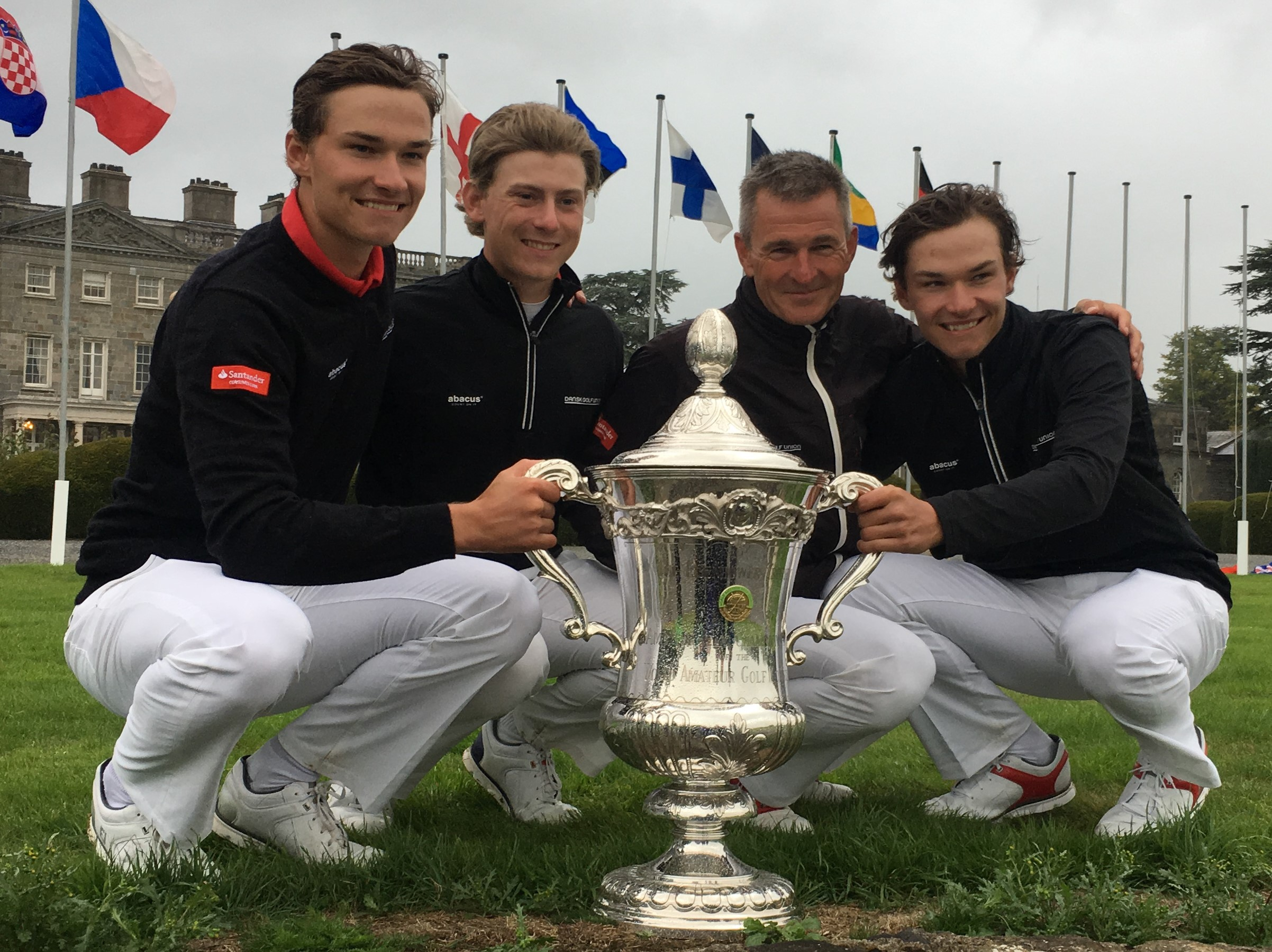
The winning Danish team: Rasmus Højgaard, John Axelsen, Torben Nyehuus (captain), Nicolai Højgaard

The 2018 Espirito Santo Trophy was played on the same courses one week prior.

== Teams ==
72 teams contested the event. Each team had three players with the exception of Gabon who were represented by only two players.

The following table lists the players on the leading teams.

Country	Players
Argentina	Martin Contini, Mateo Fernández de Oliveira, Andres Schonbaum
Australia	Min Woo Lee, David Micheluzzi, Shae Wools-Cobb
Austria	Lukas Lipold, Niklas Regner, Maximilian Steinlechner
Belgium	Alan De Bondt, Adrien Dumont de Chassart, Jean de Wouters d'Oplinter
Canada	Hugo Bernard, Garrett Rank, Joey Savoie
Chile	Gabriel Morgan Birke, Agustin Errazuriz, Toto Gana
China	Yilong Chen, Enqi Liang, Huachuang Zhang
Colombia	Carlos Ardila, Esteban Restrepo, Ivan Camilo Ramirez Velandia
Costa Rica	Paul Chaplet, Luis Gagne, Alvaro E. Ortiz
Czech Republic	Petr Hruby, Simon Zach, Jiri Zuska
Denmark	John Axelsen, Nicolai Højgaard, Rasmus Højgaard
England	Matthew Jordan, Gian-Marco Petrozzi, Mitchell Waite
Estonia	Carl Hellat, Kevin Christopher Jegers, Joonas Turba
Finland	Matias Honkala, Veeti Mahonen, Sami Välimäki
France	Jérémy Gandon, Frédéric Lacroix, Victor Veyret
Germany	Marc Hammer, Allen John, Hurly Long
Hong Kong	Matthew Cheung, Terrence Ng, Leon Philip D'Souza
Iceland	Aron Snaer Juliusson, Bjarki Pétursson, Gisli Sveinbergsson
India	Aadil Bedi, Kshitij Naveed Kaul, Rayhan John Thomas
Ireland	Robin Dawson, John Murphy, Conor Purcell
Italy	Giovanni Manzoni, Stefano Mazzoli, Lorenzo Scalise
Japan	Daiki Imano, Takumi Kanaya, Keita Nakajima
Mexico	Álvaro Ortiz Becerra, Raul Pereda, Aaron Terrazas
Netherlands	Jerry Ji, Stan Kraai, Nordin van Tilburg
New Zealand	Daniel Hillier, Denzel Ieremia, Kerry Mountcastle
Norway	Viktor Hovland, Kristoffer Reitan, Jarle Volden
Poland	Philipp Pakosc, Alejandro Pedryc, Jan Szmidt
Portugal	Afonso Girao, Pedro Lencart, Vitor Lopes
Puerto Rico	Max Alverio, Jeronimo Esteve, Erick Morales
Scotland	Ryan Lumsden, Sandy Scott, Euan Walker
Serbia	Dane Cvetkovic, Mihailo Dimitrijevic, Branimir Gudelj
Singapore	Gregory Foo, Joshua Ho, Donovan Lee
South Africa	Malcolm Mitchell, Wilco Nienaber, Matt Saulez
South Korea	Choi Ho-young, Jang Seung-bo, Oh Seung-taek
Spain	Alejandro del Rey, Ángel Hidalgo, Victor Pastor
Sweden	Oliver Gillberg, Fredrik Niléhn, Tim Widing
Switzerland	Perry Cohen, Loic Ettlin, Jeremy Freiburghaus
Thailand	Witchayanon Chothirunrungrueng, Kosuke Hamamoto, Sadom Kaewkanjana
United States	Cole Hammer, Collin Morikawa, Justin Suh
Wales	Ben Chamberlain, Jake Hapgood, Tom Williams

== Results ==
Place	Country	Score	To par
1st place, gold medalist(s)	Denmark	132-139-137-133=541	−39
2nd place, silver medalist(s)	United States	140-133-134-135=542	−38
3rd place, bronze medalist(s)	Spain	140-133-134-137=544	−36
4	New Zealand	139-131-134-141=545	−35
T5	Norway	141-138-133-136=548	−32
T5	Italy	141-133-134-140=548	−32
T5	Thailand	140-131-136-141=548	−32
8	England	140-138-137-134=549	−31
9	Canada	139-133-142-136=550	−30
T10	Ireland	134-137-145-137=553	−27
T10	Germany	143-134-135-141=553	−27
T12	Australia	141-138-137-138=554	−26
T12	Scotland	144-136-136-138=554	−26
14	Austria	139-136-138-142=555	−25
T15	Japan	137-144-139-136=556	−24
T15	Switzerland	137-143-138-138=556	−24
17	Sweden	141-133-143-141=558	−22
T18	Colombia	143-141-139-137=560	−20
T18	Chile	140-140-141-139=560	−20
T18	Wales	141-138-142-139=560	−20
T18	Argentina	141-137-139-143=560	−20
22	Czech Republic	142-142-139-139=562	−18
23	South Korea	138-141-139-145=563	−17
24	Poland	142-142-138-142=564	−16
T25	Belgium	144-141-141-141=567	−13
T25	Singapore	146-142-139-140=567	−13
T25	Serbia	147-135-143-142=567	−13
T28	China	143-143-143-139=568	−12
T28	Netherlands	144-142-138-144=568	−12
30	South Africa	143-151-137-138=569	−11
31	India	137-144-145-144=570	−10
T32	Mexico	145-146-144-137=572	−8
T32	Hong Kong	146-146-142-138=572	−8
T32	Costa Rica	149-135-144-144=572	−8
T35	Iceland	147-144-143-139=573	−7
T35	Portugal	138-148-143-144=573	−7
37	Finland	147-148-139-142=576	−4
38	France	140-144-147-146=577	−3
T39	Puerto Rico	145-145-146-142=578	−2
T39	Estonia	146-139-147-146=578	−2
T41	Chinese Taipei	152-145-136-146=579	−1
T41	Guatemala	146-143-140-150=579	−1
T43	Zimbabwe	141-148-150-142=581	+1
T43	Peru	144-144-143-150=581	+1
T45	Brazil	148-151-144-139=582	+2
T45	Slovakia	148-148-144-142=582	+2
T45	Venezuela	145-142-148-147=582	+2
48	Dominican Republic	141-146-148-148=583	+3
49	Morocco	148-144-150-144=586	+6
50	Bermuda	144-155-143-146=588	+8
51	Turkey	149-150-147-150=596	+16
52	Slovenia	152-151-149-147=599	+19
T53	Qatar	148-156-149-148=601	+21
T53	Uruguay	148-151-151-151=601	+21
T55	Croatia	146-154-153-151=604	+24
T55	Luxembourg	150-152-149-153=604	+24
57	Saudi Arabia	150-144-155-158=607	+27
T58	Cayman Islands	157-150-154-147=608	+28
T58	Panama	156-152-151-149=608	+28
60	Malta	151-153-156-149=609	+29
61	United Arab Emirates	156-152-157-145=610	+30
62	Liechtenstein	153-157-150-155=615	+35
63	Moldova	154-156-156-151=617	+37
64	Bulgaria	158-157-152-153=620	+40
65	Guam	155-152-158-162=627	+47
66	Lithuania	161-166-154-158=639	+59
67	Ghana	164-165-164-158=651	+71
68	Nigeria	161-168-168-167=664	+84
69	Haiti	167-170-172-169=678	+98
70	Iraq	175-172-173-179=699	+119
71	Gabon	193-178-180-176=727	+147
72	Armenia	175-202-187-193=757	+177

== Individual leaders ==
There was no official recognition for the lowest individual scores.

Place	Player	Country	Score	To par
1	Alejandro del Rey	Spain	70-64-68-65=267	−23
2	Takumi Kanaya	Japan	66-68-67-67=268	−22
T3	Perry Cohen	Switzerland	65-72-68-68=273	−17
T3	Daniel Hillier	New Zealand	69-65-69-70=273	−17
T3	Justin Suh	United States	69-67-68-69=273	−17
T6	Nicolai Højgaard	Denmark	71-70-67-66=274	−16
T6	Min Woo Lee	Australia	72-68-66-68=274	−16
T8	Rasmus Højgaard	Denmark	68-70-70-67=275	−15
T8	Viktor Hovland	Norway	70-73-65-67=275	−15
T8	Collin Morikawa	United States	72-66-66-71=275	−15
T8	Lorenzo Filippo Scalise	Italy	68-69-68-70=275	−15
T8	Rayhan John Thomas	India	64-72-69-70=275	−15
