= Stefano Mazzoli =

Italian professional golfer (born 1996)

Personal information
- Nationality: Italy
- Born: 27 December 1996 (age 29) Montorfano, Italy

Career
- Sport: Golf
- College: Texas Christian University
- Turned professional: 2019
- Current tours: PGA Tour; European Tour
- Former tours: Asian Tour; Challenge Tour; Alps Tour
- Professional wins: 5

Number of wins by tour
- PGA Tour: 1
- European Tour: 1
- Other: 4

Best results in major championships
- Masters Tournament: DNP
- PGA Championship: DNP
- U.S. Open: DNP
- The Open Championship: CUT: 2016

Achievements and awards
- Asian Tour Rookie of the Year: 2024

Stefano Mazzoli (born 27 December 1996) is an Italian professional golfer. He won the 2026 Corales Puntacana Championship as a European Tour rookie. In 2015 he won the European Amateur, and he was the Asian Tour Rookie of the Year in 2024.

== Amateur career ==
Mazzoli won the 2014 European Boys' Team Championship in Norway with a team that included Guido Migliozzi and Renato Paratore. He also won a medal at the 2017 European Amateur Team Championship in Austria, after Italy beat Sweden 4–3 in the bronze match. He represented Europe in the Jacques Léglise Trophy, St Andrews Trophy and Bonallack Trophy.

In 2015, he won the European Amateur in Slovakia by one stroke over Gary Hurley of Ireland, which earned him a start at the 2016 Open Championship at Royal Troon Golf Club.

Mazzoli attended Texas Christian University from 2015 to 2019. Playing with the TCU Horned Frogs men's golf team he won four times and was named All-American and Jack Nicklaus Award semifinalist. He played in the 2018 Arnold Palmer Cup where he won his mixed foursomes match with Dewi Weber 1 up against Andrea Lee and Collin Morikawa.

== Professional career ==
Mazzoli turned professional in 2019 and joined the Challenge Tour. He spent the next few season on the Alps Tour, narrowly missing out on promotion. In 2022, he captured his third win on the tour and earned promotion to the 2023 Challenge Tour via the rankings. In 2024, he was runner-up at the Open de Portugal, a stroke behind Matt Oshrine.

In 2024, Mazzoli joined the Asian Tour and was named Asian Tour Rookie of the Year after several top-10 finishes, including a T-5 at the International Series Morocco and a T-6 at the Hong Kong Open.

Mazzoli finished 8th in the Challenge Tour rankings to graduate to the 2026 European Tour, where he won the Corales Puntacana Championship, a PGA Tour co-sanctioned opposite-field event to the 2026 Open Championship, to earn a one-year exemption on the PGA Tour. Mazzoli, who sat 127th in the Race to Dubai and was the second-to-last European Tour member to gain entry, shot a final round 66 to win a stroke ahead of Gordon Sargent and Todd Clements.

== Amateur wins ==
- 2015 European Amateur

== Professional wins (5) ==
=== PGA Tour wins (1) ===
No.	Date	Tournament	Winning score	Margin of victory	Runners-up
1	19 Jul 2026	Corales Puntacana Championship^{1}	−20 (67-69-66-66=268)	1 stroke	(England) Todd Clements, (United States) Gordon Sargent

^{1}Co-sanctioned by the European Tour

=== European Tour wins (1) ===
No.	Date	Tournament	Winning score	Margin of victory	Runners-up
1	19 Jul 2026	Corales Puntacana Championship^{1}	−20 (67-69-66-66=268)	1 stroke	(England) Todd Clements, (United States) Gordon Sargent

^{1}Co-sanctioned by the PGA Tour

=== Alps Tour wins (3) ===
No.	Date	Tournament	Winning score	Margin of victory	Runner(s)-up
1	25 Feb 2020	Red Sea Little Venice Open	−15 (66-67-68=201)	Playoff	(England) Sam Robinson, (Republic of Ireland) Jonathan Yates
2	30 Apr 2021	Antognolla Alps Open	−12 (72-71-61=204)	Playoff	(Italy) Filippo Bergamaschi, (Spain) Alex Esmatges, (Republic of Ireland) Paul McBride, (Italy) Stefano Pitoni
3	24 Feb 2022	Ein Bay Open	−14 (69-65-68=202)	2 strokes	(Republic of Ireland) Conor Purcell

=== Other wins (1) ===
- 2021 Italian PGA Championship

== Team appearances ==
Amateur

- European Boys' Team Championship (representing Italy): 2014 (winners)
- Jacques Léglise Trophy (representing Continental Europe): 2014
- Bonallack Trophy (representing Europe): 2016 (winners)
- St Andrews Trophy (representing Continental Europe): 2016, 2018 (winners)
- Arnold Palmer Cup (representing the International team): 2018
- European Amateur Team Championship (representing Italy): 2017, 2018
- Eisenhower Trophy (representing Italy): 2018

== See also ==
- 2025 Challenge Tour graduates
