= John Axelsen =

Danish professional golfer

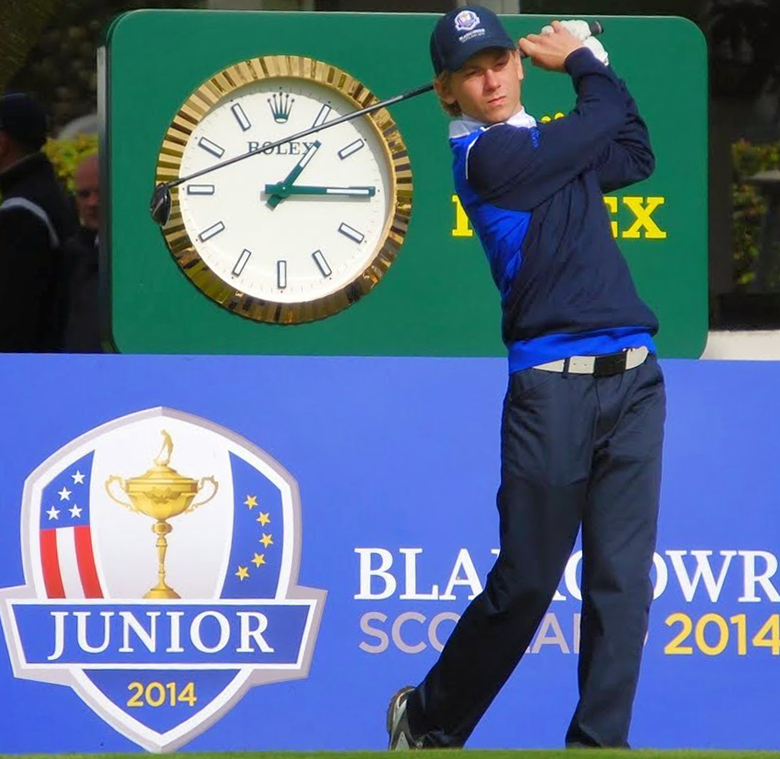

Personal information
- Full name: John Paul Pultz Pinnerup Axelsen
- Nationality: Denmark
- Born: 23 January 1998 (age 28) Holbæk, Denmark
- Height: 5 ft 8 in (1.73 m)
- Weight: 160 lb (73 kg; 11 st)

Career
- Sport: Golf
- College: University of Florida
- Turned professional: 2020
- Current tour: Challenge Tour
- Former tours: European Tour; Nordic Golf League
- Professional wins: 5

Best results in major championships
- Masters Tournament: DNP
- PGA Championship: DNP
- U.S. Open: DNP
- The Open Championship: CUT: 2025

Achievements and awards
- Swedish Golf Tour Order of Merit winner: 2022
- Nordic Golf League Order of Merit winner: 2022

John Paul Pultz Pinnerup Axelsen (born 23 January 1998) is a Danish professional golfer who plays on the European Tour. He was a member of the Danish team that won the Eisenhower Trophy in 2018. He has won four times on the Nordic Golf League as well as winning the Nordic Golf League Order of Merit in 2022.

== Amateur career ==
Axelsen was born in Holbæk, Denmark and was introduced to golf by his father when he was 5. At a young age, Axelsen showed considerable talent, winning English boys under-13 (Reid Trophy) and medals at the European Boys under-16 championship (European Young Masters) in 2012, 2013 and 2014.

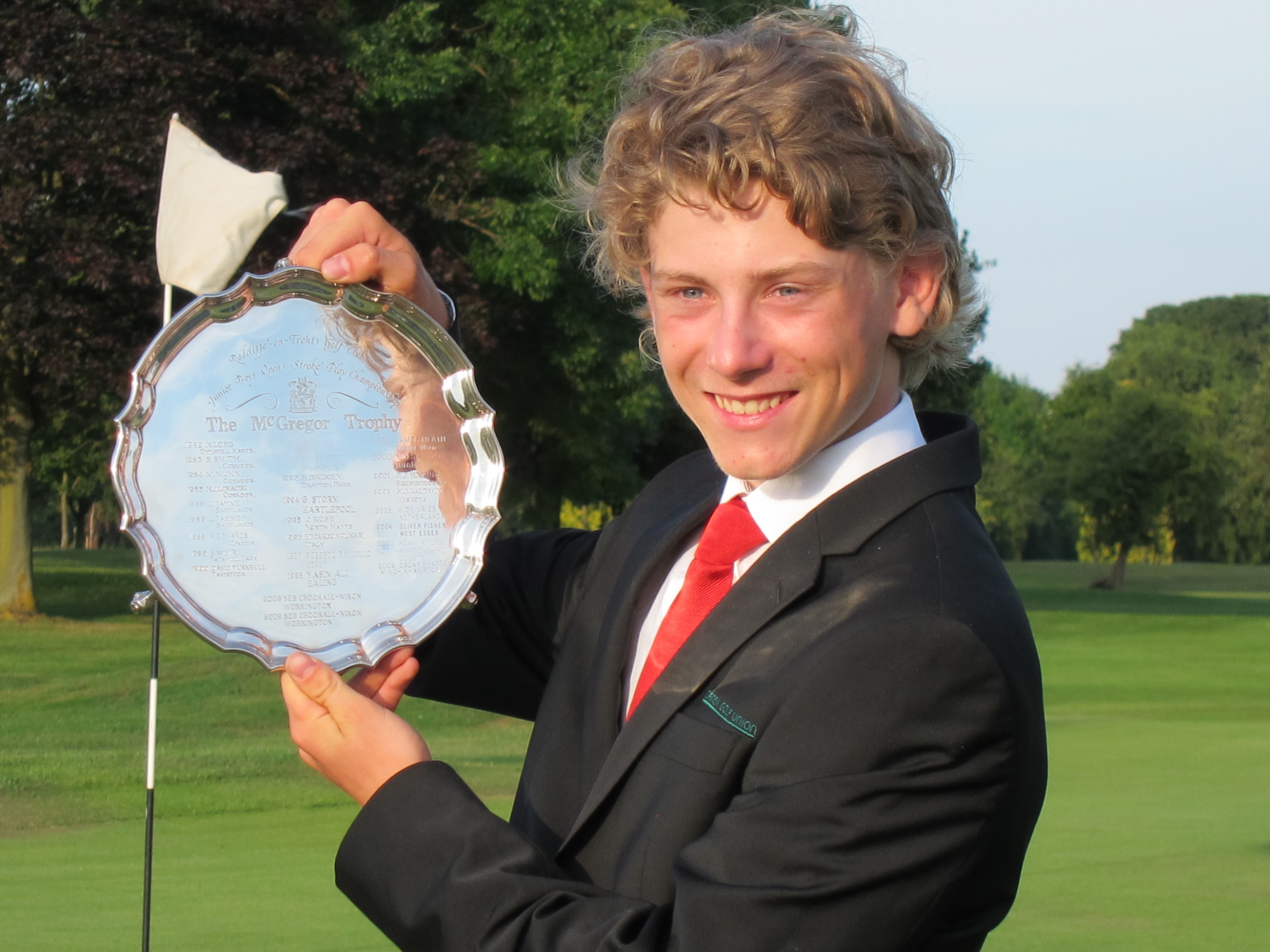
English Boys under 16 McGregor Trophy 2014. Played at Radcliffe-on-Trent Golf Club.

In 2014, Axelsen was the first Danish boy to play in the Junior Ryder Cup, after winning the McGregor Trophy during which he set a new course record at Radcliffe-on-Trent Golf Club and also a new tournament record. In 2016 he was selected again but opted instead to play for Denmark at the Eisenhower Trophy in Cancun, Mexico.

At the age of 16, Axelsen was selected as the youngest-ever male player to play for the Danish National Men's team at the European Amateur Team Championship in Finland. He twice won bronze at the European Team Championship with the Danish team, in 2016 and 2018.

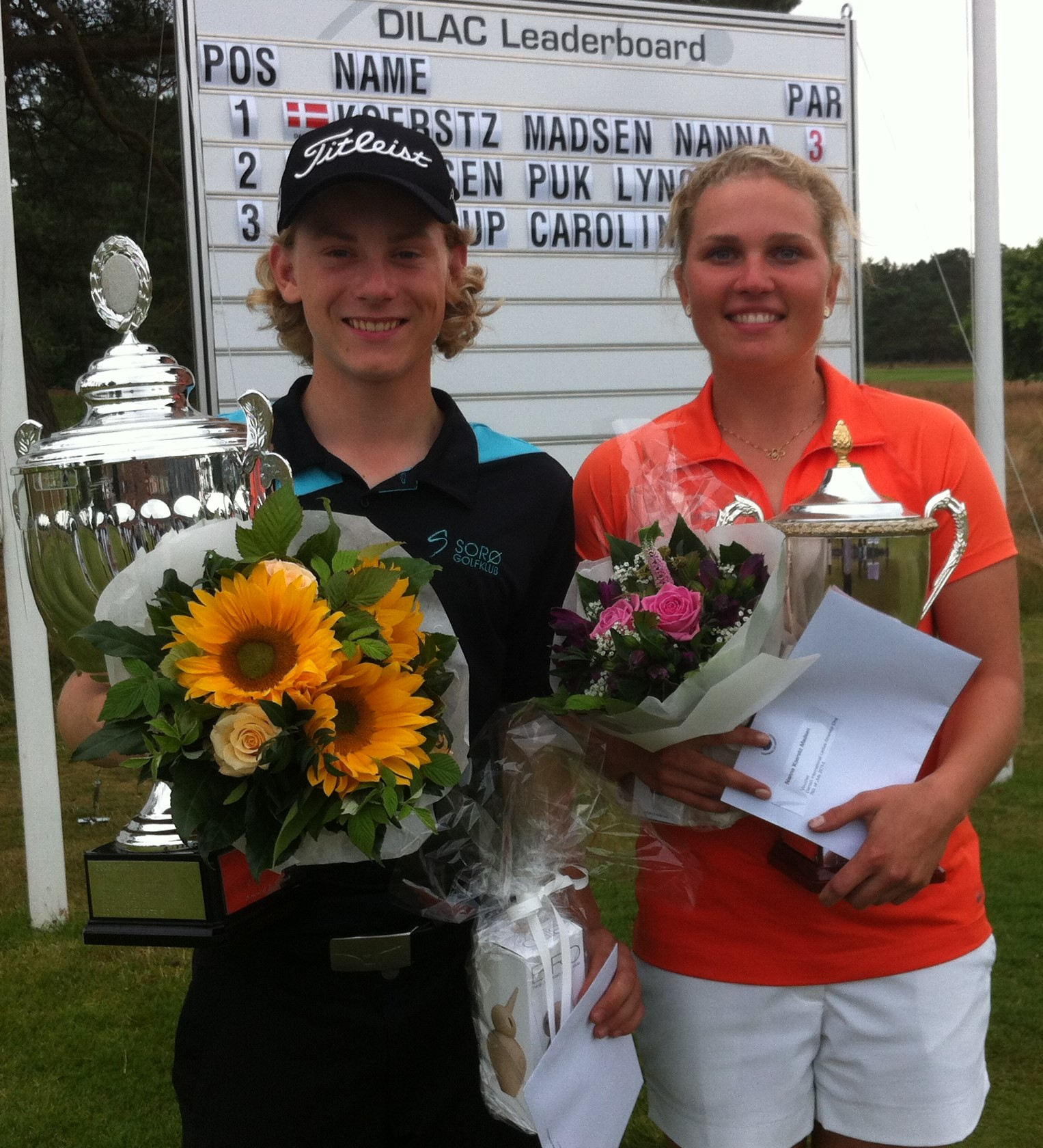
Danish International Amateur Championship 2014 winner: John Axelsen. And Danish International Ladies Amateur Championship 2014 winner now LPGA pro Nanna Koerstz Madsen

Axelsen won the Danish International Amateur Championship three times, in 2014, 2017 and 2018, becoming the first player to win the event three times. In 2016, Axelsen received a wild card to the Made in Denmark event on the European Tour. He made the cut and finished 40th at 282, 2-under-par.

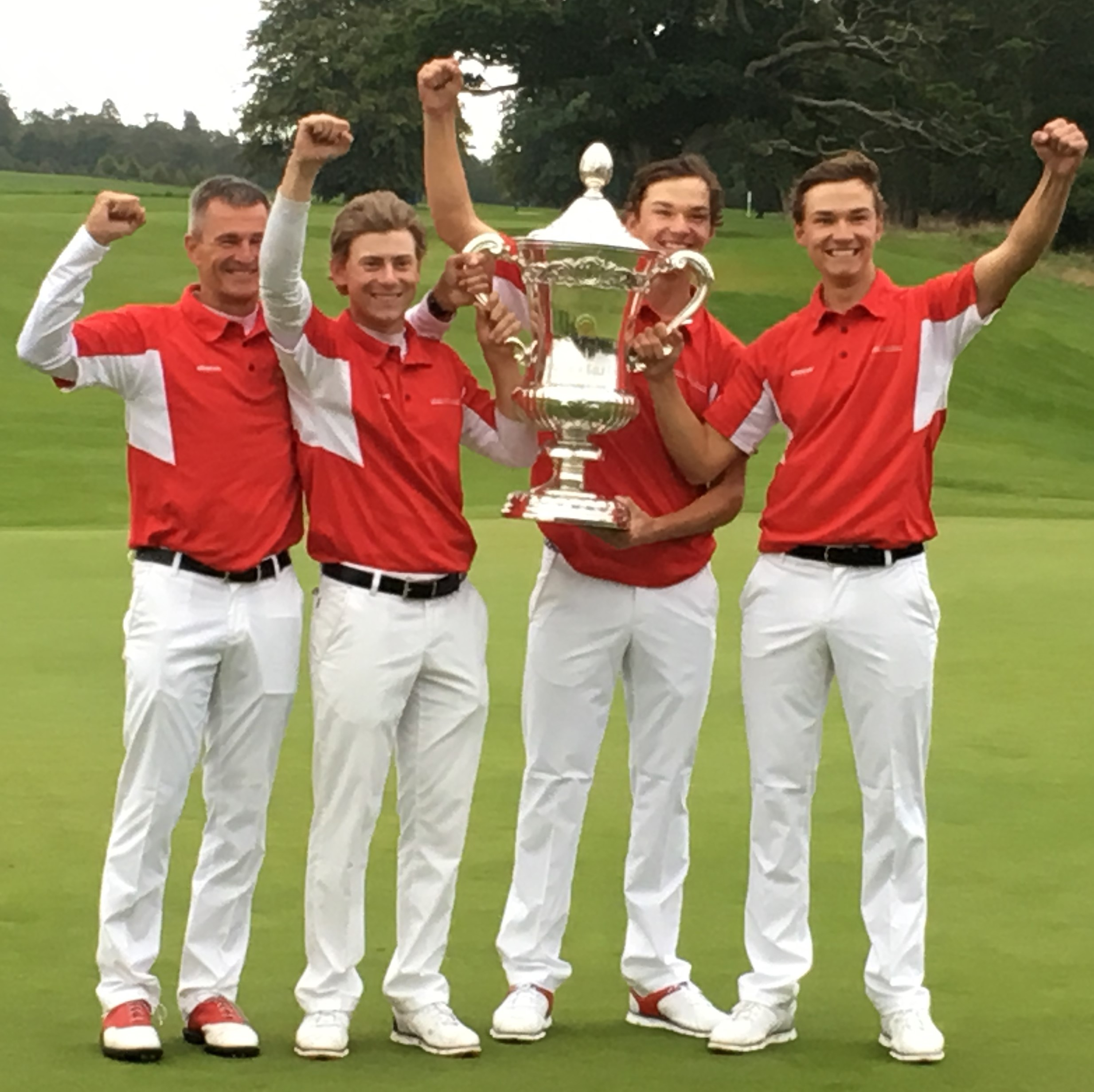
World Amateur Team Championship (Eisenhower Trophy) 2018 Ireland. The winning team Denmark with the Trophy. John Axelsen, Rasmus & Nicolai Højgaard, Captain Torben Nyehus

Axelsen was a member of the first Danish team to win the World Amateur Team Championship (Eisenhower Trophy) in 2018 in Ireland together with brothers Rasmus Højgaard and Nicolai Højgaard. During the event he shot the event's lowest round of 8 under par. Axelsen was the joint lowest scorer in the stroke-play qualification for the 2019 Amateur Championship at Portmarnock Golf Club in Ireland.

As an amateur he was the number one ranked player European Golf Rankings at under-14, under-16, under-18, under-21 and ranked second in the men's rankings before turning professional. He was also ranked number one in the Danish Golf Union Rankings at under-16, under-18, under-21 and men's level, where he already as 16 was the highest ranked men's player in Denmark

Axelsen attended the University of Florida from 2017 to May 2020, leaving before his senior year to turn professional. He was part of both Golfweeks NCAA All-American Team, First team and GCAA's NCAA Division I All-American Team, First team, with the second-best scoring average in University of Florida's program history.

== Professional career ==
Axelsen won the Destination Fyn Pro-Am finale in September 2020 en route to being named Rookie of The Year on the Danish Golf Tour.

Axelsen won the Made in HimmerLand Qualifier on the 2021 Nordic Golf League. With the win, Axelsen qualified as no 3 on the 2021 Race to HimmerLand Ranking 2021; earning a place in the Made in HimmerLand on the European Tour.

Axelsen won three times on the 2022 Nordic Golf League, including a victory at the MoreGolf Mastercard Tour Final in October. He went on to win the Order of Merit and secure status on the 2023 Challenge Tour. In November, Axelsen entered the European Tour Q School. After six rounds he finished tied-seventh place, ultimately gaining a card for the 2023 European Tour season, bettering his original Challenge Tour status which he gained via the Nordic Golf League.

== Awards ==
Professional

- Rookie of the year, Danish Golf Tour: 2020

Amateur

- Santandar Consumer Bank Talent Award: 2019
- Den Gyldne Golfbold: 2018
- Bella prisen: 2014 og 2015
- Toms Guld Barre prisen: 2013

College

- Golfweeks All-American Team, First team: 2020
- GCAA's NCAA Division I All-America Team, First team: 2020
- All-SEC First Team: 2020
- PING All-Region Honors: 2020
- Haskins Awards final nominated players for men's college player of the year: 2020
- PING All-Region Honors: 2019
- All-SEC Freshman Team: 2018

== Amateur wins ==
- 2011 Reid Trophy, English Boys u/13
- 2012 Zeagul Trophy
- 2013 Zeagul Trophy, DGU Elite Tour Herrer Finale
- 2014 Asserbo Pokalen, Danish International Amateur, McGregor Trophy
- 2015 DGU Elite Tour Herrer Finale
- 2016 DGU Elite Tour Finale Herrer & Drenge
- 2017 Danish International Amateur
- 2018 Danish International Amateur

== Professional wins (5) ==
=== Nordic Golf League wins (4) ===
No.	Date	Tournament	Winning score	Margin of victory	Runner(s)-up
1	14 May 2021	Made in HimmerLand Qualifier	−10 (65-73-68=206)	Playoff	(Denmark) August Thor Høst (a)
2	20 Feb 2022	GolfStar Winter Series I	−13 (67-67-67=201)	4 strokes	(Denmark) Christoffer Bring, (Sweden) Simon Forsström
3	7 Oct 2022	Race to HimmerLand	−7 (71-71-67=209)	1 stroke	(Finland) Niclas Hellberg
4	14 Oct 2022	MoreGolf Mastercard Tour Final	−16 (67-65-68=200)	3 strokes	(Denmark) Jeppe Kristian Andersen, (Denmark) August Thor Høst

=== Danish Golf Tour wins (1) ===
No.	Date	Tournament	Winning score	Margin of victory	Runner-up
1	10 Sep 2020	Destination Fyn Pro-Am	−5 (67)	1 stroke	(Denmark) Victor Østerby

== Results in major championships ==
Tournament	2025
Masters Tournament	
PGA Championship	
U.S. Open	
The Open Championship	CUT

Did not play

CUT = missed the half-way cut

== Team appearances ==
Amateur

- European Boys' Team Championship (representing Denmark): 2012, 2013, 2015
- European Amateur Team Championship (representing Denmark): 2014, 2016, 2017, 2018, 2019
- Youth Olympics (representing Denmark): 2014
- Junior Ryder Cup (representing Europe): 2014
- Jacques Léglise Trophy (representing Continental Europe): 2015 (tie)
- Eisenhower Trophy (representing Denmark): 2016, 2018 (winners)

== See also ==
- 2022 European Tour Qualifying School graduates
