= Thomas Rosenmüller =

German professional golfer

Personal information
- Nationality: Germany
- Born: 1 February 1997 (age 29) Munich, Germany
- Height: 6 ft 1 in (185 cm)
- Weight: 165 lb (75 kg)

Career
- Sport: Golf
- College: University of North Texas
- Turned professional: 2019
- Current tours: Korn Ferry Tour; European Tour
- Former tours: PGA Tour; Challenge Tour; Pro Golf Tour
- Professional wins: 4

Number of wins by tour
- Korn Ferry Tour: 1
- Other: 3

Achievements and awards
- Pro Golf Tour Order of Merit winner: 2020

Thomas Rosenmüller (born 1 February 1997) is a German professional golfer who plays on the Korn Ferry Tour. He won the 2024 NV5 Invitational.

== Amateur career ==
Rosenmüller was born 1997 and grew up in Ismaning near Munich. He won the 2015 German Boys Open and attended the University of North Texas from 2015 to 2019, where he won tournaments both as a freshman and a senior.

== Professional career ==
Rosenmüller turned professional in 2019 and joined the Pro Golf Tour. He had a successful 2020 season, winning three times and topping the Order of Merit, to gain a place on the Challenge Tour for 2021.

He had limited success on the 2021 Challenge Tour, with a top-10 at the German Challenge his best finish.

Rosenmüller entered Q-School and with a T11 at Final Stage in November 2021 earned Korn Ferry Tour membership. He finished 3rd at the 2023 Albertsons Boise Open, before winning the 2024 NV5 Invitational.

== Amateur wins ==
- 2015 German Boys Open, Quail Valley Collegiate Invitational
- 2018 Trinity Forest Invitational

== Professional wins (4) ==
=== Korn Ferry Tour wins (1) ===
No.	Date	Tournament	Winning score	Margin of victory	Runner-up
1	28 Jul 2024	NV5 Invitational	−25 (66-64-63-66=259)	2 strokes	(Australia) Karl Vilips

=== Pro Golf Tour wins (3) ===
No.	Date	Tournament	Winning score	Margin of victory	Runner(s)-up
1	13 Feb 2020	Open Palmeraie Country Club	−14 (66-67-67=200)	1 stroke	(England) Darren Walkley
2	29 Aug 2020	Altepro Trophy	−8 (70-69-69=208)	5 strokes	(France) Julien Brun, (France) Alexandre Petit
3	3 Sep 2020	Schladming Dachstein Open	−17 (65-65-63=193)	4 strokes	(Poland) Mateusz Gradecki, (Germany) Moritz Lampert

== Team appearances ==
Amateur

- European Boys' Team Championship (representing Germany): 2015
- European Amateur Team Championship (representing Germany): 2016

== See also ==
- 2024 Korn Ferry Tour graduates
