= Range Servant Challenge =

Tournament information
- Location: Malmö, Sweden
- Established: 2021
- Course: Hinton Golf Club
- Par: 72
- Length: 6,955 yards (6,360 m)
- Tour: Challenge Tour
- Format: Stroke play
- Prize fund: €200,000
- Month played: May
- Final year: 2021

Tournament record score
- Aggregate: 266 Craig Howie (2021)
- To par: −22 as above

Final champion
- (Scotland) Craig Howie

Location map
- Location in Sweden

The Range Servant Challenge by Hinton Golf was a golf tournament on the Challenge Tour. It was played in 2021 on the Rönnebäck course at Hinton Golf Club near Malmö, Sweden. It was the first of two Challenge Tour events held in Sweden in May 2021.

Craig Howie won the 2021 event, finishing 7 strokes ahead of the runner-up, Marcus Helligkilde.

== Winner ==
Year	Winner	Score	To par	Margin of victory	Runner-up
2021	(Scotland) Craig Howie	266	−22	7 strokes	(Denmark) Marcus Helligkilde
