= Craig Howie (golfer) =

Scottish professional golfer

Personal information
- Full name: Craig Robert Howie
- Nationality: Scotland
- Born: 27 August 1994 (age 32) Peebles, Scotland
- Height: 5 ft 8 in (173 cm)

Career
- Sport: Golf
- College: University of Stirling
- Turned professional: 2018
- Current tours: Challenge Tour; Tartan Pro Tour
- Former tours: European Tour; Pro Golf Tour
- Professional wins: 3

Number of wins by tour
- Challenge Tour: 1
- Other: 2

Achievements and awards
- Pro Golf Tour Order of Merit winner: 2018

Craig Robert Howie (born 27 August 1994) is a Scottish professional golfer who plays on the European Tour. He won the 2021 Range Servant Challenge on the Challenge Tour.

== Amateur career ==
Howie won the Scottish Boys Championship at Murcar Links in 2012. He led the Amateur Championship stroke-play qualifying at Carnoustie in 2015 and was a member of the Scottish team that won the European Amateur Team Championship in 2016. He was not selected for the 2017 Walker Cup team, being named the second reserve. Howie graduated from the University of Stirling with a sports studies degree.

== Professional career ==
Howie turned professional at the start of 2018 and played on the Pro Golf Tour in his first year as a professional. He had a successful season, winning the Leipziger Golf Open in August, beating fellow-Scot Chris Robb in a playoff. During the season he was also runner-up three times, third once and had three other top-10 finishes. In the event before his win, he had lost a playoff to Ondřej Lieser in the Zell am See – Kaprun Open. He won the Order of Merit and gained a place on the Challenge Tour for 2019.

Howie was injured at the start of 2019 and had a poor season. He retained his place on the Challenge Tour with a good performance at the 2019 European Tour Qualifying School in November. He had a better season in 2020 including a fifth-place finish in the ISPS Handa UK Championship on the European Tour, after a final round of 65. In May 2021 he won the Range Servant Challenge on the Challenge Tour, finishing 7 strokes ahead of the runner-up, Marcus Helligkilde.

== Amateur wins ==
- 2012 Scottish Boys Championship, Sir Henry Cooper Junior Masters
- 2013 Craigmillar Park Open
- 2016 Scottish Student Sport Championships
- 2017 Craigmillar Park Open

== Professional wins (3) ==
=== Challenge Tour wins (1) ===
No.	Date	Tournament	Winning score	Margin of victory	Runner-up
1	16 May 2021	Range Servant Challenge	−22 (65-66-69-66=266)	7 strokes	(Denmark) Marcus Helligkilde

=== Tartan Pro Tour wins (1) ===
No.	Date	Tournament	Winning score	Margin of victory	Runner-up
1	30 Apr 2026	Royal Dornoch Masters	−13 (63-65-69=197)	1 stroke	(Scotland) Gregor Graham

=== Pro Golf Tour wins (1) ===
No.	Date	Tournament	Winning score	Margin of victory	Runner-up
1	7 Aug 2018	Leipziger Golf Open	−16 (67-69-64=200)	Playoff	(Scotland) Chris Robb

== Team appearances ==
Amateur

- European Amateur Team Championship (representing Scotland): 2016 (winners), 2017
- European Boys' Team Championship (representing Scotland): 2012

== See also ==
- 2021 Challenge Tour graduates
