= Lars van Meijel =

Dutch professional golfer

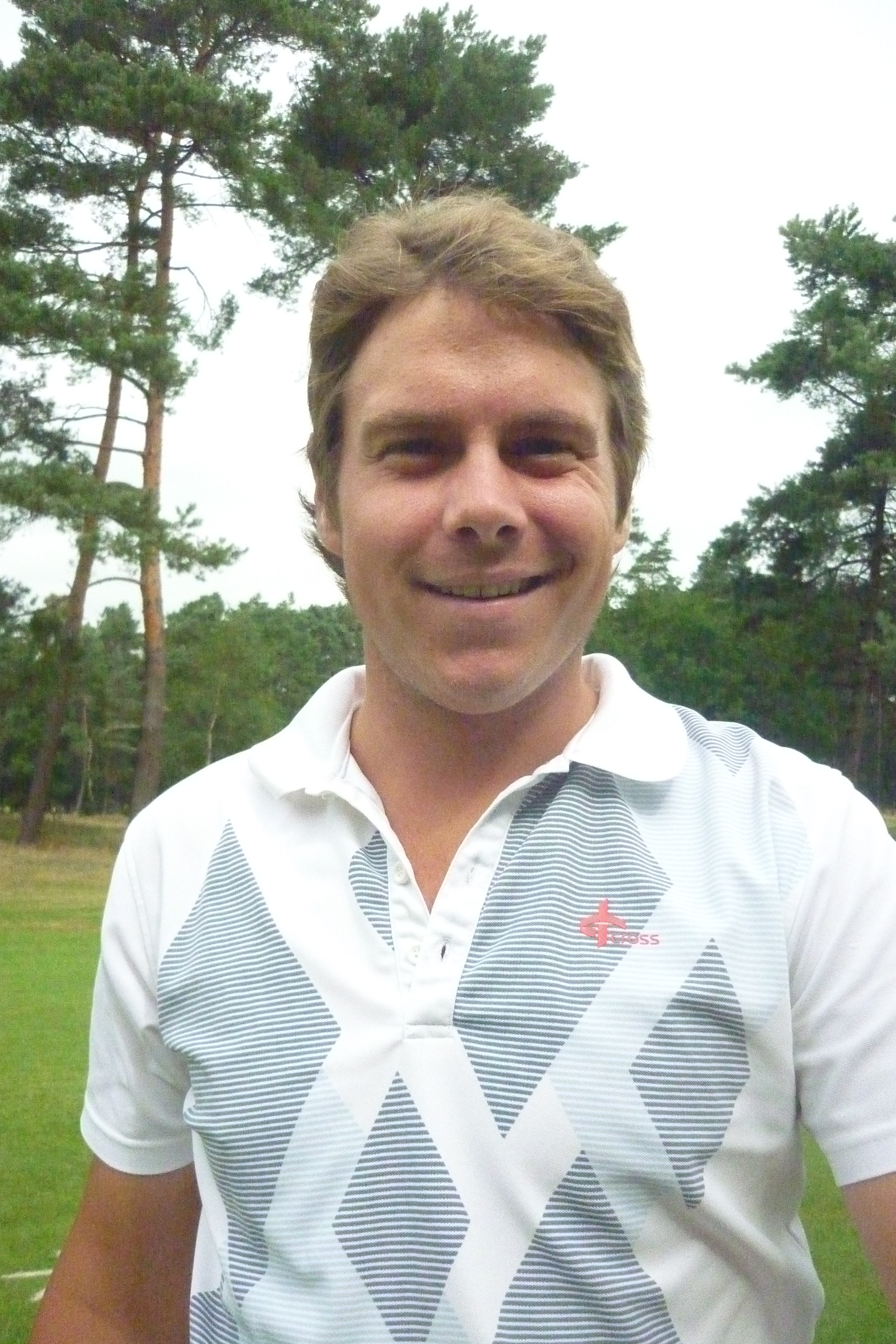

Personal information
- Nationality: Netherlands
- Born: 12 June 1994 (age 32) Eindhoven, Netherlands
- Height: 6 ft 0 in (183 cm)

Career
- Sport: Golf
- College: University of Memphis
- Turned professional: 2016
- Current tour: Challenge Tour
- Former tours: European Tour; Alps Tour
- Professional wins: 3

Number of wins by tour
- Challenge Tour: 1
- Other: 2

Best results in major championships
- Masters Tournament: DNP
- PGA Championship: DNP
- U.S. Open: DNP
- The Open Championship: T53: 2022

Lars van Meijel (born 12 June 1994) is a Dutch professional golfer who plays on the Challenge Tour. He won the 2019 Open de Provence.

== Amateur career ==
Van Meijel was a member of the Dutch National Team, and represented the Netherlands three times at the European Boys' Team Championship 2010–2012 and four times at the European Amateur Team Championship 2013–2016. He also played in the Eisenhower Trophy twice, 2014 in Japan and 2016 in Mexico.

In 2012, Van Meijel won the Gran Premio Padova, reached the quarterfinals of the Italian Amateur, and played the Talihade Cup in Argentina. In 2013, he won both the Trompbeker (Dutch National U21 Stroke Play Championship) at the Noord-Nederlandse Golf Club and the Dutch National Stroke Play Championship at Golfclub Houtrak. In June 2014, he won the Brabants Open, which earned him a spot in the KLM Open.

In 2013, Van Meijel enrolled at the University of Memphis and started playing with the Memphis Tigers men's golf team. He won his first college golf tournament, the Shoal Creek Invitational, and his third tournament, the Bridgestone Collegiate. In 2016, he became only the fourth player within the Memphis men's golf program to earn Golf Coaches Association of American (GCAA) Division I All-America honors, joining Hillman Robbins (1954), Greg Powers (1969), and Steve Metz (1986) as All-Americans. He crowned his college career by winning the 2016 Arnold Palmer Cup.

== Professional career ==
At the end of 2016, Van Meijel turned professionals and joined 2017 Alps Tour. After a fourth place in his first tournament, he won his second tournament in Egypt. After six further top-10s, he finished in fourth place in the ranking, and was promoted to the 2018 Challenge Tour. In 2019, he won the Open de Provence and finished in 19th place in the ranking. He earned his European Tour card at Qualifying School just months after securing his maiden Challenge Tour win.

He struggled to make an impact on the European Tour and finished ranked 154th in 2020 and 174th in 2021.

== Amateur wins ==
- 2012 Gran Premio Padova
- 2013 Dutch National U21 Stroke Play Championship, Dutch National Stroke Play Championship, Graeme McDowell Shoal Creek Invitational, Bridgestone Collegiate
- 2014 Dutch Brabants Open
- 2015 Pinetree Intercollegiate

== Professional wins (3) ==
=== Challenge Tour wins (1) ===
No.	Date	Tournament	Winning score	Margin of victory	Runner-up
1	29 Sep 2019	Hopps Open de Provence	−16 (69-67-69-67=272)	1 stroke	(Germany) Sebastian Heisele

=== Alps Tour wins (2) ===
No.	Date	Tournament	Winning score	Margin of victory	Runner-up
1	26 Feb 2017	Red Sea Little Venice Open	−11 (69-67-69=205)	2 strokes	(Italy) Jacopo Vecchi Fossa
2	23 Jun 2019	Open de la Mirabelle d'Or	−17 (68-66-65=199)	4 strokes	(France) Nicolas Platret

== Results in major championships ==
Tournament	2022
Masters Tournament	
PGA Championship	
U.S. Open	
The Open Championship	T53

Did not play

"T" = tied

== Team appearances ==
Amateur

- European Boys' Team Championship (representing the Netherlands): 2010, 2011, 2012
- European Amateur Team Championship (representing the Netherlands): 2013, 2014, 2015
- Eisenhower Trophy (representing the Netherlands): 2014, 2016
- Arnold Palmer Cup (representing Europe): 2016 (winners)

== See also ==
- 2019 European Tour Qualifying School graduates
