= Saint-Malo Golf Mixed Open =

Tournament information
- Location: Saint-Malo, Brittany, France
- Established: 2016
- Course: Saint-Malo Golf Club
- Par: 72
- Length: 6,673 yards (6,102 m)
- Tours: Alps Tour; LET Access Series
- Format: Stroke play
- Prize fund: €45,000
- Month played: July
- Final year: 2019

Tournament record score
- Aggregate: 266 Frédéric Lacroix (2019)
- To par: −22 as above

Final champion
- (France) Frédéric Lacroix

Location map
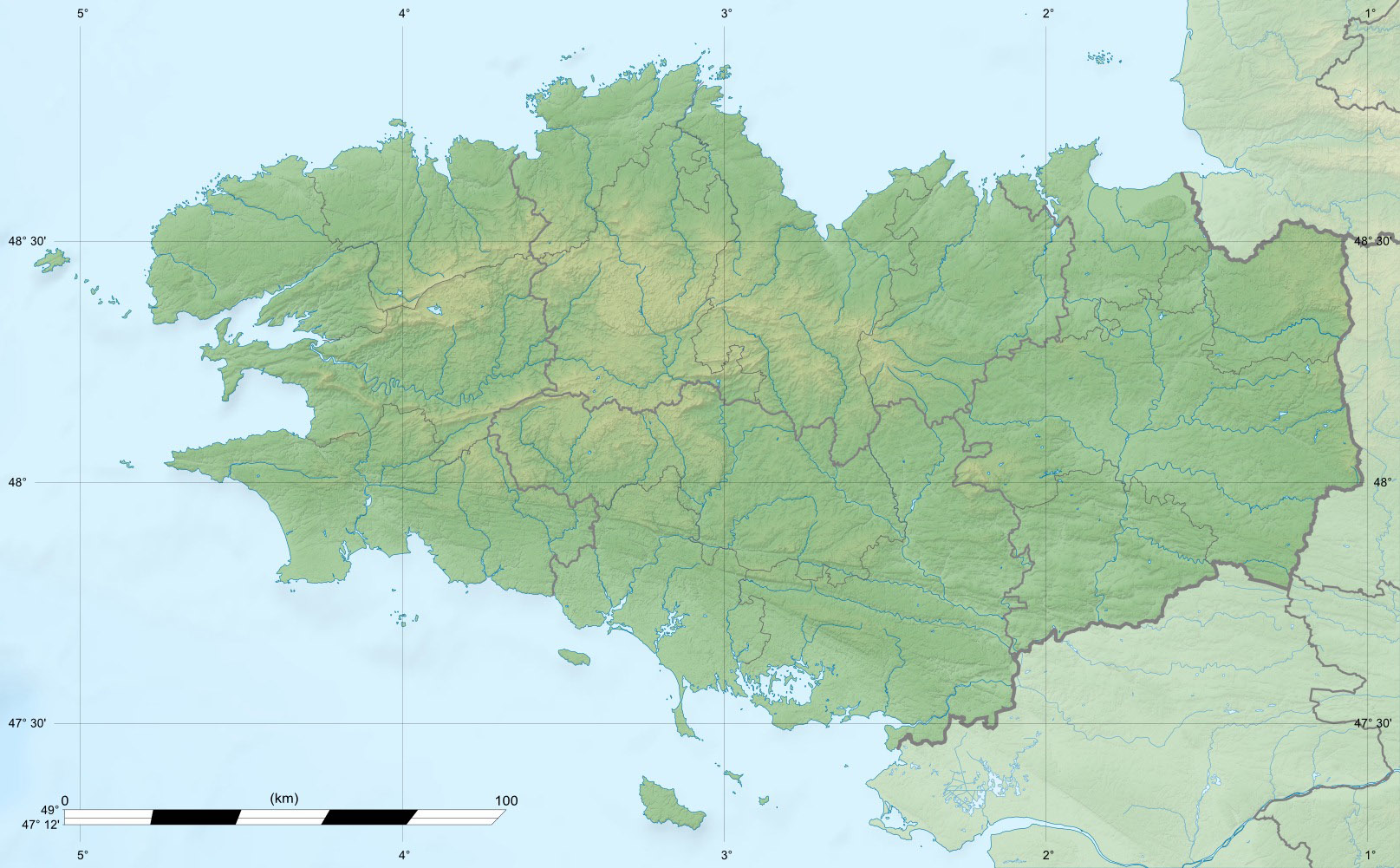
- Location in France Location in Brittany

The Saint-Malo Golf Mixed Open was an annual professional golf tournament played at Saint-Malo Golf Club in Brittany, France. The tournament was part of the Alps Tour starting in 2016, and in 2019 became a mixed event with the LET Access Series.

== Format ==
In 2019 it became the first professional event where female and male players competed for the same trophy and prize fund, while teeing off from different yardages.

The best female player was Manon De Roey of Belgium, who finished solo third, four strokes behind winner Frédéric Lacroix.

== Winners ==
Year	Tour(s) (Note: ALP − Alps Tour; LETAS − LET Access Series.)	Winner	Score	To par	Margin of victory	Runner(s)-up
Saint-Malo Golf Mixed Open
2020 (Note: Mixed event)	ALP, LETAS	Cancelled due to the COVID-19 pandemic				
2019	ALP, LETAS	(France) Frédéric Lacroix	266	−22	2 strokes	(Italy) Enrico Di Nitto
Saint-Malo Golf Open
2018	ALP	(France) Alexandre Fuchs (a)	270	−18	2 strokes	(Spain) Santiago Tarrío (Netherlands) Davey Porsius
2017	ALP	(France) Thomas Boulanger (a)	270	−18	Playoff	(France) Robin Roussel
Open de Saint-Malo
2016	ALP	(Italy) Stefano Pitoni	203	−13	Playoff	(France) Raphael Marguery

== See also ==
- Hauts de France – Pas de Calais Golf Open
