= Michael Hoey (golfer) =

Northern Irish professional golfer (born 1979)

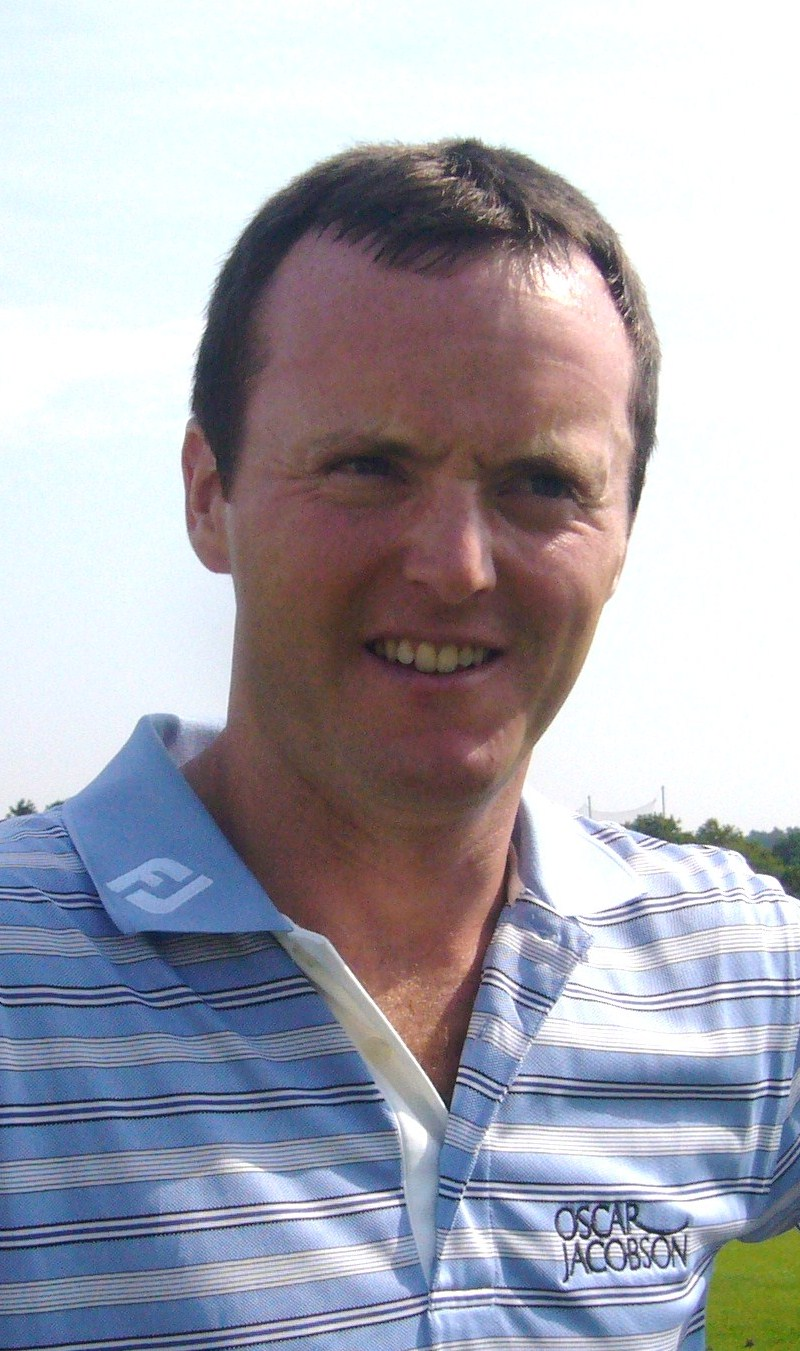
- Hoey in 2009

Personal information
- Full name: Michael George Wilfred Hoey
- Nationality: Northern Ireland
- Born: 13 February 1979 (age 47) Ballymoney, Northern Ireland
- Height: 1.83 m (6 ft 0 in)
- Weight: 80 kg (176 lb; 12 st 8 lb)
- Spouse: Beverley Hoey (m. 2011)
- Children: 1

Career
- Sport: Golf
- College: Clemson University
- Turned professional: 2002
- Former tours: European Tour; Challenge Tour
- Professional wins: 8
- Highest ranking: 74 (25 March 2012)

Number of wins by tour
- European Tour: 5
- Challenge Tour: 4

Best results in major championships
- Masters Tournament: CUT: 2002
- PGA Championship: DQ: 2012
- U.S. Open: DNP
- The Open Championship: CUT: 2001, 2012

Michael George Wilfred Hoey (born 13 February 1979) is a retired Northern Irish professional golfer who played on the European Tour and the Challenge Tour.

== Amateur career ==
Hoey was born in Ballymoney but played much of his early golf at Shandon Park Golf Club in East Belfast. He won the British Amateur Championship in 2001 and was a member of the victorious 2001 Great Britain & Ireland Walker Cup team. As British Amateur Champion, he was invited to play in the Masters Tournament in 2002, where he missed the cut by a single stroke. He turned professional later that year. He played his collegiate golf at Clemson University.

== Professional career ==
Until 2009, Hoey had struggled to secure his place on the main European Tour and had mostly competed in the second tier Challenge Tour where he has three tournament victories, the 2005 BA-CA Golf Open, the 2007 Tessali-Metaponto Open di Puglia e Basilicata, and the 2008 Banque Populaire Moroccan Classic. He finished 8th on the end of season rankings in 2005, which gave him automatic promotion to the European Tour. Following a largely unsuccessful début season in 2006, he returned to the Challenge Tour the following year. He regained his playing privileges on the European Tour for the 2009 season at final qualifying school.

Early in 2009, Hoey finished runner-up to Retief Goosen in the Africa Open on the Sunshine Tour. Then in April, he claimed his first European Tour title, at the Estoril Open de Portugal where he defeated Gonzalo Fernández-Castaño on the third hole of a sudden death playoff. The win also gave him a one-year exemption on the European Tour. He won twice in 2011, including his most prestigious title to date at the Alfred Dunhill Links Championship. He picked up his fourth victory on the European Tour in 2012 at the Trophée Hassan II.

In July 2013, Hoey won his fifth European Tour title at the M2M Russian Open, prevailing by four strokes from Alexandre Kaleka and Matthew Nixon. His victory was set up by a third round score of 65, which took him into the lead heading into the final round.

Hoey represented Ireland, alongside Gareth Maybin at the 2007 Omega Mission Hills World Cup where they finished in 24th position.

In February 2022, Hoey announced his retirement from professional golf, becoming a referee on the European Tour.

== Amateur wins ==
- 1998 Irish Amateur Open Championship
- 2001 Amateur Championship

== Professional wins (8) ==
=== European Tour wins (5) ===
No.	Date	Tournament	Winning score	Margin of victory	Runner(s)-up
1	5 Apr 2009	Estoril Open de Portugal	−7 (66-76-69-66=277)	Playoff	(Spain) Gonzalo Fernández-Castaño
2	22 May 2011	Madeira Islands Open^{1}	−10 (72-68-67-71=278)	2 strokes	(England) Jamie Elson, (England) Chris Gane
3	2 Oct 2011	Alfred Dunhill Links Championship	−22 (66-66-66-68=266)	2 strokes	(Northern Ireland) Rory McIlroy
4	25 Mar 2012	Trophée Hassan II	−17 (74-67-65-65=271)	3 strokes	(Republic of Ireland) Damien McGrane
5	28 Jul 2013	M2M Russian Open	−16 (70-67-65-70=272)	4 strokes	(France) Alexandre Kaleka, (England) Matthew Nixon

^{1}Dual-ranking event with the Challenge Tour

European Tour playoff record (1–0)

No.	Year	Tournament	Opponent	Result
1	2009	Estoril Open de Portugal	(Spain) Gonzalo Fernández-Castaño	Won with par on third extra hole

=== Challenge Tour wins (4) ===
No.	Date	Tournament	Winning score	Margin of victory	Runner(s)-up
1	4 Sep 2005	BA-CA Golf Open	−19 (67-64-67-67=265)	1 stroke	(Sweden) Steven Jeppesen
2	22 Apr 2007	Tessali-Metaponto Open di Puglia e Basilicata	−13 (66-67-68-71=272)	Playoff	(Wales) Liam Bond
3	4 May 2008	Banque Populaire Moroccan Classic	−12 (67-70-71-68=276)	1 stroke	(Scotland) Greig Hutcheon, (France) Julien Quesne
4	22 May 2011	Madeira Islands Open^{1}	−10 (72-68-67-71=278)	2 strokes	(England) Jamie Elson, (England) Chris Gane

^{1}Dual-ranking event with the European Tour

Challenge Tour playoff record (1–1)

No.	Year	Tournament	Opponent(s)	Result
1	2007	Tessali-Metaponto Open di Puglia e Basilicata	(Wales) Liam Bond	Won with birdie on first extra hole
2	2021	B-NL Challenge Trophy	(Spain) Alfredo García-Heredia, (Denmark) Marcus Helligkilde, (Iceland) Haraldur Magnús	García-Heredia won with birdie on seventh extra hole Magnús eliminated by par on third hole Hoey eliminated by birdie on first hole

== Results in major championships ==
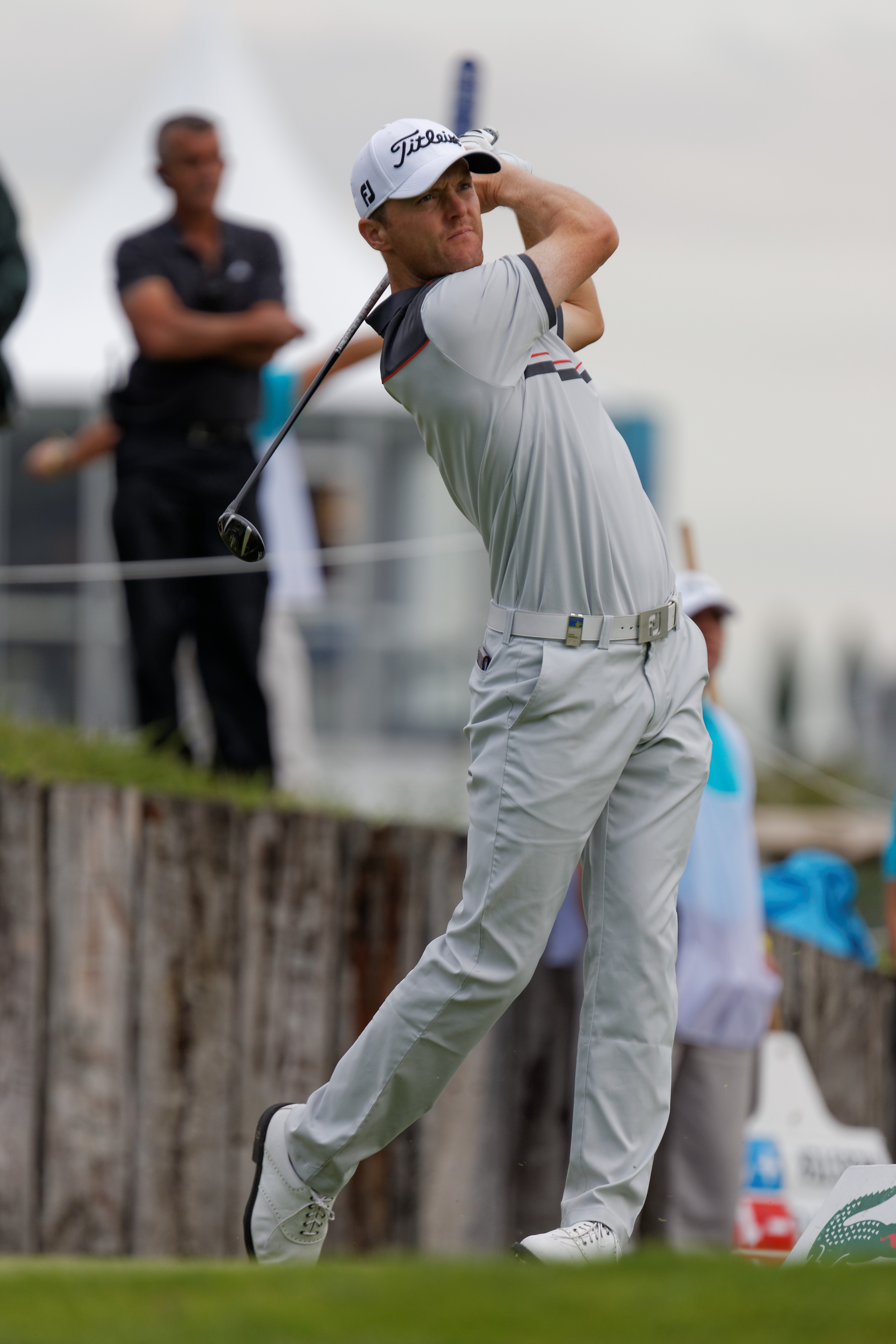
Michael Hoey

Tournament	2001	2002	2003	2004	2005	2006	2007	2008	2009
Masters Tournament		CUT							
U.S. Open									
The Open Championship	CUT								
PGA Championship									

Tournament	2010	2011	2012	2013	2014
Masters Tournament					
U.S. Open					
The Open Championship			CUT		WD
PGA Championship			DQ		

Did not play

CUT = missed the half-way cut
DQ = disqualified
WD = withdrew
"T" = tied

== Results in World Golf Championships ==
Tournament	2011	2012
Match Play		
Championship		
Invitational		T71
Champions	T62	

Did not play

"T" = Tied

== Team appearances ==
Amateur

- European Youths' Team Championship (representing Ireland): 1998, 2000
- European Amateur Team Championship (representing Ireland): 1999, 2001
- Palmer Cup (representing Great Britain & Ireland): 1999
- Walker Cup (representing Great Britain & Ireland): 2001 (winners)

Professional

- World Cup (representing Ireland): 2007
- European Championships (representing Ireland): 2018

== See also ==
- 2005 Challenge Tour graduates
- 2008 European Tour Qualifying School graduates
- List of golfers with most Challenge Tour wins
