= Tarrio =

Tarrio is a surname. Notable people with the surname include:

- Henry "Enrique" Tarrio (born 1984 or 1985), American far-right activist
- Santiago Tarrío Ben (born 1990), Spanish golfer
