= Max Rottluff =

German professional golfer

Personal information
- Full name: Maximilian Rottluff
- Nationality: Germany
- Born: 29 January 1993 (age 33) Düsseldorf, Germany
- Height: 6 ft 0 in (183 cm)
- Weight: 172 lb (78 kg)

Career
- Sport: Golf
- College: Arizona State University
- Turned professional: 2016
- Current tour: Asian Tour
- Former tours: European Tour; Korn Ferry Tour; Challenge Tour; PGA Tour Canada
- Professional wins: 4

Number of wins by tour
- Challenge Tour: 2
- Other: 2

Maximilian Rottluff (born 29 January 1993) is a German professional golfer and European Tour player. He graduated from the Challenge Tour where he won two events.

== Amateur career ==
Rottluff became a member of the German National Team in late 2009. He lost the final of the 2010 Boys Amateur Championship, 4 and 3, to Adrián Otaegui. In 2011, he won the German Team Championship and represented Europe at the Jacques Léglise Trophy. Rottluff went on to represent Germany at the 2012 Eisenhower Trophy in a team with Marcel Schneider and Moritz Lampert. Their team finished in a tie for third behind the United States and Mexico alongside South Korea and France.

Rottluff attended Arizona State University 2012–2016. Playing with the Arizona State Sun Devils men's golf team under coach Tim Mickelson he recorded a stroke average of 69.81 in 2014–15, behind only his teammate Jon Rahm (69.15). He was a first-team All-American and reached the top-20 in the World Amateur Golf Ranking.

== Professional career ==
Rotluff turned professional in 2016 and joined the PGA Tour Canada, where he played for two years and won twice, including the 2016 SIGA Dakota Dunes Open for his first professional title. He then played on the Korn Ferry Tour 2018–2021, where his best finish was a T4 at the 2018 KC Golf Classic and 2020 Evans Scholars Invitational.

In 2022, he joined the Challenge Tour where he won two titles in 2023, to graduate to the European Tour for the 2024 season.

== Personal life ==
Rotluff's father is a former professional ice-hockey player and his sister has played collegiate golf at the College of Charleston.

== Amateur wins ==
- 2009 Harder German Junior Masters
- 2010 Scottish Youths Open, United States Junior Masters, Junior Orange Bowl International
- 2012 Turkish Amateur Open
- 2013 German International Amateur
- 2014 Alister MacKenzie Invitational
- 2015 Arizona Intercollegiate

== Professional wins (4) ==
=== Challenge Tour wins (2) ===
No.	Date	Tournament	Winning score	Margin of victory	Runner(s)-up
1	7 May 2023	UAE Challenge	−14 (68-73-63-70=274)	1 stroke	(France) Ugo Coussaud
2	3 Sep 2023	Indoor Golf Group Challenge	−21 (68-64-66-65=263)	3 strokes	(Denmark) Jeppe Kristian Andersen, (Sweden) Jesper Svensson

=== PGA Tour Canada wins (2) ===
No.	Date	Tournament	Winning score	Margin of victory	Runner-up
1	26 Jun 2016	SIGA Dakota Dunes Open	−23 (67-65-67-66=265)	1 stroke	(United States) Carter Jenkins
2	11 Jun 2017	Bayview Place Cardtronics Open	−16 (70-64-63-67=264)	1 stroke	(United States) T. J. Vogel

== Team appearances ==
Amateur

- Jacques Léglise Trophy (representing Continental Europe): 2011
- Duke of York Young Champions Trophy (representing Germany): 2011
- Eisenhower Trophy (representing Germany): 2012, 2014
- European Amateur Team Championship (representing Germany): 2013, 2014, 2015
- Palmer Cup (representing Europe): 2015

Professional

- Aruba Cup (representing PGA Tour Canada): 2016, 2017 (winners)

== See also ==
- 2023 Challenge Tour graduates
