= 2020 Pro Golf Tour =

Golf tour season

2020 Pro Golf Tour season
- Duration: 13 January 2020 – 29 September 2020
- Number of official events: 13 (Note: A further four events were scheduled but were cancelled.)
- Most wins: (Germany) Thomas Rosenmüller (3)
- Order of Merit: (Germany) Thomas Rosenmüller

The 2020 Pro Golf Tour was the 24th season of the Pro Golf Tour (formerly the EPD Tour), a third-tier tour recognised by the European Tour.

== Schedule ==
The following table lists official events during the 2020 season.

Date	Tournament	Host country	Purse (€)	Winner (Note: The number in brackets after each winner's name is the number of Pro Golf Tour events they had won up to and including that tournament. It is rare for someone to accumulate many wins on the Pro Golf Tour as success at this level usually leads to promotion to the Challenge Tour.)	OWGR points
15 Jan	Red Sea Egyptian Classic	Egypt	30,000	(France) Victor Veyret (1)	4
20 Jan	Red Sea Ain Sokhna Classic	Egypt	30,000	(France) Jean Bekirian (1)	4
13 Feb	Open Palmeraie Country Club	Morocco	30,000	(Germany) Thomas Rosenmüller (1)	4
19 Feb	Open Casa Green Golf	Morocco	30,000	(France) Julien Brun (1)	4
5 Mar	Open Royal Golf Anfa Mohammedia	Morocco	30,000	(Germany) Nick Bachem (a) (1)	4
11 Mar	Open Bahia Golf Beach	Morocco	30,000	(Switzerland) Jeremy Freiburghaus (1)	4
~~27 Mar~~	Open Ocean	Morocco	–	Cancelled	–
~~2 Apr~~	Open Tazegzout	Morocco	–	Cancelled	–
~~15 Apr~~	Open Madaef Golfs	Morocco	–	Cancelled	–
~~21 Apr~~	Open Michlifen	Morocco	–	Cancelled	–
31 Jul	Gradi Polish Open	Poland	30,000	(France) Julien Brun (2)	4
6 Aug	Raiffeisen Pro Golf Tour St. Pölten	Austria	30,000	(Czech Republic) Aleš Kořínek (1)	4
19 Aug	Starnberg Open	Germany	30,000	(Germany) Marc Hammer (a) (1)	4
29 Aug	Altepro Trophy	Czech Republic	30,000	(Germany) Thomas Rosenmüller (2)	4
3 Sep	Schladming Dachstein Open	Austria	30,000	(Germany) Thomas Rosenmüller (3)	4
9 Sep	Haugschlag NÖ Open	Austria	30,000	(Switzerland) Jeremy Freiburghaus (2)	4
29 Sep	Castanea Resort Championship	Germany	50,000	(Germany) Philipp Mejow (4)	4

== Order of Merit ==
The Order of Merit was based on tournament results during the season, calculated using a points-based system. The top three players on the Order of Merit earned status to play on the 2021 Challenge Tour.

Position	Player	Points	Status earned
1	(Germany) Thomas Rosenmüller	25,365	Promoted to Challenge Tour
2	(France) Julien Brun	24,234	Promoted to Challenge Tour
3	(Switzerland) Jeremy Freiburghaus	19,147	Promoted to Challenge Tour
4	(France) Jean Bekirian	15,541	
5	(Germany) Philipp Mejow	12,496	
6	(France) Victor Veyret	12,379	
7	(Poland) Mateusz Gradecki	12,074	
8	(Switzerland) Marco Iten	9,337	
9	(Germany) Michael Hirmer	7,980	
10	(Czech Republic) Aleš Kořínek	7,583	
