= Haraldur Magnús =

Icelandic professional golfer

Personal information
- Full name: Haraldur Franklín Magnús
- Nationality: Iceland
- Born: 16 March 1991 (age 35) Reykjavík, Iceland
- Height: 5 ft 11 in (180 cm)

Career
- Sport: Golf
- College: University of Louisiana at Lafayette
- Turned professional: 2016
- Current tour: Challenge Tour
- Former tour: Nordic Golf League

Best results in major championships
- Masters Tournament: DNP
- PGA Championship: DNP
- U.S. Open: DNP
- The Open Championship: CUT: 2018

Haraldur Franklín Magnús (born 16 March 1991) is an Icelandic professional golfer who plays on the Challenge Tour. He participated in the 2018 Open Championship, becoming the first Icelandic golfer to compete in a men's major golf championship.

== Early life ==
Magnús grew up in Reykjavík, Iceland, and attended college at the University of Louisiana at Lafayette.

== Career ==
Magnús played in the 2015 Amateur Championship and turned professional in the following year. In 2018, he came through final qualifying for the 2018 Open Championship at Prince's Golf Club. A second-round 78 saw him miss the cut.

In 2021, Magnús finish tied for the lead after 72 holes at the B-NL Challenge Trophy on the Challenge Tour. He entered into a four-way playoff with Alfredo García-Heredia, Marcus Helligkilde and Michael Hoey. He was eliminated on the third hole.

== Playoff record ==
Challenge Tour playoff record (0–1)

No.	Year	Tournament	Opponents	Result
1	2021	B-NL Challenge Trophy	(Spain) Alfredo García-Heredia, (Denmark) Marcus Helligkilde, (Northern Ireland) Michael Hoey	García-Heredia won with birdie on seventh extra hole Magnús eliminated by par on third hole Hoey eliminated by birdie on first hole

== Results in major championships ==
Tournament	2018
Masters Tournament	
U.S. Open	
The Open Championship	CUT
PGA Championship	

Did not play

CUT = missed the half-way cut

== Team appearances ==
Amateur

- European Boys' Team Championship (representing Iceland): 2008
