= Jeremy Freiburghaus =

Swiss professional golfer

Personal information
- Nationality: Switzerland
- Born: 31 May 1996 (age 30) Domat/Ems, Graubünden, Switzerland

Career
- Sport: Golf
- Turned professional: 2019
- Current tour: Challenge Tour
- Former tours: European Tour; Pro Golf Tour
- Professional wins: 4

Number of wins by tour
- Challenge Tour: 1
- Other: 3

Jeremy Freiburghaus (born 31 May 1996) is a Swiss professional golfer who plays on the European Tour. He won the 2022 English Trophy on the Challenge Tour.

== Early life and amateur career ==
Freiburghaus started competing internationally at a young age, and won the 2012 Finnish International Junior. In 2015, he won the Memorial Olivier Barras in Crans-sur-Sierre, a professional tournament.

He represented Switzerland in the European Young Masters, European Boys' Team Championship and European Amateur Team Championship, plus twice in the Eisenhower Trophy.

== Professional career ==
Freiburghaus turned professional in 2019 and joined the Pro Golf Tour. In 2020, he won two events and was runner-up at the Polish Open, and finished 3rd in the Order of Merit to earn promotion to the Challenge Tour.

In 2022, Freiburghaus was runner-up at the Dormy Open and the Scottish Challenge. He claimed his first Challenge Tour title after defeating Max Schmitt in a playoff at the English Trophy. With the win, he moved into the number one position on the Challenge Tour Rankings and ended the season second in the rankings, behind Nathan Kimsey, to graduate to the European Tour for 2023.

Freiburghaus became the first Swiss golfer in 20 years to qualify for the European Tour. He made the cut in his first start as a member of the European Tour, at the Joburg Open.

== Amateur wins ==
- 2012 Finnish International Junior
- 2017 Northern Amateur Open
- 2018 Ticino Championship

== Professional wins (4) ==
=== Challenge Tour wins (1) ===
No.	Date	Tournament	Winning score	Margin of victory	Runner-up
1	16 Oct 2022	English Trophy	−22 (68-65-67-66=266)	Playoff	(Germany) Max Schmitt

Challenge Tour playoff record (1–1)

No.	Year	Tournament	Opponent	Result
1	2022	Farmfoods Scottish Challenge	(Spain) Javier Sainz	Lost to birdie on second extra hole
2	2022	English Trophy	(Germany) Max Schmitt	Won with par on first extra hole

=== Pro Golf Tour wins (2) ===
No.	Date	Tournament	Winning score	Margin of victory	Runners-up
1	15 Mar 2020	Open Bahia Golf Beach	−17 (65-67-67=199)	9 strokes	(Germany) Yannik Emmert, (Morocco) Othman Raouzi, (France) Victor Veyret
2	13 Sep 2020	Haugschlag NÖ Open	−17 (67-67-65=199)	1 stroke	(France) Jean Bekirian, (Germany) Philipp Matlari (a)

=== Other wins (1) ===
- 2015 Memorial Olivier Barras (as an amateur)

== Team appearances ==
Amateur

- European Boys' Team Championship (representing Switzerland): 2011, 2012, 2013
- European Young Masters (representing Switzerland): 2012
- Duke of York Young Champions Trophy (representing Switzerland): 2013
- European Amateur Team Championship (representing Switzerland): 2015, 2016, 2017
- Eisenhower Trophy (representing Switzerland): 2016, 2018

== See also ==
- 2022 Challenge Tour graduates
