= Espen Kofstad =

Norwegian professional golfer

Personal information
- Nationality: Norway
- Born: 11 August 1987 (age 39) Oslo, Norway
- Height: 1.88 m (6 ft 2 in)
- Weight: 76 kg (168 lb; 12.0 st)

Career
- Sport: Golf
- College: University of Denver
- Turned professional: 2011
- Former tours: European Tour; Challenge Tour
- Professional wins: 4

Number of wins by tour
- Challenge Tour: 4

Achievements and awards
- Challenge Tour Rankings winner: 2012

Espen Kofstad (born 11 August 1987) is a Norwegian professional golfer who has played on the European Tour and the Challenge Tour, where he won 4 titles and the 2012 Order of Merit.

== Early life and amateur career ==
Kofstad was born in Oslo and was educated at Perbraten School.

Kofstad played college golf at the University of Denver, where he set the school record for the lowest 54-hole score of 195 and won twice. He entered the first stage of the European Tour qualifying school in 2010. At the final stage, he missed qualification for the European Tour by one stroke.

Kofstad won the Norwegian National Golf Championship twice as an amateur, and represented Norway twice in the World Amateur Team Championships for the Eisenhower Trophy. He reached 18th in the World Amateur Golf Rankings.

He plays for Losby Golf and Country Club.

== Professional career ==
Kofstad turned professional in 2011 and joined the Challenge Tour, where his best finish in his rookie season was a tie for 5th at the Scottish Hydro Challenge. In 2012, he picked up his first victory at the Double Tree by Hilton Acaya Open. With a second victory at the tour's flagship event the Apulia San Domenico Grand Final, he topped the 2012 Order of Merit, and graduated to the European Tour for 2013. His best finish in 2013 was a tie for 8th at the Open de España, two strokes behind winner Raphaël Jacquelin.

Kofstad rose to a career-high 180th in the Official World Golf Ranking and established himself as Norway's highest ranked and most accomplished male golfer prior to the emergence of Viktor Hovland in 2019. He represented Norway at the 2013 World Cup of Golf and at the 2016 Olympic Summer Games in Rio de Janeiro, where he finished tied 43rd.

In 2022, Kofstad played in his first PGA Tour event in the Barbasol Championship, shooting a final round 67 to tie for 16th place.

He announced his retirement from tour golf in October 2024, at age 37.

== Amateur wins ==
- 2008 Norwegian National Golf Championship
- 2010 Norwegian National Golf Championship

== Professional wins (4) ==
=== Challenge Tour wins (4) ===
Legend
Grand Finals (1)
Other Challenge Tour (3)

No.	Date	Tournament	Winning score	Margin of victory	Runner(s)-up
1	22 Jul 2012	Double Tree by Hilton Acaya Open	−9 (72-69-65-65=271)	1 stroke	(Denmark) Joachim B. Hansen
2	27 Oct 2012	Apulia San Domenico Grand Final	−19 (65-66-67-67=265)	1 stroke	(England) James Busby, (Denmark) Joachim B. Hansen
3	10 Jul 2016	D+D Real Slovakia Challenge	−17 (67-65-75-64=271)	Playoff	(France) Romain Langasque
4	20 Aug 2021	Sydbank Esbjerg Challenge^{1}	−11 (68-70-68-67=273)	Playoff	(Scotland) Ewen Ferguson

^{1}Co-sanctioned by the Nordic Golf League

Challenge Tour playoff record (2–0)

No.	Year	Tournament	Opponent	Result
1	2016	D+D Real Slovakia Challenge	(France) Romain Langasque	Won with birdie on second extra hole
2	2021	Sydbank Esbjerg Challenge	(Scotland) Ewen Ferguson	Won with birdie on first extra hole

== Team appearances ==
Amateur

- European Boys' Team Championship (representing Norway): 2004, 2005
- European Amateur Team Championship (representing Norway): 2008, 2009, 2010
- Eisenhower Trophy (representing Norway): 2008, 2010
- St Andrews Trophy (representing the Continent of Europe): 2010 (winners)

Professional

- World Cup (representing Norway): 2013

== See also ==
- 2012 Challenge Tour graduates
- 2014 European Tour Qualifying School graduates
- 2016 European Tour Qualifying School graduates
- 2021 Challenge Tour graduates
- List of golfers with most Challenge Tour wins
