= 2016 Alps Tour =

Golf tour season

2016 Alps Tour season
- Duration: 9 February 2016 – 23 October 2016
- Number of official events: 17
- Most wins: (England) Matt Wallace (6)
- Order of Merit: (England) Matt Wallace

The 2016 Alps Tour was the 16th season of the Alps Tour, a third-tier golf tour recognised by the European Tour.

== Schedule ==
The following table lists official events during the 2016 season.

Date	Tournament	Host country	Purse (€)	Winner (Note: The number in brackets after each winner's name is the number of Alps Tour events they had won up to and including that tournament. It is rare for someone to accumulate many wins on the Alps Tour as success at this level usually leads to promotion to the Challenge Tour.)	OWGR points
11 Feb	Ein Bay Open	Egypt	30,000	(France) Franck Daux (1)	4
17 Feb	Red Sea Little Venice Open	Egypt	30,000	(France) Franck Daux (2)	4
23 Feb	Dreamland Pyramids Open	Egypt	30,000	(England) Matt Wallace (1)	4
1 May	Tunisian Golf Open	Tunisia	70,000	(England) Matt Wallace (2)	6
8 May	Gösser Open	Austria	42,500	(England) Matt Wallace (3)	4
21 May	Vigevano Open	Italy	40,000	(England) Matt Wallace (4)	4
4 Jun	Open de Saint François Region Guadeloupe	Guadeloupe	43,000	(France) Léo Lespinasse (1)	4
17 Jun	Open La Pinetina – Memorial Giorgio Bordoni	Italy	40,000	(Italy) Stefano Pitoni (1)	4
26 Jun	Open de la Mirabelle d'Or	France	45,000	(France) Hubert Tisserand (a) (1)	6
2 Jul	Open Frassanelle	Italy	40,000	(England) Matt Wallace (5)	4
9 Jul	Open de Saint-Malo	France	40,000	(Italy) Stefano Pitoni (2)	4
23 Jul	Alps de Las Castillas	Spain	48,000	(France) Victor Perez (1)	4
26 Aug	Open Castello di Tolcinasco	Italy	40,000	(France) Thomas Elissalde (3)	4
11 Sep	Citadelle Trophy International	France	48,000	(Italy) Federico Maccario (2)	6
18 Sep	Alps Costa del Sol	Spain	48,000	(England) Tom Shadbolt (1)	6
16 Oct	Abruzzo Open	Italy	45,000	(Italy) Stefano Pitoni (3)	6
23 Oct	Alps Tour Grand Final	Italy	65,000	(England) Matt Wallace (6)	6

== Order of Merit ==
The Order of Merit was based on tournament results during the season, calculated using a points-based system. The top five players on the Order of Merit (not otherwise exempt) earned status to play on the 2017 Challenge Tour.

Position	Player	Points	Status earned
1	(England) Matt Wallace	49,703	Promoted to Challenge Tour
2	(Italy) Enrico Di Nitto	25,070	Qualified for Challenge Tour (made cut in Q School)
3	(Italy) Federico Maccario	23,209	Promoted to Challenge Tour
4	(England) Tom Shadbolt	22,931	Promoted to Challenge Tour
5	(France) Victor Perez	22,633	Promoted to Challenge Tour
6	(France) Franck Daux	22,608	Promoted to Challenge Tour
7	(Italy) Stefano Pitoni	21,805	
8	(France) Thomas Elissalde	18,467	
9	(France) Raphaël Marguery	17,232	
10	(Austria) Robin Goger	15,863	
