= Open de Provence =

Hopps Open de Provence
Tournament information
- Location: Mallemort, France
- Established: 2018
- Course: Golf International de Pont Royal
- Par: 72
- Length: 6,951 yards (6,356 m)
- Tour: Challenge Tour
- Format: Stroke play
- Prize fund: €260,000
- Month played: October
- Final year: 2023

Tournament record score
- Aggregate: 268 Lucas Vacarisas (2023)
- To par: −20 as above

Final champion
- (Spain) Lucas Vacarisas

Location map
- Location in France Location in Provence-Alpes-Côte d'Azur

The Hopps Open de Provence was a golf tournament on the Challenge Tour. It was first played in September 2018 at Golf International de Pont Royal in Mallemort, Bouches-du-Rhône, France.

The main sponsor of the tournament was Hopps Group, a French holding company managing six subsidiaries in the field of logistics, postal parcels and door-to-door sales.

== Winners ==
Year	Winner	Score	To par	Margin of victory	Runner(s)-up
2023	(Spain) Lucas Vacarisas	268	−20	2 strokes	(Wales) Oliver Farr (France) Félix Mory
2022	(Sweden) Joel Sjöholm	271	−17	3 strokes	(England) Dan Brown (South Africa) Deon Germishuys
2021	(England) Alfie Plant	271	−17	Playoff	(Austria) Lukas Nemecz (Germany) Marcel Schneider
2020	Cancelled due to the COVID-19 pandemic				
2019	(Netherlands) Lars van Meijel	272	−16	1 stroke	(Germany) Sebastian Heisele
2018	(France) Romain Langasque	273	−15	3 strokes	(Switzerland) Joel Girrbach (Sweden) Joel Sjöholm
