= Ugo Coussaud =

French professional golfer(born 1992)

Personal information
- Nationality: France
- Born: 10 October 1992 (age 34) Angoulême, France

Career
- Sport: Golf
- Turned professional: 2016
- Current tour: European Tour
- Former tours: Challenge Tour; Alps Tour
- Professional wins: 4

Number of wins by tour
- Challenge Tour: 1
- Other: 3

Best results in major championships
- Masters Tournament: DNP
- PGA Championship: DNP
- U.S. Open: CUT: 2026
- The Open Championship: DNP

Ugo Coussaud (born 10 October 1992) is a French professional golfer and European Tour player. He was runner-up at the 2024 Commercial Bank Qatar Masters.

== Amateur career ==
Coussaud enjoyed international success as an amateur. He won the 2013 Canadian University & College Championship, and the 2015 the South African Stroke Play Championship. In 2015, he also reached the semi-finals of the Championnat de France - Coupe Ganay, and in 2016, he was runner-up at the Lytham Trophy in England.

Coussaud represented France at the 2016 Eisenhower Trophy together with Jérémy Gandon and Antoine Rozner, where he finish 10th individually. He also played in the 2016 European Amateur Team Championship, where France recorded the best score in the qualification round, but fell to Sweden 2 1/2–5 1/2 in the quarter-finals to finish 5th.

== Professional career ==
Coussaud turned professional in late 2016 and joined the 2017 Alps Tour. He finished runner-up to Lukas Nemecz at the Gösser Open, and secured his maiden professional win the following week at the Open Golf Clément Ader Paris, where he defeated Spanish amateur Adri Arnaus on the 5th hole of a playoff, having started the day 9 shots back of the lead.

Coussaud finished second on the 2017 Alps Tour Order of Merit, to graduate to the 2018 Challenge Tour. He lost the final of the 2019 Andalucía Costa del Sol Match Play 9 to Eirik Tage Johansen 2 and 1, and lost a playoff at the 2022 D+D Real Czech Challenge to Nicolai Kristensen of Denmark.

2023 would be his breakthrough season, where he won The Challenge in India and recorded a further three runner-up finishes at the Cape Town Open, UAE Challenge and Dormy Open, to finish fourth on the season-long rankings and graduate to the European Tour.

In his rookie season on the European Tour, he finished runner-up at the 2024 Qatar Masters, a stroke behind Rikuya Hoshino of Japan.

== Amateur wins ==
- 2012 Open International du Haut Poitou
- 2013 Canadian University & College Championship, Grand Prix du Medoc
- 2015 South African Stroke Play Championship

== Professional wins (4) ==
=== Challenge Tour wins (1) ===
No.	Date	Tournament	Winning score	Margin of victory	Runners-up
1	2 Apr 2023	The Challenge^{1}	−18 (68-67-68-67=270)	1 stroke	(Spain) Manuel Elvira, (Switzerland) Joel Girrbach

^{1}Co-sanctioned by the Professional Golf Tour of India

Challenge Tour playoff record (0–1)

No.	Year	Tournament	Opponent	Result
1	2022	D+D Real Czech Challenge	(Denmark) Nicolai Kristensen	Lost to birdie on first extra hole

=== Alps Tour wins (1) ===
No.	Date	Tournament	Winning score	Margin of victory	Runner-up
1	27 May 2017	Open Golf Clément Ader Paris	−7 (67-76-66=209)	Playoff	(Spain) Adri Arnaus (a)

=== French Tour wins (2) ===
No.	Date	Tournament	Winning score	Margin of victory	Runner(s)-up
1	25 Nov 2017	Internationaux de France Professionels de Double (with Robin Roussel)	−16 (65-70-65=200)	2 strokes	(France) Victor Riu and (France) Alexis Weizman, (France) Antoine Rozner and (France) Olivier Rozner
2	3 May 2025	Championnat de France Professionnel MCA	−10 (68-64-68=200)	4 strokes	(France) Oïhan Guillamoundeguy

== Results in major championships ==
Tournament	2026
Masters Tournament	
PGA Championship	
U.S. Open	CUT
The Open Championship	

Did not play

CUT = missed the half-way cut
T = tied

== Team appearances ==
Amateur

- Eisenhower Trophy (representing France): 2016
- European Amateur Team Championship (representing France): 2016

== See also ==
- 2023 Challenge Tour graduates
