= Matt Wallace (golfer) =

English professional golfer (born 1990)

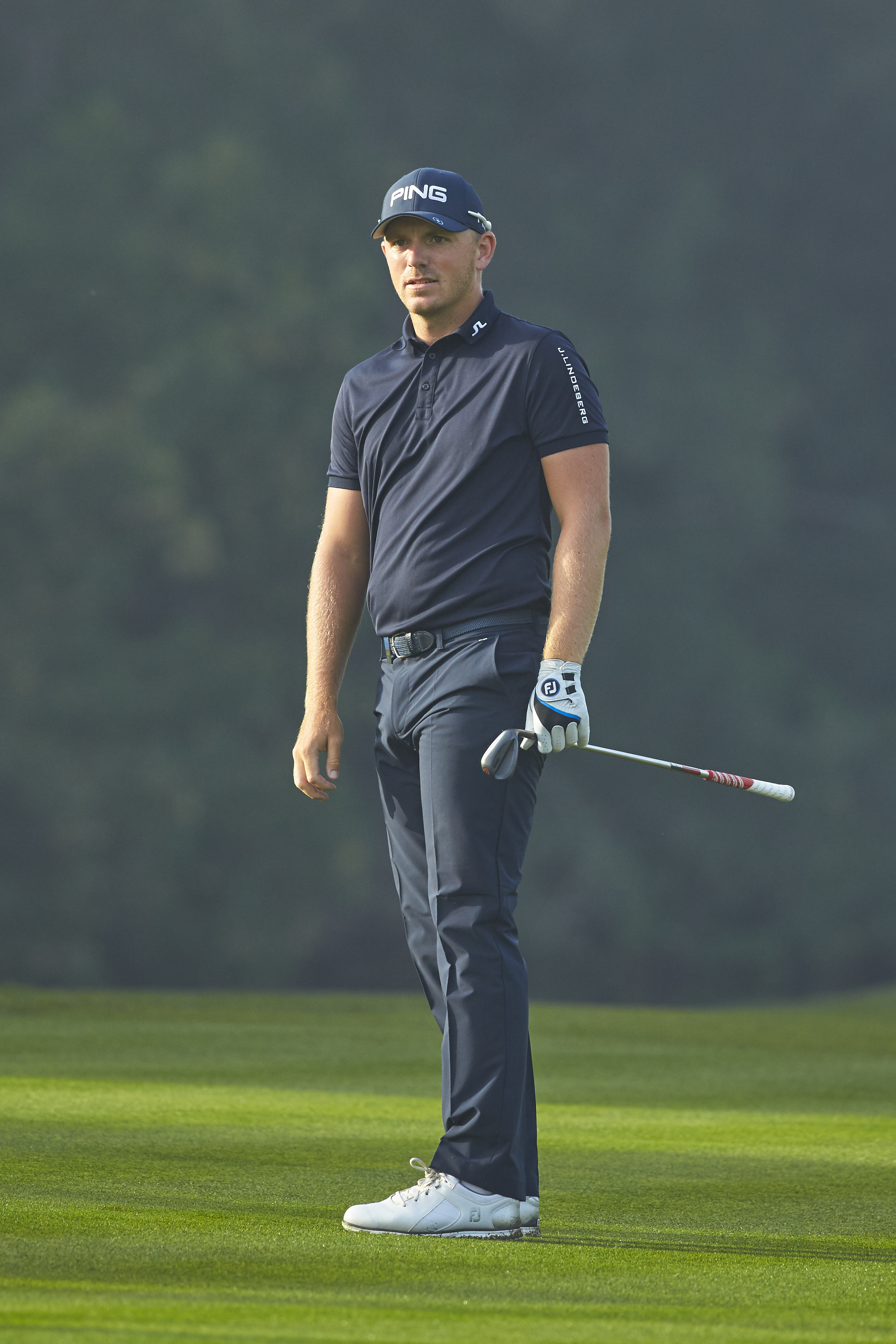

Personal information
- Full name: Matthew Wallace
- Nationality: England
- Born: 12 April 1990 (age 36) Hillingdon, London, England
- Height: 6 ft 0 in (1.83 m)

Career
- Sport: Golf
- College: Jacksonville State University
- Turned professional: 2012
- Current tours: PGA Tour; European Tour
- Former tours: Challenge Tour; Alps Tour
- Professional wins: 12
- Highest ranking: 23 (14 July 2019) (as of 25 October 2026)

Number of wins by tour
- PGA Tour: 1
- European Tour: 5
- Asian Tour: 1
- Challenge Tour: 1
- Other: 6

Best results in major championships
- Masters Tournament: T34: 2021
- PGA Championship: T3: 2019
- U.S. Open: T12: 2019
- The Open Championship: T40: 2021, 2026

Achievements and awards
- Alps Tour Order of Merit winner: 2016

Matthew Wallace (born 12 April 1990) is an English professional golfer who plays on the European Tour and the PGA Tour.

== Collegiate career ==
After growing up in Pinner England and going to Aldenham School, Wallace attended Jacksonville State University, in Northeast Alabama, as a freshman in the 2010–11 season before turning professional. His year in Jacksonville was a successful one that saw him win twice, including the 2011 OVC Championship. He was the OVC Freshman of the Year and held the record for lowest round in school history with a 10-under 62 in the F&M Bank APSU Intercollegiate.

== Professional career ==
In 2016 Wallace won six tournaments on the Alps Tour and won the Order of Merit. This enabled him to join the Challenge Tour in 2017. He started 2017 by finishing tied for third place in the Barclays Kenya Open and in May he won the Open de Portugal, a dual-ranking event with the main European Tour. The win gave him promotion to the European Tour.

=== 2018: Breakout season ===
Wallace won his second European Tour event in March 2018, Hero Indian Open, beating Andrew Johnston in a playoff, making a birdie at the first extra hole. The win lifted him into the world top 100 for the first time. In June Wallace won again at the BMW International Open. He started the final round two strokes behind the leaders, but carded a bogey-free round of 65 to take the title by one stroke. He followed that up with a victory at Made in Denmark in September 2018, collecting birdies at five of the last six holes before coming out on top in a four-man playoff. He finished in a share of fifth at the Nedbank Golf Challenge before tying for second at the season-ending DP World Tour Championship, Dubai to move into the top 50 of the Official World Golf Ranking for the first time.

=== 2019 to present ===
In 2019, Wallace finished tied for 3rd place at the PGA Championship and 12th at the US Open. On the PGA Tour, he finished sixth at the Arnold Palmer Invitational, and on the European Tour, he was runner-up at both the Dubai Desert Classic and the British Masters, and third at the BMW International Open and the KLM Open.

In his first full season on the PGA Tour in 2019–20, Wallace had best results of a tied fourth at Memorial Tournament and tied 12th at the Rocket Mortgage Classic.

In April 2021, Wallace recorded his joint-best finish on the PGA Tour with a solo-third finish at the Valero Texas Open, after being tied for the lead with Jordan Spieth entering the final round. He finished the 2020–21 season in 111th place on the FedEx Cup standings.

Wallace started his 2021–22 PGA Tour season with a share of 14th place at the Shriners Children's Open and fourth place at the Zozo Championship in October 2021; a further top-ten finish at the Rocket Mortgage Classic in July 2022 helped him to 120th place in the end of season FedEx Cup standings to retain his card for 2022–23. Back on the European Tour in August 2022, Wallace finished runner-up at the 2022 Omega European Masters, losing in a playoff to Thriston Lawrence.

In January 2023, Wallace was selected to play in the inaugural Hero Cup, representing the Great Britain and Ireland team, facing Continental Europe, contributing 2.5 points from a possible four, including a singles victory over Thomas Detry, in his team's defeat. On the PGA Tour, in March, he finished tied for seventh in the Valspar Championship; the following week he claimed his first PGA Tour win, at the Corales Puntacana Championship in the Dominican Republic. Returning to Europe in August, Wallace finished second at the D+D Real Czech Masters and followed that up with top-10 finishes at the Alfred Dunhill Links Championship and the Commercial Bank Qatar Masters. He qualified for the DP World Tour Championship and shot a round of 60 on the Saturday, including nine consecutive birdies on the back nine, ending the week in joint second place.

Wallace's highlights of his 2024 PGA Tour season included a share of fourth place at the CJ Cup Byron Nelson before he returned to Europe for the rest of the year. After eighth place at the Betfred British Masters, Wallace picked up a fifth DP World Tour title of his career at the Omega European Masters, beating Alfredo Garcia-Heredia with a birdie in the first play-off hole. He also shared third place at the Abu Dhabi HSBC Championship on the way to 14th place on the DP World Tour's Race to Dubai.

He started 2025 by helping Great Britain & Ireland to a victory over Continental Europe at the Team Cup and ultimately finished 12th on the European Ryder Cup points list, missing out on selection for the 2025 Ryder Cup.

== Professional wins (12) ==
=== PGA Tour wins (1) ===
No.	Date	Tournament	Winning score	Margin of victory	Runner-up
1	26 Mar 2023	Corales Puntacana Championship	−19 (67-66-70-66=269)	1 stroke	(Denmark) Nicolai Højgaard

=== European Tour wins (5) ===
No.	Date	Tournament	Winning score	Margin of victory	Runner(s)-up
1	14 May 2017	Open de Portugal^{1}	−21 (63-66-73-69=271)	3 strokes	(United States) Julian Suri
2	11 Mar 2018	Hero Indian Open^{2}	−11 (69-70-70-68=277)	Playoff	(England) Andrew Johnston
3	24 Jun 2018	BMW International Open	−10 (73-69-71-65=278)	1 stroke	(Germany) Martin Kaymer, (Finland) Mikko Korhonen, (Denmark) Thorbjørn Olesen
4	2 Sep 2018	Made in Denmark	−19 (68-68-66-67=269)	Playoff	(England) Steven Brown, (England) Jonathan Thomson, (England) Lee Westwood
5	8 Sep 2024	Omega European Masters	−11 (64-62-73-70=269)	Playoff	(Spain) Alfredo García-Heredia

^{1}Dual-ranking event with the Challenge Tour
^{2}Co-sanctioned with the Asian Tour

European Tour playoff record (3–1)

No.	Year	Tournament	Opponent(s)	Result
1	2018	Hero Indian Open	(England) Andrew Johnston	Won with birdie on first extra hole
2	2018	Made in Denmark	(England) Steven Brown, (England) Jonathan Thomson, (England) Lee Westwood	Won with birdie on second extra hole Thomson and Westwood eliminated by birdie on first hole
3	2022	Omega European Masters	(South Africa) Thriston Lawrence	Lost to par on first extra hole
4	2024	Omega European Masters	(Spain) Alfredo García-Heredia	Won with birdie on first extra hole

=== Challenge Tour wins (1) ===
No.	Date	Tournament	Winning score	Margin of victory	Runner-up
1	14 May 2017	Open de Portugal^{1}	−21 (63-66-73-69=271)	3 strokes	(United States) Julian Suri

^{1}Dual-ranking event with the European Tour

=== Alps Tour wins (6) ===
No.	Date	Tournament	Winning score	Margin of victory	Runner(s)-up
1	23 Feb 2016	Dreamland Pyramids Open	−8 (67-72-69=208)	1 stroke	(Republic of Ireland) David Carey, (France) Antoine Schwartz
2	1 May 2016	Tunisian Golf Open	−12 (67-68-71-70=276)	2 strokes	(Italy) Enrico Di Nitto
3	8 May 2016	Gösser Open	−20 (66-64-66=196)	8 strokes	(Austria) Robin Goger
4	21 May 2016	Vigevano Open	−17 (65-62-66=193)	3 strokes	(Switzerland) Julien Clement, (France) Franck Daux
5	2 Jul 2016	Open Frassanelle	−17 (66-65-65=196)	4 strokes	(France) Victor Perez
6	22 Oct 2016	Alps Tour Grand Final	−17 (63-70-66-68=267)	1 stroke	(France) Richard Jouven

== Results in major championships ==
Results not in chronological order in 2020.

Tournament	2017	2018
Masters Tournament		
U.S. Open	CUT	CUT
The Open Championship		CUT
PGA Championship		T19

Tournament	2019	2020	2021	2022	2023	2024	2025	2026
Masters Tournament	CUT	T46	T34					
PGA Championship	T3	T77	T55		T65	T43	T17	T44
U.S. Open	T12	T43	CUT				T23	
The Open Championship	T51	NT	T40		CUT	T41	T45	T40

Top 10
Did not play

CUT = missed the half-way cut
"T" indicates a tie for a place
NT = no tournament due to COVID-19 pandemic

=== Summary ===
Tournament	Wins	2nd	3rd	Top-5	Top-10	Top-25	Events	Cuts made
Masters Tournament	0	0	0	0	0	0	3	2
PGA Championship	0	0	1	1	1	3	8	8
U.S. Open	0	0	0	0	0	2	6	3
The Open Championship	0	0	0	0	0	0	7	5
Totals	0	0	1	1	1	5	24	18

- Most consecutive cuts made – 8 (2019 PGA – 2021 PGA)
- Longest streak of top-10s – 1 (once)

== Results in The Players Championship ==
Tournament	2019	2020	2021	2022	2023	2024
The Players Championship	T30	C		CUT	CUT	CUT

Did not play

"T" indicates a tie for a place
CUT = missed the halfway cut
C = Cancelled after the first round due to the COVID-19 pandemic

== Results in World Golf Championships ==
Tournament	2018	2019	2020	2021
Championship		T33	T58	
Match Play		T40	NT^{1}	T28
Invitational		T27	T59	
Champions	T50	T60	NT^{1}	NT^{1}

^{1}Cancelled due to COVID-19 pandemic

Did not play

QF, R16, R32, R64 = Round in which player lost in match play
NT = no tournament
"T" = tied

== Team appearances ==
Professional

- Team Cup (representing Great Britain and Ireland): 2023, 2025 (winners)
