= 2017 Alps Tour =

Golf tour season

2017 Alps Tour season
- Duration: 14 February 2017 – 22 October 2017
- Number of official events: 16
- Most wins: (Spain) Adri Arnaus (2)
- Order of Merit: (Spain) Adri Arnaus

The 2017 Alps Tour was the 17th season of the Alps Tour, a third-tier golf tour recognised by the European Tour.

== Schedule ==
The following table lists official events during the 2017 season.

Date	Tournament	Host country	Purse (€)	Winner (Note: The number in brackets after each winner's name is the number of Alps Tour events they had won up to and including that tournament. It is rare for someone to accumulate many wins on the Alps Tour as success at this level usually leads to promotion to the Challenge Tour.)	OWGR points
16 Feb	Ein Bay Open	Egypt	30,000	(France) Julien Brun (1)	4
22 Feb	Red Sea Little Venice Open	Egypt	30,000	(Netherlands) Lars van Meijel (1)	4
6 May	Alps de Las Castillas	Spain	48,000	(Spain) Sebastián García Rodríguez (1)	4
20 May	Gösser Open	Austria	42,500	(Austria) Lukas Nemecz (1)	4
27 May	Open Golf Clément Ader Paris	France	45,000	(France) Ugo Coussaud (1)	4
3 Jun	Open de Saint François Region Guadeloupe	Guadeloupe	43,000	(France) Thomas Elissalde (4)	4
10 Jun	Villaverde Open	Italy	40,000	(Spain) Adri Arnaus (a) (1)	4
16 Jun	Open La Pinetina – Memorial Giorgio Bordoni	Italy	40,000	(Italy) Marco Crespi (6)	4
25 Jun	Open International de la Mirabelle d'Or	France	45,000	(France) Maxime Radureau (1)	6
9 Jul	Saint-Malo Golf Open	France	45,000	(France) Thomas Boulanger (a) (1)	6
22 Jul	Lignano Open	Italy	40,000	(Austria) Markus Habeler (1)	4
2 Sep	Cervino Open	Italy	40,000	(England) James Sharp (1)	4
10 Sep	Citadelle Trophy International	France	48,000	(France) Edgar Catherine (a) (1)	6
24 Sep	Open Abruzzo	Italy	45,000	(Italy) Guido Migliozzi (1)	6
14 Oct	Alps de Andalucía	Spain	48,000	(Austria) Clemens Gaster (1)	4
22 Oct	Alps Tour Grand Final	Italy	45,000	(Spain) Adri Arnaus (a) (2)	6

== Order of Merit ==
The Order of Merit was based on tournament results during the season, calculated using a points-based system. The top five players on the Order of Merit (not otherwise exempt) earned status to play on the 2018 Challenge Tour.

Position	Player	Points	Status earned
1	(Spain) Adri Arnaus (a)	26,214	Qualified for Challenge Tour (made cut in Q School)
2	(France) Ugo Coussaud	21,535	Promoted to Challenge Tour
3	(France) Antoine Rozner	19,976	Promoted to Challenge Tour
4	(Netherlands) Lars van Meijel	19,306	Promoted to Challenge Tour
5	(France) Robin Roussel	18,551	Promoted to Challenge Tour
6	(Austria) Lukas Nemecz	16,915	Promoted to Challenge Tour
7	(Spain) David Borda	16,861	
8	(France) Jean-Baptiste Gonnet	15,694	
9	(France) Alexandre Daydou	15,303	
10	(France) Maxime Radureau	14,453	
