= Marcus Helligkilde =

Danish professional golfer (born 1996)

Personal information
- Nationality: Denmark
- Born: 5 October 1996 (age 30) Smørumnedre, Denmark

Career
- Sport: Golf
- Turned professional: 2017
- Current tour: European Tour
- Former tours: Challenge Tour; Nordic Golf League
- Professional wins: 7
- Highest ranking: 80 (21 November 2021) (as of 8 November 2026)

Number of wins by tour
- Challenge Tour: 3
- Other: 4

Achievements and awards
- Danish Golf Tour Order of Merit winner: 2020
- Challenge Tour Rankings winner: 2021

Marcus Helligkilde (born 5 October 1996) is a Danish professional golfer. In 2021, he won the Vierumäki Finnish Challenge and Swiss Challenge on the Challenge Tour and finished the season as the winner of the Challenge Tour Rankings.

== Career ==
As an amateur, Helligkilde won the 2015 Turkish Amateur Open Championship and represented Denmark at the 2016 Eisenhower Trophy and the 2017 European Amateur Team Championship.

Helligkilde turned professional in late 2017 and joined the 2018 Nordic Golf League (NGL), where he recorded 10 top-10 finishes and secured his maiden professional title at the Ekerum Öland Masters in September. He finished fifth on the NGL Ranking to earn a Challenge Tour card for 2019.

With limited success on the 2019 Challenge Tour, he found himself back on the 2020 NGL where he won the Lumine Hills Open in Spain in February. He finished secondon the NGL Ranking and again earned a Challenge Tour card for 2021.

Helligkilde found success on the 2021 Challenge Tour and won two tournaments in quick succession, the Vierumäki Finnish Challenge and the Swiss Challenge. He climbed into third place on the Challenge Tour Ranking following his victory at the Swiss Challenge in October, with three tournaments left of the season.

== Amateur wins ==
- 2015 Turkish Amateur Open Championship
- 2016 Hillerod Pokalen, Asserbo Pokalen

== Professional wins (7) ==
=== Challenge Tour wins (3) ===
Legend
Grand Finals (1)
Other Challenge Tour (2)

No.	Date	Tournament	Winning score	Margin of victory	Runner(s)-up
1	8 Aug 2021	Vierumäki Finnish Challenge	−23 (61-67-66-71=265)	2 strokes	(Sweden) Jesper Svensson
2	3 Oct 2021	Swiss Challenge	−25 (65-67-62-69=263)	1 stroke	(Denmark) Nicolai Kristensen, (England) Jonathan Thomson
3	7 Nov 2021	Rolex Challenge Tour Grand Final	−8 (69-67-68-72=276)	1 stroke	(France) Julien Brun, (Portugal) Ricardo Gouveia, (France) Frédéric Lacroix, (Germany) Yannik Paul

Challenge Tour playoff record (0–1)

No.	Year	Tournament	Opponents	Result
1	2021	B-NL Challenge Trophy	(Spain) Alfredo García-Heredia, (Northern Ireland) Michael Hoey, (Iceland) Haraldur Magnús	García-Heredia won with birdie on seventh extra hole Magnús eliminated by par on third hole Hoey eliminated by birdie on first hole

=== Nordic Golf League wins (3) ===
No.	Date	Tournament	Winning score	Margin of victory	Runner-up
1	27 Sep 2018	Ekerum Öland Masters	−9 (63-74-70=207)	1 stroke	(Sweden) Jesper Billing
2	25 Feb 2020	Lumine Hills Open	−13 (69-63-71=203)	2 strokes	(Denmark) Oliver Hundebøll
3	16 Apr 2021	ECCO Tour Spanish Masters	−17 (66-64-69=199)	1 stroke	(Denmark) Morten Ørum Madsen

=== Danish Golf Tour wins (1) ===
No.	Date	Tournament	Winning score	Margin of victory	Runner-up
1	26 Jun 2020	Jyske Bank Danish PGA Championship	−17 (67-65-70=202)	2 strokes	(Denmark) Niklas Nørgaard

== Team appearances ==
Amateur

- European Amateur Team Championship (representing Denmark): 2016, 2017
- Eisenhower Trophy (representing Denmark): 2016

== See also ==
- 2021 Challenge Tour graduates
- 2026 European Tour Qualifying School graduates
