= Alfredo García-Heredia =

Spanish professional golfer (born 1981)

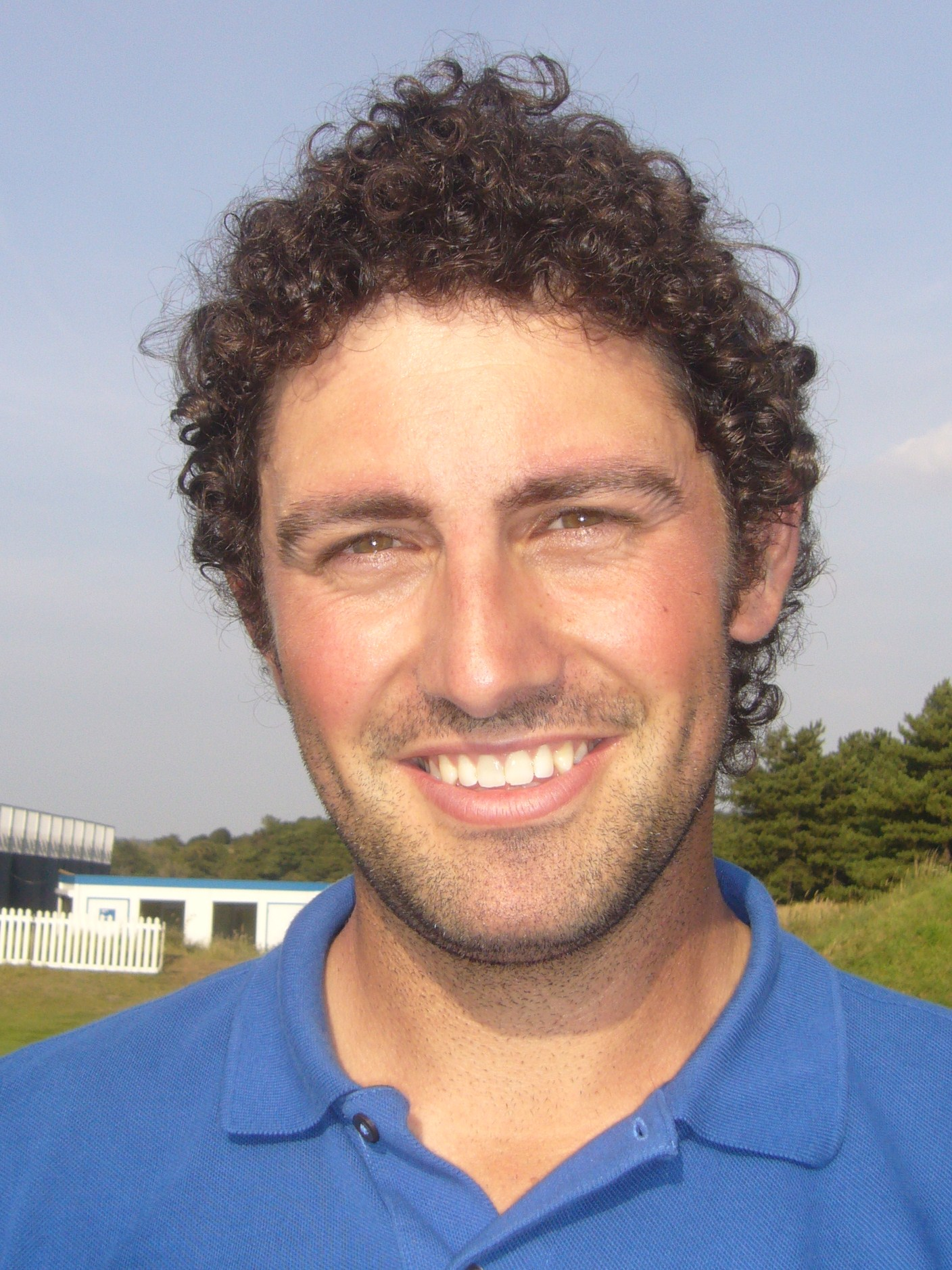

Personal information
- Full name: Alfredo García Heredia
- Nationality: Spain
- Born: 19 December 1981 (age 44) Gijón, Spain
- Height: 185 cm (6 ft 1 in)

Career
- Sport: Golf
- Turned professional: 2005
- Current tour: European Tour
- Former tours: Challenge Tour; Alps Tour
- Professional wins: 3

Number of wins by tour
- Challenge Tour: 1
- Other: 2

Alfredo García-Heredia (born 19 December 1981) is a Spanish professional golfer and European Tour player. He was runner-up at the 2022 AfrAsia Bank Mauritius Open and the 2024 Omega European Masters. He won the 2021 B-NL Challenge Trophy on the Challenge Tour.

== Amateur career ==
García-Heredia was born in Gijón, Asturias, and was introduced to golf by his uncles at age 14. He had a successful amateur career, winning the 2001 and 2004 Spanish Amateur Open Strokeplay Championship.

In 2002, he played for Europe in the Bonallack Trophy in Japan and at the St Andrews Trophy in Switzerland, where he halved his Sunday singles match against Nigel Edwards.

García-Heredia won the 2003 European Amateur Team Championship in the Netherlands, and secured a silver for Spain at the 2004 Eisenhower Trophy in Puerto Rico together with Álvaro Quirós and Rafa Cabrera-Bello.

== Professional career ==
García-Heredia turned professional in 2005 and started playing on the Challenge Tour. He was runner-up at the 2008 Challenge de España behind Andrew McArthur and the 2020 Andalucía Challenge de Cádiz,behind Pep Anglès. He secured his first Challenge Tour win at the 2021 B-NL Challenge Trophy, birdieing the seventh extra hole of a four-man playoff. He finished the 6th in the Challenge Tour rankings to graduate to the 2022 European Tour.

On the European Tour, García-Heredia tied for 4th at the 2008 Open de España, two strokes behind winner Peter Lawrie and also secured a card at Q-School in 2008. He was runner-up at the 2022 AfrAsia Bank Mauritius Open. In 2024, he tied for 10th at Acciona Open de España and lost in a playoff to Matt Wallace at the Omega European Masters to finish a career-best 75th in the Order of Merit, at the age of 42.

== Amateur wins ==
- 2001 Spanish Amateur Open Strokeplay Championship
- 2004 Spanish Amateur Open Strokeplay Championship

== Professional wins (3) ==
=== Challenge Tour wins (1) ===
No.	Date	Tournament	Winning score	Margin of victory	Runners-up
1	29 Aug 2021	B-NL Challenge Trophy	−11 (67-69-69-68=273)	Playoff	(Denmark) Marcus Helligkilde, (Northern Ireland) Michael Hoey (Iceland) Haraldur Magnús

Challenge Tour playoff record (1–0)

No.	Year	Tournament	Opponents	Result
1	2021	B-NL Challenge Trophy	(Northern Ireland) Michael Hoey, (Denmark) Marcus Helligkilde, (Iceland) Haraldur Magnús	Won with birdie on seventh extra hole Magnús eliminated by par on third hole Hoey eliminated by birdie on first hole

=== Alps Tour wins (2) ===
No.	Date	Tournament	Winning score	Margin of victory	Runner-up
1	20 Oct 2012	Castellón Alps Comunidad Valencia	−12 (64-69-71=201)	3 strokes	(France) Johann López Lázaro
2	15 Jul 2018	Fred Olsen Alps de La Gomera	−18 (64-65-66=195)	2 strokes	(France) Pierre Pineau

== Playoff record ==
European Tour playoff record (0–1)

No.	Year	Tournament	Opponent	Result
1	2024	Omega European Masters	(England) Matt Wallace	Lost to birdie on first extra hole

== Team appearances ==
Amateur

- European Amateur Team Championship (representing Spain): 2003 (winners)
- Bonallack Trophy (representing Europe): 2002
- St Andrews Trophy (representing the Continent of Europe): 2002, 2004
- Eisenhower Trophy (representing Spain): 2002, 2004

== See also ==
- 2008 European Tour Qualifying School graduates
- 2010 European Tour Qualifying School graduates
- 2021 Challenge Tour graduates
- 2023 European Tour Qualifying School graduates
