= 2018 Alps Tour =

Golf tour season

2018 Alps Tour season
- Duration: 13 February 2018 – 21 October 2018
- Number of official events: 15 (Note: A further two events were scheduled but were cancelled.)
- Most wins: (Spain) David Borda (2) (Italy) Guido Migliozzi (2) (Spain) Santiago Tarrío (2)
- Order of Merit: (Spain) Santiago Tarrío

The 2018 Alps Tour was the 18th season of the Alps Tour, a third-tier golf tour recognised by the European Tour.

== Schedule ==
The following table lists official events during the 2018 season.

Date	Tournament	Host country	Purse (€)	Winner (Note: The number in brackets after each winner's name is the number of Alps Tour events they had won up to and including that tournament. It is rare for someone to accumulate many wins on the Alps Tour as success at this level usually leads to promotion to the Challenge Tour.)	OWGR points
15 Feb	Ein Bay Open	Egypt	40,000	(Italy) Michele Cea (1)	4
21 Feb	Red Sea Little Venice Open	Egypt	40,000	(England) Jack Singh Brar (1)	4
~~2 Mar~~	Golf Nazionale Open	Italy	–	Cancelled	–
11 Apr	Óbidos International Open	Portugal	30,000	(Spain) David Borda (1)	4
26 May	Gösser Open	Austria	42,500	(Spain) Santiago Tarrío (1)	4
2 Jun	Open de Saint François Region Guadeloupe	Guadeloupe	43,000	(England) Marcus Mohr (1)	4
16 Jun	Alps de Andalucía	Spain	48,000	(France) Alexandre Daydou (1)	4
24 Jun	Open International de la Mirabelle d'Or	France	45,000	(Spain) Santiago Tarrío (2)	6
29 Jun	Memorial Giorgio Bordoni	Italy	40,000	(Italy) Guido Migliozzi (2)	4
8 Jul	Saint-Malo Golf Open	France	45,000	(France) Alexandre Fuchs (a) (1)	6
15 Jul	Fred Olsen Alps de La Gomera	Spain	40,000	(Spain) Alfredo García-Heredia (2)	4
20 Jul	Alps de Las Castillas	Spain	48,000	(France) Thomas Elissalde (5)	4
28 Jul	Des Iles Borromees Open	Italy	40,000	(Italy) Andrea Saracino (1)	4
31 Aug	Cervino Open	Italy	40,000	(Italy) Giacomo Fortini (a) (1)	4
~~9 Sep~~	Citadelle Trophy International	France	–	Cancelled	–
22 Sep	Open Abruzzo	Italy	40,000	(Italy) Guido Migliozzi (3)	4
21 Oct	Alps Tour Grand Final	Italy	45,000	(Spain) David Borda (2)	6

== Order of Merit ==
The Order of Merit was based on tournament results during the season, calculated using a points-based system. The top five players on the Order of Merit (not otherwise exempt) earned status to play on the 2019 Challenge Tour.

Position	Player	Points	Status earned
1	(Spain) Santiago Tarrío	26,702	Promoted to Challenge Tour
2	(Spain) David Borda	25,713	Qualified for European Tour (Top 25 in Q School)
3	(France) Alexandre Daydou	21,813	Promoted to Challenge Tour
4	(France) Louis Cohen-Boyer	21,157	Promoted to Challenge Tour
5	(England) Marcus Mohr	16,809	Promoted to Challenge Tour
6	(Italy) Andrea Saracino	16,122	Promoted to Challenge Tour
7	(France) Xavier Poncelet	15,850	
8	(Republic of Ireland) Conor O'Rourke	13,349	
9	(France) Julien Forêt	12,963	
10	(France) Teremoana Beaucousin	12,839	
