= B-NL Challenge Trophy =

Tournament information
- Location: Deldenerbroek, Netherlands
- Established: 2020
- Course: Twentsche Golf Club
- Par: 71
- Length: 6,822 yards (6,238 m)
- Tour: Challenge Tour
- Format: Stroke play
- Prize fund: €250,000
- Month played: May
- Final year: 2023

Tournament record score
- Aggregate: 268 Alexander Knappe (2022)
- To par: −20 as above

Final champion
- (Sweden) Jesper Svensson

Location map
- Location in the Netherlands

The B-NL Challenge Trophy was a golf tournament on the Challenge Tour, played in the Netherlands and Belgium in alternating years.

The tournament was supported by the Netherlands Golf Federation (NGF) and the Royal Belgian Golf Federation (KBGF), the tournament was hosted in the Netherlands 2021 and 2023, and in Belgium 2022 (and had been planned to be again in 2024), following the cancellation of the 2020 event due to the COVID-19 pandemic.

It succeeded the Belgian tournament the KPMG Trophy on the Challenge Tour schedule, and marked the first return of the tour to the Netherlands since the Dutch Futures in 2009.

The tournament was not part of the 2024 Challenge Tour schedule announcement.

== Winners ==
Year	Winner	Score	To par	Margin of victory	Runner(s)-up	Venue
2023	(Sweden) Jesper Svensson	270	−14	1 stroke	(South Africa) Brandon Stone	Twentsche
2022	(Germany) Alexander Knappe	268	−20	1 stroke	(Sweden) Mikael Lindberg	Hulencourt
2021	(Spain) Alfredo García-Heredia	273	−11	Playoff	(Denmark) Marcus Helligkilde (Northern Ireland) Michael Hoey (Iceland) Haraldur Magnús	The Dutch
2020	Cancelled due to COVID-19 pandemic					
