= Aleš Kořínek =

Czech footballer

Personal information
- Date of birth: 9 January 1983 (age 43)
- Place of birth: Czechoslovakia
- Height: 1.89 m (6 ft 2 in)
- Position: Goalkeeper

Senior career*
Years	Team	Apps	(Gls)
2001– 2013	FC Tescoma Zlín	64	(0)
2003	→ HFK Olomouc (loan)		
2004	→ Kroměříž (loan)		
2006	→ Kroměříž (loan)		

International career
1998–1999	Czech Republic U15	3	(0)
1999–2000	Czech Republic U16	3	(0)
2001	Czech Republic U17	2	(0)
2001–2002	Czech Republic U19	4	(0)
2002–2003	Czech Republic U20	3	(0)
2005	Czech Republic U21	1	(0 Golf career
- Nationality: Czech Republic
- Sport: Golf
- Turned professional: 2013
- Current tours: Pro Golf Tour; Czech PGA Tour
- Professional wins: 6
- * Club domestic league appearances and goals

)

Aleš Kořínek (born 9 January 1983) is a Czech professional golfer and former football player. As a footballer, he played as a goalkeeper for several clubs, including FC Tescoma Zlín of the Czech First League, also taking part in the UEFA Intertoto Cup. Kořínek started his golf career after retiring from football in 2013.

== Football career ==
Kořínek represented the Czech Republic at youth groups all the way up to under-21 level. He made his Czech First League debut for Zlín against Příbram on 27 March 2005. In 2006, Kořínek was one of four Zlín players who went out on loan to Slavia Kroměříž for the second half of the 2005–06 Czech 2. Liga.

During his time at Zlín, he celebrated promotion to the Czech First League and played in the UEFA Intertoto Cup. He kept a clean sheet in the 2005 UEFA Intertoto Cup first round match against Belarusian side FC Neman Grodno, which sent his club to the second round. After his contract with Zlín expired at the end of the 2012–13 season, Kořínek left the club and retired from football at the age of 30.

== Golf career ==
After retiring from professional football, Kořínek immediately applied for professional golf status in the Czech Republic. He soon moved up to become one of the top 10 players in Czech Republic. In 2020, Kořínek won on the Pro Golf Tour in Austria and the Grand Final of the Czech PGA Tour. In 2021 he was ranked among the top five Czech players. In August 2022, Kořínek set a new course record at Beroun, finishing his fourth round of the Czech Open in 60 strokes, although he went on to finish second in the tournament behind Julien Brun.

=== Professional wins (6) ===
==== Pro Golf Tour wins (1) ====
No.	Date	Tournament	Winning score	Margin of victory	Runner-up
1	6 Aug 2020	Raiffeisen Pro Golf Tour St. Pölten	−7 (63-70=133) (Note: Shortened to 36 holes due to weather.)	2 strokes	(Switzerland) Marco Iten

==== Czech PGA Tour wins (4) ====
No.	Date	Tournament	Winning score	Margin of victory	Runner(s)-up
1	26 Jul 2016	Ropice Golf Trophy	−9 (69-66=135)	1 stroke	(Czech Republic) Petr Nič
2	9 May 2018	Oaza-Distribuce II Trophy	−6 (66)	2 strokes	(Czech Republic) Ondřej Lieser, (Austria) Fabian Winkler
3	4 Oct 2020	Portiva Golf Trophy	−5 (68-71=139)	3 strokes	(Czech Republic) Filip Ráža
4	23 Jun 2023	Lázně Bohdaneč Open	−7 (65)	3 strokes	(Czech Republic) Jan Hejna, (Czech Republic) Filip Ráža, (Czech Republic) Lukáš Tintěra

==== Other wins (1) ====
No.	Date	Tournament	Winning score	Margin of victory	Runners-up
1	13 Sep 2022	Penati Slovak Open	−7 (69-70=139)	1 stroke	(Czech Republic) Štěpán Daněk, (Czech Republic) Ondřej Lieser
