= Iván Cantero =

Spanish professional golfer (born 1996)

Personal information
- Full name: Iván Cantero Gutiérrez
- Nationality: Spain
- Born: 30 January 1996 (age 30) Madrid, Spain
- Height: 5 ft 7 in (170 cm)

Career
- Sport: Golf
- Turned professional: 2017
- Current tour: European Tour
- Former tour: Challenge Tour
Medal record
Mediterranean Games
Gold medal – first place	2018 Tarragona	Men's team

Iván Cantero Gutiérrez (born 30 January 1996) is a Spanish professional golfer and European Tour player.

== Early life and amateur career ==
Cantero was born in Madrid and grew up in Llanes in northern Spain. He became a member of the Spanish national team at the age of 17, and played in the European Boys' Team Championship twice and the European Amateur Team Championship twice.

He played in the 2014 Summer Youth Olympics alongside Celia Barquín Arozamena. Cantero represented his country at the 2016 Eisenhower Trophy, and Europe at the Jacques Leglise Trophy, Junior Ryder Cup, St Andrews Trophy and the Bonallack Trophy, which he helped win in 2016.

Cantero won the 2016 Internationaux de France - Coupe Murat after a playoff against Marco Penge. He was semi-finalist at the 2015 Spanish Amateur, and quarter-finalist at The Amateur Championship in 2016. He reached number 3 in the World Amateur Golf Ranking.

== Professional career ==
Cantero turned professional in 2017 and joined the European Tour after he was successful at Q-School in 2018. After a season he dropped down to the Challenge Tour, where he tied for 3rd at the 2021 Le Vaudreuil Golf Challenge.

In 2023, he was runner-up at the Abu Dhabi Challenge and the Dormy Open to graduate to the European Tour, where he tied for 4th at the 2024 ISPS Handa Championship in Japan and kept his card. The following year he recorded top-5 finishes at the Ras Al Khaimah Championship and Bapco Energies Bahrain Championship, and finished 77th in the season rankings.

== Amateur wins ==
- 2012 Copa de Invierno FGPA
- 2015 Campeonato Absoluto del Pais Vasco
- 2016 Copa de Andalucia, Campeonato de Barcelona, Internationaux de France – Coupe Murat

== Team appearances ==
Amateur

- Jacques Leglise Trophy (representing the Continent of Europe): 2013
- European Boys' Team Championship (representing Spain): 2013, 2014
- European Nations Cup – Copa Sotogrande (representing Spain): 2014, 2015, 2016
- Summer Youth Olympics (representing Spain): 2014
- Junior Ryder Cup (representing Europe): 2014
- Bonallack Trophy (representing Europe): 2016 (winners)
- St Andrews Trophy (representing the Continent of Europe): 2016
- European Amateur Team Championship (representing Spain): 2015, 2016
- Eisenhower Trophy (representing Spain): 2016

== See also ==
- 2018 European Tour Qualifying School graduates
- 2023 Challenge Tour graduates
- 2026 European Tour Qualifying School graduates
