= Jack Singh Brar =

English professional golfer

Personal information
- Full name: Jackveer Singh Brar
- Nationality: England
- Born: 18 November 1996 (age 29) Southampton, Hampshire, England

Career
- Sport: Golf
- Turned professional: 2017
- Current tour: Challenge Tour
- Former tour: European Tour
- Professional wins: 2

Number of wins by tour
- Challenge Tour: 1
- Other: 1

Jackveer Singh Brar (born 18 November 1996) is an English professional golfer who plays on the European Tour. He won the 2018 Cordon Golf Open. As an amateur, he represented Great Britain and Ireland in the 2017 Walker Cup.

== Amateur career ==
Singh Brar had a successful amateur career, culminating in the 2017 Walker Cup. Although Great Britain and Ireland lost heavily, he won three of his four matches, winning two foursomes matches played with Scott Gregory and the first of his two singles matches.

== Professional career ==
Singh Brar turned professional after the 2017 Walker Cup. He qualified for the 2018 Alps Tour and in February won the Red Sea Little Venice Open in Egypt on his second start, winning by 5 strokes from Bernard Neumayer. In April he made his debut on the Challenge Tour, in the Turkish Airlines Challenge, and was joint runner-up behind Joachim B. Hansen. He had two fourth place finishes on the Challenge Tour before winning the Cordon Golf Open in September, by three strokes from Adri Arnaus. He finished 6th in the Order of Merit to earn a place on the 2019 European Tour.

== Amateur wins ==
- 2012 Faldo Series - Grand Final
- 2013 South England Boys Open
- 2017 Hampshire Salver, Lytham Trophy

== Professional wins (2) ==
=== Challenge Tour wins (1) ===
No.	Date	Tournament	Winning score	Margin of victory	Runner-up
1	2 Sep 2018	Cordon Golf Open	−15 (69-65-64-67=265)	3 strokes	(Spain) Adri Arnaus

=== Alps Tour wins (1) ===
No.	Date	Tournament	Winning score	Margin of victory	Runner-up
1	21 Feb 2018	Red Sea Little Venice Open	−15 (69-65-67=201)	5 strokes	(Austria) Bernard Neumayer

== Team appearances ==
Amateur

- European Boys' Team Championship (representing England): 2013, 2014
- Walker Cup (representing Great Britain & Ireland): 2017

== See also ==
- 2018 Challenge Tour graduates
