= Empordà Challenge =

Golf tournament in Spain

Tournament information
- Location: Girona, Catalonia, Spain
- Established: 2021
- Course: Empordà Golf
- Par: 70
- Length: 6,943 yards (6,349 m)
- Tour: Challenge Tour
- Format: Stroke play
- Prize fund: €250,000
- Month played: June
- Final year: 2022

Tournament record score
- Aggregate: 266 Julien Brun (2021)
- To par: −18 as above

Final champion
- (Scotland) Liam Johnston

Location map
- Location in Catalonia

The Empordà Challenge was a golf tournament on the Challenge Tour held at Empordà Golf on the Costa Brava near Girona, Catalonia, Spain.

In 2021, together with Challenge Costa Brava, also hosted at Empordà Golf, the tournament served as a replacement for the China Swing with Hainan Open and Foshan Open, which was cancelled.

In the inaugural tournament Jonathan Thomson took the early clubhouse lead, after posting a final round of 62 (−9). Jesper Svensson joined Brun at −18, but a bogey-bogey finish sent him to −16, and gave the victory to Julien Brun who held his nerve and finished −18, a stroke ahead of Thomson.

== Winners ==
Year	Winner	Score	To par	Margin of victory	Runner-up
2022	(Scotland) Liam Johnston	267	−13	2 strokes	(England) Todd Clements
2021	(France) Julien Brun	266	−18	1 stroke	(England) Jonathan Thomson
