= Acaya Open =

Double Tree by Hilton Acaya Open
Tournament information
- Location: Lecce, Italy
- Established: 2011
- Course: Acaya Golf Resort
- Par: 70
- Length: 6,856 yards (6,269 m)
- Tour: Challenge Tour
- Format: Stroke play
- Prize fund: €160,000
- Month played: July
- Final year: 2012

Tournament record score
- Aggregate: 271 Espen Kofstad (2012)
- To par: −9 as above

Final champion
- (Norway) Espen Kofstad
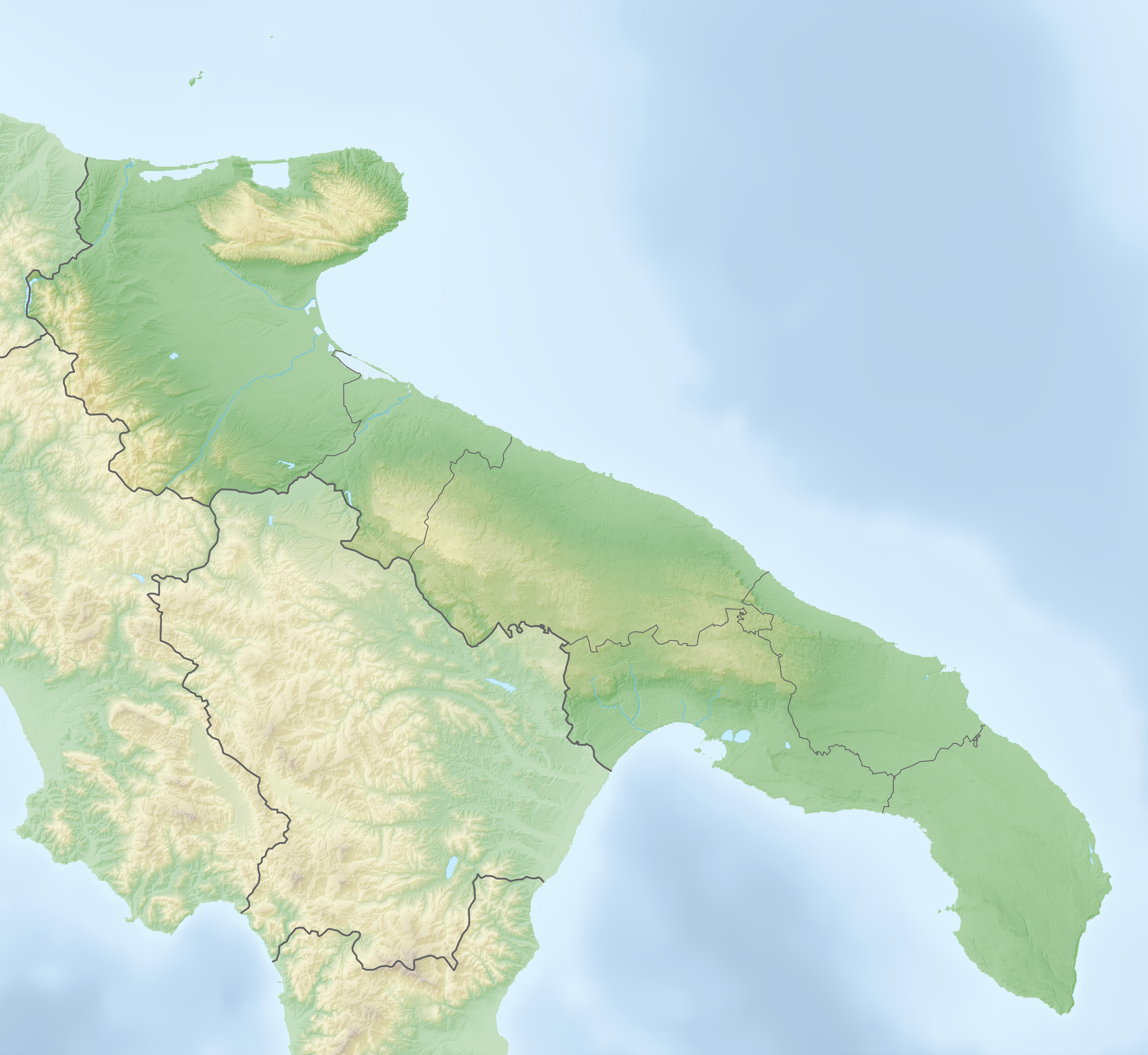
- Location in Italy Location in Apulia

The Acaya Open was a golf tournament on the Challenge Tour, played at the Acaya Golf Resort in Italy. It was first held in 2011, when Jamie Moul won the tournament. Espen Kofstad of Norway won the second and final event in 2012.

== Winners ==
| Year | Winner | Score | To par | Margin of victory | Runner(s)-up |
Double Tree by Hilton Acaya Open
| 2012 | (Norway) Espen Kofstad | 271 | −9 | 1 stroke | (Denmark) Joachim B. Hansen |
Acaya Open
| 2011 | (England) Jamie Moul | 272 | −8 | 1 stroke | (Spain) Jorge Campillo (South Africa) Branden Grace |
