= 2019 Alps Tour =

Golf tour season

2019 Alps Tour season
- Duration: 19 February 2019 – 26 October 2019
- Number of official events: 15
- Most wins: (France) Frédéric Lacroix (3)
- Order of Merit: (Italy) Edoardo Lipparelli

The 2019 Alps Tour was the 19th season of the Alps Tour, a third-tier golf tour recognised by the European Tour.

== Schedule ==
The following table lists official events during the 2019 season.

Date	Tournament	Host country	Purse (€)	Winner (Note: The number in brackets after each winner's name is the number of Alps Tour events they had won up to and including that tournament. It is rare for someone to accumulate many wins on the Alps Tour as success at this level usually leads to promotion to the Challenge Tour.)	OWGR points	Other tours (Note: LETAS − LET Access Series.)
21 Feb	Ein Bay Open	Egypt	40,000	(France) Frédéric Lacroix (1)	4	
27 Feb	Red Sea Little Venice Open	Egypt	40,000	(England) Benjamin Wheeler (1)	4	
27 Mar	Dreamland Pyramids Open	Egypt	40,000	(Austria) Lukas Nemecz (2)	4	
1 Apr	New Giza Open	Egypt	40,000	(Italy) Lorenzo Scalise (1)	4	
6 Apr	Katameya Dunes Open	Egypt	40,000	(Italy) Luca Cianchetti (2)	4	
19 Apr	Abruzzo Open Dailies Total 1	Italy	40,000	(Spain) Sebastián García Rodríguez (2)	4	
11 May	Alps de Las Castillas	Spain	48,000	(France) Frédéric Lacroix (2)	4	
18 May	Gösser Open	Austria	42,500	(Austria) Timon Baltl (1)	4	
24 May	Memorial Giorgio Bordoni	Italy	40,000	(Spain) Sebastián García Rodríguez (3)	4	
8 Jun	Open de Saint François Region Guadeloupe	Guadeloupe	43,000	(Italy) Edoardo Lipparelli (1)	4	
15 Jun	Acaya Open Dailies Total 1	Italy	40,000	(Italy) Gregory Molteni (1)	4	
23 Jun	Open de la Mirabelle d'Or	France	43,000	(Netherlands) Lars van Meijel (2)	4	
7 Jul	Saint-Malo Golf Mixed Open	France	45,000	(France) Frédéric Lacroix (3)	6	LETAS (Note: Mixed event)
13 Jul	Fred Olsen Alps de La Gomera	Spain	40,000	(Spain) Gonzalo Vicente Elena (1)	4	
27 Jul	Nazionale Open	Italy	40,000	(Italy) Enrico Di Nitto (2)	4	
7 Sep	Cervino Open	Italy	40,000	(Republic of Ireland) David Carey (1)	4	
26 Oct	Alps Tour Grand Final	Italy	40,000	(Italy) Federico Maccario (3)	6	

== Order of Merit ==
The Order of Merit was based on tournament results during the season, calculated using a points-based system. The top five players on the Order of Merit (not otherwise exempt) earned status to play on the 2020 Challenge Tour.

Position	Player	Points	Status earned
1	(Italy) Edoardo Lipparelli	36,667	Promoted to Challenge Tour
2	(Italy) Enrico Di Nitto	29,638	Promoted to Challenge Tour
3	(France) Frédéric Lacroix	29,515	Promoted to Challenge Tour
4	(Italy) Federico Maccario	27,777	Promoted to Challenge Tour
5	(Spain) Sebastián García Rodríguez	24,818	Promoted to European Tour (Top 15 of Challenge Tour Rankings)
6	(Austria) Timon Baltl	21,853	Promoted to Challenge Tour
7	(France) Xavier Poncelet	18,333	
8	(France) Julien Forêt	17,882	
9	(Austria) Lukas Nemecz	17,202	
10	(Netherlands) Lars van Meijel	15,686	Qualified for European Tour (Top 25 in Q School)
