= Jamie Moul =

English professional golfer

Personal information
- Nationality: England
- Born: 26 September 1984 (age 42) Chelmsford, England
- Height: 1.83 m (6 ft 0 in)

Career
- Sport: Golf
- Turned professional: 2007
- Former tours: European Tour; Challenge Tour
- Professional wins: 2

Number of wins by tour
- Challenge Tour: 1
- Other: 1

Jamie Moul (born 26 September 1984) is an English professional golfer who became the third man to top the World Amateur Golf Ranking on 13 February 2007.

== Career ==
In 1984, Moul plays out of Stoke-by-Nayland Golf Club near Colchester in Essex. His tournament wins include the 2006 Lytham Trophy and the 2007 Brabazon Trophy (jointly with Romain Bechu).

Moul played on the Great Britain and Ireland team in the 2007 Walker Cup. He played in all four rounds. On the Saturday, he halved the foursomes with his partner Daniel Willett, and won his singles by 1 hole against opponent, Chris Kirk. On Sunday, Moul lost twice, again playing with Daniel Willett in the morning foursomes, and losing to Jamie Lovemark in the afternoon singles. Great Britain & Ireland lost to the United States 12.5 to 11.5.

Moul turned professional after the 2007 Walker Cup.

In 2011, Moul won his first Challenge Tour event at the inaugural Acaya Open in Italy.

Moul is coached by Ipswich-based professional Kevin Lovelock.

== Amateur wins ==
- 2006 Lytham Trophy
- 2007 Brabazon Trophy (tie with Romain Bechu)

== Professional wins (2) ==
=== Challenge Tour wins (1) ===
No.	Date	Tournament	Winning score	Margin of victory	Runners-up
1	10 Jul 2011	Acaya Open	−8 (65-71-71-65=272)	1 stroke	(Spain) Jorge Campillo, (South Africa) Branden Grace

=== Jamega Pro Golf Tour wins (1) ===
No.	Date	Tournament	Winning score	Margin of victory	Runner-up
1	20 Apr 2016	Dummer	−11 (66-67=133)	1 stroke	(England) Craig Hinton

== Team appearances ==
Amateur

- European Boys' Team Championship (representing England): 2002
- Jacques Léglise Trophy (representing Great Britain and Ireland): 2002 (winners)
- European Youths' Team Championship (representing England): 2004
- European Amateur Team Championship (representing England): 2005 (winners), 2007
- Eisenhower Trophy (representing England): 2006
- St Andrews Trophy (representing Great Britain & Ireland): 2006 (winners)
- Walker Cup (representing Great Britain & Ireland): 2007

== See also ==
- 2011 Challenge Tour graduates
