= 2023 Challenge Tour graduates =

This is a list of players who graduated from the Challenge Tour in 2023.

As Alex Fitzpatrick, eleventh in the Challenge Tour rankings in 2023, had already earned his 2024 European Tour through his 2023 DP World Tour Rankings, the 21st player also earned a card.

| | | 2023 Challenge Tour | | 2024 European Tour | | | | |
| Player | | Points rank | Points | Starts | Cuts made | Best finish | Points rank | Earnings (€) |
|---|---|---|---|---|---|---|---|---|
| (England) | Marco Penge* | 1 | 1,285 | 29 | 10 | T4 | 110 | 310,887 |
| (South Africa) | Casey Jarvis* | 2 | 1,278 | 34 | 24 | T6 | 63 | 585,954 |
| (Spain) | Manuel Elvira* | 3 | 1,262 | 30 | 16 | T4 | 102 | 353,747 |
| (France) | Ugo Coussaud* | 4 | 1,240 | 29 | 21 | 2 | 33 | 1,069,153 |
| (Sweden) | Jesper Svensson* | 5 | 1,221 | 28 | 21 | Win | 10 | 1,664,246 |
| (Sweden) | Adam Blommé* | 6 | 1,199 | 12 | 3 | T54 | 232 | 14,367 |
| (Italy) | Lorenzo Scalise^{†} | 7 | 1,180 | 31 | 13 | T11 | 163 | 137,389 |
| (Italy) | Andrea Pavan | 8 | 1,140 | 32 | 18 | T4 | 79 | 501,424 |
| (Italy) | Matteo Manassero | 9 | 1,127 | 30 | 20 | Win | 12 | 1,676,787 |
| (Portugal) | Ricardo Gouveia | 10 | 1,028 | 29 | 12 | 3 | 100 | 382,442 |
| (France) | Tom Vaillant* | 12 | 974 | 26 | 15 | T7 (x2) | 90 | 414,837 |
| (France) | Frédéric Lacroix | 13 | 924 | 24 | 16 | Win | 29 | 1,082,152 |
| (Italy) | Francesco Laporta | 14 | 913 | 31 | 24 | T6 (x2) | 52 | 666,451 |
| (England) | Will Enefer* | 15 | 903 | 28 | 10 | T17 | 165 | 140,864 |
| (Spain) | Iván Cantero | 16 | 901 | 30 | 9 | T3 | 99 | 353,048 |
| (Switzerland) | Joel Girrbach^{†} | 17 | 877 | 29 | 13 | T3 | 109 | 330,053 |
| (England) | Sam Bairstow* | 18 | 869 | 31 | 21 | T2 | 36 | 971,225 |
| (South Africa) | Brandon Stone | 19 | 857 | 28 | 16 | T4 | 57 | 669,695 |
| (Germany) | Max Rottluff* | 20 | 852 | 27 | 13 | T9 | 125 | 290,937 |
| (Wales) | Stuart Manley | 21 | 841 | 25 | 5 | T22 | 192 | 56,045 |

*European Tour rookie in 2024
^{†}First-time full member, but ineligible for Rookie of the Year award
The player retained his European Tour card for 2025 (finished inside the top 114).
The player did not retain his European Tour card for 2025, but retained conditional status (finished between 115 and 151, inclusive).
The player did not retain his European Tour card for 2025 (finished outside the top 154).

== Wins on the European Tour in 2024 ==
| No. | Date | Player | Tournament | Winning score | Margin of victory | Runner(s)-up |
|---|---|---|---|---|---|---|
| 1 | 10 Mar | (Italy) Matteo Manassero | Jonsson Workwear Open | −26 (68-61-67-66=262) | 3 strokes | (South Africa) Thriston Lawrence (South Africa) Shaun Norris (England) Jordan Smith |
| 2 | 24 Mar | (Sweden) Jesper Svensson | Porsche Singapore Classic | −17 (68-73-67-63=271) | Playoff | (Thailand) Kiradech Aphibarnrat |
| 3 | 25 Aug | (France) Frédéric Lacroix | Danish Golf Championship | −14 (67-71-67-65=270) | 4 strokes | (Denmark) Lucas Bjerregaard (France) Romain Langasque |

== Runner-up finishes on the European Tour in 2024 ==
| No. | Date | Player | Tournament | Winner | Winning score | Runner-up score |
|---|---|---|---|---|---|---|
| 1 | 3 Dec 2023 | (Sweden) Jesper Svensson | Investec South African Open Championship | (South Africa) Dean Burmester | −11 (70-74-65-68=277) | −8 (68-67-74-71=280) |
| 2 | 4 Feb 2024 | (Sweden) Jesper Svensson (2) | Bahrain Championship | (South Africa) Dylan Frittelli | −13 (67-68-69-71=275) | −11 (70-65-72-70=277) |
| 3 | 11 Feb | (France) Ugo Coussaud | Commercial Bank Qatar Masters | (Japan) Rikuya Hoshino | −14 (69-68-69-68=274) | −13 (71-68-67-69=275) |
| 4 | 13 Oct | (England) Sam Bairstow | Open de France | (England) Dan Bradbury | −16 (67-66-69-66=268) | −15 (71-65-65-68=269) |

== See also ==
- 2023 European Tour Qualifying School graduates
