= 2018 Pro Golf Tour =

Golf tour season

2018 Pro Golf Tour season
- Duration: 15 January 2018 – 25 September 2018
- Number of official events: 20 (Note: One further tournament was scheduled but was cancelled.)
- Most wins: (France) Mathieu Decottignies-Lafon (2)
- Order of Merit: (Scotland) Craig Howie

The 2018 Pro Golf Tour was the 22nd season of the Pro Golf Tour (formerly the EPD Tour), a third-tier tour recognised by the European Tour.

== Schedule ==
The following table lists official events during the 2018 season.

Date	Tournament	Host country	Purse (€)	Winner (Note: The number in brackets after each winner's name is the number of Pro Golf Tour events they had won up to and including that tournament. It is rare for someone to accumulate many wins on the Pro Golf Tour as success at this level usually leads to promotion to the Challenge Tour.)	OWGR points
17 Jan	Red Sea Egyptian Classic	Egypt	30,000	(Germany) Michael Hirmer (a) (1)	4
23 Jan	Red Sea Ain Sokhna Classic	Egypt	30,000	(Germany) Jeremy Paul (1)	4
5 Feb	Open Prestigia	Morocco	30,000	(Scotland) Liam Johnston (1)	4
9 Feb	Open Casa Green Golf	Morocco	30,000	(France) Julien de Poyen (1)	4
26 Feb	Open Madaef	Morocco	30,000	(Netherlands) Robbie van West (2)	4
~~2 Mar~~	Open Palmeraie Country Club	Morocco	–	Cancelled	–
26 Mar	Open Ocean	Morocco	30,000	(Switzerland) Benjamin Rusch (4)	4
30 Mar	Open Tazegzout	Morocco	30,000	(France) Romain Bechu (2)	4
5 Apr	Open Royal Golf Anfa Mohammedia	Morocco	30,000	(Germany) Max Kramer (9)	4
26 Apr	Haugschlag NÖ Open	Austria	30,000	(France) Mathieu Decottignies-Lafon (3)	4
12 May	EXTEC Trophy	Czech Republic	30,000	(France) Richard Jouven (1)	4
31 May	Raiffeisen Pro Golf Tour St. Pölten	Austria	30,000	(Germany) Allen John (a) (2)	4
18 Jun	McNeill Open	Germany	30,000	(Germany) Hinrich Arkenau (4)	4
26 Jun	Polish Open	Poland	30,000	(France) Mathieu Decottignies-Lafon (4)	4
6 Jul	Broekpolder International Open	Netherlands	30,000	(France) Nicolas Maheut (1)	4
13 Jul	Gut Bissenmoor Classic	Germany	30,000	(Germany) Maximilian Laier (2)	4
20 Jul	Zell am See – Kaprun Open	Austria	30,000	(Czech Republic) Ondřej Lieser (1)	4
7 Aug	Leipziger Golf Open	Germany	30,000	(Scotland) Craig Howie (1)	4
17 Aug	Starnberg Open	Germany	30,000	(Germany) Daniel Wünsche (6)	4
5 Sep	New Golf Club Matchplay Championship	Germany	30,000	(Poland) Mateusz Gradecki (1)	4
25 Sep	Castanea Resort Championship	Germany	50,000	(Germany) Jonas Kölbing (1)	4

== Order of Merit ==
The Order of Merit was based on tournament results during the season, calculated using a points-based system. The top five players on the Order of Merit earned status to play on the 2019 Challenge Tour.

Position	Player	Points	Status earned
1	(Scotland) Craig Howie	23,481	Promoted to Challenge Tour
2	(Germany) Jonas Kölbing	22,236	Promoted to Challenge Tour
3	(France) Mathieu Decottignies-Lafon	20,816	Promoted to Challenge Tour
4	(Scotland) Chris Robb	18,942	Promoted to Challenge Tour
5	(Poland) Mateusz Gradecki	18,369	Promoted to Challenge Tour
6	(Switzerland) Benjamin Rusch	17,816	
7	(Germany) Hinrich Arkenau	17,028	
8	(Czech Republic) Ondřej Lieser	15,719	
9	(France) Julien de Poyen	14,649	
10	(Scotland) Chris Maclean	12,667	
