= Sydbank Esbjerg Challenge =

Tournament information
- Location: Esbjerg, Denmark
- Established: 2021
- Course: Esbjerg Golfklub
- Par: 71
- Length: 6,953 yards (6,358 m)
- Tours: Challenge Tour; Nordic Golf League
- Format: Stroke play
- Prize fund: €200,000
- Month played: August
- Final year: 2021

Tournament record score
- Aggregate: 273 Ewen Ferguson (2021); 273 Espen Kofstad (2021)
- To par: −11 as above

Final champion
- (Norway) Espen Kofstad

Location map
- Location in Denmark

The Sydbank Esbjerg Challenge was a golf tournament on the Challenge Tour held at Esbjerg Golf Club, Esbjerg, Denmark.

The inaugural tournament in 2021 was the second of the Challenge Tour's Danish Swing in August, following the Made in Esbjerg Challenge, both co-sanctioned by the Nordic Golf League.

Norway's Espen Kofstad shot a final round of 67 to join Ewen Ferguson on −11 after the Scot shot a final round 69. Kofstad won the sudden death playoff as he birdied the first extra hole to claim his first win in five years.

== Winners ==
Year	Tours (Note: CHA − Challenge Tour; NGL − Nordic Golf League.)	Winner	Score	To par	Margin of victory	Runner-up
2021	CHA, NGL	(Norway) Espen Kofstad	273	−11	Playoff	(Scotland) Ewen Ferguson
