= Frédéric Lacroix =

French professional golfer (born 1995)

Personal information
- Nationality: France
- Born: 23 February 1995 (age 31) Paris, France
- Height: 6 ft 2 in (1.88 m)
- Weight: 189 lb (86 kg; 13.5 st)

Career
- Sport: Golf
- College: University of Mannheim; Paris Dauphine University
- Turned professional: 2019
- Current tour: European Tour
- Former tours: Challenge Tour; Alps Tour
- Professional wins: 4

Number of wins by tour
- European Tour: 1
- Other: 3

Best results in major championships
- Masters Tournament: DNP
- PGA Championship: DNP
- U.S. Open: CUT: 2025
- The Open Championship: CUT: 2026

Frédéric Lacroix (born 23 February 1995) is a French professional golfer and European Tour player.

== Early life and amateur career ==
Lacroix was born in Paris and took up golf at age 8 playing at the Fourqueux golf course, after his family moved to Saint-Germain-en-Laye. At the end of 2013, Lacroix enrolled at the University of Mannheim in Germany, where he trained at Golf Club St. Leon-Rot for two and a half years. In 2016, he enrolled at Paris Dauphine University where he graduated in December 2018 with a degree in management.

Lacroix enjoyed a successful amateur career. He represented France at the European Amateur Team Championship and Eisenhower Trophy. He also represented Europe at the St Andrews Trophy and Bonallack Trophy. Individually, he won a number of Grand Prix around France, including Championnat de France – Coupe Ganay twice. He played well in South Africa and finished 3rd at the 2017 South African Stroke Play Championship and 4th at the 2018 African Amateur Stroke Play Championship.

== Professional career ==
Lacroix turned professional in 2019 after finishing his studies. He joined the Alps Tour where he won three times in 2019 to earn "battlefield promotion" to the Challenge Tour. He won the Ein Bay Open in Egypt at 15-under, and the Alps de Las Castillas in Spain at 28 under par. He made golfing history with his win, ahead of Manon De Roey in third, at the Saint-Malo Golf Mixed Open the first full-field mixed professional golf tournament in Europe, co-sanctioned by the LET Access Series.

On the 2021 Challenge Tour, he finished runner-up at the Challenge de España, Open de Portugal and Rolex Challenge Tour Grand Final, to finish 5th in the Order of Merit and earn promotion to the European Tour. He missed just four cuts in 19 starts.

In 2022, his rookie season on the European Tour, his best finishes were a tie for fifth at the Joburg Open and a tie for 10th at the BMW International Open. He rose to a high of 215th on the Official World Golf Ranking and finished 121st in the Order of Merit, narrowly missing out on keeping his full card.

In 2023, he finished 5th at the Porsche European Open in Germany and tied for 10th amongst the men at the Volvo Car Scandinavian Mixed after starting the tournament only one stroke off the lead after the first round.

== Amateur wins ==
- 2013 Championnat de France – Coupe Ganay
- 2015 Grand Prix Du Prieure
- 2016 Coupe Didier Illouz, Grand Prix de Saint Nom la Breteche, Grand Prix de Saint-Germain
- 2017 Championnat de France – Coupe Ganay, European Men's Club Trophy (Individual)

== Professional wins (4) ==
=== European Tour wins (1) ===
| No. | Date | Tournament | Winning score | Margin of victory | Runners-up |
|---|---|---|---|---|---|
| 1 | 25 Aug 2024 | Danish Golf Championship | −14 (67-71-67-65=270) | 4 strokes | (Denmark) Lucas Bjerregaard, (France) Romain Langasque |

=== Alps Tour wins (3) ===
| No. | Date | Tournament | Winning score | Margin of victory | Runner(s)-up |
|---|---|---|---|---|---|
| 1 | 21 Feb 2019 | Ein Bay Open | −15 (66-67-68=201) | 4 strokes | (Spain) Manuel Elvira, (Republic of Ireland) Jonathan Yates |
| 2 | 11 May 2019 | Alps de Las Castillas | −28 (63-62-63=188) | 4 strokes | (Spain) Sebastián García Rodríguez |
| 3 | 7 Jul 2019 | Saint-Malo Golf Mixed Open^{1} | −22 (66-68-65-67=266) | 2 strokes | (Italy) Enrico Di Nitto |

^{1}Mixed event with the LET Access Series

== Results in major championships ==
| Tournament | 2025 | 2026 |
|---|---|---|
| Masters Tournament | | |
| PGA Championship | | |
| U.S. Open | CUT | |
| The Open Championship | | CUT |

Did not play

CUT = missed the halfway cut

== Team appearances ==
Amateur

- Summer Universiade (representing France): 2017
- European Amateur Team Championship (representing France): 2017, 2018
- St Andrews Trophy (representing the continent of Europe): 2018 (winners)
- Bonallack Trophy (representing Europe): 2018
- Eisenhower Trophy (representing France): 2018

== See also ==
- 2021 Challenge Tour graduates
- 2023 Challenge Tour graduates
