= Santiago Tarrío =

Spanish professional golfer

Personal information
- Full name: Santiago Tarrío Ben
- Nationality: Spain
- Born: 7 November 1990 (age 35) Touro, A Coruña, Spain

Career
- Sport: Golf
- Turned professional: 2007
- Current tour: European Tour
- Former tours: Challenge Tour; Alps Tour
- Professional wins: 4
- Highest ranking: 87 (26 September 2021) (as of 25 October 2026)

Number of wins by tour
- Challenge Tour: 2
- Other: 2

Achievements and awards
- Alps Tour Order of Merit winner: 2018

Santiago Tarrío Ben (born 21 November 1990) is a Spanish professional golfer who currently plays on the Challenge Tour where has won twice.

== Amateur career ==
Tarrío started playing golf at the age of 7 and turned professional at the age of 17.

== Professional career ==
Tarrío did not start competing internationally until 2016. He had played two events in Spain on the 2015 Alps Tour, missing the cut on each occasion. However he finished 4th at the Alps Tour Qualifying School at the end of 2015, to gain a regular place on the tour for 2016. Tarrío was runner-up in the 72-hole Alps Costa del Sol, three strokes behind Tom Shadbolt, and finished the season 26th on the Order of Merit. He was 19th on the 2017 Order of Merit, finishing a stroke behind James Sharp at the Cervino Open. Tarrío won three events in 2016 and 2017 on the domestic Gambito Tour.

2018 was a break-through year for Tarrío. He won two events on the Alps Tour, the Gösser Open and the 72-hole Open International de la Mirabelle d'Or, was joint runner-up twice and led the Order of Merit, to gain a place on the Challenge Tour for 2019.

Tarrío played on the 2019 Challenge Tour. His best finish was a tied for 4th place at the Open de Bretagne and he finished the season 63rd on the Order of Merit. On the shorterned 2020 Challenge Tour, Tarrío had a fourth-place finish at the Dimension Data Pro-Am in South Africa and finished the season with a runner-up finish at the Challenge Tour Grand Final, ending the season 7th on the Order of Merit.

Tarrío won his first Challenge Tour event in June 2021, winning a three-man playoff for the D+D Real Czech Challenge. The following week he was third at the Challenge de Cádiz and his second win a week later at the Challenge de España. In August 2021 he finished solo third at the Hero Open, a European Tour event, after birdies at two of the last three holes.

== Professional wins (4) ==
=== Challenge Tour wins (2) ===
No.	Date	Tournament	Winning score	Margin of victory	Runners-up
1	6 Jun 2021	D+D Real Czech Challenge	−17 (67-72-68-64=271)	Playoff	(France) Julien Brun, (Norway) Kristian Krogh Johannessen
2	18 Jun 2021	Challenge de España	−20 (71-64-67-66=268)	1 stroke	(Scotland) Ewen Ferguson, (France) Frédéric Lacroix, (Australia) Blake Windred

Challenge Tour playoff record (1–1)

No.	Year	Tournament	Opponent(s)	Result
1	2021	D+D Real Czech Challenge	(France) Julien Brun, (Norway) Kristian Krogh Johannessen	Won with birdie on fourth extra hole
2	2025	Swiss Challenge	(France) Félix Mory	Lost to birdie on first extra hole

=== Alps Tour wins (2) ===
No.	Date	Tournament	Winning score	Margin of victory	Runner(s)-up
1	26 May 2018	Gösser Open	−13 (67-68-68=203)	3 strokes	(France) Louis Cohen Boyer, (Belgium) Kevin Hesbois, (Austria) Lukas Nemecz
2	24 Jun 2018	Open International de la Mirabelle d'Or	−16 (64-68-71-65=268)	5 strokes	(France) Teremoana Beaucousin

== Team appearances ==
- European Championships (representing Spain): 2018

== See also ==
- 2021 Challenge Tour graduates
