= Julien Brun =

French professional golfer (born 1992)

Personal information
- Nationality: France
- Born: 1 April 1992 (age 34) Cagnes-sur-Mer, France
- Height: 6 ft 2 in (1.88 m)
- Weight: 189 lb (86 kg; 13.5 st)

Career
- Sport: Golf
- College: Texas Christian University
- Turned professional: 2015
- Current tour: European Tour
- Former tours: Challenge Tour; PGA Tour Canada; Alps Tour; Pro Golf Tour; Czech PGA Tour
- Professional wins: 8

Number of wins by tour
- Challenge Tour: 3
- Other: 5

Julien Brun (born 1 April 1992) is a French professional golfer. He has won three times on the Challenge Tour, firstly in 2012 as an amateur, before winning again at the Open de Bretagne and the Empordà Challenge in 2021.

== Amateur career ==
Brun played college golf at Texas Christian University. In his freshman year (2011–12), he won three events. He also won the opening tournament of the 2012–13 season.

In September 2012, Brun won the Allianz Golf Open Toulouse Metropole on the Challenge Tour. He was the sixth amateur to win in Challenge Tour history.

In 2015, Brun medaled at one of the qualifying school events for the PGA Tour Canada.

== Professional career ==
Brun turned professional in mid-2015 after graduating from university. He played on the Canadian tour for two season, 2015 and 2016 but had little success. He played a number of events on the 2017 Alps Tour, winning the Ein Bay Open in Egypt, the opening event of the season. Brun played primarily on the Challenge Tour in 2017, 2018 and 2019.

In 2020 Brun played on the Pro Golf Tour, winning twice, at the Open Casa Green Golf in February and the Gradi Polish Open in July. He was also twice runner-up during the season and finished second in the Order of Merit to gain a place on the Challenge Tour for 2021. In June 2021, Brun lost a playoff for the D+D Real Czech Challenge. Tied with Kristian Krogh Johannessen and Santiago Tarrío after 72 holes, the playoff went to the fourth extra hole before Tarrio won with a birdie 3. Three weeks later he won the Open de Bretagne, his first on the Challenge Tour as a professional, two ahead of Chase Hanna and Jérôme Lando-Casanova.

== Professional wins (8) ==
=== Challenge Tour wins (3) ===
No.	Date	Tournament	Winning score	Margin of victory	Runner(s)-up
1	23 Sep 2012	Allianz Golf Open Toulouse Metropole (as an amateur)	−13 (67-67-67-70=271)	1 stroke	(Italy) Matteo Delpodio
2	27 Jun 2021	Open de Bretagne	−13 (64-68-66-69=267)	2 strokes	(United States) Chase Hanna, (France) Jérôme Lando-Casanova
3	17 Oct 2021	Empordà Challenge	−18 (65-65-67-69=266)	1 stroke	(England) Jonathan Thomson

Challenge Tour playoff record (0–1)

No.	Year	Tournament	Opponents	Result
1	2021	D+D Real Czech Challenge	(Norway) Kristian Krogh Johannessen, (Spain) Santiago Tarrío	Tarrío won with birdie on fourth extra hole

=== Alps Tour wins (1) ===
No.	Date	Tournament	Winning score	Margin of victory	Runners-up
1	16 Feb 2017	Ein Bay Open	−13 (64-70-69=203)	1 stroke	(France) Alexandre Daydou, (France) Xavier Poncelet

=== Pro Golf Tour wins (2) ===
No.	Date	Tournament	Winning score	Margin of victory	Runner-up
1	19 Feb 2020	Open Casa Green Golf	−14 (63-70-68=201)	2 strokes	(England) James Wilson
2	31 Jul 2020	Gradi Polish Open	−18 (61-66-65=192)	2 strokes	(Switzerland) Jeremy Freiburghaus

=== Czech PGA Tour wins (2) ===
No.	Date	Tournament	Winning score	Margin of victory	Runner(s)-up
1	17 Jun 2020	Czech Classic Open	−4 (68)	Playoff	(Czech Republic) Aleš Kořínek, (Czech Republic) Stanislav Matuš
2	14 Aug 2022	Czech Open	−23 (65-67-68-65=265)	Playoff	(Czech Republic) Aleš Kořínek

== Team appearances ==
Amateur

- European Boys' Team Championship (representing France): 2008, 2009, 2010
- Junior Ryder Cup (representing Europe): 2008
- Eisenhower Trophy (representing France): 2012
- Palmer Cup (representing Europe): 2012 (winners), 2013
- European Amateur Team Championship (representing France): 2011 (winners), 2013, 2014

== See also ==
- 2021 Challenge Tour graduates
