= 2016 Eisenhower Trophy =

Tournament information
- Dates: 21–24 September
- Location: Playa del Carmen, Quintana Roo, Riviera Maya, Mexico; 20.6895°N 87.0312°W
- Courses: Mayakoba El Camaleón Golf Club; Iberostar Playa Paraiso Golf Club
- Format: 72 holes stroke play

Statistics
- Par: 71 (Mayakoba); 72 (Iberostar)
- Field: 71 teams 212 players

Champion
- Australia; Cameron Davis, Harrison Endycott & Curtis Luck
- 534 (−38)

Location map
- Location in Mexico Location in Quintana Roo

The 2016 Eisenhower Trophy took place 21–24 September at the Mayakoba El Camaleón Golf Club and the Iberostar Playa Paraiso Golf Club on the Riviera Maya, south of Cancun, Mexico. It was the 30th World Amateur Team Championship for the Eisenhower Trophy and the second to be held in Mexico.

== Format ==
The tournament was a 72-hole stroke play team event with 72 three-man teams. The best two scores for each round counted towards the team total. Each team played two rounds on the two courses. The leading teams played at the Iberostar Playa Paraiso Golf Club on the third day and at the Mayakoba El Camaleón Golf Club on the final day.

== Winners ==
Australia won their third Eisenhower Trophy, 19 strokes ahead of England, who took the silver medal. Austria and Ireland tied for third place and received bronze medals. Cameron Davis had the best 72-hole aggregate of 269, two better than fellow-Australian Curtis Luck.

The 2016 Espirito Santo Trophy was played on the same courses one week prior.

== Teams ==
71 teams contested the event. Each team had three players with the exception of Armenia who were represented by only two players.

The following table lists the players on the leading teams.

Country	Players
Australia	Cameron Davis, Harrison Endycott, Curtis Luck
Austria	Michael Ludwig, Markus Maukner, Matthias Schwab
Canada	Hugo Bernard, Jared du Toit, Garrett Rank
Colombia	Nico Echavarría, Mateo Gomez Villegas, Santiago Gómez
Denmark	John Axelsen, Peter Launer Bæk, Marcus Helligkilde
England	Jamie Bower, Scott Gregory, Alfie Plant
France	Ugo Coussaud, Jérémy Gandon, Antoine Rozner
Germany	Hurly Long, Jeremy Paul, Max Schmitt
Ireland	Stuart Grehan, Jack Hume, Paul McBride
Mexico	Isidro Benítez, Luis Gerardo Garza, Álvaro Ortiz
New Zealand	Ryan Chisnall, Luke Toomey, Nick Voke
Norway	Viktor Hovland, Knud Krokeide, Kristoffer Ventura
Poland	Jakub Dymecki, Mateusz Gradecki, Adrian Meronk
Scotland	Grant Forrest, Robert MacIntyre, Connor Syme
South Korea	Jang Seung-bo, Ryu Je-chang, Yun Sung-ho
Spain	Iván Cantero, Manuel Elvira, Mario Galiano
Sweden	Fredrik Niléhn, Robin Petersson, Hannes Rönneblad
Thailand	Witchayanon Chothirunrungrueng, Kosuke Hamamoto, Sadom Kaewkanjana
United States	Brad Dalke, Maverick McNealy, Scottie Scheffler
Venezuela	Jorge García, Manuel Torres, George Trujillo
Wales	David Boote, Josh Davies, Owen Edwards

== Results ==
Place	Country	Score	To par
1st place, gold medalist(s)	Australia	135-132-131-136=534	−38
2nd place, silver medalist(s)	England	139-141-137-136=553	−19
3rd place, bronze medalist(s)	Austria	139-140-138-137=554	−18
3rd place, bronze medalist(s)	Ireland	136-143-135-140=554	−18
5	Norway	141-139-139-136=555	−17
T6	New Zealand	143-138-138-138=557	−15
T6	United States	137-138-140-142=557	−15
8	Poland	138-139-140-141=558	−14
T9	Canada	144-140-136-140=560	−12
T9	Spain	136-145-138-141=560	−12
11	Scotland	134-144-143-140=561	−11
12	Germany	147-137-140-138=562	−10
T13	South Korea	145-139-141-138=563	−9
T13	Sweden	139-142-142-140=563	−9
T13	Venezuela	143-143-141-136=563	−9
T16	France	139-142-142-141=564	−8
T16	Mexico	141-140-141-142=564	−8
T16	Thailand	138-143-138-145=564	−8
T16	Wales	144-143-140-137=564	−8
T20	Colombia	142-138-145-141=566	−6
T20	Denmark	143-139-140-144=566	−6
22	Singapore	146-135-147-140=568	−4
23	Japan	139-144-141-145=569	−3
24	Iceland	141-142-143-144=570	−2
25	Argentina	142-142-139-148=571	−1
T26	Chinese Taipei	140-140-147-147=574	+2
T26	Peru	142-142-142-148=574	+2
28	Netherlands	145-138-144-148=575	+3
T29	Finland	141-151-145-140=577	+5
T29	Switzerland	140-144-146-147=577	+5
T31	Chile	149-146-139-145=579	+7
T31	India	147-144-146-142=579	+7
T31	South Africa	141-144-148-146=579	+7
T34	Brazil	143-142-148-148=581	+9
T34	Italy	141-145-150-145=581	+9
T34	Morocco	140-148-145-148=581	+9
T34	Zimbabwe	144-148-146-143=581	+9
38	Uruguay	145-152-141-145=583	+11
T39	Ecuador	150-149-143-143=585	+13
T39	Portugal	140-144-158-143=585	+13
T41	China	146-147-148-146=587	+15
T41	Dominican Republic	139-155-145-148=587	+15
43	Hong Kong	148-144-142-154=588	+16
T44	Czech Republic	142-152-147-148=589	+17
T44	Puerto Rico	146-148-148-147=589	+17
T46	Guam	146-152-145-149=592	+20
T46	Guatemala	146-145-146-155=592	+20
48	Slovakia	147-149-148-154=598	+26
49	Bermuda	152-146-152-149=599	+27
50	Belgium	152-152-150-148=602	+30
51	Croatia	156-143-158-149=606	+34
52	Egypt	151-156-154-147=608	+36
53	Turkey	151-150-152-156=609	+37
54	Slovenia	149-156-154-151=610	+38
55	Jamaica	162-150-152-148=612	+40
56	Serbia	150-162-151-150=613	+41
57	Costa Rica	157-152-154-151=614	+42
58	Panama	155-154-157-150=616	+44
59	Cayman Islands	156-153-159-159=627	+55
60	Qatar	153-159-153-164=629	+57
61	El Salvador	156-167-152-155=630	+58
62	Kenya	158-155-165-159=637	+65
63	Greece	162-158-157-162=639	+67
64	United Arab Emirates	158-160-161-161=640	+68
65	Mauritius	160-158-155-168=641	+69
66	Bulgaria	161-170-159-155=645	+73
67	Moldova	165-162-165-166=658	+86
68	Malta	165-166-158-170=659	+87
69	Haiti	176-167-178-179=700	+128
70	Kazakhstan	189-172-190-186=737	+165
71	Armenia	206-221-208-224=859	+287

== Individual leaders ==
There was no official recognition for the lowest individual scores.

Place	Player	Country	Score	To par
1	Cameron Davis	Australia	67-66-68-68=269	−17
2	Curtis Luck	Australia	69-71-63-68=271	−15
T3	Adrian Meronk	Poland	66-69-70-69=274	−12
T3	Alfie Plant	England	69-72-67-66=274	−12
T3	Yun Sung-ho	South Korea	73-66-69-66=274	−12
6	Matthias Schwab	Austria	67-72-69-67=275	−11
T7	Jorge García	Venezuela	69-68-71-68=276	−10
T7	Viktor Hovland	Norway	71-70-70-65=276	−10
9	David Boote	Wales	69-73-68-67=277	−9
10	Ugo Coussaud	France	70-69-67-72=278	−8
