= Manuel Elvira =

Spanish professional golfer (born 1996)

Personal information
- Full name: Manuel Elvira Mijares
- Nationality: Spain
- Born: 14 May 1996 (age 30) Santander, Spain

Career
- Sport: Golf
- College: University of Central Florida
- Turned professional: 2018
- Current tour: European Tour
- Former tours: Challenge Tour; Alps Tour

Manuel Elvira Mijares (born 14 August 1996) is a Spanish professional golfer and European Tour player. He was runner-up at the 2026 BMW PGA Championship at Wentworth Club.

== Amateur career ==
Elvira was in contention at the 2013 Junior Players Championship and ultimately finished 9th. He represented Spain at the 2016 Eisenhower Trophy and four European Amateur Team Championships.

He played college golf at the University of Central Florida between 2014 and 2018, where he won three events and was a three-time American Athletic Conference all-conference team selection.

== Professional career ==
Elvira turned professional in 2018 and shared his time between the Alps Tour and Challenge Tour for the next four years. He was runner-up in his first event, the 2019 Ein Bay Open.

On the Challenge Tour he finished third at the 2022 Big Green Egg German Challenge, one stroke behind winner Alejandro del Rey, before experiencing a breakthrough the next season. In 2023, he was runner-up at the Kaskáda Golf Challenge, Blot Open de Bretagne and The Challenge, finishing 3rd in the season rankings to graduate to the European Tour.

On the European Tour in 2024, he tied for 4th at the Magical Kenya Open, three strokes behind winner Darius van Driel, and kept his card. In 2025, he finished 3rd at the ISCO Championship, an event co-sanctioned by the PGA Tour.

Elvira eagled the penultimate hole to share the lead at the 2026 BMW PGA Championship, where he ultimately finished runner-up two strokes behind J. J. Spaun alongside Rory McIlroy, Aaron Rai and Adam Scott after double-bogeying the final hole at Wentworth.

== Personal life ==
His brother Nacho is a European Tour player.

== Amateur wins ==
- 2012 Campeonato Absoluto del Principado de Asturias
- 2015 Campeonato Excmo Ayto de Llanes
- 2016 FGCU Invitational, FAU Slomin Invitational
- 2017 FGCU Invitational

== Team appearances ==
Amateur

- Eisenhower Trophy (representing Spain): 2016
- European Amateur Team Championship (representing Spain): 2016, 2017 (winners), 2018

== See also ==
- 2023 Challenge Tour graduates
