= 2021 Challenge Tour =

Golf tour season

2021 Challenge Tour season
- Duration: 22 April 2021 – 7 November 2021
- Number of official events: 26 (Note: A further three tournaments were scheduled but were either cancelled or otherwise removed from the schedule.)
- Most wins: (Denmark) Marcus Helligkilde (3)
- Rankings: (Denmark) Marcus Helligkilde

The 2021 Challenge Tour was the 33rd season of the Challenge Tour, the official development tour to the European Tour.

== Changes for 2021 ==
Similarly to 2020, the season was due to begin in February with three tournaments in South Africa co-sanctioned with the Sunshine Tour, but in mid-January the South African swing was postponed to April/May because of COVID-19 pandemic concerns. The official schedule announcement was made on 27 January 2021. As well as the schedule release, it also confirmed that additional European Tour cards would be offered for the following season; being increased from 15 to 20. In April two back-to-back events in Sweden in May were added.

=== In-season changes ===
In August, it was announced that the Hainan Open and the Foshan Open; both played in China, were cancelled. Later in the month, replacement tournaments were confirmed in Spain, both hosted at Empordà Golf on the Costa Brava.

== Schedule ==
The following table lists official events during the 2021 season.

Date	Tournament	Host country	Purse (€)	Winner (Note: The number in brackets after each winner's name is the number of Challenge Tour events they had won up to and including that tournament. This information is only shown for Challenge Tour members. It is rare for someone to accumulate many wins on the Challenge Tour as success at this level usually leads to promotion to the European Tour.)	OWGR points	Other tours (Note: AFR − Sunshine Tour; CHN − China Tour; NGL − Nordic Golf League.)	Notes
25 Apr	Limpopo Championship	South Africa	R3,000,000	(South Africa) Brandon Stone (1)	13	AFR	
2 May	Bain's Whisky Cape Town Open	South Africa	R3,000,000	(South Africa) J. C. Ritchie (2)	13	AFR	
9 May	Dimension Data Pro-Am	South Africa	R6,000,000	(South Africa) Wilco Nienaber (1)	13	AFR	Pro-Am
16 May	Range Servant Challenge	Sweden	200,000	(Scotland) Craig Howie (1)	12		New tournament
22 May	Dormy Open	Sweden	200,000	(France) Félix Mory (1)	12		New tournament
30 May	Irish Challenge	Ireland	220,000	(Netherlands) Daan Huizing (3)	12		
6 Jun	D+D Real Czech Challenge	Czech Republic	200,000	(Spain) Santiago Tarrío (1)	12		
13 Jun	Challenge de Cádiz	Spain	200,000	(Belgium) Kristof Ulenaers (1)	12		
18 Jun	Challenge de España	Spain	200,000	(Spain) Santiago Tarrío (2)	12		
27 Jun	Open de Bretagne	France	200,000	(France) Julien Brun (2)	12		
4 Jul	Kaskáda Golf Challenge	Czech Republic	200,000	(Germany) Marcel Schneider (2)	12		
11 Jul	Le Vaudreuil Golf Challenge	France	210,000	(Germany) Marcel Siem (1)	12		
18 Jul	Euram Bank Open	Austria	190,000	(Wales) Stuart Manley (3)	12		
25 Jul	Italian Challenge	Italy	300,000	(Portugal) Ricardo Gouveia (4)	12		
8 Aug	Vierumäki Finnish Challenge	Finland	200,000	(Denmark) Marcus Helligkilde (1)	12		
14 Aug	Made in Esbjerg Challenge	Denmark	200,000	(Portugal) Ricardo Gouveia (5)	9	NGL	
20 Aug	Sydbank Esbjerg Challenge	Denmark	200,000	(Norway) Espen Kofstad (4)	9	NGL	New tournament
~~21 Aug~~	Rolex Trophy	Switzerland	–	Removed	–		
29 Aug	B-NL Challenge Trophy	Netherlands	250,000	(Spain) Alfredo García-Heredia (1)	12		New tournament (Note: Tournament's debut delayed from 2020.)
5 Sep	British Challenge	England	£180,000	(Chile) Hugo León (1)	12		New tournament
12 Sep	Big Green Egg German Challenge	Germany	200,000	(Spain) Ángel Hidalgo (1)	12		New tournament
19 Sep	Hopps Open de Provence	France	200,000	(England) Alfie Plant (1)	12		
26 Sep	Open de Portugal	Portugal	200,000	(Germany) Marcel Schneider (3)	12		
3 Oct	Swiss Challenge	France	200,000	(Denmark) Marcus Helligkilde (2)	12		
~~17 Oct~~	Hainan Open	China	–	Cancelled	–	CHN	
17 Oct	Empordà Challenge	Spain	200,000	(France) Julien Brun (3)	13		New tournament
22 Oct	Challenge Costa Brava	Spain	200,000	(New Zealand) Daniel Hillier (1)	13		New tournament
~~24 Oct~~	Foshan Open	China	–	Cancelled	–	CHN	
7 Nov	Rolex Challenge Tour Grand Final	Spain	450,000	(Denmark) Marcus Helligkilde (3)	17		Flagship event

== Rankings ==
The rankings were titled as the Road to Mallorca and were based on tournament results during the season, calculated using a points-based system. The top 20 players on the rankings earned status to play on the 2022 European Tour (DP World Tour).

Rank	Player	Points
1	(Denmark) Marcus Helligkilde	222,628
2	(Portugal) Ricardo Gouveia	188,291
3	(Spain) Santiago Tarrío	173,938
4	(France) Julien Brun	163,773
5	(France) Frédéric Lacroix	120,334
