= 2024 China Tour =

Golf tour season

2024 China Tour season
- Duration: 11 April 2024 – 15 December 2024
- Number of official events: 14
- Most wins: (China) Jin Zihao (5)
- Order of Merit: (China) Jin Zihao

The 2024 China Tour, titled as the 2024 Moutai 1935 China Tour for sponsorship reasons, was the 10th season of the China Tour, the main professional golf tour in China since separating from PGA Tour China in 2017.

== Kweichow Moutai title sponsorship ==
In April, it was announced that the tour had signed a title sponsorship agreement with Kweichow Moutai, being renamed as the Moutai 1935 China Tour.

== European Tour strategic alliance formalisation ==
In January, it was announced by the European Tour that they had formalised their strategic alliance with the China Golf Association. The agreement would see the leading player on the China Tour Order of Merit earn status to play on the European Tour (DP World Tour) for the following season (which had already been in place since 2017). Additionally the next player on the Order of Merit would earn status to play on the Challenge Tour for the following season. The Volvo China Open was also confirmed as a co-sanctioned event for the 2024 season.

== Schedule ==
The following table lists official events during the 2024 season.

Date	Tournament	Location	Purse (CN¥)	Winner (Note: The number in brackets after each winner's name is the number of China Tour events they had won up to and including that tournament.)	OWGR points	Other tours (Note: CHA − Challenge Tour; EUR − European Tour.)
14 Apr	Hainan Baoting Open	Hainan	1,000,000	(Philippines) Lloyd Jefferson Go (1)	0.65	
5 May	Volvo China Open	Shenzhen	US$2,250,000	(Spain) Adrián Otaegui (n/a)	14.59	EUR
2 Jun	Zhengzhou Yellow-River Open	Henan	1,000,000	(China) Cheng Xirong (a) (1)	0.72	
16 Jun	Guangdong Gaoyao Jinli Open	Guangdong	1,000,000	(China) Jin Zihao (1)	0.63	
11 Aug	Wuhan Modern-Land Beyond Sky Open	Wuhan	1,000,000	(China) Xiao Bowen (3)	0.63	
29 Sep	Shandong Cultural and Tourism Jinan Open	Shandong	1,000,000	(China) Jin Zihao (2)	0.60	
13 Oct	Hainan Open	Hainan	US$500,000	(Denmark) Hamish Brown (n/a)	5.40	CHA
20 Oct	Hangzhou Open	Zhejiang	US$500,000	(Republic of Ireland) Conor Purcell (n/a)	5.59	CHA
27 Oct	AITO China Sports Lottery Championship	Chongqing	1,200,000	(Hong Kong) Hak Shunyat (4)	0.70	
3 Nov	Ruiquan Golf Cup Wuyishan International Open	Zhejiang	1,000,000	(China) Jin Zihao (3)	0.54	
10 Nov	Hengdian Celebrity Pro-Am Golf Championship	Zhejiang	1,700,000	(China) Jin Zihao (4)	0.87	
24 Nov	Straits Cup Xiamen Open	Xiamen	1,000,000	(China) Zhou Yanhan (3)	0.67	
1 Dec	Chongqing Open	Chongqing	1,000,000	(China) Zhou Yanhan (4)	0.58	
15 Dec	China Tour Championship	Guangdong	1,700,000	(China) Jin Zihao (5)	0.95	

== Order of Merit ==
The Order of Merit was based on prize money won during the season, calculated in Renminbi. The leading player on the Order of Merit earned status to play on the 2025 European Tour (DP World Tour). The next player on the Order of Merit earned status to play on the 2025 Challenge Tour (HotelPlanner Tour).

Position	Player	Prize money (CN¥)	Status earned
1	(China) Jin Zihao	1,624,176	Promoted to European Tour
2	(Philippines) Lloyd Jefferson Go	954,601	Promoted to Challenge Tour
3	(China) Zhou Yanhan	905,460	
4	(Germany) Jan Schneider	420,723	
5	(China) Xiao Bowen	415,334	
