= 2023 European Tour Qualifying School graduates =

Golf qualifying tournament in Spain

2023 European Tour Qualifying School Final Stage
Tournament information
- Dates: 10–15 November 2023
- Location: Tarragona, Spain; 41.0798°N 1.1615°E
- Courses: Infinitum Golf (Lakes & Hills Courses)
- Tours: European Tour (unofficial event)

Statistics
- Par: 71 (L); 72 (H)
- Length: 7,001 yards (6,402 m) (L); 6,956 yards (6,361 m) (H)
- Field: 156, 78 after cut
- Cut: 281 (−5)
- Prize fund: €210,000
- Winner's share: €21,000

Champion
- (Germany) Freddy Schott
- 401 (−27)

Location map
- Location in Spain Location in Catalonia

The 2023 European Tour Qualifying School graduates were determined following the conclusion of the 2023 European Tour (DP World Tour) Qualifying School Final Stage which was played 10–15 November at Infinitum Golf in Tarragona, Spain. It was the 46th edition of the European Tour Qualifying School. The top 25 and ties (33 in total) earned status to play on the 2024 European Tour, with the remaining players who finished outside the top 25 and ties, but having made the 72-hole cut, earning status to play on the 2024 Challenge Tour.

Freddy Schott won the event, scoring a six-round total of 401 (27 under par).

Graduates who went on to win on the European Tour in 2024 included Darius van Driel at the Magical Kenya Open and David Ravetto at the D+D Real Czech Masters.

== Results ==
The top 25 players (including ties) earned status to play on the 2024 European Tour. They were as follows:

Place	Player	Score	To par
1	(Germany) Freddy Schott	68-63-75-66-64-65=401	−27
2	(Italy) Filippo Celli	68-66-66-66-70-68=403	−25
T3	(Belgium) Matthis Besard	70-67-70-65-68-65=405	−23
T3	(Netherlands) Darius van Driel	70-66-70-66-65-68=405	−23
T3	(Denmark) Sebastian Friedrichsen	67-66-68-67-66-71=405	−23
T6	(England) Tom Lewis	71-69-73-61-67-65=406	−22
T6	(New Zealand) Sam Jones	68-69-70-65-68-66=406	−22
8	(Spain) Sebastián García Rodríguez	67-65-69-69-75-62=407	−21
T9	(Norway) Kristian Krogh Johannessen	68-67-73-65-67-68=408	−20
T9	(Australia) Haydn Barron	67-72-70-64-66-69=408	−20
T11	(Italy) Renato Paratore	73-64-71-69-67-65=409	−19
T11	(South Africa) Jacques Kruyswijk	70-67-70-66-66-68=409	−19
T11	(Wales) Jack Davidson	67-66-70-66-70-70=409	−19
T14	(Thailand) Kiradech Aphibarnrat	71-70-67-69-69-64=410	−18
T14	(England) Andrew Wilson	69-70-69-69-65-68=410	−18
16	(France) David Ravetto	71-70-70-65-66-70=412	−16
T17	(Switzerland) Benjamin Rusch	72-72-68-68-67-66=413	−15
T17	(England) Garrick Porteous	69-69-73-66-66-70=413	−15
T17	(United States) Nicolo Galletti	71-69-67-66-70-70=413	−15
T17	(England) Joshua Berry	67-68-70-67-71-70=413	−15
T17	(South Africa) Pieter Moolman	71-66-70-64-70-72=413	−15
T22	(Finland) Lauri Ruuska	76-66-67-70-69-66=414	−14
T22	(United States) James Nicholas	68-71-69-69-70-67=414	−14
T22	(Spain) Alfredo García-Heredia	69-68-70-71-68-68=414	−14
T22	(England) Joe Dean	69-72-67-67-71-68=414	−14
T22	(Portugal) Pedro Figueiredo	70-68-70-71-66-69=414	−14
T22	(Denmark) Søren Broholt Lind	72-67-71-68-67-69=414	−14
T22	(South Africa) Darren Fichardt	69-67-71-71-67-69=414	−14
T22	(Germany) Nicolai von Dellingshausen	71-66-69-68-71-69=414	−14
T22	(Germany) Jannik de Bruyn	66-71-67-73-67-70=414	−14
T22	(Wales) Rhys Enoch	75-65-69-67-67-71=414	−14
T22	(Sweden) Kristoffer Broberg	69-66-70-69-69-71=414	−14
T22	(Denmark) Jonathan Gøth-Rasmussen	69-65-68-69-69-74=414	−14

The following players made the 72 hole cut, however finished outside the top 25 and ties, therefore earning status to play on the 2024 Challenge Tour.

- (United States) Braden Thornberry (T34)
- (Spain) Joel Moscatel (T34)
- (France) Félix Mory (T34)
- (Finland) Oliver Lindell (T34)
- (England) Gary Boyd (T34)
- (France) Pierre Pineau (T39)
- (England) Sam Hutsby (T39)
- (France) Robin Sciot-Siegrist (T39)
- (Australia) Hayden Hopewell (T39)
- (England) Steven Brown (T39)
- (France) Grégory Bourdy (T39)
- (Scotland) Daniel Young (T39)
- (United States) John Catlin (T39)
- (South Africa) Deon Germishuys (T47)
- (Spain) Quim Vidal (T47)
- (Northern Ireland) Jonathan Caldwell (T47)
- (Sweden) Mikael Lindberg (T50)
- (Spain) Manuel Quirós (T50)
- (Zimbabwe) Benjamin Follett-Smith (T50)
- (France) Alexander Lévy (T53)
- (Netherlands) Lars van Meijel (T53)
- (Germany) Philipp Katich (T53)
- (Denmark) Rasmus Neergaard-Petersen (T53)
- (England) George Mason (T53)
- (Denmark) Jeppe Kristian Andersen (T53)
- (France) Maxence Giboudot (T59)
- (Denmark) Hamish Brown (T59)
- (Netherlands) Wil Besseling (T59)
- (South Africa) J. J. Senekal (T59)
- (Australia) Connor McKinney (T59)
- (South Africa) Thomas Aiken (T64)
- (Denmark) Martin Simonsen (T64)
- (England) Tom Shadbolt (T64)
- (Italy) Pietro Bovari (T64)
- (Spain) Lucas Vacarisas (T64)
- (Denmark) Oliver Hundebøll (69)
- (United States) Jordan Gumberg (T70)
- (South Korea) Kim Min-kyu (T70)
- (Switzerland) Ronan Kleu (T70)
- (Sweden) Christofer Blomstrand (T70)
- (Scotland) Marc Warren (74)
- (France) Martin Couvra (75)
- (England) Richard McEvoy (T76)
- (Iceland) Haraldur Magnús (T76)
- (South Africa) Albert Venter (78)

== Graduates ==
Place	Player	Career ET starts	Cuts made	Best finish
1	(Germany) Freddy Schott	37	14	T10
2	(Italy) Filippo Celli (Note: European Tour rookie in 2024)	14	6	T12
T3	(Belgium) Matthis Besard	1	0	CUT
T3	(Netherlands) Darius van Driel	106	55	2nd/T2
T3	(Denmark) Sebastian Friedrichsen	1	0	CUT
T6	(England) Tom Lewis	226	133	Win (x2)
T6	(New Zealand) Sam Jones	0	0	n/a
8	(Spain) Sebastián García Rodríguez	104	46	4th
T9	(Norway) Kristian Krogh Johannessen	55	25	3rd/T3
T9	(Australia) Haydn Barron	4	2	T4
T11	(Italy) Renato Paratore	244	136	Win (x2)
T11	(South Africa) Jacques Kruyswijk	113	54	T4
T11	(Wales) Jack Davidson	6	1	T50
T14	(Thailand) Kiradech Aphibarnrat	202	126	Win (x4)
T14	(England) Andrew Wilson	51	23	7th
16	(France) David Ravetto	32	14	T9
T17	(Switzerland) Benjamin Rusch	13	3	T23
T17	(England) Garrick Porteous	106	42	T4
T17	(United States) Nicolo Galletti	0	0	n/a
T17	(England) Joshua Berry	1	0	CUT
T17	(South Africa) Pieter Moolman (Note: First-time full European Tour member in 2024, but ineligible for rookie status)	17	4	T43
T22	(Finland) Lauri Ruuska	2	2	T25
T22	(United States) James Nicholas	0	0	n/a
T22	(Spain) Alfredo García-Heredia	115	51	2nd
T22	(England) Joe Dean	4	2	T70
T22	(Portugal) Pedro Figueiredo	124	49	T9
T22	(Denmark) Søren Broholt Lind	1	0	CUT
T22	(South Africa) Darren Fichardt	451	249	Win (x5)
T22	(Germany) Nicolai von Dellingshausen	83	37	2nd/T2
T22	(Germany) Jannik de Bruyn	7	4	T15
T22	(Wales) Rhys Enoch	67	29	T12
T22	(Sweden) Kristoffer Broberg	189	100	Win (x2)
T22	(Denmark) Jonathan Gøth-Rasmussen	0	0	n/a

=== 2024 European Tour results ===
Player	Starts	Cuts made	Best finish	R2D rank	Prize money (€)
(Germany) Freddy Schott	27	12	T11	117	276,164
(Italy) Filippo Celli	25	12	T9	133	271,840
(Belgium) Matthis Besard	26	10	T6	138	224,582
(Netherlands) Darius van Driel	26	16	Win	45	848,298
(Denmark) Sebastian Friedrichsen	27	13	T17	149	153,298
(England) Tom Lewis	23	10	T8	166	147,604
(New Zealand) Sam Jones	24	10	T7	144	199,453
(Spain) Sebastián García Rodríguez	24	10	T7	132	257,792
(Norway) Kristian Krogh Johannessen	18	6	T25	189	57,850
(Australia) Haydn Barron	23	6	T9	180	88,205
(Italy) Renato Paratore	25	5	T2	131	171,262
(South Africa) Jacques Kruyswijk	21	12	T4	104	271,570
(Wales) Jack Davidson	19	6	T13	170	132,988
(Thailand) Kiradech Aphibarnrat	24	12	2nd	98	389,862
(England) Andrew Wilson	19	12	T9	111	321,497
(France) David Ravetto	30	14	Win	50	796,145
(Switzerland) Benjamin Rusch	16	7	T34	205	50,534
(England) Garrick Porteous	15	6	T8	186	80,924
(United States) Nicolo Galletti	13	5	T11	185	77,932
(England) Joshua Berry (Note: Berry retained his European Tour card for 2025 by finishing T10 at the 2024 European Tour Qualifying School.)	17	3	T23	207	45,931
(South Africa) Pieter Moolman	20	7	T26	177	91,292
(Finland) Lauri Ruuska	16	5	T10	196	74,501
(United States) James Nicholas	20	7	T5	156	178,908
(Spain) Alfredo García-Heredia	21	10	2nd	75	481,942
(England) Joe Dean	19	16	T2	37	1,006,736
(Portugal) Pedro Figueiredo	16	5	T5	155	154,151
(Denmark) Søren Broholt Lind	15	3	T18	213	22,176
(South Africa) Darren Fichardt	22	10	2nd	91	295,191
(Germany) Nicolai von Dellingshausen (Note: Von Dellingshausen retained his European Tour card for 2025 by finishing 21st on the 2024 Challenge Tour Rankings.)	12	8	T17	174	122,217
(Germany) Jannik de Bruyn	14	11	T3	121	324,381
(Wales) Rhys Enoch	11	3	T7	197	64,540
(Sweden) Kristoffer Broberg	7	3	T29	210	38,153
(Denmark) Jonathan Gøth-Rasmussen	12	4	T42	211	36,611

T = Tied
Player retained his European Tour card for 2025 (finished inside the top 114)
Player did not retain his European Tour card for 2025, but retained conditional status (finished between 115 and 130, inclusive)
Player did not retain his European Tour card for 2025 (finished outside the top 130)

=== 2024 European Tour winners ===
No.	Date	Player	Tournament	Winning score	Margin of victory	Runner(s)-up
1	25 Feb	(Netherlands) Darius van Driel	Magical Kenya Open	−14 (66-69-68-67=270)	2 strokes	(England) Joe Dean (Spain) Nacho Elvira
2	18 Aug	(France) David Ravetto	D+D Real Czech Masters	−23 (68-63-70-64=270)	4 strokes	(Sweden) Jesper Svensson

=== 2024 European Tour runner-up finishes ===
No.	Date	Player	Tournament	Winner	Winning score	Runner-up score
1	26 Nov 2023	(South Africa) Darren Fichardt	Joburg Open	(South Africa) Dean Burmester	−18 (68-62-68-64=262)	−15 (66-67-68-64=265)
2	3 Dec	(Italy) Renato Paratore	Investec South African Open Championship	(South Africa) Dean Burmester	−11 (70-74-65-68=277)	−8 (69-71-70-70=280)
3	25 Feb 2024	(England) Joe Dean	Magical Kenya Open	(Netherlands) Darius van Driel	−14 (66-69-68-67=270)	−12 (68-69-68-67=272)
4	24 Mar	(Thailand) Kiradech Aphibarnrat (Note: Lost in a playoff)	Porsche Singapore Classic	(Sweden) Jesper Svensson	−17 (68-73-67-63=271)	−17 (64-72-71-64=271)
5	23 Jun	(England) Joe Dean (2)	KLM Open	(Italy) Guido Migliozzi	−11 (68-69-66-70=273)	−11 (70-66-69-68=273)

== See also ==
- 2023 Challenge Tour graduates
