= Ding Wenyi =

Chinese professional golfer (born 2004)

Personal information
- Nationality: China
- Born: 19 November 2004 (age 21) Beijing, China
- Height: 1.91 m (6 ft 3 in)

Career
- Sport: Golf
- College: Arizona State University
- Turned professional: 2024
- Current tour: European Tour
- Professional wins: 1

Best results in major championships
- Masters Tournament: DNP
- PGA Championship: DNP
- U.S. Open: CUT: 2023
- The Open Championship: DNP

Achievements and awards
- Pac-12 Player of the Year: 2024
- Pac-12 Freshman of the Year: 2024
Medal record
Men's golf
Representing China
Asian Games
| Gold medal – first place | 2026 Aichi–Nagoya | Men's team |

Ding Wenyi (Chinese: 丁文一; born 19 November 2004) is a Chinese professional golfer.

== Early life and family ==
Ding was born in Beijing, China, where his father, Feng, worked as a football coach.

== Amateur career ==
Ding won the Chinese Amateur Open three times, in 2019, 2020 and 2021. In 2020, he finished as runner-up in the Volvo China Open on the China Tour, and the following year won the tour's Boao Classic. In 2022, he won the U.S. Junior Amateur, defeating Caleb Surratt, 3 and 2, in the final. In 2023, he enrolled at Arizona State University. That year, he was also runner-up in the Asia-Pacific Amateur Championship, losing in a playoff, and had two top-ten finishes in professional tournaments in China, at the Hainan Open on the Challenge Tour and the Volvo China Open on the Asian Tour. In 2024, he won the Amer Ari Invitational, the Southern Amateur and the Asia-Pacific Amateur Championship, was crowned the Pac-12 Conference Freshman of the Year and Player of the Year, and named a first-team All American. Having left college to meet eligibility requirements, he finished top of the Global Amateur Pathway rankings to gain status on the DP World Tour for 2025. He reached a high of third in the World Amateur Golf Ranking.

== Professional career ==
In October 2024, Ding turned professional and confirmed that he would be joining the European Tour. By turning professional, he forfeited exemptions into the Masters Tournament and U. S. Open gained from his Asia-Pacific Amateur Championship win. His first tournament as a professional was the Hangzhou Open on the Challenge Tour, where he finished in a tie for 11th place.

== Amateur wins ==
- 2019 Chinese Amateur Open
- 2020 Chinese Amateur Open
- 2021 Chinese Amateur Open
- 2022 U.S. Junior Amateur
- 2024 Amer Ari Invitational, Southern Amateur, Asia-Pacific Amateur Championship

== Professional wins (1) ==
=== China Tour wins (1) ===
| No. | Date | Tournament | Winning score | Margin of victory | Runner-up |
|---|---|---|---|---|---|
| 1 | 1 May 2021 | Boao Classic (as an amateur) | −23 (67-67-64-67=265) | 4 strokes | (China) Chen Peicheng (a) |

== Results in major championships ==
| Tournament | 2023 |
|---|---|
| Masters Tournament | |
| PGA Championship | |
| U.S. Open | CUT |
| The Open Championship | |

Did not play

CUT = missed the halfway cut
