= 2025 China Tour =

Golf tour season

2025 China Tour season
- Duration: 17 April 2025 – 21 December 2025
- Number of official events: 19
- Most wins: (China) Zhou Yanhan (7)
- Order of Merit: (China) Zhou Yanhan

The 2025 China Tour was the 11th season of the China Tour, the main professional golf tour in China since separating from PGA Tour China in 2017.

== Schedule ==
The following table lists official events during the 2025 season.

Date	Tournament	Location	Purse (CN¥)	Winner (Note: The number in brackets after each winner's name is the number of China Tour events they had won up to and including that tournament.)	OWGR points	Other tours (Note: CHA − Challenge Tour; EUR − European Tour.)
20 Apr	Volvo China Open	Shanghai	US$2,550,000	(China) Wu Ashun (n/a)	16.75	EUR
27 Apr	Hainan Classic	Hainan	US$2,550,000	(England) Marco Penge (n/a)	16.37	EUR
18 May	Chongqing Open	Chongqing	1,000,000	(China) Zhou Yanhan (5)	1.66	
25 May	Hengdian Celebrity Pro-Am Golf Championship	Zhejiang	1,700,000	(China) Zhang Xinjun (4)	1.23	
8 Jun	Zhengzhou Yellow-River Open	Henan	1,000,000	(China) Tong Yang (2)	1.69	
22 Jun	Shandong Culture and Tourism Jinan Open	Shandong	1,000,000	(China) Zhou Yanhan (6)	1.69	
29 Jun	Guangdong Open	Guangdong	1,000,000	(China) Charles Wang (1)	1.44	
31 Aug	Shaanxi Open	Shaanxi	1,000,000	(Japan) Kakeru Ozeki (1)	1.56	
14 Sep	Golfjoy Open	Beijing	1,000,000	(China) Zhou Yanhan (7)	1.89	
21 Sep	Ruiquan Wuyishan International Open	Fujian	1,000,000	(Hong Kong) Isaac Lam (1)	1.86	
28 Sep	Jingpai Wuhan Modern Land Beyond Sky Open	Wuhan	1,000,000	(China) Zhou Yanhan (8)	1.83	
12 Oct	Hainan Open	Hainan	US$500,000	(Italy) Renato Paratore (n/a)	7.42	CHA
19 Oct	Hangzhou Open	Zhejiang	US$500,000	(Spain) Sebastián García Rodríguez (n/a)	7.36	CHA
2 Nov	Hongyun Lang Wanning Open	Hainan	1,000,000	(China) Zhou Yanhan (9)	1.56	
23 Nov	Hongyun Lang Chengdu Open	Chengdu	1,000,000	(China) Zhou Yanhan (10)	1.64	
30 Nov	China Sports Lottery Match Play Championship	Chongqing	1,200,000	(United States) Shawn Lu (1)	1.70	
7 Dec	Shanghai Open	Shanghai	1,000,000	(China) Zhou Yanhan (11)	1.47	
14 Dec	Hongyun Lang Straits Cup Xiamen Open	Xiamen	1,000,000	(United States) Justin Sui (1)	1.02	
21 Dec	China Tour Championship	Guangdong	2,000,000	(Germany) Jan Schneider (1)	0.99	

== Order of Merit ==
The Order of Merit was based on tournament results during the season, calculated using a points-based system. The leading player on the Order of Merit earned status to play on the 2026 European Tour (DP World Tour). The next player on the Order of Merit earned status to play on the 2026 Challenge Tour (HotelPlanner Tour).

Position	Player	Points	Status earned
1	(China) Zhou Yanhan	1,765	Promoted to European Tour
2	(Germany) Jan Schneider	700	Promoted to Challenge Tour
3	(China) Charles Wang	688	
4	(China) Chai Bowen	488	
5	(United States) Shawn Lu	449	
