= Sarit Suwannarut =

Thai professional golfer (born 1998)

Personal information
- Nickname: Safe
- Nationality: Thailand
- Born: 8 January 1998 (age 28)

Career
- Sport: Golf
- Turned professional: 2018
- Current tours: Asian Tour; All Thailand Golf Tour; China Tour
- Former tour: Asian Development Tour
- Professional wins: 6

Number of wins by tour
- Asian Tour: 2
- Other: 4
Medal record
Men's golf
Representing Thailand
SEA Games
Gold medal – first place	2015 Singapore	Team

Sarit Suwannarut (Thai: สาริศ สุวรรณรัตน์; born 8 January 1998) is a Thai professional golfer who plays on the Asian Tour.

== Amateur career ==
Sarit won the Singha Pattaya Open on the All Thailand Golf Tour as an amateur in July 2016.

== Professional career ==
Sarit turned professional in 2018 and got his first Asian Tour title at the BNI Indonesian Masters in December 2022. He clinched his second Asian Tour victory in November 2023 at the Volvo China Open.

== Professional wins (6) ==
=== Asian Tour wins (2) ===
Legend
International Series (2)
Other Asian Tour

No.	Date	Tournament	Winning score	Margin of victory	Runner(s)-up
1	4 Dec 2022	BNI Indonesian Masters	−20 (66-67-67-68=268)	4 strokes	(India) Anirban Lahiri
2	5 Nov 2023	Volvo China Open^{1}	−19 (70-70-65-64=269)	6 strokes	(China) Chen Guxin, (Hong Kong) Kho Taichi

^{1}Co-sanctioned by the China Tour

=== Asian Development Tour wins (1) ===
No.	Date	Tournament	Winning score	Margin of victory	Runners-up
1	28 Jun 2026	Bangkok Classic^{1}	−24 (62-67-67-68=264)	6 strokes	(Hong Kong) Hak Shunyat, (England) Matt Killen

^{1}Co-sanctioned by the China Tour

=== China Tour wins (2) ===
No.	Date	Tournament	Winning score	Margin of victory	Runners-up
1	5 Nov 2023	Volvo China Open^{1}	−19 (70-70-65-64=269)	6 strokes	(China) Chen Guxin, (Hong Kong) Kho Taichi
2	28 Jun 2026	Bangkok Classic^{2}	−24 (62-67-67-68=264)	6 strokes	(Hong Kong) Hak Shunyat, (England) Matt Killen

^{1}Co-sanctioned by the Asian Tour
^{2}Co-sanctioned by the Asian Development Tour

=== All Thailand Golf Tour wins (2) ===
No.	Date	Tournament	Winning score	Margin of victory	Runner(s)-up
1	17 Jul 2016	Singha Pattaya Open^{1} (as an amateur)	−16 (67-66-64-67=264)	Playoff	(Thailand) Udorn Duangdecha
2	2 Jun 2019	Singha Classic	−14 (65-74-66-65=270)	1 stroke	(South Korea) Tom Kim, (Thailand) Kasidit Lepkurte, (Thailand) Poosit Supupramai

^{1}Co-sanctioned by the ASEAN PGA Tour

=== Thailand PGA Tour wins (1) ===
No.	Date	Tournament	Winning score	Margin of victory	Runner-up
1	15 Jun 2025	Singha-SAT BG Match Play Championship	4 and 3		(Thailand) Ratchapol Jantavara

== Team appearances ==
Amateur

- SEA Games (representing Thailand): 2015 (winners)
