= Renato Paratore =

Italian professional golfer

Personal information
- Nationality: Italy
- Born: 14 December 1996 (age 29) Rome, Italy
- Height: 1.91 m (6 ft 3 in)
- Weight: 82 kg (181 lb; 12.9 st)

Career
- Sport: Golf
- Turned professional: 2014
- Current tour: Challenge Tour
- Former tour: European Tour
- Professional wins: 6

Number of wins by tour
- European Tour: 2
- Challenge Tour: 3
- Other: 1

Best results in major championships
- Masters Tournament: DNP
- PGA Championship: DNP
- U.S. Open: T31: 2020
- The Open Championship: DNP
Medal record
Youth Olympic Games
Gold medal – first place	2014 Nanjing	Boys' individual
Bronze medal – third place	2014 Nanjing	Mixed team

Renato Paratore (born 14 December 1996) is an Italian professional golfer who plays on the European Tour. He competed at the 2020 Summer Olympics.

== Amateur career ==
As an amateur, Paratore had his breakthrough reaching the quarterfinals of the 2013 Amateur Championship at Royal Cinque Ports. Between 2013 and 2014 he won the Junior Orange Bowl in Miami, the Portuguese Amateur Championship, the Trofeo International Umberto Agnelli, the Italian Amateur Stroke Play Championship and the Men's Individual Gold at Youth Olympics. He played in the Junior Ryder Cup twice.

In November 2014, at 17 years of age (the youngest man in the field at European Tour Qualifying School), Paratore obtained his European Tour card.

== Professional career ==
Paratore made his European Tour debut in December 2014 at the Alfred Dunhill Championship in Malelane, South Africa, where he finished tied for the 26th place. After a positive start to the season, where he made 7 consecutive cuts, he struggled to get more positive results. In July 2015 at the Open de France, he became the first player in European Tour history to score a four on every hole. He obtained the best result of his first season at the end of August with a 5th place at the D+D Real Czech Masters. Despite being disqualified in the final event of his season for signing an incorrect score, Paratore managed to finish 109th in the Race to Dubai, just enough to keep his card for 2017. Paratore earned his first European Tour win at the 2017 Nordea Masters.

In July 2020, Paratore won the Betfred British Masters by three strokes over Rasmus Højgaard.

After struggling on the European Tour, Paratore returned to the Challenge Tour for 2025, where he earned three wins to earn a return to the European Tour for 2026.

== Amateur wins ==
- 2014 Portuguese Amateur Championship, Trofeo International Umberto Agnelli, Italian Amateur Stroke Play, Men's Individual Gold at Youth Olympics

== Professional wins (6) ==
=== European Tour wins (2) ===
No.	Date	Tournament	Winning score	Margin of victory	Runner(s)-up
1	4 Jun 2017	Nordea Masters	−11 (68-72-71-70=281)	1 stroke	(England) Matt Fitzpatrick, (England) Chris Wood
2	25 Jul 2020	Betfred British Masters	−18 (65-66-66-69=266)	3 strokes	(Denmark) Rasmus Højgaard

European Tour playoff record (0–1)

No.	Year	Tournament	Opponents	Result
1	2019	AfrAsia Bank Mauritius Open	(Denmark) Rasmus Højgaard, (France) Antoine Rozner	Højgaard won with eagle on third extra hole Paratore eliminated by birdie on first hole

=== Challenge Tour wins (3) ===
No.	Date	Tournament	Winning score	Margin of victory	Runner(s)-up
1	13 Apr 2025	UAE Challenge	−22 (69-68-64-65=266)	2 strokes	(South Africa) J. C. Ritchie
2	20 Apr 2025	Abu Dhabi Challenge	−17 (69-63-65-66=263)	1 stroke	(Spain) Sebastián García Rodríguez, (Scotland) David Law
3	12 Oct 2025	Hainan Open^{1}	−17 (69-70-66-66=271)	Playoff	(Austria) Maximilian Steinlechner

^{1}Co-sanctioned by the China Tour

Challenge Tour playoff record (1–0)

No.	Year	Tournament	Opponent	Result
1	2025	Hainan Open	(Austria) Maximilian Steinlechner	Won with par on first extra hole

=== Italian Pro Tour wins (1) ===
No.	Date	Tournament	Winning score	Margin of victory	Runner-up
1	30 Nov 2014	Italian National Open Championship	−10 (71-71-70-62=274)	Playoff	(Italy) Andrea Pavan

== Results in major championships ==
Results not in chronological order in 2020.

Tournament	2019	2020
Masters Tournament		
PGA Championship		
U.S. Open	CUT	T31
The Open Championship		NT

Did not play

CUT = missed the halfway cut
NT = No tournament due to COVID-19 pandemic

== Results in World Golf Championships ==
Tournament	2017
Championship	
Match Play	
Invitational	T44
Champions	

Did not play

"T" = Tied

== Team appearances ==
Amateur

- Junior Ryder Cup (representing Europe): 2012, 2014
- Eisenhower Trophy (representing Italy): 2012, 2014
- European Boys' Team Championship (representing Italy): 2013, 2014
- Bonallack Trophy (representing Europe): 2014 (winners)
- Jacques Léglise Trophy (representing the Continent of Europe): 2012 (winners), 2013
- Summer Youth Olympics mixed team (representing Italy): 2014

Professional

- World Cup (representing Italy): 2018

== See also ==
- 2014 European Tour Qualifying School graduates
- 2023 European Tour Qualifying School graduates
- 2025 Challenge Tour graduates
- List of golfers to achieve a three-win promotion from the Challenge Tour
