= 2023 Challenge Tour =

Golf tour season

2023 Challenge Tour season
- Duration: 2 February 2023 – 5 November 2023
- Number of official events: 30
- Most wins: (Portugal) Ricardo Gouveia (2) (Italy) Matteo Manassero (2) (England) Marco Penge (2) (Germany) Max Rottluff (2)
- Rankings: (England) Marco Penge

The 2023 Challenge Tour was the 35th season of the Challenge Tour, the official development tour to the European Tour.

== Schedule ==
The following table lists official events during the 2023 season.

Date	Tournament	Host country	Purse (€)	Winner (Note: The number in brackets after each winner's name is the number of Challenge Tour events they had won up to and including that tournament. This information is only shown for Challenge Tour members. It is rare for someone to accumulate many wins on the Challenge Tour as success at this level usually leads to promotion to the European Tour.)	OWGR points	Other tours (Note: AFR − Sunshine Tour; CHN − China Tour; PGTI − Professional Golf Tour of India.)	Notes
5 Feb	Bain's Whisky Cape Town Open	South Africa	US$350,000	(Zimbabwe) Benjamin Follett-Smith (1)	5.67	AFR	
12 Feb	Dimension Data Pro-Am	South Africa	R7,000,000	(South Africa) Oliver Bekker (1)	6.05	AFR	Pro-Am
19 Feb	SDC Open	South Africa	US$350,000	(South Africa) J. J. Senekal (1)	5.21	AFR	
26 Feb	Nelson Mandela Bay Championship	South Africa	US$350,000	(South Africa) Dylan Mostert (1)	5.25	AFR	New tournament
26 Mar	Duncan Taylor Black Bull Challenge	India	US$300,000	(India) Om Prakash Chouhan (1)	4.51	PGTI	New tournament
31 Mar	The Challenge	India	US$300,000	(France) Ugo Coussaud (1)	4.65	PGTI	New tournament
30 Apr	Abu Dhabi Challenge	UAE	US$300,000	(Portugal) Ricardo Gouveia (6)	6.21		New tournament
7 May	UAE Challenge	UAE	US$300,000	(Germany) Max Rottluff (1)	5.85		New tournament
21 May	B-NL Challenge Trophy	Netherlands	250,000	(Sweden) Jesper Svensson (1)	5.41		
28 May	Copenhagen Challenge	Denmark	250,000	(Italy) Matteo Manassero (1)	5.48		
4 Jun	D+D Real Czech Challenge	Czech Republic	265,000	(Italy) Andrea Pavan (5)	4.67		
11 Jun	Andalucía Challenge de Cádiz	Spain	250,000	(England) Sam Hutsby (2)	5.32		
18 Jun	Kaskáda Golf Challenge	Czech Republic	265,000	(Italy) Lorenzo Scalise (1)	4.48		
25 Jun	Blot Open de Bretagne	France	270,000	(Wales) Stuart Manley (4)	4.44		
2 Jul	Le Vaudreuil Golf Challenge	France	260,000	(South Africa) Darren Fichardt (2)	5.51		
9 Jul	Italian Challenge Open	Italy	350,000	(Italy) Matteo Manassero (2)	5.71		
16 Jul	Euram Bank Open	Austria	250,000	(South Africa) Casey Jarvis (1)	4.20		
23 Jul	Big Green Egg German Challenge	Germany	250,000	(Italy) Francesco Laporta (3)	5.09		
30 Jul	Irish Challenge	Ireland	250,000	(England) Brandon Robinson-Thompson (1)	5.78		
6 Aug	British Challenge	England	£230,000	(England) Alex Fitzpatrick (1)	6.14		
13 Aug	Farmfoods Scottish Challenge	Scotland	£230,000	(England) Sam Bairstow (1)	5.82		
20 Aug	Vierumäki Finnish Challenge	Finland	250,000	(Finland) Lauri Ruuska (1)	3.43		
27 Aug	Dormy Open	Sweden	250,000	(South Africa) Jacques Kruyswijk (1)	5.71		
3 Sep	Indoor Golf Group Challenge	Sweden	250,000	(Germany) Max Rottluff (2)	5.93		
10 Sep	Challenge de España	Spain	250,000	(France) Martin Couvra (a) (1)	6.00		
17 Sep	Open de Portugal	Portugal	250,000	(England) Marco Penge (1)	6.43		
24 Sep	Swiss Challenge	France	250,000	(Sweden) Adam Blommé (1)	5.78		
8 Oct	Hopps Open de Provence	France	260,000	(Spain) Lucas Vacarisas (1)	5.10		
16 Oct	Hainan Open	China	US$500,000	(Portugal) Ricardo Gouveia (7)	4.27	CHN	
5 Nov	Rolex Challenge Tour Grand Final	Spain	500,000	(England) Marco Penge (2)	3.51		Tour Championship

== Rankings ==
The rankings were titled as the Road to Mallorca and were based on tournament results during the season, calculated using a points-based system. The top 21 players on the rankings earned status to play on the 2024 European Tour (DP World Tour). (Note: Alex Fitzpatrick (11th) was already exempt via the 2023 Race to Dubai; status was extended to the player ranked 21st (Stuart Manley).)

Rank	Player	Points
1	(England) Marco Penge	1,285
2	(South Africa) Casey Jarvis	1,278
3	(Spain) Manuel Elvira	1,262
4	(France) Ugo Coussaud	1,240
5	(Sweden) Jesper Svensson	1,221
