= Conor Purcell =

Irish professional golfer (born 1997)

Personal information
- Nationality: Ireland
- Born: 20 June 1997 (age 29) County Dublin, Ireland
- Height: 5 ft 8 in (1.73 m)

Career
- Sport: Golf
- College: University of North Carolina at Charlotte
- Turned professional: 2019
- Current tour: Challenge Tour
- Former tours: European Tour; Alps Tour; MENA Golf Tour
- Professional wins: 2

Number of wins by tour
- Challenge Tour: 2

Conor Purcell (born 20 June 1997) is an Irish professional golfer and European Tour player. He has won two titles on the Challenge Tour.

== Early life and amateur career ==
Purcell was born in Dublin, where his father Joey became a club professional at Portmarnock Golf Club in 1991, after playing on the European Tour. As a 12-year-old, Purcell was Ireland's best tennis player in his age group, but switched focus to golf at 13.

Purcell had a successful amateur career and won the Men's Home Internationals with Ireland in 2016 and 2017, and the 2018 St Andrews Trophy with Great Britain and Ireland. In 2018, he was semi-finalist at The Amateur Championship, and runner-up at the Scottish Amateur Stroke Play Championship. In 2019, he was runner-up at the Irish Amateur Open Championship and become the first Irish winner of the Australian Amateur at Woodlands GC in Melbourne.

He enrolled at the University of North Carolina at Charlotte in 2016 and played two years with the Charlotte 49ers men's golf team, where he was Conference USA All-Freshman Team and Conference USA First Team selections.

== Professional career ==
Purcell turned professional in 2019 and joined the 2020 MENA Golf Tour, where he tied for 3rd at the Newgiza Open in Egypt. On the 2022 Alps Tour, he was runner-up at the Ein Bay Open, two strokes behind Stefano Mazzoli.

In 2021, Purcell joined the Challenge Tour where he was runner-up at the 2023 Dormy Open, before winning twice in 2024, including the Northern Ireland Open, to graduate to the 2025 European Tour.

== Amateur wins ==
- 2016 South of Ireland Amateur Open Championship
- 2019 Australian Amateur

== Professional wins (2) ==
=== Challenge Tour wins (2) ===
No.	Date	Tournament	Winning score	Margin of victory	Runner(s)-up
1	28 Jul 2024	Black Desert NI Open	−13 (66-65-65-71=267)	2 strokes	(Sweden) Joakim Lagergren
2	20 Oct 2024	Hangzhou Open^{1}	−18 (63-69-67-67=266)	1 stroke	(Spain) Ángel Ayora, (Finland) Oliver Lindell, (England) Jack Senior

^{1}Co-sanctioned by the China Tour

== Team appearances ==
Amateur

- Men's Home Internationals (representing Ireland): 2016 (winners), 2017 (winners), 2018, 2019
- St Andrews Trophy (representing Great Britain and Ireland): 2018 (winners)
- Eisenhower Trophy (representing Ireland): 2018
- European Amateur Team Championship (representing Ireland): 2019
- Walker Cup (representing Great Britain & Ireland): 2019

== See also ==
- 2024 Challenge Tour graduates
