= Charles Wang (golfer) =

Chinese golfer (born 1997)

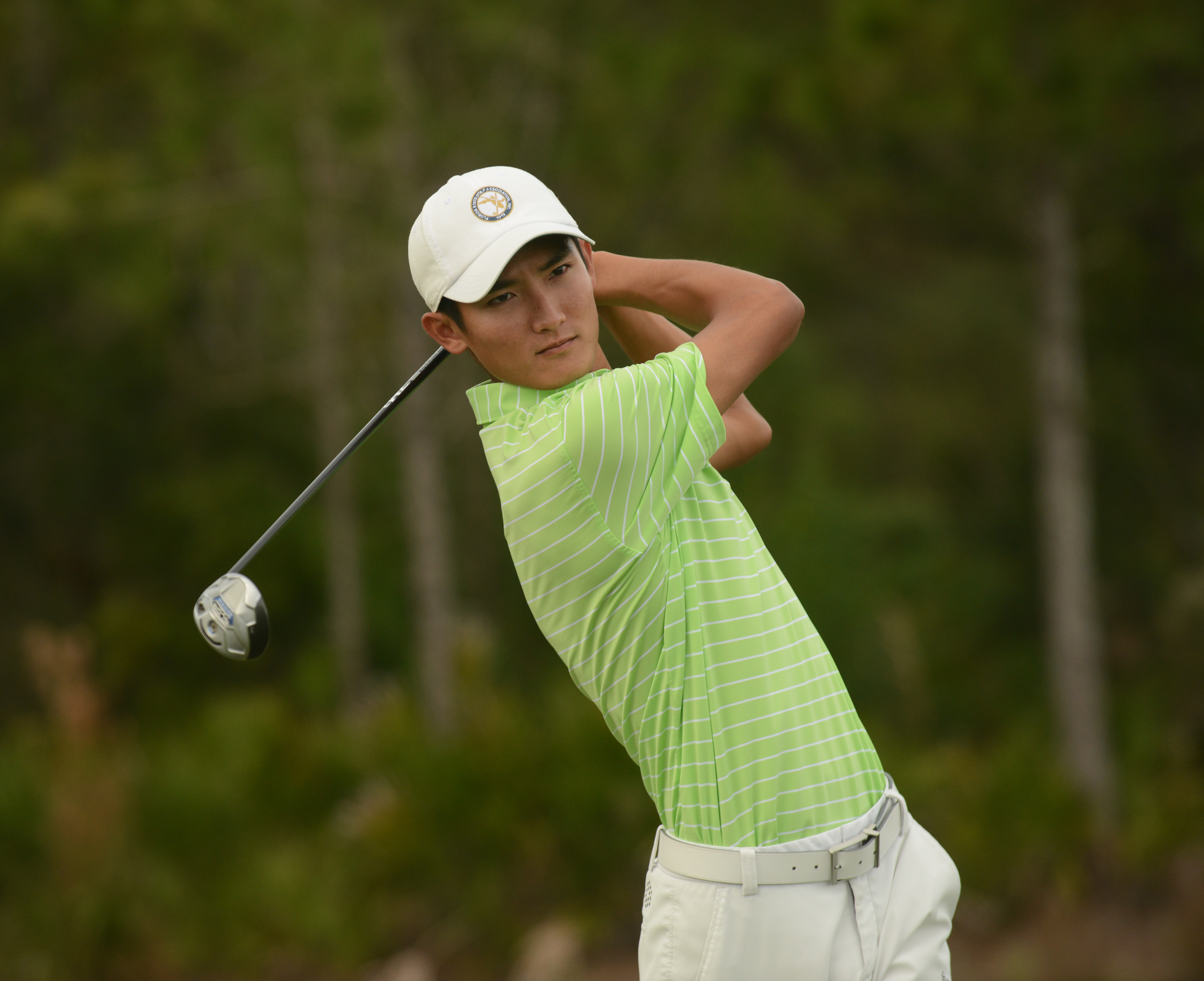
- Wang in 2015

Personal information
- Nationality: China
- Born: 4 February 1997 (age 29) Beijing, China
- Height: 5 ft 11 in (1.80 m)
- Weight: 145 lb (66 kg; 10.4 st)

Career
- Sport: Golf
- College: Northwestern University
- Turned professional: 2015
- Current tours: Asian Tour; China Tour
- Former tours: Web.com Tour; PGA Tour Canada; PGA Tour Americas
- Professional wins: 1

Wang Shouqian (Chinese: 王首谦; pinyin: Wáng Shǒuqiān, born 4 February 1997), known as Charles Wang in the west, is a Chinese professional golfer. In December 2015 at age 18, Wang qualified for the Web.com Tour through Q School. He had survived all three previous stages of Q School, and was the youngest player in the field at the final stage.

Wang was born in Beijing. At the age of six, he participated in his first junior tournament. In 2010, he came to the United States to attend Sarasota Christian School. He won the IMG Leadbetter Junior Championship in 2011.

Wang attended Northwestern University for the 2014–15 academic year and played on the golf team. He turned pro in the spring of 2015.

Wang is an accomplished violinist.

== Professional wins (1) ==
=== China Tour wins (1) ===
No.	Date	Tournament	Winning score	Margin of victory	Runner-up
1	29 Jun 2025	Guangdong Open	−26 (68-67-66-62=262)	4 strokes	(China) Zhou Yanhan
