= 2026 China Tour =

Golf tour season

2026 China Tour season
- Duration: 12 March 2026 – 6 December 2026
- Number of official events: 18 (Note: One further tournament was cancelled.)

The 2026 China Tour is the 12th season of the China Tour, the main professional golf tour in China since separating from PGA Tour China in 2017.

== Schedule ==
The following table lists official events during the 2026 season.

| Date | Tournament | Location | Purse (CN¥) | Winner (Note: The number in brackets after each winner's name is the number of China Tour events they had won up to and including that tournament.) | OWGR points | Other tours (Note: ADT − Asian Development Tour; ASA − Asian Tour; CHA − Challenge Tour; EUR − European Tour.) |
|---|---|---|---|---|---|---|
| 15 Mar | Guangdong Open | Guangdong | 1,000,000 | (China) Jin Zihao (6) | 1.81 | |
| 22 Mar | Hainan Classic | Hainan | US$2,550,000 | (United States) Jordan Gumberg (n/a) | 12.74 | EUR |
| 12 Apr | China Sports Lottery Chongqing Open | Chongqing | 1,000,000 | (Australia) Kuangyu Chen (1) | 2.19 | |
| 19 Apr | Lanting Shaoxing Open | Zhejiang | 1,500,000 | (China) Chai Bowen (1) | 2.08 | |
| 26 Apr | Volvo China Open | Shanghai | US$2,750,000 | (Austria) Bernd Wiesberger (n/a) | 14.85 | EUR |
| 17 May | Straits Cup Xiamen Open | Xiamen | 1,000,000 | (Singapore) Ryan Ang (1) | 1.37 | |
| 24 May | Hongyun Lang Nanjing Open | Jiangsu | 1,000,000 | (Hong Kong) Hak Shunyat (5) | 1.89 | |
| 7 Jun | Shanghai Open | Shanghai | 1,000,000 | (China) Peng Bo (1) | 1.67 | |
| 28 Jun | Bangkok Classic | Thailand | 1,500,000 | (Thailand) Sarit Suwannarut (2) | 3.74 | ADT |
| 30 Aug | Fanling Classic | Hong Kong | 1,000,000 | (Hong Kong) Isaac Lam (2) | 1.62 | |
| 13 Sep | Shaanxi Open | Shaanxi | 1,000,000 | (China) Peng Bo (2) | 1.76 | |
| 11 Oct | Hainan Open | Hainan | US$500,000 | (Netherlands) Lars van der Vight (n/a) | 7.45 | CHA |
| 18 Oct | Hangzhou Open | Zhejiang | US$500,000 | (Denmark) Hamish Brown (n/a) | 7.10 | CHA |
| ~~8 Nov~~ | International Series China | Shanghai | ~~US$2,000,000~~ | Cancelled | – | ASA (Note: Asian Tour International Series) |
| 15 Nov | AITO China Sports Lottery Match Play Championship | Chongqing | 1,200,000 | (China) Zhou Yanhan (12) | 1.66 | |
| 22 Nov | Hongyun Lang Chengdu Open | Chengdu | 1,500,000 | (China) Cao Shenshou (1) | 1.65 | |
| 6 Dec | China Tour Championship | TBC | 2,000,000 | | | |
