= Hangzhou Open (golf) =

Golf tournament in Hangzhou, China

Tournament information
- Location: Hangzhou, China
- Established: 2024
- Course: Hangzhou West Lake Golf Club
- Par: 72
- Length: 7,307 yards (6,682 m)
- Tours: Challenge Tour; China Tour
- Format: Stroke play
- Prize fund: US$500,000
- Month played: October

Tournament record score
- Aggregate: 266 Conor Purcell (2024)
- To par: −21 Hamish Brown (2026)

Current champion
- (Denmark) Hamish Brown

Location map
- Location in China

The Hangzhou Open is a golf tournament on the Challenge Tour, beginning in 2024, held at the Hangzhou West Lake Golf Club in Hangzhou, China.

== Winners ==
| Year | Tours (Note: CHA − Challenge Tour; CHN − China Tour.) | Winner | Score | To par | Margin of victory | Runner(s)-up | Ref. |
|---|---|---|---|---|---|---|---|
| 2026 | CHA, CHN | (Denmark) Hamish Brown | 267 | −21 | 1 stroke | (Denmark) Kristian Hjort Bressum | |
| 2025 | CHA, CHN | (Spain) Sebastián García Rodríguez | 271 | −17 | Playoff | (Peru) Julián Périco (Austria) Maximilian Steinlechner | |
| 2024 | CHA, CHN | (Republic of Ireland) Conor Purcell | 266 | −18 | 4 strokes | (Spain) Ángel Ayora (Finland) Oliver Lindell (England) Jack Senior | |
