= 2026 Asian Development Tour =

Golf tour season

2026 Asian Development Tour season
- Duration: 11 February 2026 – 1 October 2026
- Number of official events: 14 (Note: One further tournament was postponed.)
- Order of Merit: (Malaysia) Khavish Varadan

The 2026 Asian Development Tour was the 15th season of the Asian Development Tour, the official development tour to the Asian Tour.

== Schedule ==
The following table lists official events during the 2026 season.

Date	Tournament	Host country	Purse (US$)	Winner (Note: The number in brackets after each winner's name is the number of Asian Development Tour events they had won up to and including that tournament. It is rare for someone to accumulate many wins on the Asian Development Tour as success at this level usually leads to promotion to the Asian Tour.)	OWGR points	Other tours (Note: ATGT − All Thailand Golf Tour; CHN − China Tour; IGPL − Indian Golf Premier League; PGM − Professional Golf of Malaysia Tour; THAPGA − Thailand PGA Tour; TWN − Taiwan PGA Tour; VGA − VGA Tour.)
14 Feb	PKNS Selangor Masters	Malaysia	175,000	(Singapore) Nicklaus Chiam (1)	3.36	PGM
19 Mar	Nam A Bank Vietnam Masters	Vietnam	100,000	(Malaysia) Khavish Varadan (1)	2.01	VGA
25 Apr	Singha-SAT ADT Hua Hin Championship	Thailand	฿3,000,000	(Thailand) Amarin Kraivixien (1)	2.52	THAPGA
9 May	ADT Players Championship	Malaysia	110,000	(India) Pukhraj Singh Gill (1)	1.84	PGM
31 May	Am Green IGPL Morocco Rising Stars	Morocco	160,000	(Thailand) Tanapat Pichaikool (3)	2.59	IGPL
20 Jun	DigiPlus Philippine ADT Open	Philippines	100,000	(Italy) Michele Ortolani (1)	1.70	
28 Jun	Bangkok Classic	Thailand	CN¥1,500,000	(Thailand) Sarit Suwannarut (1)	3.74	CHN
10 Jul	Ever Glory ADT Open	Taiwan	100,000	(United States) Nathan Han (1)	2.43	TWN
17 Jul	Ambassador ADT Open	Taiwan	120,000	(Taiwan) Hung Chien-yao (3)	3.56	TWN
24 Jul	HCT ADT Open	Taiwan	120,000	(Taiwan) Lu Wei-chih (1)	3.74	TWN
21 Aug	Indonesia Pro-Am	Indonesia	125,000	(China) Andi Xu (1)	2.14	
29 Aug	Ciputra Golfpreneur Tournament	Indonesia	150,000	(Indonesia) Kevin Akbar (2)	3.07	
26 Sep	Egypt Golf Series 13	Egypt	125,000	(Philippines) Sean Ramos (1)	1.47	
1 Oct	Egypt Golf Series 14	Egypt	125,000	(England) Ben Jones (1)	1.62	
~~28 Nov~~	Aramco Invitational Tournament	Saudi Arabia	~~275,000~~	Postponed (Note: Postponed due to the 2026 Iran war.)	–	

== Order of Merit ==
The Order of Merit was based on prize money won during the season, calculated in U.S. dollars. The top 10 players on the Order of Merit earned status to play on the 2027 Asian Tour.

Position	Player	Prize money ($)
1	(Malaysia) Khavish Varadan	64,884
2	(South Korea) Yang Min-hyeok	59,794
3	(Philippines) Sean Ramos	54,719
4	(Italy) Michele Ortolani	51,161
5	(Thailand) Runchanapong Youprayong	49,280
6	(India) Pukhraj Singh Gill	42,690
7	(Singapore) Nicklaus Chiam	40,022
8	(China) Andi Xu	36,109
9	(Indonesia) Kevin Akbar	35,106
10	(United States) Nathan Han	34,198
