= 2024 Professional Golf Tour of India =

Golf tour season

2024 Professional Golf Tour of India season
- Duration: 13 February 2024 – 22 December 2024
- Number of official events: 22
- Most wins: (India) Shaurya Binu (2) (India) Veer Ahlawat (2)
- Order of Merit: (India) Veer Ahlawat

The 2024 Professional Golf Tour of India, titled as the 2024 Tata Steel Professional Golf Tour of India for sponsorship reasons, was the 17th season of the Professional Golf Tour of India, the main professional golf tour in India since it was formed in 2006.

== Schedule ==
The following table lists official events during the 2024 season.

Date	Tournament	Location	Purse (₹)	Winner (Note: The number in brackets after each winner's name is the number of Professional Golf Tour of India events they had won up to and including that tournament.)	OWGR points	Other tours (Note: CHA − Challenge Tour; EST − European Senior Tour; EUR − European Tour.)
16 Feb	Tata Steel PGTI Players Championship (Tollygunge)	West Bengal	10,000,000	(India) Manu Gandas (8)	0.77	
24 Feb	Vooty Masters	Telangana	10,000,000	(India) Shaurya Binu (1)	0.79	
9 Mar	Gujarat Open Golf Championship	Gujarat	10,000,000	(India) Abhinav Lohan (2)	0.74	
17 Mar	Delhi Challenge	Gujarat	US$300,000	(England) John Parry (n/a)	5.34	CHA
24 Mar	Kolkata Challenge	West Bengal	US$300,000	(Denmark) Rasmus Neergaard-Petersen (n/a)	5.66	CHA
31 Mar	Hero Indian Open	Haryana	US$2,250,000	(Japan) Keita Nakajima (n/a)	15.83	EUR
6 Apr	Chandigarh Open	Haryana	10,000,000	(India) Gaganjeet Bhullar (14)	1.38	
13 Apr	Delhi-NCR Open	Uttar Pradesh	10,000,000	(India) Veer Ahlawat (3)	1.02	
19 Apr	Gurgaon Open	Haryana	10,000,000	(India) M. Dharma (3)	0.80	
11 Aug	Mysuru Open	Karnataka	10,000,000	(India) Shaurya Binu (2)	0.77	
17 Aug	Coimbatore Open	Tamil Nadu	10,000,000	(India) Rayhan Thomas (1)	0.97	
23 Aug	Chennai Pro Championship	Tamil Nadu	5,000,000	(India) Dhruv Sheoran (1)	0.80	
1 Sep	HSBC India Legends Championship	Uttar Pradesh	US$500,000	(Sweden) Joakim Haeggman (n/a)	n/a	EST
29 Sep	Telangana Golconda Masters	Telangana	10,000,000	(India) Shankar Das (8)	0.73	
5 Oct	Vizag Open	Andhra Pradesh	10,000,000	(India) Angad Cheema (2)	0.90	
20 Oct	Haryana Open	Haryana	10,000,000	(India) Varun Parikh (2)	0.82	
26 Oct	J&K Open	Jammu and Kashmir	5,000,000	(India) Shaurya Bhattacharya (1)	0.51	
9 Nov	Poona Club Open	Maharashtra	10,000,000	(India) Kshitij Naveed Kaul (4)	0.71	
16 Nov	Jaipur Open	Rajasthan	10,000,000	(India) Sachin Baisoya (3)	0.70	
23 Nov	IndianOil Servo Masters Golf	Assam	8,500,000	(Bangladesh) Jamal Hossain (2)	0.53	
13 Dec	Vishwa Samudra Open	Delhi	20,000,000	(India) Ajeetesh Sandhu (5)	1.04	
22 Dec	Tata Steel Tour Championship	Jharkhand	30,000,000	(India) Veer Ahlawat (4)	0.89	

== Order of Merit ==
The Order of Merit was titled as the Tata Steel PGTI Rankings and was based on prize money won during the season, calculated in Indian rupees. The leading player on the Order of Merit earned status to play on the 2025 European Tour (DP World Tour).

Position	Player	Prize money (₹)	Status earned
1	(India) Veer Ahlawat	15,635,724	Promoted to European Tour
2	(India) Rahil Gangjee	6,921,582	
3	(India) Manu Gandas	6,715,105	
4	(India) Angad Cheema	6,548,267	
5	(India) Sachin Baisoya	6,528,213	
