= Abu Dhabi Challenge =

Tournament information
- Location: Al Ain, United Arab Emirates
- Established: 2023
- Course: Al Ain Golf Club
- Par: 70
- Length: 7,117 yards (6,508 m)
- Tour: Challenge Tour
- Format: Stroke play
- Prize fund: US$350,000
- Month played: September/October

Tournament record score
- Aggregate: 256 Garrick Porteous (2024)
- To par: −24 as above

Current champion
- (Republic of Ireland) Liam Nolan

Location map
- Location in the United Arab Emirates

The Abu Dhabi Challenge is a golf tournament on the Challenge Tour, Europe's second tier men's professional golf tour, held in Abu Dhabi, United Arab Emirates.

First played in 2023, the event is held back-to-back with the UAE Challenge, also played in Abu Dhabi. The inaugural event was held at Abu Dhabi Golf Club and won by Ricardo Gouveia of Portugal.

In 2024, it was moved to Al Ain Equestrian, Shooting & Golf Club. Dubai-based Garrick Porteous won by a stroke ahead of five-time European Tour winner Alexander Lévy.

== Winners ==
| Year | Winner | Score | To par | Margin of victory | Runner(s)-up | Venue |
|---|---|---|---|---|---|---|
| 2026 | (Republic of Ireland) Liam Nolan | 259 | −21 | 4 strokes | (Finland) Tapio Pulkkanen | Al Ain GC |
| 2025 | (Italy) Renato Paratore | 263 | −17 | 1 stroke | (Spain) Sebastián García Rodríguez (Scotland) David Law | Al Ain GC |
| 2024 | (England) Garrick Porteous | 256 | −24 | 1 stroke | (France) Alexander Lévy | Al Ain GC |
| 2023 | (Portugal) Ricardo Gouveia | 272 | −16 | 3 strokes | (Spain) Iván Cantero (England) Joshua Grenville-Wood (England) Tom Lewis (South Africa) Wilco Nienaber | Abu Dhabi GC |
