= Swiss Challenge =

Golf tournament

Tournament information
- Location: Lucerne, Switzerland
- Established: 2000
- Course: Golf Sempach
- Par: 71
- Length: 7,161 yards (6,548 m)
- Tour: Challenge Tour
- Format: Stroke play
- Prize fund: €300,000
- Month played: June

Tournament record score
- Aggregate: 261 Matthew Southgate (2026)
- To par: −25 Rafa Cabrera-Bello (2008) −25 Marcus Helligkilde (2021)

Current champion
- (England) Matthew Southgate

Final champion
- Location in Switzerland

The Swiss Challenge is a golf tournament on the Challenge Tour, which was held in Switzerland until 2021. Since then it has since been held in France.

== History ==
It was first played as the Credit Suisse Private Banking Open in 2000 and 2001 at the Golf Club Patriziale Ascona in Ascona. It replaced the Interlaken Open which ended after financial issues. During the course of the 2002 edition, the heavy rain led to the overflow of the Lake Maggiore and to the cancellation of the event.

Following a four-year hiatus, the tournament returned in 2006 and was held at the Wylihof Golf Club in Luterbach through 2009. Since 2010 the event has been played at Golf Sempachersee in Hildisrieden.

Between 2021 and 2024, the event has uniquely been held in France and been played at Golf Saint Apollinaire in Folgensbourg, close to the Swiss border. In round 2 of the 2021 event, Alejandro del Rey shot the first ever round of 58 on any tour in Europe. It was also the lowest round to-par (−14) on any major tour in world golf.

== Winners ==
Year	Winner	Score	To par	Margin of victory	Runner(s)-up	Venue
Swiss Challenge
2026	(England) Matthew Southgate	261	−23	8 strokes	(England) George Bloor (Denmark) Hamish Brown (Peru) Julián Périco (England) Tom Sloman (Slovakia) Tadeáš Teťák (South Africa) Martin Vorster (Scotland) Marc Warren	Sempach
2025	(France) Félix Mory	272	−12	Playoff	(Spain) Santiago Tarrío	Sempach
2024	(Scotland) Euan Walker	135 (Note: Shortened to 36 holes due to weather.)	−9	3 strokes	(England) Bradley Bawden (Norway) Kristoffer Reitan	Saint Apollinaire
2023	(Sweden) Adam Blommé	271	−17	Playoff	(Sweden) Jesper Svensson	Saint Apollinaire
2022	(New Zealand) Daniel Hillier	274	−14	2 strokes	(France) Jeong-Weon Ko	Saint Apollinaire
2021	(Denmark) Marcus Helligkilde	263	−25	1 stroke	(Denmark) Nicolai Kristensen (England) Jonathan Thomson	Saint Apollinaire
2020	Cancelled due to the COVID-19 pandemic					
2019	(Portugal) Ricardo Santos	269	−15	1 stroke	(England) Richard Bland (Germany) Moritz Lampert	Sempachersee
2018	(Germany) Marcel Schneider	262	−22	6 strokes	(Norway) Kristian Krogh Johannessen	Sempachersee
2017	(Switzerland) Joel Girrbach	267	−17	2 strokes	(Scotland) Craig Lee	Sempachersee
2016	(Germany) Alexander Knappe	272	−12	1 stroke	(England) Paul Howard (Norway) Espen Kofstad	Sempachersee
2015	(United States) Daniel Im	273	−11	Playoff	(England) Gary Boyd	Sempachersee
2014	(Belgium) Pierre Relecom	269	−15	1 stroke	(Italy) Niccolo Quintarelli	Sempachersee
2013	(France) Victor Riu	265	−19	3 strokes	(England) Adam Gee (United States) Brinson Paolini	Sempachersee
Credit Suisse Challenge
2012	(France) Gary Stal	273	−11	Playoff	(France) Alexandre Kaleka	Sempachersee
2011	(France) Benjamin Hébert	272	−12	4 strokes	(England) Jamie Moul	Sempachersee
2010	(Italy) Alessandro Tadini	266	−22	1 stroke	(Wales) Stuart Manley (Norway) Marius Thorp	Sempachersee
2009	(England) Peter Baker (2)	274	−18	1 stroke	(Austria) Florian Praegant	Wylihof
2008	(Spain) Rafa Cabrera-Bello	267	−25	2 strokes	(England) Gary Lockerbie	Wylihof
2007	(England) Peter Baker	272	−20	1 stroke	(Scotland) Andrew McArthur	Wylihof
2006	(Spain) Francisco Cea	276	−16	Playoff	(England) Tim Milford	Wylihof
Credit Suisse Private Banking Open
2003–2005: No tournament
2002	Tournament abandoned due to severe weather					
2001	(Scotland) Greig Hutcheon	266	−18	1 stroke	(Spain) Jesús María Arruti (Germany) Kariem Baraka	Patriziale
2000	(Spain) Álvaro Salto	268	−16	1 stroke	(Italy) Michele Reale	Patriziale
