= 2025 Challenge Tour graduates =

This is a list of players who graduated from the Challenge Tour in 2025. The top 20 players on the Challenge Tour points list graduated to the European Tour for the 2026 season.

		2025 Challenge Tour		2026 European Tour				
	Player	Points rank	Points	Starts	Cuts made	Best finish	Money list rank	Earnings (€)
(South Africa)	J. C. Ritchie	1	1,674					
(Scotland)	David Law	2	1,494					
(Austria)	Maximilian Steinlechner*	3	1,477					
(Italy)	Renato Paratore	4	1,427					
(France)	Oïhan Guillamoundeguy*	5	1,292					
(England)	James Morrison	6	1,100					
(Italy)	Filippo Celli	7	1,090					
(Italy)	Stefano Mazzoli*	8	1,077					
(South Africa)	Daniel van Tonder	9	1,053					
(Spain)	Sebastián García Rodríguez	10	1,040					
(Scotland)	Daniel Young^{†}	11	1,040					
(France)	Félix Mory*	12	1,032					
(England)	Joshua Berry	13	1,022					
(Scotland)	Euan Walker^{†}	14	886					
(Spain)	Quim Vidal*	15	826					
(Sweden)	Hugo Townsend*	16	794					
(Sweden)	Tobias Jonsson*	17	775					
(Spain)	Rocco Repetto*	18	756					
(France)	Clément Charmasson*	19	704					
(Sweden)	Albin Bergström*	20	683					

*European Tour rookie in 2026
^{†}First-time full member, but ineligible for Rookie of the Year award

== Wins on the European Tour in 2026 ==
No.	Date	Player	Tournament	Winning score	Margin of victory	Runners-up
1	19 Jul 2026	(Italy) Stefano Mazzoli	Corales Puntacana Championship	−20 (67-69-66-66=268)	1 stroke	(England) Todd Clements, (United States) Gordon Sargent

== See also ==
- 2025 European Tour Qualifying School graduates
