= Charles Wang (disambiguation) =

Charles Wang (1944–2018) was a Chinese-American billionaire, businessman, and philanthropist.

Charles Wang may also refer to:

- Charles Wang (golfer) (born 1997), Chinese professional golfer
- Charles Wang (physician), Chinese physician and lawyer
- Charlie Wang, lawyer and CEO of car companies
- Charles B. Wang Community Health Center, New York City nonprofit organization, founded 1971
