= Foshan Open =

Tournament information
- Location: Foshan, China
- Established: 2013
- Course: Foshan Golf Club
- Par: 72
- Length: 7,148 yards (6,536 m)
- Tours: Challenge Tour; China Tour
- Format: Stroke play
- Prize fund: US$500,000
- Month played: October

Tournament record score
- Aggregate: 265 Bai Zhengkai (2019)
- To par: −23 as above

Current champion
- (China) Bai Zhengkai

Final champion
- Location in China

The Foshan Open is a golf tournament on the Challenge Tour. It was played for the first time in October 2013 at the Foshan Golf Club in Foshan, China. It is co-sanctioned by the China Golf Association. Since 2017, it has been part of the China Tour.

Nacho Elvira of Spain won the inaugural event.

== Winners ==
Year	Tour(s) (Note: CHA − Challenge Tour; CHN − China Tour.)	Winner	Score	To par	Margin of victory	Runner(s)-up
2022	CHA, CHN	Cancelled due to the COVID-19 pandemic				
2021	CHA, CHN	Cancelled due to the COVID-19 pandemic				
2020	CHA, CHN	Cancelled due to the COVID-19 pandemic				
2019	CHA, CHN	(China) Bai Zhengkai	265	−23	4 strokes	(China) Dou Zecheng
2018	CHA, CHN	(France) Victor Perez	269	−19	Playoff	(Scotland) Robert MacIntyre
2017	CHA, CHN	(Wales) Oliver Farr	270	−18	5 strokes	(Germany) Sebastian Heisele
2016	CHA	(England) Marcus Armitage	269	−19	1 stroke	(Germany) Alexander Knappe (France) Matthieu Pavon
2015	CHA	(Spain) Borja Virto	273	−15	2 strokes	(Sweden) Björn Åkesson
2014	CHA	(England) Jason Palmer	272	−16	1 stroke	(England) Ben Evans
2013	CHA	(Spain) Nacho Elvira	274	−14	1 stroke	(England) Tyrrell Hatton (India) Shiv Kapur (England) Sam Walker
