= Jonathan Gøth-Rasmussen =

Danish professional golfer (born 1998)

Personal information
- Nationality: Denmark
- Born: 22 May 1998 (age 28) Helsingør, Denmark
- Height: 6 ft 4 in (193 cm)
- Weight: 170 lb (77 kg)

Career
- Sport: Golf
- College: Coastal Carolina University
- Turned professional: 2023
- Current tour: Challenge Tour
- Former tours: European Tour; Nordic Golf League
- Professional wins: 3

Number of wins by tour
- Challenge Tour: 2
- Other: 1

Jonathan Gøth-Rasmussen (born 22 May 1998) is a Danish professional golfer who has played on the European Tour and the Challenge Tour, where he has recorded two wins.

== Amateur career ==
Gøth-Rasmussen won the 2016 Danish National Junior Championship and lost the final 3&2 at the 2015 French International Boys Championship. Representing the Danish National Team he played in the 2015 European Boys' Team Championship in Austria, and the 2016 European Amateur Team Championship at Golf de Chantilly, outside Paris, France, where his team captured the bronze medal. In 2016, he also played for Europe in the Junior Ryder Cup, and on the victorious Jacques Léglise Trophy team.

Gøth-Rasmussen played college golf at Coastal Carolina University 2017–2018 with the Coastal Carolina Chanticleers men's golf team.

== Professional career ==
Gøth-Rasmussen turned professional in 2020 and joined the Nordic Golf League, where he recorded his first victory at The No. 1 Tour Final in Golf in 2023.

He earned his European Tour card for 2024 through Q-School. In his rookie season he made 12 European Tour starts and 26 Challenge Tour starts, securing a victory at Challenge de Cádiz. The following year he won his second title at the Danish Golf Challenge.

== Personal life ==
Gøth-Rasmussen is the son of Jacob Rasmussen, winner of the Torneo RCG de Sevilla on the 1993 Challenge Tour.

== Amateur wins ==
- 2014 Kronborg Masters
- 2015 The Royal Trophy
- 2016 Danish National Junior Championship

== Professional wins (3) ==
=== Challenge Tour wins (2) ===
No.	Date	Tournament	Winning score	Margin of victory	Runner-up
1	9 Jun 2024	Challenge de Cádiz	−15 (69-69-66-69=273)	1 stroke	(Republic of Ireland) Gary Hurley
2	25 May 2025	Danish Golf Challenge	−19 (66-70-66-67=269)	1 stroke	(Scotland) Calum Fyfe

=== Nordic Golf League wins (1) ===
No.	Date	Tournament	Winning score	Margin of victory	Runner-up
1	13 Oct 2023	The No. 1 Tour Final in Golf	−3 (68-76-69=213)	2 strokes	(Iceland) Axel Bóasson

== Team appearances ==
Amateur

- European Boys' Team Championship (representing Denmark): 2015
- European Amateur Team Championship (representing Denmark): 2016
- Jacques Léglise Trophy (representing the Continent of Europe): 2016 (winners)
- Junior Ryder Cup (representing Europe): 2016

== See also ==
- 2023 European Tour Qualifying School graduates
