= Mediclinic Invitational =

Tournament information
- Location: Sasolburg, Free State, South Africa
- Established: 2023
- Course: Heron Banks Resort
- Par: 71
- Length: 7,229 yards (6,610 m)
- Tour: Sunshine Tour
- Format: Stroke play
- Prize fund: R 2,000,000
- Month played: January

Tournament record score
- Aggregate: 260 Maximilian Steinlechner (2025)
- To par: −25 Stefan Wears-Taylor (2023) −25 Ryan van Velzen (2024)

Current champion
- (South Africa) Samuel Simpson

Location map
- Location in South Africa Location in Free State

The Mediclinic Invitational is a golf tournament on the Sunshine Tour. It had been played annually since 2023.

== History ==
The inaugural tournament was held at Centurion Country Club in Centurion, Gauteng. In 2024, it moved to Maccauvlei Golf Club, a course with links-like characteristics situated on the riverfront of the Vaal River, right on the border of the Free State and Gauteng provinces. In 2025, the tournament moved a few kilometers to Heron Banks Golf Course, a par-71 links-style course on the same riverfront.

== Winners ==
Year	Winner	Score	To par	Margin of victory	Runner-up	Venue
2026	(South Africa) Samuel Simpson	265	−19	3 strokes	(Australia) Austin Bautista (South Africa) Simon du Plooy	Heron Banks
2025	(Austria) Maximilian Steinlechner	260	−24	1 stroke	(South Africa) Daniel van Tonder	Heron Banks
2024	(South Africa) Ryan van Velzen	263	−25	4 strokes	(South Africa) Neil Schietekat	Maccauvlei GC
2023	(South Africa) Stefan Wears-Taylor	263	−25	1 stroke	(South Africa) Jake Redman	Centurion CC
