= Maximilian Steinlechner =

Austrian professional golfer (born 1999)

Personal information
- Nationality: Austria
- Born: 22 November 1999 (age 26) Innsbruck, Austria

Career
- Sport: Golf
- College: North Carolina State University
- Turned professional: 2023
- Current tour: European Tour
- Former tours: Sunshine Tour; Challenge Tour; Alps Tour
- Professional wins: 3

Number of wins by tour
- Sunshine Tour: 1
- Challenge Tour: 1
- Other: 1

Maximilian Steinlechner (born 22 November 1999) is an Austrian professional golfer and Challenge Tour player. He won the Mediclinic Invitational on the 2024–25 Sunshine Tour.

== Early life and amateur career ==
Steinlechner was born in Innsbruck and became the number one ranked amateur in Austria after he won the Austrian Boys Stroke Play Championship three consecutive years between 2015 and 2017. In 2017, he also won both the Austrian Stroke Play Championship and the Austrian International Amateur. He tied for 3rd at the 2019 European Amateur behind Matthias Schmid and Euan Walker.

He was a member of the National Team and played for Austria at the European Boys' Team Championship, the European Amateur Team Championship and the Eisenhower Trophy, and represented the Continent of Europe at the 2022 St Andrews Trophy.

Steinlechner attended North Carolina State University between 2019 and 2023. He played golf with the NC State Wolfpack men's golf team and was named Honorable Mention All-American, and to the All-Region and All-ACC teams.

== Professional career ==
Steinlechner turned professional in June 2023 and joined the Challenge Tour, where his best finish in his rookie campaign was a tie for fifth at the Vierumäki Finnish Challenge.

In 2024, he tied for 3rd at the Euram Bank Open, and also made a few starts on the Alps Tour, where he was runner-up at the Alps de Las Castillas and won the Gösser Open.

In January 2025, he birdied the final hole to win the Mediclinic Invitational on the Sunshine Tour, one stroke ahead of Daniel van Tonder.

== Amateur wins ==
- 2015 Austrian Boys Stroke Play Championship
- 2016 Austrian Boys Stroke Play Championship
- 2017 Austrian Boys Stroke Play Championship, Austrian Stroke Play Championship, Austrian International Amateur

== Professional wins (3) ==
=== Sunshine Tour wins (1) ===
No.	Date	Tournament	Winning score	Margin of victory	Runner-up
1	19 Jan 2025	Mediclinic Invitational	−24 (64-65-65-66=260)	1 stroke	(South Africa) Daniel van Tonder

=== Challenge Tour wins (1) ===
No.	Date	Tournament	Winning score	Margin of victory	Runner-up
1	6 Jul 2025	Interwetten Open	−21 (64-61-66-64=255)	2 strokes	(Italy) Filippo Celli

Challenge Tour playoff record (0–2)

No.	Year	Tournament	Opponent(s)	Result
1	2025	Hainan Open	(Italy) Renato Paratore	Lost to par on first extra hole
2	2025	Hangzhou Open	(Spain) Sebastián García Rodríguez, (Peru) Julián Périco	García won with par on second extra hole Steinlechner eliminated by par on first hole

=== Alps Tour wins (1) ===
No.	Date	Tournament	Winning score	Margin of victory	Runner-up
1	19 May 2024	Gösser Open	−15 (64-69-68=201)	Playoff	(Spain) Asier Aguirre Izcue

== Team appearances ==
Amateur

- European Boys' Team Championship (representing Austria): 2016, 2017
- European Amateur Team Championship (representing Austria): 2018, 2019, 2021, 2022
- Eisenhower Trophy (representing Austria): 2018, 2022
- St Andrews Trophy (representing the Continent of Europe): 2022

== See also ==
- 2025 Challenge Tour graduates
