= M. J. Daffue =

South African professional golfer (born 1989)

Personal information
- Full name: Matthys Johannes Daffue
- Nationality: South Africa
- Born: 13 January 1989 (age 37) Pretoria, South Africa
- Height: 6 ft 2 in (188 cm)
- Weight: 210 lb (95 kg)
- Spouse: Kamila
- Children: 1

Career
- Sport: Golf
- College: Lee University; Lamar University
- Turned professional: 2012
- Current tours: European Tour; Sunshine Tour
- Former tours: PGA Tour; Korn Ferry Tour; Challenge Tour
- Professional wins: 3

Number of wins by tour
- Sunshine Tour: 1
- Challenge Tour: 2
- Other: 1

Best results in major championships
- Masters Tournament: DNP
- PGA Championship: DNP
- U.S. Open: T31: 2022
- The Open Championship: T71: 2026

Matthys Johannes Daffue (born 13 January 1989) is a South African professional golfer on the Challenge Tour. He earned enough points on the Korn Ferry Tour in 2022 to qualify for the PGA Tour in 2022–23.

== College career ==
Born in Pretoria, South Africa, Daffue started his college golf career at Lee University before transferring to Lamar University, where he played his final three years. At Lamar, he won five tournaments, including the 2011 and 2012 Southland Conference Championships. He was an National Association of Intercollegiate Athletics All-American and the 2011 Southland Conference player of the year.

== Professional career ==
Daffue played his first Korn Ferry Tour event in 2019. In the 2021–22 season, Daffue successfully Monday qualified for six PGA Tour events. In 2022, he qualified for the U.S. Open by winning the final qualifying tournament, and took the lead in the second round.

== Personal life ==
Daffue lives in Kingwood, Texas with wife Kamila and son. In 2014, Kamila's mother was struck by a car and killed. He has also worked as a volunteer assistant for the University of Houston golf team.

== Professional wins (3) ==
=== Sunshine Tour wins (1) ===
No.	Date	Tournament	Winning score	Margin of victory	Runners-up
1	15 Feb 2026	NTT Data Pro-Am^{1}	−16 (67-64-69=200) (Note: Shortened to 54 holes due to weather.)	4 strokes	(South Africa) Bryce Easton, (Republic of Ireland) Max Kennedy, (United States) Hunter Logan, (Zimbabwe) Kieran Vincent

^{1}Co-sanctioned by the Challenge Tour

=== Challenge Tour wins (2) ===
No.	Date	Tournament	Winning score	Margin of victory	Runners-up
1	15 Feb 2026	NTT Data Pro-Am^{1}	−16 (67-64-69=200)	4 strokes	(South Africa) Bryce Easton, (Republic of Ireland) Max Kennedy, (United States) Hunter Logan, (Zimbabwe) Kieran Vincent
2	22 Mar 2026	DP World PGTI Open^{2}	−21 (70-61-67-69=267)	1 stroke	(United States) Jhared Hack, (India) Saptak Talwar

^{1}Co-sanctioned by the Sunshine Tour
^{2}Co-sanctioned by the Professional Golf Tour of India

=== NGA Pro Golf Tour wins (1) ===
- 2013 NeSmith Chevrolet Classic

== Playoff record ==
Korn Ferry Tour playoff record (0–1)

No.	Year	Tournament	Opponents	Result
1	2022	Albertsons Boise Open	(United States) Will Gordon, (United States) Philip Knowles	Gordon won with par on first extra hole

== Results in major championships ==
Tournament	2022	2023	2024	2025	2026
Masters Tournament					
PGA Championship					
U.S. Open	T31				
The Open Championship					T71

Did not play

"T" = tied

== See also ==
- 2022 Korn Ferry Tour Finals graduates
- 2026 Challenge Tour graduates
