= UAE Challenge =

Tournament information
- Location: Ajman, United Arab Emirates
- Established: 2023
- Courses: Al Zorah Golf & Yacht Club
- Par: 72
- Length: 7,229 yards (6,610 m)
- Tour: Challenge Tour
- Format: Stroke play
- Prize fund: US$300,000
- Month played: April

Tournament record score
- Aggregate: 266 Renato Paratore (2025)
- To par: −22 as above

Current champion
- (Italy) Renato Paratore

Location map
- Location in the United Arab Emirates

The UAE Challenge is a golf tournament on the Challenge Tour, Europe's second tier men's professional golf tour, held in Abu Dhabi, United Arab Emirates.

First played in 2023, the event was held at the Gary Player-designed Saadiyat Beach Golf Club. It is played back-to-back with the Abu Dhabi Challenge, with 30 spots allocated to the Emirates Golf Federation for each event. In 2024, through winning the Al Hamra Men's Amateur Open, 17 year-old amateur Oscar Craig received a spot and made the cut with stepfather Tommy Fleetwood as his caddie.

== Winners ==
Year	Winner	Score	To par	Margin of victory	Runner-up
RAKBANK UAE Challenge
2026	Cancelled				
UAE Challenge
2025	(Italy) Renato Paratore	266	−22	2 strokes	(South Africa) J. C. Ritchie
2024	(Denmark) Rasmus Neergaard-Petersen	274	−14	1 stroke	(South Africa) Wilco Nienaber
2023	(Germany) Max Rottluff	274	−14	1 stroke	(France) Ugo Coussaud
