= Rosa Challenge Tour =

Tournament information
- Location: Konopiska, Poland
- Established: 2024
- Course: Rosa Golf Club
- Par: 70
- Length: 7,017 yards (6,416 m)
- Tour: Challenge Tour
- Format: Stroke play
- Prize fund: €300,000
- Month played: September

Tournament record score
- Aggregate: 265 Hugo Townsend (2025)
- To par: −15 as above

Current champion
- (England) John Gough

Location map
- Location in the Poland

The Rosa Challenge Tour is a golf tournament on the Challenge Tour, Europe's second tier men's professional golf tour, held in Konopiska, Poland.

== History ==
The inaugural tournament in 2024 marked the Challenge Tour's return to Poland after 15 years and was the seventh Challenge Tour event played in Poland, which most recently hosted the DHL Wroclaw Open in 2009. Spain's Ángel Ayora won the tournament as Dermot McElroy secured solo second.

== Winners ==
Year	Winner	Score	To par	Margin of victory	Runner-up
Rosa Challenge Tour
2026	(England) John Gough	268	−12	1 stroke	(England) Andrew Wilson
GAC Rosa Challenge Tour
2025	(Sweden) Hugo Townsend	265	−15	2 strokes	(Germany) Anton Albers
Rosa Challenge Tour
2024	(Spain) Ángel Ayora	267	−13	3 strokes	(Northern Ireland) Dermot McElroy

== See also ==
- Polish Open
