= 2024 Challenge Tour =

Golf tour season

2024 Challenge Tour season
- Duration: 1 February 2024 – 3 November 2024
- Number of official events: 29
- Most wins: (Denmark) Rasmus Neergaard-Petersen (3) (England) John Parry (3)
- Rankings: (Denmark) Rasmus Neergaard-Petersen

The 2024 Challenge Tour was the 36th season of the Challenge Tour, the official development tour to the European Tour.

== Schedule ==
The following table lists official events during the 2024 season.

Date	Tournament	Host country	Purse (€)	Winner (Note: The number in brackets after each winner's name is the number of Challenge Tour events they had won up to and including that tournament. This information is only shown for Challenge Tour members. It is rare for someone to accumulate many wins on the Challenge Tour as success at this level usually leads to promotion to the European Tour.)	OWGR points	Other tours (Note: AFR − Sunshine Tour; CHN − China Tour; PGTI − Professional Golf Tour of India.)	Notes
4 Feb	SDC Open	South Africa	US$350,000	(Wales) Rhys Enoch (2)	5.89	AFR	
11 Feb	Bain's Whisky Cape Town Open	South Africa	US$350,000	(Sweden) Mikael Lindberg (2)	6.40	AFR	
18 Feb	Dimension Data Pro-Am	South Africa	R7,000,000	(France) David Ravetto (1)	7.35	AFR	Pro-Am
25 Feb	NMB Championship	South Africa	US$350,000	(Sweden) Björn Åkesson (1)	5.49	AFR	
17 Mar	Delhi Challenge	India	US$300,000	(England) John Parry (2)	5.34	PGTI	New tournament
24 Mar	Kolkata Challenge	India	US$300,000	(Denmark) Rasmus Neergaard-Petersen (1)	5.66	PGTI	New tournament
21 Apr	Abu Dhabi Challenge	UAE	US$300,000	(England) Garrick Porteous (2)	6.81		
28 Apr	UAE Challenge	UAE	US$300,000	(Denmark) Rasmus Neergaard-Petersen (2)	6.86		
12 May	Challenge de España	Spain	270,000	(Spain) Joel Moscatel (1)	6.30		
26 May	Danish Golf Challenge	Denmark	270,000	(Norway) Andreas Halvorsen (1)	6.19		
9 Jun	Challenge de Cádiz	Spain	270,000	(Denmark) Jonathan Gøth-Rasmussen (1)	6.03		
16 Jun	Kaskáda Golf Challenge	Czech Republic	270,000	(Denmark) Hamish Brown (1)	5.71		
23 Jun	Blot Open de Bretagne	France	270,000	(England) John Parry (3)	5.34		
30 Jun	Le Vaudreuil Golf Challenge	France	270,000	(Spain) Joel Moscatel (2)	6.45		
21 Jul	Euram Bank Open	Austria	270,000	(England) Frank Kennedy (1)	5.63		
28 Jul	Black Desert NI Open	Northern Ireland	£250,000	(Republic of Ireland) Conor Purcell (1)	6.86		
4 Aug	Irish Challenge	Ireland	270,000	(Sweden) Joakim Lagergren (2)	6.81		
11 Aug	Farmfoods Scottish Challenge	Scotland	£250,000	(England) Brandon Robinson-Thompson (2)	5.73		
18 Aug	Vierumäki Finnish Challenge	Finland	270,000	(Sweden) Christofer Blomstrand (1)	5.21		
25 Aug	Indoor Golf Group Challenge	Sweden	270,000	(Sweden) Joakim Lagergren (3)	4.97		
1 Sep	Rosa Challenge Tour	Poland	270,000	(Spain) Ángel Ayora (1)	5.70		New tournament
8 Sep	Big Green Egg German Challenge	Germany	270,000	(Denmark) Rasmus Neergaard-Petersen (3) (Note: Neergaard-Petersen earned immediate promotion to the European Tour, as this was his third win of the season.)	4.87		
15 Sep	Open de Portugal	Portugal	270,000	(United States) Matt Oshrine (1)	6.33		
22 Sep	Italian Challenge Open	Italy	350,000	(England) John Parry (4) (Note: Parry earned immediate promotion to the European Tour, as this was his third win of the season.)	6.86		
29 Sep	Swiss Challenge	France	270,000	(Scotland) Euan Walker (2)	4.05		
5 Oct	D+D Real Czech Challenge	Czech Republic	270,000	(Zimbabwe) Benjamin Follett-Smith (2)	3.90		
13 Oct	Hainan Open	China	US$500,000	(Denmark) Hamish Brown (2)	5.40	CHN	
20 Oct	Hangzhou Open	China	US$500,000	(Republic of Ireland) Conor Purcell (2)	5.59	CHN	New tournament
3 Nov	Rolex Challenge Tour Grand Final	Spain	500,000	(Norway) Kristoffer Reitan (1)	5.33		Tour Championship

== Rankings ==
The rankings were titled as the Road to Mallorca and were based on tournament results during the season, calculated using a points-based system. The top 22 players on the rankings earned status to play on the 2025 European Tour (DP World Tour). (Note: Rasmus Neergaard-Petersen (1st) and Robin Williams (14th) were already exempt via the 2024 Race to Dubai; status was extended to players ranked 21st (Nicolai von Dellingshausen) and 22nd (Lucas Bjerregaard).)

Rank	Player	Points
1	(Denmark) Rasmus Neergaard-Petersen	1,826
2	(England) John Parry	1,595
3	(Finland) Oliver Lindell	1,497
4	(Spain) Ángel Ayora	1,488
5	(Denmark) Hamish Brown	1,477
