= 2017 China Tour =

Golf tour season

2017 China Tour season
- Duration: 8 June 2017 – 3 December 2018
- Number of official events: 15
- Most wins: (South Korea) Cho Rak-hyun (2)
- Order of Merit: (South Korea) Cho Rak-hyun

The 2017 China Tour was the fourth season of the China Tour, the main professional golf tour in China since separating from PGA Tour China in 2017.

== Schedule ==
The following table lists official events during the 2017 season.

Date	Tournament	Location	Purse (CN¥)	Winner (Note: The number in brackets after each winner's name is the number of China Tour events they had won up to and including that tournament.)	OWGR points	Other tours (Note: ASA − Asian Tour; CHA − Challenge Tour.)
11 Jun	St. Andrews Henan Open	Henan	1,350,000	(South Korea) Cho Rak-hyun (1)	n/a	
25 Jun	Fragrant Hills Beijing Open	Beijing	1,350,000	(Australia) Bryden Macpherson (3)	n/a	
2 Jul	White Mountain Wanda Open	Jilin	1,350,000	(South Korea) Cho Rak-hyun (2)	n/a	
13 Aug	Yulongwan Yunnan Open	Yunnan	1,350,000	(New Zealand) Josh Geary (4)	n/a	
20 Aug	CGD Yunnan Championship	Yunnan	1,350,000	(Hong Kong) Hak Shunyat (1)	n/a	
17 Sep	Beijing Classic	Beijing	1,350,000	(Thailand) Gunn Charoenkul (3)	n/a	
24 Sep	Binhai Forest Tianjin Open	Tianjin	1,350,000	(Japan) Taihei Sato (1)	n/a	
1 Oct	Pure Pu'Er Tea Classic	Tianjin	1,350,000	(United States) Sejun Yoon (1)	n/a	
8 Oct	Shenzhou Peninsula Classic	Hainan	1,350,000	(South Korea) Kim Tae-woo (3)	n/a	
15 Oct	Hainan Open	Hainan	US$350,000	(South Africa) Erik van Rooyen (n/a)	13	CHA
22 Oct	Foshan Open	Guangdong	US$500,000	(Wales) Oliver Farr (n/a)	13	CHA
12 Nov	Jiangsu Open	Jiangsu	1,350,000	(England) Callum Tarren (1)	n/a	
19 Nov	Hunan Taohuayuan Open	Hunan	1,350,000	(United States) Ben Lein (1)	n/a	
26 Nov	Chongqing Jiangnan NewTown KingRun Open	Chongqing	1,350,000	(Australia) Kevin Lee (1)	n/a	
3 Dec	KG S&H City Asian Golf Championship	Fujian	US$350,000	(China) Xiao Bowen (1)	14	ASA

== Order of Merit ==
The Order of Merit was based on prize money won during the season, calculated in Renminbi. The leading player on the Order of Merit earned status to play on the 2018 European Tour.

Position	Player	Prize money (CN¥)	Status earned
1	(South Korea) Cho Rak-hyun	873,936	Promoted to European Tour
2	(Australia) Bryden Macpherson	873,125	
3	(England) Callum Tarren	782,075	
4	(Thailand) Gunn Charoenkul	581,130	
5	(Australia) Maverick Antcliff	560,018	
