= 2025 Professional Golf Tour of India =

Golf tour season

2025 Professional Golf Tour of India season
- Duration: 11 February 2025 – 28 December 2025
- Number of official events: 28
- Most wins: (India) Yuvraj Sandhu (7)
- Order of Merit: (India) Yuvraj Sandhu

The 2025 Professional Golf Tour of India was the 18th season of the Professional Golf Tour of India, the main professional golf tour in India since it was formed in 2006.

== Schedule ==
The following table lists official events during the 2025 season.

| Date | Tournament | Location | Purse (₹) | Winner (Note: The number in brackets after each winner's name is the number of Professional Golf Tour of India events they had won up to and including that tournament.) | OWGR points | Other tours (Note: CHA − Challenge Tour; EUR − European Tour.) |
|---|---|---|---|---|---|---|
| 14 Feb | Tata Steel PGTI Players Championship (Tollygunge) | West Bengal | 10,000,000 | (India) Yuvraj Sandhu (7) | 1.31 | |
| 21 Feb | Gujarat Open Golf Championship | Gujarat | 10,000,000 | (India) Yuvraj Sandhu (8) | 1.27 | |
| 28 Feb | SECL Chhattisgarh Open Golf Championship | Chhattisgarh | 10,000,000 | (India) Shaurya Bhattacharya (2) | 1.05 | |
| 7 Mar | Ahmedabad Open Golf Championship | Gujarat | 10,000,000 | (Sri Lanka) Nadaraja Thangaraja (5) | 1.06 | |
| 16 Mar | Kolkata Challenge | West Bengal | US$300,000 | (England) Joshua Berry (n/a) | 8.40 | CHA |
| 23 Mar | Delhi Challenge | Gujarat | US$300,000 | (Spain) Quim Vidal (n/a) | 8.12 | CHA |
| 30 Mar | Hero Indian Open | Haryana | US$2,250,000 | (Spain) Eugenio Chacarra (n/a) | 15.91 | EUR |
| 4 Apr | Adani Invitational | Uttar Pradesh | 15,000,000 | (India) Saptak Talwar (1) | 1.47 | |
| 12 Apr | Indorama Ventures Open Golf Championship | Gujarat | 20,000,000 | (India) Sachin Baisoya (4) | 1.42 | |
| 18 Apr | Calance Open | Delhi | 10,000,000 | (India) Tapendra Ghai (1) | 1.31 | |
| 24 Apr | PGTI Players Championship (Classic) | Haryana | 6,000,000 | (India) Viraj Madappa (3) | 0.33 | |
| 26 Apr | Kapil Dev - Grant Thornton Invitational | Karnataka | 20,000,000 | (India) Angad Cheema (3) | 1.35 | |
| 8 Aug | Coal India Open | Ahmedabad | 10,000,000 | (India) Angad Cheema (4) | 1.12 | |
| 15 Aug | Mysuru Open | Mysuru | 10,000,000 | (India) Yuvraj Sandhu (9) | 1.35 | |
| 22 Aug | PGTI Players Championship (Clover Greens) | Tamilnadu | 10,000,000 | (India) Yuvraj Sandhu (10) | 1.12 | |
| 29 Aug | Kolar Open | Karnataka | 10,000,000 | (India) Kshitij Naveed Kaul (5) | 0.94 | |
| 19 Sep | Chennai Open | Chennai | 10,000,000 | (Sri Lanka) Nadaraja Thangaraja (5) | 0.89 | |
| 26 Sep | Telangana Golconda Masters | Hyderabad | 10,000,000 | (Bangladesh) Jamal Hossain (3) | 0.91 | |
| 3 Oct | Tamil Nadu Open | Coimbatore | 10,000,000 | (India) Arjun Prasad (1) | 0.68 | |
| 10 Oct | Bengaluru Open | Karnataka | 10,000,000 | (Sri Lanka) Nadaraja Thangaraja (6) | 1.07 | |
| 19 Oct | DP World India Championship | Delhi | US$4,000,000 | (England) Tommy Fleetwood (n/a) | 25.51 | EUR |
| 31 Oct | Poona Club Open | Maharashtra | 10,000,000 | (India) Shaurya Bhattacharya (3) | 0.98 | |
| 14 Nov | Trident Open | Haryana | 10,000,000 | (India) Manu Gandas (9) | 1.01 | |
| 21 Nov | IndianOil Servo Masters | Assam | 10,000,000 | (India) Yuvraj Sandhu (11) | 1.05 | |
| 5 Dec | Jaipur Open | Rajasthan | 10,000,000 | (India) Veer Ahlawat (5) | 1.17 | |
| 12 Dec | Vishwa Samudra Open | Delhi | 20,000,000 | (India) Yuvraj Sandhu (12) | 1.22 | |
| 19 Dec | CIDCO Open | Maharashtra | 10,000,000 | (India) Veer Ahlawat (6) | 1.00 | |
| 28 Dec | Tata Open | Jharkhand | 20,000,000 | (India) Yuvraj Sandhu (13) | 1.39 | |

== Order of Merit ==
The Order of Merit was based on prize money won during the season, calculated in Indian rupees. The leading player on the Order of Merit earned status to play on the 2026 European Tour (DP World Tour).

| Position | Player | Prize money (₹) | Status earned |
|---|---|---|---|
| 1 | (India) Yuvraj Sandhu | 19,167,100 | Promoted to European Tour |
| 2 | (Sri Lanka) Nadaraja Thangaraja | 11,821,821 | |
| 3 | (India) Shaurya Bhattacharya | 10,778,775 | |
| 4 | (India) Arjun Prasad | 9,487,799 | |
| 5 | (India) Manu Gandas | 8,888,296 | |
