= 2022 China Tour =

Golf tour season

2022 China Tour season
- Duration: 7 July 2022 – 25 December 2022
- Number of official events: 7 (Note: A further two tournaments were scheduled but were either cancelled or otherwise removed from the schedule.)
- Order of Merit: (China) Ma Chengyao

The 2022 China Tour was the eighth season of the China Tour, the main professional golf tour in China since separating from PGA Tour China in 2017.

== Schedule ==
The following table lists official events during the 2022 season.

Date	Tournament	Location	Purse (CN¥)	Winner (Note: The number in brackets after each winner's name is the number of China Tour events they had won up to and including that tournament.)	OWGR points	Other tours (Note: CHA − Challenge Tour; CHNLPGA − China LPGA Tour.)
10 Jul	Hangzhou International Championship	Zhejiang	1,200,000	(China) An Tong (a) (n/a)	6	CHNLPGA (Note: Mixed event)
21 Aug	Shenyang National Open	Liaoning	500,000	(China) She Zihan (1)	0.22	
~~23 Oct~~	Foshan Open	Guangdong	–	Cancelled	–	CHA
13 Nov	Hengdian Championship	Zhejiang	1,000,000	(China) Ma Chengyao (1)	0.18	
~~20 Nov~~; ~~30 Sep~~	Jinan Open	Shandong	–	Removed	–	
4 Dec	Mitsubishi Electric Open	Jiangsu	500,000	(China) Xiao Bowen (2)	0.26	
11 Dec	Hainan Open	Hainan	500,000	(China) Bai Zhengkai (2)	0.23	
17 Dec	CGA Championship	Fujian	800,000	(China) Zhou Ziqin (a) (1)	0.28	
25 Dec; ~~27 Nov~~	Chongqing Open	Chongqing	500,000	(China) Zhou Yanhan (a) (1)	0.17	

== Order of Merit ==
The Order of Merit was based on prize money won during the season, calculated in Renminbi. The leading player on the Order of Merit earned status to play on the 2023 European Tour (DP World Tour).

Position	Player	Prize money (CN¥)	Status earned
1	(China) Ma Chengyao	279,808	Promoted to European Tour
2	(China) She Zihan	228,150	
3	(China) Chen Zihao	207,813	
4	(China) Jing Zeyu	193,752	
5	(China) Xiao Bowen	192,285	
