= Volvo China Open =

Annual golf tournament

Coordinates: 22.33°N 114.06°E

Tournament information
- Location: Shanghai, China
- Established: 1995
- Course: Enhance Anting Golf Club
- Par: 71
- Length: 7,168 yards (6,554 m)
- Tours: European Tour; Asian Tour; China Tour; Asia Golf Circuit; OneAsia Tour
- Format: Stroke play
- Prize fund: US$2,750,000
- Month played: April

Tournament record score
- Aggregate: 264 Nicolas Colsaerts (2011)
- To par: −24 as above

Current champion
- (Austria) Bernd Wiesberger

Location map
- Location in China

The Volvo China Open is a men's golf tournament that has been held annually in China since 1995. The event is organised by the China Golf Association and was co-sanctioned by the European Tour from 2004 until 2019. It has also featured as part of the Asian Tour, the OneAsia Tour, the China Tour and the Asia Golf Circuit.

== History ==
The first event was played in 1995 as the China Open and featured on the Asia Golf Circuit. Raúl Fretes was the inaugural champion. The following year the event moved to the Asian Tour's schedule and continued to through 2008. The event joined the European Tour in 2004. Stephen Dodd won the first edition on the European Tour.

Changes occurred in 2009 with the announcement of the OneAsia Tour, a new golf tour set up by the China Golf Association in partnership with the PGA Tour of Australasia, the Japan Golf Tour, the Korean PGA and the Korean Golf Association. Having been involved in the early stages, the Asian Tour withdrew from the OneAsia Tour. As a result, four events, the Volvo China Open, Pine Valley Beijing Open, Korea Open and Midea China Classic were removed from the schedule and subsequently became the founding events of the new tour. In addition, the Asian Tour stated that they would not allow their members to play in those events unless already qualified via membership of the European Tour, promising stiff penalties for those that ignored this ruling.

In 2011, Nicolas Colsaerts broke the tournament scoring record, shooting an aggregate of 264 (24 under par). He won by four shots.

Wu Ashun won the 2015 event by one shot over David Howell. He made history as he became the first Chinese player to win a European Tour event on home soil. Li Haotong won the event the following year, shooting a final-round 64 to win by three shots. He also became the second successive winner on home soil.

Due to the COVID-19 pandemic, the 2020 and 2021 events were not sanctioned by the European Tour and proceeded as sole-sanctioned China Tour events. Zhang Jin won the 2021 event by making birdie at the final hole to beat Li Haotong by one shot. The 2022 event was scheduled to take place at the end of April on the European Tour but was postponed as restrictions due to the pandemic persisted in China, and ultimately not played. In 2023, it returned to the Asian Tour schedule as part of the International Series, and in 2024 will return to the European Tour.

== Venues ==
The following venues have been used since the founding of the Volvo China Open in 1995.

Venue	Location	First	Last	Times
Beijing International Golf Club	Beijing	1995	1997	3
Shanghai Sun Island International Club	Shanghai	1998	1998	1
Shanghai Silport Golf Club	Shanghai	1999	2007	7
Shenzhen Golf Club	Shenzhen	2005	2005	1
Beijing Honghua International Golf Club	Beijing	2006	2006	1
Beijing CBD International Golf Club	Beijing	2008	2009	2
Suzhou Jinji Lake International Golf Club	Jiangsu	2010	2010	1
Luxehills International Country Club	Sichuan	2011	2011	1
Binhai Lake Golf Club	Tianjin	2012	2013	2
Hidden Grace Golf Club (Note: Formerly Genzon Golf Club.)	Shenzhen	2014	2024	5
Tomson Shanghai Pudong Golf Club	Shanghai	2015	2015	1
Topwin Golf and Country Club	Beijing	2016	2018	3
Enhance Anting Golf Club	Shanghai	2025	2025	1

== Winners ==
Year	Tour(s) (Note: AGC − Asia Golf Circuit; ASA − Asian Tour; CHN − China Tour; EUR − European Tour; ONE − OneAsia Tour.)	Winner	Score	To par	Margin of victory	Runner(s)-up	Venue
2026	CHN, EUR	(Austria) Bernd Wiesberger	265	−19	3 strokes	(United Arab Emirates) Adrián Otaegui	Enhance Anting
2025	CHN, EUR	(China) Wu Ashun (2)	270	−14	1 stroke	(England) Jordan Smith	Enhance Anting
2024	CHN, EUR	(Spain) Adrián Otaegui	198 (Note: Shortened to 54 holes due to weather.)	−18	1 stroke	(Italy) Guido Migliozzi	Hidden Grace
2023	ASA, CHN	(Thailand) Sarit Suwannarut	269	−19	6 strokes	(China) Chen Guxin (Hong Kong) Kho Taichi	Hidden Grace
2022	EUR	No tournament due to the COVID-19 pandemic					
2021	CHN, ~~EUR~~ (Note: Tournament held without European Tour/Asian Tour sanctioning due to the COVID-19 pandemic.)	(China) Zhang Jin	280	−8	1 stroke	(China) Li Haotong	Genzon
2020	~~ASA~~, CHN, ~~EUR~~	(China) Zhang Huilin	269	−19	9 strokes	(China) Ding Wenyi (a)	Genzon
2019	ASA, EUR	(Finland) Mikko Korhonen	268	−20	Playoff	(France) Benjamin Hébert	Genzon
2018	ASA, EUR	(Sweden) Alexander Björk	270	−18	1 stroke	(Spain) Adrián Otaegui	Topwin
2017	EUR, ONE	(France) Alexander Lévy (2)	271	−17	Playoff	(South Africa) Dylan Frittelli	Topwin
2016	EUR, ONE	(China) Li Haotong	266	−22	3 strokes	(Chile) Felipe Aguilar	Topwin
2015	EUR, ONE	(China) Wu Ashun	279	−9	1 stroke	(England) David Howell	Tomson Shanghai Pudong
2014	EUR, ONE	(France) Alexander Lévy	269	−19	4 strokes	(England) Tommy Fleetwood	Genzon
2013	EUR, ONE	(Australia) Brett Rumford	272	−16	4 strokes	(Finland) Mikko Ilonen	Binhai Lake
2012	EUR, ONE	(South Africa) Branden Grace	267	−21	3 strokes	(Belgium) Nicolas Colsaerts	Binhai Lake
2011	EUR, ONE	(Belgium) Nicolas Colsaerts	264	−24	4 strokes	(Denmark) Søren Kjeldsen (Republic of Ireland) Peter Lawrie (New Zealand) Danny Lee (Spain) Pablo Martín	Luxehills International
2010	EUR, ONE	(South Korea) Yang Yong-eun	273	−15	2 strokes	(Wales) Rhys Davies (Wales) Stephen Dodd	Suzhou Jinji Lake
2009	EUR, ONE	(Australia) Scott Strange	280	−8	1 stroke	(Spain) Gonzalo Fernández-Castaño	Beijing CBD International
2008	ASA, EUR	(Republic of Ireland) Damien McGrane	278	−10	9 strokes	(England) Simon Griffiths (France) Mike Lorenzo-Vera (England) Oliver Wilson	Beijing CBD International
2007	ASA, EUR	(Austria) Markus Brier	274	−10	5 strokes	(Australia) Scott Hend (Northern Ireland) Graeme McDowell (South Africa) Andrew McLardy	Shanghai Silport
2006	ASA, EUR	(India) Jeev Milkha Singh	278	−10	1 stroke	(Spain) Gonzalo Fernández-Castaño	Beijing Honghua International
2005	ASA, EUR	(England) Paul Casey	275	−13	Playoff	(England) Oliver Wilson	Shenzhen
2004	ASA, EUR	(Wales) Stephen Dodd	276	−12	3 strokes	(Denmark) Thomas Bjørn	Shanghai Silport
2003	ASA	(China) Zhang Lianwei	277	−11	2 strokes	(Thailand) Thaworn Wiratchant	Shanghai Silport
2002	ASA	(Australia) David Gleeson	272	−16	1 stroke	(Mexico) Pablo del Olmo	Shanghai Silport
2001	ASA	(South Korea) Charlie Wi	272	−16	1 stroke	(Thailand) Thongchai Jaidee	Shanghai Silport
2000	ASA	(England) Simon Dyson	275	−13	1 stroke	(India) Jyoti Randhawa	Shanghai Silport
1999	ASA	(Myanmar) Kyi Hla Han	273	−15	7 strokes	(United States) Christian Peña	Shanghai Silport
1998	ASA	(England) Ed Fryatt	269	−19	2 strokes	(Japan) Takeshi Ohyama	Shanghai Sun Island International
1997	ASA	(China) Cheng Jun	280	−8	5 strokes	(Australia) Adrian Percey	Beijing International
1996	ASA	(Thailand) Prayad Marksaeng	269	−19	9 strokes	(Taiwan) Hsieh Yu-shu	Beijing International
1995	AGC	(Paraguay) Raúl Fretes	277	−11	3 strokes	(Taiwan) Lai Ying-juh	Beijing International

== See also ==
- Open golf tournament
