= Zhou Yanhan =

Chinese professional golfer (born 2004)

Personal information
- Nickname: The Toddler
- Nationality: China
- Born: 5 April 2008 (age 18) Chongqing, China
- Height: 6 ft 0 in (183 cm)
- Weight: 198 lb (90 kg)

Career
- Sport: Golf
- Turned professional: 2024
- Current tours: European Tour; China Tour
- Professional wins: 12

Achievements and awards
- China Tour Order of Merit winner: 2025

Zhou Yanhan (Chinese: 周彦含; born 5 April 2008), also known as Yanhan Zhou, is a Chinese professional golfer and European Tour player. He won the 2025 China Tour Order of Merit and was runner-up at the 2026 Danish Golf Championship.

== Early life and family ==
Zhou started playing golf at age three. His father Xunshu Zhou is a professional golfer and serves as his coach and caddie.

== Amateur career ==
Zhou won the 2022 Chongqing Open in a playoff at age 14 years, 8 months, and 20 days to become the youngest male champion in China Tour history. He also captured the 2023 China Amateur Open.

== Professional career ==
Zhou turned professional at the start of 2024. He won seven titles to capture the 2025 China Tour Order of Merit, and to earn his place on the European Tour for 2026, at only 17. With 11 victories, he holds the record of most wins in Official World Golf Ranking-sanctioned events at this age.

He made his European Tour debut in the Bapco Energies Bahrain Championship and recorded a tie for 3rd at the Hainan Classic and a runner-up finish at Danish Golf Championship, to finish 92nd in the Order of Merit and keep his card.

== Amateur wins ==
- 2021 Buick National Junior Classic #3
- 2022 Super Lychee National Amateur Golf Tournament #2, CGA International Junior Golf Masters (Hai Nan), National Amateur Tour #2
- 2023 CLPGQ Gionee·Zhaoqing Series #2, CLPGQ Gionee·Zhaoqing Series - #3, China Amateur Open

== Professional wins (12) ==
=== China Tour wins (12) ===
No.	Date	Tournament	Winning score	Margin of victory	Runner(s)-up
1	25 Dec 2022	Chongqing Open (as an amateur)	−8 (68-68-72-72=280)	Playoff	(China) Shen Nannan
2	26 Nov 2023	Chongqing Open (2) (as an amateur)	−8 (64-68-65-70=267)	1 stroke	(China) Yang Yinong
3	24 Nov 2024	Straits Cup Xiamen Open	−24 (66-64-66-68=264)	5 strokes	(China) Charles Wang
4	1 Dec 2024	Chongqing Open (3)	−11 (72-70-67-68=277)	1 stroke	(Taiwan) Lawrence Ting
5	18 May 2025	Chongqing Open (4)	−28 (65-63-64-68=260)	5 strokes	(China) Charles Wang
6	22 Jun 2025	Shandong Culture and Tourism Jinan Open	−20 (69-64-70-65=268)	2 strokes	(Hong Kong) Hak Shunyat
7	14 Sep 2025	Golfjoy Open	−28 (68-68-68-71=275)	Playoff	(China) Cao Senshou
8	28 Sep 2025	Jingpai Wuhan Modern Land Beyond Sky Open	−19 (68-66-70-65=269)	2 strokes	(China) Chai Bowen
9	2 Nov 2025	Hongyun Lang Wanning Open	−28 (61-62-65=188)	5 strokes	(China) Xiao Bowen
10	23 Nov 2025	Hongyun Lang Chengdu Open	−21 (69-67-66-65=267)	Playoff	(China) Jin Bo
11	7 Dec 2025	Shanghai Open	−18 (67-66-68-69=270)	1 stroke	(China) Chai Bowen, (United States) Shawn Lu
12	15 Nov 2026	AITO China Sports Lottery Match Play Championship	5 and 3		(China) Peng Bo
