= David Ravetto =

French professional golfer (born 1997)

Personal information
- Nationality: France
- Born: 14 June 1997 (age 29) Boulogne-Billancourt, France
- Height: 5 ft 9 in (1.75 m)
- Weight: 165 lb (75 kg)

Career
- Sport: Golf
- College: Texas Wesleyan University; Texas Christian University
- Turned professional: 2020
- Current tour: European Tour
- Former tour: Challenge Tour
- Professional wins: 2

Number of wins by tour
- European Tour: 1
- Sunshine Tour: 1
- Challenge Tour: 1

David Ravetto (born 14 June 1997) is a French professional golfer and European Tour player. In 2024, he won the Dimension Data Pro-Am and the D+D Real Czech Masters.

== Amateur career ==
Ravetto was born in Boulogne-Billancourt. He had success as an amateur, winning English Men's Open Amateur Stroke Play Championship for the Brabazon Trophy. He appeared twice for France in the European Amateur Team Championship, and finished 4th at the 2020 European Amateur in Switzerland.

Ravetto attended university in Texas 2015 to 2019 (Texas Wesleyan University 2015–2017 and Texas Christian University 2017–2019). As a freshman, he won the individual NAIA National Championship, was NAIA Arnold Palmer National Individual Champion, was named the Phil Mickelson Outstanding Freshman and Ping NAIA First-Team All-American. He set a school record with a season scoring average of 71.70, and his score of 281 at the NAIA National Championship was the program's sixth lowest of all time.

== Professional career ==
Ravetto turned professional in 2020 and joined the 2021 Challenge Tour. He finished 40th in the Road to Mallorca rankings after he lost in a playoff to compatriot Pierre Pineau at the 2022 Open de Portugal.

Ravetto earned his card for the 2023 European Tour at Q-School. In 2024, he won the Dimension Data Pro-Am in South Africa and his maiden European Tour title at the D+D Real Czech Masters in Prague.

== Amateur wins ==
- 2016 NAIA National Championship
- 2017 DBU Patriot Classic
- 2018 Mission Inn Spring Spectacular, Lake Charles Toyota Invitational, Campeonato Nacional por Golpes
- 2019 Brabazon Trophy

== Professional wins (2) ==
=== European Tour wins (1) ===
| No. | Date | Tournament | Winning score | Margin of victory | Runner-up |
|---|---|---|---|---|---|
| 1 | 18 Aug 2024 | D+D Real Czech Masters | −23 (68-63-70-64=265) | 4 strokes | (Sweden) Jesper Svensson |

=== Challenge Tour wins (1) ===
| No. | Date | Tournament | Winning score | Margin of victory | Runner-up |
|---|---|---|---|---|---|
| 1 | 18 Feb 2024 | Dimension Data Pro-Am^{1} | −15 (68-66-71-69=274) | 2 strokes | (England) Sam Hutsby |

^{1}Co-sanctioned by the Sunshine Tour

Challenge Tour playoff record (0–1)

| No. | Year | Tournament | Opponents | Result |
|---|---|---|---|---|
| 1 | 2022 | Open de Portugal | (France) Félix Mory, (France) Pierre Pineau | Pineau won with eagle on first extra hole |

== Team appearances ==
Amateur

- European Amateur Team Championship (representing France): 2019, 2020

== See also ==
- 2022 European Tour Qualifying School graduates
- 2023 European Tour Qualifying School graduates
