= 2023 China Tour =

Golf tour season

2023 China Tour season
- Duration: 11 May 2023 – 10 December 2023
- Number of official events: 13
- Most wins: (China) Li Linqiang (4)
- Order of Merit: (China) Chen Guxin

The 2023 China Tour was the ninth season of the China Tour, the main professional golf tour in China since separating from PGA Tour China in 2017.

== Schedule ==
The following table lists official events during the 2023 season.

Date	Tournament	Location	Purse (CN¥)	Winner (Note: The number in brackets after each winner's name is the number of China Tour events they had won up to and including that tournament.)	OWGR points	Other tours (Note: ASA − Asian Tour; CHA − Challenge Tour; CHNLPGA − China LPGA Tour.)
14 May	Guangdong Open	Guangdong	500,000	(China) Shen Nannan (1)	0.47	
21 May	Jinan Open	Shandong	500,000	(China) Li Linqiang (1)	0.43	
28 May	Exciting Hangzhou West Lake Open	Zhejiang	500,000	(China) Liu Enhua (1)	0.49	
4 Jun	Zhengzou Open	Hainan	500,000	(China) Luo Xuewen (2)	0.42	
22 Jul	Volvo China Open Qualifying	Hubei	500,000	(China) Ye Wocheng (3)	0.42	
26 Aug	Guotai Cup Men's and Women's Professional Match Play	Guizho	500,000	(China) Li Linqiang (2)	0.26	CHNLPGA (Note: Mixed event)
10 Sep	Guotai Cup Open	Henan	500,000	(China) Li Linqiang (3)	0.34	
16 Oct	Hainan Open	Hainan	US$500,000	(Portugal) Ricardo Gouveia (n/a)	4.27	CHA
22 Oct	Mitsubishi Electric Fa Golf Open	Jiangsu	500,000	(New Zealand) Kieran Muir (2)	0.35	
29 Oct	Hengdian International Elite Pro-Am	Zhejiang	1,200,000	(China) Li Linqiang (4)	0.38	
5 Nov	Volvo China Open	Guangdong	US$1,500,000	(Thailand) Sarit Suwannarut (1)	6.49	ASA (Note: Asian Tour International Series)
26 Nov	Chongqing Open	Chongqing	500,000	(China) Zhou Yanhan (a) (2)	0.43	
10 Dec	CGA Championship	Guangdong	1,200,000	(China) Tong Yang (1)	0.44	

== Order of Merit ==
The Order of Merit was based on prize money won during the season, calculated in Renminbi. The leading player on the Order of Merit earned status to play on the 2024 European Tour (DP World Tour).

Position	Player	Prize money (CN¥)	Status earned
1	(China) Chen Guxin	690,777	Promoted to European Tour
2	(China) Li Linqiang	605,436	
3	(China) Liu Enhua	319,582	
4	(China) Tong Yang	270,784	
5	(China) Luo Xuewen	264,763	
