= Binhai Lake Golf Club =

Golf course in Tianjin, China

Binhai Lake Golf Club is a links-style golf course located in Tianjin, China. The course is designed by Pete Dye and plays to a par of 72 and 7,667 yards (7,011 m) from the backmost tees. The course hosted the 2012 Volvo China Open, a tournament co-sanctioned by the European Tour and the OneAsia Tour. Branden Grace won the tournament with a 4-day total score of 267 (21 under par), a 3-shot victory over runner-up Nicolas Colsaerts. The course record is a 9 under par 63 shot by Alex Norén in the third round.
