= Hainan Open =

Golf tournament in Hainan, China

Tournament information
- Location: Sanya, Hainan, China
- Established: 2014
- Course: Sanya Luhuitou Golf Club
- Par: 72
- Length: 7,184 yards (6,569 m)
- Tours: Challenge Tour; China Tour; PGA Tour China
- Format: Stroke play
- Prize fund: US$500,000
- Month played: October

Tournament record score
- Aggregate: 265 Lars van der Vight (2026)
- To par: −23 as above

Current champion
- (Netherlands) Lars van der Vight

Location map
- Location in China

The Hainan Open is a golf tournament on the Challenge Tour, beginning in 2016, held at the Sanya Luhuitou Golf Club in Hainan, China.

The event was played in 2014 and 2015 as part of PGA Tour China. Since 2017 it has been part of the China Tour. The 2014 event was held at Sanya Luhuitou Golf Club while in 2015 it was held at Dragon Valley Golf Course.

== Winners ==
Year	Tour(s) (Note: CHA − Challenge Tour; CHN − China Tour; PGATCHN − PGA Tour China.)	Winner	Score	To par	Margin of victory	Runner(s)-up	Ref.
2026	CHA, CHN	(Netherlands) Lars van der Vight	265	−23	2 strokes	(Spain) Joseba Torres	
2025	CHA, CHN	(Italy) Renato Paratore	271	−17	Playoff	(Austria) Maximilian Steinlechner	
2024	CHA, CHN	(Denmark) Hamish Brown	269	−19	Playoff	(Philippines) Lloyd Jefferson Go	
2023	CHA, CHN	(Portugal) Ricardo Gouveia	272	−16	3 strokes	(Switzerland) Joel Girrbach	
2022	CHN	(China) Bai Zhengkai	271	−17	3 strokes	(China) Chen Zihao (China) Ma Chengyao (China) Xue Han	
2021	CHA, CHN	Cancelled due to the COVID-19 pandemic					
2020	CHA, CHN	Cancelled due to the COVID-19 pandemic					
2019	CHA, CHN	(Italy) Francesco Laporta	274	−14	1 stroke	(France) Robin Roussel	
2018	CHA, CHN	(Finland) Kalle Samooja	273	−15	2 strokes	(Scotland) Grant Forrest	
2017	CHA, CHN	(South Africa) Erik van Rooyen	270	−18	2 strokes	(Scotland) Grant Forrest (Finland) Tapio Pulkkanen	
2016	CHA	(Germany) Alexander Knappe	135 (Note: Shortened to 36 holes due to rain.)	−9	2 strokes	(Spain) Pep Anglès	
2015	PGATCHN	(China) Zhang Huilin	286	−2	1 stroke	(China) Yuan Tian	
2014	PGATCHN	(China) Li Haotong	278	−10	6 strokes	(South Korea) Kim Do-hyun	
