= 2020–21 China Tour =

Golf tour season

2020–21 China Tour season
- Duration: 4 November 2020 – 19 December 2021
- Number of official events: 11 (Note: A further four tournaments were scheduled but were cancelled.)
- Most wins: (China) Chen Guxin (2) (China) Ye Wocheng (2)
- Order of Merit: (China) Zhang Huilin

The 2020–21 China Tour was the seventh season of the China Tour, the main professional golf tour in China since separating from PGA Tour China in 2017.

== In-season changes ==
Due to the COVID-19 pandemic, only two events were played in 2020, and so 2020 and 2021 were combined into a single season.

== Schedule ==
The following table lists official events during the 2020–21 season.

Date	Tournament	Location	Purse (CN¥)	Winner (Note: The number in brackets after each winner's name is the number of China Tour events they had won up to and including that tournament.)	OWGR points	Other tours (Note: CHA − Challenge Tour; CHNLPGA − China LPGA Tour.)
~~18 Oct 2020~~	Hainan Open	Hainan	–	Cancelled	–	CHA
~~25 Oct 2020~~	Foshan Open	Guangdong	–	Cancelled	–	CHA
7 Nov 2020	Hangzhou International Championship	Zhejiang	1,200,000	(China) Zhang Jienalin (n/a)	6	CHNLPGA (Note: Mixed event)
13 Dec 2020	Volvo China Open	Guangdong	2,000,000	(China) Zhang Huilin (3)	6	
25 Apr 2021	Sanya Classic	Hainan	350,000	(China) Ye Wocheng (1)	6	
1 May 2021	Boao Classic	Hainan	350,000	(China) Ding Wenyi (a) (1)	6	
15 May 2021	Nanshan Classic	Shandong	350,000	(China) Ye Wocheng (2)	6	
29 May 2021	Zhengzhou Classic	Fujian	350,000	(China) Liu Yanwei (1)	6	
6 Jun 2021	Lanhai Classic	Jiangsu	350,000	(China) Chen Guxin (1)	6	
13 Jun 2021	Wuhan Classic	Hubei	350,000	(China) Luo Xuewen (1)	6	
20 Jun 2021	Xian Classic	Zhejiang	350,000	(China) Chen Guxin (2)	6	
~~17 Oct 2021~~	Hainan Open	Hainan	–	Cancelled	–	CHA
~~24 Oct 2021~~	Foshan Open	Guangdong	–	Cancelled	–	CHA
3 Nov 2021	Hengdian Championship	Zhejiang	1,000,000	(Hong Kong) Hak Shunyat (3)	6	
19 Dec 2021	Volvo China Open	Guangdong	2,000,000	(China) Zhang Jin (1)	6	

== Order of Merit ==
The Order of Merit was based on prize money won during the season, calculated in Renminbi. The leading player on the Order of Merit earned status to play on the 2022 European Tour (DP World Tour).

Position	Player	Prize money (CN¥)	Status earned
1	(China) Zhang Huilin	536,425	Promoted to European Tour
2	(Hong Kong) Hak Shunyat	502,980	
3	(China) Liu Yanwei	482,045	
4	(China) Zhang Jin	434,107	
5	(China) Ye Wocheng	337,571	

== See also ==
- 2020 PGA Tour China
