= 2026 Challenge Tour =

Golf tour season

2026 Challenge Tour season
- Duration: 29 January 2026 – 1 November 2026
- Number of official events: 28 (Note: Two further tournaments were either cancelled or otherwise removed from the schedule.)
- Most wins: (Sweden) Christofer Blomstrand (2) (South Africa) M. J. Daffue (2) (England) John Gough (2) (France) Julien Sale (2) (Netherlands) Lars van der Vight (2)
- Rankings: (Denmark) Hamish Brown

The 2026 Challenge Tour, titled as the 2026 HotelPlanner Tour for sponsorship reasons, was the 38th season of the Challenge Tour, the official development tour to the European Tour.

== Schedule ==
The following table lists official events during the 2026 season.

Date	Tournament	Host country	Purse (€)	Winner (Note: The number in brackets after each winner's name is the number of Challenge Tour events they had won up to and including that tournament. This information is only shown for Challenge Tour members. It is rare for someone to accumulate many wins on the Challenge Tour as success at this level usually leads to promotion to the European Tour.)	OWGR points	Other tours (Note: AFR − Sunshine Tour; PGTI − Professional Golf Tour of India.)	Notes
1 Feb	SDC Open	South Africa	US$375,000	(South Africa) M. J. Viljoen (1)	9.05	AFR	
8 Feb	Circa Cape Town Open	South Africa	US$375,000	(England) Will Enefer (1)	8.72	AFR	
15 Feb	NTT Data Pro-Am	South Africa	R7,000,000	(South Africa) M. J. Daffue (1)	7.14	AFR	Pro-Am
22 Feb	Jonsson Workwear Durban Open	South Africa	US$375,000	(South Africa) Oliver Bekker (2)	6.57	AFR	
~~15 Mar~~	Indorama Ventures Open Golf Championship	India	~~US$300,000~~	Removed (Note: Proceeded as a sole-sanctioned Professional Golf Tour of India event due to the 2026 Iran war.)	–	~~PGTI~~	New to Challenge Tour
22 Mar	DP World PGTI Open	India	US$300,000	(South Africa) M. J. Daffue (2)	6.68	PGTI	New to Challenge Tour
10 May	Italian Challenge Open	Italy	300,000	(England) Chris Wood (1)	8.47		
17 May	Challenge de Catalunya	Spain	300,000	(Spain) Pablo Ereño (1)	9.25		
24 May	Danish Golf Challenge	Denmark	300,000	(Finland) Tapio Pulkkanen (2)	8.79		
31 May	Challenge de España	Spain	300,000	(South Africa) Ryan van Velzen (1)	8.32		
7 Jun	Swiss Challenge	Switzerland	300,000	(England) Matthew Southgate (1)	8.60		
14 Jun	Interwetten Open	Austria	300,000	(Czech Republic) Filip Mrůzek (1)	8.54		
21 Jun	English Open	England	£300,000	(United States) John Catlin (1)	8.94		New to Challenge Tour
28 Jun	Blot Play9	France	300,000	(England) John Gough (1)	8.34		
5 Jul	Le Vaudreuil Golf Challenge	France	300,000	(France) Julien Sale (1)	8.84		
12 Jul	German Challenge	Germany	300,000	(Netherlands) Lars van der Vight (1)	9.30		
26 Jul	Raiffeisenbank Golf Challenge	Czech Republic	300,000	(Germany) Anton Albers (1)	8.42		
2 Aug	Infortar Estonian Challenge	Estonia	300,000	(Scotland) Rory Franssen (1)	8.71		New tournament
9 Aug	Scottish Challenge	Scotland	£250,000	(Sweden) Christofer Blomstrand (2)	9.46		
16 Aug	Irish Challenge	Ireland	300,000	(South Africa) Justin Harding (1)	8.53		
23 Aug	Vierumäki Finnish Challenge	Finland	300,000	(Germany) Dominic Foos (2)	8.03		
30 Aug	Dormy Open	Sweden	300,000	(Sweden) Christofer Blomstrand (3)	8.79		
6 Sep	Rosa Challenge Tour	Poland	300,000	(England) John Gough (2)	8.48		
13 Sep	English Trophy	England	£250,000	(Denmark) Frederik Kjettrup (1)	9.17		
20 Sep	Open de Portugal	Portugal	300,000	(Denmark) Sebastian Friedrichsen (1)	8.69		
~~27 Sep~~; ~~26 Apr~~	RAKBANK UAE Challenge	UAE	~~US$350,000~~	Cancelled (Note: Originally rescheduled, but later cancelled due to the 2026 Iran war.)	–		
3 Oct; ~~19 Apr~~	Abu Dhabi Challenge	UAE	US$350,000	(Republic of Ireland) Liam Nolan (1)	8.15		
11 Oct	Hainan Open	China	US$500,000	(Netherlands) Lars van der Vight (2)	7.45	CHN	
18 Oct	Hangzhou Open	China	US$500,000	(Denmark) Hamish Brown (3)	7.10	CHN	
1 Nov	Grand Final	Spain	500,000	(France) Julien Sale (2)	4.37		Tour Championship

== Rankings ==
The rankings were titled as the Road to Mallorca and were based on tournament results during the season, calculated using a points-based system. The top 15 players on the rankings earned status to play on the 2027 European Tour (DP World Tour).

Rank	Player	Points
1	(Denmark) Hamish Brown	1,702
2	(France) Julien Sale	1,623
3	(Netherlands) Lars van der Vight	1,309
4	(Sweden) Christofer Blomstrand	1,276
5	(South Africa) M. J. Daffue	1,272
