= Sarasota Christian School =

Location
- 5415 Bahia Vista Street; Sarasota, Florida 34232; United States
- Coordinates: 27°19′33″N 82°27′42″W

Information
- School type: Private school
- Religious affiliation: Christian
- Opened: 1958
- High school principal: Jim Toth
- Middle school principal: Mark Martell
- Elementary Principal: Kathryn Ledford
- Teaching staff: 60 (on an FTE basis)
- Grades: PK–12
- Enrollment: 753 (2020-21)
- Student to teacher ratio: 10.8
- Campus size: 25 acres (10 ha)
- Colors: Blue and gold
- Nickname: Blazers
- Team name: Sarasota Christian Blazers
- Website: sarasotachristian.org

Sarasota Christian School is a private K-12 Christian school located in Sarasota, Florida.

== Demographics ==
The demographic breakdown of the 348 K-12 students enrolled for 2015-16 was:

- Asian - 5.8%
- Black - 2.0%
- Hispanic - 8.0%
- White - 81.3%
- Multiracial - 2.9%

NCES does not compile demographic data for preschool students.

== Athletics ==
The Sarasota Christian Blazers school colors are blue and gold. The following Florida High School Athletic Association (FHSAA) sanctioned sports are offered:

- Baseball (boys)
- Basketball (girls and boys)
- Cross country (girls and boys)
- Golf (girls and boys)
- Soccer (girls and boys)
- Softball (girls)
- Swimming (girls and boys)
- Tennis (girls and boys)
- Volleyball (girls)
- Beach volleyball (girls)
