= 2025 Challenge Tour =

Golf tour season

2025 Challenge Tour season
- Duration: 23 January 2025 – 2 November 2025
- Number of official events: 29
- Most wins: (Italy) Renato Paratore (3) (South Africa) J. C. Ritchie (3)
- Rankings: (South Africa) J. C. Ritchie

The 2025 Challenge Tour, titled as the 2025 HotelPlanner Tour for sponsorship reasons, was the 37th season of the Challenge Tour, the official development tour to the European Tour.

== HotelPlanner title sponsorship ==
In January, it was announced that the tour had signed a title sponsorship agreement with HotelPlanner, being renamed as the HotelPlanner Tour.

== Schedule ==
The following table lists official events during the 2025 season.

Date	Tournament	Host country	Purse (€)	Winner (Note: The number in brackets after each winner's name is the number of Challenge Tour events they had won up to and including that tournament. This information is only shown for Challenge Tour members. It is rare for someone to accumulate many wins on the Challenge Tour as success at this level usually leads to promotion to the European Tour.)	OWGR points	Other tours (Note: AFR − Sunshine Tour; CHN − China Tour; PGTI − Professional Golf Tour of India.)	Notes
26 Jan	SDC Open	South Africa	US$375,000	(South Africa) Daniel van Tonder (1)	8.42	AFR	
2 Feb	MyGolfLife Open	South Africa	US$375,000	(South Africa) Daniel van Tonder (2)	8.94	AFR	New to Challenge Tour
9 Feb	Cell C Cape Town Open	South Africa	US$375,000	(England) Jamie Rutherford (1)	8.76	AFR	
16 Feb	NTT Data Pro-Am	South Africa	R7,000,000	(South Africa) Wilco Nienaber (2)	9.54	AFR	Pro-Am
16 Mar	Kolkata Challenge	India	US$300,000	(England) Joshua Berry (1)	8.40	PGTI	
23 Mar	Delhi Challenge	India	US$300,000	(Spain) Quim Vidal (1)	8.12	PGTI	
13 Apr	UAE Challenge	UAE	US$300,000	(Italy) Renato Paratore (1)	9.21		
20 Apr	Abu Dhabi Challenge	UAE	US$300,000	(Italy) Renato Paratore (2)	9.24		
11 May	Challenge de España	Spain	300,000	(France) Clément Charmasson (1)	8.50		
25 May	Danish Golf Challenge	Denmark	300,000	(Denmark) Jonathan Gøth-Rasmussen (2)	8.93		
1 Jun	Challenge de Cádiz	Spain	300,000	(Spain) Rocco Repetto (1)	8.91		
8 Jun	Swiss Challenge	Switzerland	300,000	(France) Félix Mory (2)	8.76		
15 Jun	Raiffeisenbank Golf Challenge	Czech Republic	300,000	(United States) Palmer Jackson (1)	8.63		
22 Jun	Blot Play9	France	300,000	(England) James Morrison (1)	8.38		
29 Jun	Le Vaudreuil Golf Challenge	France	300,000	(England) David Horsey (3)	9.05		
6 Jul	Interwetten Open	Austria	300,000	(Austria) Maximilian Steinlechner (1)	8.79		
13 Jul	D+D Real Czech Challenge	Czech Republic	300,000	(Scotland) David Law (2)	9.18		
20 Jul	German Challenge	Germany	300,000	(South Africa) J. C. Ritchie (5)	8.93		
3 Aug	Farmfoods Scottish Challenge	Scotland	£250,000	(Scotland) Daniel Young (1)	9.22		
10 Aug	Irish Challenge	Ireland	300,000	(France) Oïhan Guillamoundeguy (1)	8.49		
17 Aug	Vierumäki Finnish Challenge	Finland	300,000	(Scotland) David Law (3)	8.24		
24 Aug	Dutch Futures	Netherlands	300,000	(Italy) Filippo Celli (1)	9.06		
31 Aug	Dormy Open	Sweden	300,000	(Denmark) Anders Emil Ejlersen (1)	8.39		
7 Sep	GAC Rosa Challenge Tour	Poland	300,000	(Sweden) Hugo Townsend (1)	9.06		
14 Sep	Open de Portugal	Portugal	300,000	(South Africa) J. C. Ritchie (6)	8.87		
21 Sep	Italian Challenge Open	Italy	300,000	(South Africa) J. C. Ritchie (7) (Note: Ritchie earned immediate promotion to the European Tour, as this was his third win of the season.)	8.58		
12 Oct	Hainan Open	China	US$500,000	(Italy) Renato Paratore (3) (Note: Paratore earned immediate promotion to the European Tour, as this was his third win of the season.)	7.42	CHN	
19 Oct	Hangzhou Open	China	US$500,000	(Spain) Sebastián García Rodríguez (1)	7.36	CHN	
2 Nov	Rolex Grand Final	Spain	500,000	(England) James Morrison (2)	4.74		Tour Championship

== Rankings ==
The rankings were titled as the Road to Mallorca and were based on tournament results during the season, calculated using a points-based system. The top 20 players on the rankings earned status to play on the 2026 European Tour (DP World Tour).

Rank	Player	Points
1	(South Africa) J. C. Ritchie	1,674
2	(Scotland) David Law	1,494
3	(Austria) Maximilian Steinlechner	1,477
4	(Italy) Renato Paratore	1,427
5	(France) Oïhan Guillamoundeguy	1,292
