= Hamish Brown (golfer) =

Danish professional golfer (born 1998)

Personal information
- Full name: Hamish William Brown
- Nationality: Denmark
- Born: 11 November 1998 (age 27) Aalborg, Denmark

Career
- Sport: Golf
- Turned professional: 2022
- Current tours: European Tour; Challenge Tour
- Former tour: Nordic Golf League
- Professional wins: 3

Number of wins by tour
- Challenge Tour: 3

Achievements and awards
- Challenge Tour Rankings winner: 2026

Hamish William Brown (born 11 November 1998) is a Danish professional golfer and European Tour player with two Challenge Tour wins.

== Early life ==
Brown was born in Aalborg in 1998. He was introduced to golf by his father Marcus, who hails from Perthshire, Scotland, and moved to Denmark in 1985 to become a club professional.

== Amateur career ==
Brown represented Denmark at the 2022 Eisenhower Trophy held at Le Golf National in France with Frederik Kjettrup and Rasmus Neergaard-Petersen, where they tied for 11th.

He appeared in the European Amateur Team Championship four times, winning the 2021 event at PGA Catalunya in Spain.

== Professional career ==
Brown turned professional mid-2022 and joined the Nordic Golf League, where he was runner-up at the PGA Championship Landeryd Masters, Esbjerg Open and Sydbank Road to Europe Final, to finish 7th in the season rankings and graduate to the Challenge Tour for 2023.

In 2024, Brown won the Kaskáda Golf Challenge and Hainan Open, and was runner-up at the Scottish Challenge, to finish 5th in the rankings and graduate to the European Tour.

As a rookie on the 2025 European Tour, he held a share of the 36-hole lead at the AfrAsia Bank Mauritius Open. He recorded a season-best finish of tied 8th at the Ras Al Khaimah Championship, after which he rose to 217th in the Official World Golf Ranking. Brown finished 136th in the season rankings and visited Q-School to secure category 20 membership for 2026.

== Amateur wins ==
- 2018 Barloseborg Elite Open
- 2019 DGU Elite Tour III, DGU Elite Tour Final
- 2020 Danish National Stroke Play Championship
- 2021 Dormy Elite Tour II - Wiibroe Cup

== Professional wins (3) ==
=== Challenge Tour wins (3) ===
No.	Date	Tournament	Winning score	Margin of victory	Runner-up
1	16 Jun 2024	Kaskáda Golf Challenge	−22 (64-69-70-63=266)	2 strokes	(South Africa) Robin Williams
2	13 Oct 2024	Hainan Open^{1}	−19 (66-70-67-66=269)	Playoff	(Philippines) Lloyd Jefferson Go
3	18 Oct 2026	Hangzhou Open^{1}	−21 (63-70-63-71=267)	1 stroke	(Denmark) Kristian Hjort Bressum

^{1}Co-sanctioned by the China Tour

Challenge Tour playoff record (1–1)

No.	Year	Tournament	Opponent	Result
1	2024	Hainan Open	(Philippines) Lloyd Jefferson Go	Won with birdie on first extra hole
2	2026	Challenge de Catalunya	(Spain) Pablo Ereño	Lost to par on second extra hole

== Team appearances ==
Amateur

- European Amateur Team Championship (representing Denmark): 2019, 2020, 2021 (winners), 2022
- European Nations Cup – Copa Sotogrande (representing Denmark): 2022
- Eisenhower Trophy (representing Denmark): 2022

== See also ==
- 2024 Challenge Tour graduates
- 2026 Challenge Tour graduates
