= Sebastián García Rodríguez =

Spanish professional golfer (born 1989)

Personal information
- Nationality: Spain
- Born: 4 March 1989 (age 37) Madrid, Spain
- Height: 1.70 m (5 ft 7 in)

Career
- Sport: Golf
- Turned professional: 2011
- Current tour: Challenge Tour
- Former tours: European Tour; Alps Tour
- Professional wins: 4

Number of wins by tour
- Challenge Tour: 1
- Other: 3

Sebastián García Rodríguez (born 4 March 1989) is a Spanish professional golfer who plays on the European Tour.

== Career ==
García enjoyed a successful 2019, beginning the year with two victories on the Alps Tour and ending it as a Challenge Tour graduate as he finished 15th on the Road to Mallorca Rankings to earn a maiden card for the European Tour. His best finishes on the Challenge Tour were runner-ups at the Challenge de España and the Open de Portugal.

On the 2020 European Tour, he led the Hero Open in England at the halfway point. He was 4th at the Austrian Open and tied 6th at the Portugal Masters, to finish 130th in the Race to Dubai.

On the 2021 European Tour, he held the overnight lead after an opening round of 64 at the BMW International Open in Germany, won by Viktor Hovland. He was 4th at the Magical Kenya Open, tied for 8th at the Tenerife Open, and tied 5th at the Mallorca Golf Open, to finish 120th in the Race to Dubai and narrowly keep his card.

== Professional wins (4) ==
=== Challenge Tour wins (1) ===
| No. | Date | Tournament | Winning score | Margin of victory | Runners-up |
|---|---|---|---|---|---|
| 1 | 19 Oct 2025 | Hangzhou Open^{1} | −17 (67-66-61-67=271) | Playoff | (Peru) Julián Périco, (Austria) Maximilian Steinlechner |

^{1}Co-sanctioned by the China Tour

Challenge Tour playoff record (1–0)

| No. | Year | Tournament | Opponents | Result |
|---|---|---|---|---|
| 1 | 2025 | Hangzhou Open | (Peru) Julián Périco, (Austria) Maximilian Steinlechner | Won with par on second extra hole Steinlechner eliminated by par on first hole |

=== Alps Tour wins (3) ===
| No. | Date | Tournament | Winning score | Margin of victory | Runner-up |
|---|---|---|---|---|---|
| 1 | 7 May 2017 | Alps de Las Castillas | −13 (68-69-66=203) | Playoff | (Spain) Adri Arnaus (a) |
| 2 | 21 Apr 2019 | Abruzzo Open Dailies Total 1 | −19 (65-66-66=197) | 2 strokes | (Italy) Edoardo Lipparelli |
| 3 | 26 May 2019 | Memorial Giorgio Bordoni | −18 (68-66-64=198) | 1 stroke | (Italy) Edoardo Lipparelli |

== See also ==
- 2019 Challenge Tour graduates
- 2023 European Tour Qualifying School graduates
- 2025 Challenge Tour graduates
