= Ángel Ayora =

Spanish professional golfer (born 2004)

Personal information
- Full name: Ángel Ayora Fanegas
- Nationality: Spain
- Born: 3 October 2004 (age 22) Málaga, Spain

Career
- Sport: Golf
- Turned professional: 2023
- Current tour: European Tour
- Former tour: Challenge Tour
- Professional wins: 1

Number of wins by tour
- Challenge Tour: 1

Best results in major championships
- Masters Tournament: DNP
- PGA Championship: CUT: 2026
- U.S. Open: DNP
- The Open Championship: CUT: 2026

Ángel Ayora Fanegas (born 3 October 2004) is a Spanish professional golfer who plays on the European Tour.

== Early life and amateur career ==
Ayora was born on 3 October 2004 in Málaga, Spain. His father worked in the banquet hall business and his mother was a hairdresser. Ayora started playing golf at age five and two years later began training at La Cañada Golf Club in Cádiz, where Álvaro Quirós had previously trained. Aged 10, Ayora decided to focus on golf instead of tennis, which he also played at the time.

In 2022, Ayora finished second at the Spanish U18 International Championship. He received an invitation to the European Tour's Andalucía Masters in October 2022, which was his debut in a professional tournament. He made the cut and finished in tied-55th.

Ayora won the Copa Nacional Puerta de Hierro in October 2022. He won the Copa Baleares in December 2022, which moved him to 181st in the World Amateur Golf Ranking. Ayora recorded a six-stroke victory at the Portuguese International Amateur Championship in February 2023. This win saw him rise to 120th in the World Amateur Golf Ranking. Ayora represented Spain at the 2023 European Amateur Team Championship in July, where Spain defeated Denmark in the final.

== Professional career ==
Ayora turned professional after competing in the 2023 Eisenhower Trophy in October. He signed with agent Javier Ballesteros, eldest son of Seve Ballesteros, and became the first golfer to wear the Seve Collection clothing brand which bears Seve's logo. Prior to turning professional, Ayora had won the first stage of European Tour Qualifying School at Donnington Grove Golf Club. He missed the cut at final stage in November.

Starting the 2024 Challenge Tour season, Ayora had limited status. He recorded his first victory as a professional at the Rosa Challenge Tour in September, shooting 13-under to win by three strokes. This moved him to ninth in the Challenge Tour rankings. He finished runner-up at the Rolex Challenge Tour Grand Final in November to finish fourth in the rankings and secure promotion to the European Tour. In December 2024, it was announced that Ayora had rejected a two-year contract offer to join LIV Golf.

At the Italian Open in June 2025, Ayora held the outright lead after 36 holes. He ultimately finished tied-seventh. Ayora qualified for the season-ending DP World Tour Championship in November, where he finished tied-eighth. This was his tenth top-10 finish of the 2025 European Tour season. He narrowly missed out on the European Tour's Sir Henry Cotton Rookie of the Year award to Martin Couvra, who finished 19th in the seasonal rankings, one spot ahead of Ayora.

In January 2026, Ayora began working with Juan Carlos Ferrero as his performance coach. Ferrero had previously coached Spanish tennis player Carlos Alcaraz. Ayora made his major championship debut at the 2026 PGA Championship, where he missed the cut.

== Amateur wins ==
- 2022 Copa Nacional Puerta de Hierro, Copa Baleares
- 2023 Portuguese International Amateur Championship

== Professional wins (1) ==
=== Challenge Tour wins (1) ===
No.	Date	Tournament	Winning score	Margin of victory	Runner-up
1	1 Sep 2024	Rosa Challenge Tour	−13 (66-65-66-70=267)	3 strokes	(Northern Ireland) Dermot McElroy

== Results in major championships ==
Tournament	2026
Masters Tournament	
PGA Championship	CUT
U.S. Open	
The Open Championship	CUT

Did not play

CUT = missed the half-way cut
"T" = tied

== Team appearances ==
- European Boys' Team Championship (representing Spain): 2022
- European Amateur Team Championship (representing Spain): 2023 (winners)
- Eisenhower Trophy (representing Spain): 2023

== See also ==
- 2024 Challenge Tour graduates
