= Rasmus Neergaard-Petersen =

Danish professional golfer (born 1999)

Personal information
- Nickname: RNP
- Nationality: Denmark
- Born: 3 July 1999 (age 27) Nivå, Denmark
- Height: 5 ft 10 in (178 cm)

Career
- Sport: Golf
- College: Oklahoma State University
- Turned professional: 2023
- Current tours: European Tour; PGA Tour
- Former tour: Challenge Tour
- Professional wins: 4
- Highest ranking: 47 (18 January 2026) (as of 15 November 2026)

Number of wins by tour
- European Tour: 1
- PGA Tour of Australasia: 1
- Challenge Tour: 3

Best results in major championships
- Masters Tournament: CUT: 2026
- PGA Championship: T75: 2026
- U.S. Open: T12: 2025
- The Open Championship: T9: 2026

Achievements and awards
- Challenge Tour Rankings winner: 2024

Rasmus Neergaard-Petersen (born 3 July 1999) is a Danish professional golfer. In 2024, he won three times on the Challenge Tour and topped the rankings.

== Amateur career ==
Neergaard-Petersen had a successful amateur career and won the 2017 Danish Junior Championship, and the German International Amateur Championship back-to-back in 2018 and 2019. He was runner-up at the 2017 Duke of York Young Champions Trophy, and at the 2018 European Nations Cup – Copa Sotogrande. He lost the final of the 2020 Western Amateur to Pierceson Coody, 3 and 2, and was runner-up at the 2022 European Amateur.

Representing the Danish National Team he won the 2017 European Boys' Team Championship at La Manga Club in Spain, and finished 3rd at the 2022 European Amateur Team Championship, beating England in the Bronze match at Royal St George's Golf Club.

Neergaard-Petersen played college golf at Oklahoma State University 2018–2023 with the Oklahoma State Cowboys golf team, where he recorded two wins and was named All-American. He helped the International team win the 2022 Arnold Palmer Cup, with a 3–1 record paired with Fred Biondi and Chiara Tamburlini.

== Professional career ==
Neergaard-Petersen turned professional after graduating in 2023, and joined the Challenge Tour. He also made a handful of European Tour starts where in his debut, he held the lead at the BMW International Open in Munich, ultimately finishing in a tie for 7th.

In 2024, he won the Kolkata Challenge and the UAE Challenge, and was runner-up at the Challenge de España, all in the span of little over a month. He secured his third win of 2024 at the Big Green Egg German Challenge, earning him a promotion to the European Tour. With a tied-second finish at the Rolex Challenge Tour Grand Final in November, Neergaard-Petersen claimed the season-long rankings title.

On the 2025 European Tour, Neergaard-Petersen was runner-up at the Commercial Bank Qatar Masters and Puerto Rico Open on the PGA Tour, before securing his promotion to the 2026 PGA Tour as he birdied three of his last four holes in the final round of the DP World Tour Championship, where he tied for 3rd behind Matt Fitzpatrick and Rory McIlroy. Three weeks later in December, Neergaard-Petersen won the Crown Australian Open at Royal Melbourne for his first European Tour win, beating Cameron Smith by one shot.

== Amateur wins ==
- 2017 Santa Maria Furesøpokalen, Danish Junior Championship
- 2018 Kronborg Masters, German International Amateur Championship
- 2019 German International Amateur Championship
- 2020 Oklahoma Stroke Play Championship
- 2022 General Hackler Championship

== Professional wins (4) ==
=== European Tour wins (1) ===
No.	Date	Tournament	Winning score	Margin of victory	Runner-up
1	7 Dec 2025 (2026 season)	Crown Australian Open^{1}	−15 (67-66-66-70=269)	1 stroke	(Australia) Cameron Smith

^{1}Co-sanctioned by the PGA Tour of Australasia

=== Challenge Tour wins (3) ===
No.	Date	Tournament	Winning score	Margin of victory	Runner(s)-up
1	24 Mar 2024	Kolkata Challenge^{1}	−16 (68-65-68-71=272)	2 strokes	(England) David Horsey, (India) Rahil Gangjee
2	28 Apr 2024	UAE Challenge	−14 (65-72-70-67=274)	1 stroke	(South Africa) Wilco Nienaber
3	8 Sep 2024	Big Green Egg German Challenge	−15 (69-73-67-64=273)	1 stroke	(Denmark) John Axelsen, (Scotland) Daniel Young

^{1}Co-sanctioned by the Professional Golf Tour of India

== Results in major championships ==
Tournament	2025	2026
Masters Tournament		CUT
PGA Championship	CUT	T75
U.S. Open	T12	
The Open Championship		T9

Top 10
Did not play

CUT = missed the halfway cut
"T" = tied

== Team appearances ==
Amateur

- European Boys' Team Championship (representing Denmark): 2016, 2017 (winners)
- European Amateur Team Championship (representing Denmark): 2019, 2022
- Eisenhower Trophy (representing Denmark): 2022
- Arnold Palmer Cup (representing the International team): 2022 (winners)

Professional

- Team Cup (representing Continental Europe): 2025

== See also ==
- 2024 Challenge Tour graduates
- 2025 Race to Dubai dual card winners
- List of golfers to achieve a three-win promotion from the Challenge Tour
