= China Tour =

Men's professional golf tour

- Current season, competition or edition: 2026 China Tour
- Formerly: Moutai 1935 China Tour
- Sport: Golf
- Founded: 2014
- Founder: China Golf Association
- First season: 2014
- Country: Based in China (Note: Schedules also included events in Hong Kong.)
- Most titles: Tournament wins: (China) Zhou Yanhan (12)
- Related competitions: Omega China Tour; PGA Tour China; Volvo China Tour
- Website: http://competitions.cgagolf.org.cn/en

The China Tour is a China-based men's professional golf tour run by the China Golf Association.

== History ==
From 2014 to 2016 the tour was organised in conjunction with the PGA Tour China. In 2017 the two tours split and ran a separate schedule of events. Tournaments as part of the PGA Tour gained world ranking points from 2014 to 2016 but not in 2017. Events regained OWGR status in 2018. Since 2017, the Order of Merit winner has earnt a European Tour card for the following season.

In January 2024, it was announced by the European Tour that they had formalised their strategic alliance with the China Golf Association. The agreement would see the leading player on the China Tour Order of Merit earn status to play on the European Tour (DP World Tour) for the following season (which had already been in place since 2017). Additionally the next player on the Order of Merit would earn status to play on the Challenge Tour for the following season. The Volvo China Open was also confirmed as a co-sanctioned event for the 2024 season.

== Order of Merit winners ==
| Season | Winner | Points |
|---|---|---|
| 2025 | (China) Zhou Yanhan | 1,765 |
| Season | Winner | Prize money (CN¥) |
| 2024 | (China) Jin Zihao | 1,624,176 |
| 2023 | (China) Chen Guxin | 690,777 |
| 2022 | (China) Ma Chengyao | 279,808 |
| 2020–21 | (China) Zhang Huilin | 536,425 |
| 2019 | (Australia) Maverick Antcliff | 710,370 |
| 2018 | (United States) Charlie Saxon | 597,893 |
| 2017 | (South Korea) Cho Rak-hyun | 873,935 |
| 2016 | (China) Dou Zecheng | 1,144,350 |
| 2015 | (Australia) Bryden Macpherson | 769,960 |
| 2014 | (China) Li Haotong | 967,788 |
