= NÖ Open (golf) =

Austrian golf tournament

Haugschlag NÖ Open
Tournament information
- Location: Haugschlag, Austria
- Established: 2001
- Course: Golfresort Haugschlag
- Par: 71
- Length: 6,533 yards (5,974 m)
- Tours: Challenge Tour; Alps Tour; Pro Golf Tour
- Format: Stroke play
- Prize fund: €30,000
- Month played: April

Tournament record score
- Aggregate: 264 Rafa Cabrera-Bello (2006)
- To par: −16 as above

Current champion
- (Netherlands) Koen Kouwenaar

Location map
- Location in Austria

The NÖ Open is a men's professional golf tournament held in Austria, which is currently played on the Pro Golf Tour. It was founded in 2001 as an event on the third-tier Alps Tour, before moving onto the second tier Challenge Tour in 2006, replacing the Austrian Open, which had been promoted to the full European Tour schedule. It had usually been held at Golf Club Adamstal in Ramsau, but is now held at Golfresort Haugschlag in Haugschlag.

== Winners ==
Year	Tour (Note: ALP − Alps Tour; CHA − Challenge Tour; EPD/PGT − EPD Tour/Pro Golf Tour.)	Winner	Score	To par	Margin of victory	Runner(s)-up
Haugschlag NÖ Open
2026	PGT	(Netherlands) Koen Kouwenaar	202	−11	1 stroke	(Poland) Mateusz Gradecki
2025	PGT	(Germany) Nicolas Horder	197	−16	1 stroke	(Wales) Owen Edwards
2024	PGT	(France) Jean Bekirian	198	−15	2 strokes	(Belgium) Yente van Doren
2023	PGT	(Slovenia) Žan Luka Štirn	200	−13	1 stroke	(Czech Republic) Jan Cafourek
2022	PGT	(Netherlands) Dario Antonisse	200	−13	Playoff	(Netherlands) Max Albertus
2021	PGT	(Switzerland) Marco Iten	201	−12	1 stroke	(Switzerland) Luca Galliano (Austria) Niklas Regner (a)
2020	PGT	(Switzerland) Jeremy Freiburghaus	199	−17	1 stroke	(France) Jean Bekirian (Germany) Philipp Matlari (a)
2019	PGT	(Czech Republic) Jan Cafourek	204	−12	Playoff	(France) Jean Bekirian
2018	PGT	(France) Mathieu Decottignies-Lafon	204	−12	1 stroke	(Germany) David Heinzinger
2017	PGT	(Netherlands) Michael Kraaij	64 (Note: Shortened to 18 holes due to weather.)	−8	2 strokes	(France) Alexandre Kaleka
2016	PGT	(Czech Republic) Stanislav Matuš	198	−18	Playoff	(Scotland) Chris Robb
2015	PGT	(Switzerland) Benjamin Rusch	201	−15	1 stroke	(Germany) Philipp Mejow
2014	PGT	(Germany) Sean Einhaus	197	−19	8 strokes	(Germany) Marcel Schneider
2013	PGT	(Germany) Bernd Ritthammer	207	−9	2 strokes	(Germany) Florian Fritsch
2012	EPD	(Germany) Marcel Haremza	200	−16	7 strokes	(Germany) Max Kramer
2011	EPD	(Germany) Allen John	202	−14	Playoff	(Germany) Sebastian Bühl
2010	ALP	(England) Matthew Cryer	192	−24	7 strokes	(Switzerland) Jann Schmid
2009: No tournament
MAN NÖ Open
2008	CHA	(Switzerland) André Bossert	265	−15	Playoff	(Austria) Markus Brier
2007	CHA	(Denmark) Anders Schmidt Hansen	269	−11	3 strokes	(England) Zane Scotland
2006	CHA	(Spain) Rafa Cabrera-Bello	264	−16	2 strokes	(Austria) Niki Zitny
2005	ALP	(Austria) Markus Brier	204 (Note: Shortened to 54 holes due to weather.)	−6	1 stroke	(Spain) Francisco Valera
2004	ALP	(Austria) Niki Zitny	276	−4	2 strokes	(Italy) Massimo Scarpa (Austria) Markus Brier
Intersport EYBL NÖ Open
2003	ALP	(Switzerland) Alexandre Chopard	200	−16	1 stroke	(Austria) Markus Brier
Niederösterreich Open
2002	ALP	(Austria) Clemens Prader	274	−14	2 strokes	(Austria) Ulf Wendling
NÖ Open
2001	ALP	(Italy) Alessandro Napoleoni	206	−10	1 stroke	(Austria) Markus Brier
