= Mateusz Gradecki =

Polish professional golfer (born 1994)

Personal information
- Nationality: Poland
- Born: 4 June 1994 (age 32) Trzebnica, Poland
- Height: 6 ft 0 in (1.83 m)

Career
- Sport: Golf
- College: East Tennessee State University
- Turned professional: 2018
- Current tour: Challenge Tour
- Former tour: Pro Golf Tour
- Professional wins: 5

Number of wins by tour
- Sunshine Tour: 1
- Challenge Tour: 1
- Other: 4

Mateusz Gradecki (born 4 June 1994) is a Polish professional golfer who plays on the Challenge Tour. He won the 2022 Limpopo Championship, becoming the first Sunshine Tour winner and only the second Challenge Tour winner to hail from Poland.

== Amateur career ==
Gradecki was born in Trzebnica and grew up in Oborniki Śląskie. His father Krzysztof owned the Eko supermarket chain and has been featured on lists of the 100 richest Poles. He also built the Gradi Golf Club in Brzeźno, where his son practices. Gradecki attended East Tennessee State University from 2013 to 2017 and played with the East Tennessee State Buccaneers men's golf team alongside compatriot Adrian Meronk.

Gradecki represented Poland in the Eisenhower Trophy in 2012, 2014 and 2016. He won the Polish Amateur five times and finished third at the 2017 Wrocław Open.

== Professional career ==
Gradecki turned professional early 2018 and joined the Pro Golf Tour. In September, he won the New Golf Club Matchplay Championship in Germany and finished fifth in the Order of Merit to get promotion to the Challenge Tour. He had a disappointing rookie season and made only four cuts. Back on the Pro Golf Tour, he won the 2019 Open Prestigia and the 2021 Red Sea Egyptian Classic.

On the Challenge Tour again for the 2021 season, he finished 68th in the Challenge Tour Order of Merit to keep his card, after recording several top-10 finishes including a season best of tied 6th at the Sydbank Esbjerg Challenge.

In April 2022, Gradecki won the co-sanctioned Limpopo Championship in South Africa to become the first Pole to win on the Sunshine Tour, and only the second Challenge Tour winner to hail from Poland, after Adrian Meronk. In July, he lost a playoff at the German Challenge to Alejandro del Rey of Spain, who won with a birdie at the second playoff hole.

== Amateur wins ==
- 2011 Polish Amateur
- 2012 Polish Amateur
- 2013 Polish Amateur
- 2014 Faldo Series Poland
- 2015 Polish Amateur
- 2016 Polish Amateur
- 2017 MVK Turkish International Amateur Open Championship

== Professional wins (5) ==
=== Sunshine Tour wins (1) ===
No.	Date	Tournament	Winning score	Margin of victory	Runner-up
1	3 Apr 2022	Limpopo Championship^{1}	−19 (68-68-67-66=269)	3 strokes	(South Africa) Hennie du Plessis

^{1}Co-sanctioned by the Challenge Tour

=== Challenge Tour wins (1) ===
No.	Date	Tournament	Winning score	Margin of victory	Runner-up
1	3 Apr 2022	Limpopo Championship^{1}	−19 (68-68-67-66=269)	3 strokes	(South Africa) Hennie du Plessis

^{1}Co-sanctioned by the Sunshine Tour

Challenge Tour playoff record (0–1)

No.	Year	Tournament	Opponent	Result
1	2022	Big Green Egg German Challenge	(Spain) Alejandro del Rey	Lost to birdie on second extra hole

=== Pro Golf Tour wins (3) ===
No.	Date	Tournament	Winning score	Margin of victory	Runner(s)-up
1	5 Sep 2018	New Golf Club Matchplay Championship	1 up		(France) Baptiste Achard
2	4 Feb 2019	Open Prestigia	−14 (69-66-67=202)	1 stroke	(Germany) Allen John, (Germany) Hurly Long
3	15 Apr 2021	Red Sea Egyptian Classic	−12 (66-70-68=204)	2 strokes	(Netherlands) Mike Toorop

=== Other wins (1) ===
No.	Date	Tournament	Winning score	Margin of victory	Runners-up
1	10 Sep 2024	Penati Slovak Open	−9 (72-65=137)	1 stroke	(Czech Republic) Ondřej Lieser, (Czech Republic) Filip Mrůzek

== Team appearances ==
Amateur

- European Boys' Team Championship (representing Poland): 2009
- Eisenhower Trophy (representing Poland): 2012, 2014, 2016
- European Amateur Team Championship (representing Poland): 2015

Professional

- European Championships (representing Poland): 2018
