= Polish Open (golf) =

Golf tournament

Gradi Polish Open
Tournament information
- Location: Gdańsk, Poland
- Established: 1994
- Course: Gradi Golf Club
- Par: 70
- Length: 5,746 yards (5,254 m)
- Tours: Challenge Tour; Pro Golf Tour
- Format: Stroke play
- Prize fund: €35,000
- Month played: June

Tournament record score
- Aggregate: 273 José Manuel Lara (1998)
- To par: −11 as above

Current champion
- (Switzerland) Fiorino Clerici

Location map
- Location in Poland

The Polish Open is the oldest and most prestigious professional golf tournament in Poland. First played in 1994, from 1996 to 1999 it was included on the Challenge Tour, and subsequently on the Pro Golf Tour (formerly known as the EPD Tour).

In its capacity as a national open golf championship, starting with 1994 champion Gary Marks the winner earned qualification to the Sarazen World Open, an unofficial money event on the PGA Tour 1994–1999 featuring national open winners.

== Winners ==
Year	Tour (Note: CHA − Challenge Tour; EPD/PGT − EPD Tour/Pro Golf Tour.)	Winner	Score	To par	Margin of victory	Runner(s)-up	Venue	Ref.
Gradi Polish Open
2026	PGT	(Switzerland) Fiorino Clerici	194	−16	3 strokes	(France) Antoine Bachelier (Poland) Mateusz Gradecki (Germany) Philipp Macionga (Germany) Martin Obtmeier (Belgium) Kristof Ulenaers	Gradi	
2025	PGT	(Germany) Dennis Fuchs	196	−14	Playoff	(Belgium) Kristof Ulenaers	Gradi	
2024	PGT	(Switzerland) Cédric Gugler	184	−26	7 strokes	(France) Jean Bekirian (Belgium) Yente van Doren	Gradi	
2023	PGT	(France) Thomas Elissalde	193	−17	1 stroke	(Germany) Tom Büschges (Wales) Owen Edwards (Germany) Jan Schneider (a)	Gradi	
2022	PGT	(Germany) Michael Hirmer	197	−13	1 stroke	(Austria) Felix Schulz	Gradi	
2021	PGT	(Germany) Nick Bachem (a)	195	−15	1 stroke	(Switzerland) Marco Iten (Germany) Nico Lang (a)	Gradi	
2020	PGT	(France) Julien Brun	192	−18	2 strokes	(Switzerland) Jeremy Freiburghaus	Gradi	
Polish Open
2019	PGT	(Czech Republic) Ondřej Lieser	191	−19	7 strokes	(France) Félix Mory	Gradi	
2018	PGT	(France) Mathieu Decottignies-Lafon	192	−18	Playoff	(Czech Republic) Ondřej Lieser	Gradi	
Sierra Polish Open
2017	PGT	(Germany) Nicolai von Dellingshausen	201	−15	1 stroke	(Scotland) Chris Robb	Sierra	
Lotos Polish Open
2016	PGT	(Germany) Hinrich Arkenau	205	−11	Playoff	(Germany) Sascha Schmidt	Sierra	
2015	PGT	(Germany) Martin Keskari	211	−5	1 stroke	(France) David Antonelli (Germany) Stephan Gross	Sierra	
2014	PGT	(Austria) Berni Reiter	206	−10	3 strokes	(Germany) Sean Einhaus	Sand Valley	
2013	PGT	(Germany) Florian Fritsch	207	−9	Playoff	(Germany) Anton Kirstein	Sand Valley	
Polish Open
2009–2012: No tournament
2008		(United States) Peter Bronson (2)			Playoff	(England) Grant Jackson	Rosa Private	
2007	EPD	(Netherlands) Taco Remkes	278	−10	1 stroke	(Switzerland) Damian Ulrich	Postołowo	
Xelion Polish Open
2006		(England) Tim Spence	281	−7	5 strokes	(England) Matt Green	Kraków Valley	
2005		(United States) Peter Bronson	213	E	Playoff	(Australia) John Bleys (Sweden) Jonathan Fransson (England) Matt Green	First Warsaw	
Polish Open
2004		(Australia) Dale Harris					Binowo Park	
2003		(United States) James Bray					Binowo Park	
2000–2002: No tournament
Daewoo Warsaw Golf Open
1999	CHA	(Sweden) Niclas Fasth	280	−4	1 stroke	(South Africa) Hennie Otto	First Warsaw	
Warsaw Golf Open
1998	CHA	(Spain) José Manuel Lara	273	−11	2 strokes	(Sweden) Raimo Sjöberg	First Warsaw	
Polish Open
1997	CHA	Abandoned (Note: Tournament abandoned due to rain.)						
Bank Pekao Polish Open
1996	CHA	(Germany) Erol Şimşek	282	−6	1 stroke	(Sweden) Dennis Edlund (France) Christophe Pottier	First Warsaw	
Polish Open
1995		(England) Mark Dewdney					Amber Baltic	
1994		(England) Gary Marks					Amber Baltic	

== See also ==
- Open golf tournament
