= Nick Bachem =

German professional golfer (born 1999)

Personal information
- Nationality: Germany
- Born: 27 September 1999 (age 27) Cologne, Germany

Career
- Sport: Golf
- Turned professional: 2021
- Current tour: European Tour
- Former tours: Challenge Tour; Pro Golf Tour
- Professional wins: 5

Number of wins by tour
- European Tour: 1
- Sunshine Tour: 1
- Other: 4

Nick Bachem (born 27 September 1999) is a German professional golfer who plays on the European Tour. He claimed his first European Tour victory in his rookie season at the Jonsson Workwear Open. He also won three times on the Pro Golf Tour as an amateur.

== Amateur career ==
Bachem played on the Pro Golf Tour as an amateur in 2020 and 2021. He claimed his first professional victory in March 2020 at the Open Royal Golf Anfa Mohammedia in Morocco.

Bachem was member of the winning German team at the 2020 European Amateur Team Championship in the Netherlands, beating defending champions Sweden in the final.

In September 2020, Bachem finished runner-up in the European Amateur; three shots behind Matti Schmid.

Bachem added two more professional victories in 2021; in April at the Red Sea Ain Sokhna Classic in Egypt and in July at the Gradi Polish Open.

== Professional career ==
Bachem turned professional in 2021. Having gained promotion from the Pro Golf Tour in 2021, he played on the Challenge Tour in 2022. His best finish was a tie for second at the Frederikshavn Challenge in August. He qualified for the 2023 European Tour season via Q-School in November 2022.

Bachem claimed his maiden victory on the European Tour in March 2023 at the Jonsson Workwear Open in South Africa. He shot a final-round 64 to win by four shots ahead of Hennie du Plessis and Zander Lombard.

== Amateur wins ==
- 2016 Fairhaven Trophy
- 2018 German Match Play, German National Amateur

== Professional wins (5) ==
=== European Tour wins (1) ===
No.	Date	Tournament	Winning score	Margin of victory	Runners-up
1	26 Mar 2023	Jonsson Workwear Open^{1}	−24 (65-66-69-64=264)	4 strokes	(South Africa) Hennie du Plessis, (South Africa) Zander Lombard

^{1}Co-sanctioned by the Sunshine Tour

=== Pro Golf Tour wins (3) ===
No.	Date	Tournament	Winning score	Margin of victory	Runner(s)-up
1	5 Mar 2020	Open Royal Golf Anfa Mohammedia (as an amateur)	−4 (67-71-72=210)	Playoff	(Scotland) Chris Maclean
2	20 Apr 2021	Red Sea Ain Sokhna Classic (as an amateur)	−13 (66-67-70=203)	2 strokes	(Belgium) Kristof Ulenaers
3	2 Jul 2021	Gradi Polish Open (as an amateur)	−15 (63-64-68=195)	1 stroke	(Switzerland) Marco Iten, (Germany) Nico Lang (a)

=== Toro Tour wins (1) ===
No.	Date	Tournament	Winning score	Margin of victory	Runners-up
1	2 Feb 2022	Atalaya Golf 2	−27 (60-61-65=186)	10 strokes	(Germany) Jannik de Bruyn, (Germany) Timo Vahlenkamp

== Team appearances ==
Amateur

- European Boys' Team Championship (representing Germany): 2016, 2017
- European Amateur Team Championship (representing Germany): 2020 (winners), 2021

== See also ==
- 2022 European Tour Qualifying School graduates
