= David Law (golfer) =

Scottish golfer

Personal information
- Full name: David Connor James Law
- Nationality: Scotland
- Born: 4 May 1991 (age 35) Aberdeen, Scotland

Career
- Sport: Golf
- Turned professional: 2011
- Current tour: Challenge Tour
- Former tours: European Tour; Pro Golf Tour; MENA Tour
- Professional wins: 9

Number of wins by tour
- European Tour: 1
- PGA Tour of Australasia: 1
- Challenge Tour: 3
- Other: 5

Best results in major championships
- Masters Tournament: DNP
- PGA Championship: DNP
- U.S. Open: DNP
- The Open Championship: T72: 2022

David Connor James Law (born 4 May 1991) is a Scottish professional golfer who plays on the European Tour. He won the 2018 SSE Scottish Hydro Challenge on the Challenge Tour and had his first European Tour victory, the ISPS Handa Vic Open, in early 2019.

== Amateur career ==
In 2009 Law won two important match-play titles, the Scottish Amateur and the Scottish Boys Amateur Championship. He won the Scottish Amateur for a second time in 2011. Law was not selected for the 2011 Walker Cup at Royal Aberdeen Golf Club despite his win in the Scottish Amateur. Soon after the selection of the Walker Cup team, Law won the Northern Open, the first amateur to win the event since 1970.

== Professional career ==
Law turned professional in late 2011. He won the 2013 Sueno Dunes Classic on the Pro Golf Tour and finished fifth in the Order of Merit to earn a place on the Challenge Tour for 2014. Since 2014 he has played primarily on the Challenge Tour combined with some appearances on the Pro Golf Tour and the MENA Golf Tour. He had limited success on the Challenge Tour until he won the SSE Scottish Hydro Challenge at Macdonald Spey Valley in June 2018. He followed this by being runner-up in the Euram Bank Open in July and finished the season 14th in the Challenge Tour Order of Merit to earn a place on the European Tour for 2019.

Law won his maiden European Tour title in February 2019, at the ISPS Handa Vic Open, a co-sanctioned event with the PGA Tour of Australasia. He won by a one stroke margin after entering the final three holes three strokes behind. Law birdied the 16th and eagled the final hole, this coupled with Wade Ormsby double bogeying his penultimate hole, led to Law claiming victory.

== Amateur wins ==
- 2009 Scottish Amateur, Scottish Boys Amateur Championship
- 2011 Northern Amateur (South Africa), Scottish Amateur

== Professional wins (9) ==
=== European Tour wins (1) ===
No.	Date	Tournament	Winning score	Margin of victory	Runners-up
1	10 Feb 2019	ISPS Handa Vic Open^{1}	−18 (67-66-71-66=270)	1 stroke	(Australia) Brad Kennedy, (Australia) Wade Ormsby

^{1}Co-sanctioned by the PGA Tour of Australasia

=== Challenge Tour wins (3) ===
No.	Date	Tournament	Winning score	Margin of victory	Runner(s)-up
1	24 Jun 2018	SSE Scottish Hydro Challenge	−11 (66-69-71-67=273)	2 strokes	(Denmark) Joachim B. Hansen
2	13 Jul 2025	D+D Real Czech Challenge	−22 (71-62-62-63=258)	2 strokes	(England) Jack Floydd, (Scotland) Ryan Lumsden, (Austria) Maximilian Steinlechner, (Denmark) Victor Sidal Svendsen
3	17 Aug 2025	Vierumäki Finnish Challenge	−17 (65-68-70-68=271)	2 strokes	(Sweden) Jonas Blixt, (England) Alfie Plant

=== Pro Golf Tour wins (2) ===
No.	Date	Tournament	Winning score	Margin of victory	Runner(s)-up
1	17 Apr 2012	Open Dar Es Salam	−3 (73-73-70=216)	1 stroke	(Czech Republic) Marek Nový
2	29 Jan 2013	Sueno Dunes Classic	−8 (62-65-72=199)	1 stroke	(Netherlands) Floris de Haas, (Netherlands) Daan Huizing, (Germany) Benjamin Miarka

=== MENA Golf Tour wins (1) ===
No.	Date	Tournament	Winning score	Margin of victory	Runner-up
1	6 Apr 2016	Sotogrande Masters	−7 (74-67-68=209)	6 strokes	(England) Zane Scotland

=== Other wins (2) ===
- 2011 Northern Open (as an amateur)
- 2014 Northern Open

== Results in major championships ==
Tournament	2022
Masters Tournament	
PGA Championship	
U.S. Open	
The Open Championship	T72

Did not play

"T" = tied

== Team appearances ==
Amateur

- European Boys Team Championship (representing Scotland): 2008, 2009
- European Amateur Team Championship (representing Scotland): 2011

== See also ==
- 2018 Challenge Tour graduates
- 2025 Challenge Tour graduates
