= 2012 EPD Tour =

Golf tour season

2012 EPD Tour season
- Duration: 19 January 2012 – 30 September 2012
- Number of official events: 20
- Most wins: (Germany) Marcel Haremza (4)
- Order of Merit: (Germany) Marcel Haremza

The 2012 EPD Tour was the 16th season of the EPD Tour, a third-tier tour recognised by the European Tour.

== Schedule ==
The following table lists official events during the 2012 season.

Date	Tournament	Host country	Purse (€)	Winner (Note: The number in brackets after each winner's name is the number of EPD Tour events they had won up to and including that tournament. It is rare for someone to accumulate many wins on the EPD Tour as success at this level usually leads to promotion to the Challenge Tour.)
21 Jan	Gloria New Course Classic	Turkey	30,000	(Germany) Maximilian Glauert (3)
25 Jan	Gloria Old Course Classic	Turkey	30,000	(Germany) Björn Stromsky (1)
31 Jan	Sueno Dunes Classic	Turkey	30,000	(Austria) Florian Pogatschnigg (1)
4 Feb	Sueno Pines Classic	Turkey	30,000	(Germany) Daniel Wünsche (5)
22 Feb	Open Mogador	Morocco	30,000	(United States) Timothy O'Neal (1)
28 Feb	Al Maaden Classic	Morocco	30,000	(Germany) Marcel Haremza (9)
3 Mar	Amelkis Classic	Morocco	30,000	(France) Damien Perrier (1)
11 Apr	Open Madaef	Morocco	30,000	(United States) Timothy O'Neal (2)
17 Apr	Open Dar Es Salam	Morocco	30,000	(Scotland) David Law (1)
23 Apr	Open Lixus	Morocco	30,000	(Germany) Björn Stromsky (2)
24 May	Haugschlag NÖ Open	Austria	30,000	(Germany) Marcel Haremza (10)
7 Jun	Land Fleesensee Classic	Germany	30,000	(Denmark) Christian Baunsøe (1)
17 Jun	Schloss Moyland Golfresort Classic	Germany	30,000	(Germany) Yannick Gumowski (1)
11 Jul	Bayreuth Open	Germany	30,000	(Germany) Moritz Lampert (a) (1)
18 Jul	Bad Waldsee Classic	Germany	30,000	(France) David Antonelli (1)
8 Aug	Castanea Resort Open	Germany	30,000	(Germany) Marcel Haremza (11)
22 Aug	Golfspielen.de Open	Germany	30,000	(Germany) Christoph Günther (10)
28 Aug	Preis des Hardenberg GolfResort	Germany	30,000	(Germany) Marcel Haremza (12)
16 Sep	Deutsche Bank Wrocław Open	Poland	30,000	(Germany) Stephan Wolters (1)
30 Sep	Fulda EPD Tour Championship	Germany	50,000	(Germany) Constantin Schwierz (2)

== Order of Merit ==
The Order of Merit was based on prize money won during the season, calculated in Euros. The top five players on the Order of Merit earned status to play on the 2013 Challenge Tour.

Position	Player	Prize money (€)	Status earned
1	(Germany) Marcel Haremza	26,362	Promoted to Challenge Tour
2	(Germany) Daniel Wünsche	22,921	Promoted to Challenge Tour
3	(Germany) Max Kramer	21,740	Promoted to Challenge Tour
4	(France) Damien Perrier	20,723	Promoted to Challenge Tour
5	(Czech Republic) Marek Nový	17,987	Promoted to Challenge Tour
6	(Germany) Christoph Günther	16,586	
7	(Germany) Björn Stromsky	15,304	
8	(Germany) Sebastian Heisele	15,291	
9	(Portugal) Tiago Cruz	14,773	
10	(Switzerland) Ken Benz	14,272	
