= Golf at the 2020 Summer Olympics – Men's individual =

Men's golf at the Games of the XXXII Olympiad
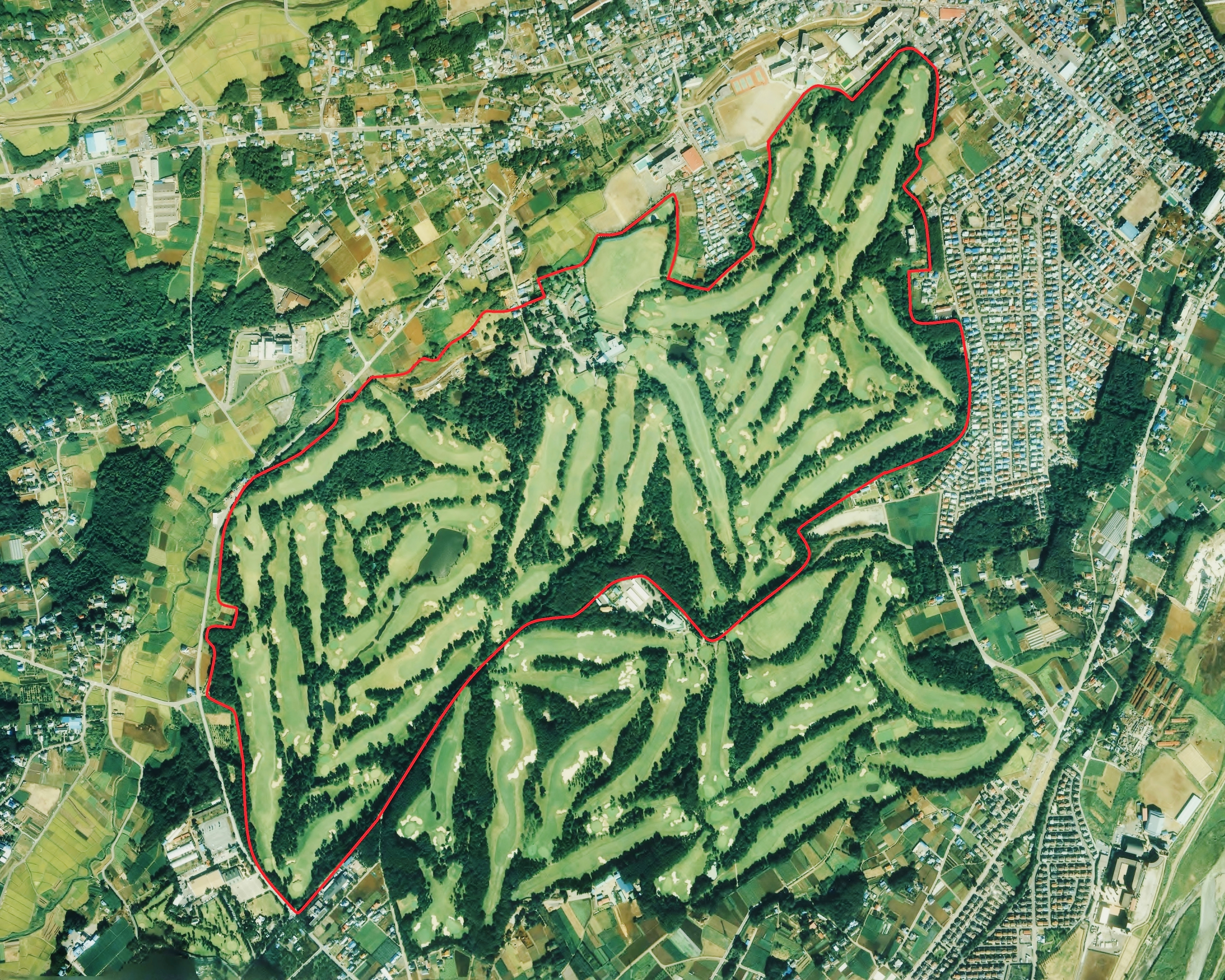
- Golf course at Kasumigaseki Country Club
- Venue: Kasumigaseki Country Club
- Dates: 29 July – 1 August 2021
- Competitors: 60 from 35 nations
- Winning score: 266 (−18)

Medalists
| 1st place, gold medalist(s) | | Xander Schauffele | United States |
| 2nd place, silver medalist(s) | | Rory Sabbatini | Slovakia |
| 3rd place, bronze medalist(s) | | Pan Cheng-tsung | Chinese Taipei |

The men's individual golf event at the 2020 Summer Olympics was held from 29 July to 1 August 2021 at the Kasumigaseki Country Club. 60 golfers from 35 nations competed in the event, which was won by Xander Schauffele of the United States.

== Background ==
The first Olympic golf tournaments took place at the second modern Games in Paris 1900. Men's and women's events were held. Golf was featured again at the next Games, St. Louis 1904 with men's events (an individual tournament as well as a team event). The 1908 Games in London were also supposed to have a golf competition, but a dispute led to a boycott by all of the host nation's golfers, leaving only a single international competitor and resulting in the cancellation of the event. Golf would disappear from the Olympic programme from then until returning to the 2016 Summer Olympics in Rio de Janeiro.

== Qualification ==
Each country could qualify from one to four golfers based on the World Rankings of 21 June 2021. The top 60 golfers, subject to limits per nation and guarantees for the host and continental representation, were selected. A nation could have three or four golfers if they are all in the top 15 of the rankings; otherwise, each nation was limited to two golfers. One spot was guaranteed for the host nation Japan and five spots were guaranteed to ensure that each Olympic continent has at least one representative.

== Competition format ==
Following the format used when golf was returned to the Olympic programme in 2016, the tournament is a four-round stroke play tournament, with the lowest score over the total 72 holes winning.

== Schedule ==
As with most major stroke play tournaments, the event is held over four days (Thursday through Sunday) with each golfer playing one round (18 holes) per day.

All times are Japan Standard Time (UTC+9)

| Date | Time | Round |
|---|---|---|
| Thursday, 29 July 2021 | 7:30 | First round |
| Friday, 30 July 2021 | 7:30 | Second round |
| Saturday, 31 July 2021 | 9:30 | Third round |
| Sunday, 1 August 2021 | 7:30 | Final round |

== Results ==
=== First round ===
Thursday, 29 July 2021

Austria's Sepp Straka birdied three consecutive holes on his back-nine and finished with a bogey-free round of 63 (−8) to take the first-round lead. A shot behind was Jazz Janewattananond of Thailand, who also did not make a bogey in a seven-under round of 64. Belgium's Thomas Pieters holed out from the fairway for eagle on the par-four 11th hole and shot 65, tied with Carlos Ortiz in third place and two shots behind.

Reigning Open champion Collin Morikawa, at World No. 3 the highest-ranked player in the field, opened with 69 (−2). Masters champion Hideki Matsuyama was four-under on his round through eight holes but made two bogeys to fall back to two-under.

| Rank | Player | Nation | Score | To par |
|---|---|---|---|---|
| 1 | Sepp Straka | Austria | 63 | −8 |
| 2 | Jazz Janewattananond | Thailand | 64 | −7 |
| T3 | Carlos Ortiz | Mexico | 65 | −6 |
| T3 | Thomas Pieters | Belgium | 65 | −6 |
| T5 | Joachim B. Hansen | Denmark | 66 | −5 |
| T5 | Juvic Pagunsan | Philippines | 66 | −5 |
| T5 | Jhonattan Vegas | Venezuela | 66 | −5 |
| T8 | Paul Casey | Great Britain | 67 | −4 |
| T8 | Anirban Lahiri | India | 67 | −4 |
| T8 | Sebastián Muñoz | Colombia | 67 | −4 |
| T8 | Alex Norén | Sweden | 67 | −4 |

=== Second round ===
Friday, 30 July 2021
Saturday, 31 July 2021

Thunderstorms caused delays in play and 16 players did not complete the second round on Friday. American Xander Schauffele was the overnight leader after shooting an 8-under-par 63. He held a one stroke lead over Carlos Ortiz of Mexico.

| Rank | Player | Nation | Score | To par |
|---|---|---|---|---|
| 1 | Xander Schauffele | United States | 68-63=131 | −11 |
| 2 | Carlos Ortiz | Mexico | 65-67=132 | −10 |
| 3 | Hideki Matsuyama | Japan | 69-64=133 | −9 |
| T4 | Alex Norén | Sweden | 67-67=134 | −8 |
| T4 | Mito Pereira | Chile | 69-65=134 | −8 |
| T4 | Sepp Straka | Austria | 63-71=134 | −8 |
| T7 | Paul Casey | Great Britain | 67-68=135 | −7 |
| T7 | Jazz Janewattananond | Thailand | 64-71=135 | −7 |
| T7 | Shane Lowry | Ireland | 70-65=135 | −7 |
| T7 | Rory McIlroy | Ireland | 69-66=135 | −7 |

=== Third round ===
Saturday, 31 July 2021

| Rank | Player | Nation | Score | To par |
|---|---|---|---|---|
| 1 | Xander Schauffele | United States | 68-63-68=199 | −14 |
| 2 | Hideki Matsuyama | Japan | 69-64-67=200 | −13 |
| T3 | Paul Casey | Great Britain | 67-68-66=201 | −12 |
| T3 | Carlos Ortiz | Mexico | 65-67-69=201 | −12 |
| T5 | Rory McIlroy | Ireland | 69-66-67=202 | −11 |
| T5 | Sebastián Muñoz | Colombia | 67-69-66=202 | −11 |
| T5 | Mito Pereira | Chile | 69-65-68=202 | −11 |
| T5 | Sepp Straka | Austria | 63-71-68=202 | −11 |
| T9 | Tommy Fleetwood | Great Britain | 70-69-64=203 | −10 |
| T9 | Shane Lowry | Ireland | 70-65-68=203 | −10 |

=== Final round ===
Sunday, 1 August 2021

Pan Cheng-tsung won the bronze medal after a seven-man sudden death playoff after Collin Morikawa was eliminated by par on the fourth extra hole. Rory McIlroy, Sebastián Muñoz, and Mito Pereira were all eliminated by birdie on the third extra hole, and Paul Casey and Hideki Matsuyama were both eliminated by par on the first extra hole.

| Rank | Player | Nation | Rd 1 | Rd 2 | Rd 3 | Rd 4 | Total | To par |
|---|---|---|---|---|---|---|---|---|
| 1st place, gold medalist(s) | Xander Schauffele | United States | 68 | 63 | 68 | 67 | 266 | −18 |
| 2nd place, silver medalist(s) | Rory Sabbatini | Slovakia | 69 | 67 | 70 | 61 | 267 | −17 |
| 3rd place, bronze medalist(s) | Pan Cheng-tsung | Chinese Taipei | 74 | 66 | 66 | 63 | 269 | −15 |
| T4 | Paul Casey | Great Britain | 67 | 68 | 66 | 68 | 269 | −15 |
| T4 | Hideki Matsuyama | Japan | 69 | 64 | 67 | 69 | 269 | −15 |
| T4 | Rory McIlroy | Ireland | 69 | 66 | 67 | 67 | 269 | −15 |
| T4 | Collin Morikawa | United States | 69 | 70 | 67 | 63 | 269 | −15 |
| T4 | Sebastián Muñoz | Colombia | 67 | 69 | 66 | 67 | 269 | −15 |
| T4 | Mito Pereira | Chile | 69 | 65 | 68 | 67 | 269 | −15 |
| T10 | Joaquín Niemann | Chile | 70 | 69 | 66 | 65 | 270 | −14 |
| T10 | Cameron Smith | Australia | 71 | 67 | 66 | 66 | 270 | −14 |
| T10 | Sepp Straka | Austria | 63 | 71 | 68 | 68 | 270 | −14 |
| 13 | Corey Conners | Canada | 69 | 71 | 66 | 65 | 271 | −13 |
| T14 | Abraham Ancer | Mexico | 69 | 69 | 66 | 68 | 272 | −12 |
| T14 | Viktor Hovland | Norway | 68 | 69 | 71 | 64 | 272 | −12 |
| T16 | Christiaan Bezuidenhout | South Africa | 68 | 70 | 68 | 67 | 273 | −11 |
| T16 | Tommy Fleetwood | Great Britain | 70 | 69 | 64 | 70 | 273 | −11 |
| T16 | Alex Norén | Sweden | 67 | 67 | 72 | 67 | 273 | −11 |
| T16 | Thomas Pieters | Belgium | 65 | 76 | 64 | 68 | 273 | −11 |
| T16 | Jhonattan Vegas | Venezuela | 66 | 70 | 70 | 67 | 273 | −11 |
| T16 | Scott Vincent | Zimbabwe | 73 | 67 | 66 | 67 | 273 | −11 |
| T22 | Thomas Detry | Belgium | 70 | 67 | 68 | 69 | 274 | −10 |
| T22 | Im Sung-jae | South Korea | 70 | 73 | 63 | 68 | 274 | −10 |
| T22 | Shane Lowry | Ireland | 70 | 65 | 68 | 71 | 274 | −10 |
| T22 | Patrick Reed | United States | 68 | 71 | 70 | 65 | 274 | −10 |
| T22 | Justin Thomas | United States | 71 | 70 | 68 | 65 | 274 | −10 |
| T27 | Joachim B. Hansen | Denmark | 66 | 73 | 67 | 69 | 275 | −9 |
| T27 | Jazz Janewattananond | Thailand | 64 | 71 | 72 | 68 | 275 | −9 |
| T27 | Renato Paratore | Italy | 71 | 70 | 67 | 67 | 275 | −9 |
| T27 | Matthias Schwab | Austria | 69 | 69 | 70 | 67 | 275 | −9 |
| T27 | Sami Välimäki | Finland | 70 | 70 | 68 | 67 | 275 | −9 |
| T32 | Kim Si-woo | South Korea | 68 | 71 | 70 | 67 | 276 | −8 |
| T32 | Guido Migliozzi | Italy | 71 | 65 | 68 | 72 | 276 | −8 |
| T32 | Wu Ashun | China | 72 | 71 | 67 | 66 | 276 | −8 |
| T35 | Romain Langasque | France | 69 | 70 | 69 | 69 | 277 | −7 |
| T35 | Hurly Long | Germany | 70 | 70 | 70 | 67 | 277 | −7 |
| T35 | Fabrizio Zanotti | Paraguay | 73 | 67 | 68 | 69 | 277 | −7 |
| T38 | Adri Arnaus | Spain | 68 | 69 | 74 | 67 | 278 | −6 |
| T38 | Rasmus Højgaard | Denmark | 73 | 68 | 66 | 71 | 278 | −6 |
| T38 | Rikuya Hoshino | Japan | 71 | 68 | 73 | 66 | 278 | −6 |
| T38 | Yuan Yechun | China | 69 | 68 | 70 | 71 | 278 | −6 |
| T42 | Ryan Fox | New Zealand | 70 | 72 | 73 | 64 | 279 | −5 |
| T42 | Anirban Lahiri | India | 67 | 72 | 68 | 72 | 279 | −5 |
| T42 | Carlos Ortiz | Mexico | 65 | 67 | 69 | 78 | 279 | −5 |
| T45 | Gunn Charoenkul | Thailand | 71 | 71 | 71 | 67 | 280 | −4 |
| T45 | Maximilian Kieffer | Germany | 73 | 69 | 67 | 71 | 280 | −4 |
| T45 | Henrik Norlander | Sweden | 68 | 73 | 72 | 67 | 280 | −4 |
| T45 | Antoine Rozner | France | 68 | 69 | 73 | 70 | 280 | −4 |
| T45 | Kalle Samooja | Finland | 75 | 68 | 70 | 67 | 280 | −4 |
| 50 | Mackenzie Hughes | Canada | 69 | 72 | 65 | 75 | 281 | −3 |
| T51 | Marc Leishman | Australia | 70 | 71 | 72 | 69 | 282 | −2 |
| T51 | Adrian Meronk | Poland | 72 | 71 | 69 | 70 | 282 | −2 |
| T53 | Garrick Higgo | South Africa | 71 | 71 | 70 | 72 | 284 | E |
| T53 | Kristian Krogh Johannessen | Norway | 72 | 70 | 71 | 71 | 284 | E |
| 55 | Juvic Pagunsan | Philippines | 66 | 73 | 76 | 70 | 285 | +1 |
| 56 | Udayan Mane | India | 76 | 69 | 70 | 72 | 287 | +3 |
| T57 | Rafael Campos | Puerto Rico | 73 | 73 | 70 | 72 | 288 | +4 |
| T57 | Gavin Green | Malaysia | 74 | 72 | 70 | 72 | 288 | +4 |
| 59 | Jorge Campillo | Spain | 70 | 75 | 69 | 75 | 289 | +5 |
| 60 | Ondřej Lieser | Czech Republic | 72 | 77 | 73 | 72 | 294 | +10 |

The medals for the competition were presented by Sir Craig Reedie, United Kingdom; IOC Member, and the medalists' bouquets were presented by Jay Monahan, United States; IGF Chairman.
