= 2019 Pro Golf Tour =

Golf tour season

2019 Pro Golf Tour season
- Duration: 14 January 2019 – 1 October 2019
- Number of official events: 21
- Most wins: (Finland) Sami Välimäki (4)
- Order of Merit: (Germany) Hurly Long

The 2019 Pro Golf Tour was the 23rd season of the Pro Golf Tour (formerly the EPD Tour), a third-tier tour recognised by the European Tour.

== Schedule ==
The following table lists official events during the 2019 season.

Date	Tournament	Host country	Purse (€)	Winner (Note: The number in brackets after each winner's name is the number of Pro Golf Tour events they had won up to and including that tournament. It is rare for someone to accumulate many wins on the Pro Golf Tour as success at this level usually leads to promotion to the Challenge Tour.)	OWGR points
16 Jan	Red Sea Egyptian Classic	Egypt	30,000	(Germany) Hinrich Arkenau (5)	4
22 Jan	Red Sea Ain Sokhna Classic	Egypt	30,000	(France) Stanislas Gautier (2)	4
4 Feb	Open Prestigia	Morocco	30,000	(Poland) Mateusz Gradecki (2)	4
8 Feb	Open Casa Green Golf	Morocco	30,000	(Finland) Sami Välimäki (1)	4
14 Feb	Open Palmeraie Country Club	Morocco	30,000	(Scotland) Kevin Duncan (1)	4
4 Mar	Open Madaef Golfs	Morocco	30,000	(Germany) Moritz Lampert (4)	4
8 Mar	Open Royal Golf Anfa Mohammedia	Morocco	30,000	(France) Édouard Dubois (1)	4
29 Mar	Open Ocean	Morocco	30,000	(England) James Wilson (1)	4
4 Apr	Open Tazegzout	Morocco	30,000	(Germany) Sebastian Heisele (4)	4
10 Apr	Open Michlifen	Morocco	30,000	(Germany) Allen John (3)	4
25 Apr	Haugschlag NÖ Open	Austria	30,000	(Czech Republic) Jan Cafourek (1)	4
11 May	EXTEC Trophy	Czech Republic	30,000	(Germany) Finn Fleer (2)	4
3 Jun	KUHN Maßkonfektion Open	Germany	30,000	(Netherlands) Robbie van West (3)	4
19 Jun	Czech Classic	Czech Republic	30,000	(Czech Republic) Vítek Novák (a) (1)	4
27 Jun	Polish Open	Poland	30,000	(Czech Republic) Ondřej Lieser (2)	4
2 Jul	Leipziger Golf Open	Germany	30,000	(Netherlands) Dylan Boshart (2)	4
12 Jul	Broekpolder International Open	Netherlands	30,000	(France) Hubert Tisserand (1)	4
25 Jul	Raiffeisen Pro Golf Tour St. Pölten	Austria	30,000	(Germany) Hurly Long (1)	4
17 Aug	Starnberg Open	Germany	30,000	(Finland) Sami Välimäki (2)	4
24 Aug	EXTEC CzechOne Open	Czech Republic	30,000	(Finland) Sami Välimäki (3)	4
1 Oct	Castanea Resort Championship	Germany	50,000	(Finland) Sami Välimäki (4)	4

== Order of Merit ==
The Order of Merit was based on tournament results during the season, calculated using a points-based system. The top five players on the Order of Merit (not otherwise exempt) earned status to play on the 2020 Challenge Tour.

Position	Player	Points	Status earned
1	(Germany) Hurly Long	28,999	Qualified for Challenge Tour (made cut in Q School)
2	(Finland) Sami Välimäki	28,427	Qualified for European Tour (Top 25 in Q School)
3	(Netherlands) Robbie van West	22,502	Qualified for Challenge Tour (made cut in Q School)
4	(Germany) Allen John	21,165	Promoted to Challenge Tour
5	(Czech Republic) Ondřej Lieser	18,553	Promoted to Challenge Tour
6	(Germany) Hinrich Arkenau	17,392	Promoted to Challenge Tour
7	(Switzerland) Benjamin Rusch	16,504	Promoted to Challenge Tour
8	(France) Félix Mory	16,446	Promoted to Challenge Tour
9	(Germany) Finn Fleer	14,893	
10	(France) Stanislas Gautier	14,374	
