= Sebastian Heisele =

German professional golfer

Personal information
- Nationality: Germany
- Born: 8 August 1988 (age 38) Heemstede, Netherlands
- Height: 1.99 m (6 ft 6 in)
- Weight: 94 kg (207 lb; 14.8 st)

Career
- Sport: Golf
- College: University of Colorado Boulder
- Turned professional: 2012
- Former tours: European Tour; Challenge Tour; Pro Golf Tour
- Professional wins: 5

Number of wins by tour
- Challenge Tour: 1
- Other: 4

Sebastian Heisele (born 8 August 1988) is a German professional golfer who plays on the European Tour. He won the 2019 Open de Bretagne on the Challenge Tour.

== Amateur career ==
Heisele was born in the Netherlands and grew up in Dubai, playing golf from the age of 12. He attended the University of Colorado Boulder from 2007 to 2011, graduating with a bachelor's degree in architecture. In 2011, while still an amateur, he won the Schloss Moyland Golfresort Classic on the Pro Golf Tour, beating Christoph Günther in a playoff.

== Professional career ==
Heisele turned professional in 2012 and played on the Pro Golf Tour. He had a successful 2014 season, winning two events on the tour and finishing second in the Order of Merit to gain a place on the Challenge Tour for 2015. After a disappointing 2015, he had a better season in 2016, with two fourth-place finishes and ending the season 28th in the Challenge Tour Order of Merit. At the end of 2016 he finished tied for 19th place in the European Tour Q-school to gain a place on the tour for 2017.

Heisele had limited success in 2017, finishing tied for third place in the KLM Open, ending the season 141st in the Order of Merit. He was also runner-up behind Oliver Farr in the Foshan Open on the Challenge Tour. At the end of the year he again did well in the European Tour Q-school, finishing tied for 18th place. Although he had a top-10 finish in the Commercial Bank Qatar Masters in early 2018, that was his only top-10 finish on the main tour and he returned to the Challenge Tour for 2019.

Heisele had a good start to 2019, winning the Open Tazegzout on the Pro Golf Tour in April. In September he had his first Challenge Tour win in the Open de Bretagne, finishing two strokes ahead of New Zealander Josh Geary. He finished the 2019 season in 4th place in the Challenge Tour Order of Merit to gain a place on the 2020 European Tour.

In October 2022, Heisele confirmed in a post-round interview at the Portugal Masters that it would be his final event on tour and planned to concentrate on coaching going forward.

== Professional wins (5) ==
=== Challenge Tour wins (1) ===
| No. | Date | Tournament | Winning score | Margin of victory | Runner-up |
|---|---|---|---|---|---|
| 1 | 8 Sep 2019 | Open de Bretagne | −13 (73-64-65-65=267) | 2 strokes | (New Zealand) Josh Geary |

=== Pro Golf Tour wins (4) ===
| No. | Date | Tournament | Winning score | Margin of victory | Runner(s)-up |
|---|---|---|---|---|---|
| 1 | 25 May 2011 | Schloss Moyland Golfresort Classic (as an amateur) | −2 (72-71-68=211) | Playoff | (Germany) Christoph Günther |
| 2 | 21 Apr 2014 | Open Dar es Salaam | −7 (68-71=139) (Note: Shortened to 36 holes due to weather.) | 2 strokes | (Germany) Moritz Lampert |
| 3 | 27 Aug 2014 | Gut Bissenmoor Classic | −14 (68-64-67=199) | 4 strokes | (Netherlands) Reinier Saxton, (Germany) Marcel Schneider |
| 4 | 4 Apr 2019 | Open Tazegzout | −8 (71-70-67=208) | 2 strokes | (France) Antoine Rozner |

== See also ==
- 2016 European Tour Qualifying School graduates
- 2017 European Tour Qualifying School graduates
- 2019 Challenge Tour graduates
