= Nicolai von Dellingshausen =

German golfer (born 1993)

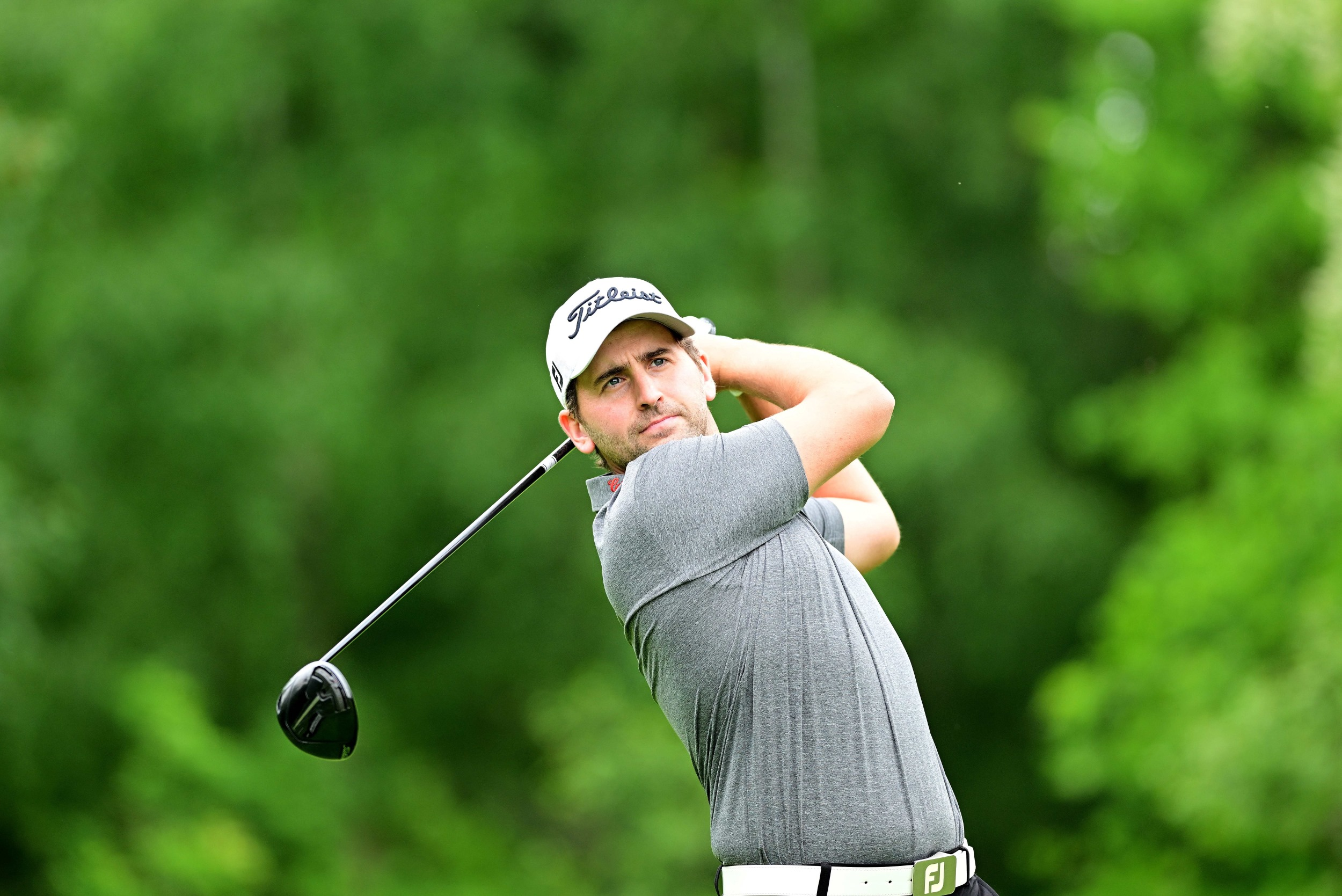

Personal information
- Nationality: Germany
- Born: 22 January 1993 (age 33)

Career
- Sport: Golf
- Turned professional: 2016
- Current tour: European Tour
- Former tours: Challenge Tour; Pro Golf Tour
- Professional wins: 4

Number of wins by tour
- European Tour: 1
- Other: 3

Achievements and awards
- Pro Golf Tour Order of Merit winner: 2017

Nicolai von Dellingshausen (born 22 January 1993) is a German professional golfer who currently plays on the European Tour.

== Professional career ==
Von Dellingshausen turned professional in late 2016 and played on the 2017 Pro Golf Tour. In February, he lost in a four-way playoff in the Tony Jacklin Open, before winning the Tazegzout Open in March. He had further wins in the Adamstal Open and the Sierra Polish Open, as well as two more runner-up finishes. His third win earned him immediate promotion to the Challenge Tour. In his third Challenge Tour event, he was runner-up in the 2017 Bridgestone Challenge, where Oscar Lengdén took victory with a birdie-birdie-eagle finish. He won the 2017 Pro Golf Tour Order of Merit.

Von Dellinghausen finished 21st in the 2024 Challenge Tour rankings. Despite being outside the top 20 in the rankings, two players were high enough in the Race to Dubai that status was extended to von Dellinghausen. In June 2025, von Dellinghausen claimed his first victory on the European Tour at the Austrian Alpine Open.

== Amateur wins ==
- 2011 Belgian International Youths
- 2013 German Match Play
- 2016 German Match Play, European Men's Club Trophy

== Professional wins (4) ==
=== European Tour wins (1) ===
| No. | Date | Tournament | Winning score | Margin of victory | Runners-up |
|---|---|---|---|---|---|
| 1 | 1 Jun 2025 | Austrian Alpine Open | −19 (65-66-65-65=261) | 2 strokes | (Norway) Kristoffer Reitan, (Germany) Marcel Schneider |

=== Pro Golf Tour wins (3) ===
| No. | Date | Tournament | Winning score | Margin of victory | Runner-up |
|---|---|---|---|---|---|
| 1 | 30 Mar 2017 | Open Tazegzout | −10 (64-73-69=206) | 2 strokes | (Netherlands) Dylan Boshart |
| 2 | 30 May 2017 | Adamstal Open | −5 (63-72-70=205) | Playoff | (France) Stanislas Gautier |
| 3 | 31 Jul 2017 | Sierra Polish Open | −15 (71-67-63=201) | 1 stroke | (Scotland) Chris Robb |

== Team appearances ==
Amateur

- European Amateur Team Championship (representing Germany): 2015

== See also ==
- 2023 European Tour Qualifying School graduates
- 2024 Challenge Tour graduates
