= Bernd Ritthammer =

German professional golfer

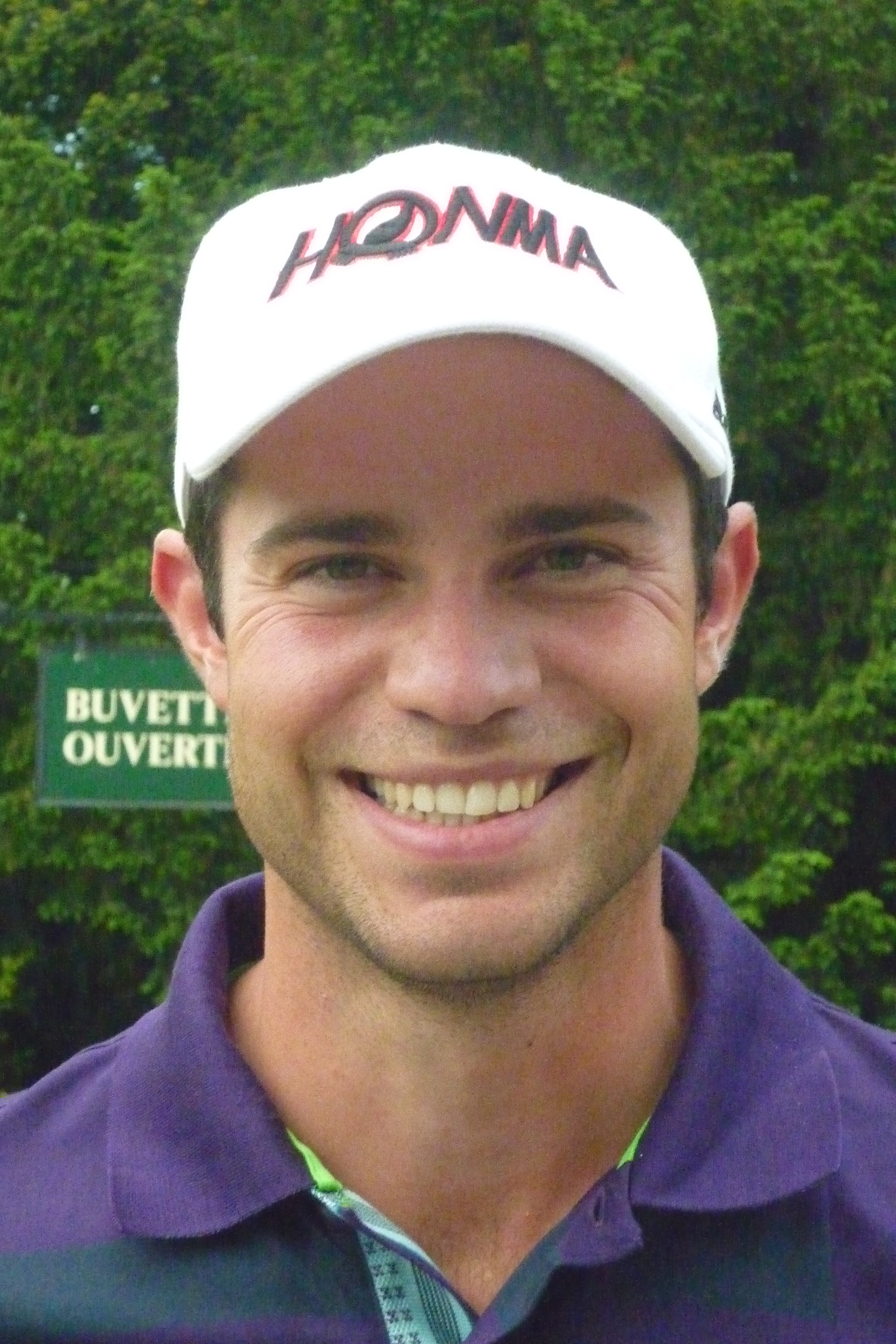

Personal information
- Nationality: Germany
- Born: 18 April 1987 (age 39) Munich, Germany
- Height: 1.82 m (6 ft 0 in)
- Weight: 78 kg (172 lb; 12.3 st)

Career
- Sport: Golf
- Turned professional: 2006
- Current tours: European Tour; Challenge Tour
- Former tour: Pro Golf Tour
- Professional wins: 8

Number of wins by tour
- Challenge Tour: 3
- Other: 5

Achievements and awards
- EPD Tour Order of Merit winner: 2009

Bernd Ritthammer (born 18 April 1987) is a German professional golfer.

Ritthammer turned professional in 2006 and played on the EPD Tour (now Pro Golf Tour) beginning in 2007. He won two EPD Tour events in 2009 and topped the Order of Merit, earning him his Challenge Tour card for 2010. He played on the Challenge Tour in 2010 and 2011 and earned his European Tour card for 2012 through qualifying school. In 2012, he played on both the European Tour and Challenge Tour, then dropped back to the Challenge Tour in 2013. He also picked up two more wins on the EPD Tour in 2013. He played on the Challenge Tour in 2014 and both Challenge and European Tours in 2015. In July 2016, he won his first Challenge Tour title at the Made in Denmark Challenge.

== Amateur wins ==
- 2002 German Under-16 Championship

== Professional wins (8) ==
=== Challenge Tour wins (3) ===
Legend
Grand Finals (1)
Other Challenge Tour (2)

No.	Date	Tournament	Winning score	Margin of victory	Runner(s)-up
1	3 Jul 2016	Made in Denmark Challenge	−12 (67-68-70-67=272)	1 stroke	(Netherlands) Jurrian van der Vaart
2	11 Sep 2016	Volopa Irish Challenge	−10 (72-70-66-70=278)	5 strokes	(England) Marcus Armitage, (England) Sam Walker
3	5 Nov 2016	NBO Golf Classic Grand Final	−21 (67-64-67-69=267)	1 stroke	(Sweden) Jens Dantorp

=== Pro Golf Tour wins (4) ===
No.	Date	Tournament	Winning score	Margin of victory	Runner-up
1	24 May 2009	Drei Thermen Golfresort Baden Württemberg Open	−10 (69-71-66=206)	2 strokes	(Germany) Sebastian Schwind (a)
2	8 Sep 2009	Preis des Hardenberg GolfResort	−8 (69-69-67=205)	Playoff	(Germany) Marcel Haremza
3	28 Feb 2013	Open Amelkis	−20 (64-67-65=196)	8 strokes	(Germany) Alexander Knappe
4	24 May 2013	Haugschlag NÖ Open	−9 (69-72-66=207)	2 strokes	(Germany) Florian Fritsch

=== Toro Tour wins (1) ===
No.	Date	Tournament	Winning score	Margin of victory	Runner-up
1	14 Jan 2022	Valle Ramano 2	+6 (70-77-72=219)	Playoff	(Germany) Finn Fleer

== Team appearances ==
Amateur

- European Boys' Team Championship (representing Germany): 2004

== See also ==
- List of golfers to achieve a three-win promotion from the Challenge Tour
- 2011 European Tour Qualifying School graduates
- 2016 Challenge Tour graduates
- 2018 European Tour Qualifying School graduates
