= Ondřej Lieser =

Czech professional golfer

Personal information
- Nationality: Czech Republic
- Born: 12 August 1991 (age 35) Prague, Czechoslovakia
- Height: 193 cm (6 ft 4 in)

Career
- Sport: Golf
- Turned professional: 2012
- Current tour: European Tour
- Former tours: Challenge Tour; Pro Golf Tour
- Professional wins: 15

Number of wins by tour
- Challenge Tour: 2
- Other: 13

Achievements and awards
- Challenge Tour Rankings winner: 2020

Ondřej Lieser (born 12 August 1991) is a Czech professional golfer who plays on the European Tour.

In 2020 he became the first golfer from the Czech Republic to win on the Challenge Tour with victory at the Andalucía Challenge de España, and the first Czech golfer to gain a full playing card on the European Tour.

He represented the Czech Republic at the 2020 Summer Olympics tournament but finished at the last place.

== Amateur career ==
Lieser represented the Czech Republic at the 2012 Eisenhower Trophy.

== Professional career ==
Lieser turned professional after the 2012 Eisenhower Trophy and made his professional debut at the D+D Real Czech Challenge on the Challenge Tour in October 2012, where he earned his first pay check after finishing tied 33rd.

Lieser played on the Pro Golf Tour where he won the Zell am See – Kaprun Open in 2018 and the Polish Open in 2019. He finished fifth on the 2019 Pro Golf Tour Order of Merit and earned a Challenge Tour card for 2020.

In 2020, Lieser finished tied for fourth place at the Italian Challenge Open Eneos Motor Oil in October before winning the Andalucía Challenge de España in Cadiz in November, two strokes ahead of Richard Mansell. With the victory, Lieser moved into sixth place on the Order of Merit and secured his spot in the season-ending Challenge Tour Grand Final. Lieser went on to win the Grand Final and by doing so; claimed the Order of Merit title, becoming the first Czech player to do so.

== Professional wins (15) ==
=== Challenge Tour wins (2) ===
Legend
Grand Finals (1)
Other Challenge Tour (1)

No.	Date	Tournament	Winning score	Margin of victory	Runner(s)-up
1	8 Nov 2020	Andalucía Challenge de España	−10 (74-70-67-67=278)	2 strokes	(England) Richard Mansell
2	22 Nov 2020	Challenge Tour Grand Final	−11 (70-69-66-68=273)	1 stroke	(Sweden) Christofer Blomstrand, (Germany) Alexander Knappe, (Spain) Santiago Tarrío

=== Pro Golf Tour wins (2) ===
No.	Date	Tournament	Winning score	Margin of victory	Runner-up
1	20 Jul 2018	Zell am See – Kaprun Open	−17 (66-64-69=199)	Playoff	(Scotland) Craig Howie
2	27 Jun 2019	Polish Open	−19 (61-66-64=191)	7 strokes	(France) Félix Mory

=== Czech PGA Tour wins (10) ===
No.	Date	Tournament	Winning score	Margin of victory	Runner-up
1	5 Oct 2013	Kaskáda Grand Final	+1 (73-74-70=217)	7 strokes	(Czech Republic) Stanislav Matuš
2	25 Aug 2015	Oaza Energo Czech PGA Stroke Play Championship	−11 (69-71-65=205)	9 strokes	(Czech Republic) Martin Příhoda
3	4 Sep 2016	WGM Czech Open	−6 (72-70-69-71=282)	Playoff	(England) Luke Groves
4	21 Oct 2016	Prague Golf Masters	−14 (68-63-71=202)	9 strokes	(Scotland) Chris Robb
5	26 Apr 2017	Czech One Trophy	−10 (65-67-74=206)	2 strokes	(Austria) Manuel Trappel
6	12 Aug 2017	Kenox Cup	−8 (68-68=136)	2 strokes	(Czech Republic) Filip Mrůzek
7	16 Aug 2017	Sokolov Trophy	−9 (65-70=135)	4 strokes	(Czech Republic) Aleš Kořínek, (Czech Republic) Filip Mrůzek
8	30 Sep 2018	Repromeda Cup	−18 (68-63-67=198)	6 strokes	(Czech Republic) Filip Mrůzek
9	9 Jun 2019	Czech PGA Matchplay Championship	5 and 4		(United States) Gregg LaVoie
10	6 Oct 2019	Portiva Golf Trophy	−11 (68-67-70=205)	1 stroke	(Czech Republic) Stanislav Matuš

=== Other wins (1) ===
No.	Date	Tournament	Winning score	Margin of victory	Runners-up
1	15 Sep 2020	Penati Slovak Open	−8 (71-67=138)	4 strokes	(Czech Republic) Štěpán Daněk, (Slovakia) Pavol Mach (a), (Czech Republic) Michal Pospíšil, (Czech Republic) Filip Raza

== Team appearances ==
Amateur

- Eisenhower Trophy (representing the Czech Republic): 2012
