= Wrocław Open (golf) =

Tournament information
- Location: Wrocław, Poland
- Established: 2008
- Course: Gradi Golf Club
- Par: 70
- Tours: Challenge Tour; Pro Golf Tour
- Format: Stroke play
- Prize fund: €30,000
- Month played: April
- Final year: 2017

Tournament record score
- Aggregate: 262 Gary Clark (2008)
- To par: −18 as above

Final champion
- (Germany) Finn Fleer
- Location in Poland

The Wrocław Open was a golf tournament on the Challenge Tour, played in Poland. It was held in 2008 and 2009, at the Toya Golf & Country Club in Wrocław.

== Winners ==
Year	Tour (Note: CHA − Challenge Tour; EPD/PGT − EPD Tour/Pro Golf Tour.)	Winner	Score	To par	Margin of victory	Runner(s)-up
Wrocław Open
2017	PGT	(Germany) Finn Fleer	197	−13	Playoff	(Poland) Adrian Meronk
2013–2016: No tournament
Deutsche Bank Wrocław Open
2012	EPD	(Germany) Stephan Wolters	207	−9	Playoff	(Czech Republic) Marek Nový
2010–11: No tournament
DHL Wrocław Open
2009	CHA	(Scotland) Eric Ramsay	263	−17	2 strokes	(England) Andrew Butterfield (England) Richard McEvoy
2008	CHA	(England) Gary Clark	262	−18	2 strokes	(England) Gary Boyd
