= Lars van der Vight =

Dutch professional golfer (born 2002)

Personal information
- Nationality: Netherlands
- Born: 31 October 2002 (age 24) Eindhoven, Netherlands

Career
- Sport: Golf
- College: University of Texas Rio Grande Valley
- Turned professional: 2024
- Current tour: European Tour
- Former tours: Challenge Tour; Pro Golf Tour
- Professional wins: 4

Number of wins by tour
- Challenge Tour: 2
- Other: 2

Achievements and awards
- Pro Golf Tour Order of Merit winner: 2025

Lars van der Vight (born 31 August 2002) is a Dutch professional golfer. He won the 2026 German Challenge after shooting a round of 59.

== Amateur career ==
Van der Vight had a successful amateur career. He won the 2021 Dutch Amateur, his first of five national titles. In 2022 he secured a triple, triumphing at the Dutch National U21 Stroke Play, Dutch National Stroke Play, and the Dutch Amateur.He made the cut at the 2023 KLM Open.

Van der Vight enjoyed his biggest international success in 2024, winning the Spanish International Amateur Championship three strokes ahead of Spain's Luis Masaveu.

Playing for his national team, he helped secure a runner-up finish at the 2024 European Amateur Team Championship, where he beat Algot Kleen in the final 3&2 as the Netherlands lost to Sweden 2–3.

Van der Vight enrolled at the University of Texas Rio Grande Valley in 2021.

== Professional career ==
Van der Vight turned professional in 2024 and joined the 2025 Pro Golf Tour, where he won twice and topped the rankings to graduate to the Challenge Tour.

In 2026, he shot a 59 on his way to win the German Challenge at Wittelsbacher Golfclub for his maiden Challenge Tour title.

== Amateur wins ==
- 2021 Dutch Amateur Championship
- 2022 Edge Golf Championships #4, Dutch National U21 Stroke Play Championship, Dutch National Stroke Play Championship, Dutch Amateur Championship
- 2023 Dutch National Open Championship
- 2024 Spanish International Amateur Championship

== Professional wins (4) ==
=== Challenge Tour wins (2) ===
No.	Date	Tournament	Winning score	Margin of victory	Runner-up
1	12 Jul 2026	German Challenge	−17 (70-59-72-70=271)	1 stroke	(France) Julien Sale
2	11 Oct 2026	Hainan Open^{1}	−23 (68-67-62-68=265)	2 strokes	(Spain) Joseba Torres

^{1}Co-sanctioned by the China Tour

=== Pro Golf Tour wins (2) ===
No.	Date	Tournament	Winning score	Margin of victory	Runner(s)-up
1	27 Mar 2025	Zala Springs Open	−20 (65-64-67=196)	Playoff	(Netherlands) Mike Toorop
2	28 Aug 2025	Stippelberg Open	−19 (65-67-65=197)	2 strokes	(France) Clément Guichard, (Germany) Linus Lang

== Team appearances ==
Amateur

- European Amateur Team Championship (representing the Netherlands): 2022, 2023, 2024
- Eisenhower Trophy (representing the Netherlands): 2022, 2023
- European Nations Cup – Copa Sotogrande (representing the Netherlands): 2023, 2024
- St Andrews Trophy (representing the Continent of Europe): 2024 (winners)

== See also ==
- 2026 Challenge Tour graduates
- Lowest rounds of golf
