= 2025 Pro Golf Tour =

Golf tour season

2025 Pro Golf Tour season
- Duration: 22 February 2025 – 6 October 2025
- Number of official events: 17
- Most wins: (France) Clément Guichard (2) (Germany) Michael Hirmer (2) (Czech Republic) Filip Mrůzek (2) (Netherlands) Lars van der Vight (2)
- Order of Merit: (Netherlands) Lars van der Vight

The 2025 Pro Golf Tour was the 29th season of the Pro Golf Tour (formerly the EPD Tour), a third-tier tour recognised by the European Tour.

== Schedule ==
The following table lists official events during the 2025 season.

Date	Tournament	Host country	Purse (€)	Winner (Note: The number in brackets after each winner's name is the number of Pro Golf Tour events they had won up to and including that tournament. It is rare for someone to accumulate many wins on the Pro Golf Tour as success at this level usually leads to promotion to the Challenge Tour.)	OWGR points
25 Feb	Golf Mad Open	Turkey	30,000	(Germany) Michael Hirmer (5)	1.12
28 Feb	Lykia Links Open	Turkey	30,000	(Germany) Carl Siemens (1)	1.12
13 Mar	Red Sea Ain Sokhna Open	Egypt	30,000	(Germany) Martin Obtmeier (1)	1.09
18 Mar	Red Sea Egyptian Classic	Egypt	30,000	(Czech Republic) Filip Mrůzek (1)	1.10
27 Mar	Zala Springs Open	Hungary	30,000	(Netherlands) Lars van der Vight (1)	0.91
10 Apr	Little Venice Red Sea Open	Egypt	30,000	(Belgium) Nathan Cossement (1)	1.03
15 Apr	Ain Bay Red Sea Open	Egypt	30,000	(France) Clément Guichard (1)	1.21
1 May	Haugschlag NÖ Open	Austria	30,000	(Germany) Nicolas Horder (1)	1.34
8 May	Raiffeisen Pro Golf Tour St. Pölten	Austria	30,000	(Czech Republic) Filip Mrůzek (2)	1.20
4 Jul	Gradi Polish Open	Poland	30,000	(Germany) Dennis Fuchs (1)	0.98
24 Jul	Cuber Open	Germany	30,000	(Switzerland) Mauro Gilardi (1)	1.27
30 Jul	Bonmont Pro Golf Tour	Switzerland	30,000	(Germany) Michael Hirmer (6)	1.12
16 Aug	Staan Open	Netherlands	30,000	(France) Clément Guichard (2)	0.98
22 Aug	Mono Gelpenberg Open	Netherlands	30,000	(Germany) Timo Vahlenkamp (4)	1.06
28 Aug	Stippelberg Open	Netherlands	30,000	(Netherlands) Lars van der Vight (2)	1.15
11 Sep	Iron Duke Belgian Open	Belgium	30,000	(Germany) Linus Lang (1)	0.90
6 Oct	Castanea Resort Championship	Germany	50,000	(Germany) Christian Bräunig (3)	0.74

== Order of Merit ==
The Order of Merit was based on tournament results during the season, calculated using a points-based system. The top five players on the Order of Merit earned status to play on the 2026 Challenge Tour (HotelPlanner Tour).

Position	Player	Points	Status earned
1	(Netherlands) Lars van der Vight	25,158	Promoted to Challenge Tour
2	(France) Clément Guichard	23,026	Promoted to Challenge Tour
3	(Germany) Christian Bräunig	18,631	Promoted to Challenge Tour
4	(Germany) Michael Hirmer	18,123	Promoted to Challenge Tour
5	(Germany) Linus Lang	16,120	Promoted to Challenge Tour
6	(Czech Republic) Filip Mrůzek	15,542	
7	(Netherlands) Mike Toorop	15,005	Qualified for European Tour (Top 20 in Q School)
8	(Germany) Timo Vahlenkamp	14,559	
9	(Germany) Nicolas Horder	13,980	
10	(Germany) Carl Siemens	13,165	
