= 2017 Pro Golf Tour =

Golf tour season

2017 Pro Golf Tour season
- Duration: 16 January 2017 – 26 September 2017
- Number of official events: 21
- Most wins: (Germany) Nicolai von Dellingshausen (3) (Germany) Max Schmitt (3)
- Order of Merit: (Germany) Nicolai von Dellingshausen

The 2017 Pro Golf Tour is the 21st season of the Pro Golf Tour (formerly the EPD Tour), a third-tier tour recognised by the European Tour.

== Schedule ==
The following table lists official events during the 2017 season.

Date	Tournament	Host country	Purse (€)	Winner (Note: The number in brackets after each winner's name is the number of Pro Golf Tour events they had won up to and including that tournament. It is rare for someone to accumulate many wins on the Pro Golf Tour as success at this level usually leads to promotion to the Challenge Tour.)	OWGR points
18 Jan	Red Sea Egyptian Classic	Egypt	30,000	(France) Kenny Subregis (1)	4
24 Jan	Red Sea Ain Sokhna Classic	Egypt	30,000	(England) Ben Parker (5)	4
10 Feb	Tony Jacklin Open	Morocco	30,000	(Netherlands) Robbie van West (1)	4
16 Feb	Open Casa Green Golf	Morocco	30,000	(Germany) Christopher Carstensen (1)	4
3 Mar	Open Madaef	Morocco	30,000	(Switzerland) Marco Iten (1)	4
9 Mar	Open Royal Golf Anfa Mohammedia	Morocco	30,000	(Germany) Max Schmitt (a) (1)	4
24 Mar	Open Ocean	Morocco	30,000	(Netherlands) Dylan Boshart (1)	4
30 Mar	Open Tazegzout	Morocco	30,000	(Germany) Nicolai von Dellingshausen (1)	4
27 Apr	Haugschlag NÖ Open	Austria	30,000	(Netherlands) Michael Kraaij (1)	0 (Note: Points reduced from 4 to 0 due to tournament being shortened to 18 holes because of weather.)
3 May	EXTEC Pro Golf Tour	Czech Republic	30,000	(England) Ben Parker (6)	4
24 May	Raiffeisen Pro Golf Tour St. Pölten	Austria	30,000	(Czech Republic) Stanislav Matuš (2)	4
30 May	Adamstal Open	Austria	30,000	(Germany) Nicolai von Dellingshausen (2)	4
13 Jun	Austerlitz Classic	Czech Republic	30,000	(Germany) Maximilian Walz (1)	4
7 Jul	Sparkassen Open	Germany	30,000	(Germany) Hinrich Arkenau (3)	4
18 Jul	Zell am See – Kaprun Open	Austria	30,000	(Germany) Alexander Herrmann (a) (1)	4
24 Jul	Preis des Hardenberg GolfResort	Germany	30,000	(Germany) Sean Einhaus (2)	0
31 Jul	Sierra Polish Open	Poland	30,000	(Germany) Nicolai von Dellingshausen (3)	4
11 Aug	Gut Bissenmoor Classic	Germany	30,000	(Switzerland) Marco Iten (2)	4
17 Aug	Starnberg Open	Germany	30,000	(Germany) Max Schmitt (a) (2)	4
4 Sep	Wrocław Open	Poland	30,000	(Germany) Finn Fleer (1)	4
26 Sep	Castanea Resort Championship	Germany	50,000	(Germany) Max Schmitt (a) (3)	4

== Order of Merit ==
The Order of Merit was based on tournament results during the season, calculated using a points-based system. The top five players on the Order of Merit (not otherwise exempt) earned status to play on the 2018 Challenge Tour.

Position	Player	Points	Status earned
1	(Germany) Nicolai von Dellingshausen	29,651	Finished in Top 70 of Challenge Tour Rankings
2	(Germany) Max Schmitt (a)	24,794	Promoted to Challenge Tour
3	(England) Ben Parker	24,410	Promoted to Challenge Tour
4	(Portugal) Pedro Figueiredo	23,160	Promoted to Challenge Tour
5	(Switzerland) Marco Iten	23,153	Qualified for Challenge Tour (made cut in Q School)
6	(Czech Republic) Stanislav Matuš	22,058	Promoted to Challenge Tour
7	(Netherlands) Robbie van West	17,112	Promoted to Challenge Tour
8	(Germany) Finn Fleer	15,923	
9	(Germany) Maximilian Laier	15,661	
10	(Netherlands) Dylan Boshart	15,270	
