= Open de Bretagne =

Golf tournament

Blot Play9
Tournament information
- Location: Pléneuf-Val-André, France
- Established: 2004
- Course: Golf Blue Green de Pléneuf Val André
- Par: 70
- Length: 6,488 yards (5,933 m)
- Tours: Challenge Tour; Alps Tour
- Format: Stroke play
- Prize fund: €300,000
- Month played: June

Tournament record score
- Aggregate: 262 Per Längfors (2024); 262 John Parry (2024)
- To par: −18 as above

Current champion
- (England) John Gough

Final champion
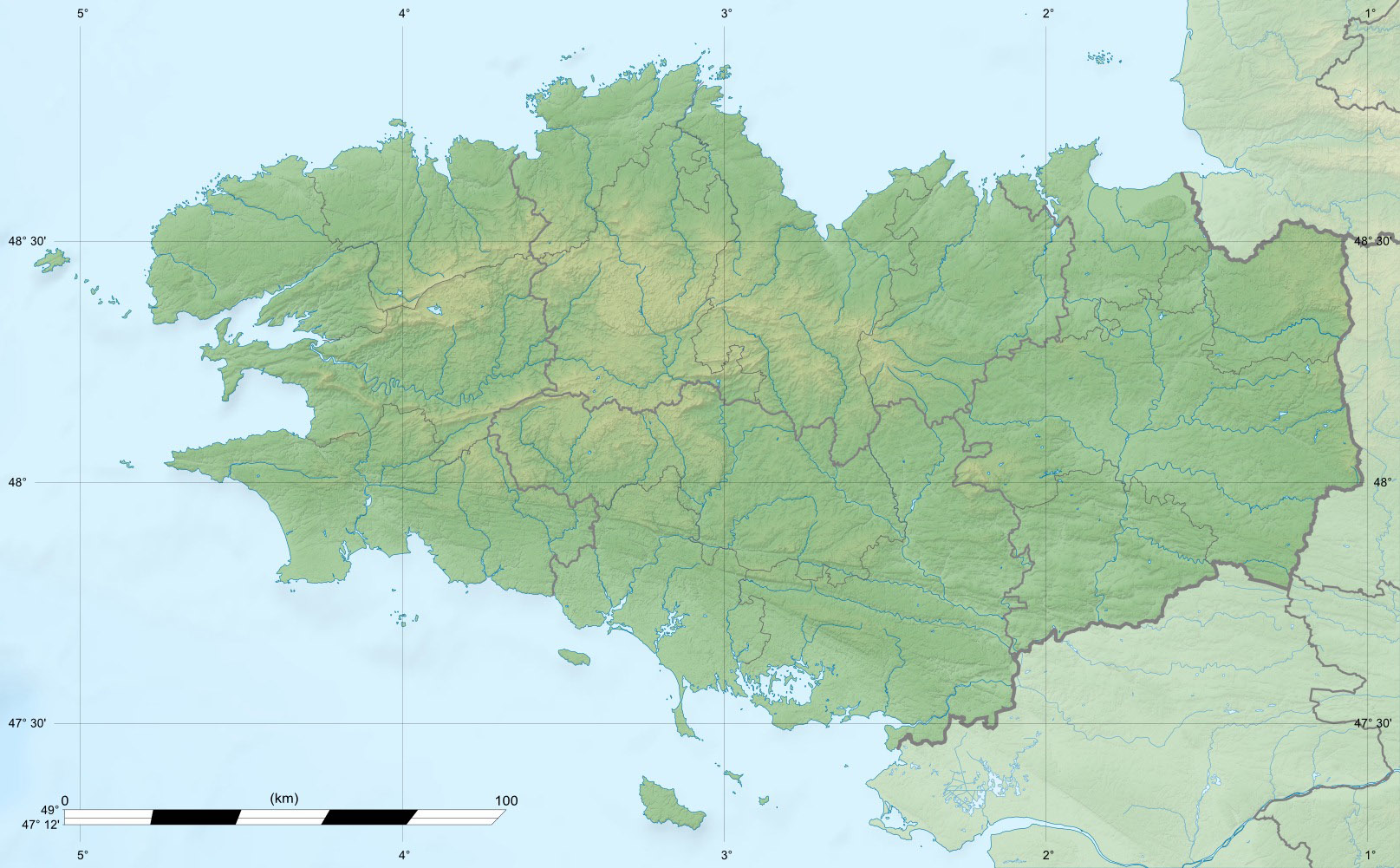
- Location in France Location in Brittany

The Open de Bretagne is an annual golf tournament held in Brittany, France. It was founded in 2004.

Having been a stop on the Alps Tour for its first three years, in 2007 it became part of the second tier Challenge Tour schedule. It also forms part of the domestic French Tour.

== Winners ==
Year	Tour (Note: ALP − Alps Tour; CHA − Challenge Tour.)	Winner	Score	To par	Margin of victory	Runner(s)-up
Blot Play9
2026	CHA	(England) John Gough	266	−14	2 strokes	(Denmark) Frederik Kjettrup
2025	CHA	(England) James Morrison	274	−6	Playoff	(Republic of Ireland) Max Kennedy
Blot Open de Bretagne
2024	CHA	(England) John Parry	262	−18	Playoff	(Sweden) Per Längfors
2023	CHA	(Wales) Stuart Manley	271	−9	2 strokes	(Spain) Manuel Elvira (England) Lee Slattery
2022	CHA	(England) Alfie Plant	269	−11	1 stroke	(Republic of Ireland) Ruaidhri McGee
Open de Bretagne
2021	CHA	(France) Julien Brun	267	−13	2 strokes	(United States) Chase Hanna (France) Jérôme Lando-Casanova
2020	CHA	Cancelled due to the COVID-19 pandemic				
2019	CHA	(Germany) Sebastian Heisele	267	−13	2 strokes	(New Zealand) Josh Geary
Cordon Golf Open
2018	CHA	(England) Jack Singh Brar	265	−15	3 strokes	(Spain) Adri Arnaus
2017	CHA	(Iceland) Birgir Hafþórsson	192 (Note: Shortened to 54 holes due to rain.)	−18	7 strokes	(England) Matt Ford (Italy) Andrea Pavan
2016	CHA	(Spain) Álvaro Velasco	268	−12	1 stroke	(Germany) Alexander Knappe (Sweden) Oscar Stark
2015	CHA	(Australia) Scott Arnold	271	−9	2 strokes	(Netherlands) Daan Huizing (England) James Robinson
Open Blue Green Côtes d'Armor Bretagne
2014	CHA	(France) Benjamin Hébert	265	−15	3 strokes	(Scotland) Andrew McArthur
2013	CHA	(Italy) Andrea Pavan	269	−11	4 strokes	(Wales) Rhys Davies (England) Robert Dinwiddie
Allianz Open Côtes d'Armor Bretagne
2012	CHA	(England) Eddie Pepperell	277	−3	Playoff	(Denmark) Jeppe Huldahl
2011	CHA	(England) Phillip Archer	273	−7	1 stroke	(Austria) Roland Steiner
2010	CHA	(England) Sam Walker	272	−8	1 stroke	(France) Victor Riu (Scotland) Raymond Russell
2009	CHA	(England) Lee S. James	274	−6	Playoff	(Germany) Florian Fritsch
AGF-Allianz Open Côtes d'Armor Bretagne
2008	CHA	(Sweden) Joakim Haeggman	275	−5	1 stroke	(England) Marcus Higley
Open AGF-Allianz Côtes d’Armor Bretagne
2007	CHA	(England) Peter Baker	267	−13	Playoff	(England) Ross McGowan
Open Aquarelle.com Côtes d'Armor Bretagne
2006	ALP	(France) Julien Xanthopoulos	275	−13	3 strokes	(France) Mike Lorenzo-Vera
Open International Côtes d'Armor Bretagne
2005	ALP	(France) Nicolas Joakimides	278	−10	3 strokes	(France) Bertrand Coathalem
2004	ALP	(France) Julien Millet (a)	272	−16	5 strokes	(Italy) Andrea Maestroni
