= 2002 EPD Tour =

Golf tour season

2002 EPD Tour season
- Duration: 27 February 2002 – 26 September 2002
- Number of official events: 14
- Most wins: (Germany) Marcel Haremza (2) (Netherlands) Stéphane Lovey (2) (Germany) Richard Porter (2)
- Order of Merit: (Germany) Richard Porter

The 2002 EPD Tour was the sixth season of the EPD Tour, a third-tier tour recognised by the European Tour.

== Schedule ==
The following table lists official events during the 2002 season.

Date	Tournament	Host country	Purse (€)	Winner (Note: The number in brackets after each winner's name is the number of EPD Tour events they had won up to and including that tournament. It is rare for someone to accumulate many wins on the EPD Tour as success at this level usually leads to promotion to the Challenge Tour.)
28 Feb	Torremirona Classic	Spain	15,000	(Netherlands) Joost Steenkamer (1)
17 Apr	Jakobsberg Classic	Germany	15,000	(France) Anthony Grenier (1)
23 Apr	Bad Windsheim Classic	Germany	17,500	(Scotland) Euan McIntosh (1)
7 May	Langenstein Classic	Germany	17,500	(Germany) Richard Porter (1)
28 May	La Largue Classic	France	17,500	(Germany) Marcel Haremza (1)
3 Jun	Dillenburg Classic	Germany	17,500	(Saint Lucia) Regis Gustave (2)
24 Jun	Schärding Classic	Austria	17,500	(Germany) Richard Porter (2)
9 Jul	Winnerod Classic	Germany	17,500	(Netherlands) Stéphane Lovey (1)
23 Jul	Sybrook Classic	Netherlands	17,500	(Germany) Marcel Haremza (2)
30 Jul	Kassel Classic	Germany	17,500	(England) Nick Taylor (1)
13 Aug	Königsfeld Classic	Germany	17,500	(Netherlands) Stéphane Lovey (2)
20 Aug	Lich Classic	Germany	17,500	(Belgium) Jack Boeckx (1)
11 Sep	Spessart Classic	Germany	17,500	(Belgium) Arnaud Langenaeken (1)
26 Sep	EPD Tour Championship	Germany	17,500	(England) Darren Leng (1)

== Order of Merit ==
The Order of Merit was based on prize money won during the season, calculated in Euros. The top four players on the Order of Merit earned status to play on the 2003 Challenge Tour.

Position	Player	Prize money (€)	Status earned
1	(Germany) Richard Porter	15,104	Promoted to Challenge Tour
2	(Germany) Marcel Haremza	11,105	Promoted to Challenge Tour
3	(Belgium) Jack Boeckx	9,574	Promoted to Challenge Tour
4	(Scotland) Euan McIntosh	9,526	Promoted to Challenge Tour
5	(England) Darren Leng	9,261	
6	(Belgium) Arnaud Langenaeken	7,640	
7	(Netherlands) Stéphane Lovey	7,102	
8	(Netherlands) Joost Steenkamer	6,892	
9	(Germany) Arne Dickel	6,364	
10	(Saint Lucia) Regis Gustave	5,340	
