= 2015 Pro Golf Tour =

Golf tour season

2015 Pro Golf Tour season
- Duration: 12 January 2015 – 29 September 2015
- Number of official events: 22
- Most wins: (Germany) Martin Keskari (3) (Switzerland) Benjamin Rusch (3)
- Order of Merit: (Germany) Philipp Mejow

The 2015 Pro Golf Tour was the 19th season of the Pro Golf Tour (formerly the EPD Tour), a third-tier tour recognised by the European Tour.

== OWGR inclusion ==
In July, it was announced that all Pro Golf Tour events, beginning with the Lotos Polish Open, would receive Official World Golf Ranking points at the minimum level of 4 points for the winner of a 54-hole event.

== Schedule ==
The following table lists official events during the 2015 season.

Date	Tournament	Host country	Purse (€)	Winner (Note: The number in brackets after each winner's name is the number of Pro Golf Tour events they had won up to and including that tournament. It is rare for someone to accumulate many wins on the Pro Golf Tour as success at this level usually leads to promotion to the Challenge Tour.)	OWGR points
14 Jan	Red Sea Egyptian Classic	Egypt	30,000	(Netherlands) Reinier Saxton (4)	n/a
20 Jan	Red Sea Ain Sokhna Classic	Egypt	30,000	(Germany) Philipp Mejow (2)	n/a
2 Feb	Open Samanah	Morocco	30,000	(Germany) Martin Keskari (1)	n/a
6 Feb	Open Al Maaden	Morocco	30,000	(France) Alexandre Kaleka (1)	n/a
12 Feb	Open Mogador	Morocco	30,000	(France) Mathieu Decottignies-Lafon (1)	n/a
2 Mar	Open Dar Es Salam (Blue Course)	Morocco	30,000	(Germany) David Heinzinger (1)	n/a
6 Mar	Open Dar Es Salam (Red Course)	Morocco	30,000	(Switzerland) Benjamin Rusch (1)	n/a
15 Apr	Open Casa Green Golf	Morocco	30,000	(Germany) Nicolas Meitinger (10)	n/a
21 Apr	Open Royal Golf Anfa Mohammedia	Morocco	30,000	(England) Ben Parker (3)	n/a
27 Apr	Open Madaef	Morocco	30,000	(France) Mathieu Decottignies-Lafon (2)	n/a
28 May	Haugschlag NÖ Open	Austria	30,000	(Switzerland) Benjamin Rusch (2)	n/a
2 Jun	Adamstal Open	Austria	30,000	(France) Olivier Rozner (1)	n/a
7 Jun	St. Pölten Pro Golf Tour	Austria	30,000	(Netherlands) Reinier Saxton (5)	n/a
15 Jun	Ceevee Leather Open	Germany	30,000	(France) Antoine Schwartz (2)	n/a
11 Jul	Praforst Pro Golf Tour	Germany	30,000	(Germany) Martin Keskari (2)	n/a
17 Jul	Gut Bissenmoor Classic	Germany	30,000	(Germany) Philipp Mejow (3)	n/a
28 Jul	Lotos Polish Open	Poland	30,000	(Germany) Martin Keskari (3)	4
4 Aug	Kosaido Düsseldorf Open	Germany	30,000	(Germany) Maximilian Röhrig (1)	4
11 Aug	Sparkassen Open	Germany	30,000	(Netherlands) Robin Kind (2)	4
18 Aug	Augsburg Classic	Germany	30,000	(France) Romain Bechu (1)	4
31 Aug	Preis de Hardenborg GolfResorts	Germany	30,000	(Germany) Maximilian Laier (1)	4
29 Sep	Castanea Resort Pro Golf Tour Championship	Germany	50,000	(Switzerland) Benjamin Rusch (3)	4

== Order of Merit ==
The Order of Merit was based on tournament results during the season, calculated using a points-based system. The top five players on the Order of Merit (not otherwise exempt) earned status to play on the 2016 Challenge Tour.

Position	Player	Points	Status earned
1	(Germany) Philipp Mejow	35,311	Promoted to Challenge Tour
2	(Switzerland) Benjamin Rusch	32,537	Promoted to Challenge Tour
3	(Netherlands) Reinier Saxton	27,349	Qualified for Challenge Tour (made cut in Q School)
4	(Germany) Martin Keskari	27,024	Promoted to Challenge Tour
5	(Finland) Teemu Bakker	21,009	Promoted to Challenge Tour
6	(Netherlands) Robin Kind	19,671	Promoted to Challenge Tour
7	(France) David Antonelli	18,089	
8	(France) Mathieu Decottignies-Lafon	17,641	
9	(Germany) Maximilian Laier	17,377	
10	(Scotland) Chris Robb	16,904	
