= 2016 Pro Golf Tour =

Golf tour season

2016 Pro Golf Tour season
- Duration: 18 January 2016 – 27 September 2016
- Number of official events: 19
- Most wins: (Germany) Hinrich Arkenau (2) (France) Johann Lopez-Lazaro (2) (Belgium) Christopher Mivis (2) (Germany) Benedict Staben (2)
- Order of Merit: (France) Antoine Schwartz

The 2016 Pro Golf Tour was the 20th season of the Pro Golf Tour (formerly the EPD Tour), a third-tier tour recognised by the European Tour.

== Schedule ==
The following table lists official events during the 2016 season.

Date	Tournament	Host country	Purse (€)	Winner (Note: The number in brackets after each winner's name is the number of Pro Golf Tour events they had won up to and including that tournament. It is rare for someone to accumulate many wins on the Pro Golf Tour as success at this level usually leads to promotion to the Challenge Tour.)	OWGR points
20 Jan	Red Sea Egyptian Classic	Egypt	30,000	(France) Antoine Schwartz (3)	4
26 Jan	Red Sea Ain Sokhna Classic	Egypt	30,000	(Belgium) Christopher Mivis (3)	4
8 Feb	Open Ocean	Morocco	30,000	(Germany) Moritz Lampert (3)	4
12 Feb	Open Tazegzout	Morocco	30,000	(Germany) Martin Keskari (4)	4
7 Mar	Tony Jacklin Open	Morocco	30,000	(Republic of Ireland) Rory McNamara (1)	4
11 Mar	Open Casa Green	Morocco	30,000	(France) Johann Lopez-Lazaro (1)	4
11 Apr	Open Madaef	Morocco	30,000	(France) Stanislas Gautier (1)	4
15 Apr	Open Royal Golf Anfa Mohammedia	Morocco	30,000	(England) Ben Parker (4)	4
5 May	Ypsilon Cup	Czech Republic	30,000	(Germany) Benedict Staben (1)	4
19 May	Haugschlag NÖ Open	Austria	30,000	(Czech Republic) Stanislav Matuš (1)	4
24 May	Adamstal Open	Austria	30,000	(France) Johann Lopez-Lazaro (2)	4
29 May	St. Pölten Pro Golf Tour	Austria	30,000	(Belgium) Christopher Mivis (4)	4
13 Jun	Ceevee Leather Open	Germany	30,000	(Germany) Max Kramer (8)	4
8 Jul	Kosaido Düsseldorf Open	Germany	30,000	(Germany) Hinrich Arkenau (1)	4
15 Jul	Sparkassen Open	Germany	30,000	(Netherlands) Maarten Bosch (1)	4
26 Jul	Lotos Polish Open	Poland	30,000	(Germany) Hinrich Arkenau (2)	4
5 Aug	Gut Bissenmoor Classic	Germany	30,000	(France) Mathieu Fenasse (1)	4
22 Aug	Preis des Hardenberg GolfResort	Germany	30,000	(Germany) Benedict Staben (2)	4
27 Sep	Castanea Resort Pro Golf Tour Championship	Germany	50,000	(Germany) Niklas Adank (1)	4

== Order of Merit ==
The Order of Merit was based on tournament results during the season, calculated using a points-based system. The top five players on the Order of Merit earned status to play on the 2017 Challenge Tour.

Position	Player	Points	Status earned
1	(France) Antoine Schwartz	22,105	Promoted to Challenge Tour
2	(Germany) Julian Kunzenbacher	21,996	Promoted to Challenge Tour
3	(Belgium) Christopher Mivis	20,454	Promoted to Challenge Tour
4	(Germany) Max Kramer	18,603	Promoted to Challenge Tour
5	(France) Mathieu Fenasse	17,441	Promoted to Challenge Tour
6	(Germany) Patrick Kopp	16,482	
7	(France) Johann Lopez-Lazaro	16,177	
8	(Germany) Benedict Staben	15,849	
9	(Czech Republic) Stanislav Matuš	14,403	
10	(Republic of Ireland) Rory McNamara	12,944	
