= 2022 Pro Golf Tour =

Golf tour season

2022 Pro Golf Tour season
- Duration: 15 March 2022 – 28 September 2022
- Number of official events: 13
- Most wins: (France) Jean Bekirian (2)
- Order of Merit: (Germany) Michael Hirmer

The 2022 Pro Golf Tour was the 26th season of the Pro Golf Tour (formerly the EPD Tour), a third-tier tour recognised by the European Tour.

== Schedule ==
The following table lists official events during the 2022 season.

Date	Tournament	Host country	Purse (€)	Winner (Note: The number in brackets after each winner's name is the number of Pro Golf Tour events they had won up to and including that tournament. It is rare for someone to accumulate many wins on the Pro Golf Tour as success at this level usually leads to promotion to the Challenge Tour.)	OWGR points
17 Mar	Dreamlands Pyramids Classic	Egypt	30,000	(Belgium) Alan de Bondt (1)	4
22 Mar	NewGiza Pyramids Challenge	Egypt	30,000	(Germany) Maximilian Herrmann (1)	4
27 Mar	Allegria Open	Egypt	30,000	(France) Victor Veyret (2)	4
14 Apr	Red Sea Ain Sokhna Classic	Egypt	30,000	(Czech Republic) Jan Cafourek (2)	4
19 Apr	Red Sea Egyptian Classic	Egypt	30,000	(Belgium) Yente van Doren (1)	4
29 Apr	Haugschlag NÖ Open	Austria	30,000	(Netherlands) Dario Antonisse (1)	4
24 Jun	Gradi Polish Open	Poland	30,000	(Germany) Michael Hirmer (3)	4
30 Jun	Raiffeisen Pro Golf Tour St. Pölten	Austria	30,000	(France) Jean Bekirian (2)	4
12 Jul	Weihenstephan Open	Germany	30,000	(Germany) Marc Hammer (2)	4
10 Aug	Richter+Frenzel Open	Germany	30,000	(France) Alexandre Liu (1)	0.56
28 Aug	Altepro Trophy	Czech Republic	30,000	(France) Jean Bekirian (3)	0.57
3 Sep	FaberExposize Gelpenberg Open	Netherlands	30,000	(Netherlands) Floris de Haas (1)	0.59
28 Sep	Castanea Resort Championship	Germany	50,000	(Germany) Jannik de Bruyn (1)	0.41

== Order of Merit ==
The Order of Merit was based on tournament results during the season, calculated using a points-based system. The top five players on the Order of Merit earned status to play on the 2023 Challenge Tour.

Position	Player	Points	Status earned
1	(Germany) Michael Hirmer	17,785	Promoted to Challenge Tour
2	(France) Jean Bekirian	17,563	Promoted to Challenge Tour
3	(Belgium) Alan de Bondt	15,382	Promoted to Challenge Tour
4	(Germany) Jannik de Bruyn	14,095	Promoted to Challenge Tour
5	(Belgium) Yente van Doren	12,554	Promoted to Challenge Tour
6	(Germany) Philipp Katich	10,920	
7	(France) Victor Veyret	10,800	
8	(Germany) Marc Hammer	10,246	Finished in Top 70 of Challenge Tour Rankings
9	(Austria) Felix Schulz	10,144	
10	(Netherlands) Dario Antonisse	9,988	
