= 2013 Pro Golf Tour =

Golf tour season

2013 Pro Golf Tour season
- Duration: 22 January 2013 – 29 September 2013
- Number of official events: 22
- Most wins: (Germany) Florian Fritsch (4)
- Order of Merit: (Germany) Florian Fritsch

The 2013 Pro Golf Tour was the 17th season of the Pro Golf Tour (formerly the EPD Tour), a third-tier tour recognised by the European Tour.

== Schedule ==
The following table lists official events during the 2013 season.

Date	Tournament	Host country	Purse (€)	Winner (Note: The number in brackets after each winner's name is the number of Pro Golf Tour events they had won up to and including that tournament. It is rare for someone to accumulate many wins on the Pro Golf Tour as success at this level usually leads to promotion to the Challenge Tour.)
24 Jan	Siren Classic	Turkey	30,000	(Germany) Philipp Mejow (1)
29 Jan	Sueno Dunes Classic	Turkey	30,000	(Scotland) David Law (2)
2 Feb	Sueno Pines Classic	Turkey	30,000	(Switzerland) Ken Benz (1)
22 Feb	Open Mogador	Morocco	30,000	(Belgium) Christopher Mivis (1)
28 Feb	Open Amelkis	Morocco	30,000	(Germany) Bernd Ritthammer (3)
5 Mar	Open Al Maaden	Morocco	30,000	(Netherlands) Robin Kind (1)
21 Mar	Red Sea Egyptian Classic	Egypt	30,000	(Portugal) Tiago Cruz (2)
28 Mar	Red Sea Ain Sokhna Open	Egypt	30,000	(France) Antoine Schwartz (1)
11 Apr	Open Madaef	Morocco	30,000	(Netherlands) Richard Kind (2)
17 Apr	Open Dar Es Salam	Morocco	30,000	(Switzerland) Damian Ulrich (2)
23 Apr	Open Lixus	Morocco	30,000	(Belgium) Christopher Mivis (2)
9 May	GreenEagle Classic	Germany	30,000	(Germany) Florian Fritsch (3)
24 May	Haugschlag NÖ Open	Austria	30,000	(Germany) Bernd Ritthammer (4)
29 May	Adamstal Open	Austria	30,000	(Austria) Leo Astl (1)
7 Jun	Land Fleesensee Classic	Germany	30,000	(Germany) Florian Fritsch (4)
26 Jun	Glashofen-Neusaß Open	Germany	30,000	(Austria) Leo Astl (2)
14 Jul	Praforst Pro Golf Tour	Germany	30,000	(France) Kenny Le Sager (1)
24 Jul	Lotos Polish Open	Poland	30,000	(Germany) Florian Fritsch (5)
7 Aug	Castanea Resort Open	Germany	30,000	(Germany) Anton Kirstein (1)
14 Aug	Augsburg Classic	Germany	30,000	(Germany) Dennis Küpper (9)
3 Sep	Preis des Hardenberg GolfResort	Germany	30,000	(Germany) Florian Fritsch (6)
29 Sep	Deutsche Bank Polish Masters Pro Golf Tour Championship	Germany	40,000	(Germany) Maximilian Glauert (4)

== Order of Merit ==
The Order of Merit was based on tournament results during the season, calculated using a points-based system. The top five players on the Order of Merit (not otherwise exempt) earned status to play on the 2014 Challenge Tour.

Position	Player	Points	Status earned
1	(Germany) Florian Fritsch	29,278	Promoted to Challenge Tour
2	(Belgium) Christopher Mivis	23,989	Promoted to Challenge Tour
3	(Netherlands) Robin Kind	22,333	Promoted to Challenge Tour
4	(Germany) Bernd Ritthammer	21,596	Finished in Top 70 of Challenge Tour Rankings
5	(Scotland) David Law	18,378	Promoted to Challenge Tour
6	(Switzerland) Ken Benz	17,492	Promoted to Challenge Tour
7	(Netherlands) Richard Kind	16,464	
8	(Austria) Leo Astl	15,569	
9	(Netherlands) Fernand Osther	15,451	
10	(Germany) Anton Kirstein	15,341	
