= 2026 Pro Golf Tour =

Golf tour season

2026 Pro Golf Tour season
- Duration: 19 February 2026 – 1 October 2026
- Number of official events: 21
- Most wins: (Netherlands) Dario Antonisse (2) (Germany) Nicolas Horder (2) (Belgium) Kristof Ulenaers (2)
- Order of Merit: (Netherlands) Dario Antonisse

The 2026 Pro Golf Tour was the 30th season of the Pro Golf Tour (formerly the EPD Tour), a third-tier tour recognised by the European Tour.

== Schedule ==
The following table lists official events during the 2026 season.

| Date | Tournament | Host country | Purse (€) | Winner (Note: The number in brackets after each winner's name is the number of Pro Golf Tour events they had won up to and including that tournament. It is rare for someone to accumulate many wins on the Pro Golf Tour as success at this level usually leads to promotion to the Challenge Tour.) | OWGR points |
|---|---|---|---|---|---|
| 21 Feb | Golf Mad Open | Turkey | 30,000 | (Netherlands) Dario Antonisse (2) | 0.56 |
| 25 Feb | Golf Mad Challenge | Turkey | 30,000 | (Poland) Alejandro Pedryc (1) | 0.58 |
| 9 Apr; ~~12 Mar~~ | Red Sea Ain Sokhna Open | Egypt | 35,000 | (Belgium) Kristof Ulenaers (1) | 0.49 |
| 14 Apr; ~~17 Mar~~ | Red Sea Egyptian Classic | Egypt | 35,000 | (Germany) Nicolas Horder (2) | 0.48 |
| 30 Apr | Haugschlag NÖ Open | Austria | 35,000 | (Netherlands) Koen Kouwenaar (2) | 0.80 |
| 12 May | Madaëf Golfs Open | Morocco | 35,000 | (Germany) Frederik Eisenbeis (1) | 0.51 |
| 16 May | Pro Golf Tour Océan | Morocco | 35,000 | (Germany) Velten Meyer (1) | 0.54 |
| 29 May | Sedin Open | Slovakia | 35,000 | (Netherlands) Dario Antonisse (3) | 0.59 |
| 4 Jun | Raiffeisen Pro Golf Tour St. Pölten | Austria | 35,000 | (Germany) Max Schmitt (4) | 0.43 |
| 11 Jun | VcG Bodensee Open | Germany | 40,000 | (Germany) Philipp Macionga (1) | 0.68 |
| 18 Jun | VcG Köln Open | Germany | 40,000 | (Switzerland) Loïc Naas (1) | 0.80 |
| 25 Jun | VcG Neuhof Open | Germany | 40,000 | (France) Alexandre d'Aurelle de Paladines (1) | 0.74 |
| 3 Jul | Gradi Polish Open | Poland | 35,000 | (Switzerland) Fiorino Clerici (2) | 0.59 |
| 23 Jul | Cuber Open | Germany | 35,000 | (Germany) Tim Tillmanns (1) | 0.68 |
| 29 Jul | Hormeta Pro Golf Tour Bonmont | Switzerland | 40,000 | (Germany) Nicolas Horder (3) | 0.75 |
| 15 Aug | Staan Open | Netherlands | 35,000 | (Switzerland) Mauro Gilardi (2) | 0.69 |
| 21 Aug | Mono Gelpenberg Open | Netherlands | 35,000 | (Germany) Laurenz Schiergen (1) | 0.75 |
| 27 Aug | Stippelberg Open | Netherlands | 35,000 | (Czech Republic) Dominik Pavouček (1) | 0.66 |
| 10 Sep | Iron Duke Belgian Open | Belgium | 35,000 | (Belgium) Kristof Ulenaers (2) | 0.64 |
| 17 Sep | Russo Open | Belgium | 35,000 | (France) Jules Lavigne (1) | 0.58 |
| 1 Oct | Hulencourt Masters Pro Golf Tour Grand Final | Belgium | 50,000 | (Slovenia) Jaka Babnik (1) | 0.48 |

== Order of Merit ==
The Order of Merit was based on tournament results during the season, calculated using a points-based system. The top five players on the Order of Merit (not otherwise exempt) earned status to play on the 2027 Challenge Tour (HotelPlanner Tour).

| Position | Player | Points | Status earned |
|---|---|---|---|
| 1 | (Netherlands) Dario Antonisse | 32,573 | Promoted to Challenge Tour |
| 2 | (Belgium) Kristof Ulenaers | 30,513 | Promoted to Challenge Tour |
| 3 | (Germany) Philipp Macionga | 26,195 | Qualified for Challenge Tour (made cut in Q School) |
| 4 | (Switzerland) Mauro Gilardi | 24,734 | Promoted to Challenge Tour |
| 5 | (Germany) Max Schmitt | 24,642 | Promoted to Challenge Tour |
| 6 | (Germany) Nicolas Horder | 20,967 | Promoted to Challenge Tour |
| 7 | (Germany) Tim Tillmanns | 20,607 | |
| 8 | (Germany) Velten Meyer | 19,027 | |
| 9 | (France) Louis Bonté | 17,912 | Qualified for Challenge Tour (made cut in Q School) |
| 10 | (Netherlands) Koen Kouwenaar | 17,759 | |
