= 2021 Pro Golf Tour =

Golf tour season

2021 Pro Golf Tour season
- Duration: 13 April 2021 – 6 October 2021
- Number of official events: 13
- Most wins: (Germany) Nick Bachem (2) (France) Mathieu Decottignies-Lafon (2)
- Order of Merit: (France) Mathieu Decottignies-Lafon

The 2021 Pro Golf Tour was the 25th season of the Pro Golf Tour (formerly the EPD Tour), a third-tier tour recognised by the European Tour.

== Schedule ==
The following table lists official events during the 2021 season.

Date	Tournament	Host country	Purse (€)	Winner (Note: The number in brackets after each winner's name is the number of Pro Golf Tour events they had won up to and including that tournament. It is rare for someone to accumulate many wins on the Pro Golf Tour as success at this level usually leads to promotion to the Challenge Tour.)	OWGR points
15 Apr	Red Sea Egyptian Classic	Egypt	30,000	(Poland) Mateusz Gradecki (3)	4
20 Apr	Red Sea Ain Sokhna Classic	Egypt	30,000	(Germany) Nick Bachem (a) (2)	4
30 Apr	Haugschlag NÖ Open	Austria	30,000	(Switzerland) Marco Iten (3)	4
29 May	NewGiza Pyramids Challenge	Egypt	30,000	(France) Mathieu Decottignies-Lafon (5)	4
3 Jun	Dreamlands Pyramids Classic	Egypt	30,000	(Portugal) Tomás Gouveia (1)	4
2 Jul	Gradi Polish Open	Poland	30,000	(Germany) Nick Bachem (a) (3)	4
8 Jul	Karolinka Golf Park Matchplay	Poland	30,000	(Slovakia) Peter Valášek (1)	4
22 Jul	Raiffeisen Pro Golf Tour St. Pölten	Austria	30,000	(Switzerland) Robert Foley (a) (1)	4
9 Aug	Wolf Open	Germany	30,000	(France) Mathieu Decottignies-Lafon (6)	4
18 Aug	Starnberg Open	Germany	30,000	(Germany) Michael Hirmer (2)	4
29 Aug	Altepro Trophy	Czech Republic	30,000	(Germany) Philipp Mejow (5)	4
4 Sep	FaberExposize Gelpenberg Open	Netherlands	30,000	(Germany) Freddy Schott (1)	4
6 Oct	Castanea Resort Championship	Germany	50,000	(Germany) Timo Vahlenkamp (1)	4

== Order of Merit ==
The Order of Merit was based on tournament results during the season, calculated using a points-based system. The top five players on the Order of Merit earned status to play on the 2022 Challenge Tour.

Position	Player	Points	Status earned
1	(France) Mathieu Decottignies-Lafon	17,977	Promoted to Challenge Tour
2	(Switzerland) Robert Foley	16,472	Promoted to Challenge Tour
3	(Germany) Nick Bachem	14,979	Promoted to Challenge Tour
4	(Portugal) Tomás Gouveia	14,162	Promoted to Challenge Tour
5	(Germany) Timo Vahlenkamp	13,562	Promoted to Challenge Tour
6	(Switzerland) Marco Iten	10,887	
7	(Germany) Christian Bräunig	9,149	
8	(Germany) Jannik de Bruyn	9,018	
9	(Germany) Finn Fleer	8,996	
10	(Germany) Benedict Staben	8,765	
