= 2023 Pro Golf Tour =

Golf tour season

2023 Pro Golf Tour season
- Duration: 14 March 2023 – 6 October 2023
- Number of official events: 14
- Most wins: (Germany) Christian Bräunig (2) (France) Andoni Etchenique (2) (Slovenia) Žan Luka Štirn (2) (Germany) Timo Vahlenkamp (2)
- Order of Merit: (Germany) Timo Vahlenkamp

The 2023 Pro Golf Tour was the 27th season of the Pro Golf Tour (formerly the EPD Tour), a third-tier tour recognised by the European Tour.

== Schedule ==
The following table lists official events during the 2023 season.

Date	Tournament	Host country	Purse (€)	Winner (Note: The number in brackets after each winner's name is the number of Pro Golf Tour events they had won up to and including that tournament. It is rare for someone to accumulate many wins on the Pro Golf Tour as success at this level usually leads to promotion to the Challenge Tour.)	OWGR points	Other tours (Note: ALP − Alps Tour.)
16 Mar	Red Sea Ain Sokhna Classic	Egypt	30,000	(Germany) Christian Bräunig (1)	0.43	
21 Mar	Red Sea Egyptian Classic	Egypt	30,000	(France) Clément Guichard (1)	0.44	
6 Apr	Little Venice Red Sea Open	Egypt	30,000	(Portugal) Pedro Lencart (1)	0.41	
11 Apr	Ein Bay Red Sea Open	Egypt	30,000	(France) Andoni Etchenique (1)	0.42	
28 Apr	Haugschlag NÖ Open	Austria	30,000	(Slovenia) Žan Luka Štirn (1)	0.61	
31 May	Riedhof Open	Germany	30,000	(Slovakia) Tadeáš Teťák (1)	0.52	
21 Jun	Tenerife Pro Golf Open	Spain	30,000	(Netherlands) Lars Keunen (n/a)	0.67	ALP
7 Jul	Gradi Polish Open	Poland	30,000	(France) Thomas Elissalde (1)	0.49	
19 Jul	Cuber Open	Germany	30,000	(Germany) Christian Bräunig (2)	0.52	
27 Jul	Raiffeisen Pro Golf Tour St. Pölten	Austria	30,000	(Germany) Nicklas Staub (1)	0.57	
19 Aug	Stippelberg Open	Netherlands	30,000	(Slovenia) Žan Luka Štirn (2)	0.55	
26 Aug	Staan Open	Netherlands	30,000	(France) Andoni Etchenique (2)	0.58	
2 Sep	FaberExposize Gelpenberg Open	Netherlands	30,000	(Germany) Timo Vahlenkamp (2)	0.58	
6 Oct	Castanea Resort Championship	Germany	50,000	(Germany) Timo Vahlenkamp (3)	0.38	

== Order of Merit ==
The Order of Merit was based on tournament results during the season, calculated using a points-based system. The top five players on the Order of Merit earned status to play on the 2024 Challenge Tour.

Position	Player	Points	Status earned
1	(Germany) Timo Vahlenkamp	21,490	Promoted to Challenge Tour
2	(France) Andoni Etchenique	21,382	Promoted to Challenge Tour
3	(France) Clément Guichard	19,390	Promoted to Challenge Tour
4	(Germany) Christian Bräunig	15,982	Promoted to Challenge Tour
5	(Slovenia) Žan Luka Štirn	15,827	Promoted to Challenge Tour
6	(Slovakia) Tadeáš Teťák	12,369	
7	(Netherlands) Mike Toorop	12,138	
8	(Wales) Owen Edwards	11,767	
9	(France) Antoine Pouguet	10,120	
10	(Finland) Alex Hietala	10,045	
