= 2024 Pro Golf Tour =

Golf tour season

2024 Pro Golf Tour season
- Duration: 23 January 2024 – 2 October 2024
- Number of official events: 17
- Most wins: (Switzerland) Cédric Gugler (3) (Belgium) James Meyer de Beco (3)
- Order of Merit: (Belgium) Yente van Doren

The 2024 Pro Golf Tour was the 28th season of the Pro Golf Tour (formerly the EPD Tour), a third-tier tour recognised by the European Tour.

== Schedule ==
The following table lists official events during the 2024 season.

Date	Tournament	Host country	Purse (€)	Winner (Note: The number in brackets after each winner's name is the number of Pro Golf Tour events they had won up to and including that tournament. It is rare for someone to accumulate many wins on the Pro Golf Tour as success at this level usually leads to promotion to the Challenge Tour.)	OWGR points
25 Jan	Red Sea Ain Sokhna Open	Egypt	30,000	(Switzerland) Fiorino Clerici (1)	0.41
30 Jan	Red Sea Egyptian Classic	Egypt	30,000	(Netherlands) Mike Toorop (1)	0.43
22 Feb	Golf Mad Open	Turkey	30,000	(Germany) Michael Hirmer (4)	0.49
26 Feb	Golf Mad Championship	Turkey	30,000	(Belgium) James Meyer de Beco (1)	0.52
14 Mar	Allegria Open	Egypt	30,000	(Switzerland) Cédric Gugler (1)	0.56
19 Mar	NewGiza Pyramids Challenge	Egypt	30,000	(Netherlands) Aydan Verdonk (1)	0.55
26 Apr	Haugschlag NÖ Open	Austria	30,000	(France) Jean Bekirian (Note: Bekirian changed his sporting nationality from France to Armenia in September 2024.) (4)	0.72
9 May	Raiffeisen Pro Golf Tour St. Pölten	Austria	30,000	(Belgium) Yente van Doren (2)	0.66
5 Jun	Royal Homburger Open	Germany	30,000	(Switzerland) Robert Foley (2)	0.58
13 Jun	Iron Duke Belgian Open	Belgium	30,000	(Switzerland) Cédric Gugler (2)	0.60
26 Jun	Cuber Open	Germany	30,000	(Belgium) James Meyer de Beco (2)	0.64
5 Jul	Gradi Polish Open	Poland	30,000	(Switzerland) Cédric Gugler (3)	0.65
24 Jul	Fairways Labs Open	Germany	30,000	(Slovakia) Tadeáš Teťák (2)	0.63
17 Aug	Staan Open	Netherlands	30,000	(Netherlands) Koen Kouwenaar (1)	0.74
23 Aug	Mono Gelpenberg Open	Netherlands	30,000	(Belgium) Yente van Doren (3)	0.62
29 Aug	Stippelberg Open	Netherlands	30,000	(Belgium) James Meyer de Beco (3)	0.57
2 Oct	Castanea Resort Championship	Germany	50,000	(Slovakia) Tadeáš Teťák (3)	0.55

== Order of Merit ==
The Order of Merit was based on tournament results during the season, calculated using a points-based system. The top five players on the Order of Merit (not otherwise exempt) earned status to play on the 2025 Challenge Tour (HotelPlanner Tour).

Position	Player	Points	Status earned
1	(Belgium) Yente van Doren	27,706	Promoted to Challenge Tour
2	(Belgium) James Meyer de Beco	25,920	Promoted to Challenge Tour
3	(Slovakia) Tadeáš Teťák	24,615	Qualified for European Tour (Top 20 in Q School)
4	(Armenia) Jean Bekirian	23,824	Qualified for European Tour (Top 20 in Q School)
5	(Switzerland) Cédric Gugler	20,751	Finished in Top 170 of Race to Dubai as a non-member
6	(Netherlands) Aydan Verdonk	14,702	Promoted to Challenge Tour
7	(France) Clément Charmasson	13,793	Promoted to Challenge Tour
8	(Switzerland) Robert Foley	13,534	Promoted to Challenge Tour
9	(Netherlands) Koen Kouwenaar	12,985	
10	(France) Mathieu Decottignies-Lafon	12,736	
