= Florian Fritsch =

German professional golfer (born 1985)

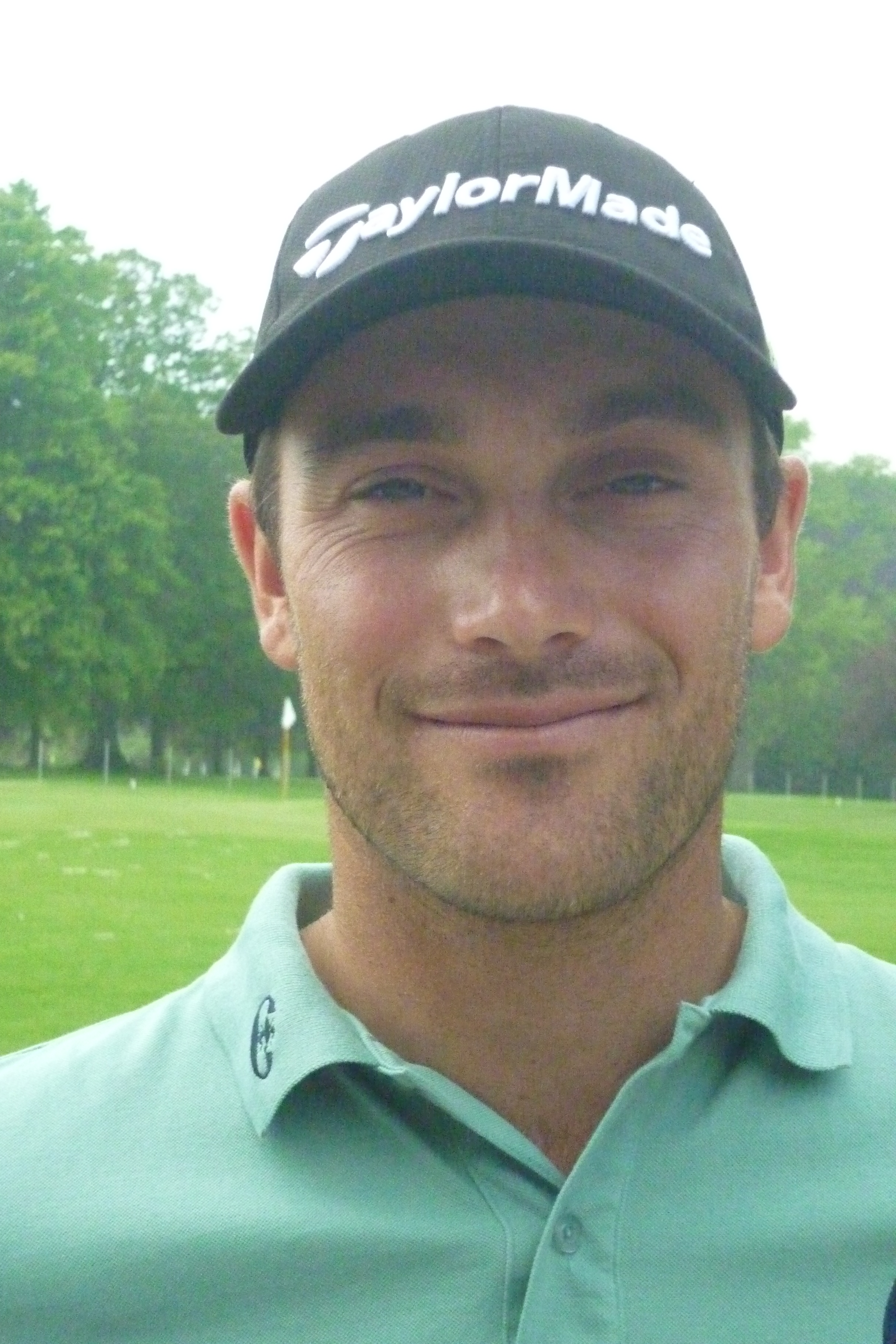

Personal information
- Nationality: Germany
- Born: 29 October 1985 (age 41) Munich, Germany
- Height: 1.80 m (5 ft 11 in)
- Weight: 90 kg (198 lb; 14 st 2 lb)

Career
- Sport: Golf
- College: University of South Carolina
- Turned professional: 2009
- Current tours: European Tour; Challenge Tour
- Former tour: Pro Golf Tour
- Professional wins: 9

Achievements and awards
- Pro Golf Tour Order of Merit winner: 2013

Florian Fritsch (born 29 October 1985) is a German professional golfer who currently plays on the European Tour.

== Career ==
Fritsch was born in Munich, Germany, and attended the University of South Carolina in the United States, graduating in 2008. He turned professional in early 2009, and almost became the third golfer, after countryman Martin Kaymer, and Italian Edoardo Molinari, ever to win on their Challenge Tour début, when he lost to Lee S. James in a playoff for the Allianz Open Côtes d'Armor Bretagne.

In 2010, he quit professional golf because of a fear of flying that developed through the years after a flight where he experienced huge clear-air turbulences. After a few months he took up his professional career again. He only played in tournaments he could reach by car or by train. Nevertheless he reached the final qualifying stage of the European Tour and earned his card for the 2011 season.

After finishing 125th on the 2015 Race to Dubai and missing the full-card for the 2016 season, in 2016 he finished 101st thanks to his T7 placements in the Omega European Masters, at the Porsche European Open and at the Alfred Dunhill Links Championship. He secured his full-card for 2017 playing just 12 tournaments, due to his flying fears and his low-ranking spot in 2016.

== Professional wins (9) ==
=== Pro Golf Tour wins (6) ===
No.	Date	Tournament	Winning score	Margin of victory	Runner(s)-up
1	7 May 2009	Gut Winterbrock Classic	−11 (72-65-68=205)	Playoff	(Germany) Max Kramer
2	19 May 2010	Heidelberg Lobenfeld Classic	−9 (69-67-68=204)	6 strokes	(Germany) Stephan Gross, (Germany) Max Kramer
3	9 May 2013	GreenEagle Classic	−3 (70-76-70=216)	3 strokes	(Germany) Dennis Küpper, (Austria) Berni Reiter
4	7 Jun 2013	Land Fleesensee Classic	−17 (68-66-65=199)	1 stroke	(Netherlands) Fernand Osther
5	24 Jul 2013	Lotos Polish Open	−9 (69-70-68=207)	Playoff	(Germany) Anton Kirstein
6	3 Sep 2013	Preis des Hardenberg GolfResort	−5 (69-72-70=211)	2 strokes	(Belgium) Christopher Mivis, (Germany) Marcel Schneider

=== Nordic Golf League wins (1) ===
No.	Date	Tournament	Winning score	Margin of victory	Runner-up
1	16 Feb 2017	Mediter Real Estate Masters	−17 (69-60-66=195)	7 strokes	(Norway) Kristoffer Reitan (a)

=== Hi5 Pro Tour wins (1) ===
No.	Date	Tournament	Winning score	Margin of victory	Runners-up
1	10 Feb 2011	El Valle Open	−11 (69-71-62=202)	1 stroke	(Northern Ireland) Jonathan Caldwell, (Spain) Miguel Ángel Martín

=== Other wins (1) ===
No.	Date	Tournament	Winning score	Margin of victory	Runner-up
1	1 Aug 2013	HDI Gerling German PGA Championship	−15 (64-70-72-67=273)	2 strokes	(Germany) Marcel Schneider

== Playoff record ==
Challenge Tour playoff record (0–3)

No.	Year	Tournament	Opponent	Result
1	2009	Allianz Open Côtes d'Armor Bretagne	(England) Lee S. James	Lost to birdie on first extra hole
2	2014	Belgian Challenge Open	(England) William Harrold	Lost to par on first extra hole
3	2014	EMC Golf Challenge Open	(Portugal) Ricardo Gouveia	Lost to birdie on third extra hole

== Team appearances ==
Amateur

- European Boys' Team Championship (representing Germany): 2003
- European Youths' Team Championship (representing Germany): 2004, 2006
- Eisenhower Trophy (representing Germany): 2004, 2006
- European Amateur Team Championship (representing Germany): 2005, 2007, 2008

== See also ==
- 2010 European Tour Qualifying School graduates
- 2014 Challenge Tour graduates
