= 2020 Challenge Tour =

Golf tour season

2020 Challenge Tour season
- Duration: 30 January 2020 – 22 November 2020
- Number of official events: 11 (Note: A further 17 tournaments were scheduled but were either cancelled, postponed or otherwise removed from the schedule.)
- Most wins: (Czech Republic) Ondřej Lieser (2)
- Rankings: (Czech Republic) Ondřej Lieser

The 2020 Challenge Tour was the 32nd season of the Challenge Tour, the official development tour to the European Tour.

== In-season changes ==
After beginning with three tournaments in South Africa co-sanctioned with the Sunshine Tour, the remainder of the season was severely impacted by the COVID-19 pandemic, with many tournaments being cancelled or postponed.

== Schedule ==
The following table lists official events during the 2020 season.

Date	Tournament	Host country	Purse (€)	Winner (Note: The number in brackets after each winner's name is the number of Challenge Tour events they had won up to and including that tournament. This information is only shown for Challenge Tour members. It is rare for someone to accumulate many wins on the Challenge Tour as success at this level usually leads to promotion to the European Tour.)	OWGR points	Other tours (Note: AFR − Sunshine Tour; CHN − China Tour; EUR − European Tour.)	Notes
2 Feb	Limpopo Championship	South Africa	US$250,000	(South Africa) J. C. Ritchie (1)	13	AFR	New to Challenge Tour
9 Feb	RAM Cape Town Open	South Africa	US$250,000	(Sweden) Anton Karlsson (1)	13	AFR	New to Challenge Tour
16 Feb	Dimension Data Pro-Am	South Africa	US$340,000	(South Africa) Christiaan Bezuidenhout (n/a)	13	AFR	New to Challenge Tour; Pro-Am
~~10 May~~	Prague Golf Challenge	Czech Republic	–	Cancelled	–		
~~7 Jun~~	D+D Real Czech Challenge	Czech Republic	–	Cancelled	–		
~~14 Jun~~	Andalucía Match Play 9	Spain	–	Postponed	–		
~~5 Jul~~	D+D Real Slovakia Challenge	Slovakia	–	Cancelled	–		
~~12 Jul~~	Le Vaudreuil Golf Challenge	France	–	Cancelled	–		
12 Jul (Note: Tournament added to the schedule as part of changes due to the COVID-19 pandemic.)	Austrian Open	Austria	500,000	(Scotland) Marc Warren (3)	18	EUR	
18 Jul	Euram Bank Open	Austria	500,000	(France) Joël Stalter (2)	18	EUR	
~~26 Jul~~	Vierumäki Finnish Challenge	Finland	–	Cancelled	–		
~~9 Aug~~; ~~31 May~~	Swiss Challenge	Switzerland	–	Cancelled	–		
~~15 Aug~~	Made in Denmark Challenge	Denmark	–	Cancelled	–		
~~22 Aug~~	Rolex Trophy	Switzerland	–	Cancelled	–		
~~29 Aug~~	B-NL Challenge Trophy	Netherlands	–	Cancelled	–		New tournament
~~6 Sep~~	Open de Bretagne	France	–	Cancelled	–		
6 Sep	Northern Ireland Open	Northern Ireland	200,000	(United States) Tyler Koivisto (1)	12		
~~13 Sep~~	Irish Challenge	Republic of Ireland	–	Cancelled	–		
20 Sep	Open de Portugal	Portugal	500,000	(South Africa) Garrick Higgo (1)	18	EUR	
~~27 Sep~~	Hopps Open de Provence	France	–	Cancelled	–		
~~4 Oct~~	Lalla Aïcha Challenge Tour	Morocco	–	Cancelled (Note: Cancelled due to the COVID-19 pandemic.)	–		
4 Oct (Note: Rescheduled due to the COVID-19 pandemic.); ~~28 Jun~~	Italian Challenge Open Eneos Motor Oil	Italy	300,000	(Germany) Hurly Long (1)	12		
~~11 Oct~~; ~~21 Jun~~	Hauts de France – Pas de Calais Golf Open	France	–	Cancelled	–		
~~18 Oct~~	Hainan Open	China	–	Cancelled	–	CHN	
~~25 Oct~~	Foshan Open	China	–	Cancelled	–	CHN	
8 Nov; ~~17 May~~	Andalucía Challenge de España	Spain	200,000	(Czech Republic) Ondřej Lieser (1)	12		
14 Nov	Andalucía Challenge de Cádiz	Spain	200,000	(Spain) Pep Anglès (1)	12		New tournament
22 Nov; ~~8 Nov~~	Challenge Tour Grand Final	Spain	350,000	(Czech Republic) Ondřej Lieser (2)	17		Flagship event

== Rankings ==
The rankings were titled as the Road to Mallorca and were based on tournament results during the season, calculated using a points-based system. The top five players on the rankings earned limited status to play on the 2021 European Tour.

Rank	Player	Points
1	(Czech Republic) Ondřej Lieser	116,345
2	(Germany) Marcel Schneider	98,500
3	(Spain) Pep Anglès	92,688
4	(England) Richard Mansell	84,534
5	(England) Matt Ford	69,948
