= Italian Challenge =

Italian Challenge Open
Tournament information
- Location: Sutri, Italy
- Established: 2007
- Course: Golf Nazionale
- Par: 72
- Length: 7,033 yards (6,431 m)
- Tour: Challenge Tour
- Format: Stroke play
- Prize fund: €300,000
- Month played: September

Tournament record score
- Aggregate: 260 Joel Sjöholm (2017)
- To par: −24 as above

Current champion
- (England) Chris Wood

Final champion
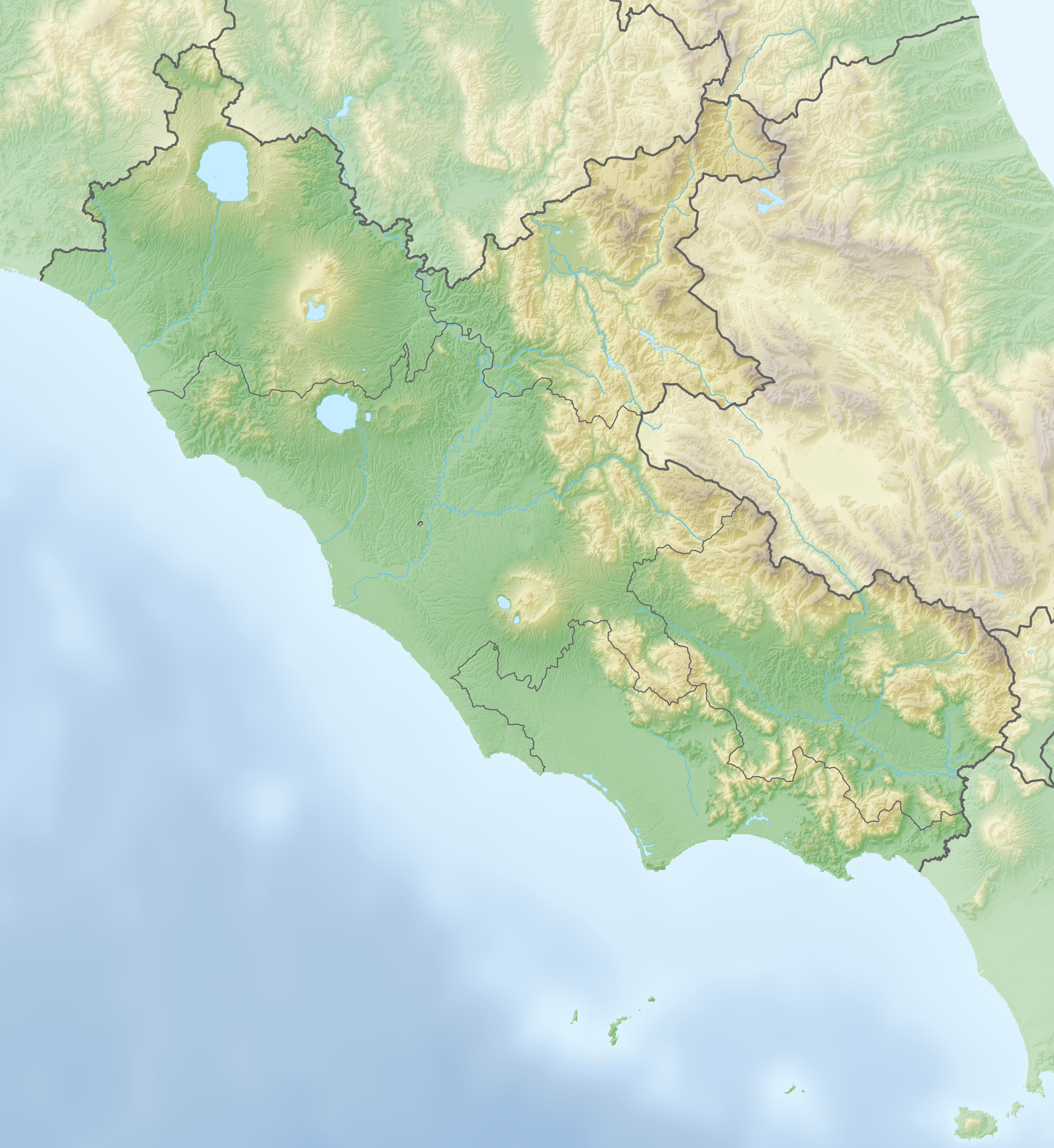
- Location in Italy Location in Lazio

The Italian Challenge is a golf tournament on the Challenge Tour. It was first played in 2007.

== Winners ==
Year	Winner	Score	To par	Margin of victory	Runner(s)-up	Venue
Italian Challenge Open
2026	(England) Chris Wood	266	−22	1 stroke	(Portugal) Tomás Gouveia	Golf Nazionale
2025	(South Africa) J. C. Ritchie	268	−20	2 strokes	(Sweden) Robin Petersson (Sweden) Christofer Rahm	Golf Nazionale
2024	(England) John Parry	266	−18	1 stroke	(South Africa) Justin Walters	Argentario
2023	(Italy) Matteo Manassero	267	−21	3 strokes	(England) Will Enefer	Golf Nazionale
2022	(Norway) Kristian Krogh Johannessen	273	−11	Playoff	(Denmark) Oliver Hundebøll	Golf Nazionale
Italian Challenge
2021	(Portugal) Ricardo Gouveia (2)	268	−16	2 strokes	(Austria) Lukas Nemecz	Margara
Italian Challenge Open Eneos Motor Oil
2020	(Germany) Hurly Long	203 (Note: Shortened to 54 holes due to rain.)	−13	Playoff	(England) Matt Ford (Germany) Marcel Schneider	Terre Dei Consoli
2019	(England) Matthew Jordan	271	−17	Playoff	(Italy) Lorenzo Scalise	Terre Dei Consoli
Italian Challenge
2018	(Sweden) Sebastian Söderberg	267	−17	1 stroke	(Norway) Eirik Tage Johansen	Is Molas
Italian Challenge Open
2017	(Sweden) Joel Sjöholm	260	−24	4 strokes	(United States) Chase Koepka (Scotland) Bradley Neil	Is Molas
Terre dei Consoli Open
2016	(Sweden) Johan Edfors	275	−13	3 strokes	(Sweden) Alexander Björk (Spain) Jordi García Pinto	Terre Dei Consoli
EMC Challenge Open
2015	(Italy) Matteo Delpodio	279	−5	3 strokes	(England) Gary Boyd	Olgiata
EMC Golf Challenge Open
2014	(Portugal) Ricardo Gouveia	275	−9	Playoff	(Germany) Florian Fritsch	Olgiata
Roma Golf Open
2012–13: No tournament
2011	(England) Sam Little	273	−11	Playoff	(Sweden) Pelle Edberg	Olgiata
2010	(Denmark) Andreas Hartø	265	−19	Playoff	(Sweden) Joel Sjöholm	Olgiata
Italian Federation Cup
2009	(Italy) Edoardo Molinari	267	−21	1 stroke	(Belgium) Nicolas Colsaerts	Olgiata
Margara Diehl-Ako Platinum Open
2008	(Netherlands) Taco Remkes	270	−18	Playoff	(Finland) Roope Kakko	Margara
Toscana Open Italian Federation Cup
2007	(Sweden) Mikael Lundberg	268	−16	5 strokes	(Republic of Ireland) Stephen Browne	Le Pavoniere
