= Hurly Long =

German professional golfer

Personal information
- Full name: Christopher Herlihy Long
- Nationality: Germany
- Born: 21 July 1995 (age 31) Heidelberg, Germany

Career
- Sport: Golf
- College: University of Oregon; Texas Tech University
- Turned professional: 2019
- Current tour: European Tour
- Former tours: Pro Golf Tour; Challenge Tour
- Professional wins: 2

Number of wins by tour
- Challenge Tour: 1
- Other: 1

Best results in major championships
- Masters Tournament: DNP
- PGA Championship: DNP
- U.S. Open: DNP
- The Open Championship: T41: 2023

Achievements and awards
- Pro Golf Tour Order of Merit winner: 2019

Christopher Herlihy "Hurly" Long (born 21 July 1995) is a German professional golfer who plays on the European Tour. He won the 2020 Italian Challenge Open Eneos Motor Oil on the Challenge Tour.

== Amateur career ==
Long attended Texas Tech University from 2015 to 2018, having been a freshman at the University of Oregon in 2014/15. He won the 2017 Carmel Cup after a playoff, which included a second-round 61 to set a new course record at Pebble Beach. He was part of the German team in three Eisenhower Trophy tournaments: 2014, 2016 and 2018.

== Professional career ==
Long turned professional at the start of 2019 and played on the Pro Golf Tour in his first year as a professional. He had a successful season, winning the Raiffeisen Pro Golf Tour St. Pölten in July after a final round of 60. During the season he was also runner-up three times, third twice and had 7 other top-10 finishes. He won the Order of Merit and gained a place on the Challenge Tour for 2020.

Long had little success on the 2020 Challenge Tour until he won the Italian Challenge Open Eneos Motor Oil in early October, an event reduced to 54 holes by bad weather. Long won with a birdie at the second hole of a playoff.

== Personal life ==
Long was born on 21 July 1995, in Heidelberg, Germany to an American father and a German mother. His father Ted Long is a former Challenge Tour player who later became a teaching professional, while his mother Susanna was a flight attendant. His father started to show him golf videos when he was two weeks old, and he began playing the game at the age of two.

== Amateur wins ==
- 2013 Doral-Publix Junior Classic 16–18
- 2016 German International Amateur Championship
- 2017 The Carmel Cup

== Professional wins (2) ==
=== Challenge Tour wins (1) ===
No.	Date	Tournament	Winning score	Margin of victory	Runners-up
1	4 Oct 2020	Italian Challenge Open Eneos Motor Oil	−13 (67-66-70=203) (Note: Shortened to 54 holes due to weather.)	Playoff	(England) Matt Ford, (Germany) Marcel Schneider

Challenge Tour playoff record (1–0)

No.	Year	Tournament	Opponents	Result
1	2020	Italian Challenge Open Eneos Motor Oil	(England) Matt Ford, (Germany) Marcel Schneider	Won with birdie on second extra hole Schneider eliminated by par on first hole

=== Pro Golf Tour wins (1) ===
No.	Date	Tournament	Winning score	Margin of victory	Runners-up
1	25 Jul 2019	Raiffeisen Pro Golf Tour St. Pölten	−24 (64-65-60=189)	4 strokes	(Netherlands) Dylan Boshart, (Netherlands) Robbie van West

== Results in major championships ==
Tournament	2023
Masters Tournament	
PGA Championship	
U.S. Open	
The Open Championship	T41

Did not play

"T" = tied

== Team appearances ==
Amateur

- Eisenhower Trophy (representing Germany): 2014, 2016, 2018
- Arnold Palmer Cup (representing the International team): 2018
- European Amateur Team Championship (representing Germany): 2014, 2015, 2016, 2017, 2018

== See also ==
- 2021 Challenge Tour graduates
