= Marcel Schneider (golfer) =

German professional golfer

Personal information
- Nationality: Germany
- Born: 6 February 1990 (age 36) Bietigheim-Bissingen, Germany

Career
- Sport: Golf
- Turned professional: 2012
- Current tour: European Tour
- Former tours: Challenge Tour; Pro Golf Tour
- Professional wins: 5

Number of wins by tour
- Challenge Tour: 3
- Other: 2

Best results in major championships
- Masters Tournament: DNP
- PGA Championship: DNP
- U.S. Open: CUT: 2022
- The Open Championship: CUT: 2021

Achievements and awards
- Pro Golf Tour Order of Merit winner: 2014

Marcel Schneider (born 6 February 1990) is a German professional golfer who plays on the European Tour and the Challenge Tour. He has won three times on the Challenge Tour, the 2018 Swiss Challenge and the 2021 Kaskáda Golf Challenge and Open de Portugal.

== Amateur career ==
Schneider had a successful year in 2012. At the start of the year, he won the Australian Amateur beating Daniel Nisbet at the 37th hole in the final. During the year he played in the Bonallack Trophy and the St Andrews Trophy and he was part of the German team that took a joint bronze medal in the Eisenhower Trophy in Turkey. He turned professional at the end of 2012.

== Professional career ==
Schneider played on the Pro Golf Tour in 2013 and 2014. 2014 was a successful year with two victories and he led the Order of Merit. That gave him entry to the Second Stage of the European Tour Qualifying School. He then finished 73rd in the final stage, to earn a place on the Challenge Tour.

From 2015 to 2020 Schneider mostly played on the Challenge Tour. In 2015 he was joint runner-up in the Gant Open in Finland. In 2018 he won the Swiss Challenge and was runner-up in the Rolex Trophy. In 2020 he was runner-up in the Austrian Open and lost in a playoff for the Italian Challenge Open Eneos Motor Oil. He finished second in the 2020 Challenge Tour Order of Merit to gain limited playing opportunities on the 2021 European Tour. In July 2021, playing in his first Challenge Tour event of the season, he had his second success on the tour, winning the Kaskáda Golf Challenge by one stroke. The win also gave him an entry into the 2021 Open Championship, his first major championship.

== Amateur wins ==
- 2009 Austrian Amateur
- 2012 Australian Amateur

== Professional wins (5) ==
=== Challenge Tour wins (3) ===
No.	Date	Tournament	Winning score	Margin of victory	Runner(s)-up
1	3 Jun 2018	Swiss Challenge	−22 (63-64-68-67=262)	6 strokes	(Norway) Kristian Krogh Johannessen
2	4 Jul 2021	Kaskáda Golf Challenge	−16 (65-65-71-67=284)	1 stroke	(New Zealand) Josh Geary, (Australia) Dimitrios Papadatos, (Italy) Lorenzo Scalise
3	26 Sep 2021	Open de Portugal	−19 (68-66-65-70=269)	1 stroke	(France) Frédéric Lacroix

Challenge Tour playoff record (0–2)

No.	Year	Tournament	Opponents	Result
1	2020	Italian Challenge Open Eneos Motor Oil	(England) Matt Ford, (Germany) Hurly Long	Long won with birdie on second extra hole Schneider eliminated by par on first hole
2	2021	Hopps Open de Provence	(Austria) Lukas Nemecz, (England) Alfie Plant	Plant won with birdie on first extra hole

=== Pro Golf Tour wins (2) ===
No.	Date	Tournament	Winning score	Margin of victory	Runner-up
1	12 Feb 2014	Open Mogador	−7 (68-71-70=209)	5 strokes	(Germany) Max Kramer
2	10 Apr 2014	Open Madaef	−6 (71-71-68=210)	2 strokes	(Netherlands) Floris de Vries

== Results in major championships ==
Tournament	2021	2022
Masters Tournament		
PGA Championship		
U.S. Open		CUT
The Open Championship	CUT	

Did not play

CUT = missed the half-way cut

== Team appearances ==
Amateur

- European Boys' Team Championship (representing Germany): 2007
- Bonallack Trophy (representing Europe): 2012 (winners)
- St Andrews Trophy (representing the Continent of Europe): 2012 (winners)
- European Amateur Team Championship (representing Germany): 2011
- Eisenhower Trophy (representing Germany): 2012

== See also ==
- 2017 European Tour Qualifying School graduates
- 2021 Challenge Tour graduates
