= Pro Golf Tour =

Professional golf tour

- Current season, competition or edition: 2026 Pro Golf Tour
- Formerly: EPD Tour; Renault EPD Tour; Pro Tour Esprit
- Sport: Golf
- Founded: 1997
- Founder: Wayne Hachey
- First season: 1997
- Countries: Based in Central Europe (Note: Schedules have also included events in Egypt, France, Morocco, Spain and Turkey.)
- Most titles: Tournament wins: (Germany) Marcel Haremza (12)
- Website: https://www.progolftour.de/

The Pro Golf Tour, formerly the EPD Tour (European Professional Development Tour), is a developmental professional golf tour based in Germany. It is a third-level tour, the highest level of men's golf in Europe being the European Tour, and the second level being the Challenge Tour. The other third-level tours in Europe are the United Kingdom-based Tartan Pro Tour and Clutch Pro Tour, the Alps Tour, which is sanctioned by the national golf unions of several countries, including France and Italy, and the Nordic Golf League in the Nordic countries. Starting in July 2015, third-level tours carry Official World Golf Ranking points.

== History ==
The EPD Tour was established by Canadian golf professional Wayne Hachey in 1997 and has been recognised as an official third-tier tour by the European Tour since 2001. In 2005, the PGA of Germany took over the EPD Tour. The top ten players on the Order of Merit are awarded a bypass to the second stage of European Tour Qualifying School. The five leading non-exempt players earn status to play on the second-tier Challenge Tour for the following season.

In January 2013, the tour was renamed as the Pro Golf Tour.

EPD Tour alumni include major winner Martin Kaymer, as well as Tobias Dier and Marcel Siem, who have all went on to win on the European Tour.

== Order of Merit winners ==
Year	Winner	Points
2026	(Netherlands) Dario Antonisse	32,573
2025	(Netherlands) Lars van der Vight	25,158
2024	(Belgium) Yente van Doren	27,706
2023	(Germany) Timo Vahlenkamp	21,490
2022	(Germany) Michael Hirmer	17,785
2021	(France) Mathieu Decottignies-Lafon	17,977
2020	(Germany) Thomas Rosenmüller	25,364
2019	(Germany) Hurly Long	28,999
2018	(Scotland) Craig Howie	23,481
2017	(Germany) Nicolai von Dellingshausen	29,651
2016	(France) Antoine Schwartz	22,105
2015	(Germany) Philipp Mejow	35,311
2014	(Germany) Marcel Schneider	29,666
2013	(Germany) Florian Fritsch	29,278
Year	Winner	Prize money (€)
2012	(Germany) Marcel Haremza	26,362
2011	(Netherlands) Reinier Saxton	34,809
2010	(Germany) Benjamin Miarka	25,641
2009	(Germany) Bernd Ritthammer	25,319
2008	(England) James Ruth	23,441
2007	(Germany) Tino Schuster	25,287
2006	(Germany) Martin Kaymer	26,664
2005	(Germany) Nicolas Meitinger	20,280
2004	(Denmark) Søren Juul	22,750
2003	(England) Darren Leng	18,208
2002	(Germany) Richard Porter	15,104
2001	(Saint Lucia) Regis Gustave	8,973
Year	Winner	Points
2000	(Czech Republic) Karel Skopový	2,025
1999	No information known	
1998	No information known	
1997	No information known	
