= 2018 European Tour Qualifying School graduates =

Golf qualifying tournament in Spain

2018 European Tour Qualifying School Final Stage
Tournament information
- Dates: 10–15 November 2018
- Location: Tarragona, Spain; 41.079°N 1.162°E
- Courses: Lumine Golf Club (Lakes & Hills Courses)
- Tours: European Tour (unofficial event)

Statistics
- Par: 71 (L); 72 (H)
- Length: 6,909 yards (6,318 m) (L); 6,975 yards (6,378 m) (H)
- Field: 156, 77 after cut
- Cut: 280 (−6)

Champion
- (Spain) Alejandro Cañizares
- 404 (−24)

Location map
- Location in Spain Location in Catalonia

The 2018 European Tour Qualifying School graduates were determined following the conclusion of the 2018 European Tour Qualifying School Final Stage which was played 10–15 November at Lumine Golf Club in Tarragona, Spain. It was the 43rd edition of the European Tour Qualifying School. The top 25 and ties (27 in total) earned status to play on the 2019 European Tour, with the remaining players who finished outside the top 25 and ties, but having made the 72-hole cut, earning status to play on the 2019 Challenge Tour.

Alejandro Cañizares won the event, scoring a six-round total of 404 (24 under par), beating Zander Lombard on countback; Cañizares shot 64 in the final round, compared to Lombard's 68.

Graduates who went on to win on the European Tour in 2019 included Kurt Kitayama who won twice, with wins at the AfrAsia Bank Mauritius Open (December 2018) and the Oman Open. Guido Migliozzi also won twice in 2019, with wins at the Magical Kenya Open and the Belgian Knockout.

== Results ==
The top 25 players (including ties) earned status to play on the 2019 European Tour. They were as follows:

Place	Player	Score	To par
1	(Spain) Alejandro Cañizares	65-71-64-74-66-64=404	−24
2	(South Africa) Zander Lombard	64-68-70-70-64-68=404	−24
T3	(Denmark) Jeff Winther	65-70-68-70-64-68=405	−23
T3	(United States) Kurt Kitayama	70-65-70-65-66-69=405	−23
5	(France) Romain Langasque	70-65-70-65-66-70=406	−22
T6	(Sweden) Niklas Lemke	68-64-71-69-70-65=407	−21
T6	(Germany) Bernd Ritthammer	65-70-69-69-65-69=407	−21
T6	(France) Clément Sordet	70-66-63-68-71-69=407	−21
T9	(Spain) Iván Cantero	65-68-70-68-70-67=408	−20
T9	(Sweden) Anton Karlsson	67-64-71-67-68-71=408	−20
T11	(Japan) Masahiro Kawamura	67-68-70-69-67-68=409	−19
T11	(England) Scott Gregory	69-71-62-72-66-69=409	−19
T13	(South Africa) Louis de Jager	71-66-71-67-70-65=410	−18
T13	(Sweden) Per Längfors	70-72-67-69-65-67=410	−18
T13	(Italy) Guido Migliozzi	70-65-72-66-68-69=410	−18
T13	(Australia) Nick Cullen	70-64-71-67-69-69=410	−18
T13	(Australia) Deyen Lawson	65-70-71-71-63-70=410	−18
T13	(England) Daniel Gavins	62-69-66-69-63-71=410	−18
19	(Scotland) Marc Warren	68-67-73-69-66-68=411	−17
T20	(Italy) Filippo Bergamaschi	67-69-69-68-73-66=412	−16
T20	(Norway) Kristian Krogh Johannessen	69-67-70-69-70-67=412	−16
T20	(Chile) Hugo León	71-67-67-70-66-71=412	−16
T20	(Republic of Ireland) Gavin Moynihan	68-66-71-70-66-71=412	−16
T20	(Germany) Max Schmitt	62-71-70-68-70-71=412	−16
T20	(Spain) David Borda	65-62-72-70-72-71=412	−16
T20	(Norway) Kristoffer Reitan	63-70-71-67-69-72=412	−16
T20	(England) Ben Evans	68-67-71-68-65-73=412	−16

The following players made the 72 hole cut, however finished outside the top 25 and ties, therefore earning status to play on the 2019 Challenge Tour.

- (Denmark) Martin Simonsen (T28)
- (England) Joe Dean (T28)
- (Scotland) Duncan Stewart (T28)
- (Northern Ireland) Cormac Sharvin (T28)
- (New Zealand) Josh Geary (T28)
- (Portugal) José-Filipe Lima (T28)
- (Sweden) Henric Sturehed (T28)
- (United States) Berry Henson (T28)
- (Germany) Christian Bräunig (T28)
- (Switzerland) Raphaël De Sousa (T37)
- (France) Ugo Coussaud (T37)
- (Sweden) Anton Wejshag (T37)
- (France) Matthieu Fenasse (T37)
- (Germany) Alexander Knappe (T37)
- (France) Sébastien Gros (T37)
- (Wales) David Boote (T37)
- (England) Chris Hanson (T37)
- (France) Clément Berardo (T45)
- (United States) Paul Peterson (T45)
- (Germany) Marcel Schneider (T45)
- (South Korea) Kim Min-kyu (T45)
- (Germany) Marcel Siem (T45)
- (Denmark) Anders Hansen (T45)
- (Spain) Pep Anglès (T51)
- (Germany) Philipp Mejow (T51)
- (Norway) Eirik Tage Johansen (T51)
- (France) Grégory Havret (T51)
- (Sweden) Oscar Lengdén (T55)
- (South Africa) Bryce Easton (T55)
- (Scotland) Connor Syme (T57)
- (England) Laurie Canter (T57)
- (France) Antoine Rozner (T57)
- (France) Grégory Bourdy (T57)
- (Spain) Scott Fernández (T57)
- (United States) David Cooke (T57)
- (Scotland) Craig Ross (T63)
- (Denmark) Christian Gløët (T63)
- (Netherlands) Daan Huizing (T63)
- (England) Nick McCarthy (T63)
- (Sweden) Simon Forsström (T67)
- (England) Ryan Evans (T67)
- (England) Jonathan Thomson (T67)
- (Denmark) Nicolai Tinning (T67)
- (England) Paul Maddy (71)
- (Canada) Aaron Cockerill (72)
- (Republic of Ireland) Robin Dawson (T73)
- (Spain) Eduardo de la Riva (T73)
- (Spain) Emilio Cuartero (T73)
- (England) Jamie Abbott (T73)
- (Belgium) Hugues Joannes (77)

== Graduates ==
Place	Player	Career ET starts	Cuts made	Best finish
1	(Spain) Alejandro Cañizares	294	194	Win (x2)
2	(South Africa) Zander Lombard	68	26	2nd
T3	(Denmark) Jeff Winther	67	32	2nd
T3	(United States) Kurt Kitayama (Note: European Tour rookie in 2019)	1	1	T46
5	(France) Romain Langasque	40	18	3rd
T6	(Sweden) Niklas Lemke (Note: First-time full European Tour member in 2019, but ineligible for rookie status)	27	8	3rd
T6	(Germany) Bernd Ritthammer	80	26	T7
T6	(France) Clément Sordet	36	15	T10
T9	(Spain) Iván Cantero	2	0	CUT
T9	(Sweden) Anton Karlsson	16	5	T13
T11	(Japan) Masahiro Kawamura	30	17	T9
T11	(England) Scott Gregory	7	1	T56
T13	(South Africa) Louis de Jager	49	23	4th
T13	(Sweden) Per Längfors	1	0	CUT
T13	(Italy) Guido Migliozzi	6	1	T26
T13	(Australia) Nick Cullen	39	25	T8
T13	(Australia) Deyen Lawson	9	5	T24
T13	(England) Daniel Gavins	18	4	T28
19	(Scotland) Marc Warren	368	205	Win (x3)
T20	(Italy) Filippo Bergamaschi	13	2	T48
T20	(Norway) Kristian Krogh Johannessen	5	4	T34
T20	(Chile) Hugo León	5	2	T62
T20	(Republic of Ireland) Gavin Moynihan	20	5	T8
T20	(Germany) Max Schmitt	3	1	T59
T20	(Spain) David Borda	0	0	n/a
T20	(Norway) Kristoffer Reitan	2	0	CUT
T20	(England) Ben Evans	100	44	T3

=== 2019 European Tour Results ===
Player	Starts	Cuts made	Best finish	R2D rank	Prize money (€)
(Spain) Alejandro Cañizares (Note: Cañizares and Lemke retained their European Tour cards for 2020 by finishing inside the top 25 (including ties) at the 2019 European Tour Qualifying School.)	21	11	T9	138	212,846
(South Africa) Zander Lombard	28	16	T3	59	642,971
(Denmark) Jeff Winther	21	16	T4	91	368,837
(United States) Kurt Kitayama	31	23	Win (x2)	14	1,732,419
(France) Romain Langasque	28	20	2	24	1,301,118
(Sweden) Niklas Lemke	25	13	T7	118	299,187
(Germany) Bernd Ritthammer	26	11	T2	126	259,946
(France) Clément Sordet	22	12	T2	119	256,906
(Spain) Iván Cantero	21	5	T23	234	30,102
(Sweden) Anton Karlsson	23	12	T2	136	191,959
(Japan) Masahiro Kawamura	27	18	2	56	626,889
(England) Scott Gregory	18	1	T28	269	17,800
(South Africa) Louis de Jager	26	11	T2	123	255,670
(Sweden) Per Längfors	22	5	9	187	74,143
(Italy) Guido Migliozzi	28	17	Win (x2)	40	845,370
(Australia) Nick Cullen	20	8	T14	191	70,635
(Australia) Deyen Lawson	24	9	T26	186	74,103
(England) Daniel Gavins	23	9	16	178	91,221
(Scotland) Marc Warren	21	7	T24	215	45,232
(Italy) Filippo Bergamaschi	22	6	T14	209	61,132
(Norway) Kristian Krogh Johannessen	19	6	T31	214	46,816
(Chile) Hugo León	22	14	T5	116	270,012
(Republic of Ireland) Gavin Moynihan	23	10	T5	144	177,085
(Germany) Max Schmitt	24	11	T4	129	250,791
(Spain) David Borda	20	3	T23	230	32,400
(Norway) Kristoffer Reitan	25	10	T5	141	181,207
(England) Ben Evans	25	12	T5	142	179,007

T = Tied
Player retained his European Tour card for 2020 (finished inside the top 115)
Player did not retain his European Tour card for 2020, but retained conditional status (finished between 116 and 155, inclusive)
Player did not retain his European Tour card for 2020 (finished outside the top 155)

=== 2019 European Tour winners ===
No.	Date	Player	Tournament	Winning score	Margin of victory	Runner(s)-up
1	2 Dec 2018	(United States) Kurt Kitayama	AfrAsia Bank Mauritius Open	−20 (65-65-70-68=268)	2 strokes	(India) S. Chikkarangappa (France) Matthieu Pavon
2	3 Mar	(United States) Kurt Kitayama (2)	Oman Open	−7 (66-74-71-70=281)	1 stroke	(Spain) Jorge Campillo (Germany) Maximilian Kieffer (France) Clément Sordet (Paraguay) Fabrizio Zanotti
3	17 Mar	(Italy) Guido Migliozzi	Magical Kenya Open	−16 (67-68-64-69=268)	1 stroke	(Spain) Adri Arnaus (South Africa) Louis de Jager (South Africa) Justin Harding
4	2 Jun	(Italy) Guido Migliozzi (2)	Belgian Knockout	−3	4 strokes	(Netherlands) Darius van Driel

=== 2019 European Tour runner-up finishes ===
No.	Date	Player	Tournament	Winner	Winning score	Runner-up score
1	9 Dec 2018	(France) Romain Langasque	South African Open	(South Africa) Louis Oosthuizen	−18 (62-70-67-67=266)	−12 (69-68-69-66=272)
2	3 Mar	(France) Clément Sordet	Oman Open	(United States) Kurt Kitayama	−7 (66-74-71-70=281)	−6 (71-71-70-70=282)
3	10 Mar	(Sweden) Anton Karlsson	Commercial Bank Qatar Masters	(South Africa) Justin Harding	−13 (68-68-73-66=275)	−11 (72-66-70-69=277)
4	17 Mar	(South Africa) Louis de Jager	Magical Kenya Open	(Italy) Guido Migliozzi	−16 (67-68-64-69=268)	−15 (64-66-70-69=269)
5	31 Mar	(Japan) Masahiro Kawamura	Hero Indian Open	(Scotland) Stephen Gallacher	−9 (67-74-67-71=279)	−8 (69-70-68-73=280)
6	8 Sep	(Germany) Bernd Ritthammer	Porsche European Open	(England) Paul Casey	−14 (66-73-69-66=274)	−13 (71-66-70-68=275)
7	11 Nov	(United States) Kurt Kitayama (Note: Lost in a playoff)	Turkish Airlines Open	(England) Tyrrell Hatton	−20 (68-68-65-67=268)	−20 (69-68-67-64=268)

== See also ==
- 2018 Challenge Tour graduates
