= 2021 Challenge Tour graduates =

This is a list of players who graduated from the Challenge Tour in 2021. The top 20 players on the Challenge Tour rankings in 2021 earned European Tour cards for 2022.

	2021 Challenge Tour		2022 European Tour				
Player	Points rank	Points	Starts	Cuts made	Best finish	Points rank	Points
(Denmark) Marcus Helligkilde*	1	222,628	24	15	T4	98	551
(Portugal) Ricardo Gouveia	2	188,291	28	14	T7	122	437
(Spain) Santiago Tarrío*	3	173,938	30	18	T4	88	579
(France) Julien Brun*	4	163,773	27	20	T8	80	624
(France) Frédéric Lacroix*	5	120,334	27	16	T5	121	438
(Spain) Alfredo García-Heredia	6	112,328	27	15	T6	119	444
(South Africa) Oliver Bekker^{†}	7	108,730	28	19	2nd	36	1,230
(Scotland) Ewen Ferguson^{†}	8	102,943	28	17	Win (x2)	17	1,799
(Germany) Yannik Paul*	9	100,262	27	23	Win	20	1,527
(Austria) Lukas Nemecz	10	97,060	27	20	T3	84	612
(Germany) Marcel Schneider	11	96,973	27	15	4th	50	1,016
(Norway) Espen Kofstad	12	95,351	29	18	T9	113	490
(United States) Chase Hanna*	13	90,407	29	9	2nd	77	658
(Chile) Hugo León	14	88,883	30	11	T27	188	145
(Germany) Marcel Siem	15	87,123	25	14	T9	132	376
(Denmark) Niklas Nørgaard*	16	81,285	26	17	T7	110	509
(Germany) Hurly Long^{†}	17	78,646	27	21	T2	27	1,350
(England) Andrew Wilson*	18	78,220	28	9	7th	134	348
(Scotland) Craig Howie^{†}	19	77,542	26	13	T12	135	348
(Netherlands) Daan Huizing	20	75,113	29	15	T3	111	503

* European Tour rookie in 2022
^{†} First-time full member, but ineligible for Rookie of the Year award
T = Tied
The player retained his European Tour card for 2023 (finished inside the top 117).
The player did not retain his European Tour card for 2023, but retained conditional status (finished between 118 and 155, inclusive).
The player did not retain his European Tour card for 2023 (finished outside the top 155).

== Wins on the European Tour in 2022 ==
No.	Date	Player	Tournament	Winning score	Margin of victory	Runners-up
1	27 Mar	(Scotland) Ewen Ferguson	Commercial Bank Qatar Masters	−7 (67-71-73-70=281)	1 stroke	(United States) Chase Hanna
2	14 Aug	(Scotland) Ewen Ferguson (2)	ISPS Handa World Invitational	−12 (61-70-68-69=268)	3 strokes	(Scotland) Connor Syme (Spain) Borja Virto
3	23 Oct	(Germany) Yannik Paul	Mallorca Golf Open	−15 (71-64-62-72=269)	1 stroke	(Germany) Nicolai von Dellingshausen (England) Paul Waring

== Runner-up finishes on the European Tour in 2022 ==
No.	Date	Player	Tournament	Winner	Winning score	Runner-up score
1	5 Mar	(Germany) Hurly Long	Magical Kenya Open	(China) Wu Ashun	−16 (69-68-66-65=268)	−12 (68-68-70-66=272)
2	26 Mar	(United States) Chase Hanna	Commercial Bank Qatar Masters	(Scotland) Ewen Ferguson	−7 (67-71-73-70=281)	−6 (70-66-75-71=282)
3	30 Apr	(South Africa) Oliver Bekker (lost in playoff)	Catalunya Championship	(Spain) Adri Arnaus	−11 (68-76-68-65=277)	−11 (66-72-67-72=277)
4	14 May	(Germany) Yannik Paul	Soudal Open	(England) Sam Horsfield	−13 (65-69-69-68=271)	−11 (66-70-68-69=273)
5	4 Sep	(Scotland) Ewen Ferguson	Made in HimmerLand	(England) Oliver Wilson	−21 (66-65-65-67=263)	−20 (63-67-68-66=264)
