= 2017 PGA EuroPro Tour =

Golf tour season

2017 PGA EuroPro Tour season
- Duration: 26 April 2017 – 26 October 2017
- Number of official events: 16
- Most wins: (England) Chris Lloyd (3)
- Order of Merit: (England) Chris Lloyd

The 2017 PGA EuroPro Tour, titled as the 2017 HotelPlanner.com PGA EuroPro Tour for sponsorship reasons, was the 16th season of the PGA EuroPro Tour, a third-tier tour recognised by the European Tour.

== Schedule ==
The following table lists official events during the 2017 season.

Date	Tournament	Location	Purse (£)	Winner (Note: The number in brackets after each winner's name is the number of PGA EuroPro Tour events they had won up to and including that tournament. It is rare for someone to accumulate many wins on the PGA EuroPro Tour as success at this level usually leads to promotion to the Challenge Tour.)	OWGR points
28 Apr	Lookers Championship	Tyne and Wear	49,460	(Republic of Ireland) Gavin Moynihan (1)	4
12 May	Great National Hotels Irish Masters	Ireland	48,455	(England) Sam Robertshawe (1)	4
19 May	IFX Championship	Oxfordshire	47,605	(England) Hugo Dobson (1)	4
15 Jun	Eagle Orchid Scottish Masters	Angus	47,030	(England) Chris Lloyd (1)	4
23 Jun	PDC Golf Championship	Oxfordshire	49,210	(England) Chris Lloyd (2)	4
30 Jun	Grenke Championship	Wiltshire	47,030	(England) Neil Raymond (1)	4
7 Jul	Dawson and Sanderson Classic	Northumberland	49,945	(England) Nick Marsh (1)	4
21 Jul	Cobra Puma Golf Championship	Carmarthenshire	47,030	(Northern Ireland) Jonathan Caldwell (2)	4
28 Jul	Matchroom Sport Championship	Bedfordshire	47,030	(England) Sam Connor (3)	4
4 Aug	Nokia Masters	West Sussex	49,210	(England) Chris Lloyd (3)	4
11 Aug	Motocaddy Masters	Cheshire	51,070	(England) James Adams (1)	4
18 Aug	Pentahotels Championship	Berkshire	48,695	(South Korea) Kim Min-kyu (1)	4
25 Aug	FORE Business Championship	East Sussex	46,735	(South Korea) Kim Min-kyu (2)	4
1 Sep	Jessie May World Snooker Golf Championship	Northamptonshire	46,735	(England) Alex Belt (2)	4
15 Sep	Clipper Logistics Championship	West Yorkshire	47,605	(England) James Adams (2)	4
26 Oct	Sky Sports Tour Championship	Portugal	97,980	(England) Adam Chapman (1)	4

== Order of Merit ==
The Order of Merit was titled as the Race to Amendoeira and was based on prize money won during the season, calculated in Pound sterling. The top five players on the Order of Merit (not otherwise exempt) earned status to play on the 2018 Challenge Tour.

Position	Player	Prize money (£)	Status earned
1	(England) Chris Lloyd	37,695	Qualified for Challenge Tour (made cut in Q School)
2	(South Korea) Kim Min-kyu	37,150	Promoted to Challenge Tour
3	(England) Adam Chapman	26,586	Promoted to Challenge Tour
4	(England) Nick Marsh	24,045	Promoted to Challenge Tour
5	(Northern Ireland) Jonathan Caldwell	22,562	Promoted to Challenge Tour
6	(England) James Adams	21,185	Promoted to Challenge Tour
7	(England) Neil Raymond	20,318	
8	(Northern Ireland) Dermot McElroy	20,023	
9	(England) Jonathan Thomson	19,095	Qualified for European Tour (Top 25 in Q School)
10	(England) Sam Robertshawe	17,804	
