= Jeff Winther =

Danish professional golfer (born 1988)

Personal information
- Nationality: Denmark
- Born: 30 March 1988 (age 38) Gladsaxe, Denmark
- Height: 1.94 m (6 ft 4 in)

Career
- Sport: Golf
- Turned professional: 2012
- Current tour: European Tour
- Former tours: Challenge Tour; Nordic Golf League
- Professional wins: 5

Number of wins by tour
- European Tour: 2
- Other: 3

Achievements and awards
- Danish Golf Tour Order of Merit winner: 2013

Jeff Winther (born 30 March 1988) is a Danish professional golfer. He joined the European Tour in 2016 and won the 2021 Mallorca Golf Open and the 2026 Danish Golf Championship.

== Career ==
Winther turned professional in 2012 and won on his fifth appearance as a professional, playing in the 2012 Nordic Golf League. Two further victories the following year helped him finish third in the Order of Merit and earn promotion to the Challenge Tour.

On the 2015 Challenge Tour, Winther finished third at the D+D Real Slovakia Challenge, Aegean Airlines Challenge Tour and the NBO Golf Classic Grand Final, to end the season in 11th place on the Order of Merit, earning promotion to the European Tour.

On the 2016 European Tour, he finished runner-up at the Tshwane Open in South Africa to climb into the top 250 on the Official World Golf Ranking, but only kept his card through Qualifying School in 2016, 2017 and 2018.

In 2019, Winther finished fourth at the Mutuactivos Open de España and 91st in the 2019 Race to Dubai to keep his card. At the 2020 Commercial Bank Qatar Masters, he was clear at the top midway through the last round and was on track for his first European Tour victory, when he bogeyed the 12th, 16th and 17th holes to drop into a tie for third, one stroke shy of joining the playoff between Jorge Campillo and David Drysdale. He finished the season ranked 96th in the Race to Dubai.

In October 2021, Winther won his first European Tour event at the Mallorca Golf Open. He shot 62 twice on the way to a one-shot victory.

== Professional wins (5) ==
=== European Tour wins (2) ===
No.	Date	Tournament	Winning score	Margin of victory	Runners-up
1	24 Oct 2021	Mallorca Golf Open	−15 (62-71-62-70=265)	1 stroke	(Spain) Pep Anglès, (Spain) Jorge Campillo, (Sweden) Sebastian Söderberg
2	16 Aug 2026	Danish Golf Championship	−15 (71-67-68-67=273)	3 strokes	(Italy) Filippo Celli, (Denmark) Rasmus Højgaard, (England) Matthew Jordan, (Finland) Oliver Lindell, (China) Zhou Yanhan

=== Nordic Golf League wins (3) ===
No.	Date	Tournament	Winning score	Margin of victory	Runner(s)-up
1	4 May 2012	Sydbank Masters	−8 (74-68-66=208)	Playoff	(Denmark) Lucas Bjerregaard
2	1 Jun 2013	Bravo Tours Open	−19 (65-67-65=197)	1 stroke	(Denmark) Kristian Grud, (Sweden) Alexander Jacobsson
3	17 Aug 2013	ECCO Tournament of Champions	−4 (74-71-68-71=284)	1 stroke	(Sweden) Steven Jeppesen

== See also ==
- 2015 Challenge Tour graduates
- 2016 European Tour Qualifying School graduates
- 2017 European Tour Qualifying School graduates
- 2018 European Tour Qualifying School graduates
