= 2017 European Tour Qualifying School graduates =

This is a list of the 33 players who earned 2018 European Tour cards through Q School in 2017.

Place	Player	European Tour starts	Cuts made	Notes
1	(England) Sam Horsfield	5	2	
T2	(South Africa) Jacques Kruyswijk	12	5	1 Sunshine Tour win
T2	(Sweden) Pontus Widegren	31	13	
T2	(Italy) Andrea Pavan	89	37	4 Challenge Tour wins
T2	(Denmark) Anders Hansen	433	312	3 European Tour wins
T2	(England) Charlie Ford	18	10	1 Challenge Tour win
T2	(Denmark) Jeff Winther	43	18	
8	(Sweden) Kristoffer Broberg	130	70	1 European Tour win
T9	(New Zealand) Josh Geary	20	6	1 PGA Tour of Australasia win
T9	(England) Mark Foster	433	249	1 European Tour win
T9	(Scotland) Connor Syme	5	3	
T12	(Spain) Pep Anglès	29	14	
T12	(Spain) Gonzalo Fernández-Castaño	231	173	7 European Tour wins
T12	(England) Laurie Canter	39	20	
T15	(France) Sébastien Gros	55	24	2 Challenge Tour wins
T15	(England) Ross McGowan	160	83	1 European Tour win
T15	(Chile) Nico Geyger	5	1	
T18	(Italy) Lorenzo Gagli	113	61	
T18	(Germany) Sebastian Heisele	25	11	
T18	(England) James Heath	83	37	2 Challenge Tour wins
T18	(Austria) Matthias Schwab	6	5	
T18	(Sweden) Henric Sturehed	0	0	
T18	(England) Jonathan Thomson	2	2	
T18	(England) Matthew Baldwin	133	67	1 Challenge Tour win
T25	(England) Ben Evans	87	44	
T25	(South Africa) Justin Walters	158	73	2 Sunshine Tour wins
T25	(Germany) Marcel Schneider	15	6	
T25	(South Africa) Christiaan Bezuidenhout	14	8	1 Sunshine Tour win
T25	(Chile) Felipe Aguilar	279	162	2 European Tour wins
T25	(England) Matthew Nixon	143	69	
T25	(Republic of Ireland) Gavin Moynihan	7	3	
T25	(Thailand) Jazz Janewattananond	24	16	1 Asian Tour win
T25	(Sweden) Christofer Blomstrand	8	4	1 Sunshine Tour win

2018 European Tour rookie
First-time member ineligible for Rookie of the Year award

== 2018 Results ==
Player	Starts	Cuts made	Best finish	Money list rank	Earnings (€)
(England) Sam Horsfield*	29	17	2	52	883,067
(South Africa) Jacques Kruyswijk*	25	15	T4	100	391,933
(Sweden) Pontus Widegren	22	6	T9	215	47,265
(Italy) Andrea Pavan	29	23	Win	34	1,341,441
(Denmark) Anders Hansen	9	4	T29	228	32,637
(England) Charlie Ford*	24	12	T8	161	170,659
(Denmark) Jeff Winther	25	14	T9	137	241,224
(Sweden) Kristoffer Broberg	1	1	T32	n/a	22,312
(New Zealand) Josh Geary^{†}	22	9	T10	176	120,270
(England) Mark Foster	18	5	T12	191	86,386
(Scotland) Connor Syme*	26	11	2	126	287,655
(Spain) Pep Anglès	22	11	T12	168	157,961
(Spain) Gonzalo Fernández-Castaño	15	8	T4	104	367,992
(England) Laurie Canter	25	12	T16x2	154	192,522
(France) Sébastien Gros	25	11	T4	143	229,417
(England) Ross McGowan	14	4	T13	209	53,740
(Chile) Nico Geyger*	16	6	T12	180	104,544
(Italy) Lorenzo Gagli	19	9	T14	150	207,708
(Germany) Sebastian Heisele	20	9	T8	187	91,643
(England) James Heath	12	4	4	189	88,761
(Austria) Matthias Schwab*	26	18	T4	72	619,606
(Sweden) Henric Sturehed*	21	7	T5	153	203,357
(England) Jonathan Thomson*	21	11	T2	147	209,595
(England) Matthew Baldwin	24	11	9	164	165,736
(England) Ben Evans	13	0	CUT	n/a	0
(South Africa) Justin Walters	23	17	T3	113	324,619
(Germany) Marcel Schneider^{†}	13	5	T46	255	22,202
(South Africa) Christiaan Bezuidenhout*	26	20	T17	105	366,454
(Chile) Felipe Aguilar	21	9	T4	165	165,402
(England) Matthew Nixon	22	13	T8	123	305,253
(Republic of Ireland) Gavin Moynihan*	13	1	T8	212	52,235
(Thailand) Jazz Janewattananond^{†}	16	7	T6	175	124,205
(Sweden) Christofer Blomstrand*	22	5	T2	131	261,109

* European Tour rookie in 2018
^{†} First-time member ineligible for Rookie of the Year award
T = Tied
The player retained his European Tour card for 2019 (finished inside the top 115).
The player did not retain his European Tour card for 2019, but retained conditional status (finished between 115 and 155, inclusive).
The player did not retain his European Tour card for 2019 (finished outside the top 155).

== Winners on the European Tour in 2018 ==
No.	Date	Player	Tournament	Winning score	Margin of victory	Runner-up
1	26 Aug	(Italy) Andrea Pavan	D+D Real Czech Masters	−22 (65-69-65-67=266)	2 strokes	(Republic of Ireland) Pádraig Harrington

== Runners-up on the European Tour in 2018 ==
No.	Date	Player	Tournament	Winner	Winning score	Runner-up score
1	4 Mar	(England) Sam Horsfield	Tshwane Open	(South Africa) George Coetzee	−18 (67-64-68-67=266)	−16 (68-69-64-67=268)
2	10 Jun	(Scotland) Connor Syme	Shot Clock Masters	(Finland) Mikko Korhonen	−16 (68-67-68-69=272)	−10 (68-72-69-69=278)
3	29 Jul	(Sweden) Christofer Blomstrand	Porsche European Open	(England) Richard McEvoy	−11 (70-65-69-73=277)	−10 (72-67-71-68=278)
4	2 Sep	(England) Jonathan Thomson lost in four-man playoff	Made in Denmark	(England) Matt Wallace	−19 (68-68-66-67=269)	−19 (64-69-68-68=269)

== See also ==
- 2017 Challenge Tour graduates
- 2018 European Tour
