= Deyen Lawson =

Australian professional golfer

Personal information
- Full name: Deyen Mitchell Lawson
- Nickname: Digger
- Nationality: Australia
- Born: 7 January 1991 (age 35) Geelong, Victoria, Australia
- Height: 1.87 m (6 ft 2 in)
- Spouse: Ali Orchard (m. 2022)

Career
- Sport: Golf
- Turned professional: 2016
- Current tours: PGA Tour of Australasia; Asian Development Tour
- Former tours: European Tour; Asian Tour; PGA Tour China; China Tour
- Professional wins: 2

Number of wins by tour
- PGA Tour of Australasia: 1
- Other: 1

Best results in major championships
- Masters Tournament: DNP
- PGA Championship: DNP
- U.S. Open: DNP
- The Open Championship: CUT: 2021

Deyen Mitchell "Digger" Lawson (born 4 January 1991) is an Australian professional golfer who plays on the PGA Tour of Australasia and the Asian Tour.

== Early golf career ==
Lawson started playing golf at the age of 10. In 2017, he completed a golf professional trainee-ship at Curlewis Golf Club in Geelong, Australia.

== Professional career ==
Lawson earned a place on the PGA Tour of Australasia in 2016. In 2017 he was runner-up in the Northern Territory PGA Championship, and in early 2018 he was a runner-up in the NZ PGA Championship. In late 2018, he attended the European Tour Qualifying Tour school for the second time. He finished tied for 13th at the final stage, gaining a full time playing card for 2019 season.

In the first half of his debut season on the European Tour, Lawson had the unusual achievement of two holes-in-one. The first happened at Alfred Dunhill Championship in December 2018. For his effort, Lawson won a BMW 8 Series worth around A$250,000. He scored his second ace at the Commercial Bank Qatar Masters in March 2019. Both aces Lawson used an eight iron.

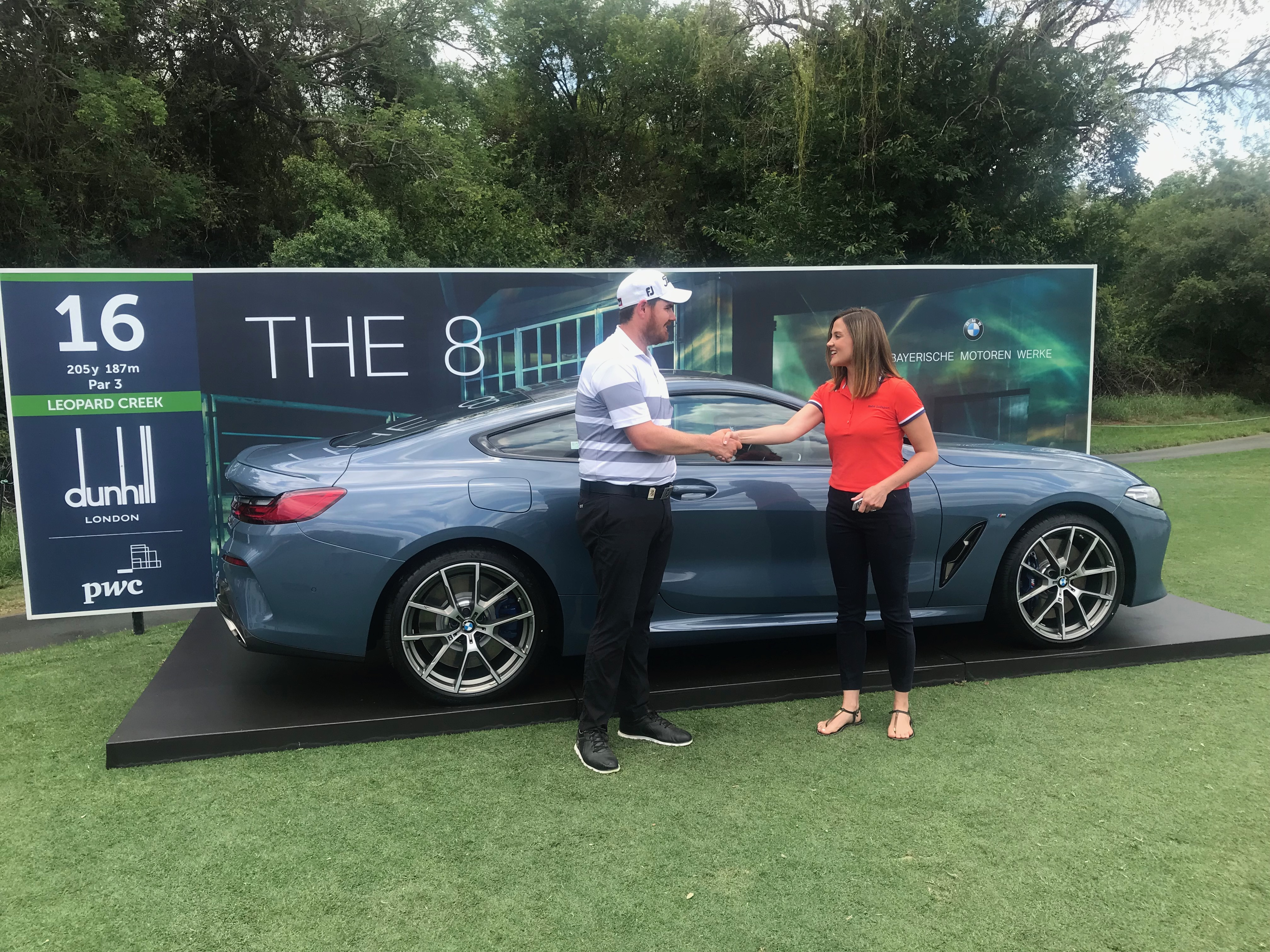
Deyen Lawson wins BMW 850i at 2018 Alfred Dunhill Championship

Lawson finished 187th on the European Tour Race to Dubai rankings for 2019. He returned to European Tour Q school and gained limited playing membership rights (exemption category 22) for the 2020 season by making the cut at the final stage.

Lawson finished 17th on the PGA Tour of Australasia 2019 Order of Merit from just six starts. This included two top-10 finishes; tied runner-up at the Queensland PGA Championship and tied for 10th place at the Australian Open.

In 2023, Lawson competed on the Asian Development Tour, finishing 2nd in the order of merit to earn status to play on the 2024 Asian Tour. This has enabled him to have full playing rights for 2024 season.

== Professional wins (2) ==
=== PGA Tour of Australasia wins (1) ===
No.	Date	Tournament	Winning score	Margin of victory	Runner-up
1	23 Oct 2022	Nexus Advisernet WA Open	−20 (62-63-64-71=260)	2 strokes	(Australia) Michael Sim

=== Asian Development Tour wins (1) ===
No.	Date	Tournament	Winning score	Margin of victory	Runner-up
1	13 Oct 2023	Indo Masters Golf Invitational	−13 (71-67-65=260)	Playoff	(Thailand) Charng-Tai Sudsom

== Results in major championships ==
Tournament	2021
Masters Tournament	
PGA Championship	
U.S. Open	
The Open Championship	CUT

Did not play

CUT = missed the half-way cut

== See also ==
- 2018 European Tour Qualifying School graduates
