= Ewen Ferguson =

Scottish professional golfer

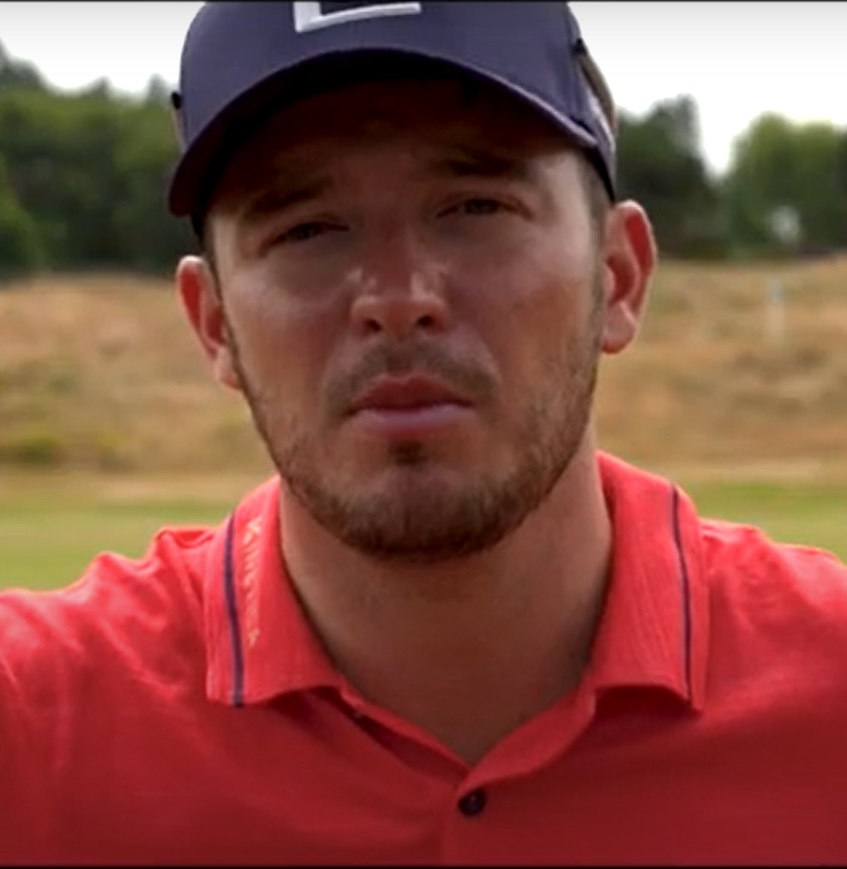
- Ferguson in 2023

Personal information
- Full name: Ewen Mackenzie Stewart Ferguson
- Nickname: Ewbo
- Nationality: Scotland
- Born: 6 July 1996 (age 30) Glasgow, Scotland
- Height: 5 ft 11 in (180 cm)

Career
- Sport: Golf
- Turned professional: 2016
- Current tour: European Tour
- Former tour: Challenge Tour
- Professional wins: 3
- Highest ranking: 99 (21 July 2024) (as of 25 October 2026)

Number of wins by tour
- European Tour: 3

Best results in major championships
- Masters Tournament: DNP
- PGA Championship: DNP
- U.S. Open: DNP
- The Open Championship: T22: 2024

Ewen Mackenzie Stewart Ferguson (born 6 July 1996) is a Scottish professional golfer.

== Amateur career ==
During his amateur career, Ferguson won the Boys Amateur Championship in 2013, and is the only player to hold the British Boys title and both the Scottish Boys Matchplay and Strokeplay titles simultaneously. Ferguson was a member of the 2015 Walker Cup Great Britain and Ireland team. In August 2016, he reached the quarter-finals of The Amateur Championship.

== Professional career ==
Ferguson turned professional in August 2016.

In November 2017, Ferguson made the final stage of the European Tour Qualifying School and finished in 76th place.

He then competed full-time on the Challenge Tour in 2018 and 2019, with a best finish of runner-up at the Euram Bank Open in 2019 and finished 25th in the 2019 Challenge Tour Rankings. In 2019 he had a best finish on the European Tour; third place in the Belgian Knockout.

Returning to the Challenge Tour in 2021 he was a runner-up three times and had three other top-10 finishes, he finished 8th in the Road to Mallorca Challenge Tour rankings, securing his full European Tour card for the first time.

In March 2022, in only his 37th start, Ferguson claimed his first European Tour victory at the Commercial Bank Qatar Masters. Ferguson won his second European Tour event in August 2022 at the ISPS Handa World Invitational. He shot an opening-round 61 to eventually win wire-to-wire. A month later, he finished second at the Made in HimmerLand in Denmark; one shot behind Oliver Wilson.

In July 2024, Ferguson won his third European Tour event at the BMW International Open.

== Amateur wins ==
- 2012 Challenge at Fleming Island, Munster Boys Amateur
- 2013 Stephen Gallagher Foundation Trophy, Boys Amateur Championship
- 2014 Scottish Boys Championship, Scottish Boys Strokeplay
- 2015 Scottish Champion of Champions, Craigmillar Park Open

== Professional wins (3) ==
=== European Tour wins (3) ===
No.	Date	Tournament	Winning score	Margin of victory	Runner(s)-up
1	27 Mar 2022	Commercial Bank Qatar Masters	−7 (67-71-73-70=281)	1 stroke	(United States) Chase Hanna
2	14 Aug 2022	ISPS Handa World Invitational	−12 (61-70-68-69=268)	3 strokes	(Scotland) Connor Syme, (Spain) Borja Virto
3	7 Jul 2024	BMW International Open	−18 (67-64-71-68=270)	2 strokes	(Australia) David Micheluzzi, (England) Jordan Smith

European Tour playoff record (0–1)

No.	Year	Tournament	Opponents	Result
1	2025	Soudal Open	(Norway) Kristoffer Reitan, (Netherlands) Darius van Driel	Reitan won with birdie on second extra hole

== Playoff record ==
Challenge Tour playoff record (0–1)

No.	Year	Tournament	Opponent	Result
1	2021	Sydbank Esbjerg Challenge	(Norway) Espen Kofstad	Lost to birdie on first extra hole

== Results in major championships ==
Tournament	2023	2024
Masters Tournament		
PGA Championship		
U.S. Open		
The Open Championship	CUT	T22

Did not play

CUT = missed the half-way cut
"T" = tied

== Team appearances ==
Amateur

- Boys Home Internationals (representing Scotland): 2012, 2013, 2014
- European Boys' Team Championship (representing Scotland): 2013, 2014
- Jacques Léglise Trophy (representing Great Britain & Ireland): 2013 (winners), 2014 (captain, winners)
- European Amateur Team Championship (representing Scotland): 2015 (winners)
- Walker Cup (representing Great Britain & Ireland): 2015 (winners)

Professional

- Hero Cup (representing Great Britain & Ireland): 2023

== See also ==
- 2021 Challenge Tour graduates
