= Golf at the 2011 Arab Games =

Coordinates: 25°23′2.70″N 51°30′26.27″E

Golf at the 2011 Pan Arab Games
- Venue: Doha Golf Club
- Location: Doha, Qatar
- Dates: 11–16 December

At the 2011 Pan Arab Games, the golf events were held at Doha Golf Club in Doha, Qatar from 11–16 December. A total of 4 events were contested.

== Medal summary ==
=== Men ===
Event	Gold	Silver	Bronze
Individual	Ahmed Al Musharekh (UAE)	Hamad Farhan (BHR)	Ali Abdulla Al-Bishi (QAT)
Team	United Arab Emirates (UAE); Khalid Al Jasmi; Faris Al Mazrui; Abdalla Al Musharekh; Ahmed Al Musharekh	Egypt (EGY); Amr Abouelela; Issa Abouelela; Mamdouh El Sheikh; Soliman Elaasser	Bahrain (BHR); Mohamed Al Noaimi; Hamad Farhan; Abdulla Mubarak; Sultan Mubarak

=== Women ===
Event	Gold	Silver	Bronze
Individual	Feriel Chahed (TUN)	Nezha Haddioui (MAR)	Houria El Abbadi (MAR)
Team	Morocco (MAR); Houria El Abbadi; Nadia Ettabaa; Nezha Haddioui	Tunisia (TUN); Feriel Chahed; Sabrine Essahli; Ghozlene Saki	Lebanon (LIB); Rima Arab; Danielle Khalife; Catherine Schoucair Soubra

== Medal table ==
* Host nation (Qatar)

Rank	Nation	Gold	Silver	Bronze	Total
1	United Arab Emirates	2	0	0	2
2	Morocco	1	1	1	3
3	Tunisia	1	1	0	2
4	Bahrain	0	1	1	2
5	Egypt	0	1	0	1
6	Lebanon	0	0	1	1
6	Qatar*	0	0	1	1
Totals (7 entries)		4	4	4	12
