= Mallorca Ladies Open =

Professional golf tournament

Coordinates: 39.588°N 2.606°E

Tournament information
- Location: Palma de Mallorca, Spain
- Established: 2023
- Course: Golf Son Muntaner
- Par: 72
- Length: 5,616 m (6,142 yd)
- Tour: Ladies European Tour
- Format: Stroke play
- Prize fund: €400,000
- Month played: November

Current champion
- (Germany) Alexandra Försterling

Final champion
- Location in Spain Location in the Balearic Islands Location in Mallorca

The Mallorca Ladies Open is a professional golf tournament on the Ladies European Tour, first played in 2023.

The tournament is held at Golf Son Muntaner in Palma de Mallorca, host to the Mallorca Golf Open on the European Tour in 2021 and 2022. The inaugural tournament was won by Alexandra Försterling.

== Winners ==
Year	Winner	Country	Score	To par	Margin of victory	Runner-up	Winner's share (€)
2023	Alexandra Försterling	Germany	69-67-67=203	–13	5 strokes	(Thailand) Trichat Cheenglab	60,000
