= 2013 European Amateur Team Championship =

Golf competition

Tournament information
- Dates: 9–13 July 2013
- Location: Silkeborg, Denmark; 56°10′30″N 9°38′00″E
- Course: Silkeborg Ry Golf Club
- Organized by: European Golf Association
- Format: Qualification round: 36 holes stroke play Knock-out match-play

Statistics
- Par: 72
- Length: 7,016 yards (6,415 m)
- Field: 16 teams 96 players

Champion
- England; Nathan Kimsey, Max Orrin, Garrick Porteous, Neil Raymond, Callum Shinkwin, Toby Tree
- Qualification round: 743 (+23); Final match: 4 1/2–2 1/2
- Location in Europe Location i Denmark

The 2013 European Amateur Team Championship took place 9–13 July at Silkeborg Ry Golf Club in Silkeborg, located in the middle of the Jutlandic peninsula, Denmark. It was the 30th men's golf European Amateur Team Championship.

== Venue ==
The club was founded as Silkeborg Golf Club in 1965 and its first 18-hole course was fully developed in 1968. In early 2013 the club merged with Ry Golf Club and under the new name Silkeborg Ry Golf Club expanded to 54 holes.

== Format ==
The number of entering nation teams was, for the first time limited to 16. A second division, named European Men's Challenge Trophy, took place 10–13 July 2013 in the Czech Republic, giving the participating teams the opportunity to qualify for next year's championship. Belgium and Iceland finished first and second and qualified for the 2014 European Amateur Team Championship. The year after, the Challenge Trophy was renamed The European Amateur Team Championship Division 2.

Each team consisted of 6 players, playing two rounds of stroke-play over two days, counting the five best scores each day for each team.

There was no official award for the lowest individual score, but individual leaders were Rory McNamara, Ireland and James Ross, Scotland, each with a 1-under-par score of 143, one stroke ahead of Mads Søgaard, Denmark.

The eight best teams formed flight A, in knock-out match-play over the next three days. The teams were seeded based on their positions after the stroke play. The first placed team was drawn to play the quarter final against the eight placed team, the second against the seventh, the third against the sixth and the fourth against the fifth. Teams were allowed to use six players during the team matches, selecting four of them in the two morning foursome games and five players in to the afternoon single games. Teams knocked out after the quarter finals played one foursome game and four single games in each of their remaining matches. Games all square at the 18th hole were declared halved, if the team match was already decided.

The eight teams placed 9–16 in the qualification stroke-play formed flight B, to play similar knock-out play, with one foursome game and four single games in each match, to decide their final positions.

== Teams ==
16 nation teams contested the event, four less than at the previous event two years earlier. Each team consisted of six players.

Players in the participating teams
Country	Players
Austria	Markus Habeler, Lukas Lipold, Tobias Nemecz, Mattias Schwab, Nikolaus Wimmer, Sebastian Wittmann
Denmark	Christian Gløët, Niklas Nørgaard, Mads Søgaard, Thomas Sørensen, Nicolai Tinning, Kasper Estrup
England	Nathan Kimsey, Max Orrin, Garrick Porteous, Neil Raymond, Callum Shinkwin, Toby Tree
Finland	Teemu Bakker, Albert Eckhardt, Toni Hakula, Kristian Kulokorpi, Erik Myllymäki, Lauri Ruuska
France	Paul Barjon, Julien Brun, Thomas Elissalde, Adrien Saddier, Clément Sordet, Joël Stalter
Germany	Dominic Foos, Martin Keskar, Alexander Matlari, Maximilian Mehles, Maximilian Röhrig, Max Rottluff
Ireland	Paul Dunne, Jack Hume, Rory McNamara, Gavin Moynihan, Kevin Phelan, Reeve Whitson
Italy	Filippo Campigli, Giulio Castagnara, Riccardo Michelini, Stefano Pitoni, Francesco Testa, Filippo Zuchetti
Netherlands	Max Albertus, Rowin Caron, Michael Kraay, Jeroen Krietemeijer, Lars van Meijel, Robbie van West
Norway	Lasse Gerhardsen, Petter Mikalsen, Sebastian Mørk-Andersen, Aksel Olsen, Ole Ramsnes, Sondre Ronold
Portugal	Joao Carlota, Goncalo Costa, Pedro Figueiredo, Ricardo Gouveia, José Maria Joia, Goncalo Pinto
Scotland	Scott Borrowman, Jack McDonald, Bradley Neil, Graeme Robertson, James Ross, Ewan Scott
Spain	Emilio Cuartero, Scott Fernandez, Toni Ferrer, Jon Rahm, Juan Francisco Sarasti, Borja Virto
Sweden	Niclas Carlsson, Daniel Jennevret, Sebastian Söderberg, Pontus Gad, Eric Oja, Victor Tärnström
Switzerland	Marc Dobias, Mathias Eggenberger, Benjamim Rusch, Edouard Amacher, Marco Iten, Philippe Schweizer
Wales	David Boote, Tim Harry, Richard James, Matthew Moseley, Rhys Pugh, Ben Westgate

== Winners ==
Leader of the opening 36-hole competition was team France, with a 15-over-par score of 735. Two-times champions Spain did not make it to the quarter finals, finishing 10th, despite future professional world number one, 18-year-old Jon Rahm, in the team, who finished tied fourth individually. Two-times-champions Sweden, finishing 13th in the qualifying round, did not make it to the quarter finals either.

Team England won the gold medal, earning their 11th title, beating neighbor nation Scotland in the final 4 1/2–2 1/2.

Team France, earned the bronze on third place, after beating the Netherlands 5–2 in the bronze match.

Norway and Wales, placed 14th and 16th, were moved to Division 2 for 2014. Finland, placed 15th, was qualified for the 2014 event as host nation.

== Results ==
Qualification round

Team standings

Place	Country	Score	To par
1	France	361-374=735	+15
2	Ireland	371-370=741	+21
T3	England *	375-368=743	+23
T3	Germany	368-375=743	+23
5	Scotland	371-373=744	+24
6	Denmark	382-370=752	+32
7	Netherlands	373-384=757	+37
T8	Austria *	380-378=758	+38
T8	Portugal	376-382=758	+38
T10	Spain *	386-373=759	+39
T10	Switzerland	384-375=759	+39
12	Wales	373-388=761	+41
13	Sweden	383-386=769	+49
14	Norway	382-388=770	+50
15	Finland	382-390=772	+52
16	Italy	387-389=776	+56

* Note: In the event of a tie the order was determined by the best total of the two non-counting scores of the two rounds.

Individual leaders

Place	Player	Country	Score	To par
T1	Rory McNamara	Ireland	70-73=143	−1
T1	James Ross	Scotland	72-71=143	−1
3	Mads Søgaard	Denmark	72-72=144	E
T4	Jon Rahm	Spain	74-71=145	+1
T4	Maximilian Röhrig	Germany	72-73=145	+1
T4	Adrien Saddier	France	70-75=145	+1
T7	Rowin Caron	Netherlands	72-74=146	+2
T7	Neil Raymond	England	76-70=146	+2
T7	Graeme Robertson	Scotland	72-74=146	+2
T7	Thomas Sørensen	Denmark	75-71=146	+2

Note: There was no official award for the lowest individual score.

Flight A

Bracket

Quarter finals
France	5.5
Austria	1.5
Scotland	4
Germany	3
England	5
Denmark	2
Netherlands	4
Ireland	3

Semi finals
Scotland	4.5
France	2.5
England	6
Netherlands	1

Final
England	4.5
Scotland	2.5
Bronze match
France	5
Netherlands	2

Elimination matches
Austria	4
Germany	1
Denmark	4.5
Ireland	0.5

Match for 5th place
Denmark	3.5
Austria	1.5
Match for 7th place
Ireland	4
Germany	1

Final games

England	Scotland
4.5	2.5
N. Raymond / G. Porteous 4 & 2	J. Ross / E. Scott
M. Orrin / N. Kimsey 4 & 2	G. Robertson / J. McDonald
Callum Shinkwin	Graeme Robertson 1 up
Garrick Porteous 3 & 2	Jack McDonald
Toby Tree	Bradley Neil 2 up
Nathan Kimsey AS *	Ewan Scott AS *
Max Orrin 19th hole	Scott Borrowman

* Note: Game declared halved, since team match already decided.

Flight B

Bracket

Round 1
Italy	5
Portugal	0
Sweden	5
Wales	0
Switzerland	4.5
Norway	0.5
Spain	4
Finland	1

Round 2
Sweden	3
Italy	2
Spain	3.5
Switzerland	1.5

Match for 9th place
Spain	4
Sweden	1
Match for 11th place
Italy	4
Switzerland	1

Elimination matches
Portugal	3.5
Wales	1.5
Norway	3
Finland	2

Match for 13th place
Portugal	3.5
Norway	1.5
Match for 15th place
Finland	3
Wales	2

Final standings

Place	Country
1st place, gold medalist(s)	England
2nd place, silver medalist(s)	Scotland
3rd place, bronze medalist(s)	France
4	Netherlands
5	Denmark
6	Austria
7	Ireland
8	Germany
9	Spain
10	Sweden
11	Italy
12	Switzerland
13	Portugal
14	Norway
15	Finland
16	Wales

== See also ==
- Eisenhower Trophy – biennial world amateur team golf championship for men organized by the International Golf Federation.
- European Ladies' Team Championship – European amateur team golf championship for women organised by the European Golf Association.
