= 2014 European Amateur Team Championship =

Golf competition

Tournament information
- Dates: 8–12 July 2014
- Location: Hämeenlinna, Finland; 60°59′40″N 24°28′00″E
- Course: Linna Golf Oy
- Organized by: European Golf Association
- Format: Qualification round: 36 holes stroke play Knock-out match-play

Statistics
- Par: 72
- Length: 7,244 yards (6,624 m)
- Field: 16 teams 96 players

Champion
- Spain; Pep Anglès, Daniel Berná, Emilio Cuartero, Mario Galiano, Scott Fernández, Jon Rahm
- Qualification round: 703 (−17); Final match: 5–2
- Location in Europe Location i Finland

The 2014 European Amateur Team Championship took place 8–12 July at Linna Golf Oy in Hämeenlinna, Finland. It was the 31st men's golf European Amateur Team Championship.

== Venue ==
The course, situated 5 kilometres east of Hämeenlinna, located in the historical province of Tavastia and the modern province of Kanta-Häme in the south of Finland, 98 kilometres north of Helsinki, was designed by Tim Lobb in cooperation with European Tour Design and opened in 2005.

== Format ==
Each team consisted of 6 players, playing two rounds of stroke-play over two days, counting the five best scores each day for each team. The eight best teams formed flight A, in knock-out match-play over the next three days. The teams were seeded based on their positions after the stroke play. The first placed team was drawn to play the quarter-final against the eight placed team, the second against the seventh, the third against the sixth and the fourth against the fifth. Teams were allowed to use six players during the team matches, selecting four of them in the two morning foursome games and five players in to the afternoon single games. Teams knocked out after the quarter-finals played one foursome game and four single games in each of their remaining matches. Games all square at the 18th hole were declared halved, if the team match was already decided.

The eight teams placed 9–16 in the qualification stroke-play formed flight B, to play similar knock-out play, with one foursome game and four single games in each match, to decide their final positions.

== Teams ==
16 nation teams contested the event. Each team consisted of six players.

Players in the participating teams
Country	Players
Austria	Markus Habeler, Markus Maukner, Lukas Lipold, Sebastian Wittmann, Patrick Oswald, Robin Goger
Belgium	Thomas Detry, Samuel Echikson, Dédric Van Wassenhove, Kevin Hesbois, Maxence De Craecker, Gil Debusscher
Denmark	Niklas Nørgaard, John Axelsen, Victor Henum, Martin Leth Simonsen, Nicolai Tinning, Nicolai Kristensen
England	Ashley Chesters, Ryan Evans, Paul Howard, Toby Tree, Jordan Smith, Ben Stow
Finland	Linus Väisänen, Lauri Ruuska, Albert Eckhardt, Erik Myllimäki, Miki Kuronen, Kristian Kulokorpi
France	Paul Barjon, Léonard Bem, Julien Brun, Ugo Coussaud, Mathieu Fenasse, Clément Sordet
Germany	Maximillian Bögel, Hurly Long, Maximilian Mehles, Yannik Paul, Maximilian Röhrig, Maximilian Rottluff
Iceland	Gisli Sveinbergsson, Guðmundur Kristjánsson, Haraldur Franklin, Andri Björnsson, Bjarki Pétursson, Ragnar Gardarsson
Ireland	Paul Dunne, Jack Hume, Gary Hurley, Dermot McElroy, Gavin Moynihan, Cormac Sharvin
Italy	Jacopo Vecchi Fossa, Enrico Di Nitto, Riccardo Michelini, Federico Zuchetti, Paolo Ferraris, Filippo Campigli
Netherlands	Darius Van Driel, Robbie Van West, Jeroen Krietemeijer, Lars van Meijel, Michael Kraaij, Rowin Caron
Portugal	João Carlota, Tomás Silva, Vitor Lopes, João Magalhaes, Gonçalo Costa, João Girao
Scotland	Grant Forrest, Jack McDonald, Bradley Neil, Graeme Robertson, James Ross, Jamie Savage
Spain	Pep Anglès, Daniel Berná, Emilio Cuartero, Mario Galiano, Scott Fernández, Jon Rahm
Sweden	Oskar Bergqvist, Tobias Edén, Niklas Lindström, Hannes Rönneblad, Victor Tärnström, Axel Östensson
Switzerland	Edouard Amacher, Mathias Eggenberger, Joel Girbach, Marco Iten, Benjamin Rusch, Philippe Schweizer

== Winners ==
Leader of the opening 36-hole competition was team England with a 20-under-par score of 700, three strokes ahead of team Spain. Sweden, on third place, was another ten strokes behind.

There was no official award for the lowest individual score, but individual leader was Ryan Evans, England, with an 11-under-par score of 133, one stroke ahead of Hurly Long, Germany.

Team Spain won the gold medal, earning their third title, beating team Ireland in the final 4½–2½.

Team England, earned the bronze on third place, after beating neighbor nation Scotland 4½–2½ in the bronze match.

A second division, named European Amateur Championship Division 2, took place 9 – 12 July 2014 in the Czech Republic. The three best placed teams, Wales, Poland and the Czech Republic qualified for the 2015 European Amateur Team Championship.

Iceland, Portugal and Austria placed 14th, 15th and 16th in the 2014 championship and were moved to Division 2 for 2015.

== Results ==
Qualification round

Team standings

Place	Country	Score	To par
1	England	355-345=700	−20
2	Spain	347-356=703	−17
3	Sweden	357-350=707	−13
4	Ireland	355-354=709	−11
T5	Germany *	360-350=710	−10
T5	Scotland	356-354=710	−10
7	France	354-357=711	−9
8	Switzerland	355-360=715	−5
9	Italy	355-362=717	−3
10	Denmark	360-358=718	−2
11	Belgium	360-359=719	−1
12	Netherlands	358-363=721	+1
13	Finland	356-367=723	+3
14	Austria	366-369=735	+15
15	Iceland	375-361=736	+16
16	Portugal	383-363=746	+26

* Note: In the event of a tie the order was determined by the
best total of the two non-counting scores of the two rounds.

Individual leaders

Place	Player	Country	Score	To par
1	Ryan Evans	England	68-65=133	−11
2	Hurly Long	Germany	68-66=134	−10
3	Grant Forrest	Scotland	70-65=135	−9
T4	Thomas Detry	Belgium	67-69=136	−8
T4	Niklas Nørgaard	Denmark	66-70=136	−8
6	Mathieu Fenasse	France	66-71=137	−7
T7	Samuel Echison	Belgium	67-71=138	−6
T7	Gavin Moynihan	Ireland	71-67=138	−6
T9	Pep Anglès	Spain	72-67=139	−5
T9	Tobias Edén	Sweden	70-69=139	−5
T9	Axel Östensson	Sweden	70-69=139	−5

Note: There was no official award for the lowest individual score.

Flight A

Bracket

Quarter finals
England	6
Switzerland	1
Ireland	4
Germany	3
Scotland	4.5
Sweden	2.5
Spain	4
France	3

Semi finals
Ireland	5
England	2
Spain	5
Scotland	2

Final
Spain	5
Ireland	2
Bronze match
England	4.5
Scotland	2.5

Elimination matches
Germany	3
Switzerland	2
Sweden	3
France	2

Match for 5th place
Germany	3
Sweden	2
Match for 7th place
Switzerland	3
France	2

Final games

Spain	Ireland
5	2
M. Galiano / P. Angles 1 up	J. Hume / G. Monyhan
J. Rahm / S. Fernandez	P. Dunne / G. Hurley 1 up
Pep Anglés 6 & 4	Gavin Monyhan
Mario Galiano 4 & 3	Comac Sharvin
Jon Rahm 5 & 4	Dermot McElroy
Scott Fernandez AS *	Paul Dunne AS *
Emilio Cuartero AS *	Gary Hurley AS *

* Note: Game declared halved, since team match already decided.

Flight B

Bracket

Round 1
Italy	5
Portugal	0
Netherlands	3.5
Finland	1.5
Belgium	3
Austria	2
Denmark	4
Iceland	1

Round 2
Italy	3
Netherlands	2
Belgium	3
Denmark	2

Match for 9th place
Italy	3.5
Belgium	1.5
Match for 11th place
Denmark	3
Netherlands	2

Elimination matches
Finland	3
Portugal	2
Iceland	3.5
Austria	1.5

Match for 13th place
Finland	5
Iceland	0
Match for 15th place
Portugal	3.5
Austria	1.5

Final standings

Place	Country
1st place, gold medalist(s)	Spain
2nd place, silver medalist(s)	Ireland
3rd place, bronze medalist(s)	England
4	Scotland
5	Germany
6	Sweden
7	Switzerland
8	France
9	Italy
10	Belgium
11	Denmark
12	Netherlands
13	Finland
14	Iceland
15	Portugal
16	Austria

== See also ==
- Eisenhower Trophy – biennial world amateur team golf championship for men organized by the International Golf Federation.
- European Ladies' Team Championship – European amateur team golf championship for women organised by the European Golf Association.
