= Jeremy Paul (golfer) =

German professional golfer (born 1994)

Personal information
- Nationality: Germany
- Born: 5 March 1994 (age 32) Frankfurt, Germany
- Height: 6 ft 1 in (185 cm)
- Weight: 79 kg (174 lb)

Career
- Sport: Golf
- College: University of Colorado
- Turned professional: 2017
- Current tour: PGA Tour
- Former tours: Korn Ferry Tour; PGA Tour Canada
- Professional wins: 2

Number of wins by tour
- Korn Ferry Tour: 1
- Other: 1

Jeremy Paul (born 5 March 1994) is a German professional golfer who plays on the PGA Tour.

== Early life ==
Paul was born in Frankfurt in 1994, a minute before his twin brother Yannik, who is a professional golfer who plays on the European Tour.

== Amateur career ==
In 2011, Paul finished runner-up in the German Under-18 Championship, was a semi-finalist in the Boys Amateur Championship at Burnham & Berrow Golf Club, and finished third in the German Junior Masters.

Paul attended the University of Colorado from 2013 to 2018. He was an All-American and graduated with a degree in business in May 2017, having led the team in stroke average all four years and set or tied 24 school records.

He was also a member of the German team at the 2016 Eisenhower Trophy, and the European Amateur Team Championship in 2015 and 2016, playing alongside his twin brother Yannik. He and Yannik also became the first pair of twins to play in a European Tour event, when they both played in the 2016 BMW International Open.

== Professional career ==
Paul turned professional in April 2017 and joined the Korn Ferry Tour. For 2018, he dropped down to the PGA Tour Canada and made a few starts on the Pro Golf Tour, where he secured his first professional win at the Red Sea Ain Sokhna Classic in Egypt.

In November 2021, Paul finished tied 11th at the Qualifying Tournament's Final Stage to re-join the Korn Ferry Tour for the 2022 season. In 2022, he recorded several top-5s, including a season best tie for 3rd at The Ascendant, on familiar turf in Colorado. He finished the season 37th in the rankings, outside the top-25 that earn promotion to the PGA Tour.

In January 2024, Paul claimed his first victory on the Korn Ferry Tour at The Bahamas Great Exuma Classic.

== Amateur wins ==
- 2014 The Duck Invitational
- 2015 Ballyneal Challenge
- 2016 Wyoming Cowboy Classic

== Professional wins (2) ==
=== Korn Ferry Tour wins (1) ===
No.	Date	Tournament	Winning score	Margin of victory	Runner-up
1	17 Jan 2024	The Bahamas Great Exuma Classic	−17 (70-67-67-67=271)	1 stroke	(United States) Kevin Roy

=== Pro Golf Tour wins (1) ===
No.	Date	Tournament	Winning score	Margin of victory	Runners-up
1	23 Jan 2018	Red Sea Ain Sokhna Classic	−13 (65-70-68=203)	1 stroke	(Italy) Raffaele Benatti, (Scotland) Craig Howie

== Team appearances ==
Amateur

- European Amateur Team Championship (representing Germany): 2015, 2016
- Eisenhower Trophy (representing Germany): 2016

== See also ==
- 2024 Korn Ferry Tour graduates
