= Gavin Moynihan =

Irish golfer (born 1994)

Personal information
- Nationality: Ireland
- Born: 17 September 1994 (age 32) Dublin, Ireland
- Height: 5 ft 7 in (1.70 m)

Career
- Sport: Golf
- College: University of Alabama
- Turned professional: 2015
- Current tour: European Tour
- Former tours: Challenge Tour; PGA EuroPro Tour
- Professional wins: 2

Gavin Moynihan (born 17 September 1994) is an Irish professional golfer who plays on the European Tour. Partnered with Paul Dunne, they won the 2018 GolfSixes.

== Amateur career ==
Moynihan had a successful amateur career winning the Irish Amateur Open Championship in 2012 and 2015 and twice playing in the Walker Cup. He attended the University of Alabama from 2013 but left during his sophomore year.

== Professional career ==
Moynihan turned professional immediately after the 2015 Walker Cup, making his professional debut in the 2015 Italian Open. During 2016 he made the cut in the Irish Open and tied for third in the Open La Pinetina on the Alps Tour. He had his first professional win in April 2017 when he won the Lookers Championship on the PGA EuroPro Tour. The next month he was runner-up in the Andalucía Costa del Sol Match Play 9, on the Challenge Tour, losing 2&1 to Aaron Rai in the final. He finished the season in 18th place in the Challenge Tour Order of Merit and then earned a 2018 European Tour card through Q School after finishing tied for 25th place in the 6-round final stage.

Moynihan had a poor start to 2018, although, partnered with Paul Dunne, they won the GolfSixes in early May. It was not until the SSE Scottish Hydro Challenge, towards the end of June, that he made the cut in an individual event. He had a number of better finishes towards the end of the year, including a tie for 8th place in the Andalucía Valderrama Masters, and the season ended successfully when he earned a 2019 European Tour card through Q School after finishing tied for 20th place in the 6-round final stage. He qualified by one stroke for a second year running by sinking a five-foot putt on the 18th hole at Lumine Golf Club in Tarragona.

Moynihan started his 2019 European Tour schedule at the AfrAsia Bank Mauritius Open and had a solid 11th-place finish. On 3 March 2019, Moynihan finished in a tied 12th position at the Oman Open

== Amateur wins ==
- 2012 Peter McEvoy Trophy, Irish Amateur Open Championship
- 2013 Carrick Neill Scottish Open Championship
- 2015 Irish Amateur Open Championship

== Professional wins (2) ==
=== PGA EuroPro Tour wins (1) ===
No.	Date	Tournament	Winning score	Margin of victory	Runner-up
1	28 Apr 2017	Lookers Championship	−9 (68-68-68=204)	1 stroke	(Northern Ireland) Dermot McElroy

=== Other wins (1) ===
No.	Date	Tournament	Winning score	Margin of victory	Runners-up
1	6 May 2017	GolfSixes (with (Republic of Ireland) Paul Dunne)	2–0		France − Mike Lorenzo-Vera and Romain Wattel

== Team appearances ==
Amateur

- European Boys' Team Championship (representing Ireland): 2011, 2012
- Jacques Léglise Trophy (representing Great Britain & Ireland): 2011 (winners), 2012 (captain)
- Junior Ryder Cup (representing Europe): 2012
- Eisenhower Trophy (representing Ireland): 2012, 2014
- European Amateur Team Championship (representing Ireland): 2013, 2014, 2015
- Walker Cup (representing Great Britain & Ireland): 2013, 2015 (winners)
- Bonallack Trophy (representing Europe): 2014 (winners)

== See also ==
- 2017 European Tour Qualifying School graduates
- 2018 European Tour Qualifying School graduates
