= Niklas Nørgaard =

Danish professional golfer

Personal information
- Full name: Niklas Nørgaard Møller
- Nationality: Denmark
- Born: 31 May 1992 (age 34) Copenhagen, Denmark

Career
- Sport: Golf
- Turned professional: 2015
- Current tours: PGA Tour; European Tour
- Former tours: Challenge Tour; Nordic Golf League
- Professional wins: 4
- Highest ranking: 83 (19 January 2025) (as of 25 October 2026)

Number of wins by tour
- European Tour: 1
- Other: 3

Best results in major championships
- Masters Tournament: DNP
- PGA Championship: CUT: 2025
- U.S. Open: T43: 2026
- The Open Championship: CUT: 2025

Achievements and awards
- Nordic Golf League Order of Merit winner: 2019

Niklas Nørgaard Møller (born 31 May 1992) is a Danish professional golfer who plays on the European Tour.

== Amateur career ==
Nørgaard was part of the Danish National Team and played in the 2014 Eisenhower Trophy in Japan. He appeared in the European Amateur Team Championship three times between 2013 and 2015, collecting a silver medal in 2015 at Halmstad Golf Club, after losing the final to Scotland.

== Professional career ==
Nørgaard turned professional ahead of the 2016 season and joined the Nordic Golf League. In 2019 he topped the NGL Order of Merit and earned promotion to the Challenge Tour, after recording one victory and six runner-up finishes.

Nørgaard enjoyed a solid 2021 season on the Challenge Tour with seven top-ten finishes, including fourth-place finishes at the D+D Real Czech Challenge and the Range Servant Challenge in Sweden. He earned promotion to the European Tour for 2022 after finishing 16th on the 2021 Challenge Tour's Road to Mallorca Rankings, following a performance at the Challenge Tour Grand Final that pushed him up from 21st position into the graduating ranks.

In his rookie season on the European Tour, Nørgaard recorded top-10 finishes at the Porsche European Open, the Volvo Car Scandinavian Mixed and the Alfred Dunhill Links Championship, where he tied for 7th.

In September 2024, Nørgaard won his first European Tour title at the Betfred British Masters by two shots ahead of Thriston Lawrence.

== Amateur wins ==
- 2012 DGU Elite Tour Herrer II

== Professional wins (4) ==
=== European Tour wins (1) ===
| No. | Date | Tournament | Winning score | Margin of victory | Runner-up |
|---|---|---|---|---|---|
| 1 | 1 Sep 2024 | Betfred British Masters | −16 (70-66-64-72=272) | 2 strokes | (South Africa) Thriston Lawrence |

=== Nordic Golf League wins (3) ===
| No. | Date | Tournament | Winning score | Margin of victory | Runner(s)-up |
|---|---|---|---|---|---|
| 1 | 8 Jun 2011 | Willis Masters (as an amateur) | −11 (67-69-69=205) | 1 stroke | (Sweden) Fredrik Christensen, (Denmark) Morten Ørum Madsen |
| 2 | 6 Oct 2019 | Race to HimmerLand | −15 (67-63-71=201) | 1 stroke | (Norway) Jarand Ekeland Arnøy |
| 3 | 21 Aug 2020 | Esbjerg Open | −11 (67-69-69=205) | 2 strokes | (Denmark) Nicolai Tinning, (Sweden) Joakim Wikström |

== Results in major championships ==
| Tournament | 2025 | 2026 |
|---|---|---|
| Masters Tournament | | |
| PGA Championship | CUT | |
| U.S. Open | T46 | T43 |
| The Open Championship | CUT | |

Did not play

CUT = missed the half-way cut
"T" = tied

== Team appearances ==
Amateur

- European Amateur Team Championship (representing Denmark): 2013, 2014, 2015
- Eisenhower Trophy (representing Denmark): 2014

Professional

- European Championships (representing Denmark): 2018
- Team Cup (representing Continental Europe): 2025

== See also ==
- 2021 Challenge Tour graduates
- 2024 Race to Dubai dual card winners
