= Yannik Paul =

German professional golfer

Personal information
- Nationality: Germany
- Born: 5 March 1994 (age 32) Frankfurt, Germany
- Height: 6 ft 1 in (185 cm)
- Weight: 77 kg (170 lb)

Career
- Sport: Golf
- College: University of Colorado
- Turned professional: 2018
- Current tour: European Tour
- Former tours: Challenge Tour; PGA Tour Canada
- Professional wins: 2
- Highest ranking: 91 (11 June 2023) (as of 25 October 2026)

Number of wins by tour
- European Tour: 1
- Other: 1

Best results in major championships
- Masters Tournament: DNP
- PGA Championship: T69: 2023
- U.S. Open: CUT: 2022
- The Open Championship: CUT: 2023, 2024

Yannik Paul (born 5 March 1994) is a German professional golfer who plays on the European Tour. He claimed his first victory in his rookie season at the Mallorca Golf Open.

== Amateur career ==
Paul attended the University of Colorado from 2013 to 2018. He was also a member of the German team at the European Amateur Team Championship in 2014, 2015, 2016 and 2017, playing alongside his twin brother Jeremy in 2015 and 2016.

== Professional career ==
Paul turned professional in May 2018. He finished runner-up at the Rolex Challenge Tour Grand Final in 2021, securing his playing rights on the 2022 European Tour, ultimately finishing ninth on the Challenge Tour Rankings.

In October 2022, Paul claimed his first victory on the European Tour at the Mallorca Golf Open. He birdied the final hole to win by one shot ahead of Nicolai von Dellingshausen and Paul Waring.

== Personal life ==
Paul's twin brother Jeremy is also a professional golfer who plays on the PGA Tour, having previously played on the Korn Ferry Tour and PGA Tour Canada. He also won on the Pro Golf Tour in 2018. He and Jeremy also became the first pair of twins to play in a European Tour event, when they both played in the 2016 BMW International Open.

== Professional wins (2) ==
=== European Tour wins (1) ===
No.	Date	Tournament	Winning score	Margin of victory	Runners-up
1	23 Oct 2022	Mallorca Golf Open	−15 (71-64-62-72=269)	1 stroke	(Germany) Nicolai von Dellingshausen, (England) Paul Waring

=== Other wins (1) ===
No.	Date	Tournament	Winning score	Margin of victory	Runners-up
1	5 Aug 2020	Arizona Open	−18 (70-64-64=198)	2 strokes	(United States) Blake Cannon, (United States) Caleb Ramirez

== Results in major championships ==
Tournament	2022	2023	2024
Masters Tournament			
PGA Championship		T69	
U.S. Open	CUT		
The Open Championship		CUT	CUT

Did not play

CUT = missed the half-way cut
"T" = tied

== Team appearances ==
Amateur

- European Amateur Team Championship (representing Germany): 2014, 2015, 2016, 2017

== See also ==
- 2021 Challenge Tour graduates
