= Nick Cullen =

Australian professional golfer (born 1984)

Personal information
- Nationality: Australia
- Born: 10 April 1984 (age 42)
- Height: 6 ft 0 in (1.83 m)
- Weight: 170 lb (77 kg; 12 st)

Career
- Sport: Golf
- College: University of South Australia
- Turned professional: 2009
- Current tour: PGA Tour of Australasia
- Former tours: European Tour; Challenge Tour; Canadian Tour
- Professional wins: 3

Number of wins by tour
- PGA Tour of Australasia: 2
- Other: 1

Best results in major championships
- Masters Tournament: DNP
- PGA Championship: DNP
- U.S. Open: DNP
- The Open Championship: CUT: 2012, 2016

Nick Cullen (born 10 April 1984) is an Australian professional golfer who plays on the PGA Tour of Australasia.

== Career ==
Cullen played on the Canadian Tour in 2010 and has played on the PGA Tour of Australasia since 2011. He earned his first professional win at the Enjoy Jakarta Indonesia Open on the OneAsia Tour in March 2012.

He also qualified for the 2012 Open Championship through International Final Qualifying.

In August 2013, Cullen won his first title on the PGA Tour of Australasia at the Isuzu Queensland Open. He beat countryman Peter O'Malley by five strokes.

The following year, he won one of the PGA Tour of Australia's big three tournaments, in the BetEasy Masters. He prevailed by a single stroke over three players, including Adam Scott.

In 2015, Cullen lost in a playoff to Richard Green at the Oates Vic Open.

A tie for fifth place finish at the 2015 Emirates Australian Open was good enough to see Cullen claim one of the three available spots for 2016 Open Championship.

== Professional wins (3) ==
=== PGA Tour of Australasia wins (2) ===
No.	Date	Tournament	Winning score	Margin of victory	Runner(s)-up
1	25 Aug 2013	Isuzu Queensland Open	−9 (73-72-65-69=279)	5 strokes	(Australia) Peter O'Malley
2	23 Nov 2014	BetEasy Masters	−9 (73-71-66-69=279)	1 stroke	(Australia) James Nitties, (Australia) Adam Scott, (Australia) Josh Younger

PGA Tour of Australasia playoff record (0–1)

No.	Year	Tournament	Opponent	Result
1	2015	Oates Vic Open	(Australia) Richard Green	Lost to birdie on second extra hole

=== OneAsia Tour wins (1) ===
No.	Date	Tournament	Winning score	Margin of victory	Runner-up
1	25 Mar 2012	Enjoy Jakarta Indonesia Open	−9 (72-66-67-74=279)	1 stroke	(New Zealand) David Smail

== Results in major championships ==
Tournament	2012	2013	2014	2015	2016
Masters Tournament					
U.S. Open					
The Open Championship	CUT				CUT
PGA Championship					

Did not play

CUT = missed the halfway cut

== Results in World Golf Championships ==
Tournament	2015
Championship	
Match Play	
Invitational	T75
Champions	T58

Did not play

"T" = Tied

== Team appearances ==
Amateur

- Australian Men's Interstate Teams Matches (representing South Australia): 2006, 2007, 2008

== See also ==
- 2018 European Tour Qualifying School graduates
