= Adam Blommé =

Swedish professional golfer (born 1996)

Personal information
- Full name: Adam William Blommé
- Nationality: Sweden
- Born: 19 April 1996 (age 30) Stockholm, Sweden

Career
- Sport: Golf
- Partner: Matilda Wahren
- College: Odessa College; Texas Tech University
- Turned professional: 2019
- Current tour: European Tour
- Former tours: Challenge Tour; Nordic Golf League; Swedish Golf Tour
- Professional wins: 4

Number of wins by tour
- Challenge Tour: 1
- Other: 3

Achievements and awards
- Swedish Golf Tour Order of Merit winner: 2021

Adam Blommé (born 19 April 1996) is a Swedish professional golfer. He won the 2021 Swedish Golf Tour Order of Merit and joined the Challenge Tour, where he won the 2023 Swiss Challenge and finished 6th in the rankings to graduate to the European Tour.

== Amateur career ==
Blommé won several titles on the junior circuit in Sweden. He lost a playoff to Marcus Kinhult at the 2014 Swedish Junior Strokeplay Championship, and was runner-up at the event again in 2015.

He appeared for the National Team at the European Amateur Team Championship three times, securing the bronze medal at the 2015 European Amateur Team Championship alongside Tobias Edén and Marcus Kinhult. In 2017, he won his semi-final match against Manuel Elvira of Spain, and his team finished fourth.

He was part of the Swedish team that finished 4th in the 2014 Eisenhower Trophy in Kuruizawa, Japan, where he was beaten by Kinhult as the best Swedish player, who had the 6th best individual score, five strokes from winner Jon Rahm.

Blommé played collegiate golf at Odessa College 2015–2017, where he won individually four times and secured the win for the Odessa Wranglers in the NJCAA's National Championship, and helped the team become the number one ranked in the nation. After two years he transferred to Texas Tech University, where he played with the Texas Tech Red Raiders golf team 2017–2019. He helped recruit Ludvig Åberg to Texas Tech.

Representing Sweden at the 2019 Spirit International Amateur alongside Vincent Norrman, Beatrice Wallin and Maja Stark, he helped secured the men's silver, only beaten by the U.S. team.

== Professional career ==
Blommé turned professional in late 2019 and joined the Swedish Golf Tour. In 2021, he recorded nine top-10 finishes, including reaching the final of the Swedish Matchplay Championship, and topped the Order of Merit. He finished fourth in the Nordic Golf League rankings to earn promotion to the Challenge Tour.

In 2023, Blommé led the Dimension Data Pro-Am in South Africa after two rounds, and finished the tournament as runner-up, four shots behind Oliver Bekker. With the result, he rose to No 1 status on the Challenge Tour's Road to Mallorca standings. He shot a 63 to take the lead after round one in the Nelson Mandela Bay Championship the following week, before a 9 on the penultimate hole saw him crash down the results list.

In September, he won the Swiss Challenge in a playoff against compatriot Jesper Svensson to finish 6th in the season rankings and graduate to the European Tour for 2024.

== Amateur wins ==
- 2009 Skandia Tour Distriktsfinal SGDF
- 2012 Titleist Footjoy Junior Open, Alex Norén Junior Open
- 2013 Vassunda Junior Open
- 2016 NJCAA SW Championship, NJCAA District 2 Championship, High Country Shootout
- 2017 NJCAA District 2 Championship

== Professional wins (4) ==
=== Challenge Tour wins (1) ===
No.	Date	Tournament	Winning score	Margin of victory	Runner-up
1	24 Sep 2023	Swiss Challenge	−17 (67-69-69-66=271)	Playoff	(Sweden) Jesper Svensson

Challenge Tour playoff record (1–0)

No.	Year	Tournament	Opponent	Result
1	2023	Swiss Challenge	(Sweden) Jesper Svensson	Won with bogey on first extra hole

=== Swedish Future Series wins (3) ===
No.	Date	Tournament	Winning score	Margin of victory	Runner-up
1	11 Aug 2019	Siljan Open (as an amateur)	−15 (66-63=129)	3 strokes	(Sweden) Adam Guedra
2	13 Sep 2020	Ovako Hagge Open	−5 (67-70=137)	1 stroke	(Sweden) Olle Widegren
3	15 Aug 2021	Siljan Open (2)	−12 (66-62=128)	3 strokes	(Sweden) Joel Wendin

== Team appearances ==
Amateur

- European Boys' Team Championship (representing Sweden): 2013, 2014
- Jacques Léglise Trophy (representing Continental Europe): 2014
- Eisenhower Trophy (representing Sweden): 2014
- European Amateur Team Championship (representing Sweden): 2015, 2016, 2017
- Spirit International Amateur (representing Sweden): 2019

== See also ==
- 2023 Challenge Tour graduates
- 2026 European Tour Qualifying School graduates
