= 2014 Eisenhower Trophy =

Coordinates: 36.312°N 138.632°E

Tournament information
- Dates: 10–13 September 2014
- Location: Karuizawa, Japan
- Courses: Karuizawa 72 Golf East (Iriyama and Oshitate courses)
- Organized by: International Golf Federation
- Format: 72 holes stroke play

Statistics
- Par: 72 (Iriyama); 71 (Oshitate)
- Field: 67 teams 200 players

Champion
- United States; Bryson DeChambeau, Beau Hossler & Denny McCarthy
- 534 (−38)
- Location in Japan Location in Nagano Prefecture

The 2014 Eisenhower Trophy took place 10–13 September on the Iriyama and Oshitate courses at Karuizawa 72 Golf East in Karuizawa, Japan. It was the 29th World Amateur Team Championship for the Eisenhower Trophy and the second to be held in Japan. The tournament was a 72-hole stroke play team event with 67 three-man teams. The best two scores for each round counted towards the team total. Each team played two rounds on the two courses. The leading teams played on the Oshitate course on the third day and on the Iriyama course on the final day.

United States won their 15th Eisenhower Trophy, two strokes ahead of Canada, who took the silver medal. Spain took the bronze medal one stroke ahead of Sweden at fourth. The top eight teams finished within six strokes.

Jon Rahm had the best 72-hole aggregate of 263.

The 2014 Espirito Santo Trophy was played on the same courses one week prior.

== Teams ==
67 teams contested the event. Each team had three players with the exception of Ghana who were represented by only two players.

The following table lists the players on the leading teams.

Country	Players
Argentina	Jaime López Rivarola, Matias Simaski, Alejandro Tosti
Australia	Geoff Drakeford, Lucas Herbert, Ryan Ruffels
Austria	Robin Goger, Lukas Lipold, Markus Maukner
Belgium	Thomas Detry, Samuel Echikson, Kevin Hesbois
Canada	Corey Conners, Taylor Pendrith, Adam Svensson
Chile	Martin Cancino, Matías Domínguez, Mito Pereira
Denmark	Nicolai Kristensen, Martin Simonsen, Niklas Nørgaard
England	Ashley Chesters, Ryan Evans, Ben Stow
France	Victor Perez, Robin Sciot-Siegrist, Clément Sordet
Germany	Hurly Long, Max Mehles, Max Rottluff
Ireland	Paul Dunne, Gary Hurley, Gavin Moynihan
Italy	Enrico Di Nitto, Guido Migliozzi, Renato Paratore
Mexico	Álvaro Ortiz, Gerardo Ruiz, Aaron Terrazas
Scotland	Grant Forrest, Bradley Neil, Chris Robb
South Korea	Kim Nam-hun, Kong Tae-hyun, Youm Eun-ho
Spain	Daniel Berna, Mario Galiano, Jon Rahm
Sweden	Adam Blommé, Marcus Kinhult, Hannes Rönneblad
Switzerland	Mathias Eggenberger, Marco Iten, Benjamin Rusch
Thailand	Suradit Yongcharoenchai, Chanachok Dejpiratanamongkol, Nattawat Suvajanakorn
Chinese Taipei	Pan Cheng-tsung, Kevin Yu, Wang Wei-lun
United States	Bryson DeChambeau, Beau Hossler, Denny McCarthy
Wales	David Boote, Mike Hearne, Rhys Pugh

== Results ==
Place	Country	Score	To par
1st place, gold medalist(s)	United States	136-133-128-137=534	−38
2nd place, silver medalist(s)	Canada	134-136-133-133=536	−36
3rd place, bronze medalist(s)	Spain	138-133-132-134=537	−35
4	Sweden	134-135-131-138=538	−34
5	Argentina	135-133-136-135=539	−33
T6	Australia	137-136-132-135=540	−32
T6	England	136-135-137-132=540	−32
T6	France	140-134-135-131=540	−32
9	Scotland	138-133-138-133=542	−30
10	Switzerland	134-135-140-135=544	−28
11	Ireland	138-138-132-137=545	−27
12	Germany	137-137-138-134=546	−26
T13	Belgium	138-138-140-132=548	−24
T13	Denmark	133-140-138-137=548	−24
T13	Italy	140-134-139-135=548	−24
16	Chinese Taipei	137-137-135-140=549	−23
17	Mexico	138-136-135-141=550	−22
18	South Korea	142-138-135-136=551	−21
T19	Austria	140-135-138-141=554	−18
T19	Chile	136-139-138-141=554	−18
21	Colombia	141-141-135-138=555	−17
T22	Czech Republic	135-141-136-145=557	−15
T22	New Zealand	144-137-139-137=557	−15
T22	Poland	142-144-135-136=557	−15
T25	Finland	144-143-137-134=558	−14
T25	Norway	141-139-136-142=558	−14
T25	Singapore	142-138-136-142=558	−14
T25	Slovenia	140-141-135-142=558	−14
T29	India	141-142-140-137=560	−12
T29	Japan	138-140-144-138=560	−12
T31	Puerto Rico	137-142-142-140=561	−11
T31	Venezuela	139-141-138-143=561	−11
T33	Brazil	140-147-141-135=563	−9
T33	Thailand	140-145-136-142=563	−9
T35	Portugal	143-142-142-137=564	−8
T35	Malaysia	143-143-140-138=564	−8
T35	Wales	138-145-136-145=564	−8
38	China	142-138-140-145=565	−7
T39	Hong Kong	141-145-145-136=567	−5
T39	Netherlands	142-147-139-139=567	−5
41	Slovakia	144-144-141-141=570	−2
42	Guatemala	148-139-144-140=571	−1
43	South Africa	144-142-145-142=573	+1
44	Costa Rica	146-140-144-145=575	+3
45	Bermuda	142-142-147-148=579	+7
46	Turkey	152-144-151-140=587	+15
47	Philippines	148-149-150-147=594	+22
T48	Guam	144-146-152-153=595	+23
T48	Uruguay	150-151-148-146=595	+23
T50	Iran	144-161-146-145=596	+24
T50	Malta	146-150-149-151=596	+24
52	Fiji	143-155-153-146=597	+25
53	Russia	144-154-154-146=598	+26
T54	Dominican Republic	152-147-153-151=603	+31
T54	Serbia	154-148-157-144=603	+31
56	Jamaica	149-156-152-151=608	+36
T57	Estonia	156-146-157-152=611	+39
T57	United Arab Emirates	156-157-152-146=611	+39
59	Mauritius	155-159-151-148=613	+41
60	Greece	149-159-159-152=619	+47
61	Bahrain	154-156-157-156=623	+51
62	Qatar	153-161-162-151=627	+55
63	Ghana	164-162-164-167=657	+85
64	Ukraine	170-178-165-160=673	+101
65	El Salvador	179-169-171-160=679	+107
66	Gabon	174-176-165-169=684	+112
67	Kyrgyzstan	189-186-185-170=730	+158

== Individual leaders ==
There was no official recognition for the lowest individual scores.

Place	Player	Country	Score	To par
1	Jon Rahm	Spain	70-64-62-67=263	−23
T2	Lucas Herbert	Australia	69-64-67-66=266	−20
T2	Victor Perez	France	69-65-66-66=266	−20
T2	Alejandro Tosti	Argentina	68-67-64-67=266	−20
5	Denny McCarthy	United States	68-68-67-64=267	−19
6	Marcus Kinhult	Sweden	65-66-67-70=268	−18
7	Adam Svensson	Canada	69-69-66-65=269	−17
T8	Corey Conners	Canada	66-69-67-68=270	−16
T8	Bryson DeChambeau	United States	69-67-61-73=270	−16
T8	Renato Paratore	Italy	69-67-68-66=270	−16
T8	Ben Stow	England	67-67-68-68=270	−16
