= Doha Golf Club =

Golf course in Doha, Qatar

Coordinates: 25°23′2.70″N 51°30′26.27″E

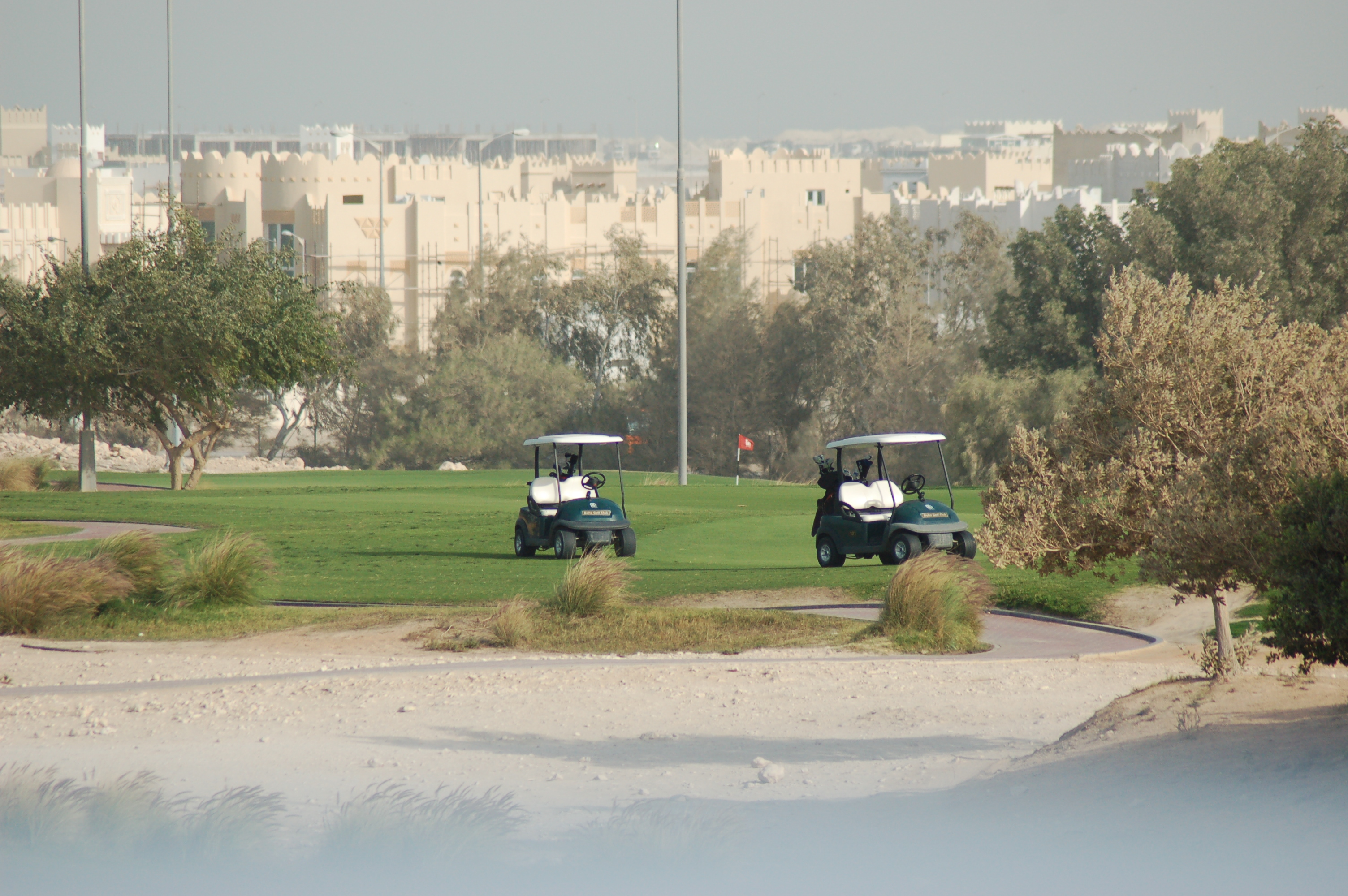
View of the golf course at Doha Golf Club

The Doha Golf Club in Doha, Qatar is an 18-hole, 7,374-yard, par 72 championship course that was designed by Peter Harradine. The Doha Golf Club is also one of the first grass golf courses ever built in the Middle East. Open to nonmembers, it has a 2 808 yards long floodlit nine-hole academy course, and a clubhouse with three restaurants and a golf shop.

The club hosts the Qatar Masters golf tournament.

== Past Directors of Golf ==
- Gary McGlinchey
- Greg Holmes
- David Moreland

== Geography ==
The Doha Golf Club is located in Al Egla, a northern district of Qatar's capital Doha which is just north of West Bay.

== Features ==
=== Clubhouse ===
The Doha Golf Club also has a clubhouse.

=== Courses ===
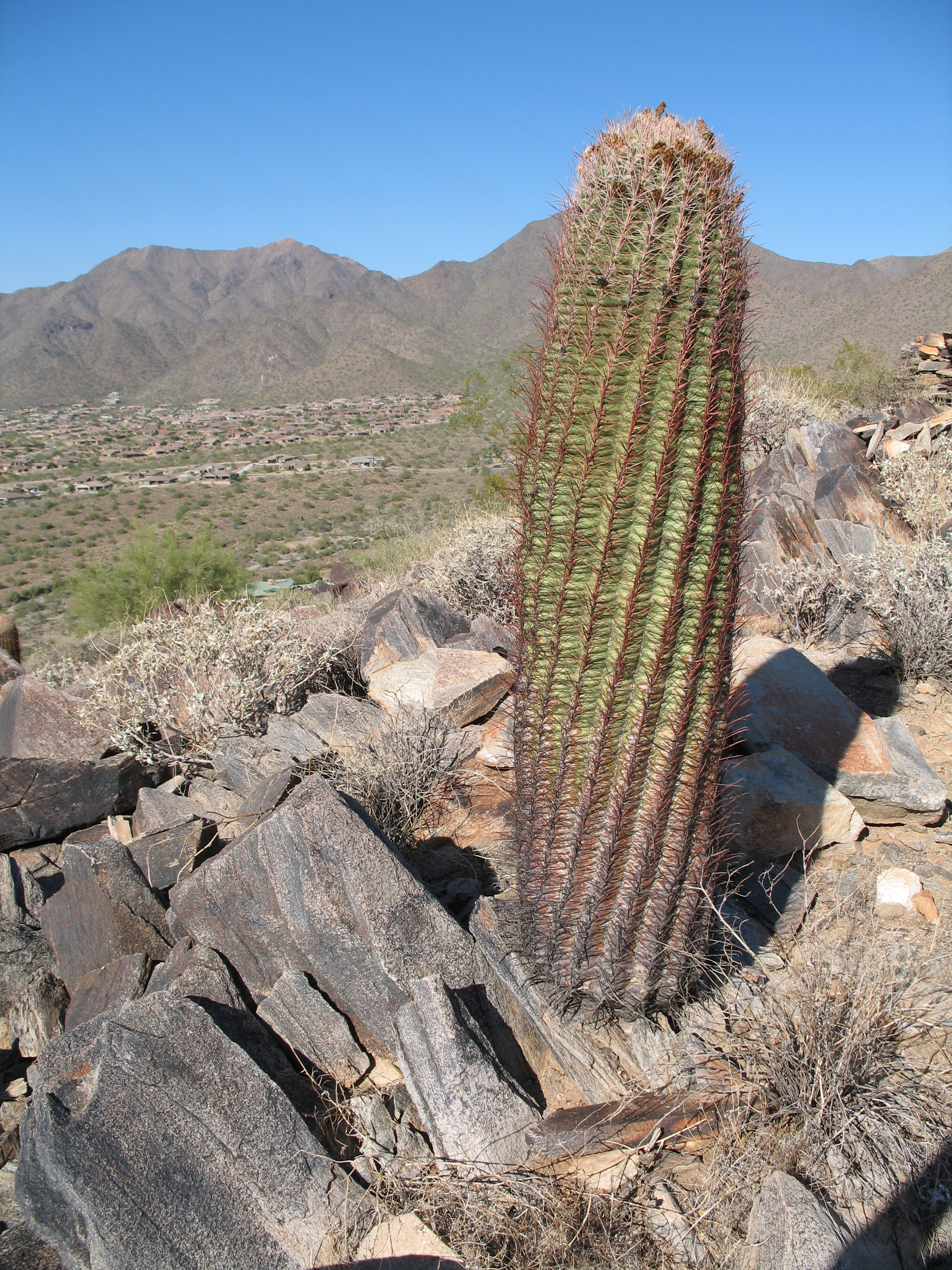
A barrel cactus from Arizona, one of the features in the courses of the Doha Golf Club.

The Doha Golf Club was designed with eight strategically positioned lakes, 65 giant cacti which were imported from the deserts of Arizona, more than 10 000 green trees and shrubs, numerous limestone formations and an abundance of lush and lengthy fairways, which were all designed to present a startling contrast to the desert that surrounds this green golf club.

Features	Information
Type	Public
Holes	18
Year Built	1997
Guest Policy	Welcomed
Golf Season	Year Round
Metal Spikes Allowed	No
Driving Range Available	Yes
Putting Green Available	Yes
Rental Carts Available	Yes
Rental Trolleys Available	Yes
Rental Clubs Available	Yes
GPS	Yes
Pro Shop	Yes
Teaching Pro	Yes
Golf School	Yes
Tee Times Welcomed	Yes
Price Range Weekdays	420
Price Range Weekends	650
Credit Cards Accepted	Yes
Changing Rooms, Lockers and Bag Storage Available	Yes

Tee	Par	Length	Slope	Rating
White	72	6 640 yards	0	0
Blue	72	7 374 yards	0	0
Yellow	72	6 299 yards	0	0
Red (W)	73	5 693 yards	0	0

== See also ==
- Sport in Qatar
