= Mallorca Golf Open =

Golf tournament in Spain

Coordinates: 39.512°N 2.499°E

Tournament information
- Location: Mallorca, Spain
- Established: 2021
- Course: Son Muntaner Golf Club
- Par: 71
- Length: 6,952 yards (6,357 m)
- Tour: European Tour
- Format: Stroke play
- Prize fund: US$2,000,000
- Month played: October
- Final year: 2022

Tournament record score
- Aggregate: 265 Jeff Winther (2021)
- To par: −15 Jeff Winther (2021) −15 Yannik Paul (2022)

Final champion
- (Germany) Yannik Paul

Location map
- Location in Spain Location in the Balearic Islands Location in Mallorca

The Mallorca Golf Open was a professional golf tournament held from 21–24 October 2021 at Golf Santa Ponsa in Mallorca, Spain.

Intended as a one-off event, the tournament was the first European Tour played in Mallorca since the Iberdrola Open in 2011.

Jeff Winther shot 62 twice en route to a one-shot victory.

In August 2022, it was announced that the tournament would return for a second time.

== Winners ==
Year	Winner	Score	To par	Margin of victory	Runners-up
2022	(Germany) Yannik Paul	269	−15	1 stroke	(Germany) Nicolai von Dellingshausen (England) Paul Waring
2021	(Denmark) Jeff Winther	265	−15	1 stroke	(Spain) Pep Anglès (Spain) Jorge Campillo (Sweden) Sebastian Söderberg
