= Danish Golf Championship =

Coordinates: 56.1747°N 9.6289°E

Tournament information
- Location: Kerteminde, Denmark
- Established: 2014
- Course: Great Northern
- Par: 72
- Length: 7,314 yards (6,688 m)
- Tour: European Tour
- Format: Stroke play
- Prize fund: US$3,000,000
- Month played: August

Tournament record score
- Aggregate: 263 Oliver Wilson (2022)
- To par: −21 as above

Current champion
- (Denmark) Jeff Winther

Location map
- Location in Denmark

The Danish Golf Championship is a professional golf tournament on the European Tour that is played annually in Denmark.

== History ==
The inaugural tournament was played from 14 to 17 August 2014 at the HimmerLand Golf & Spa Resort, in Farsø, Denmark. HimmerLand hosted the event from 2014 to 2017. In 2015, the tournament featured the shortest par-3 hole in European Tour history, when the 16th hole played just 79 yards (72 m) in the final round.

In 2018, the Made in Denmark tournament was played at Silkeborg Ry Golfklub, before returning to HimmerLand Golf & Spa Resort in 2019. During the Made in Denmark Challenge in June 2018, the organisation behind the tournament announced that Made in Denmark would continue for another five years, until 2023.

Following the confirmation that HimmerLand Golf & Spa Resort would cease hosting from 2024 onwards, it was announced that Lübker Golf Resort would host the 2024 event, being renamed as the Danish Golf Championship.

== Winners ==
Year	Winner	Score	To par	Margin of victory	Runner(s)-up	Venue
Danish Golf Championship
2026	(Denmark) Jeff Winther	273	−15	3 strokes	(Italy) Filippo Celli (Denmark) Rasmus Højgaard (England) Matthew Jordan (Finland) Oliver Lindell (China) Zhou Yanhan	Great Northern
2025	(England) Marco Penge	268	−16	1 stroke	(Denmark) Rasmus Højgaard	Furesø
2024	(France) Frédéric Lacroix	270	−14	4 strokes	(Denmark) Lucas Bjerregaard (France) Romain Langasque	Lübker
Made in HimmerLand
2023	(Denmark) Rasmus Højgaard	267	−13	Playoff	(Spain) Nacho Elvira	HimmerLand
2022	(England) Oliver Wilson	263	−21	1 stroke	(Scotland) Ewen Ferguson	HimmerLand
2021	(Austria) Bernd Wiesberger (2)	263 (Note: Unofficial scoring record due to preferred lies being in place.)	−21	5 strokes	(Italy) Guido Migliozzi	HimmerLand
Made in Denmark
2020	Cancelled due to COVID-19 pandemic					
2019	(Austria) Bernd Wiesberger	270	−14	1 stroke	(Scotland) Robert MacIntyre	HimmerLand
2018	(England) Matt Wallace	269	−19	Playoff	(England) Steven Brown (England) Jonathan Thomson (England) Lee Westwood	Silkeborg Ry
2017	(United States) Julian Suri	265	−19	4 strokes	(England) David Horsey	HimmerLand
2016	(Belgium) Thomas Pieters	267	−17	1 stroke	(Wales) Bradley Dredge	HimmerLand
2015	(England) David Horsey	271	−13	2 strokes	(Sweden) Kristoffer Broberg (Australia) Daniel Gaunt (Denmark) Søren Kjeldsen (Australia) Terry Pilkadaris	HimmerLand
2014	(Scotland) Marc Warren	275	−9	2 strokes	(Wales) Bradley Dredge	HimmerLand

== See also ==
- Nordic Open, previous European Tour event in Denmark
