= 2015 European Amateur Team Championship =

Golf competition

- Official program cover 2015 European Amateur Team Championship

Tournament information
- Dates: 9–13 July 2015
- Location: Halmstad, Sweden; 56.662264°N 12.749291°E
- Course: Halmstad Golf Club (North Course)
- Organized by: European Golf Association
- Format: Qualification round: 36 holes stroke play Knock-out match-play

Statistics
- Par: 72
- Length: 7,001 yards (6,402 m)
- Field: 16 teams 96 players

Champion
- Scotland; Ewen Ferguson, Grant Forrest, Greig Marchbank, Jack McDonald, Graeme Robertson, Connor Syme
- Qualification round: 724 (+4); Final match: 4 1/2–2 1/2
- Location in Europe Location in Sweden Location in Halland County

The 2015 European Amateur Team Championship took place 7–11 July at Halmstad Golf Club, in Tylösand, Sweden. It was the 32nd men's golf European Amateur Team Championship.

== Venue ==
The tournament was played at the Halmstad Golf Club's North course in Tylösand, Halmstad Municipality, 9 kilometers west of Halmstad city center in Halland County, Sweden.

The club was founded in 1930. Its first 18-hole course was constructed by Rafael Sundblom and approved in 1938. Another nine holes, constructed by Nils Sköld, was inaugurated in 1967. Together with the last nine holes of the old course, this formed the new course, called the North Course.

The club had previously hosted the 1985 European Amateur Team Championship and the 2007 Solheim Cup.

The championship course was set up with par 72.

== Format ==
Each team consisted of 6 players, playing two rounds of stroke-play over two days, counting the five best scores each day for each team.

The eight best teams formed flight A, in knock-out match-play over the next three days. The teams were seeded based on their positions after the stroke play. The first placed team was drawn to play the quarter-final against the eight placed team, the second against the seventh, the third against the sixth and the fourth against the fifth. Teams were allowed to use six players during the team matches, selecting four of them in the two morning foursome games and five players in to the afternoon single games. Teams knocked out after the quarter-finals played one foursome game and four single games in each of their remaining matches. Games all square at the 18th hole were declared halved, if the team match was already decided.

The eight teams placed 9–16 in the qualification stroke-play formed flight B, to play similar knock-out play, with one foursome game and four single games in each match, to decide their final positions.

== Teams ==
16 nation teams contested the event. Each team consisted of six players.

Players in the teams

Country	Players
Belgium	Alan de Bondt, Aurian Capart, Maxence de Craecker, Thomas Detry, Cedric Van Wassenhove, Frederic De Vooght
Czech Republic	Vaclav Lebl, Vitek Novak, Dominik Pavoucek, Jakub Pokorny, Michal Pospisil, Simon Zach
Denmark	Philip Juel-Berg, Peter Launer Bæk, Martin Leth Simonsen, Niklas Nørgaard, Sixten Stemann Jensen, Morten Toft Hansen
England	Ashley Chesters, Nick Marsh, Jimmy Mullen, Ben Taylor, Sean Towndrow, Ashton Turner
Finland	Kim Koivu, Kristian Kulokorpi, Miki Kuronen, Mikko Lehtovuori, Lauri Ruuska, Linus Väisänen
France	Léonard Bem, Alexandre Daydou, Romain Langasque, Thomas Perrot, Antoine Rozner, Robin Sciot-Siergrist
Germany	Nicolai von Dellingshausen, Hurly Long, Maximilian Mehles, Jeremy Paul, Yannik Paul, Maximilian Rottluff
Ireland	Paul Dunne, Jack Hume, Jack Hurley, Dermot McElroy, Gavin Moynihan, Comac Sharvin
Italy	Luca Cianchetti, Stefano Mazzoli, Jacopo Vecchi Fossa, Frederico Zucchetti, Michele Cea, Lorenzo Scalise
Netherlands	Philip Bootsma, Rowin Caron, Lars Keunen, Jeroen Krietemeijer, Lars van Meijel, Robbie van West
Poland	Jakub Dymeck, Mateusz Gradecki, Adrian Meronk, Alejandro Pedryc, Jan Szmidt Jr., Oskar Zaborowski
Scotland	Ewen Ferguson, Grant Forrest, Greig Marchbank, Jack McDonald, Graeme Robertson, Connor Syme
Spain	Pep Anglès, Adri Arnaus, Iván Cantero, Mario Galiano, Scott Fernández, Jon Rahm
Sweden	Adam Blommé, Oskar Bergqvist, Tobias Edén, Marcus Kinhult, Fredrik Niléhn, Hannes Rönneblad
Switzerland	Louis Bemberg, Mathias Eggenberger, Jeremy Freiburghaus, Marco Iten, Alessandro Noseda, Neal Woernhard
Wales	David Boote, Josh Davies, Owen Edwards, Evan Griffith, Mike Hearne, Richard James

== Winners ==
Leader of the opening 36-hole competition was team Germany with an 11-under-par score of 709, five strokes ahead of team Ireland and a combined team from the Republic of Ireland and Northern Ireland. Host nation Sweden made it to the quarter-finals with a one-stroke-margin on eighth place.

There was no official award for the lowest individual scores, but individual leaders were Robin Sciot-Siergrist, France, and Morten Toft Hansen, Denmark with a 5-under-par score of 139, one stroke ahead of Rowin Caron, the Netherlands.

Team Scotland won the gold medal, earning their seventh title, beating team Denmark in the final 4 1/2–2 1/2. The last time the championship took place at Halmstad Golf Club, in 1985, Scotland also was the champions, winning their second title in the history of the event.

Host nation Sweden earned the bronze on third place, after beating eleven-times-champion England 4–3 in the bronze match.

A second division, named European Amateur Championship Division 2, took place 8–11 July 2015 at Postolowo Golf Club, Poland. The three best placed teams, Portugal, Austria and Norway, qualified for the 2016 European Amateur Team Championship.

Wales, Poland and the Czech Republic placed 14th, 15th and 16th in the first division and were moved to Division 2 for 2016.

== Results ==
Qualification round

Team standings

Place	Country	Score	To par
1	Germany	356-353=709	−11
2	Ireland	355-359=714	−6
3	Spain	360-360=720	E
T4	France *	354-368=722	+2
T4	Denmark	354-368=722	+2
6	Scotland	367-357=724	+4
T7	England *	364-366=730	+10
T7	Sweden	368-362=730	+10
9	Italy	360-371=731	+11
10	Belgium	369-366=735	+15
11	Netherlands	368-369=737	+17
12	Wales	365-378=743	+23
13	Finland	369-378=747	+27
14	Czech Republic	373-380=753	+33
15	Switzerland	385-375=760	+40
16	Poland	405-383=788	+68

* Note: In the event of a tie the order was determined by the
best total of the two non-counting scores of the two rounds.

Individual leaders

Place	Player	Country	Score	To par
T1	Robin Sciot-Siergrist	France	69-70=139	−5
T1	Morten Toft Hansen	Denmark	67-72=139	−5
3	Rowin Caron	Netherlands	69-71=140	−4
T4	Iván Cantero	Spain	73-68=141	−3
T4	Hurly Long	Germany	70-71=141	−3
T4	Jack McDonald	Scotland	70-71=141	−3
T4	Jeremy Paul	Germany	72-69=141	−3
T8	David Boote	Wales	69-73=142	−2
T8	Thomas Detry	Belgium	70-72=142	−2
T8	Paul Dunne	Ireland	74-68=142	−2
T8	Grant Forrest	Scotland	71-71=142	−2
T8	Dermot McElroy	Ireland	70-72=142	−2
T8	Jon Rahm	Spain	70-72=142	−2
T8	Robbie van West	Netherlands	72-70=142	−2

Note: There was no official award for the lowest individual score.

Flight A

Bracket

Quarter finals
Sweden	4
Germany	3
Denmark	4
France	3
Scotland	4.5
Spain	2.5
England	4.5
Ireland	2.5

Semi finals
Denmark	4.5
Sweden	2.5
Scotland	4
England	3

Final
Scotland	4.5
Denmark	2.5
Bronze match
Sweden	4
England	3

Elimination matches
France	3
Germany	2
Ireland	3.5
Spain	1.5

Match for 5th place
Ireland	3
France	2
Match for 7th place
Spain	3.5
Germany	1.5

Final games

Scotland	Denmark
5	2
G. Forrest / E. Ferguson 7 & 5	M. Toft Hansen / S. Stemann Jensen
G. Robertson / J. McDonald 2 & 1	N. Nørgaard / P. Launer Bæk
Grant Forrest 1 up	Niklas Nørgaard
Ewen Ferguson	Martin L Simonsen 2 & 1
Jack McDonald 2 & 1	Morten Toft Hansen
Peter Launer Bæk AS *	Peter Launer Bæk AS *
Greig Marchbank	Philip Juel Berg 6 & 5

* Note: Game declared halved, since team match already decided.

Flight B

Bracket

Round 1
Italy	3.5
Poland	1.5
Finland	3
Wales	2
Netherlands	4
Czech Republic	1
Belgium	4
Switzerland	1

Round 2
Finland	4.5
Italy	0.5
Belgium	3
Netherlands	2

Match for 9th place
Belgium	3.5
Finland	1.5
Match for 11th place
Netherlands	3
Italy	2

Elimination matches
Wales	3
Poland	2
Switzerland	3
Czech Republic	2

Match for 13th place
Switzerland	3
Wales	2
Match for 15th place
Poland	3.5
Czech Republic	1.5

Final standings

Place	Country
1st place, gold medalist(s)	Scotland
2nd place, silver medalist(s)	Denmark
3rd place, bronze medalist(s)	Sweden
4	England
5	Ireland
6	France
7	Spain
8	Germany
9	Belgium
10	Finland
11	Netherlands
12	Italy
13	Switzerland
14	Wales
15	Poland
16	Czech Republic

== See also ==
- Eisenhower Trophy – biennial world amateur team golf championship for men organized by the International Golf Federation.
- European Ladies' Team Championship – European amateur team golf championship for women organised by the European Golf Association.
