= Pep Anglès =

Spanish professional golfer

Personal information
- Full name: Josep Anglès Ros
- Nationality: Spain
- Born: 27 March 1993 (age 33) Barcelona, Spain
- Height: 6 ft 2 in (1.88 m)

Career
- Sport: Golf
- College: University of Central Arkansas
- Turned professional: 2015
- Current tours: Asian Development Tour; Nordic Golf League
- Former tours: European Tour; Challenge Tour; Alps Tour
- Professional wins: 2

Number of wins by tour
- Challenge Tour: 1
- Other: 1

Achievements and awards
- Southland Conference Player of the Year: 2013, 2014, 2015

Josep Anglès Ros (born 27 March 1993) is a Spanish professional golfer from Barcelona and European Tour player. He was runner-up at the 2020 Open de Portugal and the 2021 Mallorca Golf Open.

== Early life and amateur career ==
Anglès grew up in Sant Andreu de Llavaneres, thirty minutes north of Barcelona, and learned to play at the local par-3 course.

Representing Spain, Anglès won the 2011 European Boys' Team Championship, and the 2014 European Amateur Team Championship, both times with a team that included Jon Rahm. He also won the 2014 Palmer Cup with the Europe team.

Anglès played college golf at the University of Central Arkansas with the Central Arkansas Bears men's golf team between 2011 and 2015. He had 5 tournament wins, 6 runner-ups, 14 top-5 finishes and 27 top-10 finishes, and broke the college’s record for the lowest round score after carding a 64. He was Southland Conference Player of the Year for three consecutive years.

== Professional career ==
Anglès turned professional in the fall of 2015, and won in his first event as a professional, the Open International du Haut Poitou, an Alps Tour event in France.

Anglès attended European Tour Qualifying School and joined the 2016 Challenge Tour, where he was solo 3rd at the Challenge de Madrid, two strokes behind winner Duncan Stewart, and runner-up at the Rolex Trophy and the Hainan Open in China. He finished 14th in the rankings and graduated to the European Tour for 2017.

In his rookie season on the European Tour his best finish was a solo 4th at the Rocco Forte Open in Italy, after which he reached a career-high of 194th on the Official World Golf Ranking. He finished 139th in the Race to Dubai and kept his card through a T12 at the 2017 European Tour Qualifying School.

In 2018, his best finish was a T12 at the Portugal Masters, and he spent 2019 and 2020 on the Challenge Tour. In 2020, he won his first title, the Andalucía Challenge de Cádiz, and also finished runner-up in the Open de Portugal, a European Tour event, one stroke behind Garrick Higgo of South Africa. He finished the season 3rd in the rankings, and again earned promotion to the European Tour.

On the 2021 European Tour, Anglès was runner-up at the Mallorca Golf Open, a stroke behind Jeff Winther.

== Amateur wins ==
- 2011 Bill Ross Intercollegiate
- 2012 D A Weibring Intercollegiate
- 2014 Argent Financial Classic, Reunion Intercollegiate, Bill Ross Intercollegiate
- 2015 Copa de Andalucia

== Professional wins (2) ==
=== Challenge Tour wins (1) ===
No.	Date	Tournament	Winning score	Margin of victory	Runners-up
1	15 Nov 2020	Andalucía Challenge de Cádiz	−14 (72-67-66-69=274)	1 stroke	(England) Matthew Baldwin, (Spain) Alfredo García-Heredia

=== Alps Tour wins (1) ===
No.	Date	Tournament	Winning score	Margin of victory	Runner-up
1	20 Sep 2015	Open International du Haut Poitou	−8 (71-68-69=208)	1 stroke	(Netherlands) Darius van Driel

== Team appearances ==
Amateur

- European Boys' Team Championship (representing Spain): 2011 (winners)
- Palmer Cup (representing Europe): 2014 (winners), 2015
- European Amateur Team Championship (representing Spain): 2014 (winners), 2015

== See also ==
- 2016 Challenge Tour graduates
- 2017 European Tour Qualifying School graduates
