= Chase Hanna =

American professional golfer

Personal information
- Full name: Chase Mitchelson Hanna
- Nationality: United States
- Born: July 28, 1994 (age 32) Kansas City, Missouri, U.S.
- Height: 6 ft 2 in (188 cm)
- Weight: 185 lb (84 kg)

Career
- Sport: Golf
- College: University of Kansas
- Turned professional: 2017
- Current tours: Challenge Tour; Clutch Pro Tour
- Former tours: European Tour; PGA Tour Latinoamérica

Chase Mitchelson Hanna (born July 28, 1994) is an American professional golfer who currently plays on the Challenge Tour.

== Amateur career ==
During his high school years, Hanna won 12 tournaments and lead his team, Shawnee Mission East High, to regional championships in 2011, 2012 and 2013. In 2013, he was the Kansas City Golf Association Junior Player of the Year. He also earned the 2013 Kenneth Smith Award, presented to the top male golfer in the Kansas City area.

Hanna played college golf at University of Kansas and was the 2017 Big 12 Conference individual golf champion. He was a member of the Academic All-Big 12 Rookie Team in 2014, and was an Academic All-Big 12 first-team selection for three seasons in a row; 2015, 2016 and 2017.

== Professional career ==
Hanna turned professional in 2017 and made his debut on the Korn Ferry Tour at the Digital Ally Open in his home town Kansas City, where he began with a first round of 67, but still missed the cut.

In 2018, he played on the PGA Tour Latinoamérica and made 12 cuts in 15 starts to finish 28th on the Order of Merit. His best performance was tied 2nd at Brazil's national open, JHSF Aberto do Brasil.

Playing 22 tournaments on the European Challenge Tour in 2021, with a stroke average of 69.93, finishing 13th on the Order of Merit, earned him playing rights for the 2022 European Tour season.

On March 27, 2022, Hanna finished second at the Commercial Bank Qatar Masters on the European Tour, earning €199,516 and giving him a good chance to secure his card for next season.

In May 2022, Hanna advanced to a career best 173rd on the Official World Golf Ranking.

== Amateur wins ==
- 2013 Kansas Junior Amateur
- 2014 Kansas Amateur
- 2016 Golfweek Conference Challenge
- 2017 Big 12 Championship

== See also ==
- 2021 Challenge Tour graduates
