= Jorge Campillo (golfer) =

Spanish professional golfer

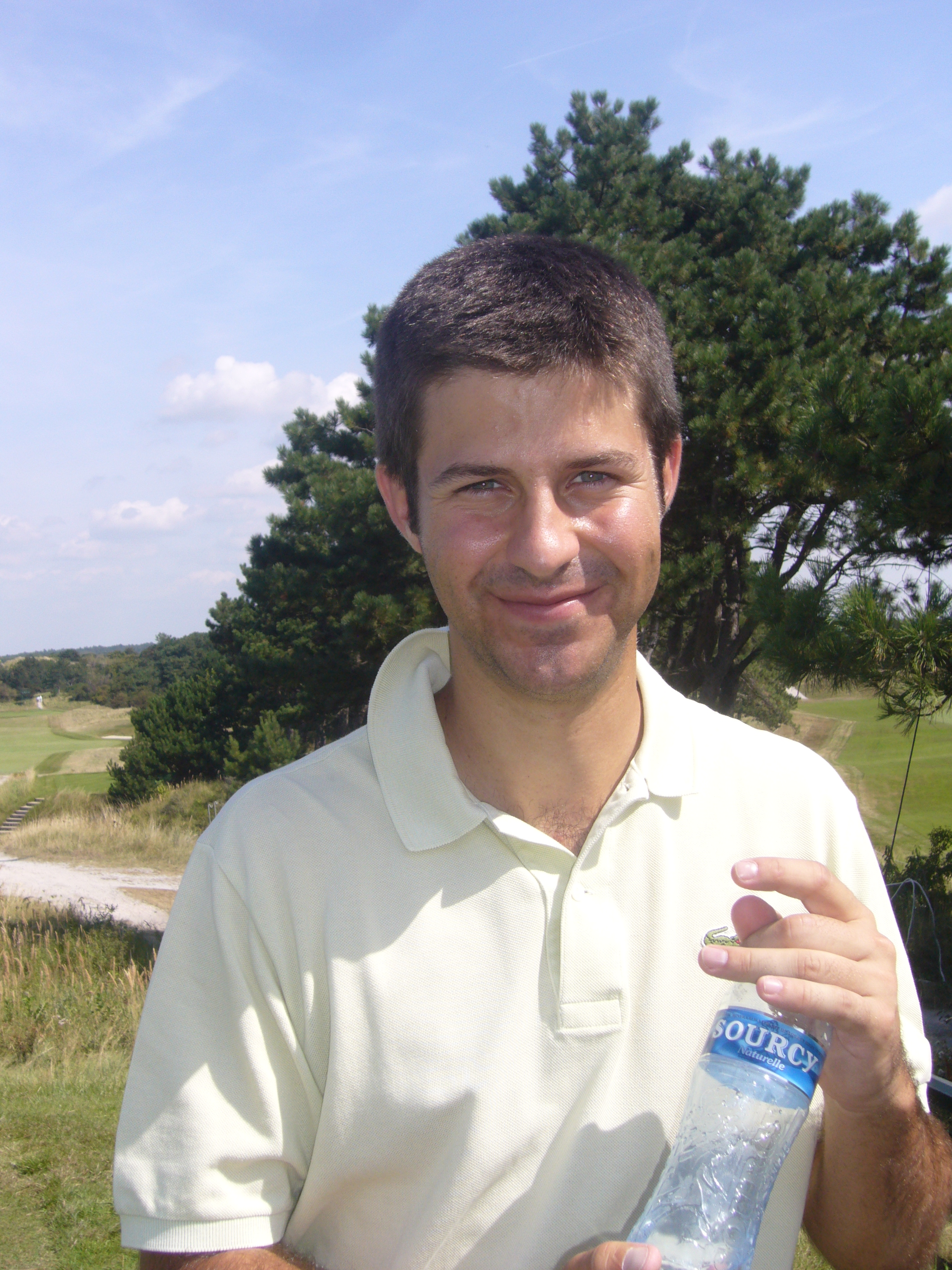
- Campillo at the 2009 KLM Open

Personal information
- Nationality: Spain
- Born: 1 June 1986 (age 40) Cáceres, Spain
- Height: 5 ft 11 in (1.80 m)
- Weight: 176 lb (80 kg; 12.6 st)

Career
- Sport: Golf
- College: Indiana University
- Turned professional: 2009
- Current tour: European Tour
- Former tours: PGA Tour; Challenge Tour
- Professional wins: 3
- Highest ranking: 59 (5 May 2019) (as of 25 October 2026)

Number of wins by tour
- European Tour: 3

Best results in major championships
- Masters Tournament: DNP
- PGA Championship: CUT: 2018, 2019, 2020
- U.S. Open: DNP
- The Open Championship: T43: 2024

Jorge Campillo (born 1 June 1986) is a Spanish professional golfer who plays on the European Tour. He has three European Tour wins, the 2019 Trophée Hassan II, the 2020 Commercial Bank Qatar Masters and the 2023 Magical Kenya Open.

== Amateur career ==
After attending the Spanish national training centre as a junior, Campillo elected to play college golf at Indiana University in the United States. Campillo would go on to become one of the most successful players in the university's history, winning nine intercollegiate titles and being named to the Golfweek First Team All-American squad. He finished second in the 2008 NCAA championship. He also played in the Palmer Cup for Europe in 2007, 2008 and 2009.

== Professional career ==
Campillo turned professional on graduating in 2009 and began playing on invites to the European and Challenge Tours. He recorded top-10 finishes on both tours and ended the season 98th on the Challenge Tour standings. He played full-time on the Challenge Tour in 2010, improving to 87th in the standings and reaching the final stage of qualifying school, but his breakthrough year was 2011. Campillo recorded two runner-up finishes on the Challenge Tour, in the Acaya Open and the Rolex Trophy, on his way to ninth place in the rankings and promotion to the European Tour.

Campillo made a good start on the European Tour, finishing tied for second place in the Avantha Masters in New Delhi, India in February 2012. He has also finished tied for second place in the Nelson Mandela Championship in December 2013 and in the Tshwane Open in March 2017 and was runner-up in the 2018 Maybank Championship.

Campillo made a good start to 2019 with two more runner-up finishes, in the Oman Open and the Commercial Bank Qatar Masters. In April he won the Trophée Hassan II by 2 strokes, his first European Tour win after 229 European Tour starts.

In March 2020, Campillo won the Commercial Bank Qatar Masters in Doha, Qatar, after winning a five-hole sudden death playoff.

In March 2023, Campillo won the Magical Kenya Open. He shot a final-round 66 to win by two shots ahead of Masahiro Kawamura.

== Amateur wins ==
- 2006 Boilermaker Invitational
- 2007 Sofitel Biarritz Cup, Gado North Texas Classic, Pinehurst Intercollegiate
- 2008 UMB Bank-Mizzou Tiger Classic, Boilermaker Invitational, Big Ten Championship, Wolf Run Intercollegiate, Windon Memorial Classic
- 2009 Adidas Hoosier Invitational

== Professional wins (3) ==
=== European Tour wins (3) ===
No.	Date	Tournament	Winning score	Margin of victory	Runner(s)-up
1	28 Apr 2019	Trophée Hassan II	−9 (72-71-69-71=283)	2 strokes	(United States) Sean Crocker, (United States) Julian Suri, (South Africa) Erik van Rooyen
2	8 Mar 2020	Commercial Bank Qatar Masters	−13 (66-66-67-72=271)	Playoff	(Scotland) David Drysdale
3	12 Mar 2023	Magical Kenya Open	−18 (69-68-63-66=266)	2 strokes	(Japan) Masahiro Kawamura

European Tour playoff record (1–2)

No.	Year	Tournament	Opponent	Result
1	2020	Commercial Bank Qatar Masters	(Scotland) David Drysdale	Won with birdie on fifth extra hole
2	2023	Commercial Bank Qatar Masters	(Finland) Sami Välimäki	Lost to birdie on first extra hole
3	2024	Estrella Damm N.A. Andalucía Masters	(France) Julien Guerrier	Lost to par on ninth extra hole

== Results in major championships ==
Results not in chronological order before 2019 and in 2020.

Tournament	2018	2019	2020	2021	2022	2023	2024
Masters Tournament							
PGA Championship	CUT	CUT	CUT				
U.S. Open							
The Open Championship	CUT	CUT	NT	CUT		CUT	T43

Did not play

CUT = missed the half-way cut
"T" indicates a tie for a place
NT = no tournament due to COVID-19 pandemic

=== Summary ===
Tournament	Wins	2nd	3rd	Top-5	Top-10	Top-25	Events	Cuts made
Masters Tournament	0	0	0	0	0	0	0	0
PGA Championship	0	0	0	0	0	0	3	0
U.S. Open	0	0	0	0	0	0	0	0
The Open Championship	0	0	0	0	0	0	5	1
Totals	0	0	0	0	0	0	8	1

- Most consecutive cuts made – 1 (2024 Open Championship, current)
- Longest streak of top-10s – 0

== Results in World Golf Championships ==
Tournament	2018	2019	2020
Championship	T27		67
Match Play			NT^{1}
Invitational			
Champions	T54	T34	NT^{1}

^{1}Cancelled due to COVID-19 pandemic

Did not play

QF, R16, R32, R64 = Round in which player lost in match play
NT = no tournament
"T" = tied

== Team appearances ==
Amateur

- European Boys' Team Championship (representing Spain): 2003, 2004
- Jacques Léglise Trophy (representing Continental Europe): 2004
- European Amateur Team Championship (representing Spain): 2005, 2007, 2008
- European Youths' Team Championship (representing Spain): 2006 (winners)
- Palmer Cup (representing Europe): 2007, 2008 (winners), 2009 (winners)
- Eisenhower Trophy (representing Spain): 2008
- St Andrews Trophy (representing the Continent of Europe): 2008

Professional

- World Cup (representing Spain): 2018

== See also ==
- 2011 Challenge Tour graduates
- 2023 Race to Dubai dual card winners
