= Qatar Masters =

European Tour golf tournament

Coordinates: 25.384°N 51.507°E

Tournament information
- Location: Doha, Qatar
- Established: 1998
- Course: Doha Golf Club
- Par: 72
- Length: 7,466 yards (6,827 m)
- Tour: European Tour
- Format: Stroke play
- Prize fund: US$2,750,000
- Month played: February

Tournament record score
- Aggregate: 268 Paul Lawrie (1999); 268 Adam Scott (2008)
- To par: −20 as above

Current champion
- (United States) Patrick Reed

Final champion
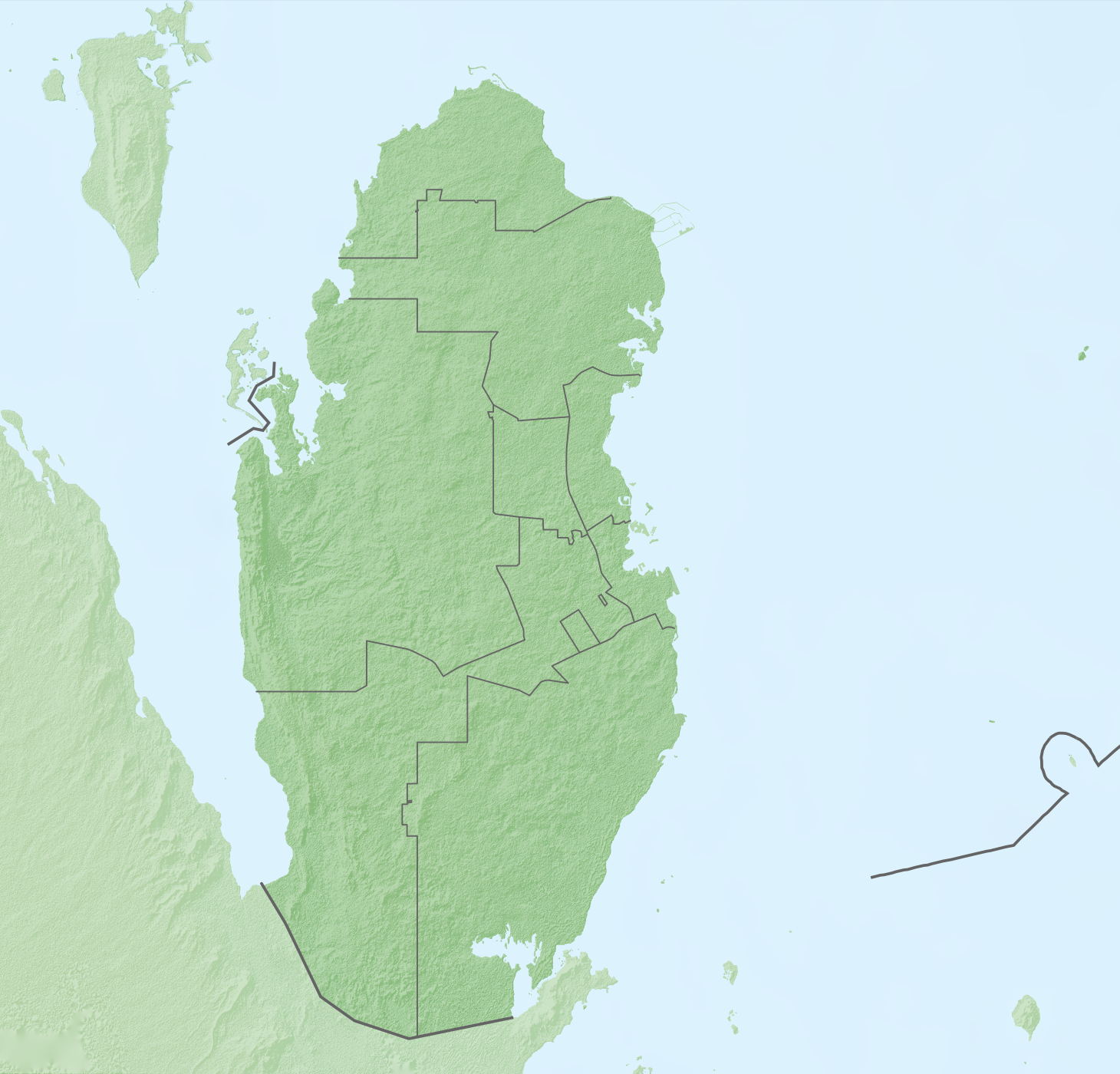
- Location in Qatar

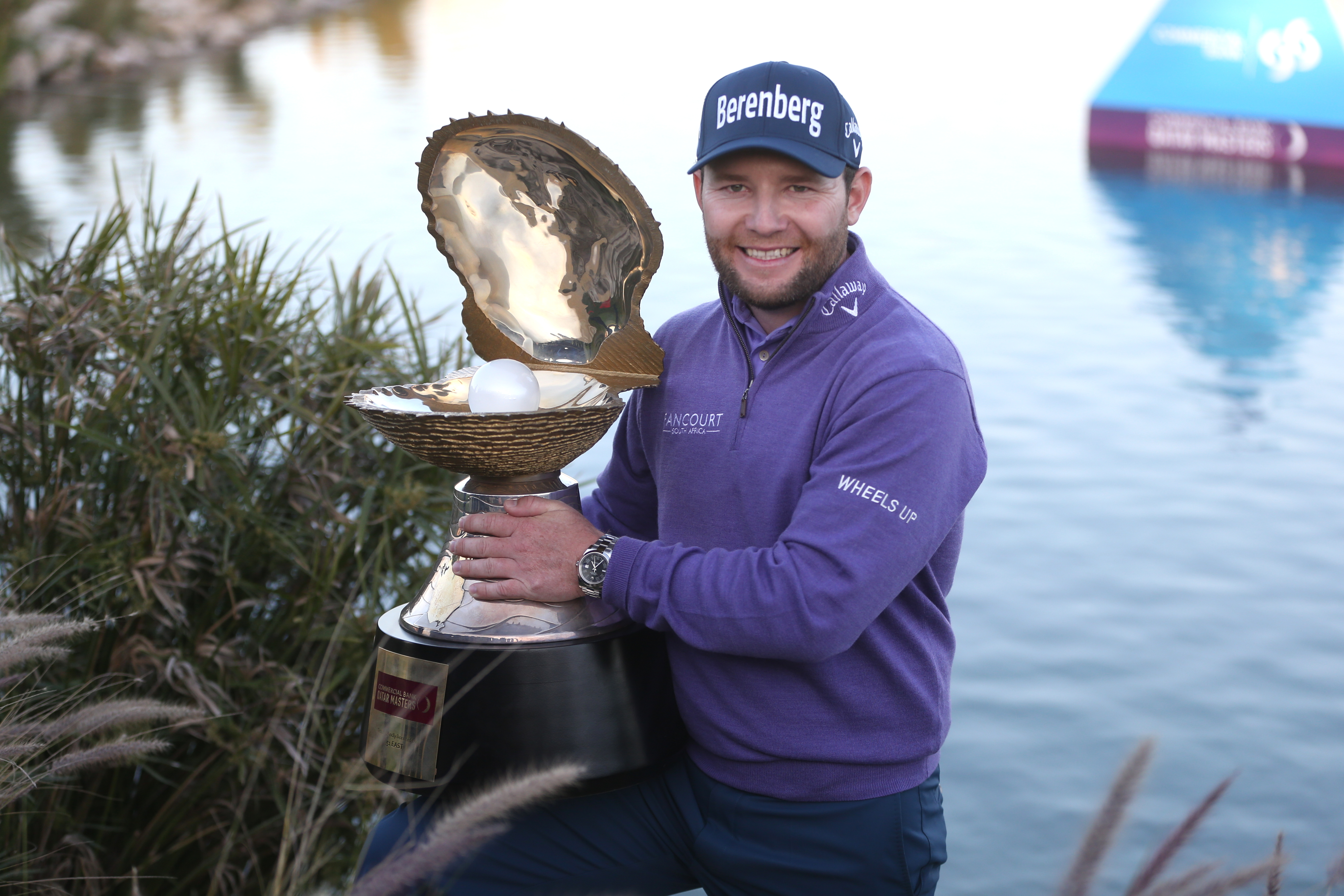
Branden Grace, winner in 2015 and 2016, here posing with the trophy after his second victory.

The Qatar Masters is a European Tour golf tournament held at Doha Golf Club in Doha, Qatar. When founded in 1998, it was one of two European Tour events to be staged in the Arabian Peninsula, but was at one point, one of six. From 2005 to 2007 the tournament was co-sanctioned by the Asian Tour.

The tournament had modest fields in its early years, but with the aid of "promotional" money paid to top golfers to appear, and being scheduled within a three-week period that included events in Dubai and Abu Dhabi, it developed to have one of the European Tour's strongest fields.

In 2018, due to travel restrictions between the United Arab Emirates and Qatar as a result of the ongoing diplomatic dispute in the Arab World, it was moved to later in the year, and is no longer held at the same time as the Abu Dhabi and Dubai events. The date change coincided with a reduction in prize money, and resulted in a lower field strength than previous editions.

== Winners ==
Year	Tour(s) (Note: ASA − Asian Tour; EUR − European Tour.)	Winner	Score	To par	Margin of victory	Runner(s)-up	Venue
Qatar Masters
2026	EUR	(United States) Patrick Reed	272	−16	2 strokes	(Scotland) Calum Hill	Doha
Commercial Bank Qatar Masters
2025	EUR	(China) Li Haotong	272	−16	1 stroke	(Denmark) Rasmus Neergaard-Petersen	Doha
2024	EUR	(Japan) Rikuya Hoshino	274	−14	1 stroke	(France) Ugo Coussaud	Doha
2023	EUR	(Finland) Sami Välimäki	270	−18	Playoff	(Spain) Jorge Campillo	Doha
2022	EUR	(Scotland) Ewen Ferguson	281	−7	1 stroke	(United States) Chase Hanna	Doha
2021	EUR	(France) Antoine Rozner	276	−8	1 stroke	(India) Gaganjeet Bhullar (South Africa) Darren Fichardt (Italy) Guido Migliozzi	Education City
2020	EUR	(Spain) Jorge Campillo	271	−13	Playoff	(Scotland) David Drysdale	Education City
2019	EUR	(South Africa) Justin Harding	275	−13	2 strokes	(South Africa) Christiaan Bezuidenhout (Spain) Jorge Campillo (South Korea) Choi Jin-ho (South Africa) George Coetzee (Spain) Nacho Elvira (Sweden) Anton Karlsson (France) Mike Lorenzo-Vera (South Africa) Erik van Rooyen (England) Oliver Wilson	Doha
2018	EUR	(England) Eddie Pepperell	270	−18	1 stroke	(England) Oliver Fisher	Doha
2017	EUR	(South Korea) Wang Jeung-hun	272	−16	Playoff	(Sweden) Joakim Lagergren (South Africa) Jaco van Zyl	Doha
2016	EUR	(South Africa) Branden Grace (2)	274	−14	2 strokes	(Spain) Rafa Cabrera-Bello (Denmark) Thorbjørn Olesen	Doha
2015	EUR	(South Africa) Branden Grace	269	−19	1 stroke	(Scotland) Marc Warren	Doha
2014	EUR	(Spain) Sergio García	272	−16	Playoff	(Finland) Mikko Ilonen	Doha
2013	EUR	(England) Chris Wood	270	−18	1 stroke	(South Africa) George Coetzee (Spain) Sergio García	Doha
Commercialbank Qatar Masters
2012	EUR	(Scotland) Paul Lawrie (2)	201 (Note: Shortened to 54 holes due to strong winds.)	−15	4 strokes	(Australia) Jason Day (Sweden) Peter Hanson	Doha
2011	EUR	(Denmark) Thomas Bjørn	274	−14	4 strokes	(Spain) Álvaro Quirós	Doha
2010	EUR	(Sweden) Robert Karlsson	273	−15	3 strokes	(Spain) Álvaro Quirós	Doha
2009	EUR	(Spain) Álvaro Quirós	269	−19	3 strokes	(South Africa) Louis Oosthuizen (Sweden) Henrik Stenson	Doha
2008	EUR	(Australia) Adam Scott (2)	268	−20	3 strokes	(Sweden) Henrik Stenson	Doha
2007	ASA, EUR	(South Africa) Retief Goosen	273	−15	1 stroke	(Australia) Nick O'Hern	Doha
2006	ASA, EUR	(Sweden) Henrik Stenson	273	−15	3 strokes	(England) Paul Broadhurst	Doha
Qatar Masters
2005	ASA, EUR	(South Africa) Ernie Els	276	−12	1 stroke	(Sweden) Henrik Stenson	Doha
2004	EUR	(Sweden) Joakim Haeggman	272	−16	1 stroke	(Japan) Nobuhito Sato	Doha
2003	EUR	(South Africa) Darren Fichardt	275	−13	Playoff	(South Africa) James Kingston	Doha
2002	EUR	(Australia) Adam Scott	269	−19	6 strokes	(England) Nick Dougherty (France) Jean-François Remésy	Doha
2001	EUR	(Zimbabwe) Tony Johnstone	274	−14	2 strokes	(Sweden) Robert Karlsson	Doha
2000	EUR	(Netherlands) Rolf Muntz	280	−8	5 strokes	(Wales) Ian Woosnam	Doha
1999	EUR	(Scotland) Paul Lawrie	268	−20	7 strokes	(Denmark) Søren Kjeldsen (Wales) Phillip Price	Doha
1998	EUR	(Scotland) Andrew Coltart	270	−18	2 strokes	(England) Andrew Sherborne (Sweden) Patrik Sjöland	Doha
