= Lo Key =

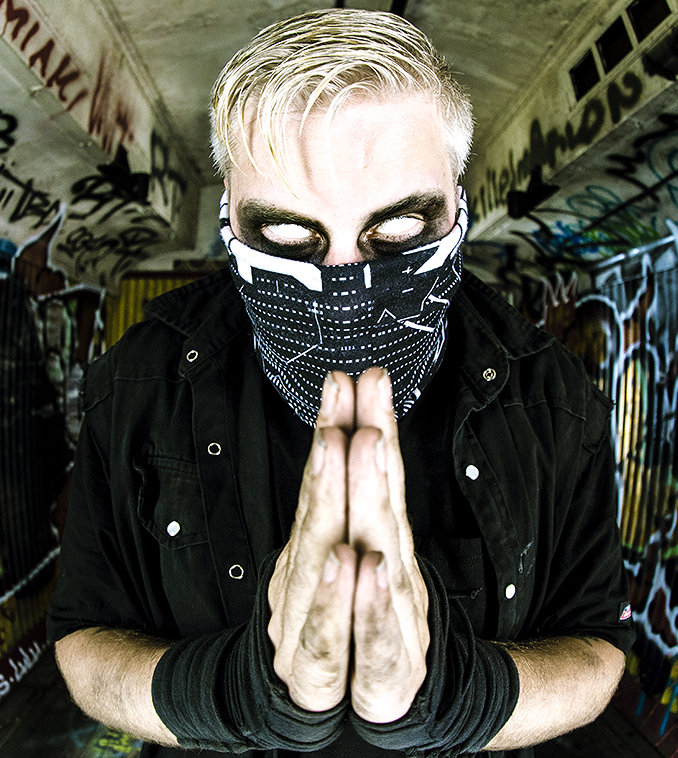
- Lo Key in 2016

Background information
- Born: Jonathan Thomson; July 10, 1984 (age 42); Philadelphia, Pennsylvania, U.S.
- Genres: Hip hop; Horrorcore
- Occupations: Rapper; visual artist; cinematographer
- Years active: 1998–present
- Labels: LOKE RECORDS; Shadowland Entertainment; 7th Seal Ent.
- Website: listentolokey.com

Jonathan Thomson (born July 10, 1984), known professionally by his stage name Lo Key, is an American rapper, vocalist, and creator of music and visual arts. He is the founder of the rap group MISSION : INFECT and mainly recognized for his original mask which is used as a centralized branding for his music. He is a name in horrorcore, a rap subgenre.

== Career ==
Lo Key began his career in metal bands in the late 1990s, but eventually decided to pursue hip hop. In the early 2000s, Lo Key founded the group Temple Rain featuring members Green Vilin and Sleepy. The group released two albums before disbanding in 2004.

In the mid-2000s, he would go on to release several solo albums including Follow Me, The House 1, The House 2, SO-LO, Jack Yo Beatz 1 and Jack Yo Beatz 2. In 2006, Lo Key created the group MISSION : INFECT featuring numerous underground artists including Menacide, Q-Strange, Saint Sinna, BadLuck, Grewsum, T.O.N.E-Z, Malaria, Tha Wikid One, Madd Maxxx, Green Vilin, and more. As a group, they released the projects Chemical Threats 1 & 2, xterM:Ination, and Asphyxiation. Several unofficial mixtapes were also produced.

Lo Key and MISSION : INFECT also performed 4 consecutive years at the Gathering of the Juggalos. Lo Key was also featured on Psychopathic Records 2008 compilation album Tunnel Runners, which debuted at #21 on Billboards Top Rap Albums.

After a short hiatus in 2010, Lo Key would go on to create several more albums, as well as headlining his first national tour - The Lo Key Loves You Tour. In 2016 he released the album Jack Yo Beatz 3, featuring a music video for the song "Nasty", as well as collaborations with Redneck Souljers and The Jokerr.

== Personal life ==
Thomson was born in Philadelphia, Pennsylvania and was adopted. He grew up outside of Philadelphia and in 1999 dropped out of school to pursue a full-time music career.

Lo Key has stated in his music that he suffered from attention deficit disorder (ADD), as well as other mental illnesses. Lo Key has also stated that he suffers from sleep paralysis, which he attributes to the inspiration and creation of his albums Shadowland and The Book of Time.

== Discography ==
=== Solo albums ===
- Follow Me (2005)
- Jack Yo Beatz 1 (2005)
- The House 1 (2005)
- The House Remixes (2005)
- SO-LO (2006)
- Jack Yo Beatz 2 (2006)
- The House 2 (2006)
- RELEASE 1 (2006)
- Chamiliatic (2008)
- RELEASE 2 (2011)
- ShadowLand (2011)
- AMERICAN MONSTER (2012)
- FraggleSwag (2012)
- Chamiliatic Remixes (2012)
- LETS GET VIOLENT! (2013)
- The Book of Time (2014)
- Dedicated (2015)
- Jack Yo Beatz 3 (2016)
- Demon Days (2016)
- Candycorn and Coversongs (2018)
- Nightcrawlers (2019)
- Jack Yo Beatz 4 (2019)
- The Blood of Izu (2020)
- RELEASE 3 (2011)
- Candycorn and Coversongs 2 (2020)
- The Eyes of Parasuva (2020)
- "Metanoia" (2021)
- Portraits of Horror (2023)
- LXVE (2025)

=== Group albums ===
- Temple Rain: The Awakening (2002)
- Temple Rain: The Lost Boys (2004)
- The Devils Rejects: Die 2 This (2004)
- INFECT: Chemical Threads Phase 1 (2007)
- INFECT: Chemical Threats Phase 2 (2007)
- INFECT: Mass Infection (2007)
- Death B4 Dishonor: The Calm B4 the Storm (2007)
- INFECT: XterM:Ination (2008)
- INFECT: Suicide Bombs (2008)
- Death B4 Dishonor: The Ascending (2008)
- INFECT: Annihilation: The Mixtape (2009)
- INFECT: Asphyxiation (2009)
- BunnyJunk: The Final Pawprint (2012)
- INFECT: Chemical Threats Phase 3 (2017)
- INFECT: Chemical Threats Phase 4 (2017)
- INFECT: Chemical Threats Phase X (Bonus Explosions) (2017)
- CABAL: The Watchers (2021)
- Neon Sermon - 001 (2022)
- INFECT: arM:Igeddon (2024)

=== Music videos ===
- "Legacy" (2008)
- "The Devil Tree" (2011)
- "Together" (2011)
- "Transition" (2014)
- "King of Horrorcore" (2015)
- "Nasty" (2016)
- "Dedicated" (2017)
- "GUTTA" (2019)
- "Curse" (2020)
- "Hole In The Sky" (2020)
