= 2024 Swedish Golf Tour =

Golf tour season

2024 Swedish Golf Tour season
- Duration: 16 February 2024 – 10 October 2024
- Number of official events: 15
- Order of Merit: (Sweden) Albin Bergström

The 2024 Swedish Golf Tour, titled as the 2024 Cutter & Buck Tour for sponsorship reasons, was the 41st season of the Swedish Golf Tour, the main professional golf tour in Sweden since it was formed in 1984, with most tournaments being incorporated into the Nordic Golf League since 1999.

== Cutter & Buck title sponsorship ==
In July 2023, it was announced that the tour had signed a title sponsorship agreement with Cutter & Buck, being renamed as the Cutter & Buck Tour.

== Schedule ==
The following table lists official events during the 2024 season.

Date	Tournament	Location	Purse (SKr)	Winner (Note: The number in brackets after each winner's name is the number of Swedish Golf Tour events they had won up to and including that tournament. As most Swedish Golf Tour events are incorporated into the Nordic Golf League schedule, details of these wins are displayed there instead.)	Main tour (Note: NGL − Nordic Golf League.)
18 Feb	GolfStar Winter Series (Links)	Spain	630,000	(Denmark) Victor Sidal Svendsen	NGL
22 Feb	GolfStar Winter Series (Forest)	Spain	630,000	(Sweden) Christofer Rahm	NGL
3 May	Golfkusten Blekinge	Blekinge	500,000	(Sweden) Albin Bergström	NGL
18 May	Stora Hotellet Fjällbacka Open	Bohuslän	500,000	(Sweden) Christofer Rahm	NGL
23 May	Gamle Fredrikstad Open	Norway	470,000	(Denmark) Malthe Tandrup Laustsen	NGL
14 Jun	Greatdays Trophy	Halland	500,000	(Sweden) Sebastian Petersen	NGL
29 Jun	PGA Championship Landeryd Masters	Östergötland	620,000	(Sweden) Jesper Sandborg	NGL
5 Jul	OnTee Grand Prix	Halland	500,000	(Denmark) Christian Jacobsen	NGL
12 Jul	Göteborg Open	Västergötland	500,000	(Sweden) Tobias Ruth	NGL
26 Jul	Holtsmark Open	Norway	470,000	(Norway) Sebastian Eidsæther Syr	NGL
9 Aug	Forsbacka Open	Gästrikland	500,000	(Sweden) Jesper Sandborg	NGL
16 Aug	Skåne Challenge	Skåne	500,000	(Denmark) Victor Sidal Svendsen	NGL
7 Sep	SM Match	Västergötland	450,000	(Sweden) Oliver Gillberg	NGL
27 Sep	Titleist Championship	Västergötland	550,000	(Sweden) Hugo Townsend	NGL
10 Oct	Destination Gotland Open	Skåne	600,000	(Sweden) Anton Karlsson	NGL

== Order of Merit ==
The Order of Merit was titled as the Cutter & Buck Tour Ranking and was based on tournament results during the season, calculated using a points-based system.

Position	Player	Points
1	(Sweden) Albin Bergström	398,875
2	(Sweden) Jesper Sandborg	376,234
3	(Sweden) Oliver Gillberg	238,296
4	(Denmark) Victor Sidal Svendsen	237,005
5	(Sweden) Hugo Townsend	235,165

== See also ==
- 2024 Danish Golf Tour
- 2024 Finnish Tour
- 2024 Swedish Golf Tour (women)
