= 2026 Swedish Golf Tour =

Golf tour season

2026 Swedish Golf Tour season
- Duration: 14 February 2026 – 8 October 2026
- Number of official events: 15
- Order of Merit: (Sweden) David Nyfjäll

The 2026 Swedish Golf Tour, titled as the 2026 Cutter & Buck Tour for sponsorship reasons, was the 43rd season of the Swedish Golf Tour, the main professional golf tour in Sweden since it was formed in 1984, with most tournaments being incorporated into the Nordic Golf League since 1999.

== Schedule ==
The following table lists official events during the 2026 season.

Date	Tournament	Location	Purse (SKr)	Winner (Note: The number in brackets after each winner's name is the number of Swedish Golf Tour events they had won up to and including that tournament. As most Swedish Golf Tour events are incorporated into the Nordic Golf League schedule, details of these wins are displayed there instead.)	Main tour (Note: NGL − Nordic Golf League.)
16 Feb	GolfStar Winter Series Dunes	Spain	580,000	(Sweden) Albin Tidén	NGL
20 Feb	GolfStar Winter Series Forest	Spain	580,000	(Sweden) Martin Eriksson	NGL
1 May	Big Green Egg Blekinge Open	Blekinge	500,000	(Denmark) Martin Simonsen	NGL
14 May	Gamle Fredrikstad Open	Norway	470,000	(Norway) Alexander Settemsdal	NGL
23 May	Cutter & Buck Fjällbacka Open	Bohuslän	530,000	(Sweden) Jesper Sandborg	NGL
12 Jun	Indoor Golf Group Göteborg Open	Västergötland	530,000	(Sweden) Anton Karlsson	NGL
26 Jun	PGA of Sweden Championship	Västergötland	530,000	(Sweden) Per Längfors	NGL
3 Jul	MoreGolf Mastercard Stockholm	Stockholm	530,000	(Sweden) Rasmus Holmberg	NGL
10 Jul	SM Match	Skåne	460,000	(Norway) Sebastian Eidsæther Syr	NGL
23 Jul	Holtsmark Open	Norway	470,000	(Norway) Philip Linberg Bondestad	NGL
8 Aug	NeH Hammarö Open	Värmland	530,000	(Sweden) Johannes Axell	NGL
14 Aug	FootJoy Skåne Challenge	Skåne	530,000	(Sweden) Carl Härdin	NGL
4 Sep	Crona Software Halland Open	Skåne	530,000	(Sweden) David Nyfjäll	NGL
25 Sep	Folksam Championship	Skåne	600,000	(Sweden) Algot Kleén	NGL
8 Oct	Destination Gotland Open	Gotland	600,000	(Sweden) Jesper Sandborg	NGL

== Order of Merit ==
The Order of Merit was titled as the Cutter & Buck Tour Ranking and was based on tournament results during the season, calculated using a points-based system.

Position	Player	Points
1	(Sweden) David Nyfjäll	335,466
2	(Sweden) Jesper Sandborg	297,179
3	(Sweden) David Lundgren	281,332
4	(Sweden) Anton Karlsson	279,632
5	(Sweden) Oliver Lilliedahl	259,408

== See also ==
- 2026 Danish Golf Tour
- 2026 Finnish Tour
- 2026 Swedish Golf Tour (women)
