= 2023 Swedish Golf Tour =

Golf tour season

2023 Swedish Golf Tour season
- Duration: 17 February 2023 – 13 October 2023
- Number of official events: 14 (Note: One further tournament was scheduled but was cancelled.)
- Order of Merit: (Sweden) Björn Åkesson

The 2023 Swedish Golf Tour, titled as the 2023 MoreGolf Mastercard Tour for sponsorship reasons, was the 40th season of the Swedish Golf Tour, the main professional golf tour in Sweden since it was formed in 1984, with most tournaments being incorporated into the Nordic Golf League since 1999.

== Schedule ==
The following table lists official events during the 2023 season.

Date	Tournament	Location	Purse (SKr)	Winner (Note: The number in brackets after each winner's name is the number of Swedish Golf Tour events they had won up to and including that tournament. As most Swedish Golf Tour events are incorporated into the Nordic Golf League schedule, details of these wins are displayed there instead.)	Main tour (Note: NGL − Nordic Golf League.)
19 Feb	GolfStar Winter Series I	Spain	600,000	(Sweden) William Nygård	NGL
23 Feb	GolfStar Winter Series II	Spain	600,000	(Sweden) Christofer Blomstrand	NGL
5 May	Golfkusten Blekinge	Blekinge	470,000	(Sweden) Anton Karlsson	NGL
12 May	Skåne Challenge	Skåne	470,000	(Sweden) Christofer Blomstrand	NGL
18 May	Stora Hotellet Fjällbacka Open	Bohuslän	480,000	(Denmark) Victor Sidal Svendsen	NGL
25 May	Gamle Fredrikstad Open	Norway	470,000	(Sweden) Oliver Gillberg	NGL
16 Jun	Greatdays Trophy	Halland	450,000	(Sweden) Björn Åkesson	NGL
1 Jul	PGA Championship Landeryd Masters	Östergötland	600,000	(Denmark) Peter Launer Bæk	NGL
7 Jul	Arlandastad Trophy	Uppland	470,000	(Sweden) Björn Hellgren	NGL
14 Jul	Big Green Egg Swedish Matchplay Championship	Västergötland	450,000	(Iceland) Axel Bóasson	NGL
27 Jul	Miklagard Open	Norway	470,000	(Denmark) Kristoffer Max	NGL
~~11 Aug~~	Göteborg Open	Västergötland	–	Cancelled (Note: Cancelled due to Storm Hans.)	NGL
9 Sep	Onsjö Open	Västergötland	470,000	(Sweden) Jesper Hagborg Asp	NGL
28 Sep	Destination Gotland Open	Gotland	470,000	(Sweden) Björn Åkesson	NGL
13 Oct	The No. 1 Tour Final in Golf	Skåne	550,000	(Denmark) Jonathan Gøth-Rasmussen	NGL

== Order of Merit ==
The Order of Merit was titled as the MoreGolf Mastercard Tour Ranking and was based on tournament results during the season, calculated using a points-based system.

Position	Player	Points
1	(Sweden) Björn Åkesson	349,913
2	(Sweden) Oliver Gillberg	284,150
3	(Sweden) Per Längfors	270,006
4	(Denmark) Peter Launer Bæk	248,865
5	(Iceland) Axel Bóasson	241,646

== See also ==
- 2023 Danish Golf Tour
- 2023 Finnish Tour
- 2023 Swedish Golf Tour (women)
