= 2025 Swedish Golf Tour =

Golf tour season

2025 Swedish Golf Tour season
- Duration: 14 February 2025 – 9 October 2025
- Number of official events: 15
- Order of Merit: (Sweden) Adam Wallin

The 2025 Swedish Golf Tour, titled as the 2025 Cutter & Buck Tour for sponsorship reasons, was the 42nd season of the Swedish Golf Tour, the main professional golf tour in Sweden since it was formed in 1984, with most tournaments being incorporated into the Nordic Golf League since 1999.

== Schedule ==
The following table lists official events during the 2025 season.

Date	Tournament	Location	Purse (SKr)	Winner (Note: The number in brackets after each winner's name is the number of Swedish Golf Tour events they had won up to and including that tournament. As most Swedish Golf Tour events are incorporated into the Nordic Golf League schedule, details of these wins are displayed there instead.)	Main tour (Note: NGL − Nordic Golf League.)
16 Feb	GolfStar Winter Series (Links)	Spain	620,000	(Sweden) Adam Wallin	NGL
20 Feb	GolfStar Winter Series (Forest)	Spain	620,000	(Denmark) Victor Bjørløw	NGL
2 May	Golfkusten Blekinge	Blekinge	500,000	(Sweden) Erik Tjärnberg (a)	NGL
17 May	Cutter & Buck Fjällbacka Open	Bohuslän	500,000	(Denmark) Morten Ørum Madsen	NGL
22 May	Gamle Fredrikstad Open	Norway	420,000	(Netherlands) Rick Hessing	NGL
13 Jun	Live it Trophy	Uppland	500,000	(Sweden) Jesper Hagborg Asp	NGL
28 Jun	PGA of Sweden Championship Landeryd	Östergötland	600,000	(Sweden) Anton Karlsson	NGL
5 Jul	Enklare att vara proffs	Västergötland	500,000	(Sweden) Adam Wallin	NGL
10 Jul	Skövde Open	Västergötland	500,000	(Sweden) Sebastian Petersen	NGL
24 Jul	Holtsmark Open	Norway	420,000	(Norway) Henric Bjelke	NGL
8 Aug	Forsbacka Open	Gästrikland	500,000	(Iceland) Hlynur Bergsson	NGL
15 Aug	Skåne Challenge	Skåne	500,000	(Sweden) Adam Wallin	NGL
6 Sep	SM Match	Skåne	450,000	(Netherlands) Thom Hoetmer	NGL
26 Sep	FootJoy Championship	Skåne	550,000	(Sweden) Tobias Edén	NGL
9 Oct	Destination Gotland Open	Gotland	600,000	(Sweden) Adam Wallin	NGL

== Order of Merit ==
The Order of Merit was titled as the Cutter & Buck Tour Ranking and was based on tournament results during the season, calculated using a points-based system.

Position	Player	Points
1	(Sweden) Adam Wallin	607,936
2	(Sweden) Tobias Edén	346,472
3	(Sweden) Jesper Hagborg Asp	241,928
4	(Sweden) Sebastian Petersen	235,988
5	(Norway) Tom Røed Karlsen	195,289

== See also ==
- 2025 Danish Golf Tour
- 2025 Finnish Tour
- 2025 Swedish Golf Tour (women)
