= 2017 Swedish Golf Tour =

Golf tour season

2017 Swedish Golf Tour season
- Duration: 25 February 2017 – 14 October 2017
- Number of official events: 16
- Order of Merit: (Iceland) Axel Bóasson

The 2017 Swedish Golf Tour was the 34th season of the Swedish Golf Tour, the main professional golf tour in Sweden since it was formed in 1984, with most tournaments being incorporated into the Nordic Golf League since 1999.

== Schedule ==
The following table lists official events during the 2017 season.

Date	Tournament	Location	Purse (SKr)	Winner (Note: The number in brackets after each winner's name is the number of Swedish Golf Tour events they had won up to and including that tournament. As most Swedish Golf Tour events are incorporated into the Nordic Golf League schedule, details of these wins are displayed there instead.)	Main tour (Note: NGL − Nordic Golf League.)
27 Feb	Lumine Lakes Open	Spain	€55,000	(Sweden) Mikael Lundberg	NGL
4 Mar	Lumine Hills Open	Spain	€55,000	(Sweden) Oscar Lengdén	NGL
5 May	Bravo Tours Open	Denmark	DKr 300,000	(England) Alex Wrigley	NGL
20 May	Stora Hotellet Bryggan Fjällbacka Open	Bohuslän	400,000	(Norway) Elias Bertheussen	NGL
26 May	Star for Life PGA Championship	Skåne	400,000	(Sweden) Niklas Lemke	NGL
22 Jun	Borre Open	Norway	350,000	(Sweden) Per Längfors	NGL
1 Jul	SM Match	Uppland	400,000	(Iceland) Axel Bóasson	NGL
8 Jul	Lannalodge Open	Närke	400,000	(Finland) Antti Ahokas	NGL
28 Jul	Gamle Fredrikstad Open	Norway	350,000	(Sweden) Daniel Jennevret	NGL
4 Aug	Made in Denmark Qualifier	Denmark	DKr 300,000	(Sweden) Åke Nilsson	NGL
12 Aug	Isaberg Open	Småland	350,000	(Sweden) Anton Wejshag	NGL
27 Aug	Landeryd Masters	Östergötland	400,000	(Sweden) Daniel Jennevret	NGL
22 Sep	12 Twelve Championship	Denmark	DKr 300,000	(Iceland) Axel Bóasson	NGL
30 Sep	GolfUppsala Open	Uppland	400,000	(Finland) Lauri Ruuska	NGL
7 Oct	Race to HimmerLand	Denmark	DKr 375,000	(Sweden) Ludwig Nordeklint	NGL
14 Oct	SGT Tourfinal Kristianstad Åhus Open	Skåne	450,000	(Sweden) Niklas Lemke	NGL

== Order of Merit ==
The Order of Merit was based on tournament results during the season, calculated using a points-based system.

Position	Player	Points
1	(Iceland) Axel Bóasson	337,934
2	(Sweden) Niklas Lemke	246,957
3	(Sweden) Anton Wejshag	211,003
4	(Sweden) Åke Nilsson	195,306
5	(Sweden) Christopher Feldborg Nielsen	193,023

== See also ==
- 2017 Danish Golf Tour
- 2017 Swedish Golf Tour (women)
