= 2026 European Tour Qualifying School graduates =

Golf qualifying tournament in Spain

2026 European Tour Qualifying School Final Stage
Tournament information
- Dates: 6–11 November 2024
- Location: Tarragona, Spain; 41.0798°N 1.1615°E
- Courses: Infinitum Golf (Lakes & Hills Courses)
- Tours: European Tour (unofficial event)

Statistics
- Par: 71 (L); 72 (H)
- Length: 7,001 yards (6,402 m) (L); 6,976 yards (6,379 m) (H)
- Field: 156, 66 after cut
- Cut: 276 (−10)
- Prize fund: €120,000
- Winner's share: €5,000

Champion
- (Spain) Rocco Repetto
- 396 (−32)
- Location in Spain Location in Catalonia

The 2026 European Tour Qualifying School graduates were determined following the conclusion of the 2026 European Tour (DP World Tour) Qualifying School Final Stage which was played 6–11 November at Infinitum Golf in Tarragona, Spain. It was the 49th edition of the European Tour Qualifying School. The top 15 and ties (20 in total) earned status to play on the 2027 European Tour, with the remaining players who finished outside the top 15 and ties, but having made the 72-hole cut, earning status to play on the 2027 Challenge Tour.

== Results ==
The top 15 players (including ties) earned status to play on the 2027 European Tour. They were as follows:

Place	Player	Score	To par
1	(Spain) Rocco Repetto	68-66-66-64-67-65=396	−32
2	(Spain) Josele Ballester	66-64-66-67-68-65=396	−32
3	(Australia) Cameron John	68-65-66-66-66-66=397	−31
T4	(Spain) Iván Cantero	69-69-68-61-67-64=398	−30
T4	(England) Tom Lewis	67-68-65-67-63-68=398	−30
T6	(Sweden) Adam Blommé	70-71-65-64-65-64=399	−29
T6	(Sweden) David Nyfjäll	66-66-72-64-65-66=399	−29
T8	(South Korea) An Byeong-hun	68-65-68-65-68-66=400	−28
T8	(France) Paul Beauvy	67-65-69-66-64-69=400	−28
T8	(Germany) Jannik de Bruyn	67-68-67-70-61-67=400	−28
T8	(Denmark) Marcus Helligkilde	67-65-64-67-67-70=400	−28
T8	(Scotland) Ryan Lumsden	68-68-67-61-68-68=400	−28
13	(Sweden) Albin Bergström	66-67-66-67-67-69=402	−26
T14	(United States) John Catlin	67-68-70-68-67-63=403	−25
T14	(Italy) Matteo Cristoni	65-68-67-62-71-70=403	−25
T14	(Germany) Philipp Katich	68-69-71-67-66-62=403	−25
T14	(Sweden) Niklas Lemke	67-69-70-66-67-64=403	−25
T14	(Italy) Edoardo Molinari	67-65-71-67-66-67=403	−25
T14	(United States) Jansen Preston	67-67-69-68-64-68=403	−25
T14	(England) Ben Schmidt	69-69-64-68-67-66=403	−25

The following players made the 72 hole cut, however finished outside the top 15 and ties, therefore earning status to play on the 2027 Challenge Tour.

- (Australia) Jack Buchanan (T21)
- (United States) Joshua Lee (T21)
- (Sweden) David Lundgren (T21)
- (Germany) Thomas Schmidt (T21)
- (Norway) Bård Skogen (T21)
- (Paraguay) Fabrizio Zanotti (T21)
- (Pakistan) Ahmad Baig (T27)
- (Austria) Lukas Boandl (T27)
- (Sweden) Oliver Lilliedahl (T27)
- (Germany) Philipp Macionga (T27)
- (Sweden) Jesper Sandborg (T27)
- (Australia) Haydn Barron (T32)
- (United States) Jhared Hack (T32)
- (Argentina) Segundo Oliva Pinto (a) (T32)
- (South Africa) Pieter Moolman (T32)
- (Australia) Elvis Smylie (T32)
- (Sweden) Hugo Townsend (T32)
- (Scotland) Cameron Adam (T38)
- (England) Charlie Forster (T38)
- (United States) Dean Greyserman (a) (T38)
- (Netherlands) Lars van Meijel (T38)
- (Spain) Quim Vidal (T38)
- (South Africa) Ian Snyman (T38)
- (France) Louis Bonté (T45)
- (Switzerland) Ronan Kleu (T45)
- (South Africa) Zander Lombard (T45)
- (Germany) Martin Obtmeier (T45)
- (Belgium) Thomas Pieters (T45)
- (Slovakia) Tadeáš Teťák (T45)
- (Australia) Kevin Yuan (T45)
- (England) Jack Yule (T45)
- (France) Julien Brun (T53)
- (Netherlands) Jerry Ji (T53)
- (Spain) Pablo Larrazábal (T53)
- (Italy) Renato Paratore (T53)
- (England) George Bloor (T57)
- (Republic of Ireland) Niall Kearney (T57)
- (England) Dale Whitnell (T57)
- (South Africa) Bryce Easton (T60)
- (Spain) Luis Masaveu (T60)
- (Spain) Joseba Torres (T60)
- (France) Alexandre Vandermoten (63)
- (South Africa) Wilco Nienaber (T64)
- (England) Max Orrin (T64)
- (France) Antoine Pouguet (66)

== Graduates ==
Place	Player	Career ET starts	Cuts made	Best finish
1	(Spain) Rocco Repetto	27	12	T23
2	(Spain) Josele Ballester	14	6	T6
3	(Australia) Cameron John	19	10	T20
4	(Spain) Iván Cantero	122	50	T3
4	(England) Tom Lewis	251	144	Win (x2)
6	(Sweden) Adam Blommé	24	8	T17
6	(Sweden) David Nyfjäll (Note: European Tour rookie in 2026)	3	1	T47
8	(South Korea) An Byeong-hun	111	81	Win (x2)
8	(France) Paul Beauvy	1	0	CUT
8	(Germany) Jannik de Bruyn	50	26	T3
8	(Scotland) Ryan Lumsden	9	4	T19
8	(Denmark) Marcus Helligkilde	74	48	2nd
13	(Sweden) Albin Bergström	26	9	T11
14	(United States) John Catlin	134	76	Win (x3)
14	(Italy) Matteo Cristoni	1	1	T11
14	(Germany) Philipp Katich	5	2	T17
14	(Sweden) Niklas Lemke	170	84	3rd/T3
14	(Italy) Edoardo Molinari	448	261	Win (x3)
14	(United States) Jansen Preston	1	0	CUT
14	(England) Ben Schmidt	57	25	3rd

== See also ==
- 2026 Challenge Tour graduates
