= 2023 Nordic Golf League =

Golf tour season

2023 Nordic Golf League season
- Duration: 17 February 2023 – 20 October 2023
- Number of official events: 30 (Note: One further tournament was scheduled but was cancelled.)
- Most wins: (Sweden) Björn Åkesson (3) (Sweden) Charlie Lindh (3)
- Order of Merit: (Sweden) Björn Åkesson

The 2023 Nordic Golf League was the 25th season of the Nordic Golf League, a third-tier tour recognised by the European Tour.

== Schedule ==
The following table lists official events during the 2023 season.

| Date | Tournament | Host country | Purse | Winner (Note: The number in brackets after each winner's name is the number of Nordic Golf League events they had won up to and including that tournament. It is rare for someone to accumulate many wins on the Nordic Golf League as success at this level usually leads to promotion to the Challenge Tour.) | OWGR points |
|---|---|---|---|---|---|
| 19 Feb | GolfStar Winter Series I | Spain | SKr 600,000 | (Sweden) William Nygård (2) | 1.01 |
| 23 Feb | GolfStar Winter Series II | Spain | SKr 600,000 | (Sweden) Christofer Blomstrand (2) | 1.21 |
| 28 Feb | ECCO Tour Spanish Masters | Spain | €50,000 | (Sweden) Joakim Wikström (5) | 1.42 |
| 4 Mar | Camiral Golf & Wellness Championship | Spain | €50,000 | (Norway) Jarand Ekeland Arnøy (3) | 1.42 |
| 11 Apr | Sand Valley Polish Masters | Poland | €50,000 | (Norway) Andreas Halvorsen (1) | 1.21 |
| 15 Apr | Gebwell Championship | Poland | €50,000 | (Sweden) Charlie Lindh (1) | 1.23 |
| 19 Apr | Sand Valley Spring Series Final | Poland | €50,000 | (Norway) Andreas Halvorsen (2) | 1.19 |
| 28 Apr | Bravo Tours Open | Denmark | €40,000 | (Sweden) Charlie Lindh (2) | 0.56 |
| 5 May | Golfkusten Blekinge | Sweden | SKr 470,000 | (Sweden) Anton Karlsson (1) | 1.11 |
| 12 May | Skåne Challenge | Sweden | SKr 470,000 | (Sweden) Christofer Blomstrand (3) | 1.33 |
| 18 May | Stora Hotellet Fjällbacka Open | Sweden | SKr 480,000 | (Denmark) Victor Sidal Svendsen (1) | 1.07 |
| 25 May | Gamle Fredrikstad Open | Sweden | SKr 470,000 | (Sweden) Oliver Gillberg (3) | 0.63 |
| 2 Jun | UNICEF Championship | Denmark | €40,000 | (Sweden) Björn Åkesson (2) | 0.91 |
| 9 Jun | Thomas Bjørn Samsø Classic | Denmark | €30,000 | (Denmark) Sebastian Wiis (1) | 0.57 |
| 16 Jun | Greatdays Trophy | Sweden | SKr 450,000 | (Sweden) Björn Åkesson (3) | 0.90 |
| 1 Jul | PGA Championship Landeryd Masters | Sweden | SKr 600,000 | (Denmark) Peter Launer Bæk (3) | 1.15 |
| 7 Jul | Arlandastad Trophy | Sweden | SKr 470,000 | (Sweden) Björn Hellgren (4) | 0.85 |
| 14 Jul | Big Green Egg Swedish Matchplay Championship | Sweden | SKr 450,000 | (Iceland) Axel Bóasson (4) | 0.63 |
| 28 Jul | Miklagard Open | Sweden | SKr 470,000 | (Denmark) Kristoffer Max (1) | 0.75 |
| 4 Aug | BWT Championship | Denmark | €40,000 | (Denmark) Morten Toft Hansen (2) | 0.77 |
| ~~11 Aug~~ | Göteborg Open | Sweden | – | Cancelled (Note: Cancelled due to Storm Hans.) | – |
| 18 Aug | Esbjerg Open | Denmark | €35,000 | (Denmark) Alexander George Frances (1) | 0.66 |
| 27 Aug | Timberwise Finnish Open | Finland | €50,000 | (Finland) Rasmus Karlsson (1) | 0.85 |
| 1 Sep | Nordcenter Fream Extreme | Finland | €50,000 | (Norway) Jarand Ekeland Arnøy (4) | 0.94 |
| 9 Sep | Onsjö Open | Sweden | SKr 470,000 | (Sweden) Jasper Hagborg Asp (2) | 0.90 |
| 15 Sep | Trust Forsikring Championship | Denmark | €35,000 | (Denmark) Alexander George Frances (2) | 0.86 |
| 21 Sep | Great Northern Challenge | Denmark | DKr 500,000 | (Sweden) Adam Andersson (2) | 1.18 |
| 28 Sep | Destination Gotland Open | Sweden | SKr 470,000 | (Sweden) Björn Åkesson (4) | 0.78 |
| 6 Oct | Aarhus Alliance | Denmark | €40,000 | (Sweden) Charlie Lindh (3) | 0.99 |
| 13 Oct | The No. 1 Tour Final in Golf | Sweden | SKr 550,000 | (Denmark) Jonathan Gøth-Rasmussen (1) | 0.96 |
| 20 Oct | Road to Europe Final | Denmark | €35,000 | (Sweden) Adam Andersson (3) | 0.76 |

== Order of Merit ==
The Order of Merit was titled as the GolfBox Road to Europe and was based on tournament results during the season, calculated using a points-based system. The top five players on the Order of Merit earned status to play on the 2024 Challenge Tour.

| Position | Player | Points | Status earned |
|---|---|---|---|
| 1 | (Sweden) Björn Åkesson | 61,884 | Promoted to Challenge Tour |
| 2 | (Sweden) Charlie Lindh | 59,098 | Promoted to Challenge Tour |
| 3 | (Sweden) Per Längfors | 43,007 | Promoted to Challenge Tour |
| 4 | (Norway) Andreas Halvorsen | 41,434 | Promoted to Challenge Tour |
| 5 | (Iceland) Axel Bóasson | 41,250 | Promoted to Challenge Tour |
| 6 | (Sweden) Oliver Gillberg | 38,260 | |
| 7 | (Denmark) Alexander George Frances | 37,379 | |
| 8 | (Finland) Matias Honkala | 36,748 | |
| 9 | (Sweden) Adam Andersson | 36,293 | |
| 10 | (Denmark) Peter Launer Bæk | 36,272 | |

== See also ==
- 2023 Danish Golf Tour
- 2023 Finnish Tour
- 2023 Swedish Golf Tour
