= Björn Åkesson =

Swedish professional golfer

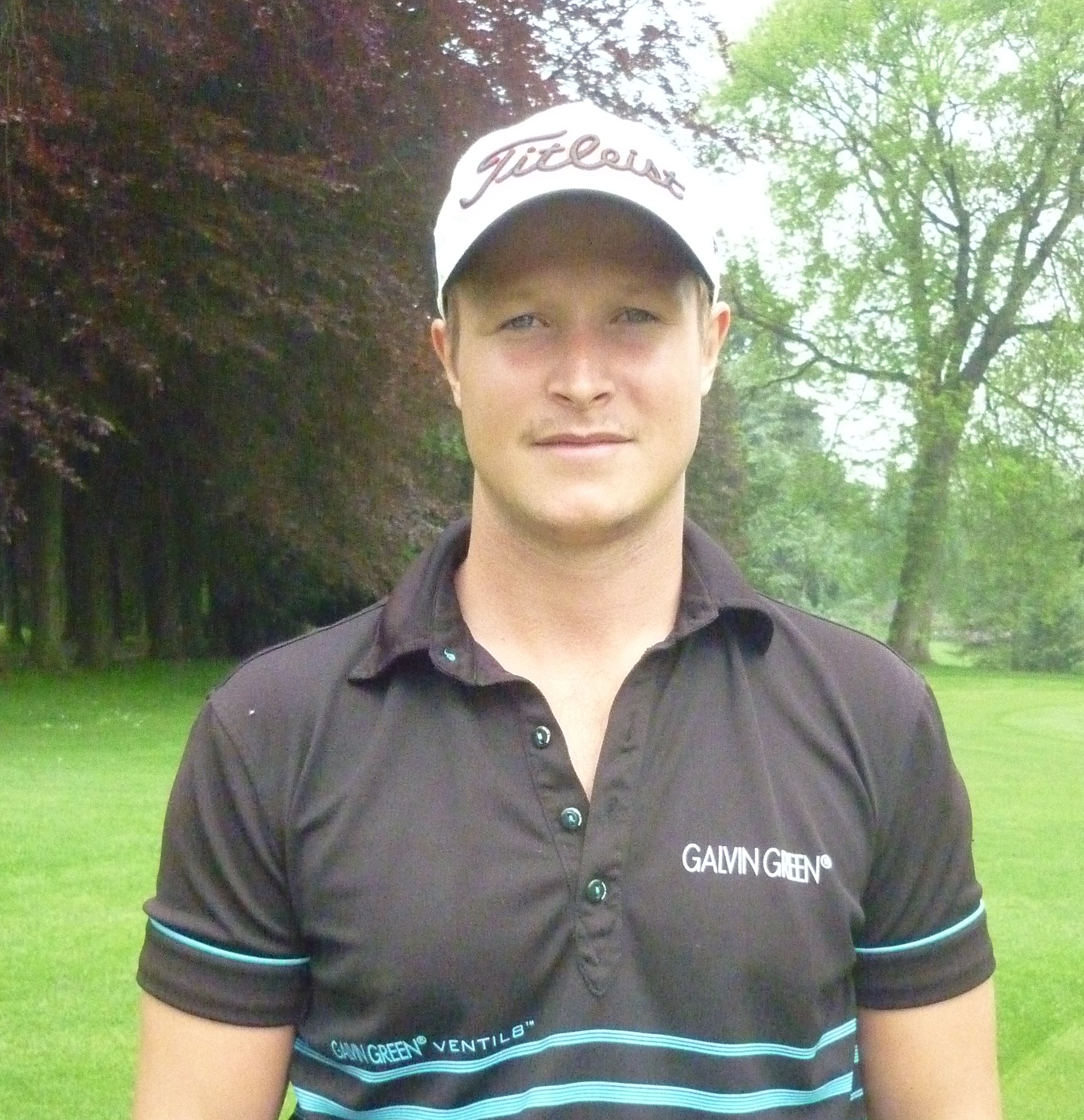
- Åkesson in 2012

Personal information
- Full name: Björn Oskar Ingemar Åkesson
- Nationality: Sweden
- Born: 4 January 1989 (age 37) Malmö, Sweden
- Height: 1.80 m (5 ft 11 in)
- Weight: 76 kg (168 lb; 12.0 st)

Career
- Sport: Golf
- Turned professional: 2009
- Current tour: European Tour
- Former tours: Challenge Tour; Nordic Golf League
- Professional wins: 5

Number of wins by tour
- Sunshine Tour: 1
- Challenge Tour: 1
- Other: 4

Achievements and awards
- Swedish Golf Tour Order of Merit winner: 2023
- Nordic Golf League Order of Merit winner: 2023

Björn Oskar Ingemar Åkesson (born 4 January 1989) is a Swedish professional golfer that has played on the European Tour. He won the 2023 Nordic Golf League Order of Merit and the 2024 NMB Championship in South Africa.

== Amateur career ==
Åkesson had a successful youth career and played for the Swedish National Team from the age of 15. In 2006, he was runner-up at the Boys Amateur Championship and became the youngest ever winner of the Duncan Putter at Southerndown Golf Club in Wales, until the event was won by 15-year-old Tim Harry in 2013.

In 2007, he won the Polo Golf Junior Classic at the Reunion Resort in the United States. He won the Junior Golf World Cup in Japan together with Jesper Kennegård, Daniel Jennevret and Pontus Widegren, finishing in on the podium individually.

Åkesson made his debut on the European Tour in 2006 after winning the amateur qualifying tournament for the EnterCard Scandinavian Masters.

He played for the European teams in the Jacques Léglise Trophy, St Andrews Trophy and the Bonallack Trophy at Valderrama Golf Club, where he won two points in foursomes against Danny Lee.

== Professional career ==
Åkesson turned professional in 2009 and joined the Nordic Golf League In 2010, he secured his maiden title at the Gefle Open and finished 2nd in the season rankings to earn promotion to the Challenge Tour.

On the 2011 Challenge Tour Åkesson tied for 3rd at the Kärnten Golf Open in Austria. He finished ranked 54th in 2011 and 35th in 2012. At the end of 2012, he earned his European Tour card through Q School.

In 2013, his rookie European Tour season, his best finish was a 5th place at the Tshwane Open in South Africa and he finished 143rd in the ranking.

Åkesson spent 2014 and 2015 on the Challenge Tour. In 2014, he recorded four top-6 finishes and in 2015 he was tied 3rd at the Turkish Airlines Challenge and finished runner-up at the Foshan Open in China, two strokes behind winner Borja Virto of Spain, after finding water on the final hole. He finished 6th in the season ranking and earned promotion to the 2016 European Tour. He enjoyed had a good start to 2016 with a tie for third place in the Joburg Open at Royal Johannesburg & Kensington Golf Club in South Africa, his career best finish on the European Tour.

Åkesson took a break from touring in 2017 to become a teaching pro. In 2023, he staged a comeback in earnest and won three tournaments to top the 2023 Nordic Golf League Order of Merit. On his return to the Challenge Tour in 2024, he won the NMB Championship a stroke ahead of England's Lee Slattery.

== Amateur wins ==
- 2006 Duncan Putter
- 2007 TourGolf Open, Polo Golf Junior Classic

== Professional wins (5) ==
=== Challenge Tour wins (1) ===
No.	Date	Tournament	Winning score	Margin of victory	Runner-up
1	25 Feb 2024	NMB Championship^{1}	−18 (63-67-68=198) (Note: Shortened to 54 holes due to weather.)	1 stroke	(England) Lee Slattery

^{1}Co-sanctioned by the Sunshine Tour

=== Nordic Golf League wins (4) ===
No.	Date	Tournament	Winning score	Margin of victory	Runner(s)-up
1	7 Aug 2010	Gefle Open	−15 (63-69-69=201)	4 strokes	(Sweden) Benny Ahlenbäck, (Sweden) Peter Hedblom
2	2 Jun 2023	UNICEF Championship	−3 (69-73-71=213)	1 stroke	(Denmark) Jonathan Gøth-Rasmussen, (Norway) Andreas Halvorsen, (Sweden) Per Längfors
3	16 Jun 2023	Greatdays Trophy	−14 (70-64-62=196)	Playoff	(Denmark) Jonathan Gøth-Rasmussen
4	28 Sep 2023	Destination Gotland Open	−15 (65-66-65=195)	2 strokes	(Sweden) Per Längfors

== Team appearances ==
Amateur

- European Boys' Team Championship (representing Sweden): 2005, 2006
- Eisenhower Trophy (representing Sweden): 2006
- Jacques Léglise Trophy (representing the Continent of Europe): 2006 (winners)
- European Amateur Team Championship (representing Sweden): 2007, 2008
- Junior Golf World Cup (representing Sweden): 2007 (winners)
- Bonallack Trophy (representing Europe): 2008 (winners)
- St Andrews Trophy (representing the Continent of Europe): 2008

== See also ==
- 2012 European Tour Qualifying School graduates
- 2015 Challenge Tour graduates
- 2024 Challenge Tour graduates
