= PGA Sweden National =

Golf course in Bara, Sweden

Coordinates: 55.5665°N 13.1835°E

The National
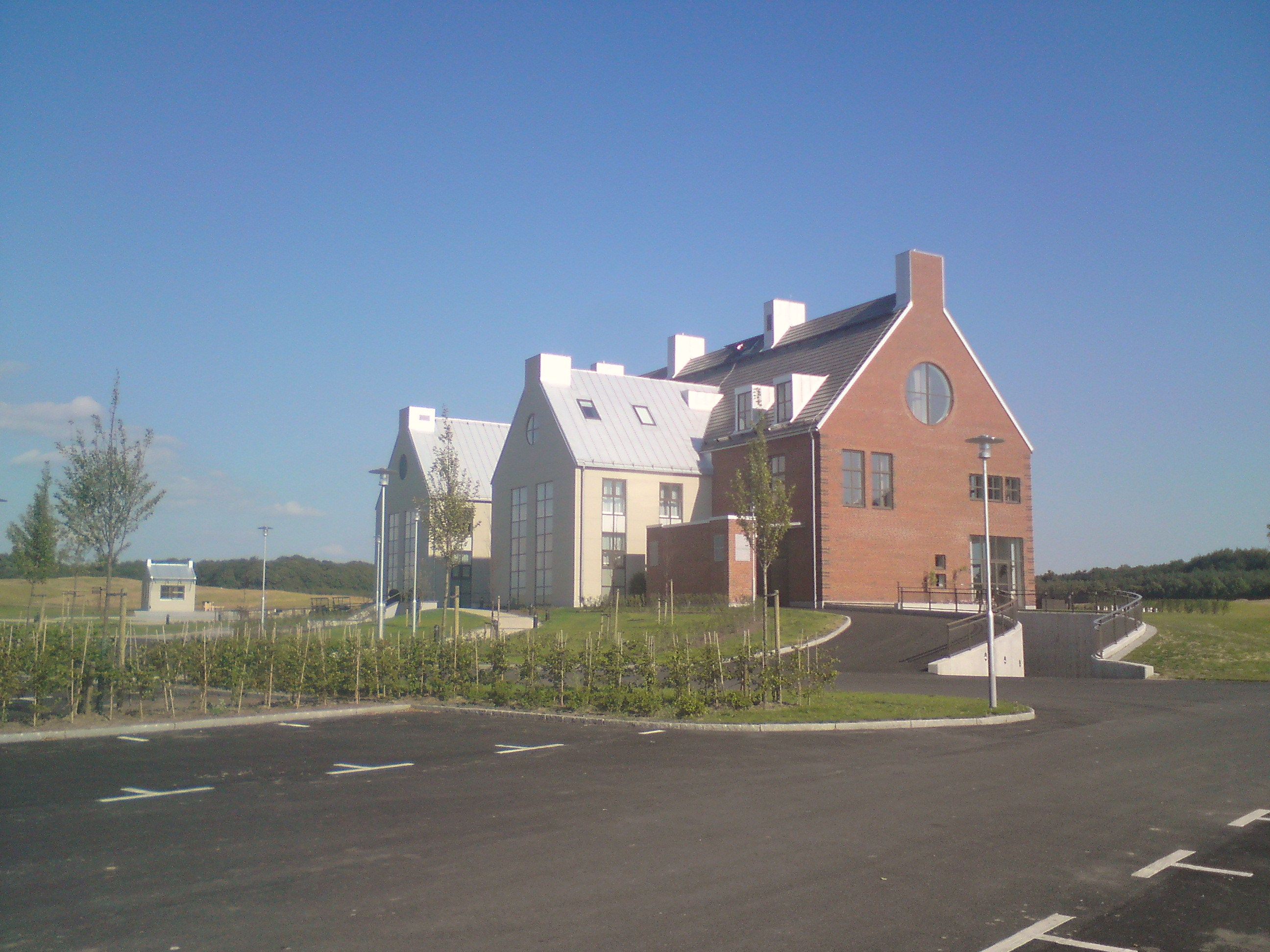

- Location in Sweden

Club information
- Location: Bara, Skåne County, Sweden
- Established: 2009
- Type: Public
- Total holes: 45
- Tournaments: Scandinavian Masters; The Princess; Swedish PGA Championship
- Website: thenational.se

Lakes Course
- Designed by: Kyle Phillips
- Par: 72
- Length: 6,781 m (7,416 yd)

Links Course
- Designed by: Kyle Phillips
- Par: 72
- Length: 6,835 m (7,475 yd)

Academy Course
- Designed by: Kyle Phillips
- Par: 27
- Length: 1,191 m (1,302 yd)

The National, formerly the PGA of Sweden National, is a golf resort in Bara around 10 km (6.2 mi) east of central Malmö and about 40 km (25 mi) east of Copenhagen. The resort consists of two 18-hole courses, one 9-hole par-3 course as well as hotel, restaurant and a pro shop. It has been named the best Swedish golf club in three consecutive years since 2012 by both members and guests in Golf's survey among 80 Swedish golf courses

== Operator ==
A company, PGA of Sweden National AB (Professional Golfers' Association of Sweden National Aktiebolag), runs the resort and is a Swedish Joint-stock company with headquarters in Ängelholm, Scania in the southern part of Sweden. The company was founded in 2000 (26 years ago) by Jan Patric Wester, with the CEO until 2016 being the former European Tour professional, Ove Sellberg.

== History ==
The idea of PGA Sweden National started already in 1996, but due to difficulties with local governments, the first course did not open to the public until 2009. Both courses are designed by Kyle Phillips, a golf course architect also known for Yas Links in Abu Dhabi and Kingsbarns Golf Links in Scotland.

In November 2014, it was announced that Henrik Stenson has bought a significant amount of shares in the company, with the project becoming his first investment in golf resorts. At the same time, plans were announced to expand the resort to include both leisure houses and a new hotel on site.

On July 1, 2023 the resort formally changed its name from "PGA of Sweden National", commonly referred to as "PGA National", to "The National".

== Golf courses ==
=== Lakes Course ===
Lakes Course were officially opened to the public on June 29, 2010. It is an open course with water in play on many holes as well as 74 bunkers across the 18 holes. During Nordea Masters, the course measures 6,756 m (22,165 ft), par 72. Under normal conditions, players can choose between seven tee boxes making the course range from 4,840 to 6,781 m (5,293 to 7,416 yd).

=== Links Course ===
Links Course is the second 18-hole course on PGA Sweden National. It is also a par 72 course, ranging between 6,835 m (7,475 yd) from the back tees to 4,950 m (16,240 ft) from the front tees. It is inspired by the Scottish links-style golf with many pot bunkers and its undulated greens.

=== Academy Course ===
The 9-hole academy course is open to play for everyone. It measures 1,191 m (1,302 yd), par 27, with holes ranging between 116 and 151 m (381 and 495 ft). It is also designed by Kyle Phillips.

== PGA Golf Academy ==
PGA Sweden National has a golf academy connected to the golf course, led by Scotland-born PGA Professional John Grant, father of Linn Grant. The practice area consists of a driving range with 7,000 m^{2} (75,000 ft^{2}), grass tees as well as six target greens. It also boasts the only TaylorMade Performance Lab in Scandinavia.

== Tournaments hosted ==
=== Notable tournaments hosted ===
In 2011, the Challenge Tour tournament The Princess was played at Lakes Course, with Ricardo Santos winning.

In June 2014, Lakes Course hosted the European Tour tournament Nordea Masters, with Thailand's Thongchai Jaidee taking home the trophy. It hosted the tournament again in 2015 with Alex Norén champion.

=== Professional tournaments ===
Year	Tour	Championship	Winner
2009	NGL	PEAB PGA Open	(Sweden) Alexander Björk
2010	NGL	PGA of Sweden National Open	(Sweden) Magnus Persson Atlevi
2011	CHA	The Princess	(Portugal) Ricardo Santos
2014	EUR	Nordea Masters	(Thailand) Thongchai Jaidee
2015	EUR	Nordea Masters	(Sweden) Alex Norén
2017	LETAS	Forget Foundation PGA Championship	(France) Valentine Derrey
2017	NGL	Star for Life PGA Championship	(Sweden) Niklas Lemke
2021	NGL	MoreGolf Mastercard Tour Final	(Sweden) Sebastian Petersen
2022	NGL	MoreGolf Mastercard Tour Final	(Denmark) John Axelsen

=== Amateur tournaments ===
Year	Org.	Championship	Winner
2017	EGA	European Senior Men's Team Championship	Ireland
