= Algot Kleén =

Swedish professional golfer (born 2002)

Personal information
- Full name: Algot Humpe Kleén
- Nationality: Sweden
- Born: 18 June 2002 (age 24) Fiskebäckskil, Sweden
- Height: 5 ft 9 in (175 cm)

Career
- Sport: Golf
- College: East Tennessee State University; Louisiana State University
- Turned professional: 2025
- Current tour: Nordic Golf League
- Former tour: Korn Ferry Tour
- Professional wins: 1

Achievements and awards
- Southern Conference Freshman of the Year: 2022
- Southeastern Conference Newcomer of the Year: 2025

Algot Kleén (born 18 June 2002) is a Swedish professional golfer. He was part of the Swedish team winning the 2024 European Amateur Team Championship.

== Early life ==
Kleén plays out of Skaftö Golf Club in Fiskebäckskil, on the small Swedish west coast island Skaftö with 1,400 inhabitants. His coach was Mikael Kinhult, father of professional golfers Marcus Kinhult and Frida Kinhult.

== Amateur career ==
Kleén joined the Swedish national team and was part of the Swedish team earning bronze at the 2019 European Boys' Team Championship at Golf de Chantilly in France where Sweden won the bronze game against Ireland 4–3 after Kleen beat Max Kennedy 6 and 5. He was on the winning 2024 European Amateur Team Championship team in Italy, with Sweden beating the Netherlands 3–2 in the final.

Individually, he was runner-up at the Swedish Junior Strokeplay Championship in 2019 and 2021, and lost a playoff for the 2021 Katrineholm Open, a Nordic Golf League event.

Kleén attended East Tennessee State University from 2021 to 2024, and played with the East Tennessee State Buccaneers men's golf team, where he was Southern Conference Freshman of the Year and won twice. For his senior year he transferred to Louisiana State University and the LSU Tigers golf team, where he was Southeastern Conference Newcomer of the Year.

Kleén ranked 9th in the PGA Tour University class of 2025, earning him Korn Ferry Tour membership. He reached a career best 23rd on the World Amateur Golf Ranking.

== Professional career ==
Kleén turned professional after graduating in May 2025, and made his pro debut at the European Tour's Soudal Open, where he made the cut and shot a final round 67, the 5th best score of the day.

In 2026, he tied for 3rd at the Danish Golf Challenge, two strokes behind winner Tapio Pulkkanen.

== Amateur wins ==
- 2016 Skandia Tour Regional #3 Västergötland
- 2017 Skandia Tour Future #4 Göteborg
- 2018 Delsjö Junior Open, Teen Tour Future #5
- 2023 Puerto Rico Classic, Golf Club of Georgia Collegiate Invitational
- 2024 Visit Knoxville Collegiate

== Professional wins (1) ==
=== Nordic Golf League wins (1) ===
No.	Date	Tournament	Winning score	Margin of victory	Runner-up
1	25 Sep 2026	Folksam Championship	−10 (73-68-65=206)	2 strokes	(Sweden) David Lundgren

== Team appearances ==
Amateur

- European Boys' Team Championship (representing Sweden): 2019
- Junior Golf World Cup (representing Sweden): 2019
- European Amateur Team Championship (representing Sweden): 2023, 2024 (winners)
- Spirit International Amateur (representing Sweden): 2024
- Bonallack Trophy (representing Europe): 2025
