= 2026 Nordic Golf League =

Golf tour season

2026 Nordic Golf League season
- Duration: 14 February 2026 – 16 October 2026
- Number of official events: 32
- Most wins: (Sweden) Jesper Sandborg (3) (Denmark) Martin Simonsen (3)
- Order of Merit: (Sweden) David Lundgren

The 2026 Nordic Golf League was the 28th season of the Nordic Golf League, a third-tier tour recognised by the European Tour.

== Schedule ==
The following table lists official events during the 2026 season.

| Date | Tournament | Host country | Purse | Winner(s) (Note: The number in brackets after each winner's name is the number of Nordic Golf League events they had won up to and including that tournament. It is rare for someone to accumulate many wins on the Nordic Golf League as success at this level usually leads to promotion to the Challenge Tour.) | OWGR points |
|---|---|---|---|---|---|
| 16 Feb | GolfStar Winter Series Dunes | Spain | SKr 580,000 | (Sweden) Albin Tidén (2) | 1.54 |
| 20 Feb | GolfStar Winter Series Forest | Spain | SKr 580,000 | (Sweden) Martin Eriksson (3) | 1.54 |
| 25 Feb | Infinitum ECCO Masters | Spain | €50,000 | (Denmark) Martin Simonsen (1) | 2.18 |
| 1 Mar | Infinitum Championship | Spain | €50,000 | (Norway) Mats Ege (1) | 2.27 |
| 5 Mar | Infinitum Spring Series Final | Spain | €50,000 | (Finland) Lauri Ruuska (2) | 2.16 |
| 11 Apr | Sand Valley Open | Poland | €50,000 | (Sweden) Albin Tidén (3) | 1.87 |
| 15 Apr | ECCO Tour Sand Valley Masters | Poland | €50,000 | (Scotland) Eric McIntosh (1) | 1.82 |
| 19 Apr | Sand Valley Spring Series Championship | Poland | €50,000 | (Sweden) Adam Wallin (5) | 1.70 |
| 1 May | Big Green Egg Blekinge Open | Sweden | SKr 500,000 | (Denmark) Martin Simonsen (2) | 1.35 |
| 8 May | Royal Unibrew Championship | Denmark | €45,000 | (Norway) Sebastian Eidsæther Syr (2) | 0.95 |
| 14 May | Gamle Fredrikstad Open | Norway | SKr 470,000 | (Norway) Alexander Settemsdal (1) | 0.98 |
| 23 May | Cutter & Buck Fjällbacka Open | Sweden | SKr 530,000 | (Sweden) Jesper Sandborg (3) | 0.97 |
| 29 May | Trust Forsikring Championship | Denmark | €50,000 | (Denmark) Martin Simonsen (3) | 0.93 |
| 5 Jun | Samsø Festival Pro-Am | Denmark | €40,000 | (Sweden) David Lundgren (1) | 0.41 |
| 12 Jun | Indoor Golf Group Göteborg Open | Sweden | SKr 530,000 | (Sweden) Anton Karlsson (4) | 1.11 |
| 19 Jun | GolfPromote 25th Anniversary Open | Denmark | €70,000 | (Sweden) Jesper Sandborg (4) | 1.06 |
| 26 Jun | PGA of Sweden Championship | Sweden | SKr 530,000 | (Sweden) Per Längfors (5) | 1.21 |
| 3 Jul | MoreGolf Mastercard Stockholm | Sweden | SKr 530,000 | (Sweden) Rasmus Holmberg (3) | 1.07 |
| 10 Jul | SM Match | Sweden | SKr 460,000 | (Norway) Sebastian Eidsæther Syr (3) | 1.08 |
| 23 Jul | Holtsmark Open | Norway | SKr 470,000 | (Norway) Philip Linberg Bondestad (1) | 1.06 |
| 31 Jul | Max Matthiessen Team Trophy | Denmark | €60,000 | (Denmark) August Thor Høst (4) and (Denmark) Christian Jacobsen (5) | n/a |
| 8 Aug | NeH Hammarö Open | Sweden | SKr 530,000 | (Sweden) Johannes Axell (1) | 0.94 |
| 14 Aug | FootJoy Skåne Challenge | Sweden | SKr 530,000 | (Sweden) Carl Härdin (1) | 1.08 |
| 29 Aug | Finnish Open | Finland | €50,000 | (Sweden) David Nyfjäll (2) | 0.74 |
| 4 Sep | Crona Software Halland Open | Sweden | SKr 530,000 | (Sweden) David Nyfjäll (3) | 1.15 |
| 11 Sep | Nicon Industries Championship | Denmark | €50,000 | (Denmark) Daniel Toft (a) (1) | 0.79 |
| 18 Sep | Søllerød Championship | Denmark | €50,000 | (Sweden) Rasmus Holmberg (4) | 0.84 |
| 25 Sep | Folksam Championship | Sweden | SKr 600,000 | (Sweden) Algot Kleén (1) | 1.13 |
| 8 Oct | Destination Gotland Open | Sweden | SKr 600,000 | (Sweden) Jesper Sandborg (5) | 0.87 |
| 16 Oct | Road to Europe Final | Denmark | €50,000 | (Netherlands) Jerry Ji (1) | 0.97 |

== Order of Merit ==
The Order of Merit was titled as the Road to Europe and was based on tournament results during the season, calculated using a points-based system. The top five players on the Order of Merit (not otherwise exempt) earned status to play on the 2027 Challenge Tour (HotelPlanner Tour).

| Position | Player | Points | Status earned |
|---|---|---|---|
| 1 | (Sweden) David Lundgren | 76,518 | Qualified for Challenge Tour (made cut in Q School) |
| 2 | (Sweden) David Nyfjäll | 60,279 | Qualified for European Tour (Top 15 in Q School) |
| 3 | (Sweden) Jesper Sandborg | 57,766 | Qualified for Challenge Tour (made cut in Q School) |
| 4 | (Sweden) Albin Tidén | 43,046 | Promoted to Challenge Tour |
| 5 | (Denmark) Martin Simonsen | 42,757 | Promoted to Challenge Tour |
| 6 | (Norway) Sebastian Eidsæther Syr | 38,429 | Promoted to Challenge Tour |
| 7 | (Sweden) Anton Karlsson | 37,938 | Promoted to Challenge Tour |
| 8 | (Sweden) Oliver Lilliedahl | 37,189 | Qualified for Challenge Tour (made cut in Q School) |
| 9 | (Scotland) Eric McIntosh | 34,996 | Promoted to Challenge Tour |
| 10 | (Sweden) Algot Kleén | 32,526 | |

== See also ==
- 2026 Danish Golf Tour
- 2026 Finnish Tour
- 2026 Swedish Golf Tour
