= Erik Tjärnberg =

Swedish golfer (born 2006)

Personal information
- Full name: Karl Erik Tjärnberg
- Nationality: Sweden
- Born: 9 April 2006 (age 20) Huddinge, Stockholm County, Sweden

Career
- Sport: Golf
- College: East Tennessee State University
- Status: Amateur
- Current tour: Nordic Golf League

Karl Erik Tjärnberg (born 9 April 2006) is a Swedish amateur golfer. He won the 2025 Swedish Junior Strokeplay Championship and bronze at the 2024 European Boys' Team Championship.

== Early life ==
Tjärnberg was raised in Segeltorp, Huddinge Municipality and represents Kristianstad Golf Club.

== Amateur career ==
Tjärnberg had success on the junior circuit and won the 2025 Swedish Junior Strokeplay Championship.

He represented his country at the 2024 European Boys' Team Championship in Austria where they finished 3rd, behind France and England.

In the summer of 2025, Tjärnberg made six starts on the Nordic Golf League, where he won the Golfkusten Blekinge by 4 strokes ahead of Tobias Edén, to earn his first Official World Golf Ranking points.

He had a successful 2026 where he finished 4th at the Portuguese International Amateur Championship, 3rd at the Spanish International Amateur Championship, and runner-up at the Lytham Trophy in England, to sit second in the European Golf Association's European Amateur Order of Merit at the conclusion of the Front 9 swing in May.

== College career ==
Tjärnberg has accepted a golf scholarship to East Tennessee State University and will start playing with the East Tennessee State Buccaneers men's golf team in the fall of 2026.

== Amateur wins ==
- 2022 Slaget om Skåne - Elit #3, Teen Tour Future #3
- 2023 Slaget om Skåne - Elit #3
- 2024 Slaget om Stockholm - Elit #2
- 2025 Swedish Junior Strokeplay Championship, Ljunghusen Junior Games

== Professional wins (1) ==
=== Nordic Golf League wins (1) ===
| No. | Date | Tournament | Winning score | Margin of victory | Runner-up |
|---|---|---|---|---|---|
| 1 | 2 May 2025 | Golfkusten Blekinge (as an amateur) | −14 (71-66-65=202) | 4 strokes | (Sweden) Tobias Edén |

== Team appearances ==
Amateur

- European Boys' Team Championship (representing Sweden): 2024
