= Nelson Mandela Bay Championship =

Professional golf tournament

Coordinates: 34.000°S 25.596°E

NMB Championship
Tournament information
- Location: Port Elizabeth, South Africa
- Established: 2023
- Course: Humewood Golf Club
- Par: 72
- Length: 6,938 yards (6,344 m)
- Tours: Sunshine Tour; Challenge Tour
- Format: Stroke play
- Prize fund: US$350,000
- Month played: February
- Final year: 2024

Tournament record score
- Aggregate: 272 Dylan Mostert (2023)
- To par: −16 as above

Final champion
- (Sweden) Björn Åkesson

Location map
- Location in South Africa Location in Eastern Cape

The Nelson Mandela Bay Championship was a professional golf tournament held at Humewood Golf Club, in Port Elizabeth, Eastern Cape, South Africa. It was played on the Sunshine Tour and Challenge Tour as a co-sanctioned event.

The tournament is not to be confused with the Nelson Mandela Championship, which was a European Tour and Sunshine Tour co-sanctioned event held in Durban, KwaZulu-Natal in 2012 and 2013.

== History ==
The inaugural tournament in 2023 was won by South African Dylan Mostert after he birdied the final hole to seal a one-stroke victory over compatriot Jaco Prinsloo.

The event returned as a co-sanctioned Sunshine Tour and Challenge Tour event in 2024; being retitled as the NMB Championship. The tournament was won by Björn Åkesson, after being shortened to 54 holes due to strong winds.

== Winners ==
Year	Tours (Note: AFR − Sunshine Tour; CHA − Challenge Tour.)	Winner	Score	To par	Margin of victory	Runner-up
NMB Championship
2024	AFR, CHA	(Sweden) Björn Åkesson	198 (Note: Shortened to 54 holes due to strong winds.)	−18	1 stroke	(England) Lee Slattery
Nelson Mandela Bay Championship
2023	AFR, CHA	(South Africa) Dylan Mostert	272	−16	1 stroke	(South Africa) Jaco Prinsloo
