= 2024 Nordic Golf League =

Golf tour season

2024 Nordic Golf League season
- Duration: 16 February 2024 – 18 October 2024
- Number of official events: 31
- Most wins: (Sweden) Christofer Rahm (3) (Denmark) Victor Sidal Svendsen (3)
- Order of Merit: (Sweden) Jesper Sandborg

The 2024 Nordic Golf League was the 26th season of the Nordic Golf League, a third-tier tour recognised by the European Tour.

== Schedule ==
The following table lists official events during the 2024 season.

Date	Tournament	Host country	Purse	Winner (Note: The number in brackets after each winner's name is the number of Nordic Golf League events they had won up to and including that tournament. It is rare for someone to accumulate many wins on the Nordic Golf League as success at this level usually leads to promotion to the Challenge Tour.)	OWGR points
18 Feb	GolfStar Winter Series (Links)	Spain	SKr 630,000	(Denmark) Victor Sidal Svendsen (2)	1.38
22 Feb	GolfStar Winter Series (Forest)	Spain	SKr 630,000	(Sweden) Christofer Rahm (1)	1.33
27 Feb	ECCO Tour Spanish Open	Spain	€50,000	(Sweden) Christofer Rahm (2)	1.49
2 Mar	ECCO Tour Catalunya Championship	Spain	€50,000	(Denmark) Alexander George Frances (3)	1.44
9 Apr	ECCO Tour Polish Masters	Poland	€50,000	(Sweden) Benjamin Hjort (1)	1.18
13 Apr	Sand Valley Championship	Poland	€50,000	(Sweden) Albin Tidén (1)	1.20
17 Apr	Sand Valley Spring Series Final	Poland	€50,000	(Sweden) Sebastian Petersen (3)	1.18
26 Apr	Bravo Tours Open	Denmark	€40,000	(Denmark) Jens Kristian Thysted (1)	0.75
3 May	Golfkusten Blekinge	Sweden	SKr 500,000	(Sweden) Albin Bergström (1)	1.25
18 May	Stora Hotellet Fjällbacka Open	Sweden	SKr 500,000	(Sweden) Christofer Rahm (3)	1.30
23 May	Gamle Fredrikstad Open	Sweden	SKr 470,000	(Denmark) Malthe Tandrup Laustsen (1)	0.75
31 May	Smørum Open	Denmark	€40,000	(Denmark) Mads Heller (a) (1)	0.83
7 Jun	Samsø Classic Pro-Am	Denmark	€35,000	(Denmark) Jens Kristian Thysted (2)	0.85
14 Jun	Greatdays Trophy	Sweden	SKr 500,000	(Sweden) Sebastian Petersen (4)	0.87
21 Jun	Danish Golf Open	Denmark	€40,000	(Norway) Philip Linberg Bondestad (a) (1)	0.83
29 Jun	PGA Championship Landeryd Masters	Sweden	SKr 620,000	(Sweden) Jesper Sandborg (1)	1.23
5 Jul	OnTee Grand Prix	Sweden	SKr 500,000	(Denmark) Christian Jacobsen (3)	1.15
12 Jul	Göteborg Open	Sweden	SKr 500,000	(Sweden) Tobias Ruth (3)	1.27
26 Jul	Holtsmark Open	Norway	SKr 470,000	(Norway) Sebastian Eidsæther Syr (1)	0.79
2 Aug	Esbjerg Open	Denmark	€35,000	(Norway) Jarand Ekeland Arnøy (5)	1.01
9 Aug	Forsbacka Open	Sweden	SKr 500,000	(Sweden) Jesper Sandborg (2)	1.28
16 Aug	Skåne Challenge	Sweden	SKr 500,000	(Denmark) Victor Sidal Svendsen (3)	1.27
24 Aug	Timberwise Finnish Open	Finland	€50,000	(Denmark) Victor Sidal Svendsen (4)	0.54
30 Aug	Footjoy Finnish Swing	Finland	€50,000	(Denmark) Anders Emil Ejlersen (1)	0.67
7 Sep	SM Match	Sweden	SKr 450,000	(Sweden) Oliver Gillberg (4)	1.22
13 Sep	H2O x Danish.Golf Championship	Denmark	€35,000	(Denmark) Alexander George Frances (4)	0.74
19 Sep	Great Northern Challenge	Denmark	DKr 500,000	(Sweden) Oliver Gillberg (5)	1.51
27 Sep	Titleist Championship	Sweden	SKr 550,000	(Sweden) Hugo Townsend (1)	1.18
4 Oct	Trust Forsikring Championship	Denmark	€40,000	(Denmark) Christian Jacobsen (4)	0.90
10 Oct	Destination Gotland Open	Sweden	SKr 600,000	(Sweden) Anton Karlsson (2)	1.07
18 Oct	Road to Europe Final	Denmark	€35,000	(Denmark) Peter Launer Bæk (4)	1.05

== Order of Merit ==
The Order of Merit was titled as the GolfBox Road to Europe and was based on tournament results during the season, calculated using a points-based system. The top five players on the Order of Merit (not otherwise exempt) earned status to play on the 2025 Challenge Tour (HotelPlanner Tour). (Note: Despite finishing outside the top five on the Order of Merit; Svendsen also earned promotion to the Challenge Tour by winning three times during the 2024 Nordic Golf League season.)

Position	Player	Points	Status earned
1	(Sweden) Jesper Sandborg	54,099	Promoted to Challenge Tour
2	(Sweden) Albin Bergström	52,366	Promoted to Challenge Tour
3	(Denmark) Christian Jacobsen	45,270	Qualified for Challenge Tour (made cut in Q School)
4	(Denmark) Alexander George Frances	44,370	Qualified for European Tour (Top 20 in Q School)
5	(Denmark) Jens Kristian Thysted	43,520	Promoted to Challenge Tour
6	(Sweden) Oliver Gillberg	40,115	Promoted to Challenge Tour
7	(Sweden) Hugo Townsend	34,552	Promoted to Challenge Tour
8	(Denmark) Victor Sidal Svendsen	33,421	Promoted to Challenge Tour
9	(Sweden) Sebastian Petersen	32,585	
10	(Sweden) Christofer Rahm	32,498	Finished in Top 70 of Challenge Tour Rankings

== See also ==
- 2024 Danish Golf Tour
- 2024 Finnish Tour
- 2024 Swedish Golf Tour
