= The Princess (golf) =

Tournament information
- Location: Malmö, Sweden
- Established: 2009
- Course: PGA Sweden National
- Par: 72
- Length: 7,417 yards (6,782 m)
- Tour: Challenge Tour
- Format: Stroke play
- Prize fund: €200,000
- Month played: June/July
- Final year: 2011

Tournament record score
- Aggregate: 270 Thorbjørn Olesen (2010)
- To par: −16 Ricardo Santos (2011)

Final champion
- (Portugal) Ricardo Santos
- Location in Sweden

The Princess was a golf tournament on the Challenge Tour, played in Sweden, from 2009 to 2011.

== Winners ==
| Year | Winner | Score | To par | Margin of victory | Runner(s)-up | Venue |
|---|---|---|---|---|---|---|
| 2011 | (Portugal) Ricardo Santos | 272 | −16 | 3 strokes | (England) Daniel Brooks | PGA Sweden National |
| 2010 | (Denmark) Thorbjørn Olesen | 270 | −14 | 2 strokes | (Sweden) Peter Gustafsson (Austria) Bernd Wiesberger | Båstad |
| 2009 | (England) Andrew Butterfield | 271 | −13 | 1 stroke | (England) Richard McEvoy (Spain) Carlos Rodiles | Båstad |
