= Andreas Halvorsen (golfer) =

Norwegian professional golfer

Personal information
- Nationality: Norway
- Born: 8 December 1996 (age 29) Larvik, Norway
- Height: 6 ft 3 in (191 cm)
- Weight: 180 lb (82 kg)

Career
- Sport: Golf
- Turned professional: 2015
- Current tour: European Tour
- Former tours: Challenge Tour; PGA Tour Latinoamérica; Nordic Golf League
- Professional wins: 6

Number of wins by tour
- Challenge Tour: 1
- Other: 5

Best results in major championships
- Masters Tournament: DNP
- PGA Championship: DNP
- U.S. Open: CUT: 2019
- The Open Championship: DNP

Andreas Halvorsen (born 8 December 1996) is a Norwegian professional golfer and European Tour player. He won the 2024 Danish Golf Challenge, and was a runner-up at the 2017 Visa Open de Argentina and 2019 Abierto Mexicano de Golf.

== Amateur career ==
Halvorsen played for the National Team as an amateur. He represented Norway at the 2012 European Young Masters, and the European Boys' Team Championship three times, finishing second in 2013.

He played in the 2014 Eisenhower Trophy and won the 2014 Junior Golf World Cup in Japan with Jarand Ekeland Arnøy, Kristoffer Reitan and Viktor Hovland, beating the American team led by Cameron Young into second.

Halvorsen moved to St. Augustine, Florida in 2013 to train at the Tom Burnett Junior Golf Academy. During the 2013-14 Future Collegians World Tour season, he won five tournaments including the St. Augustine Amateur and the Florida Azalea Amateur. He played in the 2014 U.S. Junior Amateur where he knocked out Ryan Ruffels before losing 1 up to Sam Horsfield in the quarter-final.

Halvorsen decided to skip college and turn pro at 18.

== Professional career ==
Halvorsen turned professional by mid-2015. He played on the PGA Tour Latinoamérica between 2016 and 2022, where he lost a playoff at the 2017 Visa Open de Argentina. In 2019, he was runner-up at the Abierto Mexicano de Golf, and in 2020 runner-up at the Classic at the Club at Weston Hills, a LocaliQ Series event.

He won two tournaments in the 2023 Nordic Golf League and finished the season 4th in the Order of Merit, earning promotion to the 2024 Challenge Tour, where he won the Danish Golf Challenge in his fifth start.

After losing a playoff at the Kolkata Challenge, Halvorsen earned promotion to the 2025 European Tour, (Note: Halvorsen received a medical exemption for six events during the 2024 Challenge Tour, giving him six events of the 2025 Challenge Tour to try to collect the 40 points he was short for graduation to the 2025 European Tour.) where he recorded top-6 finishes at the AfrAsia Bank Mauritius Open and Hero Indian Open.

== Amateur wins ==
- 2012 Norgescup #6, Norgescup Finale
- 2013 International Trophy, Team Norway Junior Tour #3, St Augustine Amateur
- 2014 Florida Azalea Amateur

== Professional wins (6) ==
=== Challenge Tour wins (1) ===
No.	Date	Tournament	Winning score	Margin of victory	Runners-up
1	26 May 2024	Danish Golf Challenge	−19 (66-66-66-71=269)	3 strokes	(Iceland) Guðmundur Kristjánsson, (Finland) Oliver Lindell, (England) John Parry

Challenge Tour playoff record (0–1)

No.	Year	Tournament	Opponents	Result
1	2025	Kolkata Challenge	(England) Joshua Berry, (India) Om Prakash Chouhan, (Austria) Lukas Nemecz	Berry won with birdie on second extra hole Chouhan eliminated by par on first hole

=== Nordic Golf League wins (2) ===
No.	Date	Tournament	Winning score	Margin of victory	Runner-up
1	11 Apr 2023	Sand Valley Polish Masters	−14 (67-67-68=202)	3 strokes	(Sweden) Christofer Blomstrand
2	19 Apr 2023	Sand Valley Spring Series Final	−16 (65-66-69=200)	Playoff	(Sweden) Jesper Hagborg Asp

=== Minor League Golf Tour wins (1) ===
No.	Date	Tournament	Winning score	Margin of victory	Runner-up
1	20 Aug 2018	August Atlantic National Classic	−8 (63)	3 strokes	(United States) Kris Wilcoxon

=== Other wins (2) ===
- 2021 Norwegian National Golf Championship
- 2022 United Way Classic (All Pro Tour)

== Playoff record ==
PGA Tour Latinoamérica playoff record (0–1)

No.	Year	Tournament	Opponents	Result
1	2017	Visa Open de Argentina	(United States) Brady Schnell, (United States) Matt Ryan	Schnell won with birdie on first extra hole

== Team appearances ==
Amateur

- European Young Masters (representing Norway): 2012
- European Boys' Team Championship (representing Norway): 2012, 2013, 2014
- Junior Golf World Cup (representing Norway): 2014 (winners)
- Eisenhower Trophy (representing Norway): 2014

== See also ==
- 2025 European Tour Qualifying School graduates
