= 2025 Nordic Golf League =

Golf tour season

2025 Nordic Golf League season
- Duration: 14 February 2025 – 17 October 2025
- Number of official events: 32
- Most wins: (Sweden) Adam Wallin (4)
- Order of Merit: (Sweden) Adam Wallin

The 2025 Nordic Golf League was the 27th season of the Nordic Golf League, a third-tier tour recognised by the European Tour.

== Schedule ==
The following table lists official events during the 2025 season.

Date	Tournament	Host country	Purse	Winner(s) (Note: The number in brackets after each winner's name is the number of Nordic Golf League events they had won up to and including that tournament. It is rare for someone to accumulate many wins on the Nordic Golf League as success at this level usually leads to promotion to the Challenge Tour.)	OWGR points
16 Feb	GolfStar Winter Series (Links)	Spain	SKr 620,000	(Sweden) Adam Wallin (1)	2.20
20 Feb	GolfStar Winter Series (Forest)	Spain	SKr 620,000	(Denmark) Victor Bjørløw (1)	2.27
25 Feb	Infinitum Spanish Masters	Spain	€50,000	(Denmark) Oliver Hundebøll (2)	2.78
1 Mar	Infinitum Championship	Spain	€50,000	(Sweden) Tobias Edén (2)	2.79
5 Mar	Infinitum Spring Series Final	Spain	€50,000	(Denmark) Søren Kjeldsen (1)	2.80
15 Apr	Sand Valley Championship	Poland	€50,000	(Denmark) Jeppe Kristian Andersen (4)	1.98
19 Apr	ECCO Tour Sand Valley Masters	Poland	€50,000	(Denmark) Kasper Nyland (1)	1.98
23 Apr	Sand Valley Spring Series Final	Poland	€50,000	(Sweden) Tobias Edén (3)	1.96
2 May	Golfkusten Blekinge	Sweden	SKr 500,000	(Sweden) Erik Tjärnberg (a) (1)	1.94
9 May	Bravo Tours Open	Denmark	€45,000	(Finland) Ilari Saulo (1)	1.26
17 May	Cutter & Buck Fjällbacka Open	Sweden	SKr 500,000	(Denmark) Morten Ørum Madsen (5)	1.72
22 May	Gamle Fredrikstad Open	Norway	SKr 420,000	(Netherlands) Rick Hessing (1)	1.22
30 May	Smørum Open	Denmark	€40,000	(Sweden) David Nyfjäll (1)	1.46
6 Jun	Samsø Festival Pro-Am	Denmark	€35,000	(Denmark) Jamie Tofte Nielsen (1)	0.68
13 Jun	Live it Trophy	Sweden	SKr 500,000	(Sweden) Jesper Hagborg Asp (2)	1.33
20 Jun	Søllerød Championship	Denmark	€40,000	(Denmark) Benjamin Poke (4)	1.08
28 Jun	PGA of Sweden Championship Landeryd	Sweden	SKr 600,000	(Sweden) Anton Karlsson (3)	1.67
5 Jul	Enklare att vara proffs	Sweden	SKr 500,000	(Sweden) Adam Wallin (2)	1.70
10 Jul	Skövde Open	Sweden	SKr 500,000	(Sweden) Sebastian Petersen (5)	1.66
24 Jul	Holtsmark Open	Norway	SKr 420,000	(Norway) Henric Bjelke (1)	1.43
1 Aug	Max Matthiessen Team Trophy	Denmark	€60,000	(Norway) Tom Røed Karlsen (1) and (Denmark) Kasper Nyland (2)	n/a
8 Aug	Forsbacka Open	Sweden	SKr 500,000	(Iceland) Hlynur Bergsson (1)	1.61
15 Aug	Skåne Challenge	Sweden	SKr 500,000	(Sweden) Adam Wallin (3)	1.59
23 Aug	Finnish Open	Finland	€50,000	(Denmark) Jacob Worm Agerschou (1)	0.94
29 Aug	Footjoy Finnish Swing	Finland	€50,000	(Denmark) Jacob Worm Agerschou (2)	0.66
6 Sep	SM Match	Sweden	SKr 450,000	(Netherlands) Thom Hoetmer (1)	1.20
12 Sep	Esbjerg Open	Denmark	€45,000	(Denmark) August Thor Høst (3)	1.03
18 Sep	Great Northern Challenge	Denmark	DKr 500,000	(Sweden) Martin Eriksson (2)	1.49
26 Sep	FootJoy Championship	Sweden	SKr 550,000	(Sweden) Tobias Edén (4)	1.09
3 Oct	Trust Forsikring Championship	Denmark	€45,000	(Denmark) Oskar Ambrosius (2)	0.91
9 Oct	Destination Gotland Open	Sweden	SKr 600,000	(Sweden) Adam Wallin (4)	1.11
17 Oct	Road to Europe Final	Denmark	€45,000	(Denmark) Jacob Worm Agerschou (3)	0.90

== Order of Merit ==
The Order of Merit was titled as the Road to Europe and was based on tournament results during the season, calculated using a points-based system. The top five players on the Order of Merit earned status to play on the 2026 Challenge Tour (HotelPlanner Tour).

Position	Player	Points	Status earned
1	(Sweden) Adam Wallin	76,045	Promoted to Challenge Tour
2	(Sweden) Tobias Edén	55,797	Promoted to Challenge Tour
3	(Denmark) Jacob Worm Agerschou	48,687	Promoted to Challenge Tour
4	(Sweden) Martin Eriksson	42,604	Promoted to Challenge Tour
5	(Denmark) Victor Bjørløw	40,007	Promoted to Challenge Tour
6	(Denmark) Kasper Nyland	34,950	
7	(Sweden) Jesper Hagborg Asp	34,716	
8	(Denmark) Anders Emil Ejlersen	32,819	Finished in Top 70 of Challenge Tour Rankings
9	(Sweden) Sebastian Petersen	32,798	
10	(Norway) Tom Røed Karlsen	31,961	

== See also ==
- 2025 Danish Golf Tour
- 2025 Finnish Tour
- 2025 Swedish Golf Tour
