= Rocco Repetto =

Spanish professional golfer (born 2002)

Personal information
- Full name: Rocco Paolo Repetto Taylor
- Nationality: Spain
- Born: 27 November 2002 (age 23) Fuengirola, Spain
- Height: 187 cm (6 ft 2 in)

Career
- Sport: Golf
- Turned professional: 2024
- Current tour: European Tour
- Former tours: Challenge Tour; Alps Tour
- Professional wins: 2

Number of wins by tour
- Challenge Tour: 1
- Other: 1

Best results in major championships
- Masters Tournament: DNP
- PGA Championship: DNP
- U.S. Open: CUT: 2026
- The Open Championship: DNP

Rocco Paolo Repetto Taylor (born 27 November 2002) is a Spanish professional golfer who plays on the European Tour.

== Career ==
Repetto hails from Fuengirola on the Costa del Sol. He attended Oral Roberts University in Tulsa, Oklahoma from 2020 to 2024 and played golf with the Oral Roberts Golden Eagles men's golf team.

Repetto turned professional in 2024 and joined the 2025 Alps Tour, where he won the La Cigale Golf Open and was runner-up at the Tunisian Open. He joined the 2025 Challenge Tour in June after winning the Challenge de Cádiz on home soil, playing on an invitation. He holed a 20-foot putt on the last to save par and secure victory.

Repetto finished 18th in the season rankings to graduate to the European Tour for 2026.

== Amateur wins ==
- 2019 Campeonato Internacional de Andalucia Sub-18
- 2022 Campeonato Internacional Absoluto de Andalucia

== Professional wins (2) ==
=== Challenge Tour wins (1) ===
No.	Date	Tournament	Winning score	Margin of victory	Runner-up
1	1 Jun 2025	Challenge de Cádiz	−13 (66-72-69-68=275)	1 stroke	(Spain) Victor Pastor

=== Alps Tour wins (1) ===
No.	Date	Tournament	Winning score	Margin of victory	Runner-up
1	26 Mar 2025	La Cigale Golf Open	−8 (66-70=136) (Note: Shortened to 36 holes due to weather.)	1 stroke	(Italy) Filippo Bergamaschi

== Results in major championships ==
Tournament	2026
Masters Tournament	
PGA Championship	
U.S. Open	CUT
The Open Championship	

Did not play

CUT = missed the half-way cut

== See also ==
- 2025 Challenge Tour graduates
- 2026 European Tour Qualifying School graduates
