= Jesper Sandborg =

Swedish professional golfer (born 1993)

Personal information
- Nationality: Sweden
- Born: 8 June 1993 (age 33) Linköping, Sweden

Career
- Sport: Golf
- Turned professional: 2014
- Current tour: Challenge Tour
- Former tour: Nordic Golf League
- Professional wins: 13

Best results in major championships
- Masters Tournament: DNP
- PGA Championship: DNP
- U.S. Open: DNP
- The Open Championship: CUT: 2025

Achievements and awards
- Nordic Golf League Order of Merit winner: 2024
- PGA of Sweden Future Fund Award: 2025

Jesper Sandborg (born 8 June 1993) is a Swedish professional golfer and Challenge Tour player. In 2024, he topped the Nordic Golf League Order of Merit and was runner-up at the Indoor Golf Group Challenge.

== Career ==
Sandborg competed on the Swedish Junior Tour between 2010 and 2013, and started playing on the Nordic Golf League in 2014. He earned a place on the Challenge Tour at the 2019 European Tour Qualifying School.

In 2023. he returned to the Nordic Golf League, where he won two tournaments in 2024. His opening round 64 at the Forsbacka Open set a new course record. Winning the Swedish PGA Championship earned him a start at the 2024 Indoor Golf Group Challenge on the Challenge Tour, where he finished runner-up, a stroke behind Joakim Lagergren and a stroke ahead of Mikael Lindberg and Jack Senior in third.

Sandborg topped the 2024 Nordic Golf League Order of Merit to graduate to the Challenge Tour for the 2025 season.

In 2025, he shared the overnight lead at the Delhi Challenge in India after he shot a seven-under-par opening round of 65, ultimately settling for a tied 19th place.

== Amateur wins ==
- 2010 Skandia Tour Östergötland #5
- 2013 Skandia Tour Riks #2 Östergötland

== Professional wins (13) ==
=== Nordic Golf League wins (5) ===
No.	Date	Tournament	Winning score	Margin of victory	Runner(s)-up
1	29 Jun 2024	PGA Championship Landeryd Masters	−11 (70-70-70-67=277)	3 strokes	(Sweden) Albin Bergström, (Sweden) Linus Lilliedahl, (Sweden) Felix Pålson, (Denmark) Jens Kristian Thysted
2	9 Aug 2024	Forsbacka Open	−12 (64-68=132) (Note: Shortened to 36 holes due to weather.)	3 strokes	(Sweden) Alfons Bondesson (a), (Sweden) Oliver Gillberg, (Denmark) Christian Jacobsen, (Sweden) Hugo Townsend
3	23 May 2026	Cutter & Buck Fjällbacka Open	−11 (73-64-65=202)	1 stroke	(Sweden) Johannes Axell, (Sweden) Elias Pettersson
4	19 Jun 2026	GolfPromote 25th Anniversary Open	−12 (71-66-67=204)	Playoff	(Sweden) David Lundgren
5	8 Oct 2026	Destination Gotland Open	−11 (69-69-67=205)	2 strokes	(Sweden) David Nyfjäll

=== Ligma Tour wins (3) ===
No.	Date	Tournament	Winning score	Margin of victory	Runner-up
1	2 Jun 2023	Finspång Open	−6 (71-67=138)	Playoff	(Sweden) Linus Jonsson
2	31 May 2024	Dormy Challenge	−10 (65-69=134)	5 strokes	(Sweden) Oliver Gillberg
3	1 Aug 2024	Finspång Open	−9 (71-64=135)	5 strokes	(Sweden) Rasmus Rosin

=== Other wins (5) ===
- 2015 Arboga Open (SGF Golf Ranking)
- 2016 Hjo S Open (SGF Golf Ranking)
- 2017 Hjo S Open (Future Series)
- 2018 Swerob Torshälla Open (Future Series)
- 2024 NSGK Open (Future Series)

== Results in major championships ==
Tournament	2025
Masters Tournament	
PGA Championship	
U.S. Open	
The Open Championship	CUT

Did not play

CUT = missed the half-way cut
