= Albin Bergström =

Swedish professional golfer (born 1999)

Personal information
- Nationality: Sweden
- Born: 27 March 1999 (age 27) Falsterbo, Sweden

Career
- Sport: Golf
- College: University of South Florida
- Turned professional: 2022
- Current tour: European Tour
- Former tours: Challenge Tour; Nordic Golf League; Swedish Golf Tour
- Professional wins: 1

Achievements and awards
- Atlantic Coast Conference Freshman of the Year: 2019
- University of South Florida Male Student-Athlete of the Year: 2021
- American Athletic Conference Golfer of the Year: 2022
- Swedish Golf Tour Order of Merit winner: 2024

Albin Bergström (born 27 March 1999) is a Swedish professional golfer and European Tour player. He won the 2019 European Amateur Team Championship and the 2024 Swedish Golf Tour Order of Merit.

== Amateur career ==
Bergström, representing Ljunghusen Golf Club, won several titles on the junior circuit in Sweden. In 2016, he finished 7th at the Junior Players Championship at TPC Sawgrass.

He appeared for the National Team at the European Boys' Team Championship twice, and the European Amateur Team Championship twice, securing the gold medal at the 2019 European Amateur Team Championship at Ljunghusen Golf Club, his home course. Alongside Ludvig Åberg, Vincent Norrman, David Nyfjäll and Pontus Nyholm, he beat Ben Jones, 3 and 2, for the team to win 4 1/2–2 1/2 over England in the final. In 2020, he lost his final match against Germany paired with Nyfjäll, and his team finished with the silver medal after a 1–2 score.

Bergström attended University of South Florida 2018–2022, where he played collegiate golf with the South Florida Bulls golf team. He was Atlantic Coast Conference Freshman of the Year and American Athletic Conference Golfer of the Year as a senior, after winning the conference championship as a junior.

Representing Sweden at the 2021 Spirit International Amateur in Texas, he won the men's team gold together with Hugo Townsend.

Bergström won three out of four points to help the international team win the 2022 Arnold Palmer Cup, only losing his Sunday singles match to Gordon Sargent, 5 and 4.

== Professional career ==
Bergström turned professional after graduating in 2022 and joined the 2023 Challenge Tour. His best finish in his rookie season was a tie for 8th at the Euram Bank Open in Austria.

For 2024, he dropped down to the Nordic Golf League, where he recorded one win and finished second in the rankings, to earn promotion back to the Challenge Tour. He reached the semi-finals at the Swedish Matchplay Championship and was runner-up at the Swedish PGA Championship, to top the 2024 Swedish Golf Tour Order of Merit ahead of Jesper Sandborg and Oliver Gillberg.

In 2025, Bergström was in contention at the Le Vaudreuil Golf Challenge, sharing the overnight lead ahead of the final round and ultimately finished a stroke away from joining the playoff. He sat 64th in the rankings ahead of the final two events, but tied for 4th at the Hangzhou Open and for 3rd at the Rolex Grand Final, to finish 20th in the rankings and graduate to the European Tour for 2026.

Bergström missed the first ten cuts as a rookie on the European Tour but then found some form at the Soudal Open in Belgium, where he was tied 6th ahead of the final round and ultimately tied for 13th, only 4 strokes behind winner Richard Sterne.

== Amateur wins ==
- 2016 Norwegian Winter Open (Alcaidesa)
- 2019 Fort Lauderdale Intercollegiate, Windon Memorial
- 2021 The American Championship, Spirit International Amateur (with Hugo Townsend)

== Professional wins (1) ==
=== Nordic Golf League wins (1) ===
No.	Date	Tournament	Winning score	Margin of victory	Runner-up
1	3 May 2024	Golfkusten Blekinge	−10 (70-65-71=206)	2 strokes	(Sweden) Hannes Rönneblad

== Team appearances ==
Amateur

- Junior Golf World Cup (representing Sweden): 2016
- European Boys' Team Championship (representing Sweden): 2016, 2017
- European Amateur Team Championship (representing Sweden): 2019 (winners), 2020
- Spirit International Amateur (representing Sweden): 2021 (winners)
- Arnold Palmer Cup (representing the International team): 2022 (winners)

== See also ==
- 2025 Challenge Tour graduates
- 2026 European Tour Qualifying School graduates
