= Christofer Rahm =

Swedish professional golfer

Personal information
- Full name: Christofer Magnus Gustav Rahm
- Nationality: Sweden
- Born: 12 February 1998 (age 28) Stockholm, Sweden
- Height: 6 ft 8 in (2.03 m)

Career
- Sport: Golf
- College: University of North Carolina Wilmington; Arkansas State University
- Turned professional: 2022
- Current tour: Challenge Tour
- Former tour: Nordic Golf League
- Professional wins: 4

Achievements and awards
- PGA of Sweden Future Fund Award: 2025

Christofer Magnus Gustav Rahm (born 12 February 1998) is a Swedish professional golfer who plays on the Challenge Tour. He won three tournaments on the 2024 Nordic Golf League in 2024 to earn battlefield promotion

== Early life and amateur career ==
Rahm spent 10 years of his childhood in Spain, and was educated at the American School of Dubai. He won the 2015 Ras Al Khaimah Men's Amateur Championship, and made a handful of starts on the 2016 MENA Golf Tour. In 2017, representing Kungsbacka Golf Club, he finished third at the Qatar Open Amateur Championship and won the Swedish Junior Strokeplay Championship at Vallda Golf & Country Club.

Rahm attended University of North Carolina Wilmington from 2017 to 2021 and Arkansas State University from 2021 to 2022. Playing with the UNC Wilmington Seahawks, he was named First-team All-Coastal Athletic Association and with the Arkansas State Red Wolves, Second-team All-Sun Belt.

== Professional career ==
Rahm turned professional after graduating in 2022 and joined the Nordic Golf League. He won three times on the 2024 Nordic Golf League to earn battlefield promotion for the Challenge Tour, where his first start was the Danish Golf Challenge in May.

In his second start, he tied for third at Challenge de Cádiz.

Rahm was runner-up at the 2025 Italian Challenge Open alongside his compatriot Robin Petersson, two strokes behind J. C. Ritchie.

== Personal life ==
His older sister Isabella Rahm played golf at University of Pennsylvania where she was captain for two years and won the Academic All-Ivy Award and the Penn Impact Award for senior student-athletes.

== Amateur wins ==
- 2014 Onsjö Junior Open, Carin Koch Junior Open
- 2015 Ras Al Khaimah Men's Amateur Championship
- 2016 Innersvingen Junior Open
- 2017 Swedish Junior Strokeplay Championship
- 2019 Teen Tour Elite #2

== Professional wins (4) ==
=== Nordic Golf League wins (3) ===
| No. | Date | Tournament | Winning score | Margin of victory | Runner(s)-up |
|---|---|---|---|---|---|
| 1 | 22 Feb 2024 | GolfStar Winter Series (Forest) | −12 (70-65-69=204) | Playoff | (Finland) Matias Honkala |
| 2 | 27 Feb 2024 | ECCO Tour Spanish Open | −14 (69-65-68=202) | 2 strokes | (Denmark) Alexander George Frances, (Iceland) Bjarki Pétursson (a) |
| 3 | 18 May 2024 | Stora Hotellet Fjällbacka Open | −20 (63-63-70=196) | 1 stroke | (Sweden) Björn Hellgren |

=== Other wins (1) ===
- 2022 Värmland Open (Future Series)
