= Christofer Blomstrand =

Swedish professional golfer (born 1991)

Personal information
- Nationality: Sweden
- Born: 9 December 1991 (age 34) Höör, Sweden
- Height: 182 cm (5 ft 11 1/2 in)

Career
- Sport: Golf
- Turned professional: 2011
- Current tour: European Tour
- Former tours: Challenge Tour; Sunshine Tour; Nordic Golf League
- Professional wins: 8

Number of wins by tour
- Sunshine Tour: 1
- Challenge Tour: 3
- Other: 4

Achievements and awards
- PGA of Sweden Future Fund Award: 2017

Christofer Blomstrand (born 9 December 1991) is a Swedish professional golfer. He has played on the European Tour where he was runner-up at 2018 Porsche European Open.

== Career ==
Blomstrand was born in Höör and is attached to Falsterbo Golf Club. He turned professional in 2011 and joined the Nordic Golf League. In 2015, he tied for 3rd at the ECCO German Masters and won his first professional title at the Race to HimmerLand in Denmark. He also won the Muscat Hills Golf Citizen Championship in Oman on the MENA Tour.

Blomstrand earned a 2016–17 Sunshine Tour card through qualifying school, and won the Zambia Sugar Open in April 2016 with a final round 63. He spent 2017 on the Challenge Tour, where his best finish was a tie for 4th place at the Finnish Challenge and the Bridgestone Challenge.

Blomstrand tied for 25th at qualifying school to capture the last available card for the 2018 European Tour, where he saw immediate success at Joburg Open, finding himself in solo second place, after a third round of 62, where he was 11-under-par for the day after 14 holes to raise hopes of an historic 59. He ultimately finished in a tie for 8th with a final round 75. Later in the year he finished runner-up at Porsche European Open, one stroke behind Richard McEvoy.

After two seasons on the European Tour, Blomstrand dropped back down to the Challenge Tour. In 2020 he tied for 3rd at the Euram Bank Open, a dual ranking European and Challenge Tour event, and was runner-up at the Challenge Tour Grand Final, to finish 6th in the season rankings. He won twice on the 2023 Nordic Golf League, and was runner-up at the Sand Valley Polish Masters.

Blomstrand won the 2024 Vierumäki Finnish Challenge and was runner-up at the 2026 Jonsson Workwear Durban Open, where he shot a second round 61 to move into a tie for the lead.

== Professional wins (8) ==
=== Sunshine Tour wins (1) ===
No.	Date	Tournament	Winning score	Margin of victory	Runner-up
1	24 Apr 2016	Zambia Sugar Open	−16 (73-71-69-63=276)	3 strokes	(South Africa) CJ du Plessis

=== Challenge Tour wins (3) ===
No.	Date	Tournament	Winning score	Margin of victory	Runner(s)-up
1	18 Aug 2024	Vierumäki Finnish Challenge	−20 (66-69-68-65=268)	1 stroke	(France) Alexander Lévy, (Sweden) Mikael Lindberg
2	9 Aug 2026	Scottish Challenge	−19 (66-61-70-68=265)	2 strokes	(Sweden) Adam Wallin
2	30 Aug 2026	Dormy Open	−11 (68-66-68-67=269)	2 strokes	(Sweden) David Lundgren, (South Africa) Wilco Nienaber

=== Nordic Golf League wins (3) ===
No.	Date	Tournament	Winning score	Margin of victory	Runner(s)-up
1	3 Oct 2015	Race to HimmerLand	−8 (74-68-65=207)	2 strokes	(Denmark) Anders Schmidt Hansen, (Norway) Eirik Tage Johansen, (Denmark) Nikolaj Erland Nissen
2	23 Feb 2023	GolfStar Winter Series II	−16 (72-62-64=198)	4 strokes	(Sweden) Charlie Lindh
3	12 May 2023	Skåne Challenge	−6 (73-68-69=210)	2 strokes	(Sweden) Björn Åkesson

=== MENA Golf Tour wins (1) ===
No.	Date	Tournament	Winning score	Margin of victory	Runner-up
1	21 Oct 2015	Muscat Hills Golf Citizen Championship	−11 (67-68-70=205)	1 stroke	(Germany) Julian Kunzenbacher

== See also ==
- 2017 European Tour Qualifying School graduates
- 2026 Challenge Tour graduates
