= Niklas Lemke =

Swedish golfer

Personal information
- Full name: Karl Niklas Lemke
- Nationality: Sweden
- Born: 23 April 1984 (age 42) Linköping, Sweden
- Height: 6 ft 2 in (1.88 m)

Career
- Sport: Golf
- College: Arizona State University
- Turned professional: 2007
- Current tour: European Tour
- Former tours: Web.com Tour; Challenge Tour; Nordic Golf League; Gateway Tour
- Professional wins: 4

Karl Niklas Lemke (born 23 April 1984) is a Swedish professional golfer, who plays on the European Tour. He has formerly played on the Challenge Tour and the Web.com Tour in the United States.

== Early life ==
Lemke was born in Linköping, Sweden, son of golf professional Bertil Lemke, who himself competeted in seven European Tour tournaments on home soil, the 1976−1982 Scandinavian Enterprise Open, as well as met Seve Ballesteros and Jim Dent in a driving competition on Saturday evening of the tournament week at the 1977 event in Stockholm, Sweden.

== Amateur career ==
In 2002, Niklas Lemke won the Swedish Junior Match-play Championship at Hooks Golf Club, at the time representing Linköping Golf Club. He later came to represent Öijared Golf Club, situated east of Gothenburg, Sweden.

He represented Sweden at European Amateur championships in all age levels. He also represented Sweden twice at the Eisenhower Trophy, first time only 18 years old.

As an Arizona State University alum, Lemke's 2007 stroke average of 70.03 is the third best in the school's history, behind Paul Casey (69.87, 1999–2000) and Phil Mickelson (69.95, 1991–1992).

== Professional career ==
Lemke turned professional in 2007. In 2011, he had his best finish so far in a European Tour event, third at the Nordea Masters at Bro Hof Slott GC, Stockholm, Sweden, earning €93,900.

He has twice won the Swedish PGA Championship, in 2012 and in 2017, both times played at PGA Sweden National in Bara, outside Malmö, Sweden.

Lemke earned his European Tour card for 2019 with a sixth-place finish at the 2018 Qualifying School Final Stage. In 2019, he played 25 tournaments on the European Tour, making 15 cuts and three top-10s, finishing 118th on the Race to Dubai, with €299,187 in prize money, just missing out automatic qualifying for next season. Anyway, he finished in a tie for the final card the following year in his eleventh try at the European Tour Qualifying School in November 2019.

On 8 March 2020, Lemke finished tied 3rd at the Commercial Bank Qatar Masters in Doha, Qatar, one stroke from a playoff, after a finishing 6-under-par 65 round, despite two over par on his last four holes.

== Amateur wins ==
- 2002 Swedish Junior Match-play Championship
- 2006 Fighting Illini Invitational
- 2007 National Invitational Tournament

== Professional wins (4) ==
=== Nordic Golf League wins (3) ===
No.	Date	Tournament	Winning score	Margin of victory	Runner(s)-up
1	28 Apr 2012	PEAB PGA Grand Opening	−7 (70-68-71=209)	1 stroke	(Sweden) Magnus A. Carlsson
2	26 May 2017	Star for Life PGA Championship (2)	−12 (70-63-71=204)	Playoff	(Iceland) Haraldur Magnús, (Sweden) Christopher Feldborg Nielsen
3	14 Oct 2017	SGT Tourfinal Kristianstad Åhus Open	−5 (71-69-71=211)	Playoff	(Iceland) Axel Bóasson

=== Gateway Tour wins (1) ===
No.	Date	Tournament	Winning score	Margin of victory	Runner-up
1	10 Jan 2008	Desert Winter 1	−9 (67-72-68=207)	1 stroke	(United States) Justin Lee

== Team appearances ==
Amateur

- European Boys' Team Championship (representing Sweden): 2000, 2001 (winners), 2002
- Jacques Léglise Trophy (representing the Continent of Europe): 2001 (winners)
- Eisenhower Trophy (representing Sweden): 2002, 2006
- St Andrews Trophy (representing the Continent of Europe): 2002
- European Amateur Team Championship (representing Sweden): 2003, 2005
- European Youths' Team Championship (representing Sweden): 2004

== See also ==
- 2018 European Tour Qualifying School graduates
- 2019 European Tour Qualifying School graduates
- 2022 European Tour Qualifying School graduates
- 2024 European Tour Qualifying School graduates
- 2026 European Tour Qualifying School graduates
