= Linus Lilliedahl =

Swedish professional golfer

Personal information
- Full name: Linus Richard Lilliedahl
- Nationality: Sweden
- Born: 15 February 1994 (age 32) Nyköping, Sweden
- Height: 6 ft 1 in (185 cm)
- Weight: 185 lb (84 kg)

Career
- Sport: Golf
- College: University of Missouri
- Turned professional: 2018
- Current tour: PGA Tour Latinoamérica
- Former tour: Nordic Golf League

Achievements and awards
- PGA of Sweden Future Fund Award: 2020

Linus Lilliedahl (born 15 February 1994) is a Swedish professional golfer who plays on the PGA Tour Latinoamérica. In 2022, he was runner-up at the Argentine Open and the Argentina Classic.

== Early life and amateur career ==
Lilliedahl was born in Nyköping and grew up in Sandviken. With both his parents golf instructors, he was a confident golfer by age three. At 15, he collected a title on the Skandia Tour, the domestic junior circuit.

Lilliedahl played college golf the University of Missouri between 2014 and 2017. Playing with the Missouri Tigers men's golf team he won the Tiger Intercollegiate his senior year, beating Hayden Buckley by one stroke. He was named Academic All-American in 2016 and 2017 and was on the Southeastern Conference Honor Roll in 2016 and 2017.

== Professional career ==
Lilliedahl turned professional in 2018 and joined the Nordic Golf League. In 2019, he lost a playoff at the Landeryd Masters, and recorded a further five top-10 finishes.

Lilliedahl joined the PGA Tour Latinoamérica in 2020 after earning his playing privileges with a T4 finish at the PTLA Qualifying Tournament in Fort Lauderdale. The tour cancelled for much of 2020 and 2021 due to the COVID-19 pandemic, he played in the LocaliQ Series in the United States. His best result was a tie for 4th at The Classic at Callaway Gardens, two shots out of the Stoney Crouch-Hayden Shieh playoff that Crouch won.

In the inaugural event of the 2023 PGA Tour Latinoamérica season, he held the lead at the Visa Open de Argentina and ultimately finished runner-up; one stroke behind Zack Fischer. The following week, he finished runner-up at the Neuquen Argentina Classic; three strokes behind Cristóbal del Solar. By the conclusion of the Argentina Swing in March, he topped the seventh edition of the Zurich Argentina Swing ranking ahead of Chandler Blanchet.

== Amateur wins ==
- 2009 Skandia Tour Regional #5 - Dalarna
- 2017 Tiger Intercollegiate
