= The Spirit International Amateur Golf Championship =

The Spirit International
Tournament information
- Location: Trinity, Texas
- Established: 2001
- Course: Whispering Pines Golf Club
- Par: 72
- Length: 7,473 yd (6,833 m)
- Format: Best ball
- Month played: November

Current champion
- England

The Spirit International Amateur Golf Championship is a biennial amateur golf tournament which takes place in alternating years with the World Amateur Team Championships. The competition consists 20 countries represented by teams of four (two men and two women) and takes place at the Whispering Pines Golf Club, located 80 miles outside of Houston in Trinity, Texas.

Added in 2013, the winner of the individual men's competition receives a sponsor exemption to the PGA Tour’s Crowne Plaza Invitational at Colonial.

== Format ==
Teammates compete in a 72-hole best ball competition in which medals are awarded to the top three places in each of the five following categories; International Team (combined men's and women's teams), men's team, women's team, men's individual, and women's individual. The winners of the men's and women's individual competitions are determined by the player with the most birdies and eagles.

== Team selection ==
The majority of the participating countries are invited based on the previous year's World Amateur Team Championship combined results. Each nation then establishes its own selection criteria to determine the best individual participants available. In 2009, the field consisted of 76 National Champions. Notable past champions who have gone on to become established professionals include; Brandt Snedeker, Martin Kaymer, Jordan Spieth, Paula Creamer, and Lorena Ochoa.

== Results ==
=== Overall champions ===
Year	Winning team	Score	Runner(s)-up	Score	Winning team members
2024	England	−44	South Korea; Spain	−5	Dominic Clemons, Matthew Dodd-Berry, Nellie Ong, Patience Rhodes
2021	United States	−28	Canada	−7	Sam Bennett, Rachel Heck, James Piot, Rose Zhang
2019	France	−37	Norway; South Korea	−35	Adrien Pendaries, Julien Sale, Candice Mahé, Pauline Roussin-Bouchard
2017	Not held – club hosted charity events for Hurricane Harvey relief efforts instead				
2015	United States	−38	Mexico	−37	Philip Barbaree, Will Zalatoris, Mariel Galdiano, Hannah O'Sullivan
2013	United States	−33	France	−27	Jordan Niebrugge, Scottie Scheffler, Ally McDonald, Ashlan Ramsey
2011	United States	−31	Mexico; Argentina	−21	Kelly Kraft, Nathan Smith, Austin Ernst, Emily Tubert
2009	United States	−45	South Korea	−41	Jordan Spieth, Ben Martin, Jennifer Johnson, Lexi Thompson
2007	England	−32	South Korea; United States	−30	Gary Boyd, Danny Willett, Liz Bennett, Naomi Edwards
2005	England	−43	South Africa; United States	−35	Oliver Fisher, Jamie Moul, Sophie Walker, Felicity Johnson
2003	United States	−53	Australia	−37	Brandt Snedeker, Matt Rosenfeld, Paula Creamer, Jane Park
2001	Mexico	−51	South Korea	−44	Alberto Valenzuela, Maruricio Mendez, Lorena Ochoa, Violeta Retamoza

USA has won 6 matches, England 2, and France and Mexico 1 each.

=== Team champions ===
Year	Men		Women	
Year	Team	Players	Team	Players
2024	England (tie); Mexico	Dominic Clemons & Matthew Dodd-Berry; Gerardo Gomez & Omar Morales	Denmark	Emma Bunch & Marie Madsen
2021	Sweden	Albin Bergström & Hugo Townsend	United States	Rachel Heck & Rose Zhang
2019	United States	Cole Hammer & Andy Ogletree	South Korea	Jeong Hyun Lee & Ina Yoon
2017	Not held			
2015	United States	Philip Barbaree & Will Zalatoris	Mexico	María Fassi & Ana Paula Valdes
2013	United States	Scottie Scheffler & Jordan Niebrugge	France	Mathilda Cappeliez & Eva Gilly
2011	United States	Kelly Kraft & Nathan Smith	South Korea	Kim Hyoo-joo & Baek Kyu-jung
2009	Italy	Andrea Pavan & Matteo Manassero	United States	Lexi Thompson & Jennifer Johnson
2007	England	Gary Boyd & Danny Willett	South Korea	Kim Sei-young & Yang Soo-jim
2005	Germany	Martin Kaymer & Stefan Kirstein	England	Felicity Johnson & Sophie Walker
2003	United States	Mathew Rosenfeld & Brandt Snedeker	United States	Paula Creamer & Jane Park
2001	Austria	Thomas Kogler & Martin Wiegele	Mexico	Lorena Ochoa & Violeta Retamoza

=== Individual champions ===
Year	Men	Women
2024	(Australia) Josiah Gilbert	(Spain) Carla Bernat Escuder
2021	(United States) Sam Bennett	(United States) Rose Zhang
2019	(Australia) Jack Trent	(South Korea) Lee Jeong-hyun
2017	Not held	
2015	(United States) Will Zalatoris	(Mexico) María Fassi
2013	(France) Julien Brun (Finland) Toni Hakula (Sweden) Daniel Jennevret (United States) Jordan Niebrugge (United States) Scottie Scheffler	(Canada) Brooke Henderson
2011	(Canada) Mackenzie Hughes (United States) Kelly Kraft (Mexico) Carlos Ortiz (Belgium) Thomas Pieters (South Africa) Ruan de Smidt (United States) Nathan Smith	(Argentina) Victoria Tanco
2009	(South Korea) Chae Bum-geun	(United States) Lexi Thompson
2007	(England) Danny Willett	(South Korea) Yang Soo-jim
2005	(Germany) Stefan Kirstein	(Sweden) Pernilla Lindberg
2003	(Thailand) Chinarat Padungsil	(United States) Paula Creamer
2001	(United States) Robert Hamilton	(Mexico) Lorena Ochoa
