= Cutter & Buck =

Sportswear manufacturer

Coordinates: 47.648651°N 122.348944°W

Cutter & Buck Inc.
- Company type: Private
- Traded as: Nasdaq: CBUK
- Industry: Sportswear
- Founded: 1990; 36 years ago
- Headquarters: Seattle, Washington, U.S.
- Owner: New Wave Group AB
- Website: www.cutterbuck.com

Cutter & Buck Inc. is a manufacturer of upscale clothing for golf and other sports. Founded in 1990, the company went public in 1995 and was sold to New Wave Group AB, a Swedish-based corporation, on April 13, 2007.

The company sells its products primarily in the golf and corporate clothing markets in over twenty-five countries around the world, and has been recognized for its sponsorship of Swedish golfer Annika Sörenstam. It also sells into the collegiate clothing market and in 2005, commenced a consumer-direct catalogue and e-commerce site. In the mid-nineties, Cutter & Buck became a founding member of the SA 8000 Social Accountability Platform, which holds its members to a code of conduct in outsourced manufacturing and domestic operations.

Originally founded by Harvey Jones and Joey Rodolfo, Cutter & Buck's headquarters are now at 101 Elliott Avenue West in the Lower Queen Anne neighborhood of Seattle, Washington. From April 2, 2014, until present, Cutter & Buck's CEO is Joel Freet.

== Wire Fraud ==
In 2003, Cutter & Buck's former CFO, Stephen S. Lowber, pleaded guilty to felony wire fraud relating to lying about the company's revenue in 2000. The Cutter & Buck corporation paid no fines for these misstatements; however, it did agree with the SEC to stronger accounting practices.
