= Indoor Golf Group Challenge =

Tournament information
- Location: Vesterby, Sweden
- Established: 2022
- Course: Landeryds Golfklubb
- Par: 71
- Length: 6,798 yards (6,216 m)
- Tour: Challenge Tour
- Format: Stroke play
- Prize fund: €270,000
- Month played: August

Tournament record score
- Aggregate: 263 Max Rottluff (2023)
- To par: −21 as above

Current champion
- (Sweden) Joakim Lagergren

Location map
- Location in Sweden

The Indoor Golf Group Challenge is a golf tournament on the Challenge Tour. It will first be played in 2022 in Helsingborg, Sweden. It was the last of two Challenge Tour events held in Sweden in August 2022.

The tournament is held at Allerum Golf Club, home also to the Allerum Open on the LET Access Series.

== Winners ==
Year	Winner	Score	To par	Margin of victory	Runners-up
2024	(Sweden) Joakim Lagergren	272	−12	1 stroke	(Sweden) Jesper Sandborg
2023	(Germany) Max Rottluff	263	−21	3 strokes	(Denmark) Jeppe Kristian Andersen (Sweden) Jesper Svensson
2022	(Sweden) Mikael Lindberg	196 (Note: Shortened to 54 holes due to rain.)	−17	3 strokes	(France) Robin Sciot-Siegrist (England) Steven Tiley (Denmark) Nicolai Tinning
