= Adam Wallin =

Swedish professional golfer (born 2001)

Personal information
- Nationality: Sweden
- Born: 7 December 2001 (age 24) Ulricehamn, Sweden
- Height: 5 ft 11 in (1.80 m)

Career
- Sport: Golf
- College: Ohio State University
- Turned professional: 2024
- Current tours: European Tour; Nordic Golf League
- Former tour: Challenge Tour
- Professional wins: 5

Achievements and awards
- Swedish Golf Tour Order of Merit winner: 2025
- Nordic Golf League Order of Merit winner: 2025

Adam Wallin (born 7 December 2001) is a Swedish professional golfer and Challenge Tour player. As an amateur, he was runner-up at the 2022 Eisenhower Trophy and won three medals in European championships.

== Amateur career ==
Wallin had a successful amateur career and was runner-up at the 2018 Fairhaven Trophy and the 2019 Grand Prix de PACA. He played for the Continent of Europe team at the Jacques Leglise Trophy and St Andrews Trophy, and represented Sweden at the European Boys' Team Championship twice, securing two bronze medals.

Wallin accepted a scholarship to Ohio State University and spent four years playing with the Ohio State Buckeyes men's golf team 2020–2024. He held the 54-hole individual lead at the 2024 NCAA Championship after rounds of 68-74-69, and carded a final round 76 to finish in eighth place, just two shots behind winner Hiroshi Tai. He defeated top-ranked Gordon Sargent in extra hole in the team's quarterfinal match to send the Buckeyes to the semifinals. He was named All-American as a senior.

Wallin won silver at the 2022 European Amateur Team Championship in England, after Sweden lost the final to Spain 4 1/2 to 2 1/2. He finished in second place behind Italy and ahead of the United States in third at the 2022 Eisenhower Trophy, in a team together with Ludvig Åberg and Tobias Jonsson.

Wallin tied for 3rd in the 2022 Göteborg Open, a Nordic Golf League event, and played in the Volvo Car Scandinavian Mixed at Vasatorp Golf Club on the 2024 European Tour, where he finished tied 29th.

== Professional career ==
Wallin turned professional after graduating in 2024 and joined the Nordic Golf League, where he was runner-up at Holtsmark Open in Norway.

In 2025, he registered five runner-up finishes and three wins by August, to secure immediate "battlefield" promotion to the Challenge Tour. He kept his momentum into the 2026 Challenge Tour, where he recorded three top-6 finishes in his first six starts, including a tie for 3rd at the Danish Golf Challenge, two strokes behind winner Tapio Pulkkanen.

In 2026, Wallin shot a final round 62 to hold the clubhouse lead and ultimately finish runner-up behind compatriot Christofer Blomstrand at the Scottish Challenge.

== Amateur wins ==
- 2016 Skandia Tour Regional #5
- 2017 Skydda Junior Open, Hulta Junior Open, Skandia Tour Future #5
- 2018 GolfTech Tour #4
- 2022 Colleton River Collegiate, Cal Poly Invitational

== Professional wins (5) ==
=== Nordic Golf League wins (5) ===
| No. | Date | Tournament | Winning score | Margin of victory | Runner(s)-up |
|---|---|---|---|---|---|
| 1 | 16 Feb 2025 | GolfStar Winter Series (Links) | −17 (68-66-63=197) | Playoff | (Sweden) Tobias Edén |
| 2 | 5 Jul 2025 | Enklare att vara proffs | −16 (69-63-68=200) | Playoff | (Norway) Jarand Ekeland Arnøy |
| 3 | 15 Aug 2025 | Skåne Challenge | −10 (68-68-67=203) | 1 stroke | (Denmark) William Gøth-Rasmussen, (Denmark) Mads Laage |
| 4 | 9 Oct 2025 | Destination Gotland Open | −19 (67-65-65=197) | 6 strokes | (Denmark) Jamie Tofte Nielsen |
| 5 | 19 Apr 2026 | Sand Valley Spring Series Championship | −21 (66-67-65=198) | Playoff | (Denmark) Anders Emil Ejlersen, (Denmark) Sebastian Friedrichsen |

== Team appearances ==
Amateur

- Jacques Léglise Trophy (representing Continental Europe): 2018, 2019 (winners)
- European Boys' Team Championship (representing Sweden): 2018
- Junior Golf World Cup (representing Sweden): 2019
- St Andrews Trophy (representing the Continent of Europe): 2022
- Eisenhower Trophy (representing Sweden): 2022
- European Amateur Team Championship (representing Sweden): 2021, 2022

== See also ==
- 2026 Challenge Tour graduates
