= 2017 Nordic Golf League =

Golf tour season

2017 Nordic Golf League season
- Duration: 14 February 2017 – 14 October 2017
- Number of official events: 23
- Most wins: (Iceland) Axel Bóasson (2) (Sweden) Daniel Jennevret (2) (Sweden) Per Längfors (2) (Sweden) Niklas Lemke (2) (Sweden) Åke Nilsson (2)
- Order of Merit: (Iceland) Axel Bóasson

The 2017 Nordic Golf League was the 19th season of the Nordic Golf League, a third-tier tour recognised by the European Tour.

== Schedule ==
The following table lists official events during the 2017 season.

Date	Tournament	Host country	Purse	Winner (Note: The number in brackets after each winner's name is the number of Nordic Golf League events they had won up to and including that tournament. It is rare for someone to accumulate many wins on the Nordic Golf League as success at this level usually leads to promotion to the Challenge Tour.)	OWGR points
16 Feb	Mediter Real Estate Masters	Spain	DKr 375,000	(Germany) Florian Fritsch (1)	4
21 Feb	PGA Catalunya Resort Championship	Spain	DKr 375,000	(France) Mathieu Fenasse (1)	4
27 Feb	Lumine Lakes Open	Spain	€55,000	(Sweden) Mikael Lundberg (1)	4
4 Mar	Lumine Hills Open	Spain	€55,000	(Sweden) Oscar Lengdén (2)	4
5 May	Bravo Tours Open	Denmark	DKr 300,000	(England) Alex Wrigley (1)	4
12 May	Kellers Park Masters	Denmark	€40,000	(Sweden) Åke Nilsson (6)	4
20 May	Stora Hotellet Bryggan Fjällbacka Open	Sweden	SKr 400,000	(Norway) Elias Bertheussen (3)	4
26 May	Star for Life PGA Championship	Sweden	SKr 400,000	(Sweden) Niklas Lemke (2)	4
2 Jun	Jyske Bank PGA Championship	Denmark	DKr 300,000	(Denmark) Oskar Ambrosius (a) (1)	4
16 Jun	Tinderbox Charity Challenge	Denmark	DKr 411,800	(Sweden) Christopher Feldborg Nielsen (2)	4
22 Jun	Borre Open	Norway	SKr 350,000	(Sweden) Per Längfors (2)	4
1 Jul	SM Match	Sweden	SKr 400,000	(Iceland) Axel Bóasson (1)	4
8 Jul	Lannalodge Open	Sweden	SKr 400,000	(Finland) Antti Ahokas (4)	4
28 Jul	Gamle Fredrikstad Open	Norway	SKr 350,000	(Sweden) Daniel Jennevret (4)	4
4 Aug	Made in Denmark Qualifier	Denmark	DKr 300,000	(Sweden) Åke Nilsson (7)	4
12 Aug	Isaberg Open	Sweden	SKr 350,000	(Sweden) Anton Wejshag (3)	4
27 Aug	Landeryd Masters	Sweden	SKr 400,000	(Sweden) Daniel Jennevret (5)	4
2 Sep	Polarputki Finnish Open	Finland	€40,000	(Denmark) Victor Østerby (1)	4
9 Sep	Willis Towers Watson Masters	Denmark	DKr 300,000	(Sweden) Per Längfors (3)	4
22 Sep	12 Twelve Championship	Denmark	DKr 300,000	(Iceland) Axel Bóasson (2)	4
30 Sep	GolfUppsala Open	Sweden	SKr 400,000	(Finland) Lauri Ruuska (1)	4
7 Oct	Race to HimmerLand	Denmark	DKr 375,000	(Sweden) Ludwig Nordeklint (2)	4
14 Oct	SGT Tourfinal Kristianstad Åhus Open	Sweden	SKr 450,000	(Sweden) Niklas Lemke (3)	4

== Order of Merit ==
The Order of Merit was titled as the Road to Europe and was based on tournament results during the season, calculated using a points-based system. The top five players on the Order of Merit earned status to play on the 2018 Challenge Tour.

Position	Player	Points	Status earned
1	(Iceland) Axel Bóasson	45,260	Promoted to Challenge Tour
2	(Sweden) Christopher Feldborg Nielsen	36,776	Promoted to Challenge Tour
3	(Sweden) Niklas Lemke	30,789	Promoted to Challenge Tour
4	(Sweden) Åke Nilsson	30,400	Promoted to Challenge Tour
5	(Denmark) Victor Østerby	25,397	Promoted to Challenge Tour
6	(Norway) Aksel Olsen	25,135	
7	(Sweden) Per Längfors	24,482	
8	(Iceland) Haraldur Magnús	23,868	
9	(Finland) Antti Ahokas	22,195	
10	(Sweden) Daniel Jennevret	20,393	

== See also ==
- 2017 Danish Golf Tour
- 2017 Swedish Golf Tour
