= Victor Sidal Svendsen =

Danish professional golfer (born 1998)

Personal information
- Full name: Victor Hougaard Sidal Svendsen
- Nationality: Denmark
- Born: 2 July 1998 (age 28) Copenhagen, Denmark

Career
- Sport: Golf
- Turned professional: 2022
- Current tour: Challenge Tour
- Former tour: Nordic Golf League
- Professional wins: 4

Victor Hougaard Sidal Svendsen (born 2 July 1998) is a Danish professional golfer and Challenge Tour player. In 2025, he was runner-up at the Challenge de España and D+D Real Czech Challenge.

== Professional career ==
Svendsen turned professional in 2022 and joined the Nordic Golf League, where he recorded his first victory at the 2023 Stora Hotellet Fjällbacka Open, a stroke ahead of amateur Albert Hansson.

In 2024, he won three times including the Finnish Open, to earn immediate promotion to the Challenge Tour in August.

On the 2025 Challenge Tour, he was runner-up at the Challenge de España and D+D Real Czech Challenge.

== Amateur wins ==
- 2019 Mølleåen Open
- 2022 Asserbo Cup

== Professional wins (4) ==
=== Nordic Golf League wins (4) ===
No.	Date	Tournament	Winning score	Margin of victory	Runner(s)-up
1	18 May 2023	Stora Hotellet Fjällbacka Open	−20 (64-69-63=196)	2 strokes	(Sweden) Albert Hansson (a)
2	18 Feb 2024	GolfStar Winter Series (Links)	−12 (72-66-66=204)	1 stroke	(Sweden) Albin Bergström
3	16 Aug 2024	Skåne Challenge	−9 (70-70-67=207)	Playoff	(Denmark) Jacob Worm Agerschou, (Sweden) Christopher Sahlström
4	24 Aug 2024	Timberwise Finnish Open	−7 (71-68-70=209)	1 stroke	(Denmark) Anders Emil Ejlersen, (Finland) Ville Virkkala (a)

== Team appearances ==
Amateur

- European Nations Cup – Copa Sotogrande (representing Denmark): 2022
