= Tobias Edén =

Swedish professional golfer (born 1995)

Personal information
- Full name: Nils Tobias Jensen Edén
- Nationality: Sweden
- Born: 7 October 1995 (age 31) Karlstad, Sweden
- Height: 6 ft 3 in (1.91 m)
- Spouse: Karin (m. 2026)
- Children: 2

Career
- Sport: Golf
- College: Arizona State University
- Turned professional: 2018
- Current tour: Challenge Tour
- Former tours: European Tour; Nordic Golf League
- Professional wins: 5

Achievements and awards
- Swedish Junior Tour Order of Merit winner: 2012

Tobias Jensen Edén (born 7 October 1995) is a Swedish professional golfer and European Tour player.

== Early life and amateur career ==
Edén was born in Karlstad and had success on the junior circuit. In 2012 he won the Swedish Junior Matchplay Championship and topped the Swedish Junior Tour Order of Merit, earning the Annika Sörenstam Trophy.

He joined the National Team and won the 2012 European Boys' Team Championship, as well as the bronze at the 2015 European Amateur Team Championship.

Edén accepted a golf scholarship to Arizona State University and played with the Arizona State Sun Devils men's golf team between 2014 and 2018. He graduated with a degree in business communication.

== Professional career ==
Edén turned professional in 2018 and joined the Nordic Golf League where he won his first tournament, the Frederikshavn Championship, in Denmark in 2021. He finished tied 12th at the 2022 Dormy Open on the Challenge Tour.

In November 2022, he shot a 61 in the third round to finish 11th at European Tour Qualifying School, earning a place on the European Tour for 2023. In his rookie European Tour season, he missed 20 cuts in 21 starts. His 17 consecutive European Tour cuts approached the record of 21 set by Justin Rose and Nick Dougherty.

Playing on the 2025 Nordic Golf League, Edén finished second in the rankings behind Adam Wallin to graduate to the 2026 Challenge Tour. After a hole-in-one and a 65 in round three he led the 2026 Irish Challenge at Killeen Castle with 9 holes remaining, only to produce 3 bogeys on the final nine to ultimately finish tied 6th, 3 strokes behind winner Justin Harding.

== Personal life ==
In 2026, Edén married his fiancé Karin Jensen and changed his family name to Jensen Edén. The couple welcomed their second son in May 2025.

== Amateur wins ==
- 2008 Skandia Cup Riksfinal P-13, Skandia Tour Regional #3 - Bohuslän/Dalsland
- 2009 Karlstad Junior Masters
- 2010 Skandia Cup Riksfinal P-15, Skandia Tour Riks #6 - Östergötland
- 2012 Swedish Junior Matchplay Championship
- 2013 Skandia Tour Elit #1 Pojkar

== Professional wins (5) ==
=== Nordic Golf League wins (4) ===
No.	Date	Tournament	Winning score	Margin of victory	Runner(s)-up
1	6 Aug 2021	Frederikshavn Championship	−5 (66-76-69=211)	2 strokes	(Denmark) Zander Lui Rivas
2	1 Mar 2025	Infinitum Championship	−17 (63-65-66=194)	Playoff	(Denmark) Jeppe Kristian Andersen
3	23 Apr 2025	Sand Valley Spring Series Final	−23 (61-66-69=196)	2 strokes	(Sweden) Adam Wallin
4	26 Sep 2025	FootJoy Championship	−11 (67-71-70=208)	4 strokes	(Denmark) August Thor Høst, (Norway) Tom Røed Karlsen, (Sweden) Wesley Monier

=== Other wins (1) ===
- 2018 Hovås Open

== Team appearances ==
Amateur

- European Boys' Team Championship (representing Sweden): 2011, 2012 (winners), 2013
- Duke of York Young Champions Trophy (representing Sweden): 2012
- Junior Golf World Cup (representing Sweden): 2013
- European Amateur Team Championship (representing Sweden): 2014, 2015

== See also ==
- 2022 European Tour Qualifying School graduates
