= Hugo Townsend =

Swedish professional golfer (born 1999)

Personal information
- Full name: Hugo Austin Townsend
- Nationality: Sweden
- Born: 18 January 1999 (age 27) Dublin, Ireland

Career
- Sport: Golf
- College: Boise State University; University of Mississippi
- Turned professional: 2023
- Current tour: European Tour
- Former tours: Challenge Tour; Nordic Golf League
- Professional wins: 2

Number of wins by tour
- Challenge Tour: 1
- Other: 1

Achievements and awards
- Mountain West Golfer of the Year: 2021, 2022

Hugo Austin Townsend (born 18 January 1999) is a Swedish professional golfer. As an amateur, he earned co-medalist honors in stroke play at the 2021 U.S. Amateur. As a professional, he qualified for the 2026 European Tour season through the 2025 Challenge Tour rankings.

== Early life and amateur career ==
Townsend was born in Dublin, Ireland. He grew up in Boden, Sweden where he moved at age 6 with his family, his Swedish mother Sofia and his English father Peter Townsend, a former PGA Tour golfer and two-time Ryder Cup player.

Townsend showed a talent for golf early, winning 16 tournaments and recording 11 runner-up finishes on the regional junior circuits between 2012 and 2015, becoming the top ranked player in Sweden for his age group. He won the 2012 Skandia Cup national final by 18 strokes ahead of David Nyfjäll in second.

Townsend was a member of the Swedish National Team from 2016 to 2018, and helped lead the team to a fourth-place finish at the European Boys' Team Championship at La Manga Club, Spain in the summer of 2017. In the semi-final, he lost his Sunday singles match to Oliver Hundebøll on the 19th hole.

He appeared in the European Amateur Team Championship twice. He helped the team earn a silver medal in 2022 at Royal St George's Golf Club, England. Sweden lost in the final against Spain, despite Townsend and David Nyfjäll beat Spain's David Puig and Josele Ballester, 1 up, in the first foursome game. At the same venue, Townsend's father Peter had finished tied 19th in the Open Championship 41 years earlier.

== Collegiate career ==
Townsend accepted a scholarship to Boise State University and played with the Boise State Broncos men's golf team from 2018 to 2022. He was named Mountain West Conference Golfer of the Year in 2021 and 2022, the first Bronco to earn the honor twice. In 2021, he won the Duck Invitational and was named All-American for the 2020–21 season. He was runner-up at the 2021 Mountain West Championship, after losing a playoff on the second hole.

He earned co-medalist honors in stroke play and was the only European to reach the round of 16 at the 2021 U.S. Amateur, where he lost to Nick Gabrelcik on the 19th hole. He represented the International team at the 2021 Arnold Palmer Cup held at Rich Harvest Farms in Illinois, where he tied his Sunday singles match with Sam Bennett. Representing Sweden at the 2021 Spirit International Amateur in Texas, he won the men's team gold together with Albin Bergström.

Townsend enrolled at the University of Mississippi as a graduate student in 2022 and played with the Ole Miss Rebels men's golf team. He finished runner-up at the All-American Intercollegiate with an overall score of 210 (–6) to help his team win the tournament. He was one of the top 25 golfers to be named by the foundation to the Haskins Award Watch List ahead of the 2022–23 season.

== Professional career ==
Townsend turned professional in June 2023, following the Volvo Car Scandinavian Mixed on the European Tour, a mixed event with men and women playing from different tees, where he finished 11th overall and 9th among the men, after a final round of eight under par 64 at Ullna G&CC outside Stockholm, Sweden. In his second start as a professional, he shot an eight under par second round of 64 to lead by a stroke at the halfway point of the Le Vaudreuil Golf Challenge in France, ultimately tying for 17th.

Townsend finished 7th in the 2024 Nordic Golf League rankings to earn promotion to the Challenge Tour, where he was on course to secure his maiden title at the 2025 Challenge de Cádiz, but bogeyed three of his final four holes to finish tied for third, two strokes behind the winner. In September 2025, Townsend won the GAC Rosa Challenge Tour tournament in Poland. He ended the Challenge Tour season finishing 16th in the rankings and qualified for the 2026 European Tour season.

Townsend made the cut in eleven of his first fourteen tournaments on the 2026 European Tour season, with four top-20 finishes, earning €130,383 in prize money before end of May 2026, standing 93rd on the Race-to-Dubai-rankings. Despite his strong start of the season, Townsend couldn't keep his position and finished the season outside the top 100 of the 2026 rankings.

== Amateur wins ==
- 2011 Skandia Cup Riksfinal P13
- 2012 NVGF Junior Tour #1, NVGF Junior Tour #2, NVGF Junior Tour #3, Skandia Cup Riksfinal P13
- 2013 NVGF Junior Tour #1, NVGF Junior Tour #2, NVGF Junior Tour #4, NVGF Junior Tour Final
- 2014 NVGF Junior Tour #1, NVGF Junior Tour #3, NVGF Junior Tour #4, NVGF Junior Tour #5, NVGF Junior Tour #6
- 2015 NVGF Junior Tour #3, NVGF Junior Tour #4
- 2021 Duck Invitational, Spirit International Amateur (with Albin Bergström)

== Professional wins (2) ==
=== Challenge Tour wins (1) ===
No.	Date	Tournament	Winning score	Margin of victory	Runner-up
1	7 Sep 2025	GAC Rosa Challenge Tour	−15 (69-63-64-69=265)	2 strokes	(Germany) Anton Albers

=== Nordic Golf League wins (1) ===
No.	Date	Tournament	Winning score	Margin of victory	Runner-up
1	27 Sep 2024	Titleist Championship	−5 (70-71=141) (Note: Shortened to 36 holes due to weather.)	Playoff	(Sweden) Joakim Wikström

== Team appearances ==
Amateur

- European Boys' Team Championship (representing Sweden): 2017
- European Amateur Team Championship (representing Sweden): 2021, 2022
- Arnold Palmer Cup (representing the International Team): 2021
- Spirit International Amateur (representing Sweden): 2021 (winners)

== See also ==
- 2025 Challenge Tour graduates
