= David Nyfjäll =

Swedish professional golfer (born 1999)

Personal information
- Full name: David Andreas Nyfjäll
- Nationality: Sweden
- Born: 26 January 1999 (age 27) Uppsala, Sweden

Career
- Sport: Golf
- College: Northwestern University
- Turned professional: 2023
- Current tour: European Tour
- Former tours: Challenge Tour; Nordic Golf League
- Professional wins: 3

Best results in major championships
- Masters Tournament: DNP
- PGA Championship: DNP
- U.S. Open: CUT: 2023
- The Open Championship: DNP

Achievements and awards
- Big Ten Freshman of the Year: 2019
- Byron Nelson Award: 2023
- Swedish Golf Tour Order of Merit winner: 2026

David Andreas Nyfjäll (born 26 January 1999) is a Swedish professional golfer. As an amateur, he was part of the teams winning the 2017 Jacques Léglise Trophy, the 2019 European Amateur Team Championship and the 2019 Arnold Palmer Cup.

== Amateur career ==
Nyfjäll won his first international title at the 2013 Finnish Junior International Championship and was a semi-finalist at the 2016 Boys Amateur Championship at Muirfield in Scotland. In 2017, he finished third at the German Boys Open, and in 2018 third at the Lytham Trophy.

In 2018, Nyfjäll became the first male player to win both the Swedish Junior Matchplay Championship and the Swedish Junior Strokeplay Championship in the same year. Jonas Blixt had previously won both tournaments, but not in the same season.

Nyfjäll appeared for the National Team at the European Boys' Team Championship in 2017, finishing fourth. He was a member of the winning Continental European Team in the 2017 Jacques Léglise Trophy against Great Britain and Ireland. He appeared in the European Amateur Team Championship four times and won the 2019 event at Ljunghusen Golf Club with Albin Bergström, Vincent Norrman, Christoffer Pålsson, Pontus Nyholm and Ludvig Åberg. Nyfjäll won the bronze at the 2020 event in the Netherlands together with Gustav Andersson, Albin Bergström and Vincent Norrman.

He played in the 2019 Scandinavian Invitation on the European Tour and made the cut.

Nyfjäll advanced to the round of 16 at the 2021 U.S. Amateur at Oakmont Country Club, after triumphing in a 12-man playoff for the last match play spot.

== College career ==
Nyfjäll accepted a scholarship to Northwestern University and played with the Northwestern Wildcats men's golf team between 2018 and 2023. He was named Big Ten Conference Freshman of the Year after two individual titles and a 71.72 stroke average, the lowest average from any first-year in program history, including Luke Donald. He helped secure the 2019 Arnold Palmer Cup for the international team.

In 2022, Nyfjäll won the Big Ten Championship, the only golfer in the 72-man field to finish the weekend under par, becoming Northwestern's first medalist at the event since David Lipsky in 2010.

As a graduating senior, Nyfjäll won the 2023 Byron Nelson Award from the Golf Coaches Association of America, earning him a start at the 2024 CJ Cup Byron Nelson.

== Professional career ==
Nyfjäll turned professional mid-2023 after he earned a spot in the 2023 U.S. Open at the qualifier in Columbus, Ohio, and made his professional debut at the U.S Open at Los Angeles Country Club, where he missed the cut after rounds of 73 and 74. He spent the rest of the season on the Challenge Tour, where his best finish was a tie for 6th at the Indoor Golf Group Challenge.

== Amateur wins ==
- 2013 Finnish Junior International Championship Boys 14, Skandia Tour Regional #3 Gästrike-Hälsinge
- 2014 Skandia Cup Riksfinal P15
- 2015 Vassunda Junior Open
- 2016 Callaway Cup
- 2017 Swedish Junior Matchplay Championship, Viksjö Junior Open, Salem Junior Open, Junior Masters Invitational - Final
- 2018 Swedish Junior Matchplay Championship, Swedish Junior Strokeplay Championship, GolfTech Tour 1, Chatham Hills Collegiate, UNCG Grandover Collegiate
- 2021 GCAA Summers Series - Indiana
- 2022 Big Ten Championship

== Professional wins (3) ==
=== Nordic Golf League wins (3) ===
No.	Date	Tournament	Winning score	Margin of victory	Runner(s)-up
1	30 May 2025	Smørum Open	−17 (62-65-66=193)	3 strokes	(Denmark) Jeppe Kristian Andersen
2	29 Aug 2026	Finnish Open	−17 (69-62-65=196)	2 strokes	(Denmark) Jesper Hagborg Asp, (Denmark) Morten Ørum Madsen, (Sweden) Sebastian Petersen, (Sweden) Albin Tidén
3	4 Sep 2026	Crona Software Halland Open	−14 (66-64-66=196)	1 stroke	(Sweden) Sebastian Petersen

== Results in major championships ==
Tournament	2023
Masters Tournament	
PGA Championship	
U.S. Open	CUT
The Open Championship	

Did not play

CUT = missed the halfway cut

== Team appearances ==
Amateur

- Jacques Léglise Trophy (representing Continental Europe): 2017 (winners)
- European Boys' Team Championship (representing Sweden): 2017
- European Amateur Team Championship (representing Sweden): 2018, 2019 (winners), 2020, 2021, 2022
- Arnold Palmer Cup (representing the International Team): 2019 (winners)

== See also ==
- 2026 European Tour Qualifying School graduates
