= Anton Karlsson (golfer) =

Swedish professional golfer

Personal information
- Full name: Karl Oskar Anton Karlsson
- Nationality: Sweden
- Born: 11 September 1993 (age 33) Uppsala, Sweden

Career
- Sport: Golf
- Turned professional: 2013
- Current tours: Sunshine Tour; Challenge Tour
- Former tours: European Tour; Nordic Golf League
- Professional wins: 12

Number of wins by tour
- Sunshine Tour: 1
- Challenge Tour: 1
- Other: 11

Karl Oskar Anton Karlsson (born 11 September 1993) is a Swedish professional golfer who has played on the European Tour. He won the 2020 RAM Cape Town Open on the Challenge Tour. His best finish on the European Tour was runner-up at the 2019 Commercial Bank Qatar Masters.

== Early life and amateur career ==
Karlsson started playing golf in the year 2000, when his father enrolled him in the junior golf academy at Vassunda Golf Club, near his home town of Uppsala. Following his success on tour, the club later made him Honorary Member.

Karlsson started competing on the junior circuits in 2007, and won his first of several titles on the Skandia Tour in his first season. He won the Vassunda Junior Open in the Junior Masters Invitational series in 2007 and 2012, and was runner-up in 2013 behind Adam Blommé, and again in 2014 when he lost a playoff to Viktor Jensen.

In 2014, he won the Junior Masters Invitational season finale. As an amateur, he also won a professional event in the SGF Golf Ranking series.

== Professional career ==
Karlsson attended the Nordic Golf League Q-School and turned professional towards the end of 2013. He joined the Nordic Golf League in 2014, and came close to claim a maiden title when he lost a playoff at the 2015 Danish PGA Championship. In 2016, he joined the Challenge Tour, where he recorded four top-10s and finished his first season ranked 37th.

He was one of the 2016 European Tour Qualifying School graduates and joined the European Tour as a 23-year-old rookie in 2017. He finished 190th on the money list and was relegated to the Challenge Tour for 2018, where he finished runner-up at the KPMG Trophy in Belgium, after losing a playoff to Pedro Figueiredo.

Karlsson was one of the 2018 European Tour Qualifying School graduates and moved back onto Europe's top tier once again. On the 2019 European Tour he was runner-up at the Commercial Bank Qatar Masters, two strokes behind Justin Harding, and finished ranked 136th. At the Swedish Challenge, he missed out on a place in the playoff by one stroke, and finished tied 3rd.

In March 2019, Karlsson reached a career-high world ranking of 288.

Again playing on the Challenge Tour, Karlsson clinched his maiden victory at the Sunshine Tour co-sanctioned RAM Cape Town Open in 2020, where he maintained the momentum from a bogey-free eight-under-par third round of 64 as he reeled off six birdies in seven holes from the 7th hole to move to the top of the leaderboard. With the win he moved to second place on the Road to Mallorca Rankings.

== Amateur wins ==
- 2007 Vassunda Junior Open, Skandia Tour Distrikt #5
- 2010 Skandia Tour Regional #6
- 2012 Vassunda Junior Open
- 2014 Junior Masters Invitational

== Professional wins (12) ==
=== Sunshine Tour wins (1) ===
No.	Date	Tournament	Winning score	Margin of victory	Runner-up
1	9 Feb 2020	RAM Cape Town Open^{1}	−14 (72-69-64-69=274)	1 stroke	(South Africa) Garrick Higgo

^{1}Co-sanctioned by the Challenge Tour

=== Challenge Tour wins (1) ===
No.	Date	Tournament	Winning score	Margin of victory	Runner-up
1	9 Feb 2020	RAM Cape Town Open^{1}	−14 (72-69-64-69=274)	1 stroke	(South Africa) Garrick Higgo

^{1}Co-sanctioned by the Sunshine Tour

Challenge Tour playoff record (0–1)

No.	Year	Tournament	Opponents	Result
1	2018	KPMG Trophy	(Portugal) Pedro Figueiredo, (Wales) Stuart Manley	Figueiredo won with birdie on first extra hole

=== Nordic Golf League wins (4) ===
No.	Date	Tournament	Winning score	Margin of victory	Runner(s)-up
1	5 May 2023	Golfkusten Blekinge	−14 (66-64-69=199)	2 strokes	(Iceland) Axel Bóasson
2	10 Oct 2024	Destination Gotland Open	−10 (65-72-69=206)	Playoff	(Sweden) Adam Guedra
3	28 Jun 2025	PGA of Sweden Championship Landeryd	−11 (68-71-72-64=275)	Playoff	(Sweden) Charlie Lindh, (Sweden) Adam Wallin
4	12 Jun 2026	Indoor Golf Group Göteborg Open	−6 (68-67-72=207)	Playoff	(Sweden) Lucas Augustsson, (Denmark) Joachim B. Hansen

=== Other wins (7) ===
- 2010 Kåbo Open (as an amateur)
- 2014 Ovako Bar Hagge Open (Swedish mini tour Future Series)
- 2014 Dormy Challenge
- 2015 District championship Uppland
- 2015 Frösåker Open
- 2015 Hårga Open (Swedish mini tour Future Series)
- 2020 Burvik Open

== See also ==
- 2016 European Tour Qualifying School graduates
- 2018 European Tour Qualifying School graduates
