= David Lundgren (golfer) =

Swedish professional golfer (born 2001)

Personal information
- Nationality: Sweden
- Born: 15 May 2001 (age 25) Ängelholm, Sweden

Career
- Sport: Golf
- Turned professional: 2024
- Current tour: Nordic Golf League
- Former tour: MENA Golf Tour
- Professional wins: 2

Achievements and awards
- Nordic Golf League Order of Merit winner: 2026

David Lundgren (born 15 May 2001) is a Swedish professional golfer. He was runner-up at the 2026 Dormy Open on the Challenge Tour. As an amateur, he won two medals in European championships with the national squad.

== Amateur career ==
Lundgren had a successful amateur career and won the bronze medal at the 2018 Swedish Junior Matchplay Championship. He played for the Continent of Europe team at the St Andrews Trophy, and represented Sweden at the European Boys' Team Championship, securing a bronze medal in 2019. He won silver at the 2022 European Amateur Team Championship in England, beating Alejandro Aguilera, 6 and 5, in the final as Sweden lost to Spain 4 1/2 to 2 1/2.

In 2021, Lundgren won the Latvian Amateur Open Championship and was runner-up at the Lithuanian International Junior Championship and Lithuanian Amateur Open Championship. Between 2022 and 2024, he recorded top-10 finishes in premier events around Europe, twice at the Scottish Amateur Stroke Play Championship, twice at the Spanish International Amateur Championship, and twice at the Welsh Open Stroke Play Championship. He finished 4th at the 2019 Austrian International Amateur Championship, and 3rd at the 2022 Welsh Open Stroke Play Championship.

== Professional career ==
Lundgren turned professional in late 2024. He finished third at Q-School to join the 2025 Nordic Golf League. In 2025, he also made six starts on the Challenge Tour, where his best finish was a tie for sixth at the Danish Golf Challenge. He was in contention at the Interwetten Open in Austria, sitting two strokes off the lead ahead of the final round.

Lundgren made five starts on the 2025–26 MENA Golf Tour, where he recorded two top-6 finishes in Egypt.

In 2026, he was runner-up at both GolfStar Winter Series events in Spain, and lost a playoff to Jesper Sandborg at the GolfPromote 25th Anniversary Open. He secured his maiden NGL win at the Samsø Festival Pro-Am in Denmark, and rose to the top of the Road to Europe ranking.

Lundgren shared the lead with Christofer Blomstrand going into the final day of the 2026 Dormy Open on the Challenge Tour, and ultimately finished runner-up two strokes behind his compatriot.

== Amateur wins ==
- 2014 Skandia Tour Skåne #2
- 2016 Skandia Tour Regional #3 Göteborg
- 2018 First Warsaw Club Championship Open
- 2019 West District Championship
- 2021 Latvian International Amateur Championship

== Professional wins (2) ==
=== Nordic Golf League wins (1) ===
No.	Date	Tournament	Winning score	Margin of victory	Runner-up
1	5 Jun 2026	Samsø Festival Pro-Am	−15 (66-69-66=201)	1 stroke	(Denmark) Magnus Østergaard

=== Other wins (1) ===
- 2024 Sjöbo Open (Future Series)

== Team appearances ==
Amateur

- European Boys' Team Championship (representing Sweden): 2019
- St Andrews Trophy (representing the Continent of Europe): 2022
- European Amateur Team Championship (representing Sweden): 2022, 2023
- European Nations Cup – Copa Sotogrande (representing Sweden): 2022, 2023
