= Swedish Golf Tour Final =

Destination Gotland Open
Tournament information
- Location: Västergarn, Sweden
- Established: 2005
- Course: Visby Golf Club
- Par: 72
- Length: 7,474 yards (6,834 m)
- Tours: Swedish Golf Tour; Nordic Golf League
- Format: Stroke play
- Prize fund: kr 600,000
- Month played: October

Tournament record score
- Aggregate: 197 Adam Wallin (2025)
- To par: −19 as above

Current champion
- (Sweden) Jesper Sandborg

Location map
- Location in Sweden

The Swedish Golf Tour Final, currently titled as the Destination Gotland Open, is a golf tournament played as the season-ending championship of the Swedish Golf Tour.

The Tour Final was introduced in the 2005 season, succeeding the Telia Grand Prix, a Challenge Tour event that had served as the season ending event for most years since 1996. The Swedish Golf Tour (women) had played the Telia Ladies Finale since 1997. Both were discontinued around the time tour sponsorship passed from Telia to Scandinavian Airlines and it became the SAS Masters Tour. After Nordea took over the sponsorship in 2011, the Tour Championship was reintroduced.

== Winners ==
Year	Tour (Note: NGL − Nordic Golf League; SWE − Swedish Golf Tour.)	Winner	Score	To par	Margin of victory	Runner(s)-up	Venue	Ref.
Destination Gotland Open
2026	NGL	(Sweden) Jesper Sandborg	205	−11	2 strokes	(Sweden) David Nyfjäll	Visby	
2025	NGL	(Sweden) Adam Wallin	197	−19	6 strokes	(Denmark) Jamie Tofte Nielsen	Visby	
2024	NGL	(Sweden) Anton Karlsson	206	−10	Playoff	(Sweden) Adam Guedra	Visby	
The No. 1 Tour Final in Golf
2023	NGL	(Denmark) Jonathan Gøth-Rasmussen	213	−3	2 strokes	(Iceland) Axel Bóasson	PGA Sweden National	
MoreGolf Mastercard Tour Final
2022	NGL	(Denmark) John Axelsen	200	−16	3 strokes	(Denmark) Jeppe Kristian Andersen (Denmark) August Thor Høst	PGA Sweden National	
2021	NGL	(Sweden) Sebastian Petersen	208	−8	2 strokes	(Sweden) Charlie Lindh	PGA Sweden National	
Lindbytvätten Tour Final
2020	NGL	(Denmark) Lasse Jensen	200	−16	1 stroke	(Sweden) Mikael Lindberg	Ekerum	
Tour Final
2019	NGL	(Sweden) Mikael Lindberg	198	−18	2 strokes	(Sweden) Björn Hellgren (Denmark) Niklas Nørgaard	Pärnu Bay	
Tourfinalen
2018	NGL	(Sweden) Jacob Glennemo	209	−7	2 strokes	(Norway) Aksel Olsen	Barsebäck	
SGT Tourfinal Kristianstad Åhus Open
2017	NGL	(Sweden) Niklas Lemke	211	−5	Playoff	(Iceland) Axel Bóasson (Sweden) Mikael Lindberg	Kristianstad	
Tourfinal Vellinge Open
2016	NGL	(Denmark) Mark Haastrup (2)	210	−6	Playoff	(Sweden) Niklas Lindström	Ljunghusen	
2015	NGL	(Denmark) Mark Haastrup	209	−7	3 strokes	(Sweden) Simon Forsström	Ljunghusen	
Tourfinal Svedala Open
2014	NGL	(Denmark) Mads Søgaard	203	−10	2 strokes	(Sweden) David Palm	Bokskogen	
2013	NGL	(Sweden) Jesper Billing	212	−4	1 stroke	(Sweden) Jesper Kennegård	Bokskogen	
Nordea Tour Championship
2012	NGL	(Sweden) Johan Carlsson	207	−9	Playoff	(Sweden) Pontus Leijon	Kungsbacka	
2011	NGL	(Sweden) Felix Fihn	207	−9	1 stroke	(Sweden) Benny Ahlenbäck	Vallda	
2007–2010: No tournament
Telia Tour Final
2006	SWE	(Sweden) Pontus Leijon	202	−11	4 strokes	(Sweden) Fredrik Hammarberg (Sweden) Robert Wahlin	Rya	
2005	SWE	(Sweden) Fredrik Söderström	207	−9	3 strokes	(Sweden) Johan Bjerhag	Barsebäck	
