= Per Längfors =

Swedish professional golfer

Personal information
- Nationality: Sweden
- Born: 16 August 1994 (age 32) Vara, Sweden
- Height: 1.75 m (5 ft 9 in)

Career
- Sport: Golf
- Turned professional: 2013
- Current tour: Challenge Tour
- Former tours: European Tour; Nordic Golf League
- Professional wins: 7

Achievements and awards
- PGA of Sweden Future Fund Award: 2019

Per Längfors (born 16 August 1994) is a Swedish professional golfer. He has played on the European Tour and now plays on the Challenge Tour. He was runner-up at the 2024 Blot Open de Bretagne.

== Career ==
Längfors grew up in Tråvad near Vara, Sweden and started playing golf at Vara-Bjertorp Golf Club in 2006. In 2010, he moved to Scania when he was accepted to the golf riksidrottsgymnasium program in Klippan/Ljungbyhed, where he became classmates with Elin Arvidsson and Lynn Carlsson, and coached by Hans Larsson. He turned professional after graduating in 2013.

Längfors joined the Nordic Golf League in 2014. Between 2016 and 2018, he won four titles, one each in Sweden, Denmark, Norway, and Germany.

Längfors secured his European Tour card for 2019 at Q-School. His best finish in his rookie season came at ISPS Handa World Super 6 Perth, where he shot an eight-under-par 64 and was the top seed heading into the final match-play round, ultimately finishing 9th.

In 2024, he joined the Challenge Tour, where he was runner-up at the Blot Open de Bretagne. He tied for 3rd at the 2026 English Open.

== Amateur wins ==
- 2008 Skandia Tour Västergötland #5
- 2011 Skandia Tour Riks #6 Västergötland
- 2013 Onsjö Junior Open

== Professional wins (7) ==
=== Nordic Golf League wins (5) ===
| No. | Date | Tournament | Winning score | Margin of victory | Runner(s)-up |
|---|---|---|---|---|---|
| 1 | 21 May 2016 | Stora Hotellet Bryggan Fjällbacka Open | −17 (67-66-66=199) | 2 strokes | (Denmark) Mark Haastrup, (Sweden) Björn Hellgren |
| 2 | 22 Jun 2017 | Borre Open | −9 (68-70-69=207) | 1 stroke | (Denmark) Daniel Løkke, (Norway) Aksel Olsen, (Sweden) Anton Wejshag |
| 3 | 9 Sep 2017 | Willis Towers Watson Masters | −9 (68-73-66=207) | Playoff | (Norway) Male Arnøy |
| 4 | 10 May 2018 | Master of the Monster | E (73-73-73-73=292) | 1 stroke | (Denmark) Marcus Helligkilde |
| 5 | 26 Jun 2026 | PGA of Sweden Championship | −18 (65-65-68=198) | 1 stroke | (Denmark) Claes Thrane Borregaard |

=== Other wins (2) ===
- 2015 Hjo-S-Open (SGF Golf Ranking)
- 2018 TWS Torreby Open (Future Series)

== Playoff record ==
Challenge Tour playoff record (0–1)

| No. | Year | Tournament | Opponent | Result |
|---|---|---|---|---|
| 1 | 2024 | Blot Open de Bretagne | (England) John Parry | Lost to par on first extra hole |

== Team appearances ==
Professional

- European Championships (representing Sweden): 2018

== See also ==
- 2018 European Tour Qualifying School graduates
