= 2018 China Tour =

Golf tour season

2018 China Tour season
- Duration: 7 March 2018 – 15 December 2018
- Number of official events: 10
- Most wins: (United States) Charlie Saxon (2)
- Order of Merit: (United States) Charlie Saxon

The 2018 China Tour was the fifth season of the China Tour, the main professional golf tour in China since separating from PGA Tour China in 2017.

== OWGR inclusion ==
In December 2017, it was announced that all China Tour events would receive Official World Golf Ranking points at the minimum level of 4 points for the winner of a 54-hole event and 6 points for the winner of a 72-hole event.

== Schedule ==
The following table lists official events during the 2018 season.

Date	Tournament	Location	Purse (CN¥)	Winner (Note: The number in brackets after each winner's name is the number of China Tour events they had won up to and including that tournament.)	OWGR points	Other tours (Note: ASA − Asian Tour; CHA − Challenge Tour.)
10 Mar	Shenzhou Peninsula Classic	Hainan	1,350,000	(United States) Charlie Saxon (3)	6	
1 Apr	Boao Open	Hainan	1,350,000	(United States) Charlie Saxon (4)	6	
15 Apr	Belt & Road Colorful Yunnan Open	Yunnan	US$350,000	(Finland) Kim Koivu (n/a)	9	CHA
22 Apr	Colorful Yunnan Classic	Yunnan	1,350,000	(China) Wu Tuxuan (1)	6	
20 May	Asia-Pacific Classic	Henan	US$300,000	(United States) John Catlin (n/a)	10	ASA
14 Oct	Hainan Open	Hainan	US$350,000	(Finland) Kalle Samooja (n/a)	13	CHA
21 Oct	Foshan Open	Guangdong	US$500,000	(France) Víctor Perez (n/a)	13	CHA
25 Nov	Chongqing Kingrun Open	Chongqing	700,000	(China) Zhang Xinjun (3)	6	
9 Dec	Xiamen Open	Fujian	700,000	(China) Zhuang Zhu (1)	6	
15 Dec	China Great Bay Open	Guangdong	700,000	(Sweden) Andreas Gronkvist (1)	6	

== Order of Merit ==
The Order of Merit was based on prize money won during the season, calculated in Renminbi. The leading player on the Order of Merit earned status to play on the 2019 European Tour.

Position	Player	Prize money (CN¥)	Status earned
1	(United States) Charlie Saxon	597,893	Promoted to European Tour
2	(New Zealand) Luke Toomey	291,600	
3	(China) Wu Tuxuan	280,172	
4	(Canada) Sunil Jung	197,695	
5	(United States) Shotaro Ban	185,321	

== See also ==
- 2018 PGA Tour China
