= Finnish Tour seasons =

Golf tour seasons

This page lists all Finnish Tour seasons from its inaugural season in 2002.

Since its inception, many of the tournaments on the Finnish Tour schedule have been incorporated into the Nordic Golf League, one of the third-tier tours recognised by the European Tour.

== 2026 season ==
=== Schedule ===
The following table lists official events during the 2026 season.

Date	Tournament	Location	Purse (€)	Winner (Note: The number in brackets after each winner's name is the number of Finnish Tour events they had won up to and including that tournament. As most Finnish Tour events are incorporated into the Nordic Golf League schedule, details of these wins are displayed there instead.)	Main tour (Note: NGL − Nordic Golf League.)
17 May	Finnish Tour Opening	Uusimaa	10,000	(Finland) Saku Ellilä (a) (1)	
30 May	Finnish Tour Kytäjä Golf	Uusimaa	10,000	(Finland) Leevi Hellberg (a) (1)	
5 Jun	Finnish Tour Espoo	Uusimaa	10,000	(Finland) Rasmus Karlsson (2)	
18 Jun	SM Reikäpeli	Uusimaa	n/a	(Finland) Oskari Schuvalow (1)	
9 Jul	Hook Open	Pirkanmaa	35,000	(Finland) Kristian Kulokorpi (2)	
18 Jul	SM Lyöntipeli	Central Finland	n/a	(Finland) Lauri Rosendahl (2)	
29 Aug	Finnish Open	Uusimaa	50,000	(Sweden) David Nyfjäll	NGL
~~5 Sep~~	Finnish Tour Vuosaari Golf	Uusimaa	–	Cancelled	
19 Sep	Finnish Tour Final	Kanta-Häme	10,000	(Finland) Arttu Kulmala (1)	

=== Order of Merit ===
The Order of Merit was based on tournament results during the season, calculated using a points-based system.

Position	Player	Points
1	(Finland) Saku Ellilä (a)	625
2	(Finland) Kristian Kulokorpi	498
3	(Finland) Konsta Jutila	437
4	(Finland) Rasmus Lindberg	433
5	(Finland) Roope Kakko	402

== 2025 season ==
=== Schedule ===
The following table lists official events during the 2025 season.

Date	Tournament	Location	Purse (€)	Winner	Main tour
17 May	Finnish Tour Opening	Uusimaa	10,000	(Finland) Alex Hietala (3)	
13 Jun	Finnish Tour Golf Talma	Uusimaa	10,000	(Finland) Oskari Nikku (2)	
19 Jun	SM Reikäpeli	Pirkanmaa	n/a	(Finland) Otto Vanhatalo (1)	
10 Jul	Hook Open	Pirkanmaa	35,000	(Finland) Ilari Saulo (3)	
26 Jul	SM Lyöntipeli	North Karelia	n/a	(Finland) Lauri Rosendahl (1)	
23 Aug	Finnish Open	Uusimaa	50,000	(Denmark) Jacob Worm Agerschou	NGL
29 Aug	Footjoy Finnish Swing	Southwest Finland	50,000	(Denmark) Jacob Worm Agerschou	NGL
5 Sep	Finnish Tour Vuosaari Golf	Uusimaa	10,000	(Finland) Matias Rantala (1)	
13 Sep	Finnish Tour Final	Kanta-Häme	10,000	(Finland) Sami Santala (1)	

=== Order of Merit ===
The Order of Merit was based on tournament results during the season, calculated using a points-based system.

Position	Player	Points
1	(Finland) Oskari Nikku	475
2	(Finland) Saku Halonen	457
3	(Finland) Joachim Altonen	428
4	(Finland) Sami Santala	425
5	(Denmark) Jacob Worm Agerschou	400

== 2024 season ==
=== Schedule ===
The following table lists official events during the 2024 season.

Date	Tournament	Location	Purse (€)	Winner	Main tour
18 May	Finnish Tour Opening	Uusimaa	10,000	(Finland) Alex Hietala (2)	
1 Jun	Finnish Tour 2	Uusimaa	10,000	(Finland) Tuomas Salminen (2)	
9 Jun	Infra Kiri Open	Pirkanmaa	10,000	(Finland) Sakke Siltala (a) (1)	
14 Jun	Paltamo Open	Kainuu	10,000	(Finland) Joachim Altonen (2)	
20 Jun	SM Reikäpeli	Kanta-Häme	n/a	(Finland) Sami Välimäki (2)	
11 Jul	Hook Open	Pirkanmaa	40,000	(Finland) Juuso Kahlos (3)	
24 Aug	Timberwise Finnish Open	Southwest Finland	50,000	(Denmark) Victor Sidal Svendsen	NGL
30 Aug	Footjoy Finnish Swing	Southwest Finland	50,000	(Denmark) Anders Emil Ejlersen	NGL
14 Sep	Finnish Tour Final	Uusimaa	10,000	(Finland) Roope Kakko (4)	

=== Order of Merit ===
The Order of Merit was based on tournament results during the season, calculated using a points-based system.

Position	Player	Points
1	(Finland) Roope Kakko	490
2	(Finland) Kristian Kulokorpi	426
3	(Finland) Saku Ellilä (a)	410
4	(Finland) Joachim Altonen	402
5	(Finland) Niclas Hellberg	399

== 2023 season ==
=== Schedule ===
The following table lists official events during the 2023 season.

Date	Tournament	Location	Purse (€)	Winner	Main tour
27 May	WestStar Open	Uusimaa	10,000	(Finland) Rasmus Karlsson (1)	
3 Jun	Seiko Open	Uusimaa	10,000	(Finland) Jonatan Jolkkonen (2)	
17 Jun	SM Reikäpeli	Central Finland	n/a	(Finland) Oskari Nikku (1)	
8 Jul	EEZY Open	Pirkanmaa	40,000	(Finland) Lauri Ruuska (6)	
22 Jul	SM Lyöntipeli	Kymenlaakso	n/a	(Finland) Jaapo Jämsä (2)	
4 Aug	Paltamo Open	Kainuu	10,000	(Finland) Joachim Altonen (1)	
27 Aug	Timberwise Finnish Open	Lapland	50,000	(Finland) Rasmus Karlsson	NGL
1 Sep	Nordcenter Fream Extreme	Uusimaa	50,000	(Norway) Jarand Ekeland Arnøy	NGL
17 Sep	Telia Samsung Open	Uusimaa	10,000	(Finland) Nikke Tyry (1)	

=== Order of Merit ===
The Order of Merit was based on tournament results during the season, calculated using a points-based system.

Position	Player	Points
1	(Finland) Rasmus Karlsson	647
2	(Finland) Kristian Kulokorpi	478
3	(Finland) Jonatan Jolkkonen	398
4	(Finland) Niclas Hellberg	362
5	(Finland) Nikke Tyry	292

== 2022 season ==
=== Schedule ===
The following table lists official events during the 2022 season.

Date	Tournament	Location	Purse (€)	Winner (Note: The number in brackets after each winner's name is the number of Finnish Tour events they had won up to and including that tournament.)
15 May	Telia Samsung Open	Uusimaa	10,000	(Finland) Alex Hietala (1)
29 May	Kuljetusrinki Open	Uusimaa	10,000	(Finland) Lauri Ruuska (5)
4 Jun	EEZY Open	Pirkanmaa	40,000	(Finland) Ilari Saulo (2)
11 Jun	Westerback 1897 Open	Uusimaa	10,000	(Finland) Peter Puhakka (2)
18 Jun	PGA Finland Championship	Uusimaa	15,000	(Finland) Niclas Hellberg (5)
9 Jul	CapMan Wealth Services Open	Uusimaa	10,000	(Finland) Jaapo Jämsä (a) (1)
30 Jul	Finnish Tour 6	Uusimaa	10,000	(Finland) Kim Koivu (4)
11 Sep	WestStar Open	Uusimaa	10,000	(Finland) Niilo Mäki-Petäjä (a) (1)

=== Order of Merit ===
The Order of Merit was based on tournament results during the season, calculated using a points-based system.

Position	Player	Points
1	(Finland) Jaapo Jämsä (a)	409
2	(Finland) Rasmus Karlsson	399
3	(Finland) Teemu Bakker	394
4	(Finland) Ilari Saulo	390
5	(Finland) Henri Satama	344

== 2021 season ==
=== Schedule ===
The following table lists official events during the 2021 season.

Date	Tournament	Location	Purse (€)	Winner
16 May	Finnish Tour Opening	Uusimaa	10,000	(Finland) Roope Kakko (3)
30 May	Finnish Tour II	Uusimaa	10,000	(Finland) Tuomas Nukari (a) (1)
13 Jun	Finnish Tour III	Uusimaa	10,000	(Finland) Aada Rissanen (a) (1)
24 Jun	SM Reikäpeli	Central Finland	4,000	(Finland) Juhana Kukkonen (2)
10 Jul	EEZY Open	Pirkanmaa	40,000	(Finland) Janen Kaske (1)
20 Aug	Paltamo Open	Kainuu	10,000	(Finland) Niclas Hellberg (4)
12 Sep	Audi PGA Finland Championship	Uusimaa	10,000	(Finland) Henri Satama (2)

=== Order of Merit ===
The Order of Merit was based on tournament results during the season, calculated using a points-based system.

Position	Player	Points
1	(Finland) Casper Simberg	472
2	(Finland) Niclas Hellberg	461
3	(Finland) Tuomas Salminen	459
4	(Finland) Henri Satama	433
5	(Finland) Juhana Kukkonen	370

== 2020 season ==
=== Schedule ===
The following table lists official events during the 2020 season.

Date	Tournament	Location	Purse (€)	Winner
7 Jun	Finnish Tour I	Uusimaa	15,000	(Finland) Roope Kakko (2)
12 Jun	Paltamo Open	Kainuu	10,000	(Finland) Elias Haavisto (a) (1)
3 Jul	SM Reikäpeli	Pirkanmaa	4,000	(Finland) Ilari Saulo (a) (1)
2 Aug	Finnish Tour IV	Uusimaa	10,000	(Finland) Oliver Lindell (1)
22 Aug	Audi PGA Finland Championship	Uusimaa	10,000	(Finland) Matias Honkala (3)
13 Sep	Finnish Tour Final	Uusimaa	10,000	(Finland) Matias Honkala (4)

=== Order of Merit ===
The Order of Merit was based on tournament results during the season, calculated using a points-based system.

Position	Player	Points
1	(Finland) Matias Honkala	676
2	(Finland) Alex Hietala	540
3	(Finland) Ilari Saulo	472
4	(Finland) Elias Haavisto	357
5	(Finland) Jesse Waaralinna	349

== 2019 season ==
=== Schedule ===
The following table lists official events during the 2019 season.

Date	Tournament	Location	Purse (€)	Winner
5 May	Finnish Tour Opening	Uusimaa	10,000	(Finland) Lauri Ruuska (4)
17 May	Finnish Tour II	Uusimaa	10,000	(Finland) Atte Länsiluoto (a) (1)
2 Jun	Finnish Tour III	Uusimaa	10,000	(Finland) Mikael Salminen (5)
15 Jun	NRG Open	Pirkanmaa	50,000	(Finland) Sami Välimäki (1)
28 Jun	Audi PGA Finland Championship	Uusimaa	10,000	(Finland) Joonas Granberg (7)
5 Jul	SM Reikäpeli	Päijät-Häme	4,000	(Finland) Toffe Jusslin (1)
25 Aug	Finnish Tour IV	Uusimaa	10,000	(Finland) Jonatan Jolkkonen (a) (1)
15 Sep	Vierumäki Tour Final	Päijät-Häme	10,000	(Finland) Eemil Alajärvi (a) (1)

=== Order of Merit ===
The Order of Merit was based on tournament results during the season, calculated using a points-based system.

Position	Player	Points
1	(Finland) Sami Välimäki	420
2	(Finland) Mikael Salminen	412
3	(Finland) Peter Erofejeff	365
4	(Finland) Eemil Alajärvi (a)	338
5	(Finland) Ossi Mikkola	328

== 2018 season ==
=== Schedule ===
The following table lists official events during the 2018 season.

Date	Tournament	Location	Purse (€)	Winner
5 May	Finnish Tour Opening	Uusimaa	10,000	(Finland) Matias Honkala (a) (2)
18 May	Finnish Tour II	Uusimaa	10,000	(Finland) Mikael Salminen (4)
1 Jun	Paltamo Open	Kainuu	10,000	(Finland) Jaakko Mäkitalo (2)
9 Jun	Finnish Tour IV	Uusimaa	10,000	(Finland) Niclas Hellberg (3)
16 Jun	NRG Open	Pirkanmaa	30,000	(Finland) Kim Koivu (3)
28 Jun	Audi PGA Finland Championship	Uusimaa	10,000	(Finland) Jaakko Mäkitalo (3)
6 Jul	SM Reikäpeli	Uusimaa	4,000	(Finland) Albert Eckhardt (2)
15 Sep	Vierumäki Tour Final	Päijät-Häme	10,000	(Finland) Roope Kakko (1)

=== Order of Merit ===
The Order of Merit was based on tournament results during the season, calculated using a points-based system.

Position	Player	Points
1	(Finland) Jaakko Mäkitalo	500
2	(Finland) Mikael Salminen	443
3	(Finland) Ossi Mikkola	407
4	(Finland) Juhana Kukkonen	388
5	(Finland) Veeti Mähönen	344

== 2017 season ==
=== Schedule ===
The following table lists official events during the 2017 season.

Date	Tournament	Location	Purse (€)	Winner
6 May	Finnish Tour Opening	Uusimaa	10,000	(Finland) Lauri Ruuska (2)
21 May	Finnish Tour 2	North Ostrobothnia	10,000	(Finland) Peter Erofejeff (8)
10 Jun	Finnish Tour 3	Uusimaa	10,000	(Finland) Lauri Ruuska (3)
18 Jun	Paltamo Open	Kainuu	15,000	(Finland) Niclas Hellberg (2)
6 Jul	SM Reikäpeli	Uusimaa	4,000	(Finland) Mikael Salminen (3)
9 Sep	Finnish Tour 6	Uusimaa	10,000	(Finland) Juhana Kukkonen (1)
16 Sep	Finnish Tour Final	Uusimaa	10,000	(Finland) Ursula Wikström (n/a)

=== Order of Merit ===
The Order of Merit was based on tournament results during the season, calculated using a points-based system.

Position	Player	Points
1	(Finland) Mikael Salminen	861
2	(Finland) Lauri Ruuska	781
3	(Finland) Peter Erofejeff	685
4	(Finland) Aleksi Myllymäki	423
5	(Finland) Niclas Hellberg	418

== 2016 season ==
=== Schedule ===
The following table lists official events during the 2016 season.

Date	Tournament	Location	Purse (€)	Winner
8 May	Audi Finnish Tour Opening	Uusimaa	10,000	(Finland) Kim Koivu (a) (2)
24 May	Audi Finnish Tour 2	Kanta-Häme	10,000	(Finland) Matias Honkala (a) (1)
12 Jun	Audi Finnish Tour 3	Kainuu	15,000	(Finland) Peter Erofejeff (7)
18 Jun	Audi Finnish Tour 4	Uusimaa	10,000	(Finland) Kalle Samooja (7)
8 Jul	SM Reikäpeli	Uusimaa	4,000	(Finland) Peter Puhakka (1)
10 Sep	Audi Finnish Tour 6	Uusimaa	10,000	(Finland) Mikael Salminen (2)
17 Sep	Audi Finnish Tour Final	Uusimaa	10,000	(Finland) Kalle Samooja (8)

=== Order of Merit ===
The Order of Merit was based on tournament results during the season, calculated using a points-based system.

Position	Player	Points
1	(Finland) Tuomas Salminen	553
2	(Finland) Kim Koivu	480
3	(Finland) Peter Erofejeff	466
4	(Finland) Peter Puhakka	433
5	(Finland) Joonas Granberg	408

== 2015 season ==
=== Schedule ===
The following table lists official events during the 2015 season.

Date	Tournament	Location	Purse (€)	Winner	Main tour
26 May	Audi Finnish Tour 1	Kanta-Häme	10,000	(Finland) Linus Väisänen (a) (1)	
6 Jun	Audi Finnish Tour 2	Uusimaa	10,000	(Finland) Kim Koivu (a) (1)	
13 Jun	Audi Finnish Tour 3	Uusimaa	10,000	(Finland) Peter Erofejeff (6)	
2 Jul	Audi Finnish Tour 4	North Savo	8,000	(Finland) Juuso Kahlos (a) (2)	
12 Jul	Finnish Open	Uusimaa	50,000	(Finland) Tapio Pulkkanen	NGL
25 Jul	Master Promo Championship	Southwest Finland	40,000	(Finland) Oliver Lindell (a)	NGL
6 Sep	Paltamo Open	Kainuu	20,000	(Finland) Tuomas Salminen (1)	
12 Sep	Audi Finnish Tour Final	Uusimaa	10,000	(Finland) Mikael Salminen (1)	

=== Order of Merit ===
The Order of Merit was based on tournament results during the season, calculated using a points-based system.

Position	Player	Points
1	(Finland) Tuomas Salminen	512
2	(Finland) Mikael Salminen	469
3	(Finland) Peter Erofejeff	356
4	(Finland) Peter Puhakka	355
5	(Finland) Kim Koivu	325

== 2014 season ==
=== Schedule ===
The following table lists official events during the 2014 season.

Date	Tournament	Location	Purse (€)	Winner
27 May	Audi Finnish Tour Opening	Kanta-Häme	10,000	(Finland) Miki Kuronen (a) (1)
7 Jun	Audi Finnish Tour Nordcenter	Uusimaa	10,000	(Finland) Joonas Granberg (6)
14 Jun	Audi Finnish Tour Peuramaa	Uusimaa	10,000	(Finland) Janne Mommo (1)
3 Jul	SM Reikäpeli	Southwest Finland	8,000	(Finland) Tuomas Tuovinen (1)
22 Aug	Audi PGA Finland Championship	Kanta-Häme	10,000	(Finland) Peter Erofejeff (5)
30 Aug	Paltamo Open	Kainuu	20,000	(Finland) Jani Christoffer Perttilä (1)
6 Sep	K-Supermarket Kamppi Open	Uusimaa	10,000	(Finland) Henri Satama (2)
13 Sep	Audi Finnish Tour Final	Uusimaa	10,000	(Finland) Matti Meriläinen (1)

=== Order of Merit ===
The Order of Merit was based on tournament results during the season, calculated using a points-based system.

Position	Player	Points
1	(Finland) Henri Satama	610
2	(Finland) Jani Christoffer Perttilä	503
3	(Finland) Janne Kaske	493
4	(Finland) Henri Lipsanen	414
5	(Finland) Niklas Dahlgren	393

== 2013 season ==
=== Schedule ===
The following table lists official events during the 2013 season.

Date	Tournament	Location	Purse (€)	Winner
31 May	Finnish Tour St. Laurence	Uusimaa	15,000	(Finland) Kalle Samooja (6)
8 Jun	Finnish Tour Peuramaa Golf	Uusimaa	15,000	(Finland) Juuso Kahlos (a) (1)
15 Jun	Finnish Tour Paltamo	Kainuu	15,000	(Finland) Antti Ahokas (2)
28 Jun	Audi PGA Finland Championship	Kanta-Häme	15,000	(Finland) Joonas Granberg (5)
22 Aug	SM Reikäpeli	Kymenlaakso	15,000	(Finland) Lauri Ruuska (1)
7 Sep	K-Supermarket Kamppi Open	Uusimaa	15,000	(Finland) Jaakko Mäkitalo (1)
15 Sep	FT Final	Uusimaa	15,000	(Finland) Kristian Kulokorpi (a) (1)

=== Order of Merit ===
The Order of Merit was based on tournament results during the season, calculated using a points-based system.

Position	Player	Points
1	(Finland) Lauri Ruuska	551
2	(Finland) Juuso Kahlos	468
3	(Finland) Antti Ahokas	396
4	(Finland) Mikael Salminen	356
5	(Finland) Vasuri Mäkitalo	354

== 2012 season ==
=== Schedule ===
The following table lists official events during the 2012 season.

Date	Tournament	Location	Purse (€)	Winner	Main tour
2 Jun	Finnish Tour Opening	Uusimaa	15,000	(Finland) Tuomas Pollari (1)	
9 Jun	Finnish Tour St. Laurence	Uusimaa	15,000	(Finland) Kalle Samooja (5)	
16 Jun	Paltamo Open	Kainuu	15,000	(Finland) Peter Erofejeff (3)	
14 Jul	TehoSport Finnish Open	Uusimaa	60,000	(Finland) Tapio Pulkkanen (a)	NGL
23 Aug	SM Reikäpeli	Uusimaa	15,000	(Finland) Teemu Toivonen (1)	
1 Sep	Meri Teijo Open	Southwest Finland	25,000	(Finland) Miki Kuronen (a)	NGL
9 Sep	Finnish Tour Pickala Golf	Uusimaa	15,000	(Finland) Niklas Dahlgren (1)	
16 Sep	FT Final	Uusimaa	15,000	(Finland) Peter Erofejeff (4)	

=== Order of Merit ===
The Order of Merit was based on tournament results during the season, calculated using a points-based system.

Position	Player	Points
1	(Finland) Kalle Samooja	506
2	(Finland) Peter Erofejeff	500
3	(Finland) Teemu Toivonen	419
4	(Finland) Niklas Dahlgren	411
5	(Finland) Erik Myllymäki	383

== 2011 season ==
=== Schedule ===
The following table lists official events during the 2011 season.

Date	Tournament	Location	Purse (€)	Winner	Main tour
4 Jun	Finnish Tour Opening	Uusimaa	15,000	(Finland) Kalle Samooja (3)	
11 Jun	Finnish Tour St. Laurence	Uusimaa	15,000	(Finland) Kalle Samooja (4)	
19 Jun	Finnish Tour Kytäjä Golf	Uusimaa	15,000	(Finland) Albert Eckhardt (a) (1)	
2 Jul	Finnish Tour Pickala Golf	Uusimaa	15,000	(Finland) Joonas Granberg (3)	
16 Jul	Finnish Open	Uusimaa	60,000	(Denmark) Morten Ørum Madsen	NGL
26 Aug	SM Reikäpeli	South Karelia	15,000	(Finland) Ville Lagerblom (1)	
3 Sep	Paltamo Open	Kainuu	15,000	(Finland) Pasi Purhonen (1)	
10 Sep	Finnish Tour Vuosaari Golf	Uusimaa	15,000	(Finland) Joonas Granberg (4)	
16 Sep	Mandatum Life Final	Uusimaa	15,000	(Finland) Peter Erofejeff (2)	

=== Order of Merit ===
The Order of Merit was based on tournament results during the season, calculated using a points-based system.

Position	Player	Points
1	(Finland) Joonas Granberg	848
2	(Finland) Pasi Purhonen	635
3	(Finland) Kalle Samooja	580
4	(Finland) Toni Karjalainen	569
5	(Finland) Janne Martikainen	462

== 2010 season ==
=== Schedule ===
The following table lists official events during the 2010 season.

Date	Tournament	Location	Purse (€)	Winner	Main tour
30 May	FGT Opening	Southwest Finland	15,000	(Finland) Joonas Granberg	NGL
19 Jun	Finnish Tour 2	Uusimaa	15,000	(Finland) Tuomas Tuovinen	NGL
3 Jul	Finnish Tour 3	Uusimaa	15,000	(Finland) Jani Christoffer Perttilä	NGL
27 Aug	SM Reikäpeli	Southwest Finland	15,000	(Finland) Niclas Hellberg (1)	
3 Sep	Peltomäki Golf Open	Uusimaa	15,000	(Finland) Jani Christoffer Perttilä	NGL
11 Sep	Finnish Tour 6	Uusimaa	15,000	(Finland) Tapio Pulkannen (a)	NGL
19 Sep	Finnish Tour Final	Uusimaa	15,000	(Finland) Thomas Sundström	NGL

=== Order of Merit ===
The Order of Merit was based on tournament results during the season, calculated using a points-based system.

Position	Player	Points
1	(Finland) Joonas Granberg	546
2	(Finland) Jani Christoffer Perttilä	497
3	(Finland) Toni Karjalainen	403
4	(Finland) Thomas Sundström	379
5	(Finland) Janne Mommo	353

== 2009 season ==
=== Schedule ===
The following table lists official events during the 2009 season.

Date	Tournament	Location	Purse (€)	Winner	Main tour
30 May	FGT Opening	Southwest Finland	15,000	(Finland) Thomas Sundström	NGL
12 Jun	FGT II	South Ostrobothnia	15,000	(Finland) Toni Karjalainen	NGL
26 Jun	SM Reikäpeli	Päijät-Häme	15,000	(Finland) Jonas Haglund (1)	
4 Jul	FGT III	Uusimaa	15,000	(Finland) Tuomas Pollari	NGL
30 Aug	FGT IV	Uusimaa	15,000	(Finland) Tapio Pulkkanen (a)	NGL
13 Sep	FGT V	Uusimaa	15,000	(Finland) Erik Stenman	NGL
19 Sep	FGT Final	North Savo	20,000	(Finland) Thomas Sundström	NGL

=== Order of Merit ===
The Order of Merit was based on tournament results during the season, calculated using a points-based system.

Position	Player	Points
1	(Finland) Thomas Sundström	724
2	(Finland) Tapio Pulkkanen (a)	465
3	(Finland) Toni Karjalainen	406
4	(Finland) Tuomas Pollari	405
5	(Finland) Peter Erofejeff	359

== 2008 season ==
=== Schedule ===
The following table lists official events during the 2008 season.

Date	Tournament	Location	Purse (€)	Winner	Main tour
31 May	FGT Opening	Southwest Finland	15,000	(Finland) Joachim Altonen	NGL
27 Jun	SM Reikäpeli	Uusimaa	15,000	(Finland) Henri Satama (1)	
13 Jul	FGT 3	Uusimaa	15,000	(Finland) Tuomas Pollari	NGL
27 Jul	Hansabanka Baltic Open	Latvia	50,000	(Sweden) Per Barth	NGL
10 Aug	Kivitippu Pro-Am	South Ostrobothnia	30,000	(Finland) Janne Mommo	NGL
17 Aug	FGT 4	Uusimaa	15,000	(Finland) Ossi Mikkola	NGL
30 Aug	Gant Open	Southwest Finland	SKr 300,000	(Sweden) Jens Dantorp	NGL
21 Sep	FGT Final	Estonia	15,000	(Finland) Kalle Samooja (a)	NGL

=== Order of Merit ===
The Order of Merit was based on tournament results during the season, calculated using a points-based system.

Position	Player	Points
1	(Finland) Kalle Samooja (a)	349
2	(Finland) Henri Satama	319
3	(Finland) Ossi Mikkola	270
4	(Finland) Joachim Altonen	249
5	(Finland) Pasi Purhonen	240

== 2007 season ==
=== Schedule ===
The following table lists official events during the 2007 season.

Date	Tournament	Location	Purse (€)	Winner	Main tour
3 Jun	FGT Opening	Southwest Finland	15,000	(Finland) Janne Mommo	NGL
17 Jun	FGT II	Uusimaa	15,000	(Finland) Joonas Granberg (a) (2)	
15 Jul	Sunny Trading Finnish Open	Kanta-Häme	25,000	(Finland) Thomas Sundström	NGL
29 Jul	SM Reikäpeli	North Ostrobothnia	15,000	(Finland) Kalle Samooja (a) (2)	
19 Aug	St Laurence Open	Uusimaa	15,000	(Finland) Joonas Granberg (a)	NGL
8 Sep	Gant Open	Southwest Finland	15,000	(Finland) Peter Erofejeff (1)	
23 Sep	EGCC Open	Estonia	25,000	(Sweden) Joakim Rask	NGL

=== Order of Merit ===
The Order of Merit was based on tournament results during the season, calculated using a points-based system.

Position	Player	Points
1	(Finland) Joonas Granberg	520
2	(Finland) Thomas Sundström	379
3	(Finland) Markus Ervasti	371
4	(Finland) Matti Meriläinen	329
5	(Finland) Janne Kaske	315

== 2006 season ==
=== Schedule ===
The following table lists official events during the 2006 season.

Date	Tournament	Location	Purse (€)	Winner	Main tour
27 May	FGT Opening	Southwest Finland	12,000	(Finland) Tuomas Tuovinen	NGL
11 Jun	Sonera Open	Uusimaa	15,000	(Finland) Mika Lehtinen	NGL
9 Jul	Finnish Open	Uusimaa	15,000	(Finland) Jaakko Mäkitalo	NGL
13 Aug	SM Reikäpeli	Southwest Finland	15,000	(Finland) Kalle Samooja (a) (1)	
27 Aug	Hansabank Estonian Open	Estonia	25,000	(Finland) Casimir Collin	NGL
9 Sep	Gant Open	Southwest Finland	15,000	(Finland) Antti Ahokas	NGL

=== Order of Merit ===
The Order of Merit was based on tournament results during the season, calculated using a points-based system.

Position	Player	Points
1	(Finland) Casimir Collin	386
2	(Finland) Kalle Samooja (a)	358
3	(Finland) Tuomas Tuovinen	320
4	(Finland) Mika Lehtinen	296
5	(Finland) Jaakko Mäkitalo	290

== 2005 season ==
=== Schedule ===
The following table lists official events during the 2005 season.

Date	Tournament	Location	Purse (€)	Winner	Main tour
29 May	Finnish Golf Tour Opening	Southwest Finland	12,000	(Finland) Panu Kylliäinen	NGL
12 Jun	Sonera Open	Uusimaa	15,000	(Finland) Antti Ahokas (a)	NGL
10 Jul	FGT 3	Uusimaa	12,000	(Finland) Eero Kangasniemi	NGL
14 Aug	SM Reikäpeli	Uusimaa	12,000	(Finland) Joonas Granberg (a) (1)	
4 Sep	Holiday Club Open	Kainuu	12,000	(Finland) Ari Savolainen	NGL
11 Sep	Gant Open	Southwest Finland	15,000	(Finland) Ari Savolainen	NGL

=== Order of Merit ===
The Order of Merit was based on tournament results during the season, calculated using a points-based system.

Position	Player	Points
1	(Finland) Ari Savolainen	500
2	(Finland) Janne Mommo	411
3	(Finland) Joonas Granberg (a)	392
4	(Finland) Peter Erofejeff	331
5	(Finland) Antti Ulvio (a)	264

== 2004 season ==
=== Schedule ===
The following table lists official events during the 2004 season.

Date	Tournament	Location	Purse (€)	Winner	Main tour
6 Jun	Finnish Golf Tour Opening	Southwest Finland	10,000	(Finland) Erik Stenman (a)	NGL
20 Jun	Sonera Open	Uusimaa	10,000	(Finland) Roope Kakko (a)	NGL
11 Jul	Gant Open	Southwest Finland	10,000	(Finland) Jaakko Mäkitalo	NGL
15 Aug	SM Reikäpeli	Uusimaa	10,000	(Finland) Antti Ahokas (a) (1)	
29 Jul	Kaupthing Bank Open	Uusimaa	10,000	(Finland) Jaakko Mäkitalo	NGL
12 Sep	Holiday Club Open	Kainuu	10,000	(Finland) Matti Meriläinen (a)	NGL

=== Order of Merit ===
The Order of Merit was based on tournament results during the season, calculated using a points-based system.

Position	Player	Points
1	(Finland) Jaakko Mäkitalo	496
2	(Finland) Heikki Mäntylä (a)	380
3	(Finland) Erik Stenman (a)	342
4	(Finland) Matti Meriläinen (a)	268
5	(Finland) Harri Murtonen	246

== 2003 season ==
=== Schedule ===
The following table lists official events during the 2003 season.

Date	Tournament	Location	Purse (€)	Winner	Main tour
25 May	Finnish Golf Tour Opening	Southwest Finland	9,000	(Finland) Jarkko Soikkeli	NGL
15 Jun	Affecto Open	Uusimaa	9,000	(Finland) Keijo Jaakola (a)	NGL
29 Jun	Starkki Challenge	Päijät-Häme	9,000	(Finland) Jarkko Soikkeli	NGL
27 Jul	Rannila SM Reikäpeli	Uusimaa	9,000	(Finland) Ville Karhu (1)	
17 Aug	Sony Cybershot Open	Kymenlaakso	9,000	(Finland) Juha-Pekka Peltomäki	NGL
7 Sep	Holiday Club Open	Kainuu	9,000	(Finland) Janne Martikainen	NGL

=== Order of Merit ===
The Order of Merit was based on tournament results during the season, calculated using a points-based system.

Position	Player	Points
1	(Finland) Jarkko Soikkeli	530
2	(Finland) Toni Karjalainen	371
3	(Finland) Keijo Jaakola (a)	353
4	(Finland) Juha-Pekka Peltomäki	339
5	(Finland) Janne Martikainen	305

== 2002 season ==
=== Schedule ===
The following table lists official events during the 2002 season.

Date	Tournament	Location	Purse (€)	Winner	Main tour
26 May	Intersport Open	Southwest Finland	8,000	(Finland) Mikael Piltz	NGL
16 Jun	Affecto Open	Uusimaa	8,000	(Finland) Kalle Aitala	NGL
30 Jun	Messilä Trophy	Päijät-Häme	8,000	(Finland) Toni Karjalainen	NGL
28 Jul	SM Reikäpeli	Uusimaa	8,000	(Finland) Toni Karjalainen (1)	
18 Aug	Kotka Golf Center Open	Kymenlaakso	8,000	(Finland) Panu Kylliäinen	NGL
8 Sep	Holiday Club Open	Kainuu	8,000	(Sweden) Peter Gustafsson	NGL

=== Order of Merit ===
The Order of Merit was based on tournament results during the season, calculated using a points-based system.

Position	Player	Points
1	(Finland) Toni Karjalainen	854
2	(Finland) Janne Mommo	670
3	(Finland) Panu Kylliäinen	559
4	(Finland) Mikael Piltz	537
5	(Finland) Erik Stenman	520
