= Toni Karjalainen =

Finnish professional golfer

Personal information
- Nationality: Finland
- Born: 9 July 1979 (age 47) Lappeenranta, Finland
- Height: 1.88 m (6 ft 2 in)

Career
- Sport: Golf
- Turned professional: 2003
- Former tours: European Tour; Asian Tour; Challenge Tour; Nordic Golf League
- Professional wins: 6

Number of wins by tour
- Challenge Tour: 2
- Other: 4

Achievements and awards
- Finnish Tour Order of Merit winner: 2002

Toni Karjalainen (born 9 July 1979) is a Finnish professional golfer who formerly played on the European Tour and the Challenge Tour. He was his country's highest ranked male golfer and one of only a few Finnish golfers playing on the leading professional tours when he won twice on the Challenge Tour in 2005 and 2006.

== Amateur career ==
As an amateur, Karjalainen represented his country at the European Youths' Team Championship, the European Amateur Team Championship and twice at the Eisenhower Trophy. At the 2001 European Amateur Team Championship at Ljunghusen Golf Club in Sweden, team Finland finished a historical high forth (behind England, Ireland and Sweden) in the qualifying stroke-play competition and lost to champions to be Scotland in the quarter-finals.

In June 2002, still an amateur, Karjalainen won the Messilä Trophy in Finland on the Nordic Golf League.

== Professional career ==
Karjalainen earned his playing rights on the 2004 Nordic Golf League by finished second at the qualifying school at Eslöv Golf Club in Sweden at the end of 2003.

Karjalainen won the 2005 Thomas Bjørn Open in Denmark in his first season on the Challenge Tour, the European Tour's official developmental tour, on his way to finish 20th on the Order of Merit, the last place to earn full membership, with limited privileges, on the European Tour for 2006. He followed that up in 2006 by winning again on the Challenge Tour, the Telenet Trophy at the Limburg Golf and Country Club in Belgium in a last round interrupted by thunderstorms. He also made several appearances on the main European Tour in 2006, making five cuts. His best finish on the European Tour was tied 20th at the 2006 BA-CA Golf Open in Vienna, Austria.

In July 2006 he reached a career best 282nd on the Official World Golf Ranking, and was at the time Finland's highest ranked player.

Having lost his playing privileges in Europe at the end of the 2008 season, Karjalainen joined the Asian Tour in 2009 after coming through qualifying school.

== Professional wins (6) ==
=== Challenge Tour wins (2) ===
| No. | Date | Tournament | Winning score | Margin of victory | Runner(s)-up |
|---|---|---|---|---|---|
| 1 | 12 Jun 2005 | Thomas Bjørn Open | +4 (66-73-74-75=288) | 1 stroke | (Sweden) Oskar Bergman |
| 2 | 21 May 2006 | Telenet Trophy | −14 (66-73-67-68=274) | 1 stroke | (Spain) Ivó Giner, (England) Gary Lockerbie |

=== Nordic Golf League wins (3) ===
| No. | Date | Tournament | Winning score | Margin of victory | Runner(s)-up |
|---|---|---|---|---|---|
| 1 | 30 Jun 2002 | Messilä Trophy | −15 (63-67-71=201) | 6 strokes | (Finland) Erik Stenman |
| 2 | 12 Jun 2009 | FGT II | −12 (66-68-70=204) | 5 strokes | (Finland) Joonas Granberg, (Finland) Thomas Sundström |
| 3 | 31 Jul 2011 | Gant Open | −16 (65-66-69=200) | Playoff | (Sweden) Kristoffer Broberg |

=== Finnish Tour wins (1) ===
| No. | Date | Tournament | Winning score | Margin of victory | Runner-up |
|---|---|---|---|---|---|
| 1 | 28 Jul 2002 | SM Reikäpeli | 1 up | | (Finland) Mikael Piltz |

== Team appearances ==
Amateur

- European Youths' Team Championship (representing Finland): 1998, 2000
- Eisenhower Trophy (representing Finland): 2000, 2002
- European Amateur Team Championship (representing Finland): 2001

== See also ==
- 2005 Challenge Tour graduates
