= List of golfers to achieve a three-win promotion from the Challenge Tour =

This is a list of golfers who have won three times in a Challenge Tour season since a policy was enacted to promote such players immediately to the European Tour.

No.	Year	Player	Date of third win	Number of events	Results on European Tour after promotion			
No.	Year	Player	Date of third win	Number of events	Events played	Best finish	Earnings (€)	Rank
1	2008	(Netherlands) Taco Remkes	18 Oct	24	0	n/a		
2	2009	(Italy) Edoardo Molinari	25 Oct	18	0	n/a	59,595*	200
3	2011	(France) Benjamin Hébert	27 Aug	13	6	T6	57,229*	195
4	2011	(England) Sam Little	16 Oct	17	2	T15	34,320*	217
5	2012	(Sweden) Kristoffer Broberg	25 Aug	5	5	T27	35,803*	201
6	2013	(United States) Brooks Koepka	23 Jun	10	9	T7	217,762*	113
7	2014	(Germany) Moritz Lampert	3 Aug	9	6	T45	7,500	251
8	2014	(France) Benjamin Hébert (2)	8 Nov	20	0	n/a		
9	2015	(Spain) Nacho Elvira	22 Aug	13	5	Cut	27,170*	214
10	2016	(Germany) Bernd Ritthammer	5 Nov	20	0	n/a	36,753*	201
11	2017	(England) Aaron Rai	23 Jul	9	7	T8	194,271*	142
12	2018	(Finland) Kim Koivu	25 Aug	13	5	T7	57,104*	201
13	2024	(Denmark) Rasmus Neergaard-Petersen	8 Sep	18	6	T4	364,017*	105
14	2024	(England) John Parry	22 Sep	22	3	T20	132,441*	161
15	2025	(South Africa) J. C. Ritchie	21 Sep	16				
16	2025	(Italy) Renato Paratore	12 Oct	23				

*Includes earnings from one or more European Tour events played before promotion.

== See also ==
- List of golfers with most Challenge Tour wins
