= Kalle Samooja =

Finnish professional golfer

Personal information
- Nationality: Finland
- Born: 25 January 1988 (age 38) Turku, Finland
- Height: 180 cm (5 ft 11 in)

Career
- Sport: Golf
- Turned professional: 2010
- Current tour: Asian Tour
- Former tours: European Tour; Challenge Tour; Nordic Golf League; Finnish Tour; LIV Golf
- Professional wins: 12

Number of wins by tour
- European Tour: 1
- Challenge Tour: 1
- Other: 10

Best results in major championships
- Masters Tournament: DNP
- PGA Championship: CUT: 2021
- U.S. Open: CUT: 2022
- The Open Championship: CUT: 2023

Achievements and awards
- Finnish Tour Order of Merit winner: 2008, 2012

Kalle Samooja (born 25 January 1988) is a Finnish professional golfer.

== Early life ==
Samooja was born in Turku, Finland. He started playing golf when he was eight years old after being introduced to the game by his father.

== Professional career ==
Samooja competed in the European Tour Qualifying School in 2008, 2009, 2010, 2013, and 2014. He did not make it onto the European Tour during any of these experiences. During this interim period he primarily played on the Asian Tour. He did not have a ton of success but recorded top-10 finishes at the 2012 Handa Faldo Cambodian Classic and 2015 Philippine Open.

In 2016, Samooja made it on to the European Tour's developmental tour, the Challenge Tour. Samooja finished 69th and 71st on the Challenge Tour's Order of Merit in 2016 and 2017. In 2018, he won the Hainan Open and finished 4th on the Order of Merit earning a promotion to the European Tour.

In 2019, his rookie season on the European Tour, Samooja recorded four top-25 finishes through the first half of the year including a top-10 at the Kenya Open. Samooja would then play excellently at the Omega European Masters that summer. Samooja fired a third round 62 (−8) to get near the lead. During the final round he fired a 67 to tie several players at the end of regulation. The five-way playoff included: Rory McIlroy, Sebastian Söderberg, Samooja, Lorenzo Gagli, and Andrés Romero. Samooja had the closest approach to the hole, to five feet. Söderberg made an eight-foot birdie putt and the other competitors missed. Samooja, putting last, would "miss narrowly" assuring Söderberg's victory.

Samooja would have one more top-10 during the season, a T-10 at the Nedbank Golf Challenge. These three top-10s helped him finish 62nd on the Order of Merit and thereby keep his card.

In June 2022, Samooja won the Porsche European Open shooting a final-round 64 (−8) to claim his first European Tour victory.

In December 2023, Samooja entered the LIV Golf Promotions event, vying for one of three places in the 2024 LIV Golf League. He recorded rounds of 65 and 71 on the final day to top the event, successfully earning status for the 2024 season. He joined Martin Kaymer's Cleeks GC team but only managed two points scoring finishes during the season to finish in the relegation zone and lose his place on the league. Prior to the start of the 2025 LIV Golf League, it was announced that he would be one of the reserves for the season.

Samooja spent 2026 on the Asian Tour, where he was runner-up at the Link Hong Kong Open, and finished 23rd in the season rankings.

== Amateur wins ==
- 2009 French International Amateur Championship

== Professional wins (12) ==
=== European Tour wins (1) ===
| No. | Date | Tournament | Winning score | Margin of victory | Runner-up |
|---|---|---|---|---|---|
| 1 | 5 Jun 2022 | Porsche European Open | −6 (72-72-74-64=282) | 2 strokes | (Netherlands) Wil Besseling |

European Tour playoff record (0–2)

| No. | Year | Tournament | Opponent(s) | Result |
|---|---|---|---|---|
| 1 | 2019 | Omega European Masters | (Italy) Lorenzo Gagli, (Northern Ireland) Rory McIlroy, (Argentina) Andrés Romero, (Sweden) Sebastian Söderberg | Söderberg won with birdie on first extra hole |
| 2 | 2020 | Aphrodite Hills Cyprus Open | (England) Callum Shinkwin | Lost to birdie on first extra hole |

=== Challenge Tour wins (1) ===
| No. | Date | Tournament | Winning score | Margin of victory | Runner-up |
|---|---|---|---|---|---|
| 1 | 14 Oct 2018 | Hainan Open^{1} | −15 (65-66-71-71=273) | 2 strokes | (Scotland) Grant Forrest |

^{1}Co-sanctioned by the China Tour

=== Nordic Golf League wins (2) ===
| No. | Date | Tournament | Winning score | Margin of victory | Runner-up |
|---|---|---|---|---|---|
| 1 | 21 Sep 2008 | FGT Final (as an amateur) | −3 (72-73-68=213) | 1 stroke | (Finland) Pasi Purhonen |
| 2 | 23 Mar 2014 | La Manga Club Championship | −12 (69-66-68=203) | 2 strokes | (Sweden) Jacob Glennemo |

=== Finnish Tour wins (8) ===
| No. | Date | Tournament | Winning score | Margin of victory | Runner(s)-up |
|---|---|---|---|---|---|
| 1 | 13 Aug 2006 | SM Reikäpeli (as an amateur) | 20 holes | | (Finland) Tommy Gulin |
| 2 | 29 Jul 2007 | SM Reikäpeli (2) (as an amateur) | 2 and 1 | | (Finland) Pertti Palosuo |
| 3 | 4 Jun 2011 | Finnish Tour Opening | E (69-76-71=216) | 1 stroke | (Finland) Joonas Granberg |
| 4 | 11 Jun 2011 | Finnish Tour St. Laurence | −9 (70-66-71=207) | 1 stroke | (Finland) Joonas Granberg |
| 5 | 9 Jun 2012 | Finnish Tour St. Laurence (2) | −15 (65-67-69=201) | 7 strokes | (Finland) Teemu Bakker (a), (Finland) Ossi Mikkola |
| 6 | 31 May 2013 | Finnish Tour St. Laurence (3) | −8 (72-67-69=208) | 1 stroke | (Finland) Jaakko Mäkitalo, (Finland) Lauri Ruuska (a) |
| 7 | 18 Jun 2016 | Audi Finnish Tour 4 | −6 (71-69-70=210) | 6 strokes | (Finland) Otto Vanhatalo (a) |
| 8 | 15 Sep 2016 | Audi Finnish Tour Final | −14 (67-71-64=202) | 5 strokes | (Finland) Matti Meriläinen |

== Results in major championships ==
| Tournament | 2021 | 2022 | 2023 |
|---|---|---|---|
| Masters Tournament | | | |
| PGA Championship | CUT | | |
| U.S. Open | | CUT | |
| The Open Championship | | | CUT |

Did not play

CUT = missed the half-way cut

== Team appearances ==
Amateur

- European Boys' Team Championship (representing Finland): 2005, 2006
- European Amateur Team Championship (representing Finland): 2008, 2009, 2010
- Eisenhower Trophy (representing Finland): 2010
- St Andrews Trophy (representing Continent of Europe): 2010 (winners)

== See also ==
- 2018 Challenge Tour graduates
