= Robert MacIntyre =

Scottish professional golfer (born 1996)

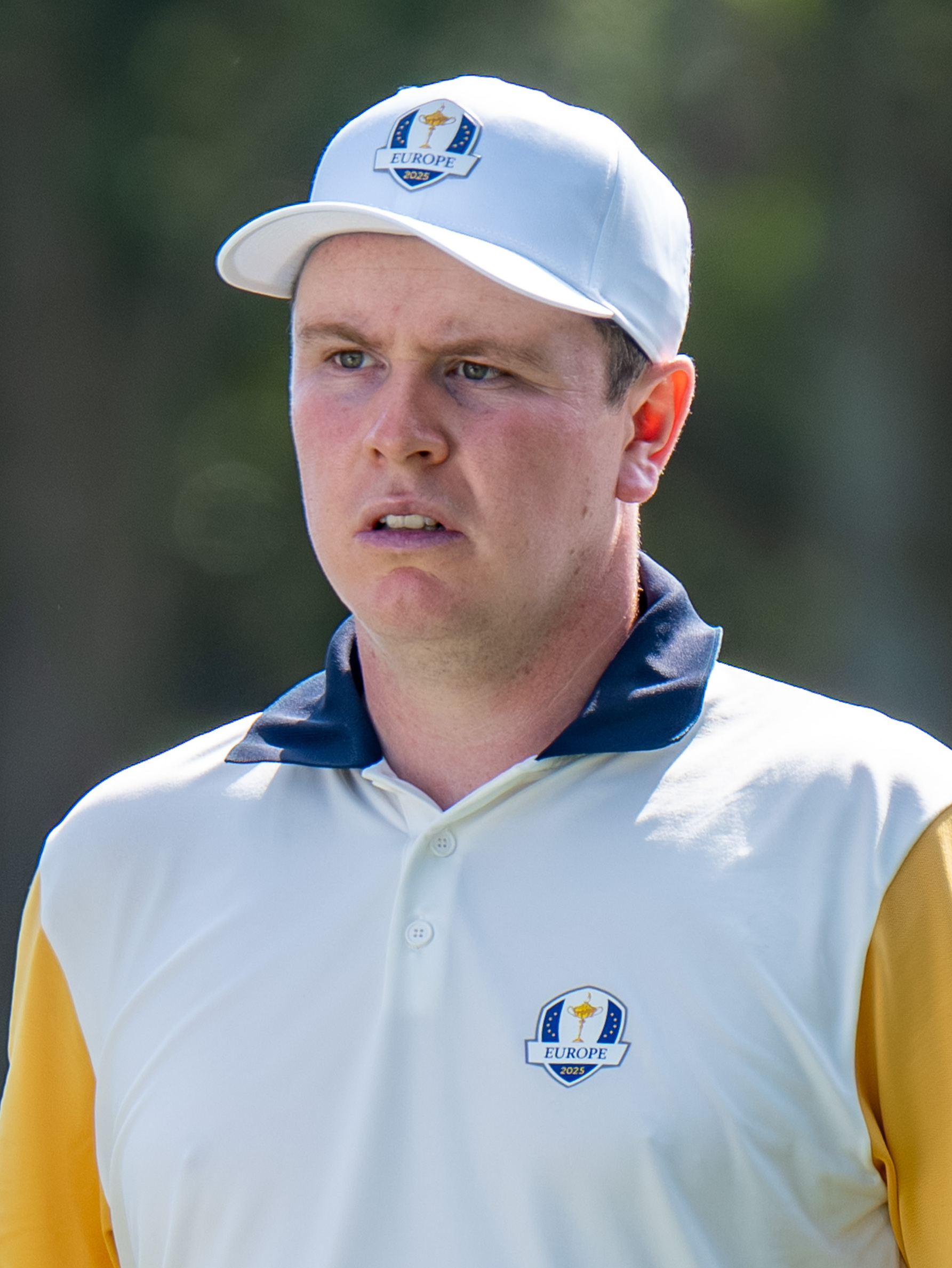
- MacIntyre at the 2025 Ryder Cup

Personal information
- Full name: Robert Duncan MacIntyre
- Nationality: Scotland
- Born: 3 August 1996 (age 30) Oban, Scotland
- Height: 1.80 m (5 ft 11 in)

Career
- Sport: Golf
- College: McNeese State University
- Turned professional: 2017
- Current tours: European Tour; PGA Tour
- Former tour: Challenge Tour
- Professional wins: 6
- Highest ranking: 5 (25 January 2026) (as of 25 October 2026)

Number of wins by tour
- PGA Tour: 2
- European Tour: 4
- Other: 1

Best results in major championships
- Masters Tournament: T12: 2021
- PGA Championship: T8: 2024
- U.S. Open: 2nd: 2025
- The Open Championship: T6: 2019

Achievements and awards
- Sir Henry Cotton Rookie of the Year: 2019
- European Tour Graduate of the Year: 2019

Robert Duncan MacIntyre (born 3 August 1996) is a left-handed Scottish professional golfer who plays on the European Tour and PGA Tour.

== Amateur career ==
MacIntyre had a successful amateur career. In 2013 he won both the Scottish Youths Championship and the Scottish Boys Open Stroke-Play Championship. He won the Scottish Amateur in 2015. In 2016 he lost 2&1 to Scott Gregory in the final of the Amateur Championship at Royal Porthcawl Golf Club. MacIntyre represented Scotland in the 2016 Eisenhower Trophy and played in the 2017 Walker Cup. He attended McNeese State University from 2014 to 2015.

== Professional career ==
MacIntyre turned professional in late 2017. In October, he played his first two events as a professional, on the MENA Golf Tour, finishing tied for third place in the Jordan's Ayla Golf Championship and then winning the Sahara Kuwait Championship.

In November 2017, MacIntyre made the final stage of the European Tour Q-school. He finished tied for 37th place to secure a 2018 Challenge Tour card. In August 2018, he lost to Kim Koivu in a playoff for the Vierumäki Finnish Challenge and then had an exceptional end to the season. He finished tied for fourth in the Monaghan Irish Challenge, lost a playoff to Víctor Perez in the Foshan Open and tied for 6th in the Ras Al Khaimah Challenge Tour Grand Final. His good finish to the season lifted him to 12th in the Challenge Tour Order of Merit, to earn a place on the European Tour for 2019.

MacIntyre was a joint runner-up in the 2019 Betfred British Masters, helped by an eagle-birdie finish. Two weeks later he was runner-up in the Made in Denmark tournament, a stroke behind Bernd Wiesberger. In July 2019, MacIntyre made his Open Championship debut at Royal Portrush, finishing in a tie for sixth. On 14 October, MacIntyre became the leading Scot on the Official World Golf Ranking for the first time after finishing in a tie for fourth at the Italian Open. MacIntyre finished the season as the leading rookie on the Race to Dubai rankings (11th place) which earned him the Sir Henry Cotton Rookie of the Year award.

In November 2020, MacIntyre claimed his first European Tour title at the Aphrodite Hills Cyprus Showdown. With the final round cut to 19 players due to knockout format of the event; MacIntyre's final round 64 was enough to seal the victory and beat Masahiro Kawamura by one shot.

In September 2022, MacIntyre won his second European Tour event at the DS Automobiles Italian Open. He shot a final-round 64 to join Matt Fitzpatrick in a playoff. He won the playoff on the first extra hole with a birdie.

=== 2023–24: Ryder Cup success and first PGA Tour win ===
In July 2023, MacIntyre shot a 64, including a birdie on the final hole, in the final round of the Genesis Scottish Open. He was eventually beaten by Rory McIlroy by one shot. In September, MacIntyre played on the European team in the 2023 Ryder Cup at Marco Simone Golf and Country Club in Guidonia, Rome, Italy. The European team won 16.5–11.5 and MacIntyre went 2–0–1 including a win in his Sunday singles match against Wyndham Clark. At the end of the 2023 European Tour season, MacIntyre claimed one of the 10 available PGA Tour cards for the leading players on the Race to Dubai, giving him playing status for the 2024 season.

After struggling early with only one top-10 finish in ten starts, MacIntyre finished T8 at the Zurich Classic of New Orleans with playing partner, Thomas Detry. In May 2024, he finished tied for 8th at the PGA Championship, his first top-10 at a major since the 2021 Open Championship.

In June 2024, MacIntyre claimed his first PGA Tour win at the RBC Canadian Open. He shot a final round 68 to finish one shot ahead of Ben Griffin.

One month later, MacIntyre won the Genesis Scottish Open with a birdie on the final hole to beat Adam Scott by one shot. With the win, MacIntyre became only the second Scot to win twice in one PGA Tour season, joining Sandy Lyle in 1988.

=== 2025–26 ===
In the 2025 U.S Open at Oakmont Country Club, MacIntyre finished in second position. Having started his final-round seven strokes behind the leader, he shot a two-under-par round on the final day to finish at one-over-par for the tournament, two strokes behind champion J. J. Spaun. At the 2025 BMW Championship, he held a four-stroke lead over Scottie Scheffler after the penultimate round. After carding a final round of three-over-par, he finished the event runner-up, two strokes behind Scheffler, at −13. Afterwards, MacIntyre said "Right now I want to go and smash up my golf clubs".

MacIntyre was a member of the European team that triumphed 15‍–‍13 over the United States in the 2025 Ryder Cup at Bethpage Black. He finished the event with a 1‍–‍1‍–‍1 record, which included a tie with Sam Burns in the singles. The following week, he secured his fourth European Tour victory with a four-stroke success at the Alfred Dunhill Links Championship, and became the first Scotsman to win the event since 2005.

At the 2026 Players Championship in March, MacIntyre finished in fourth place. In April, he finished in a tie for second at the Valero Texas Open, one stroke behind Spaun. In July, he ended in a tie for third at the Genesis Scottish Open.

== Personal life ==
Growing up in Oban, Scotland, MacIntyre played shinty as a teenager for Oban Camanachd.

MacIntyre's father, Dougie, is the head greenkeeper at Glencruitten Golf Club in Oban. Dougie acted as his caddie during his victory at the 2024 RBC Canadian Open. His cousins, Oscar and Jacob MacIntyre are both professional footballers.

== Amateur wins ==
- 2011 SGU Junior Tour Event 2
- 2013 Scottish Youths Stroke Play, Scottish Boys Open Stroke Play
- 2014 Sir Henry Cooper Junior Masters
- 2015 Sam Hall Intercollegiate, Scottish Amateur, Wyoming Cowboy Classic (tied)
- 2016 Scottish Champion of Champions

== Professional wins (6) ==
=== PGA Tour wins (2) ===
No.	Date	Tournament	Winning score	Margin of victory	Runner-up
1	2 Jun 2024	RBC Canadian Open	−16 (64-66-66-68=264)	1 stroke	(United States) Ben Griffin
2	14 Jul 2024	Genesis Scottish Open^{1}	−18 (67-65-63-67=262)	1 stroke	(Australia) Adam Scott

^{1}Co-sanctioned by the European Tour

=== European Tour wins (4) ===
Legend
Rolex Series (1)
Other European Tour (3)

No.	Date	Tournament	Winning score	Margin of victory	Runner-up
1	8 Nov 2020	Aphrodite Hills Cyprus Showdown	−7 (64) (Note: Earlier round scores: 65-68-67.)	1 stroke	(Japan) Masahiro Kawamura
2	18 Sep 2022	DS Automobiles Italian Open	−14 (70-69-67-64=270)	Playoff	(England) Matt Fitzpatrick
3	14 Jul 2024	Genesis Scottish Open^{1}	−18 (67-65-63-67=262)	1 stroke	(Australia) Adam Scott
4	5 Oct 2025	Alfred Dunhill Links Championship	−18 (66-66-66=198) (Note: Shortened to 54 holes due to weather.)	4 strokes	(England) Tyrrell Hatton

^{1}Co-sanctioned by the PGA Tour

European Tour playoff record (1–0)

No.	Year	Tournament	Opponent	Result
1	2022	DS Automobiles Italian Open	(England) Matt Fitzpatrick	Won with birdie on first extra hole

=== MENA Golf Tour wins (1) ===
No.	Date	Tournament	Winning score	Margin of victory	Runner-up
1	18 Oct 2017	Sahara Kuwait Championship	−14 (65-66-65=196)	2 strokes	(England) Luke Joy

== Playoff record ==
Challenge Tour playoff record (0–2)

No.	Year	Tournament	Opponent	Result
1	2018	Vierumäki Finnish Challenge	(Finland) Kim Koivu	Lost to birdie on first extra hole
2	2018	Foshan Open	(France) Victor Perez	Lost to birdie on first extra hole

== Results in major championships ==
Results not in chronological order in 2020.

Tournament	2019	2020	2021	2022	2023	2024	2025	2026
Masters Tournament			T12	T23			CUT	CUT
PGA Championship		T66	T49	77	CUT	T8	T47	CUT
U.S. Open		T56	T35			CUT	2	T39
The Open Championship	T6	NT	T8	T34	T71	T50	T7	T28

Top 10
Did not play

CUT = missed the half-way cut
"T" = tied
NT = no tournament due to COVID-19 pandemic

=== Summary ===
Tournament	Wins	2nd	3rd	Top-5	Top-10	Top-25	Events	Cuts made
Masters Tournament	0	0	0	0	0	2	4	2
PGA Championship	0	0	0	0	1	1	7	5
U.S. Open	0	1	0	1	1	1	5	4
The Open Championship	0	0	0	0	3	3	7	7
Totals	0	1	0	1	5	7	23	18

- Most consecutive cuts made – 10 (2019 Open Championship – 2022 Open Championship)
- Longest streak of top-10s – 2 (2025 U.S. Open – 2025 Open Championship)

== Results in The Players Championship ==
Tournament	2021	2022	2023	2024	2025	2026
The Players Championship	CUT			CUT	9	4

Top 10
Did not play

CUT = missed the halfway cut

== Results in World Golf Championships ==
Tournament	2019	2020	2021	2022
Championship		T42	T61	
Match Play		NT^{1}	R16	T35
Invitational		T59	T15	
Champions	T17	NT^{1}	NT^{1}	NT^{1}

^{1}Cancelled due to COVID-19 pandemic

Top 10
Did not play

NT = No tournament
"T" = Tied
QF, R16, R32, R64 = Round in which player lost in match play
Note that the Championship and Invitational were discontinued from 2022.

== Team appearances ==
Amateur

- European Boys' Team Championship (representing Scotland): 2013, 2014
- Jacques Léglise Trophy (representing Great Britain & Ireland): 2013 (winners)
- Summer Youth Olympics (representing Great Britain): 2014
- European Amateur Team Championship (representing Scotland): 2016 (winners), 2017
- St Andrews Trophy (representing Great Britain and Ireland): 2016 (tie)
- Eisenhower Trophy (representing Scotland): 2016
- Walker Cup (representing Great Britain & Ireland): 2017

Professional

- Hero Cup (representing Great Britain & Ireland): 2023
- Ryder Cup (representing Europe): 2023 (winners), 2025 (winners)

Ryder Cup points record
2023	2025	Total
2.5	1.5	4

== See also ==
- 2018 Challenge Tour graduates
- 2023 Race to Dubai dual card winners
