= Yunnan Open =

Belt & Road Colorful Yunnan Open
Tournament information
- Location: Kunming, Yunnan, China
- Established: 2014
- Course: Kunming Yulongwan Golf Club
- Par: 71
- Length: 7,158 yards (6,545 m)
- Tours: Challenge Tour; PGA Tour China; China Tour
- Format: Stroke play
- Prize fund: US$350,000
- Month played: April
- Final year: 2018

Tournament record score
- Aggregate: 259 Josh Geary (2017)
- To par: −25 as above

Final champion
- (Finland) Kim Koivu

Location map
- Location in China

The Yunnan Open was a golf tournament on the Challenge Tour, the China Tour and the PGA Tour China, held 2018 at the Kunming Yulongwan Golf Club in Yunnan Province, China. The tournament was co-sanctioned by the PGA Tour China and one of three events held in China on the 2018 Challenge Tour, along with the Hainan Open and the Foshan Open.

== Winners ==
Year	Tour(s) (Note: CHA − Challenge Tour; CHN − China Tour; PGATCHN − PGA Tour China.)	Winner	Score	To par	Margin of victory	Runner(s)-up	Ref.
Belt & Road Colorful Yunnan Open
2018	CHA, CHN	(Finland) Kim Koivu	268	−16	4 strokes	(England) Marcus Armitage (Denmark) Joachim B. Hansen	
Yulongwan Yunnan Open
2017	CHN	(New Zealand) Josh Geary (2)	259	−25	7 strokes	(Thailand) Gunn Charoenkul	
2016	PGATCHN	(China) Dou Zecheng	261	−23	3 strokes	(United States) Charlie Saxon	
2015	PGATCHN	(New Zealand) Josh Geary	266	−22	1 stroke	(Thailand) Gunn Charoenkul	
2014	PGATCHN	(Thailand) Gunn Charoenkul	263	−21	6 strokes	(Hong Kong) Hak Shunyat	
