= Finnish Open (golf) =

Tournament information
- Location: Kyrkslätt, Finland
- Established: 1988
- Course: Peuramaa Golf
- Par: 72
- Length: 6,701 yards (6,127 m)
- Tours: Challenge Tour; Swedish Golf Tour; Nordic Golf League
- Format: Stroke play
- Prize fund: €50,000
- Month played: August

Tournament record score
- Aggregate: 264 Jamie Elson (2003)
- To par: −24 as above

Current champion
- (Sweden) David Nyfjäll

Location map
- Location in Finland

The Finnish Open is a golf tournament played in Finland, currently on the Nordic Golf League. It was formerly an event on the Challenge Tour from 1990 until 2004. It was played at Espoon Golfseura in Espoo, Finland. It was founded as the Scandinavian Tipo Trophy before being sponsored by Volvo from 1991.

== Winners ==
Year	Tour (Note: CHA − Challenge Tour; NGL − Nordic Golf League; SWE − Swedish Golf Tour.)	Winner	Score	To par	Margin of victory	Runner(s)-up
Finnish Open
2026	NGL	(Sweden) David Nyfjäll	196	−17	2 strokes	(Denmark) Jesper Hagborg Asp (Denmark) Morten Ørum Madsen (Sweden) Sebastian Petersen (Sweden) Albin Tidén
2025	NGL	(Denmark) Jacob Worm Agerschou	207	−9	Playoff	(Finland) Niklas Lindström (a)
Timberwise Finnish Open
2024	NGL	(Denmark) Victor Sidal Svendsen	209	−7	1 stroke	(Denmark) Anders Emil Ejlersen (Finland) Ville Virkkala (a)
2023	NGL	(Finland) Rasmus Karlsson	202	−14	3 strokes	(Finland) Juuso Kahlos
2022	NGL	(Sweden) Viktor Edin	211	−5	2 strokes	(Sweden) Niclas Wieland
2021	NGL	(Sweden) Christopher Feldborg Nielsen	206	−10	4 strokes	(Sweden) Joakim Wikström
2020	NGL	Cancelled due to the COVID-19 pandemic				
2019	NGL	(Sweden) Anton Wilbertsson	206	−10	1 stroke	(Norway) Jarand Ekeland Arnøy (Iceland) Haraldur Magnús
2018	NGL	(Sweden) Stefan Idstam	205	−11	1 stroke	(Finland) Alex Hietala (a)
Polarputki Finnish Open
2017	NGL	(Denmark) Victor Østerby	200	−16	2 strokes	(Denmark) Christian Gløët
Ålandsbanken Finnish Open
2016	NGL	(Denmark) Jesper Lerchedahl	207	−9	3 strokes	(Sweden) Oliver Gillberg (Sweden) Niklas Lindström
Finnish Open
2015	NGL	(Finland) Tapio Pulkkanen (2)	207	−9	4 strokes	(Denmark) Rasmus Hjelm Nielsen
2014	NGL	(Norway) Elias Bertheussen	206	−10	4 strokes	(Finland) Antti Ahokas
2013	NGL	(Denmark) Kasper Kjær Estrup	204	−12	2 strokes	(Sweden) Alexander Björk (Sweden) Jonas Magnusson
TehoSport Finnish Open
2012	NGL	(Finland) Tapio Pulkkanen (a)	202	−14	4 strokes	(Sweden) Pontus Leijon
Finnish Open
2011	NGL	(Denmark) Morten Ørum Madsen	206	−10	6 strokes	(Finland) Joonas Granberg (Finland) Jonas Haglund
2008–2010: No tournament
Sunny Trading Finnish Open
2007	NGL	(Finland) Thomas Sundström	215	−1	Playoff	(Finland) Immu Korvenmaa
Finnish Open
2006	NGL	(Finland) Jaakko Mäkitalo	206	−10	2 strokes	(Finland) Janne Martikainen (Finland) Tuomas Tuovinen
2005: No tournament
Volvo Finnish Open
2004	CHA	(Finland) Roope Kakko (a)	202 (Note: Shortened to 54 holes due to rain.)	−11	Playoff	(England) Phillip Archer (Sweden) Johan Axgren
2003	CHA	(England) Jamie Elson	264	−24	2 strokes	(Austria) Martin Wiegele
2002	CHA	(Denmark) Thomas Nørret	273	−15	1 stroke	(Germany) Gary Birch Jr.
2001	CHA	(Sweden) Peter Hedblom	274	−14	Playoff	(Denmark) Mads Vibe-Hastrup
2000	CHA	(South Africa) Jean Hugo	273	−15	5 strokes	(Sweden) Magnus Persson Atlevi (Denmark) Nils Roerbaek-Petersen
1999	CHA	(Sweden) Paul Nilbrink	281	−7	Playoff	(Argentina) Gustavo Rojas
1998	CHA	(France) Christian Cévaër	280	−8	1 stroke	(Sweden) Fredrik Larsson (Sweden) Daniel Westermark
1997	CHA	(Denmark) Søren Kjeldsen	276	−12	3 strokes	(Norway) Thomas Nielsen (Sweden) Leif Westerberg
1996	CHA	(Sweden) Björn Bäck	282	−6	3 strokes	(Sweden) Tony Edlund
1995	CHA	(Sweden) Fredrik Plahn	212	−4	2 strokes	(Sweden) Dennis Edlund (Sweden) Robert Jonsson (Sweden) Magnus Persson
1994	CHA	(Finland) Mikael Piltz	210	−6	Playoff	(Sweden) Joakim Grönhagen
1993	CHA	(Sweden) Per Nyman	208	−8	2 strokes	(Sweden) Daniel Fornstam
1992	CHA	(Sweden) Henrik Bergquist	208	−8	3 strokes	(Finland) Mikael Piltz
1991	CHA	(Sweden) Fredrik Larsson	209	−7	Playoff	(Sweden) Jarmo Sandelin
Scandinavian Tipo Trophy
1990	CHA	(Sweden) Fredrik Lindgren	215	−1	Playoff	(Sweden) Mats Sterner
1989	CHA	(Denmark) René Michelsen	217	+1	Playoff	(Sweden) Magnus Hennberg
1988	SWE	(Sweden) Daniel Westermark	214	−2	3 strokes	(Sweden) Mikael Karlsson (Sweden) Nils-Åke Sandell

== See also ==
- Open golf tournament
