= Finnish Challenge =

Vierumäki Finnish Challenge
Tournament information
- Location: Vierumäki, Finland
- Established: 2001
- Course: Vierumäki Resort
- Par: 72
- Length: 7,074 yards (6,468 m)
- Tour: Challenge Tour
- Format: Stroke play
- Prize fund: €300,000
- Month played: August

Tournament record score
- Aggregate: 257 Lauri Ruuska (2023)
- To par: −27 as above

Current champion
- (Germany) Dominic Foos

Location map
- Location in Finland

The Finnish Challenge is a golf tournament on the Challenge Tour. It was first played at Golf Talma in Talma, Finland, from 2001 to 2003, but took a hiatus from 2004 to 2011. The 2012–14 editions of the tournament were played at the Kytäjä Golf Club in Kytäjä, Hyvinkää, Finland. The 2015 tournament was played at Aura Golf Club in Turku. Since 2016, the tournament has been played at the Vierumäki Resort in Vierumäki.

In 2023, Lauri Ruuska recorded a round of 59, becoming the fourth sub-60 round on the Challenge Tour.

== Winners ==
Year	Winner	Score	To par	Margin of victory	Runner(s)-up	Venue
Vierumäki Finnish Challenge
2026	(Germany) Dominic Foos (2)	267	−21	1 stroke	(Denmark) Jonathan Gøth-Rasmussen	Vierumäki
2025	(Scotland) David Law	271	−17	2 strokes	(Sweden) Jonas Blixt (England) Alfie Plant	Vierumäki
2024	(Sweden) Christofer Blomstrand	268	−20	1 stroke	(France) Alexander Lévy (Sweden) Mikael Lindberg	Vierumäki
2023	(Finland) Lauri Ruuska	257	−27	7 strokes	(Scotland) Jack McDonald (Sweden) Joakim Wikström	Vierumäki
2022	(Germany) Velten Meyer	262	−26	5 strokes	(Germany) Marc Hammer	Vierumäki
2021	(Denmark) Marcus Helligkilde	265	−23	2 strokes	(Sweden) Jesper Svensson	Vierumäki
2020	Cancelled due to the COVID-19 pandemic					
2019	(Portugal) José-Filipe Lima	274	−14	1 stroke	(South Africa) Bryce Easton	Vierumäki
2018	(Finland) Kim Koivu	267	−21	Playoff	(Scotland) Robert MacIntyre	Vierumäki
2017	(England) Paul Howard	199 (Note: Shortened to 54 holes due to rain.)	−17	2 strokes	(Sweden) Simon Forsström	Vierumäki
2016	(England) Sam Walker	273	−15	2 strokes	(France) Julien Guerrier (Scotland) Scott Henry (France) Romain Langasque (Netherlands) Darius van Driel	Vierumäki
Gant Open
2015	(Germany) Dominic Foos	270	−14	3 strokes	(Spain) José Manuel Lara (Scotland) Jamie McLeary (Germany) Marcel Schneider (South Africa) Brandon Stone	Aura
Vacon Open
2014	(Chile) Mark Tullo	264	−20	3 strokes	(Sweden) Pelle Edberg	Kytäjä
Finnish Challenge
2013	(Wales) Stuart Manley	267	−21	2 strokes	(Portugal) José-Filipe Lima	Kytäjä
2012	(Sweden) Kristoffer Broberg	269	−15	6 strokes	(Netherlands) Wil Besseling	Kytäjä
2004–2011: No tournament
Talma Finnish Challenge
2003	(Australia) Marcus Fraser	275	−13	Playoff	(Sweden) Tony Edlund	Talma
2002	(England) Lee S. James	269	−19	2 strokes	(England) Matthew Blackey	Talma
2001	(Sweden) Klas Eriksson	272	−16	4 strokes	(England) Gary Clark	Talma
