= Taco Remkes =

Dutch professional golfer (born 1984)

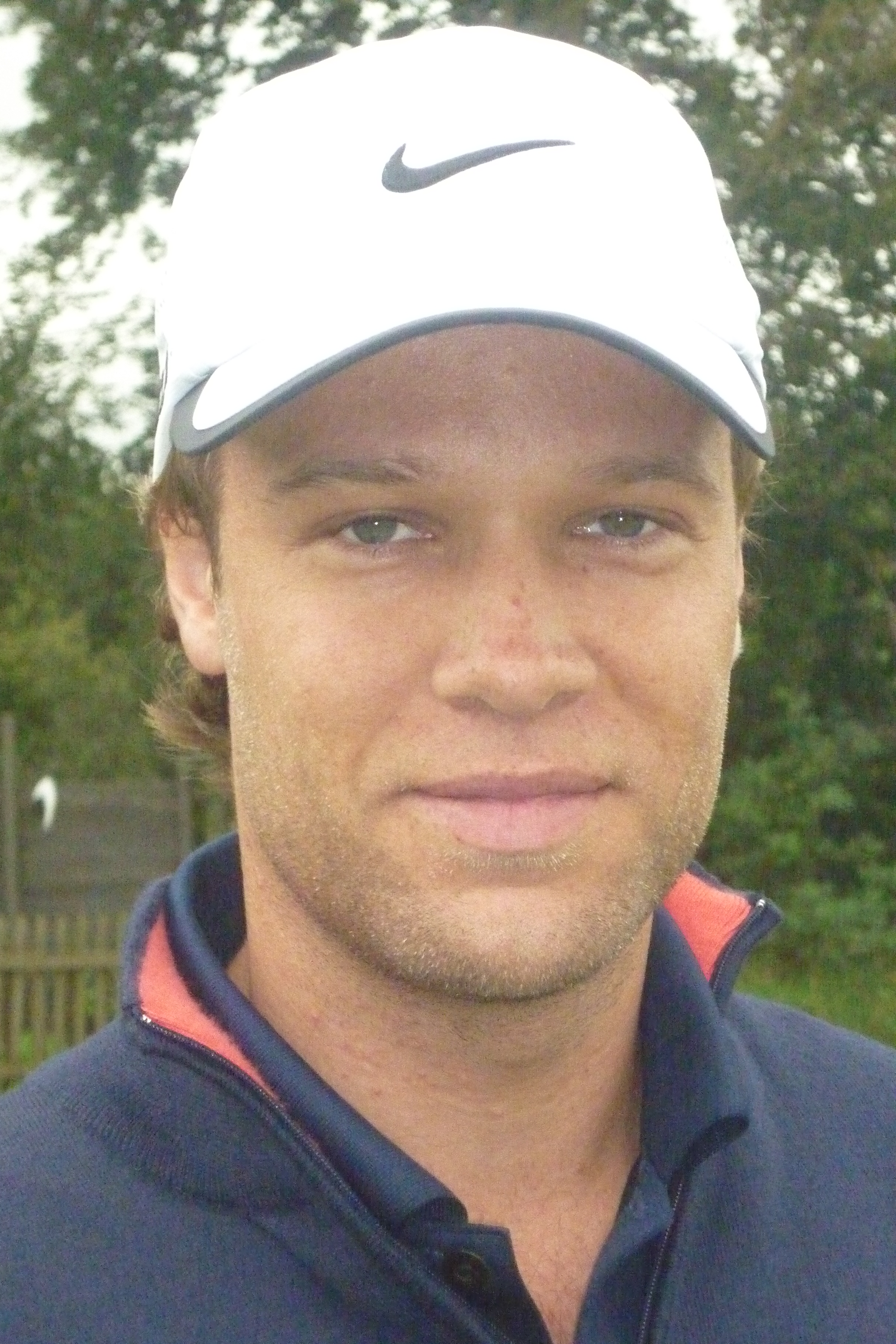

Personal information
- Nationality: Netherlands
- Born: 20 November 1984 (age 41) Amsterdam, Netherlands
- Height: 5 ft 9 in (1.75 m)

Career
- Sport: Golf
- Turned professional: 2004
- Former tours: European Tour; Challenge Tour; EPD Tour
- Professional wins: 5

Number of wins by tour
- Challenge Tour: 3
- Other: 2

Taco Remkes (born 20 November 1984) is a Dutch professional golfer who formerly played on the European Tour and Challenge Tour.

== Professional career ==
Remkes turned professional in 2004. He played on the EPD Tour in 2007, winning twice and finishing second on the Order of Merit, earning status to play on the 2008 Challenge Tour.

Remkes won three times on the Challenge Tour in 2008, earning a card for the 2009 European Tour season, also finishing third in the season-long rankings.

His best finish on the European Tour was T12 at the 2009 Joburg Open.

== Professional wins (5) ==
=== Challenge Tour wins (3) ===
No.	Date	Tournament	Winning score	Margin of victory	Runner(s)-up
1	29 Jun 2008	Scottish Challenge	−13 (68-70-67-66=271)	5 strokes	(England) Seve Benson, (Denmark) Jeppe Huldahl
2	28 Sep 2008	Dutch Futures	−13 (72-68-69-66=275)	Playoff	(Denmark) Jeppe Huldahl
3	18 Oct 2008	Margara Diehl-Ako Platinum Open	−18 (69-63-65-73=270)	Playoff	(Finland) Roope Kakko

Challenge Tour playoff record (2–0)

No.	Year	Tournament	Opponent	Result
1	2008	Dutch Futures	(Denmark) Jeppe Huldahl	Won with birdie on first extra hole
2	2008	Margara Diehl-Ako Platinum Open	(Finland) Roope Kakko	Won with birdie on first extra hole

=== EPD Tour wins (2) ===
No.	Date	Tournament	Winning score	Margin of victory	Runner-up
1	25 Jul 2007	Augsburg Classic	−6 (70-72-68=210)	1 stroke	(England) Lee Corfield
2	9 Sep 2007	Polish Open	−10 (68-71-66-73=278)	1 stroke	(Switzerland) Damian Ulrich

== See also ==
- 2008 Challenge Tour graduates
- 2011 European Tour Qualifying School graduates
- List of golfers to achieve a three-win promotion from the Challenge Tour
