= Kim Koivu =

Finnish professional golfer

Personal information
- Nationality: Finland
- Born: 11 April 1991 (age 35) Helsinki, Finland

Career
- Sport: Golf
- College: Brevard College; Georgia Southern University
- Turned professional: 2017
- Current tour: Nordic Golf League
- Former tours: European Tour; Challenge Tour; Finnish Tour
- Professional wins: 7

Number of wins by tour
- Challenge Tour: 3
- Other: 4

Kim Koivu (born 11 April 1991) is a Finnish professional golfer who plays on the European Tour. He won three times on the 2018 Challenge Tour.

== Amateur career ==
Koivu attended Georgia Southern University from 2013 to 2015, having previously attended Brevard College for two years. Koivu played on the Nordic Golf League as an amateur during 2017. At the end of the season, he qualified for the final stage of the European Tour Q-school. He turned professional at the end of the season.

== Professional career ==
Koivu's success in reaching the final stage of the Q-school gained him entry to 2018 Challenge Tour events. He won his second event, the Belt & Road Colorful Yunnan Open, won again later in the season at the Vierumäki Finnish Challenge, where he beat Robert MacIntyre at the first hole of a playoff, and then won the Rolex Trophy two weeks later. His three wins earning him an immediate promotion to the European Tour.

== Amateur wins ==
- 2011 Fall LMU Invitational
- 2012 Cherokee Valley Invitational, Aramark Collegiate Invitational
- 2013 Irish Creek Intercollegiate

== Professional wins (7) ==
=== Challenge Tour wins (3) ===
No.	Date	Tournament	Winning score	Margin of victory	Runner(s)-up
1	15 Apr 2018	Belt & Road Colorful Yunnan Open^{1}	−16 (70-65-69-64=268)	4 strokes	(England) Marcus Armitage, (Denmark) Joachim B. Hansen
2	12 Aug 2018	Vierumäki Finnish Challenge	−21 (70-65-66-66=267)	Playoff	(Scotland) Robert MacIntyre
3	25 Aug 2018	Rolex Trophy	−22 (62-65-72-67=266)	6 strokes	(Germany) Marcel Schneider

^{1}Co-sanctioned by the China Tour

Challenge Tour playoff record (1–0)

No.	Year	Tournament	Opponent	Result
1	2018	Vierumäki Finnish Challenge	(Scotland) Robert MacIntyre	Won with birdie on first extra hole

=== Finnish Tour wins (4) ===
No.	Date	Tournament	Winning score	Margin of victory	Runner(s)-up
1	6 Jun 2015	Audi Finnish Tour 2 (as an amateur)	−5 (75-68-73=211)	2 strokes	(Finland) Kristian Kulokorpi (a)
2	8 May 2016	Audi Finnish Tour Opening (as an amateur)	−4 (76-67-69=212)	2 strokes	(Finland) Matias Honkala (a)
3	16 Jun 2018	NRG Open	−11 (63-67-75=205)	6 strokes	(Finland) Santeri Lehesmaa (a), (Finland) Jaakko Mäkitalo, (Finland) Mikael Salminen
4	30 Jul 2022	Finnish Tour 6	−9 (68-65-71=204)	Playoff	(Finland) Teemu Bakker

== Team appearances ==
Amateur

- European Amateur Team Championship (representing Finland): 2015, 2016
- Eisenhower Trophy (representing Finland): 2016

== See also ==
- List of golfers to achieve a three-win promotion from the Challenge Tour
- 2018 Challenge Tour graduates
