= Roope Kakko =

Finnish professional golfer (born 1982)

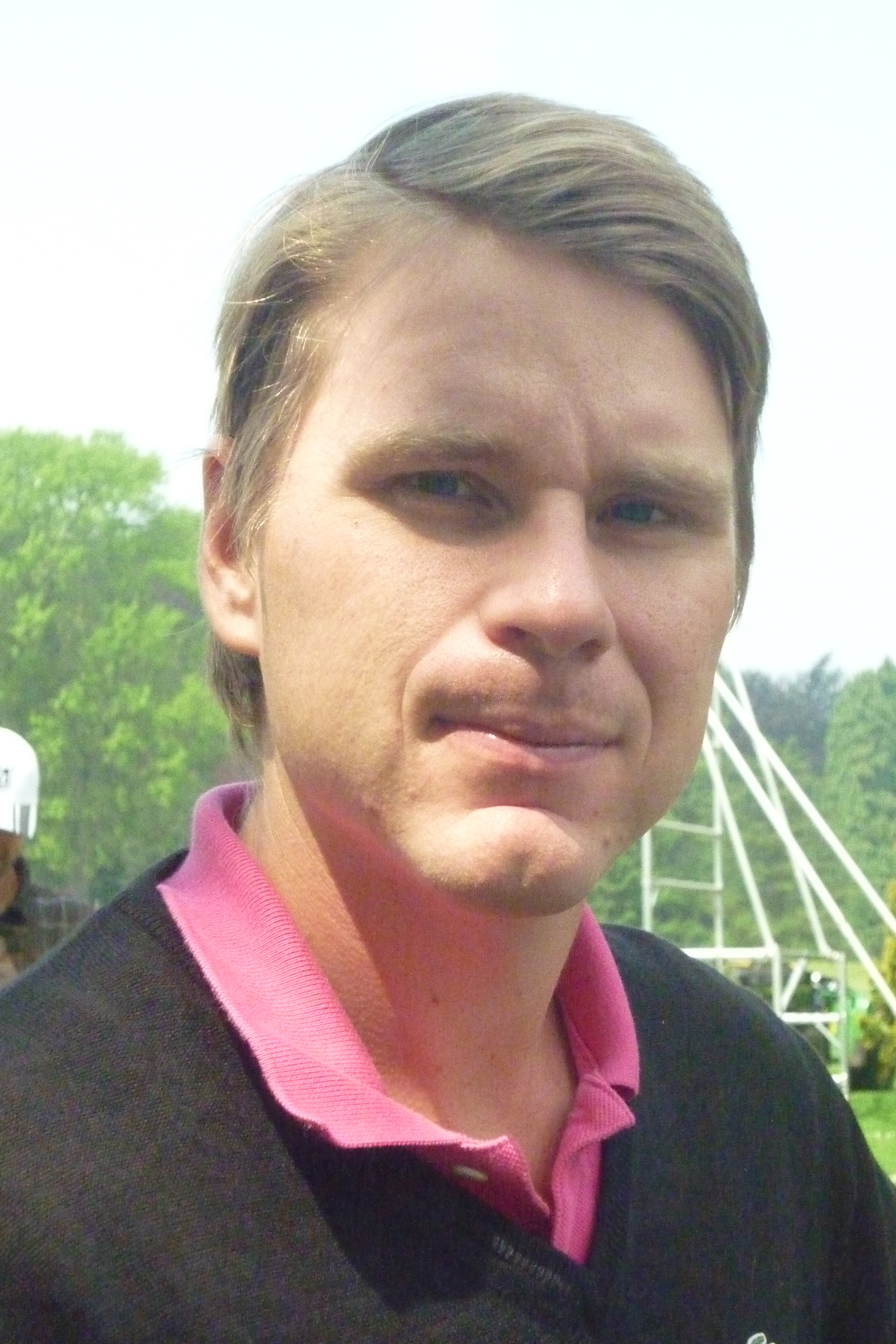

Personal information
- Nationality: Finland
- Born: 13 February 1982 (age 44) Espoo, Finland
- Height: 1.83 m (6 ft 0 in)
- Weight: 82 kg (181 lb; 12.9 st)
- Spouse: Minea Blomqvist
- Children: 2

Career
- Sport: Golf
- Turned professional: 2004
- Current tour: Finnish Tour
- Former tours: European Tour; Challenge Tour
- Professional wins: 8

Number of wins by tour
- European Tour: 1
- Challenge Tour: 3
- Other: 5

Achievements and awards
- Finnish Tour Order of Merit winner: 2024

Roope Kakko (born 13 February 1982) is a Finnish professional golfer.

== Early life and amateur career ==
Kakko was born in Espoo, Finland. He started playing golf at the age of five.

In 2004, Kakko became only the third amateur to win a tournament on the Challenge Tour, when he won his home event, the Volvo Finnish Open.

== Professional career ==
The win earned him a Challenge Tour card for the following season; having turned professional later in 2004, he joined the Challenge Tour full-time. He was a regular on the tour for the next five seasons, although he did not win again, with a best finish on the money list of 27th in 2008, when he was twice a runner-up. His strong 2008 season gained Kakko entry into a small number of European Tour events and he capitalised on those opportunities by making successive top-10 finishes at the 2009 BMW Italian Open and 3 Irish Open. Despite these successes, his limited playing opportunities meant Kakko returned to the Challenge Tour full-time in 2010, but at the end of that season he came through the Qualifying School to secure full membership of the European Tour for the first time. In October 2013, Kakko won at the National Bank of Oman Golf Classic on the Challenge Tour.

In August 2015, Kakko claimed his first victory on the European Tour at the Madeira Islands Open - Portugal - BPI. It was a dual-ranking European and Challenge Tour event.

In September 2024, Kakko won the final event of the 2024 Finnish Tour season, claiming the season-long Order of Merit title.

== Personal life ==
Kakko is married to former LPGA Tour golfer Minea Blomqvist; they have two children together.

== Professional wins (8) ==
=== European Tour wins (1) ===
No.	Date	Tournament	Winning score	Margin of victory	Runner-up
1	2 Aug 2015	Madeira Islands Open - Portugal - BPI^{1}	−24 (66-71-64-63=264)	3 strokes	(Scotland) Scott Henry

^{1}Dual-ranking event with the Challenge Tour

=== Challenge Tour wins (3) ===
No.	Date	Tournament	Winning score	Margin of victory	Runner(s)-up
1	4 Jul 2004	Volvo Finnish Open (as an amateur)	−11 (68-67-67=202) (Note: Shortened to 54 holes due to weather.)	Playoff	(England) Phillip Archer, (Sweden) Johan Axgren
2	27 Oct 2013	National Bank of Oman Golf Classic	−14 (70-69-66-69=274)	2 strokes	(Denmark) Lucas Bjerregaard
3	2 Aug 2015	Madeira Islands Open - Portugal - BPI^{1}	−24 (66-71-64-63=264)	3 strokes	(Scotland) Scott Henry

^{1}Dual-ranking event with the European Tour

Challenge Tour playoff record (1–1)

No.	Year	Tournament	Opponent(s)	Result
1	2004	Volvo Finnish Open (as an amateur)	(England) Phillip Archer, (Sweden) Johan Axgren	Won with birdie on first extra hole
2	2008	Margara Diehl-Ako Platinum Open	(Netherlands) Taco Remkes	Lost to birdie on first extra hole

=== Nordic Golf League wins (1) ===
No.	Date	Tournament	Winning score	Margin of victory	Runner-up
1	20 Jun 2004	Sonera Open (as an amateur)	−10 (68-67-71=206)	Playoff	(Finland) Heikki Mäntylä

=== Finnish Tour wins (4) ===
No.	Date	Tournament	Winning score	Margin of victory	Runner-up
1	15 Sep 2018	Vierumäki Tour Final	−15 (73-66-62=201)	8 strokes	(Finland) Jaakko Mäkitalo
2	7 Jun 2020	Finnish Tour I	−17 (66-66-67=199)	Playoff	(Finland) Matias Honkala
3	16 May 2021	Finnish Tour Opening	−1 (72-72-71=215)	Playoff	(Finland) Miki Kuronen
4	14 Sep 2024	Finnish Tour Final (2)	−10 (68-67-71=206)	Playoff	(Finland) Niclas Hellberg

== Team appearances ==
Amateur

- European Youths' Team Championship (representing Finland): 2002
- European Amateur Team Championship (representing Finland): 2003

Professional

- World Cup (representing Finland): 2008, 2013

== See also ==
- 2010 European Tour Qualifying School graduates
- 2013 Challenge Tour graduates
