= Joakim Grönhagen =

Swedish professional golfer (born 1972)

Personal information
- Nationality: Sweden
- Born: 25 October 1972 (age 54) Stockholm, Sweden
- Height: 182 cm (6 ft 0 in)

Career
- Sport: Golf
- Turned professional: 1993
- Former tours: European Tour; Challenge Tour
- Professional wins: 3

Number of wins by tour
- Challenge Tour: 1
- Other: 2

Joakim Grönhagen (born 25 October 1972) is a Swedish professional golfer who played on the Challenge Tour and European Tour.

== Career ==
Grönhagen played 121 tournaments on the Challenge Tour 1992–2001, including one win. In 1992, he was runner-up at the Siab Open. In 1994, he narrowly missed out on two victories, losing the Swedish Matchplay Championship final to Per Nyman 1 up, and losing a playoff at the Volvo Finnish Open to Mikael Piltz.

Grönhagen played on the 1995 European Tour with best finish T25 at Volvo Scandinavian Masters, ending up 138th in the season rankings.

After retiring from tour, Grönhagen became a golf instructor, coaching Simon Forsström and HRH Prince Daniel, Duke of Västergötland.

== Professional wins (3) ==
=== Challenge Tour wins (1) ===
No.	Date	Tournament	Winning score	Margin of victory	Runner(s)-up
1	3 Jul 1994	Västerås Open	−7 (67-65-68=200)	1 stroke	(Sweden) Thomas Nilsson, (Finland) Kalle Väinölä

Challenge Tour playoff record (0–1)

No.	Year	Tournament	Opponent	Result
1	1994	Volvo Finnish Open	(Finland) Mikael Piltz	Lost to birdie on second extra hole

=== Nordic Golf League wins (2) ===
No.	Date	Tournament	Winning score	Margin of victory	Runner-up
1	25 Apr 2001	Titleist Open	E (71-73-72=216)	2 strokes	(Sweden) Fredrik Berglund (a)
2	20 May 2001	Kinnaborg Open	−4 (66-70=136)	Playoff	(Sweden) Viktor Gustavsson

== See also ==
- List of golfers with most Challenge Tour wins
