= Sebastian Söderberg =

Swedish professional golfer (born 1990)

Personal information
- Full name: Jan Sebastian Söderberg
- Nationality: Sweden
- Born: 19 September 1990 (age 36) Eksjö, Sweden
- Height: 1.88 m (6 ft 2 in)
- Weight: 84 kg (185 lb; 13.2 st)

Career
- Sport: Golf
- College: Coastal Carolina University
- Turned professional: 2013
- Current tour: European Tour
- Former tours: Challenge Tour; Nordic Golf League
- Professional wins: 6
- Highest ranking: 86 (21 July 2024) (as of 25 October 2026)

Number of wins by tour
- European Tour: 1
- Challenge Tour: 2
- Other: 3

Best results in major championships
- Masters Tournament: DNP
- PGA Championship: T68: 2024
- U.S. Open: T53: 2022
- The Open Championship: 70th: 2025

Jan Sebastian Söderberg (born 19 September 1990) is a Swedish professional golfer. He plays on the European Tour, where he won the 2019 Omega European Masters and has seven runner-up finishes.

== Early life and amateur career ==
Söderberg was born in Eksjö in Småland, Sweden, but grew up playing golf at Delsjö Golf Club in Gothenburg on the west coast of the country. He won four junior tournaments in the Gothenburg area.

He was part of the Swedish team winning the 2008 European Boys' Team Championship at Bled Golf Club, Slovenia. He also represented Sweden twice at the European Amateur Team Championship.

Söderberg played college golf at Coastal Carolina University in Conway, South Carolina from 2009 to 2013, where he won twice.

His best World Amateur Golf Ranking was 51st.

== Professional career ==
Söderberg turned professional in August 2013 and won twice on the Nordic Golf League the following month.

In 2014, he played all three stages of the European Tour qualifying school, finishing 39th. This earned him membership of the Challenge Tour for 2015.

Söderberg then played on the European Tour and Challenge Tour in 2015. In 2016, he won the inaugural event of the 2016 Challenge Tour season, the Barclays Kenya Open.

In June 2016, through sectional qualifying in England, he qualified for his first major championship entry, the U.S. Open at Oakmont Country Club in Pennsylvania, where he missed the cut by two strokes.

In a high-quality field at the 2019 Omega European Masters in September at Crans-sur-Sierre Golf Club, Switzerland, on the European Tour, Söderberg found himself in a five-man playoff for the title after shooting a 14-under 266 score over 72 holes. One of Söderberg's competitors was the newly-crowned PGA Tour FedEx Cup Champion Rory McIlroy, who made five birdies in his last seven holes to catch the leaders. On the first extra hole, the par 4 18th, Söderberg claimed the biggest title of his career by making an eight-feet birdie putt. McIlroy and Kalle Samooja both had birdie-putts from shorter distances, but missed. The win in Switzerland earned Söderberg a first prize of €416,000, an exemption through the end of the 2021 European Tour season and moved him to a career-best (at that time) 107th on the Official World Golf Ranking. He finished the 2019 season 52nd on the Race to Dubai rankings.

In January 2020, Söderberg set a record for playing the fastest round on the European Tour. Teeing off first with a local marker and his caddie in the final round of the Omega Dubai Desert Classic, he decided to attempt it and shot a round of 75; a better score than 30 golfers who played at normal pace. Söderberg played in 96 minutes, beating the previous record of 119 minutes set by Thomas Pieters.

In 2021, Söderberg finished tied second in two tournaments in Spain back to back. He was joint runner-up with Min Woo Lee at the 2021 Estrella Damm N.A. Andalucía Masters, three strokes behind Matt Fitzpatrick. The following week he finished one stroke behind Jeff Winther at the Mallorca Golf Open. He ended the season 61st in the Race to Dubai.

Söderberg again came close to adding a second European Tour title at the 2022 British Masters at The Belfry. He entered the final round six strokes off the lead but emerged from the chasing pack to set the clubhouse target at nine under. However, Thorbjørn Olesen of Denmark produced an eagle-birdie finish to deny him a second title, and ultimately finished solo second.

In 2022, Söderberg received Elit Sign number 149 by the Swedish Golf Federation based on world ranking achievements.

In 2024, Söderberg held a three-shot lead after 36 holes at the Volvo China Open, which was shortened to 54 holes due to inclement weather. He was tied for the lead on the final hole, but made double bogey to finish tied-third, two strokes behind Adrián Otaegui. The following month, Söderberg held an eight-shot lead after 54 holes at the Volvo Car Scandinavian Mixed. He shot 77 in the final round, including a double bogey on the 18th hole, to finish runner-up, one stroke behind Linn Grant.

In 2026, Söderberg shared the lead with Eugenio Chacarra ahead of the final round of the KLM Open, ultimately finishing tied 3rd.

== Amateur wins ==
- 2008 Carin Koch Junior Open (Gullbringa G&CC, Sweden)
- 2009 Chalmers Junior Open (Chalmers GC, Sweden), Carl Pettersson Hovås Junior Open (Göteborg GC, Sweden)
- 2010 Carl Pettersson Hovås Junior Open (Göteborg GC, Sweden)
- 2012 Furman Intercollegiate
- 2013 Insperity ASU Invitational

== Professional wins (6) ==
=== European Tour wins (1) ===
No.	Date	Tournament	Winning score	Margin of victory	Runners-up
1	1 Sep 2019	Omega European Masters	−14 (64-70-66-66=266)	Playoff	(Italy) Lorenzo Gagli, (Northern Ireland) Rory McIlroy, (Argentina) Andrés Romero, (Finland) Kalle Samooja

European Tour playoff record (1–0)

No.	Year	Tournament	Opponents	Result
1	2019	Omega European Masters	(Italy) Lorenzo Gagli, (Northern Ireland) Rory McIlroy, (Argentina) Andrés Romero, (Finland) Kalle Samooja	Won with birdie on first extra hole

=== Challenge Tour wins (2) ===
No.	Date	Tournament	Winning score	Margin of victory	Runner-up
1	20 Mar 2016	Barclays Kenya Open	−18 (67-68-68-67=270)	3 strokes	(France) Romain Langasque
2	15 Jul 2018	Italian Challenge	−17 (64-67-71-65=267)	1 stroke	(Norway) Eirik Tage Johansen

=== Nordic Golf League wins (3) ===
No.	Date	Tournament	Winning score	Margin of victory	Runner-up
1	6 Sep 2013	Willis Masters	−11 (69-69-67=205)	Playoff	(Sweden) Oskar Henningsson
2	20 Sep 2013	Actona PGA Championship	−9 (64-67-70=201)	Playoff	(Denmark) Daniel Løkke
3	26 Feb 2018	Lumine Lakes Open	−16 (68-64-66=198)	4 strokes	(Denmark) Mark Haastrup

== Results in major championships ==
Results not in chronological order in 2020.

Tournament	2016	2017	2018
Masters Tournament			
U.S. Open	CUT		
The Open Championship			
PGA Championship			

Tournament	2019	2020	2021	2022	2023	2024	2025
Masters Tournament							
PGA Championship						T68	
U.S. Open				T53			
The Open Championship		NT					70

Did not play

CUT = missed the halfway cut
"T" = tied
NT = no tournament due to the COVID-19 pandemic

== Results in World Golf Championships ==
Tournament	2020
Championship	
Match Play	NT^{1}
Invitational	77
Champions	NT^{1}

^{1}Cancelled due to COVID-19 pandemic

Did not play

NT = No tournament

== Team appearances ==
Amateur

- European Boys' Team Championship (representing Sweden): 2008 (winners)
- European Amateur Team Championship (representing Sweden): 2011, 2013

== See also ==
- 2016 European Tour Qualifying School graduates
- 2018 Challenge Tour graduates
