= Romain Langasque =

French professional golfer (born 1995)

Personal information
- Nationality: France
- Born: 18 May 1995 (age 31) Grasse, France
- Height: 1.77 m (5 ft 10 in)
- Weight: 75 kg (165 lb; 11.8 st)

Career
- Sport: Golf
- Turned professional: 2016
- Current tour: European Tour
- Former tour: Challenge Tour
- Professional wins: 3
- Highest ranking: 76 (15 December 2024) (as of 25 October 2026)

Number of wins by tour
- European Tour: 1
- Challenge Tour: 1
- Other: 1

Best results in major championships
- Masters Tournament: T39: 2016
- PGA Championship: DNP
- U.S. Open: T34: 2020
- The Open Championship: T33: 2023

Romain Langasque (born 18 May 1995) is a French professional golfer who plays on the European Tour. He won The Amateur Championship in 2015 and in 2020 had his biggest professional success when he won the ISPS Handa Wales Open.

== Amateur career ==
Langasque won The Amateur Championship in 2015 at Carnoustie Golf Links, beating Grant Forrest 4 and 2 in the final.

His Amateur Championship win gave an entry to the 2015 Open Championship where he made the cut and finished tied for 65th place. He also got an entry to the 2016 Masters Tournament where he was one of two amateurs to make the cut and finished tied for 39th place.

== Professional career ==
Langasque turned professional after the 2016 Masters Tournament, thus forfeiting his exemption into the 2016 U.S. Open.

Langasque played on the Challenge Tour in 2016, where he was runner-up in the Barclays Kenya Open, the D+D Real Slovakia Challenge and the Vierumäki Finnish Challenge. He finished ninth in the Road to Oman, the order of merit, to gain entry to the European Tour for 2017.

Langasque started the 2017 European Tour season by finishing tied for tenth place in the Australian PGA Championship. This was his only top-10 finish of the season and he finished 151st in the Race to Dubai, losing his European Tour place.

In December 2017 he finished tied third at the AfrAsia Bank Mauritius Open, where he had been invited. He then missed the cut in 5 of the 6 other European Tour events he was able to play, the last of them being the HNA Open de France in July 2018. Back on the 2018 Challenge Tour, he had a difficult start, earning less than €6,000 until mid-July. From the Le Vaudreuil Golf Challenge he started playing more solidly, making eight cuts in a row, including a tied fifth place at the Kazakhstan Open in September and his first professional victory a week later at the Hopps Open de Provence. Despite a fourth-place finish in the Ras Al Khaimah Challenge Tour Grand Final, he finished 19th in the Road to Ras Al Khaimah rankings, missing out on a European Tour place. However, less than two weeks later he finished in fifth place in the European Tour Q-School to earn a place on the European Tour for 2019.

Langasque had a successful start to the 2019 European Tour season, finishing second in the South African Open in December 2018. The event was part of the Open Qualifying Series and his high finish gave him an entry to the 2019 Open Championship, his first major as a professional. He had solo third-place finishes in the Made in Denmark tournament and the Scottish Open and finished the 2019 season 24th in the Order of Merit.

On 23 August 2020, Langasque won the ISPS Handa Wales Open by two shots over Sami Välimäki. He shot a final round 65 to overturn a five-shot deficit for his first European Tour win and advanced to 100th on the Official World Golf Ranking, tying his career best ranking from July 2019.

On 29 September 2022, in the first round of the Alfred Dunhill Links Championship, Langasque tied the course record at the Old Course in St Andrews, Scotland, with score of 11-under-par 61.

== Amateur wins ==
- 2011 Tournoi Federal Jeunes
- 2013 Grand Prix de la Ligue Messieurs
- 2014 Grand Prix de Bordeaux, Trophee des Regions
- 2015 Southern Cross Invitational, Coupe Frayssineau Mouchy, The Amateur Championship
- 2016 Spanish International Amateur Championship

== Professional wins (3) ==
=== European Tour wins (1) ===
No.	Date	Tournament	Winning score	Margin of victory	Runner-up
1	23 Aug 2020	ISPS Handa Wales Open	−8 (71-68-72-65=276)	2 strokes	(Finland) Sami Välimäki

=== Challenge Tour wins (1) ===
No.	Date	Tournament	Winning score	Margin of victory	Runners-up
1	23 Sep 2018	Hopps Open de Provence	−15 (66-69-71-67=273)	3 strokes	(Switzerland) Joel Girrbach, (Sweden) Joel Sjöholm

Challenge Tour playoff record (0–1)

No.	Year	Tournament	Opponent	Result
1	2016	D+D Real Slovakia Challenge	(Norway) Espen Kofstad	Lost to birdie on second extra hole

=== French Tour wins (1) ===
No.	Date	Tournament	Winning score	Margin of victory	Runners-up
1	24 Nov 2018	Internationaux de France Professionels de Double (with Antoine Schwartz)	−20 (63-70-63=196)	1 stroke	(France) Alexandre Daydou and (France) Julien Forêt

== Results in major championships ==
Results not in chronological order in 2020.

Tournament	2015	2016	2017	2018
Masters Tournament		T39		
U.S. Open				
The Open Championship	T65			
PGA Championship				

Tournament	2019	2020	2021	2022	2023	2024	2025
Masters Tournament							
PGA Championship							
U.S. Open		T34			T54		
The Open Championship	T63	NT	CUT		T33	WD	T61

Did not play

CUT = missed the half-way cut
WD = withdrew
"T" = tied
NT = no tournament due to COVID-19 pandemic

== Results in World Golf Championships ==
Tournament	2019
Championship	
Match Play	
Invitational	
Champions	T46

Did not play

"T" = Tied

== Team appearances ==
Amateur

- Jacques Léglise Trophy (representing Continental Europe) : 2012 (winners), 2013
- European Boys' Team Championship (representing France) : 2011, 2012, 2013 (winners)
- European Amateur Team Championship (representing France) : 2015

Professional

- World Cup (representing France): 2016
- Team Cup (representing Continental Europe): 2025

== See also ==
- 2016 Challenge Tour graduates
- 2018 European Tour Qualifying School graduates
