= Lauri Ruuska =

Finnish professional golfer (born 1993)

Personal information
- Nationality: Finland
- Born: 28 December 1993 (age 32) Äänekoski, Finland
- Height: 191 cm (6 ft 3 in)

Career
- Sport: Golf
- Turned professional: 2016
- Current tour: MENA Golf Tour
- Former tours: European Tour; Challenge Tour; Nordic Golf League; Finnish Tour
- Professional wins: 10

Number of wins by tour
- Challenge Tour: 1
- Other: 9

Achievements and awards
- Finnish Tour Order of Merit winner: 2013

Lauri Ruuska (born 28 December 1993) is a Finnish professional golfer and European Tour player. He shot a 59 to win the 2023 Vierumäki Finnish Challenge.

== Amateur career ==
Ruuska won the 2013 Finnish Matchplay Championship, SM Reikäpeli, as a teenager, and topped the Finnish Tour Order of Merit. In 2015, he won the Finnish Stroke Play Championship, was runner-up at the Finnish Amateur Championship, and tied for 4th at the Nordea Tour Winter Series Lakes Open in Spain, a Nordic Golf League event. He made the cut at the 2015 GANT Open, a Challenge Tour event.

== Professional career ==
Ruuska turned professional ahead of the 2016 season and joined the Nordic Golf League, where he won his first title in 2017.

In 2020, he was runner-up at the PGA Catalunya Resort Championship, Thisted Forsikring Championship and Ledreborg Masters to finish 4th in the Order of Merit and join the 2021 Challenge Tour.

On the Challenge Tour, he won his first title at the 2023 Vierumäki Finnish Challenge, where he shot a bogey-free 59, becoming the fourth player in Challenge Tour history and the first Finn to card a sub-60 round.

| Hole | 1 | 2 | 3 | 4 | 5 | 6 | 7 | 8 | 9 | Front | 10 | 11 | 12 | 13 | 14 | 15 | 16 | 17 | 18 | Back | Total |
|---|---|---|---|---|---|---|---|---|---|---|---|---|---|---|---|---|---|---|---|---|---|
| Par | 5 | 4 | 4 | 3 | 4 | 4 | 3 | 4 | 4 | 35 | 4 | 4 | 5 | 4 | 4 | 3 | 4 | 3 | 5 | 36 | 71 |
| Shots | 3 | 3 | 4 | 3 | 4 | 3 | 2 | 3 | 4 | 29 | 3 | 3 | 4 | 3 | 4 | 3 | 4 | 2 | 4 | 30 | 59 |
| To par | −2 | −3 | −3 | −3 | −3 | −4 | −5 | −6 | −6 | −6 | −7 | −8 | −9 | −10 | −10 | −10 | −10 | −11 | −12 | −6 | −12 |

Ruuska was successful at Q-School and joined the 2024 European Tour, where his best finish his rookie season was a tie for 10th at the Italian Open.

In 2026, he joined the MENA Golf Tour where he won the Egypt Golf Series event at New Giza Golf Club after a final round ten-under-par 62.

== Amateur wins ==
- 2015 Finnish Stroke Play Championship

== Professional wins (10) ==
=== Challenge Tour (1) ===
| No. | Date | Tournament | Winning score | Margin of victory | Runners-up |
|---|---|---|---|---|---|
| 1 | 20 Aug 2023 | Vierumäki Finnish Challenge | −27 (59-70-64-64=257) | 7 strokes | (Scotland) Jack McDonald, (Sweden) Joakim Wikström |

=== MENA Golf Tour wins (1) ===
| No. | Date | Tournament | Winning score | Margin of victory | Runner-up |
|---|---|---|---|---|---|
| 1 | 21 Jan 2026 | Egypt Golf Series New Giza Golf Club | −14 (70-70-62=202) | 1 stroke | (England) Charlie Crockett |

=== Nordic Golf League wins (2) ===
| No. | Date | Tournament | Winning score | Margin of victory | Runner(s)-up |
|---|---|---|---|---|---|
| 1 | 30 Sep 2017 | GolfUppsala Open | −14 (65-68-71=204) | 1 stroke | (Sweden) Rasmus Holmberg, (Sweden) Erik Oja |
| 2 | 6 Mar 2026 | Infinitum Spring Series Final | −14 (64-62-71=197) | 3 strokes | (Denmark) August Thor Høst |

=== Finnish Tour wins (6) ===
| No. | Date | Tournament | Winning score | Margin of victory | Runner(s)-up |
|---|---|---|---|---|---|
| 1 | 22 Aug 2013 | SM Reikäpeli (as an amateur) | 4 and 3 | | (Finland) Henri Lipsanen |
| 2 | 6 May 2017 | Finnish Tour Opening | −5 (69-70-72=211) | 3 strokes | (Finland) Jaakko Mäkitalo |
| 3 | 10 Jun 2017 | Finnish Tour 3 | −9 (67-72-68=207) | 4 strokes | (Finland) Peter Erofejeff, (Finland) Rasmus Karlsson (a) |
| 4 | 5 May 2019 | Finnish Tour Opening | −3 (72-73-68=213) | Playoff | (Finland) Sami Välimäki |
| 5 | 29 May 2022 | Kuljetusrinki Open | −16 (67-66-64=197) | 2 strokes | (Finland) Rasmus Karlsson |
| 6 | 8 Jul 2023 | EEZY Open | −14 (71-65-66=202) | 1 stroke | (Finland) Niclas Hellberg |

== Team appearances ==
Amateur

- European Nations Cup – Copa Sotogrande (representing Finland): 2014
- European Amateur Team Championship (representing Finland): 2013, 2014, 2015

== See also ==
- 2023 European Tour Qualifying School graduates
- Lowest rounds of golf
