= Dominic Foos =

German professional golfer (born 1997)

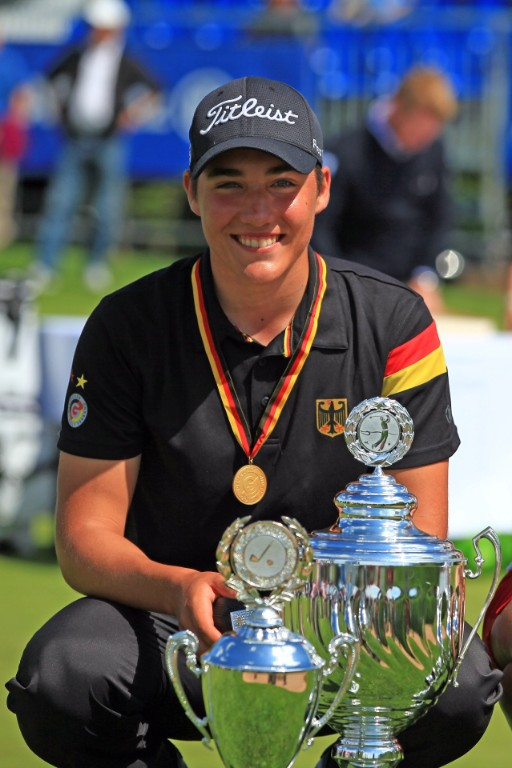

Personal information
- Nationality: Germany
- Born: 3 September 1997 (age 29) Karlsruhe, Germany
- Height: 1.77 m (5 ft 10 in)
- Weight: 71 kg (157 lb; 11.2 st)

Career
- Sport: Golf
- Turned professional: 2014
- Current tour: Asian Tour
- Former tour: Challenge Tour
- Professional wins: 3

Number of wins by tour
- Asian Tour: 1
- Challenge Tour: 2

Dominic Foos (born 3 September 1997) is a German professional golfer.

== Career ==
After winning several junior amateur tournaments in Germany and internationally, Foos turned professional in 2014.

Foos played on the Challenge Tour in 2015 and won the Gant Open in August at the age of 17 years, 347 days – making him the youngest winner in Challenge Tour history.

In October 2025, Foos won the SJM Macao Open on the Asian Tour, his first professional victory in over 10 years. It was also the first victory on the Asian Tour by a German since Bernhard Langer in 1996.

== Amateur wins ==
- 2011 Florida International Junior
- 2012 German Match Play, German Boys Open, German National Boys Championship
- 2013 French International Boys Championship, German Boys Open

== Professional wins (3) ==
=== Asian Tour wins (1) ===
No.	Date	Tournament	Winning score	Margin of victory	Runner-up
1	19 Oct 2025	SJM Macao Open	−17 (64-68-68-63=263)	Playoff	(Taiwan) Wang Wei-hsuan

Asian Tour playoff record (1–0)

No.	Year	Tournament	Opponent	Result
1	2025	SJM Macao Open	(Taiwan) Wang Wei-hsuan	Won with birdie on second extra hole

=== Challenge Tour wins (2) ===
No.	Date	Tournament	Winning score	Margin of victory	Runner(s)-up
1	16 Aug 2015	Gant Open	−14 (65-69-69-67=270)	3 strokes	(Spain) José Manuel Lara, (Scotland) Jamie McLeary, (Germany) Marcel Schneider, (South Africa) Brandon Stone
2	23 Aug 2026	Vierumäki Finnish Challenge (2)	−21 (69-63-68-67=267)	1 stroke	(Denmark) Jonathan Gøth-Rasmussen

== Team appearances ==
Amateur

- Jacques Léglise Trophy (representing Continental Europe): 2012 (winners), 2013
- Junior Ryder Cup (representing Europe): 2012
- European Amateur Team Championship (representing Germany): 2013
- Bonallack Trophy (representing Europe): 2014 (winners)
