= Victor Perez (golfer) =

French professional golfer (born 1992)

Personal information
- Nationality: France
- Born: 2 September 1992 (age 34) Séméac, Hautes-Pyrénées, France
- Height: 1.98 m (6 ft 6 in)
- Life partner: Abigail Gliksten

Career
- Sport: Golf
- College: University of New Mexico
- Turned professional: 2015
- Current tours: European Tour; LIV Golf
- Former tours: PGA Tour; Challenge Tour; Alps Tour
- Professional wins: 7
- Highest ranking: 29 (4 April 2021) (as of 25 October 2026)

Number of wins by tour
- European Tour: 3
- Challenge Tour: 2
- Other: 2

Best results in major championships
- Masters Tournament: T46: 2020
- PGA Championship: T12: 2023
- U.S. Open: T19: 2025
- The Open Championship: T28: 2026

Victor Perez (born 2 September 1992) is a French professional golfer who plays on LIV Golf. He won the 2019 Alfred Dunhill Links Championship on the European Tour, as well as the 2023 Abu Dhabi HSBC Championship.

== Amateur career ==
Perez attended the University of New Mexico from 2011 to 2015. He represented France in the 2014 Eisenhower Trophy, where he was the joint-second lowest individual scorer behind Jon Rahm.

== Professional career ==
Perez finished second in the Alps Tour qualifying school in December 2015 to earn a place on the tour for 2016. He was runner-up in the Open Frassanelle and won the Alps de Las Castillas, finishing the season fifth in the Order of Merit to earn a place on the 2017 Challenge Tour.

In his first season on the Challenge Tour, Perez finished 18th in the Order of Merit, just outside the top-15 that gained cards for the European Tour. He was runner-up in the Made in Denmark Challenge and won the Challenge de España.

In his second season on the Challenge Tour, Perez finished 3rd in the Order of Merit which obtained him a place on the 2019 European Tour. He ended the 2018 season by winning the Foshan Open after a playoff with Robert MacIntyre, and then finishing second behind Adri Arnaus in the Ras Al Khaimah Challenge Tour Grand Final. He also earned his first European Tour top 10 by finishing 6th in the Belgian Knockout in May.

Perez made a good start to the 2019 European Tour, finishing joint 3rd in the first event of the season, the Honma Hong Kong Open, played in November 2018. In September 2019, Perez earned his first European Tour victory by winning the Alfred Dunhill Links Championship. He tied for 4th place in the 2019 WGC-HSBC Champions and the following week was joint runner-up in the Turkish Airlines Open after a six-man playoff. Perez finished the European Tour season 13th on the Race to Dubai and ended 2019 at 45th in the Official World Golf Ranking to qualify for the 2020 Masters Tournament, his first major championship.

In January 2020, Perez finished tied-for-second at the Abu Dhabi HSBC Championship. He finished runner-up again in October 2020, at the BMW PGA Championship.

In May 2022, Perez won the Dutch Open in a playoff over Ryan Fox. He holed two long-range putts on the third and fourth playoff holes to extend and eventually win the playoff. It was his second European Tour victory.

In January 2023, Perez won the Abu Dhabi HSBC Championship. He shot a final-round 66 to win by one shot ahead of Min Woo Lee and Sebastian Söderberg.

In November 2025, Perez signed with LIV Golf, joining Cleeks GC. As a result he also resigned his PGA Tour membership.

== Personal life ==
Perez was born in Séméac in southwestern France, and he studied psychology at the University of New Mexico. He is of Spanish descent through his paternal great-grandparents.

In 2017, Perez moved from France to Dundee, Scotland and then to Edinburgh in 2023.

== Amateur wins ==
- 2010 Grand Prix du Medoc
- 2012 Aggie Invitational, Grand Prix des Landes-Hossegor
- 2013 Grand Prix de Chiberta

== Professional wins (7) ==
=== European Tour wins (3) ===
Legend
Rolex Series (1)
Other European Tour (2)

No.	Date	Tournament	Winning score	Margin of victory	Runner(s)-up
1	29 Sep 2019	Alfred Dunhill Links Championship	−22 (64-68-64-70=266)	1 stroke	(England) Matthew Southgate
2	29 May 2022	Dutch Open	−13 (67-70-69-69=275)	Playoff	(New Zealand) Ryan Fox
3	22 Jan 2023	Abu Dhabi HSBC Championship	−18 (71-65-68-66=270)	1 stroke	(Australia) Min Woo Lee, (Sweden) Sebastian Söderberg

European Tour playoff record (1–1)

No.	Year	Tournament	Opponent(s)	Result
1	2019	Turkish Airlines Open	(England) Tyrrell Hatton, (France) Benjamin Hébert, (United States) Kurt Kitayama, (Austria) Matthias Schwab, (South Africa) Erik van Rooyen	Hatton won with par on fourth extra hole Kitayama eliminated by birdie on third hole Hébert, Perez and van Rooyen eliminated by birdie on first hole
2	2022	Dutch Open	(New Zealand) Ryan Fox	Won with birdie on fourth extra hole

=== Challenge Tour wins (2) ===
No.	Date	Tournament	Winning score	Margin of victory	Runner-up
1	1 Oct 2017	Challenge de España	−24 (67-71-61-65=264)	3 strokes	(Norway) Jarand Ekeland Arnøy
2	21 Oct 2018	Foshan Open^{1}	−19 (68-65-67-69=269)	Playoff	(Scotland) Robert MacIntyre

^{1}Co-sanctioned by the China Tour

Challenge Tour playoff record (1–0)

No.	Year	Tournament	Opponent	Result
1	2018	Foshan Open	(Scotland) Robert MacIntyre	Won with birdie on first extra hole

=== Alps Tour wins (1) ===
No.	Date	Tournament	Winning score	Margin of victory	Runners-up
1	23 Jul 2016	Alps de Las Castillas	−15 (66-67-68=201)	2 strokes	(Spain) Daniel Berna, (France) Fabien Marty

=== French Tour wins (1) ===
No.	Date	Tournament	Winning score	Margin of victory	Runner-up
1	7 Apr 2017	Open de Mont de Marsan	−13 (68-66-66=200)	2 strokes	(France) Robin Roussel

== Results in major championships ==
Results not in chronological order in 2020.

Tournament	2020	2021	2022	2023	2024	2025	2026
Masters Tournament	T46	CUT					
PGA Championship	T22	CUT		T12	CUT	CUT	
U.S. Open	CUT	CUT	CUT	CUT	CUT	T19	
The Open Championship	NT	CUT	T34	T41	CUT		T28

Did not play

CUT = missed the half-way cut
"T" = tied
NT = no tournament due to COVID-19 pandemic

=== Summary ===
Tournament	Wins	2nd	3rd	Top-5	Top-10	Top-25	Events	Cuts made
Masters Tournament	0	0	0	0	0	0	2	1
PGA Championship	0	0	0	0	0	2	5	2
U.S. Open	0	0	0	0	0	1	6	1
The Open Championship	0	0	0	0	0	0	5	3
Totals	0	0	0	0	0	3	18	7

- Most consecutive cuts made – 2 (twice, current)

== Results in The Players Championship ==
Tournament	2021
The Players Championship	T9

Top 10

"T" indicates a tie for a place

== Results in World Golf Championships ==
Tournament	2019	2020	2021	2022	2023
Championship		T53	T52		
Match Play		NT^{1}	4		T31
Invitational		T65	61		
Champions	T4	NT^{1}	NT^{1}	NT^{1}	

^{1}Cancelled due to COVID-19 pandemic

Top 10
Did not play

NT = No tournament
"T" = Tied
Note that the Championship and Invitational were discontinued from 2022. The Champions was discontinued from 2023.

== Team appearances ==
Amateur

- Eisenhower Trophy (representing France): 2014

Professional

- Hero Cup (representing Continental Europe): 2023 (winners)

== See also ==
- 2018 Challenge Tour graduates
- 2023 Race to Dubai dual card winners
