= 2023 Race to Dubai dual card winners =

This is a list of the 10 European Tour (DP World Tour) players who earned PGA Tour card for the 2024 season via the 2023 Race to Dubai. As part of the PGA Tour strategic alliance expansion which had been signed in June 2022, the 2023 season saw the introduction of this initiative.

The top 10 players on the Race to Dubai (not otherwise exempt) earned status to play on the 2024 PGA Tour. They were as follows:

			2023 European Tour		2024 PGA Tour				
Rank	Cty	Player	R2D pos.	Points	Starts	Cuts made	Best finish	FedEx Cup rank	Prize money ($)
1	(Poland)	Adrian Meronk (Note: PGA Tour rookie in 2024)	4	2,969	n/a (Note: Meronk became ineligible for the 2024 PGA Tour season, having joined LIV Golf in January 2024.)				
2	(New Zealand)	Ryan Fox (Note: First-time PGA Tour member in 2024, but ineligible for rookie status due to having played eight or more PGA Tour events in a previous season(s))	5	2,898	24	17	T4	118	1,378,822
3	(France)	Victor Perez	7	2,406	22	15	3/T3	83	2,068,163
4	(Denmark)	Thorbjørn Olesen (Note: Olesen retained his PGA Tour card for 2025 by finishing 13th (7th not otherwise exempt) on the 2024 Race to Dubai.)	9	2,226	16	10	T14	170	500,887
5	(Sweden)	Alexander Björk	11	2,141	16	8	T11	179	414,659
6	(Finland)	Sami Välimäki	12	2,113	22	9	2	123	1,273,129
7	(Scotland)	Robert MacIntyre	13	2,094	25	15	Win (x2)	T17	5,400,384
8	(France)	Matthieu Pavon	15	2,052	19	15	Win	T17	5,254,412
9	(Spain)	Jorge Campillo	16	2,008	17	11	T4	154	605,997
10	(Japan)	Ryo Hisatsune	17	1,964	27	17	T3	93	1,637,598

T = Tied
Player retained his PGA Tour card for 2025 (finished inside the top 125)
Player did not retain his PGA Tour card for 2025 (finished outside the top 150)

== 2024 PGA Tour winners ==
No.	Date	Player	Tournament	Winning score	Margin of victory	Runner-up	Prize money ($)
1	27 Jan	(France) Matthieu Pavon	Farmers Insurance Open	−13 (69-65-72-69=275)	1 stroke	(Denmark) Nicolai Højgaard	1,620,000
2	2 Jun	(Scotland) Robert MacIntyre	RBC Canadian Open	−16 (64-66-66-68=264)	1 stroke	(United States) Ben Griffin	1,692,000
3	14 Jul	(Scotland) Robert MacIntyre (2)	Genesis Scottish Open	−18 (67-65-63-67=262)	1 stroke	(Australia) Adam Scott	1,575,000

== 2024 PGA Tour runner-up finishes ==
No.	Date	Player	Tournament	Winner	Winning score	Runner-up score	Prize money ($)
1	25 Feb	(Finland) Sami Välimäki	Mexico Open	(United States) Jake Knapp	−19 (67-64-63-71=265)	−17 (64-67-67-69=267)	882,900

== See also ==
- 2023 Korn Ferry Tour graduates
- 2023 PGA Tour Qualifying School graduates
