= Finnish Tour =

Professional golf tour

- Formerly: Audi Finnish Tour
- Sport: Golf
- Founded: 2002
- Founder: Finnish Golf Association; PGA of Finland
- First season: 2002
- Countries: Based in Finland (Note: Schedules have also included events in Estonia and Latvia.)
- Most titles: Order of Merit titles: (Finland) Joonas Granberg (3); Tournament wins: (Finland) Joonas Granberg (9) (Note: Includes two tournaments which were incorporated into Nordic Golf League schedules.) (Finland) Kalle Samooja (9) (Note: Includes one tournament which was incorporated into Nordic Golf League schedules.)
- Related competitions: Danish Golf Tour; Nordic Golf League; Norwegian Golf Tour; Swedish Golf Tour
- Website: https://finnishtour.fi/

The Finnish Tour is a developmental professional golf tour based in Finland. In the past, similar to the Danish Golf Tour and the Swedish Golf Tour, most events on the Finnish Tour schedules were incorporated into the Nordic Golf League, one of the four third-tier tours recognized by the European Tour. However, most tournaments are now independent Finnish Tour events.

Many players from the Finnish Tour have progressed through the tour, eventually playing and winning on the European Tour. Notable players include Mikko Korhonen, Kalle Samooja and Sami Välimäki.

== History ==
The tour was founded in 2002 by the Finnish Golf Association and the PGA of Finland. The tour aims to offer Finland's best players (both male and female) the opportunity to compete against each other at a high level.

In 2014, the tour signed a title-sponsor agreement with German car manufacturer Audi, becoming the Audi Finnish Tour. The deal finished in 2016.

== Order of Merit winners ==
Year	Winner	Points
2026	(Finland) Saku Ellilä (a)	625
2025	(Finland) Oskari Nikku	475
2024	(Finland) Roope Kakko	490
2023	(Finland) Rasmus Karlsson	647
2022	(Finland) Jaapo Jämsä (a)	409
2021	(Finland) Casper Simberg	472
2020	(Finland) Matias Honkala	676
2019	(Finland) Sami Välimäki	420
2018	(Finland) Jaakko Mäkitalo (2)	500
2017	(Finland) Mikael Salminen	861
2016	(Finland) Tuomas Salminen (2)	553
2015	(Finland) Tuomas Salminen	512
2014	(Finland) Henri Satama	610
2013	(Finland) Lauri Ruuska	551
2012	(Finland) Kalle Samooja (2)	506
2011	(Finland) Joonas Granberg (3)	848
2010	(Finland) Joonas Granberg (2)	546
2009	(Finland) Thomas Sundström	724
2008	(Finland) Kalle Samooja (a)	349
2007	(Finland) Joonas Granberg	520
2006	(Finland) Casimir Collin	386
2005	(Finland) Ari Savolainen	500
2004	(Finland) Jaakko Mäkitalo	496
2003	(Finland) Jarkko Soikkeli	530
2002	(Finland) Toni Karjalainen	854

== See also ==
- Danish Golf Tour
- Nordic Golf League
- Norwegian Golf Tour
- Swedish Golf Tour
