= Mikael Piltz =

Finnish professional golfer

Personal information
- Nationality: Finland
- Born: 10 May 1967 (age 59)
- Height: 1.86 m (6 ft 1 in)

Career
- Sport: Golf
- Turned professional: 1989
- Former tours: European Tour; Challenge Tour
- Professional wins: 9

Number of wins by tour
- Challenge Tour: 2
- Other: 7

Mikael Piltz (born 10 May 1967) is a Finnish professional golfer who played on the Challenge Tour and briefly on the European Tour.

== Career ==
Piltz turned professional in 1989 and played on the Swedish Golf Tour. He then joined the Challenge Tour, where he was runner-up at the 1992 Volvo Finnish Open before winning the 1994 Volvo Finnish Open, following a playoff with Joakim Grönhagen. The win earned him an invitation to the 1995 Sarazen World Open at Chateau Elan Legends course in Braselton, Georgia. He made 11 starts and 5 cuts on the 1994 European Tour, finding himself back on the Challenge Tour, where he was runner-up at the 2001 Russian Open behind Jamie Donaldson.

Piltz represented Finland at four World Cups (1991, 1992, 1994, 2000) with a best finish of 21st together with Kalle Väinölä in 2000.

== Professional wins (9) ==
=== Challenge Tour wins (1) ===
No.	Date	Tournament	Winning score	Margin of victory	Runner-up
1	10 Jul 1994	Volvo Finnish Open	−6 (67-71-72=210)	Playoff	(Sweden) Joakim Grönhagen

Challenge Tour playoff record (1–0)

No.	Year	Tournament	Opponent	Result
1	1994	Volvo Finnish Open	(Sweden) Joakim Grönhagen	Won with birdie on second extra hole

=== Nordic Golf League wins (6) ===
No.	Date	Tournament	Winning score	Margin of victory	Runner(s)-up
1	6 Jun 1999	Kiitolinja Open	−8 (69-67=136)	3 strokes	(Sweden) Johan Edfors
2	20 Jun 1999	Canon Masters	−9 (66-70-71=207)	3 strokes	(Finland) Pauli Hughes, (Finland) Mika Lehtinen, (Finland) Kalle Väinölä
3	25 Jul 1999	Audi Trophy			(Finland) Jyry-Jussi Peltomäki
4	12 Sep 1999	Finnish PGA Championship	+1 (71-75-71=217)	5 strokes	(Finland) Anssi Kankkonen
5	17 Jun 2000	Sonera-Kiitolinja Open	−5 (69-70-72=211)	1 stroke	(Finland) Kalle Väinölä
6	26 May 2002	Intersport Open	−11 (67-71-67=205)	5 strokes	(Finland) Toni Karjalainen

=== Other wins (2) ===
- 1995 Finnish PGA Championship
- 1997 Finish Closed Championship

== Team appearances ==
Amateur

- European Boys' Team Championship (representing Finland): 1985

Professional

- World Cup (representing Finland): 1991, 1992, 1994, 2000
