= Sami Välimäki =

Finnish professional golfer (born 1998

Personal information
- Nationality: Finland
- Born: 16 July 1998 (age 28) Nokia, Finland
- Height: 6 ft 2 in (188 cm)
- Weight: 233 lb (106 kg)

Career
- Sport: Golf
- Turned professional: 2019
- Current tours: PGA Tour; European Tour
- Former tours: Pro Golf Tour; Finnish Tour
- Professional wins: 9
- Highest ranking: 38 (21 December 2025) (as of 25 October 2026)

Number of wins by tour
- PGA Tour: 1
- European Tour: 2
- Other: 6

Best results in major championships
- Masters Tournament: CUT: 2026
- PGA Championship: T60: 2026
- U.S. Open: CUT: 2020
- The Open Championship: T68: 2023

Achievements and awards
- Finnish Tour Order of Merit winner: 2019
- Sir Henry Cotton Rookie of the Year: 2020

Sami Välimäki (born 16 July 1998) is a Finnish professional golfer who plays on the PGA Tour and the European Tour. In his 6th European Tour start, he won the 2020 Oman Open. In 2025, he became the first Finn to win on the PGA Tour when he won the RSM Classic.

== Amateur career ==
During 2018, Välimäki was selected for the Europe team in the Bonallack Trophy and for the Continent of Europe team in the St Andrews Trophy. He played for the Finnish team that won the 2018 European Amateur Team Championship and represented Finland in the 2018 Eisenhower Trophy. He reached as high as 10th in the World Amateur Golf Ranking during 2018. While still an amateur, Välimäki also played a number of Nordic Golf League events during 2017 and 2018.

== Professional career ==
Välimäki turned professional in early 2019 after the completion of his military service in Finland. He played mostly on the Pro Golf Tour during 2019. He won his first professional victory in February at the Open Casa Green Golf in Morocco. He won twice more on the tour in August and also won the end-of-season Castanea Resort Championship for his fourth win of the season. Despite his four wins he only finished second in the Order of Merit.

After his third win on the 2019 Pro Golf Tour, Välimäki earned a place on the Challenge Tour, but later he qualified for the European Tour for 2020 by finishing 8th in qualifying school. In his fifth start of the 2020 season, he won the Oman Open, beating Brandon Stone in a playoff.

In October 2023, Välimäki claimed his second European Tour win at the Commercial Bank Qatar Masters, beating Jorge Campillo in a playoff.

In 2024, Välimäki joined the PGA Tour, where he was runner-up at the Mexico Open in his 5th start.

In 2025, Välimäki achieved 5 PGA Tour]top 20 finishes in the first half of the year, and in November he secured his card for 2026 when he finished runner-up at the 2025 World Wide Technology Championship in Mexico. He was also runner-up at the 2025 Omega European Masters in Switzerland.

In November 2025, Välimäki became the first Finn to win on the PGA Tour, winning the RSM Classic in Georgia. His winning score was 23 under par, beating Max McGreevy by one shot.

== Personal life ==
Välimäki is a cousin of Finnish NHL player Juuso Välimäki.

== Amateur wins ==
- 2016 Ticino Championship, Finnish Junior Match Play Under-18
- 2017 Portuguese International Amateur Championship, Ticino Championship

== Professional wins (9) ==
=== PGA Tour wins (1) ===
No.	Date	Tournament	Winning score	Margin of victory	Runner-up
1	23 Nov 2025	RSM Classic	−23 (66-62-65-66=259)	1 stroke	(United States) Max McGreevy

=== European Tour wins (2) ===
No.	Date	Tournament	Winning score	Margin of victory	Runner-up
1	1 Mar 2020	Oman Open	−13 (74-67-64-70=275)	Playoff	(South Africa) Brandon Stone
2	29 Oct 2023	Commercial Bank Qatar Masters	−18 (67-67-67-69=270)	Playoff	(Spain) Jorge Campillo

European Tour playoff record (2–0)

No.	Year	Tournament	Opponent	Result
1	2020	Oman Open	(South Africa) Brandon Stone	Won with par on third extra hole
2	2023	Commercial Bank Qatar Masters	(Spain) Jorge Campillo	Won with birdie on first extra hole

=== Pro Golf Tour wins (4) ===
No.	Date	Tournament	Winning score	Margin of victory	Runner-up
1	8 Feb 2019	Open Casa Green Golf	−14 (68-66-67=201)	2 strokes	(Germany) David Heinzinger
2	17 Aug 2019	Starnberg Open	−13 (68-64-68=200)	1 stroke	(Germany) Thomas Rosenmüller
3	24 Aug 2019	EXTEC CzechOne Open	−13 (67-66-67=200)	3 strokes	(Czech Republic) Ondřej Lieser
4	1 Oct 2019	Castanea Resort Championship	−19 (67-63-67=197)	4 strokes	(Czech Republic) Ondřej Lieser

=== Finnish Tour wins (2) ===
No.	Date	Tournament	Winning score	Margin of victory	Runner-up
1	15 Jun 2019	NRG Open	−11 (73-65-67=205)	Playoff	(Finland) Peter Erofejeff
2	20 Jun 2024	SM Reikäpeli	3 and 2		(Finland) Eetu Isometsä

== Results in major championships ==
Results not in chronological order in 2020.

Tournament	2020	2021	2022	2023	2024	2025	2026
Masters Tournament							CUT
PGA Championship		CUT			CUT	CUT	T60
U.S. Open	CUT						
The Open Championship	NT			T68	CUT		CUT

Did not play

CUT = missed the half-way cut
"T" = tied
NT = no tournament due to COVID-19 pandemic

== Results in The Players Championship ==
Tournament	2025	2026
The Players Championship	T69	CUT

CUT = missed the halfway cut
"T" indicates a tie for a place

== Results in World Golf Championships ==
Tournament	2021
Championship	T64
Match Play	
Invitational	
Champions	NT^{1}

^{1}Cancelled due to COVID-19 pandemic

Did not play

"T" = Tied
NT = No tournament

== Team appearances ==
Amateur

- European Boys' Team Championship (representing Finland): 2015, 2016
- European Amateur Team Championship (representing Finland): 2018 (winners)
- Bonallack Trophy (representing Europe): 2018
- St Andrews Trophy (representing the Continent of Europe): 2018 (winners)
- Eisenhower Trophy (representing Finland): 2018

== See also ==
- 2019 European Tour Qualifying School graduates
- 2023 Race to Dubai dual card winners
