= 2018 Challenge Tour =

Golf tour season

2018 Challenge Tour season
- Duration: 22 March 2018 – 3 November 2018
- Number of official events: 28
- Most wins: (Finland) Kim Koivu (3)
- Rankings: (Denmark) Joachim B. Hansen

The 2018 Challenge Tour was the 30th season of the Challenge Tour, the official development tour to the European Tour.

== Schedule ==
The following table lists official events during the 2018 season.

Date	Tournament	Host country	Purse (€)	Winner (Note: The number in brackets after each winner's name is the number of Challenge Tour events they had won up to and including that tournament. This information is only shown for Challenge Tour members. It is rare for someone to accumulate many wins on the Challenge Tour as success at this level usually leads to promotion to the European Tour.)	OWGR points	Other tours (Note: CHN − China Tour.)	Notes
25 Mar	Barclays Kenya Open	Kenya	500,000	(Italy) Lorenzo Gagli (1)	12		
15 Apr	Belt & Road Colorful Yunnan Open	China	US$350,000	(Finland) Kim Koivu (1)	9	CHN	New to Challenge Tour
29 Apr	Turkish Airlines Challenge	Turkey	200,000	(Denmark) Joachim B. Hansen (1)	12		
6 May	Challenge de España	Spain	200,000	(Sweden) Oscar Lengdén (2)	12		
13 May	Open de Portugal	Portugal	200,000	(Australia) Dimitrios Papadatos (1)	12		
20 May	Andalucía Costa del Sol Match Play 9	Spain	200,000	(Scotland) Liam Johnston (1)	12		
27 May	D+D Real Czech Challenge	Czech Republic	185,000	(South Korea) Kim Min-kyu (1)	12		
3 Jun	Swiss Challenge	Switzerland	180,000	(Germany) Marcel Schneider (1)	12		
10 Jun	KPMG Trophy	Belgium	180,000	(Portugal) Pedro Figueiredo (1)	12		
17 Jun	Hauts de France Golf Open	France	180,000	(Wales) Stuart Manley (2)	12		
24 Jun	SSE Scottish Hydro Challenge	Scotland	250,000	(Scotland) David Law (1)	12		
1 Jul	Made in Denmark Challenge	Denmark	180,000	(Denmark) Joachim B. Hansen (2)	12		
8 Jul	Prague Golf Challenge	Czech Republic	185,000	(England) Ben Stow (1)	12		
15 Jul	Italian Challenge	Italy	300,000	(Sweden) Sebastian Söderberg (2)	12		
22 Jul	Le Vaudreuil Golf Challenge	France	210,000	(England) Richard McEvoy (3)	12		
29 Jul	Euram Bank Open	Austria	180,000	(Netherlands) Darius van Driel (1)	12		New tournament
5 Aug	Swedish Challenge	Sweden	200,000	(England) Oliver Wilson (1)	12		
12 Aug	Vierumäki Finnish Challenge	Finland	180,000	(Finland) Kim Koivu (2)	12		
19 Aug	Galgorm Resort & Spa Northern Ireland Open	Northern Ireland	180,000	(Scotland) Calum Hill (1)	12		
25 Aug	Rolex Trophy	Switzerland	250,000	(Finland) Kim Koivu (3) (Note: Koivu earned immediate promotion to the European Tour, as this was his third win of the season.)	12		
2 Sep	Cordon Golf Open	France	230,000	(England) Jack Singh Brar (1)	12		
9 Sep	Bridgestone Challenge	England	180,000	(England) Tom Lewis (1)	12		
16 Sep	Kazakhstan Open	Kazakhstan	450,000	(Scotland) Liam Johnston (2)	13		
23 Sep	Hopps Open de Provence	France	200,000	(France) Romain Langasque (1)	12		New tournament
7 Oct	Monaghan Irish Challenge	Ireland	180,000	(England) Oliver Wilson (2)	12		
14 Oct	Hainan Open	China	US$350,000	(Finland) Kalle Samooja (1)	13	CHN	
21 Oct	Foshan Open	China	US$500,000	(France) Victor Perez (2)	13	CHN	
3 Nov	Ras Al Khaimah Challenge Tour Grand Final	UAE	420,000	(Spain) Adri Arnaus (1)	17		Flagship event

== Rankings ==
The rankings were titled as the Road to Ras Al Khaimah and were based on tournament results during the season, calculated using a points-based system. The top 15 players on the rankings earned status to play on the 2019 European Tour.

Rank	Player	Points
1	(Denmark) Joachim B. Hansen	222,320
2	(Spain) Adri Arnaus	205,836
3	(France) Victor Perez	194,236
4	(Finland) Kalle Samooja	140,243
5	(Sweden) Sebastian Söderberg	140,167
