= Joonas Granberg =

Finnish professional golfer (born 1986)

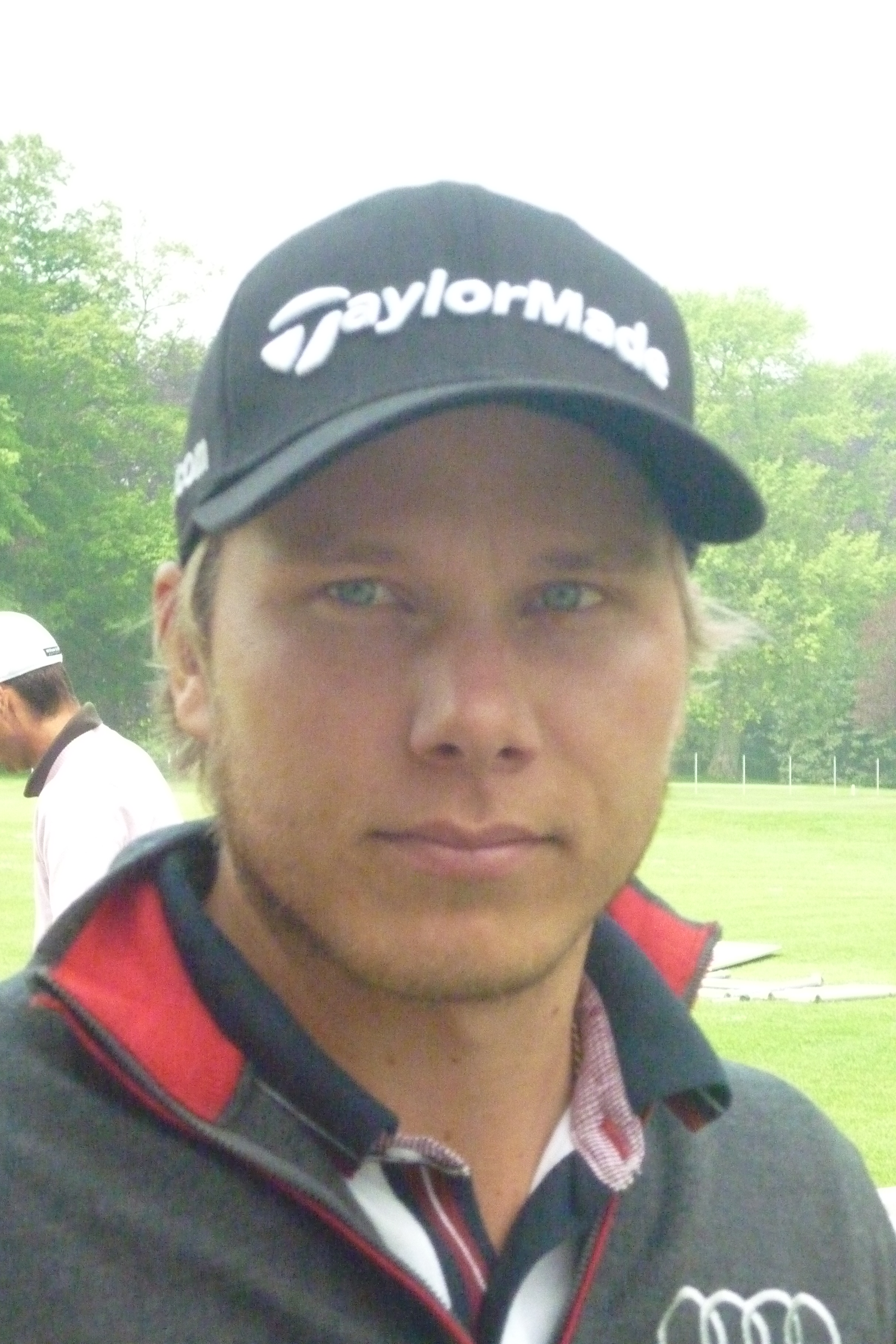

Personal information
- Nationality: Finland
- Born: 30 December 1986 (age 39)

Career
- Sport: Golf
- Turned professional: 2007
- Current tour: Finnish Tour
- Former tours: Asian Tour; Challenge Tour
- Professional wins: 10

Number of wins by tour
- Asian Tour: 1
- Other: 9

Achievements and awards
- Finnish Tour Order of Merit winner: 2007, 2010, 2011

Joonas Granberg (born 30 December 1986) is a Finnish professional golfer.

== Career ==
Granberg played on the Challenge Tour in 2008 and 2009. He played on the Asian Tour in 2011 and won the Worldwide Holdings Selangor Masters.

== Professional wins (10) ==
=== Asian Tour wins (1) ===
No.	Date	Tournament	Winning score	Margin of victory	Runner-up
1	23 Jul 2011	Worldwide Holdings Selangor Masters	−15 (62-75-70-66=273)	1 stroke	(Thailand) Panuphol Pittayarat

=== Nordic Golf League wins (2) ===
No.	Date	Tournament	Winning score	Margin of victory	Runner(s)-up
1	19 Aug 2007	St Laurence Open (as an amateur)	−13 (68-66-69=203)	9 strokes	(Finland) Janne Kaske
2	30 May 2010	Finnish Tour Opening	−1 (70-73-72=215)	2 strokes	(Finland) Joachim Altonen, (Finland) Peter Erofejeff, (Finland) Janne Mommo, (Finland) Thomas Sundström

=== Finnish Tour wins (7) ===
No.	Date	Tournament	Winning score	Margin of victory	Runner(s)-up
1	14 Aug 2005	SM Reikäpeli (as an amateur)	1 up		(Finland) Peter Erofejeff
2	17 Jun 2007	FGT II (as an amateur)	−5 (72-70-69=211)	1 stroke	(Finland) Jonas Haglund, (Finland) Janne Kaske, (Finland) Immu Korvenmaa
3	2 Jul 2011	Finnish Tour Pickala Golf	−8 (70-68-70=208)	Playoff	(Finland) Janne Martikainen
4	10 Sep 2011	Finnish Tour Vuosaari Golf	−9 (67-68-72=207)	1 stroke	(Finland) Ossi Mikkola
5	28 Jun 2013	Audi PGA Finland Championship	−2 (71-70-73=214)	Playoff	(Finland) Riku Mattila, (Finland) Henri Satama
6	7 Jun 2014	Audi Finnish Tour Nordcenter	−1 (72-70-73=215)	1 stroke	(Finland) Kaj-Matias Kujala (a), (Finland) Riku Mattila
7	28 Jun 2019	Audi PGA Finland Championship (2)	−6 (71-69-70=210)	2 strokes	(Finland) Albert Eckhardt

== Team appearances ==
Amateur

- European Boys' Team Championship (representing Finland): 2004
- European Amateur Team Championship (representing Finland): 2005, 2007
- European Youths' Team Championship (representing Finland): 2006
