= 2024 European Tour Qualifying School graduates =

Golf qualifying tournament in Spain

2024 European Tour Qualifying School Final Stage
Tournament information
- Dates: 8–14 November 2024
- Location: Tarragona, Spain; 41.0798°N 1.1615°E
- Courses: Infinitum Golf (Lakes & Hills Courses)
- Tours: European Tour (unofficial event)

Statistics
- Par: 71 (L); 72 (H)
- Length: 7,001 yards (6,402 m) (L); 6,956 yards (6,361 m) (H)
- Field: 156, 83 after cut
- Cut: 279 (−7)
- Prize fund: €180,000
- Winner's share: €18,000

Champion
- (Italy) Edoardo Molinari
- 399 (−29)

Location map
- Location in Spain Location in Catalonia

The 2024 European Tour Qualifying School graduates were determined following the conclusion of the 2024 European Tour (DP World Tour) Qualifying School Final Stage which was played 8–14 November at Infinitum Golf in Tarragona, Spain. It was the 47th edition of the European Tour Qualifying School. The top 20 and ties (21 in total) earned status to play on the 2025 European Tour, with the remaining players who finished outside the top 20 and ties, but having made the 72-hole cut, earning status to play on the 2025 Challenge Tour.

It was the first year in which the number of cards available at Q School had been reduced from 25 to 20 (including ties).

Edoardo Molinari won the event, scoring a six-round total of 399 (29 under par) with play being extended by one day due to adverse weather conditions. During the tournament, Vince van Veen recorded a round of 59 in round three. Jean Bekirian also became the first player from Armenia to earn a European Tour card, with Ilirian Zalli becoming the first player from Albania to earn a Challenge Tour card.

Graduates who went on to win on the European Tour in 2025 included Ryggs Johnston who won the ISPS Handa Australian Open (December 2024).

== Results ==
The top 20 players (including ties) earned status to play on the 2025 European Tour. They were as follows:

Place	Player	Score	To par
1	(Italy) Edoardo Molinari	65-61-72-68-66-67=399	−29
2	(Sweden) Niklas Lemke	66-69-74-63-64-64=400	−28
3	(United States) Davis Bryant	69-67-69-66-68-62=401	−27
T4	(South Africa) Wilco Nienaber	73-64-73-67-66-63=406	−22
T4	(Denmark) Alexander George Frances	65-69-70-66-71-65=406	−22
T4	(Spain) Albert Boneta	66-70-69-65-70-66=406	−22
T7	(France) Bastien Amat	66-70-64-67-65-66=407	−21
T7	(United States) Ryggs Johnston	71-70-69-65-65-67=407	−21
T7	(France) Clément Sordet	67-66-69-66-70-69=407	−21
T10	(England) Joshua Berry	65-70-70-68-72-63=408	−20
T10	(Armenia) Jean Bekirian	69-67-74-64-67-67=408	−20
T12	(United States) Dan Erickson	64-71-74-68-69-63=409	−19
T12	(Italy) Gregorio De Leo	70-69-68-68-68-66=409	−19
T12	(United States) Corey Shaun	68-70-69-68-67-67=409	−19
T12	(Zimbabwe) Benjamin Follett-Smith	70-67-72-64-67-69=409	−19
T12	(England) Ben Schmidt	73-66-68-66-66-70=409	−19
T12	(South Africa) Justin Harding	66-71-68-64-68-72=409	−19
T18	(Australia) Danny List	72-63-69-71-72-63=410	−18
T18	(Slovakia) Tadeáš Teťák	73-66-74-65-66-66=410	−18
T18	(Netherlands) Wil Besseling	64-70-72-67-69-68=410	−18
T18	(Denmark) Jacob Skov Olesen (a)	65-71-70-66-65-73=410	−18

The following players made the 72 hole cut, however finished outside the top 20 and ties, therefore earning status to play on the 2025 Challenge Tour.

- (Republic of Ireland) Max Kennedy (T22)
- (France) Félix Mory (T22)
- (Albania) Ilirian Zalli (T22)
- (Denmark) Christoffer Bring (T22)
- (England) Eddie Pepperell (T22)
- (New Zealand) Sam Jones (T22)
- (Italy) Filippo Celli (T22)
- (Scotland) David Law (T22)
- (United States) Palmer Jackson (T30)
- (England) Sam Hutsby (T30)
- (Australia) Haydn Barron (T30)
- (India) Rayhan Thomas (T30)
- (Denmark) Søren Broholt Lind (T30)
- (England) Callan Barrow (T30)
- (Sweden) Robin Petersson (T36)
- (France) Robin Sciot-Siegrist (T36)
- (Switzerland) Jeremy Freiburghaus (T38)
- (France) Sébastien Gros (T38)
- (England) Jamie Rutherford (T38)
- (Norway) Alexander Settemsdal (T38)
- (Austria) Lukas Nemecz (T38)
- (Norway) Andreas Halvorsen (T43)
- (Belgium) Matthis Besard (T43)
- (United States) Nick Carlson (T43)
- (Netherlands) Vince van Veen (T43)
- (Italy) Lorenzo Scalise (T43)
- (Czech Republic) Jiří Zuska (T43)
- (China) Wu Ashun (T43)
- (Netherlands) Lars van Meijel (T50)
- (United States) James Nicholas (T50)
- (United States) Gunner Wiebe (T50)
- (Austria) Maximilian Steinlechner (T50)
- (England) Matthew Southgate (T50)
- (Chile) Gabriel Morgan-Birke (T55)
- (United States) Josh Goldenberg (T55)
- (Denmark) John Axelsen (T55)
- (Germany) Tiger Christensen (a) (T58)
- (Norway) Bård Skogen (T58)
- (Spain) Sebastián García Rodríguez (T58)
- (United States) Ben Sigel (T58)
- (Wales) Rhys Enoch (T58)
- (Hong Kong) Matthew Cheung (T58)
- (United States) Matt Sharpstene (T58)
- (United States) Michael Miller (T58)
- (United States) Chase Hanna (T66)
- (Spain) Borja Virto (T66)
- (India) Saptak Talwar (T66)
- (Spain) Adri Arnaus (T66)
- (France) Nathan Legendre (T66)
- (Netherlands) Daan Huizing (T71)
- (Sweden) Henric Sturehed (T71)
- (Thailand) Denwit Boriboonsub (T73)
- (Denmark) Christian Jacobsen (T73)
- (South Africa) George Coetzee (75)
- (Scotland) Ryan Lumsden (76)
- (England) Jack Floydd (T77)
- (South Africa) Neil Schietekat (T77)
- (Sweden) Jens Fahrbring (WD)
- (England) Frank Kennedy (WD)
- (England) Tom Lewis (WD)
- (Peru) Julián Périco (WD)
- (Australia) Hayden Hopewell (WD)

== Graduates ==
Place	Player	Career ET starts	Cuts made	Best finish
1	(Italy) Edoardo Molinari	427	248	Win (x3)
2	(Sweden) Niklas Lemke	128	58	3rd/T3
3	(United States) Davis Bryant (Note: European Tour rookie in 2025)	0	0	n/a
T4	(South Africa) Wilco Nienaber	97	57	4th
T4	(Denmark) Alexander George Frances	1	0	CUT
T4	(Spain) Albert Boneta	1	0	CUT
T7	(France) Bastien Amat	2	1	T64
T7	(United States) Ryggs Johnston	0	0	n/a
T7	(France) Clément Sordet	152	67	2nd/T2
T10	(England) Joshua Berry	18	3	T23
T10	(Armenia) Jean Bekirian	0	0	n/a
T12	(United States) Dan Erickson	5	2	T32
T12	(Italy) Gregorio De Leo	6	1	T10
T12	(United States) Corey Shaun	0	0	n/a
T12	(Zimbabwe) Benjamin Follett-Smith (Note: First-time full European Tour member in 2025, but ineligible for rookie status)	24	10	T17
T12	(England) Ben Schmidt	3	1	T63
T12	(South Africa) Justin Harding	156	93	Win (x2)
T18	(Australia) Danny List	1	0	CUT
T18	(Slovakia) Tadeáš Teťák	2	0	CUT
T18	(Netherlands) Wil Besseling	153	89	2nd
T18	(Denmark) Jacob Skov Olesen (a)	3	3	T5

== 2025 Results ==
Player	Starts	Cuts made	Best finish	R2D rank	Prize money (€)
(Italy) Edoardo Molinari	11	8	T6	137	225,807
(Sweden) Niklas Lemke	21	13	T10	115	318,487
(United States) Davis Bryant (Note: Bryant retained his European Tour card for 2026 by finishing T8 at the 2025 European Tour Qualifying School.)	18	11	T4	126	279,991
(South Africa) Wilco Nienaber	16	5	T19	182	67,612
(Denmark) Alexander George Frances	15	5	T34	197	43,814
(Spain) Albert Boneta	12	3	T22	198	50,799
(France) Bastien Amat	13	2	T58	235	11,051
(United States) Ryggs Johnston	32	15	Win	72	409,410
(France) Clément Sordet	19	12	T5	119	320,533
(England) Joshua Berry (Note: Berry retained his European Tour card for 2026 by finishing 13th on the 2025 Challenge Tour Rankings.)	9	3	T6	162	132,282
(Armenia) Jean Bekirian	14	2	T21	205	39,991
(United States) Dan Erickson	16	7	T6	151	170,143
(Italy) Gregorio De Leo (Note: De Leo retained his European Tour card for 2026 by finishing T8 at the 2025 European Tour Qualifying School.)	17	7	T4	130	270,507
(United States) Corey Shaun	19	6	T9	172	82,953
(Zimbabwe) Benjamin Follett-Smith (Note: Follett-Smith retained his European Tour card for 2026 by finishing T8 at the 2025 European Tour Qualifying School.)	14	4	T41	201	38,646
(England) Ben Schmidt	27	16	3	69	554,069
(South Africa) Justin Harding	16	6	T13	173	86,405
(Australia) Danny List	16	4	T27	199	48,017
(Slovakia) Tadeáš Teťák	14	6	T13	175	93,203
(Netherlands) Wil Besseling	11	3	T57	221	20,023
(Denmark) Jacob Skov Olesen	28	18	T3	41	888,290

* European Tour rookie in 2025
T = Tied
The player retained his European Tour card for 2026 (finished inside the top 115).
The player did not retain his European Tour card for 2026, but retained conditional status (finished between 116 and 151, inclusive).
The player did not retain his European Tour card for 2026 (finished outside the top 151).

=== 2025 European Tour winners ===
No.	Date	Player	Tournament	Winning score	Margin of victory	Runner-up
1	1 Dec 2024	(United States) Ryggs Johnston	ISPS Handa Australian Open	−18 (65-68-68-68=269)	3 strokes	(Australia) Curtis Luck

== See also ==
- 2024 Challenge Tour graduates
