= 2022 European Amateur Team Championship =

Golf competition

Tournament information
- Dates: 5–9 July 2022
- Location: Sandwich, Kent, England; 51.274°N 1.367°E
- Course: Royal St George's Golf Club
- Organized by: European Golf Association
- Format: Qualification round: 36 holes stroke play Knock-out match-play

Statistics
- Par: 70
- Length: 7,204 yards (6,587 m)
- Field: 19 teams 114 players

Champion
- Spain; Alejandro Aguilera, José Luis Ballester, Javier Barcos, Luis Masaveu, David Puig, Quim Vidal
- Qualification round: 693 (−7); Final match: 4.5–2.5
- Location in Europe Location in the British Isles Location in England Location in Sandwich, Kent

The 2022 European Amateur Team Championship took place 5–9 July at Royal St George's Golf Club in Sandwich, Kent, England. It was the 39th men's golf European Amateur Team Championship.

Team Spain won the championship. Defending champion from the 2021 European Amateur Team Championship, team Denmark, finished third.

== Venue ==
Royal St George's Golf Club was founded in 1887 and had previously hosted the 1965 European Amateur Team Championship and The Open Championship 15 times, last time in 2021.

=== Course layout ===
Hole	Yards	Par	Hole	Yards	Par
1	442	4	10	412	4
2	426	4	11	242	3
3	239	3	12	379	4
4	496	4	13	457	4
5	416	4	14	545	5
6	176	3	15	493	4
7	573	5	16	161	3
8	457	4	17	424	4
9	410	4	18	456	4
Out	3,635	35	In	3,569	35
Source:		Total		7,204	70

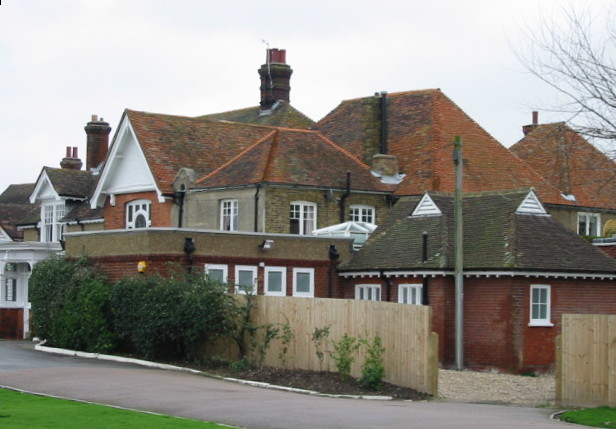
Royal St George's Golf Club clubhouse

== Format ==
Nations qualified were the teams placed 1st to 13th from the 2019 championship and the teams placed 1st, 2nd and 3rd from the 2019 and the 2021 European Amateur Team Championship Division 2.

Each nation team consisted of six players. On the first two days each player played 18 holes of stroke play each day. The lowest five scores from each team's six players counted to the team total each day.

The eight best teams formed flight A, in knock-out match-play over the following three days. The teams were seeded based on their positions after the stroke play. The first placed team to played the quarter-final against the eight placed team, the second against the seventh, the third against the sixth and the fourth against the fifth. Teams were allowed to use six players during the team matches, selecting four of them in the two morning foursome games and five players in to the afternoon single games. Teams knocked out after the quarter-finals played one foursome game and four single games in each of their remaining matches. Extra holes were played in games that were all square after 18 holes. However, if the result of the team match was already decided, undecided games were declared halved.

The teams placed 9–16 in the stroke-play stage formed flight B, to also play knock-out match-play, but with one foursome game and four single games in each match, to decide their final positions. The teams placed 17–19 formed flight C, to meet each other with one foursome game and four single games in each match, to decide their final positions.

A second division, giving nation teams the opportunity to qualify for the 2023 championship, took place at Pravets Golf Club in Bulgaria 6–9 July 2022.

== Teams ==
19 nation teams contested the event. Each team consisted of six players.

Players in the participating teams

Country	Players
Austria	Christoph Bleier, Lukas Boandl, Namu Sarmini, Florian Schweighofer, Maximilian Steinlechner, Florian Thuller
Belgium	Matthis Besard, Adrien Dumont de Chassart, Charles Roeland, James Skeet, Louis Theys, Jarno Tollenaire
Czech Republic	David Benak Petr Hruby, Filip Jakubčík, Dominik Pavoucek, Filip Raza, Vaclav Tichy
Denmark	Frederik Kjettrup, Hamish Brown, Rasmus Neergaard-Petersen, Frederik Birkelund, Jens Kristian Thysted, Søren Broholt Lind
England	Sam Bairstow, Jack Bigham, Barclay Brown, Arron Edwards-Hill, John Gough, Olly Huggins
Estonia	Carl Hellat, Kevin Christoph Jegers, Ken-Marten Soo, Joonas Juan Turba, Markus Varjun, Mattias Varjun
Finland	Elias Haavisto, Antti-Jussi Lintunen, Markus Luoma, Jesse Saareks, Oskari Schuvalow, Santeri Lehesmaa
France	Bastien Amat, Paul Beauvy, Martin Couvra, Julien Sale, Tom Vaillant, Pierre Viallaneix
Germany	Anton Albers, Jonas Baumgartner, Wolfgang Glawe, Philipp Katich, Yannick Malik, Laurenz Schiergen
Iceland	Hlynur Bergsson, Sigurdur Bjarki Blumenstein, Aron Emil Gunnarsson, Hakon Orn Magnusson, Daniel Isak Steinarsson, Kristofer Orri Thordarson
Ireland	Hugh Foley, Matthew McClean, Robert Moran, Liam Nolan, Mark Power, Caolan Rafferty
Italy	Pietro Bovari, Massimiliano Campigli, Filippo Celli, Matteo Cristoni, Lucas Nicolas Fallotico, Giovanni Manzoni
Netherlands	Jack Ingham, Jerry Ji, Benjamin Reuter, Nevill Ruiter, Lars van der Vight, Kiet van der Weele
Portugal	Vasco Alves, Hugo Camelo Ferreira, Daniel Rodrigues, Pedro Cruz Silva, Ricardo Garcia, Diogo Rocha
Scotland	Rory Franssen, Calum Scott, Connor Graham, Lewis Irvine, Callum Bruce, Angus Carrick
Spain	Alejandro Aguilera, José Luis Ballester, Javier Barcos, Luis Masaveu, David Puig, Quim Vidal
Sweden	Hugo Townsend, David Nyfjäll, Tobias Jonsson, Adam Wallin, David Lundgren, Henrik Lilja
Switzerland	Leonardo Bono, Nicola Gerhardsen, Mauro Gilardi, Cedric Gugler, Ronan Kleu, Maximilien Sturdza
Wales	James Ashfield, Archie Davies, Luke Harries, Alex James, Paddy Mullins, Matt Roberts

== Winners ==
Tied leaders of the opening 36-hole competition was team Spain and team France, each with a 7-under-par score of 693, two strokes ahead of team England. Spain was declared the winner, with the better total of the two non-counting scores.

There was no official award for the lowest individual score, but individual leader was Julien Sale, France, with a 6-under-par score of 134, two strokes ahead of nearest competitors.

Spain continued through the match-play to win the gold medal, earning their fifth title and first since 2017, beating three-times-champion Sweden in the final 4 1/2–2 1/2.

Defending champion Denmark earned the bronze on third place, after beating host nation England 5–2 in the bronze match.

== Results ==
Qualification round

Team standings after first round

Place	Country	Score	To par
1	Denmark	344	−6
2	Finland	348	−2
3	Spain	349	−1
4	England	350	E
5	Germany	350	E
6	France	351	+1
7	Italy	351	+1
8	Sweden	352	+2
9	Netherlands	357	+7
10	Austria	358	+8
11	Estonia	360	+10
12	Wales	361	+11
13	Switzerland	362	+12
14	Belgium	363	+13
15	Scotland	363	+13
16	Iceland	363	+13
17	Portugal	365	+15
18	Ireland	366	+16
19	Czech Republic	371	+21

Team standings after final qualification round

Place	Country	Score	To par
1	Spain *	349-344=693	−7
2	France	351-342=693	−7
3	England	350-345=695	−5
4	Germany	350-346=696	−4
5	Denmark	344-353=697	−3
6	Italy	351-348=699	−1
7	Sweden	352-348=700	E
8	Ireland	366-338=704	+4
9	Netherlands	357-349=706	+6
10	Finland	348-360=708	+8
11	Austria	358-355=713	+13
12	Wales	361-354=715	+15
13	Estonia	360-357=717	+17
14	Switzerland	362-356=718	+18
15	Belgium	363-358=721	+21
16	Iceland	363-361=724	+24
17	Scotland	363-363=726	+26
18	Czech Republic	371-359=730	+30
19	Portugal	365-366=731	+31

* Note: In the event of a tie the order was determined by the
best total of the two non-counting scores of the two rounds.

Individual leaders

Place	Player	Country	Score	To par
1	Julien Sale	France	67-67=134	−6
T2	Hamish Brown	Denmark	71-65=136	−4
T2	Filippo Celli	Italy	68-68=136	−4
T2	Martin Couvra	France	71-65=136	−4
T2	Arron Edwards-Hill	England	67-69=136	−4
T6	John Gough	England	71-66=137	−3
T6	Kevin Christopher Jegers	Estonia	67-70=138	−3
T8	Anton Albers	West Germany	70-68=138	−2
T8	Søren Broholt Lind	Denmark	67-71=138	−2
T8	Lucas Nicolas Fallotico	Italy	72-66=138	−2
T8	Caolan Rafferty	Ireland	73-65=138	−2
T8	Laurenz Schiergen	West Germany	67-71=138	−2
T8	Tom Vaillant	France	69-69=138	−2
T8	Adam Wallin	Sweden	69-69=138	−2

Note: There was no official award for the lowest individual scores.

Flight A

Bracket

Quarter finals
Spain	4
Ireland	3
Denmark	4
Germany	3
England	5.5
Italy	1.5
Sweden	4
France	3

Semi finals
Spain	5
Denmark	2
Sweden	4
England	3

Final
Spain	4.5
Sweden	2.5
Bronze match
Denmark	5
England	2

Elimination matches
Ireland	3
Germany	2
Italy	3
France	2

Match for 5th place
Ireland	3
Italy	2
Match for 7th place
France	4
Germany	1

Final games

Spain	Sweden
4.5	2,5
D.Puig / J.L. Ballester	D. Nyfjäll / H. Townsend 1 hole
L. Masaveu / Q. Vidal 4 & 3	H. Lilja / D. Lundgren
Javier Barcos 4 & 2	Tobias Jonsson
Luis Masaveu 3 & 2	David Nyfjäll
Alejandro Aguilera	David Lundgren 6 & 5
José Luis Ballester 3 & 2	Adam Wallin
David Puig AS *	Henrik Lilja AS *

* Note: Game declared halved, since team match already decided.

Flight B

Bracket

Round 1
Netherlands	3
Iceland	2
Estonia	3
Wales	2
Czech Republic	4
Austria	1
Finland	3
Belgium	2

Round 2
Netherlands	3.5
Estonia	1.5
Finland	3.5
Switzerland	1.5

Match for 9th place
Netherlands	3.5
Finland	1.5
Match for 11th place
Estonia	3
Switzerland	2

Elimination matches
Wales	3
Iceland	2
Belgium	3
Austria	2

Match for 13th place
Wales	4
Belgium	1
Match for 15th place
Iceland	2
Austria	3

Flight C

Team matches

1	Czech Republic	Portugal	0
3		2	

0.5	Scotland	Portugal	0.5
2.5		2.5	

1	Scotland	Czech Republic	0
3		2	

Team standings

Country	Place	W	T	L	Game points	Points
Scotland	17	1	1	0	5.5–4.5	1.5
Czech Republic	18	1	0	0	5–5	1
Portugal	19	0	1	1	4.5–5.5	0.5

Final standings

Place	Country
1st place, gold medalist(s)	Spain
2nd place, silver medalist(s)	Sweden
3rd place, bronze medalist(s)	Denmark
4	England
5	Ireland
6	Italy
7	France
8	Germany
9	Netherlands
10	Finland
11	Estonia
12	Switzerland
13	Wales
14	Belgium
15	Austria
16	Iceland
17	Scotland
18	Czech Republic
19	Portugal

== See also ==
- Eisenhower Trophy – biennial world amateur team golf championship for men organized by the International Golf Federation.
- European Amateur Championship – European amateur individual golf championship for men organised by the European Golf Association.
- European Ladies' Team Championship – European amateur team golf championship for women organised by the European Golf Association.
