= Tom Vaillant =

Spanish professional golfer (born 2001)

Personal information
- Nationality: France
- Born: 14 December 2001 (age 24) Cannes, France
- Height: 170 cm (5 ft 7 in)

Career
- Sport: Golf
- College: Arkansas State University
- Turned professional: 2022
- Current tour: European Tour
- Former tours: Challenge Tour; Alps Tour
- Professional wins: 3

Number of wins by tour
- Major tour wins: 1

Tom Vaillant (born 14 December 2001) is a French professional golfer and European Tour player.

== Amateur career ==
Vaillant was born in Cannes and had a successful amateur career. In 2019 he helped win the Jacques Léglise Trophy at Aldeburgh Golf Club in England. Alongside a team that included David Puig and Adam Wallin, they beat a UK & Ireland team with players such as Tom McKibbin and Ben Schmidt by 15 1/2 to 9 1/2.

He won the 2019 European Boys' Team Championship on home soil at Golf de Chantilly near Paris, and was on the team that finished runner-up at the 2021 European Amateur Team Championship at PGA Catalunya.

Vaillant enrolled at Arkansas State University in 2020 and played briefly with the Arkansas State Red Wolves men's golf team. He finished 3rd individually in the Bubba Barnett Intercollegiate, and recorded a 65 at the Little Rock Invitational, a top-5 lowest round in team history.

He finished 6th at the 2022 Eisenhower Trophy with Julien Sale and Martin Couvra.

== Professional career ==
Vaillant started playing on the Alps Tour as an amateur in 2021, and did not turn professional until after winning two events in 2022, securing promotion to the Challenge Tour. He tied for 3rd in his first start, at the 2023 Nelson Mandela Bay Championship.

In 2023, Vaillant was runner-up at the British Challenge behind Alex Fitzpatrick and the Rolex Challenge Tour Grand Final behind Marco Penge, to graduate to the European Tour with 12th place in the season rankings.

Vaillant ended his rookie European Tour season 90th in the rankings, after recording top-10 finishes at the ISPS Handa Championship and the Alfred Dunhill Links Championship, played at the Old Course at St Andrews, Carnoustie Golf Links and Kingsbarns Golf Links. He was tied 4th ahead of the third round weather-delay at the event in 2025, ultimately tying for 21st.

== Amateur wins ==
- 2017 Grand Prix De Nîmes Campagne, Trophee Jean Louis Jurion
- 2019 Grand Prix Jean Louis Jurion, Championnat de France Cadets

== Professional wins (3) ==
=== Alps Tour wins (2) ===
No.	Date	Tournament	Winning score	Margin of victory	Runner-up
1	12 Jun 2022	Open de la Mirabelle d'Or (as an amateur)	−14 (65-68-63=196)	Playoff	(Italy) Manfredi Manica
2	18 Jun 2022	Aravell Golf Open (as an amateur)	−22 (63-65-63=191)	6 strokes	(Finland) Eemil Alajärvi

=== French Tour wins (1) ===
No.	Date	Tournament	Winning score	Margin of victory	Runner-up
1	9 Apr 2023	Championnat de France Professionnel	−8 (66-68-68=202)	1 stroke	(France) David Ravetto

== Team appearances ==
Amateur

- Jacques Léglise Trophy (representing the Continent of Europe): 2019 (winners)
- European Boys' Team Championship (representing France): 2019
- European Amateur Team Championship (representing France): 2021, 2022
- European Nations Cup – Copa Sotogrande (representing France): 2022
- Eisenhower Trophy (representing France): 2022

== See also ==
- 2023 Challenge Tour graduates
