= Sebastian Friedrichsen =

Danish professional golfer (born 2002)

Personal information
- Nationality: Denmark
- Born: 27 September 2002 (age 24)

Career
- Sport: Golf
- Turned professional: 2022
- Current tour: European Tour
- Former tours: Challenge Tour; Nordic Golf League
- Professional wins: 2

Number of wins by tour
- Challenge Tour: 1
- Other: 1

Sebastian Friedrichsen (born 27 September 2002) is a Danish professional golfer. He won the 2026 Open de Portugal.

== Amateur career ==
Friedrichsen won the 2018 European Young Masters at Hauger Golfklubb in Norway, after he holed a 10-footer for birdie on the first hole of a playoff with Finland's Sakke Siltala. In 2018 he was runner-up, before claiming the title in 2021, at the Portuguese Internacional Amateur Championship.

Friedrichsen won the 2018 Junior Golf World Cup in Japan alongside Rasmus Højgaard and Nicolai Højgaard. He appeared in the European Boys' Team Championship twice and the European Amateur Team Championship twice, winning the 2021 event at PGA Catalunya in Spain with Christoffer Bring, Hamish Brown and Frederik Kjettrup.

== Professional career ==
Friedrichsen turned professional in September 2021 and joined the Nordic Golf League, after he finished tied 3rd at the Trust Forsikring Championship. He recorded a further three top-4 finishes that fall, before securing his first title the next spring at the 2022 ECCO Tour Spanish Masters. He recorded runner-up finishes at the Barncancerfonden Open and Thomas Bjørn Samsø Classic, to finish 5th in the season rankings and earn promotion to the Challenge Tour for 2023.

In 2023, on the Challenge Tour, he recorded top-5 finishes at the D+D Real Czech Challenge, Italian Challenge Open and Vierumäki Finnish Challenge. In November, he tied for 3rd at Q-School to graduate to the European Tour for 2024. In his rookie season, his best finish was a tie for 17th at the Omega European Masters. He dropped down to the Challenge Tour, where he won the 2026 Open de Portugal.

== Amateur wins ==
- 2017 DGU Elite Tour I, Molleaen Open, DGU Elite Tour III
- 2018 Furesøpokalen, European Young Masters
- 2019 Kronborg Masters
- 2020 Kronborg Masters
- 2021 Portuguese Internacional Amateur Championship

== Professional wins (2) ==
=== Challenge Tour wins (1) ===
No.	Date	Tournament	Winning score	Margin of victory	Runner-up
1	20 Sep 2026	Open de Portugal	−28 (64-66-64-62=256)	3 strokes	(Scotland) Marc Warren

=== Nordic Golf League wins (1) ===
No.	Date	Tournament	Winning score	Margin of victory	Runners-up
1	6 Mar 2022	ECCO Tour Spanish Masters	−13 (67-69-67=203)	Playoff	(Germany) Jannik de Bruyn, (Sweden) Joakim Wikström

== Team appearances ==
Amateur

- European Boys' Team Championship (representing Denmark): 2018, 2019
- Junior Golf World Cup (representing Denmark): 2018, 2019
- European Amateur Team Championship (representing Denmark): 2020, 2021 (winners)

== See also ==
- 2023 European Tour Qualifying School graduates
- 2026 Challenge Tour graduates
