= 2023 Alps Tour =

Golf tour season

2023 Alps Tour season
- Duration: 21 February 2023 – 20 October 2023
- Number of official events: 14
- Most wins: (Netherlands) Kiet van der Weele (3)
- Order of Merit: (Republic of Ireland) Ronan Mullarney

The 2023 Alps Tour was the 23rd season of the Alps Tour, a third-tier golf tour recognised by the European Tour.

== Schedule ==
The following table lists official events during the 2023 season.

Date	Tournament	Host country	Purse (€)	Winner (Note: The number in brackets after each winner's name is the number of Alps Tour events they had won up to and including that tournament. It is rare for someone to accumulate many wins on the Alps Tour as success at this level usually leads to promotion to the Challenge Tour.)	OWGR points	Other tours (Note: PGT − Pro Golf Tour.)
23 Feb	Ein Bay Open	Egypt	40,000	(England) Jack Floydd (1)	0.62	
28 Feb	Red Sea Little Venice Open	Egypt	40,000	(Spain) Quim Vidal (1)	0.62	
22 Apr	Alps de Las Castillas	Spain	40,000	(Netherlands) Kiet van der Weele (1)	0.84	
13 May	Gösser Open	Austria	40,000	(Republic of Ireland) Ronan Mullarney (1)	0.83	
26 May	Memorial Giorgio Bordoni	Italy	40,000	(Netherlands) Kiet van der Weele (2)	0.64	
4 Jun	Open de la Mirabelle d'Or	France	40,000	(Netherlands) Kiet van der Weele (3)	0.75	
10 Jun	Croara Alps Open	Italy	40,000	(Italy) Luca Cianchetti (4)	0.57	
17 Jun	Alps de Andalucía	Spain	40,000	(Spain) José Manuel Pardo Benítez (1)	0.70	
21 Jun	Tenerife Pro Golf Open	Spain	30,000	(Netherlands) Lars Keunen (2)	0.67	PGT
1 Jul	Aravell Golf Open	Spain	40,000	(Italy) Manfredi Manica (1)	0.65	
15 Jul	Fred Olsen Alps de La Gomera	Spain	40,000	(Italy) Gianmaria Rean Trinchero (1)	0.50	
29 Jul	Abruzzo Alps Open	Italy	40,000	(France) Oïhan Guillamoundeguy (2)	0.67	
16 Sep	Hauts de France – Pas de Calais Golf Open	France	40,000	(Republic of Ireland) Ronan Mullarney (2)	0.61	
20 Oct	Alps Tour Grand Final	Italy	50,000	(France) Augustin Holé (1)	0.53	

== Order of Merit ==
The Order of Merit was based on tournament results during the season, calculated using a points-based system. The top five players on the Order of Merit (not otherwise exempt) earned status to play on the 2024 Challenge Tour.

Position	Player	Points	Status earned
1	(Republic of Ireland) Ronan Mullarney	25,714	Promoted to Challenge Tour
2	(Spain) Quim Vidal	23,644	Qualified for Challenge Tour (made cut in Q School)
3	(Netherlands) Kiet van der Weele	22,803	Promoted to Challenge Tour
4	(France) Oïhan Guillamoundeguy	19,806	Promoted to Challenge Tour
5	(England) Jack Floydd	19,594	Promoted to Challenge Tour
6	(Netherlands) Lars Keunen	18,418	Promoted to Challenge Tour
7	(Netherlands) Davey Porsius	18,026	
8	(France) Augustin Holé	17,613	
9	(France) Benjamin Kédochim	16,212	
10	(Italy) Manfredi Manica	16,041	
