= Ryggs Johnston =

American professional golfer (born 2000)

Personal information
- Nationality: United States
- Born: May 21, 2000 (age 26) Libby, Montana, U.S.
- Height: 6 ft 3 in (191 cm)
- Weight: 165 lb (75 kg)

Career
- Sport: Golf
- College: Arizona State University
- Turned professional: 2024
- Current tour: European Tour
- Former tour: PGA Tour Americas
- Professional wins: 1

Number of wins by tour
- European Tour: 1
- PGA Tour of Australasia: 1

Best results in major championships
- Masters Tournament: DNP
- PGA Championship: DNP
- U.S. Open: DNP
- The Open Championship: T63: 2025

Achievements and awards
- Pac-12 Scholar-Athlete of the Year: 2023
- ASU Bill Kajikawa Award: 2024

Ryggs Johnston (born May 21, 2000) is an American professional golfer. He won the 2024 ISPS Handa Australian Open.

== Amateur career ==
Johnston attended Arizona State University for five years 2020–24, where he helped the Arizona State Sun Devils men's golf team to the 2024 Pac-12 title. He earned first-team All-Pac-12 honors in 2021 and 2024, and second-team honors in 2022. He earned the Pac-12 Scholar-Athlete of the Year in 2023.

== Professional career ==
After graduating in 2024, Johnston played on the PGA Tour Americas, having earned his way to the tour via PGA Tour University.

In November 2024, Johnston earned his 2025 European Tour card at Q School. In his second start, ranked world number 954, he won the ISPS Handa Australian Open at Kingston Heath Golf Club and Victoria Golf Club, an event co-sanctioned by the European Tour and the PGA Tour of Australasia. He shot a final-round 68 to beat Curtis Luck by three shots.

== Personal life ==
Johnston was named after Mel Gibson's character in Lethal Weapon.

== Amateur wins ==
- 2018 Montana State Amateur

== Professional wins (1) ==
=== European Tour wins (1) ===
| No. | Date | Tournament | Winning score | Margin of victory | Runner-up |
|---|---|---|---|---|---|
| 1 | Dec 1, 2024 (2025 season) | ISPS Handa Australian Open^{1} | −18 (65-68-68-68=269) | 3 strokes | (Australia) Curtis Luck |

^{1}Co-sanctioned by the PGA Tour of Australasia

== Results in major championships ==
| Tournament | 2025 |
|---|---|
| Masters Tournament | |
| PGA Championship | |
| U.S. Open | |
| The Open Championship | T63 |

Did not play

"T" = tied

== See also ==
- 2024 European Tour Qualifying School graduates
