= Clément Berardo =

French professional golfer

Personal information
- Nationality: France
- Born: 11 July 1986 (age 40) Auxerre, France
- Height: 1.78 m (5 ft 10 in)
- Weight: 72 kg (159 lb; 11.3 st)

Career
- Sport: Golf
- Turned professional: 2013
- Current tour: Challenge Tour
- Former tour: European Tour

Clément Berardo (born 11 July 1986) is a French professional golfer.

Berardo earned his 2016 European Tour card by finishing 22nd at qualifying school.

After three rounds of the 2016 Trophée Hassan II, Berardo was tied for second and finished tied for third.

== Playoff record ==
Challenge Tour playoff record (0–1)

No.	Year	Tournament	Opponents	Result
1	2023	Andalucía Challenge de Cádiz	(Italy) Filippo Celli, (England) Sam Hutsby, (Denmark) Nicolai Kristensen, (France) Julien Sale, (Sweden) Jesper Svensson	Hutsby won with par on third extra hole Berardo, Celli, Kristensen and Svensson eliminated by birdie on first hole

== Team appearances ==
Amateur

- European Amateur Team Championship (representing France): 2010

== See also ==
- 2015 European Tour Qualifying School graduates
