= Gregorio De Leo =

Italian professional golfer (born 2000)

Personal information
- Nationality: Italy
- Born: 8 April 2000 (age 26) Biella, Piedmont, Italy

Career
- Sport: Golf
- Turned professional: 2021
- Current tour: European Tour
- Former tours: Challenge Tour; Alps Tour
- Professional wins: 4

Achievements and awards
- Alps Tour Order of Merit winner: 2022

Gregorio De Leo (born 8 April 2000) is an Italian professional golfer who plays on the European Tour. In 2022 he shot a 59 on his way to earn battlefield promotion to the Challenge Tour.

== Early life and amateur career ==
De Leo was born in Biella in the northern Italian region of Piedmont. He was runner-up at the 2020 Italian Amateur Stroke Play Championship (Franco Bevione Trophy) behind Giovanni Manzoni, and won the 2021 Italian International Amateur Championship.

He represented Italy at both the European Boys' Team Championship and European Amateur Team Championship, reaching a semi-final in 2020 to finish 4th.

De Leo started playing on the Alps Tour in 2021, and was runner-up at the Gösser Open in Austria, after which he turned professional ahead of his debut at the Italian Open.

== Professional career ==
In 2022, De Leo topped the Alps Tour Order of Merit after winning three tournaments and earning battlefield promotion to the Challenge Tour.

He tied for 3rd at the 2023 Le Vaudreuil Golf Challenge, and recorded six top-10 finishes in 2024 to finish 33rd in the Challenge Tour season rankings.

De Leo earned his card for the 2025 European Tour at Q-School. In his rookie season, he recorded top-5 finishes at the Magical Kenya Open and Danish Golf Championship.

== Amateur wins ==
- 2017 Gran Premio di Monticello
- 2018 Italian U18 Trofeo Silvio Marazza
- 2019 Trofeo Glauco Lolli Ghetti
- 2020 Gara del Golf Club Castelconturbia
- 2021 Coppa d'Oro Mario Camicia, Italian International Amateur Championship

== Professional wins (4) ==
=== Alps Tour wins (3) ===
No.	Date	Tournament	Winning score	Margin of victory	Runner(s)-up
1	29 May 2022	Memorial Giorgio Bordoni	−18 (67-66-59=192)	4 strokes	(France) Pierre Pineau
2	10 Jul 2022	Alps de Las Castillas	−20 (65-66-65=196)	1 stroke	(Switzerland) Mathias Eggenberger
3	24 Aug 2022	Roma Alps Open	−20 (64-68-64=196)	3 strokes	(Republic of Ireland) Gary Hurley, (Italy) Stefano Mazzoli

=== Other wins (1) ===
- 2022 Italian PGA Championship

== Team appearances ==
Amateur

- Junior Golf World Cup (representing Italy): 2018
- European Boys' Team Championship (representing Italy): 2018
- European Amateur Team Championship (representing Italy): 2020, 2021

== See also ==
- Lowest rounds of golf
- 2024 European Tour Qualifying School graduates
- 2025 European Tour Qualifying School graduates
