= 2020 European Amateur Team Championship =

Golf competition

Tournament information
- Dates: 10–12 September 2020
- Location: Hilversum, Netherlands; 52°12′N 5°12′E
- Course: Hilversumsche Golf Club
- Organized by: European Golf Association
- Format: Qualification round: 18 holes stroke play Knock-out match-play

Statistics
- Par: 72
- Length: 6,890 yards (6,300 m)
- Field: 14 teams 56 players

Champion
- Germany; Nick Bachem, Jannik de Bruyn, Marc Hammer, Matti Schmid
- Qualification round: 202 (−14); Final match: 2–1

Location map
- Location in Europe Location in the Netherlands

The 2020 European Amateur Team Championship took place 10–12 September at Hilversumsche Golf Club in the Netherlands. It was the 37th men's golf European Amateur Team Championship.

== Venue ==
The club was founded in 1895, as the fourth golf club in the Netherlands. Its course for the championship consisted of nine holes opened in 1918, designed by Henry Burrows, and nine holes opened in 1928, designed by Harry Colt. Latest major course changes were designed by Kyle Philips in 2009.

The championship course was set up with par 72.

== Format ==
Due to the COVID-19 pandemic, the championship was played in a reduced format, with 14 teams participating, each of them with four players. All competitors played one 18-hole-round of stroke-play on the first day. The team scores were based on the leading three scores of each team.

After the first day the leading eight teams formed flight A and competed in knock-out match-play over the next three days. The teams were being seeded based on their positions after the stroke play. Contests consisted of one foursome game in the morning and two singles in the afternoon. If a game was level after 18 holes, extra holes were played to get a result, although if the overall match result was already determined, later games that were level after 18 holes were halved.

The remaining teams, not qualified for Flight A, competed in a similar bracket in Flight B, to determine their final standings.

== Teams ==
14 nation teams contested the event. Each team consisted of four players. Switzerland and Italy had qualified for the championship by finishing first and second in the 2019 Division 2. The other teams qualified through the 2019 championship.

Among teams qualified for the championship, England, Scotland, Ireland, Wales, Spain and Portugal did not participate.

Players in the teams

Country	Players
Austria	Christoph Bleier, Paul Kamml, Maximilian Lechner, Niklas Regner
Belgium	James Meyer de Beco, Jean de Wouters d'Oplinter, Arnaud Galand, Charles Roeland
Czech Republic	Petr Hruby, Petr Janik, Vaclav Tichy, Matyas Zapletal
Denmark	Hamish Brown, Sebastian Friedrichsen, August Thor Høst, Frederik Kjettrup
Estonia	Carl Hellat, Kevin Jegers, Ken-Marten Soo, Mattias Varjun
France	Tom Gueant, Adrien Pendaries, David Ravetto, Julien Sale
Germany	Nick Bachem, Jannik de Bruyn, Marc Hammer, Matti Schmid
Iceland	Kristofer Karl Karlsson, Aron Snaer Juliusson, Hakon Orn Magnusson, Dagbjartur Sigurbrandsson
Italy	Riccardo Bregoli, Filippo Celli, Gregorio De Leo, Andrea Romano
Netherlands	Bob Geurts, Jerry Ji, Nordin van Tilburg, Kiet van der Weele
Slovakia	Lukas Ruzek, Matej Babic, Pavol Mach, Lukas Gabura
Slovenia	Jaka Babnik, Jakob Balkovec, Luka Strasek, Jan Hribernik
Sweden	Gustav Andersson, Albin Bergström, Vincent Norrman, David Nyfjäll
Switzerland	Robert Foley, Nicola Gerhardsen, Mauro Gilardi, Ronan Kleu

== Winners ==
Leader of the opening 18-hole competition was team Germany, with a 14-under-par score of 202, eight strokes ahead of host nation Netherlands. Defending champion team Sweden was another four strokes behind.

There was no official award for the lowest individual score, but individual leader was Matti Schmid, Germany, with a 10-under-par score of 62, six strokes ahead of nearest competitor.

Germany won the gold medal, earning their first title, beating defending champions team Sweden in the final 2–1.

Team Switzerland earned the bronze on third place, after beating Italy 2–1 in the bronze match.

== Results ==
Qualification round

Team standings

Place	Country	Score	To par
1	Germany	202	−14
2	Netherlands	210	−6
3	Sweden	214	−2
T4	France *	215	−1
T4	Switzerland	215	−1
T6	Denmark *	216	E
T6	Italy	216	E
T8	Austria *	217	+1
T8	Iceland	217	+1
10	Estonia	221	+5
11	Belgium	223	+7
12	Czech Republic	224	+8
13	Slovakia	225	+9
14	Slovenia	226	+10

* Note: In the event of a tie the order was determined by the
best total of the two non-counting scores of the two rounds.

Individual leaders

Place	Player	Country	Score	To par
1	Matti Schmid	Germany	62	−10
2	Kiet van der Weele	Netherlands	68	−4
T3	Marc Hammer	Germany	69	−3
T3	Julien Sale	France	69	−3
T5	Ronan Kleu	Switzerland	70	−2
T5	Andrea Romano	Italy	70	−2
T7	Gustav Andersson	Sweden	71	−1
T7	Nick Bachem	Germany	71	−1
T7	Lukas Gabura	Slovakia	71	−1
T7	Mauro Gilardi	Switzerland	71	−1
T7	Jerry Ji	Netherlands	71	−1
T7	Aron Snar Juliusson	Iceland	71	−1
T7	Frederik Kjettrup	Denmark	71	−1
T7	Maximilian Lechner	Austria	71	−1
T7	Vincent Norrman	Sweden	71	−1
T7	Nordin van Tilburg	Netherlands	71	−1

Note: There was no official award for the lowest individual score.

Flight A

Bracket

Quarter finals
Germany	2.5
Austria	0.5
Switzerland	3
France	0
Sweden	2
Denmark	0.5
Italy	2
Netherlands	1

Semi finals
Germany	2.5
Switzerland	0.5
Sweden	2
Italy	1

Final
Germany	2
Sweden	1
Bronze match
Switzerland	2
Italy	1

Elimination matches
Austria	2.5
France	0.5
Netherlands	2
Denmark	1

Match for 5th place
Netherlands	2
Austria	1
Match for 7th place
France	2
Denmark	1

Final games

Germany	Sweden
2	1
N. Bachem / M. Hammer 19th hole	D. Nyfjäll / A. Bergström
Matti Schmid 6 & 5	Gustav Andersson
Jannik de Bruyn	Vincent Norrman 2 & 1

Flight B

Bracket

Round 1
Czech Republic	2
Slovakia	1
Belgium	3
Slovenia	0

Round 2
Iceland	2
Czech Republic	1
Belgium	2
Estonia	1

Match for 9th place
Iceland	2
Belgium	1
Match for 11th place
Estonia	2
Czech Republic	1

Round 1

Match for 13th place
Slovakia	2.5
Slovenia	0.5

Final standings

Place	Country
1st place, gold medalist(s)	Germany
2nd place, silver medalist(s)	Sweden
3rd place, bronze medalist(s)	Switzerland
4	Italy
5	Netherlands
6	Austria
7	France
8	Denmark
9	Iceland
10	Belgium
11	Estonia
12	Czech Republic
13	Slovakia
14	Slovenia

== See also ==
- Eisenhower Trophy – biennial world amateur team golf championship for men organized by the International Golf Federation.
- European Ladies' Team Championship – European amateur team golf championship for women organised by the European Golf Association.
