= Davis Bryant =

American professional golfer (born 2000)

Personal information
- Nationality: United States
- Born: January 7, 2000 (age 26) Aurora, Colorado, U.S.

Career
- Sport: Golf
- College: Colorado State University
- Turned professional: 2023
- Current tour: European Tour
- Former tour: Challenge Tour
- Professional wins: 1

Davis Bryant (born January 7, 2000) is an American professional golfer from Colorado and a European Tour player. He was runner-up at the 2026 Magical Kenya Open.

== Early life and amateur career ==
Bryant was born on January 7, 2000, in Aurora, Colorado into a golfing family. His father is the General Manager at Green Valley Ranch Golf Club in Denver, while his mother is the COO of the Colorado Open Golf Foundation.

Bryant was ranked the top amateur in Colorado and won the Colorado Junior PGA Championship, Colorado Junior Amateur Championship, Colorado Amateur Championship, and GCAA Amateur Series – Colorado.

He attended Colorado State University for five years from 2018 to 2023. Playing with the Colorado State Rams men's golf team, he led the team in scoring and was named All-American.

== Professional career ==
Bryant turned professional in 2023 and moved to his grandparents in Phoenix, Arizona, to start playing on mini tours. He won the 2024 Colorado Open, collecting a $100,000 winner's check.

In November 2024, Bryant earned his 2025 European Tour card after shooting a 62 on his way to finishing 3rd at Q School. After a season-best finish of tied 4th at the BMW International Open in Germany, he finished 126th in the season rankings, and went back to Q School to keep his full card.

In 2026, he was runner-up at the Magical Kenya Open, 3 strokes behind Casey Jarvis.

== Amateur wins ==
- 2017 Colorado Junior PGA Championship, Colorado Junior Amateur Championship
- 2018 Colorado Junior PGA Championship
- 2019 Colorado Amateur Championship
- 2020 GCAA Amateur Series – Colorado
- 2021 Paintbrush Invitational
- 2022 Southwestern Amateur
- 2023 Southwestern Amateur

== Professional wins (1) ==
=== Other wins (1) ===
- 2024 Colorado Open

== See also ==
- 2024 European Tour Qualifying School graduates
- 2025 European Tour Qualifying School graduates
