= Ronan Mullarney =

Irish professional golfer

Personal information
- Nationality: Ireland
- Born: 12 September 1995 (age 31) Galway, Ireland

Career
- Sport: Golf
- College: Maynooth University
- Turned professional: 2019
- Current tour: Alps Tour
- Professional wins: 6

Best results in major championships
- Masters Tournament: DNP
- PGA Championship: DNP
- U.S. Open: DNP
- The Open Championship: CUT: 2022

Achievements and awards
- Alps Tour Order of Merit winner: 2023

Ronan Mullarney (born 12 September 1995) is an Irish professional golfer from Galway. He turned professional in 2019 and also played in the 2022 Open Championship.

== Amateur career ==
Mullarney attended Maynooth University. In 2018, he won the R&A Foundation Scholars Tournament at St Andrews, a win that gave him a place in the 2018 Arnold Palmer Cup. In 2019, he won the Irish Amateur Close Championship at Ballybunion, beating Robert Brazill in the final.

== Professional career ==
Mullarney turned professional in 2019. In June 2022, he qualified for The Open Championship for the first time after sharing second place with Jamie Rutherford in the 36-hole Final Qualifying competition at Prince's Golf Club in Kent.

In May 2023, Mullarney won his first professional tournament on the Alps Tour at the Gösser Open.

== Amateur wins ==
- 2016 Mullingar Electrical Scratch Trophy
- 2017 BUCS Golf Tour - Fife Tournament
- 2018 R&A Foundation Scholars Tournament, Irish Student Amateur Open Championship, BUCS Golf Tour - Stirling International
- 2019 Irish Amateur Close Championship

== Professional wins (6) ==
=== Alps Tour wins (2) ===
No.	Date	Tournament	Winning score	Margin of victory	Runner(s)-up
1	13 May 2023	Gösser Open	−12 (64-68=132) (Note: Shortened to 36 holes due to weather.)	4 strokes	(Italy) Gianmaria Rean Trinchero
2	16 Sep 2023	Hauts de France – Pas de Calais Golf Open	−16 (67-64-66=197)	9 strokes	(Italy) Enrico Di Nitto, (Italy) Manfredi Manica

=== Toro Tour wins (4) ===
No.	Date	Tournament	Winning score	Margin of victory	Runner-up
1	19 Jan 2022	Valle Ramano 3	−6 (71-69-67=207)	1 stroke	(Germany) Bernd Ritthammer
2	19 Jan 2023	La Canada Golf 1	+1 (74-68-72=214)	4 strokes	(England) Luke Woods
3	1 Feb 2023	Villa Padierna Golf 1	−5 (70-70-74=214)	1 stroke	(England) Harvey Byers
4	17 Jan 2024	San Roque Golf 1	−9 (71-64=135)	4 strokes	(Spain) Ignacio Mateo Fraga

== Results in major championships ==
Tournament	2022
Masters Tournament	
PGA Championship	
U.S. Open	
The Open Championship	CUT

Did not play

CUT = missed the half-way cut

== Team appearances ==
Amateur

- Arnold Palmer Cup (representing the International team): 2018
- European Amateur Team Championship (representing Ireland): 2019
