= Challenge de Cádiz =

Golf tournament in Spain

Tournament information
- Location: Cádiz, Spain
- Established: 2020
- Course: Iberostar Real Club de Golf Novo Sancti Petri
- Par: 72
- Length: 7,064 yards (6,459 m)
- Tour: Challenge Tour
- Format: Stroke play
- Prize fund: €300,000
- Month played: May/June

Tournament record score
- Aggregate: 269 Kristof Ulenaers (2021)
- To par: −19 as above

Current champion
- (Spain) Rocco Repetto

Location map
- Location in Spain Location in Andalusia

The Challenge de Cádiz is a golf tournament on the Challenge Tour. It was played for the first time in November 2020 at Novo Sancti Petri Golf Club in Cádiz, Spain.

Pep Anglès won the inaugural tournament, winning by one shot ahead of Matthew Baldwin and Alfredo García-Heredia.

== Winners ==
Year	Winner	Score	To par	Margin of victory	Runner(s)-up
Challenge de Cádiz
2025	(Spain) Rocco Repetto	275	−13	1 stroke	(Spain) Victor Pastor
2024	(Denmark) Jonathan Gøth-Rasmussen	273	−15	1 stroke	(Republic of Ireland) Gary Hurley
Andalucía Challenge de Cádiz
2023	(England) Sam Hutsby	273	−15	Playoff	(France) Clément Berardo (Italy) Filippo Celli (Denmark) Nicolai Kristensen (France) Julien Sale (Sweden) Jesper Svensson
Challenge de Cádiz
2022: No tournament
2021	(Belgium) Kristof Ulenaers	269	−19	5 strokes	(Germany) Hurly Long
Andalucía Challenge de Cádiz
2020	(Spain) Pep Anglès	274	−14	1 stroke	(England) Matthew Baldwin (Spain) Alfredo García-Heredia
