= Quim Vidal =

Spanish professional golfer

Personal information
- Full name: Joaquim Vidal Mora
- Nationality: Spain
- Born: 9 December 1999 (age 26) Barcelona, Spain

Career
- Sport: Golf
- College: Jacksonville State University; University of Nevada, Reno
- Turned professional: 2022
- Current tour: Challenge Tour
- Former tour: Alps Tour
- Professional wins: 2

Number of wins by tour
- Challenge Tour: 1
- Other: 1

Joaquim Vidal Mora (born 9 December 1999) is a Spanish professional golfer, currently playing on the Challenge Tour.

== Early life ==
Vidal was born in Barcelona to Joaquim Vidal and Monica Mora, and has a sister.

== Amateur career ==
Vidal attended university at both Jacksonville State University and University of Nevada, Reno. In his college career, he spent four years in Jacksonville and then transferred to Nevada for a year. In his freshman year, he was named to the conference's All-Newcomer Team and All-Tournament Team; in his senior year (at Nevada) he was named to the conference's All-Conference Team, recording the best statistics in the college's history.

In July 2022, Vidal was part of the Spanish team that won the 2022 European Amateur Team Championship.

== Professional career ==
Vidal turned professional in 2022. He started on the Alps Tour. On the 2023 Alps Tour, he won the Red Sea Little Venice Open and made it to the Alps Tour Grand Final at Asolo. Taking the contest to sudden death, Vidal ultimately came second to Augustin Holé. His second place finish on the Order of Merit ensured his promotion to the Challenge Tour but he improved his status through his 2023 European Tour Qualifying School finish.

At the 2024 Le Vaudreuil Golf Challenge, he finished the first day at eight under par to hold the lead. He won his first Challenge Tour title during the 2025 Challenge Tour, at the PGTI Delhi Challenge.

== Amateur wins ==
- 2021 Bash at the Beach, Saint Mary's Invitational

== Professional wins (2) ==
=== Challenge Tour wins (1) ===
No.	Date	Tournament	Winning score	Margin of victory	Runner-up
1	23 Mar 2025	Delhi Challenge^{1}	−18 (65-68-66-71=270)	Playoff	(England) Joshua Berry

^{1}Co-sanctioned by the Professional Golf Tour of India

Challenge Tour playoff record (1–0)

No.	Year	Tournament	Opponent	Result
1	2025	Delhi Challenge	(England) Joshua Berry	Won with birdie on third extra hole

=== Alps Tour wins (1) ===
No.	Date	Tournament	Winning score	Margin of victory	Runners-up
1	28 Feb 2023	Red Sea Little Venice Open	−14 (68-66-68=202)	Playoff	(Egypt) Issa Abou El Ela (a), (Netherlands) Lars Keunen, (Netherlands) Davey Porsius

== Team appearances ==
Amateur

- European Amateur Team Championship (representing Spain): 2022 (winners)

== See also ==
- 2025 Challenge Tour graduates
