= Matti Schmid =

German professional golfer (born 1997)

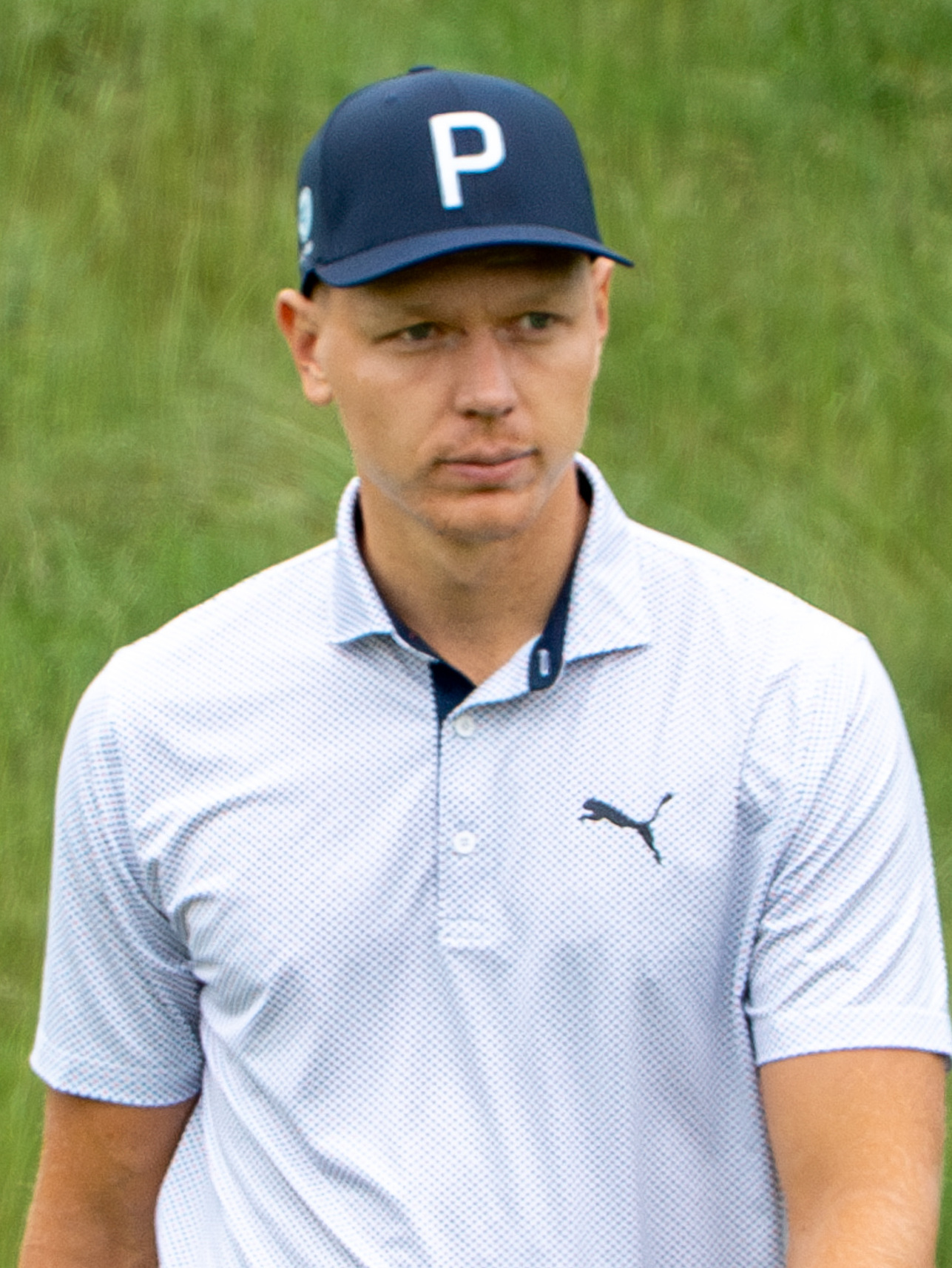
- Schmid at the 2025 Travelers Championship

Personal information
- Full name: Matthias Schmid
- Nationality: Germany
- Born: 18 November 1997 (age 28)

Career
- Sport: Golf
- College: University of Louisville
- Turned professional: 2021
- Current tours: PGA Tour; European Tour
- Highest ranking: 65 (17 May 2026) (as of 25 October 2026)

Best results in major championships
- Masters Tournament: DNP
- PGA Championship: T4: 2026
- U.S. Open: CUT: 2021, 2026
- The Open Championship: T59: 2021

Achievements and awards
- Sir Henry Cotton Rookie of the Year: 2021

Matthias Schmid (born 18 November 1997) is a German professional golfer. He won the European Amateur in both 2019 and 2020 and was the leading amateur at the 2021 Open Championship.

== Amateur career ==
Schmid competed for the Louisville Cardinals from 2017 to 2021, winning the Old Town Club Collegiate in 2018.

Schmid won the European Amateur in both 2019 and 2020. The 2019 event was held at the Diamond Country Club in Austria. Schmid led after a third-round 63 and won by three strokes from Euan Walker. He retained the title at Zurich Golf and Country Club in Switzerland in September 2020, again winning by three strokes, this time from fellow-German Nick Bachem.

In the 2021 Open Championship, Schmid had a second-round 65 to equal the record for the lowest round by an amateur in the Open Championship; a record set by Tom Lewis in 2011, also at Royal St George's. Schmid had an opening-round 74, leaving him on 139 after two rounds, 1-under-par, making the cut by two strokes. He had further rounds 71 and 72 for a total of 282, 2-over-par. He finished four strokes ahead of Lin Yuxin, the only other amateur to make cut, to win the silver medal as the leading amateur at the championship.

== Professional career ==
After the 2021 Open Championship, Schmid turned professional and was invited to the following week's tournament on the European Tour, the Cazoo Open at Celtic Manor Resort, Wales. In September, he finished runner-up in the Dutch Open, three shots behind Kristoffer Broberg. In December 2021, Schmid was announced as the Sir Henry Cotton Rookie of the Year for the 2021 European Tour season.

Schmid continued to compete on the European Tour in 2022. In March, he finished tied third at the Steyn City Championship in South Africa. Other highlight performances included an eighth-place finish at the Barbasol Championship in Kentucky, and a ninth-placed finish at the Cazoo Open in Wales.

== Amateur wins ==
- 2017 Bavarian Mens Championship
- 2018 Old Town Club Collegiate
- 2019 European Amateur
- 2020 European Amateur

== Results in major championships ==
Results not in chronological order in 2020.

Tournament	2019	2020	2021	2022	2023	2024	2025	2026
Masters Tournament								
PGA Championship								T4
U.S. Open			CUT					CUT
The Open Championship	CUT	NT	T59LA				69	

Top 10
Did not play

LA = low amateur
CUT = missed the half-way cut
"T" indicates a tie for a place
NT = no tournament due to COVID-19 pandemic

== Results in The Players Championship ==
Tournament	2025	2026
The Players Championship	CUT	T46

CUT = missed the half-way cut
"T" = tied

== Team appearances ==
Amateur

- European Amateur Team Championship (representing Germany): 2019, 2020 (winners), 2021
- Arnold Palmer Cup (representing the International Team): 2020 (winners), 2021

== See also ==
- 2022 Korn Ferry Tour Finals graduates
