= 2021 Alps Tour =

Golf tour season

2021 Alps Tour season
- Duration: 24 March 2021 – 16 October 2021
- Number of official events: 14
- Most wins: (Italy) Jacopo Vecchi Fossa (2) (Spain) Ángel Hidalgo (2) (Scotland) Ryan Lumsden (2)
- Order of Merit: (Italy) Jacopo Vecchi Fossa

The 2021 Alps Tour was the 21st season of the Alps Tour, a third-tier golf tour recognised by the European Tour.

== Schedule ==
The following table lists official events during the 2021 season.

Date	Tournament	Host country	Purse (€)	Winner (Note: The number in brackets after each winner's name is the number of Alps Tour events they had won up to and including that tournament. It is rare for someone to accumulate many wins on the Alps Tour as success at this level usually leads to promotion to the Challenge Tour.)	OWGR points	Other tours (Note: LETAS − LET Access Series.)
26 Mar	MIRA Golf Experience Acaya Open	Italy	35,000	(Scotland) Ryan Lumsden (1)	4	
30 Mar	MIRA Live the Soul Open	Italy	35,000	(France) Paul Margolis (a) (1)	4	
24 Apr	Abruzzo Alps Open	Italy	40,000	(Italy) Jacopo Vecchi Fossa (2)	4	
30 Apr	Antognolla Alps Open	Italy	40,000	(Italy) Stefano Mazzoli (2)	4	
21 May	Ein Bay Open	Egypt	40,000	(Spain) Ángel Hidalgo (1)	4	
25 May	Red Sea Little Venice Open	Egypt	40,000	(Italy) Luca Cianchetti (3)	4	
13 Jun	Open de la Mirabelle d'Or	France	40,000	(France) Franck Médale (1)	4	
18 Jun	Memorial Giorgio Bordoni	Italy	40,000	(Spain) Ángel Hidalgo (2)	4	
9 Jul	Alps de Las Castillas	Spain	40,000	(Scotland) Ryan Lumsden (2)	4	
17 Jul	Roma Alps LETAS Open	Italy	45,000	(France) Xavier Poncelet (2)	4	LETAS (Note: Mixed event)
21 Aug	Gösser Open	Austria	40,000	(France) Paul Elissalde (1)	4	
11 Sep	Alps de Andalucía	Spain	40,000	(France) Edgar Catherine (2)	4	
9 Oct	Golf Nazionale Alps Open	Italy	40,000	(Italy) Jacopo Vecchi Fossa (3)	4	
16 Oct	Emilia-Romagna Alps Tour Grand Final	Italy	50,000	(Spain) Víctor García Broto (1)	4	

== Order of Merit ==
The Order of Merit was based on tournament results during the season, calculated using a points-based system. The top five players on the Order of Merit (not otherwise exempt) earned status to play on the 2022 Challenge Tour.

Position	Player	Points	Status earned
1	(Italy) Jacopo Vecchi Fossa	28,050	Promoted to Challenge Tour
2	(Scotland) Ryan Lumsden	23,504	Promoted to Challenge Tour
3	(Spain) Ángel Hidalgo	21,899	Finished in Top 70 of Challenge Tour Rankings
4	(Spain) Víctor García Broto	18,691	Promoted to Challenge Tour
5	(France) Paul Elissalde	16,071	Promoted to Challenge Tour
6	(France) Paul Margolis (a)	16,030	Promoted to Challenge Tour
7	(France) Frank Medale	15,237	
8	(Italy) Stefano Mazzoli	15,071	
9	(Portugal) Vitor Lopes	14,814	
10	(France) Edgar Catherine	14,432	
