= Filippo Celli =

Italian professional golfer

Personal information
- Nationality: Italy
- Born: 6 September 2000 (age 26) Rome, Italy

Career
- Sport: Golf
- College: Texas Christian University
- Turned professional: 2022
- Current tour: Challenge Tour
- Former tour: European Tour
- Professional wins: 1

Number of wins by tour
- Challenge Tour: 1

Best results in major championships
- Masters Tournament: DNP
- PGA Championship: DNP
- U.S. Open: CUT: 2026
- The Open Championship: T47: 2022

Filippo Celli (born 9 September 2000) is an Italian professional golfer who plays on the European Tour. In 2022, he won the European Amateur, the silver medal at the Open Championship, and the Eisenhower Trophy.

== Amateur career ==
Celli was born in Rome in 2000 and only got started playing golf when he was 13 years old. He won the 2018 Castello di Marco Simone Trophy and the 2019 Italian Amateur Stroke Play Championship. He attended Texas Christian University on a scholarship and played with the TCU Horned Frogs men's golf team for two years, 2020–22.

Celli won the 2022 European Amateur to earn a spot at the 2022 Open Championship at Old Course at St Andrews, where he shot a 5-under 283 to finish in a tie for 47th and win the silver medal as low amateur. A few weeks later, he finished in a tie for 7th at the ISPS Handa World Invitational.

In September, Celli won the 2022 Eisenhower Trophy at Le Golf National with the Italian team, and turned professional shortly afterwards.

== Professional career ==
Celli played on the 2023 Challenge Tour where he lost a six-way playoff at the Andalucía Challenge de Cádiz. In November 2023, Celli obtained his European Tour card when he finished second at the European Tour Qualifying School.

== Amateur wins ==
- 2018 Castello di Marco Simone Trophy
- 2019 Italian Amateur Stroke Play Championship (Franco Bevione Trophy)
- 2022 European Amateur

== Professional wins (1) ==
=== Challenge Tour wins (1) ===
No.	Date	Tournament	Winning score	Margin of victory	Runner-up
1	24 Aug 2025	Dutch Futures	−15 (71-71-62-65=269)	2 strokes	(Germany) Hurly Long

Challenge Tour playoff record (0–1)

No.	Year	Tournament	Opponents	Result
1	2023	Andalucía Challenge de Cádiz	(France) Clément Berardo, (England) Sam Hutsby, (Denmark) Nicolai Kristensen, (France) Julien Sale, (Sweden) Jesper Svensson	Hutsby won with par on third extra hole Berardo, Celli, Kristensen and Svensson eliminated by birdie on first hole

== Results in major championships ==
Tournament	2022	2023	2024	2025	2026
Masters Tournament					
PGA Championship					
U.S. Open					CUT
The Open Championship	T47 LA				

Did not play

LA = low amateur
CUT = missed the half way cut
"T" = tied

== Team appearances ==
Amateur

- European Boys' Team Championship (representing Italy): 2018
- European Amateur Team Championship (representing Italy): 2019, 2020, 2021, 2022
- Eisenhower Trophy (representing Italy): 2022 (winners)

== See also ==
- 2023 European Tour Qualifying School graduates
- 2025 Challenge Tour graduates
