= Lukas Boandl =

Austrian professional golfer (born 2002)

Personal information
- Nationality: Austria
- Born: 26 January 2002 (age 24) Königsdorf, Austria

Career
- Sport: Golf
- College: Rice University
- Turned professional: 2026

Lukas Boandl (born 26 January 2002) is an Austrian professional golfer and a 2026 graduate of Rice University, where he played on the men's golf team. He represented Austria in international amateur competitions and, while maintaining amateur status, competed in professional events on the DP World Tour, Challenge Tour, Pro Golf Tour, and Alps Tour.

== Early life ==
Boandl grew up in Königsdorf, Austria and attended BHAK Fürstenfeld for high school in Fürstenfeld, Austria. In 2020, he recorded three top-five finishes in national events, including third in both the Austrian Under-18 Match Play and the Vienna County Championship. As a junior, he represented Austria in tournaments including the Evian Junior Championship, the Junior Open in England, the European Young Masters, and the European Boys' Team Championship. In 2021, Boandl recorded a 72.0 stroke average and won the Styrian Championship with a birdie on the final hole; and tied for ninth at the PGA of Austria Championship (as the low amateur) and was placed seventh at the Austrian International Amateur. In August of the same year, he made the cut at the Gösser Open, an Alps Tour event in Maria Lankowitz, Austria. In 2022, he competed on the Pro Golf Tour and finished tied for tenth at the Raiffeisen Pro Golf Tour event in St. Pölten, Austria.

== College career ==
Boandl accepted a scholarship to study and play golf in the NCAA Division I at Rice University in Houston, Texas. As a freshman in the 2022–23 season, he was one of two golfers from Rice to appear in every tournament and was named to the Conference USA All-Freshman Team. In his sophomore year (2023–24), Rice moved to the American Athletic Conference, and Boandl recorded a 73.88 scoring average with multiple top-20 finishes. During that season, he tied for 12th at the 2023 Argent Financial Classic and finished 13th at the Hoosier Collegiate. In his junior year (2024–25), he was named to the AAC All-Conference Team and led Rice with a 71.34 stroke average (−0.28 vs. par), which was the second-lowest single-season average in program history. In September 2024, Boandl won the Argent Financial Classic at 10 under par, becoming the fourth Rice golfer to finish a tournament at −10 or better. Later that year, he tied for first at the Bayou City Collegiate Classic at 12 under par, tying the second-lowest 54-hole score to par in program history. During the season, he set program records including the lowest 36-hole total (133) and became the first Rice golfer to record two rounds of 65 or better in a single season. He finished the 2024–25 season with three top-five and three top-10 finishes and received an at-large individual invitation to the 2025 NCAA Regional in Bremerton, Washington, where he tied for 19th.

In his senior year (2025–26), Boandl tied for first at the Trinity Forest Invitational in October 2025, shooting 15 under par (201) with rounds of 66–66–69; he lost a playoff for the medalist honour, with the result counting as his third career collegiate title (co-champion), tying the Rice program record for most tournament wins by a golfer. He earned a runner-up finish at the Bayou City Collegiate Classic, finishing 8 under par to help the Owls to the team title. At the Mossy Oak Collegiate he tied for fifth at 5 under par, earning American Conference Golfer of the Week honours. At the American Championship in Sarasota, Florida, he opened with a 66 and finished tied for ninth. He closed his collegiate career tied for 19th at the 2026 NCAA Athens Regional.

Boandl set Rice single-season records in 2025–26 for stroke average (70.46), average vs. par (−1.11), rounds of par or better (25), and rounds in the 60s (15), becoming the first golfer in school history with at least 10 rounds in the 60s in a season twice. He also set a school record for the lowest 36-hole score (132, consecutive rounds of 66). He was a unanimous selection to the American All-Conference Team for the second straight year and was named to the PING All-Central Region Team — only the second Rice golfer to earn All-Region honours, and the first since Michael Whitehead in 2011. He was also named an All-America Scholar and Academic All-District.

== Professional tour appearances ==
While maintaining amateur status, Boandl competed in professional events in Austria. In May 2025, he played in the DP World Tour's Austrian Alpine Open at Gut Altentann Golf Club, shooting 74 and 71 (+5) to miss the 36-hole cut. In the first round, he holed an approach shot for birdie on the 12th hole. In July 2025, he played the Interwetten Open in Schladming, Austria, making the cut and finishing tied for 61st at 5 under par. In July 2024, he played the Euram Bank Open at GC Adamstal but missed the cut.

As a teenager, Boandl competed on the Alps Tour and made the cut at the 2021 Gösser Open. In May 2024, he competed again at the Gösser Open, finishing 47th. He also competed on the Pro Golf Tour, including a tied-10th finish at an event in St. Pölten in 2022. In August 2025, he finished third at the Austrian National Championship at Golf Club Gut Murstätten, 14 under par, three strokes behind winner Niklas Regner.

Following his graduation from Rice in spring 2026, Boandl turned professional.

== Amateur wins ==
- 2019 Austrian Juniors Tour 2
- 2021 Styrian Championship
- 2024 Argent Financial Classic, Bayou City Collegiate Classic (co-champion)
- 2025 Trinity Forest Invitational (co-champion)

== Team appearances ==
- European Boys' Team Championship (representing Austria): 2019
- European Amateur Team Championship (representing Austria): 2002
