= Vincent Norrman =

Swedish professional golfer (born 1997)

Personal information
- Full name: Vincent Oliver Norrman
- Nickname: The Candy Man
- Nationality: Sweden
- Born: 24 December 1997 (age 28) Stockholm, Sweden
- Height: 6 ft 1 in (1.85 m)
- Weight: 180 lb (82 kg; 13 st)
- Life partner: Frida Kinhult

Career
- Sport: Golf
- College: Georgia Southwestern State; Florida State University
- Turned professional: 2021
- Current tours: PGA Tour; European Tour
- Former tours: Korn Ferry Tour; Nordic Golf League
- Professional wins: 2
- Highest ranking: 71 (10 December 2023) (as of 25 October 2026)

Number of wins by tour
- PGA Tour: 1
- European Tour: 2

Best results in major championships
- Masters Tournament: DNP
- PGA Championship: CUT: 2024
- U.S. Open: CUT: 2023
- The Open Championship: CUT: 2024

Vincent Oliver Norrman (born 24 December 1997) is a Swedish professional golfer who plays on the PGA Tour and European Tour. He won the 2023 Barbasol Championship, as well as the 2023 Horizon Irish Open. As an amateur, he was part of the Swedish team winning the 2019 European Amateur Team Championship.

== Early life ==
Norrman was born on Christmas Eve and grew up in Stockholm, Sweden, with his parents Eva and Claes and his sister Vendela. He has represented Haninge Golf Club through his career and been a club mate of tournament professionals and European Tour winners Alex Norén and Kristoffer Broberg.

== Amateur career ==
He played on the Georgia Southwestern State Hurricanes golf team from 2016 to 2020 and for Florida State Seminoles in 2021, where he was named the Peach Belt Conference Men's Golf Player of the Year.

Norrman was part of the Swedish team winning the 2019 European Amateur Team Championship on home soil at Ljunghusen Golf Club in Sweden. The year after, he was again part of the Swedish team, this time at a reduced European Amateur Team Championship, with only four players in each team. Team Sweden earned the silver medal after losing in the final 2–1 against Germany, despite Norrman winning his match. On both occasions, Norrman finished tied seventh in the individual competition.

He was part of the winning International Team at the 2020 Arnold Palmer Cup held at Bay Hill Club, Florida, moved from July to December due to the COVID-19 pandemic.

His last tournament as an amateur was the first edition of the European Tour event Scandinavian Mixed, played at Vallda Golf & Country Club in Sweden, where he finished tied 12th among the men.

Norrman's highest World Amateur Golf Ranking was 4th.

== Professional career ==
Norrman turned professional in June 2021, became an affiliate member of the European Tour and was invited to play his first tournament as a professional at the BMW International Open at Golf Club München Eichenried in Munich, Germany, 24–27 June, where he finished tied fifth, earning €38,122. He scored a hole-in-one on a par-4 hole in the third round. A hole-in-one scored on the par-3 17th hole, would have won Norrman a car from the tournament sponsor, but instead he received a bottle of champagne. It was the second hole-in-one on a par-4 on the 2021 European Tour. With his achievement in the tournament, Norrman advanced from 1,016th to 658th on the Official World Golf Ranking and qualified for next week's tournament, the Dubai Duty Free Irish Open, where he made the cut. Two weeks later, at the Cazoo Open at the Celtic Manor Resort, Wales, Norrman tied the first round lead with a 7-under-par score of 64 and finished the tournament tied 10th.

In November 2021, he finished tied second at the Korn Ferry Tour Final Stage of Q-School to secure a minimum of twelve starts for the 2022 season. In his rookie season, after finishing tied third at the Simmons Bank Open in May, he came close to securing his maiden professional title in June, trailing the winner by one stroke at the Rex Hospital Open.

In August 2022, he qualified for the 2022–23 PGA Tour season by finishing 23rd on the Korn Ferry Tour regular-season points list.

In July 2023, Norrman claimed his first professional win by winning the Barbasol Championship, co-sanctioned by the PGA Tour and the European Tour, beating Nathan Kimsey in a playoff. In September the same year, he won the Horizon Irish Open, shooting a final-round 65 to win by one shot over Hurly Long for his second European Tour victory. Norrman was six shots from the lead after the third round and had to wait two hours after his final round until his win was decided.

== Personal life, awards ==
In 2023, Norrman received Elit Sign number 151 by the Swedish Golf Federation based on world ranking achievements.

Norrman is in a relationship with Swedish LPGA Tour player Frida Kinhult, who is the sister of professional golfer Marcus Kinhult.

Norrman has been nicknamed "The Candy Man" due to his employment in a sweet shop during his high school years in Sweden.

== Amateur wins ==
- 2018 Hurricane Invitational
- 2019 Hurricane Invitational, Aflac-Cougar Invitational, NSU Shark Invitational, Queens University Invitational (tied with Leo Johansson)
- 2020 Newberry College Invitational, Southeastern Collegiate
- 2021 Timuquana Collegiate

== Professional wins (2) ==
=== PGA Tour wins (1) ===
| No. | Date | Tournament | Winning score | Margin of victory | Runner-up |
|---|---|---|---|---|---|
| 1 | 16 Jul 2023 | Barbasol Championship^{1} | −22 (66-67-67-66=266) | Playoff | (England) Nathan Kimsey |

^{1}Co-sanctioned by the European Tour

PGA Tour playoff record (1–0)

| No. | Year | Tournament | Opponent | Result |
|---|---|---|---|---|
| 1 | 2023 | Barbasol Championship | (England) Nathan Kimsey | Won with par on first extra hole |

=== European Tour wins (2) ===
| No. | Date | Tournament | Winning score | Margin of victory | Runner-up |
|---|---|---|---|---|---|
| 1 | 16 Jul 2023 | Barbasol Championship^{1} | −22 (66-67-67-66=266) | Playoff | (England) Nathan Kimsey |
| 2 | 10 Sep 2023 | Horizon Irish Open | −14 (68-71-70-65=274) | 1 stroke | (Germany) Hurly Long |

^{1}Co-sanctioned by the PGA Tour

European Tour playoff record (1–0)

| No. | Year | Tournament | Opponent | Result |
|---|---|---|---|---|
| 1 | 2023 | Barbasol Championship | (England) Nathan Kimsey | Won with par on first extra hole |

== Results in major championships ==
| Tournament | 2023 | 2024 |
|---|---|---|
| Masters Tournament | | |
| PGA Championship | | CUT |
| U.S. Open | CUT | |
| The Open Championship | | CUT |

Did not play

CUT = missed the half-way cut

== Team appearances ==
Amateur

- European Amateur Team Championship (representing Sweden): 2019 (winners), 2020
- Arnold Palmer Cup (representing the International Team): 2020 (winners)

== See also ==
- 2022 Korn Ferry Tour Finals graduates
