= Daniel Rodrigues (golfer) =

Portuguese professional golfer (born 2002)

Personal information
- Full name: Daniel da Costa Rodrigues
- Nationality: Portugal
- Born: 14 September 2002 (age 24) Vila Nova de Gaia, Portugal

Career
- Sport: Golf
- College: Texas A&M University
- Turned professional: 2024
- Current tour: European Tour
- Former tour: Challenge Tour
- Professional wins: 1

Achievements and awards
- Southeastern Conference Freshman of the Year: 2021

Daniel da Costa Rodrigues (born 14 September 2002) is a Portuguese professional golfer and European Tour player. He was runner-up at the 2026 Turkish Airlines Open.

== Amateur career ==
Rodrigues enjoyed an impressive amateur career that saw him become the top amateur in Portugal. He won the 2019 Portuguese International Amateur Championship, was runner-up at the 2018 International Juniors of Belgium, and reached the quarter-finals of the Boys Amateur Championship in 2018 and 2019. He became a member of the Portuguese National Team in 2015 and represented his country in European and World championships.

In 2023, Rodrigues finished 4th at the European Amateur and fell to Ireland's Alex Maguire at the 23rd hole in the quarter-finals of the 128th Amateur Championship at Hillside.

Rodrigues played college golf at Texas A&M University 2020–2024 with the Texas A&M Aggies men's golf team, where he was named SEC Freshman of the Year in 2021.

== Professional career ==
Rodrigues joined the paid ranks in 2024. In 2025, he played on the Challenge Tour and came through all three stages of Qualifying School to earn a European Tour card for 2026.

In his rookie season, he held the 36-hole lead at the Crown Australian Open, and was runner-up at the 2026 Turkish Airlines Open, to finish 66th in the season rankings.

== Amateur wins ==
- 2018 Torneio do Circuito DriveTour Campeonato Jovens
- 2019 Portuguese International Amateur Championship, Campeonato Nacional Absoluto, Torneio do Circuito DriveTour Campeonato Jovens #1, Torneio do Circuito DriveTour Campeonato Jovens #2
- 2022 The Blessings Intercollegiate

== Professional wins (1) ==
=== Portugal Tour (1) ===
- 2025 NAU Morgado Open

== Team appearances ==
Amateur

- Jacques Léglise Trophy (representing Europe): 2018, 2019 (winners)
- European Boys' Team Championship (representing Portugal): 2018, 2019
- European Amateur Team Championship (representing Portugal): 2018, 2021, 2022, 2023
- St Andrews Trophy (representing Europe): 2022
- Eisenhower Trophy (representing Portugal): 2022

== See also ==
- 2025 European Tour Qualifying School graduates
