= Oïhan Guillamoundeguy =

French professional golfer (born 2004)

Personal information
- Nationality: France
- Born: 19 November 2004 (age 21) Soorts-Hossegor, France
- Height: 180 cm (5 ft 11 in)

Career
- Sport: Golf
- Turned professional: 2022
- Current tour: European Tour
- Former tours: Challenge Tour; Alps Tour
- Professional wins: 3

Number of wins by tour
- Challenge Tour: 1
- Other: 2

Oïhan Guillamoundeguy (born 19 November 2004) is a French professional golfer who plays on the European Tour. He won the 2025 Irish Challenge.

== Career ==
Guillamoundeguy was born in Soorts-Hossegor and started playing golf when he was eight years old. His first victory in a professional event came on the Alps Tour, when he won the 2022 Red Sea Little Venice Open by eight shots, while just a 17-year old-amateur. He turned professional in late 2022, and secured a second victory at the 2023 Abruzzo Alps Open, which helped him finish 4th in the Order of Merit and graduate to the 2024 Challenge Tour.

In his second season the Challenge Tour, he won the 2025 Irish Challenge, which helped him finish 5th in the season rankings and graduate to the European Tour for 2026.

== Amateur wins ==
- 2019 Grand Prix De Pau
- 2020 Grand Prix De Saint Donat, Grand Prix De Pau

== Professional wins (3) ==
=== Challenge Tour wins (1) ===
No.	Date	Tournament	Winning score	Margin of victory	Runner-up
1	10 Aug 2025	Irish Challenge	−11 (71-67-69-70=277)	3 strokes	(Switzerland) Ronan Kleu

=== Alps Tour wins (2) ===
No.	Date	Tournament	Winning score	Margin of victory	Runner-up
1	27 Feb 2022	Red Sea Little Venice Open (as an amateur)	−24 (65-64-63=192)	8 strokes	(Spain) Jorge Maicas
2	29 Jul 2023	Abruzzo Alps Open	−13 (65-66-66=197)	1 stroke	(Netherlands) Davey Porsius

== Team appearances ==
Amateur

- European Young Masters (representing France): 2020
- European Boys' Team Championship (representing France): 2021, 2022
- Jacques Léglise Trophy (representing the Continent of Europe): 2021 (winners)
- European Nations Cup – Copa Sotogrande (representing France): 2022

== See also ==
- 2025 Challenge Tour graduates
