= Fred Biondi =

Brazilian professional golfer (born 1977)

Personal information
- Nationality: Brazil
- Born: 16 December 2000 (age 25) São Paulo, Brazil
- Height: 1.80 m (5 ft 11 in)
- Weight: 64 kg (141 lb; 10.1 st)

Career
- Sport: Golf
- College: University of Florida
- Turned professional: 2023
- Current tour: European Tour
- Former tour: Korn Ferry Tour

Best results in major championships
- Masters Tournament: DNP
- PGA Championship: DNP
- U.S. Open: CUT: 2022
- The Open Championship: DNP

Frederico Biondi Figueiredo (born 16 December 2000) is a Brazilian professional golfer. He played collegiate golf at the University of Florida, where he won the individual title at the 2023 NCAA Division I Men's Golf Championship.

== Personal life ==
Biondi was born in São Paulo, Brazil. He plays golf since he was 3. At the age of 14, he moved to the United States, where he attended Morningside Academy in Port Saint Lucie, Florida. He played on the golf team. He earned a bachelor's degree in finance in 2022 from the University of Florida.

His younger brother, Leo (Kyno), is a professional e-sports competitor in the United States.

His father, Fernando Figueiredo is a well known advertiser in Brazil and USA with his company, Bullet, and his mother, Maricota Biondi, is a chef and baker and owner of Maká Macaron.

In addition to his native Portuguese, Biondi is also fluent in English and Spanish.

== Amateur wins ==
- 2017 Florida Junior Amateur Championship
- 2017 Florida Player of the Year.
- 2020 Florida Amateur Public Links Championship, Fall Elite Series – Mark Bostick at UF
- 2021 Florida Amateur
- 2022 Florida Gators Invitational, Calusa Cup
- 2023 Sea Best Invitational, Augusta Haskins Award Invite, NCAA Division I Championship

== Professional career ==
In June 2023, Biondi turned professional and gained membership on the Korn Ferry Tour thanks to his second-place ranking in the PGA Tour University program. By turning professional, he forfeited his invitations to the 2023 U.S. Open and the 2024 Masters Tournament. His first Korn Ferry Tour event was the BMW Charity Pro-Am, where he made the cut and finished tied for 31st place.

In September 2023, Biondi played in his first PGA Tour event, receiving a sponsors invite to compete in the Fortinet Championship, where he missed the cut. For the rest of 2023, he played in three more PGA Tour events, making the cut twice, with his best result being a T13 finish at the Bermuda Championship.

== Results in major championships ==
Tournament	2022
Masters Tournament	
PGA Championship	
U.S. Open	CUT
The Open Championship	

Did not play

CUT = missed the half-way cut

== Team appearances ==
Amateur

- Arnold Palmer Cup (representing International team): 2022

== See also ==
- 2025 European Tour Qualifying School graduates
