= Dutch Futures =

Tournament information
- Location: Spijk, Netherlands
- Established: 2007
- Course: The Dutch
- Par: 71
- Length: 6,925 yards (6,332 m)
- Tour: Challenge Tour
- Format: Stroke play
- Prize fund: €300,000
- Month played: August

Tournament record score
- Aggregate: 269 Filippo Celli (2025)
- To par: −17 Nicolas Colsaerts (2009)

Current champion
- (Italy) Filippo Celli

Final champion
- Location in the Netherlands

The Dutch Futures was a golf tournament on the Challenge Tour from 2007 to 2009. It was played at the Golfclub Houtrak in Halfweg, the Netherlands.

In February 2025, it was announced that the event would return in August that year, the first time the event had been played in 16 years.

== Winners ==
Year	Winner	Score	To par	Margin of victory	Runner(s)-up
2025	(Italy) Filippo Celli	269	−15	2 strokes	(Germany) Hurly Long
2010–2024: No tournament
2009	(Belgium) Nicolas Colsaerts	271	−17	4 strokes	(Scotland) Andrew McArthur (France) Julien Quesne
2008	(Netherlands) Taco Remkes	275	−13	Playoff	(Denmark) Jeppe Huldahl
2007	(Scotland) Peter Whiteford	275	−13	2 strokes	(France) François Delamontagne
