= Jesper Svensson (golfer) =

Swedish professional golfer (born 1996)

Personal information
- Full name: Bo Jesper Svensson
- Nationality: Sweden
- Born: 14 March 1996 (age 30) Uppsala, Sweden
- Height: 6 ft 3 in (1.91 m)
- Life partner: Angelica Damberg

Career
- Sport: Golf
- College: Campbell University
- Turned professional: 2019
- Current tours: PGA Tour; European Tour
- Former tours: Challenge Tour; Nordic Golf League
- Professional wins: 3
- Highest ranking: 89 (12 January 2025) (as of 25 October 2026)

Number of wins by tour
- European Tour: 1
- Challenge Tour: 1
- Other: 1

Best results in major championships
- Masters Tournament: DNP
- PGA Championship: T53: 2024
- U.S. Open: DNP
- The Open Championship: T16: 2025

Achievements and awards
- Big South Golfer of the Year: 2017, 2019
- Sir Henry Cotton Rookie of the Year: 2024

Bo Jesper Svensson (Swedish: [ˈjɛ̌sːpɛr svɛnsɔn]; born 14 March 1996) is a Swedish professional golfer who plays on the European Tour and PGA Tour. In 2024, he won the Porsche Singapore Classic and was runner-up three times to become the European Tour Rookie of the Year.

== Early life and amateur career ==
Svensson was born in Uppsala, Sweden. As a junior golfer, he won both the Swedish Junior Matchplay Championship at Vasatorp Golf Club, and the Swedish Junior Strokeplay Championship at Sollentuna Golf Club.

He represented Sweden at the European Amateur Team Championship in 2017 and 2018, and played in the Duke of York Young Champions Trophy at Royal Aberdeen Golf Club in Scotland, where he finished 13th overall. He placed third at the 2015 Campenato de Castellón in Spain.

Svensson played college golf at Campbell University in Buies Creek, North Carolina, between 2015 and 2019. He majored in Business Administration and was Big South Conference Golfer of the Year in 2017 and 2019. He won four tournaments, including the Big South Championship twice, the first of which he won with a 14-under-par 202 (67-66-69), breaking a 10-year-old record of 204 set by Dustin Johnson of Coastal Carolina.

== Professional career ==
Svensson turned professional in the summer of 2019 and joined the Nordic Golf League, where he won the 2020 Race to Himmerland, the season finale in Denmark. In 2021, he was runner-up in the season opener, the Lindbytvätten Grand Opening, and again runner-up at the Stockholm Trophy in June, one stroke behind Jesper Kennegård.

In August 2021, he was runner-up at the Finnish Challenge on the Challenge Tour, two strokes behind winner Marcus Helligkilde of Denmark. The following week, he took a one-stroke lead into day three of the Made in Esbjerg Challenge, another Challenge Tour event, where he ultimately finished T10. The results propelled him into the top 45 of Challenge Tour Rankings, earning exemption in category 3c for the fall tournaments on the tour.

Svensson was again in contention at the Empordà Challenge in Spain. After a run of seven birdies in the final round he was co-leader with Julien Brun at the 16th hole, but a bogey-bogey finish sent him down the leaderboard to a tie for 3rd. The result lifted him to 33rd place in the Challenge Tour Rankings, approaching a spot in the top 20 that secures a European Tour card for 2022, with two tournaments left of the season.

Svensson finished the 2021 Challenge Tour season ranked 36th on the rankings, enabling him a few starts on the 2022 European Tour where his best finish was a T19 in the Hero Open at Fairmont St Andrews.

In 2023, Svensson claimed his maiden Challenge Tour win at the 2023 B-NL Challenge Trophy at the Twentsche Golfclub in the Netherlands, after taking the outright lead with a birdie on the 17th before parring the final hole. He was also runner-up at the Andalucía Challenge de Cádiz and the Swiss Challenge, to finish the season 5th in the rankings and graduate to the European Tour.

=== 2024: European Tour Rookie of the Year ===
In December 2023, in his second start as a full member on the European Tour, he led the Investec South African Open Championship at the halfway stage, ultimately finishing runner-up.

In February 2024, Svensson again finished second in a European Tour event, this time joint runner-up at the Bahrain Championship, two strokes behind winner Dylan Frittelli, after holding the lead with eight holes to go. In March, Svensson claimed his first European Tour win at the Porsche Singapore Classic. After tying the course record 63 in the last round, he won in a sudden-death playoff over Kiradech Aphibarnrat playing the par-5 18th hole three times.

Svensson played in his first major championship in May 2024, the PGA Championship at Valhalla Golf Club in Louisville, Kentucky, United States, through invitation. In July, Svensson qualified for his second major championship, The Open Championship at Royal Troon Golf Club, via his position on the 2024 Race to Dubai Rankings.

Svensson finished the season 10th on the Race to Dubai rankings, earning a PGA Tour card for the 2025 season. He was also named the Sir Henry Cotton Rookie of the Year for the 2024 season.

=== PGA Tour ===
Svensson finished tied 10th in his first event as a PGA Tour member, the Sony Open in Hawaii, and shot a final round 66 to finish tied 16th at the 2025 Open Championship, his career-best finish in a major up to that point.Hagfeldt, Tomas (20 July 2025). "Svenssons supersöndag". Svensk Golf (in Swedish). Svensson shot an opening round 66 at the Bank of Utah Championship to share the overnight lead, and despite a final day ten-under 62 he ultimately finished tied 15th."Jesper Svensson Ties for Lead After Impressive PGA Tour Round". Sweden Herald. 24 October 2025.

In 2026, he recorded top-10 finishes at the Puerto Rico Open and CJ Cup Byron Nelson. He later lead the RBC Canadian Open during the 3rd round until a double bogey on the penultimate hole, and ultimately finished tied for fourth. With his finish, he qualified for his third straight Open Championship entry.

== Awards and honors ==
In 2024, he received Elit Sign number 153 by the Swedish Golf Federation based on world ranking achievements.

== Amateur wins ==
- 2014 Swedish Junior Matchplay Championship, Skandia Tour Riks #4, Titleist FootJoy Junior Open
- 2015 Skandia Tour Elit #2
- 2016 Swedish Junior Strokeplay Championship
- 2017 Big South Championship
- 2018 Golfweek Program Challenge, Old Dominion OBX Collegiate
- 2019 Big South Championship

== Professional wins (3) ==
=== European Tour wins (1) ===
| No. | Date | Tournament | Winning score | Margin of victory | Runner-up |
|---|---|---|---|---|---|
| 1 | 24 Mar 2024 | Porsche Singapore Classic | −17 (68-73-67-63=271) | Playoff | (Thailand) Kiradech Aphibarnrat |

European Tour playoff record (1–0)

| No. | Year | Tournament | Opponent | Result |
|---|---|---|---|---|
| 1 | 2024 | Porsche Singapore Classic | (Thailand) Kiradech Aphibarnrat | Won with par on third extra hole |

=== Challenge Tour wins (1) ===
| No. | Date | Tournament | Winning score | Margin of victory | Runner-up |
|---|---|---|---|---|---|
| 1 | 21 May 2023 | B-NL Challenge Trophy | −14 (69-68-67-66=270) | 1 stroke | (South Africa) Brandon Stone |

Challenge Tour playoff record (0–2)

| No. | Year | Tournament | Opponent(s) | Result |
|---|---|---|---|---|
| 1 | 2023 | Andalucía Challenge de Cádiz | (France) Clément Berardo, (Italy) Filippo Celli, (England) Sam Hutsby, (Denmark) Nicolai Kristensen, (France) Julien Sale | Hutsby won with par on third extra hole Berardo, Celli, Kristensen and Svensson eliminated by birdie on first hole |
| 2 | 2023 | Swiss Challenge | (Sweden) Adam Blommé | Lost to bogey on first extra hole |

=== Nordic Golf League wins (1) ===
| No. | Date | Tournament | Winning score | Margin of victory | Runners-up |
|---|---|---|---|---|---|
| 1 | 4 Oct 2020 | Race to HimmerLand | −16 (64-67-69=200) | 3 strokes | (Sweden) Martin Eriksson, (Denmark) Lasse Jensen |

== Results in major championships ==
| Tournament | 2024 | 2025 | 2026 |
|---|---|---|---|
| Masters Tournament | | | |
| PGA Championship | T53 | | |
| U.S. Open | | | |
| The Open Championship | CUT | T16 | 78 |

Did not play

CUT = missed the half-way cut
"T" = tied

== Results in The Players Championship ==
| Tournament | 2025 |
|---|---|
| The Players Championship | T42 |

"T" indicates a tie for a place

== Team appearances ==
Amateur

- European Amateur Team Championship (representing Sweden): 2017, 2018

== See also ==
- 2023 Challenge Tour graduates
- 2024 Race to Dubai dual card winners
