= Roma Alps LETAS Open =

Tournament information
- Location: Rome, Lazio, Italy
- Established: 2021
- Course: Golf Club Parco de' Medici
- Par: 72
- Length: 6,988 yards (6,390 m)
- Tours: Alps Tour; LET Access Series (2021)
- Format: Stroke play
- Prize fund: €40,000
- Month played: July
- Final year: 2022

Tournament record score
- Aggregate: 196 Gregorio De Leo (2022)
- To par: −20 as above

Final champion
- (Italy) Gregorio De Leo

Location map
- Location in Italy Location in Rome

The Roma Alps LETAS Open was a professional golf tournament played at Golf Club Parco de' Medici in Rome, Italy. In 2021 the tournament was a mixed event with the Alps Tour and LET Access Series.

== Format ==
The inaugural installment was a mixed event, where female and male players competed for the same trophy and prize fund, while teeing off from different yardages. It was thew second such event following the Saint-Malo Golf Mixed Open in 2019.

The best female player was Italian amateur Alessia Nobilio, who finished tied third, two strokes behind the winner.

== Winners ==
| Year | Tour(s) (Note: ALP − Alps Tour; LETAS − LET Access Series.) | Winner | Score | To par | Margin of victory | Runner(s)-up |
Roma Alps Open
| 2022 | ALP | (Italy) Gregorio De Leo | 196 | −20 | 3 strokes | (Republic of Ireland) Gary Hurley (Italy) Stefano Mazzoli |
Roma Alps LETAS Open
| 2021 (Note: Mixed event) | ALP, LETAS | (France) Xavier Poncelet | 199 | −17 | 1 stroke | (Scotland) Ryan Lumsden |

== See also ==
- Hauts de France – Pas de Calais Golf Open
