= 2022 Alps Tour =

Golf tour season

2022 Alps Tour season
- Duration: 22 February 2022 – 8 October 2022
- Number of official events: 17 (Note: One further tournament was scheduled but was cancelled.)
- Most wins: (Italy) Gregorio De Leo (3)
- Order of Merit: (Italy) Gregorio De Leo

The 2022 Alps Tour was the 22nd season of the Alps Tour, a third-tier golf tour recognised by the European Tour.

== Schedule ==
The following table lists official events during the 2022 season.

Date	Tournament	Host country	Purse (€)	Winner (Note: The number in brackets after each winner's name is the number of Alps Tour events they had won up to and including that tournament. It is rare for someone to accumulate many wins on the Alps Tour as success at this level usually leads to promotion to the Challenge Tour.)	OWGR points
24 Feb	Ein Bay Open	Egypt	40,000	(Italy) Stefano Mazzoli (3)	4
27 Feb	Red Sea Little Venice Open	Egypt	40,000	(France) Oïhan Guillamoundeguy (a) (1)	4
6 Mar	New Giza Open	Egypt	40,000	(Portugal) Tomás Bessa Guimarães (1)	4
18 Mar	Winter Series Terre dei Consoli	Italy	35,000	(France) Adrien Pendaries (1)	4
23 Mar	Winter Series Golf Nazionale	Italy	35,000	(Switzerland) Mathias Eggenberger (1)	4
15 Apr	Abruzzo Alps Open	Italy	40,000	(Spain) Manuel Morugán (1)	4
6 May	Molinetto Alps Open	Italy	40,000	(Netherlands) Koen Kouwenaar (1)	4
14 May	Gösser Open	Austria	42,500	(Austria) Markus Brier (3)	4
27 May	Memorial Giorgio Bordoni	Italy	40,000	(Italy) Gregorio De Leo (1)	4
~~4 Jun~~	Open de Saint François Region Guadeloupe	Guadeloupe	–	Cancelled	–
12 Jun	Open de la Mirabelle d'Or	France	40,000	(France) Tom Vaillant (a) (1)	4
18 Jun	Aravell Golf Open	Spain	40,000	(France) Tom Vaillant (a) (2)	4
25 Jun	Alps de Andalucía	Spain	40,000	(Republic of Ireland) Gary Hurley (1)	4
2 Jul	Hauts de France – Pas de Calais Golf Open	France	40,000	(Netherlands) Davey Porsius (1)	4
9 Jul	Alps de Las Castillas	Spain	40,000	(Italy) Gregorio De Leo (2)	4
16 Jul	Fred Olsen Alps de La Gomera	Spain	40,000	(Netherlands) Vince van Veen (1)	4
23 Jul	Roma Alps Open	Italy	40,000	(Italy) Gregorio De Leo (3)	4
30 Sep	Castelconturbia Alps Open	Italy	40,000	(England) Ben Schmidt (1)	0.79
8 Oct	Emilia-Romagna Alps Tour Grand Final	Italy	50,000	(Republic of Ireland) Jonathan Yates (1)	0.59

== Order of Merit ==
The Order of Merit was based on tournament results during the season, calculated using a points-based system. The top five players on the Order of Merit (not otherwise exempt) earned status to play on the 2023 Challenge Tour.

Position	Player	Points	Status earned
1	(Italy) Gregorio De Leo	39,936	Promoted to Challenge Tour
2	(France) Julien Sale	33,858	Promoted to Challenge Tour
3	(France) Tom Vaillant (a)	32,860	Promoted to Challenge Tour
4	(Italy) Stefano Mazzoli	29,463	Promoted to Challenge Tour
5	(Republic of Ireland) Gary Hurley	26,786	Qualified for European Tour (Top 25 in Q School)
6	(Netherlands) Vince van Veen	24,224	Promoted to Challenge Tour
7	(Netherlands) Koen Kouwenaar	22,934	
8	(Portugal) Tomás Bessa Guimarães	22,462	
9	(Netherlands) Davey Porsius	21,504	
10	(Republic of Ireland) Jonathan Yates	20,629	
