= Nathan Kimsey =

English professional golfer

Personal information
- Nationality: England
- Born: 21 March 1993 (age 33) Boston, England
- Height: 5 ft 10 in (1.78 m)
- Weight: 90 kg (200 lb; 14 st)

Career
- Sport: Golf
- Turned professional: 2013
- Current tour: European Tour
- Former tours: Challenge Tour; PGA EuroPro Tour
- Professional wins: 2

Number of wins by tour
- Challenge Tour: 2

Best results in major championships
- Masters Tournament: DNP
- PGA Championship: DNP
- U.S. Open: CUT: 2026
- The Open Championship: T40: 2025

Achievements and awards
- Challenge Tour Rankings winner: 2022

Nathan Kimsey (born 21 March 1993) is an English professional golfer. In 2022, he won the Rolex Challenge Tour Grand Final and the Challenge Tour Rankings.

== Amateur career ==
Kimsey, from Woodhall Spa Golf Club in Lincolnshire, were an integral part of the England squad between 2010 and 2013. Highlights of his amateur career included selection for the Great Britain & Ireland 2011 Jacques Léglise Trophy, 2012 St Andrews Trophy and 2013 Walker Cup teams, and he formed part of the victorious England side at the 2013 European Amateur Team Championship in Denmark.

He won the 2011 Peter McEvoy Trophy, and in 2013 he was runner-up at the St Andrews Links Trophy and won the Terra Cotta Invitational in Florida. At the Men's Home Internationals he became the first England player in 15 years to win all six matches, following which he went on to be a semi-finalist in the English Amateur.

== Professional career ==
Kimsey turned professional in 2013 and spent two years on the Challenge Tour, before dropping down to the EuroPro Tour for the 2016 season. At the end of the year, he earned his European Tour card by becoming only the second player in history to win Qualifying School Final Stage after coming all the way through from Stage One, a total of 14 rounds of golf.

In his rookie European Tour season, he finished top-10 at the Commercial Bank Qatar Masters and Australian PGA Championship, but returned to the Challenge Tour for 2018.

In 2022, Kimsey won the Le Vaudreuil Golf Challenge and the Rolex Challenge Tour Grand Final to become the Challenge Tour Rankings winner and earn promotion to the European Tour.

== Amateur wins ==
- 2011 Peter McEvoy Trophy
- 2012 Darwin Salver
- 2013 Terra Cotta Invitational

== Professional wins (2) ==
=== Challenge Tour wins (2) ===
Legend
Tour Championships (1)
Other Challenge Tour (1)

No.	Date	Tournament	Winning score	Margin of victory	Runner(s)-up
1	10 Jul 2022	Le Vaudreuil Golf Challenge	−14 (68-66-69-71=274)	Playoff	(France) Robin Sciot-Siegrist
2	6 Nov 2022	Rolex Challenge Tour Grand Final	−9 (70-73-66-70=279)	1 stroke	(South Africa) Bryce Easton, (England) John Parry

Challenge Tour playoff record (1–0)

No.	Year	Tournament	Opponent	Result
1	2022	Le Vaudreuil Golf Challenge	(France) Robin Sciot-Siegrist	Won with birdie on fourth extra hole

== Playoff record ==
PGA Tour playoff record (0–1)

No.	Year	Tournament	Opponent	Result
1	2023	Barbasol Championship	(Sweden) Vincent Norrman	Lost to par on first extra hole

European Tour playoff record (0–1)

No.	Year	Tournament	Opponent	Result
1	2023	Barbasol Championship	(Sweden) Vincent Norrman	Lost to par on first extra hole

== Results in major championships ==
Tournament	2025	2026
Masters Tournament		
PGA Championship		
U.S. Open		CUT
The Open Championship	T40	

Did not play

CUT = missed the half-way cut
"T" = tied

== Team appearances ==
Amateur

- Jacques Léglise Trophy (representing Great Britain and Ireland): 2011 (winners)
- Men's Home Internationals (representing England): 2012
- St Andrews Trophy (representing Great Britain and Ireland): 2012
- European Amateur Team Championship (representing England): 2013 (winners)
- Walker Cup (representing Great Britain & Ireland): 2013

== See also ==
- 2016 European Tour Qualifying School graduates
- 2022 Challenge Tour graduates
- 2025 European Tour Qualifying School graduates
