= 2021 European Amateur Team Championship =

Golf competition

Tournament information
- Dates: 6–10 July 2021
- Location: Caldes de Malavella, Spain; 41.857°N 2.763°E
- Course: PGA Catalunya
- Organized by: European Golf Association
- Format: Qualification round: 36 holes stroke play Knock-out match-play

Statistics
- Par: 71
- Field: 13 teams 78 players

Champion
- Denmark; Christoffer Bring, Hamish Brown, Sebastian Friedrichsen, August Thor Høst, Frederik Kjettrup, Søren Broholt Lind
- Qualification round: 707 (−3); Final match: 5 1/2–1 1/2
- Location in Europe Location in Spain

The 2021 European Amateur Team Championship took place 6–10 July at PGA Catalunya in Spain. It was the 38th men's golf European Amateur Team Championship. The event was originally intended to be played at Vasatorp Golf Club in Sweden but was moved because of travel restriction concerns.

== Format ==
Each team consisted of six players. On the first two days each player played 18 holes of stroke play each day. The lowest five scores from each team’s six players counted to the team total each day.

The eight best teams formed flight A, in knock-out match-play over the following three days. The teams were seeded based on their positions after the stroke play. The first placed team was drawn to play the quarter-final against the eight placed team, the second against the seventh, the third against the sixth and the fourth against the fifth. Teams were allowed to use six players during the team matches, selecting four of them in the two morning foursome games and five players in to the afternoon single games. Teams knocked out after the quarter-finals played one foursome game and four single games in each of their remaining matches. Extra holes were played in games that were all square after 18 holes. However, if the result of the team match was already decided, games were declared halved.

The teams outside the top eight in the stroke-play stage formed flight B, also played knock-out match-play, but with one foursome game and four single games in each match, to decide their final positions.

The three last placed nation teams are normally moved to the Division 2 championship for next year. However, because of the reduced format of the championship due to COVID 19-restrictions, no nations were relegated.

== Teams ==
13 national teams contested the event. England, Scotland and Wales did not compete.

| Country | Players |
|---|---|
| Austria | Christoph Bleier, Luca Denk, Maximilian Lechner, Lukas Pany, Namu Sarmini, Maximilian Steinlechner |
| Belgium | Liam Bentein, Matthis Besard, Jean de Wouters d'Oplinter, Adrien Dumont de Chassart, James Meyer de Beco, Max Peerbooms |
| Denmark | Christoffer Bring, Hamish Brown, Sebastian Friedrichsen, August Thor Høst, Frederik Kjettrup, Søren Broholt Lind |
| France | Clément Charmasson, Tom Gueant, Paul Margolis, Nicolas Muller, Julien Sale, Tom Vaillant |
| Germany | Nick Bachem, Jannik De Bruyn, Wolfgang Glawe, Marc Hammer, Matti Schmid, Timo Vahlenkamp |
| Iceland | Hlynur Bergsson, Sverrir Haraldsson, Aron Snær Júlíusson, Kristófer Karl Karlsson, Hákon Örn Magnússon, Dagbjartur Sigurbrandsson |
| Ireland | Marc Boucher, Hugh Foley, Matthew McClean, Robert Moran, Mark Power, Caolan Rafferty |
| Italy | Pietro Bovari, Riccardo Bregoli, Davide Buchi, Filippo Celli, Gregorio De Leo, Giovanni Manzoni |
| Netherlands | Dario Antonisse, Bob Geurts, Jerry Ji, Benjamin Reuter, Kiet Van Der Weele, Nordin Van Tilburg |
| Portugal | Vasco Alves, Pedro Clare, Pedro Cruz Silva, Pedro Lencart, Joâo Pinto, Daniel Rodrigues |
| Spain | Alvaro Hernández Cabezuela, Eugenio Chacarra, Luis Masaveu, Joel Moscatel, Álvaro Mueller-Baumgart, David Puig |
| Sweden | Ludvig Åberg, Gustav Andersson, David Nyfjäll, Pontus Nyholm, Hugo Townsend, Adam Wallin |
| Switzerland | Loïc Ettlin, Robert Foley, Nicola Gerhardsen, Mauro Gilardi, Cédric Gugler, Ronan Kleu |

== Winners ==
Host nation Spain led the opening 36-hole stroke-play competition with a 17-under-par score of 693, four strokes ahead of Sweden with defending champion team Germany in third place a further four strokes behind.

There was no official award for the lowest individual score, but individual leader was Eugenio Chacarra, Spain, with a 9-under-par score of 133, one stroke ahead of Pontus Nyholm, Sweden and Jean de Wouters d'Oplinter, Belgium.

Team Denmark won the gold medal, earning their first title, beating team France in the final 5 1/2–1 1/2.

Team Belgium earned the bronze on third place, after beating Spain 6–1 in the bronze match.

== Results ==
Qualification round

Team standings

| Place | Country | Score | To par |
|---|---|---|---|
| 1 | Spain | 354-339=693 | −17 |
| 2 | Sweden | 350-347=697 | −13 |
| 3 | Germany | 350-351=701 | −9 |
| T4 | France * | 343-359=702 | −8 |
| T4 | Netherlands | 349-353=702 | −8 |
| 6 | Belgium | 352-354=706 | −4 |
| 7 | Denmark | 352-355=707 | −3 |
| 8 | Austria | 360-351=711 | +1 |
| 9 | Portugal | 357-355=712 | +2 |
| 10 | Switzerland | 354-359=713 | +3 |
| 11 | Italy | 360-355=715 | +5 |
| 12 | Iceland | 359-363=722 | +12 |
| 13 | Ireland | 367-361=728 | +18 |

* Note: In the event of a tie the order was determined by the best total of the two non-counting scores of the two rounds.

Individual leaders

| Place | Player | Country | Score | To par |
|---|---|---|---|---|
| 1 | Eugenio Chacarra | Spain | 67-66=133 | −9 |
| T2 | Pontus Nyholm | Sweden | 66-68=134 | −8 |
| T2 | Jean de Wouters d'Oplinter | Belgium | 66-68=134 | −8 |
| 4 | Christoph Bleier | Austria | 67-68=135 | −7 |
| 5 | Maximilian Steinlechner | Austria | 68-68=136 | −6 |
| T6 | Ludvig Åberg | Sweden | 68-69=137 | −5 |
| T6 | Paul Margolis | France | 67-70=137 | −5 |
| T6 | Joel Moscatel | Spain | 70-67=137 | −5 |
| T6 | David Nyfjäll | Sweden | 67-70=137 | −5 |
| T6 | David Puig | Spain | 72-65=137 | −5 |
| T6 | Nordin van Tilburg | Netherlands | 68-69=137 | −5 |

Note: There was no official award for the lowest individual score.

Flight A

Bracket

Quarter finals
Spain | 5
Austria | 2
France | 4
Netherlands | 3
Belgium | 4
Germany | 3
Denmark | 4
Sweden | 3

Semi finals
France | 4
Spain | 3
Denmark | 4
Belgium | 3

Final
Denmark | 5.5
France | 1.5
Bronze match
Belgium | 6
Spain | 1

Elimination matches
Austria | 3
Netherlands | 2
Germany | 3.5
Sweden | 1.5

Match for 5th place
Austria | 4
Germany | 1
Match for 7th place
Netherlands | 4
Sweden | 1

Final games

| Denmark | France |
| 5.5 | 1.5 |
| C. Bring / S. Broholt Lind 2 holes | N. Muller / J. Sale |
| A.T. Høst / S. Friedrichtsen 1 hole | P. Margolis / C. Charmasson |
| Frederik Kjetterup AS * | Tom Vaillant AS * |
| August Thor Høst 5 & 3 | Julien Sale |
| Christoffer Bring 4 & 3 | Tom Guent |
| Hamish Brown AS * | Paul Margolis AS * |
| Søren Broholt Lind AS * | Clémont Charmasson AS * |

* Note: Game declared halved, since team match already decided.

Flight B

Bracket

Round 1
Ireland | 4
Iceland | 1
Italy | 3
Switzerland | 2

Round 2
Ireland | 3.5
Portugal | 1.5
Italy
Direct to round 3

Match for 9th place
Italy | 3
Ireland | 2

Elimination match
Switzerland | 3
Iceland | 2

Match for 11th place
Switzerland | 4
Portugal | 1

Final standings

| Place | Country |
|---|---|
| 1st place, gold medalist(s) | Denmark |
| 2nd place, silver medalist(s) | France |
| 3rd place, bronze medalist(s) | Belgium |
| 4 | Spain |
| 5 | Austria |
| 6 | Germany |
| 7 | Netherlands |
| 8 | Sweden |
| 9 | Italy |
| 10 | Ireland |
| 11 | Switzerland |
| 12 | Portugal |
| 13 | Iceland |
