= Ben Schmidt =

English professional golfer (born 2002)

Personal information
- Nationality: England
- Born: 30 July 2002 (age 24) Tankersley, South Yorkshire, England

Career
- Sport: Golf
- Turned professional: 2021
- Current tours: European Tour; LIV Golf
- Former tours: Challenge Tour; Alps Tour
- Professional wins: 1

Ben Schmidt (born 30 July 2002) is an English professional golfer who plays on the European Tour and as a reserve on LIV Golf.

== Early life and amateur career ==
Schmidt grew up in Tankersley, South Yorkshire, and started taking golf seriously at the age of 12. He had a stellar amateur career.

In 2019, he won both the Carris Trophy and the Brabazon Trophy, the English boys' and men's open amateur stroke play championship, respectively, in the same calendar year, only the fourth after Patrick Hine (1949), Sandy Lyle (1975) and Peter Baker (1985). At 16, he became the youngest-ever winner of the latter event, logging rounds of 69-64-69-69 to win by five strokes ahead of Harry Hall in second.

In 2020, Schmidt won the New South Wales Amateur Championship in Australia.

He won the 2019 Men's Home Internationals with England, and represented Great Britain & Ireland at the 2019 Jacques Léglise Trophy and in the 2021 Walker Cup at Seminole Golf Club in Florida.

== Professional career ==
Schmidt turned professional in 2021 and joined the Challenge Tour. In 2022, he played on the Alps Tour, where he secured his first professional victory at the Castelconturbia Alps Open in Italy.

Schmidt played on the Challenge Tour in 2023 and 2024, with a best finish of tied 4th at both the Kaskáda Golf Challenge and Hainan Open in 2024, before earning a European Tour card for 2025 at Q-School.

In his rookie European Tour season, Schmidt finished 3rd at the Danish Golf Championship and ended the season 69th in the rankings to comfortably keep his card.

In 2026, he was named as a replacement for an injured Lee Westwood on the Majesticks team in the LIV Golf League.

== Amateur wins ==
- 2018 Lee Westwood Trophy, English Boys County Champion of Champions
- 2019 Brabazon Trophy, Sir Henry Cooper Junior Masters, Carris Trophy
- 2020 New South Wales Amateur Championship

== Professional wins (1) ==
=== Alps Tour wins (1) ===
No.	Date	Tournament	Winning score	Margin of victory	Runner-up
1	30 Sep 2022	Castelconturbia Alps Open	−15 (70-64-67=201)	1 stroke	(Netherlands) Vince van Veen

== Team appearances ==
Amateur

- Men's Home Internationals (representing England): 2019 (winners)
- Jacques Léglise Trophy (representing Great Britain & Ireland): 2019
- European Boys' Team Championship (representing England): 2019
- Walker Cup (representing Great Britain & Ireland): 2021

== See also ==
- List of Great Britain and Ireland Walker Cup golfers
- 2024 European Tour Qualifying School graduates
