= Sam Hutsby =

English golfer (born 1988)

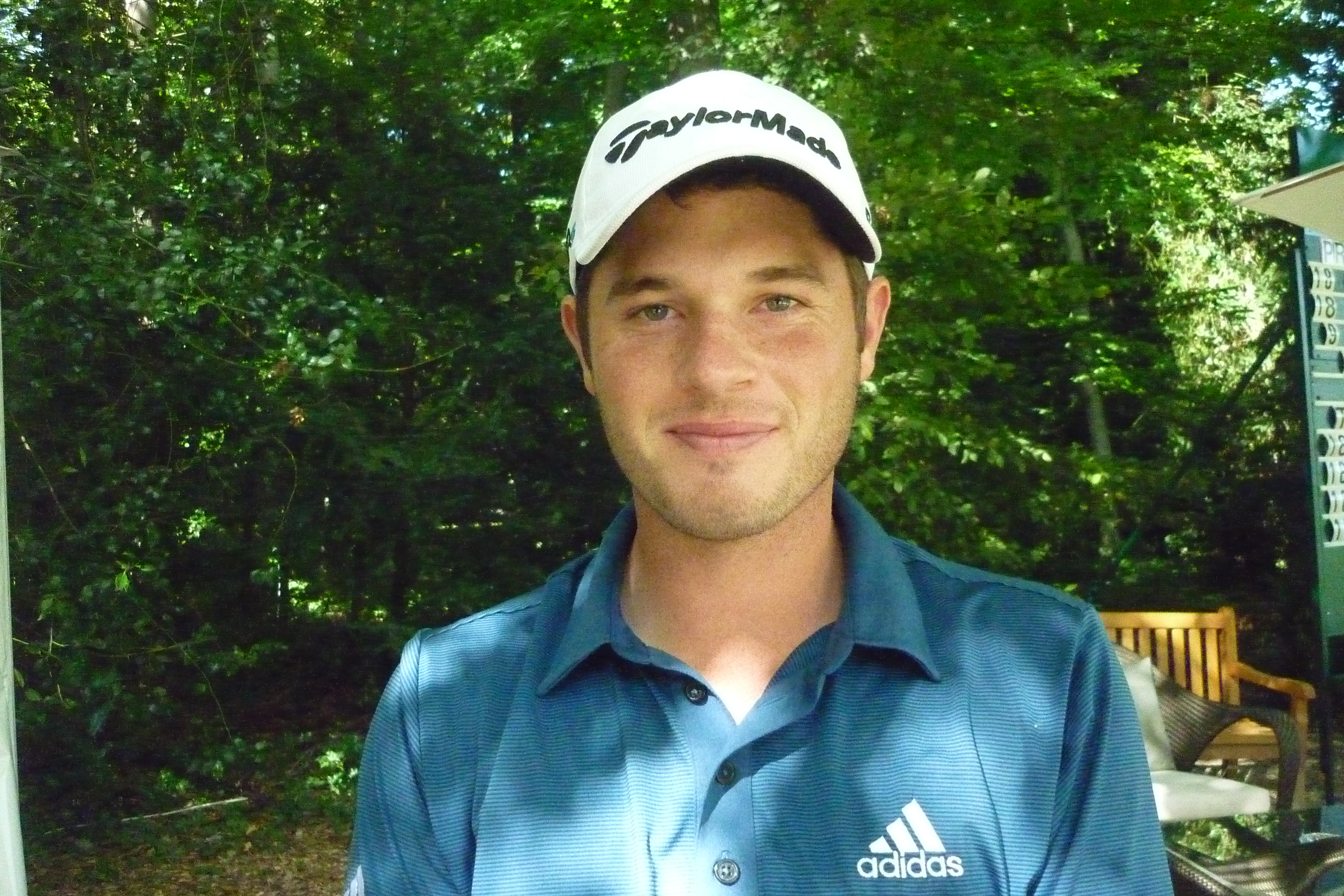
- Hutsby at the 2014 Rolex Trophy

Personal information
- Full name: Samuel Michael Thomas Hutsby
- Nationality: England
- Born: 29 October 1988 (age 38) Portsmouth, Hampshire, England
- Height: 5 ft 9 in (1.75 m)
- Weight: 154 lb (70 kg; 11.0 st)

Career
- Sport: Golf
- Turned professional: 2009
- Current tour: European Tour
- Former tours: Challenge Tour; Clutch Pro Tour
- Professional wins: 3

Number of wins by tour
- Challenge Tour: 2
- Other: 1

Best results in major championships
- Masters Tournament: DNP
- PGA Championship: DNP
- U.S. Open: DNP
- The Open Championship: CUT: 2024

Samuel Michael Thomas Hutsby (born 29 October 1988) is an English professional golfer.

== Amateur career ==
Hutsby had a successful amateur career, working under the tutelage of golf coach Sam Torrance until they broke up in June 2008. In 2009 he lost the finals of The Amateur Championship at Formby Golf Club to Matteo Manassero, the youngest winner ever. He won the Spanish Amateur in 2006, which allowed him to play in the Spanish Open, and lost the Spanish finals to Reinier Saxton in 2009.

In April 2009, Hutsby was 6th on the World Amateur Golf Ranking, the highest ranked English player at that time.

Hutsby was selected to play in the 2009 Walker Cup. He lost his first singles, winning the Sunday foursomes with Wallace Booth and the Sunday singles, becoming the team's joint leading points scorer.

== Professional career ==
Hutsby turned professional immediately after the 2009 Walker Cup and made his first appearance as a professional in October 2009 at the Alfred Dunhill Links Championship. At the 2009 European Tour qualifying school, Hutsby finished 2nd behind Simon Khan, to earn a place on the European Tour for 2010. At the end of his rookie season he lost his playing rights and played on the Challenge Tour in 2011, where he finished 48th in the rankings.

Hutsby returned to the European Tour qualifying school in December 2011, finishing second once again behind David Dixon to secure status for the 2012 European Tour season.

In September 2014, Hutsby won the Kazakhstan Open on the Challenge Tour, beating Andrew Johnston by two shots.

In June 2023, Hutsby won his second tournament on the Challenge Tour at the Andalucía Challenge de Cádiz in Spain. He was victorious in a six-man playoff.

== Amateur wins ==
- 2004 Douglas Johns Trophy
- 2006 Spanish International Amateur Championship
- 2009 Copa Sotogrande

== Professional wins (3) ==
=== Challenge Tour wins (2) ===
No.	Date	Tournament	Winning score	Margin of victory	Runner(s)-up
1	21 Sep 2014	Kazakhstan Open	−19 (68-63-71-67=269)	2 strokes	(England) Andrew Johnston
2	11 Jun 2023	Andalucía Challenge de Cádiz	−15 (63-67-72-71=273)	Playoff	(France) Clément Berardo, (Italy) Filippo Celli, (Denmark) Nicolai Kristensen, (France) Julien Sale, (Sweden) Jesper Svensson

Challenge Tour playoff record (1–0)

No.	Year	Tournament	Opponents	Result
1	2023	Andalucía Challenge de Cádiz	(France) Clément Berardo, (Italy) Filippo Celli, (Denmark) Nicolai Kristensen, (France) Julien Sale, (Sweden) Jesper Svensson	Won with par on third extra hole Berardo, Celli, Kristensen and Svensson eliminated by birdie on first hole

=== Clutch Pro Tour wins (1) ===
No.	Date	Tournament	Winning score	Margin of victory	Runners-up
1	27 Sep 2022	Stoneham Classic	−7 (65)	1 stroke	(Jordan) Shergo Al Kurdi, (England) Lewis Scott

== Results in major championships ==
Tournament	2024
Masters Tournament	
PGA Championship	
U.S. Open	
The Open Championship	CUT

Did not play

CUT = missed the half-way cut

== Team appearances ==
Amateur

- European Boys' Team Championship (representing England): 2006
- Jacques Léglise Trophy (representing Great Britain & Ireland): 2006
- European Amateur Team Championship (representing England): 2008, 2009
- St Andrews Trophy (representing Great Britain & Ireland): 2008 (winners)
- Eisenhower Trophy (representing England): 2008
- European Nations Cup – Copa Sotogrande (representing England): 2009 (winners)
- Walker Cup (representing Great Britain & Ireland): 2009

== See also ==
- 2009 European Tour Qualifying School graduates
- 2011 European Tour Qualifying School graduates
- 2014 Challenge Tour graduates
- 2022 European Tour Qualifying School graduates
