= Julien Sale =

French professional golfer (born 1997)

Personal information
- Full name: Julien-Alexandre Sale
- Nationality: France
- Born: 26 September 1997 (age 29) Saint-Louis, Réunion

Career
- Sport: Golf
- College: Arkansas State University
- Turned professional: 2022
- Current tour: European Tour
- Former tours: Asian Tour; Challenge Tour; Alps Tour
- Professional wins: 3

Number of wins by tour
- Asian Tour: 1
- Challenge Tour: 2

Julien-Alexandre Sale (born 26 September 1997) is a French professional golfer who plays on the Asian Tour. He won the 2025 Philippine Open.

== Amateur career ==
Sale was born on the island of Réunion in the Indian Ocean. He was educated at Indian Hills (Iowa) Community College, where he was ranked number one junior college player in the nation by GolfStat and helped secure a runner-up finish at the NJCAA National Championship. He enrolled at Arkansas State University in 2018, where he helped the Red Wolves' capture their first Sun Belt Conference Championship in 2019.

Sale won the 2019 Spirit International Amateur together with a French team made up of Adrien Pendaries, Candice Mahé and Pauline Roussin. He represented France at the European Amateur Team Championship three times, securing a silver medal in 2021 at PGA Catalunya as his team lost the final to Denmark. Individually, he tied for 3rd in 2020 and was the medalist in 2022. In 2020 he runner-up at Austrian International Amateur and Czech International Amateur Championship.

== Professional career ==
Sale played on the 2022 Alps Tour where he recorded eight top-5 finishes, including 4 runner-ups, to finish second in the Order of Merit and graduate to the Challenge Tour.

On the 2023 Challenge Tour, Sale lost a playoff at the Andalucía Challenge de Cádiz to Sam Hutsby, and finished 50th in the rankings.

Earning a card at Q-School, in 2025 he joined the Asian Tour, where he made history by becoming the first member to win on his debut. Capturing the season opener, the Philippine Open, he also became the first French winner on the tour since Gregory Bourdy won the 2009 Hong Kong Open.

== Amateur wins ==
- 2017 NJCAA D1 National Preview
- 2018 NJCAA District III Championship, Golfweek Conference Challenge
- 2019 Golf Quebec Men's Provincial Amateur Championship, Bubba Barnett Intercollegiat
- 2020 Bubba Barnett Intercollegiate
- 2022 European Amateur Team Championship (individual medalist)

== Professional wins (3) ==
=== Asian Tour wins (1) ===
No.	Date	Tournament	Winning score	Margin of victory	Runners-up
1	26 Jan 2025	Smart Infinity Philippine Open	−11 (69-68-67-65=269)	1 stroke	(Japan) Tomoyo Ikemura, (Thailand) Sadom Kaewkanjana

=== Challenge Tour wins (2) ===
Legend
Tour Championships (1)
Other Challenge Tour (1)

No.	Date	Tournament	Winning score	Margin of victory	Runner-up
1	5 Jul 2026	Le Vaudreuil Golf Challenge	−12 (69-68-71-68=276)	1 stroke	(Denmark) Hamish Brown
2	1 Nov 2026	Grand Final	−22 (66-65-70-65=266)	4 strokes	(Denmark) Hamish Brown

Challenge Tour playoff record (0–1)

No.	Year	Tournament	Opponents	Result
1	2023	Andalucía Challenge de Cádiz	(France) Clément Berardo, (England) Sam Hutsby, (Denmark) Nicolai Kristensen, (Italy) Filippo Celli, (Sweden) Jesper Svensson	Hutsby won with par on third extra hole Berardo, Celli, Kristensen and Svensson eliminated by birdie on first hole

== Team appearances ==
Amateur

- Spirit International Amateur (representing France): 2019 (winners)
- European Amateur Team Championship (representing France): 2020, 2021, 2022
- Eisenhower Trophy (representing France): 2022
- European Nations Cup – Copa Sotogrande (representing France): 2022

== See also ==
- 2026 Challenge Tour graduates
