= 2025 European Tour Qualifying School graduates =

Golf qualifying tournament in Spain

2025 European Tour Qualifying School Final Stage
Tournament information
- Dates: 7–12 November 2024
- Location: Tarragona, Spain; 41.0798°N 1.1615°E
- Courses: Infinitum Golf (Lakes & Hills Courses)
- Tours: European Tour (unofficial event)

Statistics
- Par: 71 (L); 72 (H)
- Length: 7,001 yards (6,402 m) (L); 6,976 yards (6,379 m) (H)
- Field: 156, 60 after cut
- Cut: 280 (−6)
- Prize fund: €120,000
- Winner's share: €5,000

Champion
- (South Africa) Zander Lombard
- 391 (−37)
- Location in Spain Location in Catalonia

The 2025 European Tour Qualifying School graduates were determined following the conclusion of the 2025 European Tour (DP World Tour) Qualifying School Final Stage which was played 7–12 November at Infinitum Golf in Tarragona, Spain. It was the 48th edition of the European Tour Qualifying School. The top 20 and ties (20 in total) earned status to play on the 2026 European Tour, with the remaining players who finished outside the top 20 and ties, but having made the 72-hole cut, earning status to play on the 2026 Challenge Tour.

Zander Lombard won the event, scoring a record six-round total of 391 (37 under par).

== Results ==
The top 20 players (including ties) earned status to play on the 2026 European Tour. They were as follows:

Place	Player	Score	To par
1	(South Africa) Zander Lombard	64-69-67-64-64-63=391	−37
T2	(Canada) Aaron Cockerill	69-66-70-67-67-65=404	−24
T2	(Australia) Connor McKinney	62-73-68-67-65-69=404	−24
T2	(India) Shubhankar Sharma	70-69-66-67-66-66=404	−24
T5	(England) Nathan Kimsey	68-67-70-67-67-67=406	−22
T5	(Portugal) Daniel Rodrigues	69-66-69-69-65-68=406	−22
7	(France) Quentin Debove	69-68-71-63-67-69=407	−21
T8	(England) Matthew Baldwin	67-66-70-68-68-69=408	−20
T8	(United States) Davis Bryant	72-68-62-70-64-72=408	−20
T8	(Italy) Gregorio De Leo	67-66-69-71-68-67=408	−20
T8	(Zimbabwe) Benjamin Follett-Smith	66-67-67-71-65-72=408	−20
T12	(Spain) Adri Arnaus	72-65-68-70-65-69=409	−19
T12	(Norway) Andreas Halvorsen	66-69-68-70-66-70=409	−19
T12	(England) Eddie Pepperell	70-71-67-68-67-66=409	−19
T12	(England) Jack Yule	68-74-66-69-67-65=409	−19
T16	(Brazil) Fred Biondi	67-67-70-74-64-68=410	−18
T16	(Argentina) Andrés Gallegos	71-67-71-67-65-69=410	−18
T16	(Thailand) Sadom Kaewkanjana	70-69-66-70-67-68=410	−18
T16	(United States) Hunter Logan	66-73-69-68-67-67=410	−18
T16	(Netherlands) Mike Toorop	70-66-73-69-65-67=410	−18

The following players made the 72 hole cut, however finished outside the top 20 and ties, therefore earning status to play on the 2026 Challenge Tour.

- (England) John Gough (T21)
- (France) Alexander Lévy (T21)
- (Norway) Bård Skogen (T21)
- (Scotland) Marc Warren (T21)
- (Denmark) Hamish Brown (T25)
- (Portugal) Pedro Figueiredo (T25)
- (Australia) Jack Buchanan (T25)
- (Scotland) Gregor Graham (T25)
- (United States) Collin Adams (T29)
- (Sweden) Per Längfors (T29)
- (Italy) Lorenzo Scalise (T29)
- (Netherlands) Daan Huizing (T29)
- (Netherlands) Lars van Meijel (T33)
- (United States) Alex Goff (T33)
- (South Africa) Robin Williams (T33)
- (United States) Canon Claycomb (T33)
- (Spain) Santiago Tarrío (T37)
- (Netherlands) Wouter de Vries (T37)
- (England) Andrew Wilson (T37)
- (Sweden) Christofer Blomstrand (T37)
- (United States) Charles Huntzinger (T37)
- (South Africa) George Coetzee (T42)
- (Paraguay) Fabrizio Zanotti (T42)
- (Germany) Philipp Katich (T42)
- (England) Bailey Gill (T45)
- (Spain) Luis Masaveu (T45)
- (Australia) Quinnton Croker (T45)
- (United States) Austin Duncan (T45)
- (England) David Horsey (T49)
- (Italy) Jacopo Vecchi Fossa (T49)
- (England) Callum Tarren (T49)
- (England) Frank Kennedy (T49)
- (Slovakia) Tadeáš Teťák (T49)
- (Germany) Jannik de Bruyn (T49)
- (Sweden) Christofer Rahm (T55)
- (Republic of Ireland) Mark Power (T56)
- (United States) Matt Gilchrest (T56)
- (Denmark) Søren Broholt Lind (T56)
- (Australia) Jack Thompson (T56)
- (Italy) Matteo Cristoni (T60)

== Graduates ==
Place	Player	Career ET starts	Cuts made	Best finish
1	(South Africa) Zander Lombard	242	125	2nd/T2
T2	(Canada) Aaron Cockerill	147	90	2nd/T2
T2	(Australia) Connor McKinney (Note: European Tour rookie in 2026)	9	4	T29
T2	(India) Shubhankar Sharma	207	114	Win (x2)
T5	(England) Nathan Kimsey	78	47	2nd
T5	(Portugal) Daniel Rodrigues	1	0	CUT
7	(France) Quentin Debove	0	0	n/a
T8	(England) Matthew Baldwin	283	142	Win (x1)
T8	(United States) Davis Bryant	18	11	T4
T8	(Italy) Gregorio De Leo	23	8	T4
T8	(Zimbabwe) Benjamin Follett-Smith	38	14	T17
T12	(Spain) Adri Arnaus	154	88	Win (x1)
T12	(England) Eddie Pepperell	289	172	Win (x2)
T12	(England) Jack Yule	1	0	CUT
T12	(Norway) Andreas Halvorsen	24	11	T6
T16	(Brazil) Fred Biondi	3	1	T34
T16	(Argentina) Andrés Gallegos	0	0	n/a
T16	(Thailand) Sadom Kaewkanjana (Note: First-time full European Tour member in 2026, but ineligible for rookie status)	6	2	T11
T16	(United States) Hunter Logan	0	0	n/a
T16	(Netherlands) Mike Toorop	5	1	T50

== See also ==
- 2025 Challenge Tour graduates
