= Christoffer Bring =

Danish professional golfer (born 2001)

Personal information
- Nationality: Denmark
- Born: 17 November 1998 (age 27) Næstved, Denmark

Career
- Sport: Golf
- College: University of Texas at Austin
- Turned professional: 2021
- Current tour: Challenge Tour
- Former tours: European Tour; Nordic Golf League

Best results in major championships
- Masters Tournament: DNP
- PGA Championship: DNP
- U.S. Open: DNP
- The Open Championship: CUT: 2021

Christoffer Bring (born 17 November 1998) is a Danish professional golfer and European Tour player. He had a successful amateur career, winning both the 2021 European Amateur and the 2021 European Amateur Team Championship.

== Early life and amateur career ==
Bring was born Næstved and had a successful amateur career. He was runner-up at the 2015 Portuguese International Amateur and lost a playoff at the 2020 Brabazon Trophy, before winning the 2021 European Amateur, two strokes ahead of Ludvig Åberg. He shot a 20-under par 264, only a stroke away from the tournament record set by Carl Pettersson in 2000.

He was a member of the 2015 European Jacques Leglise Trophy Team at Royal Dornoch Golf Club, where his teammates in that 12 ½-12 ½ tie included Viktor Hovland and Guido Migliozzi.

Playing for Denmark he won the European Boys' Team Championship in 2015 and the European Amateur Team Championship in 2021.

Bring attended the University of Texas at Austin between 2017 and 2021, playing with the Texas Longhorns men's golf team.

== Professional career ==
Bring turned professional in August 2021 and joined the Nordic Golf League, where he was runner-up at the 2022 GolfStar Winter Series I in Spain, behind John Axelsen.

In November 2022, he finish tied 7th at European Tour Qualifying School, earning a place on the European Tour for 2023.

== Amateur wins ==
- 2015 Danish Boys Championship
- 2016 Mon Open
- 2020 Danish National Match Play Championship
- 2021 European Amateur

== Results in major championships ==
Tournament	2021
Masters Tournament	
PGA Championship	
U.S. Open	
The Open Championship	CUT

Did not play

CUT = missed the half-way cut

== Team appearances ==
Amateur

- Jacques Léglise Trophy (representing the continent of Europe): 2015 (tie)
- Duke of York Young Champions Trophy (representing Denmark): 2015
- European Boys' Team Championship (representing Denmark): 2014, 2015 (winners), 2016
- European Amateur Team Championship (representing Denmark): 2021 (winners)

== See also ==
- 2022 European Tour Qualifying School graduates
