= 2019 European Amateur Team Championship =

Golf competition

Tournament information
- Dates: 9–13 July 2019
- Location: Höllviken, Sweden; 55°24′N 12°55′E
- Course: Ljunghusen Golf Club
- Organized by: European Golf Association
- Format: Qualification round: 36 holes stroke play Knock-out match-play

Statistics
- Par: 72
- Length: 6,947 yards (6,352 m)
- Field: 16 teams 96 players

Champion
- Sweden; Ludvig Åberg, Albin Bergström, Vincent Norrman, David Nyfjäll, Pontus Nyholm, Christoffer Pålsson
- Qualification round: 714 (−6); Final match: 4 1/2–2 1/2
- Location in Europe Location in Sweden Location in Scania province

The 2019 European Amateur Team Championship took place 9–13 July at Ljunghusen Golf Club in Höllviken, Sweden. It was the 36th men's golf European Amateur Team Championship.

== Venue ==
The hosting club was founded in 1932 and by 1965 it was the first golf club in Scandinavia to feature 27 holes, one of three clubs with links courses at the south west tip of Sweden, in Vellinge Municipality, Scania County. The championship was played at holes 1–18.

The championship course was set up with par 72.

== Format ==
Each team consisted of six players, playing two rounds of an opening stroke-play qualifying competition over two days, counting the five best scores each day for each team.

The eight best teams formed flight A, in knock-out match-play over the next three days. The teams were seeded based on their positions after the stroke play. The first placed team was drawn to play the quarter-final against the eight placed team, the second against the seventh, the third against the sixth and the fourth against the fifth. Teams were allowed to use six players during the team matches, selecting four of them in the two morning foursome games and five players in to the afternoon single games. Teams knocked out after the quarter-finals played one foursome game and four single games in each of their remaining matches. Games all square at the 18th hole were declared halved, if the team match was already decided.

The eight teams placed 9–16 in the qualification stroke-play formed flight B, to play similar knock-out play, with one foursome game and four single games in each match, to decide their final positions.

== Teams ==
16 nation teams contested the event. Each team consisted of six players. Belgium, Slovenia, and Wales had qualified for the championship by finishing first, second, and third in the 2018 Division 2. The other teams qualified by finishing top 13 in the 2018 championship.

Players in the leading teams

Country	Players
Austria	Gerold Folk, Paul Kamml, Lukas Lipold, Oliver Rath, Niklas Regner, Maximilian Steinlechner
Belgium	Matthis Besard, Alan De Bondt, Yente Van Doren, Adrien Dumont de Chassart, Giovanni Tadiotto, Jean de Wouters d'Oplinter
Czech Republic	Jakub Bares, Petr Janik, Krystof Strycek, Simon Zach, Matyas Zapletal, Jiri Zuska
Denmark	John Axelsen, Hamish Brown, Alexander George Frances, Andreas Hillersborg Sorensen, August Thor Høst, Rasmus Neergaard-Petersen
England	Alex Fitzpatrick, Harry Hall, Ben Jones, Matty Lamb, Thomas Plumb, Tom Sloman
Finland	Alex Hietala, Matias Honkala, Jonatan Jolkkonen, Santeri Lehesmaa, Veeti Mähönen, Casper Simberg
France	Clément Charmasson, Alexandre Fuchs, Ko Jeong-weon, Adrien Pendaries, David Ravetto, Victor Veyret
Germany	Jannik de Bruyn, Marc Hammer, Alexander Herrmann, Maximilian Herrmann, Michael Hirmer, Matti Schmid
Iceland	Rúnar Arnórsson, Aron Snær Júlíusson, Birgir Björn Magnusson, Bjarki Pétursson, Dagbjartur Sigurbrandsson, Gísli Sveinbergsson
Ireland	Tiarnan McLarnon, Ronan Mullarney, Mark Power, Conor Purcell, Caolan Rafferty, James Sugrue
Netherlands	Dario Antonisse, Bob Geurts, Jerry Ji, Koen Kouwenaar, Nordin Van Tilburg, Kiet Van der Weele
Scotland	Stuart Easton, Ryan Lumsden, Euan McIntosh, Sandy Scott, Jamie Stewart, Euan Walker
Slovenia	Kristjan Vojteh Burkelca, Jan Hribernik, Luka Naglic, Vid Joze Potocar, Gal Patrik Stirn, Zan Luka Stirn
Spain	Eugenio Chacarra, Alejandro del Rey, Adrián Mata, Ignacio Montero, Victor Pastor, Eduard Rousaud
Sweden	Ludvig Åberg, Albin Bergström, Vincent Norrman, David Nyfjäll, Pontus Nyholm, Christoffer Pålsson
Wales	Ben Chamberlain, Archie Davies, Jacob Davies, Jake Hapgood, Matt Robert, Gaelen Trew

== Winners ==
Leader of the opening 36-hole competition was team Ireland, with a 19-under-par score of 701, three strokes ahead of team England.

There was no official award for the lowest individual score, but individual leader was Euan Walker, Scotland, with a 12-under-par score of 132, two strokes ahead of nearest competitor.

Host nation Sweden won the gold medal, earning their third title and first since 1961, beating eleven-times-champion team England in the final 4 1/2–2 1/2.

Team Scotland earned the bronze on third place, after beating Denmark 4–3 in the bronze match.

Finland, Czech Republic, and Slovenia placed 14th, 15th and 16th and was intended to be moved to Division 2 for 2020, to be replaced by Switzerland, Italy and Portugal, who finished first, second, and third respectively in the 2019 Division 2. The 2020 championship came to be reduced, due to the COVID-19 pandemic, with several teams not participating, why the qualification status was changed.

== Results ==
Qualification round

Team standings

Place	Country	Score	To par
1	Ireland	351-350=701	−19
2	England	351-353=704	−16
3	Scotland	353-357=710	−10
4	Sweden	353-361=714	−6
5	Germany	369-351=720	E
6	Spain	359-363=722	+2
7	Wales	370-362=732	+12
8	Denmark	366-368=734	+14
9	France	368-368=736	+16
10	Netherlands	369-368=737	+17
T11	Iceland *	363-375=738	+18
T11	Finland	372-366=738	+18
13	Austria	368-371=739	+19
14	Czech Republic	377-366=743	+23
15	Belgium	371-373=744	+24
16	Slovenia	387-382=769	+49

* Note: In the event of a tie the order was determined by the
best total of the two non-counting scores of the two rounds.

Individual leaders

Place	Player	Country	Score	To par
1	Euan Walker	Scotland	67-65=132	−12
2	Conor Purcell	Ireland	67-68=135	−10
3	Tom Sloman	England	67-69=136	−8
T4	Alex Fitzpatrick	England	69-70=139	−5
T4	Caolan Rafferty	Ireland	69-70=139	−5
6	Eugenio Chacarra	Spain	69-71=140	−4
T7	Albin Bergström	Sweden	71-70=141	−3
T7	Sandy Scott	Scotland	72-69=141	−3
T7	Ben Chamberlain	Wales	70-71=141	−3
T7	Ben Jones	England	71-70=141	−3
T7	Vincent Norrman	Sweden	68-73=141	−3
T7	David Nyfjäll	Sweden	68-73=141	−3

Note: There was no official award for the lowest individual score.

Flight A

Bracket

Quarter finals
Denmark	4
Ireland	3
Sweden	5.5
Germany	1.5
Scotland	4.5
Spain	2.5
England	4
Wales	3

Semi finals
Sweden	6
Denmark	1
England	4
Scotland	3

Final
Sweden	4.5
England	2.5
Bronze match
Scotland	4
Denmark	3

Elimination matches
Ireland	3
Germany	2
Wales	3.5
Spain	1.5

Match for 5th place
Ireland	3
Wales	2
Match for 7th place
Spain	3
Germany	2

Final games

Sweden	England
4.5	2.5
Åberg / Pålsson	Sloman / Plumb 2 & 1
Nyfjäll / Norrman 4 & 3	Fitzpatrick / Lamb
Pontus Nyholm 1 hole	Alex Fitzpatrick
Ludvig Åberg 3 & 1	Tom Sloman
David Nyfjäll AS *	Thomas Plumb AS *
Vincent Norrman	Harry Hall 2 & 1
Albin Bergström 3 & 2	Ben Jones

* Note: Game declared halved, since team match already decided.

Flight B

Bracket

Round 1
France	4.5
Slovenia	0.5
Austria	3.5
Finland	1.5
Iceland	4
Czech Republic	1
Belgium	3.
Netherlands	2

Round 2
France	3
Austria	2
Belgium	4.5
Iceland	0.5

Match for 9th place
France	3
Belgium	2
Match for 11th place
Austria	3
Iceland	2

Elimination matches
Finland	4
Slovenia	1
Netherlands	4
Czech Republic	1

Match for 13th place
Netherlands	3
Finland	2
Match for 15th place
Czech Republic	3
Slovenia	2

Final standings

Place	Country
1st place, gold medalist(s)	Sweden
2nd place, silver medalist(s)	England
3rd place, bronze medalist(s)	Scotland
4	Denmark
5	Ireland
6	Wales
7	Spain
8	Germany
9	France
10	Belgium
11	Austria
12	Iceland
13	Netherlands
14	Finland
15	Czech Republic
16	Slovenia

== See also ==
- Eisenhower Trophy – biennial world amateur team golf championship for men organized by the International Golf Federation.
- European Ladies' Team Championship – European amateur team golf championship for women organised by the European Golf Association.
