= 2009 Challenge Tour graduates =

This is a list of players who graduated from the Challenge Tour in 2009. The top 20 players on the Challenge Tour's money list in 2009 earned their European Tour card for 2010.

	2009 Challenge Tour		2010 European Tour				
Player	Money list rank	Earnings (€)	Starts	Cuts made	Best finish	Money list rank	Earnings (€)
(Italy) Edoardo Molinari	1	242,980	28	24	Win (x2)	11	2,009,337
(Portugal) José-Filipe Lima	2	134,623	27	12	T17	161	83,604
(Belgium) Nicolas Colsaerts	3	128,590	25	16	T3	67	423,513
(Wales) Rhys Davies*	4	113,187	31	22	Win	18	1,218,636
(Scotland) Peter Whiteford	5	110,593	28	17	T2	86	334,271
(England) Andrew Butterfield	6	110,488	25	1	T54	296	4,960
(England) Gary Boyd*	7	104,952	27	16	T2	50	715,106
(France) Julien Quesne*	8	94,636	30	16	T16	156	93,303
(England) Richard McEvoy	9	92,919	28	13	T8	101	261,196
(England) Robert Coles	10	89,304	28	12	T4	107	233,214
(England) Peter Baker	11	74,243	21	7	T35	204	33,360
(Spain) Carlos Rodiles	12	73,898	21	6	T35	205	31,795
(England) Chris Gane	13	73,230	19	6	T6	178	57,367
(England) John Parry*	14	71,318	33	22	Win	51	706,108
(Australia) Andrew Tampion	15	65,416	23	3	T45	268	9,103
(France) Julien Guerrier*	16	64,741	21	12	T5	122	172,305
(Scotland) Andrew McArthur*	17	62,856	17	7	T29	198	39,235
(England) James Morrison*	18	61,370	27	12	Win	61	518,750
(Wales) Sion Bebb	19	61,231	19	11	T17	158	90,740
(France) François Calmels	20	58,920	8	2	T31	278	7,598

* European Tour rookie in 2010
T = Tied
The player retained his European Tour card for 2011 (finished inside the top 117).
The player did not retain his European Tour Tour card for 2011, but retained conditional status (finished between 118 and 150).
The player did not retain his European Tour card for 2011 (finished outside the top 150).

Molinari won three Challenge Tour events in 2009. The players ranked 16th through 20th were placed below the Qualifying School graduates on the exemption list, and thus could improve their status by competing in Qualifying School; Julien Guerrier improved his status in this way.

== Winners on the European Tour in 2010 ==
No.	Date	Player	Tournament	Winning score	Margin of victory	Runner-up
1	21 Mar	(Wales) Rhys Davies	Trophée Hassan II	−25 (68-64-68-66=266)	2 strokes	(South Africa) Louis Oosthuizen
2	11 Apr	(England) James Morrison	Madeira Islands Open BPI - Portugal	−20 (67-65-66-70=268)	1 stroke	(England) Oliver Fisher
3	11 Jul	(Italy) Edoardo Molinari	Barclays Scottish Open	−12 (66-69-63-74=272)	3 strokes	(Northern Ireland) Darren Clarke
4	29 Aug	(Italy) Edoardo Molinari (2)	Johnnie Walker Championship at Gleneagles	−10 (70-68-69-71=278)	1 stroke	(Australia) Brett Rumford
5	26 Sep	(England) John Parry	Vivendi Cup	−17 (64-67-70-70=271)	2 strokes	(Sweden) Johan Edfors

== Runners-up on the European Tour in 2010 ==
No.	Date	Player	Tournament	Winner	Winning score	Runner-up score
1	28 Mar	(Scotland) Peter Whiteford	Open de Andalucia de Golf	(South Africa) Louis Oosthuizen	−17 (67-63-66-67=263)	−14 (69-64-67-66=266)
2	18 Apr	(Wales) Rhys Davies	Volvo China Open	(South Korea) Yang Yong-eun	−15 (68-66-68-71=273)	−13 (73-70-65-67=275)
3	2 May	(England) James Morrison lost in playoff	Open de España	(Spain) Álvaro Quirós	−11 (68-72-67-70=277)	−11 (73-67-70-67=277)
4	30 May	(Wales) Rhys Davies (2)	Madrid Masters	(England) Luke Donald	−21 (65-67-68-67=267)	−20 (65-68-67-68=268)
5	6 Jun	(Wales) Rhys Davies (3)	Celtic Manor Wales Open	(Northern Ireland) Graeme McDowell	−15 (72-70-64-63=269)	−12 (67-73-70=62=272)
6	22 Aug	(England) Gary Boyd lost in three-man playoff	Czech Open	(Sweden) Peter Hanson	−10 (67-70-67-74=278)	−10 (72-70-68-68=278)
7	5 Sep	(Italy) Edoardo Molinari	Omega European Masters	(Spain) Miguel Ángel Jiménez	−21 (67-61-68-67=263)	−18 (66-65-68-67=266)

== See also ==
- 2009 European Tour Qualifying School graduates
