= Gary Boyd (golfer) =

English golfer (born 1986)

Personal information
- Full name: Gary Stuart Boyd
- Nationality: England
- Born: 4 October 1986 (age 40) Banbury, England
- Height: 6 ft 1 in (1.85 m)
- Weight: 190 lb (86 kg; 14 st)

Career
- Sport: Golf
- Turned professional: 2007
- Current tour: Challenge Tour
- Former tour: European Tour
- Professional wins: 2

Number of wins by tour
- Challenge Tour: 1
- Other: 1

Best results in major championships
- Masters Tournament: DNP
- PGA Championship: DNP
- U.S. Open: CUT: 2010
- The Open Championship: T38: 2011

Gary Stuart Boyd (born 4 October 1986) is an English professional golfer who currently plays on the Challenge Tour.

== Early life ==
Boyd was born on 4 October 1986 in Banbury, England and attended Chenderit School in Middleton Cheney.

== Professional career ==
In 2007, Boyd turned professional. Boyd had a strong start to the 2009 Challenge Tour season, recording his first win at the Tusker Kenya Open. He followed that by finishing as runner-up to Edoardo Molinari at the Piemonte Open, to lead the Challenge Tour Rankings at the end of May.

He had a good first season on the European Tour in 2010, the highlight being a runner-up finish at the Czech Open and he finished 50th on the Order of Merit. However after a poor 2012 season he lost his full playing rights on tour.

In 2015 he played on the Challenge Tour, initially on invitations, and finished seventh to earn a return to the European Tour.

== Amateur wins ==
- 2006 Asia Pacific Amateur Championship

== Professional wins (2) ==
=== Challenge Tour wins (1) ===
No.	Date	Tournament	Winning score	Margin of victory	Runners-up
1	19 Apr 2009	Tusker Kenya Open	−13 (67-64-71-69=271)	4 strokes	(England) Andrew Butterfield, (England) Philip Golding

Challenge Tour playoff record (0–2)

No.	Year	Tournament	Opponent	Result
1	2008	Abierto Visa del Centro	(Argentina) Estanislao Goya	Lost to birdie on first extra hole
2	2015	Swiss Challenge	(United States) Daniel Im	Lost to birdie on first extra hole

=== Clutch Pro Tour wins (1) ===
No.	Date	Tournament	Winning score	Margin of victory	Runners-up
1	29 Sep 2022	Northamptonshire County Classic	−5 (65)	Playoff	(England) Paul Maddy, (England) Daniel Smith

== Playoff record ==
European Tour playoff record (0–1)

No.	Year	Tournament	Opponents	Result
1	2010	Czech Open	(Sweden) Peter Hanson, (Republic of Ireland) Peter Lawrie	Hanson won with birdie on second extra hole

== Results in major championships ==
Tournament	2008	2009	2010	2011	2012	2013	2014	2015
Masters Tournament								
U.S. Open			CUT					
The Open Championship	CUT			T38				CUT
PGA Championship								

Did not play

CUT = missed the half-way cut
"T" = tied

== Team appearances ==
Amateur

- Jacques Léglise Trophy (representing Great Britain and Ireland): 2004 (winners)
- European Youths' Team Championship (representing England): 2006
- European Amateur Team Championship (representing England): 2007

== See also ==
- 2009 Challenge Tour graduates
- 2015 Challenge Tour graduates
