= James Morrison (golfer) =

English professional golfer

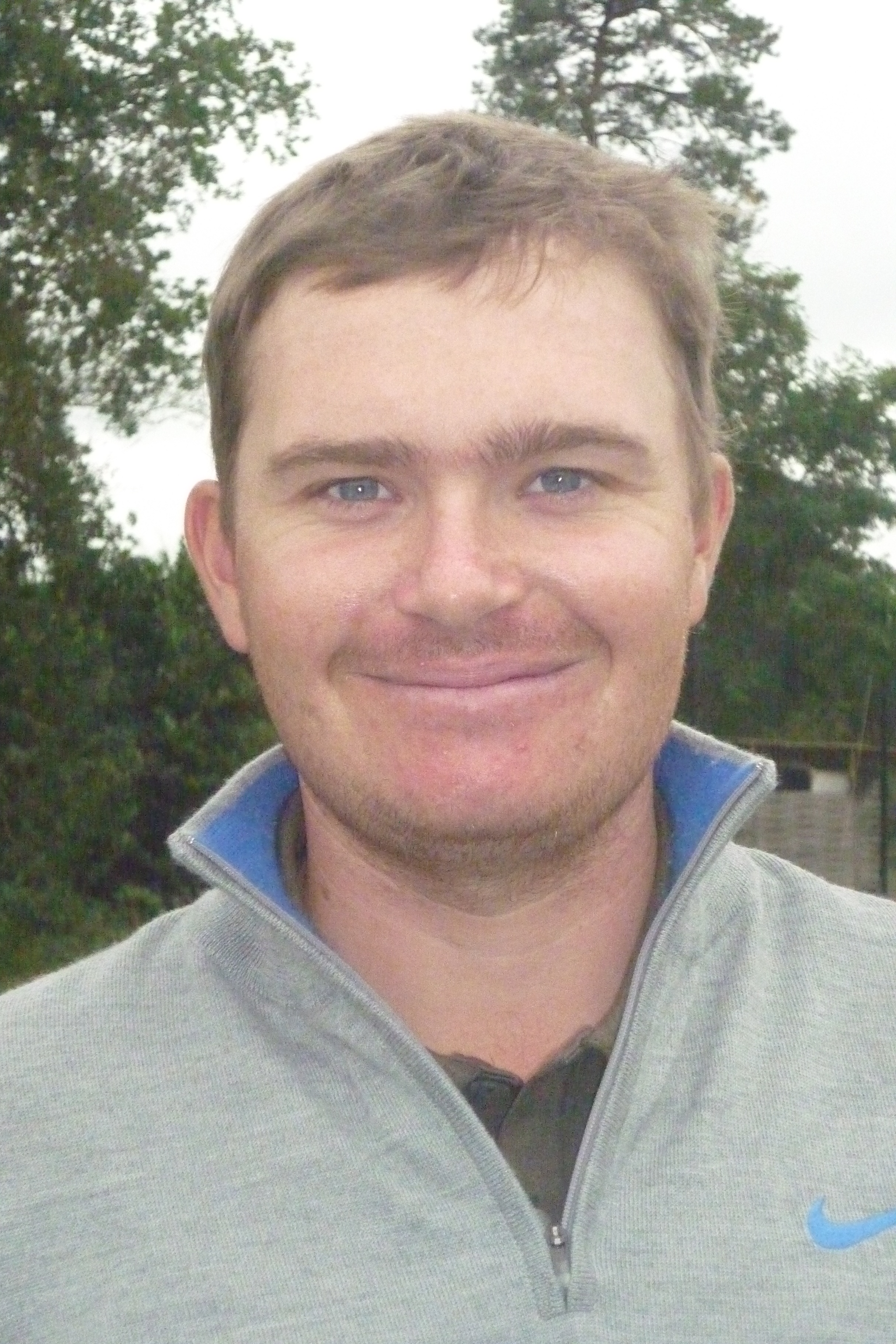
- Morrison at the 2011 KLM Open

Personal information
- Full name: James Ian Morrison
- Nationality: England
- Born: 24 January 1985 (age 41) Chertsey, England
- Height: 1.80 m (5 ft 11 in)
- Weight: 81 kg (179 lb; 12.8 st)

Career
- Sport: Golf
- College: University of South Carolina
- Turned professional: 2006
- Current tour: Challenge Tour
- Former tour: European Tour
- Professional wins: 4
- Highest ranking: 80 (4 October 2015)

Number of wins by tour
- European Tour: 2
- Challenge Tour: 2

Best results in major championships
- Masters Tournament: DNP
- PGA Championship: 77th: 2015
- U.S. Open: CUT: 2010, 2018
- The Open Championship: T20: 2015

James Ian Morrison (born 24 January 1985) is an English professional golfer.

== Early life and amateur career ==
Morrison attended Reed's School. He played in the same England youth cricket teams as Alastair Cook, Ravi Bopara and Tim Bresnan, with whom he remains friends.

At the age of 16, he switched to golf and his handicap fell from 18 to scratch in less than a year. He subsequently accepted a scholarship to the University of South Carolina.

== Professional career ==
In 2006, Morrison turned professional. He played initially on the PGA EuroPro Tour.

At the end of 2007, he played all three stages of Qualifying School and finished 44th, earning a regular place on the Challenge Tour. He finished 18th in the 2009 Challenge Tour Rankings to secure his place on the 2010 European Tour.

In April 2010, he claimed his first win on the European Tour, winning the Madeira Islands Open BPI - Portugal, finishing on 20 under par. Three weeks later he finished second at the Open de España, having lost a playoff for the title to Álvaro Quirós.

In May 2015, Morrison won the Open de España by shooting a final-round 69 for his second European Tour victory. Later that year, he finished second at the Alstom Open de France, three shots behind Bernd Wiesberger.

In August 2021, Morrison recorded his best finish on the European Tour since 2015. He carded a final round 63 at the Hero Open to finish one shot behind Grant Forrest. Forrest birdied the final two holes to take the title from Morrison.

In June 2025, Morrison won the Blot Play9 on the Challenge Tour, beating Max Kennedy in a playoff. It was his first tournament victory in over 10 years. In November, he won the Rolex Grand Final, jumping to sixth position in the season rankings, gaining status to play on the 2026 European Tour. Morrison had originally intended for event to be his final professional appearance but changed his plans after winning the tournament.

== Personal life ==
Morrison has suffered from the chronic auto-immune condition Crohn's disease since his mid-teens.

== Professional wins (4) ==
=== European Tour wins (2) ===
| No. | Date | Tournament | Winning score | Margin of victory | Runner(s)-up |
|---|---|---|---|---|---|
| 1 | 11 Apr 2010 | Madeira Islands Open BPI - Portugal | −20 (67-65-66-70=268) | 1 stroke | (England) Oliver Fisher |
| 2 | 17 May 2015 | Open de España | −10 (70-71-68-69=278) | 4 strokes | (France) Édouard España, (England) David Howell, (Spain) Miguel Ángel Jiménez, (Italy) Francesco Molinari |

European Tour playoff record (0–1)

| No. | Year | Tournament | Opponent | Result |
|---|---|---|---|---|
| 1 | 2010 | Open de España | (Spain) Álvaro Quirós | Lost to par on first extra hole |

=== Challenge Tour wins (2) ===
Legend
Tour Championships (1)
Other Challenge Tour (1)

| No. | Date | Tournament | Winning score | Margin of victory | Runner-up |
|---|---|---|---|---|---|
| 1 | 22 Jun 2025 | Blot Play9 | −6 (64-66-74-70=274) | Playoff | (Republic of Ireland) Max Kennedy |
| 2 | 2 Nov 2025 | Rolex Grand Final | −15 (71-67-65-70=273) | 3 strokes | (Italy) Stefano Mazzoli |

Challenge Tour playoff record (1–1)

| No. | Year | Tournament | Opponent | Result |
|---|---|---|---|---|
| 1 | 2009 | SWALEC Wales Challenge | (Wales) Rhys Davies | Lost to par on third extra hole |
| 2 | 2025 | Blot Play9 | (Republic of Ireland) Max Kennedy | Won with par on first extra hole |

== Results in major championships ==
| Tournament | 2010 | 2011 | 2012 | 2013 | 2014 | 2015 | 2016 | 2017 | 2018 |
|---|---|---|---|---|---|---|---|---|---|
| Masters Tournament | | | | | | | | | |
| U.S. Open | CUT | | | | | | | | CUT |
| The Open Championship | | | T23 | | | T20 | CUT | | |
| PGA Championship | | | | | | 77 | CUT | | |

Did not play

CUT = missed the half-way cut
"T" = tied

== Results in World Golf Championships ==
| Tournament | 2015 |
|---|---|
| Championship | |
| Match Play | |
| Invitational | |
| Champions | T27 |

Did not play

"T" = Tied

== See also ==
- 2009 Challenge Tour graduates
- 2013 European Tour Qualifying School graduates
- 2025 Challenge Tour graduates
