= Rhys Davies (golfer) =

Welsh professional golfer

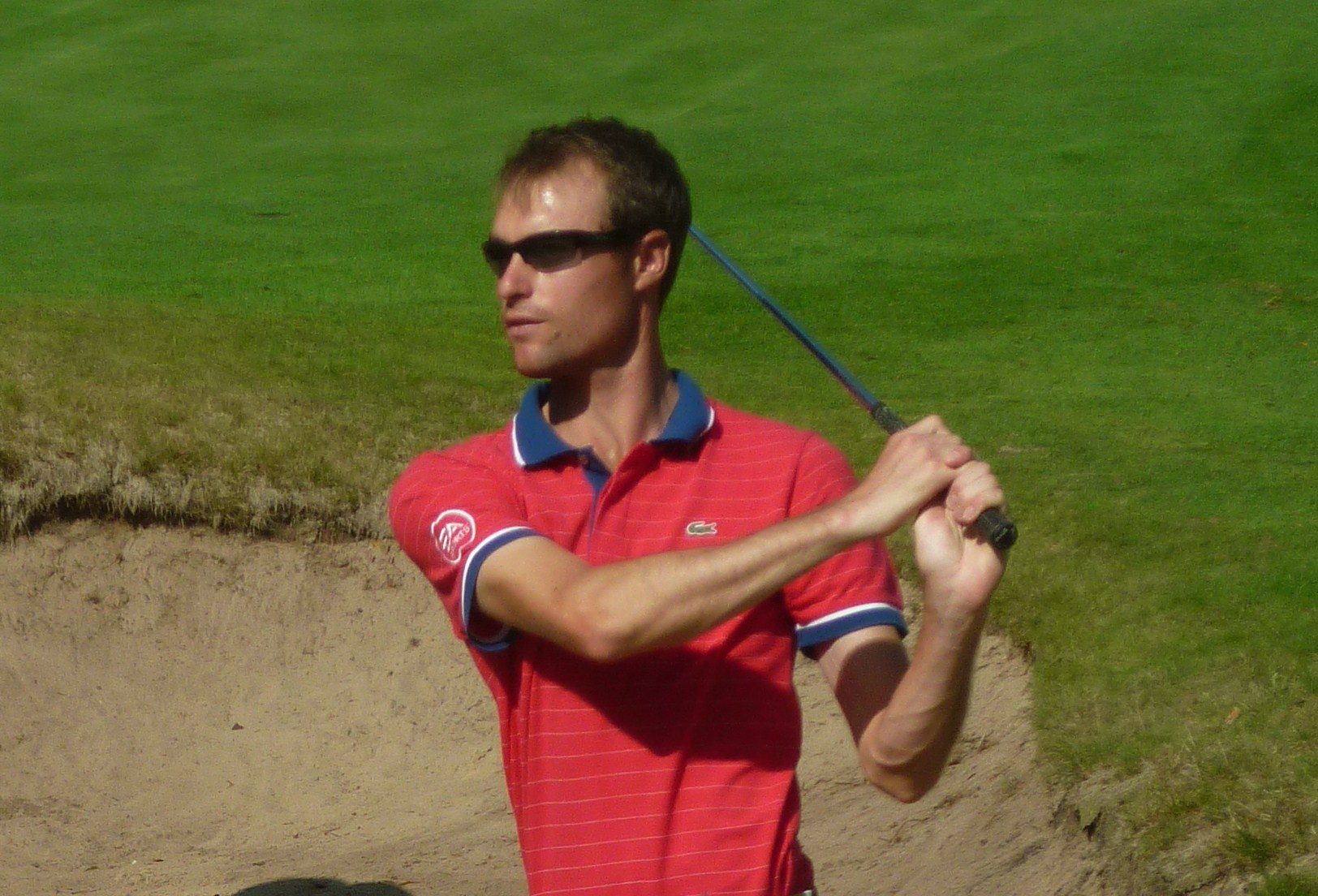

Personal information
- Full name: Rhys Davies
- Nationality: Wales
- Born: 28 May 1985 (age 41) Edinburgh, Scotland

Career
- Sport: Golf
- College: East Tennessee State University
- Turned professional: 2007
- Former tours: European Tour; Asian Tour; Challenge Tour
- Professional wins: 5
- Highest ranking: 44 (20 June 2010)

Number of wins by tour
- European Tour: 1
- Challenge Tour: 4

Best results in major championships
- Masters Tournament: DNP
- PGA Championship: T62: 2010
- U.S. Open: T74: 2010
- The Open Championship: CUT: 2009, 2010, 2011

Rhys Davies (born 28 May 1985) is a Welsh former professional golfer. He is currently the player development manager in Europe for Excel Sports Management.

== Early life ==
Davies was born in Edinburgh, Scotland, but has lived in Wales for the majority of his life. At age 16, Davies had to choose between cricket and golf. At that time he was a Glamorgan CC Academy, and ECB England National Development Squad player. The latter also included Alistair Cook, Ravi Bopara, Tim Bresnan and Samit Patel who would play test cricket subsequently.

== Amateur career ==
Davies played collegiate golf in the United States at East Tennessee State University where he won ten times and was a first team All-American in 2005, 2006, and 2007. He played on two Walker Cup teams (2005 and 2007), and for Europe in four Palmer Cup teams (2004, 2005, 2006, 2007). Davies twice led NCAA rankings, and was second in the World Amateur Golf Ranking (May 2007).

== Professional career ==
In September 2007, he turned pro. Davies successfully came through the Asian Tour's qualifying school in 2007 allowing him to play on that tour for the 2008 and 2009 seasons, twice finishing runner-up (once via a play-off).

Davies won twice on the Challenge Tour in 2009 and finished fourth on that Tour's Rankings to earn his European Tour card for 2010. He won his first European Tour title at the 2010 Trophée Hassan II in Morocco. At the 2010 Celtic Manor Wales Open, he shot a final round 62 to set the course record on his way to finishing runner-up. This performance elevated Davies into the top 50 of the Official World Golf Ranking for the first time. In 2011 Davies represented Europe against Asia in Thailand, winning 2 points (from 3) to help win The Royal Trophy. After a poor 2012 season, Davies narrowly failed to maintain his full European Tour playing rights for the 2013 season.

Davies earned his first professional win in five years at the 2015 Turkish Airlines Challenge, and followed this three months later with victory at the Challenge de Espana, when he opened with a first round 60. These successes helped Davies secure eighth position on the Challenge Tour order of merit, and regain full European Tour status.

Davies retired from playing professional golf in 2019 and then undertook freelance media work for Sky Sports Golf, the European Tour podcast, and the R&A. In 2021, Davies became the European Player Development Manager for American company Excelsports management.

In total, Davies played 314 professional tournaments with 5 wins, 9 second, 8 third, and 43 top-10 places). These include 170 European Tour tournaments (1 win; 4 second; 2 third and 12 top-10 places), and 6 majors.

== Amateur wins ==
- 1999-2003 14 junior championships
- 2000 Welsh Junior Championship U-16
- 2003 Boys Amateur Championship
- 2006 European Youth Team Championship, individual medallist
- 2006 Scratch Players Championship
- 2003–07 10 collegiate championships in USA

== Professional wins (5) ==
=== European Tour wins (1) ===
No.	Date	Tournament	Winning score	Margin of victory	Runner-up
1	21 Mar 2010	Trophée Hassan II	−25 (68-64-68-66=266)	2 strokes	(South Africa) Louis Oosthuizen

European Tour playoff record (0–1)

No.	Year	Tournament	Opponents	Result
1	2011	Trophée Hassan II	(England) David Horsey, (South Africa) Jaco van Zyl	Horsey won with birdie on second extra hole

=== Challenge Tour wins (4) ===
No.	Date	Tournament	Winning score	Margin of victory	Runner-up
1	26 Jul 2009	SWALEC Wales Challenge	−2 (77-68-70-71=286)	Playoff	(England) James Morrison
2	6 Sep 2009	Fred Olsen Challenge de España	−17 (65-70-65-67=267)	1 stroke	(Sweden) Steven Jeppesen
3	10 May 2015	Turkish Airlines Challenge	−14 (69-70-65-70=274)	4 strokes	(Italy) Lorenzo Gagli
4	19 Jul 2015	Fred Olsen Challenge de España (2)	−22 (60-67-67-68=262)	2 strokes	(Australia) Geoff Drakeford

Challenge Tour playoff record (1–1)

No.	Year	Tournament	Opponent(s)	Result
1	2009	SWALEC Wales Challenge	(England) James Morrison	Won with par on third extra hole
2	2009	SK Golf Challenge	(Belgium) Nicolas Colsaerts, (France) Julien Guerrier	Colsaerts won with birdie on second extra hole

== Playoff record ==
Asian Tour playoff record (0–1)

No.	Year	Tournament	Opponents	Result
1	2008	Hana Bank Vietnam Masters	(Australia) Andrew Dodt, (Thailand) Thongchai Jaidee	Jaidee won with par on third extra hole Dodt eliminated by birdie on second hole

== Results in major championships ==
Tournament	2007	2008	2009	2010	2011
U.S. Open	CUT			T74	
The Open Championship			CUT	CUT	CUT
PGA Championship				T62	

Note: Davies never played in the Masters Tournament.

Did not play

CUT = missed the half-way cut
"T" = tied

== Results in World Golf Championships ==
Tournament	2010	2011
Match Play		
Championship		T61
Invitational	T71	
Champions	T53	

Did not play

"T" = Tied

== Team appearances ==
Amateur

- Boys' Home Internationals (representing Wales) 2000, 2001, 2002, 2003
- European Young Masters (representing Wales) 2001
- Men's Home internationals (representing Wales) 2002, 2003, 2004, 2005, 2006.
- European Boys' Team Championship (representing Wales): 2001, 2002, 2003
- Jacques Léglise Trophy (representing Great Britain and Ireland): 2002 (winners), 2003 (winners)
- European Youths' Team Championship (representing Wales): 2004, 2006
- Eisenhower Trophy (representing Wales): 2004, 2006
- Palmer Cup (representing Europe): 2004 (winners), 2005, 2006 (winners), 2007
- European Amateur Team Championship (representing Wales): 2005, 2007
- Walker Cup (representing Great Britain and Ireland): 2005, 2007
- St Andrews Trophy (representing Great Britain and Ireland): 2006 (winners)

Professional

- Royal Trophy (representing Europe): 2011 (winners)
- World Cup (representing Wales): 2011

== See also ==
- 2009 Challenge Tour graduates
- 2015 Challenge Tour graduates
- List of golfers with most Challenge Tour wins
