= Alan Wagner (golfer) =

Argentine golfer

Personal information
- Nationality: Argentina
- Born: 8 August 1989 (age 37) Buenos Aires, Argentina
- Height: 1.80 m (5 ft 11 in)
- Weight: 73 kg (161 lb; 11.5 st)

Career
- Sport: Golf
- Turned professional: 2007
- Current tour: PGA Tour Latinoamérica
- Former tour: Challenge Tour
- Professional wins: 5

Number of wins by tour
- Challenge Tour: 1
- Other: 4

Alan Wagner (born 8 August 1989) is an Argentine professional golfer. As an amateur he won the Argentine Amateur Championship in 2005.

== Amateur wins ==
- 2005 Argentine Amateur Championship

== Professional wins (5) ==
=== Challenge Tour wins (1) ===
No.	Date	Tournament	Winning score	Margin of victory	Runner-up
1	22 Mar 2009	Club Colombia Masters^{1}	−13 (68-71-68-68=275)	1 stroke	(Italy) Edoardo Molinari

^{1}Co-sanctioned by the Tour de las Américas

=== PGA Tour Latinoamérica wins (2) ===
No.	Date	Tournament	Winning score	Margin of victory	Runners-up
1	14 Oct 2012	Roberto De Vicenzo Invitational Copa NEC	−15 (69-72-64-68=273)	2 strokes	(Argentina) Ariel Cañete, (Mexico) Óscar Fraustro
2	12 Dec 2021 (2022 season)	Scotia Wealth Management Chile Open	−15 (62-69-71-71=273)	1 stroke	(United States) Chandler Blanchet, (Argentina) Jorge Fernández-Valdés

=== Tour de las Américas wins (2) ===
No.	Date	Tournament	Winning score	Margin of victory	Runner-up
1	21 Sep 2008	Taurus Abierto de Peru	−13 (65-70-74-66=275)	2 strokes	(Colombia) Juan Echeverri
2	22 Mar 2009	Club Colombia Masters^{1}	−13 (68-71-68-68=275)	1 stroke	(Italy) Edoardo Molinari

^{1}Co-sanctioned by the Challenge Tour

=== Ángel Cabrera Tour wins (1) ===
No.	Date	Tournament	Winning score	Margin of victory	Runner-up
1	6 Aug 2016	Ángel Cabrera Tour 3	−8 (66-68=134)	1 stroke	(Argentina) Franco Romero

== Team appearances ==
Amateur

- Eisenhower Trophy (representing Argentina): 2006
- Copa de las Americas (representing Argentina): 2007 (individual winner)
