= Challenge de España =

Golf tournament in Spain

Tournament information
- Location: Huelva, Spain
- Established: 1999
- Course: Isla Canela Links
- Par: 71
- Length: 7,128 yards (6,518 m)
- Tour: Challenge Tour
- Format: Stroke play
- Prize fund: €300,000
- Month played: May

Tournament record score
- Aggregate: 260 Brooks Koepka (2013); 260 Adrien Saddier (2016)
- To par: −24 Brooks Koepka (2013) −24 Adrien Saddier (2016) −24 Victor Perez (2017)

Current champion
- (South Africa) Ryan van Velzen

Location map
- Location in Spain Location in Andalusia

The Challenge de España is a golf tournament on the Challenge Tour that is played in Spain. It has run annually since 1999 except in 2005.

== Winners ==
Year	Winner	Score	To par	Margin of victory	Runner(s)-up	Venue
Challenge de España
2026	(South Africa) Ryan van Velzen	267	−17	2 strokes	(Netherlands) Wil Besseling (United States) Dan Erickson	Fontanals
2025	(France) Clément Charmasson	267	−17	1 stroke	(Denmark) Victor Sidal Svendsen	Isla Canela
2024	(Spain) Joel Moscatel	274	−14	1 stroke	(Denmark) Rasmus Neergaard-Petersen (Finland) Tapio Pulkkanen	Sevilla Golf
2023	(France) Martin Couvra (a)	268	−12	Playoff	(Northern Ireland) Dermot McElroy (Italy) Andrea Pavan	Playa Serena
2022	(Sweden) Jens Dantorp	278	−10	3 strokes	(Spain) Victor Pastor	Iberostar Real Club
2021	(Spain) Santiago Tarrío	268	−20	1 stroke	(Scotland) Ewen Ferguson (France) Frédéric Lacroix (Australia) Blake Windred	Iberostar Real Club
Andalucía Challenge de España
2020	(Czech Republic) Ondřej Lieser	278	−10	2 strokes	(England) Richard Mansell	Iberostar Real Club
Challenge de España
2019	(France) Antoine Rozner	275	−13	4 strokes	(Finland) Antti Ahokas (Spain) Sebastián García Rodríguez (Denmark) Rasmus Højgaard (Denmark) Martin Simonsen (Sweden) Joel Sjöholm	Izki Golf
2018	(Sweden) Oscar Lengdén	273	−15	4 strokes	(Netherlands) Wil Besseling (England) Ross McGowan	Izki Golf
2017	(France) Victor Perez	264	−24	3 strokes	(Norway) Jarand Ekeland Arnøy	Izki Golf
Fred Olsen Challenge de España
2016	(France) Adrien Saddier	260	−24	3 strokes	(Italy) Nicolò Ravano	Tecina Golf
2015	(Wales) Rhys Davies	262	−22	2 strokes	(Australia) Geoff Drakeford	Tecina Golf
2014	(Germany) Moritz Lampert	264	−20	2 strokes	(Belgium) Hugues Joannes	Tecina Golf
2013	(United States) Brooks Koepka	260	−24	10 strokes	(Spain) Luis Claverie (France) Édouard Dubois (Germany) Bernd Ritthammer	Tecina Golf
2012	(Spain) Eduardo de la Riva	265	−19	1 stroke	(England) Simon Wakefield	Tecina Golf
2011	(England) Matthew Baldwin	263	−21	Playoff	(France) Julien Guerrier	Tecina Golf
2010	(Spain) Álvaro Velasco	266	−18	2 strokes	(Scotland) Elliot Saltman	Tecina Golf
2009	(Wales) Rhys Davies	267	−17	1 stroke	(Sweden) Steven Jeppesen	Tecina Golf
Reale Challenge de España
2008	(Scotland) Andrew McArthur	280	−8	1 stroke	(Spain) Alfredo García-Heredia (Scotland) Lloyd Saltman	Club de Golf Retamares
OKI Mahou Challenge de España
2007	(Chile) Felipe Aguilar	271	−17	Playoff	(Germany) Tobias Dier	Golf Campo de Layos
2006	(France) Adrien Mörk	271	−17	2 strokes	(Wales) Kyron Sullivan	Centro Nacional de Golf
2005: No tournament
Segura Viudas Challenge de España
2004	(France) Philippe Lima	274	−14	Playoff	(Italy) Alessandro Napoleoni	Torremirona Golf Club
Izki Challenge de España
2003	(Sweden) Martin Erlandsson	273	−15	3 strokes	(Spain) José Manuel Carriles (Scotland) Scott Drummond (Sweden) Peter Hanson (England) Martin LeMesurier	Izki Golf
2002	(Sweden) Fredrik Widmark	276	−16	1 stroke	(Sweden) Raimo Sjöberg	Izki Golf
Segura Viudas Challenge de España
2001	(Scotland) Euan Little	277	−11	1 stroke	(Spain) Jesús María Arruti	Club de Golf Villamartin
Challenge de España
2000	(Sweden) Eric Carlberg	271	−17	5 strokes	(Spain) Carlos Rodiles	Golf del Guadiana
Comunitat Valenciana Challenge de España
1999	(Spain) Carl Suneson	280	−8	2 strokes	(Spain) Manuel Moreno	El Saler
