= Andrew Tampion =

Australian professional golfer

Personal information
- Full name: Andrew Tampion
- Nationality: Australia
- Born: 20 October 1984 (age 42) Melbourne, Australia
- Height: 5 ft 11 in (1.80 m)
- Weight: 176 lb (80 kg; 12.6 st)

Career
- Sport: Golf
- Turned professional: 2006
- Former tours: European Tour; PGA Tour of Australasia; Challenge Tour
- Professional wins: 2

Number of wins by tour
- Challenge Tour: 2

Best results in major championships
- Masters Tournament: DNP
- PGA Championship: DNP
- U.S. Open: DNP
- The Open Championship: CUT: 2008

Andrew Tampion (born 20 October 1984) is an Australian professional golfer.

== Career ==
Tampion was born in Melbourne, Australia. He turned professional in 2006.

Tampion played on the European Tour in 2007. His best finish of the season came at the Indonesia Open, where he finished tied for second behind Mikko Ilonen in what was just his fourth start of the season. He struggled for the remainder of the season, however, and failed to retain his card.

Tampion spent much of 2008 playing on the Challenge Tour and secured his first professional victory at the Challenge of Ireland.

After finishing fifteenth in the Challenge Tour Rankings the following year, Tampion ensured he would be playing on the European Tour in 2010.

== Amateur wins ==
this list may be incomplete

- 2004 Master of the Amateurs
- 2005 HLA Saujana Open Amateur Championship (Malaysia)

== Professional wins (2) ==
=== Challenge Tour wins (2) ===
No.	Date	Tournament	Winning score	Margin of victory	Runner(s)-up
1	3 Aug 2008	Challenge of Ireland	−8 (71-71-71-67=280)	1 stroke	(England) Richard Bland, (Scotland) David Drysdale
2	29 May 2011	Telenet Trophy	−8 (70-72-72-66=280)	1 stroke	(England) Oliver Whiteley

Challenge Tour playoff record (0–1)

No.	Year	Tournament	Opponent	Result
1	2009	Apulia San Domenico Grand Final	(Scotland) Peter Whiteford	Lost to birdie on first extra hole

== Team appearances ==
Amateur

- Nomura Cup (representing Australia): 2005 (winners)
- Eisenhower Trophy (representing Australia): 2006
- Australian Men's Interstate Teams Matches (representing Victoria): 2002, 2003 (winners), 2004, 2005

== See also ==
- 2006 European Tour Qualifying School graduates
- 2009 Challenge Tour graduates
