= Julien Guerrier =

French professional golfer

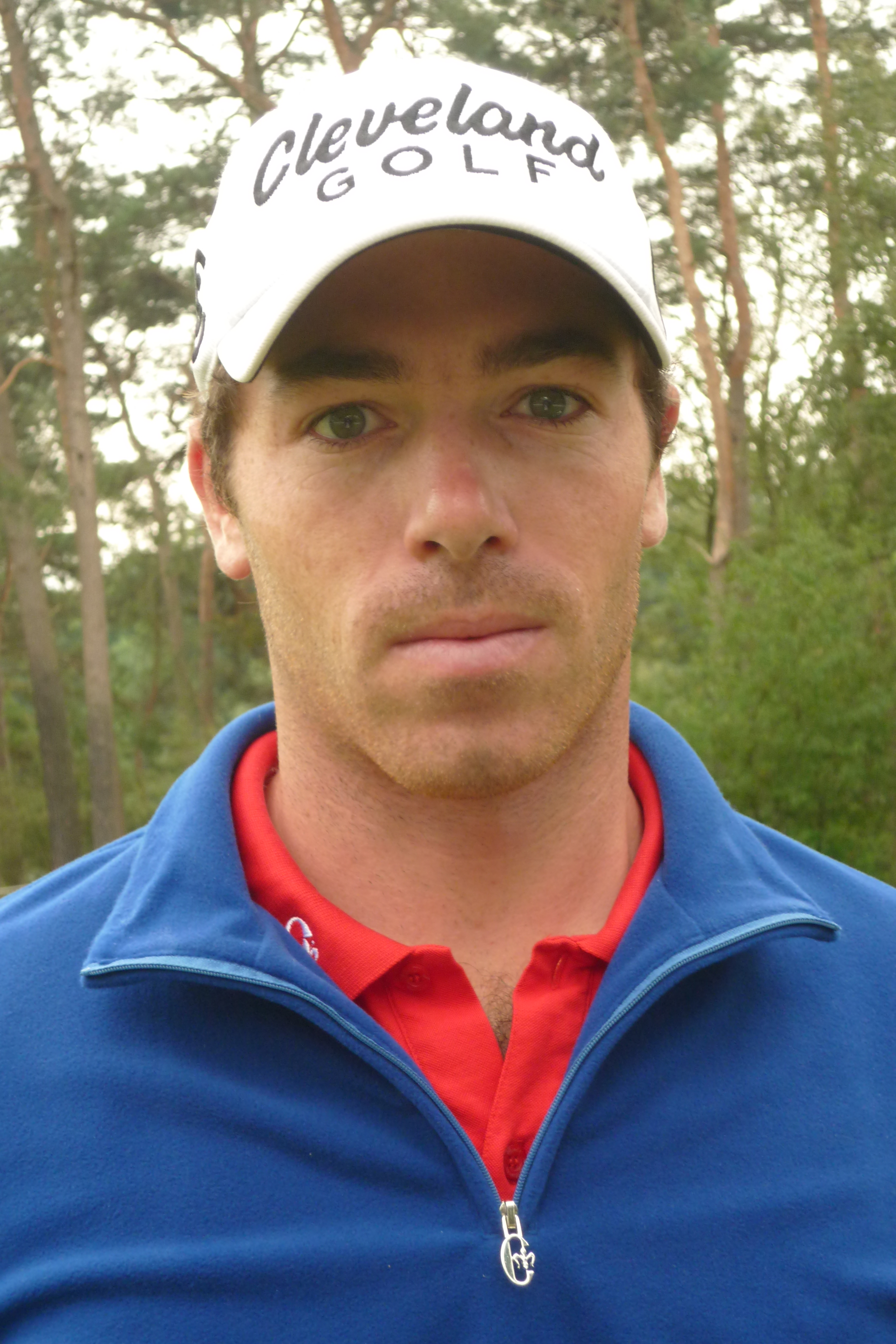

Personal information
- Nationality: France
- Born: 1 July 1985 (age 41) Évreux, France
- Height: 1.84 m (6 ft 0 in)
- Weight: 80 kg (176 lb; 12 st 8 lb)

Career
- Sport: Golf
- Turned professional: 2007
- Current tour: European Tour
- Former tours: Challenge Tour; Alps Tour
- Professional wins: 7

Number of wins by tour
- European Tour: 1
- Challenge Tour: 2
- Other: 4

Best results in major championships
- Masters Tournament: CUT: 2007
- PGA Championship: DNP
- U.S. Open: DNP
- The Open Championship: CUT: 2006

Julien Guerrier (born 1 July 1985) is a French professional golfer who plays on the European Tour. He won the 2006 Amateur Championship.

== Amateur career ==
Guerrier was born in Évreux. He had a successful amateur career, which included winning The Amateur Championship in 2006 at Royal St George's Golf Club. He turned professional after competing in the 2007 Masters Tournament.

== Professional career ==
Guerrier finished third on the Alps Tour Order of Merit in 2008 to graduate to the second tier Challenge Tour for 2009. He again progressed, finishing 16th on the 2009 Challenge Tour Rankings to earn a European Tour card for 2010, although he later improved his exemption category at qualifying school, recording a record low round of 60 in the process. He failed to retain his card after the 2010 European Tour and returned to the Challenge Tour for 2011. At the end of 2011 he qualified to play on the European Tour for 2012, but failed to retain his card for a second time.

After a number of season on the Challenge Tour, Guerrier has his first successes in 2017, winning the Hauts de France Golf Open and the Irish Challenge. Finishing 6th in the Order of Merit he returned to the European Tour for 2018. Guerrier had a good start to 2018, finishing third in the Oman Open. He finished 2018 at 86th in the money list to retain his card for 2019. Guerrier missed most of 2019 through injury, only returning in September.

After 230 starts, Guerrier won his first European Tour event in 2024 at the Estrella Damm N.A. Andalucía Masters, beating Jorge Campillo in a nine-hole playoff, tying the record for longest playoff with the 1989 KLM Dutch Open and 2013 Open de España.

== Amateur wins ==
- 2005 Coupe Mouchy
- 2006 The Amateur Championship

== Professional wins (7) ==
=== European Tour wins (1) ===
No.	Date	Tournament	Winning score	Margin of victory	Runner-up
1	20 Oct 2024	Estrella Damm N.A. Andalucía Masters	−21 (62-72-63-70=267)	Playoff	(Spain) Jorge Campillo

European Tour playoff record (1–0)

No.	Year	Tournament	Opponent	Result
1	2024	Estrella Damm N.A. Andalucía Masters	(Spain) Jorge Campillo	Won with par on ninth extra hole

=== Challenge Tour wins (2) ===
No.	Date	Tournament	Winning score	Margin of victory	Runners-up
1	18 Jun 2017	Hauts de France Golf Open	−7 (70-70-67-70=277)	1 stroke	(Scotland) Jack Doherty, (Italy) Lorenzo Gagli, (Portugal) Ricardo Santos
2	17 Sep 2017	Irish Challenge	−17 (71-68-65-67=271)	6 strokes	(Norway) Jarand Ekeland Arnøy, (England) Steven Brown, (Sweden) Oscar Lengdén

Challenge Tour playoff record (0–2)

No.	Year	Tournament	Opponent(s)	Result
1	2009	SK Golf Challenge	(Belgium) Nicolas Colsaerts, (Wales) Rhys Davies	Colsaerts won with birdie on second extra hole
2	2011	Fred Olsen Challenge de España	(England) Matthew Baldwin	Lost to par on third extra hole

=== Alps Tour wins (2) ===
No.	Date	Tournament	Winning score	Margin of victory	Runner-up
1	16 Mar 2007	Open CDG Développement (as an amateur)	−9 (67-73-67=207)	3 strokes	(France) Julien Grillon
2	31 Aug 2008	AGF-Allianz Open - Trophee Preven's	−15 (65-66-66-72=269)	2 strokes	(France) Raphaël Pellicioli

=== French Tour wins (2) ===
No.	Date	Tournament	Winning score	Margin of victory	Runner(s)-up
1	7 Apr 2012	Grand Prix Schweppes	−17 (67-70-69-65=271)	1 stroke	(France) Sophie Giquel-Bettan
2	7 Apr 2024	Championnat de France Professionnel MCA	−9 (64-69-68=201)	1 stroke	(France) Franck Daux, (France) David Ravetto

== Results in major championships ==
Tournament	2006	2007	2025
Masters Tournament		CUT	
U.S. Open			
The Open Championship	CUT		CUT
PGA Championship			

Did not play

CUT = missed the half-way cut

== Team appearances ==
Amateur

- European Boys' Team Championship (representing France): 2002
- European Youths' Team Championship (representing France): 2004, 2006
- Eisenhower Trophy (representing France): 2004, 2006
- European Amateur Team Championship (representing France): 2005
- Bonallack Trophy (representing Europe): 2006 (winners)
- St Andrews Trophy (representing the Continent of Europe): 2006

Professional

- Team Cup (representing Continental Europe): 2025

== See also ==
- 2009 Challenge Tour graduates
- 2009 European Tour Qualifying School graduates
- 2011 European Tour Qualifying School graduates
- 2017 Challenge Tour graduates
