= 2006 Eisenhower Trophy =

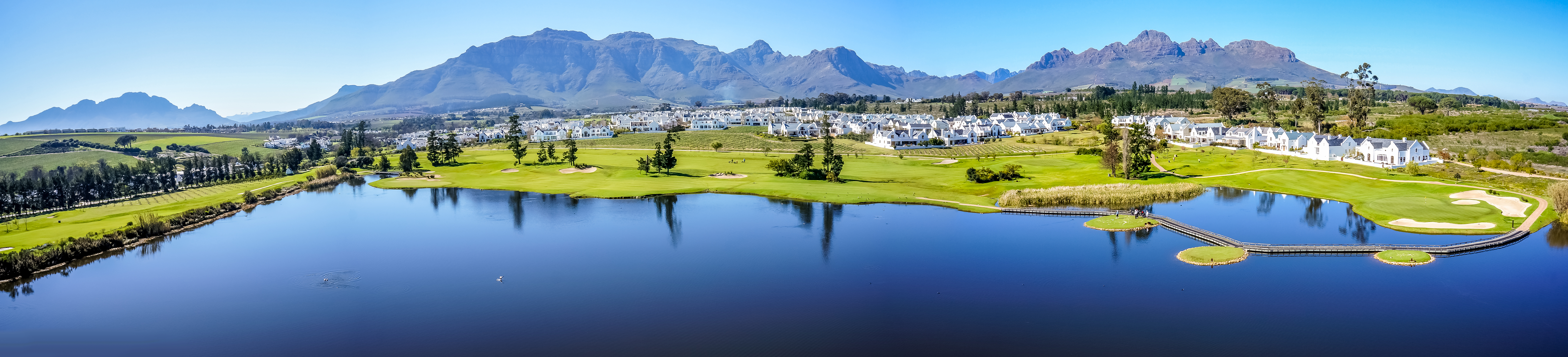
- DeZalze Golf Estate

Tournament information
- Dates: 26–29 October
- Location: Stellenbosch, South Africa; 33°56′12″S 18°51′41″E
- Courses: De Zalze Golf Club; Stellenbosch Golf Club
- Format: 72 holes stroke play

Statistics
- Par: 72 (De Zalze); 72 (Stellenbosch)
- Field: 70 teams 208 players

Champion
- Netherlands; Wil Besseling, Joost Luiten & Tim Sluiter
- 554 (−22)
- Location in South Africa Location in Western Cape

The 2006 Eisenhower Trophy took place 26–29 October at De Zalze Golf Club and Stellenbosch Golf Club in Stellenbosch, east of Cape Town, South Africa. It was the 25th World Amateur Team Championship for the Eisenhower Trophy. The tournament was a 72-hole stroke play team event with 70 three-man teams. The best two scores for each round counted towards the team total. Each team played two rounds on the two courses. The leading teams played at Stellenbosch Golf Club on the third day and at De Zalze Golf Club on the final day.

The Netherlands won their first Eisenhower Trophy, two strokes ahead of Canada, who took the silver medal. The United States took the bronze medal while Wales finished in fourth place. Wil Besseling had the best 72-hole aggregate of 275, 13 under par. In the last round Joost Luiten had four birdies and an eagle in his last five holes to finish with a 67. He birdied the par-five 14th and then holed a sand-wedge for an eagle two on the 15th and made birdies on the final three holes.

The 2006 Espirito Santo Trophy was played on the same courses one week prior.

== Teams ==
70 teams contested the event. Each team had three played with the exception of Bosnia and Herzegovina and Mauritius who only has two.

The following table lists the players on the leading teams.

Country	Players
Argentina	Estanislao Goya, Sebastián Saavedra, Alan Wagner
Australia	Stephen Dartnall, Won Joon Lee, Andrew Tampion
Canada	James Love, Andrew Parr, Richard Scott
Denmark	Peter Baunsoe, Christoffer Christiansen, Mark Haastrup
England	Oliver Fisher, Ross McGowan, Jamie Moul
France	Julien Grillon, Julien Guerrier, Jean-Jacques Wolff
Germany	Sean Einhaus, Florian Fritsch, Stephan Gross
Ireland	Rory McIlroy, Gareth Shaw, Simon Ward
Japan	Yuta Ikeda, Yuki Ito, Yuki Usami
Malaysia	Ben Leong, S. Sivachandran, Mohammed Sukree Rhasid
Mexico	Roberto Díaz, Mauricio Tamez, Julian Valenciana
Netherlands	Wil Besseling, Joost Luiten, Tim Sluiter
New Zealand	Josh Geary, James Gill, Mark Purser
Scotland	Scott Jamieson, George Murray, Richie Ramsay
South Korea	Kang Sung-hoon, Kim Do-hoon, Kim Kyung-tae
Spain	José Luis Adarraga, Jordi García, Pablo Martín
Sweden	Björn Åkesson, Oscar Florén, Niklas Lemke
Switzerland	Steven Rojas, Damian Ulrich, Tino Weiss
United States	Chris Kirk, Jonathan Moore, Trip Kuehne
Wales	Llewellyn Matthews, Rhys Davies, Nigel Edwards

== Results ==
Place	Country	Score	To par
1st place, gold medalist(s)	Netherlands	141-140-136-137=554	−22
2nd place, silver medalist(s)	Canada	139-139-141-137=556	−20
3rd place, bronze medalist(s)	United States	143-136-140-138=557	−19
4	Wales	144-143-132-140=559	−17
5	South Korea	146-137-138-140=561	−15
T6	Argentina	148-142-134-139=563	−13
T6	England	149-138-140-136=563	−13
T6	Scotland	144-142-137-140=563	−13
T9	France	142-142-141-139=564	−12
T9	Ireland	146-138-140-140=564	−12
11	Spain	145-141-144-135=565	−11
T12	Australia	147-141-140-141=569	−7
T12	Germany	146-141-146-136=569	−7
T12	Mexico	143-138-145-143=569	−7
T12	Sweden	150-132-141-146=569	−7
T16	Japan	145-139-145-141=570	−6
T16	Switzerland	146-143-143-138=570	−6
18	Malaysia	143-142-145-141=571	−5
T19	Denmark	145-143-137-147=572	−4
T19	New Zealand	148-138-145-141=572	−4
21	Portugal	145-143-142-143=573	-3
T22	Belgium	150-140-139-145=574	−2
T22	Colombia	148-148-140-138=574	−2
T22	Norway	146-143-138-147=574	−2
T22	South Africa	143-145-138-148=574	−2
T26	Chinese Taipei	147-140-142-146=575	−1
T26	Finland	145-146-142-142=575	−1
28	Chile	147-143-142-144=576	E
29	Italy	147-142-142-146=577	+1
30	Austria	143-141-148-146=578	+2
31	Brazil	146-152-140-146=584	+8
T32	Czech Republic	152-145-143-145=585	+9
T32	India	148-143-143-151=585	+9
34	Iceland	151-145-147-147=590	+14
35	Trinidad and Tobago	147-146-148-152=593	+17
36	Puerto Rico	152-146-143-153=594	+18
37	Bolivia	158-146-143-149=596	+20
38	Philippines	154-150-154-141=599	+23
T39	Bermuda	154-150-152-147=603	+27
T39	Hong Kong	153-152-148-150=603	+27
41	Russia	149-153-151-152=605	+29
42	Pakistan	156-148-155-147=606	+30
43	Zimbabwe	147-156-155-149=607	+31
44	Turkey	161-152-148-150=611	+35
T45	Ecuador	161-153-155-144=613	+37
T45	El Salvador	149-156-158-150=613	+37
T45	Peru	157-148-158-150=613	+37
48	Guatemala	159-151-158-146=614	+38
49	Namibia	149-155-159-153=616	+40
50	Tunisia	156-155-156-151=618	+42
51	Venezuela	154-148-164-154=620	+44
52	Fiji	155-156-153-158=622	+46
53	Uruguay	155-159-156-156=626	+50
54	Latvia	165-156-153-154=628	+52
55	Estonia	163-158-157-152=630	+54
56	Slovakia	167-161-151-155=634	+58
57	Greece	163-160-160-152=635	+59
58	Egypt	159-164-163-152=638	+62
59	Honduras	155-158-173-161=647	+71
T60	Botswana	165-168-161-154=648	+72
T60	United States Virgin Islands	161-164-168-155=648	+72
62	Ivory Coast	170-168-162-155=655	+79
63	United Arab Emirates	174-172-162-149=657	+81
64	Saudi Arabia	176-162-162-159=659	+83
65	Croatia	173-169-162-169=673	+97
66	Gabon	187-169-169-174=699	+123
67	Bulgaria	190-176-167-169=702	+126
68	Bosnia and Herzegovina	180-173-180-171=704	+128
69	Nigeria	198-178-175-174=725	+149
70	Mauritius	196-198-193-187=774	+198

== Individual leaders ==
There was no official recognition for the lowest individual scores.

Place	Player	Country	Score	To par
1	Wil Besseling	Netherlands	69-70-66-70=275	−13
T2	Julien Grillon	France	72-68-69-67=276	−12
T2	Chris Kirk	United States	71-66-70-69=276	−12
T2	Richard Scott	Canada	69-68-71-68=276	−12
5	Oliver Fisher	England	74-66-70-67=277	−11
6	Kang Sung-hoon	South Korea	73-67-68-72=280	−8
T7	Pablo Martín	Spain	73-71-70-67=281	−7
T7	Rory McIlroy	Ireland	73-69-72-67=281	−7
T9	Nigel Edwards	Wales	75-70-68-69=282	−6
T9	Joost Luiten	Netherlands	74-71-70-67=282	−6
T9	George Murray	Scotland	72-70-70-70=282	−6
T9	Richie Ramsay	Scotland	72-73-67-70=282	−6
