= Colombia Masters =

Golf tournament in Colombia

Coordinates: 4.712127°N 74.040384°W

Club Colombia Masters
Tournament information
- Location: Bogotá, Colombia
- Established: 2007
- Course: Country Club de Bogotá
- Par: 72
- Length: 7,109 yards (6,500 m)
- Tours: Challenge Tour; Tour de las Américas
- Format: Stroke play
- Prize fund: US$200,000
- Month played: March
- Final year: 2009

Tournament record score
- Aggregate: 268 Wil Besseling (2008)
- To par: −16 as above

Final champion
- (Argentina) Alan Wagner
- Location in Colombia

The Club Colombia Masters was a golf tournament co-sanctioned by the European Challenge Tour and the Tour de las Américas and was first played in 2007. The event was held at the Country Club de Bogotá, in Bogotá, Colombia. The tournament was organized by the Corporacion Internacional de Golf, managed by German Calle Jr. and Jorge Muñoz. This was the first golf tournament ever to be sanctioned by the European Challenge Tour in Colombia. In 2010 it was replaced on the schedule by the Copa Antioquia, held in Medellín.

== 2007 ==
The first tournament was won by Edoardo Molinari from Italy. Molinari, the 2005 U.S. Amateur champion, had turned professional the year before and was trying to get onto a tour when he was invited to play in Bogotá. Molinari and Gustavo Mendoza, a local player, entered a sudden-death play-off which was settled on the second extra hole after their fourth round scores left them tied at the top of the leaderboard on five under par (269). For this first professional win Molinari received €21,690 and the right to play on the European Challenge Tour, the lower tier of the European Tour.

"This is incredible," Molinari smiled. "It was quite a spectacular week. I'm very happy about this victory, because I worked hard for it during the winter. I'm going to enjoy it."

== 2008 ==
The second Club Colombia Masters was won by Dutchman Wil Besseling in a seven shot victory with a 16 under par total of 268. Besseling picked up the winner’s cheque for €18,303 which moved him from 41st to sixth place on the European Challenge Tour Rankings.

“I started very well and my swing felt good all day,” he said. “I struggled a little yesterday, but today it was really good. I didn’t make any mistakes and it feels great to be the winner. Although I had a lead, I just tried to keep playing one shot at a time,” he added. “The guys made some bogeys behind me and that made the gap even bigger but I just kept playing my own game and it all worked out perfectly. It feels awesome."

== 2009 ==
The 2009 Colombia Masters was the only tournament of the season co-sanctioned by the European Challenge Tour and the Tour de las Americas. Colombian golfer Camilo Villegas had a 9 hole demonstration on the Tuesday prior to the tournament where he played with his brother Manuel. Large crowds came to the Country Club de Bogota for Villegas only presentation of the year in his home country.

Teenager Alan Wagner from Argentina clinched his maiden Challenge Tour title on the final day when the lead changed hands several times. Wagner eventually emerged triumphant after a round of 68 to close on 13 under par. The 19-year-old received a winner’s cheque for US$24,802 and finished at the top of the Challenge Tour Rankings and one shot in front of his nearest challenger Edoardo Molinari of Italy, the 2007 winner.

== Winners ==
Year	Tours (Note: CHA − Challenge Tour; TLA − Tour de las Américas.)	Winner	Score	To par	Margin of victory	Runner(s)-up
2009	CHA, TLA	(Argentina) Alan Wagner	275	−13	1 stroke	(Italy) Edoardo Molinari
2008	CHA, TLA	(Netherlands) Wil Besseling	268	−16	7 strokes	(Finland) Antti Ahokas (Denmark) Mark Haastrup
2007	CHA, TLA	(Italy) Edoardo Molinari	279	−5	Playoff	(Colombia) Gustavo Mendoza
