= Robert Coles (golfer) =

English professional golfer (born 1972)

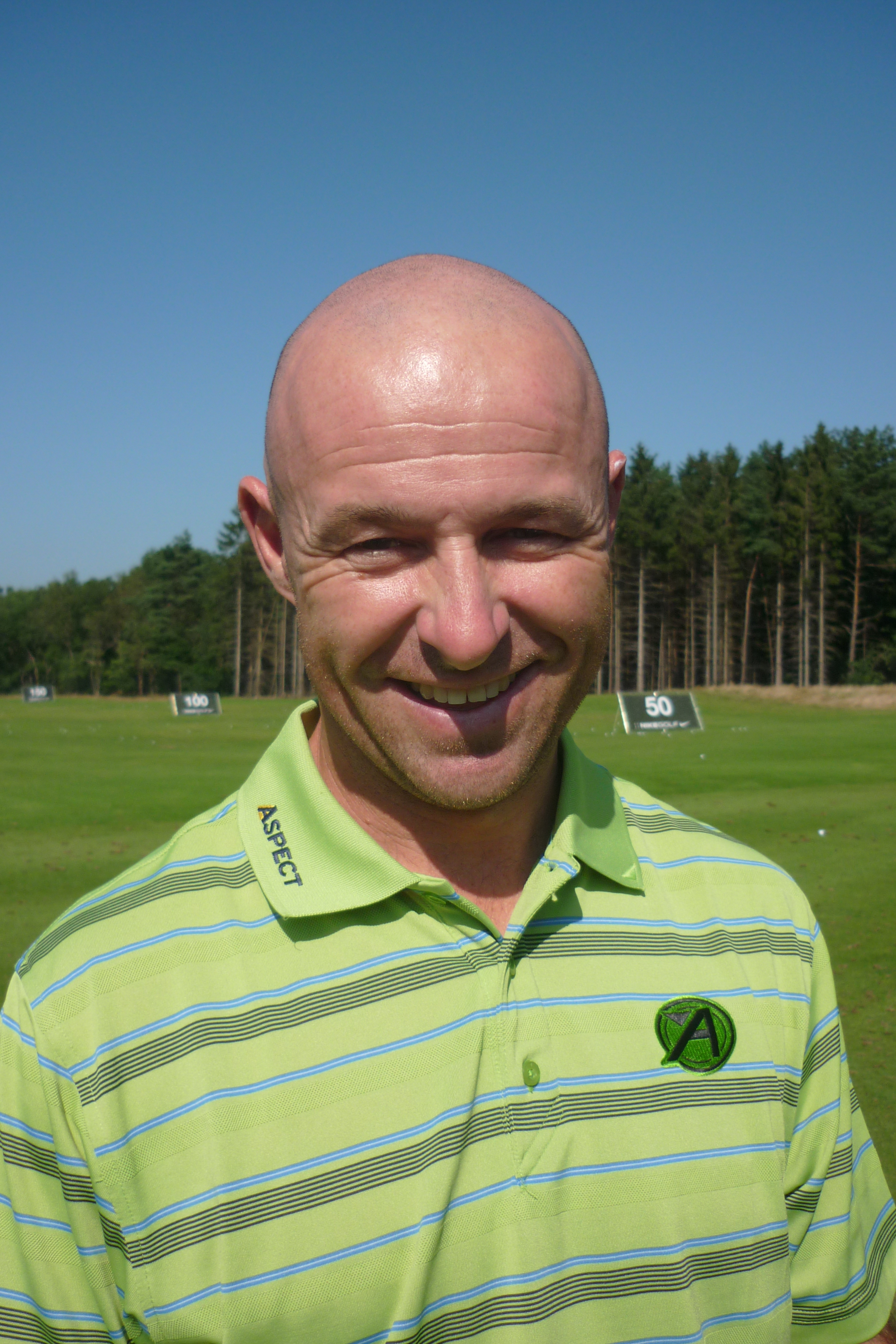

Personal information
- Full name: Robert Anthony Coles
- Nationality: England
- Born: 2 September 1972 (age 54) Hornchurch, England
- Height: 5 ft 8 in (1.73 m)
- Weight: 168 lb (76 kg; 12.0 st)

Career
- Sport: Golf
- Turned professional: 1994
- Current tour: European Senior Tour
- Former tours: European Tour; Challenge Tour
- Professional wins: 6

Number of wins by tour
- Challenge Tour: 3
- European Senior Tour: 1
- Other: 2

Best results in major championships
- Masters Tournament: DNP
- PGA Championship: DNP
- U.S. Open: DNP
- The Open Championship: CUT: 2001, 2003, 2005

Robert Anthony Coles (born 2 September 1972) is an English professional golfer who formerly played on the European Tour.

== Career ==
Coles was born in Hornchurch, England. He turned professional in 1994.

Coles has won three times on the Challenge Tour, once at the 2003 BA-CA Golf Open (Austrian Open) and twice in 2009, at the Moroccan Classic by Banque Populaire and the Challenge of Ireland. The Austrian Open at the time was a Challenge Tour event, but has since become a European Tour event. He has finished on the top 100 on the European Tour Order of Merit three times, in 2004, 2005 and 2011. He lost his card in 2006 and returned to the Challenge Tour. He returned to the European Tour in 2010. He has amassed over one million euros in career earnings. In February 2011, Coles finished runner-up at the Avantha Masters to Shiv Chawrasia. The pair were tied going into the par-five 18th, however Coles made bogey allowing Chawrasia to take the tournament with a par.

In May 2024, Coles won the Senior PGA Professional Championship at Moor Park, Hertfordshire in a play-off with David Higgins and Stephen Fenn, after finishing with a three-round total of −5 (73-65-70=208).

== Professional wins (6) ==
=== Challenge Tour wins (3) ===
No.	Date	Tournament	Winning score	Margin of victory	Runner-up
1	7 Sep 2003	BA-CA Golf Open	−13 (70-67-70-68=275)	Playoff	(Australia) Steven Bowditch
2	3 May 2009	Moroccan Classic	−13 (69-67-71-68=275)	4 strokes	(Australia) Matthew Zions
3	14 Jun 2009	Challenge of Ireland	−10 (68-69-74-67=278)	Playoff	(Belgium) Nicolas Colsaerts

Challenge Tour playoff record (2–2)

No.	Year	Tournament	Opponent(s)	Result
1	2003	BA-CA Golf Open	(Australia) Steven Bowditch	Won with birdie on first extra hole
2	2003	Ryder Cup Wales Challenge	(England) Robert Rock, (England) Sam Walker, (Wales) Craig Williams	Williams won with birdie on first extra hole
3	2009	Challenge of Ireland	(Belgium) Nicolas Colsaerts	Won with birdie on third extra hole
4	2015	SSE Scottish Hydro Challenge	(Thailand) Prom Meesawat, (England) Jack Senior	Senior won with birdie on fourth extra hole

=== Other wins (2) ===
- 2017 PGA Play-offs
- 2024 Senior PGA Professional Championship

=== European Senior Tour wins (1) ===
No.	Date	Tournament	Winning score	Margin of victory	Runner-up
1	4 Aug 2024	Staysure PGA Seniors Championship	−4 (69-69-75-71=284)	1 stroke	(Scotland) Paul Lawrie

== Results in major championships ==
Tournament	2001	2002	2003	2004	2005
The Open Championship	CUT		CUT		CUT

Did not play

CUT = missed the halfway cut
Note: Coles only played in The Open Championship.

== Team appearances ==
Professional

- PGA Cup (representing Great Britain and Ireland): 2017 (winners), 2019

== See also ==
- 2009 Challenge Tour graduates
