= Clément Charmasson =

French professional golfer (born 2004)

Personal information
- Nationality: France
- Born: 25 January 1999 (age 27) Toulouse, France

Career
- Sport: Golf
- College: University of Central Florida
- Turned professional: 2023
- Current tour: Challenge Tour
- Former tours: European Tour; Pro Golf Tour
- Professional wins: 1

Number of wins by tour
- Challenge Tour: 1

Clément Charmasson (born 25 January 1999) is a French professional golfer. He won the 2025 Challenge de España.

== Amateur career ==
Charmasson was born in Toulouse in 1999. His breakthrough as an amateur came as he reached the semi-finals of the 2016 Internationaux de France U18 - Trophee Carlhian at Golf de Saint-Germain.

He played for the national team and helped France secure a silver at the 2021 European Amateur Team Championship at PGA Catalunya in Spain, where he beat David Puig on the 21st hole in the semi-final against Spain, for a final score of 4–3 and a final against Denmark.

Charmasson attended the University of Central Florida for five years from 2018 to 2022, playing for the UCF Knights men's golf team.

== Professional career ==
Charmasson turned professional after Q-School in 2023 and joined the 2024 Pro Golf Tour. After five top-4 finishes, he was promoted to the Challenge Tour at the end of the season.

On the 2025 Challenge Tour, Charmasson won the Challenge de España by a stroke over Victor Sidal Svendsen in only his 5th start.

He was promoted to the 2026 European Tour at the end of the season where he struggled, with 9 cuts made in 21 starts, and was back on the Challenge Tour for 2027.

== Amateur wins ==
- 2016 Open du Bassin d'Arcachon
- 2017 Grand Prix de PACA

== Professional wins (1) ==
=== Challenge Tour wins (1) ===
No.	Date	Tournament	Winning score	Margin of victory	Runner-up
1	11 May 2025	Challenge de España	−17 (65-67-66-69=267)	1 stroke	(Denmark) Victor Sidal Svendsen

== Team appearances ==
Amateur

- Junior Golf World Cup (representing France): 2017
- European Boys' Team Championship (representing France): 2017
- European Nations Cup – Copa Sotogrande (representing France): 2017
- European Amateur Team Championship (representing France): 2019, 2021

== See also ==
- 2025 Challenge Tour graduates
