= SK Golf Challenge =

Tournament information
- Location: Vanajanlinna, Finland
- Established: 2008
- Course: Linna Golf
- Par: 72
- Length: 7,245 yards (6,625 m)
- Tour: Challenge Tour
- Format: Stroke play
- Prize fund: €175,000
- Month played: August
- Final year: 2009

Tournament record score
- Aggregate: 271 Simon Robinson (2008)
- To par: −13 as above

Final champion
- (Belgium) Nicolas Colsaerts
- Location in Finland

The SK Golf Challenge was a golf tournament on the Challenge Tour played in Finland. It was founded in 2008, and in 2010 was retitled as the Green Challenge before being cancelled due to the withdrawal of a major sponsor.

== Winners ==
| Year | Winner | Score | To par | Margin of victory | Runners-up | Venue |
Green Challenge
| 2010 | Cancelled | | | | | Hirsala Golf |
SK Golf Challenge
| 2009 | (Belgium) Nicolas Colsaerts | 277 | −11 | Playoff | (Wales) Rhys Davies (France) Julien Guerrier | Linna Golf |
| 2008 | (England) Simon Robinson | 271 | −13 | 6 strokes | (Australia) John Wade (England) Andrew Willey | St Laurence Golf |
