= Challenge of Ireland =

Tournament information
- Location: County Kildare, Ireland
- Established: 2005
- Courses: Moyvalley Hotel & Country Club
- Par: 72
- Length: 7,370 yards (6,740 m)
- Tour: Challenge Tour
- Format: Stroke play
- Prize fund: €150,000
- Month played: June
- Final year: 2009

Tournament record score
- Aggregate: 261 John Wade (2006)
- To par: −19 as above

Final champion
- (England) Robert Coles
- Location in Ireland

The Challenge of Ireland was a golf tournament on the Challenge Tour, held in Ireland. It was played from 2005 to 2009.

Robert Coles won the 2009 event in a playoff over Belgian Nicolas Colsaerts.

== Winners ==
Year	Winner	Score	To par	Margin of victory	Runner(s)-up	Venue
Challenge of Ireland
2009	(England) Robert Coles	278	−10	Playoff	(Belgium) Nicolas Colsaerts	Moyvalley
2008	(Australia) Andrew Tampion	280	−8	1 stroke	(England) Richard Bland (Scotland) David Drysdale	Glasson
2007	(Sweden) Magnus A. Carlsson	278	−10	1 stroke	(France) Mike Lorenzo-Vera (Argentina) Julio Zapata	Glasson
Ireland Ryder Cup Challenge
2006	(Australia) John Wade	261	−19	1 stroke	(Argentina) Sebastián Fernández (Republic of Ireland) Michael McGeady	Killarney
2005	(Scotland) Marc Warren	272	−16	Playoff	(Scotland) Peter Whiteford	Killarney

== See also ==
- Irish Challenge, a Challenge Tour event held in Ireland which began in 2015
