= Peter Whiteford =

Scottish professional golfer

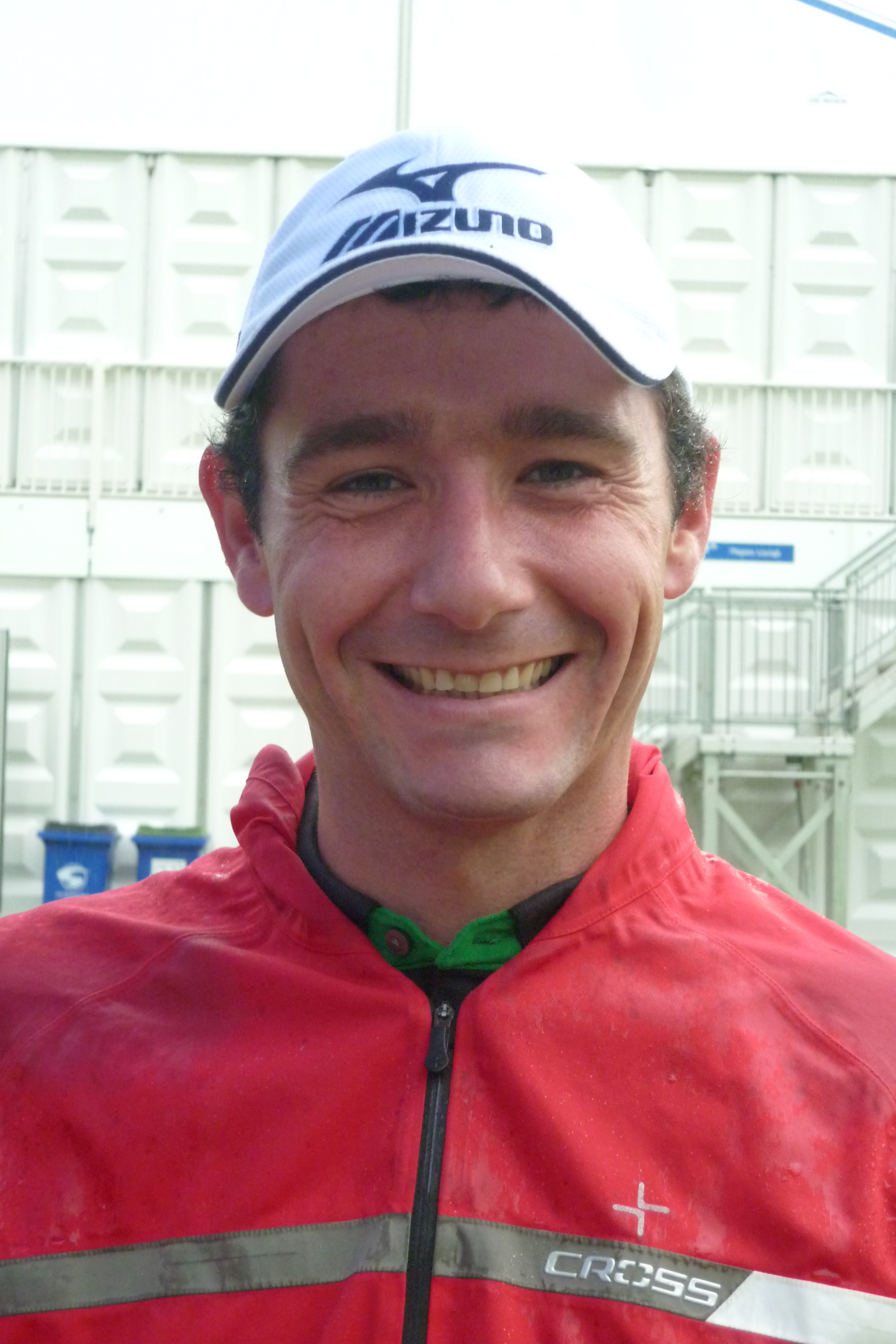

Personal information
- Full name: Peter William Whiteford
- Nationality: Scotland
- Born: 3 August 1980 (age 46) Kirkcaldy, Scotland
- Height: 5 ft 10 in (1.78 m)
- Weight: 160 lb (73 kg; 11 st)
- Spouse: Gabriella

Career
- Sport: Golf
- Turned professional: 2002
- Current tour: Challenge Tour
- Former tour: European Tour
- Professional wins: 5

Number of wins by tour
- Challenge Tour: 3

Best results in major championships
- Masters Tournament: DNP
- PGA Championship: DNP
- U.S. Open: DNP
- The Open Championship: CUT: 2011

Peter William Whiteford (born 3 August 1980) is a Scottish professional golfer.

== Career ==
Whiteford was born in Kirkcaldy. He turned professional in 2002.

Whiteford won twice on PGA EuroPro Tour from 2002 to 2003 and has played on the Challenge and European Tours since then. He won twice on the Challenge Tour in 2007 and once in 2009. Since 2010, he has established himself on the European Tour and Challenge tour. As of 2019, Whiteford is a golf coach focused on performance and the short game.

== Amateur wins ==
- 1996 Scottish Boys Under 16 Stroke Play Championship

== Professional wins (5) ==
=== Challenge Tour wins (3) ===
Legend
Tour Championships (1)
Other Challenge Tour (2)

| No. | Date | Tournament | Winning score | Margin of victory | Runner-up |
|---|---|---|---|---|---|
| 1 | 30 Sep 2007 | Dutch Futures | −13 (69-70-63-73=275) | 2 strokes | (France) François Delamontagne |
| 2 | 14 Oct 2007 | Doc Salbe PGA European Challenge | −22 (66-66-68-66=266) | 4 strokes | (Scotland) Richie Ramsay |
| 3 | 31 Oct 2009 | Apulia San Domenico Grand Final | −5 (70-73-69-67=279) | Playoff | (Australia) Andrew Tampion |

Challenge Tour playoff record (1–1)

| No. | Year | Tournament | Opponent | Result |
|---|---|---|---|---|
| 1 | 2005 | Ireland Ryder Cup Challenge | (Scotland) Marc Warren | Lost to par on third extra hole |
| 2 | 2009 | Apulia San Domenico Grand Final | (Australia) Andrew Tampion | Won with birdie on first extra hole |

=== PGA EuroPro Tour wins (2) ===
| No. | Date | Tournament | Winning score | Margin of victory | Runner(s)-up |
|---|---|---|---|---|---|
| 1 | 2 Aug 2002 | Morley Hayes Open | −13 (69-71-63=203) | 4 strokes | (England) Phillip Archer, (England) Carl Richardson |
| 2 | 20 Jun 2003 | Quinta da Marinha Oitavos | −7 (67-70-69=206) | 2 strokes | (England) Michael Welch |

== Playoff record ==
European Tour playoff record (0–1)

| No. | Year | Tournament | Opponents | Result |
|---|---|---|---|---|
| 1 | 2013 | Ballantine's Championship | (Australia) Marcus Fraser, (Australia) Brett Rumford | Rumford won with eagle on first extra hole |

== Results in major championships ==
| Tournament | 2011 |
|---|---|
| The Open Championship | CUT |

CUT = missed the halfway cut
Note: Whiteford only played in The Open Championship.

== Team appearances ==
Amateur

- European Boys' Team Championship (representing Scotland): 1997

== See also ==
- 2007 Challenge Tour graduates
- 2009 Challenge Tour graduates
