= 2005 European Amateur Team Championship =

Golf competition

Tournament information
- Dates: 28 June – 2 July 2005
- Location: Southport, England, United Kingdom; 53.620°N 3.028°W
- Course: Hillside Golf Club
- Organized by: European Golf Association
- Format: Qualification round: 36 holes stroke play Knock-out match-play

Statistics
- Par: 72
- Length: 6,850 yards (6,260 m)
- Field: 20 teams 120 players

Champion
- England; Oliver Fisher, Gary Lockerbie, Jamie Moul, Matthew Richardson, Steven Tiley, Gary Wolstenholme
- Qualification round: 704 (−16); Final match: 6–1

Location map
- Location in Europe Location on the British Isles Location in England Location in Southport

The 2005 European Amateur Team Championship took place 28 June – 2 July at Hillside Golf Club in Southport, England. It was the 24th men's golf European Amateur Team Championship.

== Venue ==
The club was founded in 1911. The course, located in Southport, 20 kilometres north of the city center of Liverpool, England, is a links course, with all the holes being between and on mainly large dunes and local indigenous pinewoods, typical of the area. It is physically close to both the Royal Birkdale Golf Club, near its south-western boundaries, and to the Southport and Ainsdale Golf Club.

== Format ==
Each team consisted of 6 players, playing two rounds of stroke-play over two days, counting the five best scores each day for each team.

The eight best teams formed flight A, in knock-out match-play over the next three days. The teams were seeded based on their positions after the stroke play. The first placed team were drawn to play the quarter-final against the eight placed team, the second against the seventh, the third against the sixth and the fourth against the fifth. Teams were allowed to use six players during the team matches, selecting four of them in the two morning foursome games and five players in to the afternoon single games. Teams knocked out after the quarter-finals played one foursome game and four single games in each of their remaining matches. Games all square at the 18th hole were declared halved, if the team match was already decided.

The eight teams placed 9–16 in the qualification stroke-play formed flight B, to play similar knock-out play, with one foursome game and four single games in each match, to decide their final positions.

The four teams placed 17–20 formed flight C, to play each other in a round-robin system, with one foursome game and four single games in each match, to decide their final positions.

== Teams ==
20 nation teams contested the event, the same nations as at the previous event two years earlier. Each team consisted of six players.

Country	Players
Austria	Kajetan Kromer, Anton Ortner, Peter Lepitschnik, Florian Praegant, Roland Steiner, Bernd Wiesberger
Belgium	Yannick Bode, Rutger Dhondt, Hervé Gevers, Pierre Relecom, Guillaume Watremez, Sebastien Wulf
Czech Republic	Ondrej Lebl, Petr Nic, Marek Novy, Jakum Stanislav, Roman Svoboda, Lukas Tintera
Denmark	Janik Bolinder, Peter Baunsee, Philip Drost, Mark Haastrup, Christoffer Lang, Peter Meldegaard
England	Oliver Fisher, Gary Lockerbie, Jamie Moul, Matthew Richardson, Steven Tiley, Gary Wolstenholme
Finland	Antti Ahokas, Peter Erofejeff, Joonas Granberg, Jarmo Hovila, Tommi Laitto, Heikki Mantyla
France	François Calmels, Sebastien Clement, Julien Forêt, Joachim Fourquet, Julien Guerrier, Mike Lorenzo-Vera
Germany	Florian Fritsch, Martin Kaymer, Stefan Kirstein, Benjamin Miarka, Christian Schunck, Christopher Trunzer
Iceland	Heidar Bragason, Örn Ævar Hjartarson, Magnus Larusson, Sigmundur Einar Masson, Otto Sigurdsson, Stefan Mar Stefansson
Ireland	Jim Carvill, Darren Crowe, Rory McIlroy, Brian McElhinney, Michael McGeady, Sean McTernan
Italy	Simone Brizzolari, Matteo Delpodio, Lorenzo Gagli, Edoardo Molinari, Andrea Romano, Andrea Signor
Netherlands	Wil Besseling, Jan Willem van Hoof, Joost Luiten, Robert Niemer, Taco Remkes, Robin Swane
Norway	Petter Enger, Johann Gudjonsson, Eirik-Tage Johansen, Kim Kristoffersen, Marcus Leandersson, Torstein Nevestad
Portugal	Goncalo Brito, Salvador Castro, Tiago Cruz, Pedro Figueiredo, Antonio Rosado, Ricardo Santos
Scotland	Jonathan King, Andrew McArthur, George Murray, Eric Ramsay, Richie Ramsay, Lloyd Saltman
Slovenia	Gaber Burnik, Matjaz Gojcic, Grega Perne, Rok Pisek, Miha Studen, Jaka Vidmar
Spain	Pol Bech, Rafa Cabrera-Bello, Jorge Campillo, Alejandro Cañizares, Pablo Martín, Álvaro Velasco
Sweden	Jonas Blixt, Kalle Edberg, Oscar Florén, Andreas Högberg, Niklas Lemke, Alexander Norén
Switzerland	Roger Furrer, Martin Rominger, Nicolas Sulzer, Sandro Tan-Piaget, Damian Ulrich, Tino Weiss
Wales	Rhys Davies, Tim Dykes, Nigel Edwards, Zachariah Gould, Gareth Wright, James Williams

== Winners ==
Host nation and eight-time-winners team England won the opening 36-hole competition, with a 16-under-par score of 704, two strokes ahead of team Wales on 2nd place. Neither four-times-champions Ireland, with 16-year-old future professional major winner Rory McIlroy in the team, or two-times-champions Sweden did make it to the quarter-finals, finishing tenth and eleventh respectively.

There was no official award for the lowest individual score, but individual leader was Edoardo Molinari, Italy, with a 6-under-par score of 138, one stroke ahead of Nigel Edwards, Wales, Julien Guerrier, France, Gary Lockerbie, England and Mike Lorenzo-Vera, France.

Team England won the gold medal, earning their ninth title and first since 1991, beating team Germany in the final 6–1. The winning English team included 45-year-old Gary Wolstenholme and 16-year-old Oliver Fisher.

Team Switzerland, for the first time on the podium, earned the bronze on third place, after beating France 5–2 in the bronze match.

== Results ==
Qualification round

Team standings

Place	Country	Score	To par
1	England	362-342=704	−16
2	Wales	359-347=706	−14
3	Scotland	362-347=709	−11
4	France	359-353=712	−8
5	Spain	362-360=722	+2
6	Germany	381-353=734	+14
7	Switzerland	373-362=735	+15
8	Italy	375-361=736	+16
9	Denmark	377-363=740	+20
10	Ireland	378-364=742	+22
T11	Sweden *	380-364=744	+24
T11	Netherlands	388-356=744	+24
T13	Finland *	382-366=748	+28
T13	Austria	379-369=748	+28
T15	Iceland *	387-374=761	+41
T15	Norway	380-381=761	+41
17	Portugal	384-380=764	+44
18	Belgium	388-390=778	+58
19	Czech Republic	403-385=788	+68
20	Slovenia	414-377=791	+71

* Note: In the event of a tie the order was determined by the best total of the two non-counting scores of the two rounds.

Individual leaders

Place	Player	Country	Score	To par
1	Edoardo Molinari	Italy	69-69=138	−6
T2	Nigel Edwards	Wales	69-70=139	−5
T2	Julien Guerrier	France	73-66=139	−5
T2	Gary Lockerbie	England	70-69=139	−5
T2	Mike Lorenzo-Vera	France	69-70=139	−5
6	James Williams	Wales	70-70=140	−4
T7	Oliver Fisher	England	73-68=141	−3
T7	Richie Ramsay	Scotland	74-67=141	−3
T7	Gary Wolstenholme	England	72-69=141	−3
T7	Gareth Wright	Wales	73-69=141	−3

Note: There was no official award for the lowest individual score.

Flight A

Bracket

Quarter finals
Switzerland	4
Wales	3
Germany	4
Scotland	3
France	5.5
Spain	1.5
England	5
Italy	2

Semi finals
Germany	5.5
Switzerland	1.5
England	5.5
France	1.5

Final
England	6
Germany	1
Bronze match
Switzerland	5
France	2

Elimination matches
Scotland	3.5
Wales	1.5
Spain	4.5
Italy	0.5

Match for 5th place
Scotland	4.5
Spain	0.5
Match for 7th place
Wales	3
Italy	2

Final games

England	Germany
6	1
J. Moul / O. Fisher	S. Kirstein / C. Trunzer 2 & 1
G. Wolstenholme / M. Richardson 1 hole	M. Kaymer / B. Miarka
Gary Lockerbie 3 & 2	Martin Kaymer
Matthew Richardson 1 hole	Christopher Trunzer
Jamie Moul 4 & 3	Stefan Kirstein
Oliver Fisher 4 & 3	Benjamin Miarka
Steven Tiley 6 & 4	Florian Fritsch

Flight B

Bracket

Round 1
Ireland	3.5
Iceland	1.5
Austria	3.5
Sweden	1.5
Netherlands	2.5
Finland	2.5
Norway	3
Denmark	2

Round 2
Ireland	4.5
Austria	0.5
Netherlands	3.5
Norway	1.5

Match for 9th place
Ireland	4
Netherlands	1
Match for 11th place
Austria	3.5
Norway	1.5

Elimination matches
Sweden	3.5
Iceland	1.5
Denmark	3
Finland	2

Match for 13th place
Sweden	3.5
Denmark	1.5
Match for 15th place
Finland	4
Iceland	1

Flight C

First round

Portugal	Slovenia
4	1

Czech Republic	Belgium
3	2

Second round

Belgium	Slovenia
4	1

Portugal	Czech Republic
4	1

Third round

Czech Republic	Slovenia
4	1

Portugal	Belgium
3	2

Final standings

Place	Country
1st place, gold medalist(s)	England
2nd place, silver medalist(s)	Germany
3rd place, bronze medalist(s)	Switzerland
4	France
5	Scotland
6	Spain
7	Wales
8	Italy
9	Ireland
10	Netherlands
11	Austria
12	Norway
13	Sweden
14	Denmark
15	Finland
16	Iceland
17	Portugal
18	Czech Republic
19	Belgium
20	Slovenia

== See also ==
- European Golf Association – Organizer of European amateur golf championships
- Eisenhower Trophy – biennial world amateur team golf championship for men organized by the International Golf Federation.
- European Ladies' Team Championship – European amateur team golf championship for women organised by the European Golf Association.
