= Edoardo Molinari =

Italian professional golfer (born 1981)

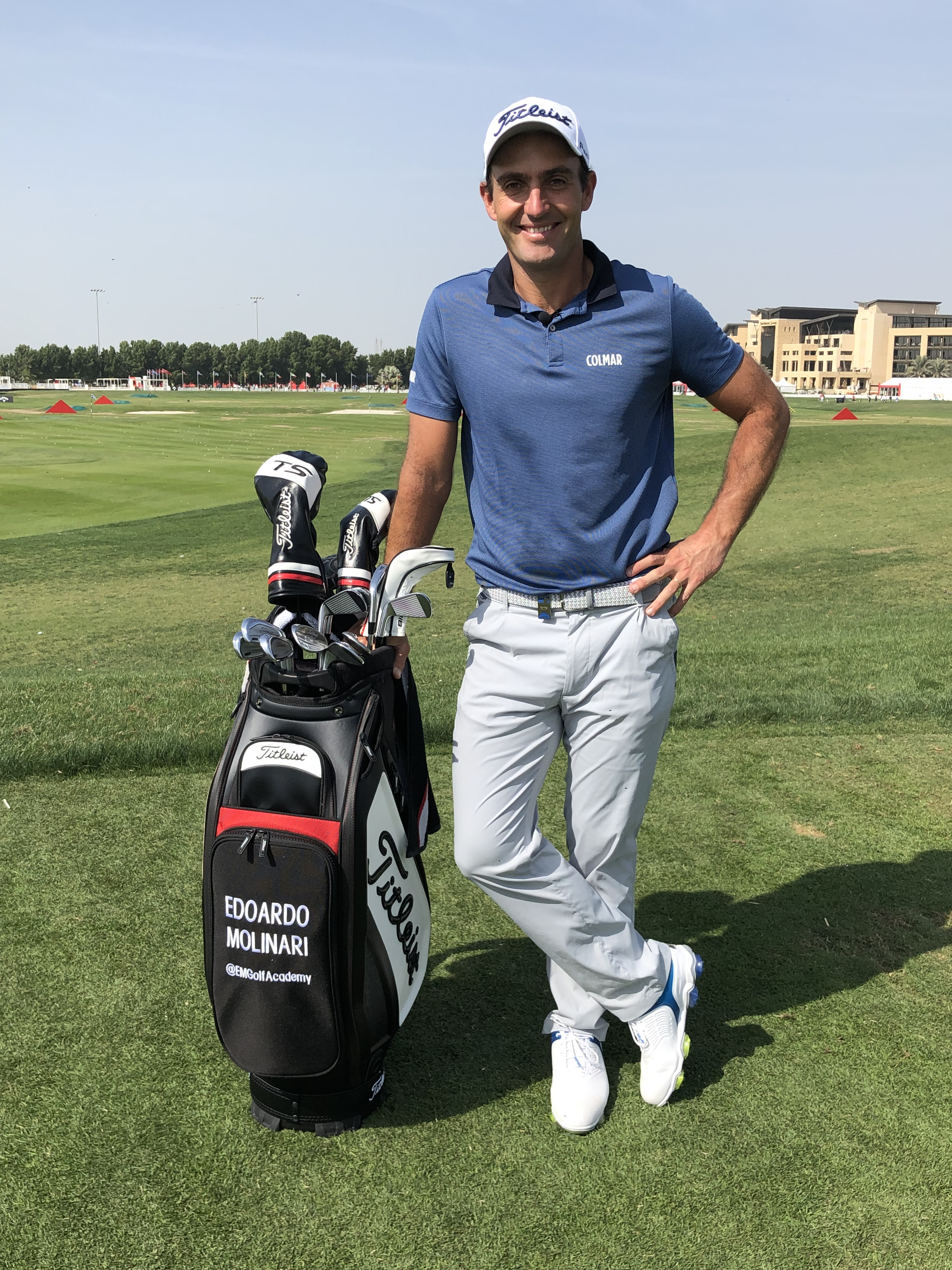

Personal information
- Full name: Edoardo Molinari
- Nickname: Dodo
- Nationality: Italy
- Born: 11 February 1981 (age 45) Turin, Italy
- Height: 1.80 m (5 ft 11 in)
- Weight: 165 lb (75 kg; 11.8 st)
- Spouse: Anna Roscio

Career
- Sport: Golf
- College: Polytechnic University of Turin
- Turned professional: 2006
- Current tour: European Tour
- Former tour: Challenge Tour
- Professional wins: 10
- Highest ranking: 14 (3 October 2010)

Number of wins by tour
- European Tour: 3
- Japan Golf Tour: 1
- Challenge Tour: 5 (Tied-8th all-time)
- Other: 1

Best results in major championships
- Masters Tournament: T11: 2011
- PGA Championship: T33: 2010
- U.S. Open: T35: 2021
- The Open Championship: T7: 2014

Achievements and awards
- Challenge Tour Rankings winner: 2009

Edoardo Molinari (born 11 February 1981) is an Italian professional golfer who plays on the European Tour, where he is a three-time winner. He was also the 2005 U.S. Amateur champion; 2009 Challenge Tour Rankings leader; winner, with his brother Francesco, of the 2009 World Cup; and a member of the 2010 European Ryder Cup winning team. He has won professional tournaments on four of the six continents on which golf is played: Europe, South America, Africa and Asia. He was a vice-captain for the 2023 Ryder Cup at Marco Simone, Italy.

== Early life ==
Molinari was born in Turin to Micaela, a now-retired architect, and Paolo Molinari, a dentist. He began to accompany his father to the golf course at age eight. Molinari speaks fluent English and Spanish in addition to Italian. Molinari is nicknamed "Dodo" because his younger brother, Francesco, could not pronounce "Edoardo" as a child.

== Amateur career ==
During a distinguished amateur career, Molinari won several national championships. The undisputed highlight of his amateur career came in 2005, when he became the first Italian and the first Continental European to win the U.S. Amateur. He claimed the title by holing a 25-foot birdie putt on the 33rd hole to win 4 & 3 over the American Dillon Dougherty. As a result of that victory, Molinari qualified to play in the 2006 U.S. Masters, U.S. Open and The Open Championship. His younger brother Francesco, who is also a professional golfer, caddied for him at that year's Masters. Molinari graduated from the Polytechnic University of Turin with a degree in engineering.

== Professional career ==
In 2006, Molinari turned professional. In 2007 he won the Club Colombia Masters and the Tusker Kenya Open on Europe's developmental Challenge Tour. The two victories and his consistent play led to a 16th-place finish on the season-long money list. That success enabled him to play on the top level European Tour during the 2008 season. Molinari's play was uneven during that season due to a wrist injury, and he was unable to retain his playing privileges in 2009.

Molinari returned to the Challenge Tour in 2009, where he was again successful, earning his third professional title at the Piemonte Open in May, in his home town of Turin. He also won the Kazakhstan Open in September and the Italian Federation Cup in October. He also came 2nd in the Club Colombia Masters, the Scottish Hydro Challenge, the Trophée du Golf de Genève and the ECCO Tour Championship. He topped the Challenge Tour money list in 2009 with record earnings of €242,979, almost €100,000 more than the previous high total.

On 22 November 2009, Molinari won the highly regarded Dunlop Phoenix Tournament in Miyazaki by defeating 2008 European Tour Order of Merit winner Robert Karlsson of Sweden by sinking a four-foot birdie putt on the second playoff hole after the two tied in regulation play. Molinari was the first Italian winner on the Japan Golf Tour.

On 29 November 2009, Molinari partnered with his younger brother Francesco to lead Italy to their first World Cup win at the Omega Mission Hills World Cup outside Shanghai, China. Edoardo leapt joyously around the 18th green after sinking the winning putt. This was the first win in the event by brothers and the first Italian victory in the event, generating significant coverage in the Molinari brothers' homeland. During 2009, Molinari's Official World Golf Ranking rose from 753 to 48.

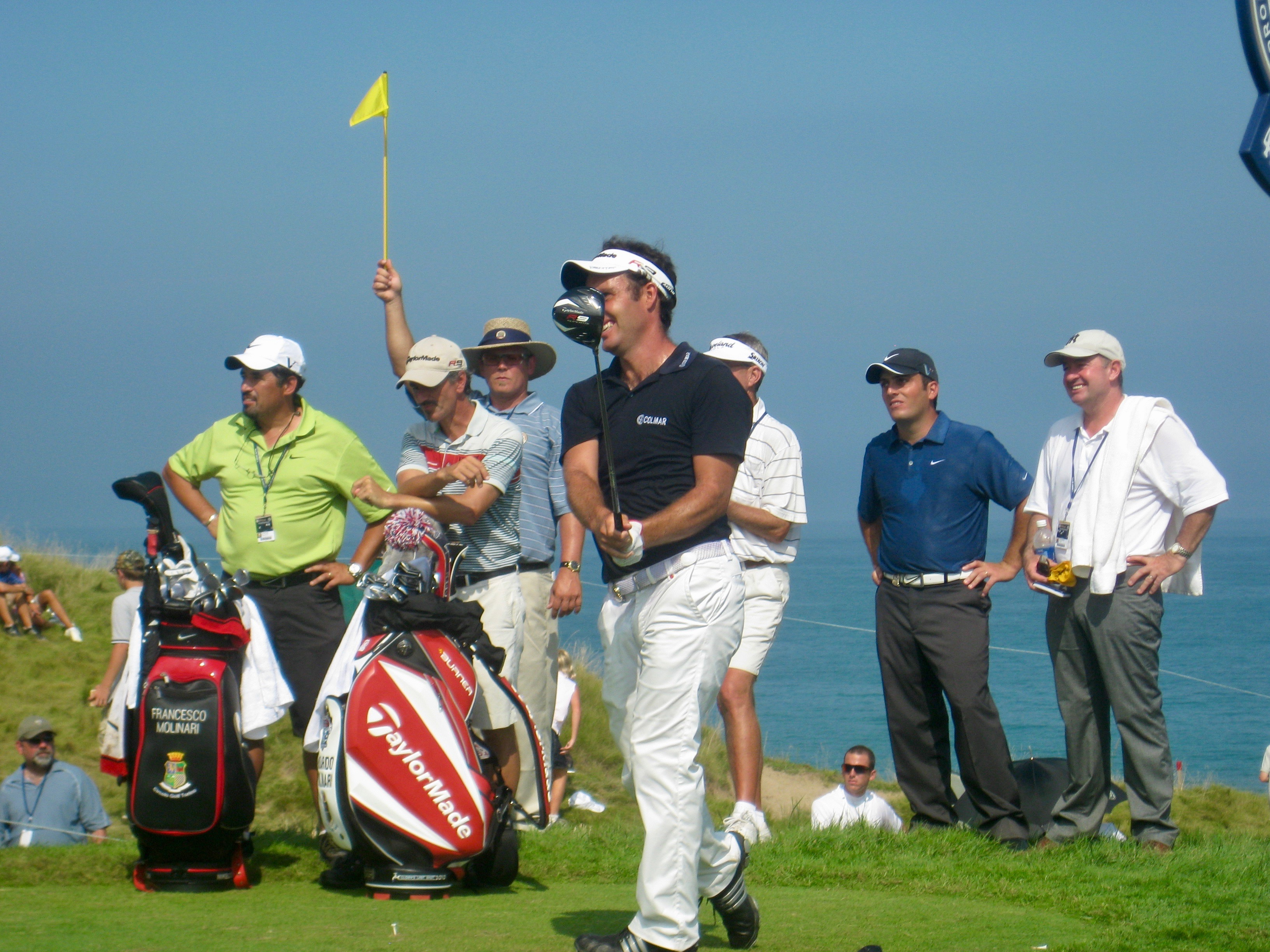
Molinari at the 2010 PGA Championship

On 29 March 2010, Molinari earned his best finish on the U.S. PGA Tour, finishing second by two shots to South African Ernie Els at the Arnold Palmer Invitational and earning his then largest check of $528,000US. Molinari holed a 50-foot putt on the 17th hole of the final round that was selected as "Shot of the Day" by NBC, the US network covering the tournament.

On 11 July 2010, Molinari won his first European Tour tournament, claiming the Barclays Scottish Open at Loch Lomond by three strokes over Darren Clarke. Francesco Molinari played alongside his brother and Clarke in the final threesome. Following Franceso's win in the 2006 Italian Open, Edoardo's victory in Scotland made the pair the third brothers to win on the European Tour after Seve and Manuel Ballesteros and Antonio and Germán Garrido.

On 29 August 2010, Molinari won his second European Tour title, the Johnnie Walker Championship at Gleneagles, by one stroke from Australian Brett Rumford, after birdieing the final three holes. Molinari's brother, Francesco, was once again paired with the eventual champion in the final round. Shortly afterwards, European Ryder Cup captain Colin Montgomerie named Molinari as one of his three "wild card" selections for the 2010 matches at Celtic Manor in Wales, along with Pádraig Harrington and Luke Donald. Molinari's brother Francesco also earned a place on the European team through the points list. The Molinaris were the first brothers to compete together in a Ryder Cup side since Bernard and Geoffrey Hunt played for the Great Britain and Ireland side in 1963.

Molinari's successful 2010 campaign saw him rise to a career-high of fourteenth in the Official World Golf Ranking. Molinari finished the 2010 season ranked 11th on the Race to Dubai, formerly known as the European Tour Order of Merit. He finished the year ranked 18th in the world. Molinari spent the first half of the year racking up middle of the pack finishes, with an 11th-place finish at Augusta as his lone highlight. He noted that "I know my progress this season has not been so good, but the time that I have spent on the PGA Tour in America has been a positive experience" in an essay he wrote as a special Open Championship correspondent for The Independent.

Molinari finished the 2011 season ranked 46th on the Race to Dubai with earnings of 686,391 Euros from 21 events. A quarter of his earnings came through his season best finish of fifth at the Barclays Singapore Open. Molinari fell out of the world ranking top 50 by the end of the season. An old injury to Molinari's left wrist led to tendonitis and ultimately required tendon surgery in June. His 2012 campaign was interrupted by a three-month layoff with Molinari returning to action at the BMW Italian Open in September. He achieved only one top-10 finish on the European Tour, sixth at the Trophée Hassan II, and qualified for only one major, the Masters Tournament. Molinari dropped to 86th on the 2012 Race to Dubai with earnings of 280,976 Euros from 17 events. He fell out of the top 200 of the Official World Golf Ranking, as well. Molinari set a goal of fully rehabilitating his left wrist for the 2013 season.

Molinari started the 2013 European Tour season with a series of missed cuts, but on 24 March, he obtained a strong second place at the Maybank Malaysian Open. The prize won (233,604 Euros) allowed him to enter the Race to Dubai, ranked 29th. Scoring a solid 68 (4 under par) in the final round, Molinari finished the Open de España tied for 27th position. At the 2013 BMW PGA Championship, won by his countrymate Matteo Manassero, Molinari finished T19 with two consecutive birdies on the 71st and 72nd holes. He had to withdraw from the BMW International Open and the Irish Open for persistent pain in his left thumb.

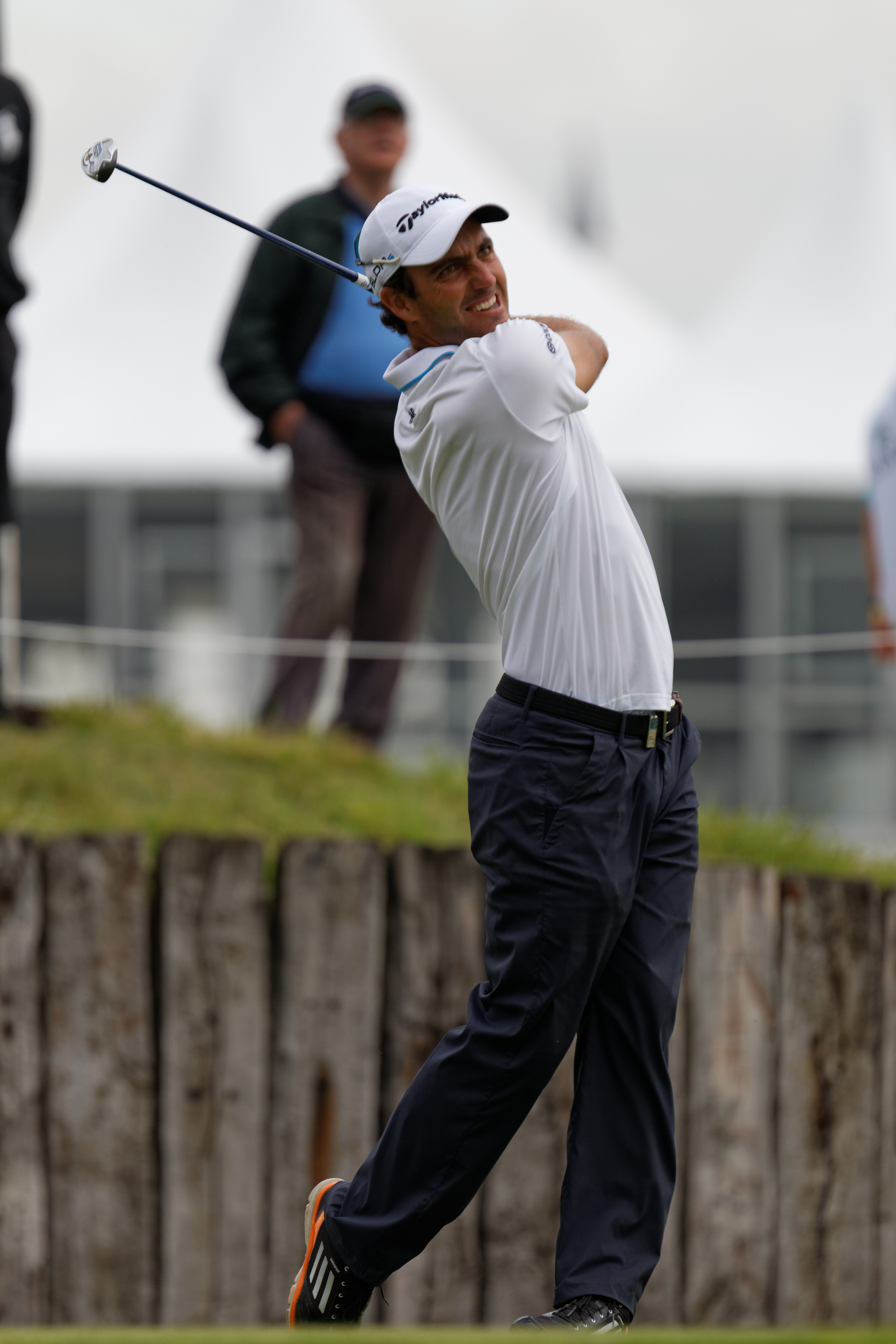
Molinari at the 2014 Alstom Open de France

In November 2013, after recovering from a new surgery, Molinari began his 2014 European Tour comeback campaign in South Africa, where he ended T52 at the South African Open Championship. He made his first cut since the BMW PGA Championship played in May 2013. At the Abu Dhabi HSBC Golf Championship on 19 January 2014, he finished T28 after four consecutive under-par rounds (70-71-71-71), which earned him a final score of −5. He earned his first top-10 finish of the season at the Omega Dubai Desert Classic (T9) and moved to 64th place in the Race to Dubai rankings. After that, he had a good period of form with three consecutive cuts made at the Joburg Open (T37) and Tshwane Open (T10) in South Africa and at the Trophée Hassan II (T25) in Morocco, respectively. During the following months, he played in a very consistent fashion, with multiple cuts made in a row, a period culminating in a second place at the Irish Open behind Mikko Ilonen of Finland and in his best finish so far (T7) at The Open Championship. Another solid display at the Wales Open, where he finished T4, gave him a total of 787.855 Euros. He ended the Race to Dubai in 40th place and won a total of €915,070, the second-best European Tour final position and prize of his career to date.

Molinari started reasonably well in his 2015 European Tour campaign with 6 cuts made out of 8 participations, with the highest position he occupied represented by his T15 finish at the Tshwane Open; however, a slump in form in the final part of the season, with eight consecutive missed cuts, cost him his European Tour card. In November 2015, he promptly regained his European Tour membership with a 24th-place finish at the 2015 European Tour Qualifying School. His 2016 European Tour campaign was not particularly brilliant (only 13 cuts made out of 27 participations), and at the end of the season, he found himself in 148th position (prize won 132,580 Euros) in the Race to Dubai rankings, losing his European Tour card again. For a second consecutive year, he was able to promptly regain his European Tour membership with a T2 place at the 2016 European Tour Qualifying School. Molinari is working with Irish caddie Colin Byrne, who has earned 20 wins with other golfers such as South African major champion Retief Goosen.

== Personal life ==
In spring 2012, he married his longtime girlfriend, Anna Roscio, at a church ceremony in Turin. Roscio caddied for Molinari at the 2010 Masters Par-3 Tournament. Denis Pugh, of London, serves as a swing coach to both Molinari brothers. He postponed retirement to work with the Molinari brothers, and he helped to rebuild Edoardo's swing, moving from hitting predominantly draws to fading the ball.

Molinari continues to live in Turin and to represent his home club, Circolo Golf Torino. His interests include the Juventus football (soccer) club and the Internet. He is considered one of the most emotional players on the European Tour and one of the most attractive players on the tour. He is also considered very popular with his fellow competitors on tour, many of whom advocated his selection to the 2010 European Ryder Cup team.

== Amateur wins ==
- 1996 English Boys Under 16 Championship (McGregor Trophy)
- 2001 Italian Amateur Championship
- 2002 Italian Amateur Foursomes Championship (with Francesco Molinari)
- 2003 Turkish Amateur Open Championship
- 2004 Italian Amateur Foursomes Championship (with Francesco Molinari)
- 2005 U.S. Amateur

== Professional wins (10) ==
=== European Tour wins (3) ===
No.	Date	Tournament	Winning score	Margin of victory	Runner-up
1	11 Jul 2010	Barclays Scottish Open	−12 (66-69-63-74=272)	3 strokes	(Northern Ireland) Darren Clarke
2	29 Aug 2010	Johnnie Walker Championship at Gleneagles	−10 (70-68-69-71=278)	1 stroke	(Australia) Brett Rumford
3	16 Apr 2017	Trophée Hassan II	−9 (71-74-70-68=283)	Playoff	(Republic of Ireland) Paul Dunne

European Tour playoff record (1–0)

No.	Year	Tournament	Opponent	Result
1	2017	Trophée Hassan II	(Republic of Ireland) Paul Dunne	Won with par on first extra hole

=== Japan Golf Tour wins (1) ===
No.	Date	Tournament	Winning score	Margin of victory	Runner-up
1	22 Nov 2009	Dunlop Phoenix Tournament	−13 (70-66-69-66=271)	Playoff	(Sweden) Robert Karlsson

Japan Golf Tour playoff record (1–0)

No.	Year	Tournament	Opponent	Result
1	2009	Dunlop Phoenix Tournament	(Sweden) Robert Karlsson	Won with birdie on second extra hole

=== Challenge Tour wins (5) ===
No.	Date	Tournament	Winning score	Margin of victory	Runner-up
1	4 Feb 2007	Club Colombia Masters^{1}	−5 (69-69-72-69=279)	Playoff	(Colombia) Gustavo Mendoza
2	11 Mar 2007	Tusker Kenya Open	−6 (68-69-67-70=274)	1 stroke	(South Africa) James Kamte
3	23 May 2009	Piemonte Open	−18 (67-67-66-70=270)	4 strokes	(England) Gary Boyd
4	20 Sep 2009	Kazakhstan Open	−20 (67-67-66-68=268)	3 strokes	(England) Chris Gane
5	24 Oct 2009	Italian Federation Cup	−21 (66-67-68-66=267)	1 stroke	(Belgium) Nicolas Colsaerts

^{1}Co-sanctioned by the Tour de las Américas

Challenge Tour playoff record (1–0)

No.	Year	Tournament	Opponent	Result
1	2007	Club Colombia Masters	(Colombia) Gustavo Mendoza	Won with birdie on second extra hole

=== Other wins (1) ===
No.	Date	Tournament	Winning score	Margin of victory	Runners-up
1	29 Nov 2009	Omega Mission Hills World Cup (with (Italy) Francesco Molinari)	−29 (64-66-61-68=259)	1 stroke	Ireland − Graeme McDowell and Rory McIlroy, Sweden − Robert Karlsson and Henrik Stenson

== Results in major championships ==
Tournament	2005	2006	2007	2008	2009
Masters Tournament		CUT			
U.S. Open		CUT			
The Open Championship	T60	T68			
PGA Championship					

Tournament	2010	2011	2012	2013	2014	2015	2016	2017	2018
Masters Tournament	CUT	T11	T57						
U.S. Open	T47	T54							
The Open Championship	T27	T66			T7	CUT			
PGA Championship	T33	T69			T46				

Tournament	2019	2020	2021	2022	2023	2024	2025
Masters Tournament							
PGA Championship							
U.S. Open			T35			CUT	CUT
The Open Championship		NT					

Top 10
Did not play

CUT = missed the half-way cut
"T" = tied
NT = no tournament due to COVID-19 pandemic

=== Summary ===
Tournament	Wins	2nd	3rd	Top-5	Top-10	Top-25	Events	Cuts made
Masters Tournament	0	0	0	0	0	1	4	2
U.S. Open	0	0	0	0	0	0	6	3
The Open Championship	0	0	0	0	1	1	6	5
PGA Championship	0	0	0	0	0	0	3	3
Totals	0	0	0	0	1	2	19	13

- Most consecutive cuts made – 10 (2010 U.S. Open – 2014 PGA)
- Longest streak of top-10s – 1 (2014 Open Championship)

== Results in The Players Championship ==
Tournament	2011
The Players Championship	CUT

CUT = missed the halfway cut

== Results in World Golf Championships ==
Tournament	2010	2011
Match Play	R64	R32
Championship	61	T39
Invitational	T55	T33
Champions	T41	

Did not play

QF, R16, R32, R64 = Round in which player lost in match play
"T" = Tied

== Team appearances ==
Amateur

- European Boys' Team Championship (representing Italy): 1998, 1999
- Eisenhower Trophy (representing Italy): 1998, 2000, 2002, 2004
- Jacques Léglise Trophy (representing the Continent of Europe): 1998
- European Youths' Team Championship (representing Italy): 2000
- European Amateur Team Championship (representing Italy): 2001, 2003, 2005
- Bonallack Trophy (representing Europe): 2002, 2004
- St Andrews Trophy (representing the Continent of Europe): 2004

Professional

- World Cup (representing Italy): 2007, 2008, 2009 (winners), 2011
- Ryder Cup (representing Europe): 2010 (winners)
- Royal Trophy (representing Europe): 2012

Ryder Cup points record

2010	Total
1	1

== See also ==
- 2007 Challenge Tour graduates
- 2009 Challenge Tour graduates
- 2015 European Tour Qualifying School graduates
- 2016 European Tour Qualifying School graduates
- 2024 European Tour Qualifying School graduates
- 2026 European Tour Qualifying School graduates
- List of golfers with most Challenge Tour wins
- List of golfers to achieve a three-win promotion from the Challenge Tour
