= 2008 Challenge Tour =

Golf tour season

2008 Challenge Tour season
- Duration: 29 November 2007 – 26 October 2008
- Number of official events: 33
- Most wins: (Netherlands) Taco Remkes (3)
- Rankings: (England) David Horsey

The 2008 Challenge Tour was the 20th season of the Challenge Tour, the official development tour to the European Tour.

== Schedule ==
The following table lists official events during the 2008 season.

Date	Tournament	Host country	Purse (€)	Winner (Note: The number in brackets after each winner's name is the number of Challenge Tour events they had won up to and including that tournament. This information is only shown for Challenge Tour members. It is rare for someone to accumulate many wins on the Challenge Tour as success at this level usually leads to promotion to the European Tour.)	OWGR points	Other tours (Note: EUR − European Tour; NGL − Nordic Golf League; TLA − Tour de las Américas; TPG − TPG Tour.)	Notes
2 Dec	Abierto del Litoral Personal	Argentina	US$170,000	(Argentina) Miguel Rodríguez (2)	12	TLA, TPG	New to Challenge Tour
9 Dec	Abierto Visa de la República	Argentina	US$200,000	(Paraguay) Marco Ruiz (1)	12	TLA, TPG	
9 Mar	Tusker Kenya Open	Kenya	180,000	(England) Iain Pyman (8)	12		
30 Mar	Abierto Visa del Centro	Argentina	US$200,000	(Argentina) Estanislao Goya (1)	12	TLA, TPG	New to Challenge Tour
6 Apr	Abierto Visa de la República	Argentina	US$200,000	(Finland) Antti Ahokas (1)	12	TLA, TPG	
13 Apr	Club Colombia Masters	Colombia	US$180,000	(Netherlands) Wil Besseling (1)	12	TLA	
26 Apr	AGF-Allianz Open Côtes d'Armor Bretagne	France	140,000	(Sweden) Joakim Haeggman (3)	12		
4 May	Banque Populaire Moroccan Classic	Morocco	150,000	(Northern Ireland) Michael Hoey (3)	12		
17 May	Piemonte Open	Italy	150,000	(England) Seve Benson (1)	12		New tournament
25 May	DHL Wrocław Open	Poland	150,000	(England) Gary Clark (1)	12		New tournament
1 Jun	Oceânico Group Pro-Am Challenge	England	150,000	(Italy) Alessandro Tadini (2)	12		
8 Jun	Reale Challenge de España	Spain	140,000	(Scotland) Andrew McArthur (1)	12		
15 Jun	SK Golf Challenge	Finland	150,000	(England) Simon Robinson (1)	12		New tournament
15 Jun	Saint-Omer Open	France	600,000	(England) David Dixon (1)	18	EUR	
22 Jun	Telenet Trophy	Belgium	140,000	(England) David Horsey (1)	12		
29 Jun	Scottish Challenge	Scotland	220,000	(Netherlands) Taco Remkes (1)	12		
6 Jul	AGF-Allianz EurOpen de Lyon	France	200,000	(England) David Horsey (2)	12		New tournament
13 Jul	Credit Suisse Challenge	Switzerland	140,000	(Spain) Rafa Cabrera-Bello (2)	12		
20 Jul	MAN NÖ Open	Austria	140,000	(Switzerland) André Bossert (3)	12		
27 Jul	SWALEC Wales Challenge	Wales	140,000	(Republic of Ireland) Michael McGeady (1)	12		
3 Aug	Challenge of Ireland	Ireland	150,000	(Australia) Andrew Tampion (1)	12		
10 Aug	Lexus Open	Norway	150,000	(Denmark) Jeppe Huldahl (1)	12		
17 Aug	Trophée du Golf Club de Genève	Switzerland	210,000	(Sweden) Klas Eriksson (5)	12		
17 Aug	Vodafone Challenge	Germany	140,000	(Scotland) Richie Ramsay (1)	12		
24 Aug	Ypsilon Golf Challenge	Czech Republic	180,000	(England) Seve Benson (2)	12		New tournament
31 Aug	ECCO Tour Championship	Denmark	180,000	(Finland) Antti Ahokas (2)	12	NGL	
7 Sep	Dubliner Challenge	Sweden	140,000	(Denmark) Mark Haastrup (1)	12		New tournament
14 Sep	Qingdao Golf Open	China	US$500,000	(Northern Ireland) Gareth Maybin (1)	12		New tournament
21 Sep	Kazakhstan Open	Kazakhstan	430,000	(England) Gary Lockerbie (1)	12		
28 Sep	Dutch Futures	Netherlands	140,000	(Netherlands) Taco Remkes (2)	12		
5 Oct	AGF-Allianz Golf Open Grand Toulouse	France	140,000	(Scotland) Richie Ramsay (2)	12		
18 Oct	Margara Diehl-Ako Platinum Open	Italy	160,000	(Netherlands) Taco Remkes (3) (Note: Remkes earned immediate promotion to the European Tour, as this was his third win of the season.)	12		
26 Oct	Apulia San Domenico Grand Final	Italy	280,000	(Argentina) Estanislao Goya (2)	12		Tour Championship

== Rankings ==
The rankings were based on prize money won during the season, calculated in Euros. The top 20 players on the rankings earned status to play on the 2009 European Tour.

Rank	Player	Prize money (€)
1	(England) David Horsey	144,118
2	(England) Gary Lockerbie	138,509
3	(Netherlands) Taco Remkes	137,331
4	(Northern Ireland) Gareth Maybin	117,719
5	(Argentina) Estanislao Goya	113,336
