= Geoff Drakeford =

Australian professional golfer

Geoff Drakeford (born 21 December 1991) is an Australian professional golfer from Yarram, Australia.

Drakeford turned professional in 2014 and has mostly played on the PGA Tour of Australasia. He had some success in 2015, finishing runner-up in the New Zealand PGA Championship, the Challenge de España and the New South Wales PGA Championship during the year.

== Team appearances ==
Amateur

- Nomura Cup (representing Australia): 2013 (winners)
- Eisenhower Trophy (representing Australia): 2014
- Bonallack Trophy (representing Asia/Pacific): 2014
- Australian Men's Interstate Teams Matches (representing Victoria): 2011, 2012, 2013, 2014 (winners)
