= Andrew Butterfield =

English professional golfer

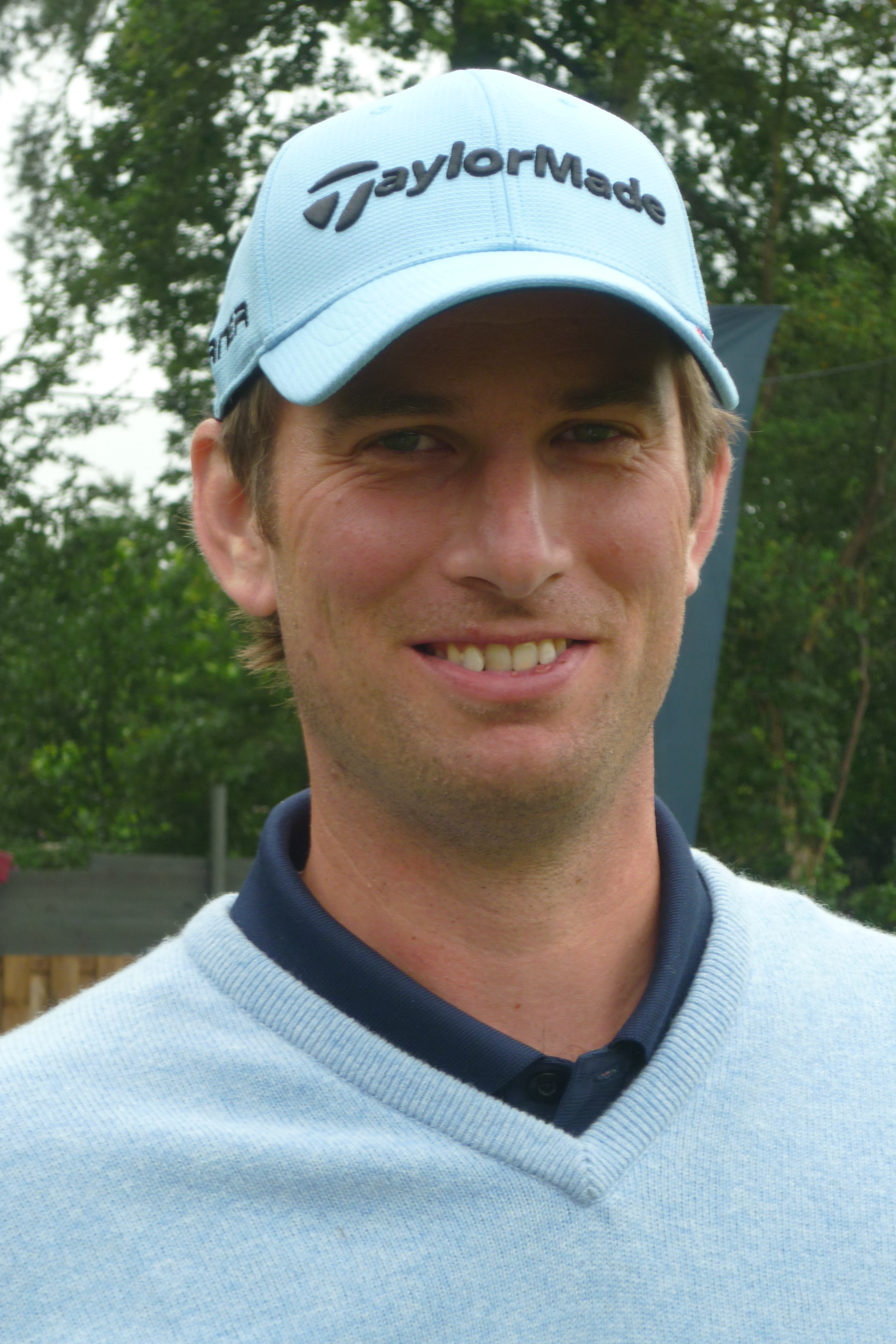

Personal information
- Nationality: England
- Born: 1 July 1972 (age 54) London, England
- Height: 6 ft 3 in (1.91 m)
- Weight: 187 lb (85 kg; 13.4 st)

Career
- Sport: Golf
- Turned professional: 1993
- Former tours: European Tour; Challenge Tour
- Professional wins: 3

Number of wins by tour
- Challenge Tour: 1
- Other: 1

Best results in major championships
- Masters Tournament: DNP
- PGA Championship: DNP
- U.S. Open: DNP
- The Open Championship: CUT: 2005

Andrew Butterfield (born 1 July 1972) is an English professional golfer. He played on the European Tour and its development tour, the Challenge Tour, between 1996 and 2012. He won one tournament on the Challenge Tour, in June 2009 at The Princess in Sweden.

== Career ==
Butterfield was born in London, England. He turned professional in 1993. In 1995, he won the Kent Open and gained a place on the Challenge Tour for the following season. He played on the Challenge Tour until qualifying for the European Tour through Q-School in 1999. Butterfield did not perform well enough on tour in 2000 to retain his card and had to go back to the Challenge Tour in 2001. He got his European Tour card back through Q-School again in 2001 and played on the European Tour in 2002 but did not find any success on tour. He returned to the Challenge Tour and played there until 2005 when he finished 4th on the Challenge Tour's Order of Merit which earned him his European Tour card for 2006. He did not play well enough in 2006 to retain his tour card but was able to get temporary status on tour for 2007 by finishing 129th on the Order of Merit. He played on the European Tour and the Challenge Tour in 2007 and has played only on the Challenge Tour since 2008. He picked up his first win on the Challenge Tour in Sweden at The Princess in June 2009. He also won an event on the PGA EuroPro Tour in 2004.

== Professional wins (3) ==
=== Challenge Tour wins (1) ===
No.	Date	Tournament	Winning score	Margin of victory	Runners-up
1	28 Jun 2009	The Princess	−13 (62-69-67-73=271)	1 stroke	(England) Richard McEvoy, (Spain) Carlos Rodiles

Challenge Tour playoff record (0–1)

No.	Year	Tournament	Opponent	Result
1	2005	Cadillac Russian Open	(Sweden) Mikael Lundberg	Lost to birdie on fourth extra hole

=== PGA EuroPro Tour wins (1) ===
No.	Date	Tournament	Winning score	Margin of victory	Runner-up
1	6 Aug 2004	Matchroom Golf Management Classic	−18 (65-67-66=198)	2 strokes	(England) Michael Welch

=== Other wins (1) ===
- 1995 Kent Open

== Playoff record ==
European Tour playoff record (0–1)

No.	Year	Tournament	Opponent	Result
1	2005	Cadillac Russian Open	(Sweden) Mikael Lundberg	Lost to birdie on fourth extra hole

== Results in major championships ==
Tournament	2005
The Open Championship	CUT

Note: Butterfield only played in The Open Championship.
CUT = missed the half-way cut

== See also ==
- 2005 Challenge Tour graduates
- 2009 Challenge Tour graduates
