= Wil Besseling =

Dutch professional golfer

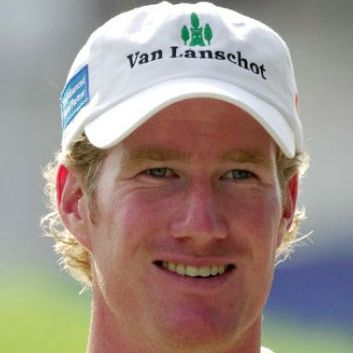

Personal information
- Full name: Wil Besseling
- Nationality: Netherlands
- Born: 9 December 1985 (age 40) Hoorn, Netherlands
- Height: 1.85 m (6 ft 1 in)
- Weight: 80 kg (176 lb; 12 st 8 lb)
- Children: 1

Career
- Sport: Golf
- Turned professional: 2006
- Current tour: European Tour
- Former tours: Challenge Tour; EPD Tour
- Professional wins: 4

Number of wins by tour
- Challenge Tour: 1
- Other: 3

Best results in major championships
- Masters Tournament: DNP
- PGA Championship: DNP
- U.S. Open: T56: 2022
- The Open Championship: DNP

Wil Besseling (born 9 December 1985) is a Dutch professional golfer.

== Early life and amateur career ==
Besseling was born in Utrecht. He won the Dutch Amateur Match Play Championship in 2001, just two years after taking up the sport. The highlight of his amateur career came in 2006, when he won the Eisenhower Trophy in partnership with Joost Luiten and Tim Sluiter, and also finished with the lowest individual score.

== Professional career ==
In 2006, Besseling turned pro. He played on the EPD Tour, one of the developmental golf tours based in Europe, during 2007. He finished 5th on the 2007 Order of Merit, having been in the top 20 in all but two events, with seven top tens and one victory.

At the end of the year, Besseling attempted to gain his card on the European Tour via the qualifying school. He was unsuccessful, and had to settle playing on the second tier Challenge Tour in 2008. He won his first title on that tour at the second tournament of the season, the Club Colombia Masters, when he was a runaway winner, finishing seven strokes clear of the field. He also collected three runners-up prizes during the year, and ended the season in 15th place on the money list to graduate directly to the European Tour for 2009.

== Amateur wins ==
- 2001 Dutch Amateur Match Play Championship

== Professional wins (4) ==
=== Challenge Tour wins (1) ===
No.	Date	Tournament	Winning score	Margin of victory	Runners-up
1	13 Apr 2008	Club Colombia Masters^{1}	−16 (67-66-69-66=268)	7 strokes	(Finland) Antti Ahokas, (Denmark) Mark Haastrup

^{1}Co-sanctioned by the Tour de las Américas

Challenge Tour playoff record (0–2)

No.	Year	Tournament	Opponent(s)	Result
1	2008	Trophée du Golf Club de Genève	(Sweden) Klas Eriksson, (Brazil) Alexandre Rocha	Eriksson won with birdie on fourth extra hole Rocha eliminated by par on third hole
2	2013	Telenet Trophy	(Australia) Daniel Gaunt	Lost to birdie on first extra hole

=== EPD Tour wins (1) ===
No.	Date	Tournament	Winning ccore	Margin of victory	Runners-up
1	23 Feb 2007	Real de Faula Classic	−7 (70-67-72=209)	Playoff	(Spain) Iñaki Alustiza-Martinez, (Germany) Nicolas Meitinger

=== Hi5 Pro Tour wins (1) ===
- 2008 Hi5 Pro Tour Al Torreal

=== Other wins (1) ===
No.	Date	Tournament	Winning score	Margin of victory	Runner-up
1	19 Mar 2017	KCB Karen Masters	−12 (66-66=132)	2 strokes	(Netherlands) Reinier Saxton

== Results in major championships ==
Tournament	2022
Masters Tournament	
PGA Championship	
U.S. Open	T56
The Open Championship	

Did not play

"T" = tied

== Team appearances ==
Amateur

- European Boys' Team Championship (representing the Netherlands): 2002, 2003
- European Amateur Team Championship (representing the Netherlands): 2003, 2005
- European Youths' Team Championship (representing the Netherlands): 2004, 2006
- Eisenhower Trophy (representing the Netherlands): 2004, 2006 (team winners and individual leader)
- St Andrews Trophy (representing the Continent of Europe): 2006

== See also ==
- 2008 Challenge Tour graduates
- 2011 European Tour Qualifying School graduates
- 2024 European Tour Qualifying School graduates
