= Hassan II Golf Trophy =

Golf tournament in Morocco

Coordinates: 33.917°N 6.831°W

Trophy Hassan II

Tournament information
- Location: Rabat, Morocco
- Established: 1971
- Courses: Royal Golf Dar Es Salam (Red Course)
- Par: 73
- Length: 7,615 yards (6,963 m)
- Tours: European Tour; PGA Tour Champions
- Format: Stroke play
- Prize fund: US$2,500,000
- Month played: May

Tournament record score
- Aggregate: 266 Rhys Davies (2010)
- To par: −25 as above

Current champion
- (Australia) Scott Hend

Location map
- Location in Morocco

The Hassan II Golf Trophy is a golf tournament in Morocco hosted by Prince Moulay Rachid. The tournament was founded by, and is now named for, his father, Hassan II, who served as King of Morocco. The tournament is currently played on PGA Tour Champions, but was originally staged as an invitational pro-am and attended by only a handful of top professionals. It later moved onto the European Tour schedule in 2010 and was played on that tour until 2019. The winner receives a gold dagger inlaid with jewels.

It has been held at the Robert Trent Jones designed Royal Golf Dar Es Salam in Rabat every year except for 2011 through 2015, when it moved to Golf du Palais Royal in Agadir. The tournament has been played since 1971, but did not take place from 1986 to 1990, 2004, and 2009.

In November 2021, it was announced that the 2022 event would feature on the PGA Tour Champions schedule.

== Winners ==
Year	Tour (Note: CHMP − PGA Tour Champions; EUR − European Tour.)	Winner	Score	To par	Margin of victory	Runner(s)-up	Ref.
Trophy Hassan II
2026	CHMP	(Australia) Scott Hend	204	−15	5 strokes	(New Zealand) Steven Alker (United States) Tommy Gainey	
2025	CHMP	(Spain) Miguel Ángel Jiménez	208	−11	2 strokes	(New Zealand) Steven Alker	
2024	CHMP	(Argentina) Ricardo González	209	−10	1 stroke	(Denmark) Thomas Bjørn	
2023	CHMP	(Canada) Stephen Ames	210	−9	5 strokes	(Australia) Mark Hensby	
2022	CHMP	Removed from the schedule					
Trophée Hassan II
2021	EUR	Cancelled due to the COVID-19 pandemic					
2020	EUR	No tournament due to the COVID-19 pandemic					
2019	EUR	(Spain) Jorge Campillo	283	−9	2 strokes	(United States) Sean Crocker (United States) Julian Suri (South Africa) Erik van Rooyen	
2018	EUR	(France) Alexander Lévy	280	−8	1 stroke	(Spain) Álvaro Quirós	
2017	EUR	(Italy) Edoardo Molinari	283	−9	Playoff (Note: Molinari won with a par on the first hole of a sudden-death playoff.)	(Republic of Ireland) Paul Dunne	
2016	EUR	(South Korea) Wang Jeung-hun	283	−5	Playoff (Note: Wang won with a birdie on the second hole of a sudden-death playoff.)	(Spain) Nacho Elvira	
2015	EUR	(Scotland) Richie Ramsay	278	−10	1 stroke	(France) Romain Wattel	
2014	EUR	(Spain) Alejandro Cañizares	269	−19	5 strokes	(England) Andy Sullivan	
2013	EUR	(Germany) Marcel Siem	271	−17	3 strokes	(England) David Horsey (Finland) Mikko Ilonen	
2012	EUR	(Northern Ireland) Michael Hoey	271	−17	3 strokes	(Republic of Ireland) Damien McGrane	
2011	EUR	(England) David Horsey	274 (Note: Players alternated playing at Golf du Palais Royal and Golf de l'Océan for the first two rounds, with the final two rounds played at Golf du Palais Royal.)	−13	Playoff (Note: Horsey won with a birdie on the second hole of a sudden-death playoff.)	(Wales) Rhys Davies (South Africa) Jaco van Zyl	
2010	EUR	(Wales) Rhys Davies	266 (Note: Players alternated playing the Red and Blue courses for the first two rounds, with the final two rounds played on the Red course.)	−25	2 strokes	(South Africa) Louis Oosthuizen	
2009: No tournament
Hassan II Golf Trophy
2008		(South Africa) Ernie Els	275	−17	2 strokes	(England) Simon Dyson	
2007		(Republic of Ireland) Pádraig Harrington	280	−12	3 strokes	(Northern Ireland) Darren Clarke	
2006		(Scotland) Sam Torrance	281	−11	Playoff (Note: Torrance won with a birdie on the first hole of a sudden-death playoff.)	(France) Raphaël Jacquelin	
2005		(United States) Erik Compton	277	−15	5 strokes	(Portugal) José-Filipe Lima	
2004: No tournament
2003		(Spain) Santiago Luna (3)	277	−15	4 strokes	(Sweden) Joakim Haeggman	
2002		(Spain) Santiago Luna (2)	278	−14	4 strokes	(France) Olivier Edmond (United States) Steve Lowery	
2001		(Sweden) Joakim Haeggman	284	−8	1 stroke	(Spain) Santiago Luna (England) Mark Roe	
2000		(England) Roger Chapman	277	−15	1 stroke	(United States) Shaun Micheel	
1999		(United States) David Toms	275	−17	Playoff (Note: Toms won after a sudden-death playoff.)	(Spain) Miguel Ángel Martín (United States) Chris Perry	
1998		(Spain) Santiago Luna	277	−15	Playoff (Note: Luna won after a sudden-death playoff.)	(United States) Tom Pernice Jr.	
1997		(Scotland) Colin Montgomerie	277	−15	3 strokes	(United States) Donnie Hammond (England) David Howell (Sweden) Henrik Nyström	
1996		(Spain) Ignacio Garrido	279	−13	2 strokes	(Zimbabwe) Nick Price	
1995		(Zimbabwe) Nick Price	286	−6	2 strokes	(England) Roger Chapman	
1994		(England) Martin Gates	279	−13	3 strokes	(United States) Scott Hoch (Sweden) Robert Karlsson	
1993		(United States) Payne Stewart (2)	277	−15	8 strokes	(United States) Brian Claar (United States) Dillard Pruitt (South Africa) Wayne Westner	
1992		(United States) Payne Stewart	281	−11	Playoff (Note: Stewart won the title in a sudden-death playoff.)	(United States) D. A. Weibring	
1991		(Fiji) Vijay Singh	285	−7	Playoff (Note: Singh won the title in a sudden-death playoff.)	(United States) Payne Stewart	
1986–1990: No tournament
1985		(United States) Ken Green	285	−7	1 stroke	(United States) Andrew Magee	
1984		(United States) Roger Maltbie	289	−3	Playoff (Note: Maltbie won on the second hole of a sudden-death playoff.)	(United States) Bruce Fleisher (Canada) Richard Zokol	
1983		(United States) Ron Streck				(United States) Bob Eastwood	
1982		(United States) Frank Conner	287	−5	1 stroke	(United States) Lennie Clements (United States) Butch Baird	
1981		(United States) Bob Eastwood	287	−5	2 strokes	(United States) Bob Byman	
1980		(United States) Ed Sneed	285	−7	3 strokes	(United States) Lee Trevino	
1979		(United States) Mike Brannan	288	−4	2 strokes	(United States) Ed Fiori (United States) Alan Tapie	
1978		(England) Peter Townsend	292	−1	1 stroke	(United States) John Schroeder	
1977		(United States) Lee Trevino	283	−9	4 strokes	(United States) Billy Casper	
1976		(Spain) Salvador Balbuena	289	−3	3 strokes	(United States) George Burns (United States) Danny Edwards (United States) Curtis Strange	
1975		(United States) Billy Casper (2)	284	−8	11 strokes	(United States) Tommy Aaron (United States) Ron Cerrudo	
1974		(United States) Larry Ziegler	284	−8	1 stroke	(Taiwan) Lu Liang-Huan	
1973		(United States) Billy Casper	288	−4	5 strokes	(United States) Rod Funseth	
1972		(United States) Ron Cerrudo	289	−3	Playoff (Note: Cerrudo won on the first hole of a sudden-death playoff.)	(United States) Al Geiberger	
Moroccan Grand Prix
1971		(United States) Orville Moody	291	−1	2 strokes	(United States) Jerry Heard	

== See also ==
- Lalla Meryem Cup
