= Oliver Fisher =

English professional golfer (born 1988)

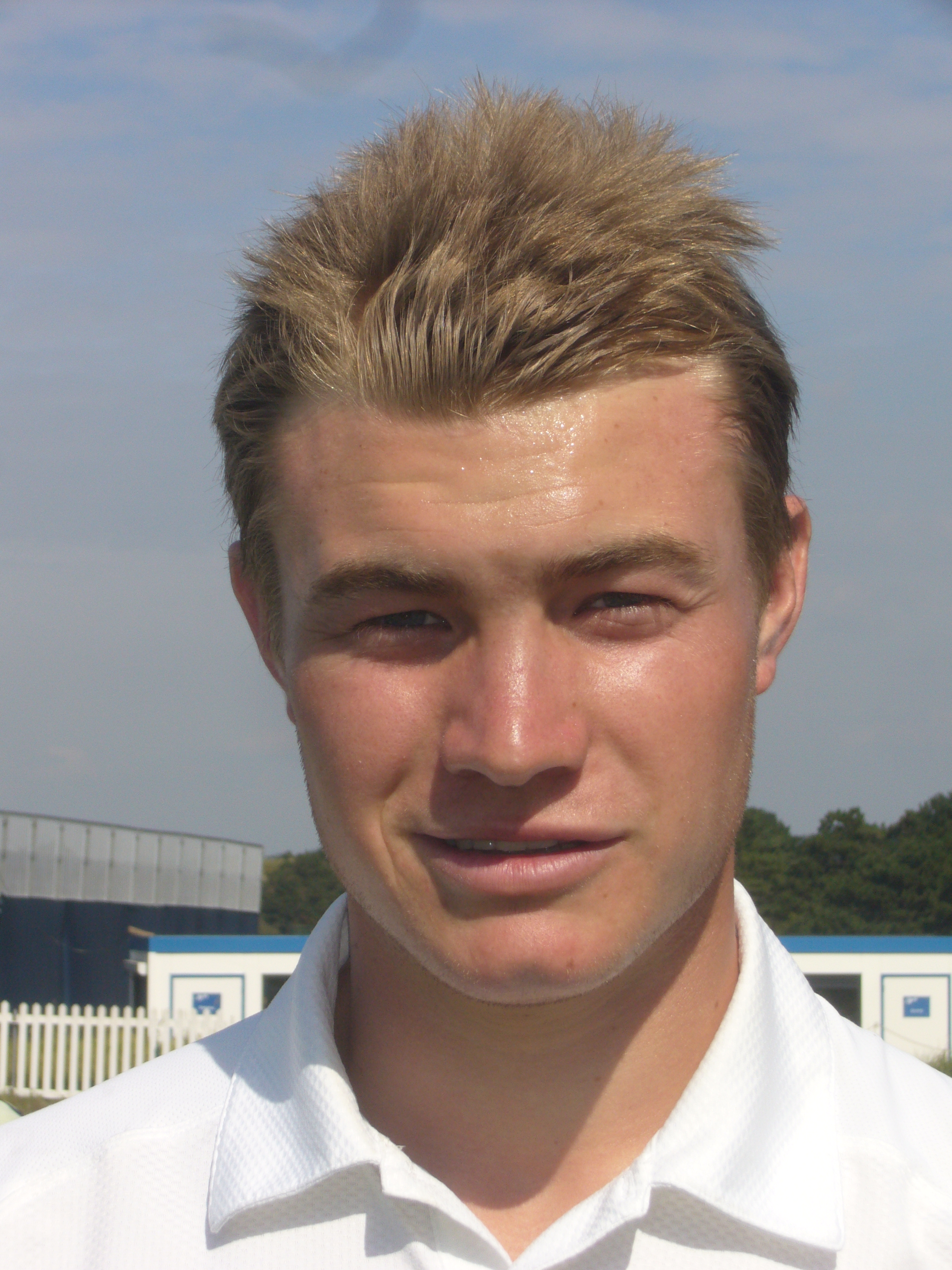

Personal information
- Full name: Oliver James Fisher
- Nationality: England
- Born: 13 September 1988 (age 38) Chingford, London, England
- Height: 6 ft 1 in (1.85 m)
- Weight: 178 lb (81 kg; 12.7 st)

Career
- Sport: Golf
- Turned professional: 2006
- Current tour: European Tour
- Former tour: LIV Golf
- Professional wins: 1

Number of wins by tour
- European Tour: 1

Best results in major championships
- Masters Tournament: DNP
- PGA Championship: DNP
- U.S. Open: CUT: 2014
- The Open Championship: T32: 2013

Oliver James Fisher (born 13 September 1988) is an English professional golfer who plays on the European Tour. He also played in the inaugural LIV Golf Invitational Series. In 2018, Fisher shot the first round of 59 on the European Tour.

== Early life and amateur career ==
In 1988, Fisher was born in Chingford, London. He was a winner of the Faldo Series, Nick Faldo's development programme for young golfers, in 2003, 2004 and 2005, and as such was regarded as one of the best prospects of his generation. In 2004, he was part of the English team winning the European Boys' Team Championship and a member of Europe's winning 2004 Junior Ryder Cup team against United States in Ohio. In 2005 he became the youngest player to take part in the Walker Cup.

In late 2006, while still an amateur, Fisher entered the European Tour's qualifying school. He finished fifth to become the youngest Briton to win a tour card and immediately turned professional.

== Professional career ==
He made the cut at his first five European Tour events and ended the season just outside the top 100 on the 2007 Order of Merit to retain his card for 2008. A solid 2008 season which included a runner-up finish at the MAPFRE Open de Andalucía by Valle Romano, where he lost out in a playoff with Thomas Levet, saw him finish in 51st place on the Order of Merit.

Fisher was coached from 9 years old until January 2009 by Chris Jenkins.

The 2009 season proved a struggle for Fisher as he finished 125th on the Race To Dubai standings and therefore lost his European Tour Card, and failed to gain it back at qualifying school. Nevertheless, Fisher received a number of starts and sponsors invites in 2010, and a run of 4 consecutive top ten finishes in the early part of the season gave Fisher the momentum to successfully re-establish himself and regain full playing rights for the 2011 season.

Fisher endured an horrific start to the 2011 season missing 20 of his first 21 cuts before back-to-back made cuts in Sweden at the Nordea Masters and the Irish Open. In his very next tournament on the European Tour, Fisher won his maiden tour title at the Czech Open in August. He entered the final round tied for the lead and shot a closing 69 to win by two strokes from Mikael Lundberg. Fisher had started the tournament way down at 224th on the Race to Dubai and was in danger of losing his card, but the victory earned him a two-year tour exemption.

At the end of 2012, Fisher entered the PGA Tour Qualifying School and reached the final stage. However, he missed qualifying by just one stroke over six rounds. This was the last time that the Qualifying School provided a chance for players to qualify for the main PGA Tour, rather than the Web.com Tour. He remained on the European Tour for 2013.

In 2018, Fisher shot the first round of 59 on the European Tour in the second round of the Portugal Masters.

Hole	1	2	3	4	5	6	7	8	9	Out	10	11	12	13	14	15	16	17	18	In	Total
Par	4	4	4	4	5	3	4	3	4	35	4	4	5	3	4	4	3	5	4	36	71
Score	3	3	3	4	3	2	4	2	4	28	3	3	4	3	4	3	3	4	4	31	59

== Amateur wins ==
- 2004 McGregor Trophy, Lagonda Trophy
- 2006 St Andrews Links Trophy

== Professional wins (1) ==
=== European Tour wins (1) ===
No.	Date	Tournament	Winning score	Margin of victory	Runner-up
1	21 Aug 2011	Czech Open	−13 (71-67-68-69=275)	2 strokes	(Sweden) Mikael Lundberg

European Tour playoff record (0–2)

No.	Year	Tournament	Opponent	Result
1	2008	MAPFRE Open de Andalucía	(France) Thomas Levet	Lost to par on first extra hole
2	2014	Africa Open	(South Africa) Thomas Aiken	Lost to birdie on first extra hole

== Results in major championships ==
Tournament	2009	2010	2011	2012	2013	2014
Masters Tournament						
U.S. Open						CUT
The Open Championship	CUT				T32	CUT
PGA Championship						

Did not play

CUT = missed the half-way cut
"T" = tied

== Team appearances ==
Amateur

- European Boys' Team Championship (representing England): 2004 (winners)
- Junior Ryder Cup (representing Europe): 2004 (winners)
- European Amateur Team Championship (representing England): 2005 (winners)
- Walker Cup (representing Great Britain & Ireland): 2005
- European Youths' Team Championship (representing England): 2006
- Eisenhower Trophy (representing England): 2006
- St Andrews Trophy (representing Great Britain & Ireland): 2006 (winners)
- Bonallack Trophy (representing Europe): 2006 (winners)

== See also ==
- 2006 European Tour Qualifying School graduates
- Lowest rounds of golf
