= 2009 Challenge Tour =

Golf tour season

2009 Challenge Tour season
- Duration: 19 March 2009 – 31 October 2009
- Number of official events: 24 (Note: One further tournament was scheduled but was removed from the schedule.)
- Most wins: (Italy) Edoardo Molinari (3)
- Rankings: (Italy) Edoardo Molinari

The 2009 Challenge Tour was the 21st season of the Challenge Tour, the official development tour to the European Tour.

== Schedule ==
The following table lists official events during the 2009 season.

Date	Tournament	Host country	Purse (€)	Winner (Note: The number in brackets after each winner's name is the number of Challenge Tour events they had won up to and including that tournament. This information is only shown for Challenge Tour members. It is rare for someone to accumulate many wins on the Challenge Tour as success at this level usually leads to promotion to the European Tour.)	OWGR points	Other tours (Note: EUR − European Tour; NGL − Nordic Golf League; TLA − Tour de las Américas.)	Notes
22 Mar	Club Colombia Masters	Colombia	US$200,000	(Argentina) Alan Wagner (1)	12	TLA	
19 Apr	Tusker Kenya Open	Kenya	180,000	(England) Gary Boyd (1)	12		
3 May	Moroccan Classic	Morocco	140,000	(England) Robert Coles (2)	12		
17 May	Allianz Open Côtes d'Armor Bretagne	France	150,000	(England) Lee S. James (5)	12		
24 May	Piemonte Open	Italy	150,000	(Italy) Edoardo Molinari (3)	12		
31 May	Telenet Trophy	Belgium	150,000	(France) François Calmels (1)	12		
7 Jun	Kärnten Golf Open	Austria	140,000	(Germany) Christoph Günther (1)	12		New tournament
14 Jun	Challenge of Ireland	Ireland	150,000	(England) Robert Coles (3)	12		
21 Jun	Saint-Omer Open	France	600,000	(Sweden) Christian Nilsson (1)	18	EUR	
28 Jun	The Princess	Sweden	300,000	(England) Andrew Butterfield (1)	12		New tournament
5 Jul	Credit Suisse Challenge	Switzerland	140,000	(England) Peter Baker (3)	12		
12 Jul	Allianz EurOpen de Lyon	France	150,000	(France) Alexandre Kaleka (1)	12		
26 Jul	SWALEC Wales Challenge	Wales	150,000	(Wales) Rhys Davies (1)	12		
2 Aug	Scottish Hydro Challenge	Scotland	200,000	(Scotland) Jamie McLeary (1)	12		
9 Aug	SK Golf Challenge	Finland	175,000	(Belgium) Nicolas Colsaerts (1)	12		
16 Aug	Trophée du Golf de Genève	Switzerland	210,000	(France) Julien Quesne (1)	12		
~~27 Aug~~	Chinese Challenge	China	–	Removed	–		New tournament
30 Aug	DHL Wrocław Open	Poland	140,000	(Scotland) Eric Ramsay (1)	12		
6 Sep	Fred Olsen Challenge de España	Spain	150,000	(Wales) Rhys Davies (2)	12		
13 Sep	Dutch Futures	Netherlands	150,000	(Belgium) Nicolas Colsaerts (2)	12		
20 Sep	Kazakhstan Open	Kazakhstan	400,000	(Italy) Edoardo Molinari (4)	12		
4 Oct	ECCO Tour Championship	Denmark	180,000	(Portugal) José-Filipe Lima (3)	12	NGL	
11 Oct	Allianz Golf Open Grand Toulouse	France	150,000	(England) John Parry (1)	12		
25 Oct	Italian Federation Cup	Italy	150,000	(Italy) Edoardo Molinari (5) (Note: Molinari earned immediate promotion to the European Tour, as this was his third win of the season.)	12		
31 Oct	Apulia San Domenico Grand Final	Italy	300,000	(Scotland) Peter Whiteford (3)	12		Tour Championship

== Rankings ==
The rankings were based on prize money won during the season, calculated in Euros. The top 20 players on the rankings earned status to play on the 2010 European Tour.

Rank	Player	Prize money (€)
1	(Italy) Edoardo Molinari	242,980
2	(Portugal) José-Filipe Lima	134,622
3	(Belgium) Nicolas Colsaerts	128,590
4	(Wales) Rhys Davies	113,187
5	(Scotland) Peter Whiteford	110,593
