= David Dixon (golfer) =

English golfer (born 1977)

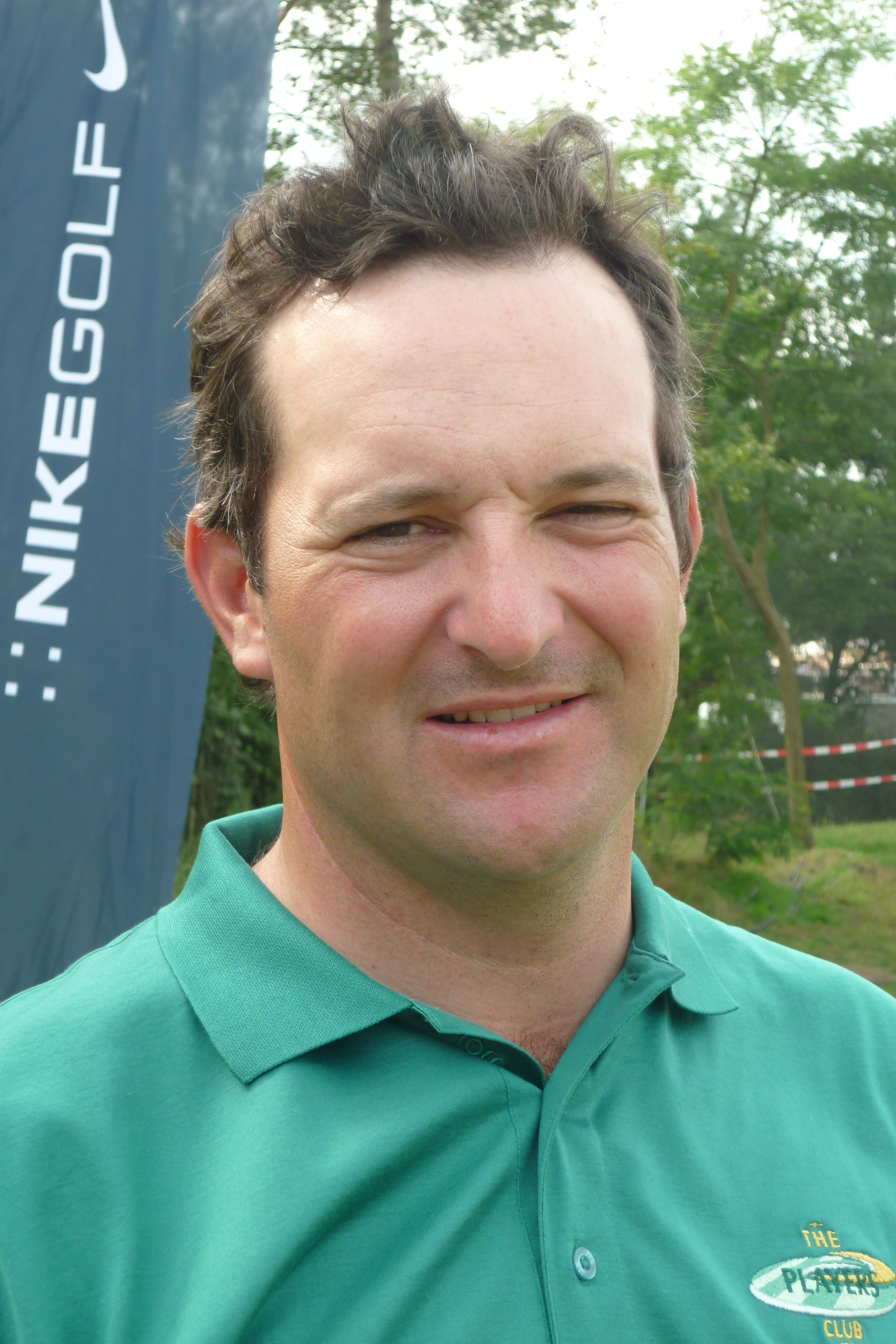

Personal information
- Nationality: England
- Born: 27 March 1977 (age 49) Bridgwater, England
- Height: 5 ft 11 in (1.80 m)
- Weight: 210 lb (95 kg; 15 st)
- Children: 1

Career
- Sport: Golf
- Turned professional: 2001
- Current tour: Challenge Tour
- Former tour: European Tour
- Professional wins: 11

Number of wins by tour
- European Tour: 1
- Challenge Tour: 1
- Other: 9

Best results in major championships
- Masters Tournament: DNP
- PGA Championship: DNP
- U.S. Open: DNP
- The Open Championship: T30: 2001

David Dixon (born 27 March 1977) is an English professional golfer.

== Career ==
Dixon was born in Bridgwater, Somerset, England. He turned professional in 2001.

Dixon had a glittering amateur career, the highlight of which was his performance at the 2001 Open Championship, where he earned the silver medal as the lowest finishing amateur.

Dixon bounced between the European Tour and the Challenge Tour between 2001 and 2007. However, in 2008 he secured his first ever professional win, and his status as a European Tour member, with victory at the Saint-Omer Open. He was never able to follow up his win and in 2019, he won the Matchroom Sport Championship on the PGA EuroPro Tour.

== Amateur wins ==
- 2000 Lytham Trophy
- 2001 South African Amateur Championship

== Professional wins (11) ==
=== European Tour wins (1) ===
No.	Date	Tournament	Winning score	Margin of victory	Runner-up
1	15 Jun 2008	Saint-Omer Open^{1}	−5 (77-67-69-66=279)	1 stroke	(Sweden) Christian Nilsson

^{1}Dual-ranking event with the Challenge Tour

=== Challenge Tour wins (1) ===
No.	Date	Tournament	Winning score	Margin of victory	Runner-up
1	15 Jun 2008	Saint-Omer Open^{1}	−5 (77-67-69-66=279)	1 stroke	(Sweden) Christian Nilsson

^{1}Dual-ranking event with the European Tour

=== PGA EuroPro Tour wins (1) ===
No.	Date	Tournament	Winning score	Margin of victory	Runners-up
1	31 May 2019	Matchroom Sport Championship	−13 (70-66-67=203)	Playoff	(England) Seve Benson, (England) Dave Coupland

=== Jamega Pro Golf Tour wins (8) ===
No.	Date	Tournament	Winning score	Margin of victory	Runner(s)-up
1	6 Aug 2013	Donnington Grove	−3 (67-74=141)	Playoff	(England) Ben Jones
2	8 Oct 2013	Woodcote Park	−9 (68-67=135)	2 strokes	(England) Paul Streeter
3	19 Mar 2014	La Monacilla	−4 (72-68=140)	2 strokes	(Scotland) Callum Macauley, (England) Ryan O'Neill, (Scotland) Elliot Saltman
4	10 Jun 2014	Mentmore - Rothschild 2	−7 (68-69=137)	2 strokes	(England) Rory Kirwan, (England) Martin Sell
5	17 Jun 2014	Studley Wood	−6 (68-68=138)	1 stroke	(Wales) Mark Laskey, (England) Jon White
6	28 Apr 2015	Machynys	−2 (69-73=142)	4 strokes	(England) Ryan Boyns, (England) Nick Cunningham, (England) Craig Farrelly, (England) James Watts
7	28 Jul 2015	Magnolia Park	−11 (68-67=135)	8 strokes	(England) Craig Adams
8	3 Jul 2018	Leatherhead Trophy	−8 (69-65=134)	3 strokes	(England) Luke Johnson

=== Other wins (1) ===
- 2018 PGA Play-offs

== Results in major championships ==
Tournament	2001
The Open Championship	T30LA

Note: Dixon only played in The Open Championship.
LA = Low Amateur
"T" = tied

== European Tour career summary ==
Year	Earnings (€)	Ranking
2001	60,180	161
2002	3,070	292
2003	81,746	158
2004	69,102	157
2005	9,638	262
2006	101,142	151
2007	4,500	323
2008	240,032	114
2009	295,472	107
2010	213,599	114
2011	175,108	139
2012	45,274	194
2013	4,900	262
2015	7,200	260

== Team appearances ==
- PGA Cup (representing Great Britain and Ireland): 2015 (winners), 2019

== See also ==
- 2005 European Tour Qualifying School graduates
- 2007 European Tour Qualifying School graduates
- 2011 European Tour Qualifying School graduates
- 2015 European Tour Qualifying School graduates
