= William Harrold =

English golfer (born 1988)

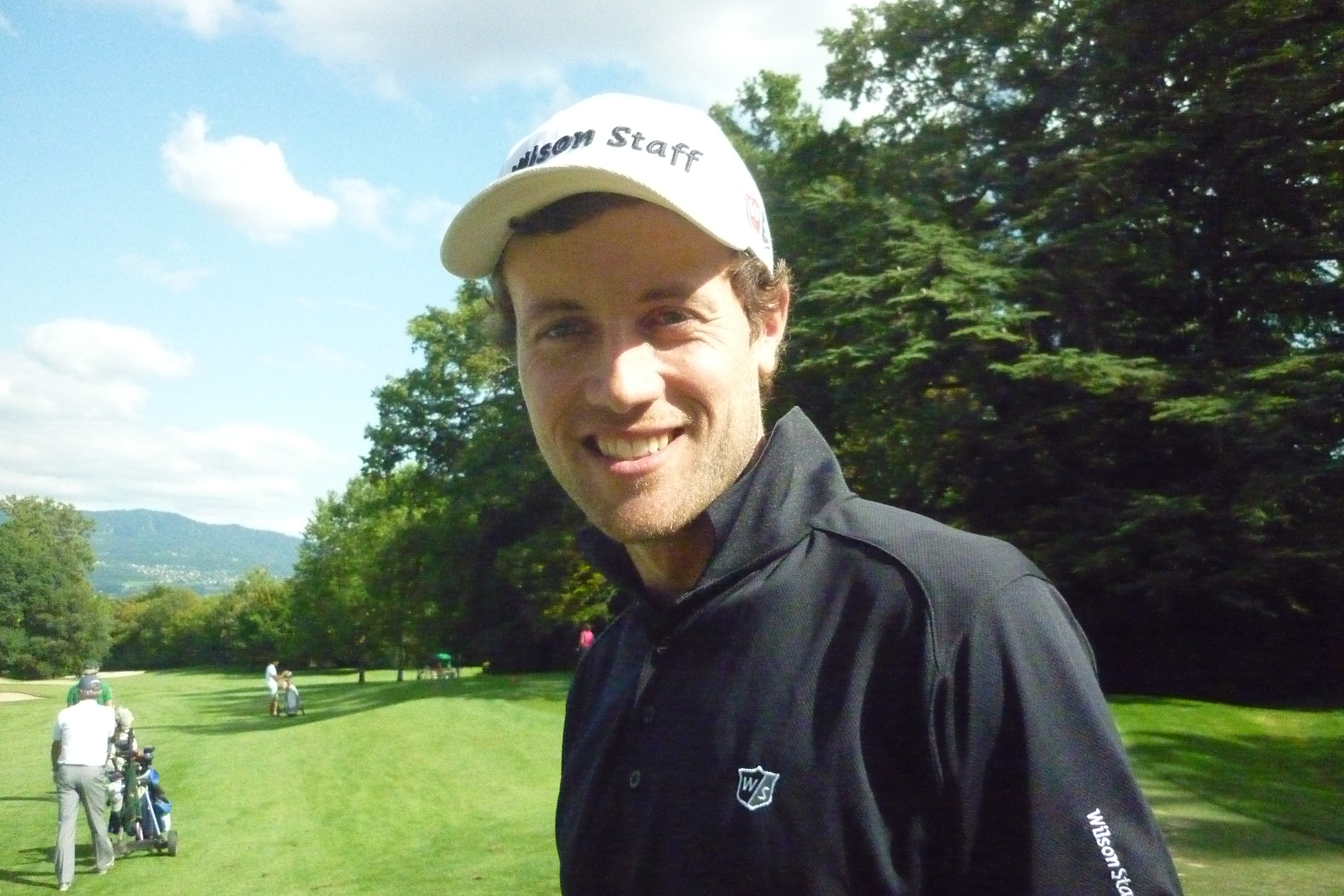

Personal information
- Full name: William Ashley Harrold
- Nationality: England
- Born: 3 May 1988 (age 38) Norwich, England
- Height: 6 ft 2 in (1.88 m)
- Weight: 174 lb (79 kg; 12.4 st)

Career
- Sport: Golf
- College: University of Missouri
- Turned professional: 2012
- Current tour: Asian Tour
- Former tours: Web.com Tour; Challenge Tour; PGA Tour China; Asian Development Tour; PGA EuroPro Tour; MENA Tour
- Professional wins: 8

Number of wins by tour
- Challenge Tour: 1
- Other: 7

William Ashley Harrold (born 3 May 1988) is an English professional golfer.

== Career ==
Harrold played college golf at the University of Missouri.

In 2012, Harrold turned professional. He played on mini-tours including the PGA EuroPro Tour and MENA Golf Tour winning three events. His first win on a major tour was the 2014 Belgian Challenge Open on the Challenge Tour.

== Professional wins (8) ==
=== Challenge Tour wins (1) ===
No.	Date	Tournament	Winning score	Margin of victory	Runner-up
1	29 Jun 2014	Belgian Challenge Open	−18 (70-63-67-66=266)	Playoff	(Germany) Florian Fritsch

Challenge Tour playoff record (1–0)

No.	Year	Tournament	Opponent	Result
1	2014	Belgian Challenge Open	(Germany) Florian Fritsch	Won with par on first extra hole

=== PGA EuroPro Tour wins (2) ===
No.	Date	Tournament	Winning score	Margin of victory	Runner-up
1	17 Apr 2014	Matchroom Championship	−4 (69-72-71=212)	1 stroke	(England) Jack Senior
2	23 May 2014	Dawson and Sanderson Travel Classic	−3 (70-67-76=213)	Playoff	(Wales) Bradley Dredge

=== MENA Tour wins (2) ===
No.	Date	Tournament	Winning score	Margin of victory	Runner-up
1	31 Oct 2012	MENA Golf Tour Championship	−17 (64-65-67=196)	1 stroke	(Wales) Stephen Dodd
2	20 Apr 2023	Malaysian Swing II	−10 (64-69-73=206)	2 strokes	(Malaysia) Ervin Chang

=== Hi5 Pro Tour wins (3) ===
No.	Date	Tournament	Winning score	Margin of victory	Runner-up
1	3 Mar 2012	Lumine Lakes Open 2	−4 (70-68=138)	1 stroke	(Denmark) Rasmus Hansen
2	6 Mar 2012	Lumine Hills Open	−1 (76-67=143)	1 stroke	(Germany) Florian Fritsch
3	9 Mar 2012	Hi5 Match Play Final	4 and 2		(Germany) Florian Fritsch
