= Todd Clements =

English professional golfer

Personal information
- Nationality: England
- Born: 29 August 1996 (age 30) Colchester, England

Career
- Sport: Golf
- Turned professional: 2018
- Current tour: European Tour
- Former tours: Challenge Tour; PGA EuroPro Tour; MENA Tour
- Professional wins: 5

Number of wins by tour
- European Tour: 1
- Challenge Tour: 1
- Other: 3

Todd Clements (born 29 August 1996) is an English professional golfer who plays on the European Tour. He won the D+D Real Czech Masters in August 2023.

== Professional career ==
Clements turned professional in 2018 and played on the PGA EuroPro Tour in 2019. He won the IFX Payments Championship in May and the Macdonald Hill Valley Hotel, Golf & Spa event in August. He finished fifth on the Order of Merit, earning a card for the 2020 Challenge Tour season, and improved his Challenge Tour status by making the cut at the European Tour Qualifying School.

Clements played on the Challenge Tour from 2020 to 2022. In 2022, he finished 16th in the rankings, including a win at the Irish Challenge in July, to earn a card for the 2023 European Tour season.

In August 2023, Clements claimed his first European Tour win at the D+D Real Czech Masters. He shot a final-round 63 to win by one shot ahead of Matt Wallace.

== Personal life ==
Clements is in a relationship with German Ladies European Tour player Olivia Cowan.

== Amateur wins ==
- 2017 English Amateur
- 2018 European Nations Cup – Copa Sotogrande

== Professional wins (5) ==
=== European Tour wins (1) ===
No.	Date	Tournament	Winning score	Margin of victory	Runner-up
1	27 Aug 2023	D+D Real Czech Masters	−22 (65-69-69-63=266)	1 stroke	(England) Matt Wallace

=== Challenge Tour wins (1) ===
No.	Date	Tournament	Winning score	Margin of victory	Runner-up
1	31 Jul 2022	Irish Challenge	−19 (66-65-70-68=269)	6 strokes	(Northern Ireland) Tom McKibbin

=== PGA EuroPro Tour wins (2) ===
No.	Date	Tournament	Winning score	Margin of victory	Runner(s)-up
1	24 May 2019	IFX Payments Championship	−16 (68-68-67=203)	2 strokes	(England) Andrew Wilson
2	23 Aug 2019	Macdonald Hill Valley Hotel, Golf & Spa	−10 (67-69-67=203)	1 stroke	(England) Jamie Dick, (England) Richard Mansell, (England) John Parry, (England) Mitch Waite

=== Other wins (1) ===
No.	Date	Tournament	Winning score	Margin of victory	Runner-up
1	1 Dec 2018	Saudi Open	−8 (208)	2 strokes	(England) Jamie Elson

== Team appearances ==
Amateur

- European Amateur Team Championship (representing England): 2018
- St Andrews Trophy (representing Great Britain & Ireland): 2018
- Bonallack Trophy (representing Europe): 2018

== See also ==
- 2022 Challenge Tour graduates
