= Duncan Stewart (golfer) =

Scottish golfer (born 1984)

Personal information
- Nationality: Scotland
- Born: 24 May 1984 (age 42) Grantown-on-Spey, Scotland
- Height: 1.83 m (6 ft 0 in)
- Weight: 76 kg (168 lb; 12.0 st)

Career
- Sport: Golf
- College: Jacksonville University
- Turned professional: 2007
- Current tours: Challenge Tour; European Tour
- Former tour: PGA EuroPro Tour
- Professional wins: 4

Number of wins by tour
- Challenge Tour: 1
- Other: 3

Duncan Stewart (born 24 May 1984) is a Scottish professional golfer who was born in Grantown-on-Spey, Scotland. He turned professional in 2007 and played on mini-tours, winning three events on the PGA EuroPro Tour from 2011 to 2012.

In 2012, he finished second in the EuroPro Tour Order of Merit, to earn a place on the Challenge Tour for 2013. In his first full season, he finished in 20th place in the Challenge Tour rankings, and was able to play 10 events on the European Tour in 2014.

He won the 2016 Challenge de Madrid on the Challenge Tour.

== Professional wins (4) ==
=== Challenge Tour wins (1) ===
No.	Date	Tournament	Winning score	Margin of victory	Runner-up
1	1 May 2016	Challenge de Madrid	−8 (69-66-71-66=272)	1 stroke	(England) Ben Stow

=== PGA EuroPro Tour wins (3) ===
No.	Date	Tournament	Winning score	Margin of victory	Runner(s)-up
1	22 Jul 2011	ABC Solutions UK Championship	−9 (69-73-65=207)	1 stroke	(Scotland) Paul Doherty, (England) Paul Grannell, (England) Adam Stott
2	1 Sep 2012	Sweetspot Classic	−2 (66-72-70=208)	2 strokes	(England) James Ruth
3	14 Sep 2012	Sweetspot Masters	−17 (65-68-69=202)	8 strokes	(England) Billy Fowles, (England) Dale Whitnell

== Team appearances ==
Professional

- World Cup (representing Scotland): 2016

== See also ==
- 2016 Challenge Tour graduates
