= Andrew Wilson (golfer) =

English professional golfer (born 1994)

Personal information
- Nationality: England
- Born: March 29, 1994 (age 32)

Career
- Sport: Golf
- Turned professional: 2018
- Current tour: European Tour
- Former tours: Challenge Tour; PGA EuroPro Tour
- Professional wins: 1

Best results in major championships
- Masters Tournament: DNP
- PGA Championship: DNP
- U.S. Open: DNP
- The Open Championship: T32: 2019

Andrew Wilson (born 29 March 1994) is an English professional golfer.

As an amateur, Wilson competed on the British Universities and Colleges Sport circuit. He also competed at the Men's Home Internationals.

Wilson qualified for the 2019 Open Championship through regional qualifying at Notts Golf Club. This was his first major championship. He finished tied for 32nd.

Wilson played on the PGA EuroPro Tour in 2019, winning the Motocaddy Masters in early July.

== Amateur wins ==
- 2013 North of England Open Youths
- 2014 BUCS Student Tour - Dundonald, BUCS Student Tour 1
- 2016 BUCS Golf Tour - Dundonald Tournament
- 2017 BUCS Golf Tour - English & Welsh Championships, Lee Westwood Trophy

== Professional wins (1) ==
=== PGA EuroPro Tour wins (1) ===
No.	Date	Tournament	Winning score	Margin of victory	Runners-up
1	5 Jul 2019	Motocaddy Masters	−10 (67-72-67=206)	1 stroke	(England) James Allan, (Scotland) Neil Fenwick, (England) Richard Mansell, (England) Alfie Plant, (Republic of Ireland) Tim Rice, (England) Rhys Thompson

== Results in major championships ==
Tournament	2019
Masters Tournament	
PGA Championship	
U.S. Open	
The Open Championship	T32

Did not play

"T" = tied for place

== See also ==
- 2021 Challenge Tour graduates
- 2022 European Tour Qualifying School graduates
- 2023 European Tour Qualifying School graduates
- 2026 Challenge Tour graduates
