= Jack Senior =

English golfer (born 1988)

Personal information
- Nationality: England
- Born: 18 July 1988 (age 38)
- Height: 6 ft 0 in (1.83 m)

Career
- Sport: Golf
- Turned professional: 2011
- Current tour: European Tour
- Former tours: Challenge Tour; PGA EuroPro Tour; Alps Tour
- Professional wins: 6

Number of wins by tour
- Challenge Tour: 2
- Other: 4

Best results in major championships
- Masters Tournament: DNP
- PGA Championship: DNP
- U.S. Open: DNP
- The Open Championship: T67: 2021

Jack Senior (born 18 July 1988) is an English professional golfer who plays on the European Tour. He has won twice on the Challenge Tour.

== Amateur career ==
Senior won the Egyptian Amateur in 2010 and the New South Wales Amateur and Lytham Trophy in 2011. He played on the winning Great Britain & Ireland team in the 2011 Walker Cup and turned professional shortly after.

== Professional career ==
Senior has played on the Alps Tour and the PGA EuroPro Tour. He won twice on the Alps Tour in 2012 and twice on the PGA EuroPro Tour in 2014.

From 2012 to 2019 Senior played primarily on the Challenge Tour. He won his first Challenge Tour event in 2015 at the SSE Scottish Hydro Challenge. He beat Robert Coles and Prom Meesawat with a birdie at the fourth hole of a sudden-death playoff. He won for the second time on the tour at the 2019 ISPS Handa World Invitational beating Matthew Baldwin at the second hole of the playoff. He was also runner-up in the Lalla Aïcha Challenge Tour and finished the 2019 season 6th in the Challenge Tour Order of Merit to earn a place on the 2020 European Tour.

== Amateur wins ==
- 2010 South of England Amateur, Egyptian Amateur Open
- 2011 New South Wales Amateur, Lytham Trophy, Hampshire Hog

== Professional wins (6) ==
=== Challenge Tour wins (2) ===
No.	Date	Tournament	Winning score	Margin of victory	Runner(s)-up
1	28 Jun 2015	SSE Scottish Hydro Challenge	−16 (66-69-66-67=268)	Playoff	(England) Robert Coles, (Thailand) Prom Meesawat
2	18 Aug 2019	ISPS Handa World Invitational	−11 (68-68-66-67=269)	Playoff	(England) Matthew Baldwin

Challenge Tour playoff record (2–0)

No.	Year	Tournament	Opponent(s)	Result
1	2015	SSE Scottish Hydro Challenge	(England) Robert Coles, (Thailand) Prom Meesawat	Won with birdie on fourth extra hole
2	2019	ISPS Handa World Invitational	(England) Matthew Baldwin	Won with birdie on second extra hole

=== PGA EuroPro Tour wins (2) ===
No.	Date	Tournament	Winning score	Margin of victory	Runner(s)-up
1	1 May 2014	Eagle Orchid Scottish Masters	−5 (71-66=137)	Playoff	(Wales) James Frazer, (Scotland) Elliot Saltman
2	31 May 2014	Kerry London Championship	−9 (68-68-71=207)	1 stroke	(England) Sam Connor

=== Alps Tour wins (2) ===
No.	Date	Tournament	Winning score	Margin of victory	Runner-up
1	12 May 2012	Servizitalia Lignano Open	−11 (68-68-69=205)	Playoff	(Spain) Jesús Legarrea
2	3 Jun 2012	Open de Saint François Guadeloupe	−21 (65-68-64-66=263)	10 strokes	(France) Thomas Fournier

== Results in major championships ==
Tournament	2016	2017	2018	2019	2020	2021
The Open Championship	CUT		CUT	CUT	NT	T67

Did not play

CUT = missed the half-way cut
"T" = Tied
NT = No tournament due to COVID-19 pandemic
Note: Senior only played in The Open Championship.

== Team appearances ==
Amateur

- Walker Cup (representing Great Britain & Ireland): 2011 (winners)
- European Amateur Team Championship (representing England): 2011

== See also ==
- 2019 Challenge Tour graduates
- 2024 Challenge Tour graduates
