= 2002 Eisenhower Trophy =

Coordinates: 3.106°N 101.575°E

Tournament information
- Dates: 24–27 October
- Location: Kuala Lumpur, Malaysia
- Courses: Saujana Golf and Country Club; Palm and Bunga Raya courses
- Format: 72 holes stroke play

Statistics
- Par: 72 (Palm); 72 (Bunga Raya)
- Field: 63 teams 188 players

Champion
- United States; Ricky Barnes, Hunter Mahan & D. J. Trahan
- 568 (−8)

The 2002 Eisenhower Trophy took place 24–27 October on the Palm and Bunga Raya courses at Saujana Golf and Country Club in Kuala Lumpur, Malaysia. It was the 23rd World Amateur Team Championship for the Eisenhower Trophy. The tournament was a 72-hole stroke play team event with 63 three-man teams. The best two scores for each round counted towards the team total. Each team was due to play two rounds on the two courses. The leading teams played on the Bunga Raya course on the third day and were due to play on the Palm course on the final day.

After heavy rain and lightning on the final morning, a cut was introduced and only the leading 20 teams played the final round. Positions 21 to 63 were determined by scores after three rounds. The leading 33 teams had played their third round on the Bunga Raya course while the others played on the Palm course.

The United States won their 12th Eisenhower Trophy, three strokes ahead of France, who took the silver medal. Australia and the Philippines tied for third place and took the bronze medals. Marcus Fraser had the best 72-hole aggregate of 281, 7 under par.

This was the first World Amateur Team Championship with teams of three; previous championships had teams of four with the best three scores for each round counting. England, Scotland, Wales, and Ireland (a combined Republic of Ireland and Northern Ireland team) competed as separate teams for the first time, whereas in previous championships a combined Great Britain and Ireland team had competed.

The 2004 Espirito Santo Trophy was played on the same courses one week prior.

== Teams ==
63 teams contested the event. Each team had three players with exception of Russia who only had two.

The following table lists the players on the leading teams.

Country	Players
Argentina	Matias Anselmo, Fernando Chiesa, Carlos Pedrozo
Australia	Andrew Buckle, Marcus Fraser, Adam Groom
Austria	Thomas Kogler, Thomas Ortner, Martin Wiegele
Brazil	Phillipe Gasnier, Roberto Gomez, Fernando Mechereffe
Canada	Lee Curry, James Lepp, Dan Swanson
Chinese Taipei	Chang Hong-wei, Cheng Chen-liang, Sung Mao-chang
Colombia	Manuel Merizalde, Andrés Mauricio Rodríguez, Camilo Villegas
Denmark	Jeppe Huldahl, Mads Iversen, Anders Schmidt Hansen
England	Jamie Elson, Richard Walker, Gary Wolstenholme
Finland	Toni Karjalainen, Janne Mommo, Thomas Sundström
France	Grégory Bourdy, Eric Chaudouet, Raphaël Pellicioli
Germany	Markus Maichel, Christian Reimbold, Michael Thannhäuser
Ireland	Noel Fox, Justin Kehoe, Colm Moriarty
Italy	Edoardo Molinari, Francesco Molinari, Andrea Romano
Japan	Toyokazu Fujishima, Futoshi Fujita, Yūsaku Miyazato
Netherlands	Niels Boysen, Edward de Jong, Inder van Weerelt
New Zealand	Eddie Lee, Brad Shilton, Tim Wilkinson
Norway	Lars Brovold, Jan-Are Larsen, Torstein Nævestad
Philippines	Jerome Delariarte, Juvic Pagunsan, Angelo Que
Scotland	Jack Doherty, Graham Gordon, Simon Mackenzie
South Africa	Louis Oosthuizen, Shaun Norris, Charl Schwartzel
South Korea	Byung Kwan Kim, Hyun Woo Kim, Si Woo Sung
Spain	Gonzalo Fernández-Castaño, Alfredo García-Heredia, Pablo Martín
Sweden	Niklas Lemke, Pär Nilsson, Wilhelm Schauman
Switzerland	Julien Clément, Martin Rominger, Nicolas Sulzer
Thailand	Wisut Artjanawat, Chaddanai Choksuwanlap, Prom Meesawat
United States	Ricky Barnes, Hunter Mahan, D. J. Trahan
Wales	Nigel Edwards, Lee Harpin, David Price

== Results ==
Place	Country	Score	To par
1st place, gold medalist(s)	United States	137-149-142-140=568	−8
2nd place, silver medalist(s)	France	142-144-139-146=571	−5
3rd place, bronze medalist(s)	Australia	152-143-137-142=574	−2
3rd place, bronze medalist(s)	Philippines	146-145-143-140=574	−2
T5	Austria	150-140-144-141=575	−1
T5	New Zealand	149-142-144-140=575	−1
7	England	143-147-145-143=578	+2
8	Colombia	143-153-143-141=580	+4
9	Italy	150-150-137-144=581	+5
10	Spain	148-147-140-147=582	+6
T11	Chinese Taipei	150-141-148-144=583	+7
T11	Sweden	144-154-141-144=583	+7
13	Netherlands	150-152-141-142=585	+9
14	Wales	151-143-144-148=586	+10
T15	Argentina	143-146-147-152=588	+12
T15	Germany	148-144-147-149=588	+12
T15	Switzerland	151-145-146-146=588	+12
18	Finland	143-148-148-152=591	+15
19	Norway	150-148-144-150=592	+16
20	Thailand	143-152-145-153=593	+17

Because of bad weather there was a cut and only the leading 20 teams played the final round.

Place	Country	Score	To par
T21	Brazil	150-148-146=444	+12
T21	Denmark	146-150-148=444	+12
T21	Japan	155-143-146=444	+12
T21	Scotland	150-149-145=444	+12
T21	South Africa	155-147-142=444	+12
T21	South Korea	144-152-148=444	+12
27	India	155-146-144=445	+13
T28	Ireland	151-144-152=447	+15
T28	Malaysia	147-149-151=447	+15
30	Venezuela	150-153-145=448	+16
T31	Canada	157-147-146=450	+18
T31	Chile	160-145-145=450	+18
33	Pakistan	148-149-154=451	+19
T34	Portugal	144-158-152=454	+22
T34	Puerto Rico	150-151-153=454	+22
T36	Czech Republic	155-150-153=458	+26
T36	Paraguay	152-155-151=458	+26
38	Ecuador	153-155-152=460	+28
39	Iceland	150-155-156=461	+29
40	Mexico	161-152-149=462	+30
T41	Guatemala	152-160-151=463	+31
T41	Slovenia	158-149-156=463	+31
43	El Salvador	159-149-157=465	+33
44	Bolivia	167-146-154=467	+35
45	Hong Kong	156-154-158=468	+36
46	Costa Rica	167-145-157=469	+37
47	Zimbabwe	155-156-160=471	+39
48	Bermuda	159-156-157=472	+40
49	Belgium	161-159-155=475	+43
50	Eswatini	152-160-164=476	+44
51	Singapore	157-158-162=477	+45
52	Turkey	157-159-163=479	+47
53	Egypt	161-161-161=483	+51
54	Greece	167-160-165=492	+60
55	Russia	166-163-170=499	+67
56	Lebanon	164-167-171=502	+70
57	Slovakia	179-159-172=510	+78
58	Panama	166-171-174=511	+79
59	Estonia	173-171-175=519	+87
60	Latvia	175-177-172=524	+92
61	Croatia	186-176-178=540	+108
T62	Iran	186-180-180=546	+114
T62	Saudi Arabia	181-186-179=546	+114

The leading 33 teams played their third round on the Bunga Raya course with the remaining teams playing on the Palm course.

== Individual leaders ==
There was no official recognition for the lowest individual scores.

Place	Player	Country	Score	To par
1	Marcus Fraser	Australia	74-70-67-70=281	−7
2	Grégory Bourdy	France	70-69-71-72=282	−6
3	Angelo Que	Philippines	72-70-69-72=283	−5
4	Tim Wilkinson	New Zealand	77-69-69-69=284	−4
5	Camilo Villegas	Colombia	68-75-72-71=286	−2
6	Hunter Mahan	United States	68-72-71-77=288	E
7	Martin Wiegele	Austria	78-71-70-70=289	+1
T8	Jamie Elson	England	71-77-71-71=290	+2
T8	Edoardo Molinari	Italy	76-77-66-71=290	+2
T10	Michael Thannhäuser	Germany	72-72-73-74=291	+3
T10	D. J. Trahan	United States	76-78-71-66=291	+3
T10	Gary Wolstenholme	England	74-71-74-72=291	+3

Only players in the leading 20 teams completed four rounds. Of the players from the remaining teams, who only completed three rounds, Benjamín Alvarado from Chile had the best score of 217, 1-over-par.
