= Justin Kehoe =

Irish golfer

Personal information
- Nationality: Ireland
- Born: 14 February 1980 (age 46)
- Height: 1.78 m (5 ft 10 in)

Career
- Sport: Golf
- College: University College Dublin
- Turned professional: 2003
- Former tours: Challenge Tour; PGA EuroPro Tour

Best results in major championships
- Masters Tournament: DNP
- PGA Championship: DNP
- U.S. Open: DNP
- The Open Championship: CUT: 2007

Justin Kehoe (born 14 February 1980) is a retired Irish professional golfer. He played on the Challenge Tour and as amateur won the 2002 World University Golf Championship.

== Career ==
Kehoe, from Birr, County Offaly, won the 2001 South of Ireland Amateur Championship with a 6&4 against Stephen Browne. In 2002, he secured victory at the World University Golf Championship in Taiwan, six strokes ahead of Martin Rominger of Switzerland.

Kehoe turned professional at the end of 2003 and was a touring professional for six years between 2004 and 2009, before becoming a chartered accountant. He played mainly on the PGA EuroPro Tour and on the Challenge Tour, where he appeared in over forty events with a best finish of tied 12th at the 2004 Al Ahram-Jolie Ville Sharm El Sheikh Challenge.

Kehoe qualified for the 2007 Open Championship at Carnoustie, coming through local final qualifying at Montrose Golf Club in Scotland. He missed the cut following the first 36 holes.

== Amateur wins ==
- 2001 South of Ireland Amateur Championship
- 2002 World University Golf Championship

== Results in major championships ==
Tournament	2007
The Open Championship	CUT

Note: Kehoe only played in The Open Championship.
CUT = missed the half-way cut

== Team appearances ==
Amateur

- European Boys' Team Championship (representing Ireland): 1998 (winners)
- Jacques Léglise Trophy (representing Great Britain & Ireland): 1998 (winners)
- European Youths' Team Championship (representing Ireland): 2000
- Palmer Cup (representing Great Britain & Ireland): 2001, 2002
- Eisenhower Trophy (representing Ireland): 2002
- European Amateur Team Championship (representing Ireland): 2003
