= Simon Robinson (golfer) =

English professional golfer (born 1981)

Personal information
- Full name: Simon Scott Robinson
- Nationality: England
- Born: 16 February 1981 (age 45) Hartlepool, England
- Height: 1.89 m (6 ft 2 in)
- Weight: 80 kg (180 lb; 13 st)

Career
- Sport: Golf
- College: University of Houston
- Turned professional: 2004
- Former tours: Challenge Tour; PGA EuroPro Tour
- Professional wins: 4

Number of wins by tour
- Challenge Tour: 1
- Other: 3

Simon Robinson (born 16 February 1981) is an English professional golfer.

== Early life and amateur career ==
Robinson was born in Hartlepool and got into golf at age six, when his grandparents became stewards at Seaton Carew Golf Club. He was successful as a junior playing with the English national team, in 1999 winning both the Junior Golf World Cup in Japan and the European Boys' Team Championship in Sweden, where he beat Edoardo Molinari 5&4 in the final.

In 2000, he won the bronze in the World University Golf Championship at Coleraine, behind Graeme McDowell and Nicklos Rousey. He lost the final of the 2001 English Amateur to Scott Godfrey 4&3.

He played college golf at the University of Houston.

== Professional career ==
Robinson turned professional in 2004 and has played predominantly on the lower level tours. In 2005 he won three times on the PGA EuroPro Tour to finish in third place on the Order of Merit and earn his place on the second tier Challenge Tour for 2006.

Robinson played on the Challenge Tour for four seasons. His best year was 2008 when he claimed his first title on the tour, the SK Golf Challenge held in Finland, where he shot 63 in the final round to win by six. He finished 46th on the end of season rankings.

== Professional wins (4) ==
=== Challenge Tour wins (1) ===
No.	Date	Tournament	Winning score	Margin of victory	Runners-up
1	15 Jun 2008	SK Golf Challenge	−13 (73-66-69-63=271)	6 strokes	(Australia) John Wade, (England) Andrew Willey

=== PGA EuroPro Tour wins (3) ===
No.	Date	Tournament	Winning score	Margin of victory	Runner-up
1	22 Jul 2005	Swallow Suffolk Open	−13 (203)	2 strokes	(England) Darren Prosser
2	29 Jul 2005	Oakley International Open	−10 (64-73-69=206)	Playoff	
3	3 Sep 2005	Golf Pages Classic	−11 (64-68-67=199)	2 strokes	(England) Spike Nesbit

== Team appearances ==
Amateur

- Junior Golf World Cup (representing England): 1999 (winners)
- European Boys' Team Championship (representing England): 1999 (winners)
- Palmer Cup (representing Great Britain & Ireland): 2000 (winners)
