= Liam Johnston =

Scottish professional golfer (born 1993)

Personal information
- Nationality: Scotland
- Born: 26 January 1993 (age 33) Dumfries, Scotland
- Height: 1.83 m (6 ft 0 in)

Career
- Sport: Golf
- College: University of Tennessee at Chattanooga
- Turned professional: 2017
- Current tour: Challenge Tour
- Former tours: European Tour; Tartan Pro Tour; Pro Golf Tour
- Professional wins: 4

Number of wins by tour
- Challenge Tour: 3
- Other: 1
Medal record
Representing Great Britain
European Golf Team Championships
| Silver medal – second place | 2018 Gleneagles | Mixed team |

Liam Johnston (born 26 January 1993) is a Scottish professional golfer. He won the Kazakhstan Open and Match Play 9 on the Challenge Tour in 2018.

== Amateur career ==
Johnston had a successful junior career and finished second on the Scottish Boys Order of Merit in 2010 and 2011. He was runner-up at the 2011 Scottish Boys Match Play and the 2011 Scottish Boys Stroke Play. He attended the University of Tennessee at Chattanooga between 2011 and 2015 and graduated with a degree in psychology. He was All-Southern Conference performer with the Chattanooga Mocs men's golf team in 2014 and 2015.

Johnston represented Scotland in the Men's Home Internationals in 2016 and 2017, both times losing to Ireland, and at the 2017 European Amateur Team Championship, where he lost to Sweden in the quarter final together with Craig Howie, Ryan Lumsden, Robert MacIntyre, Jamie Stewart and Connor Syme.

He had a successful 2017 and won the African Amateur Stroke Play Championship and the Scottish Amateur Stroke Play Championship.

== Professional career ==
Johnston turned professional in late 2017 and played on the Challenge Tour in 2018. He won twice, at the Andalucía Costa del Sol Match Play 9 in May and the Kazakhstan Open in September. He finished 10th in the Order of Merit to gain a place on the European Tour for 2019 as one of the 15 2018 Challenge Tour graduates.

Johnston also won a silver medal at the 2018 European Golf Team Championships at Gleneagles, together with a Great Britain made up of Connor Syme, Michele Thomson and Meghan MacLaren.

His best finish on the European Tour in 2019 was joint fifth in the D+D Real Czech Masters, and he finished 148th in the Order of Merit.

In 2020 Johnston fired a career best 61 to lead by a single shot at the end of the first day of the Portugal Masters.

== Amateur wins ==
- 2012 Tennant Cup
- 2017 African Amateur Stroke Play Championship, Scottish Amateur Stroke Play Championship, BUCS Golf Tour - Stirling International

== Professional wins (4) ==
=== Challenge Tour wins (3) ===
| No. | Date | Tournament | Winning score | Margin of victory | Runner-up |
|---|---|---|---|---|---|
| 1 | 20 May 2018 | Andalucía Costa del Sol Match Play 9 | 1 up | | (Scotland) Grant Forrest |
| 2 | 16 Sep 2018 | Kazakhstan Open | −24 (66-67-64-67=264) | 2 strokes | (England) Tom Murray |
| 3 | 12 Jun 2022 | Empordà Challenge | −13 (71-65-64-67=267) | 2 strokes | (England) Todd Clements |

=== Pro Golf Tour wins (1) ===
| No. | Date | Tournament | Winning score | Margin of victory | Runner-up |
|---|---|---|---|---|---|
| 1 | 5 Feb 2018 | Open Prestigia | −13 (71-64-68=203) | 1 stroke | (Germany) Jonas Kölbing |

== Team appearances ==
Amateur

- Men's Home Internationals (representing Scotland): 2016, 2017
- European Amateur Team Championship (representing Scotland): 2017

Professional

- European Championships (representing Great Britain): 2018

== See also ==
- 2018 Challenge Tour graduates
