= Stuart Manley =

Welsh professional golfer

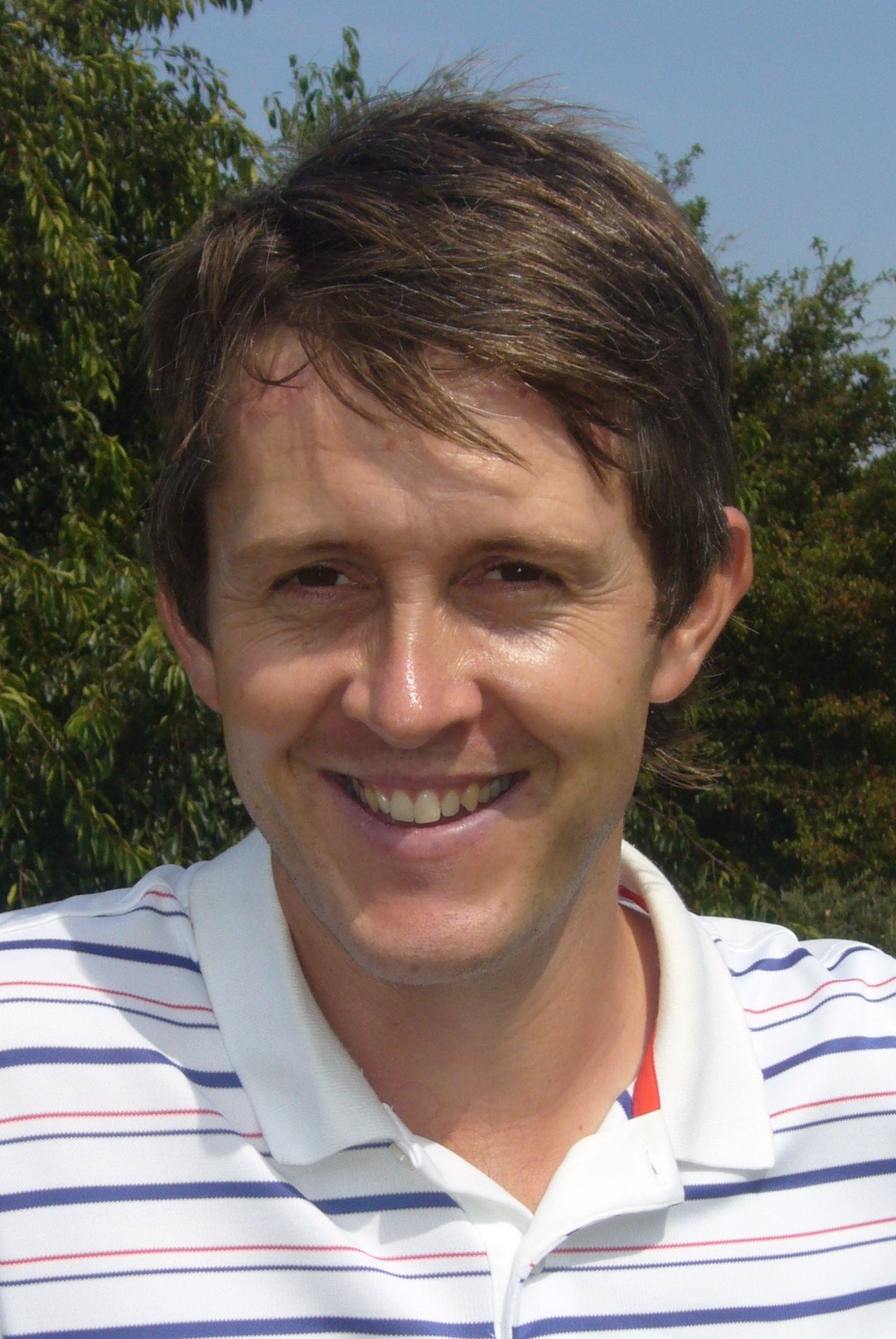

Personal information
- Nationality: Wales
- Born: 15 January 1979 (age 47) Mountain Ash, Rhondda Cynon Taf, Wales
- Height: 1.83 m (6 ft 0 in)
- Weight: 83 kg (183 lb; 13.1 st)
- Spouse: Nichola (m. 2005)

Career
- Sport: Golf
- College: University of West Florida
- Turned professional: 2003
- Current tours: European Tour; Challenge Tour
- Professional wins: 7

Number of wins by tour
- Challenge Tour: 4
- Other: 3

Best results in major championships
- Masters Tournament: DNP
- PGA Championship: DNP
- U.S. Open: DNP
- The Open Championship: CUT: 2017

Stuart Manley (born 15 January 1979) is a Welsh professional golfer.

== Early life and amateur career ==
In 1979, Manley was born in Mountain Ash in the historic county of Glamorgan. He showed sporting promise at an early age, and at age 16 had trials with the football clubs Manchester United, Crystal Palace and Luton Town.

Manley, however, he chose to concentrate on golf, taking a four-year scholarship to the University of West Florida. The highlight of his amateur career was playing in the 2003 Walker Cup.

== Professional career ==
In 2003, Manley turned professional. He immediately joined the Challenge Tour, finishing 90th in his first season. At the end of that year he came through the qualifying school to earn a place on the European Tour for the first time. However, Manley has consistently failed to establish himself at the highest level; he is yet to retain his card by finishing in the top 115 at season's end, and has only regained it via the Challenge Tour in 2007 and qualifying school in 2008, 2010 and 2013.

Manley graduated from the PGA EuroPro Tour in 2012, returning to the Challenge Tour in 2013 where he won the Finnish Challenge. He narrowly missed out on winning a European Tour card, finishing 19th on the Challenge Tour rankings. However, he came 10th in European Tour Qualifying School to earn a 2014 European Tour category.

Manley hit the headlines in 2013 when, during the third round of the World Cup of Golf in Melbourne, he hit a hole-in-one followed by an 11 at the next hole. Manley had originally believed the hole-in-one had won him a Mercedes-Benz car, only to find out afterwards that the prize only applied to the final round of the tournament. He attributed the following score of 11 to his shock and disappointment at not winning the car, but still eventually ended with an even-par round of 72.

In February 2017 Manley finished runner-up in the Joburg Open, one of the Open Qualifying Series events. This finish gave him an entry to the 2017 Open Championship, his first major championship. The runner-up finish matched his previous best in a European Tour event, the 2013 Hong Kong Open, where he lost in a playoff. Despite his early season success, Manley had a poor season and failed to retain his card, returning to the Challenge Tour for 2018.

Manley showed some good form in 2018. In May he was third in the Andalucía Costa del Sol Match Play 9 after losing 3&2 to Grant Forrest in the semi-final. In June he was involved in two playoffs in two weeks, losing in the KPMG Trophy to Pedro Figueiredo after Figueiredo made a birdie at the first extra hole and then winning the Hauts de France Golf Open at the third extra hole when Grant Forrest made a bogey. He was also runner-up in the Northern Ireland Open and finished the season 9th in the Order of Merit to earn a place on the 2019 European Tour.

== Professional wins (7) ==
=== Challenge Tour wins (4) ===
No.	Date	Tournament	Winning score	Margin of victory	Runner(s)-up
1	4 Aug 2013	Finnish Challenge	−21 (65-69-64-69=267)	2 strokes	(Portugal) José-Filipe Lima
2	17 Jun 2018	Hauts de France Golf Open	−6 (68-69-73-68=278)	Playoff	(Scotland) Grant Forrest
3	18 Jul 2021	Euram Bank Open	−18 (67-65-65-65=262)	1 stroke	(Scotland) Ewen Ferguson
4	25 Jun 2023	Blot Open de Bretagne	−9 (68-62-71-70=271)	2 strokes	(Spain) Manuel Elvira, (England) Lee Slattery

Challenge Tour playoff record (1–1)

No.	Year	Tournament	Opponent(s)	Result
1	2018	KPMG Trophy	(Portugal) Pedro Figueiredo, (Sweden) Anton Karlsson	Figueiredo won with birdie on first extra hole
2	2018	Hauts de France Golf Open	(Scotland) Grant Forrest	Won with par on third extra hole

=== PGA EuroPro Tour wins (1) ===
No.	Date	Tournament	Winning score	Margin of victory	Runners-up
1	3 Aug 2012	Eagle Orchid Scottish Masters	−7 (72-66-68=206)	1 stroke	(Wales) Oliver Farr, (Republic of Ireland) Michael McGeady

=== Jamega Pro Golf Tour wins (1) ===
No.	Date	Tournament	Winning score	Margin of victory	Runner-up
1	26 Mar 2013	Burnham & Berrow	−3 (69-70=139)	3 strokes	(England) Simon Lilly

=== Other wins (1) ===
No.	Date	Tournament	Winning score	Margin of victory	Runners-up
1	26 Sep 2012	Welsh National PGA Championship	−5 (64-71=135)	3 strokes	(Wales) Andrew Barnett, (Wales) Richard Dinsdale

== Playoff record ==
European Tour playoff record (0–1)

No.	Year	Tournament	Opponents	Result
1	2013	Hong Kong Open	(Spain) Miguel Ángel Jiménez, (Thailand) Prom Meesawat	Jiménez won with birdie on first extra hole

== Results in major championships ==
Tournament	2017
The Open Championship	CUT

CUT = missed the halfway cut
Note: Manley only played in The Open Championship.

== Team appearances ==
Amateur

- European Youths' Team Championship (representing Wales): 2000
- Palmer Cup (representing Great Britain & Ireland): 2002
- European Amateur Team Championship (representing Wales): 2003
- Walker Cup (representing Great Britain & Ireland): 2003 (winners)

Professional

- World Cup (representing Wales): 2013, 2016, 2018

== See also ==
- 2007 Challenge Tour graduates
- 2008 European Tour Qualifying School graduates
- 2010 European Tour Qualifying School graduates
- 2013 European Tour Qualifying School graduates
- 2015 European Tour Qualifying School graduates
- 2016 European Tour Qualifying School graduates
- 2018 Challenge Tour graduates
- 2023 Challenge Tour graduates
- List of golfers with most Challenge Tour wins
