= 2003 European Amateur Team Championship =

Golf competition

Tournament information
- Dates: 1–5 July 2003
- Location: The Hague, Netherlands; 52°07′52″N 04°21′43″E
- Course: Royal The Hague Golf & Country Club
- Organized by: European Golf Association
- Format: Qualification round: 36 holes stroke play Knock-out match-play

Statistics
- Par: 72
- Length: 6,686 yards (6,114 m)
- Field: 20 teams 120 players

Champion
- Spain; Alejandro Cañizares, Gonzalo Fernández-Castaño, Sebastián García Grout, Alfredo García-Heredia, Pablo Martín, Álvaro Quirós
- Qualification round: 716 (−4); Final match: 5–2

Location map
- Location in Europe Location in Netherlands

The 2005 European Amateur Team Championship took place 1–5 July at Royal The Hague Golf & Country Club in Wassenaar, Netherlands. It was the 23rd men's golf European Amateur Team Championship.

== Venue ==
The course at Royal The Hague Golf & Country Club, situated in an undulating dune landscape in Wassenaar, 10 kilometres north of the city center of The Hague, was designed in 1938, by Harry Colt and C.H. Alison.

The championship course was set up with par 72.

== Format ==
Each team consisted of 6 players, playing two rounds of stroke-play over two days, counting the five best scores each day for each team.

The eight best teams formed flight A, in knock-out match-play over the next three days. The teams were seeded based on their positions after the stroke play. The first placed team were drawn to play the quarter final against the eight placed team, the second against the seventh, the third against the sixth and the fourth against the fifth. Teams were allowed to use six players during the team matches, selecting four of them in the two morning foursome games and five players in to the afternoon single games. Games all square at the 18th hole were declared halved, if the team match was already decided.

The eight teams placed 9–16 in the qualification stroke-play formed flight B, to play similar knock-out play, with one foursome game and four single games in each match, to decide their final positions.

The four teams placed 17–20 formed flight C, to play each other in a round-robin system, with one foursome game and four single games in each match, to decide their final positions.

== Teams ==
20 nation teams contested the event, three teams lesser than at the previous event two years earlier. Each team consisted of six players.

Players in the teams

Country	Players
Austria	Leo Astl, Norbert Kirchner, Jurgen Maurer, Michael Moser, Florian Praegant, Imre Vasvary
Belgium	Gérald Gresse, Patrick Hanauer, Jonathan Horsman, Pierre Thomas, Pierre Relecom, Sebastien Wulf
Czech Republic	Alan Babický, David Kaplan, Petr Nemecek, Petr Nic, Roman Svoboda, Petr Skopový
Denmark	Mark Haastrup, Anders Schmidt Hansen, Jeppe Huldahl, Michael Jürgensen, Dennis Kristiansen, Martin Larsson
England	Richard Finch. Ross Fisher, Jon Lupton, Richard Walker, Oliver Wilson, Gary Wolstenholme
Finland	Keijo Jaakola, Roope Kakko, Ville Karhu, Heikki Mantyla, Ari Savolainen, Erik Stenman
France	Nicolas Allain, Eric Chadouet, Bertrand Coathalem, Julien Duclos-Grenet, Jean-Baptiste Gonnet, Adrien Mörk
Germany	Martin Kaymer, Markus Maichel, Benjamin Miarka, Patrick Niederdrenk, Christian Schunck, Richard Treis
Iceland	Heidar Bragason, Örn Ævar Hjartarson, Haraldur Heimisson, Magnus Larusson, Sigurdall Sveinsson, Sigmundur Masson
Ireland	Noel Fox, Justin Kehoe, Gareth Maybin, Brian McElhinney, Michael McGeady, Colm Moriarty
Italy	Alessio Bruschi, Edoardo Molinari, Francesco Molinari, Gregory Molteni, Michele Rossi, Andrea Signor
Netherlands	Wil Besseling, Jan Willem van Hoof, Rick Huiskamp, Edward de Jong, Robin Swane, Inder van Weerelt
Norway	Lars Brovold, Johann Gudjonsson, Eirik-Tage Johansen, Torstein Nevestad, Ole-Kristian Olsen, Nicolay Syvertsen
Portugal	Nuno Campino, Nuna Cunha, Tiago Cruz, Antonio Rosado, Hugo Santos, Ricardo Santos
Scotland	Jack Doherty, Graham Gordon, David Inglis, Andrew McArthur, Craig Watson, Stuart Wilson
Slovenia	Gaber Burnik, Ales Gregoric, Uros Gregoric, Matjaz Gojcic, Grega Perne, Miha Studen
Spain	Alejandro Cañizares, Gonzalo Fernández-Castaño, Sebastián García Grout, Alfredo García-Heredia, Pablo Martín, Álvaro Quirós
Sweden	Kalle Edberg, Steven Jeppesen, Niklas Lemke, Pär Nilsson, Alexander Norén, Wilhelm Schauman
Switzerland	Claudio Blaesi, Jann Schmid, Raphaël de Sousa, Martin Rominger, Fredrik Swanberg, Tino Weiss
Wales	Nigel Edwards, Stuart Manley, David Price, Alex Smith, Craig Smith, Gareth Wright

== Winners ==
Four-time-winners team Ireland won the opening 36-hole competition, with a 4-under-par score of 716, 11 strokes ahead of team Norway on 2nd place and host nation Netherlands another two strokes behind. Defending champions team Scotland did not make it to the quarter finals, finishing tenth. 1999 champions Italy missed the quarter finals on a tiebreaker, with the same qualifying score as England and Sweden on tied 7th place.

There was no official award for the lowest individual score, but individual leaders were Justin Kehoe, Ireland, and Torstein Nevestad, Norway, each with a 5-under-par score of 139, one stroke ahead of Alex Smith, Wales.

Team Spain won the gold medal, earning their second title in four years, beating team England in the final 5–2.

Team Sweden earned the bronze on third place, after beating France 4–3 in the bronze match.

== Results ==
Qualification round

Team standings

Place	Country	Score	To par
1	Ireland	349-367=716	−4
2	Norway	350-377=727	+7
3	Netherlands	358-371=729	+9
4	Wales	363-369=732	+12
5	Spain	360-373=733	+13
6	France	364-370=734	+14
T7	England *	773-364=737	+17
T7	Sweden *	366-371=737	+17
T7	Italy	361-376=737	+17
10	Scotland	372-371=743	+23
11	Germany	374-373=747	+27
12	Portugal	372-376=748	+28
13	Finland	373-378=751	+31
T14	Denmark *	373-380=753	+33
T14	Iceland	369-384=753	+33
T16	Slovenia *	371-387=758	+38
T16	Austria	371-387=758	+38
18	Belgium	376-388=764	+44
19	Switzerland	385-381=766	+46
20	Czech Republic	396-388=784	+64

* Note: In the event of a tie the order was determined by the best total of the two non-counting scores of the two rounds.

Individual leaders

Place	Player	Country	Score	To par
T1	Justin Kehoe	Ireland	66-73=139	−5
T1	Torstein Nevestad	Norway	67-72=139	−5
3	Alex Smith	Wales	69-71=140	−4
T4	Nuno Campino	Portugal	72-69=141	−3
T4	Jan Willem van Hoof	Netherlands	67-74=141	−3
T6	Pablo Martin Benavides	Spain	66-76=142	−2
T6	Brian McElhinney	Ireland	69-73=142	−2
T6	Oliver Wilson	England	73-69=142	−2
T9	Noel Fox	Ireland	69-74=143	−1
T9	Niklas Lemke	Sweden	72-71=143	−1
T9	Christian Schunk	Germany	70-73=143	−1

Note: There was no official award for the lowest individual score.

Flight A

Bracket

Quarter finals
England	4.5
Norway	2.5
France	4
Netherlands	3
Spain	5
Wales	2
Sweden	5
Ireland	2

Semi finals
England	4
France	3
Spain	4
Sweden	3

Final
Spain	5
England	2
Bronze match
Sweden	5
France	2

Elimination matches
Netherlands	4.5
Norway	2.5
Ireland	5
Wales	2

Match for 5th place
Netherlands	4
Ireland	3
Match for 7th place
Wales	4
Norway	3

Final games

Spain	England
5	2
P. Martin / A. Canizares	G. Wolstenholme / O. Wilson 2 & 1
G. Fernandez Castano / A. Garcia Heredia 21st hole	R. Finch / J. Lupton
Sebastian Garcia Grout 4 & 3	Gary Wolstenholme
Pablo Martin	Oliver Wilson 3 & 2
Alejandro Canizarez 3 & 2	Richard Walker
Alfredo Garcia Heredia 5 & 4	Richard Finch
Gonzalo Fernandez Castano 3 & 2	Ross Fisher

Flight B

Bracket

Round 1
Scotland	3.5
Iceland	1.5
Germany	3
Denmark	2
Finland	3.5
Portugal	1.5
Italy	3.5
Slovenia	1.5

Round 2
Scotland	3.5
Germany	1.5
Finland	3
Italy	2

Match for 9th place
Scotland	5
Finland	0
Match for 11th place
Italy	3
Germany	2

Elimination matches
Iceland	3
Denmark	2
Portugal	3
Slovenia	2

Match for 13th place
Iceland	3
Portugal	2
Match for 15th place
Denmark	3
Slovenia	2

Flight C

First round

Austria	Czech Republic
4	1

Belgium	Switzerland
4	1

Second round

Belgium	Czech Republic
4	1

Switzerland	Austria
3	2

Third round

Switzerland	Czech Republic
4	1

Belgium	Austria
3	2

Final standings

Place	Country
1st place, gold medalist(s)	Spain
2nd place, silver medalist(s)	England
3rd place, bronze medalist(s)	Sweden
4	France
5	Netherlands
6	Ireland
7	Wales
8	Norway
9	Scotland
10	Finland
11	Italy
12	Germany
13	Iceland
14	Portugal
15	Denmark
16	Slovenia
17	Belgium
18	Switzerland
19	Austria
20	Czech Republic

== See also ==
- European Golf Association – Organizer of European amateur golf championships
- Eisenhower Trophy – biennial world amateur team golf championship for men organized by the International Golf Federation.
- European Ladies' Team Championship – European amateur team golf championship for women organised by the European Golf Association.
