= 2007 Challenge Tour graduates =

This is a list of players who graduated from the Challenge Tour in 2007. The top 20 players on the Challenge Tour's money list in 2007 earned their European Tour card for 2008.

	2007 Challenge Tour		2008 European Tour				
Player	Money list rank	Earnings (€)	Starts	Cuts made	Best finish	Money list rank	Earnings (€)
(France) Mike Lorenzo-Vera*	1	128,927	24	12	T2	108	269,091
(England) Ross McGowan*	2	126,645	28	17	5	70	429,173
(Chile) Felipe Aguilar	3	120,409	23	16	Win	41	676,182
(Wales) Jamie Donaldson	4	111,748	27	18	T8	89	350,286
(Sweden) Leif Westerberg	5	102,323	25	3	T29	237	26,855
(Netherlands) Joost Luiten*	6	99,406	14	8	4	124	171,279
(Sweden) Magnus A. Carlsson*	7	95,670	28	15	T2	79	405,998
(England) Robert Dinwiddie*	8	91,257	30	16	T3	72	426,811
(Sweden) Mikael Lundberg	9	87,916	25	15	Win	63	476,930
(Wales) Stuart Manley	10	84,395	33	13	T14	150	131,902
(Paraguay) Fabrizio Zanotti*	11	73,816	26	11	T12	153	127,703
(England) Peter Baker	12	72,874	25	15	T9	132	159,093
(Scotland) Peter Whiteford*	13	72,730	29	16	T8	145	136,357
(England) Iain Pyman	14	70,725	27	8	T3	137	146,872
(Argentina) Julio Zapata*	15	70,158	25	10	T11	158	107,002
(Italy) Edoardo Molinari*	16	65,300	25	12	15	147	135,270
(Spain) Álvaro Velasco*	17	59,786	27	13	T5	100	286,888
(Australia) Peter Fowler	18	59,712	25	9	T3	128	165,178
(France) François Delamontagne	19	59,232	26	17	T4	118	223,746
(Norway) Jan-Are Larsen	20	56,244	17	10	4	146	135,589

* European Tour rookie in 2008
T = Tied
The player retained his European Tour card for 2009 (finished inside the top 118).
The player did not retain his European Tour Tour card for 2009, but retained conditional status (finished between 119 and 151).
The player did not retain his European Tour card for 2009 (finished outside the top 151).

The players ranked 16th through 20th were placed below the Qualifying School graduates on the exemption list, and thus could improve their status by competing in Qualifying School. François Delamontagne and Jan-Are Larsen improved their status in this way.

== Winners on the European Tour in 2008 ==
No.	Date	Player	Tournament	Winning score	Margin of victory	Runner-up
1	17 Feb	(Chile) Felipe Aguilar	Enjoy Jakarta Astro Indonesia Open	−18 (65-62-67-68=262)	1 stroke	(India) Jeev Milkha Singh
2	27 Jul	(Sweden) Mikael Lundberg	Inteco Russian Open Golf Championship	−21 (67-64-68-68=267)	2 strokes	(Spain) José Manuel Lara

== Runners-up on the European Tour in 2008 ==
No.	Date	Player	Tournament	Winner	Winning score	Runner-up score
1	13 Jan	(Sweden) Magnus A. Carlsson lost in three-man playoff	Joburg Open	(South Africa) Richard Sterne	−13 (71-68-67-65=271)	−13 (70-66-69-66=271)
2	20 Apr	(France) Mike Lorenzo-Vera	Volvo China Open	(Republic of Ireland) Damien McGrane	−10 (68-69-68-73=278)	−1 (67-69-72-79=287)
3	18 May	(Chile) Felipe Aguilar	Irish Open	(England) Richard Finch	−10 (71-72-65-70=278)	−8 (71-72-67-70=280)

== See also ==
- 2007 European Tour Qualifying School graduates
