= Jan-Are Larsen =

Norwegian golfer (born 1976)

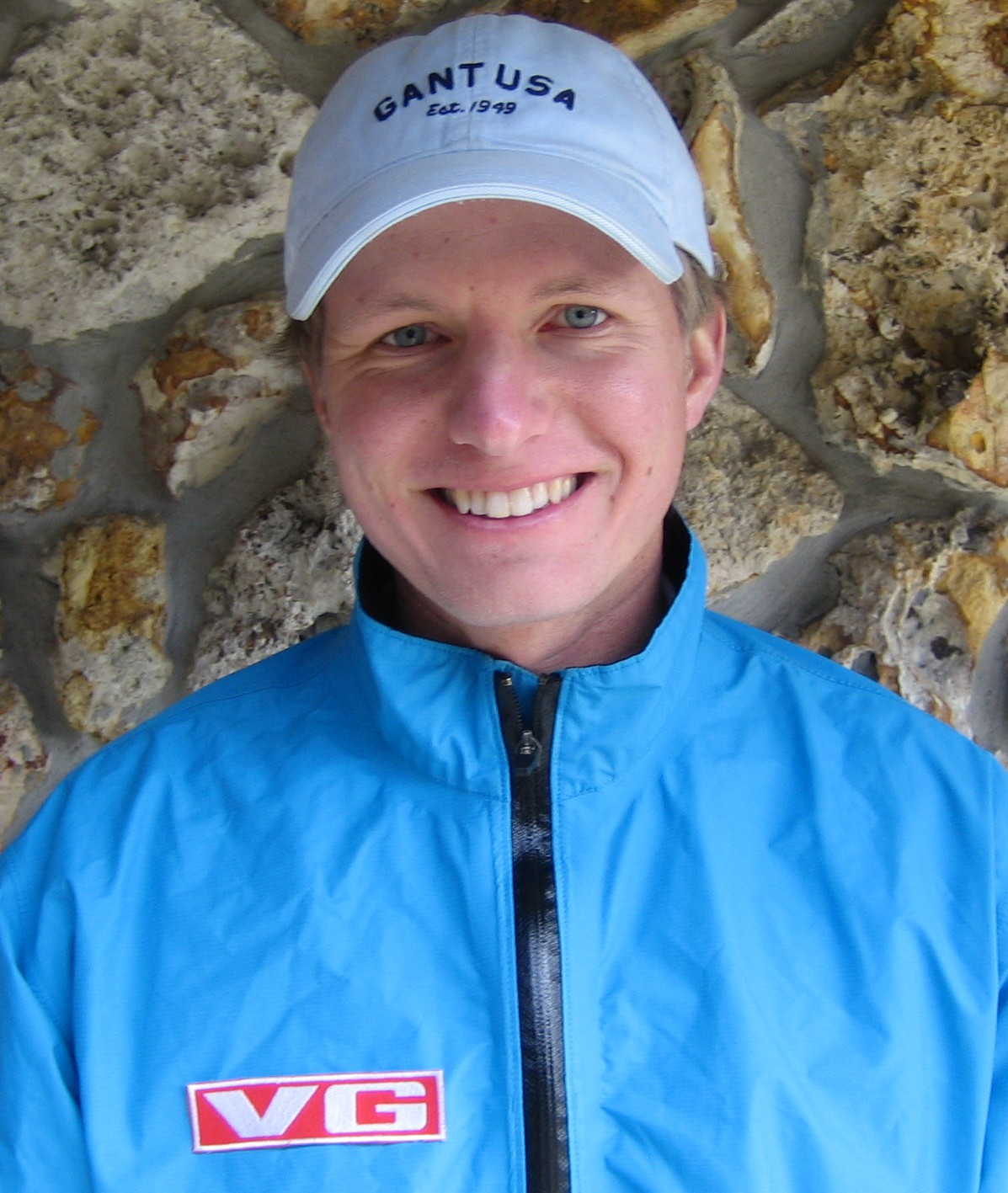

Personal information
- Nationality: Norway
- Born: 18 May 1976 (age 50) Sarpsborg, Norway
- Height: 5 ft 11 in (1.80 m)
- Weight: 172 lb (78 kg; 12.3 st)
- Spouse: Julie (m. 2004)
- Children: 2

Career
- Sport: Golf
- College: University of Alabama
- Turned professional: 2002
- Former tours: European Tour; Challenge Tour; Nordic Golf League
- Professional wins: 2

Jan-Are Larsen (born 18 May 1976) is a Norwegian professional golfer.

== Career ==
Having shown promise as an amateur golfer, Larsen earned a scholarship to play on the golf team at the University of Alabama. Upon graduating in 2002, he entered qualifying school for the European Tour as an amateur, and was successful in claiming the fifth card for the full tour. However, his debut professional season was a struggle, making only seven cuts and failing to retain his card. Since then, Larsen has progressed to the European Tour twice more via qualifying school, but has mostly played on the second-tier Challenge Tour, where he has recorded two runner-up finishes. His best season on the European Tour has been 2008, when he finished 146th in the Order of Merit.

Larsen also has two professional wins on the Scandinavian Nordic League circuit.

== Professional wins (2) ==
=== Nordic Golf League wins (2) ===
No.	Date	Tournament	Winning score	Margin of Victory	Runner-up
1	7 May 2006	DnB NOR Open	−4 (74-65-73=212)	Playoff	(Norway) Peter Kaensche
2	13 Mar 2010	La Manga Masters II	−11 (67-67-68=202)	Playoff	(Sweden) Krister Eriksson

== Team appearances ==
Amateur

- Eisenhower Trophy (representing Norway): 2000, 2002

== See also ==
- 2007 Challenge Tour graduates
- 2007 European Tour Qualifying School graduates
