= 2019 PGA EuroPro Tour =

Golf tour season

2019 PGA EuroPro Tour season
- Duration: 22 May 2019 – 1 November 2019
- Number of official events: 16
- Most wins: (England) Todd Clements (2) (Sweden) Mikael Lundberg (2)
- Order of Merit: (Sweden) Mikael Lundberg

The 2019 PGA EuroPro Tour, titled as the 2019 Golfcatcher PGA EuroPro Tour for sponsorship reasons, was the 18th season of the PGA EuroPro Tour, a third-tier tour recognised by the European Tour.

== Golfcatcher title sponsorship ==
In June, it was announced that the tour had signed a title sponsorship agreement with Golfcatcher, being renamed as the Golfcatcher PGA EuroPro Tour.

== Schedule ==
The following table lists official events during the 2019 season.

Date	Tournament	Location	Purse (£)	Winner (Note: The number in brackets after each winner's name is the number of PGA EuroPro Tour events they had won up to and including that tournament. It is rare for someone to accumulate many wins on the PGA EuroPro Tour as success at this level usually leads to promotion to the Challenge Tour.)	OWGR points
24 May	IFX Payments Championship	Hertfordshire	49,460	(England) Todd Clements (1)	4
31 May	Matchroom Sport Championship	Buckinghamshire	47,030	(England) David Dixon (1)	4
7 Jun	World Snooker Championship	Berkshire	47,030	(Sweden) Mikael Lundberg (1)	4
21 Jun	Diamond X Open	Wiltshire	50,635	(England) Luke Joy (1)	4
28 Jun	Golfcatcher Championship	Dorset	47,885	(England) Alfie Plant (1)	4
5 Jul	Motocaddy Masters	Northumberland	47,885	(England) Andrew Wilson (1)	4
12 Jul	Cobra Puma Championship	Cheshire	49,945	(England) Richard Mansell (1)	4
19 Jul	Eagle Orchid Scottish Masters	Inverness-shire	49,210	(Scotland) Daniel Young (1)	4
26 Jul	Penta Hotels Championship	Berkshire	48,955	(England) Sean Towndrow (1)	4
10 Aug	Nokia Masters	West Sussex	49,210	(Scotland) James Ross (1)	4
15 Aug	HotelPlanner.com Championship	Oxfordshire	47,320	(England) Bradley Moore (1)	4
23 Aug	Macdonald Hill Valley Hotel, Golf & Spa	Shropshire	46,735	(England) Todd Clements (2)	4
30 Aug	Prem Group Irish Masters	Ireland	48,160	(England) Marco Penge (1)	4
6 Sep	PDC Championship	Oxfordshire	46,735	(England) Billy Hemstock (6)	4
20 Sep	Newmachar Golf Club Challenge	Aberdeenshire	47,030	(Scotland) Jack McDonald (1)	4
1 Nov	Tour Championships	Spain	98,500	(Sweden) Mikael Lundberg (2)	4

== Order of Merit ==
The Order of Merit was based on prize money won during the season, calculated in Pound sterling. The top five players on the Order of Merit (not otherwise exempt) earned status to play on the 2020 Challenge Tour.

Position	Player	Prize money (£)	Status earned
1	(Sweden) Mikael Lundberg	37,455	Promoted to Challenge Tour
2	(England) Richard Mansell	28,260	Finished in Top 70 of Challenge Tour Rankings
3	(England) Marco Penge	25,075	Promoted to Challenge Tour
4	(England) Alfie Plant	23,116	Promoted to Challenge Tour
5	(England) Todd Clements	21,400	Finished in Top 70 of Challenge Tour Rankings
6	(England) Andrew Wilson	21,180	Promoted to Challenge Tour
7	(Northern Ireland) Jonathan Caldwell	21,061	Qualified for European Tour (Top 25 in Q School)
8	(England) Bradley Moore	20,855	Promoted to Challenge Tour
9	(Scotland) Daniel Young	20,462	Qualified for Challenge Tour (made cut in Q School)
10	(England) James Allan	19,571	
