= 2005 PGA EuroPro Tour =

Golf tour season

2005 PGA EuroPro Tour season
- Duration: 27 April 2005 – 26 November 2005
- Number of official events: 19
- Most wins: (England) Simon Robinson (3)
- Order of Merit: (England) Mark Smith

The 2005 PGA EuroPro Tour was the fourth season of the PGA EuroPro Tour, a third-tier tour recognised by the European Tour.

== Schedule ==
The following table lists official events during the 2005 season.

Date	Tournament	Location	Purse (£)	Winner (Note: The number in brackets after each winner's name is the number of PGA EuroPro Tour events they had won up to and including that tournament. It is rare for someone to accumulate many wins on the PGA EuroPro Tour as success at this level usually leads to promotion to the Challenge Tour.)
29 Apr	Partypoker.com Classic	Norfolk	45,000	(England) Andrew Marshall (1)
13 May	Kronenbourg Classic	East Lothian	40,000	(Australia) John Wade (2)
20 May	Upplands Classic	Bristol	40,000	(Australia) John Wade (3)
27 May	Pokermillion.com Championship	Northamptonshire	40,000	(England) Rob McGuirk (1)
11 Jun	Sky Sports International	Hertfordshire	40,000	(England) Michael Welch (1)
17 Jun	Swallow Challenge	Surrey	40,000	(England) Phil Worthington (1)
25 Jun	Doncaster Open	South Yorkshire	40,000	(Scotland) Lee Rhind (1)
30 Jun	Stoke by Nayland Club International Open	Essex	40,000	(England) Paul Curry (1)
7 Jul	Marriott Sprowston Manor Open	Norfolk	40,000	(England) David Fisher (1)
22 Jul	Swallow Suffolk Open	Suffolk	40,000	(England) Simon Robinson (1)
29 Jul	Oakley International Open	Derbyshire	40,000	(England) Simon Robinson (2)
5 Aug	Peugeot International	West Yorkshire	40,000	(Australia) Daniel Gaunt (1)
19 Aug	China Fleet International Open	Cornwall	40,000	(England) Andrew Willey (1)
27 Aug	Pokermillion.com Classic	Greater London	40,000	(Wales) Richard Johnson (1)
2 Sep	Golf Pages Classic	Cheshire	40,000	(England) Simon Robinson (3)
9 Sep	Barclays European Masters	Portugal	€100,000	(Portugal) Antonio Sobrinho (2)
17 Sep	Whittlebury Park International Open	Northamptonshire	40,000	(England) Mark Smith (2)
30 Sep	Ufford Park Classic	Suffolk	40,000	(England) Rob McGuirk (2)
26 Nov	Oceânico Tour Championship	Portugal	75,000	(England) Mark Smith (3)

== Order of Merit ==
The Order of Merit was based on prize money won during the season, calculated in Pound sterling. The top five players on the Order of Merit earned status to play on the 2006 Challenge Tour.

Position	Player	Prize money (£)	Status earned
1	(England) Mark Smith	54,878	Promoted to Challenge Tour
2	(Australia) Daniel Gaunt	38,093	Promoted to Challenge Tour
3	(England) Simon Robinson	36,595	Promoted to Challenge Tour
4	(Australia) John Wade	30,695	Promoted to Challenge Tour
5	(England) Rob McGuirk	30,610	Promoted to Challenge Tour
6	(England) Graeme Clark	23,112	
7	(England) Phil Worthington	22,328	
8	(England) Andrew Willey	20,645	
9	(Netherlands) Inder van Weerelt	19,831	Qualified for Challenge Tour (made cut in Q School)
10	(Scotland) Lee Rhind	18,993	
