= Pablo Martín (golfer) =

Spanish professional golfer

Personal information
- Full name: Pablo Martín Benavides
- Nationality: Spain
- Born: 20 April 1986 (age 40) Málaga, Spain
- Height: 1.80 m (5 ft 11 in)

Career
- Sport: Golf
- College: Oklahoma State University
- Turned professional: 2007
- Current tours: Sunshine Tour; European Tour
- Professional wins: 3

Number of wins by tour
- European Tour: 3
- Sunshine Tour: 2

Best results in major championships
- Masters Tournament: DNP
- PGA Championship: DNP
- U.S. Open: T30: 2007
- The Open Championship: DNP

Achievements and awards
- Haskins Award: 2006
- Phil Mickelson Award: 2006
- Jack Nicklaus Award: 2006

Pablo Martín Benavides (born 20 April 1986) is a Spanish professional golfer.

== Early life and amateur career ==
In 1986, Martín was born in Málaga. He attended Oklahoma State University in the United States. Martín was named the Jack Nicklaus Award winner and the Haskins Award winner. Martin also won the 2005 Porter Cup.

In April 2007, Martín became the first amateur ever to win a European Tour event when he captured the Estoril Open de Portugal title. As an amateur, he had to forfeit the winner's prize money of €208,330 but the win still granted him exemption on the European Tour until the end of 2009.

== Professional career ==
He turned professional in June 2007 and completed the season playing on both the European Tour and the PGA Tour, relying on sponsors' invitations for PGA Tour events.

Martín did not enjoy immediate success on the European Tour after he turned professional, with only a single top ten finish in the 2008 and 2009 seasons but managed to retain his card for the 2010 season by finishing 118th on the 2009 Race to Dubai. However in the first event of the 2010 season, the Alfred Dunhill Championship, he won again to become the first player to win on the European Tour as both an amateur and as a professional. In December 2010, he defended this title winning the 2011 Alfred Dunhill Championship.

After a poor 2012 season, Martín lost full playing rights on the European Tour and did not complete the Qualifying School.

== Awards and honors ==
In 2006, Martín won three best college golfer awards: the Jack Nicklaus Award, the Haskins Award, and the Phil Mickelson Award.

== Amateur wins ==
- 2001 Boys Amateur Championship
- 2004 Carris Trophy
- 2005 Porter Cup

== Professional wins (3) ==
=== European Tour wins (3) ===
No.	Date	Tournament	Winning score	Margin of victory	Runner(s)-up
1	1 Apr 2007	Estoril Open de Portugal (as an amateur)	−7 (73-70-66-68=277)	1 stroke	(France) Raphaël Jacquelin
2	13 Dec 2009 (2010 season)	Alfred Dunhill Championship^{1}	−17 (68-63-71-69=271)	1 stroke	(South Africa) Charl Schwartzel
3	12 Dec 2010 (2011 season)	Alfred Dunhill Championship^{1} (2)	−11 (69-70-68-70=277)	2 strokes	(South Africa) Anthony Michael, (Denmark) Thorbjørn Olesen, (South Africa) Charl Schwartzel

^{1}Co-sanctioned by the Sunshine Tour

== Results in major championships ==
Tournament	2007	2008	2009	2010
Masters Tournament				
U.S. Open	T30			T82
The Open Championship				
PGA Championship				

Did not play

"T" = tied

== Results in World Golf Championships ==
Tournament	2010	2011
Championship		
Match Play		
Invitational		
Champions	T16	75

Did not play

QF, R16, R32, R64 = Round in which player lost in match play
"T" = tied

== Team appearances ==
Amateur

- European Boys' Team Championship (representing Spain): 2002 (winners), 2003
- Jacques Léglise Trophy (representing Continental Europe): 2002, 2003
- Eisenhower Trophy (representing Spain): 2002, 2006
- European Amateur Team Championship (representing Spain): 2003 (winners), 2005
- European Youths' Team Championship (representing Spain): 2004
- Bonallack Trophy (representing Europe): 2004
- Palmer Cup (representing Europe): 2005, 2006 (winners)

Professional

- Royal Trophy (representing Europe): 2010 (winners), 2011 (winners)
