= 2011 PGA EuroPro Tour =

Golf tour season

2011 PGA EuroPro Tour season
- Duration: 3 May 2011 – 7 October 2011
- Number of official events: 13
- Most wins: (England) Chris Hanson (3)
- Order of Merit: (England) Chris Hanson

The 2011 PGA EuroPro Tour was the 10th season of the PGA EuroPro Tour, a third-tier tour recognised by the European Tour.

== Schedule ==
The following table lists official events during the 2011 season.

Date	Tournament	Location	Purse (£)	Winner (Note: The number in brackets after each winner's name is the number of PGA EuroPro Tour events they had won up to and including that tournament. It is rare for someone to accumulate many wins on the PGA EuroPro Tour as success at this level usually leads to promotion to the Challenge Tour.)
7 May	YourGolfTravel.com European Championship	Norfolk	39,185	(England) Jamie Abbott (1)
3 Jun	Kerry London PGA EuroPro Tour	Surrey	40,605	(England) Stuart Archibald (2)
17 Jun	Motocaddy Masters	Devon	39,185	(England) Chris Hanson (2)
24 Jun	Rusty's Travel Classic	Northumberland	40,110	(England) Graeme Clark (5)
1 Jul	Galgorm Castle Northern Ireland Open	County Antrim	39,935	(England) Chris Hanson (3)
8 Jul	Audi Cork Irish Masters	Ireland	40,110	(England) Paul Reed (1)
22 Jul	ABC Solutions UK Championship	Cheshire	39,570	(Scotland) Duncan Stewart (1)
28 Jul	World Snooker Association Championship	Bristol	39,935	(England) Andrew Willey (4)
5 Aug	Formby Hall Classic	Merseyside	40,760	(England) Tommy Fleetwood (1)
12 Aug	Lingfield Park Golf Championship	Surrey	39,755	(England) Luke Goddard (1)
26 Aug	Network Veka Classic	Cheshire	39,935	(England) Chris Hanson (4)
16 Sep	Integral Collection Classic	North Yorkshire	40,445	(United States) Dodge Kemmer (1)
7 Oct	888poker.com Tour Championship	Spain	51,500	(England) James Busby (2)

== Order of Merit ==
The Order of Merit was based on prize money won during the season, calculated in Pound sterling. The top five players on the Order of Merit earned status to play on the 2012 Challenge Tour.

Position	Player	Prize money (£)	Status earned
1	(England) Chris Hanson	37,930	Promoted to Challenge Tour
2	(England) James Busby	29,192	Promoted to Challenge Tour
3	(England) Graeme Clark	25,653	Promoted to Challenge Tour
4	(England) Luke Goddard	16,664	Promoted to Challenge Tour
5	(England) Jamie Abbott	15,768	Promoted to Challenge Tour
6	(Scotland) Duncan Stewart	15,406	
7	(England) Paul Reed	13,824	
8	(England) George Cowan	12,780	
9	(South Africa) Darryn Lloyd	12,498	
10	(England) Andrew Willey	12,200	
