= 2014 PGA EuroPro Tour =

Golf tour season

2014 PGA EuroPro Tour season
- Duration: 15 April 2014 – 31 October 2014
- Number of official events: 17
- Most wins: (England) William Harrold (2) (England) Jack Senior (2) (England) Peter Tarver-Jones (2)
- Order of Merit: (Scotland) Elliot Saltman

The 2014 PGA EuroPro Tour, titled as the 2014 HotelPlanner.com PGA EuroPro Tour for sponsorship reasons, was the 13th season of the PGA EuroPro Tour, a third-tier tour recognised by the European Tour.

== HotelPlanner.com title sponsorship ==
In April, it was announced that the tour had signed a title sponsorship agreement with HotelPlanner, being renamed as the HotelPlanner.com PGA EuroPro Tour.

== Schedule ==
The following table lists official events during the 2014 season.

Date	Tournament	Location	Purse (£)	Winner (Note: The number in brackets after each winner's name is the number of PGA EuroPro Tour events they had won up to and including that tournament. It is rare for someone to accumulate many wins on the PGA EuroPro Tour as success at this level usually leads to promotion to the Challenge Tour.)
17 Apr	Matchroom Championship	Warwickshire	39,185	(England) William Harrold (1)
1 May	Eagle Orchid Scottish Masters	Angus	40,435	(England) Jack Senior (1)
23 May	Dawson and Sanderson Travel Classic	Northumberland	40,760	(England) William Harrold (2)
31 May	Kerry London Championship	Surrey	39,935	(England) Jack Senior (2)
13 Jun	FSC Invitational	Shropshire	39,755	(England) Garrick Porteous (1)
20 Jun	HotelPlanner.com Championship	Wiltshire	41,820	(England) Stiggy Hodgson (1)
27 Jun	Buildbase Open	Oxfordshire	39,380	(England) James Robinson (2)
11 Jul	Motocaddy Masters	Dunbartonshire	40,760	(England) Neil Chaudhuri (1)
18 Jul	Simpson & Marwick Championship	Midlothian	41,330	(England) James Watts (1)
25 Jul	Kingspan Concra Wood Open	Ireland	39,755	(England) Steve Uzzell (1)
1 Aug	Walk in My Shoes Open	Ireland	39,185	(England) Stuart Archibald (3)
8 Aug	Clipper Logistics Championship	West Yorkshire	39,380	(England) Billy Hemstock (3)
15 Aug	Break90 Classic	Northumberland	39,185	(England) Andrew Cheese (1)
21 Aug	World Poker Tour Invitational	Kent	39,185	(England) Peter Tarver-Jones (1)
29 Aug	PDC and World Snooker Open	Oxfordshire	40,910	(England) Peter Tarver-Jones (2)
5 Sep	Glenfarclas Open	Renfrewshire	40,110	(Scotland) Craig Ross (a) (1)
31 Oct	Visit Egypt Tour Championships	Egypt	58,175	(Scotland) Elliot Saltman (3)

== Order of Merit ==
The Order of Merit was titled as the HotelPlanner.com Race to El Gouna and was based on prize money won during the season, calculated in Pound sterling. The top five players on the Order of Merit (not otherwise exempt) earned status to play on the 2015 Challenge Tour.

Position	Player	Prize money (£)	Status earned
1	(Scotland) Elliot Saltman	27,991	Promoted to Challenge Tour
2	(England) Jack Senior	25,248	Finished in Top 70 of Challenge Tour Rankings
3	(England) Peter Tarver-Jones	23,192	Promoted to Challenge Tour
4	(England) James Watts	22,107	Promoted to Challenge Tour
5	(England) Stiggy Hodgson	20,128	Promoted to Challenge Tour
6	(England) James Robinson	18,720	Promoted to Challenge Tour
7	(England) Billy Hemstock	15,697	
8	(England) Andrew Cheese	15,372	
9	(England) Stuart Archibald	15,131	
10	(Northern Ireland) Jonathan Caldwell	14,579	
