= 2007 PGA EuroPro Tour =

Golf tour season

2007 PGA EuroPro Tour season
- Duration: 1 May 2007 – 1 November 2007
- Number of official events: 15
- Most wins: (England) Graeme Clark (3)
- Order of Merit: (England) Graeme Clark

The 2007 PGA EuroPro Tour was the sixth season of the PGA EuroPro Tour, a third-tier tour recognised by the European Tour.

== Schedule ==
The following table lists official events during the 2007 season.

Date	Tournament	Location	Purse (£)	Winner (Note: The number in brackets after each winner's name is the number of PGA EuroPro Tour events they had won up to and including that tournament. It is rare for someone to accumulate many wins on the PGA EuroPro Tour as success at this level usually leads to promotion to the Challenge Tour.)
3 May	Wensum Valley International Open	Norfolk	40,000	(Republic of Ireland) Colm Moriarty (1)
11 May	Oceânico Group Irish Classic	Ireland	40,000	(Republic of Ireland) Brian McElhinney (1)
18 May	Faithlegg Championship	Ireland	45,000	(England) Graeme Clark (1)
25 May	Matchroompoker.com Scottish Masters	Peeblesshire	40,000	(England) Neil Walker (2)
1 Jun	Prime Time Championship	Northamptonshire	40,000	(England) Guy Woodman (1)
21 Jun	Bovey Castle Championship	Devon	40,000	(England) Matthew Woods (2)
28 Jun	Stoke by Nayland Championship	Suffolk	40,000	(Republic of Ireland) Michael McDermott (1)
19 Jul	Claytons Kola Tonic Championship	Bristol	40,000	(England) Graeme Clark (2)
3 Aug	Towergate Insurance Championship	Essex	40,000	(England) Lloyd Kennedy (1)
10 Aug	De Vere Oulton Hall Masters	West Yorkshire	40,000	(England) Daniel Wardrop (1)
24 Aug	Partypoker.net English Masters	Northamptonshire	40,000	(England) Graeme Clark (3)
31 Aug	Motocaddy Championship	Suffolk	40,000	(England) Dean Barnes (1)
7 Sep	Ethos Group Classic	Warwickshire	40,000	(Scotland) Elliot Saltman (1)
27 Sep	Ladbrokescasino.com Masters	Surrey	40,000	(Scotland) Lee Harper (1)
1 Nov	Partypoker.net Tour Championship	Fife	70,000	(England) Andrew Willey (3)

== Order of Merit ==
The Order of Merit was based on prize money won during the season, calculated in Pound sterling. The top five players on the Order of Merit (not otherwise exempt) earned status to play on the 2008 Challenge Tour.

Position	Player	Prize money (£)	Status earned
1	(England) Graeme Clark	43,689	Qualified for Challenge Tour (made cut in Q School)
2	(England) Andrew Willey	29,818	Promoted to Challenge Tour
3	(England) Neil Walker	22,415	Promoted to Challenge Tour
4	(Republic of Ireland) Colm Moriarty	17,930	Finished in Top 80 of Challenge Tour Rankings
5	(England) Matthew Woods	15,182	Promoted to Challenge Tour
6	(England) Daniel Wardrop	15,023	Promoted to Challenge Tour
7	(England) Matthew Cort	14,977	Qualified for Challenge Tour (made cut in Q School)
8	(England) Mark Smith	14,025	Promoted to Challenge Tour
9	(Scotland) Elliot Saltman	13,422	
10	(Republic of Ireland) Michael McDermott	12,985	
