= François Delamontagne =

French golfer

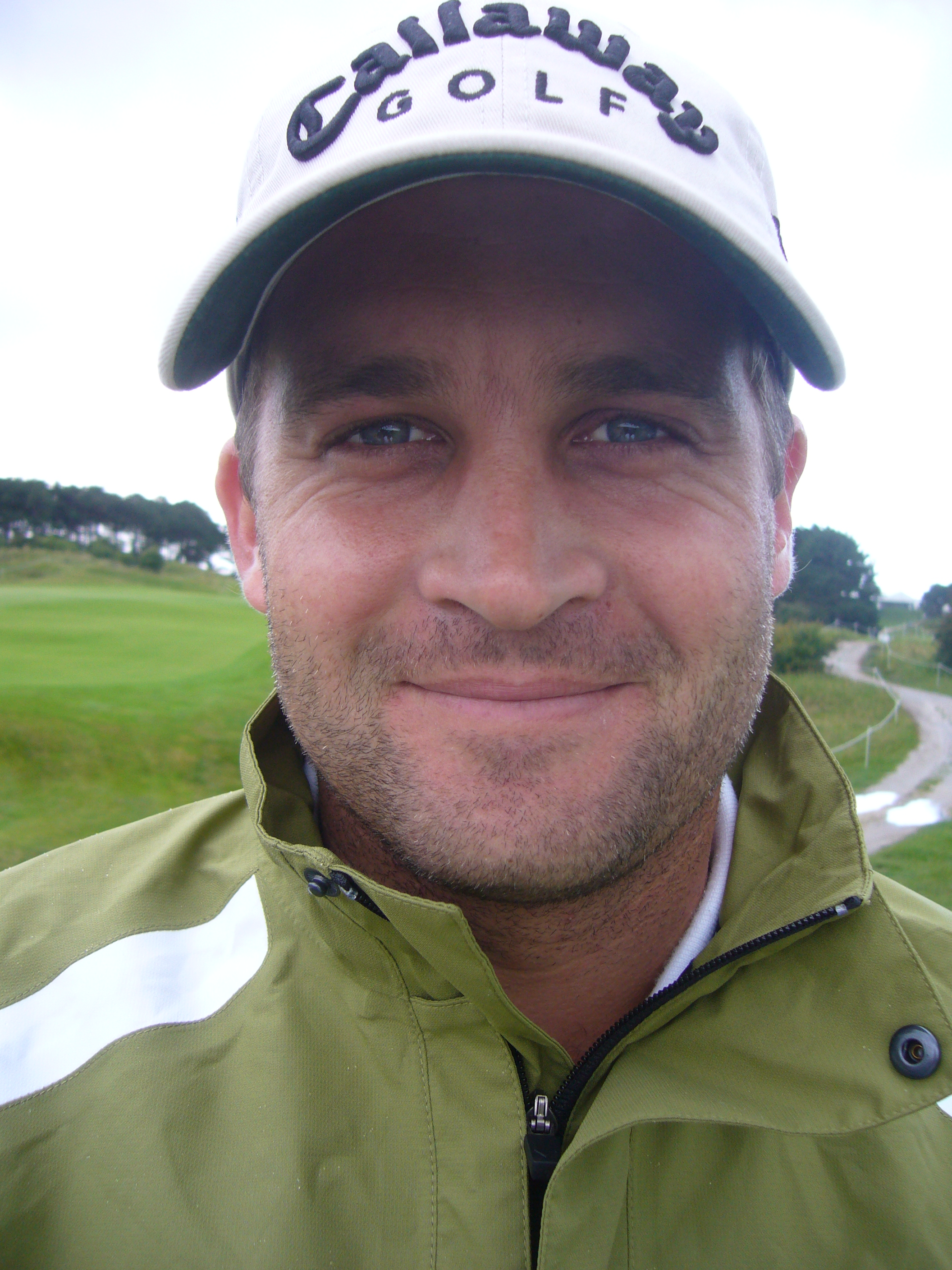

Personal information
- Full name: François Delamontagne
- Nationality: France
- Born: 25 March 1979 (age 47) Rennes, France
- Height: 1.82 m (6 ft 0 in)
- Weight: 80 kg (180 lb; 13 st)
- Children: 2

Career
- Sport: Golf
- Turned professional: 2001
- Former tours: European Tour; Challenge Tour

François Delamontagne (born 25 March 1979 in Rennes) is a French professional golfer.

== Professional career ==
Delamontagne turned professional in 2001 prior to competing in the European Tour's qualifying school. He reached the final stage, a performance which enabled him to play a full season on the second-tier Challenge Tour in 2002. Delamontagne finished 39th in the money list in his first full professional season, and returned to the qualifying school at the end of the year; this time he played well enough to earn a full European Tour card for the 2003 season.

Delamontagne struggled initially to establish himself at the highest level; he returned to the qualifying school after both the 2003 and 2004 seasons, but was successful in regaining his card both times. In 2005, he enjoyed his most successful year to date, finishing 68th in the Order of Merit thanks primarily to a tie for fourth in the French Open, his home tournament. His form subsequently slumped however, and after an unsuccessful return to the qualifying school in 2006 Delamontagne returned to the Challenge Tour in 2007. A strong finish to the 2007 season, with six top-10s in his last eight tournaments, ensured a return to the European Tour after finishing 19th on the Challenge Tour rankings, earning the penultimate qualifying spot.

Since then, Delamontagne has built a reputation as a man for tight situations: in 2008, he kept his card after finishing 118th on the Order of Merit, the last available spot; in 2009 he was 119th going into the final event of the season, the JBWere Masters, where he finished 3rd, his best ever European Tour finish, to retain his card for another year. The 2010 season was less successful, and despite another 3rd place finish at the Vivendi Cup, he once again had to return to the Qualifying School. For the fifth time in his career, it would prove a successful visit, ensuring Delamontagne another year of European Tour golf.

Suffering from the yips, notably making him let his club go on his swing, he was forced to retire at the age of 35, in 2014.

== Personal life ==
Delamontagne married his wife Maitena in 2006; they already had one daughter, Lea, and a second, Marie, followed in 2007. His father is the former French international footballer Patrick Delamontagne; François played youth football for Rennes until the age of sixteen.

== Team appearances ==
Amateur

- Eisenhower Trophy (representing France): 2000
- European Amateur Team Championship (representing France): 2001

== See also ==
- 2007 Challenge Tour graduates
- 2007 European Tour Qualifying School graduates
- 2010 European Tour Qualifying School graduates
