= 2012 PGA EuroPro Tour =

Golf tour season

2012 PGA EuroPro Tour season
- Duration: 25 April 2012 – 15 November 2012
- Number of official events: 15
- Most wins: (England) Paul Maddy (2) (Scotland) Duncan Stewart (2)
- Order of Merit: (England) Paul Maddy

The 2012 PGA EuroPro Tour, titled as the 2012 888poker.com PGA EuroPro Tour for sponsorship reasons, was the 11th season of the PGA EuroPro Tour, a third-tier tour recognised by the European Tour.

== 888poker title sponsorship ==
In February, it was announced that the tour had signed a title sponsorship agreement with 888poker, being renamed as the 888poker.com PGA EuroPro Tour.

== Schedule ==
The following table lists official events during the 2012 season.

| Date | Tournament | Location | Purse (£) | Winner (Note: The number in brackets after each winner's name is the number of PGA EuroPro Tour events they had won up to and including that tournament. It is rare for someone to accumulate many wins on the PGA EuroPro Tour as success at this level usually leads to promotion to the Challenge Tour.) |
|---|---|---|---|---|
| 27 Apr | Motocaddy Masters | Norfolk | 40,445 | (England) Dan Seymour (1) |
| 4 May | BGC British Masters | Surrey | 40,605 | (England) Martin LeMesurier (1) |
| 25 May | Your Golf Travel Classic | Devon | 39,380 | (England) Tyrrell Hatton (1) |
| 1 Jun | Ulster Bank Open | County Antrim | 39,185 | (England) Paul Reed (2) |
| 10 Jun | Kerry London PGA EuroPro Tour | Surrey | 39,185 | (England) Billy Fowles (1) |
| 22 Jun | WSL Open | Northamptonshire | 39,935 | (England) James Hepworth (2) |
| 6 Jul | Audi Cork Irish Masters | Ireland | 41,195 | (Scotland) Elliot Saltman (2) |
| 13 Jul | Kingspan Concra Wood Open | Ireland | 39,185 | (England) Billy Hemstock (1) |
| 20 Jul | Buildbase Open | Oxfordshire | 39,570 | (England) George Woolgar (1) |
| 3 Aug | Eagle Orchid Scottish Masters | Ayrshire | 39,380 | (Wales) Stuart Manley (1) |
| 10 Aug | MarHall.com Scottish Classic | Renfrewshire | 40,110 | (Scotland) Wallace Booth (1) |
| 24 Aug | Veka and Network Veka UK Open | Cheshire | 39,570 | (England) Paul Maddy (3) |
| 1 Sep | Sweetspot Classic | Northumberland | 40,280 | (Scotland) Duncan Stewart (2) |
| 14 Sep | Sweetspot Masters | North Yorkshire | 39,185 | (Scotland) Duncan Stewart (3) |
| 15 Nov | 888poker.com Tour Championship | Buckinghamshire | 60,000 | (England) Paul Maddy (4) |

== Order of Merit ==
The Order of Merit was titled as the 888poker.com Order of Merit and was based on prize money won during the season, calculated in Pound sterling. The top five players on the Order of Merit earned status to play on the 2013 Challenge Tour.

| Position | Player | Prize money (£) | Status earned |
|---|---|---|---|
| 1 | (England) Paul Maddy | 32,822 | Promoted to Challenge Tour |
| 2 | (Scotland) Duncan Stewart | 30,051 | Promoted to Challenge Tour |
| 3 | (Wales) Stuart Manley | 28,731 | Promoted to Challenge Tour |
| 4 | (England) James Hepworth | 19,278 | Promoted to Challenge Tour |
| 5 | (Scotland) Wallace Booth | 17,789 | Promoted to Challenge Tour |
| 6 | (Scotland) Elliot Saltman | 17,717 | |
| 7 | (England) Paul Reed | 17,471 | |
| 8 | (England) Martin LeMesurier | 16,492 | |
| 9 | (England) George Woolgar | 15,304 | |
| 10 | (England) Billy Fowles | 15,246 | |
