= 2007 European Tour Qualifying School graduates =

This is a list of the 30 players who earned their 2008 European Tour card through Q School in 2007.

Place	Player	European Tour starts	Cuts made	Notes
1	(Austria) Martin Wiegele	34	8	1 Challenge Tour win
T2	(Spain) Pedro Linhart	161	85	1 European Tour win, 1 Challenge Tour win
T2	(England) Lee Slattery	81	39	1 Challenge Tour win
T4	(Austria) Florian Praegant	3	0	Recovered from sustaining a broken neck in 2006
T4	(Spain) Luis Claverie	34	14	
T6	(France) François Delamontagne	113	54	19th in the Challenge Tour rankings
T6	(England) Lee S. James	74	25	4 Challenge Tour wins; won 1994 Amateur Championship and played in 1995 Walker Cup
T6	(Scotland) Alan McLean	64	24	2 Sunshine Tour wins
T6	(Wales) Sion Bebb	54	25	1 Challenge Tour win
T6	(Spain) Pablo Larrazábal	1	0	
T11	(England) Richard Bland	154	70	1 Challenge Tour win
T11	(Iceland) Birgir Hafþórsson	31	15	
T11	(Sweden) Joakim Bäckström	83	43	1 European Tour win
T11	(Germany) Sven Strüver	403	236	3 European Tour wins
T11	(Italy) Paolo Terreni	8	2	
T16	(France) Benoît Teilleria	112	51	
T16	(Argentina) Juan Abbate	10	1	
T16	(Scotland) David Drysdale	130	63	2 Challenge Tour wins
T16	(England) David Dixon	91	41	Won 2000 Lytham Trophy
T16	(Australia) Matthew Millar	55	31	
T16	(Scotland) Craig Lee	8	1	
T22	(Sweden) Patrik Sjöland	279	164	2 European Tour wins, 1 Challenge Tour win
T22	(Germany) Marcel Siem	148	87	1 European Tour win
T22	(South Africa) James Kamte	10	5	1 Sunshine Tour win; first black South African on Tour for 31 years
T22	(New Zealand) Gareth Paddison	37	14	1 Challenge Tour win, 2 PGA Tour of Australasia wins
T22	(England) Philip Golding	309	135	1 European Tour win, 3 Challenge Tour wins
T22	(England) Paul Waring	1	0	
T22	(Norway) Jan-Are Larsen	46	19	20th in the Challenge Tour rankings
T22	(South Africa) Ulrich van den Berg	22	8	5 Sunshine Tour wins
T22	(South Africa) Thomas Aiken	18	6	6 Sunshine Tour wins

2008 European Tour rookie

== 2008 Results ==
Player	Starts	Cuts made	Best finish	Money list rank	Earnings (€)
(Austria) Martin Wiegele	25	13	9	142	138,672
(Spain) Pedro Linhart	20	9	T37	196	49,535
(England) Lee Slattery	27	14	T2	107	275,242
(Austria) Florian Praegant*	20	5	T55	249	23,918
(Spain) Luis Claverie	23	7	T30	197	48,046
(France) François Delamontagne	26	17	T4	118	223,746
(England) Lee S. James	22	6	T16	176	74,377
(Scotland) Alan McLean	10	6	T21	253	22,531
(Wales) Sion Bebb	24	11	8	140	138,898
(Spain) Pablo Larrazábal*	28	17	Win	18	960,858
(England) Richard Bland	17	9	T4	167	88,363
(Iceland) Birgir Hafþórsson	8	3	T50	284	9,288
(Sweden) Joakim Bäckström	21	9	T16	192	55,051
(Germany) Sven Strüver	25	8	4	163	96,248
(Italy) Paolo Terreni*	20	2	T67	324	4,062
(France) Benoît Teilleria	19	7	T22	216	37,762
(Argentina) Juan Abbate*	21	8	T7	166	90,633
(Scotland) David Drysdale	23	8	5	151	131,473
(England) David Dixon	24	10	Win	114	240,032
(Australia) Matthew Millar	20	14	T4	135	151,176
(Scotland) Craig Lee*	20	6	T17	186	60,766
(Sweden) Patrik Sjöland	26	14	T4	119	223,413
(Germany) Marcel Siem	28	14	T4	96	309,839
(South Africa) James Kamte*	23	9	T3	138	142,062
(New Zealand) Gareth Paddison*	25	12	T12	149	132,294
(England) Philip Golding	19	4	T13	234	27,584
(England) Paul Waring*	22	15	6	105	279,872
(Norway) Jan-Are Larsen	17	10	4	146	135,589
(South Africa) Ulrich van den Berg*	9	5	T20	206	41,409
(South Africa) Thomas Aiken*	24	13	T13	131	160,775

* European Tour rookie in 2008
T = Tied
The player retained his European Tour card for 2009 (finished inside the top 118).
The player did not retain his European Tour Tour card for 2009, but retained conditional status (finished between 119 and 151).
The player did not retain his European Tour card for 2009 (finished outside the top 151).

== Winners on the European Tour in 2008 ==
No.	Date	Player	Tournament	Winning score	Margin of victory	Runner-up
1	15 Jun	(England) David Dixon	Saint-Omer Open	−5 (77-67-69-66=279)	1 stroke	(Sweden) Christian Nilsson
2	29 Jun	(Spain) Pablo Larrazábal	Open de France Alstom	−15 (65-70-67-67=269)	4 strokes	(Scotland) Colin Montgomerie

== Runners-up on the European Tour in 2008 ==
No.	Date	Player	Tournament	Winner	Winning score	Runner-up score
1	9 Dec 2007	(England) Lee Slattery	Alfred Dunhill Championship	(England) John Bickerton	−13 (70-69-68-68=275)	−12 (73-65-67-71=276)

== See also ==
- 2007 Challenge Tour graduates
- 2008 European Tour
