= Chris Hanson (golfer) =

English golfer (born 1985)

Personal information
- Full name: Christopher Hanson
- Nationality: England
- Born: 5 August 1985 (age 41) Harrogate, England
- Height: 1.85 m (6 ft 1 in)
- Weight: 83 kg (183 lb; 13.1 st)

Career
- Sport: Golf
- Turned professional: 2006
- Current tour: European Tour
- Former tours: Challenge Tour; PGA EuroPro Tour
- Professional wins: 5

Best results in major championships
- Masters Tournament: DNP
- PGA Championship: DNP
- U.S. Open: DNP
- The Open Championship: CUT: 2014

Achievements and awards
- PGA EuroPro Tour Order of Merit winner: 2011

Christopher Hanson (born 5 August 1985) is an English professional golfer currently playing on the European Tour.

== Satellite tour career ==
In 2011, Hanson won three times on the PGA EuroPro Tour and topped the Order of Merit (season money leader). This top five finish earned him a spot on the Challenge Tour.

== 2014 season ==
Hanson qualified for the 2014 Open Championship, but missed the cut.

== 2015 season ==
At 2015 European Tour qualifying school, Hanson was the last player to earn his 2016 Tour card.

== 2016 season ==
In the 2016 season, he has played on the European Tour where he was the third day leader at the Trophée Hassan II.

In 2016, Hanson also played on the Challenge Tour where he finished tied for fourth at the Challenge de Madrid.

== Professional wins (5) ==
=== PGA EuroPro Tour wins (4) ===
No.	Date	Tournament	Winning score	Margin of victory	Runner-up
1	10 Aug 2006	Bovey Castle Championship	−3 (70-64-73=207)	2 strokes	(England) Warren Bennett
2	17 Jun 2011	Motocaddy Masters	−10 (68-69-63=200)	1 stroke	(England) Dale Marmion
3	1 Jul 2011	Galgorm Castle Northern Ireland Open	−14 (66-71-65=202)	Playoff	(England) Graeme Clark
4	26 Aug 2011	Network Veka Classic	−15 (67-63-71=201)	7 strokes	(England) Kevin Harper

=== Jamega Pro Golf Tour wins (1) ===
No.	Date	Tournament	Winning score	Margin of victory	Runner-up
1	16 Apr 2013	Mill Green	−12 (65-67=132)	3 strokes	(England) Warren Bennett

== See also ==
- 2015 European Tour Qualifying School graduates
