= 2018 Challenge Tour graduates =

This is a list of players who graduated from the Challenge Tour in 2018. The top 15 players on the Challenge Tour rankings in 2018 earned European Tour cards for 2019.

	2018 Challenge Tour		2019 European Tour				
Player	Points rank	Points	Starts	Cuts made	Best finish	Points rank	Points
(Denmark) Joachim B. Hansen	1	192,320	31	22	2nd	49	1,235
(Spain) Adri Arnaus*	2	185,836	31	20	2nd	41	1,499
(France) Victor Perez^{†}	3	184,236	24	19	Win	13	2,582
(Finland) Kalle Samooja*	4	140,243	28	16	T2	62	960
(Sweden) Sebastian Söderberg	5	140,167	29	16	Win	52	1,116
(England) Jack Singh Brar*	6	128,582	29	17	T8	110	470
(Scotland) Grant Forrest^{†}	7	127,502	27	16	T6	94	533
(Finland) Kim Koivu^{†}	8	126,673	27	14	T9	156	244
(Wales) Stuart Manley	9	120,258	29	17	T21	161	220
(Scotland) Liam Johnston*	10	119,169	30	13	T5	148	296
(United States) Sean Crocker^{†}	11	115,074	25	12	T2	82	690
(Scotland) Robert MacIntyre*	12	114,368	30	25	2nd	11	2,763
(Italy) Lorenzo Gagli	13	113,893	26	11	T2	104	494
(Scotland) David Law*	14	108,107	27	13	Win	92	554
(Portugal) Pedro Figueiredo*	15	94,340	29	12	T23	177	156

* European Tour rookie in 2019
^{†} First-time member ineligible for Rookie of the Year award
T = Tied
The player retained his European Tour card for 2020 (finished inside the top 115).
The player did not retain his European Tour card for 2020, but retained conditional status (finished between 116 and 155, inclusive).
The player did not retain his European Tour card for 2020 (finished outside the top 155).

Koivu earned promotion to the European Tour in August after his third Challenge Tour win of the season.

== Winners on the European Tour in 2019 ==
No.	Date	Player	Tournament	Winning score	Margin of victory	Runners-up
1	10 Feb	(Scotland) David Law	ISPS Handa Vic Open	−18 (67-66-71-66=270)	1 stroke	(Australia) Brad Kennedy (Australia) Wade Ormsby
2	1 Sep	(Sweden) Sebastian Söderberg	Omega European Masters	−14 (64-70-66-66=266)	Playoff	(Italy) Lorenzo Gagli (Northern Ireland) Rory McIlroy (Argentina) Andrés Romero (Finland) Kalle Samooja
3	29 Sep	(France) Victor Perez	Alfred Dunhill Links Championship	−22 (64-68-64-70=266)	1 stroke	(England) Matthew Southgate

== Runners-up on the European Tour in 2019 ==
No.	Date	Player	Tournament	Winner	Winning score	Runner-up score
1	17 Mar	(Spain) Adri Arnaus	Magical Kenya Open	(Italy) Guido Migliozzi	−17 (67-68-64-69=268)	−16 (66-68-65-70=269)
2	28 Apr	(United States) Sean Crocker	Trophée Hassan II	(Spain) Jorge Campillo	−9 (72-71-69-71=283)	−7 (67-74-72-72=285)
3	12 May	(Scotland) Robert MacIntyre	Betfred British Masters	(Sweden) Marcus Kinhult	−16 (65-69-68-70=272)	−15 (68-69-68-68=273)
4	26 May	(Scotland) Robert MacIntyre (2)	Made in Denmark	(Austria) Bernd Wiesberger	−14 (68-69-67-66=270)	−13 (67-70-68-66=271)
5	30 Jun	(Spain) Adri Arnaus (2)	Estrella Damm N.A. Andalucía Masters	(South Africa) Christiaan Bezuidenhout	−10 (66-68-69-71=274)	−4 (68-70-73-69=280)
6	18 Aug	(Spain) Adri Arnaus (3)	D+D Real Czech Masters	(Belgium) Thomas Pieters	−19 (67-67-66-69=269)	−18 (71-65-65-69=270)
7 & 8	1 Sep	(Italy) Lorenzo Gagli	Omega European Masters	(Sweden) Sebastian Söderberg	−14 (64-70-66-66=266)	−14 (64-68-67-67=266)
7 & 8	1 Sep	(Finland) Kalle Samooja	Omega European Masters	(Sweden) Sebastian Söderberg	−14 (64-70-66-66=266)	−14 (66-71-62-67=266)
9	8 Sep	(Scotland) Robert MacIntyre (3)	Porsche European Open	(England) Paul Casey	−14 (66-73-68-66=274)	−13 (68-65-74-68=275)
10	20 Oct	(Denmark) Joachim B. Hansen	Amundi Open de France	(Belgium) Nicolas Colsaerts	−12 (67-66-67-72=272)	−11 (68-68-69-68=273)
11	11 Nov	(France) Victor Perez	Turkish Airlines Open	(England) Tyrrell Hatton	−20 (68-68-65-67=268)	−20 (68-69-66-65=268)

== See also ==
- 2018 European Tour Qualifying School graduates
