= Colm Moriarty =

Irish professional golfer (born 1979)

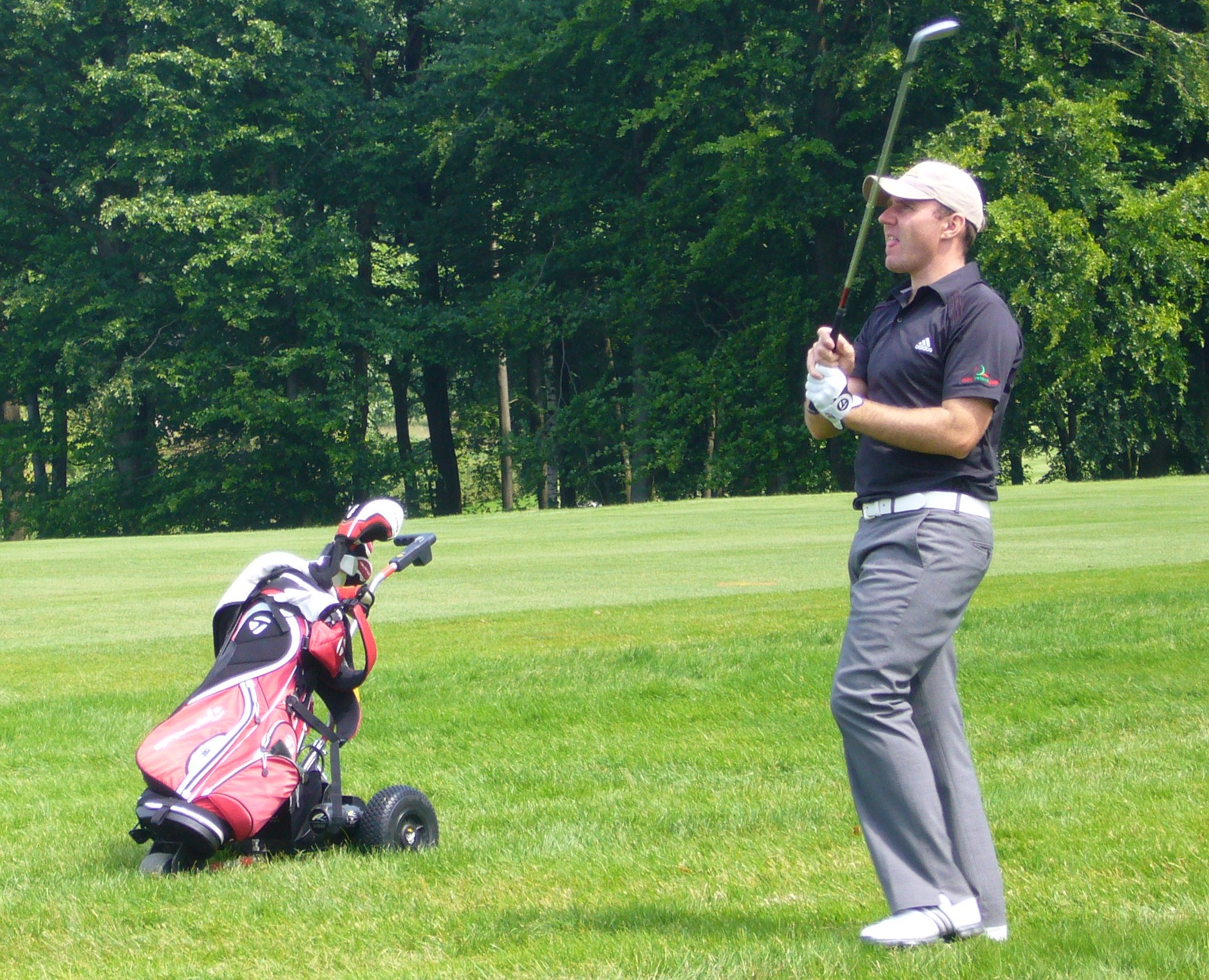
- Moriarty at the 2009 Telenet Trophy

Personal information
- Nationality: Ireland
- Born: 12 June 1979 (age 47) Dublin, Ireland
- Height: 5 ft 10 in (1.78 m)

Career
- Sport: Golf
- Turned professional: 2003
- Former tours: Challenge Tour; PGA EuroPro Tour
- Professional wins: 2

Number of wins by tour
- Challenge Tour: 1
- Other: 1

Best results in major championships
- Masters Tournament: DNP
- PGA Championship: DNP
- U.S. Open: DNP
- The Open Championship: T37: 2010

Colm Moriarty (born 12 June 1979) is an Irish professional golfer.

== Career ==
In 1979, Moriarty was born in Dublin, Ireland. In 2003, he turned professional in 2003 after playing in the victorious Great Britain and Ireland Walker Cup team.

Moriarty has competed mainly on the Challenge Tour during his career and qualifyed for his first full season on the second-tier tour in 2005. In 2007, he recorded wins on both the Challenge Tour, at the Firstplus Wales Challenge, and the third-tier PGA EuroPro Tour, at the Wensum Valley International Open. In July 2010, he led local final qualifying at Kingsbarns to play in his first major; the 2010 Open Championship at St Andrews, where he made the cut and finished tied 37th. In 2024, Moriarty was part of the GB&I PGA Cup team.

== Amateur wins ==
- 2003 New South Wales Medal, New South Wales Amateur Championship

== Professional wins (2) ==
=== Challenge Tour wins (1) ===
No.	Date	Tournament	Winning score	Margin of victory	Runner-up
1	29 Jul 2007	Firstplus Wales Challenge	−13 (68-65-70=203) (Note: Shortened to 54 holes due to weather.)	3 strokes	(Chile) Felipe Aguilar

=== PGA EuroPro Tour wins (1) ===
No.	Date	Tournament	Winning score	Margin of victory	Runner-up
1	3 May 2007	Wensum Valley International Open	−6 (68-70-72=210)	2 strokes	(England) Neil Walker

== Results in major championships ==
Tournament	2010
The Open Championship	T37

Note: Moriarty only played in The Open Championship.
"T" = tied

== Team appearances ==
Amateur

- Eisenhower Trophy (representing Ireland): 2002
- Walker Cup (representing Great Britain & Ireland): 2003 (winners)
- European Amateur Team Championship (representing Ireland): 2005

Professional

- PGA Cup (representing Great Britain & Ireland): 2024
