= 2015 European Tour Qualifying School graduates =

This is a list of the 27 players who earned 2016 European Tour professional golf cards through Q School in 2015.

Place	Player	European Tour starts	Cuts made	Notes
T1	(South Africa) Ulrich van den Berg	70	27	7 Sunshine Tour wins
T1	(Spain) Adrián Otaegui	74	31	
T1	(United States) Daniel Im	30	20	1 Challenge Tour win
T4	(South Africa) Jean Hugo	135	70	17 Sunshine Tour wins; 1 Challenge Tour win
T4	(England) Ross McGowan	136	75	1 European Tour win
6	(England) Matthew Southgate	35	15	
T7	(Australia) Jason Scrivener	27	16	
T7	(England) Daniel Gavins	2	0	
T9	(South Africa) Justin Walters	104	50	2 Sunshine Tour wins
T9	(England) David Dixon	226	94	1 European Tour win
T9	(England) Richard McEvoy	234	99	1 Challenge Tour win
T9	(Denmark) Lasse Jensen	52	27	
T13	(Wales) Stuart Manley	157	60	1 Challenge Tour win
T13	(England) James Robinson	3	0	
T13	(Italy) Francesco Laporta	8	2	
T13	(Republic of Ireland) Paul Dunne	5	4	
T13	(Sweden) Marcus Kinhult	3	3	
T13	(United States) Jason Knutzon	121	67	2 Asian Tour wins
T19	(England) Ryan Evans	5	5	
T19	(England) Laurie Canter	3	0	
T19	(Italy) Nino Bertasio	7	0	
T22	(France) Clément Berardo	1	0	
T22	(England) Richard Finch	304	145	2 European Tour wins
T24	(Italy) Edoardo Molinari	192	116	2 European Tour wins
T24	(Austria) Lukas Nemecz	9	4	
T24	(Italy) Nicolò Ravano	5	1	
T24	(England) Chris Hanson	9	6	

2016 European Tour rookie

== 2016 Results ==
Player	Starts	Cuts made	Best finish	Money list rank	Earnings (€)
(South Africa) Ulrich van den Berg	18	4	T18	207	33,785
(Spain) Adrián Otaegui	27	15	2	69	506,211
(United States) Daniel Im*	25	15	T3	109	250,317
(South Africa) Jean Hugo	18	8	T7	164	90,346
(England) Ross McGowan	18	6	T7	172	80,451
(England) Matthew Southgate	30	17	4	56	681,382
(Australia) Jason Scrivener	24	14	3	105	261,841
(England) Daniel Gavins*	16	4	T28	208	33,139
(South Africa) Justin Walters	23	13	T3	92	340,331
(England) David Dixon	20	8	7	162	93,586
(England) Richard McEvoy	22	13	3	123	213,309
(Denmark) Lasse Jensen	24	12	2	78	433,603
(Wales) Stuart Manley	20	13	T13	153	115,099
(England) James Robinson*	16	5	T34	211	29,892
(Italy) Francesco Laporta*	19	7	T22	189	51,129
(Republic of Ireland) Paul Dunne*	23	13	9	106	260,793
(Sweden) Marcus Kinhult*	12	2	T26	223	21,300
(United States) Jason Knutzon	14	9	T10	178	61,642
(England) Ryan Evans*	22	12	T3	135	171,025
(England) Laurie Canter*	17	7	T34	193	47,983
(Italy) Nino Bertasio*	23	17	T5	96	319,338
(France) Clément Berardo*	20	8	T3	146	134,038
(England) Richard Finch	3	0	Cut	n/a	0
(Italy) Edoardo Molinari	26	13	T12	148	132,581
(Austria) Lukas Nemecz*	17	10	T18	183	57,451
(Italy) Nicolò Ravano*	15	5	T27	192	49,309
(England) Chris Hanson*	21	16	T5	108	253,254

* European Tour rookie in 2016
T = Tied
The player retained his European Tour card for 2017 (finished inside the top 111).
The player did not retain his European Tour card for 2017, but retained conditional status (finished between 112 and 148, inclusive).
The player did not retain his European Tour card for 2017 (finished outside the top 148).

McEvoy, Manley, Canter, and Molinari regained their cards for 2017 through Q School.

== Runners-up on the European Tour in 2016 ==
No.	Date	Player	Tournament	Winner	Winning score	Runner-up score
1	5 Jun	(Denmark) Lasse Jensen	Nordea Masters	(England) Matth Fitzpatrick	−16 (68-65-68-71=272)	−13 (72-69-66-68=275)
2	12 Jun	(Spain) Adrián Otaegui	Lyoness Open	(China) Wu Ashun	−13 (69-72-65-69=275)	−12 (64-76-67-69=276)

== See also ==
- 2015 Challenge Tour graduates
- 2016 European Tour
