= Grant Forrest =

Scottish golfer (born 1993)

Personal information
- Nationality: Scotland
- Born: 19 June 1993 (age 33) Livingston, West Lothian, Scotland
- Height: 1.80 m (5 ft 11 in)
- Weight: 75 kg (165 lb; 11.8 st)

Career
- Sport: Golf
- College: University of San Diego
- Turned professional: 2016
- Current tour: European Tour
- Former tour: Challenge Tour
- Professional wins: 3

Number of wins by tour
- European Tour: 3

Best results in major championships
- Masters Tournament: DNP
- PGA Championship: DNP
- U.S. Open: CUT: 2024
- The Open Championship: CUT: 2013, 2018

Grant Forrest (born 19 June 1993) is a Scottish professional golfer. He plays on the European Tour, where he has won three times. Forrest also had a successful amateur career which included being runner-up in the Amateur Championship and playing in the 2015 Walker Cup.

== Amateur career ==
Forrest had an exceptionally successful amateur career. He won the Scottish Amateur in 2012 and the St Andrews Links Trophy in 2014. He reached the final of the 2015 Amateur Championship where he lost 4&2 to Romain Langasque and played in the Walker Cup later the same year.

Forrest played college golf at the University of San Diego where he won four events. He turned professional in late 2016.

== Professional career ==
Forrest made his professional debut at the 2016 Alfred Dunhill Links Championship, finishing tied for 41st place. He played on the Challenge Tour in 2017 with a best finish of tied for second place in the Hainan Open and finished 34th in the Order of Merit.

Forrest played on the Challenge Tour again in 2018. In May he reached the final of the Andalucía Costa del Sol Match Play 9, losing to Liam Johnston in the final by 1 hole. The following month he lost to Stuart Manley in a playoff in the Hauts de France Golf Open, after making a bogey at the third extra hole. He was runner-up for the third time in the Hainan Open in October and finished 7th in the Order of Merit to earn a place on the 2019 European Tour.

Forrest finished 94th in the 2019 European Tour Order of Merit and 72nd in the 2020 Order of Merit, with five top-10 finishes over the two seasons.

In July 2021, Forrest was in contention to win the Dubai Duty Free Irish Open but after a par-5 at the 17th hole and a double-bogey 6 at the final hole he finished in a tie for fourth place. The following month he won the Hero Open by one stroke from James Morrison, finishing with two birdies at the last two holes.

In August 2025, Forrest won the Nexo Championship at Trump International Golf Links, Scotland. It was his second European Tour win and he also received a congratulatory video call from U.S. President Donald Trump immediately after the tournament.

== Amateur wins ==
- 2009 Scottish Under 16 Championship
- 2010 Scottish Boys Championship
- 2012 Scottish Amateur
- 2013 West Coast Conference Championship, Saint Mary's Invitational
- 2014 The Farms Collegiate Invite, Seattle University Redhawk Invite, St Andrews Links Trophy
- 2016 Battle Trophy

== Professional wins (3) ==
=== European Tour wins (3) ===
No.	Date	Tournament	Winning score	Margin of victory	Runner(s)-up
1	8 Aug 2021	Hero Open	−24 (68-68-62-66=264)	1 stroke	(England) James Morrison
2	10 Aug 2025	Nexo Championship	−8 (71-66-71-72=280)	4 strokes	(England) Joe Dean
3	11 Oct 2026	Open de España	−14 (66-67-67-70=270)	1 stroke	(Spain) Eugenio Chacarra, (France) Victor Perez

== Playoff record ==
Challenge Tour playoff record (0–1)

No.	Year	Tournament	Opponent	Result
1	2018	Hauts de France Golf Open	(Wales) Stuart Manley	Lost to par on third extra hole

== Results in major championships ==
Tournament	2013	2014	2015	2016	2017	2018
Masters Tournament						
U.S. Open						
The Open Championship	CUT					CUT
PGA Championship						

Tournament	2019	2020	2021	2022	2023	2024
Masters Tournament						
PGA Championship						
U.S. Open						CUT
The Open Championship		NT				

Did not play

CUT = missed the half-way cut
"T" indicates a tie for a place
NT = no tournament

== Team appearances ==
Amateur

- European Boys' Team Championship (representing Scotland): 2010, 2011
- Jacques Léglise Trophy (representing Great Britain & Ireland): 2010
- European Amateur Team Championship (representing Scotland): 2014, 2015 (winners), 2016 (winners)
- Palmer Cup (representing Europe): 2014 (winners)
- St Andrews Trophy (representing Great Britain & Ireland): 2014 (winners), 2016 (tie)
- Eisenhower Trophy (representing Scotland): 2014, 2016
- Walker Cup (representing Great Britain & Ireland): 2015 (winners)
- Bonallack Trophy (representing Europe): 2016 (winners)

== See also ==
- 2018 Challenge Tour graduates
