= Richard Finch (golfer) =

English professional golfer (born 1977)

Personal information
- Nationality: England
- Born: 9 June 1977 (age 49) Hull, England
- Height: 6 ft 2 in (1.88 m)
- Weight: 202 lb (92 kg; 14.4 st)

Career
- Sport: Golf
- Turned professional: 2003
- Former tour: European Tour
- Professional wins: 2

Number of wins by tour
- European Tour: 2
- PGA Tour of Australasia: 1

Best results in major championships
- Masters Tournament: DNP
- PGA Championship: DNP
- U.S. Open: DNP
- The Open Championship: T58: 2008

Richard Finch (born 9 July 1977) is an English professional golfer.

== Career ==
Finch played on the European Tour, where he had been a member since 2005. He earned his card through Qualifying School in 2004. In his rookie season, he finished 60th on the Order of Merit, but missed out on the Sir Henry Cotton Rookie of the Year award, which went to Gonzalo Fernández-Castaño instead. His best finish in 2005 was as joint runner-up in the Telecom Italia Open.

Finch picked up his first professional win at the 2007 Michael Hill New Zealand Open. He shot a 14-under-par total of 274 (73-65-64-72) to win the tournament by three shots. In May 2008, Finch won the Irish Open at Adare Manor. On the final hole of the tournament, his second shot on the par-5 18th finished on the bank of the river. While playing his third shot, he lost his balance and fell into the water. This moment garnered much attention due to the comedic nature of the event. In July 2022, at the J. P. McManus Pro-Am, Tiger Woods reminisced about the incident in a pre-round interview. However he incorrectly cited Finch's first name as being Robert.

Since 2008 his best finishes have been as runner-up; in the 2010 Avantha Masters, the 2010 Open de Andalucía de Golf, the 2011 Nordea Scandinavian Masters and the 2013 Alfred Dunhill Championship.

== Amateur wins ==
- 2000 Spanish International Amateur Championship
- 2002 English Amateur
- 2003 St Andrews Links Trophy

== Professional wins (2) ==
=== European Tour wins (2) ===
No.	Date	Tournament	Winning score	Margin of victory	Runner(s)-up
1	2 Dec 2007 (2008 season)	Michael Hill New Zealand Open^{1}	−14 (73-65-64-72=274)	3 strokes	(Australia) Steven Bowditch, (Australia) Paul Sheehan
2	18 May 2008	Irish Open	−10 (71-72-65-70=278)	2 strokes	(Chile) Felipe Aguilar

^{1}Co-sanctioned by the PGA Tour of Australasia

== Results in major championships ==
Tournament	2008	2009	2010	2011	2012
The Open Championship	T58	CUT			CUT

Note: Finch only played in The Open Championship.

Did not play

CUT = missed the halfway cut
"T" = tied

== Results in World Golf Championships ==
Tournament	2008	2009
Match Play		
Championship		T40
Invitational	T36	
Champions		

Did not play

"T" = Tied
Note that the HSBC Champions did not become a WGC event until 2009.

== Team appearances ==
Amateur

- European Amateur Team Championship (representing England): 2003

== See also ==
- 2015 European Tour Qualifying School graduates
