= Saujana Golf and Country Club =

Golf course in Shah Alam, Selangor, Malaysia

Coordinates: 3.1058706°N 101.5686464°E

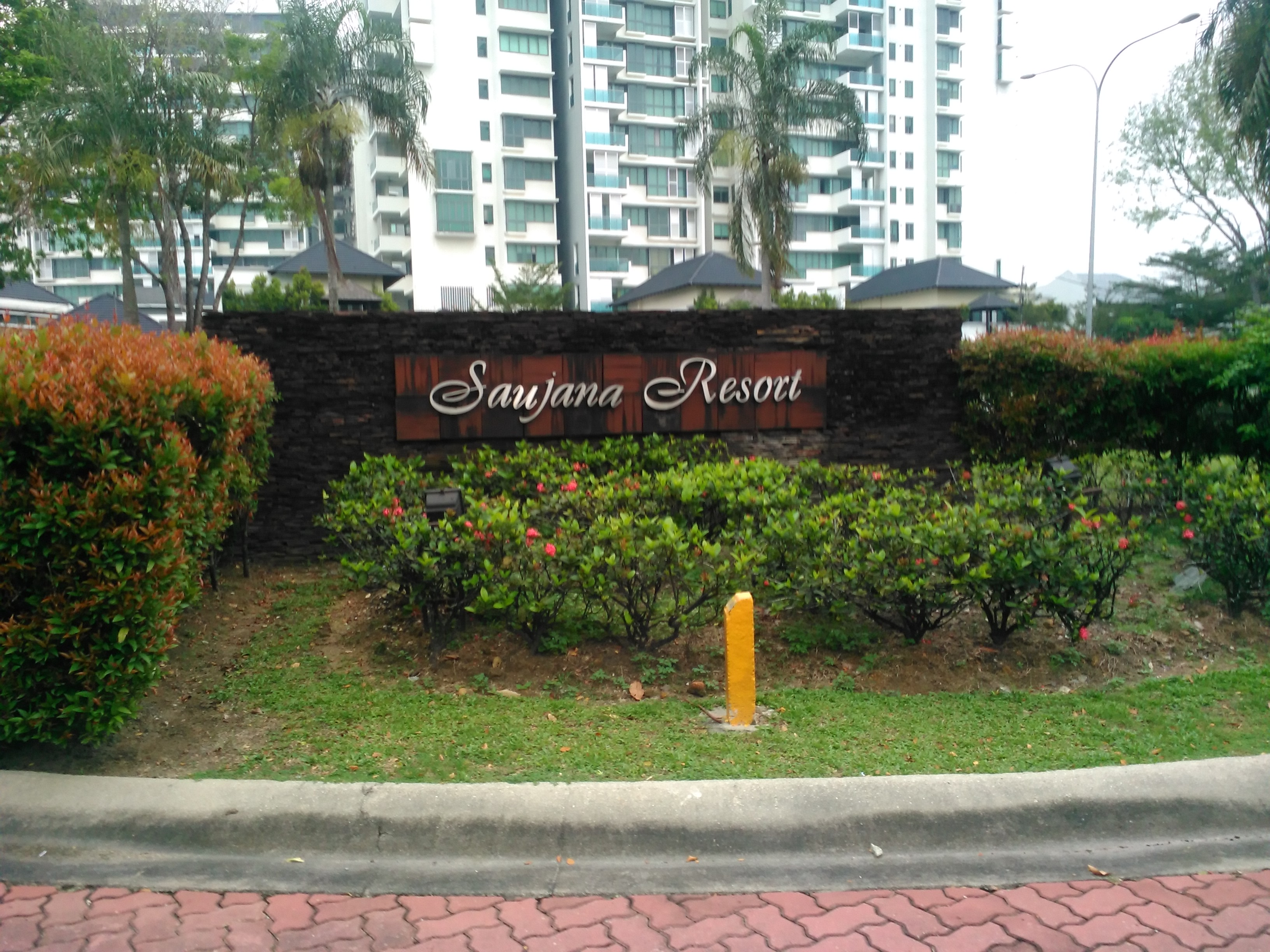
- Interactive map of Saujana Golf and Country Club

Club information
- Location: Shah Alam, Petaling, Selangor, Malaysia
- Established: 1985
- Type: Private
- Owner: Saujana Resort (M) Berhad
- Total holes: 36

Saujana Golf and Country Club is a two 18-holes golf course in Shah Alam, Petaling District, Selangor, Malaysia.

The Japanese School of Kuala Lumpur is located on the grounds of the resort.

== Saujana Resort residential development ==
There are several up-market residential developments in the Saujana Resort.

Gated Communities

These neighbourhoods, with homes on private land, are located around the fringes of the golf course:

1. Lake View
2. Pinggiran Golf
3. Palm View
4. Glenhill Saujana
5. Maplewoods Saujana

Condominiums

1. Bunga Raya Condominium
2. Serai Saujana
3. Amaya Saujana

== Events ==
- Malaysian Open golf tournament
