= Richard Mansell (golfer) =

English professional golfer (born 1995)

Personal information
- Full name: Richard Henry Mansell
- Nationality: England
- Born: 24 April 1995 (age 31) Lichfield, England
- Spouse: Ellie Jones (m. 2023)

Career
- Sport: Golf
- College: Nova Southeastern University (2014–2017); Newberry College (2013–2014)
- Turned professional: 2017
- Current tour: European Tour
- Former tours: Challenge Tour; PGA EuroPro Tour
- Professional wins: 2

Number of wins by tour
- European Tour: 1

Best results in major championships
- Masters Tournament: DNP
- PGA Championship: DNP
- U.S. Open: CUT: 2022, 2024
- The Open Championship: T50: 2024

Richard Henry Mansell (born 24 April 1995) is an English professional golfer who plays on the European Tour, where he has won once at the 2025 Porsche Singapore Classic.

== Amateur career ==
Mansell attended Nova Southeastern University from 2014 to 2017, having previously spent one season at Newberry College.

== Professional career ==
Mansell turned professional in 2017 and began playing on the PGA EuroPro Tour. He claimed his first professional win in July 2019 at the Cobra Puma Championship and the following month began playing on the Challenge Tour via invitations. In 2020, aided by runner-up finishes at the Andalucía Challenge de España and the dual-ranking Euram Bank Open, he finished fourth on the Road to Mallorca Rankings and gained status on the European Tour for the 2021 season. Mansell qualified for the 2021 Open Championship via final qualifying at Holinwell.

In October 2022, Mansell held the 54-hole lead at the Alfred Dunhill Links Championship. He had a four-shot lead going into Sunday, but a final-round 76 saw him drop to tied-for-seventh place.

In March 2025, Mansell claimed his first European Tour victory at the rain-shortened Porsche Singapore Classic.

== Amateur wins ==
- 2017 Armstrong Pirate Invite

== Professional wins (2) ==
=== European Tour wins (1) ===
No.	Date	Tournament	Winning score	Margin of victory	Runner-up
1	23 Mar 2025	Porsche Singapore Classic	−16 (68-66-66=200) (Note: Shortened to 54 holes due to weather.)	1 stroke	(Japan) Keita Nakajima

=== PGA EuroPro Tour wins (1) ===
No.	Date	Tournament	Winning score	Margin of victory	Runner-up
1	12 Jul 2019	Cobra Puma Championship	−18 (65-67-69=201)	3 strokes	(England) Will Enefer

== Results in major championships ==
Tournament	2021	2022	2023	2024
Masters Tournament				
PGA Championship				
U.S. Open		CUT		CUT
The Open Championship	T74	T68		T50

Did not play

CUT = missed the half-way cut
"T" = tied

== Team appearances ==
Amateur

- Arnold Palmer Cup (representing Europe): 2017

Professional

- Hero Cup (representing Great Britain & Ireland): 2023
