= Elliot Saltman =

Scottish golfer

Personal information
- Nationality: Scotland
- Born: 24 March 1982 (age 44) Edinburgh, Scotland
- Height: 6 ft 4 in (1.93 m)
- Weight: 238 lb (108 kg; 17.0 st)

Career
- Sport: Golf
- Turned professional: 2006
- Former tours: European Tour; Challenge Tour; PGA EuroPro Tour
- Professional wins: 6

Best results in major championships
- Masters Tournament: DNP
- PGA Championship: DNP
- U.S. Open: DNP
- The Open Championship: CUT: 2009, 2012

Achievements and awards
- PGA EuroPro Tour Order of Merit winner: 2014

Elliot Saltman (born 24 March 1982) is a Scottish professional golfer. He is affiliated to Archerfield Links.

== Early life ==
Saltman was born in Edinburgh, Scotland, and is the brother of Lloyd Saltman and the grandson of former Hibernian goalkeeper Tommy Younger. His youngest brother Zack, is also a professional golfer.

== Professional career ==
In July 2009 Saltman and his brother Lloyd both qualified for the Open Championship at Turnberry, to become the first brothers to appear together in The Open since Seve and Manuel Ballesteros in 1985.

Elliot had his best Challenge Tour finish to date in the 2010 Fred Olsen Challenge de España where he finished second, having led after three rounds, with prize money of €16,500.

Elliot was suspended from European Tour and Challenge Tour tournaments for three months in 2011 for a 'serious breach' of the rules during the Russian Challenge Cup in September 2010. He was accused of replacing his ball on the green incorrectly during the first round. Saltman maintained that he hadn't knowingly broken the rules but decided not to appeal against the suspension.

Elliot and his brother Lloyd both gained full European Tour Cards in December 2010. He played in 18 European Tour events in 2011 but only made the cut four times and finished 198th in the Race to Dubai. His best performance was 12th in the 2011 Saab Wales Open and prize money of €33,471.60. During this tournament Elliot had two holes-in-one at the 17th hole.

Saltman qualified for the 2012 Open Championship at Southport & Ainsdale in the Local Final Qualifying on Tuesday, 3 July. He scored 68 and 70 and was then involved in a playoff. The same week he won the Audi Cork Irish Masters, a PGA EuroPro Tour event, played on the Wednesday, Thursday and Friday at the Fota Island Resort. Scores of 71, 67 and 61 gave him victory by 8 shots and the £10,000 first prize.

== Professional wins (6) ==
=== PGA EuroPro Tour wins (3) ===
No.	Date	Tournament	Winning score	Margin of victory	Runner-up
1	7 Sep 2007	Ethos Group Classic	−10 (66-66-65=197)	Playoff	(England) Matt Ford
2	6 Jul 2012	Audi Cork Irish Masters	−14 (71-67-61=199)	8 strokes	(Wales) Stuart Manley
3	31 Oct 2014	Visit Egypt Tour Championships	−8 (67-71-70=208)	1 stroke	(England) Laurie Canter

=== Hi5 Pro Tour wins (1) ===
No.	Date	Tournament	Winning score	Margin of victory	Runners-up
1	18 Mar 2010	Polaris World Condado	+2 (72-73-73=218)	5 strokes	(Canada) Brad Clapp, (Republic of Ireland) Michael Collins, (Sweden) Fredrik Hammarberg, (Sweden) Andreas Högberg

=== Jamega Pro Golf Tour wins (2) ===
No.	Date	Tournament	Winning score	Margin of victory	Runner(s)-up
1	7 May 2013	Caversham Heath	−9 (68-69=137)	1 stroke	(England) Warren Bennett, (England) Charlie Simpson
2	7 Oct 2014	Woodcote Park	−4 (72-68=140)	1 stroke	(England) James Heath

== Results in major championships ==
Tournament	2009	2010	2011	2012
The Open Championship	CUT			CUT

Note: Saltman only played in The Open Championship.

Did not play

CUT = missed the half-way cut
"T" = tied

== See also ==
- 2010 European Tour Qualifying School graduates
