= Match Play 9 =

Golf tournament

Coordinates: 36.431°N 5.197°W

Andalucía Costa del Sol Match Play 9
Tournament information
- Location: Estepona, Málaga, Spain
- Established: 2017
- Course: Valle Romano Golf
- Par: 71
- Length: 6,781 yards (6,201 m)
- Tour: Challenge Tour
- Format: Stroke play and match play
- Prize fund: €200,000
- Month played: June
- Final year: 2019

Tournament record score
- Score: 2 and 1 Aaron Rai (2017); 2 and 1 Eirik Tage Johansen (2019)

Final champion
- (Norway) Eirik Tage Johansen
- Location in Spain Location in Andalusia

The Andalucía Costa del Sol Match Play 9 was a golf tournament on the Challenge Tour, played in Spain. It was a mixed stroke-play and match-play event, broadly similar to the World Super 6 Perth, the main difference being that the match-play matches were over 9 holes rather than 6. Aaron Rai won the inaugural tournament, beating Gavin Moynihan in the final. The inaugural event was held at La Cala Resort before moving to Valle Romano Golf in 2018 and 2019.

== Format ==
The event started with 36 hole of stroke play over two days. In 2017, the leading 32 players qualified for the match play stage. There was a sudden-death playoff for those tying for 32nd place. Seedings were based on a countback system, so that where players were equal, those having the better second round were seeded higher. There were then five match play rounds, two on the third day and three on the final day, all matches being over 9 holes with a sudden-death playoff if required. There were a number of other matches for the minor places. In 2018 the number of qualifiers for the match play stage was increased to 64 with three rounds on both the third and final days.

== Winners ==
Year	Winner	Score	Runner-up
Andalucía Match Play 9
2020	Postponed due to the COVID-19 pandemic		
Andalucía Costa del Sol Match Play 9
2019	(Norway) Eirik Tage Johansen	2 and 1	(France) Ugo Coussaud
2018	(Scotland) Liam Johnston	1 up	(Scotland) Grant Forrest
2017	(England) Aaron Rai	2 and 1	(Republic of Ireland) Gavin Moynihan
