= PGA EuroPro Tour =

Golf tour in Europe

- Formerly: Golfcatcher PGA EuroPro Tour; HotelPlanner.com PGA EuroPro Tour; 888poker.com PGA EuroPro Tour; Ivobank PGA EuroPro Tour; Matchroom Sport PGA EuroPro Tour
- Sport: Golf
- Founded: 2002
- Founder: Barry Hearn
- First season: 2002
- Folded: 2022
- CEO: Daniel Godding
- Director: Eddie Hearn
- Countries: Based in the United Kingdom (Note: Schedules also included events in Cyprus, Egypt, France, the Republic of Ireland, the Isle of Man, Portugal and Spain.)
- Most titles: Tournament wins: (England) Billy Hemstock (6)
- Broadcasters: Sky Sports; DAZN; Eleven Sports; Fox Australia
- Website: http://www.europrotour.com/

The PGA EuroPro Tour was a men's developmental professional golf tour. It was created in 2002 by the merger of two development tours, the EuroPro Tour and the PGA MasterCard Tour, as the Professional Golfers' Association and Barry Hearn's Matchroom Sport joined forces.

The PGA EuroPro Tour provided professional golfers with an entry point to a career in tournament golf. The top five finishers on the Order of Merit won a tour card for the following season on Europe's second-tier golf tour, the Challenge Tour, and a place at the second stage of the European Tour Qualifying School. Since July 2015, Official World Golf Ranking points were awarded, with four points given to the winner of a tournament.

The tour was based mainly in the United Kingdom, with a few events in other countries. Most of the players were British, with others coming from the Republic of Ireland, Continental Europe and farther afield. In 2020, the total prize money was due to rise to €1 million. However the season was eventually cancelled due to the COVID-19 pandemic.

Prize funds were around £50,000 each. The winner's share was £12,500. The Tour Championship has a £127,500 prize fund with £25,000 going to the winner.

In September 2022, the tour announced that it would cease operating at the end of the 2022 season.

== Television coverage ==
The tour was covered on television with a highlights package of each tournament shown on Sky Sports in the United Kingdom. The tour had also agreed to various broadcast deals with international partners such as DAZN, Fox Sports Australia and Sky NZ.

== Alumni ==
PGA EuroPro Tour alumni include major champions Louis Oosthuizen and Charl Schwartzel, and European Ryder Cup players Nicolas Colsaerts, Jamie Donaldson, Ross Fisher, Tommy Fleetwood and Tyrrell Hatton and Oliver Wilson.

== Order of Merit winners ==
Year	Winner	Prize money (£)
2022	(England) James Allan	60,091
2021	(England) Jamie Rutherford	41,322
2020	Cancelled due to the COVID-19 pandemic	
2019	(Sweden) Mikael Lundberg	37,455
2018	(England) Dave Coupland	42,895
2017	(England) Chris Lloyd	37,695
2016	(England) Matthew Cort	33,920
2015	(England) Jordan Smith	32,984
2014	(Scotland) Elliot Saltman	27,991
2013	(Wales) Oliver Farr	33,495
2012	(England) Paul Maddy	32,822
2011	(England) Chris Hanson	37,930
2010	(Australia) Daniel Gaunt	24,700
2009	(Scotland) Scott Jamieson	23,492
2008	(Republic of Ireland) Noel Fox	26,897
2007	(England) Graeme Clark	43,689
2006	(England) Kevin Harper	29,259
2005	(England) Mark Smith	54,878
2004	(England) Simon Lilly	37,047
2003	(England) Tom Whitehouse	34,182
2002	(Scotland) Paul McKechnie	32,236
