= Oliver Farr =

Welsh golfer (born 1988)

Personal information
- Full name: Oliver James Farr
- Nationality: Wales
- Born: 25 March 1988 (age 38) Redditch, Worcestershire, England
- Height: 1.78 m (5 ft 10 in)
- Weight: 85 kg (187 lb; 13.4 st)

Career
- Sport: Golf
- Turned professional: 2011
- Current tour: European Tour
- Former tour: Challenge Tour
- Professional wins: 6

Number of wins by tour
- Challenge Tour: 3
- Other: 3

Best results in major championships
- Masters Tournament: DNP
- PGA Championship: DNP
- U.S. Open: CUT: 2015
- The Open Championship: CUT: 2022, 2023

Achievements and awards
- PGA EuroPro Tour Order of Merit winner: 2013

Oliver James Farr (born 25 March 1988) is a Welsh professional golfer who plays on the European Tour. He has won three times on the Challenge Tour.

== Professional career ==
Farr played on mini-tours after turning professional. He finished first on the 2013 PGA EuroPro Tour Order of Merit to earn his Challenge Tour card for 2014. He won the Turkish Airlines Challenge in May 2014. He finished the season 10th in the Order of Merit to earn a place on the European Tour for 2015.

Farr only made 10 cuts in 30 events on the 2015 European Tour, lost his card and returned to the Challenge Tour for 2016 where he finished 36th in the Order of Merit. In 2017 he had his second Challenge Tour win, the Foshan Open, and finished the season 10th in the Order of Merit, returning to the European Tour for 2018.

Although Farr's second season on the European Tour was better than his first, he failed to regain his card and again returned to the Challenge Tour for 2019. In 2019 Farr has third win on the Challenge Tour, the Lalla Aïcha Challenge Tour, and by finishing 12th in the Order of Merit he returned to the European Tour for a third time.

== Professional wins (6) ==
=== Challenge Tour wins (3) ===
No.	Date	Tournament	Winning score	Margin of victory	Runner(s)-up
1	18 May 2014	Turkish Airlines Challenge	−2 (72-67-77-70=286)	2 strokes	(England) Dave Coupland, (Denmark) Jeppe Huldahl, (France) Jérôme Lando-Casanova
2	22 Oct 2017	Foshan Open^{1}	−18 (69-66-69-66=270)	5 strokes	(Germany) Sebastian Heisele
3	6 Sep 2019	Lalla Aïcha Challenge Tour	−15 (69-71-70-63=273)	3 strokes	(England) Jack Senior

^{1}Co-sanctioned by the China Tour

Challenge Tour playoff record (0–1)

No.	Year	Tournament	Opponents	Result
1	2016	Swedish Challenge	(France) Joël Stalter, (England) Ben Stow	Stalter won with birdie on second extra hole

=== PGA EuroPro Tour wins (2) ===
No.	Date	Tournament	Winning score	Margin of victory	Runner-up
1	12 Sep 2013	Eagle Orchid Scottish Masters	−5 (70-67-71=208)	Playoff	(England) Daniel Gavins
2	17 Oct 2013	888poker.com Tour Championship	−13 (71-65-67=203)	1 stroke	(England) Daniel Gavins

=== Jamega Pro Golf Tour wins (1) ===
No.	Date	Tournament	Winning score	Margin of victory	Runner-up
1	4 May 2012	Burghill Valley	−6 (66-70=136)	1 stroke	(Wales) Mark Laskey

== Results in major championships ==
Tournament	2015	2016	2017	2018	2019
U.S. Open	CUT				
The Open Championship					

Tournament	2020	2021	2022	2023
U.S. Open				
The Open Championship	NT		CUT	CUT

Did not play

CUT = missed the half-way cut
NT = No tournament due to the COVID-19 pandemic
Note: Farr only played in the U.S. Open and The Open Championship.

== Team appearances ==
Amateur

- European Amateur Team Championship (representing Wales): 2009, 2010, 2011
- Eisenhower Trophy (representing Wales): 2010

== See also ==
- 2014 Challenge Tour graduates
- 2017 Challenge Tour graduates
- 2019 Challenge Tour graduates
