= Jordan Smith (golfer) =

English professional golfer (born 1992)

Personal information
- Full name: Jordan Lewis Smith
- Nationality: England
- Born: 9 November 1992 (age 34) Bath, Somerset, England
- Height: 1.78 m (5 ft 10 in)
- Weight: 87 kg (192 lb; 13.7 st)
- Spouse: Ellie Melling (m. 2021)

Career
- Sport: Golf
- Turned professional: 2014
- Current tour: PGA Tour
- Former tours: European Tour; Challenge Tour; PGA EuroPro Tour
- Professional wins: 7
- Highest ranking: 65 (22 March 2026) (as of 15 November 2026)

Number of wins by tour
- European Tour: 2
- Challenge Tour: 2
- Other: 3

Best results in major championships
- Masters Tournament: DNP
- PGA Championship: T9: 2017
- U.S. Open: T20: 2023
- The Open Championship: T18: 2026

Achievements and awards
- PGA EuroPro Tour Order of Merit winner: 2015
- Challenge Tour Rankings winner: 2016

Jordan Lewis Smith (born 9 November 1992) is an English professional golfer.

== Professional career ==
Smith turned professional in 2014. He played mainly on the PGA EuroPro Tour in 2015 winning twice. He also won the tour's Order of Merit which gained him a Challenge Tour card for 2016. He won two Challenge Tour events in 2016, the Red Sea Egyptian Challenge and the Ras Al Khaimah Golf Challenge. He finished leader of the Challenge Tour Order of Merit to earn a place on the European Tour for 2017.

Smith started the 2022 European Tour season with runner-up finishes at the Ras Al Khaimah Championship and the MyGolfLife Open in South Africa; where he was defeated in a playoff by Pablo Larrazábal on the second extra hole. In October, Smith claimed his second victory on the European Tour at the Portugal Masters, shooting 30-under-par for four rounds (including two rounds of 62) on way to winning by three shots ahead of Gavin Green. It was also a wire-to-wire victory. His aggregate score of 254 and score in relation to par, was better than the European Tour scoring record at the time, however it was considered as an unofficial record due to preferred lies being in place.

== Amateur wins ==
- 2013 Brabazon Trophy
- 2014 Hampshire Salver

== Professional wins (7) ==
=== European Tour wins (2) ===
No.	Date	Tournament	Winning score	Margin of victory	Runner-up
1	30 Jul 2017	Porsche European Open	−13 (70-67-67-71=275)	Playoff	(France) Alexander Lévy
2	30 Oct 2022	Portugal Masters	−30 (62-67-62-63=254)	3 strokes	(Malaysia) Gavin Green

European Tour playoff record (1–1)

No.	Year	Tournament	Opponent(s)	Result
1	2017	Porsche European Open	(France) Alexander Lévy	Won with birdie on second extra hole
2	2022	MyGolfLife Open	(Spain) Adri Arnaus, (Spain) Pablo Larrazábal	Larrazábal won with birdie on second extra hole Arnaus eliminated by birdie on first hole

=== Challenge Tour wins (2) ===
No.	Date	Tournament	Winning score	Margin of victory	Runner(s)-up
1	23 Apr 2016	Red Sea Egyptian Challenge	−18 (63-68-70-69=270)	2 strokes	(Switzerland) Joel Girrbach, (England) Garrick Porteous, (Austria) Manuel Trappel
2	29 Oct 2016	Ras Al Khaimah Golf Challenge	−20 (69-66-67-66=268)	1 stroke	(Portugal) José-Filipe Lima

=== PGA EuroPro Tour wins (2) ===
No.	Date	Tournament	Winning score	Margin of victory	Runners-up
1	31 Jul 2015	PDC Open	−14 (68-68-66=202)	3 strokes	(England) Laurie Canter, (England) Paul Howard, (England) Alex Wrigley
2	30 Oct 2015	Matchroom Sport Tour Championship	−13 (71-68-64=203)	Playoff	(England) Daniel Gavins, (England) Aaron Rai

=== Jamega Pro Golf Tour wins (1) ===
No.	Date	Tournament	Winning score	Margin of victory	Runners-up
1	19 Jul 2010	Magnolia Park (as an amateur)	−8 (70-68=138)	1 stroke	(England) Yasin Ali, (England) Toby Burden, (England) Craig Housden, (England) Andrew Johnston, (England) Oliver Reddick, (England) Neil Reilly

== Results in major championships ==
Results not in chronological order in 2020.

Tournament	2017	2018
Masters Tournament		
U.S. Open		
The Open Championship		CUT
PGA Championship	T9	CUT

Tournament	2019	2020	2021	2022	2023	2024	2025	2026
Masters Tournament								
PGA Championship					CUT	T39		CUT
U.S. Open			CUT		T20		T61	
The Open Championship		NT		T47	T41	CUT	T45	T18

Top 10
Did not play

CUT = missed the half-way cut
"T" indicates a tie for a place
NT = no tournament due to COVID-19 pandemic

=== Summary ===
Tournament	Wins	2nd	3rd	Top-5	Top-10	Top-25	Events	Cuts made
Masters Tournament	0	0	0	0	0	0	0	0
PGA Championship	0	0	0	0	1	1	5	2
U.S. Open	0	0	0	0	0	1	4	2
The Open Championship	0	0	0	0	0	1	6	4
Totals	0	0	0	0	1	3	15	8

- Most consecutive cuts made – 3 (2023 U.S. Open – 2024 PGA Championship)
- Longest streak of top-10s – 1 (once)

== Results in World Golf Championships ==
Tournament	2017
Championship	
Match Play	
Invitational	
Champions	T58

Did not play

"T" = Tied

== Team appearances ==
Amateur

- Walker Cup (representing Great Britain & Ireland): 2013
- European Amateur Team Championship (representing England): 2014

Professional

- Team Cup (representing Great Britain and Ireland): 2023, 2025 (winners)

== See also ==
- 2016 Challenge Tour graduates
- 2025 Race to Dubai dual card winners
