= Ras Al Khaimah Championship =

Golf tournament

Coordinates: 25.690°N 55.776°E

Tournament information
- Location: Ras Al Khaimah, United Arab Emirates
- Established: 2022
- Course: Al Hamra Golf Club
- Par: 72
- Length: 7,400 yards (6,800 m)
- Tour: European Tour
- Format: Stroke play
- Prize fund: US$2,500,000
- Month played: January

Tournament record score
- Aggregate: 261 Thorbjørn Olesen (2024)
- To par: −27 as above

Current champion
- (Spain) Alejandro del Rey

Location map
- Location in the United Arab Emirates

The Ras Al Khaimah Championship is a professional golf tournament held at Al Hamra Golf Club, in Ras Al Khaimah, United Arab Emirates. In 2021, the presenting sponsor was Phoenix Capital.

The event is played at the same venue which hosted the Ras Al Khaimah Golf Challenge in 2016 and 2017 on the Challenge Tour, as well as the Ras Al Khaimah Challenge Tour Grand Final in 2018.

Nicolai Højgaard won the inaugural event, beating Jordan Smith by four shots.

== Winners ==
Year	Winner	Score	To par	Margin of victory	Runner(s)-up
2025	(Spain) Alejandro del Rey	266	−22	4 strokes	(England) Marcus Armitage
2024	(Denmark) Thorbjørn Olesen	261	−27	6 strokes	(Denmark) Rasmus Højgaard
2023	(England) Daniel Gavins	271	−17	1 stroke	(Sweden) Alexander Björk (South Africa) Zander Lombard
2022	(Denmark) Nicolai Højgaard	264	−24	4 strokes	(England) Jordan Smith
