= 2015 PGA EuroPro Tour =

Golf tour season

2015 PGA EuroPro Tour season
- Duration: 13 May 2015 – 30 October 2015
- Number of official events: 16
- Most wins: (England) Marcus Armitage (2) (England) Sam Connor (2) (England) Gary King (2) (England) Jordan Smith (2)
- Order of Merit: (England) Jordan Smith

The 2015 PGA EuroPro Tour, titled as the 2015 HotelPlanner.com PGA EuroPro Tour for sponsorship reasons, was the 14th season of the PGA EuroPro Tour, a third-tier tour recognised by the European Tour.

== OWGR inclusion ==
In July, it was announced that all PGA EuroPro Tour events, beginning with the Wealth Design Invitational, would receive Official World Golf Ranking points at the minimum level of 4 points for the winner of a 54-hole event and 6 points for the winner of a 72-hole event.

== Schedule ==
The following table lists official events during the 2015 season.

Date	Tournament	Location	Purse (£)	Winner (Note: The number in brackets after each winner's name is the number of PGA EuroPro Tour events they had won up to and including that tournament. It is rare for someone to accumulate many wins on the PGA EuroPro Tour as success at this level usually leads to promotion to the Challenge Tour.)	OWGR points
15 May	World Snooker Open	Gwent	49,210	(England) Gary King (1)	n/a
22 May	Buildbase Open	Oxfordshire	47,320	(England) Gary King (2)	n/a
30 May	Kerry London Championship	Surrey	47,885	(England) Darren Wright (1)	n/a
6 Jun	Dawson and Sanderson Forex Classic	Northumberland	48,160	(England) Sam Connor (1)	n/a
19 Jun	Grenke Championship	Wiltshire	48,955	(England) Marcus Armitage (2)	n/a
26 Jun	Paul Lawrie Foundation Granite City Classic	Aberdeenshire	46,735	(England) Paul Howard (1)	n/a
2 Jul	Eagle Orchid Scottish Masters	Angus	48,695	(England) James Wilkinson (1)	n/a
17 Jul	Glenfarclas Open	Renfrewshire	49,945	(England) Aaron Rai (1)	n/a
24 Jul	Wealth Design Invitational	Shropshire	47,605	(England) Andrew Marshall (2)	4
31 Jul	PDC Open	Kent	49,460	(England) Jordan Smith (1)	4
7 Aug	Cobra Puma Golf Open	Dunbartonshire	46,735	(England) Sam Connor (2)	4
13 Aug	Break90 Championship	Northumberland	47,320	(England) Jamie Rutherford (1)	4
21 Aug	Tree of Life Championship	Tyne and Wear	47,605	(England) Marcus Armitage (3)	4
29 Aug	Clipper Logistics Players Championship	West Yorkshire	56,437	(Wales) Mark Laskey (2)	6
4 Sep	HotelPlanner.com Championship	Kent	49,460	(England) Haydn McCullen (1)	4
30 Oct	Matchroom Sport Tour Championship	Spain	87,250	(England) Jordan Smith (2)	4

== Order of Merit ==
The Order of Merit was titled as the Race to Desert Springs and was based on prize money won during the season, calculated in Pound sterling. The top five players on the Order of Merit earned status to play on the 2016 Challenge Tour.

Position	Player	Prize money (£)	Status earned
1	(England) Jordan Smith	32,984	Promoted to Challenge Tour
2	(England) Darren Wright	29,670	Promoted to Challenge Tour
3	(England) Sam Connor	27,296	Promoted to Challenge Tour
4	(England) Marcus Armitage	26,593	Promoted to Challenge Tour
5	(England) Aaron Rai	25,644	Promoted to Challenge Tour
6	(England) Gary King	23,396	Qualified for Challenge Tour (made cut in Q School)
7	(England) Daniel Gavins	19,622	Qualified for European Tour (Top 25 in Q School)
8	(England) Paul Howard	19,542	Qualified for Challenge Tour (made cut in Q School)
9	(Wales) Mark Laskey	18,556	
10	(Scotland) Neil Fenwick	16,313	
