= Turkish Challenge =

Turkish Airlines Challenge
Tournament information
- Location: Atakum, Samsun, Turkey
- Established: 2010
- Course: Samsun Golf Course
- Par: 72
- Length: 6,710 yards (6,140 m)
- Tour: Challenge Tour
- Format: Stroke play
- Prize fund: €200,000
- Month played: April
- Final year: 2019

Tournament record score
- Aggregate: 265 Francesco Laporta (2019); 265 Connor Syme (2019)
- To par: −23 as above

Final champion
- (Scotland) Connor Syme
- Location in Turkey

The Turkish Airlines Challenge is a golf tournament on the Challenge Tour, played in Turkey. It was first played in 2010 when Charlie Ford triumphed in a sudden-death playoff over Oscar Florén. It returned in 2014.

== Winners ==
Year	Winner	Score	To par	Margin of victory	Runner(s)-up	Venue
2019	(Scotland) Connor Syme	265	−23	Playoff (Note: Syme won with birdie on first extra hole.)	(Italy) Francesco Laporta	Samsun
2018	(Denmark) Joachim B. Hansen	270	−18	3 strokes	(Italy) Lorenzo Gagli (England) Jack Singh Brar	Gloria
2017	(England) Ryan Evans	267	−21	4 strokes	(Finland) Tapio Pulkkanen	Gloria
2016	(France) Clément Sordet	268	−20	1 stroke	(France) Matthieu Pavon	Gloria
2015	(Wales) Rhys Davies	274	−14	4 strokes	(Italy) Lorenzo Gagli	Gloria
2014	(Wales) Oliver Farr	286	−2	2 strokes	(England) Dave Coupland (Denmark) Jeppe Huldahl (France) Jérôme Lando-Casanova	National
2011–2013: No tournament
2010	(England) Charlie Ford	277	−11	Playoff (Note: Ford won with birdie on first extra hole.)	(Sweden) Oscar Florén	Carya
