= 2016 Challenge Tour graduates =

This is a list of players who graduated from the Challenge Tour in 2016. The top 16 players on the Challenge Tour rankings in 2016 earned European Tour cards for 2017.

| | 2016 Challenge Tour | | 2017 European Tour | | | | |
| Player | Road to Oman rank | Points | Starts | Cuts made | Best finish | Money list rank | Earnings (€) |
|---|---|---|---|---|---|---|---|
| (England) Jordan Smith* | 1 | 209,985 | 31 | 25 | Win | 24 | 1,290,602 |
| (Germany) Bernd Ritthammer | 2 | 189,953 | 26 | 10 | T11 | 124 | 272,289 |
| (Germany) Alexander Knappe* | 3 | 183,500 | 27 | 11 | T5 | 140 | 215,147 |
| (New Zealand) Ryan Fox* | 4 | 160,768 | 29 | 21 | T4 | 34 | 1,080,610 |
| (England) Sam Walker | 5 | 158,370 | 29 | 8 | T4 | 157 | 158,785 |
| (France) Matthieu Pavon* | 6 | 150,504 | 30 | 16 | 3 | 49 | 866,853 |
| (Sweden) Alexander Björk* | 7 | 135,006 | 30 | 23 | T3 | 43 | 947,873 |
| (South Africa) Dylan Frittelli* | 8 | 120,892 | 29 | 18 | Win | 19 | 1,602,951 |
| (France) Romain Langasque* | 9 | 118,087 | 27 | 11 | T10 | 151 | 178,683 |
| (Scotland) Duncan Stewart* | 10 | 115,764 | 28 | 12 | T9 | 131 | 241,658 |
| (England) Marcus Armitage* | 11 | 115,760 | 26 | 11 | T10 | 152 | 168,137 |
| (Portugal) José-Filipe Lima | 12 | 100,108 | 23 | 10 | T5 | 138 | 218,629 |
| (France) Damien Perrier* | 13 | 95,368 | 27 | 12 | T29 | 174 | 102,350 |
| (Spain) Pep Anglès* | 14 | 93,286 | 27 | 13 | 4 | 139 | 216,288 |
| (Belgium) Thomas Detry* | 15 | 92,852 | 27 | 17 | T2 | 86 | 440,214 |
| (France) Joël Stalter* | 16 | 91,578 | 26 | 11 | T3 | 132 | 239,430 |

* European Tour rookie in 2017
T = Tied
The player retained his European Tour card for 2018 (finished inside the top 101 or the top 10 of the Access List).
The player did not retain his European Tour card for 2018, but retained conditional status (finished between 102 and 147, inclusive).
The player did not retain his European Tour card for 2018 (finished outside the top 147).

Ritthammer won three times on the Challenge Tour in 2016. A change before the season to the tour regulations allowed amateurs to earn ranking points, while also dictating that any player within the top 15 who earned points as an amateur would be counted in addition to the usual 15 graduates; therefore, since Langasque had earned 24,200 points as an amateur, the number of graduates was increased to 16. Anglès regained his card for 2018 through Q School.

== Winners on the European Tour in 2017 ==
| No. | Date | Player | Tournament | Winning score | Margin of victory | Runners-up |
|---|---|---|---|---|---|---|
| 1 | 11 Jun | (South Africa) Dylan Frittelli | Lyoness Open | −12 (70-71-68-67=276) | 1 stroke | (England) David Horsey (Finland) Mikko Korhonen (South Africa) Jbe' Kruger |
| 2 | 30 Jul | (England) Jordan Smith | Porsche European Open | −13 (70-67-67-71=275) | Playoff | (France) Alexander Lévy |

== Runners-up on the European Tour in 2017 ==
| No. | Date | Player | Tournament | Winner | Winning score | Runner-up score |
|---|---|---|---|---|---|---|
| 1 | 30 Apr | (South Africa) Dylan Frittelli; Lost in playoff | Volvo China Open | (France) Alexander Lévy | −17 (63-70-71-67=271) | −17 (70-63-64-74=271) |
| 2 | 25 Jun | (Belgium) Thomas Detry | BMW International Open | (Argentina) Andrés Romero | −17 (67-71-68-65=271) | −16 (65-71-70-66=272) |
| 3 | 5 Nov | (South Africa) Dylan Frittelli (2) | Turkish Airlines Open | (England) Justin Rose | −18 (69-68-64-65=266) | −17 (70-67-66-64=267) |

Rolex Series

== See also ==
- 2016 European Tour Qualifying School graduates
