= Marcus Armitage =

English professional golfer

Personal information
- Full name: Marcus Ashley Philip Armitage
- Nickname: The Bullet
- Nationality: England
- Born: 15 July 1987 (age 39) Salford, Greater Manchester, England
- Height: 1.83 m (6 ft 0 in)
- Weight: 90 kg (200 lb; 14 st)

Career
- Sport: Golf
- Turned professional: 2008
- Current tour: European Tour
- Former tours: Challenge Tour; PGA EuroPro Tour
- Professional wins: 6

Number of wins by tour
- European Tour: 1
- Challenge Tour: 1
- Other: 4

Best results in major championships
- Masters Tournament: DNP
- PGA Championship: DNP
- U.S. Open: CUT: 2021
- The Open Championship: T53: 2021

Marcus Ashley Philip Armitage (born 15 July 1987) is an English professional golfer. He won the 2021 Porsche European Open on the European Tour.

== Professional career ==
Armitage turned professional in 2008. He played on the PGA EuroPro Tour in 2013, earning rookie of the year honours. He also won on tour as part of fourteen total victories for the year. Over the 2014 season, Armitage reworked his swing. Armitage won twice on the 2015 PGA EuroPro Tour, finished fourth in the money list, and earned his tour card for the 2016 Challenge Tour.

Armitage won the 2016 Foshan Open on the Challenge Tour. He was also a runner-up in the Volopa Irish Challenge and finished 11th in the Order of Merit to earn his tour card for the 2017 European Tour.

Armitage had a disappointing season in 2017 and lost his card on the main tour. He made a useful start of the 2018 Challenge Tour season with a runner-up finish in the Belt & Road Colorful Yunnan Open. He had two moderate seasons on the Challenge Tour, finishing 50th in the 2018 Order of Merit and 85th in 2019. However he earned a return to the European Tour with a good performance in the European Tour Q School. In January 2020, he recorded his best finish on the European Tour at the time, when he was third in the South African Open.

In June 2021, Armitage claimed his first victory on the European Tour at the Porsche European Open. He shot a final-round 65 to win by two shots.

== Professional wins (6) ==
=== European Tour wins (1) ===
No.	Date	Tournament	Winning score	Margin of victory	Runners-up
1	7 Jun 2021	Porsche European Open	−8 (72-71-65=208) (Note: Shortened to 54 holes due to COVID-19 travel restrictions in Germany.)	2 strokes	(Belgium) Thomas Detry, (Italy) Edoardo Molinari, (England) Matthew Southgate, (Netherlands) Darius van Driel

=== Challenge Tour wins (1) ===
No.	Date	Tournament	Winning score	Margin of victory	Runners-up
1	23 Oct 2016	Foshan Open	−19 (69-68-65-67=269)	1 stroke	(Germany) Alexander Knappe, (France) Matthieu Pavon

=== PGA EuroPro Tour wins (3) ===
No.	Date	Tournament	Winning score	Margin of victory	Runner-up
1	26 Jul 2013	Kingspan Concra Wood Open	−8 (73-67-68=208)	2 strokes	(Scotland) Paul Doherty
2	19 Jun 2015	Grenke Championship	−10 (68-69-66=203)	1 stroke	(England) Steve Surry
3	21 Aug 2015	Tree of Life Championship	−11 (67-67-68=202)	2 strokes	(Republic of Ireland) Brian Casey

=== Jamega Pro Golf Tour wins (1) ===
No.	Date	Tournament	Winning score	Margin of victory	Runners-up
1	16 Apr 2019	Oxford Golf Club	−8 (67-65=132)	3 strokes	(England) Jamie Abbott, (England) Nathan Kimsey, (England) Christopher Lloyd

== Results in major championships ==
Results not in chronological order before 2019 and in 2020.

Tournament	2018	2019	2020	2021	2022
Masters Tournament					
PGA Championship					
U.S. Open				CUT	
The Open Championship	CUT		NT	T53	T74

Did not play

CUT = missed the half-way cut
"T" = tied
NT = No tournament due to COVID-19 pandemic

== See also ==
- 2016 Challenge Tour graduates
- 2019 European Tour Qualifying School graduates
