= 2015 Alps Tour =

Golf tour season

2015 Alps Tour season
- Duration: 17 February 2015 – 25 October 2015
- Number of official events: 20
- Most wins: (England) Harry Casey (2) (England) Josh Loughrey (2)
- Order of Merit: (Netherlands) Darius van Driel

The 2015 Alps Tour was the 15th season of the Alps Tour, a third-tier golf tour recognised by the European Tour.

== OWGR inclusion ==
In July, it was announced that all Alps Tour events, beginning with the Alps de Andalucía, would receive Official World Golf Ranking points at the minimum level of 4 points for the winner of a 54-hole event and 6 points for the winner of a 72-hole event.

== Schedule ==
The following table lists official events during the 2015 season.

Date	Tournament	Host country	Purse (€)	Winner (Note: The number in brackets after each winner's name is the number of Alps Tour events they had won up to and including that tournament. It is rare for someone to accumulate many wins on the Alps Tour as success at this level usually leads to promotion to the Challenge Tour.)	OWGR points
19 Feb	Red Sea El Ein Bay Open	Egypt	30,000	(France) Thomas Elissalde (2)	n/a
25 Feb	Red Sea Little Venice Open	Egypt	30,000	(France) Alexandre Widemann (1)	n/a
4 Mar	Dreamland Pyramids Open	Egypt	30,000	(England) Andrew Cooley (4)	n/a
4 Apr	Alps de Las Castillas	Spain	48,000	(Spain) Jesús Legarrea (2)	n/a
3 May	Tunisian Golf Open	Tunisia	70,000	(England) Josh Loughrey (1)	n/a
10 May	Gösser Open	Austria	40,000	(England) Harry Casey (1)	n/a
16 May	Open Colli Berici	Italy	40,000	(Italy) Enrico Di Nitto (1)	n/a
21 May	Open Frassanelle	Italy	40,000	(Spain) Gerard Piris (1)	n/a
31 May	Open de Saint François Region Guadeloupe	Guadeloupe	40,000	(Italy) Andrea Maestroni (3)	n/a
19 Jun	Open La Pinetina – Memorial Giorgio Bordoni	Italy	40,000	(Italy) Andrea Perrino (3)	n/a
28 Jun	Open International de la Mirabelle d'Or	France	45,000	(England) Harry Casey (2)	n/a
3 Jul	Flory van Donck Trophy	Belgium	40,000	(Italy) Federico Maccario (1)	n/a
17 Jul	Servizitalia Open	Italy	40,000	(France) Matthieu Pavon (2)	n/a
5 Sep	Alps de Andalucía	Spain	48,000	(Spain) Borja Etchart (3)	4
13 Sep	Citadelle Trophy International	France	45,000	(England) Josh Loughrey (2)	6
20 Sep	Open International du Haut Poitou	France	40,000	(Spain) Pep Anglès (1)	4
27 Sep	Open International du Marcilly	France	40,000	(Netherlands) Darius van Driel (1)	4
10 Oct	Alps de Extremadura	Spain	40,000	(Spain) Pol Bech (2)	4
18 Oct	Abruzzo Open	Italy	40,000	(Italy) Luca Cianchetti (a) (1)	4
25 Oct	Edmond de Rothschild Israel Masters	Israel	80,000	(Netherlands) Jurrian van der Vaart (1)	4

== Order of Merit ==
The Order of Merit was based on tournament results during the season, calculated using a points-based system. The top five players on the Order of Merit (not otherwise exempt) earned status to play on the 2016 Challenge Tour.

Position	Player	Points	Status earned
1	(Netherlands) Darius van Driel	35,860	Promoted to Challenge Tour
2	(England) Josh Loughrey	34,280	Qualified for Challenge Tour (made cut in Q School)
3	(France) Damien Perrier	28,099	Promoted to Challenge Tour
4	(England) Harry Casey	23,302	Promoted to Challenge Tour
5	(Netherlands) Jurrian van der Vaart	21,873	Promoted to Challenge Tour
6	(France) Matthieu Pavon	21,869	Qualified for Challenge Tour (made cut in Q School)
7	(Italy) Andrea Maestroni	21,297	Promoted to Challenge Tour
8	(Spain) Toni Ferrer	21,014	
9	(England) Tom Shadbolt	20,927	
10	(Spain) Gerard Piris	20,621	
