= Golf at the Summer World University Games =

Golf is an optional sport at the Universiade that has been held at the event four times since the first inception in Bangkok in 2007.

== Events ==
Event	07	11	15	17	27
Men's singles	•	•	•	•	•
Men's team	•	•	•	•	•
Women's singles	•	•	•	•	•
Women's team	•	•	•	•	•
Events	4	4	4	4	4

== Medalists ==
=== Men's individual ===
Games	Gold	Silver	Bronze
(Thailand) 2007 Bangkok	Ming-chuan Chen (TPE)	Charles Ford (GBR)	Yuki Usami (JPN)
(China) 2011 Shenzhen	Hideki Matsuyama (JPN)	Yoshinori Fujimoto (JPN)	Andrea Bolognesi (ITA)
(South Korea) 2015 Gwangju	Kazuki Higa (JPN)	Nicolas Platret (FRA)	Natipong Srithong (THA)
(Taiwan) 2017 Taipei	Raul Pereda de la Huerta (MEX)	Kazuki Higa (JPN)	Liu Yung-hua (TPE) Kevin Yu (TPE)

=== Women's individual ===
Games	Gold	Silver	Bronze
(Thailand) 2007 Bangkok	Danielle McVeigh (IRL)	Diana Cantú (MEX)	Hiroko Ayada (JPN)
(China) 2011 Shenzhen	Tzuchi Lin (TPE)	Katerina Ruzickova (CZE)	Ko Min Jeong (KOR)
(South Korea) 2015 Gwangju	Lee Jeong-eun (KOR)	Shina Kanazawa (JPN)	Sitanart Singhanart (THA)
(Taiwan) 2017 Taipei	Mariel Galdiano (USA)	Chen Hsuan (TPE) Hou Yu-sang (TPE)	not awarded

=== Men's team ===
Games	Gold	Silver	Bronze
(Thailand) 2007 Bangkok	Thailand (THA)	Mexico (MEX)	Japan (JPN)
(China) 2011 Shenzhen	Japan (JPN)	Italy (ITA)	Mexico (MEX)
(South Korea) 2015 Gwangju	Japan (JPN)	France (FRA)	South Korea (KOR)
(Taiwan) 2017 Taipei	Japan (JPN)	Mexico (MEX)	Chinese Taipei (TPE)

=== Women's team ===
Games	Gold	Silver	Bronze
(Thailand) 2007 Bangkok	Mexico (MEX)	Ireland (IRL)	United States (USA)
(China) 2011 Shenzhen	Chinese Taipei (TPE)	China (CHN)	United States (USA)
(South Korea) 2015 Gwangju	South Korea (KOR)	Japan (JPN)	United States (USA)
(Taiwan) 2017 Taipei	United States (USA)	Chinese Taipei (TPE)	South Korea (KOR)

== Medal table ==
Last updated after the 2017 Summer Universiade

Rank	Nation	Gold	Silver	Bronze	Total
1	Japan (JPN)	5	4	3	12
2	Chinese Taipei (TPE)	3	3	3	9
3	Mexico (MEX)	2	3	1	6
4	South Korea (KOR)	2	0	3	5
4	United States (USA)	2	0	3	5
6	Ireland (IRL)	1	1	0	2
7	Thailand (THA)	1	0	2	3
8	France (FRA)	0	2	0	2
9	Italy (ITA)	0	1	1	2
10	China (CHN)	0	1	0	1
10	Czech Republic (CZE)	0	1	0	1
10	Great Britain (GBR)	0	1	0	1
Totals (12 entries)		16	17	16	49
