= Alexander Björk =

Swedish professional golfer

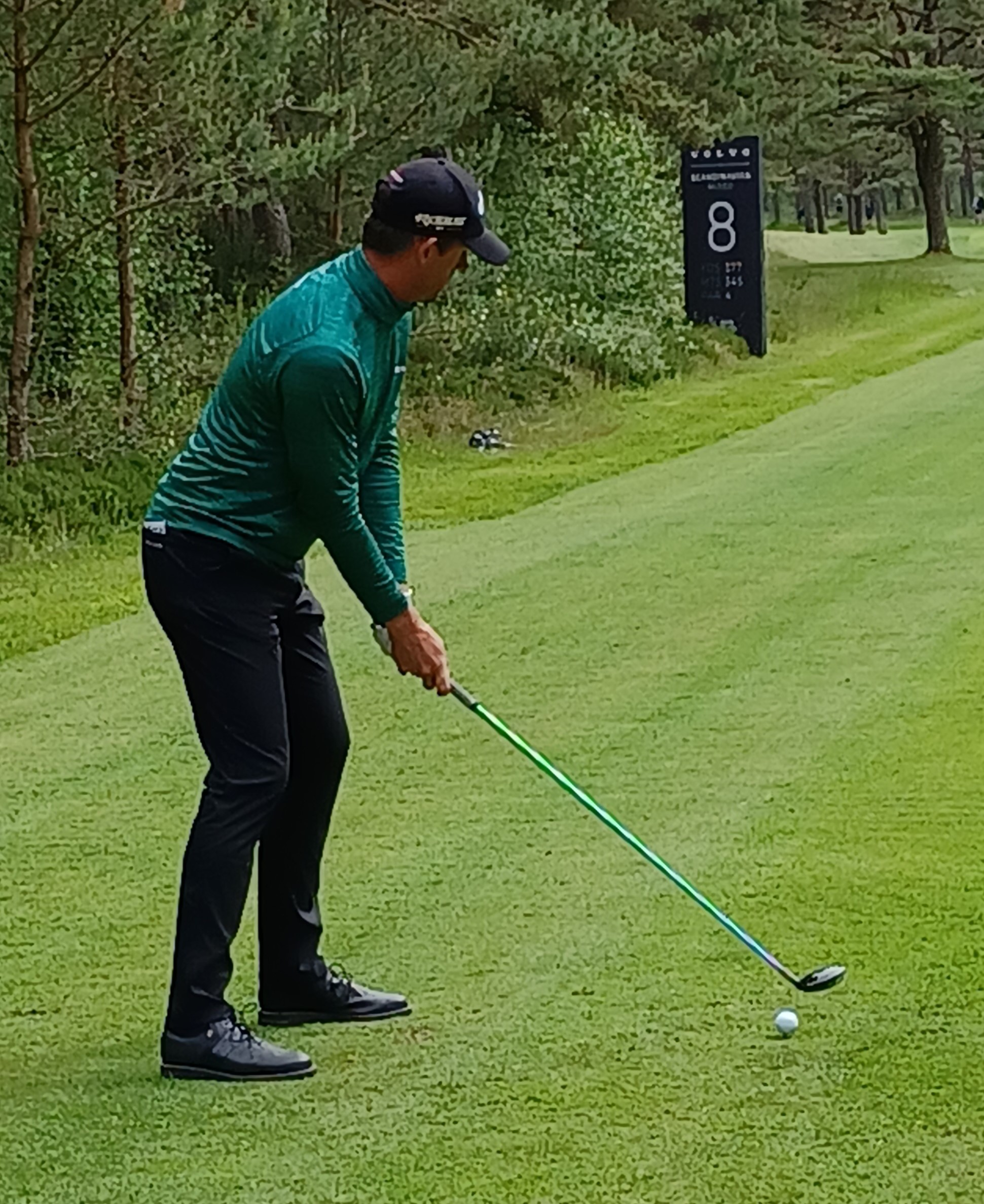
- Björk at the 2022 Volvo Car Scandinavian Mixed

Personal information
- Full name: Alexander Karl Mikael Björk
- Nationality: Sweden
- Born: 7 June 1990 (age 36) Växjö, Sweden
- Height: 1.85 m (6 ft 1 in)
- Weight: 76 kg (168 lb; 12.0 st)

Career
- Sport: Golf
- Turned professional: 2009
- Current tour: European Tour
- Former tours: PGA Tour; Challenge Tour; Nordic Golf League; Swedish Golf Tour
- Professional wins: 5
- Highest ranking: 59 (30 December 2018) (as of 25 October 2026)

Number of wins by tour
- European Tour: 1
- Asian Tour: 1
- Challenge Tour: 1
- Other: 3

Best results in major championships
- Masters Tournament: DNP
- PGA Championship: T39: 2024
- U.S. Open: DNP
- The Open Championship: T41: 2023

Alexander Karl Mikael Björk (born 7 June 1990) is a Swedish professional golfer who plays on the European Tour and PGA Tour. He won the 2018 Volvo China Open, and has recorded runner-up finishes at the UBS Hong Kong Open, British Masters, DP World Tour Championship, Ras Al Khaimah Championship and Omega European Masters. In 2023, he finished 5th in Race to Dubai Eligibility Ranking to receive a PGA Tour card.

== Professional career ==
Björk turned professional as a teenager in 2009 and joined the Swedish Golf Tour, where he won his first event as a professional, the Swedish PGA Championship, in his rookie season.

In 2012, Björk became the first golfer to list himself through Trade in Sports, an exchange for athletes, funding the launch of his professional career by pledging 10% of winnings to investors.

=== Challenge Tour ===
In 2013, he won the Arlandastad MoreGolf Open and finished 6th in the Nordic Golf League rankings to earn promotion to the Challenge Tour. His international break-through season came in 2016, where he won the Le Vaudreuil Golf Challenge in France and secured a card for the European Tour through a seventh place on the 2016 Challenge tour rankings. The season saw eight top-ten finishes including a tie for second at the Terre dei Consoli Open in Italy. He reached a rank of 181 on the Official World Golf Ranking.

=== European Tour ===
On the 2017 European Tour, Björk shared the lead with Peter Uihlein heading into the final round of Open de France, an Open Qualifying Series and Rolex Series event with a purse of US$7 million. He eventually finished tied for third, which earned him a spot at the 2017 Open Championship and saw him rise to 116 on the OWGR.

In the opening tournament of the 2018 European Tour, Björk shared the lead heading into the final round of UBS Hong Kong Open, but shot his second in the bunker on the final hole and missed a short putt for par and a playoff, finishing tied for second. In April 2018, the week after he finished third at Trophée Hassan II, Björk won his first European Tour title at the Volvo China Open in Beijing, moving into the top ten of the 2018 Race to Dubai rankings and a world ranking of 73. In October he was runner-up at the Sky Sports British Masters. He finished the season 19th in the Race to Dubai and with a career-high world rank of 59.

Björk made less of an impact in 2019 and 2020, but comfortably kept his card. He was tied for third at the Hero Open in England in August 2020, his best finish since 2018.

In 2021, Björk finished tied second with Matt Fitzpatrick at the DP World Tour Championship, Dubai, two shots behind winner Collin Morikawa, and advanced to 12th on the final 2021 Race to Dubai ranking.

During 2022, Björk surpassed €5 million in career earnings, but struggled with a back injury and missed the latter part of the season. After three months of rehab, he returned to tour for the 2023 UAE swing, where he finished joint runner-up at the Ras Al Khaimah Championship, one stroke behind Daniel Gavins, missing out on a playoff after a bogey on the final hole.

In September 2023, Björk was solo runner-up at the Omega European Masters, two strokes behind compatriot Ludvig Åberg who birdied four of the closing five holes to record his first win as a professional. He finished the season 11th in the Race to Dubai and 5th in PGA Tour Eligibility Ranking to receive a 2024 PGA Tour card.

=== PGA Tour ===
In his second PGA Tour start as a member, at The American Express, he shot an opening round of 64 to sit 2 strokes off the lead. He eventually finished tied 11th, which came to be his best PGA Tour finish of 2024. He made the cut 8 times in 16 starts to end the season 167th in the FedEx Cup standings, earning $414,659.

Björk announced his retirement from professional golf in September 2025.

== Awards and honors ==
In 2021, he received Elit Sign number 147 by the Swedish Golf Federation based on world ranking achievements.

== Professional wins (5) ==
=== European Tour wins (1) ===
No.	Date	Tournament	Winning score	Margin of victory	Runner-up
1	29 Apr 2018	Volvo China Open^{1}	−18 (66-72-67-65=270)	1 stroke	(Spain) Adrián Otaegui

^{1}Co-sanctioned by the Asian Tour

=== Challenge Tour wins (1) ===
No.	Date	Tournament	Winning score	Margin of victory	Runners-up
1	24 Jul 2016	Le Vaudreuil Golf Challenge	−14 (67-65-69-69=270)	1 stroke	(Australia) Nick Cullen, (England) Aaron Rai

=== Nordic Golf League wins (2) ===
No.	Date	Tournament	Winning score	Margin of victory	Runner-up
1	26 Sep 2009	PGA of Sweden National Open	−7 (74-65-70=209)	1 stroke	(Sweden) Joakim Renström
2	13 Sep 2013	Arlandastad MoreGolf Open	−12 (67-62-69=198)	3 strokes	(Sweden) Gustav Kocken

=== Other wins (1) ===
- 2015 Abbekås Open (Swedish Mini tour Future Series)

== Results in major championships ==
Results not in chronological order in 2020.

Tournament	2017	2018
Masters Tournament		
U.S. Open		
The Open Championship	CUT	CUT
PGA Championship		CUT

Tournament	2019	2020	2021	2022	2023	2024
Masters Tournament						
PGA Championship	CUT					T39
U.S. Open						
The Open Championship	CUT	NT		CUT	T41	CUT

Did not play

CUT = missed the half-way cut
"T" = tied
NT = No tournament due to the COVID-19 pandemic

== Results in World Golf Championships ==
Tournament	2018	2019
Championship		T39
Match Play		
Invitational	T48	
Champions	T28	

Did not play

"T" = tied

== Team appearances ==
Professional

- World Cup (representing Sweden): 2018

== See also ==
- 2016 Challenge Tour graduates
- 2023 Race to Dubai dual card winners
