= Dylan Frittelli =

South African professional golfer (born 1990)

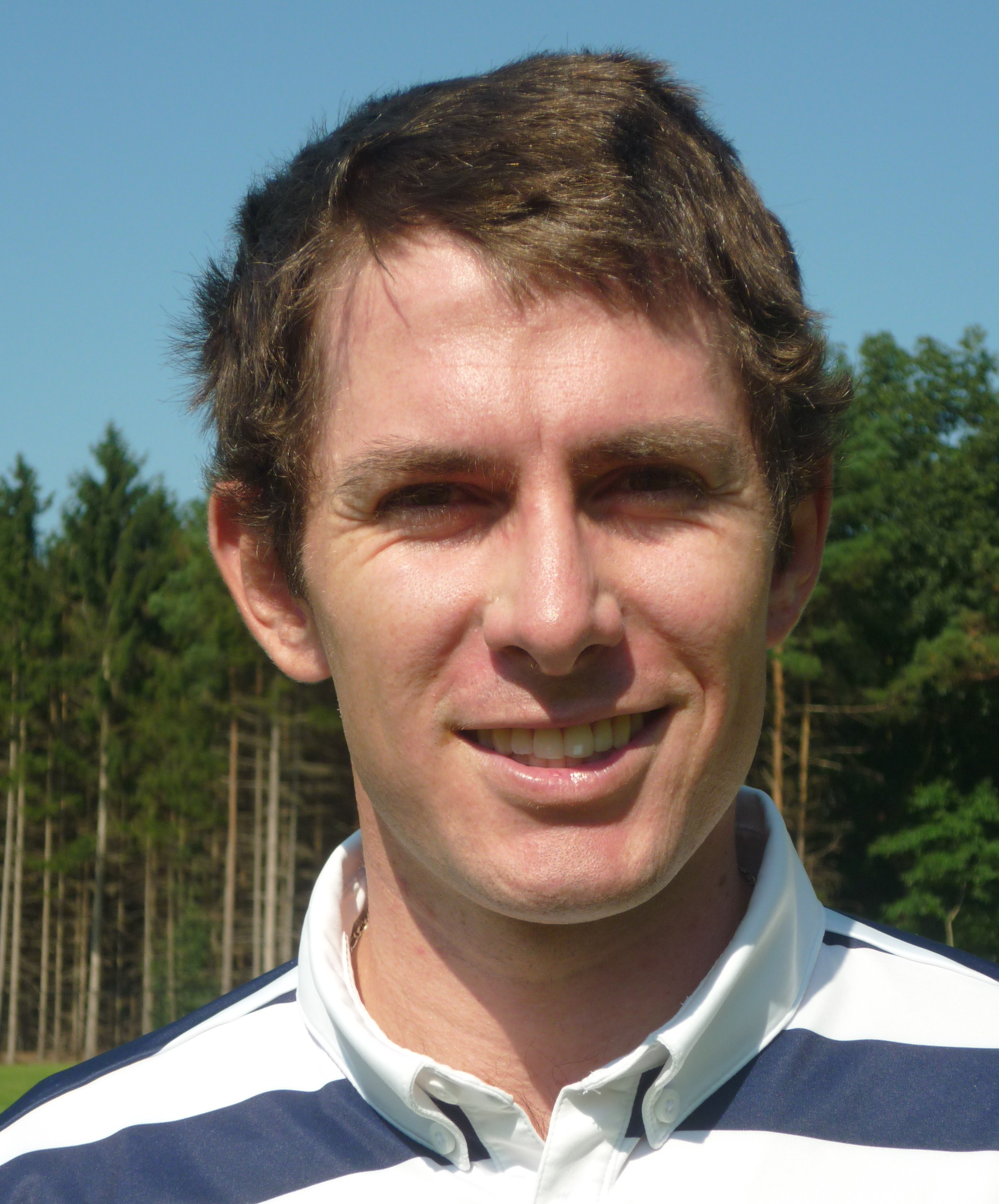

Personal information
- Full name: Dylan Ashley Frittelli
- Nationality: South Africa
- Born: 5 June 1990 (age 36) Johannesburg, South Africa
- Height: 1.87 m (6 ft 2 in)
- Weight: 81 kg (179 lb; 12.8 st)

Career
- Sport: Golf
- College: University of Texas
- Turned professional: 2012
- Current tours: PGA Tour; European Tour; Sunshine Tour
- Former tour: Challenge Tour
- Professional wins: 7
- Highest ranking: 44 (25 February 2018)

Number of wins by tour
- PGA Tour: 1
- European Tour: 3
- Asian Tour: 1
- Sunshine Tour: 1
- Challenge Tour: 2
- Other: 1

Best results in major championships
- Masters Tournament: T5: 2020
- PGA Championship: T31: 2018
- U.S. Open: T46: 2021
- The Open Championship: 5th: 2021

Achievements and awards
- Sunshine Tour Rookie of the Year: 2013
- European Tour Graduate of the Year: 2017

Dylan Ashley Frittelli (born 5 June 1990) is a South African professional golfer. He currently plays on the PGA Tour where he won the John Deere Classic in 2019. He previously played on the European Tour where he won twice in 2017, the Lyoness Open and the AfrAsia Bank Mauritius Open.

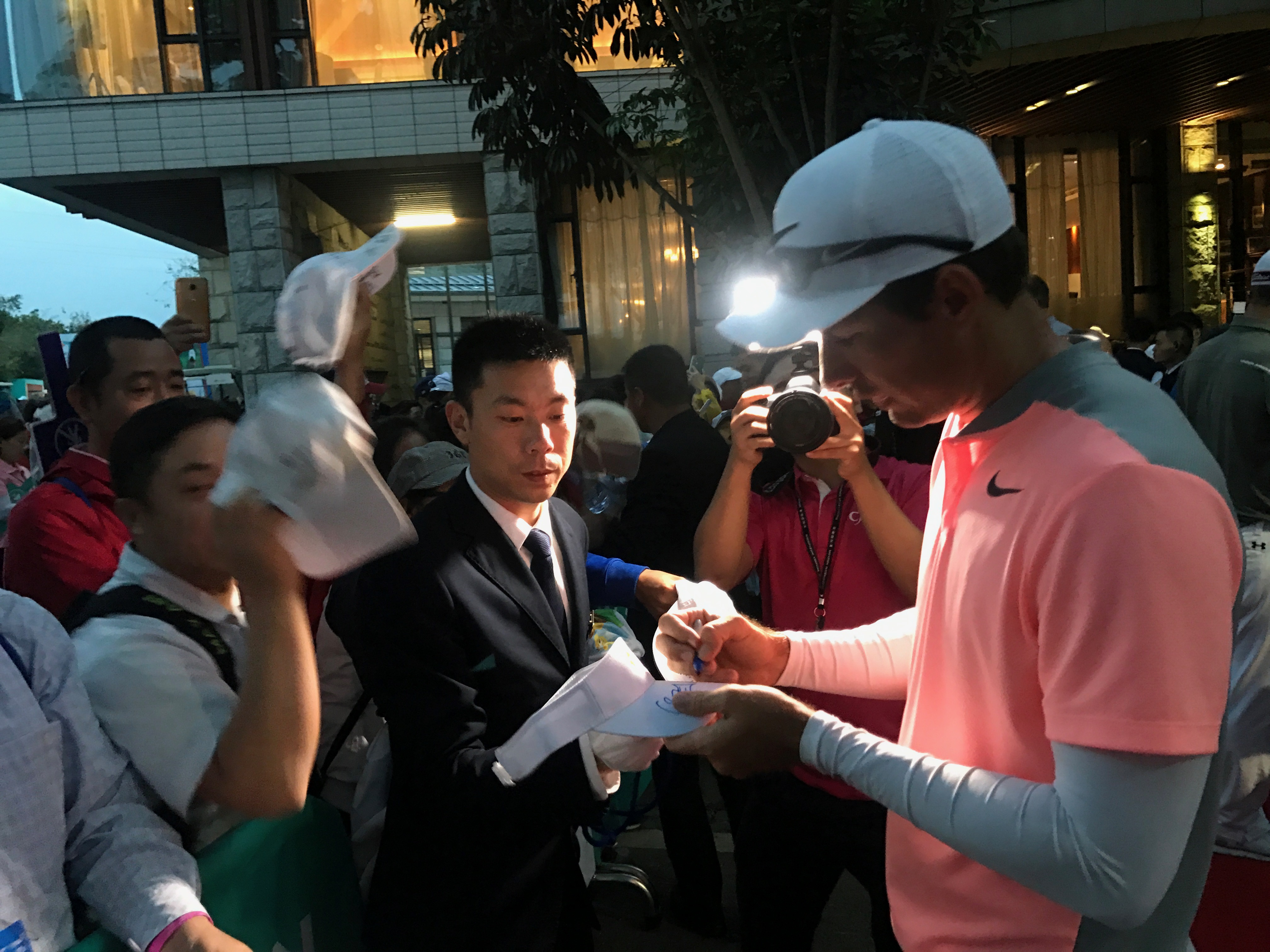
Frittelli at the 2017 Shenzhen International

== Amateur career ==
Frittelli won the 2007 Callaway Junior World Golf Championships for boys aged 15 to 17.

Frittelli played college golf at the University of Texas, where he won the decisive match to lead his team to victory at the 2012 NCAA Championship. He represented South Africa in the Eisenhower Trophy in 2008 and 2010.

== Professional career ==
Frittelli turned professional after the 2012 NCAA Championship and played on the European Tour via sponsors exemptions for the rest of the year. He started 2013 with a second-place finish in the Telkom PGA Championship behind Jaco van Zyl. He played most of the year on the Challenge Tour, winning his first tour event at the Kärnten Golf Open in June.

Frittelli's performances in early 2013 lifted him into the world top-300 but he then had two years of poor performances, dropping to 926 in the world rankings. He showed a return to form when losing a playoff for the Australian PGA Championship in late 2015. 2016 was a successful year with second place in the Golden Pilsener Zimbabwe Open, a tie for second in the Tayto Northern Ireland Open and then a second win on the Challenge Tour in the Rolex Trophy. He finished 8th in the Race to Oman rankings to earn a place on the 2017 European Tour.

In 2017 a tie for second place in the Eye of Africa PGA Championship and a playoff defeat in the Volvo China Open lifted Frittelli into the world top-100 for the first time. In June he won his first European Tour event, the Lyoness Open. At the end of the season he was runner-up in the Turkish Airlines Open and tied for 4th in the end-of-season DP World Tour Championship, Dubai, both Rolex Series events. He finished 19th in the Race to Dubai.

Frittelli won the AfrAsia Bank Mauritius Open in December 2017 beating Arjun Atwal at the first hole of a playoff.

In 2018, Frittelli played some PGA Tour events because of sponsor's exemptions and his world ranking. He earned enough points to qualify for the Web.com Tour Finals. At the Web.com Tour Finals, he secured his PGA Tour card for the 2018–19 season.

Fritelli won the John Deere Classic in July 2019 by shooting 21-under par. It was his maiden PGA Tour victory and qualified him for the 2019 Open Championship in Northern Ireland.

After finishing 172nd on the 2023 FedEx Cup rankings and losing his playing rights on the PGA Tour, Frittelli gained entry to the 2024 European Tour, through a new exemption category (for players in positions 126-200 on the PGA Tour rankings the year before) and won the 2024 Bahrain Championship, his first European Tour victory in six years.

== Amateur wins ==
- 2007 Callaway Junior World Golf Championships
- 2008 South African Boys' Championship

== Professional wins (7) ==
=== PGA Tour wins (1) ===
No.	Date	Tournament	Winning score	Margin of victory	Runner-up
1	14 Jul 2019	John Deere Classic	−21 (66-68-65-64=263)	2 strokes	(United States) Russell Henley

=== European Tour wins (3) ===
No.	Date	Tournament	Winning score	Margin of victory	Runner(s)-up
1	11 Jun 2017	Lyoness Open	−12 (70-71-68-67=276)	1 stroke	(England) David Horsey, (Finland) Mikko Korhonen, (South Africa) Jbe' Kruger
2	3 Dec 2017 (2018 season)	AfrAsia Bank Mauritius Open^{1}	−16 (67-66-68-67=268)	Playoff	(India) Arjun Atwal
3	4 Feb 2024	Bahrain Championship	−13 (67-68-69-71=275)	2 strokes	(South Africa) Zander Lombard, (Sweden) Jesper Svensson

^{1}Co-sanctioned by the Asian Tour and the Sunshine Tour

European Tour playoff record (1–2)

No.	Year	Tournament	Opponent(s)	Result
1	2015	Australian PGA Championship	(Australia) Nathan Holman, (United States) Harold Varner III	Holman won with par on first extra hole
2	2017	Volvo China Open	(France) Alexander Lévy	Lost to birdie on first extra hole
3	2017	AfrAsia Bank Mauritius Open	(India) Arjun Atwal	Won with birdie on first extra hole

=== Asian Tour wins (1) ===
No.	Date	Tournament	Winning score	Margin of victory	Runner-up
1	3 Dec 2017	AfrAsia Bank Mauritius Open^{1}	−16 (67-66-68-67=268)	Playoff	(India) Arjun Atwal

^{1}Co-sanctioned by the European Tour and the Sunshine Tour

Asian Tour playoff record (1–0)

No.	Year	Tournament	Opponent	Result
1	2017	AfrAsia Bank Mauritius Open	(India) Arjun Atwal	Won with birdie on first extra hole

=== Sunshine Tour wins (1) ===
No.	Date	Tournament	Winning score	Margin of victory	Runner-up
1	3 Dec 2017	AfrAsia Bank Mauritius Open^{1}	−16 (67-66-68-67=268)	Playoff	(India) Arjun Atwal

^{1}Co-sanctioned by the European Tour and the Asian Tour

Sunshine Tour playoff record (1–1)

No.	Year	Tournament	Opponent(s)	Result
1	2017	Eye of Africa PGA Championship	(South Africa) Makhetha Mazibuko, (South Africa) Erik van Rooyen	van Rooyen won with birdie on first extra hole
2	2017	AfrAsia Bank Mauritius Open	(India) Arjun Atwal	Won with birdie on first extra hole

=== Challenge Tour wins (2) ===
No.	Date	Tournament	Winning score	Margin of victory	Runners-up
1	30 Jun 2013	Kärnten Golf Open	−17 (67-64-65-71=267)	3 strokes	(Italy) Filippo Bergamaschi, (Netherlands) Daan Huizing
2	20 Aug 2016	Rolex Trophy	−20 (71-65-66-66=268)	2 strokes	(Spain) Pep Anglès, (New Zealand) Ryan Fox

=== Big Easy Tour wins (1) ===
No.	Date	Tournament	Winning score	Margin of victory	Runner-up
1	10 Apr 2013	Roodepoort CC	−12 (65-67=132)	3 strokes	(South Africa) Callie Swart

== Results in major championships ==
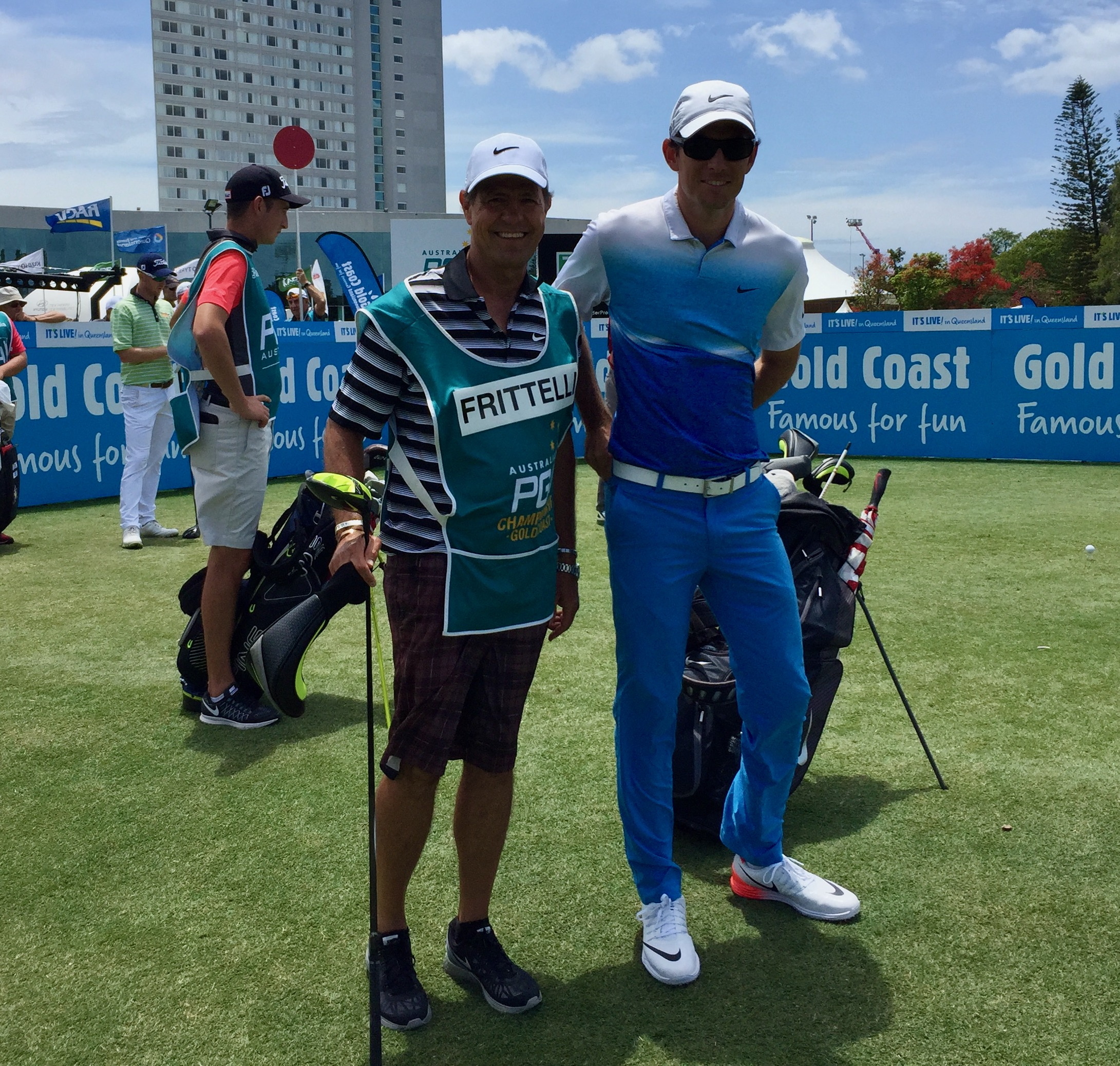
Dylan Fritelli and Greg Frittelli -Australian PGA Championship 2015

Results not in chronological order in 2020.

Tournament	2017	2018
Masters Tournament		CUT
U.S. Open		CUT
The Open Championship	CUT	CUT
PGA Championship	T63	T31

Tournament	2019	2020	2021	2022
Masters Tournament		T5	CUT	
PGA Championship	CUT	T33	CUT	
U.S. Open			T46	
The Open Championship	T32	NT	5	T28

Top 10
Did not play

CUT = missed the half-way cut
"T" = tied
NT = No tournament due to COVID-19 pandemic

== Results in The Players Championship ==
Tournament	2021	2022	2023
The Players Championship	T22	T50	CUT

CUT = missed the halfway cut
"T" indicates a tie for a place

== Results in World Golf Championships ==
Tournament	2018	2019	2020	2021
Championship	T55			
Match Play	T36		NT^{1}	R16
Invitational				
Champions			NT^{1}	NT^{1}

^{1}Cancelled due to COVID-19 pandemic

Top 10
Did not play

"T" = tied
QF, R16, R32, R64 = Round in which player lost in match play
NT = No tournament

== Team appearances ==
Amateur

- Eisenhower Trophy (representing South Africa): 2008, 2010

Professional

- World Cup (representing South Africa): 2018

== See also ==
- 2016 Challenge Tour graduates
- 2018 Web.com Tour Finals graduates
