= Joël Stalter =

French golfer

Personal information
- Nationality: France
- Born: 8 July 1992 (age 34) Thionville, France
- Height: 1.73 m (5 ft 8 in)
- Weight: 68 kg (150 lb; 10.7 st)

Career
- Sport: Golf
- College: University of California, Berkeley
- Turned professional: 2014
- Current tour: Asian Tour
- Former tours: European Tour; Challenge Tour
- Professional wins: 3

Number of wins by tour
- European Tour: 1
- Challenge Tour: 2
- Other: 1

Best results in major championships
- Masters Tournament: DNP
- PGA Championship: DNP
- U.S. Open: CUT: 2017
- The Open Championship: DNP

Joël Stalter (born 8 July 1992) is a French professional golfer.

Stalter played college golf at the University of California, Berkeley where he was a two-time All-American and won five tournaments. He represented Europe in the 2013 Palmer Cup.

== Professional career ==
Stalter turned professional after graduating in 2014 and began playing on the Challenge Tour. He earned his first victory at the 2016 Swedish Challenge. Stalter finished 16th in the Challenge Tour Road to Oman to earn a place on the European Tour for 2017.

In July 2020, Stalter won the Euram Bank Open. This was a dual-ranking event and gave him his first victory on the European Tour.

== Amateur wins ==
- 2011 Austrian Amateur
- 2013 Arizona Intercollegiate, John Burns Intercollegiate, Alister MacKenzie Invitational
- 2014 Arizona Intercollegiate, National Invitational Tournament

== Professional wins (3) ==
=== European Tour wins (1) ===
| No. | Date | Tournament | Winning score | Margin of victory | Runner-up |
|---|---|---|---|---|---|
| 1 | 18 Jul 2020 | Euram Bank Open^{1} | −14 (65-65-68-68-266) | 2 strokes | (England) Richard Mansell |

^{1}Dual-ranking event with the Challenge Tour

=== Challenge Tour wins (2) ===
| No. | Date | Tournament | Winning score | Margin of victory | Runner(s)-up |
|---|---|---|---|---|---|
| 1 | 7 Aug 2016 | Swedish Challenge | −12 (70-69-69-68-276) | Playoff | (Wales) Oliver Farr, (England) Ben Stow |
| 2 | 18 Jul 2020 | Euram Bank Open^{1} | −14 (65-65-68-68-266) | 2 strokes | (England) Richard Mansell |

^{1}Dual-ranking event with the European Tour

Challenge Tour playoff record (1–0)

| No. | Year | Tournament | Opponents | Result |
|---|---|---|---|---|
| 1 | 2016 | Swedish Challenge | (Wales) Oliver Farr, (England) Ben Stow | Won with birdie on second extra hole |

=== French Tour wins (1) ===
| No. | Date | Tournament | Winning score | Margin of victory | Runners-up |
|---|---|---|---|---|---|
| 1 | 24 Nov 2016 | Open Mercedes-Benz La Reunion (with (France) David Antonelli) | −20 (65-66-65-196) | 4 strokes | (France) Nelson da Silva Ramos and (France) Victor Perez |

== Results in major championships ==
| Tournament | 2017 |
|---|---|
| Masters Tournament | |
| U.S. Open | CUT |
| The Open Championship | |
| PGA Championship | |

Did not play

CUT = missed the halfway cut
"T" = tied

== Team appearances ==
- European Boys' Team Championship (representing France): 2008
- Palmer Cup (representing Europe): 2013
- European Amateur Team Championship (representing France): 2013

== See also ==
- 2016 Challenge Tour graduates
- 2022 European Tour Qualifying School graduates
