= Frank Kennedy (golfer) =

English professional golfer (born 2005)

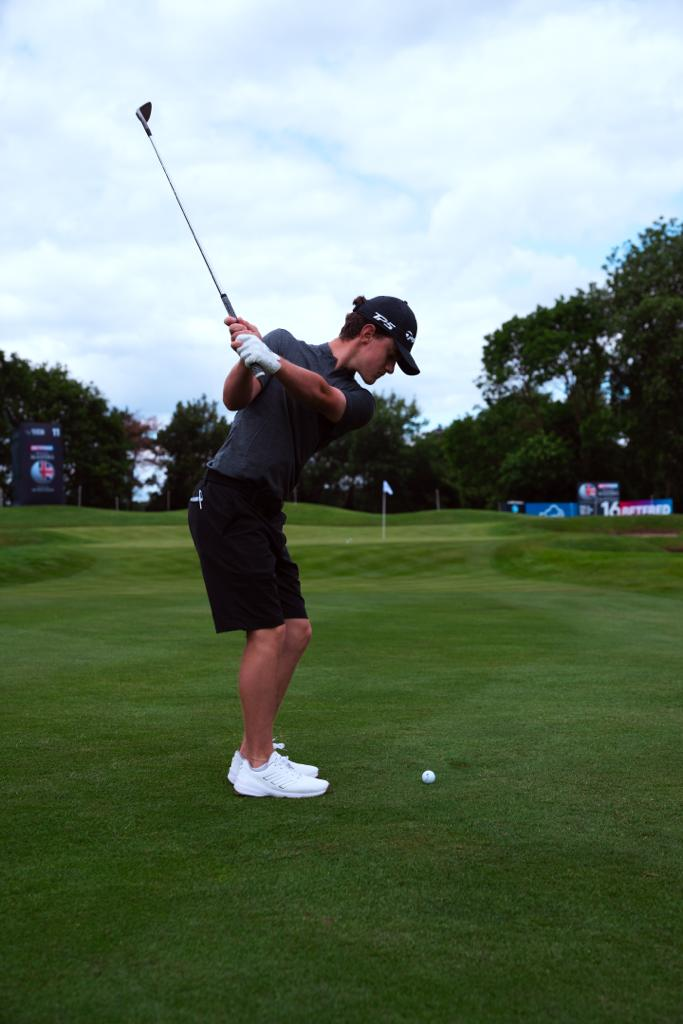
- Kennedy at the British Masters in 2023.

Personal information
- Nationality: England
- Born: 2 October 2005 (age 21)

Career
- Sport: Golf
- Turned professional: 2023
- Current tour: Challenge Tour
- Professional wins: 1

Number of wins by tour
- Challenge Tour: 1

Frank Kennedy (born 2 October 2005) is an English professional golfer who currently plays on the Challenge Tour, where he won the 2024 Euram Bank Open. Prior to turning professional in 2023, aged 17, he won the 2022 Portuguese International Amateur Championship and the 2023 Lytham Trophy. In 2021, aged 15, he became the youngest player from Great Britain & Ireland to make the cut at a European Tour event at the Hero Open.

== Amateur career ==
Kennedy's first significant victory came in the 2016 Doral Publix Junior Classic in the 10/11 age group at Trump National Doral, in Miami, Florida. He won the U. S. Kids Golf British Championship in consecutive years in 2016 and 2017. He won the Wee Wonders Grand Final at St Andrews Scotland in 2018. In 2019, aged 13, he won the Irish U14 Open Championship and was runner-up in the Irish U16 Open Championship in the same year. In 2020, he won the Junior Honda Classic at PGA National Resort in Florida. Kennedy became a member of the England Golf boys squad and within 12 months graduated to the men's squad aged 15 years. In 2021, he won the George Henriques Salver award for the highest placed Great Britain & Ireland player under the age of 20 in the Brabazon Trophy (aged 15). In 2022, he became the youngest winner of the Portuguese International Amateur Championship with a championship record score of 19 under par. In 2022, he was a member of the England Golf boys squad that took the silver medal in the European Boys' Team Championship at Golf Club St. Leon-Rot, Germany and later that year represented Great Britain & Ireland in the Jacques Léglise Trophy.

In 2023, Kennedy won the Lytham Trophy, becoming the joint youngest winner in the tournament's history aged 17. He took third place The Amateur Championship in 2023 after losing to the eventual winner. He turned professional at age 17, ranked 41st in the World Amateur Golf Ranking.

== Professional career ==
Kennedy made his professional debut at the 2023 British Masters at The Belfry and made the cut, eventually finishing in 65th place. During 2023, he played on the Challenge Tour, European Tour and Asian Tour and achieved his first top-10 finish when he placed 7th at the Australian PGA Championship at Royal Queensland Golf Club aged 18 years.

In 2024, Kennedy secured his first victory as a professional after winning the Euram Bank Open on the Challenge Tour, making him the third youngest winner in Challenge Tour history.

During Final Stage of European Tour Q-school in 2026, Kennedy was disqualified after 72 holes due to damaging a green.

== Coaches and mentors ==
Kennedy spends a lot of time in Florida at his Jupiter base where he is coached by Brad Faxon and Jim McLean.

== Amateur wins ==
- 2022 Portuguese International Amateur Championship
- 2023 Lytham Trophy

== Professional wins (1) ==
=== Challenge Tour wins (1) ===
No.	Date	Tournament	Winning score	Margin of victory	Runner-up
1	21 Jul 2024	Euram Bank Open	−13 (65-66-65-71=267)	1 stroke	(Germany) Nicolai von Dellingshausen

== Team appearances ==
- European Boys' Team Championship (representing England): 2022
- Jacques Léglise Trophy (representing Great Britain & Ireland): 2022
