= 2024 Alps Tour =

Golf tour season

2024 Alps Tour season
- Duration: 20 February 2024 – 18 October 2024
- Number of official events: 16
- Most wins: (France) Théo Boulet (2) (United States) Brandon Kewalramani (2)
- Order of Merit: (France) Benjamin Kédochim

The 2024 Alps Tour was the 24th season of the Alps Tour, a third-tier golf tour recognised by the European Tour.

== Schedule ==
The following table lists official events during the 2024 season.

Date	Tournament	Host country	Purse (€)	Winner (Note: The number in brackets after each winner's name is the number of Alps Tour events they had won up to and including that tournament. It is rare for someone to accumulate many wins on the Alps Tour as success at this level usually leads to promotion to the Challenge Tour.)	OWGR points
22 Feb	Ein Bay Open	Egypt	40,000	(France) Aymeric Laussot (1)	0.68
27 Feb	Red Sea Little Venice Open	Egypt	40,000	(Spain) José A. Sintes Navarro (a) (1)	0.73
3 Mar	New Giza Open	Egypt	40,000	(Italy) Edoardo Lipparelli (2)	0.68
27 Apr	Tunisian Golf Open	Tunisia	45,000	(Italy) Gianmaria Rean Trinchero (2)	0.83
10 May	Memorial Giorgio Bordoni	Italy	40,000	(Italy) Mattia Comotti (1)	0.84
18 May	Gösser Open	Austria	40,000	(Austria) Maximilian Steinlechner (1)	0.98
25 May	Lacanau Alps Open	France	45,000	(France) Antoine Auboin (1)	0.84
31 May	Alps de Roquetas de Mar	Spain	40,000	(United States) Brandon Kewalramani (1)	0.86
16 Jun	Open de la Mirabelle d'Or	France	40,000	(France) Théo Boulet (1)	0.84
29 Jun	Aravell Golf Andorra Open	Spain	40,000	(France) Théo Boulet (2)	0.76
5 Jul	Alps de Andalucía	Spain	40,000	(United States) Brandon Kewalramani (2)	0.82
13 Jul	Alps de Las Castillas	Spain	40,000	(Spain) Albert Boneta (a) (1)	0.91
7 Sep	Longwy Alps Open	France	45,000	(France) Damien Perrier (2)	0.84
14 Sep	Hauts de France – Pas de Calais Golf Open	France	40,000	(Spain) Mario Galiano (1)	0.89
12 Oct	Croara Alps Open	Italy	40,000	(Spain) Alejandro Aguilera (1)	0.91
18 Oct	Alps Tour Grand Final	Italy	50,000	(Italy) Enrico Di Nitto (3)	0.80

== Order of Merit ==
The Order of Merit was based on tournament results during the season, calculated using a points-based system. The top five players on the Order of Merit (not otherwise exempt) earned status to play on the 2025 Challenge Tour (HotelPlanner Tour).

Position	Player	Points	Status earned
1	(France) Benjamin Kédochim	28,119	Promoted to Challenge Tour
2	(Italy) Enrico Di Nitto	25,794	Promoted to Challenge Tour
3	(United States) Brandon Kewalramani	23,495	Promoted to Challenge Tour
4	(France) Damien Perrier	20,801	Promoted to Challenge Tour
5	(Netherlands) Vince van Veen	20,555	Qualified for Challenge Tour (made cut in Q School)
6	(France) Aymeric Laussot	17,979	Promoted to Challenge Tour
7	(France) Théo Boulet	16,982	
8	(Italy) Edoardo Lipparelli	16,495	
9	(Spain) Mario Galiano	15,855	
10	(Italy) Jacopo Vecchi Fossa	15,350	
