= Euram Bank Open =

Coordinates: 48.000°N 15.480°E

Interwetten Open
Tournament information
- Location: Oberhaus, Austria
- Established: 2018
- Course: Schladming-Dachstein Golf Club
- Par: 69
- Length: 6,438 yards (5,887 m)
- Tours: Challenge Tour; European Tour (2020)
- Format: Stroke play
- Prize fund: €300,000
- Month played: June

Tournament record score
- Aggregate: 255 Maximilian Steinlechner (2025)
- To par: −21 as above

Current champion
- (Czech Republic) Filip Mrůzek

Location map
- Location in Austria

The Euram Bank Open is a golf tournament on the Challenge Tour. It was first played in July 2018 at Golf Club Adamstal in Ramsau, Austria. Adamstal previously hosted the MAN NÖ Open on the Challenge Tour from 2006 to 2008.

== History ==
The tournament was founded in 2018 and was first played at Golf Club Adamstal, which remained the venue every year until 2025.

In 2020, the tournament became a dual ranking event with the European Tour, due to revamp of the European and Challenge Tour's schedules because of the COVID-19 pandemic. Joël Stalter won the tournament, beating Richard Mansell by two shots.

In 2025, the tournament gained a new sponsor in Interwetten, being renamed as the Interwetten Open and moved from Golf Club Adamstal to Schladming-Dachstein Golf Club in Schladming.

== Winners ==
Year	Tour(s) (Note: CHA − Challenge Tour; EUR − European Tour.)	Winner	Score	To par	Margin of victory	Runner(s)-up
Interwetten Open
2026	CHA	(Czech Republic) Filip Mrůzek	258	−18	1 stroke	(South Africa) Louis Albertse
2025	CHA	(Austria) Maximilian Steinlechner	255	−21	2 strokes	(Italy) Filippo Celli
Euram Bank Open
2024	CHA	(England) Frank Kennedy	267	−13	1 stroke	(Germany) Nicolai von Dellingshausen
2023	CHA	(South Africa) Casey Jarvis	262	−18	1 stroke	(Scotland) Euan Walker
2022	CHA	(Germany) Marc Hammer	270	−10	2 strokes	(France) Pierre Pineau
2021	CHA	(Wales) Stuart Manley	262	−18	1 stroke	(Scotland) Ewen Ferguson
2020	CHA, EUR	(France) Joël Stalter	266	−14	2 strokes	(England) Richard Mansell
2019	CHA	(Scotland) Calum Hill	262	−18	4 strokes	(Scotland) Ewen Ferguson (Portugal) José-Filipe Lima
2018	CHA	(Netherlands) Darius van Driel	263	−17	1 stroke	(Scotland) David Law
