= Lalla Aïcha Challenge Tour =

Tournament information
- Location: Rabat, Morocco
- Established: 2019
- Course: Royal Golf Dar Es Salam
- Par: 72
- Length: 7,002 yards (6,403 m)
- Tour: Challenge Tour
- Format: Stroke play
- Prize fund: €200,000
- Month played: October
- Final year: 2019

Tournament record score
- Aggregate: 273 Oliver Farr (2019)
- To par: −15 as above

Final champion
- (Wales) Oliver Farr

Location map
- Location in Morocco

The Lalla Aïcha Challenge Tour is a golf tournament on the Challenge Tour. It was first played in October 2019 at Royal Golf Dar Es Salam, Rabat, Morocco. It was the first Challenge Tour event to be played in Morocco since the 2010 Moroccan Golf Classic The inaugural event was won by Oliver Farr. Farr started the final day 4 strokes behind the leaders but had a final round 63 to win by 3 shots.

== Winners ==
Year	Winner	Score	To par	Margin of victory	Runner-up
2020	Cancelled due to COVID-19 pandemic				
2019	(Wales) Oliver Farr	273	−15	3 strokes	(England) Jack Senior
