= Charlie Ford (golfer) =

English golfer (born 1985)

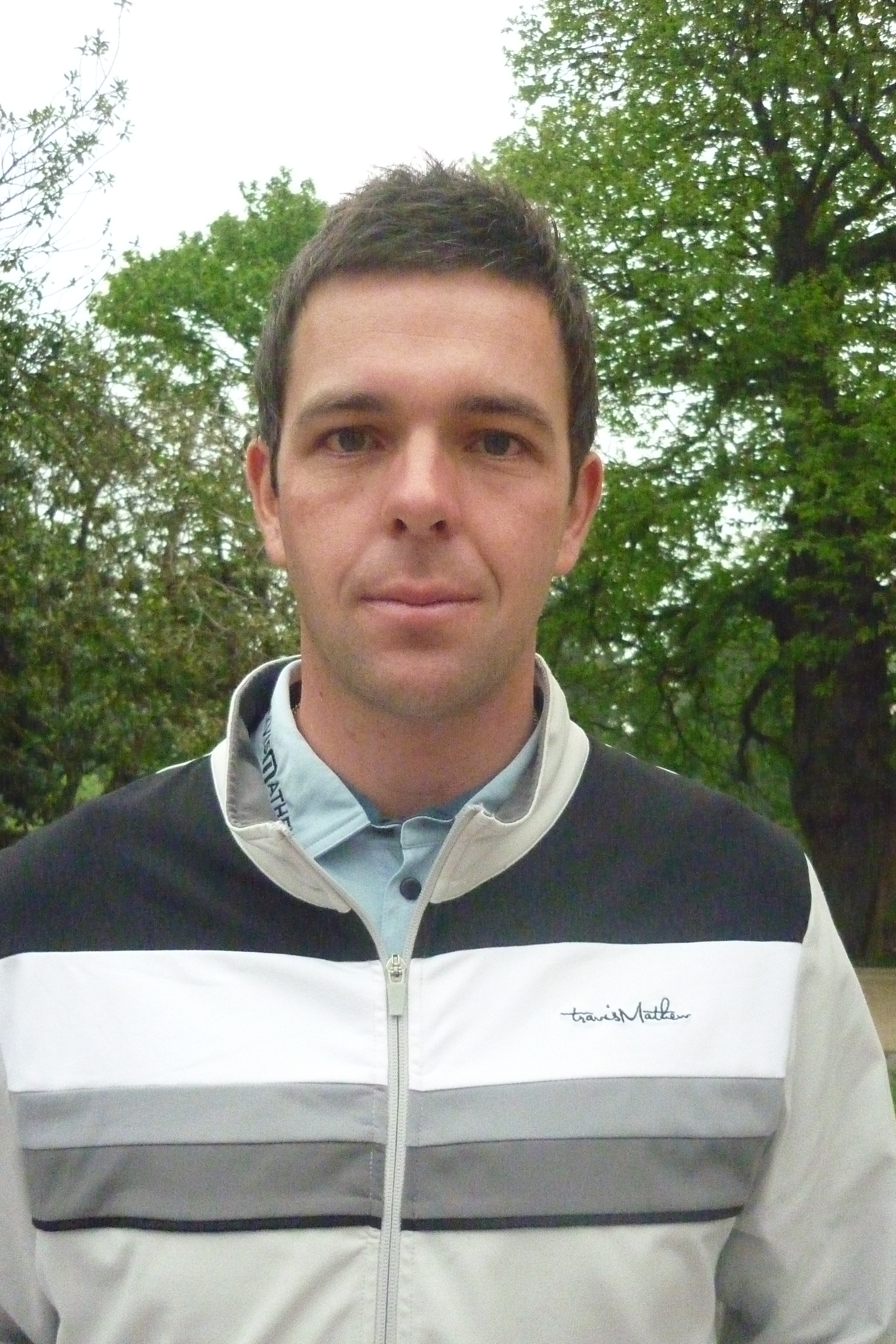

Personal information
- Full name: Charles Philip Ford
- Nationality: England
- Born: 1 May 1985 (age 41) Leicester, England
- Height: 6 ft 4 in (1.93 m)

Career
- Sport: Golf
- College: University of Tennessee
- Turned professional: 2009
- Current tour: European Tour
- Former tour: Challenge Tour
- Professional wins: 1

Number of wins by tour
- Challenge Tour: 1
Medal record
Representing Great Britain
Summer Universiade
Silver medal – second place	2007 Bangkok	Individual

Charles Philip Ford (born 1 May 1985) is an English professional golfer who currently plays on the European Tour.

== Career ==
In 1985, Ford was born in Leicester, England. Ford attended the University of Tennessee in the United States.

In 2009, he turned professional. He qualified for the second tier Challenge Tour for the 2010 season by reaching the final stage of qualifying school at the end of 2009. He quickly made an impact by winning in his second appearance on the tour, at the Turkish Airlines Challenge, edging out Oscar Florén in a playoff. Ford played on the Challenge Tour from 2010 to 2017. 2017 was his most successful since 2010 and he finished 28th in the Order of Merit. He finished tied for second place at the 2017 European Tour qualifying school to earn his place on the 2018 European Tour.

== Professional wins (1) ==
=== Challenge Tour wins (1) ===
No.	Date	Tournament	Winning score	Margin of victory	Runner-up
1	2 May 2010	Turkish Airlines Challenge	−11 (73-68-66-70=277)	Playoff	(Sweden) Oscar Florén

Challenge Tour playoff record (1–0)

No.	Year	Tournament	Opponent	Result
1	2010	Turkish Airlines Challenge	(Sweden) Oscar Florén	Won with birdie on first extra hole

== Team appearances ==
Amateur

- Palmer Cup (representing Europe): 2008 (winners)
- European Amateur Team Championship (representing England): 2008, 2009

Professional

- European Championships (representing Great Britain): 2018

== See also ==
- 2017 European Tour Qualifying School graduates
