= Darius van Driel =

Dutch golfer

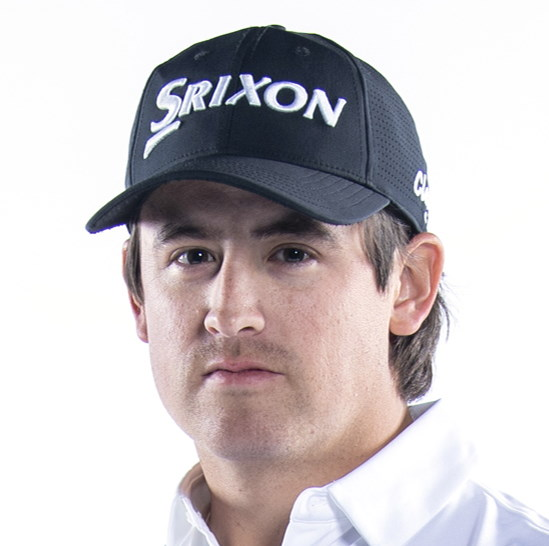
- van Driel in January 2020

Personal information
- Full name: Darius Arjen Joel van Driel
- Nationality: Netherlands
- Born: 2 June 1989 (age 37) Leidschendam, Netherlands
- Height: 1.72 m (5 ft 8 in)
- Weight: 75 kg (165 lb)

Career
- Sport: Golf
- Turned professional: 2015
- Current tour: European Tour
- Former tours: Challenge Tour; Alps Tour
- Professional wins: 7

Number of wins by tour
- European Tour: 1
- Challenge Tour: 2
- Other: 4

Achievements and awards
- NGF Young Talent of the Year: 2015
- Alps Tour Order of Merit winner: 2015
- Dutch Golfer of the Year: 2019

Darius Arjen Joel van Driel (born 2 June 1989) is a Dutch professional golfer who plays on the European Tour.

== Amateur career ==
Born in Leidschendam, Netherlands, van Driel took up golf at the age of 11. His junior and amateur career, up to and including 2014, saw him win the Dutch National Strokeplay Championship under-19 (2007) and under-22 (2010).

He also won the 2008 Dutch National Strokeplay Championship, which earned him entry to that year's KLM Dutch Open where he missed the cut (+11) but finished as second Dutch amateur player.

He was selected as a member of the Dutch team for the European Amateur Team Championship in 2007 and 2010. Also during this period he took some time away from the game to complete a bachelor's degree in Economics and Sports Marketing at the Johan Cruyff Institute in Amsterdam.

In 2013 he won the Dutch National Matchplay Championship. and in 2014, his last year as an amateur, he finished second at the Lytham Trophy and was again selected as a member of the Dutch team for the European Amateur Team Championship. He ended his amateur career by taking second place in the qualifying school for the 2015 season of the Alps Tour, one of the European third-tier professional tours.

== Professional career ==
=== 2015–2019 ===
In 2015, his first year as a professional golfer, van Driel competed in the Alps Tour. With one victory, and five 2nd places he won the overall Alps Tour Order of Merit. and gained automatic entry to the 2016 Challenge Tour.

In 2016, van Driel finished 34th in the 2016 Challenge Tour Order of Merit ensuring his place in the 2017 Challenge Tour. He also represented the Netherlands, partnering Joost Luiten in the 2016 World Cup of Golf where they finished T17.

In 2017, in a year hampered by a minor back problem, van Driel could only finish 91st in the final Challenge Tour rankings.

In 2018, van Driel claimed the first Challenge Tour win by a Dutch golfer in 5 years, in the Euram Bank Open in Austria in July. and ended in 34th position in the year-end Challenge Tour rankings.

2019 was van Driel's fourth season on the Challenge Tour. He won the Rolex Trophy and with six other top-10 finishes he ended 13th in the 2019 Order of Merit, earning direct promotion to the 2020 European Tour in Category 14. He also played in four main tour events, with a best result of 2nd place in the Belgian Knockout. In December he was voted Dutch Golfer of the year.

=== 2020 ===
In a European Tour season seriously disrupted by the COVID-19 pandemic, van Driel finished 157th in the Race to Dubai year end rankings.

=== 2021 ===
With the rankings from 2019 carried forward for an extra year because of the COVID-19 pandemic, van Driel played his 2nd European Tour season in Category 14. With one 2nd-place finish, in the Porsche European Open, 4th place in the Dutch Open and three other top-10 finishes, van Driel ended 97th in the Race to Dubai 2021 year end rankings., earning a full Tour card in Category 10 for 2022.

== Amateur wins ==
- 2007 Dutch National Under 18 Strokeplay Championship
- 2008 Dutch National Open Strokeplay Championship
- 2010 Dutch National Under 21 Strokeplay Championship
- 2013 Dutch National Matchplay Championship, Dutch National Foursomes Championship (with Bernard Geelkerken)

== Professional wins (7) ==
=== European Tour wins (1) ===
| No. | Date | Tournament | Winning score | Margin of victory | Runners-up |
|---|---|---|---|---|---|
| 1 | 25 Feb 2024 | Magical Kenya Open | −14 (66-69-68-67=270) | 2 strokes | (England) Joe Dean, (Spain) Nacho Elvira |

European Tour playoff record (0–1)

| No. | Year | Tournament | Opponents | Result |
|---|---|---|---|---|
| 1 | 2025 | Soudal Open | (Scotland) Ewen Ferguson, (Norway) Kristoffer Reitan | Reitan won with birdie on second extra hole |

=== Challenge Tour wins (2) ===
| No. | Date | Tournament | Winning score | Margin of victory | Runner-up |
|---|---|---|---|---|---|
| 1 | 29 Jul 2018 | Euram Bank Open | −17 (70-64-62-67=263) | 1 stroke | (Scotland) David Law |
| 2 | 24 Aug 2019 | Rolex Trophy | −23 (68-70-63-64=265) | 1 stroke | (Northern Ireland) Cormac Sharvin |

=== Alps Tour wins (1) ===
| No. | Date | Tournament | Winning score | Margin of victory | Runners-up |
|---|---|---|---|---|---|
| 1 | 27 Sep 2015 | Open International de Marcilly | −11 (66-65-71=202) | 1 stroke | (France) Damien Perrier, (France) Jean-Pierre Verselin |

=== Other wins (3) ===
- 2015 Dutch National Strokeplay Championship
- 2016 Duinzicht Invitational
- 2018 Duinzicht Invitational

== Team appearances ==
Amateur

- European Boys' Team Championship (representing the Netherlands): 2007
- European Amateur Team Championship (representing the Netherlands): 2007, 2010, 2014
- St Andrews Trophy (representing the Continent of Europe): 2014

Professional

- World Cup (representing the Netherlands): 2016

== See also ==
- 2019 Challenge Tour graduates
- 2023 European Tour Qualifying School graduates
