= Damien Perrier =

French professional golfer (born 1989)

Personal information
- Nationality: France
- Born: 6 July 1989 (age 37) Rennes, France
- Height: 1.83 m (6 ft 0 in)
- Weight: 80 kg (180 lb; 13 st)

Career
- Sport: Golf
- Turned professional: 2007
- Current tour: Challenge Tour
- Former tours: European Tour; Alps Tour; EPD Tour
- Professional wins: 5

Number of wins by tour
- Challenge Tour: 1
- Other: 4

Damien Perrier (born 6 July 1989) is a French professional golfer.

== Professional career ==
Perrier turned professional in late 2007. He played on mini-tours, including the Alps Tour and the EPD Tour, winning once on each tour. He has also played on the Challenge Tour, with varying status, since 2010. He earned a 2016 Challenge Tour card by finishing third on the 2015 Alps Tour Order of Merit.

Perrier won his first Challenge Tour event in May 2016 at the D+D Real Czech Challenge.

Perrier returned to the winner's circle in September 2024 when he won the Longwy Alps Open on the Alps Tour. He went on to finish fourth on the 2024 Alps Tour Order of Merit, earning status to play on the 2025 Challenge Tour.

== Amateur wins ==
this list is incomplete

- 2007 British Boys Amateur

== Professional wins (5) ==
=== Challenge Tour wins (1) ===
No.	Date	Tournament	Winning score	Margin of victory	Runners-up
1	29 May 2016	D+D Real Czech Challenge	−24 (69-65-62-68=264)	1 stroke	(France) Adrien Saddier, (England) Jordan Smith

=== Alps Tour wins (2) ===
No.	Date	Tournament	Winning score	Margin of victory	Runner(s)-up
1	6 Sep 2009	Open International de Normandie	−17 (64-69-66-68=267)	2 strokes	(France) Fabien Marty
2	7 Sep 2024	Longwy Alps Open	−14 (69-70-63=202)	1 stroke	(France) Benjamin Kédochim, (Netherlands) Vince van Veen

=== EPD Tour wins (1) ===
No.	Date	Tournament	Winning score	Margin of victory	Runner-up
1	3 Mar 2012	Amelkis Classic	−9 (69-69-69=207)	Playoff	(Portugal) Tiago Cruz

=== French Tour wins (1) ===
No.	Date	Tournament	Winning score	Margin of victory	Runners-up
1	26 Nov 2015	Internationaux de France Professionels de Double (with Fabien Marty)	−15 (64-68-69=201)	4 strokes	(France) François Calmels and (France) Charles-Édouard Russo, (France) Julien Forêt and (France) Alexandre Kaleka

== Team appearances ==
Amateur

- European Boys' Team Championship (representing France): 2007

== See also ==
- 2016 Challenge Tour graduates
