= 2013 PGA EuroPro Tour =

Golf tour season

2013 PGA EuroPro Tour season
- Duration: 30 April 2013 – 17 October 2013
- Number of official events: 15
- Most wins: (Wales) Oliver Farr (2) (England) George Woolgar (2)
- Order of Merit: (Wales) Oliver Farr

The 2013 PGA EuroPro Tour, titled as the 2013 888poker.com PGA EuroPro Tour for sponsorship reasons, was the 12th season of the PGA EuroPro Tour, a third-tier tour recognised by the European Tour.

== Schedule ==
The following table lists official events during the 2013 season.

| Date | Tournament | Location | Purse (£) | Winner (Note: The number in brackets after each winner's name is the number of PGA EuroPro Tour events they had won up to and including that tournament. It is rare for someone to accumulate many wins on the PGA EuroPro Tour as success at this level usually leads to promotion to the Challenge Tour.) |
|---|---|---|---|---|
| 2 May | Motocaddy Masters | Norfolk | 40,110 | (England) Dan Waite (1) |
| 17 May | Astbury Hall Classic | Shropshire | 39,380 | (England) James Hepworth (3) |
| 1 Jun | Kerry London Championship | Surrey | 39,380 | (England) Richard Wallis (1) |
| 21 Jun | PDC and World Snooker Open | Northamptonshire | 39,185 | (England) Alex Belt (1) |
| 30 Jun | Buildbase Open | Oxfordshire | 41,195 | (New Zealand) Harry Bateman (1) |
| 12 Jul | Grant Property Investment Championship | Moray | 40,110 | (Scotland) Paul McKechnie (3) |
| 26 Jul | Kingspan Concra Wood Open | Ireland | 39,380 | (England) Marcus Armitage (1) |
| 2 Aug | Rowallan Castle Open | Ayrshire | 41,330 | (Wales) Mark Laskey (1) |
| 9 Aug | MarHall.com Scottish Classic | Renfrewshire | 39,380 | (England) Dave Coupland (1) |
| 16 Aug | Sweetspot Classic | Northumberland | 40,110 | (England) George Woolgar (2) |
| 23 Aug | HotelPlanner.com Championship | East Sussex | 40,280 | (England) Daniel Gavins (1) |
| 30 Aug | WPT Championship | Oxfordshire | 41,195 | (England) George Woolgar (3) |
| 12 Sep | Eagle Orchid Scottish Masters | Angus | 39,935 | (Wales) Oliver Farr (1) |
| 27 Sep | Clipper Logistics Championship | West Yorkshire | 39,935 | (England) Billy Hemstock (2) |
| 17 Oct | 888poker.com Tour Championship | Kent | 60,000 | (Wales) Oliver Farr (2) |

== Order of Merit ==
The Order of Merit was based on prize money won during the season, calculated in Pound sterling. The top five players on the Order of Merit earned status to play on the 2014 Challenge Tour.

| Position | Player | Prize money (£) | Status earned |
|---|---|---|---|
| 1 | (Wales) Oliver Farr | 33,495 | Promoted to Challenge Tour |
| 2 | (England) Daniel Gavins | 32,244 | Promoted to Challenge Tour |
| 3 | (England) George Woolgar | 27,692 | Promoted to Challenge Tour |
| 4 | (England) Dave Coupland | 18,364 | Promoted to Challenge Tour |
| 5 | (Scotland) Paul McKechnie | 16,596 | Promoted to Challenge Tour |
| 6 | (England) Richard Wallis | 16,527 | |
| 7 | (England) Billy Hemstock | 14,650 | |
| 8 | (Wales) Mark Laskey | 14,165 | |
| 9 | (England) Marcus Armitage | 14,108 | |
| 10 | (England) James Hepworth | 12,589 | |
