= Manuel Trappel =

Austrian professional golfer (born 1989)

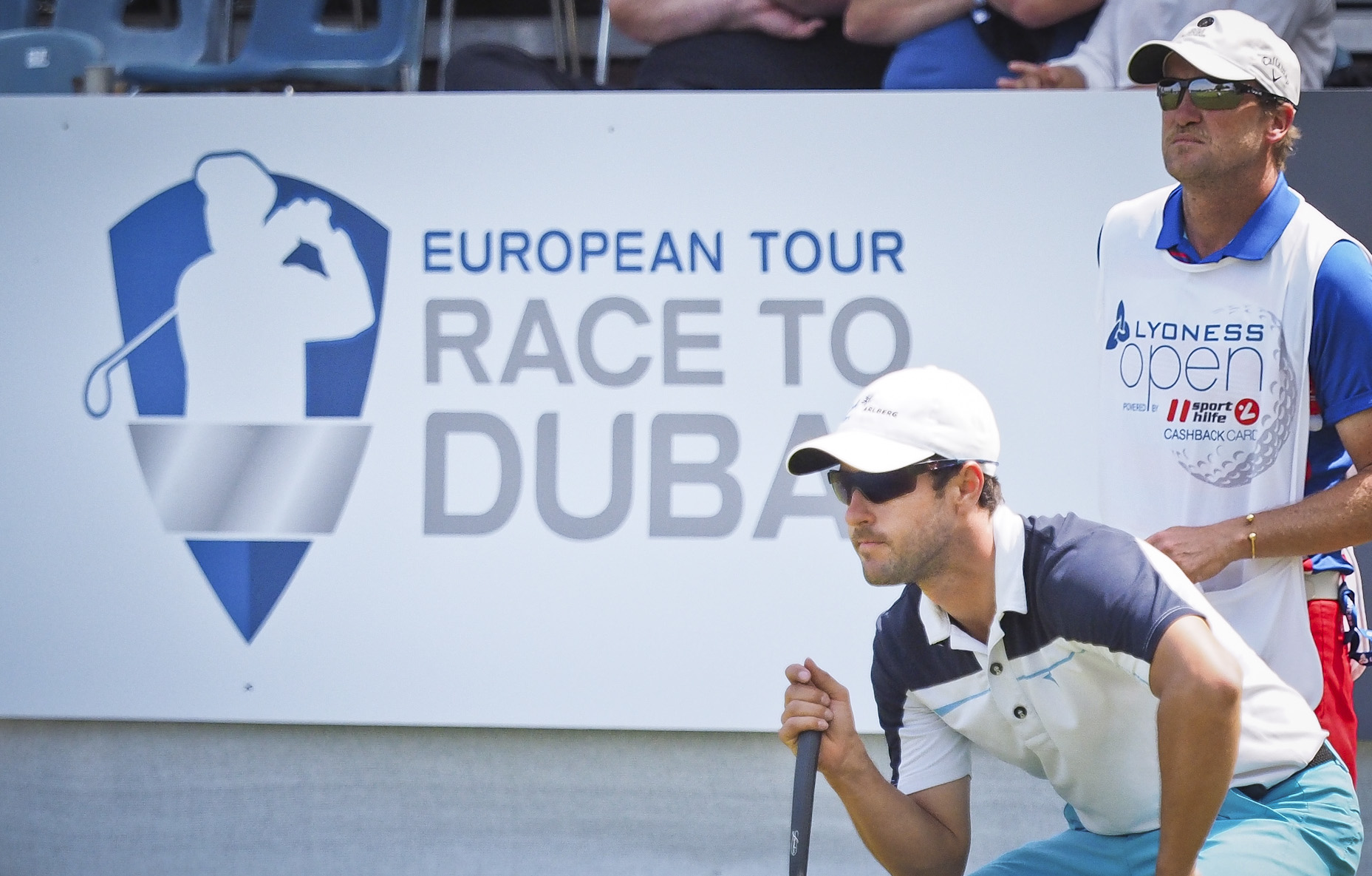
- Trappel in 2016

Personal information
- Full name: Manuel Trappel
- Nationality: Austria
- Born: 16 September 1989 (age 37) Dornbirn, Austria
- Height: 1.74 m (5 ft 8 1/2 in)
- Weight: 70 kg (154 lb)

Career
- Sport: Golf
- College: University of Innsbruck
- Turned professional: 2013
- Former tour: Challenge Tour

Best results in major championships
- Masters Tournament: DNP
- PGA Championship: DNP
- U.S. Open: DNP
- The Open Championship: CUT: 2012

Achievements and awards
- Austrian Golfer of the Year: 2011

Manuel Trappel (born 16 September 1989) is an Austrian professional golfer and former Challenge Tour player. In 2011 he became the first Austrian to win the European Amateur.

== Career ==
Trappel starting playing golf at GolfPark Bregenzerwald at the age of nine. He won the Vorarlberg State Championship for the first time in 2005. In 2011, he won the Austrian National Open Golf Championship (Nationale Offene Staatsmeisterschaft) before winning the European Amateur at Halmstad Golf Club in Sweden. He won on the third hole in a playoff against Walker Cup player Steven Brown. This title brought Trappel an invitation to the 2012 Open Championship at Royal Lytham & St Annes Golf Club.

In 2011, Trappel played in his first European Tour event, the Austrian Open, where he made the cut and finished tied for 70th place. In December 2011, he was named the Austrian Golf Association "Golfer of the Year". He helped the European side win the St Andrews Trophy and the Bonallack Trophy in 2012.

Trappel turned professional in February 2013 and played on the Challenge Tour between 2013 and 2019. His best finish was as runner-up at the 2016 Red Sea Egyptian Challenge, 2 strokes behind Jordan Smith. He lives in Bregenz and studied Economic Law at the University of Innsbruck.

== Amateur wins ==
- 2005 Vorarlberg State Championship
- 2011 Austrian National Open Golf Championship, European Amateur

== Results in major championships ==
| Tournament | 2012 |
|---|---|
| The Open Championship | CUT |

Note: Trappel only played in The Open Championship.
CUT = missed the half-way cut

== Team appearances ==
Amateur

- Eisenhower Trophy (representing Austria): 2012
- St Andrews Trophy (representing the Continent of Europe): 2012 (winners)
- Bonallack Trophy (representing Europe): 2012 (winners)
