= 2018 PGA EuroPro Tour =

Golf tour season

2018 PGA EuroPro Tour season
- Duration: 16 May 2018 – 26 October 2018
- Number of official events: 16
- Most wins: (England) Mark Young (3)
- Order of Merit: (England) Dave Coupland

The 2018 PGA EuroPro Tour, titled as the 2018 HotelPlanner.com PGA EuroPro Tour for sponsorship reasons, was the 17th season of the PGA EuroPro Tour, a third-tier tour recognised by the European Tour.

== Schedule ==
The following table lists official events during the 2018 season.

Date	Tournament	Location	Purse (£)	Winner (Note: The number in brackets after each winner's name is the number of PGA EuroPro Tour events they had won up to and including that tournament. It is rare for someone to accumulate many wins on the PGA EuroPro Tour as success at this level usually leads to promotion to the Challenge Tour.)	OWGR points
18 May	Motocaddy Masters	Oxfordshire	46,735	(Scotland) Paul O'Hara (1)	4
1 Jun	Matchroom Sport Championship	Buckinghamshire	50,855	(England) Billy Spooner (1)	4
8 Jun	PDC Golf Championship	Oxfordshire	47,320	(England) Scott Fallon (1)	4
14 Jun	Eagle Orchid Scottish Masters	Angus	50,410	(England) Chris Gane (2)	4
22 Jun	Jessie May World Snooker Championship	Somerset	46,735	(England) Mark Young (1)	4
29 Jun	Cumberwell Park Championship	Wiltshire	46,735	(England) Mark Young (2)	4
6 Jul	Dawson and Sanderson Classic	Northumberland	46,735	(England) Sam Connor (4)	4
13 Jul	Clipper Logistics Championship	West Yorkshire	46,736	(Scotland) Craig Ross (2)	4
20 Jul	Ablrate.com Championship	Cheshire	48,955	(England) Dave Coupland (2)	4
27 Jul	Pentahotels Championship	Berkshire	47,030	(England) Jordan Wrisdale (1)	4
3 Aug	IFX and Winged Boots Championship	Surrey	51,280	(England) Dave Coupland (3)	4
11 Aug	Nokia Masters	West Sussex	47,885	(England) Billy Hemstock (5)	4
17 Aug	FORE Business Championship	East Sussex	46,735	(Republic of Ireland) Tim Rice (3)	4
31 Aug	Prem Group Irish Masters	Ireland	49,210	(England) Mark Young (3)	4
21 Sep	Newmachar Golf Club Challenge	Aberdeenshire	47,885	(England) Billy Spooner (2)	4
26 Oct	Tour Championships	Spain	99,510	(England) Nick McCarthy (2)	4

== Order of Merit ==
The Order of Merit was based on prize money won during the season, calculated in Pound sterling. The top five players on the Order of Merit (not otherwise exempt) earned status to play on the 2019 Challenge Tour.

Position	Player	Prize money (£)	Status earned
1	(England) Dave Coupland	42,895	Promoted to Challenge Tour
2	(England) Mark Young	37,513	Promoted to Challenge Tour
3	(England) Nick McCarthy	29,689	Qualified for Challenge Tour (made cut in Q School)
4	(England) Billy Spooner	28,025	Promoted to Challenge Tour
5	(England) Joe Dean	20,503	Qualified for Challenge Tour (made cut in Q School)
6	(England) Chris Gane	18,757	Promoted to Challenge Tour
7	(Scotland) Craig Ross	17,079	Qualified for Challenge Tour (made cut in Q School)
8	(England) Jordan Wrisdale	16,202	Promoted to Challenge Tour
9	(England) Sam Connor	15,999	
10	(England) Scott Fallon	15,480	
