= Oscar Florén =

Swedish professional golfer

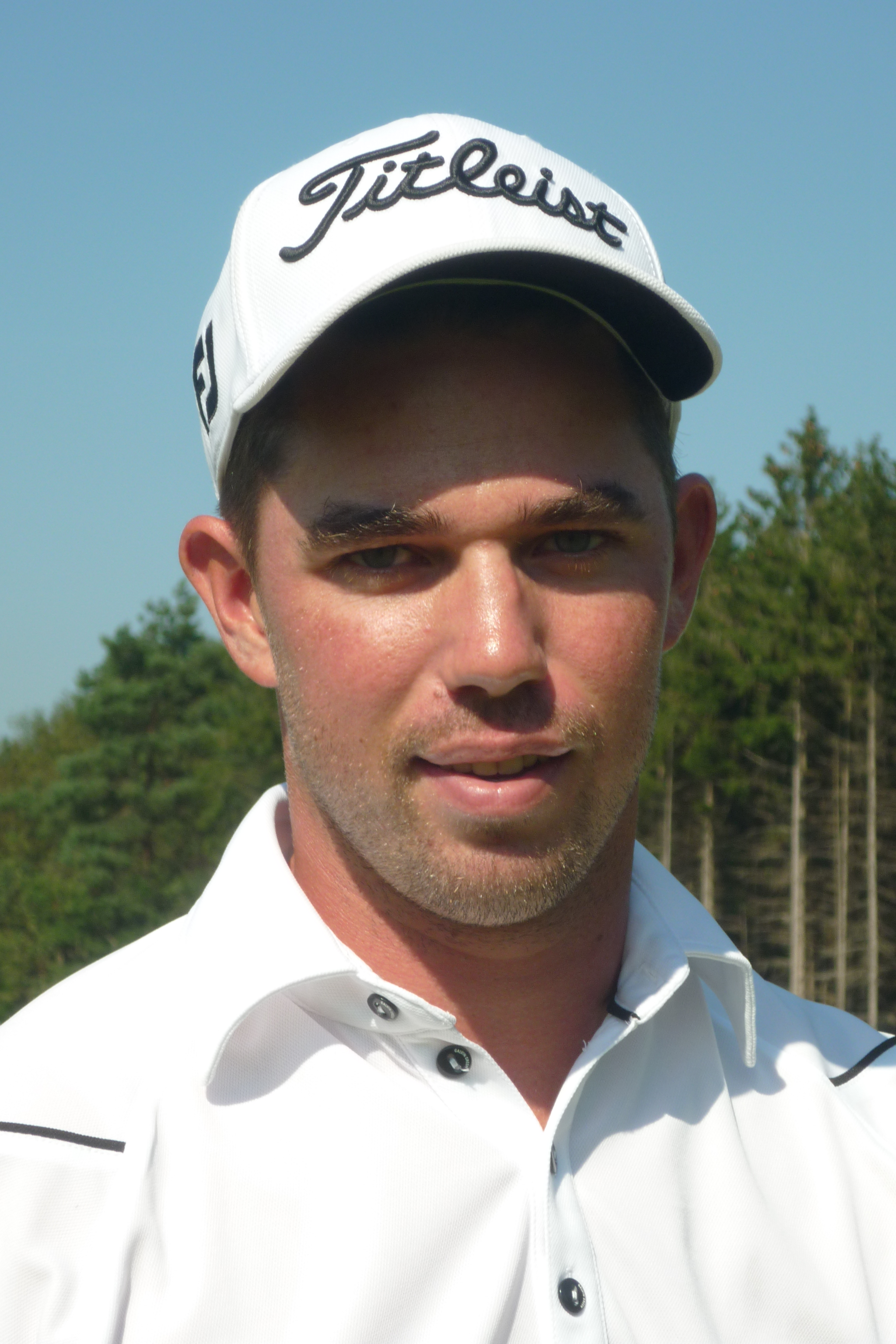
- Florén in 2012

Personal information
- Full name: Erik Oscar Florén
- Nationality: Sweden
- Born: 3 May 1984 (age 42) Mölndal, Sweden
- Height: 1.85 m (6 ft 1 in)

Career
- Sport: Golf
- College: Texas Tech University
- Turned professional: 2007
- Former tours: European Tour; Challenge Tour
- Professional wins: 1

Number of wins by tour
- Challenge Tour: 1

Best results in major championships
- Masters Tournament: DNP
- PGA Championship: DNP
- U.S. Open: DNP
- The Open Championship: CUT: 2005, 2013, 2014
Medal record
European Golf Team Championships
Bronze medal – third place	2018 Gleneagles	Mixed team

Erik Oscar Florén (born 3 May 1984) is a Swedish professional golfer.

== Career ==
Florén was born in Mölndal near Gothenburg. He attended Texas Tech University in the United States where he was named an NCAA First Team All-American in 2006.

Since turning professional in 2007, he has competed on Europe's second tier Challenge Tour. In August 2010 he won for the first time at the SWALEC Wales Challenge, and went on to finish the season in 6th place on the Challenge Tour Rankings to graduate to the top level European Tour for 2011. At the end of a poor 2012 Floren successfully completed qualifying school.

== Professional wins (1) ==
=== Challenge Tour wins (1) ===
No.	Date	Tournament	Winning score	Margin of victory	Runner-up
1	28 Aug 2010	SWALEC Wales Challenge	−8 (69-65-71-75=280)	1 stroke	(Scotland) Raymond Russell

Challenge Tour playoff record (0–1)

No.	Year	Tournament	Opponent	Result
1	2010	Turkish Airlines Challenge	(England) Charlie Ford	Lost to birdie on first extra hole

== Results in major championships ==
Tournament	2005	2006	2007	2008	2009	2010	2011	2012	2013	2014
The Open Championship	CUT								CUT	CUT

CUT = missed the halfway cut
Note: Florén only played in The Open Championship.

== Team appearances ==
Amateur

- Jacques Léglise Trophy (representing Continental Europe): 2002
- European Youths' Team Championship (representing Sweden): 2004
- Eisenhower Trophy (representing Sweden): 2004, 2006
- European Amateur Team Championship (representing Sweden): 2005
- Palmer Cup (representing Europe): 2006 (winners), 2007

Professional

- European Championships (representing Sweden): 2018

== See also ==
- 2010 Challenge Tour graduates
- 2012 European Tour Qualifying School graduates
