= Egyptian Challenge =

Golf tournament

Red Sea Egyptian Challenge
Tournament information
- Location: Ain Sukhna, Suez, Egypt
- Established: 2016
- Course: Sokhna Golf Club
- Par: 72
- Length: 6,968 yards (6,372 m)
- Tour: Challenge Tour
- Format: Stroke play
- Prize fund: €180,000
- Month played: April
- Final year: 2016

Tournament record score
- Aggregate: 270 Jordan Smith (2016)
- To par: −18 as above

Final champion
- (England) Jordan Smith
- Location in Egypt

The Red Sea Egyptian Challenge was a golf tournament on the Challenge Tour. It was played in April 2016 at Sokhna Golf Club in Ain Sukhna, Suez, Egypt.

== Winners ==
Year	Winner	Score	To par	Margin of victory	Runners-up
2016	(England) Jordan Smith	270	−18	2 strokes	(Switzerland) Joel Girrbach (England) Garrick Porteous (Austria) Manuel Trappel
