= Prague Golf Challenge =

Raiffeisenbank Golf Challenge

Tournament information
- Location: Brno, Czech Republic
- Established: 2017
- Course: Kaskáda Golf Resort
- Par: 71
- Length: 7,053 yards (6,449 m)
- Tour: Challenge Tour
- Format: Stroke play
- Prize fund: €300,000
- Month played: June

Tournament record score
- Aggregate: 263 Palmer Jackson (2025)
- To par: −24 Garrick Porteous (2017) −24 Martin Simonsen (2022)

Current champion
- (Germany) Anton Albers

Location map
- Location in the Czech Republic

The Prague Golf Challenge is a golf tournament on the Challenge Tour, played at Kaskáda Golf Resort in Brno, Czech Republic. It was first played in July 2017 and was won by Garrick Porteous. In 2019 the event was moved to May, two weeks before the D+D Real Czech Challenge, the other Challenge Tour tournament played in the Czech Republic.

== History ==
The tournament was founded 2017 and was played at Prague City Golf. In 2021, the tournament moved to the Kaskáda Golf Resort in Brno and was renamed as the Kaskáda Golf Challenge. In 2025, Raiffeisenbank became the title sponsor of the event, being renamed again as the Raiffeisenbank Golf Challenge.

== Winners ==
Year	Winner	Score	To par	Margin of victory	Runner(s)-up
Raiffeisenbank Golf Challenge
2026	(Germany) Anton Albers	264	−20	3 strokes	(United States) Alex Goff (Japan) Tatsunori Shogenji
2025	(United States) Palmer Jackson	263	−21	6 strokes	(Hong Kong) Matthew Cheung (Sweden) Tobias Jonsson
Kaskáda Golf Challenge
2024	(Denmark) Hamish Brown	266	−18	2 strokes	(South Africa) Robin Williams
2023	(Italy) Lorenzo Scalise	272	−12	3 strokes	(Spain) Manuel Elvira
2022	(Denmark) Martin Simonsen	264	−20	4 strokes	(England) Marco Penge
2021	(Germany) Marcel Schneider	268	−16	1 stroke	(New Zealand) Josh Geary (Australia) Dimitrios Papadatos (Italy) Lorenzo Scalise
Prague Golf Challenge
2020	Cancelled due to the COVID-19 pandemic				
2019	(France) Antoine Rozner	271	−17	7 strokes	(England) Richard Bland (France) Mathieu Fenasse (Denmark) Mark Haastrup (Denmark) Martin Simonsen
2018	(England) Ben Stow	270	−18	1 stroke	(Switzerland) Joel Girrbach
2017	(England) Garrick Porteous	264	−24	5 strokes	(France) Julien Guerrier (Belgium) Christopher Mivis (Scotland) Bradley Neil
