= Royal Golf Dar Es Salam =

Golf club in Rabat, Morocco

- Location in Morocco
- 33.917°N 6.831°W

Club information
- Location: Rabat, Morocco
- Established: 1971
- Total holes: 45
- Tournaments: Trophée Hassan II; Lalla Meryem Cup
- Website: royalgolfdaressalam.com

Red Course
- Designed by: Robert Trent Jones; Cabell Robinson
- Par: 73
- Length: 6,980 m

Blue Course
- Designed by: Robert Trent Jones; Cabell Robinson
- Par: 72
- Length: 6,467 m

Green Course
- Par: 64
- Length: 4,340 m

Royal Golf Dar Es Salam is a golf club located in Rabat, the capital of Morocco. It has hosted tournaments on the European Tour, Ladies European Tour, Asian Tour and PGA Tour Champions.

== History ==
The late King Hassan II wanted to build a flagship 36-hole complex in Morocco's capital, Rabat. A sandy, tree-lined property with a rolling contour was chosen, and the 440 hectare domain in the heart of a cork oak forest became Royal Golf Dar Es Salam (House of Peace). Designed by Robert Trent Jones and his long-time European-based associate, Cabell Robinson, it opened in 1971. According to the journal Golf Course Architecture, the Red Course is a strong contender for the title of best course by Jones.

The Red Course is arguably the best known tournament course in Morocco, having hosted the Trophée Hassan II since it opened. It was ranked among the World's Top 100 courses as recently as the early 1990s. It was redesigned in 2017–2018 by James Duncan, a long-time associate with Coore and Crenshaw design, focused on tree removal, bunker reconstruction and green enlargement.

Before the Hassan II Golf Trophy became a European Tour event in 2001 it was held on an invitational basis from 1971. Past winners include Billy Casper, Lee Trevino, Vijay Singh, Payne Stewart, Nick Price, Colin Montgomerie and Ernie Els.

== Tournaments hosted ==
Tour	Tournament	Year(s)
European Tour	Moroccan Open	1987, 1992, 1996, 2001
European Tour	Trophée Hassan II	2001–2019
Ladies European Tour	Lalla Meryem Cup	2010–
Pro Golf Tour	Open Dar Es Salam	2015
Challenge Tour	Lalla Aïcha Challenge Tour	2019
Asian Tour	International Series Morocco	2022, 2024
PGA Tour Champions	Trophy Hassan II	2023–

== See also ==
- List of golf courses designed by Robert Trent Jones
- Dar Es Salam Palace, Rabat
