= Matthieu Pavon =

French professional golfer (born 1992)

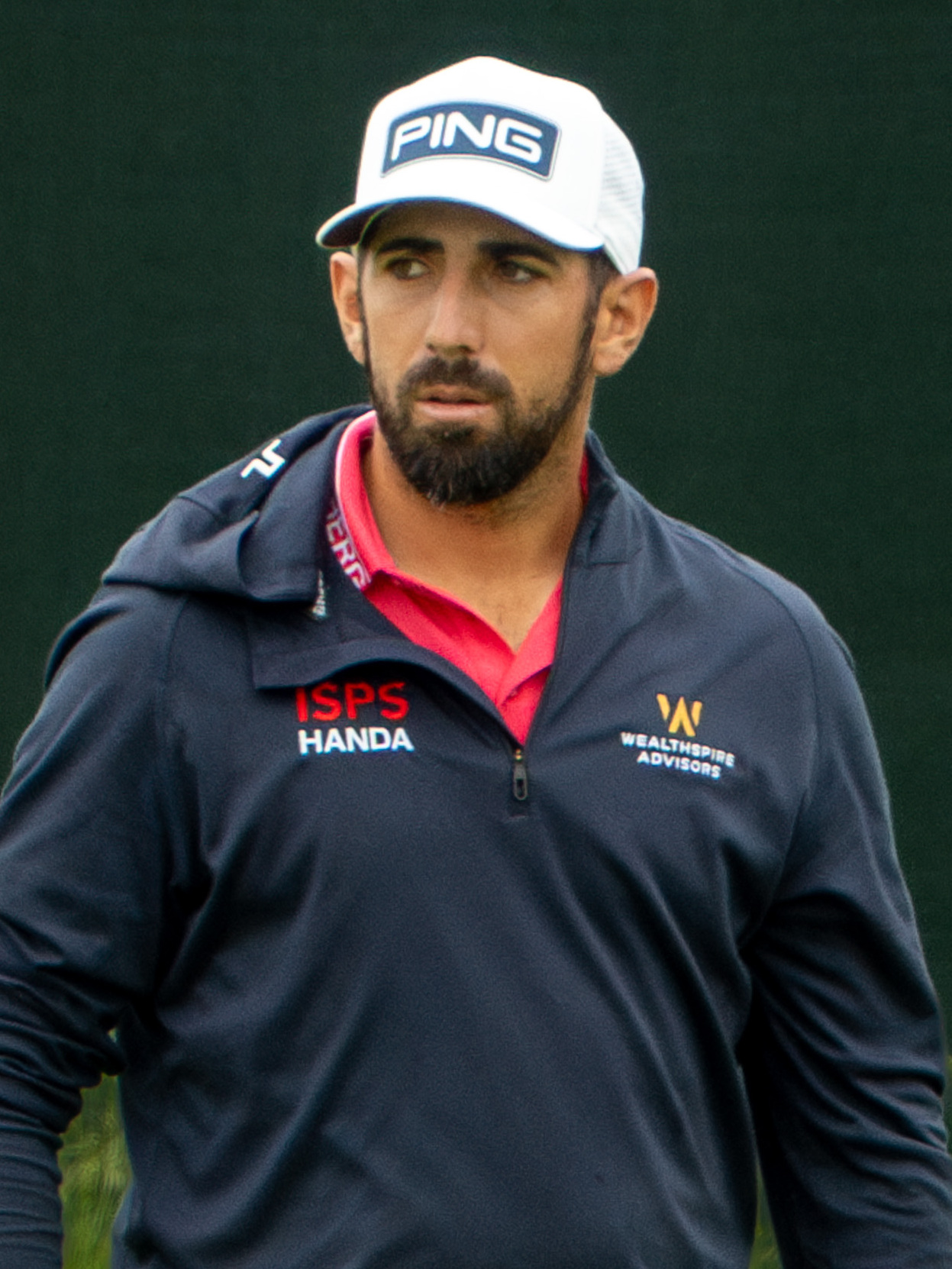
- Pavon at the 2025 Travelers Championship

Personal information
- Nationality: France
- Born: 2 November 1992 (age 33) Toulouse, France
- Height: 1.83 m (6 ft 0 in)
- Weight: 85 kg (187 lb)

Career
- Sport: Golf
- Turned professional: 2013
- Current tours: PGA Tour; European Tour
- Former tours: Challenge Tour; Alps Tour
- Professional wins: 6
- Highest ranking: 20 (5 May 2024) (as of 25 October 2026)

Number of wins by tour
- PGA Tour: 1
- European Tour: 1
- Other: 4

Best results in major championships
- Masters Tournament: T12: 2024
- PGA Championship: T41: 2025
- U.S. Open: 5th: 2024
- The Open Championship: T50: 2024

Matthieu Pavon (born 2 November 1992) is a French professional golfer who plays on the PGA Tour and the European Tour. With his victory at the 2024 Farmers Insurance Open, Pavon became the first French golfer to win on the PGA Tour since Arnaud Massy at the British Open in 1907.

== Professional career ==
After turning professional Pavon played on the Alps Tour in 2014 and 2015. He won the Open International de Rebetz in 2014 and the Servizitalia Open in 2015. He reached the final stage of the 2015 European Tour Q School and gained a place on the Challenge Tour for 2016.

Pavon didn't win on the 2016 Challenge Tour but he finished in second place three times: at the Turkish Airlines Challenge, Montecchia Golf Open and Foshan Open. He was joint third in the NBO Golf Classic Grand Final and finished sixth on the Road To Oman Rankings to earn his 2017 European Tour card.

Pavon's first season on the European Tour was moderately successful and he finished 49th in the Order of Merit. His best result was to finish second in the 2018 AfrAsia Bank Mauritius Open at Anahita after a final round 67. He finished third in the 2017 Scottish Open. The tournament was one of the Open Qualifying Series events and his high finish gave him an entry to the 2017 Open Championship the following week. He had rounds of 74 and 78 and missed the cut.

Pavon had less success on the 2018 European Tour, finishing the season 89th in the Order of Merit. He finished tied for 5th in the AfrAsia Bank Mauritius Open at the end of 2017 but his only other top-10 finish was in the Dubai Duty Free Irish Open. He qualified for his first U.S. Open. He started with a 71 and made the cut, despite a second round 77, finishing in a tie for 25th place.

In October 2023, Pavon won his first European Tour event at the Acciona Open de España. He recorded a total of 261 (23-under-par) to win wire-to-wire by four shots. He finished the 2023 European Tour season in 15th place on the Race to Dubai, earning him PGA Tour membership for the 2024 season.

In January 2024, he won the Farmers Insurance Open by one stroke over Nicolai Højgaard. With this win, he became the first Frenchman to win on the PGA Tour since Arnaud Massy won the 1907 Open Championship (later recognised as a PGA Tour victory). In February, he finished third at the AT&T Pebble Beach Pro-Am in California. He earned $1.36m in prize money and finished at −15, 2 strokes behind the winner Wyndham Clark.

== Personal life ==
His father is French former professional footballer Michel Pavon.

== Professional wins (6) ==
=== PGA Tour wins (1) ===
No.	Date	Tournament	Winning score	Margin of victory	Runner-up
1	27 Jan 2024	Farmers Insurance Open	−13 (69-65-72-69=275)	1 stroke	(Denmark) Nicolai Højgaard

=== European Tour wins (1) ===
No.	Date	Tournament	Winning score	Margin of victory	Runner-up
1	15 Oct 2023	Acciona Open de España	−23 (63-68-66-64=261)	4 strokes	(South Africa) Zander Lombard

=== Alps Tour wins (2) ===
No.	Date	Tournament	Winning score	Margin of victory	Runner(s)-up
1	3 May 2014	Open International de Rebetz	−7 (70-69-70=209)	1 stroke	(France) Baptiste Chapellan, (France) Thomas Elissalde
2	17 Jul 2015	Servizitalia Open	−17 (66-68-65=199)	Playoff	(Spain) Gerard Piris

=== French Tour wins (2) ===
No.	Date	Tournament	Winning score	Margin of victory	Runners-up
1	6 Apr 2018	Open Mont de Marsan	−9 (67-69-68=204)	4 strokes	(France) Guillaume Cambis, (France) Louis Cohen-Boyer
2	10 Dec 2023	Internationaux de France Professionnels de Double (with Julien Quesne)	−18 (63-68-67=198)	2 strokes	(Belgium) Axel de Smet and (Belgium) Christopher Mivis

== Results in major championships ==
Tournament	2017	2018
Masters Tournament		
U.S. Open		T25
The Open Championship	CUT	
PGA Championship		

Tournament	2019	2020	2021	2022	2023	2024	2025
Masters Tournament						T12	CUT
PGA Championship						CUT	T41
U.S. Open	CUT				CUT	5	T64
The Open Championship		NT				T50	CUT

Top 10
Did not play

CUT = missed the half-way cut
"T" = tied
NT = no tournament due to the COVID-19 pandemic

== Results in The Players Championship ==
Tournament	2025	2026
The Players Championship	T54	CUT

CUT = missed the halfway cut
"T" indicates a tie for a place

== Team appearances ==
Professional

- Team Cup (representing Continental Europe): 2025

== See also ==
- 2016 Challenge Tour graduates
- 2023 Race to Dubai dual card winners
