= Joel Girrbach =

Swiss professional golfer (born 1993)

Personal information
- Nationality: Switzerland
- Born: 19 July 1993 (age 33) Kreuzlingen, Thurgau, Switzerland
- Height: 1.81 m (5 ft 11 in)
- Weight: 76 kg (168 lb)

Career
- Sport: Golf
- Turned professional: 2015
- Current tour: European Tour
- Former tours: Challenge Tour; Pro Golf Tour
- Professional wins: 1

Number of wins by tour
- Challenge Tour: 1

Joel Girrbach (born 19 July 1993) is a Swiss professional golfer who plays on the European Tour. He won the 2017 Swiss Challenge on the Challenge Tour.

== Early life and amateur career ==
Girrbach started playing golf at the age of eight. He was playing off scratch by the time he was 16, and won the 2011 Swiss Junior Championship. He was educated at Berufsbildungszentrum Weinfeldenand.

== Professional career ==
Girrbach turned professional in 2015 and joined the Challenge Tour. In 2016, he was runner-up at the Red Sea Egyptian Challenge and in 2017 he won his first title, the Swiss Challenge at Golf Sempach by two strokes.

In 2018, he was runner-up at the Prague Golf Challenge and the Hopps Open de Provence.

In 2023, Girrbach was runner-up at The Challenge in India and the Hainan Open in China, and graduated to the European Tour for 2024. In his rookie season, he recorded several top-10 finishes, including a T-8 at the Bahrain Championship and a T-3 at the Volvo China Open. On the back of these results, he qualified for the 2024 Summer Olympics in Paris.

== Amateur wins ==
- 2011 Swiss Junior Championship
- 2013 Ticino Championship, Finnish Amateur
- 2014 Leman Championship

== Professional wins (1) ==
=== Challenge Tour wins (1) ===
| No. | Date | Tournament | Winning score | Margin of victory | Runner-up |
|---|---|---|---|---|---|
| 1 | 4 Jun 2017 | Swiss Challenge | −17 (68-67-64-68=267) | 2 strokes | (Scotland) Craig Lee |

== Team appearances ==
Amateur

- Duke of York Young Champions Trophy (representing Switzerland): 2011

== See also ==
- 2023 Challenge Tour graduates
