= Ras Al Khaimah Golf Challenge =

Tournament information
- Location: Ras Al Khaimah, United Arab Emirates
- Established: 2016
- Course: Al Hamra Golf Club
- Par: 72
- Length: 7,353 yards (6,724 m)
- Tour: Challenge Tour
- Format: Stroke play
- Prize fund: US$350,000
- Month played: October
- Final year: 2017

Tournament record score
- Aggregate: 268 Jordan Smith (2016)
- To par: −20 as above

Final champion
- (Sweden) Jens Dantorp
- Location in the United Arab Emirates

The Ras Al Khaimah Golf Challenge was a golf tournament on the Challenge Tour, Europe's second tier men's professional golf tour, held in Ras Al Khaimah, United Arab Emirates. It was first played in 2016 as the penultimate event ahead of the season-ending NBO Golf Classic Grand Final in neighboring Oman. The tournament was last played in 2017. Beginning in 2018, the course will host the Ras Al Khaimah Challenge Tour Grand Final.

== Winners ==
Year	Winner	Score	To par	Margin of victory	Runner-up
2017	(Sweden) Jens Dantorp	273	−15	Playoff	(Poland) Adrian Meronk
2016	(England) Jordan Smith	268	−20	1 stroke	(Portugal) José-Filipe Lima
