= Garrick Porteous =

English professional golfer

Personal information
- Full name: Garrick Rennie Porteous
- Nationality: England
- Born: 17 January 1990 (age 36) Colchester, England
- Height: 6 ft 1 in (1.85 m)
- Weight: 182 lb (83 kg; 13.0 st)
- Spouse: Maisie Porteous

Career
- Sport: Golf
- College: University of Tennessee
- Turned professional: 2014
- Current tour: Challenge Tour
- Former tours: European Tour; PGA EuroPro Tour
- Professional wins: 3

Number of wins by tour
- Challenge Tour: 2
- Other: 1

Best results in major championships
- Masters Tournament: CUT: 2014
- PGA Championship: DNP
- U.S. Open: DNP
- The Open Championship: CUT: 2013, 2019

Garrick Rennie Porteous (born 17 January 1990) is an English professional golfer who won The Amateur Championship in 2013 where he defeated Toni Hakula 6 and 5. In 2017 he won the Prague Golf Challenge on the Challenge Tour.

== Amateur career ==
Porteous played on the golf team at the University of Tennessee where he earned all-conference and all-region honors.

Porteous won the 2013 Amateur Championship where he defeated Toni Hakula, 6 & 5. This win earned him entry into the 2013 Open Championship, 2014 Masters Tournament, and the 2014 U.S. Open provided he maintained his amateur status. He also won the 2013 Scottish Amateur Stroke Play Championship and was runner-up in the 2013 Welsh Strokeplay Championship

== Professional career ==
Porteous turned professional after the 2014 Masters, forfeiting his spot in the U.S. Open. He made his professional debut at the Maybank Malaysian Open.

Since turning professional, Porteous has mainly played on the Challenge Tour. In July 2017, he won the Prague Golf Challenge by 5 strokes. His previous best finish had been joint runner-up in the 2016 Red Sea Egyptian Challenge. He qualified for the main European Tour for 2020 by finishing 14th in qualifying school.

== Amateur wins ==
- 2013 Amateur Championship, Scottish Amateur Stroke Play Championship

== Professional wins (3) ==
=== Challenge Tour wins (2) ===
No.	Date	Tournament	Winning score	Margin of victory	Runner(s)-up
1	9 Jul 2017	Prague Golf Challenge	−24 (66-67-64-67=264)	5 strokes	(France) Julien Guerrier, (Belgium) Christopher Mivis, (Scotland) Bradley Neil
2	21 Apr 2024	Abu Dhabi Challenge	−24 (66-63-64-63=256)	1 stroke	(France) Alexander Lévy

=== PGA EuroPro Tour wins (1) ===
No.	Date	Tournament	Winning score	Margin of victory	Runners-up
1	13 Jun 2014	FSC Invitational	−10 (66-68-66=200)	Playoff	(South Africa) Darryn Lloyd, (England) James Maw

== Results in major championships ==
Tournament	2013	2014	2015	2016	2017	2018
Masters Tournament		CUT				
U.S. Open						
The Open Championship	CUT					
PGA Championship						

Tournament	2019
Masters Tournament	
PGA Championship	
U.S. Open	
The Open Championship	CUT

Did not play

CUT = missed the half-way cut
"T" = tied

== Team appearances ==
Amateur

- Eisenhower Trophy (representing England): 2012
- St Andrews Trophy (representing Great Britain & Ireland): 2012
- European Amateur Team Championship (representing England): 2013 (winners)
- Walker Cup (representing Great Britain & Ireland): 2013

== See also ==
- 2019 European Tour Qualifying School graduates
- 2022 European Tour Qualifying School graduates
- 2023 European Tour Qualifying School graduates
