= Paul Howard (golfer) =

English professional golfer

Personal information
- Nationality: England
- Born: 30 September 1990 (age 36) Lancashire, England
- Height: 6 ft 2 in (1.88 m)

Career
- Sport: Golf
- Turned professional: 2015
- Former tour: Challenge Tour
- Professional wins: 2

Number of wins by tour
- Challenge Tour: 1
- Other: 1

Best results in major championships
- Masters Tournament: DNP
- PGA Championship: DNP
- U.S. Open: DNP
- The Open Championship: CUT: 2016

Paul Howard (born 30 September 1990) is an English professional golfer who played on the Challenge Tour.

Howard turned professional in early 2015 after a successful amateur career. In his first season he played on the Challenge Tour and the PGA EuroPro Tour. He had an early success winning the Paul Lawrie Foundation Granite City Classic on the PGA EuroPro Tour, and followed this with a third-place finish in the Wealth Design Invitational and a tie for second place in the PDC Open. In 2016 he played on the Challenge Tour and was joint runner-up in the Swiss Challenge, a stroke behind Alexander Knappe. He qualified for the 2016 Open Championship through Final Qualifying but missed the cut. In 2017 he won the Vierumäki Finnish Challenge by two shots from Simon Forsström, an event reduced to 54 holes by heavy rain.

== Amateur wins ==
- 2014 South American Amateur
- 2015 New South Wales Amateur

== Professional wins (2) ==
=== Challenge Tour wins (1) ===
No.	Date	Tournament	Winning score	Margin of victory	Runner-up
1	6 Aug 2017	Vierumäki Finnish Challenge	−17 (68-65-66=199) (Note: Shortened to 54 holes due to weather.)	2 strokes	(Sweden) Simon Forsström

=== PGA EuroPro Tour wins (1) ===
No.	Date	Tournament	Winning score	Margin of victory	Runner-up
1	26 Jun 2015	Paul Lawrie Foundation Granite City Classic	−15 (65-66-70=201)	1 stroke	(Scotland) Paul Shields

== Team appearances ==
Amateur

- European Amateur Team Championship (representing England): 2014
