= Golf at the 2007 Summer Universiade =

Golf at the XXIV Summer Universiade
- Venues: Water Mill Golf and Gardens
- Dates: 14–17 August 2007

Golf was contested at the 2007 Summer Universiade from August 14 to 17 at the Water Mill Golf and Gardens in Bangkok, Thailand.

== Medal winners ==
Event	Gold	Result	Silver	Result	Bronze	Result
Individual men	Ming-chuan Chen; Chinese Taipei	281 (−7)	Charles Ford; Great Britain	286 (−2)	Yuki Usami; Japan	286 (−2)
Individual women	Danielle McVeigh; Ireland	292 (+4)	Diana Cantú; Mexico	296 (+8)	Hiroko Ayada; Japan	297 (+9)
Team men	Thailand (THA); Kiradech Aphibarnrat; Ekalak Vaisayakul; Varun Israbhakdi; Varut Chomchalem	863	Mexico (MEX); Roberto Díaz; Julian Valenciana; Santiago Quirarte	864	Japan (JPN); Yuki Usami; Ryutaro Nagano; Yuta Ikeda; Daisuke Yasumoto	866
Team women	Mexico (MEX); Diana Cantú; Liliana Álvarez; Pamela Ontiveros	601	Ireland (IRL); Danielle McVeigh; Niamh Kitching; Gillian O'Leary	602	United States (USA); Jennifer Tangtiphaiboontana; Mary Ellen Jacobs; Selanee Henderson	603

== Medal table ==
Rank	Nation	Gold	Silver	Bronze	Total
1	Mexico	1	2	0	3
2	Ireland	1	1	0	2
3	Chinese Taipei	1	0	0	1
3	Thailand	1	0	0	1
5	Great Britain	0	1	0	1
6	Japan	0	0	3	3
7	United States	0	0	1	1
Totals (7 entries)		4	4	4	12
