= Daniel Gavins =

English professional golfer

Personal information
- Full name: Daniel Thomas Gavins
- Nationality: England
- Born: 20 March 1991 (age 35) Leeds, England
- Height: 6 ft 0 in (183 cm)

Career
- Sport: Golf
- Turned professional: 2012
- Current tour: European Tour
- Former tours: Challenge Tour; PGA EuroPro Tour
- Professional wins: 3

Number of wins by tour
- European Tour: 2
- Other: 1

Daniel Thomas Gavins (born 20 March 1991) is an English professional golfer who currently plays on the European Tour. He won his first European Tour event at the 2021 ISPS Handa World Invitational.

== Professional career ==
Gavins turned professional in 2012. He started his career playing on the PGA EuroPro Tour, winning once in 2013. He also finished 7th on the Order of Merit in 2015. He also played on the Challenge Tour.

In August 2021, Gavins won the ISPS Handa World Invitational by shooting a final-round 65 to beat David Horsey by one shot. He started the final round seven shots behind the leader.

In February 2023, Gavins won the Ras Al Khaimah Championship to claim his second European Tour victory. On the final hole, his ball found the water twice, but he managed to salvage a double-bogey by holing a 25-foot putt. He won by one shot ahead of Alexander Björk and Zander Lombard.

== Professional wins (3) ==
=== European Tour wins (2) ===
No.	Date	Tournament	Winning score	Margin of victory	Runner(s)-up
1	1 Aug 2021	ISPS Handa World Invitational	−13 (71-65-66-65=267)	1 stroke	(England) David Horsey
2	5 Feb 2023	Ras Al Khaimah Championship	−17 (68-66-68-69=271)	1 stroke	(Sweden) Alexander Björk, (South Africa) Zander Lombard

=== PGA EuroPro Tour wins (1) ===
No.	Date	Tournament	Winning score	Margin of victory	Runner-up
1	23 Aug 2013	HotelPlanner.com Championship	−12 (69-66-63=198)	3 strokes	(England) Dave Coupland

== See also ==
- 2015 European Tour Qualifying School graduates
- 2018 European Tour Qualifying School graduates
