= Dave Coupland =

English professional golfer

Personal information
- Full name: David Coupland
- Nationality: England
- Born: 16 March 1986 (age 40) Boston, Lincolnshire, England
- Height: 1.73 m (5 ft 8 in)

Career
- Sport: Golf
- Turned professional: 2012
- Current tour: European Tour
- Former tours: Challenge Tour; PGA EuroPro Tour
- Professional wins: 3

Best results in major championships
- Masters Tournament: DNP
- PGA Championship: DNP
- U.S. Open: CUT: 2021
- The Open Championship: CUT: 2007, 2016

Achievements and awards
- PGA EuroPro Tour Order of Merit winner: 2018

David Coupland (born 16 March 1986) is an English professional golfer.

== Amateur career ==
In 2010, Coupland won the Tillman Trophy with a record setting score.

In 2011, Coupland lost a playoff for the Australian Amateur Stroke Play Championship and represented England at the 2011 European Amateur Team Championship.

== Professional career ==
In 2018, he won twice and led the Order of Merit on the PGA EuroPro Tour, qualifying for the 2019 Challenge Tour. After finishing 55th in the 2019 Challenge Tour Order of Merit, Coupland qualified for the European Tour by way of Q School.

His 2020 season was limited due to the COVID-19 pandemic, so his playing privileges were extended to the 2021 season.

== Professional wins (3) ==
=== PGA EuroPro Tour wins (3) ===
No.	Date	Tournament	Winning score	Margin of victory	Runner(s)-up
1	9 Aug 2013	MarHall.com Scottish Classic	−11 (69-64-66=199)	Playoff	(Spain) Sebastián García Grout
2	20 Jul 2018	Ablrate.com Championship	−9 (69-70-68=207)	1 stroke	(England) Joe Dean, (England) Richard Mansell
3	3 Aug 2018	IFX and Winged Boots Championship	−16 (62-71-70=203)	2 strokes	(England) Richard Mansell

== Results in major championships ==
Results not in chronological order in 2020.

Tournament	2007	2008	2009
Masters Tournament			
U.S. Open			
The Open Championship	CUT		
PGA Championship			

Tournament	2010	2011	2012	2013	2014	2015	2016	2017	2018
Masters Tournament									
U.S. Open									
The Open Championship							CUT		
PGA Championship									

Tournament	2019	2020	2021
Masters Tournament			
PGA Championship			
U.S. Open			CUT
The Open Championship		NT	

Did not play

CUT = missed the half-way cut
NT = No tournament due to COVID-19 pandemic

== Team appearances ==
Amateur

- European Amateur Team Championship (representing England): 2011

== See also ==
- 2019 European Tour Qualifying School graduates
