= 2016 Challenge Tour =

Golf tour season

2016 Challenge Tour season
- Duration: 17 March 2016 – 5 November 2016
- Number of official events: 27
- Most wins: (Germany) Bernd Ritthammer (3)
- Rankings: (England) Jordan Smith

The 2016 Challenge Tour was the 28th season of the Challenge Tour, the official development tour to the European Tour.

== Schedule ==
The following table lists official events during the 2016 season.

Date	Tournament	Host country	Purse (€)	Winner (Note: The number in brackets after each winner's name is the number of Challenge Tour events they had won up to and including that tournament. This information is only shown for Challenge Tour members. It is rare for someone to accumulate many wins on the Challenge Tour as success at this level usually leads to promotion to the European Tour.)	OWGR points	Notes
20 Mar	Barclays Kenya Open	Kenya	220,000	(Sweden) Sebastian Söderberg (1)	12	
23 Apr	Red Sea Egyptian Challenge	Egypt	180,000	(England) Jordan Smith (1)	12	New tournament
1 May	Challenge de Madrid	Spain	170,000	(Scotland) Duncan Stewart (1)	12	
8 May	Turkish Airlines Challenge	Turkey	175,000	(France) Clément Sordet (2)	12	
15 May	Montecchia Open	Italy	250,000	(England) Gary King (1)	12	
29 May	D+D Real Czech Challenge	Czech Republic	175,000	(France) Damien Perrier (1)	12	
5 Jun	Swiss Challenge	Switzerland	170,000	(Germany) Alexander Knappe (1)	12	
12 Jun	KPMG Trophy	Belgium	170,000	(Sweden) Simon Forsström (1)	12	
19 Jun	Najeti Open	France	200,000	(Portugal) José-Filipe Lima (4)	12	
26 Jun	SSE Scottish Hydro Challenge	Scotland	250,000	(England) James Heath (2)	12	
3 Jul	Made in Denmark Challenge	Denmark	180,000	(Germany) Bernd Ritthammer (1)	12	
10 Jul	D+D Real Slovakia Challenge	Slovakia	170,000	(Norway) Espen Kofstad (3)	12	
17 Jul	Fred Olsen Challenge de España	Spain	170,000	(France) Adrien Saddier (1)	12	
24 Jul	Le Vaudreuil Golf Challenge	France	210,000	(Sweden) Alexander Björk (1)	12	
31 Jul	Tayto Northern Ireland Open	Northern Ireland	170,000	(New Zealand) Ryan Fox (2)	12	
7 Aug	Swedish Challenge	Sweden	200,000	(France) Joël Stalter (1)	12	New to Challenge Tour
14 Aug	Vierumäki Finnish Challenge	Finland	180,000	(England) Sam Walker (4)	12	
20 Aug	Rolex Trophy	Switzerland	250,000	(South Africa) Dylan Frittelli (2)	12	
28 Aug	Bridgestone Challenge	England	180,000	(Belgium) Thomas Detry (1)	12	
4 Sep	Cordon Golf Open	France	200,000	(Spain) Álvaro Velasco (3)	12	
11 Sep	Volopa Irish Challenge	Ireland	180,000	(Germany) Bernd Ritthammer (2)	12	
2 Oct	Kazakhstan Open	Kazakhstan	450,000	(England) Sam Walker (5)	13	
9 Oct	Terre dei Consoli Open	Italy	250,000	(Sweden) Johan Edfors (4)	12	
16 Oct	Hainan Open	China	US$262,500	(Germany) Alexander Knappe (2)	13	New to Challenge Tour
23 Oct	Foshan Open	China	US$500,000	(England) Marcus Armitage (1)	13	
29 Oct	Ras Al Khaimah Golf Challenge	UAE	US$350,000	(England) Jordan Smith (2)	13	New tournament
5 Nov	NBO Golf Classic Grand Final	Oman	400,000	(Germany) Bernd Ritthammer (3)	17	Flagship event

== Rankings ==
The rankings were titled as the Road to Oman and were based on tournament results during the season, calculated using a points-based system. The top 16 players on the rankings earned status to play on the 2017 European Tour.

Rank	Player	Points
1	(England) Jordan Smith	239,985
2	(Germany) Bernd Ritthammer	209,953
3	(Germany) Alexander Knappe	193,500
4	(New Zealand) Ryan Fox	160,768
5	(England) Sam Walker	158,370
