= Godfrey Thomas =

Godfrey Thomas may refer to:

- Sir Godfrey Thomas, 9th Baronet (1856–1919), British Army officer
- Sir Godfrey Thomas, 10th Baronet (1889–1968), British courtier, son of the above
