= Wales Seniors Open =

SSE Enterprise Wales Senior Open
Tournament information
- Location: Newport, Wales
- Established: 2001
- Course: Celtic Manor Resort
- Par: 72
- Length: 6,528 yards (5,969 m)
- Tour: European Senior Tour
- Format: Stroke play
- Prize fund: £250,000
- Month played: June
- Final year: 2016

Tournament record score
- Aggregate: 198 Zhang Lianwei (2016)
- To par: −12 as above

Final champion
- (China) Zhang Lianwei
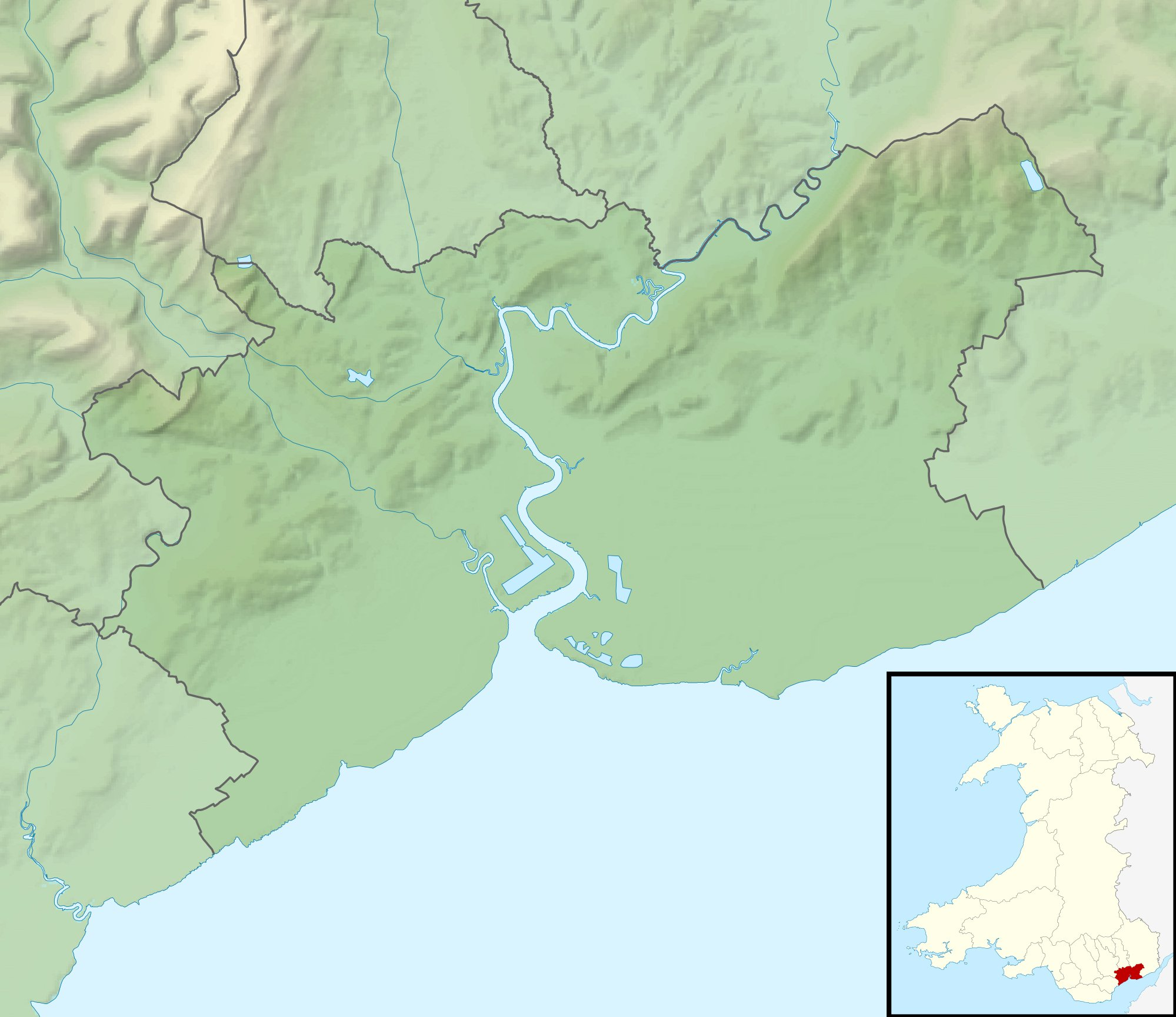
- Location in Wales Location in Newport

The Wales Seniors Open was a golf tournament on the European Senior Tour from 2001 to 2016. The prize fund was £250,000 in 2016.

== Tournament hosts ==
- 2001–05 Royal St David's Golf Club, Harlech
- 2006 Vale Hotel, Golf & Spa Resort, Hensol
- 2007–08, 2012 Conwy Golf Club, Caernarvonshire
- 2009–10, 2013 Royal Porthcawl Golf Club, Porthcawl
- 2015–16 Celtic Manor Resort, Newport

== Winners ==
Year	Winner	Score	To par	Margin of victory	Runner(s)-up	Venue
SSE Enterprise Wales Senior Open
2016	(China) Zhang Lianwei	198	−12	3 strokes	(England) Paul Broadhurst	Celtic Manor
2015	(England) Paul Wesselingh	203	−7	2 strokes	(Australia) Peter Fowler (Wales) Ian Woosnam	Celtic Manor
2014: No tournament
Speedy Services Wales Senior Open
2013	(England) Philip Golding	211	−2	2 strokes	(England) David J. Russell	Royal Porthcawl
2012	(England) Barry Lane	209	−7	1 stroke	(England) Philip Golding	Conwy
2011: No tournament
Ryder Cup Wales Seniors Open
2010	(South Africa) John Bland	208	−8	1 stroke	(Paraguay) Ángel Franco (South Africa) Chris Williams	Royal Porthcawl
2009	(South Africa) Bertus Smit	211	−5	4 strokes	(Australia) David Merriman	Royal Porthcawl
2008	(England) Peter Mitchell	213	−3	2 strokes	(Wales) Ian Woosnam	Conwy
2007	(England) Carl Mason (2)	210	−6	2 strokes	(Scotland) Ross Drummond (Spain) Juan Quirós	Conwy
Firstplus Wales Seniors Open
2006	(Spain) José Rivero	212	−4	1 stroke	(Spain) Juan Quirós (England) David J. Russell (Scotland) Sam Torrance (France) Géry Watine	The Vale
Ryder Cup Wales Seniors Open
2005	(England) Carl Mason	202	−5	5 strokes	(New Zealand) Bob Charles (Republic of Ireland) Denis O'Sullivan	Royal St David's
2004	(United States) Ray Carrasco	203	−4	1 stroke	(United States) David Oakley	Royal St David's
2003	(Scotland) Bill Longmuir	199	−8	3 strokes	(United States) David Oakley	Royal St David's
Wales Seniors Open
2002	(Japan) Seiji Ebihara	203	−4	3 strokes	(England) Denis Durnian (Republic of Ireland) Christy O'Connor Jnr	Royal St David's
2001	(England) Denis Durnian	208	+1	1 stroke	(United States) Jay Horton	Royal St David's
