= Thomas baronets of Wenvoe (1694) =

Escutcheon of the Thomas baronets of Wenvoe

The Thomas baronetcy, of Wenvoe in the County of Glamorgan, was created in the Baronetage of England on 24 December 1694 for John Thomas, High Sheriff of Gloucestershire in 1699, with special remainder to his brothers Edmund and William.

The 3rd Baronet represented Chippenham and Glamorganshire in the House of Commons. The 10th Baronet was admitted to the Privy Council in 1958.

== Thomas baronets, of Wenvoe (1694) ==
- Sir John Thomas, 1st Baronet (died 1703)
- Sir Edmond Thomas, 2nd Baronet (1667–1723)
- Sir Edmond Thomas, 3rd Baronet (1712–1767)
- Sir Edmond Thomas, 4th Baronet (c. 1742–1789)
- Sir John Thomas, 5th Baronet (1749–1828)
- Sir John Godfrey Thomas, 6th Baronet (1784–1841)
- Sir Edmond Stephen Thomas, 7th Baronet (1810–1852)
- Sir Godfrey John Thomas, 8th Baronet (1824–1861)
- Sir Godfrey Vignoles Thomas, 9th Baronet (1856–1919)
- Sir Godfrey John Vignoles Thomas, 10th Baronet (1889–1968)
- Sir Godfrey Michael David Thomas, 11th Baronet (1925–2003)
- Sir David John Godfrey Thomas, 12th Baronet (born 1961)

There is no heir to the title.
