= Thomas baronets of Llanmihangel (1642) =

Escutcheon of Thomas of Michael's Town, County Glamorgan

The Thomas baronetcy, of Llanmihangel or Michaelstown in the County of Glamorgan, was created in the Baronetage of England on 3 March 1642 for Edward Thomas, High Sheriff of Glamorganshire in 1633. He was the son of the barrister Thomas ap Gwillim. The seat Llanmihangel Place in the Vale of Glamorgan is described by Cokayne as "Michael's Ville, anglice Michael's town"; and also Thomas's background as "of Bettws in Tir-y-jarll, and of Llanvihangel". According to the History of Parliament, he "took up arms for the King, briefly and disastrously, in February 1646."

The 2nd Baronet, Robert Thomas, sat as Member of Parliament for Cardiff. The title became extinct on his death in 1685.

== Thomas baronets, of Llanmihangel (Michaelstown) (1642) ==
- Sir Edward Thomas, 1st Baronet (died 1673)
- Sir Robert Thomas, 2nd Baronet (c. 1622–1685)
