= The Devil's Daughter =

Devil's Daughter may refer to:

== Films ==
- The Devil's Daughter (1915 film), a lost 1915 American silent drama film directed by Frank Powell
- The Devil's Daughter (1939 film), a 1939 American film directed by Arthur H. Leonard
- The Devil's Daughter (1946 film), a 1946 French crime film directed by Henri Decoin
- The Devil's Daughter (1973 film), a 1973 American made-for-television horror film
- The Devil's Daughter (1991 film), a 1991 Italian horror film co-written and produced by Dario Argento

== Music ==
- "Devil's Daughter", the third song on Uriah Heep's 1975 album Return to Fantasy
- "Devil's Daughter (Holy War)", the second song on Ozzy Osbourne's 1988 album No Rest for the Wicked
- "Devil's Daughter", the second song on Silvertide's 2004 album Show and Tell

== People ==
- Sharon Carr, Britain's youngest female murderer, dubbed "The Devil's Daughter" in the press

== Other ==
- The Devil's Daughter (painting), a 1917 painting by Welsh society artist Margaret Lindsay Williams
- Sherlock Holmes: The Devil's Daughter, an adventure mystery video game

== See also ==
- Devil Bat's Daughter
- "Devil's Son"
- Jean, the Soldier, and Eulalie, the Devil's Daughter, a mythical French story
- Lucy, the Daughter of the Devil, an animated show written and directed by Loren Bouchard
- Satana (Marvel Comics), a fictional character from Marvel related comics
- "Sorrow" (The McCoys song), which includes the line "Something tells me you're a devil's daughter"
- To the Devil a Daughter, a 1976 British-West German horror film
