= Clawdd Coch =

Hamlet in the Vale of Glamorgan, Wales

Coordinates: 51.49°N 3.361667°W

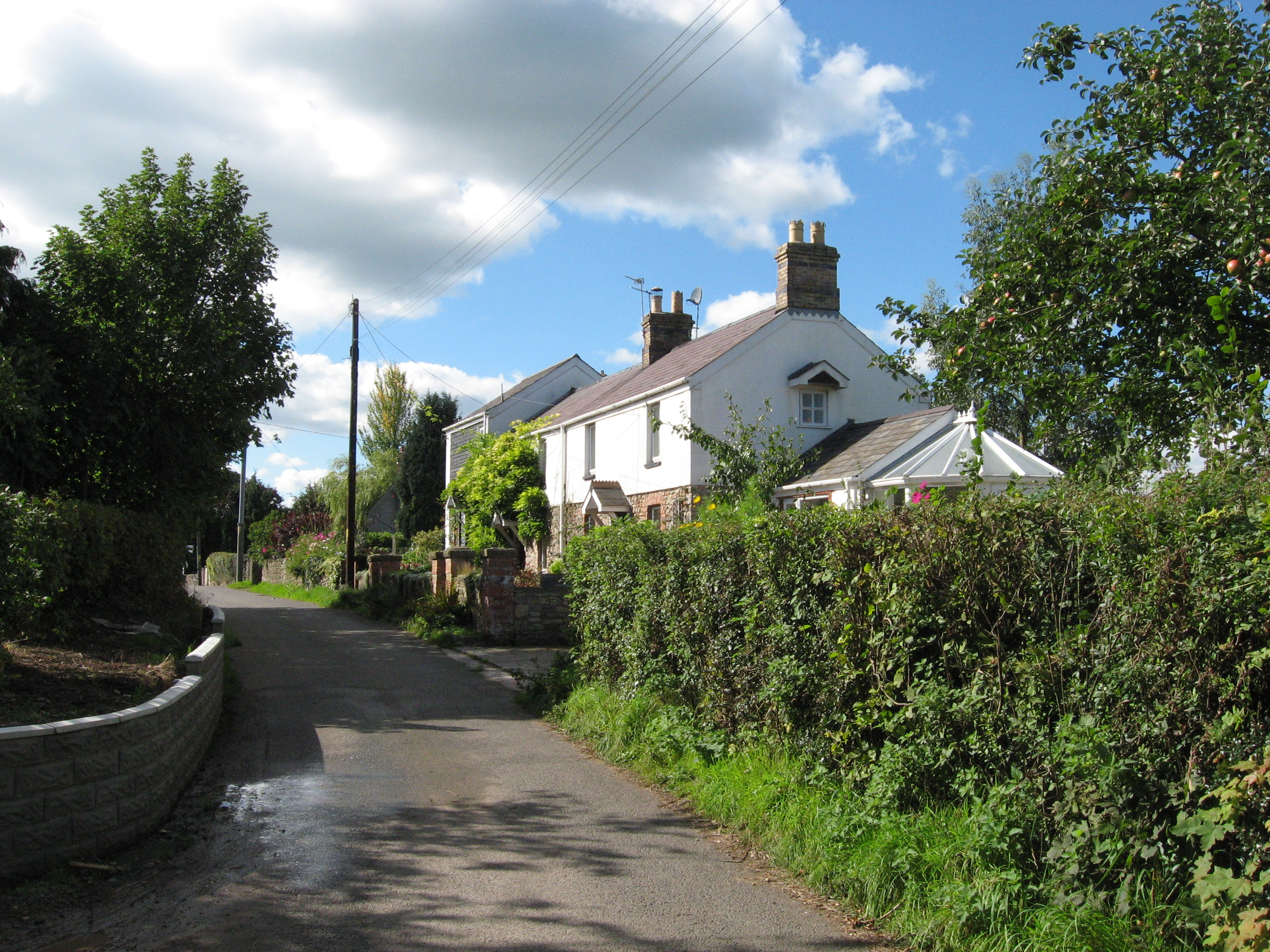

- Location within the Vale of Glamorgan
- OS grid reference: SJ2519
- Principal area: Vale of Glamorgan
- Preserved county: South Glamorgan
- Country: Wales
- Sovereign state: United Kingdom
- Postcode district: CF
- Police: South Wales
- Fire: South Wales
- Ambulance: Welsh
- UK Parliament: Vale of Glamorgan
- Senedd Cymru – Welsh Parliament: Vale of Glamorgan

Clawdd Coch (also Clawdd-côch or Clawddcoch) is a hamlet in the Vale of Glamorgan, Wales. It lies to the northeast of Tredodridge in the community of Pendoylan, and is near the edge of the Vale of Glamorgan Golf Club and Hensol Castle.

== Etymology ==
It translates as "Red Ridge", coch being the Welsh language word for "red".

== History ==
Clawdd Coch is documented as having some degree of importance as a Roman settlement and it is believed to be the final resting place of Ostorius. One of the roads leading into the hamlet was built by the Romans, and was known as Via Media. A notable smelting operation of lead and copper took place in the vicinity at what was known as "Dol-y-felin-blwm".

In the mid 19th century, the hamlet was owned by a Mr. Asterley who farmed the land here. Presumably he lived in what is Clawdd Coch guest house, a long farmhouse which was built in the 1650s. It was a favourite of Ivor Novello, who would often spend relaxing weekends here, to gain inspiration for his works. It underwent renovation in 1988.

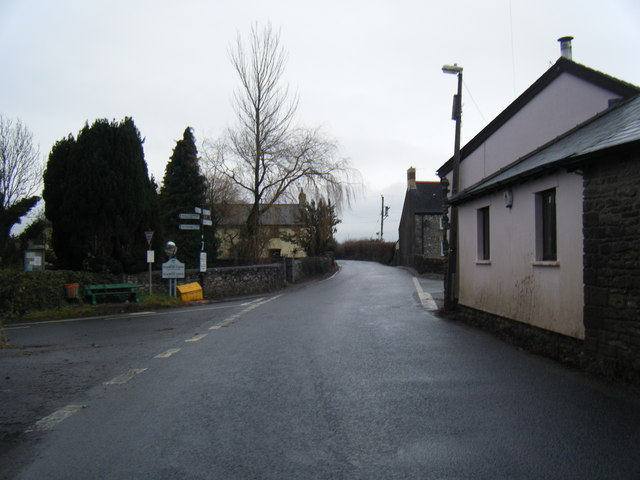

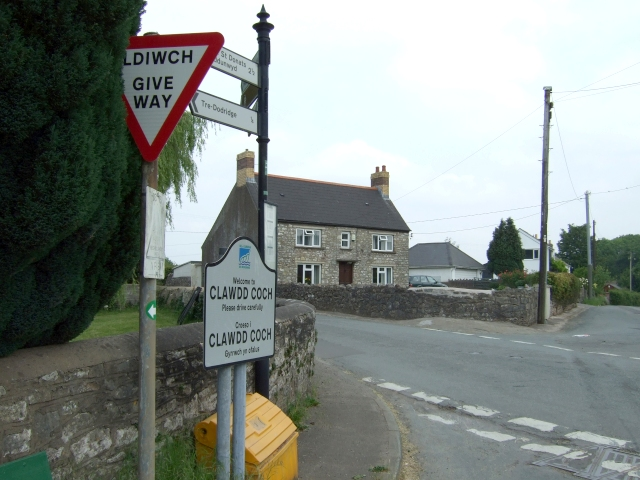
