= Samuel Richardson (High Sheriff) =

British justice of the peace and High Sheriff of Gloucestershire

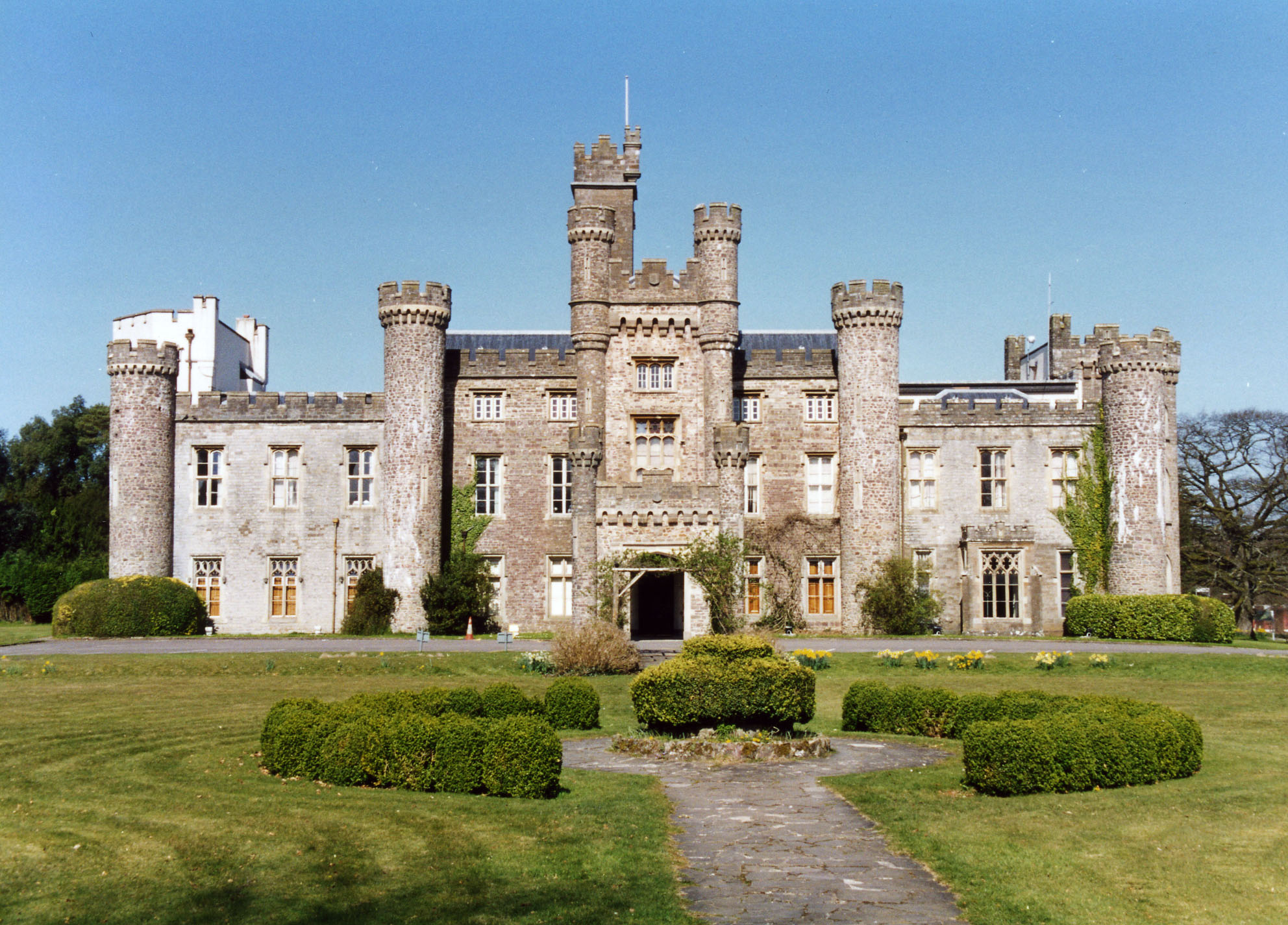
South elevation of Hensol Castle

Samuel Richardson (born 1738) was a British justice of the peace and High Sheriff of Gloucestershire in 1787 and Glamorganshire in 1798. He resided at Hensol Castle.
