= Leekes =

British furniture retailer

J.H. Leeke and Sons Limited
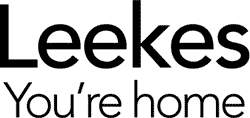
- Company type: Private company
- Industry: Retail
- Founded: 1897
- Headquarters: Talbot Green, Wales
- Website: www.leekes.co.uk

Leekes is a Welsh based retailer of home furnishings, home improvement goods and related items and services. The company was established in the Rhondda in 1897 and has six department stores in South Wales, South West England and the Midlands. The company also owns the Vale Resort in the Vale of Glamorgan and the adjacent Hensol Castle, a conference and wedding venue.

== History ==
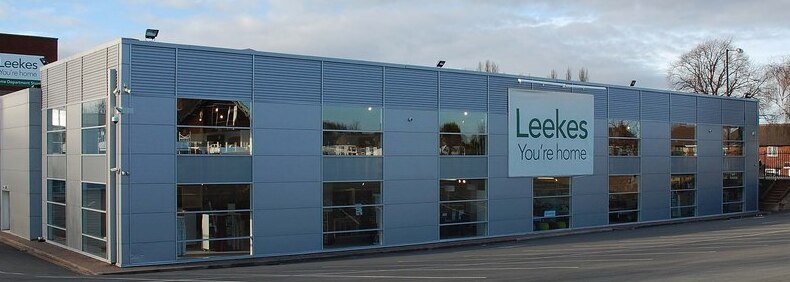
Leekes in Walsall

James Henry Leeke established Leekes as a blacksmith in Tonypandy in the Rhondda Valley, Wales in 1897. He operated a smithy for sharpening tools at the rear of the family home, a small terraced house in Clydach Vale, and then opened a small ironmongery business in the front room.

James' son Llewellyn took over the business from his father in 1933 at the age of 22. In 1948, Llewellyn bought a larger shop in Dunraven Street, Tonypandy; at this time the ironmonger and builders merchant was operated almost entirely by the family.

In the late 1960s, Llewellyn’s son Gerald joined the business full-time, extended the range at Dunraven Street and added kitchen and bathrooms displays, taking over the shop next door for an additional showroom. In 1965, the company turnover had reached £38,000 and the former goods station in Trealaw, Rhondda was acquired for expansion, combining the retail premises and builders yard with some car parking.

Leekes bought another Rhondda site in Talbot Green near Llantrisant and opened a store in 1977, described as a "DIY superstore".

In 2007, the eldest son of Llewellyn, David Leeke, wrote an account of the development of the Welsh business from the boom in the coal industry, through the Depression and two World Wars to the 21st century.

In 2009, Leekes bought out Midlands-based Cole's Home Furnishing, adding three stores in England: at Bilston near Wolverhampton, Bedworth near Coventry, and Fenton in Stoke-on-Trent. The Coventry store was sold in 2018. Only Bilston remains part of the Leekes group of stores.

Leekes bought Park Furnishers (Bristol) Limited in 2016, a family-run business with a furniture store in Bedminster, Bristol, which now operates from Eastgate Retail Park in the Eastville area of the city.

In 2024 Leekes opened its newest store on Kingsditch Retail Park in Cheltenham offering furniture, kitchens, bedrooms, home accessories and an in store coffee shop.

== Operations ==
Leekes remains a family business with many family members from the fourth generation. There are department stores in Wales at Cross Hands and Llantrisant, and a builders' merchant at Tonypandy. Stores in England are at Bilston, Melksham (Wiltshire), and Cheltenham. In addition, the Park Furnishers store in Bristol continues to trade under its own name.

The larger Leekes department stores in Llantrisant, Cross Hands and Melksham have departments including Kitchens, Bathrooms, Bedrooms, Furniture including Garden Furniture, Conservatories & Glazing, Home Decor and Lighting, Textiles, Cookware & Tableware, Garden Centre, DIY & Decorating, and a large range of clothing from a number of concessions.

The smaller stores offer a full range of furniture and home products without the home improvement elements such as DIY, Decorating, Garden Centre, Conservatories and Double Glazing. The Bilston store offers bathrooms but the Cheltenham store does not.

== Structure ==
The business was restructured in 2005 as a group of companies. Each of the trading companies, including the retailer Leekes Limited, is a wholly owned subsidiary of J.H. Leeke and Sons Limited.

=== The Vale Resort ===
In 1994, Leekes Retail and Leisure Group took ownership of a golf club in Hensol in the Vale of Glamorgan. This marked the start of diversification of the business into the leisure industry. The company then built and developed The Vale Resort, trading since 1999 as Vale of Glamorgan Hotel Limited. The site has a four-star hotel, a leisure club, Wales' largest spa and two championship golf courses set in over 650 acres (2.6 km^{2}) of parkland.

=== Hensol Castle ===
In 2003, the company purchased the Hensol Castle estate that adjoins the Vale resort. The estate includes a 17th-century stately home, an historically important mid-18th century landscaped park, a 15-acre (61,000 m^{2}) lake and serpentine pond. The castle is operated by Leekes Group Property Developments Limited as a conference centre and wedding venue.
