= Thomas baronets =

Set index for Thomas baronets

There have been six baronetcies created for persons with the surname Thomas, three in the Baronetage of England, one in the Baronetage of Great Britain and two in the Baronetage of the United Kingdom. As 2026 two of the creations are extant.

- Thomas baronets of Llanmihangel (1642)
- Thomas baronets of Folkington (1660): see Sir William Thomas, 1st Baronet (1641–1706)
- Thomas baronets of Wenvoe (1694)
- Thomas baronets of Yapton (1766)
- Thomas baronets of Garreglwyd (1918)
- Thomas baronets of Ynyshir (1919)
