= The Vale Resort =

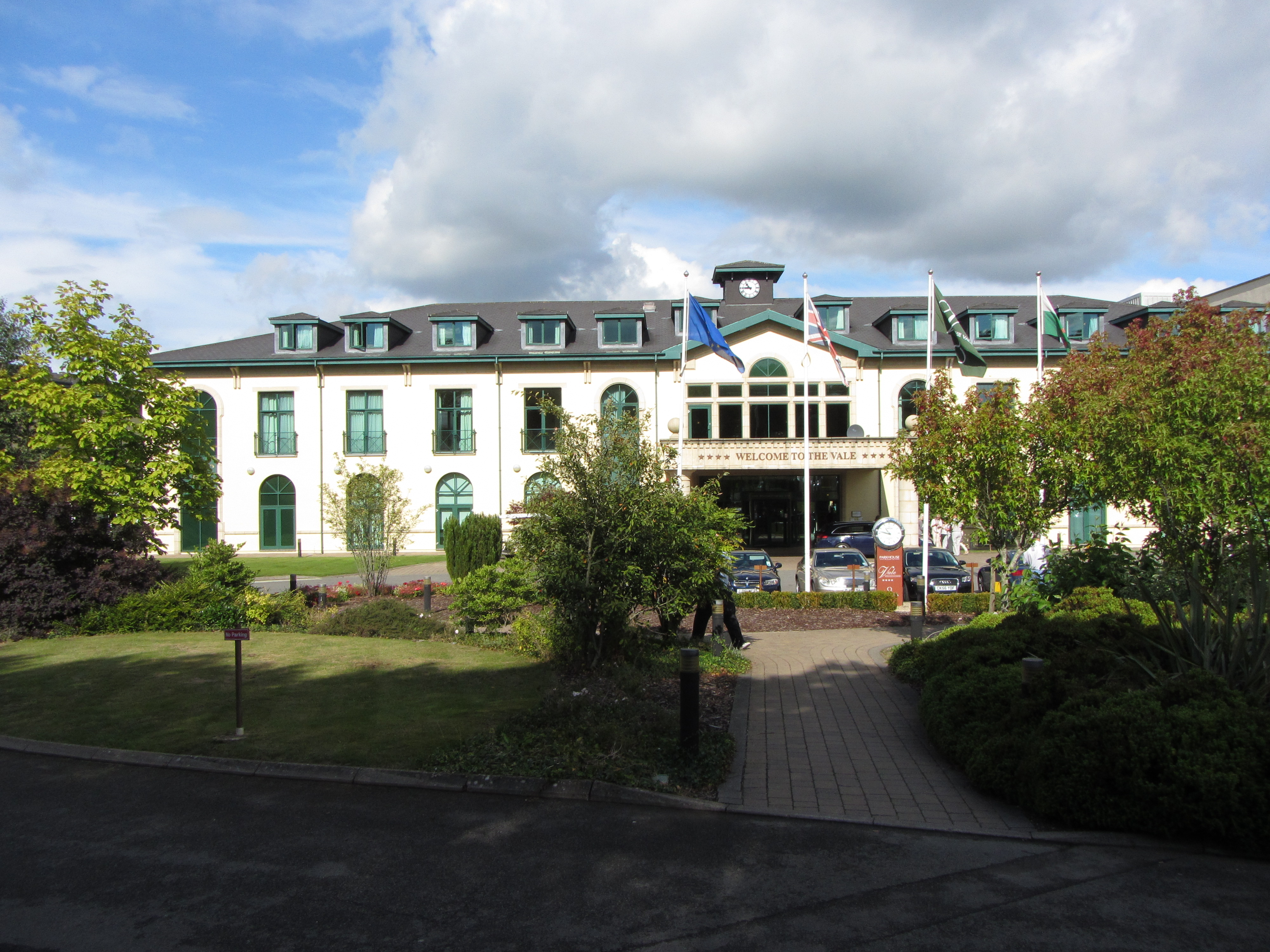
- Interactive map of the The Vale Resort area

General information
- Location: Hensol, Vale of Glamorgan, South Wales, Hensol Park, Hensol, Vale of Glamorgan CF72 8JY
- Coordinates: 51°29′43″N 3°22′39″W
- Owner: Leekes

Other information
- Number of rooms: 143
- Number of restaurants: 1

Website
- https://www.valeresort.com/

The Vale Resort is a golf, spa and leisure hotel and resort in the Vale of Glamorgan, south Wales. It consists of a hotel, spa, restaurant, two championship golf courses, golf clubhouse and a conference centre.

== History ==
The resort is located near Hensol Castle, in the Vale of Glamorgan, around 10 miles outside Cardiff city centre. Leekes, a retailer owned by Gerald Leeke, purchased the site, which at the time consisted of a 9-hole golf course, in 1994. Around this course, a golf clubhouse was opened, followed by a health club and spa facility in 1998, designed for 4,500 members. As of 2012, the spa is the largest in Wales.

The 143-bedroom hotel was opened in November 1999, along with an indoor sports training arena, in a partnership with the Welsh Rugby Union (WRU). The WRU continue to use the facility as their training base during domestic fixture periods such as the Six Nations Championship and Autumn internationals, and in 2009 the training facilities were developed further and relaunched as the WRU National Centre of Excellence, which includes three full-size outdoor rugby pitches as well as the indoor pitch and two administration blocks, where the national squad's backroom staff and the WRU's development and academy staff are based.

The Football Association of Wales also previously had its training base at the Vale Resort, and commissioned international standard practice football pitches which were built at the facility between 2005 and 2006. The facility was officially opened in 2009, by FIFA president Sepp Blatter. In 2011, at the request of then-Wales manager Gary Speed, the FAW moved the national team's training base to Newport's Celtic Manor Resort, resulting in a £15,000 compensation payout to the Vale Resort. The football facilities at the Vale continue to be used by Cardiff City FC, who share the Vale Pavilion building as their training headquarters with the Cardiff Blues regional rugby side.

In 2011, the resort made sales of £12 million.

== Golf ==
From the original 9-hole golf course, the facilities at the site have been developed into two championship golf courses. The Wales National is a par 73 course which opened in June 2003 and has hosted the Wales Challenge event on the Challenge Tour in 2005 and from 2007 to 2010, and the Wales Seniors Open on the European Seniors Tour in 2006. The Lake Course is a par 72 course, developed around a 20-acre lake at the site.
