= Wales Challenge =

Golf tournament

Tournament information
- Location: Cardiff, Wales
- Established: 2003
- Course: The Vale Resort
- Par: 72
- Length: 7,267 yards (6,645 m)
- Tour: Challenge Tour
- Format: Stroke play
- Prize fund: €150,000
- Month played: August
- Final year: 2010

Tournament record score
- Aggregate: 262 Graeme Storm (2004)
- To par: −26 as above

Final champion
- (Sweden) Oscar Florén
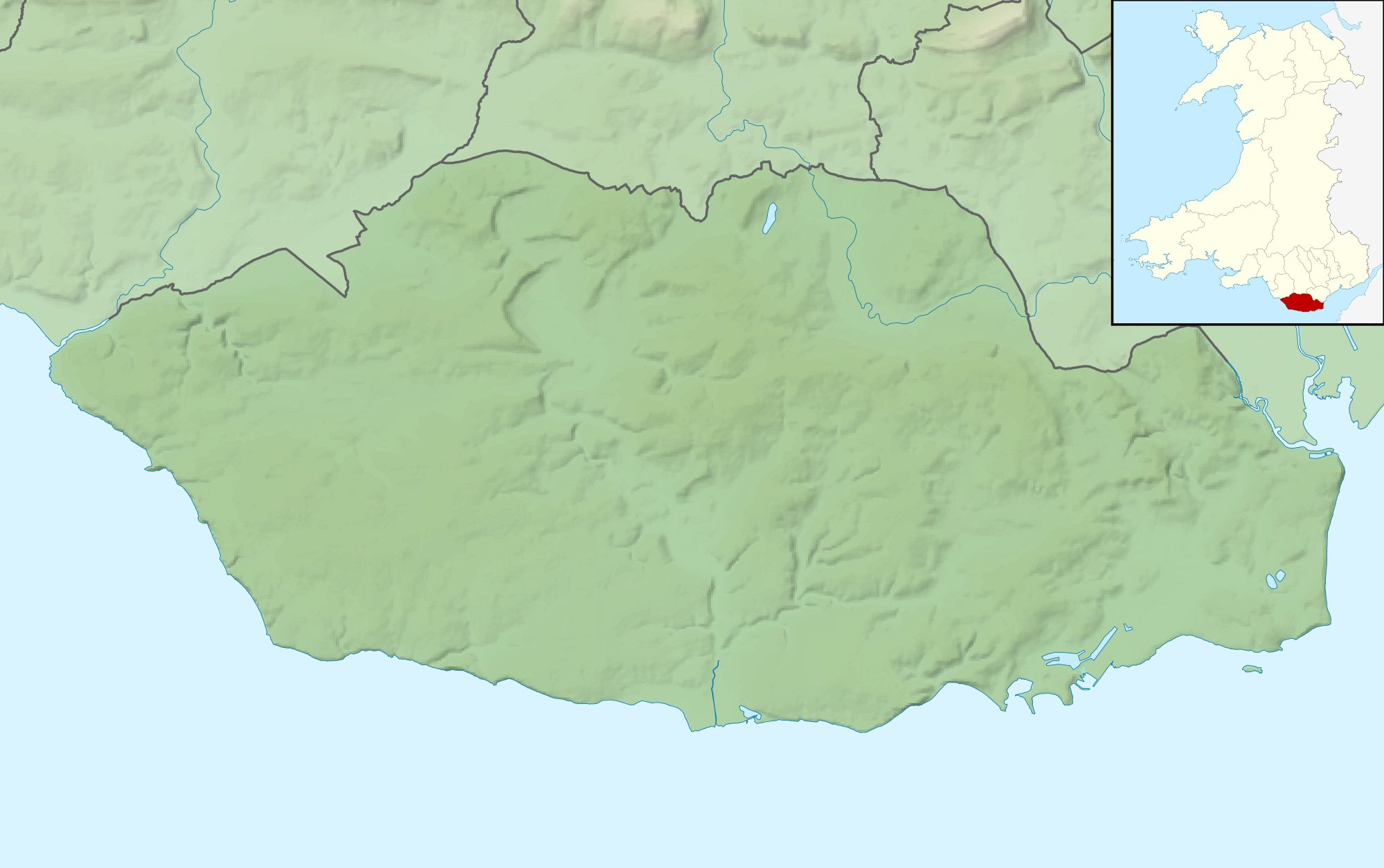
- Location in Wales Location in Vale of Glamorgan

The SWALEC Wales Challenge was a golf tournament on the Challenge Tour. It run annually from 2003 to 2010.

== Winners ==
Year	Winner	Score	To par	Margin of victory	Runner(s)-up	Venue
SWALEC Wales Challenge
2010	(Sweden) Oscar Florén	280	−8	1 stroke	(Scotland) Raymond Russell	The Vale Resort
2009	(Wales) Rhys Davies	286	−2	Playoff	(England) James Morrison	The Vale Resort
2008	(Republic of Ireland) Michael McGeady	284	−4	Playoff	(Sweden) Joel Sjöholm	The Vale Resort
Firstplus Wales Challenge
2007	(Republic of Ireland) Colm Moriarty	203 (Note: Shortened to 54 holes due to weather.)	−13	3 strokes	(Chile) Felipe Aguilar	The Vale Resort
Ryder Cup Wales Challenge
2006	(Wales) Sion Bebb	274	−10	1 stroke	(France) Jean-Baptiste Gonnet	Nefyn
Firstplus Wales Challenge
2005	(France) Olivier David	292	E	Playoff	(England) Iain Pyman	The Vale Resort
Ryder Cup Wales Challenge
2004	(England) Graeme Storm	262	−26	3 strokes	(England) Matthew King	Northop Country Park
2003	(Wales) Craig Williams	267	−17	Playoff	(England) Robert Coles (England) Robert Rock (England) Sam Walker	DeVere Northop Country Park
