= Margaret Lindsay Williams =

Welsh artist (1888–1960)

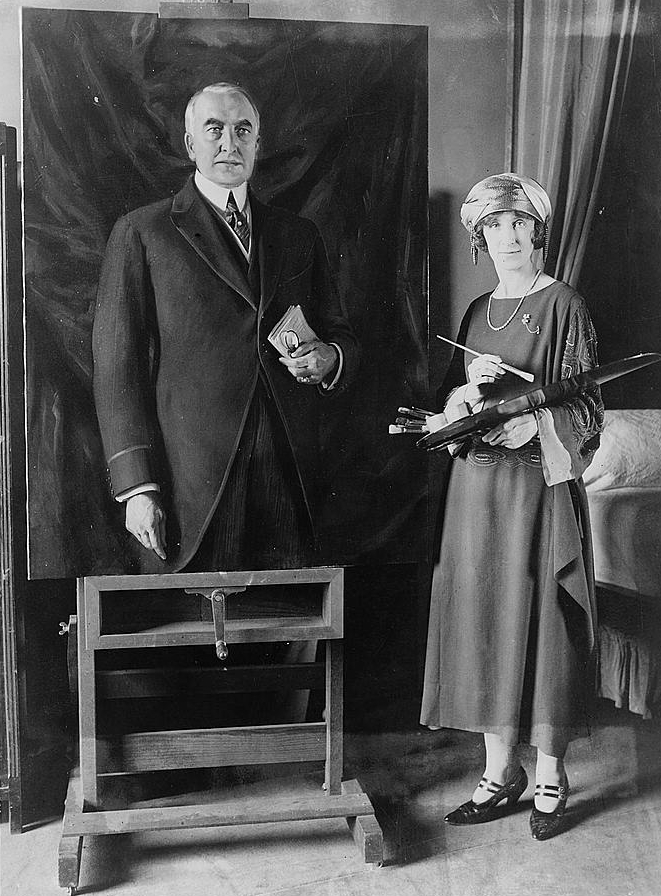
- Williams with her portrait of US President Warren G. Harding (c.1923)
- Born: 18 June 1888; Cardiff
- Died: 4 June 1960 (aged 71); London
- Education: Cardiff School of Art; Pelham Street School of Painting; Royal Academy School
- Known for: Portrait painting

Margaret Lindsay Williams (18 June 1888 – 4 June 1960) was a Welsh artist who was commissioned to paint portraits of the British royal family, European royalty and American presidents. She was best known as a portrait painter and painted portraits of Queen Alexandra, Queen Mary, Princess Margaret and at least five portraits of Queen Elizabeth II. She also painted President Warren Harding, Henry Ford and Field Marshal Slim. Although Williams gained considerable recognition and was famous in her lifetime, her work has been neglected since.

== Early life ==
Williams was born in Cardiff, the eldest of the two daughters of Samuel A. Williams, a shipbroker of Barry Docks and Martha Margaret Lindsay, who was of Scottish descent. For some years, from the age of 9, she lived in 9 Windsor Road, Barry.

Williams studied at Cardiff School of Art, winning a gold medal for art in 1904. In 1905 she enrolled at the Pelham Street School of Painting in Kensington to prepare for entering the Royal Academy in 1906. At the Royal Academy School she won several prizes including a gold medal in 1911 for her work The City of Refuge. At the time she was the youngest artist to win a gold medal at the School and the first from Wales to so. Also in 1911 she established, with funds provided by her father, her own studio at Eaton Terrace in St John's Wood. The following year she won a travel scholarship and, on the advice of John Singer Sargent, spent eighteen months studying in Italy and Holland. In March 1914 Williams held her first solo exhibition, showing some 58 paintings at the New Galleries in Cardiff.

== World War I ==
At the outbreak of World War I, Williams wrote and lobbied David Lloyd George for an appointment as an official war artist with the Welsh Division in France. While Lloyd-George thought it a good idea for the regiment to have an artist attached, he would not allow a woman to go that close to the front line and refused her request. Lloyd-George did support her application to work for the Ministry of Information but that also came to nothing. Williams did supply the illustrations for a 1915 prose anthology organised by Margaret Lloyd George to support the National Fund for Welsh Troops. The illustrations were of scenes from Welsh legends and Williams returned to this theme for her 1916 Royal Academy picture and for a 1917 illustrated book. In 1915 Williams organised an exhibition of her work in Cardiff to raise money for the Netley Military Hospital, which led to her receiving a number of commissions for very large works. These included Cardiff Royal Infirmary during the Great War painted in 1916 and her depiction of the scene in Cardiff City Hall when David Lloyd George unveiled a series of marble statues of Welsh heroes. This work included 114 individual portraits and involved several visits to Downing Street to paint Lloyd George and members of the Cabinet. Her largest single painting was of the Welsh National Service held in Westminster Abbey in June 1918 in support of the Welsh Prisoners of War Fund. Williams spent two years working on the 20 by 16-foot canvas in the Abbey itself before finding a studio large enough to accommodate the picture. She spent a further year on the work, which eventually included some 150 portraits, most notably of Queen Alexandra and her daughter Princess Victoria. The work was commissioned by the shipping magnate Lord Glanely who presented it to the City of Cardiff, where it still hangs in the city's Law Courts.

== Later works ==
By the end of World War I, Williams was a successful and established artist. During the War and the early 1920s, Williams painted a number of imaginative works with religious overtones, notably The Devil's Daughter in 1917, The Triumph in 1918, The Imprisoned Soul of 1920 and The Menace from 1925. In 1924 she completed a large painting The Care of Wounded Soldiers commissioned by Sir William James Thomas, who appears in the painting. It was initially hung in the Mametz Wood Ward of Cardiff Royal Infirmary but moved to the main foyer in the 1970s. It depicts a ward where an injured soldier is being treated by Sister Mary Jones. Others in the painting are matron Montgomery Wilson, who had served in a Boer War field hospital, private BJ Davies, a Welsh soldier evacuated from the western front, and senior surgeon Lt-Col Philip Rees Griffiths. When the hospital closed, the painting was stored in poor conditions. It was later loaned to the Royal Military Academy at Sandhurst where it now hangs in Robertson Hall.

By the mid-1920s Williams had decided to concentrate on portrait work. She received a steady stream of commissions and although based in London, painted the portraits of several generations of prominent Welsh families including several members of the Morgan family, owners of the Cardiff department store, and of the Novello Davies family, including Ivor Novello. In London she had a patron in Lord Riddell, who sat for four portraits and obtained other commissions for her. Most notable of these was the large scale work, St Paul's Cathedral Thanksgiving Service, shown at the Royal Academy in 1933 and painted to mark the re-opening of the Cathedral after five years of restoration work. This large group portrait included both George V and Queen Mary. Williams painted a further portrait of Queen Mary in 1938 for St Thomas' Hospital and among her other royal commissions were portraits of Princess Margaret, presented to South Africa by a businessman in 1937, Prince Charles, Princess Anne and at least five portraits of Queen Elizabeth II, including one of her as a young Princess. Williams visited the United States at least five times during her life and in 1922 was commissioned to paint a near life-size portrait of President Warren Harding. Other notable commissions included portraits of Henry Ford, Field Marshal Slim and the decorative scheme for the Cardiff home of Sir William James.

Williams exhibited with the South Wales Art Society throughout her life and although she became a Vice-President of the Society in 1931 she only infrequently visited Wales after 1934, when her parents moved to London. Although her house in Hamilton Terrace in St Johns Wood was the location of several parties and receptions, particularly when she had new works to show, Williams otherwise appears to have led a somewhat solitary existence and never married. She maintained a somewhat academic and formal style to her paintings, although there was often an energetic quality to her portraits, and she avoided being influenced by developments in the contemporary art world. Williams was a lifelong Welsh Congregationalist and her funeral took place in the Windsor Road Congregational Church in Barry and she is buried in Merthyr Dyfan Cemetery in Barry. A Blue plaque commemorating Williams' connection with the town has been placed on 9 Windsor Road, Barry.
