= Edward Clarke (Lord Mayor of London) =

English merchant and Lord Mayor of London

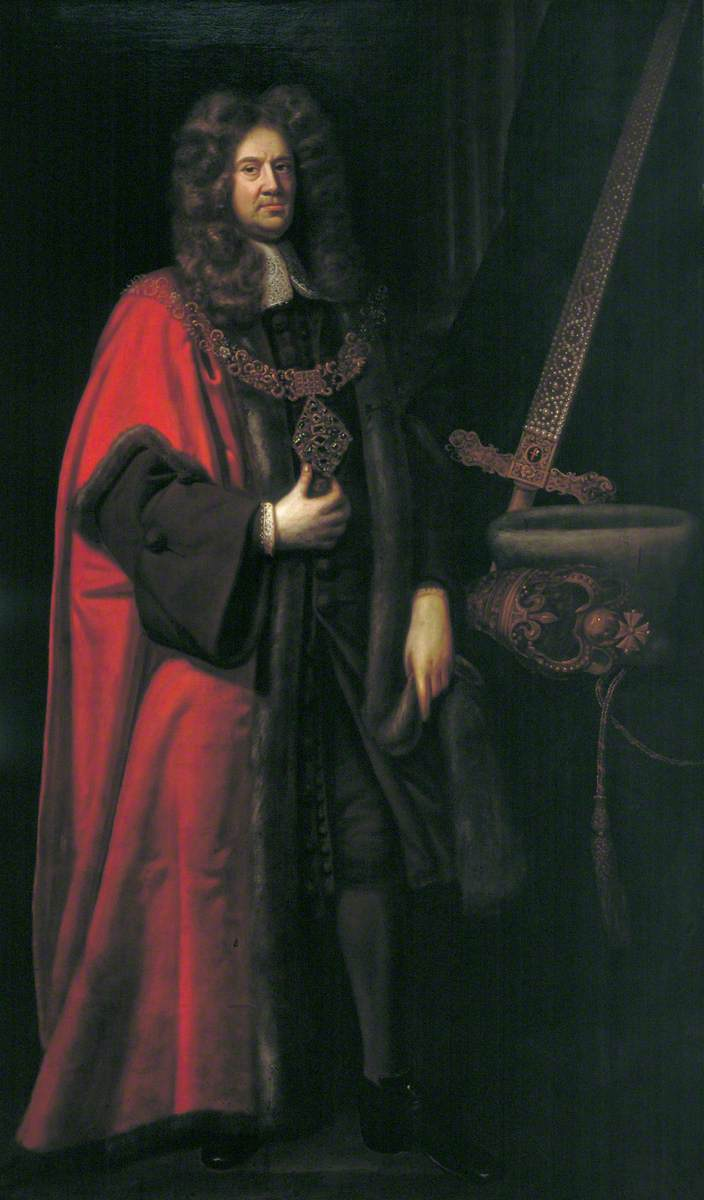

Lord Mayor of London
- In office 1696–1697
- Preceded by: Sir John Houblon
- Succeeded by: Sir Humphrey Edwin

Personal details
- Died: 1703
- Spouse(s): Elizabeth Gough; Jane Clutterbuck
- Children: Thomas and Jane
- Parent: Thomas Clarke (father)

Sir Edward Clarke (died 1703), of Brickendon, Hertfordshire, was an English merchant who served as Lord Mayor of London in the year 1696 to 1697.

== Biography ==
Clarke was born at Heighington, Lincolnshire, the son of Thomas Clarke, yeoman of Heighington. In 1645 he was apprenticed to his uncle, George Clarke, a mercer of Cheapside, and became a successful merchant.

His first wife was Elizabeth Gough, daughter of Rev. Thomas Gough, a Puritan clergyman, of St Sepulchre. Before 1672, he married, as his second wife, Jane Clutterbuck, daughter of Richard Clutterbuck.

He was a member of the Worshipful Company of Merchant Taylors and in 1675, he became a Common Councillor for the City of London ward of Farringdon Within. In 1677, he was a silkman, and merchant in partnership with Henry Sherbrooke. In 1682, he acquired the Liberty of Brickendon three miles from Hertford from Sir William Soame, 1st Baronet. The manor was ‘considered “one of the delightful seats of this neighbourhood, having to the front a dry pleasant soil towards Hertford, and on the contrary view woods at half a mile distance, with vistas all pointing to the House’ Clarke was probably responsible for the earliest and most imposing part of the mansion.

Clarke was Deputy from 1682 to 1683 and in 1688 and 1689. He was elected Alderman for Bread Street ward on 1 October 1689, and was knighted on 29 October 1689. In 1690, he was elected Sheriff of London, when he was described as ‘of the same temper with the mayor’ Sir Thomas Pilkington suggesting he was a strong Whig, possibly with dissenting sympathies. He was also Master of the Merchant Taylors for the year 1690 to 1691. In 1694 he was elected Director of the Bank of England. He became Lord Mayor for the year 1696 to 1697.

Clarke died on 1 September 1703 and was buried at St Mathew Friday Street. His son Thomas, who was MP for Hertford, inherited Brickendon. His daughter Jane married Maynard Colchester.

Civic offices
Preceded by Sir John Houblon	Lord Mayor of London; 1696–1697	Succeeded by Sir Humphrey Edwin
