= Sir Robert Thomas, 2nd Baronet =

Welsh politician (c.1622–1685/1706)

Sir Robert Thomas, 2nd Baronet (c.1622-1685? or 1706?) was a Welsh politician who sat in the House of Commons of England from 1661 to 1681. He was knighted and succeeded as baronet in 1673 upon his father's death.

== Life ==
=== Early life ===
Robert Thomas was the second son and heir of Sir Edward Thomas, 1st Baronet of Llanmihangel and Bettws (in English: Michaelstown), Glamorgan, Wales and his wife, Susan Morgan, daughter of Thomas Morgan of Rhiwperra (1564-1645, MP). Robert's older brother, William, died before 1665. Younger brothers and sisters include John Thomas (c.1630-a.1676), Lt. Col. Lewis (Lewys) Thomas, Esq (??-1648), Humphrey Thomas (c.1627-1679), Anne (c. 1634-1694, second wife to Sir Thomas Nott, becoming Lady Anne Nott), and Susanna (c.1632-1682), married Dr. John Butler, Canon of Windsor Castle).

=== Family ===
Robert Thomas married Mary Jenkins around c.1654, the daughter of Judge David Jenkins, of Hensol. With Mary, he had four children. Edward Thomas (??-before 1677), Mary (a.k.a. Maud, 1651-a.1702, married Marmaduke Gibbs, Esq.), Susannah (??-1747, married Robert Savours), and Capt. Robert Thomas (1654-1691; Jesus College, Oxford, B.A. 1675, M.A. 1678, Fellow 1677-1685, matr. Lincoln's Inn 1676; married Catherine Acton in 1689; died at Battle of Aughrim, Ireland).

In London, Robert Thomas either had a second marriage ("Lady Anne his wife" appears in birth records of the Parish of St. Giles in the Fields) or a mistress ("his own whore"). With "Lady Anne", he had three children: Ann Thomas (1672-1742, married Richard Allen on 25 Jul 1694 O.S.), Francis Thomas (1675-1695), and Susannah (1676-??, married Robert Hutchins). Francis Thomas was murdered in London on 22 Feb. 1694/5 O.S. Lady Anne was buried in the Parish of St. Giles in the Fields on 10 Sep. 1684, "...from the [Liberty of the] Mint, Southwark", which is near the King's Bench Prison where, at the time, Sir Robert was incarcerated for debt ("within the rules" of the prison, meaning outside the prison building but within region immediately around the prison. See Marshalsea - Master's Side).

=== Member of Parliament ===
In 1661, Robert Thomas was elected Member of Parliament for Cardiff in the Cavalier Parliament. He succeeded to the baronetcy upon the death of his father in 1673. He was re-elected MP for Cardiff in the two elections of 1679—in March 1679 for the short-lived Habeas Corpus Parliament (a.k.a. First Exclusion Parliament), and in September 1679 for the Exclusion Bill Parliament. The latter was summoned on 24 July 1679 O.S., but prorogued by the king so that it did not assemble until 21 October 1680 O.S. It was dissolved three months later on 18 January 1680/81 O.S.

=== Offices ===
He was a Gentleman of the Privy Chamber of Charles II in 1660-1684, serving in the Lady Quarter (25 March - 24 June).

=== Later life and death ===
Heavily in debt (est. £15,000-£20,000), Sir Robert Thomas was imprisoned in the King's Bench Prison, c. 1684-1685. He finally sold his property in Glamorgan, Wales (Plas Llanmihangel, Bettws, Flemingston) to Humphrey Edwin for £12,812 in 1685. The last record of Sir Robert Thomas was on 29 Apr 1685 at the King's Bench Prison, when he signed a petition in support of Titus Oates, the notorious promoter of the Popish Plot.

Though the circumstances of his death and burial are not known, evidence from a court case suggests that Sir Robert Thomas died before the end of 1685 (Old Style). However, the Parish register of St. Katherine by the Tower lists a burial of "Sir Robert Thomas, Knight" on 15 May 1706, with burial fees paid by Sir Humphrey Edwin, one year before his death. Sir Robert's cause of death was listed as "Aged". There is no trace of Sir Robert in the public record from 1685 to 1706. Following his death, the baronetcy became extinct.

== Politics ==
Sir Robert's political and economic fortunes were intertwined. His Whig/anti-Catholic politics seem to have originated in resentment for his family's poor treatment as Royalists during the English Civil War and Interregnum. (His father, Sir Edward Thomas, suffered financial hardship and became indebted, while his father-in-law, Judge David Jenkins, suffered physical and emotional hardship of being tried for sedition and imprisoned in the Tower of London for 7 years.) A second factor was rivalry between and within gentry families in Wales. Many gentry families, including the Thomases, had Catholics in their extended family. These rivalries and conflicts formed along lines of religion, political power and intrigue, economic power, and personal dislikes. A third factor shaping his politics was friendships and alliances formed with prominent Whigs and anti-Catholics in Wales and London, including John Arnold, Sir Trevor Williams, Ford, Lord Grey, and Popish Plot conspirator Titus Oates. Though not on any published list, Robert Thomas was probably a member of the Green Ribbon Club. He became an ally (if not a trusted friend) of the Whig leader Anthony, Earl of Shaftesbury. In Shaftesbury's evaluation of allies and enemies (May 1677), he only rated Thomas as "worthy" rather than "doubly worthy" or "thrice worthy". On top of these factors, Sir Robert's extremism was probably fueled by his dire financial condition in the 1670s and 1680s, i.e., such political actions could be used against enemies and to curry favor with powerful friends.

== Anti-Catholic activism and involvement in the Popish Plot ==
In 1678-81, while a Member of Parliament, Sir Robert Thomas became embroiled in the anti-Catholic Popish Plot as an antagonist and accuser.

== Reputation ==
Sir Robert Thomas was a controversial person with a mixed reputation in his home county of Glamorgan, Wales, and London. He was described variously as a "royalist sufferer", "unmannerly behaviour" towards King Charles II and the Duke of York, a "dubious ally", a political "extremist" of the Country Party/Whig and anti-Catholic sort, an "isolated adventurer" rather than a Party loyalist, and a wealthy business person with "no sense".

Regarding positive traits, Robert Thomas was friends with prominent literary people in London, including writer and antiquarian John Aubrey, playwright Thomas Shadwell, and poet and satirist Samuel Butler. On 27 Sept. 1680 O.S., Sir Robert was one of 25 friends attending the funeral of Samuel Butler at St. Paul's Covent Garden, and was a pallbearer along with Aubrey and Shadwell. Being a pallbearer is a notable act of friendship, in part because Butler "died in want" (poverty) and was no longer a popular figure.

The following episodes convey some of his negative traits and relationships.

In 1671, his father, Sir Edward Thomas, 1st Baronet, filed a petition with the House of Commons, complaining of "Miscarriages, Frauds and Abuses, committed by his said Son". Robert Thomas denied the allegations and claimed he was falsely accused. After a committee investigation, the House took no action.

In 1677, Sir Edward Mansel of Margam, also an MP, wrote private notes on the gentry of Glamorgan, and it included the following entry (spelling in original, clarification in square brackets):

A. Sir Robert Thomas of Languchangell [ Plas Llanmihangel ], Baronett
B. [Estates] £1700 if cleare
C. Aged 55. A man of great business but no sence
D. [Inclination as to the government] Known in his country as well as abroad
E. [Wife, children] First, Judge Jenkins' daughter 1 sone 1 daughter -- Last, his own whore, 2 children

In c.1684, a poem by an unknown author lampooning the gentry of Glamorgan included the following stanza with Sir Robert Thomas as subject

Sir Robert the ass
I will not let pass
But give the devil his due
He never was good
To the next of his blood
To his wife nor his king never true.

The lines "He never was good / To the next of his blood" apparently referred to the conflict he had with his father, mentioned above.

== Sources ==
Jenkins, Phillip (1983), The Making of a Ruling Class: The Glamorgan Gentry 1640-1790, Cambridge: Cambridge University Press.

Naylor, Leonard (2020), "THOMAS, Robert (c.1622-aft.1684), of Cowbridge and Llanfihangel Plas, Glam.", History of Parliament Online. Retrieved 26 Dec. 2020

Thomas, Helen M. (1997) "Llanmihangel, near Cowbridge: A tale of family fortunes and misfortunes". Morgannwg Transactions of the Glamorgan Local History Society, Vol. 41, p. 8-37. Retrieved 26 Dec. 2020

Parliament of England
Preceded by William Bassett	Member of Parliament for Cardiff; 1661–1681	Succeeded by Bussy Mansell
Baronetage of England
Preceded by Edward Thomas	Baronet (of Michaelstown); 1673–c.1680s	Extinct
