= Humphrey Edwin =

English merchant and Lord Mayor of London

Lord Mayor of London
- In office 1697–1698
- Preceded by: Sir Edward Clarke
- Succeeded by: Sir Francis Child

Personal details
- Born: 1642
- Died: 1707 (aged 64–65)
- Spouse: Elizabeth Sambrooke
- Children: 9, including Samuel
- Parents: William Edwin (father); Anne Edwin (mother)

Sir Humphrey Edwin (1642–1707) was an English merchant and Lord Mayor of London for the year 1697 to 1698.

== Early life ==
Edwin was born at Hereford, the only son of William Edwin, twice mayor of Hereford, by his wife, Anne, of the family of Mansfield. He came to London, and in or before 1670 married Elizabeth, the daughter of Samuel Sambrooke, a wealthy London merchant of the ward of Bassishaw, and sister of Sir Jeremy Sambrooke. He began business as a merchant in Great St. Helen's. He later moved to the neighbouring parish of St. Peter-le-Poor, where his son Samuel was living at the time of his marriage in September 1697. Marriage and success in trade (probably as a wool merchant) brought him wealth.

== In office under James II ==
In 1678 he was admitted a freeman of the Barber-Surgeons' Company by redemption, becoming afterwards an assistant of the company, and master in 1688. In 1694, however, he was dismissed from the office of assistant for his continued non-attendance at the court meetings. He afterwards became a member of the company of Skinners. Edwin was a nonconformist; James II was anxious to conciliate the dissenters, and on 11 October 1687 he was sworn in as alderman of Tower ward, on the direct appointment of the king, in the place of Sir John Chapman, discharged by the royal mandate. On 18 November the king knighted him at Whitehall, and a few weeks later appointed him High Sheriff of Glamorgan for the ensuing year. It was probably before this that he had purchased the estate and mansion of Llanmihangel Place in Glamorganshire, from Sir Robert Thomas, bart., the last of a line of manorial lords of that name.

In August 1688 Edwin was chosen Sheriff of London and Middlesex, entering upon his duties on 11 October following. The year was an eventful one. In December Edwin, with his colleague and the aldermen of London, attended the Prince of Orange on his entry into London, and took part in February in the proclamation of the king and queen in Cheapside and at the Royal Exchange. On 25 October Edwin was elected alderman of the ward of Cheap, in succession to William Kiffen, the Baptist minister, who suffered under James II, but he again moved, 22 October 1689, to Tower ward, which he continued to represent until his death.

He and six others were appointed by the king, in April 1689, commissioners of excise, but in the following September all were dismissed excepting Edwin and Sir Henry Ashurst, and other wealthy citizens were appointed in their place. Edwin continued to hold the office until April 1691.

== Under William and Mary ==
Edwin took a prominent part in the military affairs of the city. Besides being an officer of the Honourable Artillery Company, he became captain of the regiment of horse volunteers, a corps of four hundred citizens, established in July 1689 and maintained at their own expense, with the king as their colonel and the Earl of Monmouth as lieutenant-colonel. He was also colonel of a regiment of the trained bands; but in March 1690, on the churchmen becoming a majority in the court of lieutenancy, Edwin and five other aldermen who held nonconformist opinions, were turned out, and five others belonging to the church party chosen in their places.

In the following year Edwin was the victim of a prosecution conducted by Sir Bartholomew Shower. He was indicted for perjury, and a true bill found against him in November 1691 by the grand jury of Ossulston Hundred in Middlesex; but on his trial in the following February he was acquitted. In a contemporary pamphlet the prosecution is described as 'so unjust that the L. C. J. Holt, seeing it proceeded from the depth of malice, would not suffer Sir Humphry to swear all his witnesses, there being no need of any further proofs at his trial'.

== Lord Mayor and controversy ==
Edwin owned extensive property in Westminster, adjoining Westminster Hall and the clock house. He also had a town house at Kensington, and added to his Glamorganshire property by the possession of the castle and lordship of Ogmore, the lease of which was renewed to him in 1702. In September 1697 Samuel, the eldest son of Sir Humphrey, was married to Lady Catherine Montague, daughter of the Earl of Manchester, and on the 30th of the same month Edwin was elected Lord Mayor of London, the customary mayoralty pageant being omitted, owing perhaps to his religious principles. Shortly after his accession to office (6 November 1697) William III, who returned home after the treaty of Ryswick, made a magnificent public entry into London. The reception was the grandest spectacle witnessed in the city since the English Restoration.

=== Attendance at nonconformist gatherings ===
Soon after his election Edwin gave offence by attending a nonconformist worship on the afternoons of Sunday, 31 October and 7 November, in full civic state. A meeting of the court of aldermen was held on Tuesday, 9 November, to consider a complaint of the sword-bearer against the lord mayor for compelling his attendance on the occasion: Edwin had been deserted by all his officers except the sword-bearer, who was locked in a pew. His lordship promised to forbear the practice for the future, and it was ordered 'that the like practice shall not be used for the time to come'. A letter written 11 November states that the meeting-house attended by the lord mayor was More's. Walter Wilson and others state that it was Pinners' Hall; a contemporary skit, 'A Dialogue between Jack and Will,' describes it as Salters' Hall. Gilbert Burnet states that the bill for preventing occasional conformity had its origin in Edwin's state visit to Pinners' Hall (Hist. V. 49).

=== Contemporary reactions ===
Edwin's actions roused the High Church party, brought out the pamphleteers, and caused a longer literary controversy.

A young clergyman named Edward Oliver, preaching before Edwin in St. Paul's Cathedral towards the close of his mayoralty (22 October 1698), declaimed against the nonconformist mode of worship. The sermon soon appeared in print and was answered by a pamphlet, of which two editions were published, entitled 'A Rowland for an Oliver, or a Sharp Rebuke for a Saucy Levite.... By a Lover of Unity.' Edwin had also to face the ridicule of the stage and the lampoons of the wits of the day. Two brochures were preserved in the Guildhall Library: 'A Dialogue betwixt Jack and Will concerning the Lord Mayor's going to Meeting-houses, with the Sword carried before him,' London, 1697, and 'The Puritanical Justice, or the Beggars turn'd Thieves,' London, 1698.

William Penkethman, in his comedy of Love without Interest, 1699, made the following allusion: 'If you'll compound for a catch, I'll sing you one of my Lord Mayor's going to Pin-makers Hall to hear a sniveling non-conseparatist divine divide and subdivide into the two and thirty points of the compass.' Jonathan Swift, in his Tale of a Tub, by way of satirising the toleration of dissenters, states that Jack's tatters are coming into fashion both in court and city, and describes Edwin under the name of Jack getting upon a great horse and eating custard. A satiric print illustrating the text is given in the fifth edition of the Tale of a Tub; the scene is Ludgate Hill, showing the gate, with St. Paul's Cathedral in the background. Daniel Defoe wrote a pamphlet bearing the title 'An Enquiry into the Occasional Conformity of Dissenters in Cases of Preferment; with a Preface to the Lord Mayor, occasioned by his carrying the Sword to a Conventicle,' London, 1697.

In the longer run, William Nicholls attacked nonconformism in his Apparatus for the Defensio Ecclesiae Anglicanae, and was answered by James Peirce (Vindication of the Dissenters, pt. i. p. 276) and by Edmund Calamy (Abridgment, i. 561).

=== End of term ===
The remainder of Edwin's mayoralty passed off without event. Many corporate offices fell vacant during the year, by which he received the sum of £4,000. Towards the end of May he temporarily retired through illness, with the king's leave, to his house at Kensington, Sir Robert Clayton filling his place in his absence.

== Death ==
Edwin died on 14 December 1707 at his seat in Llanmihangel, where a monument to his memory was set up in the parish church. His widow died in London on 22 November 1714, and was subsequently buried beside him at Llanmihangel.

== Legacy ==
He left no will, but administration was granted to his son Charles on 19 February 1708. Towards the erection of the London workhouse, which was begun in his mayoralty, he gave £100 and a pack of wool.

== Family ==
His four eldest children were: Samuel, baptised 12 March 1671; Humphrey, 24 February 1673; Thomas, 4 July 1676; and Charles, 7 February 1677 (St. Helen's, Bishopsgate, Reg. of Baptisms). Besides these, Edwin had four daughters and a fifth son, John, from whom were descended the later Earls of Crawford and Balcarres. His daughter Mary married Welsh MP Robert Jones.

Of his two sisters, Mary, the younger, became the wife of Sir Edward Dering, who in 1701 wrote a book bewailing her death entitled 'The most excellent Maria, in a brief character of her incomparable virtues and goodness.'

Civic offices
Preceded by Sir Edward Clarke	Lord Mayor of London; 1697–1698	Succeeded by Sir Francis Child
