= Thomas baronets of Ynyshir (1919) =

Escutcheon of the Thomas baronets of Ynyshir

The Thomas baronetcy, of Ynyshir in the County of Glamorgan, was created in the Baronetage of the United Kingdom on 10 May 1919 for the coalowner and philanthropist James Thomas. He equipped the Welsh National Medical School in Cardiff and also served as High Sheriff of Glamorganshire in 1936. His son, the 2nd Baronet, was a deputy lieutenant, and High Sheriff of Monmouthshire in 1973.

As of 2026 the title is marked vacant on the Official Roll.

== Thomas baronets, of Ynyshir (1919) ==
- Sir (William) James Thomas, 1st Baronet (1867–1945)
- Sir William James Cooper Thomas, 2nd Baronet (1919–2005)
- Sir William Michael Thomas, 3rd Baronet (1948–2025)
- Sir Toby James Thomas, 4th Baronet (born 1988). The title is vacant..
