= Sir William James Thomas, 1st Baronet =

Welsh industrialist and philanthropist

Sir William James Thomas
- Born: 10 March 1867
- Died: 3 January 1945 (aged 77)
- Spouse: Maud Cooper (m. 1917)
- Children: 3

Sir William James Thomas, 1st Baronet (10 March 1867 – 3 January 1945) was a Welsh industrialist and philanthropist. He was knighted in 1914 and created a baronet on 10 May 1919, under the title Baronet Thomas of Ynyshir.

== Biography ==
The grandson of a coalowner in the Rhondda Fach, James Thomas (died 1901), he lost both parents (Thomas and Jane Thomas) as a child, and was brought up by his grandparents. He inherited his grandfather's fortune, and became a director of the Great Western Railway, Barry Docks, and numerous other industrial concerns. He married Maud Mary Cooper (died 1952) in 1917, and they had three children:

- Maureen Elizabeth Jane Thomas, who married Joseph Gerald Gaskell in 1942 and had two children
- Sir William James Cooper Thomas, 2nd Baronet (1919–2005), who married Freida Dunbar Whyte and had three children
- Geoffrey George Mansel Thomas (1926–1989), who married Mary Wentworth Harries and had no children

In 1914, Sir William James Thomas sold his coal interests to United National Collieries Ltd, and thereafter made substantial donations to charitable causes, particularly medical causes. Among other things, his donations were instrumental in the establishment of the Welsh National School of Medicine, the first medical school in Wales.

He commissioned the large painting The Care of Wounded Soldiers by Margaret Lindsay Williams for Cardiff Royal Infirmary. He appears in the painting.

Baronetage of the United Kingdom
New creation	Baronet (of Ynyshir); 1919–1945	Succeeded by William Thomas
