= David Jenkins (Royalist) =

Welsh judge and Royalist

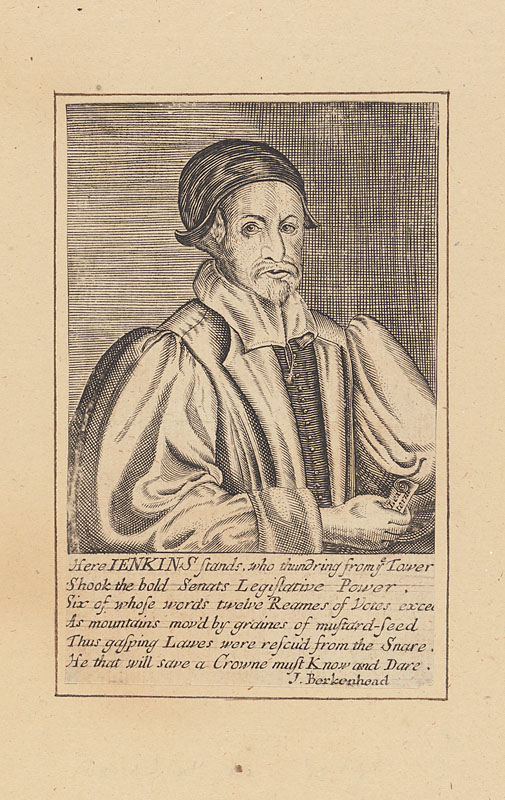
David Jenkins.

David Jenkins (1582 – 6 December 1663) was a Welsh judge and Royalist during the English Civil War.

== Life ==
Jenkins was born at Pendeulwyn (English: Pendoylan), Glamorgan, son of a well-established gentry family. He was educated at St Edmund Hall, Oxford, admitted to Gray's Inn on 5 November 1602 and called to the bar in 1609. In March 1643 he was appointed, against his will, as puisne judge of the Carmarthen circuit of the court of great sessions. He was a strong supporter of the Royalist cause in the civil war and, later that year, was involved in raising money for the siege of Gloucester. He indicted several prominent parliamentarians for high treason. Jenkins was captured by the parliamentarians in December 1645 in Hereford after the surprise attack on the city and imprisoned in the Tower of London, Newgate Prison and latterly in Wallingford and Windsor Castles. Whilst in prison in the 1640s, Jenkins wrote a number of political tracts which were collectively published in 1648 as: The Works of the Eminent and Learned Judge Jenkins upon divers Statutes concerning the King's Prerogative and the Liberty of the Subject.

Jenkins was brought before parliament in April 1647, but argued that it had no power to try him in the absence of the king. His arguments were expounded in his scholarly work, Lex Terrae which cited important authorities. The nub of his case, against the legitimacy of parliament in appointing justices and passing laws, was that such acts could only be performed with the explicit authority of the king and that the claim that the king was 'virtually' present in proceedings of the two Houses of Parliament was false.

On 22 February 1648, Jenkins was brought to the House of Commons to face charges including the writing of treasonous pamphlets. He refused to kneel at the bar of the house and was fined £1000 for contempt. In 1650 Jenkins was amongst other prisoners that the Rump Parliament considered executing. He said that if he was to go to the scaffold he would be "hanged with the Bible under one arm and Magna Carta under the other".

Jenkins was eventually released in 1657 prior to the restoration of the monarchy. His estate at Hensol had been sequestered in 1652, but he regained it (estimated to be worth £1500 p.a.) and lived there, becoming patron of the bards. He died in 1663 and was buried at Cowbridge. The obituary for Jenkins is apparently the first of its kind in the English-speaking world, published in The Newes on 17 December 1663 by Charles II's Surveyor of the Press, Roger L'Estrange. Part of it read:

"... that Eminent, Loyall, and renowned Patriot, Judge Jenkins, Departed this Life at his House in Cowbridge, [at] 81..in perfect Sence and Memory. He dyed, as he lived, preaching with his last Breath to his Relations, and those who were about him, Loyalty to his Majesty, and Obedience to the Lawes of the Land. In fine, he has carried with him all the comforts of a Quiet Conscience, and left behind him an unspotted Fame..."

Mary Jenkins, daughter of Judge David Jenkins, was wife of Sir Robert Thomas, 2nd Baronet, married c. 1654. Robert Thomas and his father, Sir Edward Thomas, were also Royalists during the Civil War.

== Works ==
=== Centuries ===
Whilst in prison, Jenkins wrote Rerurm Judicatarum Centuriæ Octo, a set of reports on 800 cases at the court of the Exchequer and writs of Error at the Kings Bench, over the period 1220 (Note: 4 Henry III to 21 Jac. I) to 1623. The centuriæ octo in the title refers not to the period but to the number of cases reported, which are grouped into 8 sets of 100 cases (i.e. 8 "centuries") in the work. It is known informally as Jenkins' Centuries and was first published in 1661, in French and Latin.

An English translation was published in 1734 (Note: Some older bibliographies, such as by Marvin, say that this too was in French, but Charles Carroll Soule checked the Harvard Law Library and found that its copy of the 1734 edition was in English.) and the English title is Eight Centuries of Reports, or Eight Hundred Cases. Thomas Barlow published a third, also English, edition in 1777, that included additional references. Charles Francis Morrell published the fourth edition in 1885, a verbatim reprint of the Barlow edition, including the original page numbering so that citations (which conventionally employ page numbers) to the original still worked whilst reducing the paper size of the book from folio (less common by the 19th century), that included additional notes of his own.

It employed a format that was unique in the 17th century, and only became commonplace with the likes of John William Smith's Leading Cases in the 19th century, of giving a short statement of the case and how it was decided, a marginal citation to the authority, and a note by Jenkins, for some cases, providing commentary and illustration of the principle(s) involved. It is not strictly speaking a report as the English title suggests, but more an abridgement of other reporters, including Keilwey, Below, Dyer, Plowden, and Coke, and cases from abridgements by Fitzherbert, Statham, and Brooke. However, it omitted any obsolete cases that, by contrast, yearly abridgements included; and also included abstracts of some manuscript cases that are not found in other reports. It includes very few Exchequer cases, most being at the King's Bench.

In his "Life of Judge Jenkins" prefaced to the 1885 edition Morrel observed that the Centuries are how Jenkins was primarily known to the legal profession by that time. Morrel characterized it as having "very considerable authority".

Jenkins's own preface to the work describes how he wrote it: "Amidst the sound of drums and trumpets, surrounded by an odious multitude of barbarians, broken with old age and confinement in prisons, where my fellow subjects, grown wild with rage, detained me for fifteen years together, I bestowed many watchful hours upon this performance."

=== Other ===
Other of Jenkins's works include the aforementioned Lex Terræ, and Pacis Consultum: Or, a Directory to the Public Peace which was a 1657 history of various County Corporation Courts including the Court Leet, the latter of which's provenance is (see later) in dispute.

When brought before the Parliamentary committee of Examinations on 1647-04-10 instead of answering he presented to the presiding officer Miles Corbet a pamphlet explaining that he was not a traitor and that the Parliament had no legal authority. This was immediately published by Parliament (Note: It is also to be found as Answer in the Clarendon State Papers, ii, 365.) under the misleading title A Recantation of Judge Jenkins. Jenkins in his turn immediately published on 1647-05-06, datelined from The Tower on 1647-04-29, his The Vindication of Judge Jenkins denying that he had submitted to Parliament.

His response to the Speaker in February 1647/1648 was published as Judge Jenkin's Plea, and after Henry Marten had argued for sparing his life Jenkins published two further pamphlets: The Answer of Judge Jenkins to the Imputation put upon his Plea in Chancery and Remonstrance to the Lords and Commons of the Two Houses of Parliament at Westminster, the 21 of February, 1647.

His pamphlets collected in 1648 include Lex Terræ, or a Breife Discourse Collected out of the Fundamentall Lawes of the Land, Some Seeming Objections to Master Prinn's ... answered (1647-04-28), A Declaration of Mr. David Jenkins (1647-05-17), The Cordiall of Judge Jenkins for the Good People of London, in reply to a Thing called An Answer to the poysonous seditions Paper of Mr. D.J. by H. P. of Lincolns Inne (Note: The H.P. was Henry Parker, who wrote The Cordiall of Mr. D. Jenkins ... answered which was in turn a response to Jenkins's earlier Vindication.) (1647), The Inconveniences of a Long-continued Parliament, An Apology for the Army, and A Scourge for the Directory and Revolting Synod, which hath sitten these five hears, more for 4s. a day than for Conscience Sake. The collection has an engraving of Jenkins by William Marshall and a poem to Jenkins written by John Birkenhead. A second edition of the collection was published in 1681.

Other pamphlets were A Prepartive to the treaty: or a Short Expedient for Agreement and Peace tendered to the two Houses of Parliament (1648), God and the King; or the Divine Constitution of the Supreme Magistrate, especially in the Kingdom of England (1649), and A Proposition for the Safety and Happiness of the King and Kingdom, by a Lover of Sincerity and Peace (1667).

=== Disclaimed ===
Anthony Wood's Athenae Oxoniensis records several works that have been attributed to Jenkins but that were "disowned and disclaimed by him". These include the aforementioned Pacis Consultum, the Exact Method for Keeping a Courth of Survey for setting for and bounding of Manors, and Some Difficult Questions in Law, proposed unto and resolved by Judge Jenkings (1657).

== Sources ==
- Starck, Nigel (2004). Writes of Passage (PhD thesis). Australia: Flinders University.
- Thomas, D. Llkufer (1892). "Jenkins, David". In Lee, Sidney (ed.). Dictionary of National Biography. Vol. 29. New York: Macmillan. pp. 298–300.
- Soule, Charles Carroll (1883). "English Reports: Exchequer". The Lawyer's Reference Manual of Law Books and Citations. Boston: Soule and Bugbee.
- Jenkins, David (1885). Morrell, Charles Francis (ed.). Eight Centuries of Reports: Or, Eight Hundred Cases Solemnly Adjudged in the Exchequer Chamber, Or, Upon Writs of Error. [1220–1623]. Translated by Theodore Barlow (4th ed.). London: H. Sweet & Sons.
- Brooks, Christopher W. (4 January 2007). "Jenkins, David (1582-1663), royalist judge". Oxford Dictionary of National Biography. Oxford Dictionary of National Biography (online ed.). Oxford University Press. doi:10.1093/ref:odnb/14726. (Subscription, Wikipedia Library access or UK public library membership required.)
- Reed, Christopher (9 June 2004). "A matter of life and death". The Guardian.
