= Tredodridge =

Village in Wales

Coordinates: 51.486944°N 3.366111°W

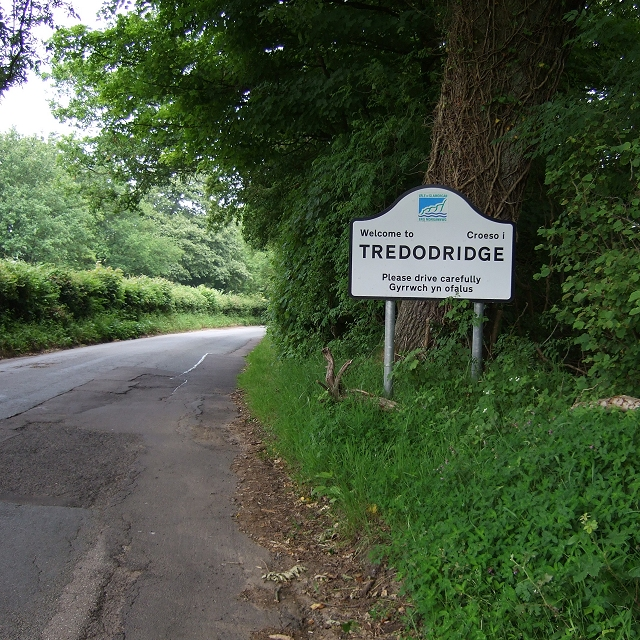

- Location within the Vale of Glamorgan
- OS grid reference: ST052773
- Principal area: Vale of Glamorgan
- Preserved county: South Glamorgan
- Country: Wales
- Sovereign state: United Kingdom
- Postcode district: CF
- Police: South Wales
- Fire: South Wales
- Ambulance: Welsh
- UK Parliament: Vale of Glamorgan
- Senedd Cymru – Welsh Parliament: Vale of Glamorgan

Tredodridge (also Tre-Dodridge) is a hamlet in the Vale of Glamorgan within Wales. It lies along a country lane to the northwest of Pendoylan and southwest of Clawddcoch. It contains Brynteg House, rumoured to have once been occupied by James Somerset The house, however. was built over 100 years after he came to the country. To the northwest of the hamlet is the Vale of Glamorgan Golf Club and Hensol Castle.

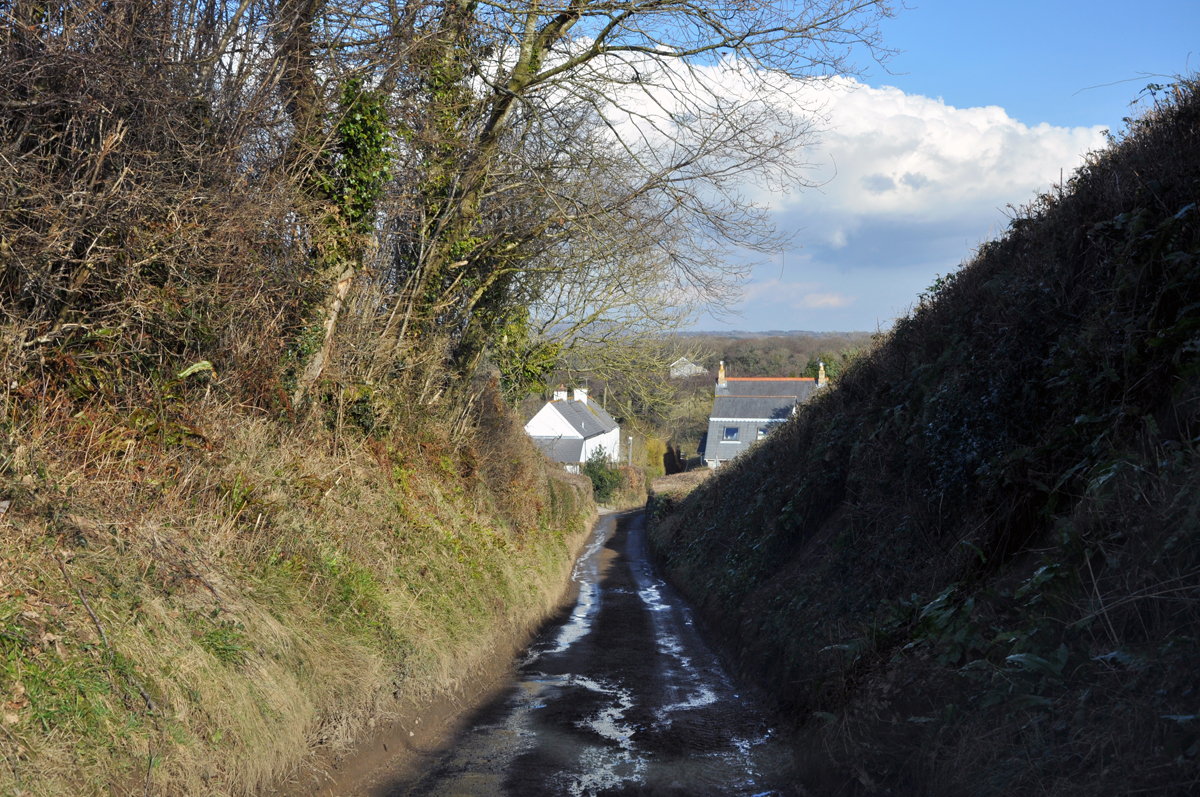
Lane approaching Tredodridge
