= Sir Godfrey Thomas, 9th Baronet =

Brigadier-General Sir Godfrey Thomas Bt CB CBE DSO DL
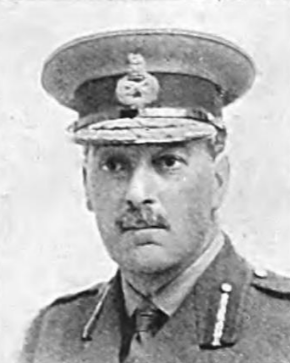
- Born: 27 March 1856; Hafod, Cardigan
- Died: 17 February 1919 (aged 62)
- Military career
- Allegiance: United Kingdom
- Branch: British Army
- Service years: 1875–1919
- Rank: Brigadier-General
- Unit: Royal Artillery
- Commands: No. 2 Reserve Brigade RFA
- Conflicts: Second Anglo-Afghan War; Anglo-Egyptian War; Second Anglo-Boer War; First World War
- Awards: Companion of the Order of the Bath; Commander of the Order of the British Empire; Companion of the Distinguished Service Order; Mentioned in Dispatches

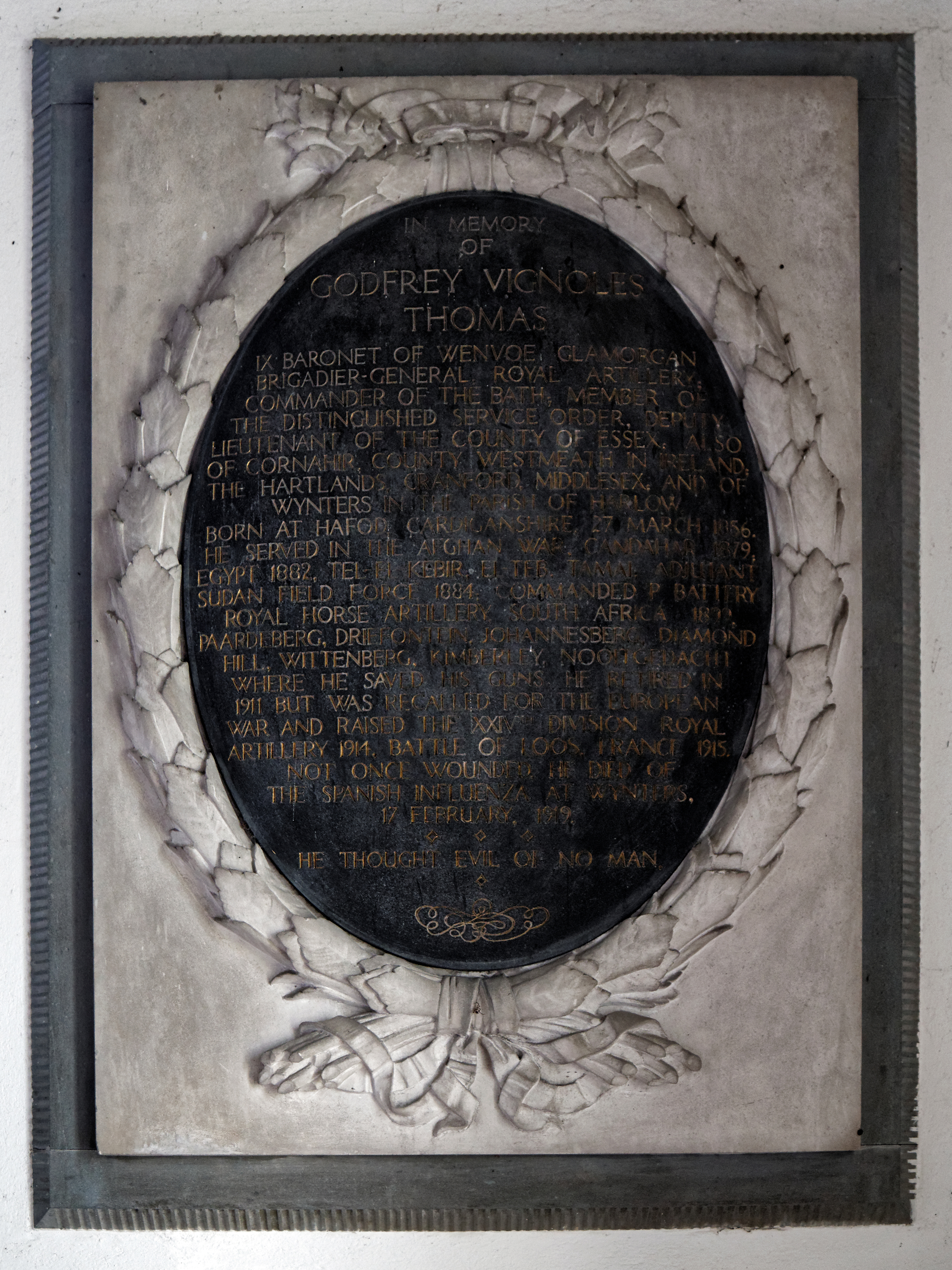
Godfrey Thomas memorial in St Mary Magdalen's Church, Magdalen Laver, Essex

Brigadier-General Sir Godfrey Vignoles Thomas, 9th Baronet, CB, CBE, DSO, DL (27 March 1856 – 17 February 1919) was a British Army officer of the First World War.

== Early life ==
Thomas was the son of Sir Godfrey John Thomas, 8th Baronet and Emily Chambers. On 13 July 1861, he succeeded to his father's baronetcy.

== Military career ==
He was educated at the Royal Military Academy, Woolwich and commissioned into the Royal Artillery in 1875. He served in the Second Anglo-Afghan War from 1878 to 1880, and in the Anglo-Egyptian War of 1884. He was promoted to major in 1892. Thomas was promoted to colonel in 1899 and fought in the Second Anglo-Boer War between 1899 and 1901, during which he was twice mentioned in dispatches. In 1901 he was made a Companion of the Distinguished Service Order, and a Companion of the Order of the Bath in 1904. In March 1909 he was promoted to temporary brigadier general, and was commander, Royal Artillery (CRA) of the 3rd Division until January 1911 when he retired from the army.

He was called back to service during the First World War, fighting in France, serving as CRA of the 24th Division. He was invested as a Commander of the Order of the British Empire in 1916. From 1916 to 1917 Thomas was brigadier-general of the No. 2 Reserve Brigade RFA (Territorial Forces).

== Personal life ==
He married Mary Frances Isabelle Oppenheim, daughter of Charles Augustus Oppenheim and Isabelle Frith, on 30 April 1887. Following his early death in 1919, he was succeeded in his title by his son, Godfrey, who served as a courtier to the Royal Family.

He was appointed a Deputy Lieutenant of Essex on 1 May 1912. In the 1919 Birthday Honours, he was posthumously awarded the Commander of the Order of the British Empire, "for valuable services rendered in connection with the War."

He died of influenza on 17 February 1919, and was buried at St Mary & St Hugh, Old Harlow.

Baronetage of England
Preceded by Godfrey John Thomas	Baronet (of Wenvoe); 1861–1919	Succeeded by Godfrey John Vignoles Thomas
