= Sir Godfrey Thomas, 10th Baronet =

Assistant Private Secretary to Edward VIII

Sir Godfrey John Vignoles Thomas, 10th Baronet, GCVO, KCB, CSI (14 April 1889 – 4 March 1968) was a British courtier who served as Assistant Private Secretary to Edward VIII in 1936.

== Biography ==
Thomas was the son of Brigadier-General Sir Godfrey Vignoles Thomas, 9th Baronet and Mary Frances Isabelle Oppenheim. He was educated at Harrow School, before serving in His Majesty's Diplomatic Service between 1912 and 1919.

In 1919 he became Private Secretary to the Prince of Wales, and succeeded to his father's baronetcy the same year. In 1922 he was invested as a Companion of the Order of the Star of India. Following the accession of the Prince of Wales to the throne, Thomas became Assistant Private Secretary to King Edward VIII. In 1937 he was knighted as a Knight Commander of the Order of the Bath, and became Private Secretary to Prince Henry, Duke of Gloucester. During the Second World War, Thomas worked for the Foreign Office between 1939 and 1944, before resuming his position in the Duke of Gloucester's household until 1957. In 1947 he was made a Knight Grand Cross of the Royal Victorian Order, and he was made a member of the Privy Council of the United Kingdom in the 1958 Birthday Honours List.

He married Diana Mary Katherine Hoskyns, daughter of Venerable Benedict George Hoskyns and Dora Katherine Franklyn, on 11 September 1924. He was succeeded in his title by his son, Godfrey.

Baronetage of England
Preceded by Godfrey Vignoles Thomas	Baronet (of Wenvoe); 1919–1968	Succeeded by Godfrey Michael David Thomas
