= Pendoylan =

Pendoylan: Welsh: Pendeulwyn
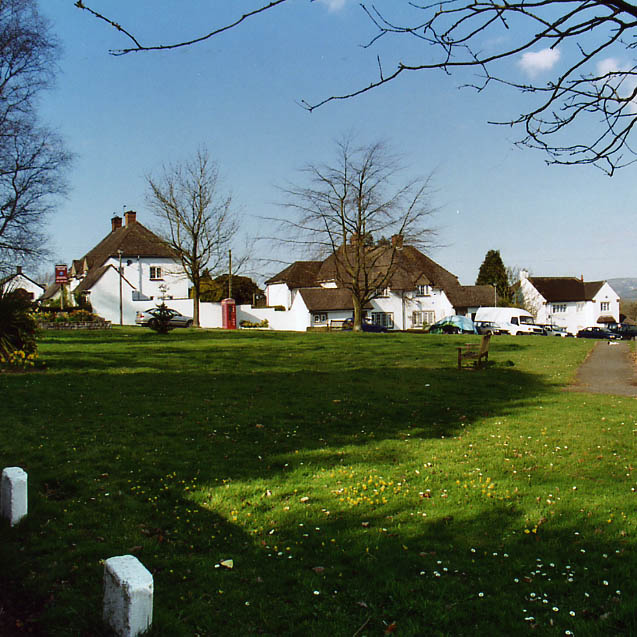

- Location within the Vale of Glamorgan
- Area: 5.8 sq mi (15 km^{2})
- Population: 464 (2011)
  - Density: 80/sq mi (31/km^{2})
- OS grid reference: ST060767
  - Cardiff: 7 miles (11 km) East
- Civil parish: Pendoylan
- Community: Pendoylan
- Principal area: Vale of Glamorgan
- Preserved county: South Glamorgan
- Country: Wales
- Sovereign state: United Kingdom
- Post town: COWBRIDGE
- Postcode district: CF71
- Post town: PONTYCLUN
- Postcode district: CF72
- Dialling code: 01446
- Police: South Wales
- Fire: South Wales
- Ambulance: Welsh
- UK Parliament: Vale of Glamorgan
- Senedd Cymru – Welsh Parliament: Vale of Glamorgan
- List of places UK Wales Vale of Glamorgan 51.481°N 3.355°W Map of the community

Pendoylan (Welsh: Pendeulwyn, pronounced [pɛnˈdəi̯lui̯n], 'head of two groves') is a rural village and community (parish) in the Vale of Glamorgan, Wales. The village has won many awards in Best Kept Village competitions and contains 27 entries in the council's County Treasures database, 13 of which are listed buildings.

== Location ==
The area of the community of Pendoylan, some 15 km^{2} (5.8 sq mi), is situated between the A48 road and the M4 motorway in the Border Vale. It slopes down from an escarpment in the west, the site of Hensol Forest, and is bounded in the East by the River Ely. Tredodridge lies to the northwest.

== History ==
The area is rich in history. There is evidence of prehistoric activity in two cooking mounds in the east and there is a motte with possible signs of a bailey in the north. The parish church, which is dedicated to St Cadoc (born circa 497), may well have been founded in his lifetime and there is a well named after him and one after St Teilo. The fertile land at Caerwigau was acquired by the Norman de Bonvils and in the twelfth century, 40 acres (160,000 m^{2}) were granted to the Knights Hospitallers who rented it out to the monks of Margham. They later acquired further land and erected a chapel in the 12th century. There is a well-preserved moat from a 13th- or 14th-century homestead at Caerwigau. In the 14th century a family known as “Llewelyn of Caerwigga” were established. The old manor house was founded in Tudor times and stands today as Caerwigau Isaf, a Grade II listed building. The first record of a priest of Pendoylan is early in the 13th century. He is one “Urban” “Sacredos de Pondewelin” but there is a fairly complete list of incumbents from Elizabethan times.

The estate at Hensol dates at least from the early 15th century and Hensol House (now Grade I listed Hensol Castle) was built in the 16th century. It has been home to a succession of eminent people including Judge David Jenkins (1582–1663) the staunch royalist who nearly lost his head in the civil war, Charles Talbot (1685–1737) who served in Walpole's government becoming Lord Chancellor in 1733 and taking the title Baron Talbot of Hensol, Benjamin Hall (1778–1817), whose son became Baron Lanover and may have given his name to the Palace of Westminster's “Big Ben”, the “Iron King” of Merthyr Tydfil William Crawshay II (1788–1867) who later built Cyfarthfa Castle, another ironmaster, Rowland Fothergill (1794–1871) of Abernant who in 1853 commissioned David Brandon to rebuild Pendoylan Parish Church and his sister Mary (1797–1887) who built and endowed a new school building for Pendoylan in his memory in 1873.

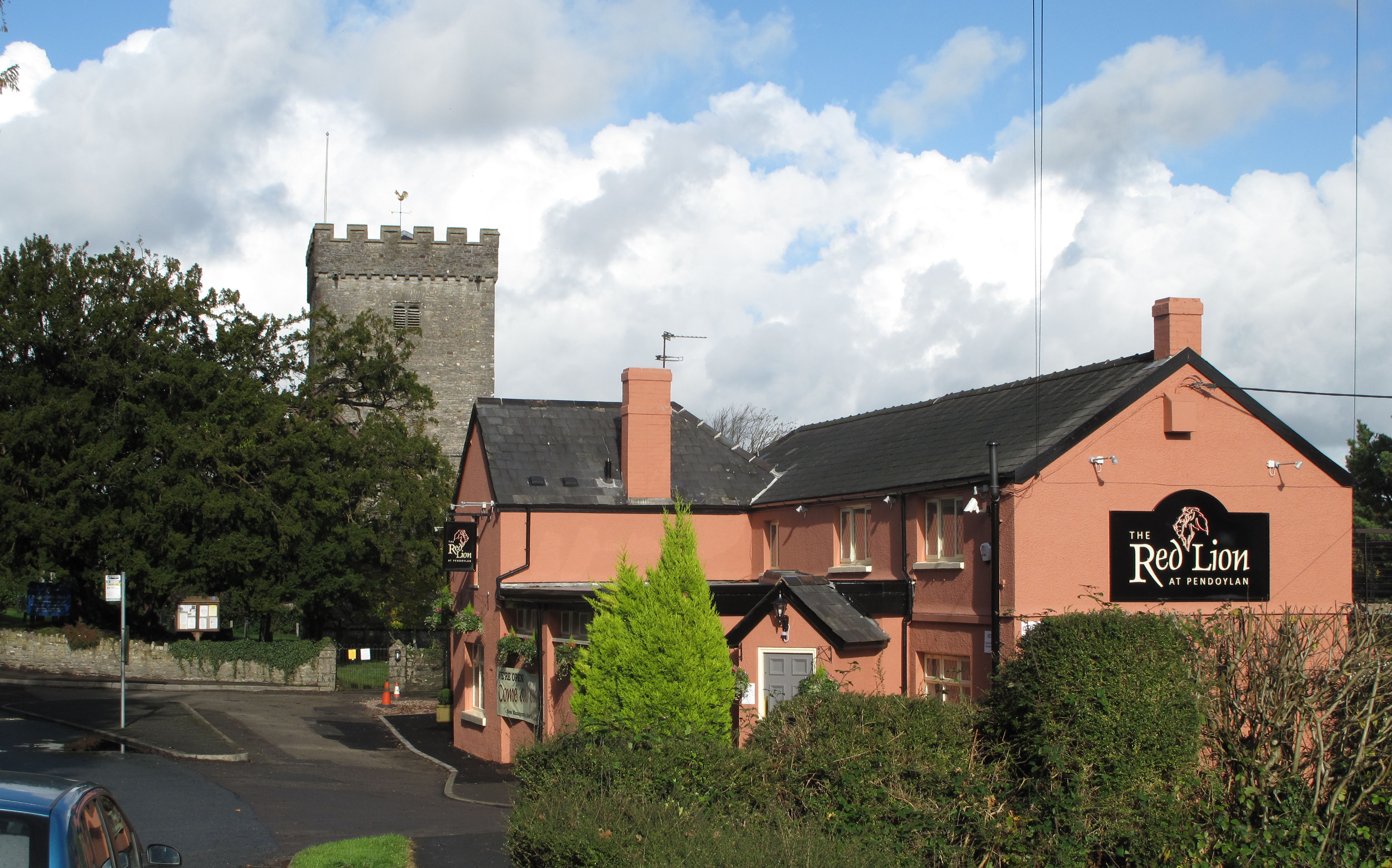
Pendoylan Church and Pub (November 2011)

Following Pendoylan having won the Environment Category in the 2004 Calor Village of the Year for Wales competition, Prince Charles and Camilla, Duchess of Cornwall, visited the village and met residents on 14 July 2005 . He presented a plaque and said in his speech "It is a real joy to see such a wonderful functioning village with such a sense of community".

== Amenities ==
The parish church is dedicated to Saint Cadoc. It contains some interesting features which can definitely be assigned to pre-reformation times, the chancel arch being in the early perpendicular style of the 14th century. Other features are of 14th-, 15th- and 16th-century perpendicular with 19th-century alterations. The church has a peal of six bells which continue to be rung from time to time. There is a row of six cottages just to the north of the church that were built in 1817 as almshouses from a bequest of £50 from Earl Talbot of Hensol and £50 from one Philip John. They were of very basic one up one down plus kitchen construction with a fireplace stair. No. 1 was subsequently rebuilt as a school.

The village school is a Church in Wales Primary School It was under threat of closure in the 1980s, the roll having fallen from 103 in 1981 to 74 in 1986. Since the arrival of a new head teacher in 1994, it has become much more popular, with up to 220 pupils, many of whom travel from outside the parish. Old temporary buildings are being replaced with permanent structures in 2011/12. Inspectors in 2008 said the following.

"This is a good school with many outstanding features. Pupils make very good progress and achieve high standards because of the very good teaching they receive. The provision is of high quality and the school leadership successfully promotes a caring Christian ethos, which is appreciated by parents and pupils alike. Throughout the school, pupils make outstanding progress in their learning and achieve high standards. Pupils succeed regardless of their social, ethnic or linguistic backgrounds and make very good progress towards fulfilling their potential. They are very well prepared for the next phase of their education."

The former village pub was called 'The Red Lion'. Records of this inn date back to the early 19th century, when the publican was also a farmer, but it was probably older than that. It closed in July 2010 and re-opened in October 2011, following a complete refurbishment, but like many village pubs proved uneconomic and has been closed for a number of years.

There is also a Chapel which houses the Bethania Presbyterian Church (originally Calvinistic Methodism) and a Village Hall built in the 1930s as a memorial to those who died in the first world war.

The Vale Resort is located at Hensol in the north of Pendoylan, close to Junction 34 of the M4. It consists of a four star hotel, two championship golf courses and a leisure centre, with a swimming pool and gym.
