= Hensol Castle =

- Castell Hensol
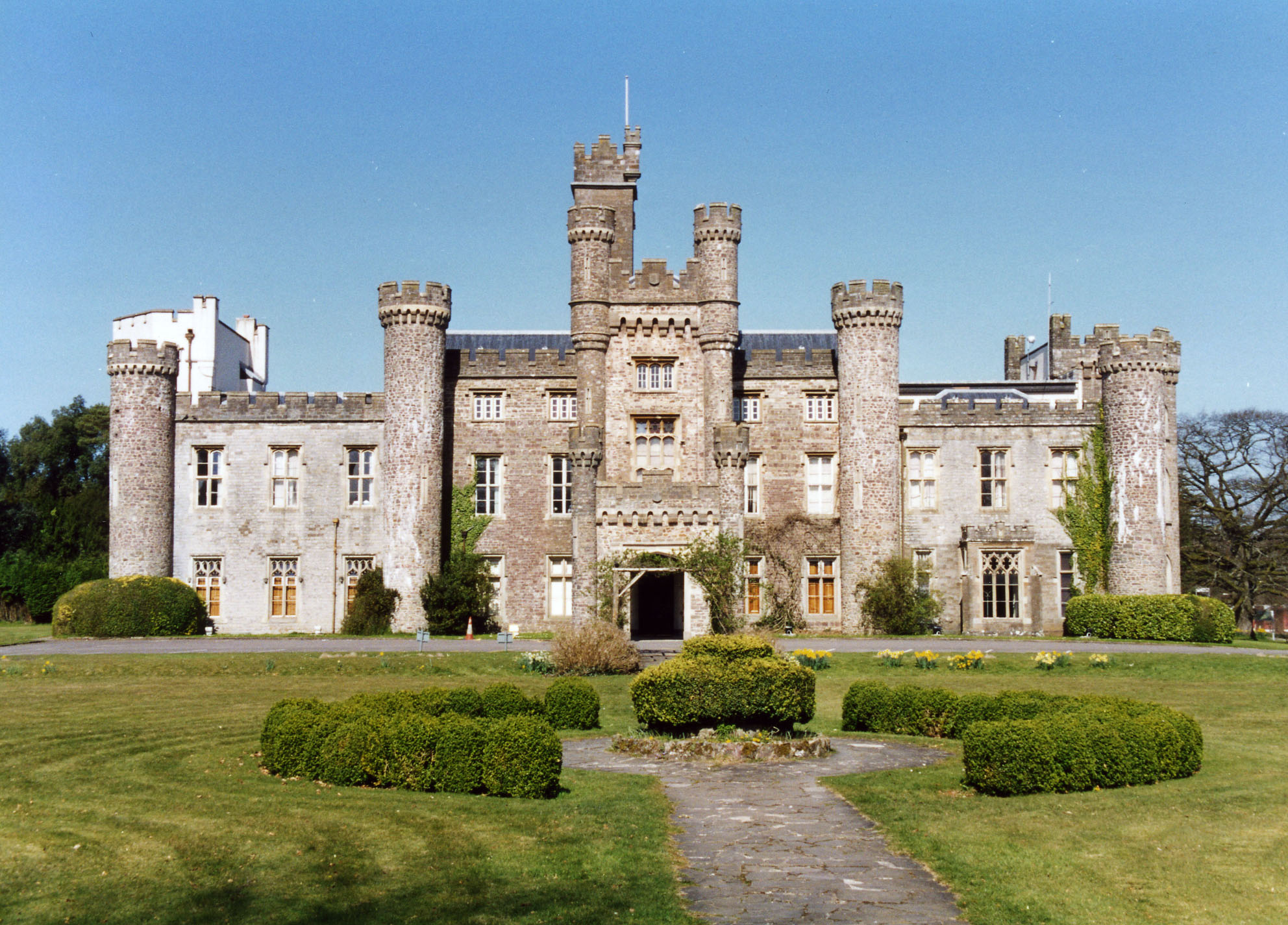
- South elevation of Hensol Castle, March 2003

- Location within Vale of Glamorgan
- Former names: Hensol House

General information
- Status: Private venue
- Type: Castellated mansion
- Architectural style: Gothic
- Location: Pendoylan, Vale of Glamorgan, Hensol Castle Park, Hensol, Vale of Glamorgan, CF72 8JX, Wales
- Coordinates: 51.5012°N 3.3737°W
- Owner: Leekes
- Affiliation: The Vale Resort

Design and construction
- Designations: Grade I Listed

Website
- hensolcastle.com

Listed Building – Grade I

Hensol Castle (previously Hensol House) is a castellated mansion in the Gothic Revival style dating from the late 17th century or early 18th century, now a wedding and conference venue for The Vale Resort. It is located north of Clawdd Coch and Tredodridge in the community of Pendoylan in the Vale of Glamorgan, Wales. It is a Grade I listed building and its park is designated Grade II on the Cadw/ICOMOS Register of Parks and Gardens of Special Historic Interest in Wales.

== Architecture ==
This substantially extended mansion is something of an archaeological puzzle. The south range came first and is thought to be an unusually early example of the gothic revival in Britain. This may have been the work of the London architect Roger Morris. Around 1735, William Talbot, Member of Parliament and later Baron Talbot of Hensol, added the east and west wings, reportedly spending some £60,000. Samuel Richardson is said to have transformed the south front in the late 18th or early 19th century, by adding more castellations and corner turrets, but there is some doubt about this. In the 1840s Rowland Fothergill employed T.H. Wyatt & David Brandon to improve the property. They extended the house to the north, added a new courtyard, and refashioned some of the gothic into Perpendicular, changed the battlements and added the off-centre window bay to the south front. The interior is classical in style of various dates.

== Occupants ==
=== Early history ===
The Hensol estate dates from at least 1419. It was owned by the Jenkins family in the seventeenth century, and the house was said to have been built by David Jenkins' great-grandfather, David Tew.

The famous judge David Jenkins (1582–1663), the son of "Jenkin Richard of Hensol in the parish of Pendeulwyn" was born at Hensol. He was described in old documents as "Counsellor at Law, and one of the judges of the Western Circuit in the reign of King Charles I". Judge Jenkins was a man of great force of character and some eccentricity, named "Heart of Oak" and "Pillar of the Law". Being a staunch royalist, he took an active part against the Parliamentarians, during the English Civil War, condemning several to death for activities deemed treasonable. He was captured at either Hereford or Oxford in 1645 and sent to the Tower of London. On 21 February 1648 he was brought before the House of Commons but refused to kneel at the bar. He was therefore fined £1,000 (equivalent to about £100,000 at 2009 values) for his contempt. He was impeached for high treason, and when an act was passed for his trial, he met it with a declaration that he would “die with the Bible under one arm and Magna Carta under the other”. After the restoration of the monarchy under King Charles II, he was liberated in 1656 and returned to his estate in Glamorgan where he subsequently died and was buried at Cowbridge. His wife, Cecil, was daughter of Sir Thomas Aubrey, of Llantrithyd.

The 1670 Hearth Tax return shows that the Hensol mansion of that time possessed 18 hearths. Judge Jenkins’ son, David Jenkins was described as being “of Hensol” when he was High Sheriff of Glamorgan in 1685. This David Jenkins married Mary, daughter of Edward Pritchard of Llancaiach Fawr. They had a son, Richard, and a daughter, Cecil, who married Charles Mathew of Castell Mynach. They in turn had a daughter, Cecil.

An annual assembly of the bards was for many years held under the auspices of the Jenkins family in the adjoining parish of Ystrad Owen, until the death of Richard Jenkins who was a warm admirer of Welsh poetry and music, and a good performer on the harp.

=== Eighteenth century ===
The Jenkins male line became extinct with Richard Jenkins’ death in 1721 and the estate passed to Charles Talbot (1685–1737) though his marriage in 1708 or 1709 with the Jenkins heiress, Cecil (d 1720), daughter of Richard Jenkins’ sister, Cecil, and Charles Mathew of Castell Mynach. The Talbot family had come into Glamorgan through the marriage of John Ivory Talbot of Lacock Abbey, Wiltshire, with Mary, daughter of Thomas Mansel, 1st Baron Mansel of Margam Abbey, Glamorgan. John Ivory Talbot's daughter inherited Lacock Abbey. Her son, William Davenport Talbot, was the father of William Henry Fox Talbot of photographic fame.

Charles Talbot, 1st Baron Talbot served in Robert Walpole's government becoming Lord Chancellor in 1733 and taking the title Baron Talbot of Hensol. His son, William Talbot (1710–1782) was elected Member of Parliament for Glamorgan in 1734. His opponent, Bussy Mansel of Margam (later Lord Mansel) contested the result despite having initially received 823 votes against Talbot's 678; but 247 were struck off from Mansel, and only 21 from Talbot. The sheriff, William Basset of Miskin, was accused of great partiality. Charles Talbot died in February 1736/37, William becoming the 2nd Baron Talbot. Bussy Mansel was then elected MP. William Talbot became Earl Talbot in 1761. In 1765 he leased some land near Merthyr Tydfil to Anthony Bacon and William Brownrigg at £100 p.a. for 99 years without royalty payments. This contained both coal and iron ore and was used to develop the Cyfarthfa Ironworks, that became the largest in the world and was later run by another resident of Hensol Castle, William Crawshay II. A large tablet inside the north wall of Pendoylan Parish Church commemorates a gift of £50 from Earl Talbot, the interest of which was to be given to the poor of Pendoylan. In 1770 it was matched by a further £50 given by Philip John, and in 1871, a row of six charity houses were built which stand as Church Row to this day.

The present house was either newly built, or was an extensive remodelling of the manor of the Jenkins family, in around 1735. In 1780, William Talbot, 2nd Baron Talbot of Hensol, later 1st Earl Talbot, was created the 1st Baron Dynevor with a special remainder in favour of his only child, a daughter, Cecil Rice, and "the heirs male of her body". She had married George Rice of Newtown House, Dinefwr Park, Llandeilo. In 1782 William Talbot died, the Earldom became extinct, and the barony of Talbot of Hensol passed to his nephew, John Chetwynd Talbot (1749–1793), for whom the title Earl Talbot was revived. The title Baron Talbot of Hensol is still held by the Earl of Shrewsbury, the premier earl in England and Ireland.

In 1789 the estate was sold by the Talbot family to Samuel Richardson (1739–1824), a banker, who may have modified the south front of the house, and who was High Sheriff of Gloucestershire in 1787 and of Glamorgan in 1798. He is said to have been a pioneer in agriculture and made many improvements to the Hensol estate, including land drainage and introducing the threshing machine.

Samuel Richardson left in 1815, and Hensol was purchased by Benjamin Hall (1778–1817), son of Dr Benjamin Hall (1742–1825) Chancellor of the diocese of Llandaff. Benjamin Hall had married Charlotte Crawshay (1784–1839), second daughter of Richard Crawshay (1739–1810), ironmaster of Cyfarthfa, in 1801 and had been elected MP in 1806. Their first son was another Benjamin Hall (1802–1867) and he also became an MP, was made baronet in 1838 and in 1859 became Baron Lanover. In 1855, as Sir Benjamin Hall, Chief Commissioner of the Metropolitan Board of Works, he oversaw the later stages of the rebuilding of the Houses of Parliament, including the installation of the 13.8-tonne hour bell, "Big Ben", in the clock tower. He was a tall man and many attribute its name to him, but this is questionable.

=== Nineteenth century ===
Following the early death of the second Benjamin Hall in 1817, Hensol was put on the market in 1824 and passed to his widow's Crawshay family, Hensol being bought by her nephew, the "Iron King" of Merthyr Tydfil. William Crawshay II (1788–1867), who later built Cyfarthfa Castle. William Crawshay was High Sheriff of Glamorgan in 1829.

Another ironmaster, Rowland Fothergill (1794–1871) of Abernant bought Hensol in 1838, and soon employed T.H. Wyatt and David Brandon to remodel it. Despite being a county magistrate, he was convicted in 1844 of inflicting a serious injury with a pitchfork on a Mr. Brown, the superintendent of his farms. The plaintiff was awarded £500 damages. Fothergill was High Sheriff of Glamorgan in 1850. In 1853 he commissioned David Brandon to rebuild Pendoylan Parish Church.

On Fothergill's death the estate passed to his unmarried sister, Mary (1797–1887). She built and endowed a new school building for Pendoylan in his memory in 1873. On her death, Hensol passed to her sister Ann Tarleton-Fothergill (1802–1895), the estate passing to her daughter, Lady Isabella Elizabeth Price Fothergill (1839–1918), who had married Sir Rose Lambart Price 3rd Baronet (1837–1899) in 1877. Major Sir Rose Lambart Price travelled in America and published two books on his observations.

=== Twentieth century ===
Their first son, Lieutenant Sir Rose Price (1878–1901) was killed in action at Villesdorp in the Anglo-Boer War. Their third son Lt. William Rose Price (1882–1907) also died in South Africa, whilst serving in the 9th Queen's Royal Lancers. Lady Price Fothergill died of pneumonia following influenza on 30 November 1918. Their second son, Sir Francis Caradoc Rose Price (1880–1949) then inherited Hensol, but in 1923 he put it up for sale and was quoted in The Times newspaper as follows.

The old place requires a lot of money to maintain it. Income-tax and supertax have almost trebled since the war, and the cost of upkeep has considerably increased. These heavy burdens make careful consideration of one's position necessary, and there is a duty to younger children. If I died to-morrow, heavy death duties would make it impossible for them to live here. I can go on, but they could not. By the time one has paid all Imperial and local dues in the way of taxation there is not much left now, and for that reason I have decided to put the estate up for sale.

In November 1926 he sold the castle and estate of 1,082 acres (4.38 km^{2}) to Glamorgan County Council for the sum of £36,500 for use as a County mental hospital. Part of the estate was divided up into smallholdings.

Hensol hospital was opened in July 1930 as a "colony" for 100 men with learning disabilities ("mental defectives" in the terminology of the time). New blocks were built in the grounds in 1935 to accommodate up to 460 men, women and children and in 1937 it was visited by Sir Kingsley Wood, Minister of Health. At that time it housed 343 inmates and the Minister was reported as saying that he hoped to take back to his work in London fresh ideas which one could never obtain from minutes and records. Further building and expansion took place with the advent of the National Health Service in 1948. Latterly in the 20th century, with the move towards community care for people with learning disabilities, the number of patients progressively decreased. In the 1980s the ground floor of the house became a conference centre and, from 1992 to 2002, the upper two stories housed the Wales School of Occupational Therapy.

The hospital closed in 2003 and the castle and grounds were bought by local businessman Gerald Leeke, chairman of the Leekes group of companies who had previously built the 145-bed Vale of Glamorgan Hotel, Golf and Spa Resort on adjacent land. Some of the former hospital buildings have been converted into apartments.

The interior of Hensol Castle was used to stand-in for parts of Whitehall in the 1992 film Rebecca's Daughters and was used for scenes set in 10 Downing Street for the Doctor Who episodes "Aliens of London", "World War Three" and "The Sound of Drums".
