= Thomas baronets of Garreglwyd (1918) =

The Thomas baronetcy, of Garreglwyd in the County of Anglesey, was created in the Baronetage of the United Kingdom on 5 July 1918 for Robert Thomas. He was a ship and insurance broker and also represented Wrexham from 1918 to 1922, and Anglesey from 1923 to 1929, in the House of Commons.

== Thomas baronets, of Garreglwyd (1918) ==
- Sir Robert John Thomas, 1st Baronet (1873–1951)
- Sir William Eustace Rhyddlad Thomas, 2nd Baronet (1909–1957)
- Sir (William) Michael Marsh Thomas, 3rd Baronet (1930–2009)

Coat of arms of Thomas baronets of Garreglwyd
Crest On the waves of the sea Proper between two anchors Sable a ship in full sail Proper. Escutcheon Per pale Gules and Azure on a chevron Argent between in dexter chief a sower scattering seed and in sinister chief an eagle displayed both Or and in base a garb of the last three fleurs-de-lis Sable. Motto Fac Recte Et Nil Time
