= Llanmihangel Place =

Manor house in Llanmihangel, Wales

Coordinates: 51.43734°N 3.46718°W

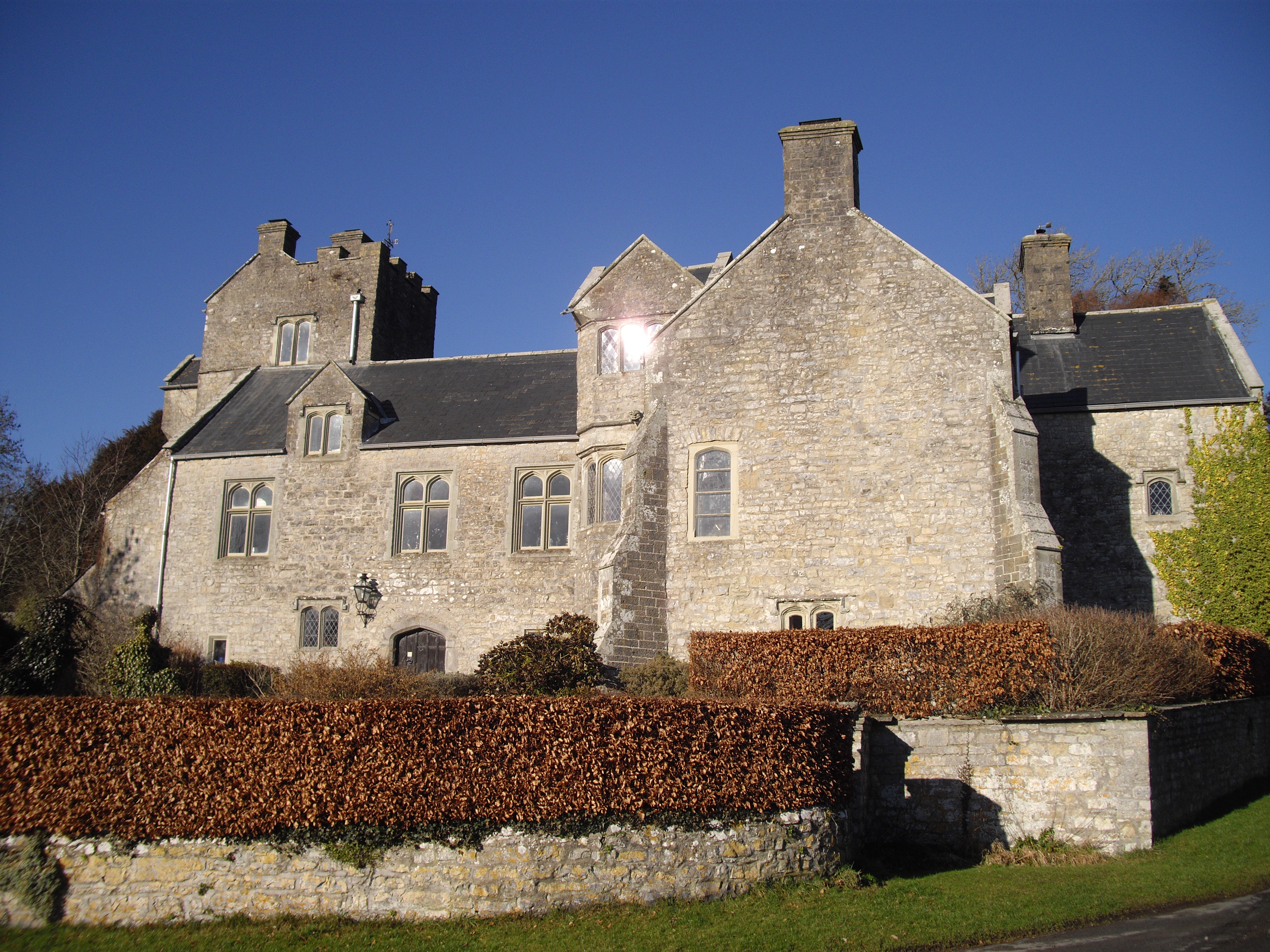
Llanmihangel Place

Llanmihangel Place (Welsh: Plas Llanmihangel) is a Grade I listed manor house in the Vale of Glamorgan, South Wales. It became a Grade I listed building on 16 December 1952. The house dates back to the 12th century, when it was constructed as a single-storey dwelling.

== Location ==
Llanmihangel Place is located in the Nant Llanmihangel Valley, built on a southward facing slope. It is situated between the towns of Cowbridge and Llantwit Major in the Vale of Glamorgan.

== History ==
Llanmihangel Place dates back to the 12th century; the first recorded building on the site was a one-storey structure which was owned by a Norman knight. During the 15th and 16th centuries, the site underwent a significant expansion which incorporated the original Norman structure into the basement. In the 16th and 17th centuries, the house was owned by the Thomas family, a prominent aristocrat family. The last of the family to own Llanmihangel was Sir Robert Thomas, 2nd Baronet who lost a vast amount of the family's fortune.

In 1685, Llanmihangel Place was sold to the Lord Mayor of London, Humphrey Edwin. The building remained in the Edwin family before becoming the home of John Franklin, a judge, and becoming the property of the Earl of Dunraven.

In 1988, it was bought for £139,000 by new owners who renovated the property. in the early 21st century, the house was being used as a bed and breakfast. It was listed for sale in 2018 for £1.3 million.

== Layout ==
The main house is a Grade I listed building, while the terrace, steps, barn and stable are all Grade II listed. The description of its listing states that the house is an "exceptionally rare survival, intact and largely unaltered". The building is built of lias limestone and features a pitched slate roof. In its current form, the house features 12 bedrooms, split over four floors, a study, servants quarters and a dining room, two kitchens and a drawing room. The grounds of the estate are around 10 acres and are designated Grade II* on the Cadw/ICOMOS Register of Parks and Gardens of Special Historic Interest in Wales.
