= The Devil's Daughter (painting) =

1917 painting by Margaret Lindsay Williams

"The Devil's Daughter" is a 1917 painting by Welsh society artist Margaret Lindsay Williams. It was painted in oils on stretched canvas, and is one of Williams' best known works.

The painting is a work in the "wages of sin" allegorical genre popular in the early 20th century, when the conduct of society women came in for much criticism. In addition to portraits of notable people such as Queen Alexandra and Gwilym Lloyd George, Margaret Lindsay Williams created several works in this style. It was exhibited at the Royal Academy in 1917, where it "created something of a sensation". According to Country Life, her paintings in this style generated considerable public interest; it refers to them as "problem pictures".

A sequel painting, "The Triumph", was exhibited at the Royal Academy in 1918, and another in the series, "The Imprisoned Soul", was painted in 1920.

== Subject of the painting ==
The subject of "The Devil's Daughter" is a woman holding a fan and holding a human skull. A death's head with bat's wings adorns her headdress, and she turns away from a crucifix being held up to her by an unseen person.
