= Herman Sekne =

Norwegian professional golfer (born 2001)

Personal information
- Full name: Herman Wibe Sekne
- Nationality: Norway
- Born: 21 May 2001 (age 25) Oslo, Norway

Career
- Sport: Golf
- College: Purdue University
- Turned professional: 2024
- Current tours: PGA Tour Americas; Challenge Tour

Achievements and awards
- Big Ten Golfer of the Year: 2024

Herman Wibe Sekne (born 21 May 2001) is a Norwegian professional golfer. As an amateur he was runner-up at the 2023 Eisenhower Trophy.

== Amateur career ==
Sekne was born in Oslo and represented Oslo Golf Club winning the Norwegian Junior Team Championship in 2017, 2018 and 2019. He finished 3rd at the 2019 English Boys Open Amateur Stroke Play Championship for the Carris Trophy and 6th at the 2020 Portuguese International Amateur, before winning the Norwegian Golf Federation's International Trophy in 2020.

Sekne played for his national team, and had success at the Eisenhower Trophy, the World Amateur Team Championships, alongside Mats Ege and Michael Mjaaseth. They finished 4th in 2022 at Le Golf National in Paris, and in Abu Dhabi in 2023 the team secured a historic silver medal for Norway, only beaten by the U.S. team with Nick Dunlap, David Ford, and Gordon Sargent. Sekne tied for 3rd individually, behind only Kazuma Kobori and Nick Dunlap.

Sekne enrolled at Purdue University in the fall of 2019 and played with the Purdue Boilermakers men's golf team until 2024. He recorded four individual victories and was named All-American twice, and Big Ten Golfer of the Year in 2024.

He reached a career high of 14th in the World Amateur Golf Ranking and earned status through PGA Tour University.

== Professional career ==
Sekne turned professional in 2024 and made his pro debut at the Corales Puntacana Championship on the PGA Tour before joining the Challenge Tour, where his best finish was a tie for 5th at the Euram Bank Open.

In 2025, he joined the PGA Tour Americas and became a member of the NextUp Golf Team, through which he is mentored by Viktor Hovland.

== Amateur wins ==
- 2018 Stenson Sunesson Junior Challenge, Srixon Tour #7
- 2020 International Trophy
- 2021 Rich Harvest Farms Intercollegiate, Purdue Fall Invitational
- 2022 Boilermaker Invitational, Windon Memorial Classic

== Team appearances ==
Amateur

- European Boys' Team Championship (representing Norway): 2019
- European Nations Cup – Copa Sotogrande (representing Norway): 2019
- Eisenhower Trophy (representing Norway): 2022, 2023
- Bonallack Trophy (representing Europe): 2023
- Arnold Palmer Cup (representing International team): 2023
