= Mats Ege =

Norwegian professional golfer

Personal information
- Nationality: Norway
- Born: 6 February 2000 (age 26) Kristiansand, Norway
- Height: 6 ft 0 in (183 cm)

Career
- Sport: Golf
- College: California State University, Northridge; East Tennessee State University
- Turned professional: 2024
- Current tour: PGA Tour Americas
- Professional wins: 2

Achievements and awards
- Garmin Norgescup Order of Merit winner: 2021
- Southern Conference Player of the Year: 2023
- Southern Conference Male Athlete of the Year: 2024

Mats Ege (born 6 February 2000) is a Norwegian professional golfer. As an amateur he won the 2023 Norwegian National Golf Championship was runner-up at the 2023 Eisenhower Trophy.

== Amateur career ==
Ege was born in Kristiansand and learned to play golf at Bjaavann GC, before switching to Stavanger GC. He won several international tournaments between 2018 and 2020, and in 2021 he topped the Garmin Norgescup Order of Merit.

Ege played for his national team, and had success at the Eisenhower Trophy, the World Amateur Team Championships, alongside Herman Wibe Sekne and Michael Mjaaseth. They finished 4th in 2022 at Le Golf National in Paris, and in Abu Dhabi in 2023 the team secured a historic silver medal for Norway, only beaten by the U.S. team with Nick Dunlap, David Ford, and Gordon Sargent.

Ege enrolled at California State University, Northridge in the fall of 2019 and started playing with the Cal State Northridge Matadors men's golf team, where he recorded the team's lowest stroke average. After his freshman year he transferred to East Tennessee State University and the East Tennessee State Buccaneers men's golf team, where he was Southern Conference Player of the Year his second year. Ege was one of the best college golf players in his final season, claiming three victories including the conference title, and was named Southern Conference Male Athlete of the Year.

Ege played in the 2023 Arnold Palmer Cup and graduated in May 2024 with a degree in Management. He finished the 2023-24 season ranked 11th in the PGA Tour University Rankings.

== Professional career ==
Ege turned professional in 2024 and joined the PGA Tour Americas. In 2025, he tied for 3rd at the Bupa Championship in Mexico and the Manitoba Open in Canada. He also made a number of European Tour starts, with a best finish of 11th at the Danish Golf Championship.

== Amateur wins ==
- 2017 Garmin Norgescup #3
- 2018 Garmin Norgescup #2, Danish Junior Games, Global Junior Golf Grand Final
- 2020 Golfweek Moorpark Amateur
- 2021 Garmin Norgescup #1, Garmin Norgescup Larvik, Garmin Norgescup #2
- 2023 General Hackler Championship, SoCon Men's Golf Championship, Bank of Tennessee Intercollegiate
- 2024 Wake Forest Invitational, SoCon Men's Golf Championship

== Professional wins (2) ==
=== Nordic Golf League wins (1) ===
| No. | Date | Tournament | Winning score | Margin of victory | Runner-up |
|---|---|---|---|---|---|
| 1 | 1 Mar 2026 | Infinitum Championship | −18 (64-62-67=193) | 1 stroke | (Germany) Jonas Baumgartner |

=== Other wins (1) ===
- 2023 Norwegian National Golf Championship (as an amateur)

== Team appearances ==
Amateur

- European Boys' Team Championship (representing Norway): 2017
- European Nations Cup – Copa Sotogrande (representing Norway): 2019
- Eisenhower Trophy (representing Norway): 2022, 2023
- Arnold Palmer Cup (representing International team): 2023
