= 2023 Eisenhower Trophy =

Tournament information
- Dates: 18–21 October 2023
- Location: Abu Dhabi, United Arab Emirates; 24°28′N 54°32′E
- Course: Abu Dhabi Golf Club (National Course)
- Organized by: International Golf Federation
- Format: 72 holes stroke play

Statistics
- Par: 72
- Length: 7,552 yards (6,906 m)
- Field: 36 teams 108 players

Champion
- United States; Nick Dunlap, David Ford, Gordon Sargent
- 540 (−36)
- Location in United Arab Emirates Location in Persian Gulf Location in West Asia

The 2023 Eisenhower Trophy took place 18–21 October at Abu Dhabi Golf Club in Abu Dhabi, United Arab Emirates. It was the 33rd World Amateur Team Championship for the Eisenhower Trophy.

== Venue ==
Abu Dhabi Golf Club had previously hosted the Abu Dhabi Golf Championship on the European Tour 2006 to 2021.

Course layout

Hole	1	2	3	4	5	6	7	8	9	Out	10	11	12	13	14	15	16	17	18	In	Total
Metre	370	548	401	144	402	429	183	523	417	3,417	532	420	161	378	448	182	434	420	509	3,484	6,901
Yards	405	600	439	158	440	469	200	572	456	3,739	582	460	176	414	490	199	475	460	557	3,813	7,552
Par	4	5	4	3	4	4	3	5	4	36	5	4	3	4	4	3	4	4	5	36	72

== Teams ==
36 teams entered the event and completed the competition. Each team had three players.

The top ten finishing teams at the 2022 Eisenhower Trophy and the 2023 host nation were automatically qualified. The field was filled based on the two highest ranked players from each nation in the World Amateur Golf Ranking, with places assured from all five continents in the championship.

Country	Players
Argentina	Joaquín Ludueña, Vicente Marzilio, Segundo Oliva Pinto
Australia	Jack Buchanan, Jeff Guan, Karl Vilips
Austria	Christoph Bleier, Fabian Lang, Florian Schweighofer
Canada	Piercen Hunt, Ashton McCulloch, Brady McKinlay
China	Justin Bai, Zihang Qiu, Ziqin Zhou
Chinese Taipei	Chen Chi-Chun, Lin Chuan-Tai, Su Ching-Hung
Colombia	Carlos Ardila, Manuel Merizalde, Nicolas Quintero Macias
Czech Republic	Petr Hruby, Filip Jakubčík, Louis Klein
Denmark	Gustav Frimodt, Frederik Kjettrup, Jacob Skov Olesen
England	Jack Bigham, Barclay Brown, Tyler Weaver
Finland	Elias Haavisto, Markus Luoma, Jesse Saareks
France	Bastien Amat, Paul Beauvy, Hugo Le Goff
Germany	Jonas Baumgartner, Tiger Christensen, Tim Wiedemeyer
Guam	Markus Nanpei, Eugene Park, Nalapon Vongjalorn
Guatemala	Juan Ricardo Davila Bone, Gabriel Palacios, Alejandro Villavicencio
India	Shaurya Bhattacharya, Rohit Narwal, Yuvraj Singh
Ireland	Alex Maguire, Matthew McClean, Liam Nolan
Italy	Pietro Bovari, Riccardo Fantinelli, Flavio Michetti
Japan	Riura Matsui, Minato Oshima, Yuta Sugiura
Mexico	Santiago De La Fuente, José Cristobal Islas, Omar Morales
Morocco	Soufiane Dahmane, El Mehdi Fakori, Hugo Mazen Trommetter
Netherlands	Jack Ingham, Benjamin Reuter, Lars van der Vight
New Zealand	Jayden Ford, Sam Jones, Kazuma Kobori
Norway	Mats Ege, Michael Mjaaseth, Herman Sekne
Scotland	Connor Graham, Calum Scott, Gregor Tait
Singapore	Ryan Ang, Troy Storm, Hiroshi Tai
South Africa	Christo Lamprecht, Christiaan Maas, Altin van der Merwe
Korea	An Seong-hyeon, Lee Sung-ho, Moon Dong-hyun
Spain	Ángel Ayora, José Luis Ballester, Luis Masaveu
Sweden	Tobias Jonsson, Albert Hansson, Daniel Svärd
Switzerland	Nicola Gerhardsen, Marc Keller, Maximilien Sturdza
Thailand	Jiradech Chaowarat, Ashita Piamkulvanich, Parin Sarasmut
United Arab Emirates	Rayan Ahmed, Thomas Nesbitt, Ahmad Skaik
United States	Nick Dunlap, David Ford, Gordon Sargent
Wales	James Ashfield, Tomi Bowen, Matt Roberts
Zimbabwe	David Amm, Tafadzwa Nyamukondiwa, Keegan Shutt

== Winners ==
Team United States won the trophy for their 16th title, eleven strokes ahead of Australia and Norway, who shared second place, why no team was awarded the bronze medal. It was Norway's first finish on the podium in the history of the event. Defending champion Italy finished tied fifth, 13 strokes behind the winner.

There was no official recognition for the lowest individual score, but Kazuma Kobori, New Zealand, had the best 72-hole aggregate of 272, 16 under par and one better than Nick Dunlap, United States.

== Results ==
Final team standings
Place	Country	Score	To par
1st place, gold medalist(s)	United States	135-137-136-132=540	−36
2nd place, silver medalist(s)	Australia	137-137-139-138=551	−25
2nd place, silver medalist(s)	Norway	144-134-134-139=551	−25
4	France	135-138-139-140=552	−24
5	Italy	142-138-136-137=553	−23
5	New Zealand	139-139-139-136=553	−23
7	South Africa	139-138-138-139=554	−22
T8	Czech Republic	139-135-140-142=556	−20
T8	Ireland	145-139-138-134=556	−20
10	Netherlands	136-140-139-142=557	−19
T11	Denmark	137-138-143-142=560	−16
T11	Mexico	143-133-142-142=560	−16
T11	Spain	138-140-142-140=560	−16
14	Argentina	137-138-146-140=561	−15
T15	England	137-143-142-140=562	−14
T15	Germany	141-141-145-135=562	−14
T17	Canada	146-142-136-139=563	−13
T17	Chinese Taipei	143-136-141-143=563	−13
T17	Japan	142-140-141-140=563	−13
T17	Wales	142-139-141-141=563	−13
T21	China	138-135-144-149=566	−10
T21	Scotland	141-140-140-145=566	−10
T21	Switzerland	142-142-143-139=566	−10
24	Morocco	141-142-143-141=567	−9
T25	Colombia	142-139-138-149=568	−8
T25	Korea	144-142-135-147=568	−8
T27	Guatemala	146-143-139-141=569	−7
T27	Sweden	145-141-140-143=569	−7
T29	Austria	147-144-138-142=571	−5
T29	Singapore	154-142-143-132=571	−5
T31	Finland	149-139-144-141=573	−3
T31	Thailand	149-145-141-138=573	−3
33	India	150-142-148-142=582	+6
34	Zimbabwe	143-147-151-144=585	+9
35	United Arab Emirates	155-153-153-154=615	+39
36	Guam	169-158-157-161=645	+69

Individual leaders
Place	Player	Country	Score	To par
1	Kazuma Kobori	New Zealand	70-70-67-65=272	−16
2	Nick Dunlap	United States	69-67-69-68=273	−15
T3	Bastien Amat	France	68-70-67-69=274	−14
T3	Herman Sekne	Norway	73-64-68-69=274	−14
T5	Pietro Bovari	Italy	67-69-69-70=275	−13
T5	David Ford	United States	68-74-69-64=275	−13
T5	Gordon Sargent	United States	67-70-67-71=275	−13
T8	Christoph Bleier	Austria	73-71-66-67=277	−11
T8	Jeff Guan	Australia	68-69-68-72=277	−11
T8	Filip Jakubcik	Czech Republic	69-67-70-71=277	−11
T8	Christo Lamprecht	South Africa	71-68-68-70=277	−11
T8	Matthew McClean	Ireland	72-68-68-69=277	−11
T8	Michael Mjaaseth	Norway	71-70-66-70=277	−11

Note: There was no official award for the lowest individual scores.
