= Michael Mjaaseth =

Norwegian professional golfer (born 2003)

Personal information
- Nationality: Norway
- Born: 31 March 2003 (age 23) Oslo, Norway

Career
- Sport: Golf
- College: Arizona State University
- Turned professional: 2026
- Current tour: PGA Tour Americas
- Professional wins: 2

Achievements and awards
- Pac-12 Freshman of the Year: 2023

Michael Alexander Mjaaseth (born 31 March 2003) is a Norwegian professional golfer. As an amateur he won the 2019 European Young Masters, 2021 French International Boys Championship, and was runner-up at the 2023 Eisenhower Trophy.

== Amateur career ==
Mjaaseth first made his mark when he won the 2019 European Young Masters ahead of José Luis Ballester. In 2022 he won the Norwegian National Golf Championship, an event open to professional golfers. He won the 2021 French International Boys Championship final against Maxence Giboudot, and lost the final of the 2022 Spanish Amateur to John Gough of England 6 & 5. He made a hole-in-one at the 2023 European Amateur at Pärnu Bay Golf Links in Estonia and was in contention with rounds of 63–66–67, but an untimely final round of 77 saw him finish tied 13th.

Mjaaseth attended Arizona State University 2022–2026 and played with the Arizona State Sun Devils men's golf team. He won his first collegiate event, the Maui Jim Individual, and was awarded the 2023 Pac-12 Freshman of the Year title. He was also named to the GCAA All-Freshman national team as only the 4th Sun Devil in history, after Jon Rahm in 2013, and Preston Summerhays and José Luis Ballester in 2022.

Mjaaseth has played for his national team, and has represented Europe in the Bonallack Trophy against an Asia/Pacific team. He has had success at the Eisenhower Trophy, the World Amateur Team Championships, alongside Herman Wibe Sekne and Mats Ege. They finished 4th in 2022 at Le Golf National in Paris, and in Abu Dhabi in 2023 the team secured a historic silver medal for Norway, only beaten by the U.S. team with Nick Dunlap, David Ford, and Gordon Sargent.

== Professional career ==
Mjaaseth turned professional after graduating in 2026 and made his debut at the Blot Play9 in France, a Challenge Tour event. He placed 12th in the final 2026 PGA Tour University rankings to earn membership of the PGA Tour Americas for the remainder of the 2026 season.

== Amateur wins ==
- 2019 European Young Masters
- 2020 Srixon Tour 1
- 2021 Garmin Norgescup 5, French International Boys Championship
- 2022 Garmin Norgescup 1, International Trophy, Maui Jim Individual
- 2024 Papago Individual

== Professional wins (2) ==
=== Other wins (2) ===
- 2022 Norwegian National Golf Championship
- 2025 Norwegian National Golf Championship

== Team appearances ==
Amateur

- European Boys' Team Championship (representing Norway): 2019, 2021
- Eisenhower Trophy (representing Norway): 2022, 2023, 2025
- Bonallack Trophy (representing Europe): 2023
- Arnold Palmer Cup (representing International team): 2025 (winners)
