= Jacob Skov Olesen =

Danish professional golfer (born 1999)

Personal information
- Nationality: Denmark
- Born: 28 May 1999 (age 27) Roskilde, Denmark
- Height: 6 ft 3 in (191 cm)

Career
- Sport: Golf
- College: Ranger College; Texas Christian University; University of Arkansas
- Turned professional: 2024
- Current tours: PGA Tour; European Tour
- Highest ranking: 84 (15 November 2026) (as of 15 November 2026)

Best results in major championships
- Masters Tournament: DNP
- PGA Championship: DNP
- U.S. Open: DNP
- The Open Championship: T60: 2024

Achievements and awards
- NJCAA Phil Mickelson Outstanding Freshman Award: 2020

Jacob Skov Olesen (born 28 May 1999) is a Danish golfer. He won The Amateur Championship in 2024.

== Amateur career ==
In 2016, Olesen won the International Juniors of Belgium and was runner-up at the English Boys' Open Amateur Stroke Play Championship for the Carris Trophy, where he shot a final round of 62 and lost a playoff to Angus Flanagan. He was bronze medalist at various Danish National Championships for four-straight years, between 2017 and 2020, before winning the Danish National Match Play Championship in 2022. He plays left-handed.

Olesen has represented the Danish National Team, including at the 2017 Junior Golf World Cup in Japan and the 2023 Eisenhower Trophy in Abu Dhabi. His team finished runner-up at the 2023 European Amateur Team Championship, losing to Spain in the final, where Olesen beat José Luis Ballester, 4 and 3.

Olesen attended Ranger College in 2019–20 where he won the Texas Intercollegiate Tournament in his collegiate debut. He finished the season with a scoring average of 69.53 as the top-ranked junior college player according to GolfStat, and received the NJCAA Phil Mickelson Outstanding Freshman Award. He then spent three seasons at Texas Christian University between 2020 and 2023 where he was a co-medalist at The Prestige and named to the Big 12 All-Tournament team. He spent the 2023–24 season as a graduate student at the University of Arkansas, where he earned All-America honors and played in the Arnold Palmer Cup.

In July 2024, Olesen made history by becoming the first Dane to win The Amateur Championship, triumphing, 4 and 3, against Dominic Clemons in the 36-hole final at Ballyliffin Golf Club in Ireland. The victory earned him a spot in the 2024 Open Championship at Royal Troon, where he made the cut to finish tied 60th alongside Phil Mickelson and defending champion Brian Harman.

== Professional career ==
Olesen turned professional in November 2024, following the conclusion of the European Tour Qualifying School; where he was successful in gaining a 2025 European Tour card, having finished inside the top 20 and ties. By turning professional, he forfeited his exemption into the 2025 Masters Tournament and 2025 U.S. Open. He was the first round co-leader at the 2025 Open Championship with an opening 67. However, he played his next 3 rounds in 10-over-par and finished 68th.

== Amateur wins ==
- 2016 Team Rudersdal Open, International Juniors of Belgium
- 2017 Kronborg Masters
- 2018 Mon Open
- 2019 Texas Intercollegiate, High Country Shootout
- 2021 The Prestige
- 2022 Danish National Match Play Championship
- 2024 The Amateur Championship

== Results in major championships ==
Tournament	2024	2025
Masters Tournament		
PGA Championship		
U.S. Open		
The Open Championship	T60	68

Did not play

"T" = Tied

== Team appearances ==
Amateur

- Junior Golf World Cup (representing Denmark): 2017
- Eisenhower Trophy (representing Denmark): 2023
- European Amateur Team Championship (representing Denmark): 2023, 2024
- Arnold Palmer Cup (representing the International team): 2024
- St Andrews Trophy (representing the Continent of Europe): 2024 (winners)

== See also ==
- 2024 European Tour Qualifying School graduates
- 2026 Race to Dubai dual card winners
