= Luis Masaveu =

Spanish professional golfer (born 2002)

Personal information
- Full name: Luis Masaveu Roncal
- Nationality: Spain
- Born: 17 December 2002 (age 23) Madrid, Spain

Career
- Sport: Golf
- Turned professional: 2024
- Current tour: LIV Golf
- Former tour: Challenge Tour

Best results in major championships
- Masters Tournament: DNP
- PGA Championship: DNP
- U.S. Open: DNP
- The Open Championship: 78th: 2024

Luis Masaveu Roncal (born 17 December 2002) is a Spanish professional golfer and LIV Golf player.

== Amateur career ==
Masaveu had a very successful amateur career and reached a best rank of 16th in the World Amateur Golf Ranking. He won the 2023 Tailhade Cup in Argentina and the 2024 Portuguese International Amateur Championship. He was runner-up at the 2022 European Nations Cup - Copa Sotogrande, the 2023 Lytham Trophy, and the 2024 Spanish International Amateur Championship, after finishing 3rd in 2022. He reached the semi-finals of the 2024 U.S. Amateur, where he lost to the eventual champion, his compatriot José Luis Ballester.

He represented Spain twice at the Eisenhower Trophy, and won the European Amateur Team Championship twice, in 2022 and 2023.

Masaveu won low amateur honors at the European Tour's Open de España twice, in 2022 and 2024. In the 2022 edition, he finished 34th.

Masaveu become the first Spanish amateur to make the cut in the Open at the 2024 Open Championship at Royal Troon Golf Club, after earning his spot in the 36-hole Final Qualifying competition at Royal Cinque Ports Golf Club. He prevailed in a three-for-one play-off for the last of four spots against Branden Grace, despite playing with a spare set of incomplete clubs after his bag was lost.

His coach is Gonzalo Fernández-Castaño.

Masaveu finished 3rd in the European Tour's inaugural Global Amateur Pathway ranking to earn Challenge Tour status for 2025.

== Professional career ==
Masaveu turned professional in 2024. He tied for 9th at the 2024 International Series Qatar before signing on with Sergio García's team for the 2025 LIV Golf League. He left LIV after 9 events and $1.5m in individual earnings, having helped García's Fireballs GC to three straight team victories.

Masaveu joined the Challenge Tour, where his best result of the season was a tie for 3rd at the Challenge de España in Girona.

He re-signed with Fireballs GC for the 2026 season, replacing Abraham Ancer.

== Amateur wins ==
- 2018 Campeonato R.S.H.E Club de Campo
- 2020 Campeonato R.S.H.E Club de Campo
- 2023 Tailhade Cup (Argentina)
- 2024 Portuguese International Amateur Championship

== Team appearances ==
=== Amateur ===
- European Amateur Team Championship (representing Spain): 2021, 2022 (winners), 2023 (winners), 2024
- St Andrews Trophy (representing the Continent of Europe): 2022, 2024 (winners)
- Eisenhower Trophy (representing Spain): 2022, 2023
- Bonallack Trophy (representing Europe): 2023
