= 2023 Walker Cup =

Golf tournament

49th Walker Cup Match
- Dates: 2–3 September 2023
- Venue: Old Course at St Andrews
- Location: St Andrews, Scotland
- Captains: Stuart Wilson (GB&I); Mike McCoy (USA)
(United Kingdom) (Republic of Ireland)	11 1/2	14 1/2	(United States)
- United States wins the Walker Cup

Location map
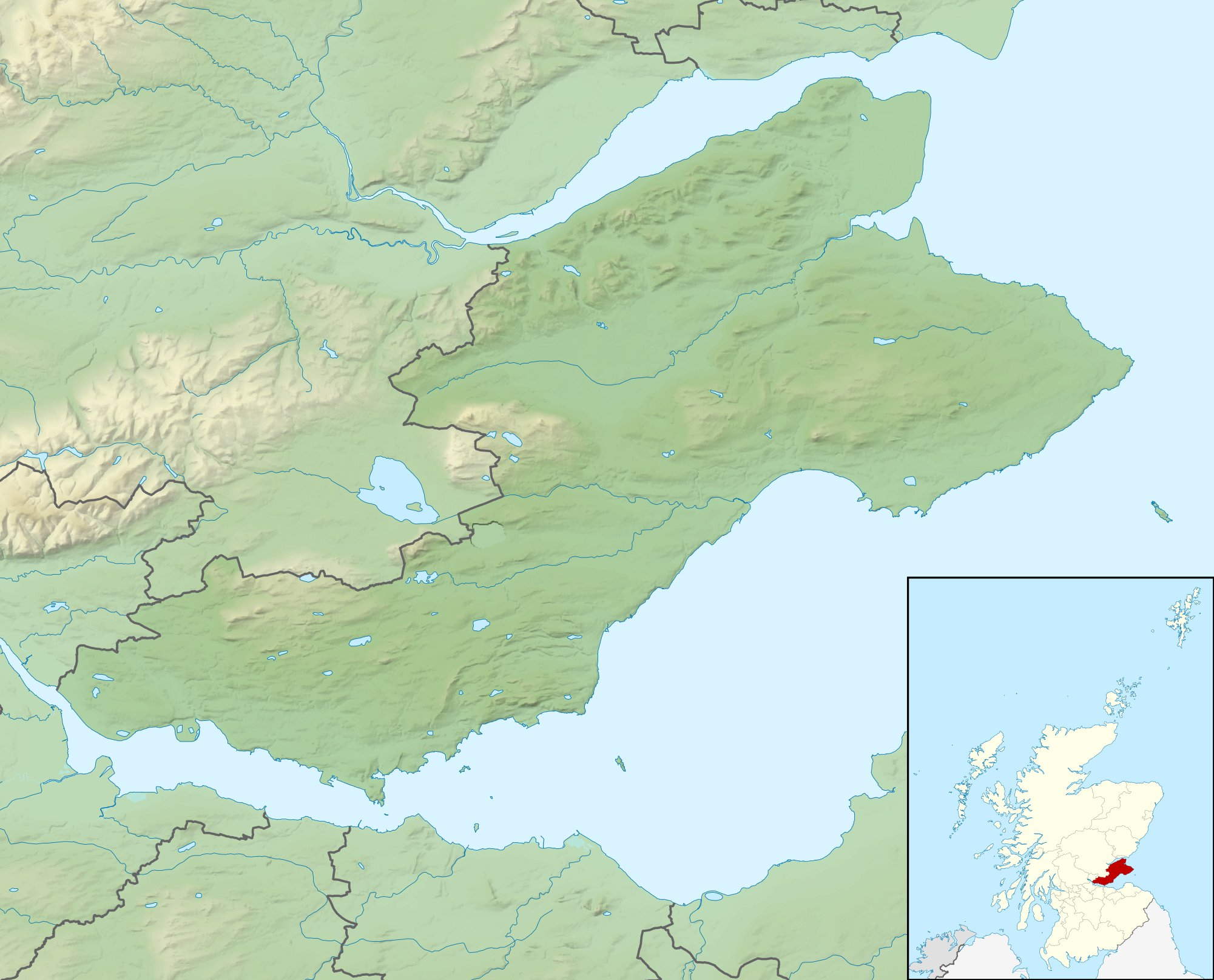
- Location in the United Kingdom Location in Scotland Location in Fife

The 49th Walker Cup Match was played on 2 and 3 September 2023 at Old Course at St Andrews in Scotland. It was the 9th Walker Cup Match to be played at St Andrews and the first since 1975. The United States won by 14 1/2 points to 11 1/2.

== Format ==
On Saturday, there were four matches of foursomes in the morning and eight singles matches in the afternoon. On Sunday, there were again four matches of foursomes in the morning, followed by ten singles matches (involving every player) in the afternoon. In all, 26 matches were played.

Each of the 26 matches is worth one point in the larger team competition. If a match is all square after the 18th hole extra holes are not played. Rather, each side earns 1/2 a point toward their team total. The team that accumulates at least 13 1/2 points wins the competition. In the event of a tie, the previous winner retains the Cup.

== Teams ==
=== Great Britain and Ireland team ===
The Great Britain and Ireland team was announced on 21 August 2023. John Gough and Barclay Brown were automatically selected to the team based on their World Amateur Golf Ranking on 16 August 2023. Gough was ranked 11th and Barclay Brown 25th in this critical release. The reserves were Tyler Weaver and Caolan Rafferty.

& Great Britain & Ireland
Name	Rank	Age	Notes
(Scotland) Stuart Wilson		46	non-playing captain
(Wales) James Ashfield	69	22
(England) Jack Bigham	87	19
(England) Barclay Brown	26	22	Played in 2021
(England) John Gough	14	24
(Scotland) Connor Graham	214	16
(Republic of Ireland) Alex Maguire	143	22
(Northern Ireland) Matthew McClean	54	30
(Republic of Ireland) Liam Nolan	150	22
(Republic of Ireland) Mark Power	98	23	Played in 2021
(Scotland) Calum Scott	31	20

=== U.S. team ===
Gordon Sargent, Michael Thorbjornsen and David Ford were the first players to make the team, as the top three Americans in the World Amateur Golf Ranking as on 21 June 2023. Nick Dunlap and Caleb Surratt were added to the USA line-up on 31 July 2023. On 9 August 2023, Thorbjornsen announced that he would be withdrawing from the USA team due to a stress fracture in his back. The remaining members of the team were announced on 20 August 2023. Two alternates for the team were also announced: Maxwell Moldovan and Neal Shipley.

USA
Name	Rank	Age	Notes
Mike McCoy		60	non-playing captain
Nick Dunlap	5	19
David Ford	4	20
Nick Gabrelcik	9	21
Austin Greaser	10	22
Stewart Hagestad	19	32	Played in 2017, 2019 and 2021
Ben James	7	20
Dylan Menante	6	22
Gordon Sargent	1	20
Preston Summerhays	13	21
Caleb Surratt	8	19

Note: "Rank" is the World Amateur Golf Ranking as of the start of the Cup.

== Saturday's matches ==
=== Morning foursomes ===
	Results	&
Sargent/Menante	(United States) 3 & 2	Brown/Power
Surratt/James	(United Kingdom) (Republic of Ireland) 3 & 2	Scott/Graham
Summerhays/Ford	(United Kingdom) (Republic of Ireland) 1 up	McClean/Gough
Dunlap/Hagestad	(United Kingdom) (Republic of Ireland) 1 up	Maguire/Ashfield
1	Foursomes	3
1	Overall	3

=== Afternoon singles ===
	Results	&
Caleb Surratt	(United States) 4 & 3	Barclay Brown
Nick Gabrelcik	(United Kingdom) (Republic of Ireland) 2 & 1	Calum Scott
Gordon Sargent	(United States) 1 up	Jack Bingham
Austin Greaser	(United Kingdom) (Republic of Ireland) 1 up	Liam Nolan
David Ford	(United Kingdom) (Republic of Ireland) 1 up	Mark Power
Preston Summerhays	halved	Matthew McClean
Stewart Hagestad	(United States) 4 & 3	Alex Maguire
Nick Dunlap	(United Kingdom) (Republic of Ireland) 6 & 5	John Gough
3 1/2	Singles	4 1/2
4 1/2	Overall	7 1/2

== Sunday's matches ==
=== Morning foursomes ===
	Results	&
Surratt/James	(United States) 2 & 1	Gough/McClean
Dunlap/Sargent	(United States) 1 up	Graham/Scott
Summerhays/Gabrelcik	(United States) 2 & 1	Ashfield/Maguire
Menante/Greaser	(United Kingdom) (Republic of Ireland) 4 & 3	Nolan/Power
3	Foursomes	1
7 1/2	Overall	8 1/2

=== Afternoon singles ===
	Results	&
Caleb Surratt	(United States) 3 & 2	Calum Scott
Nick Dunlap	halved	Barclay Brown
Stewart Hagestad	(United States) 3 & 2	Connor Graham
Gordon Sargent	(United States) 1 up	John Gough
Preston Summerhays	(United States) 4 & 3	James Ashfield
Dylan Menante	halved	Matthew McClean
Nick Gabrelcik	(United Kingdom) (Republic of Ireland) 3 & 2	Jack Bingham
Ben James	(United Kingdom) (Republic of Ireland) 1 up	Mark Power
Austin Greaser	(United States) 3 & 1	Liam Nolan
David Ford	(United States) 3 & 2	Alex Maguire
7	Singles	3
14 1/2	Overall	11 1/2
