= John Gough (golfer) =

English professional golfer (born 1992)

Personal information
- Nationality: England
- Born: 23 October 1998 (age 28) Slough, England
- Height: 5 ft 6 in (168 cm)

Career
- Sport: Golf
- College: University of North Carolina at Charlotte
- Turned professional: 2023
- Current tour: European Tour
- Former tours: Challenge Tour; Clutch Pro Tour
- Professional wins: 4

Number of wins by tour
- Challenge Tour: 2
- Other: 2

John Gough (born 23 October 1998) is an English professional golfer and Challenge Tour player. In 2026, he won the Blot Play9 in France.

== Amateur career ==
Gough enjoyed a stellar amateur career and was runner-up 2018 Irish Amateur Open Championship, 2022 Scottish Amateur Stroke Play Championship and 2023 European Nations Cup – Copa Sotogrande, in addition to winning the Spanish Amateur and Lytham Trophy in 2022, and the Australian Master of the Amateurs and Irish Amateur Open Championship in 2023. He reached the semi-finals at The Amateur Championship in 2022, at Royal Lytham & St Annes Golf Club.

Gough also had a prolific national team career, playing in the St Andrews Trophy, Eisenhower Trophy, Bonallack Trophy and Walker Cup.

After attending St Joseph's Catholic High School, Slough, Gough attended University of North Carolina at Charlotte between 2016 and 2021. He won several individual titles, was named to the Conference USA All-Conference First Team several times, and recorded the third best career stroke average in school history (72.59).

== Professional career ==
Gough turned professional in 2023 and joined the 2024 Clutch Pro Tour, where he collected two wins.

He fell a stroke short of securing a 2025 European Tour card at the Q-School and joined the Challenge Tour, where he won the 2026 Blot Play9 wire-to-wire at Golf Bluegreen de Pléneuf Val André in Brittany, France, ahead of Frederik Kjettrup.

== Amateur wins ==
- 2014 U.S. Kids Teen World Championship
- 2015 US Kids - European Championship, BB&O Amateur Championship
- 2019 BB&O Amateur Championship
- 2021 Linger Longer Invitational, Palmetto Amateur, English Amateur
- 2022 Spanish International Amateur Championship, Lytham Trophy
- 2023 Australian Master of the Amateurs, Irish Amateur Open Championship

== Professional wins (4) ==
=== Challenge Tour wins (2) ===
No.	Date	Tournament	Winning score	Margin of victory	Runner-up
1	28 Jun 2026	Blot Play9	−14 (63-69-66-68=266)	2 strokes	(Denmark) Frederik Kjettrup
2	6 Sep 2026	Rosa Challenge Tour	−12 (64-73-64-67=268)	1 stroke	(England) Andrew Wilson

=== Clutch Pro Tour wins (2) ===
No.	Date	Tournament	Winning score	Margin of victory	Runner(s)-up
1	23 May 2024	Cumberwell Park	−18 (64-67-67=198)	1 stroke	(England) Gary King
2	20 Jun 2024	Caversham	−18 (62-68-68=198)	8 strokes	(England) Giles Evans, (Republic of Ireland) Niall Kearney, (England) Thomas Sloman, (England) Daniel Smith, (England) Thomas Thurloway

== Team appearances ==
Amateur

- European Boys' Team Championship (representing England): 2016
- Boys Home Internationals (representing England): 2016 (winners)
- Men's Home Internationals (representing England): 2021
- Women's and Men's Home Internationals (representing England): 2022 (winners)
- European Nations Cup – Copa Sotogrande (representing England): 2022, 2023 (winners)
- European Amateur Team Championship (representing England): 2022, 2023
- St Andrews Trophy (representing Great Britain & Ireland): 2022 (winners)
- Eisenhower Trophy (representing England): 2022
- Bonallack Trophy (representing Europe): 2023
- Walker Cup (representing Great Britain & Ireland): 2023

== See also ==
- 2026 Challenge Tour graduates
