= Mike McCoy (golfer) =

American amateur golfer (born 1962)

Personal information
- Full name: Michael McCoy
- Nationality: United States
- Born: July 3, 1962 (age 64) Des Moines, Iowa, U.S.

Career
- Sport: Golf
- College: Wichita State University
- Status: Amateur
- Professional wins: 1

Best results in major championships
- Masters Tournament: CUT: 2014
- PGA Championship: DNP
- U.S. Open: DNP
- The Open Championship: DNP

Michael McCoy (born November 21, 1962) is an American amateur golfer from West Des Moines, Iowa.

== Early life ==
In 1962, McCoy was born in Des Moines, Iowa. McCoy's ancestors originally came to the United States from Ireland in the early 1900s, settling first in Pennsylvania before moving to Iowa. He claims his love of golf came from his father who he would travel with on occasion back to the hills of South Armagh in Ireland, to visit relatives and sample some of the golf courses around the mountains of Mourne.

He played college golf at Wichita State University.

== Career ==
McCoy is an insurance executive and is also the 2013 U.S. Mid-Amateur champion. He won the honor in 2013 in Birmingham, Alabama. As U.S. Mid-Amateur champion, McCoy was invited to the 2014 Masters Tournament. He shot 78-83=161 to miss the cut.

Among McCoy's golf honors is also a 2009 Amateur Cup win in Iowa. McCoy also captained the 2023 Walker Cup team to victory over Great Britain and Ireland.

== Personal life ==
His son Nate, also an amateur golfer, currently acts as his caddy.

== Tournament wins ==
this list is probably incomplete

- 1994 Iowa Open (as an amateur)
- 2000 Trans-Mississippi Amateur
- 2008 Trans-Mississippi Amateur
- 2013 U.S. Mid-Amateur
- 2022 R&A Senior Amateur Championship
- 2025 U.S. Senior Amateur

== U.S. national team appearances ==
Amateur

- Walker Cup: 2015, 2023 (non-playing captain, winners)
