= Tobias Jonsson (golfer) =

Swedish golfer (born 2000)

Personal information
- Nationality: Sweden
- Born: 12 June 2000 (age 26) Huddinge, Stockholm County, Sweden
- Height: 5 ft 9 in (1.75 m)

Career
- Sport: Golf
- College: Young Harris College; Mercer University
- Turned professional: 2024
- Current tour: European Tour
- Former tours: Challenge Tour; Nordic Golf League

Tobias Jonsson (born 12 June 2000) is a Swedish professional golfer. He won the individual title at the 2022 Eisenhower Trophy, the World Amateur Team Championship.

== Amateur career ==
Jonsson accepted a scholarship to Young Harris College and spent two years playing with the Young Harris Mountain Lions men's golf team, 2019–2021, winning the 2021 Bobcat Invitational. He spent his next three years at Mercer University playing with the Mercer Bears men's golf team, where he won six tournaments.

In 2021, he finished solo third at the Göteborg Open on the Nordic Golf League, two strokes behind winner Jonathan Ågren.

Jonsson joined the Sweden national team in 2022. He won silver at the 2022 European Amateur Team Championship in England, after Sweden lost the final to Spain 4 1/2 to 2 1/2. He birdied the final hole for a score of 17-under 269, a stroke ahead of Japan's Taiga Semikawa, to become the individual leader at the 2022 Eisenhower Trophy. His team, which also consisted of Ludvig Åberg and Adam Wallin, finished in second place behind Italy and ahead of the United States in third.

Jonsson played in the Volvo Car Scandinavian Mixed at Ullna Golf & Country Club on the 2023 European Tour, and made the cut.

In 2023, he represented Europe at the Bonallack Trophy at La Manga Club. Teaming up with Albert Hansson for the foursomes and fourballs he recorded a score of 3–2–0 (W–L–D) for the event. Jonsson made it to match play at the U.S. Amateur and the quarterfinals at The Amateur Championship, to find himself on the 2023–24 Haskins Award pre-season watch list.

In 2024, he won the Augusta Haskins Award Invitational, earning a start at the PGA Tour's 3M Open.

== Professional career ==
Jonsson turned professional after the U. S. Amateur in 2024, and made his pro debut at the Indoor Golf Group Challenge where he finished tied 18th.

He held a two stroke lead ahead of the final round of the 2025 Swiss Challenge but ultimately finished in 3rd, a stroke away from joining the playoff won by Félix Mory.

In November 2025, Jonsson earned promotion to the 2025-26 European Tour, by finishing among the top 20 on the 2025 final Race to Mallorca standings.

== Amateur wins ==
- 2020 Vikingaskeppet, Richard S Johnson Junior Open
- 2021 Bobcat Invitational, Hagge Open, Richard S Johnson Junior Open
- 2022 Wexford Intercollegiate, Eisenhower Trophy (individual), The Carolina Cup, Pinetree Intercollegiate
- 2023 The Cleveland Golf Palmetto, Mark Simpson Colorado Invitational
- 2024 Augusta Haskins Award Invitational

== Team appearances ==
Amateur

- Eisenhower Trophy (representing Sweden): 2022, 2023
- European Amateur Team Championship (representing Sweden): 2022, 2023
- Bonallack Trophy (representing Europe): 2023

== See also ==
- 2025 Challenge Tour graduates
