= Tiger Christensen =

German professional golfer (born 2003)

Personal information
- Nationality: Germany
- Born: 19 August 2003 (age 23) Hamburg, Germany
- Height: 188 cm (6 ft 2 in)

Career
- Sport: Golf
- College: Oklahoma State University; University of Arizona
- Turned professional: 2024
- Current tour: Challenge Tour

Best results in major championships
- Masters Tournament: DNP
- PGA Championship: DNP
- U.S. Open: DNP
- The Open Championship: CUT: 2023, 2026

Tiger Christensen (born 19 August 2003) is a German professional golfer. In 2021, he won the Jacques Léglise Trophy and the European Boys' Team Championship.

== Early life ==
Christensen was born 2003 in Hamburg, to musicians Nicole Safft and Alex Christensen. He attended the Sotogrande International School and trained at the Jason Floyd Golf Academy in Spain.

== Amateur career ==
Christensen is attached to Hamburger GC Falkenstein and joined the German National Team in 2019. The same year he won the European Young Masters with the team and was runner-up at the European Boys' Team Championship, a tournament they won in 2021.

Individually, he won the 2018 R&B German Junior Golf Championship and in 2019 he placed third at the Sir Henry Cooper Junior Masters and was runner-up at the Fairhaven Trophy. In 2020, he won the Triple A European Open and in 2021, the German International Amateur Championship. He finished 7th at the 2023 European Amateur Championship, 4 strokes behind the winner, having led the tournament after two opening rounds of 64.

Christensen enrolled at Oklahoma State University in 2021 and won twice individually playing with the Oklahoma State Cowboys golf team. After three semesters, he transferred to the University of Arizona in the beginning of 2023, where he recorded the second lowest scoring average (71.68) on the Arizona Wildcats men's golf team as a sophomore.

In July 2023, he qualified for his first major, the 2023 Open Championship at Royal Liverpool Golf Club. At the West Lancashire final qualifier, he saw off the likes of Sergio García and Graeme McDowell with rounds of 68 and 67 to finish in a tie for 4th alongside Alex Fitzpatrick, two strokes behind medalist Matt Wallace.

== Professional career ==
Christensen turned professional in November 2024 after making the cut in final stage of DP World Tour Q School.

== Amateur wins ==
- 2018 R&B German Junior Golf Championship
- 2020 Triple A European Open, Golfsportmanufaktur Schäfflertanz Intl. Open
- 2021 German International Amateur Championship, Herb Wimberly Intercollegiate
- 2022 Broncho Invitational
- 2023 Jackson T. Stephens Cup - Stroke Play
- 2024 Arizona Thunderbirds Intercollegiate

== Results in major championships ==
Tournament	2023	2024	2025	2026
Masters Tournament				
PGA Championship				
U.S. Open				
The Open Championship	CUT			CUT

Did not play

CUT = missed the half-way cut

== Team appearances ==
Amateur

- European Young Masters (representing Germany): 2019 (winners)
- Jacques Léglise Trophy (representing Continental Europe): 2021 (winners)
- European Boys' Team Championship (representing Germany): 2019, 2021 (winners)
- European Amateur Team Championship (representing Germany): 2023, 2024
- Bonallack Trophy (representing Europe): 2023
- Eisenhower Trophy (representing Germany): 2023
