= 2025 Masters Tournament =

Major golf championship

- Front cover of the 2025 Masters Journal

Tournament information
- Dates: April 10–13, 2025
- Location: Augusta, Georgia, U.S. 33°30′N 82°01′W
- Course: Augusta National Golf Club
- Tours: PGA Tour; European Tour; Japan Golf Tour

Statistics
- Par: 72
- Length: 7,555 yards (6,908 m)
- Field: 95 players, 53 after cut
- Cut: 146 (+2)
- Prize fund: $21,000,000
- Winner's share: $4,200,000

Champion
- (Northern Ireland) Rory McIlroy
- 277 (−11), playoff
- Location in the United States Location in Georgia

The 2025 Masters Tournament was the 89th edition of the Masters Tournament and the first of the men's four major golf championships held in 2025. The tournament was played from April 10–13 at Augusta National Golf Club in Augusta, Georgia, United States. Rory McIlroy won the tournament after the first hole of a sudden-death playoff against Justin Rose. In doing so, McIlroy became the sixth player, and the first European, to complete the modern career Grand Slam, this being his 11th attempt. Additionally, McIlroy became the third player, after Tiger Woods in 2001 and Scottie Scheffler in 2024, to win the Masters and The Players Championship in the same calendar year.

== Course ==
In September 2024, Hurricane Helene caused damage to the course. In January 2025, Augusta National chairman Fred Ridley said the course was in "spectacular condition" and that, while some trees had been lost, the damage had been "minor". (Note: Augusta National did not disclose how many trees were lost, with reported estimates of "as many as 1,000", to "around 1,500".)

The 12th and 16th holes were among the areas most affected by the tree removals which altered sightlines and may have had a minor impact on wind patterns, particularly at the 12th hole. However, the overall layout and playing characteristics of the course remained largely consistent with the prior year.

Hole	Name	Yards	Par	Hole	Name	Yards	Par
1	Tea Olive	445	4	10	Camellia	495	4
2	Pink Dogwood	585	5	11	White Dogwood	520	4
3	Flowering Peach	350	4	12	Golden Bell	155	3
4	Flowering Crab Apple	240	3	13	Azalea	545	5
5	Magnolia	495	4	14	Chinese Fir	440	4
6	Juniper	180	3	15	Firethorn	550	5
7	Pampas	450	4	16	Redbud	170	3
8	Yellow Jasmine	570	5	17	Nandina	440	4
9	Carolina Cherry	460	4	18	Holly	465	4
Out		3,775	36	In		3,780	36
Source:				Total		7,555	72

== Field ==
Participation in the Masters Tournament is by invitation only, and the tournament has the smallest field of the major championships. There are a number of criteria by which invitations are awarded, including all past winners, recent major champions, leading finishers in the previous year's majors, leading players on the PGA Tour in the previous season, winners of full-point tournaments on the PGA Tour during the previous 12 months, leading players in the Official World Golf Ranking, and some leading amateurs. There were 21 first time Masters competitors this year.

=== Criteria ===
The below list details the qualification criteria for the 2025 Masters Tournament and the players who have qualified under them; any additional criteria under which players qualified are indicated in parentheses.

1. All past winners of the Masters Tournament

- Ángel Cabrera
- Fred Couples
- Sergio García
- Dustin Johnson
- Zach Johnson
- Bernhard Langer
- Hideki Matsuyama (17,18,19,20)
- Phil Mickelson (4)
- José María Olazábal
- Jon Rahm (2,19)
- Patrick Reed (13)
- Scottie Scheffler (5,6,17,18,19,20)
- Charl Schwartzel
- Adam Scott (18,19,20)
- Jordan Spieth
- Bubba Watson
- Mike Weir
- Danny Willett
- Past winners who did not play: Tommy Aaron, Charles Coody, Ben Crenshaw, Nick Faldo, Raymond Floyd, Trevor Immelman, Sandy Lyle, Larry Mize, Jack Nicklaus, Mark O'Meara, Gary Player, Vijay Singh, Craig Stadler, Tom Watson, Tiger Woods, Ian Woosnam, Fuzzy Zoeller.

2. Recent winners of the U.S. Open (2020–2024)

- Wyndham Clark (18,19,20)
- Bryson DeChambeau (13,14,16,19,20)
- Matt Fitzpatrick (19)

3. Recent winners of The Open Championship (2020–2024)

- Brian Harman (17,19,20)
- Collin Morikawa (4,13,16,18,19,20)
- Xander Schauffele (4,13,18,19,20)
- Cameron Smith (13)

4. Recent winners of the PGA Championship (2020–2024)

- Brooks Koepka
- Justin Thomas (18,19,20)

5. Recent winners of The Players Championship (2023–2025)

- Rory McIlroy (14,17,18,19,20)

6. The winner of the gold medal at the Olympic Games (Note: Players qualifying under this category are only eligible for the first Masters Tournament following the Olympic Games.)

7. The winner and runner-up in the 2024 U.S. Amateur

- José Luis Ballester (a)
- Noah Kent (a)

8. The winner of the 2024 Amateur Championship

- Jacob Skov Olesen forfeited his exemption by turning professional. (Note: Olesen turned professional in November 2024 after qualifying for the DP World Tour via Qualifying School, forfeiting his invitation to the Masters.)

9. The winner of the 2024 Asia-Pacific Amateur Championship

- Ding Wenyi forfeited his exemption by turning professional. (Note: Ding turned professional in October 2024 after qualifying for the DP World Tour via the Global Amateur Pathway Ranking, forfeiting his invitation to the Masters.)

10. The winner of the 2025 Latin America Amateur Championship

- Justin Hastings (a)

11. The winner of the 2024 U.S. Mid-Amateur Golf Championship

- Evan Beck (a)

12. The winner of the 2024 NCAA Division I men's golf individual championship

- Hiroshi Tai (a)

13. The leading 12 players, and those tying for 12th place, from the 2024 Masters Tournament

- Ludvig Åberg (17,18,19,20)
- Cameron Davis (17)
- Tommy Fleetwood (18,19,20)
- Tyrrell Hatton (19,20)
- Max Homa (19)
- Matthieu Pavon (18,19)
- Adam Schenk
- Cameron Young (19)
- Will Zalatoris

14. The leading four players, and those tying for fourth place, in the 2024 U.S. Open

- Patrick Cantlay (18,19,20)
- Tony Finau (18,19,20)

15. The leading four players, and those tying for fourth place, in the 2024 Open Championship

- Billy Horschel (18,19,20)
- Thriston Lawrence (19)
- Justin Rose (19,20)

16. The leading four players, and those tying for fourth place, in the 2024 PGA Championship

- Thomas Detry (17,20)
- Viktor Hovland (17,18,19,20)

17. Winners of tournaments on the PGA Tour between the 2024 Masters Tournament and the 2025 Masters Tournament (Note: Includes fall 2024 events, and events must carry full-point allocation towards the FedEx Cup in order to qualify.)

- Keegan Bradley (18,19,20)
- Brian Campbell
- Rafael Campos
- Nico Echavarría (20)
- Austin Eckroat (19)
- Harris English (20)
- Russell Henley (18,19,20)
- Joe Highsmith
- Patton Kizzire
- Min Woo Lee (19,20)
- Robert MacIntyre (18,19,20)
- Matt McCarty (19)
- Maverick McNealy (19,20)
- Taylor Pendrith (18,19,20)
- J. T. Poston (19,20)
- Aaron Rai (18,19,20)
- Davis Riley
- Sepp Straka (18,19,20)
- Nick Taylor (20)
- Davis Thompson (19,20)
- Jhonattan Vegas
- Kevin Yu

18. All players who qualified for and were eligible for the 2024 Tour Championship

- An Byeong-hun (19,20)
- Christiaan Bezuidenhout
- Akshay Bhatia (19,20)
- Sam Burns (19,20)
- Tom Hoge
- Im Sung-jae (19,20)
- Chris Kirk
- Shane Lowry (19,20)
- Sahith Theegala (19,20)

19. The leading 50 players on the Official World Golf Ranking as of December 31, 2024

- Corey Conners (20)
- Jason Day (20)
- Nick Dunlap (20)
- Lucas Glover (20)
- Max Greyserman (20)
- Rasmus Højgaard
- Tom Kim (20)
- Denny McCarthy (20)

20. The leading 50 players on the Official World Golf Ranking as of March 31, 2025

- Daniel Berger
- Laurie Canter
- Stephan Jäger
- Michael Kim
- J. J. Spaun

21. Special Invitations

- Nicolai Højgaard
- Joaquín Niemann

== Pre-tournament events ==
=== Champions Dinner ===
Tuesday, April 8

In keeping with tradition, defending champion Scottie Scheffler chose the menu for the Masters Club Dinner, which took place on April 8. The dinner tradition, which began in 1952 when Ben Hogan invited past Masters champions to dine together, is attended by former champions as members of the Masters Club.

The appetizers were "Scottie-style" cheeseburger sliders, firecracker shrimp, and "Papa Scheff's Meatball and Ravioli Bites". The main courses were Texas-style chili followed by a choice of redfish or ribeye, with a chocolate-chip skillet cookie for dessert. The wine selection included a 2019 Chardonnay from the Russian River Valley and a Napa Valley-sourced 2011 Cabernet Sauvignon.

=== Par 3 Contest ===
Wednesday, April 9

Nico Echavarría won the annual Masters Tournament Par 3 Contest, becoming the first player from Colombia to do so. He secured victory with a birdie on the second hole of a playoff against J. J. Spaun, after both finished five under par through nine holes. Keegan Bradley, Tom Hoge, and Brooks Koepka recorded holes in one ("aces").

== Round summaries ==
=== First round ===
Thursday, April 10, 2025

Jack Nicklaus, Gary Player and Tom Watson started the tournament as the honorary starters. Fred Couples was the first in the field to make an eagle, doing so on the 14th hole, and was followed by Collin Morikawa who made an eagle on the 13th hole.

Justin Rose led for the fifth time after 18 holes at the Masters, setting a new tournament record for most 18-hole leads. He made eight birdies to finish with a round of 65 (−7) and a three-shot lead. Defending champion Scottie Scheffler finished tied for second with a round of 68 (−4) alongside Corey Conners and 2024 runner-up Ludvig Åberg.

Rory McIlroy, attempting a career grand slam, finished with 72 (E) tied for 27th. Nick Dunlap finished with a round of 90 (+18).

Place	Player	Score	To par
1	(England) Justin Rose	65	−7
T2	(Sweden) Ludvig Åberg	68	−4
T2	(Canada) Corey Conners	68	−4
T2	(United States) Scottie Scheffler	68	−4
T5	(United States) Bryson DeChambeau	69	−3
T5	(England) Tyrrell Hatton	69	−3
T7	(United States) Akshay Bhatia	70	−2
T7	(Australia) Jason Day	70	−2
T7	(United States) Harris English	70	−2
T7	(England) Aaron Rai	70	−2

=== Second round ===
Friday, April 11, 2025

Justin Rose continued to lead the pack with a solid second round of 71 (−1), for a 36-hole total of 136 (−8). After having holed out from a green side bunker on hole four for birdie, Bryson DeChambeau went four under in the second round, for 68, with a total score for 36 holes with 137. Rory McIlroy shot the low round of the day, a 66, to move to third place.

53 players at the end of the round made the cut, scoring +2 or better, and advanced to the weekend. No amateurs made the cut. By making the cut, Hideki Matsuyama extended his longest active streak at the majors having made 19 consecutive cuts.

Notables to miss the cut included Bernhard Langer, two-time champion playing in his last Masters, five-time major champion Brooks Koepka, 2020 champion Dustin Johnson, three-time champion Phil Mickelson, and 2017 champion Sergio García.

Place	Player	Score	To par
1	(England) Justin Rose	65-71=136	−8
2	(United States) Bryson DeChambeau	69-68=137	−7
T3	(Canada) Corey Conners	68-70=138	−6
T3	(Northern Ireland) Rory McIlroy	72-66=138	−6
T5	(England) Tyrrell Hatton	69-70=139	−5
T5	(Republic of Ireland) Shane Lowry	71-68=139	−5
T5	(United States) Matt McCarty	71-68=139	−5
T5	(United States) Scottie Scheffler	68-71=139	−5
T9	(Australia) Jason Day	70-70=140	−4
T9	(Denmark) Rasmus Højgaard	73-67=140	−4
T9	(Norway) Viktor Hovland	71-69=140	−4

Amateurs: Hastings (+4), Tai (+6), Beck (+9), Ballester (+10), Kent (+11).

=== Third round ===
Saturday, April 12, 2025

Rory McIlroy took the lead during the third round, including making six straight threes on holes one through six, a first in the tournament. He shot a third round 66, for a 54-hole score of 204 strokes taken. Bryson DeChambeau went three-under par in the third round, a 69, for a 54-hole score of 206 strokes taken. Zach Johnson tied for the lowest round of the day with a 66 (−6) while round one and two leader Justin Rose finished the round +3. Due to having an odd number of players, Augusta National Golf Club member Michael McDermott was paired with Tom Kim.

Place	Player	Score	To par
1	(Northern Ireland) Rory McIlroy	72-66-66=204	−12
2	(United States) Bryson DeChambeau	69-68-69=206	−10
3	(Canada) Corey Conners	68-70-70=208	−8
T4	(Sweden) Ludvig Åberg	68-73-69=210	−6
T4	(United States) Patrick Reed	71-70-69=210	−6
T6	(Australia) Jason Day	70-70-71=211	−5
T6	(Republic of Ireland) Shane Lowry	71-68-72=211	−5
T6	(England) Justin Rose	65-71-75=211	−5
T6	(United States) Scottie Scheffler	68-71-72=211	−5
T10	(Colombia) Nico Echavarría	73-70-69=212	−4
T10	(South Korea) Im Sung-jae	71-70-71=212	−4
T10	(United States) Zach Johnson	72-74-66=212	−4
T10	(United States) Xander Schauffele	73-69-70=212	−4

=== Final round ===
Sunday, April 13, 2025

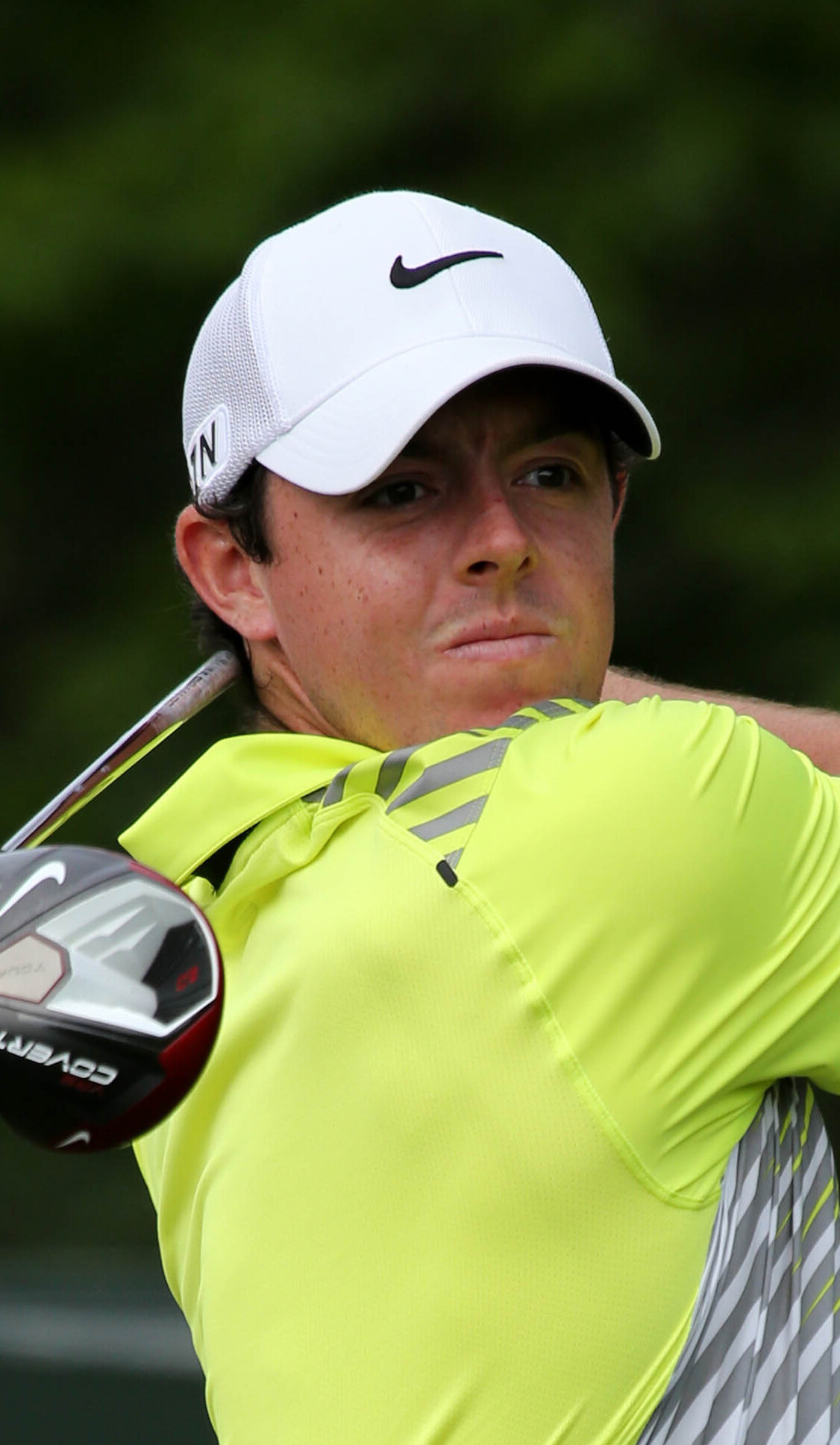
Rory McIlroy won his first Masters title and became the sixth men's golfer to complete a career grand slam.

The 89th Masters was the first full tournament since 2016 to finish without a weather delay in any round. The top 12 players received an invite to the next year's tournament.

Third round leader Rory McIlroy shot a 73, one over par, tying Justin Rose. Rose shot a 66, six under par for the round to tie with McIlroy for a playoff.

McIlroy immediately lost his 54-hole lead after hitting his opening tee shot into a fairway bunker and three-putting the first green for a double bogey. On the second, he again hit his drive into a fairway bunker, missing his birdie putt while DeChambeau took the lead with a two-putt birdie. McIlroy regained a three-shot lead with birdies at 3 and 4, while DeChambeau bogeyed both holes.

At 5 and 7, McIlroy hit erratic tee shots but managed to hit extremely high recovery shots over trees at both holes, leaving himself a short uphill chip at 5 and a short birdie putt at 7. After four pars on holes 5 through 8, he made birdies on 9 and 10 to extend his lead.

On the 11th, McIlroy again drove into the trees right of the fairway, and had to hit a low second shot, which ricocheted off of the mounds short of the green and stopped inches short of the water hazard. DeChambeau then pulled a 9-iron from the middle of the fairway into the water hazard. McIlroy played a conservative chip shot away from the water and missed his par putt, but DeChambeau's double bogey left McIlroy with a four-shot lead.

Meanwhile, Rose's birdie at the 13th was his fifth in seven holes and moved him to −10, three shots behind McIlroy, who made a safe par at the 12th. Holding a three-shot lead in the middle of the 13th fairway, McIlroy decided to lay up short of the water hazard in front of the green, leaving himself 82 yards for his third shot into the par five. With ample room on the green long and left of the hole, McIlroy misplayed his wedge shot, shockingly finding the water hazard short and right of the hole. He failed to get up and down for bogey, reducing his lead to just one shot. He hit another towering approach shot from the trees right of the 14th fairway but failed to get up and down from short of the green, dropping him to −10 into a three-way tie for the lead with Rose and Åberg, who birdied the 15th.

Rose birdied the 16th to take the solo lead. McIlroy hit another remarkable iron shot into the 15th green, hooking a 7-iron around the trees on the left side of the fairway to six feet for a two-putt birdie to join Rose at −11. After bogeying the 17th, Rose holed a long putt on 18 for his tenth birdie of the day to post a score of −11 for the clubhouse lead. Åberg three-putted the 17th green to drop to −9 before triple-bogeying the 18th after hitting the face of the fairway bunker trying to hole his second shot for eagle to tie Rose.

After missing a short birdie putt on 16, McIlroy hit a towering shot from the middle of the fairway on the 17th to three feet, which he converted for birdie to take the lead at −12. After hitting his tee shot into the middle of the 18th fairway, he pushed his wedge shot into a greenside bunker and missed a short par putt to fall into the playoff with Rose.

Champion
(c) = past champion

Place	Player	Score	To par	Money ($)
T1	(Northern Ireland) Rory McIlroy	72-66-66-73=277	−11	Playoff
T1	(England) Justin Rose	65-71-75-66=277	−11	Playoff
3	(United States) Patrick Reed (c)	71-70-69-69=279	−9	1,428,000
4	(United States) Scottie Scheffler (c)	68-71-72-69=280	−8	1,008,000
T5	(United States) Bryson DeChambeau	69-68-69-75=281	−7	798,000
T5	(South Korea) Im Sung-jae	71-70-71-69=281	−7	798,000
7	(Sweden) Ludvig Åberg	68-73-69-72=282	−6	703,500
T8	(Canada) Corey Conners	68-70-70-75=283	−5	588,000
T8	(Australia) Jason Day	70-70-71-72=283	−5	588,000
T8	(United States) Zach Johnson (c)	72-74-66-71=283	−5	588,000
T8	(United States) Xander Schauffele	73-69-70-71=283	−5	588,000

Leaderboard below the top 10
Place	Player	Score	To par	Money ($)
T12	(United States) Harris English	70-73-73-68=284	−4	462,000
T12	(United States) Max Homa	74-70-69-71=284	−4	462,000
T14	(England) Tyrrell Hatton	69-70-75-71=285	−3	336,000
T14	(United States) Tom Hoge	72-72-70-71=285	−3	336,000
T14	(United States) Matt McCarty	71-68-75-71=285	−3	336,000
T14	(United States) Collin Morikawa	72-69-72-72=285	−3	336,000
T14	(Spain) Jon Rahm (c)	75-71-70-69=285	−3	336,000
T14	(United States) Jordan Spieth (c)	73-73-69-70=285	−3	336,000
T14	(United States) Bubba Watson (c)	71-72-74-68=285	−3	336,000
T21	(South Korea) An Byeong-hun	74-71-70-71=286	−2	210,000
T21	(United States) Daniel Berger	71-73-73-69=286	−2	210,000
T21	(England) Tommy Fleetwood	73-69-75-69=286	−2	210,000
T21	(Norway) Viktor Hovland	71-69-73-73=286	−2	210,000
T21	(Japan) Hideki Matsuyama (c)	73-68-79-66=286	−2	210,000
T21	(United States) Davis Riley	73-69-75-69=286	−2	210,000
T27	(United States) Michael Kim	71-71-74-71=287	−1	158,550
T27	(England) Aaron Rai	70-74-73-70=287	−1	158,550
T29	(United States) Denny McCarthy	71-75-71-71=288	E	142,800
T29	(Chile) Joaquín Niemann	72-74-70-72=288	E	142,800
T29	(United States) Sahith Theegala	72-72-73-71=288	E	142,800
T32	(United States) Brian Campbell	72-73-76-68=289	+1	121,538
T32	(United States) Max Greyserman	71-75-69-74=289	+1	121,538
T32	(Denmark) Rasmus Højgaard	73-67-75-74=289	+1	121,538
T32	(United States) Maverick McNealy	72-73-71-73=289	+1	121,538
T36	(United States) Patrick Cantlay	74-72-73-71=290	+2	101,063
T36	(United States) Brian Harman	71-71-77-71=290	+2	101,063
T36	(South Africa) Charl Schwartzel (c)	74-72-72-72=290	+2	101,063
T36	(United States) Justin Thomas	73-71-76-70=290	+2	101,063
T40	(England) Matt Fitzpatrick	71-73-74-73=291	+3	88,200
T40	(Canada) Nick Taylor	73-71-74-73=291	+3	88,200
T42	(United States) Akshay Bhatia	70-76-75-71=292	+4	75,600
T42	(Republic of Ireland) Shane Lowry	71-68-72-81=292	+4	75,600
T42	(United States) J. T. Poston	74-72-73-73=292	+4	75,600
T42	(England) Danny Willett (c)	75-71-73-73=292	+4	75,600
T46	(United States) Sam Burns	73-70-75-75=293	+5	61,180
T46	(United States) Wyndham Clark	76-68-75-74=293	+5	61,180
T46	(United States) Davis Thompson	71-73-70-79=293	+5	61,180
49	(Australia) Min Woo Lee	71-72-77-74=294	+6	54,600
50	(United States) J. J. Spaun	74-72-74-75=295	+7	52,920
51	(Colombia) Nico Echavarría	73-70-69-84=296	+8	51,660
T52	(Germany) Stephan Jäger	72-74-73-78=297	+9	49,980
T52	(South Korea) Tom Kim	73-73-72-79=297	+9	49,980
CUT	(United States) Keegan Bradley	74-73=147	+3	
CUT	(United States) Russell Henley	79-68=147	+3	
CUT	(United States) Dustin Johnson (c)	74-73=147	+3	
CUT	(United States) Chris Kirk	75-72=147	+3	
CUT	(Germany) Bernhard Langer (c)	74-73=147	+3	
CUT	(Puerto Rico) Rafael Campos	75-73=148	+4	
CUT	(United States) Fred Couples (c)	71-77=148	+4	
CUT	(United States) Tony Finau	75-73=148	+4	
CUT	(Spain) Sergio García (c)	72-76=148	+4	
CUT	(Cayman Islands) Justin Hastings (a)	76-72=148	+4	
CUT	(United States) Joe Highsmith	76-72=148	+4	
CUT	(United States) Adam Schenk	73-75=148	+4	
CUT	(Canada) Mike Weir (c)	75-73=148	+4	
CUT	(United States) Billy Horschel	77-72=149	+5	
CUT	(United States) Brooks Koepka	74-75=149	+5	
CUT	(United States) Phil Mickelson (c)	75-74=149	+5	
CUT	(Australia) Adam Scott (c)	77-72=149	+5	
CUT	(Australia) Cameron Smith	71-78=149	+5	
CUT	(Austria) Sepp Straka	78-71=149	+5	
CUT	(United States) Austin Eckroat	76-74=150	+6	
CUT	(Denmark) Nicolai Højgaard	76-74=150	+6	
CUT	(Scotland) Robert MacIntyre	75-75=150	+6	
CUT	(Singapore) Hiroshi Tai (a)	73-77=150	+6	
CUT	(Venezuela) Jhonattan Vegas	75-75=150	+6	
CUT	(Taiwan) Kevin Yu	76-74=150	+6	
CUT	(South Africa) Christiaan Bezuidenhout	76-75=151	+7	
CUT	(Spain) José María Olazábal (c)	77-74=151	+7	
CUT	(United States) Cameron Young	72-79=151	+7	
CUT	(United States) Lucas Glover	78-74=152	+8	
CUT	(United States) Patton Kizzire	79-73=152	+8	
CUT	(Canada) Taylor Pendrith	77-75=152	+8	
CUT	(United States) Will Zalatoris	74-78=152	+8	
CUT	(United States) Evan Beck (a)	77-76=153	+9	
CUT	(Australia) Cameron Davis	74-79=153	+9	
CUT	(Belgium) Thomas Detry	79-74=153	+9	
CUT	(Spain) José Luis Ballester (a)	76-78=154	+10	
CUT	(England) Laurie Canter	77-77=154	+10	
CUT	(France) Matthieu Pavon	78-76=154	+10	
CUT	(Argentina) Ángel Cabrera (c)	75-80=155	+11	
CUT	(United States) Noah Kent (a)	79-76=155	+11	
CUT	(South Africa) Thriston Lawrence	79-76=155	+11	
CUT	(United States) Nick Dunlap	90-71=161	+17	

==== Scorecard ====
Hole	1	2	3	4	5	6	7	8	9	10	11	12	13	14	15	16	17	18
Par	4	5	4	3	4	3	4	5	4	4	4	3	5	4	5	3	4	4
(Northern Ireland) McIlroy	−10	−10	−11	−12	−12	−12	−12	−12	−13	−14	−13	−13	−11	−10	−11	−11	−12	−11
(England) Rose	−6	−6	−7	−6	−5	−5	−6	−7	−7	−7	−8	−9	−10	−9	−10	−11	−10	−11
(United States) Reed	−5	−5	−4	−4	−4	−5	−6	−7	−8	−8	−8	−8	−7	−7	−7	−7	−9	−9
(United States) Scheffler	−5	−5	−5	−4	−5	−5	−6	−7	−7	−7	−7	−6	−7	−8	−8	−8	−8	−8
(United States) DeChambeau	−10	−11	−10	−9	−9	−9	−9	−9	−9	−9	−7	−6	−6	−7	−7	−8	−7	−7
(South Korea) Im	−4	−5	−5	−4	−3	−3	−4	−5	−5	−5	−5	−5	−7	−7	−7	−6	−7	−7
(Sweden) Åberg	−7	−7	−7	−7	−7	−8	−8	−8	−8	−9	−9	−8	−9	−9	−10	−10	−9	−6
(Canada) Conners	−7	−7	−7	−6	−6	−6	−7	−8	−8	−8	−7	−7	−7	−6	−6	−5	−5	−5
(Australia) Day	−5	−5	−5	−5	–6	−6	−6	-6	−7	−7	−7	−7	−7	−7	−7	−7	−6	−5
(Republic of Ireland) Lowry	−5	−6	−5	−5	−3	−2	−2	−3	−2	−1	−1	E	E	+1	+3	+3	+4	+4

Cumulative tournament scores, relative to par

Eagle	Birdie	Bogey	Double bogey	Triple bogey+

==== Playoff ====
In the playoff on the 18th hole, both found the fairway off the tee. After Rose hit the green with his approach, McIlroy redeemed his mistake in regulation with a wedge shot to four feet (1.2 m). After Rose missed his putt, McIlroy converted for birdie to cap an emotional day for his first Masters win, completing the career grand slam. McIlroy became the first to win the Masters while making four double bogeys, which included two in the final round (1,13).

Place	Player	Score	To par	Money ($)
1	(Northern Ireland) Rory McIlroy	3	−1	4,200,000
2	(England) Justin Rose	4	E	2,268,000
