= Frederik Kjettrup =

Danish professional golfer (born 2000)

Personal information
- Nationality: Denmark
- Born: 2 January 2000 (age 26) Aabybro, Denmark

Career
- Sport: Golf
- College: Florida State University
- Turned professional: 2024
- Current tours: Asian Tour; Challenge Tour
- Former tours: LIV Golf; PGA Tour Americas
- Professional wins: 4

Number of wins by tour
- European Tour: 1
- Other: 3

Best results in major championships
- Masters Tournament: DNP
- PGA Championship: DNP
- U.S. Open: CUT: 2024
- The Open Championship: DNP

Frederik Kjettrup (born 2 January 2000) is a Danish professional golfer.

== Amateur career ==
Kjettrup won several big amateur tournaments in Europe prior to moving to the United States to play college golf at Florida State University. While there, he won three tournaments and was a 3-time All-American. He finished eighth in the 2024 PGA Tour University Rankings to earn conditional status on the PGA Tour Americas.

== Professional career ==
Kjettrup turned professional before the U.S. Open in June 2024, where he missed the cut by one stroke. Taking up membership of the PGA Tour Americas, he won the first two tournaments he played on the tour, the Beachlands Victoria Open and the ATB Classic. He also won the CRMC Championship later in the season to finish in second place in the end of season point standings and earn fully exempt status on the Korn Ferry Tour for the 2025 season.

In December 2024, Kjettrup signed with LIV Golf for the 2025 season, joining Martin Kaymer's Cleeks GC team. PGA Tour policy relating to LIV Golf meant he would be ineligible for the Korn Ferry Tour, so he resigned his membership and the exemption was extended to Stuart Macdonald, who had finished 11th in the standings.

In 2026, Kjetterup played on the Asian Tour. He received an invitation to the Blot Play9 in France, a Challenge Tour event, where he finished runner-up, two strokes behind John Gough. He later went on to win the English Trophy in September, on the Challenge Tour.

== Amateur wins ==
- 2017 Titleist & Footjoy West Coast Masters
- 2018 DGU Elite Tour I Drenge, Varderama Open, German Junior Golf Tour U18 Championship - Berliner Golfclub Stolper Heide
- 2019 DM Hulspil (Danish National Match Play Championship)
- 2021 DM slagspil (Danish National Stroke Play Championship)
- 2022 All American Intercollegiate
- 2023 Watersound Invitational
- 2024 ACC Championship

== Professional wins (4) ==
=== Challenge Tour wins (1) ===
No.	Date	Tournament	Winning score	Margin of victory	Runner-up
1	13 Sep 2026	English Trophy	−21 (68-65-67-67=267)	1 stroke	(Switzerland) Ronan Kleu

=== PGA Tour Americas wins (3) ===
No.	Date	Tournament	Winning score	Margin of victory	Runner(s)-up
1	23 Jun 2024	Beachlands Victoria Open	−21 (63-64-64-68=259)	1 stroke	(Argentina) Mateo Fernández de Oliveira
2	30 Jun 2024	ATB Classic	−16 (68-68-67-69=272)	1 stroke	(Argentina) Tommy Cocha, (United States) Johnny Keefer
3	1 Sep 2024	CRMC Championship	−24 (62-63-65-66=256)	2 strokes	(United States) Bryce Lewis

== Results in major championships ==
Tournament	2024
Masters Tournament	
PGA Championship	
U.S. Open	CUT
The Open Championship	

Did not play

CUT = missed the half-way cut

== Team appearances ==
- European Boys' Team Championship (representing Denmark): 2018
- European Amateur Team Championship (representing Denmark): 2020, 2021 (winners), 2022, 2023
- Arnold Palmer Cup (representing the International Team): 2022 (winners), 2023
- Eisenhower Trophy (representing Denmark): 2022, 2023
- Bonallack Trophy (representing Europe): 2023
