= Bonallack Trophy =

Amateur golf competition

The Bonallack Trophy is an amateur golf competition on the model of the Ryder Cup which opposes every two years a European team and a team representing Asia/Pacific. The venue alternates between courses in Europe and Asia/Pacific.

The first competition took place in 1998 in Perth, Australia. Since 2016 it has been held concurrently with the women's Patsy Hankins Trophy. Europe leads the series 7 wins to 4.

It has enjoyed a strong field and past participants include future major winners Justin Rose (1998), Francesco Molinari (2004), Rory McIlroy (2006) and Shane Lowry (2008), plus Hideki Matsuyama, Cameron Smith and Jon Rahm, who all played in 2012.

== Format ==
The Bonallack Trophy involves various match play competitions between players selected from two teams of twelve representing Europe and Asia/Pacific. It takes place over three days, with a total of 32 matches being played, all matches being over 18 holes. The first two days comprise five foursomes matches and five four-ball matches. On the final day, there are 12 singles matches, when all twelve players compete.

The winner of each match scores a point for his team, with a half point each for any match that is tied after the 18 holes. The winning team is determined by cumulative total points. In the event of a tie (16 points each) the Bonallack Trophy is retained by the previous holder.

A foursomes match is a competition between two teams of two golfers. On a particular hole the golfers on the same team take alternate shots playing the same ball. One team member tees off on all the odd-numbered holes, and the other on all the even-numbered holes. Each hole is won by the team that completes the hole in the fewest shots. A fourball match is also a competition between two teams of two golfers, but all four golfers play their own ball throughout the round rather than alternating shots. The better score of the two golfers in a team determines the team's score on a particular hole; the score of the other member of the team is not counted. Each hole is won by the team whose individual golfer has the lowest score. A singles match is a standard match play competition between two golfers.

Year	Day 1		Day 2		Day 3	Total points
Year	Morning	Afternoon	Morning	Afternoon	Day 3	Total points
1998–2016	5 foursomes	5 fourballs	5 foursomes	5 fourballs	12 singles	32
2018	5 fourballs	5 foursomes	5 fourballs	5 foursomes	12 singles	32

== Team qualification and selection ==
=== European Team selection ===
The World Amateur Golf Rankings are used as the main reference for the selection process, in addition to a small number of players selected by the captain (known as "captain's picks"). According to the match conditions, no more than two players may be selected from the same country.

== Results ==
Year	Winners	Score		Losers	Host country	Venue	Europe captain	Asia/Pacific captain
2025	Asia/Pacific	16 1/2	15 1/2	Europe	United Arab Emirates	Al Hamra Golf Club	(France) Joachim Fourquet	(India) Rishi Narain
2023	Asia/Pacific	17	15	Europe	Spain	La Manga Club	(Switzerland) Yves Hofstetter	(India) Rishi Narain
2020	Tournament cancelled ^{[b]}							
2018	Asia/Pacific	16 1/2	15 1/2	Europe	Qatar	Doha Golf Club	(France) Alexis Godillot	(Australia) Matt Cutler
2016	Europe	21 1/2	10 1/2	Asia/Pacific	Portugal	Vidago Palace Golf Course	(France) Alexis Godillot	(Australia) Matt Cutler
2014	Europe	17 1/2	14 1/2	Asia/Pacific	India	Karnataka Golf Association, Bangalore	(Wales) Andrew B. Morgan	(South Korea) Hyung-Mo-Kang
2012	Europe	21 1/2	10 1/2	Asia/Pacific	Portugal	Monte Rei Golf & Country Club	(Wales) Andrew B. Morgan	(Pakistan) Taimur Hassan Amin
2010	Tournament cancelled ^{[a]}							
2008	Europe	20	12	Asia/Pacific	Spain	Valderrama Golf Club	(Spain) Gonzaga Escauriaza	(New Zealand) Roger Brennand
2006	Europe	18	14	Asia/Pacific	New Zealand	Auckland Golf Club	(Spain) Gonzaga Escauriaza	(New Zealand) Roger Brennand
2004	Asia/Pacific	16 1/2	15 1/2	Europe	Italy	Circolo Golf Roma	(Scotland) Colin Wood	(Japan) Taizo Kawata
2002	Asia/Pacific	18	14	Europe	Japan	Hirono Golf Club	(Scotland) Colin Wood	(Japan) Taizo Kawata
2000	Europe	20	12	Asia/Pacific	Spain	Real Club de la Puerta de Hierro	(Spain) Gonzaga Escauriaza	(Australia) Roger Hunt
1998	Europe	18	14	Asia/Pacific	Australia	Lake Karrinyup Golf Club, Perth	(Portugal) Manuel Agrellos	(Australia) Bruce Nairn

^{a} The 2010 tournament was cancelled due to the Icelandic eruptions of Eyjafjallajökull volcano, which restricted air travel of the participants. Venue was to be Karnataka Golf Association, Bangalore, India, who subsequently held the tournament in 2014. ^{b} The 2020 tournament was initially postponed due to the COVID-19 pandemic, and was rescheduled for 2021. In 2021 it was cancelled with the intention to play it in 2023.

== Appearances ==
The following are those who have played in at least one of the matches.

=== Europe ===
- (Finland) Antti Ahokas 2006
- (Sweden) Björn Åkesson 2008
- (Norway) Christian Aronsen 1998
- (Wales) James Ashfield 2023
- (Spain) José Luis Ballester 2025
- (Wales) David Boote 2016
- (Scotland) Wallace Booth 2008
- (England) Barclay Brown 2023
- (France) Edgar Catherine 2018
- (England) Ashley Chesters 2014
- (Germany) Tiger Christensen 2023
- (Italy) Luca Cianchetti 2016
- (England) Todd Clements 2018
- (England) Dominic Clemons 2025
- (Belgium) Nicolas Colsaerts 2000
- (Republic of Ireland) Gary Cullen 2000
- (France) Olivier David 1998
- (Republic of Ireland) Robin Dawson 2018
- (Switzerland) Raphaël De Sousa 2002
- (Belgium) Thomas Detry 2012
- (Germany) Tobias Dier 1998
- (Wales) Jamie Donaldson 1998
- (Northern Ireland) Alan Dunbar 2012
- (Finland) Albert Eckhardt 2014
- (England) Colin Edwards 2002
- (Wales) Nigel Edwards 2002, 2004, 2006, 2008
- (Germany) Sean Einhaus 2008
- (Wales) Rhys Enoch 2012
- (England) Ryan Evans 2014
- (Spain) Gonzalo Fernández-Castaño 2004
- (England) Oliver Fisher 2006
- (Germany) Dominic Foos 2014
- (Scotland) Grant Forrest 2016
- (England) Charlie Forster 2025
- (Republic of Ireland) Noel Fox 2004
- (Spain) Mario Galiano Aguilar 2014, 2016
- (Spain) Alfredo García-Heredia 2002
- (Switzerland) Nicola Gerhardsen 2023
- (Sweden) Oliver Gillberg 2018
- (England) John Gough 2023
- (Wales) Zac Gould 2006
- (Ukraine) Lev Grinberg 2025
- (France) Julien Guerrier 2006
- (Spain) Iván Cantero 2016
- (Germany) Marc Hammer 2018
- (Denmark) Anders Schmidt Hansen 2002
- (Sweden) Albert Hansson 2023
- (Sweden) Peter Hanson 1998
- (England) James Heath 2004
- (France) Benjamin Hébert 2008
- (Spain) Ángel Hidalgo 2018
- (England) Jack Hiluta 2012
- (Denmark) Rasmus Højgaard 2018
- (Finland) Matias Honkala 2018
- (Netherlands) Daan Huizing 2012
- (Republic of Ireland) Jack Hume 2016
- (Finland) Mikko Ilonen 2000
- (Czech Republic) Filip Jakubcik 2025
- (Denmark) Peter Jespersen 2000
- (Sweden) Tobias Jonsson 2023
- (England) Matthew Jordan 2018
- (France) Alexandre Kaleka 2008
- (Sweden) Robert S. Karlsson 2012
- (Republic of Ireland) Ken Kearney 1998
- (Netherlands) Robin Kind 2012
- (Denmark) Frederik Kjettrup 2023
- (Sweden) Algot Kleen 2025
- (Netherlands) Jeroen Krietemeijer 2016
- (France) Frédéric Lacroix 2018
- (Germany) Moritz Lampert 2012
- (Republic of Ireland) Shane Lowry 2008
- (Netherlands) Joost Luiten 2006
- (Scotland) Callum Macaulay 2008
- (Republic of Ireland) Alex Maguire 2023
- (Spain) Pablo Martín 2004
- (Italy) Stefano Mazzoli 2016
- (Scotland) Jack McDonald 2016
- (Republic of Ireland) Brian McElhinney 2004
- (Northern Ireland) Dermot McElroy 2014
- (Northern Ireland) Rory McIlroy 2006
- (Norway) Michael Mjaaseth 2023
- (Italy) Edoardo Molinari 2002, 2004
- (Italy) Francesco Molinari 2004
- (England) Bradley Moore 2016
- (Republic of Ireland) Gavin Moynihan 2014
- (Spain) Pedro Oriol 2006, 2008
- (Italy) Roberto Paolillo 1998
- (Italy) Renato Paratore 2014
- (Scotland) David Patrick 2000
- (Spain) Pablo Ereño Perez 2025
- (Sweden) Robin Petersson 2016
- (Sweden) Mats Pilö 2002
- (Spain) Antonio Pons 1998
- (Spain) Jon Rahm 2012
- (Scotland) Richie Ramsay 2006
- (Scotland) Graham Rankin 1998
- (Italy) Stefano Reale 2000
- (Germany) Christian Reimbold 2002
- (Norway) Kristoffer Reitan 2018
- (Netherlands) Benjamin Reuter 2025
- (Germany) Max Roehrig 2014
- (Spain) Luis Masaveu Roncal 2023
- (England) Justin Rose 1998
- (Scotland) James Ross 2014
- (England) Phil Rowe 2000
- (Spain) Oscar Sánchez 2000
- (Portugal) Hugo Santos 2004
- (Germany) Marcel Schneider 2012
- (Germany) Tino Schuster 2000
- (Norway) Herman Wibe Sekne 2023
- (Sweden) Joel Sjöholm 2008
- (Iceland) Gunnlaugur Árni Sveinsson 2025
- (Denmark) Mads Søgaard 2014
- (England) Matt Stanford 2002
- (England) Ben Taylor 2012
- (Estonia) Richard Teder 2025
- (Norway) Marius Thorp 2006
- (Austria) Manuel Trappel 2012
- (England) Ashton Turner 2016
- (Switzerland) Damian Ulrich 2006
- (Finland) Sami Välimäki 2018
- (Netherlands) Jan-Willem van Hoof 2004
- (Netherlands) Robbie van West 2014
- (Belgium) Didier de Vooght 1998
- (Sweden) Jonas Waahlstedt 2000
- (Scotland) Marc Warren 2002
- (Germany) Peer Wernicke 2025
- (Germany) Tim Wiedemeyer 2025
- (Austria) Martin Wiegele 2002
- (England) Danny Willett 2008
- (Wales) Craig Williams 2000
- (Scotland) Stuart Wilson 2002, 2004
- (England) Gary Wolstenholme 1998, 2000, 2004, 2006
- (England) Chris Wood 2008

=== Asia/Pacific ===
- (Australia) Joshua Bai 2023, 2025
- (New Zealand) Richard Best 1998
- (Australia) Rohan Blizard 2008
- (New Zealand) Carl Brooking 2000
- (Australia) Jack Buchanan 2023
- (New Zealand) Ben Campbell 2012
- (Chinese Taipei) Chan Shih-chang 2008
- (Chinese Taipei) Chan Yih-shin 2000
- (Chinese Taipei) Chang Hong-wei 2002
- (Chinese Taipei) Chen Ming-chuan 2008
- (India) S. Chikkarangappa 2012
- (Chinese Taipei) Chiu Han-ting 2016
- (South Korea) Cho Woo-young 2023
- (Thailand) Varut Chomchalam 2008
- (Australia) Brett Coletta 2016
- (Australia) Harrison Crowe 2023
- (Philippines) Enrique Dimayuga 2025
- (Australia) Andrew Dodt 2006
- (China) Dou Zecheng 2014
- (Australia) Geoff Drakeford 2014
- (India) Samarth Dwivedi 2016
- (Philippines) Anthony Fernando 2008
- (Australia) Nick Flanagan 2004
- (Singapore) Gregory Foo 2016, 2018
- (Australia) Marcus Fraser 2002
- (Japan) Haruo Fujishima 2002, 2004
- (Australia) Scott Gardiner 2000
- (New Zealand) Josh Geary 2006
- (New Zealand) James Gill 2008
- (Philippines) Lloyd Jefferson Go 2018
- (South Korea) Han Jae-min 2018
- (Australia) Luke Hickmott 2002
- (Australia) Jake Higginbottom 2012
- (New Zealand) Daniel Hillier 2018
- (Thailand) Anujit Hirunratanakorn 2006
- (New Zealand) Mathew Holten 2004
- (Japan) Hidemasa Hoshino 1998
- (China) Mu Hu 2006
- (Chinese Taipei) Hung Chien-yao 2012
- (Malaysia) Malcolm Ting Siong Hung 2023
- (Japan) Taichiro Ideriha 2023
- (Japan) Yuta Ikeda 2004, 2006
- (New Zealand) Bradley Iles 2004
- (Japan) Toshiki Ishitoku 2016
- (Japan) Yuki Ito 2006, 2008
- (South Korea) Jang Yu-bin 2023
- (South Korea) Jeong Ji-ho 2002
- (China) Jin Cheng 2014
- (India) Khalin Joshi 2012
- (South Korea) Jung Sung-han 2000
- (India) Harmeet Kahlon 1998
- (Japan) Takumi Kanaya 2016, 2018
- (South Korea) Kang Sung-hoon 2006
- (India) Shiv Kapur 2002, 2004
- (Thailand) Sadom Kaewkanjana 2018
- (Pakistan) Shahid Javed Khan 2000, 2004
- (South Korea) Kim Bi-o 2008
- (South Korea) Kim Dong-min 2018
- (South Korea) Kim Kyung-tae 2004, 2006
- (South Korea) Kim Nam-hun 2014
- (South Korea) Kim Yeong-su 2008
- (Japan) Kenta Konishi
- (India) Ashok Kumar 2000
- (South Korea) Kwon Ki-taek 2002
- (Australia) Brad Lamb 2000
- (Philippines) Rogelio La'o III 1998
- (Australia) Won Joon Lee 2006
- (South Korea) Lee Chang-woo 2012
- (Chinese Taipei) Lee Chieh-po 2014
- (New Zealand) Danny Lee 2008
- (South Korea) Lee Dong-hwan 2004
- (New Zealand) Eddie Lee
- (South Korea) Lee Jae-kyeoung 2016
- (Vietnam) Nguyen Anh Minh 2023, 2025
- (Australia) Min Woo Lee 2018
- (South Korea) Lee Soo-min 2012, 2014
- (Malaysia) Ben Leong 2004, 2006
- (Chinese Taipei) Lin Wen-ko 1998
- (Chinese Taipei) Lin Chuan-tai 2023
- (Thailand) Phichaksn Maichon 2025
- (Australia) Taylor Macdonald 2014
- (New Zealand) Joshua Mann 2014
- (Japan) Hideki Matsuyama 2012
- (Thailand) Prom Meesawat 2002
- (India) Keshav Misra 2002
- (Japan) Yūsaku Miyazato 2000, 2002
- (Hong Kong) Shinichi Mizuno 2014
- (Japan) Taishi Moto 2025
- (Australia) Zach Murray 2016
- (South Korea) Kim Jong Myung 1998
- (Malaysia) Ramasamy Nachimuthu 1998
- (Japan) Rintaro Nakano 2025
- (Thailand) Kammalas Namuangruk 2018
- (Australia) James Nitties 2004
- (Thailand) Thanawin Lee 2025
- (Australia) Geoff Ogilvy 1998
- (Japan) Kazuya Osawa 2018
- (Philippines) Juvic Pagunsan 2004
- (New Zealand) Mathew Perry 2012
- (New Zealand) Mark Purser 2006
- (Philippines) Angelo Que 2000
- (India) Aman Raj 2016
- (Malaysia) Rahizam Ramli 2000
- (Malaysia) Airil Rizman 2000
- (Philippines) Gerald Rosales 1998
- (Australia) Brett Rumford 1998
- (India) Ajeetesh Sandhu 2006
- (Japan) Daichi Sato 2014
- (Japan) Taihei Sato 2012
- (New Zealand) Reon Sayer 1998
- (India) Kartik Singh 2025
- (Australia) Cameron Smith 2012
- (Thailand) Natipong Srithong 2012
- (Australia) Tim Stewart 2008
- (Chinese Taipei) Su Chin-jung 1998
- (Japan) Yuta Sugiura 2023
- (New Zealand) Zackary Swanwick 2025
- (Singapore) Hiroshi Tai 2025
- (Japan) Naoyuki Tamura 2008
- (Japan) Hideto Tanihara 2000
- (India) Karan Taunk 2014
- (India) Rayhan Thomas 2018
- (Australia) Mako Thompson 2023
- (New Zealand) Luke Toomey 2016
- (Hong Kong) Wang Ngai Shen 2025
- (New Zealand) Tim Wilkinson 2002
- (Australia) Shae Wools-Cobb 2018
- (Chinese Taipei) Kevin Yu 2016
- (South Korea) Yun Sung-ho 2016
- (China) Sampson-Yunhe Zheng 2023
- (China) Ziqin Zhou 2025
