= Filip Jakubčík =

Czech professional golfer (born 2003)

Personal information
- Nationality: Czech Republic
- Born: 22 November 2003 (age 22) Holešov, Czech Republic
- Height: 5 ft 10 in (178 cm)

Career
- Sport: Golf
- College: University of Arizona
- Turned professional: 2026
- Current tour: Korn Ferry Tour

Best results in major championships
- Masters Tournament: DNP
- PGA Championship: DNP
- U.S. Open: DNP
- The Open Championship: CUT: 2025

Filip Jakubčík (born 22 November 2003) is a Czech professional golfer. He won the 2025 European Amateur.

== Amateur career ==
Jakubčík graduated from the International Junior Golf Academy (IJGA) in 2022 after winning several events including the AJGA's 2021 Sean Foley Performance Junior Championship, where he shot rounds of 65, 66, and 66 to win by an eight stroke margin.

In Europe, he won the 2021 German Boys Open and the Czech International Amateur Championship for three straight years from 2021 to 2023. He finished tied 31st in the 2022 Kaskáda Golf Challenge, and represented the Czech Republic at the Eisenhower Trophy, and Europe in the 2024 St Andrews Trophy at Royal Porthcawl Golf Club and the 2025 Bonallack Trophy in the United Arab Emirates.

Jakubčík enrolled at the University of Arizona in 2022 and started playing with the Arizona Wildcats men's golf team. He won the Western Intercollegiate both as a junior and sophomore, the first player to defend the title since 1966, and appeared in the Arnold Palmer Cup both years.

In 2025, he became the first Czech player to win the European Amateur, where a final round 67 (−5) at Vasatorp Golf Club in Sweden helped him to a 3-shot victory. The win earned him a start in the 2025 Open Championship at Royal Portrush Golf Club.

== Professional career ==
Jakubčík turned professional in 2026 after finishing in the top-10 of the PGA Tour University rankings. This earned him a Korn Ferry Tour card for the remainder of 2026.

== Amateur wins ==
- 2020 Slovak Amateur Tour #2, Central Florida Classic, Fall Championship
- 2021 Sean Foley Performance Junior Championship, German Boys Open, Czech International Junior Championship, Czech International Amateur Championship, Copa Valle de Mexico
- 2022 Czech International Amateur Championship
- 2023 Czech International Amateur Championship
- 2024 Western Intercollegiate
- 2025 Western Intercollegiate, European Amateur
- 2026 N.I.T., NCAA Marana Regional

== Results in major championships ==
Tournament	2025
Masters Tournament	
PGA Championship	
U.S. Open	
The Open Championship	CUT

Did not play

CUT = missed the half-way cut

== Team appearances ==
Amateur

- European Young Masters (representing the Czech Republic): 2019
- European Boys' Team Championship (representing the Czech Republic): 2019, 2021
- European Amateur Team Championship (representing the Czech Republic): 2022, 2023, 2025
- Eisenhower Trophy (representing the Czech Republic): 2022, 2025
- Arnold Palmer Cup (representing the International team): 2024, 2025 (winners)
- St Andrews Trophy (representing the Continent of Europe): 2024 (winners)
- Bonallack Trophy (representing Europe): 2025
