= 2023 European Amateur Team Championship =

Golf competition

Tournament information
- Dates: 11–15 July 2023
- Location: Lasne, Walloon Brabant, Belgium; 50°41′20″N 04°27′00″E
- Course: Royal Waterloo Golf Club (Marache Course)
- Organized by: European Golf Association
- Format: Qualification round: 36 holes stroke play Knock-out match-play

Statistics
- Par: 72
- Length: 6,859 yards (6,272 m)
- Field: 16 teams 96 players

Champion
- Spain; Ángel Ayora, José Luis Ballester, Javier Barcos, Luis Masaveu, Jaime Montojo, Joseba Torres
- Qualification round: 691 (–29); Final match: 4–3
- Location in Europe Location in Belgium

The 2023 European Amateur Team Championship took place 11–15 July at the Royal Waterloo Golf Club in Lasne, Belgium. It was the 40th men's golf European Amateur Team Championship.

Defending champion team Spain won the championship.

== Venue ==
The hosting club was founded in 1923 by Rodolphe Seeldrayers. The Marache Course was designed by architect Fred Hawtree and established in 1961 in Ohain, Lasne, in the region of Wallon Brabant, close to the historic Waterloo battlefield, 20 kilometres south-east of the city center of Brussels, Belgium. The greens were renovated by Martin Hawtree, son of Fred Hawree, 2004–2005.

=== Course layout ===
Hole	Meters	Par	Hole	Meters	Par
1	378	4	10	296	4
2	314	4	11	407	4
3	498	5	12	170	3
4	169	3	13	375	4
5	490	5	14	352	4
6	410	4	15	146	3
7	139	3	16	430	4
8	322	4	17	500	5
9	406	4	18	470	5
Out	3,126	36	In	3,146	36
Source:		Total		6,272	72

== Format ==
Each team consisted of six players. On the first two days each player played 18 holes of stroke play each day. The lowest five scores from each team's six players counted to the team total each day.

The eight best teams formed flight A, in knock-out match-play over the following three days. The teams were seeded based on their positions after the stroke play. The first placed team was drawn to play the quarter final against the eight placed team, the second against the seventh, the third against the sixth and the fourth against the fifth. Teams were allowed to use six players during the team matches, selecting four of them in the two morning foursome games and five players in to the afternoon single games. Teams knocked out after the quarter finals played one foursome game and four single games in each of their remaining matches. Extra holes were played in games that were all square after 18 holes. However, if the result of the team match was already decided, undecided games were declared halved.

The teams outside the top eight in the stroke-play stage formed flight B, also played knock-out match-play, but with one foursome game and four single games in each match, to decide their final positions.

== Teams ==
16 nation teams contested the event. Qualified were the top 13 teams from the 2022 European Amateur Team Championship, the host nation team Belgium and the two top teams from the 2022 European Amateur Team Championship Division 2. Each team consisted of six players.

Players in the participating teams
Country	Players
Belgium	Nathan Cossement, Anthony De Schutter, Dewi Merckx, Charles Roeland, Louis Theys, Tom Viellard
Croatia	Lovro Horvat, Arthur Mijić, Ivan Ninković, Marko Stepinac, Ivan Vučemil, Leo Zurovac
Denmark	Frederik Kjettrup, Gustav Frimodt, Jacob Skov Olesen, Kristian Hjort Bressum, Mads Laage Hansen, Jens Kristian Thysted
England	Jack Bigham, Barclay Brown, James Claridge, Arron Edwards-Hill, John Gough, Dylan Shaw-Radford
Estonia	Carl Hellat, Kevin Christopher Jegers, Ralf Johan Kivi, Richard Teder, Markus Varjun, Mattias Varjun
Finland	Markus Luoma, Elias Haavisto, Veikka Viskari, Jaapo Jämsä, Eeli Kujanpää, Oskari Nikku
France	Martin Couvra, Bastien Amat, Quentin Debove, Paul Beauvy, Maxence Giboudot, Theo Boulet
Germany	Jonas Baumgartner, Tiger Christensen, Wolfgang Glawe, Yannick Malik, Carl Siemens, Tim Tillmanns
Ireland	Alex Maguire, Max Kennedy, Matthew McClean, Liam Nolan, Mark Power, Caolan Rafferty
Italy	Pietro Bovari, Matteo Cristoni, Lucas Nicolas Fallotico, Riccardo Fantinelli, Flavio Michetti, Julien Paltrinieri
Netherlands	Thijmen Batens, Jack Ingham, Jerry Ji, Benjamin Reuter, Lars van der Vight, Bob van der Voort
Slovenia	Jan Ciric, Nejc Cop Tomsic, Jan Hribernik, Luka Naglic, Luka Strasek, Ziga Strasek
Spain	Ángel Ayora, José Luis Ballester, Javier Barcos, Luis Masaveu, Jaime Montojo,, Joseba Torres
Sweden	Algot Kleen, Albert Hansson, David Lundgren, Tobias Jonsson, Alfons Bondesson, Daniel Svärd
Switzerland	Patrick Foley, Nicola Gerhardsen, Ronan Kleu, Loïc Naas, Max Schliesing, Maximilien Sturdza
Wales	James Ashfield, Tomi Bowen, Caolan Burfold, Archie Davies, James Nash, Matt Roberts

== Winners ==
Team Denmark led the opening 36-hole stroke-play competition with a 32-under-par score of 688, three strokes ahead of defending champion team Spain with team England in third place a further two strokes behind.

There was no official award for the lowest individual score, but individual leader was José Luis Ballester, Spain, with an 11-under-par score of 133, one stroke ahead of Barclay Brown, England.

Team Spain, with three players remaining from last years triumph, won the gold medal, playing their seventh final and earning their sixth title, beating team Denmark in the final 4–3.

Team Ireland, a combined team from the Republic of Ireland and Northern Ireland, earned third place, after beating England 6–1 in the bronze match.

== Results ==
Qualification round

Team standings
Place	Country	Score	To par
1	Denmark	345-343=688	−32
2	Spain	345-346=691	−29
3	England	350-343=693	−27
4	Ireland	352-345=697	−23
5	France	352-348=700	−20
6	Netherlands	347-356=703	−17
7	Italy	347-357=704	−16
8	Sweden	346-360=706	−14
9	Switzerland	351-358=709	−11
10	Finland	356-357=713	−7
11	Estonia	360-354=714	−6
12	Wales	350-365=715	−5
13	Germany	352-367=719	−1
14	Belgium	373-360=733	+13
15	Slovenia	370-376=746	+26
16	Croatia	380-372=752	+32

Individual leaders
Place	Player	Country	Score	To par
1	José Luis Ballester	Spain	65-68=133	−11
2	Barclay Brown	England	66-68=134	−10
T3	Jacob Skov Olesen	Denmark	68-67=135	−9
T3	Max Scliesing	Switzerland	67-68=135	−9
T5	Ricardi Fantinelli	Italy	66-71=137	−7
T5	Gustav Frimodt	Denmark	69-68=137	−7
T5	Max Kennedy	Ireland	69-68=137	−7
T5	Luis Masaveu	Spain	70-67=137	−7
T5	Caolan Raffarty	Ireland	71-66=137	−7
T5	Matt Roberts	Wales	68-69=137	−7
T5	Jens Kristian Thysted	Denmark	68-69=137	−7

Note: There was no official award for the lowest individual score.

Flight A

Bracket

Quarter finals
Denmark	5
Sweden	2
Ireland	4
France	3
England	5.5
Netherlands	1.5
Spain	5
Italy	2

Semi finals
Denmark	4.5
Ireland	2.5
Spain	4.5
England	2.5

Final
Spain	4
Denmark	3
Bronze match
Ireland	6
England	1

Elimination matches
Sweden	2
France	3
Netherlands	3.5
Italy	1.5

Match for 5th place
France	3
Netherlands	2
Match for 7th place
Italy	3.5
Sweden	1.5

Final games

Spain	Denmark
4	3
J.L. Ballester / J. Montojo 4 & 3	J.S. Olesen / G. Frimodt
L. Masaveu / A. Ayora 22nd hole	F. Kjettrup / J.K. Thysted
Javier Barcos	Frederik Kjettrup 3 & 2
Luis Masaveu	Gustav Frimodt 5 & 4
José Luis Ballester	Jacob Skov Olesen 4 & 3
Jaime Montojo 2 & 1	Kristian Hjort Bressum
Ángel Ayora 3 & 2	Mads Laage

Flight B

Bracket

Round 1
Switzerland	4.5
Croatia	0.5
Wales	4.5
Germany	0.5
Estonia	3.5
Belgium	1.5
Finland	3.5
Slovenia	1.5

Round 2
Wales	3
Switzerland	2
Finland	3
Estonia	2

Match for 9th place
Finland	3
Wales	2
Match for 11th place
Switzerland	3.5
Estonia	1.5

Elimination matches
Germany	4
Croatia	1
Slovenia	4
Belgium	1

Match for 13th place
Germany	5
Slovenia	0
Match for 15th place
Belgium	5
Croatia	0

Final standings
Place	Country
1st place, gold medalist(s)	Spain
2nd place, silver medalist(s)	Denmark
3rd place, bronze medalist(s)	Ireland
4	England
5	France
6	Netherlands
7	Italy
8	Sweden
9	Finland
10	Wales
11	Switzerland
12	Estonia
13	Germany
14	Slovenia
15	Belgium
16	Croatia

== See also ==
- Eisenhower Trophy – biennial world amateur team golf championship for men organized by the International Golf Federation.
- European Amateur Championship – European amateur individual golf championship for men organised by the European Golf Association.
- European Ladies' Team Championship – European amateur team golf championship for women organised by the European Golf Association.
