= 2022 Eisenhower Trophy =

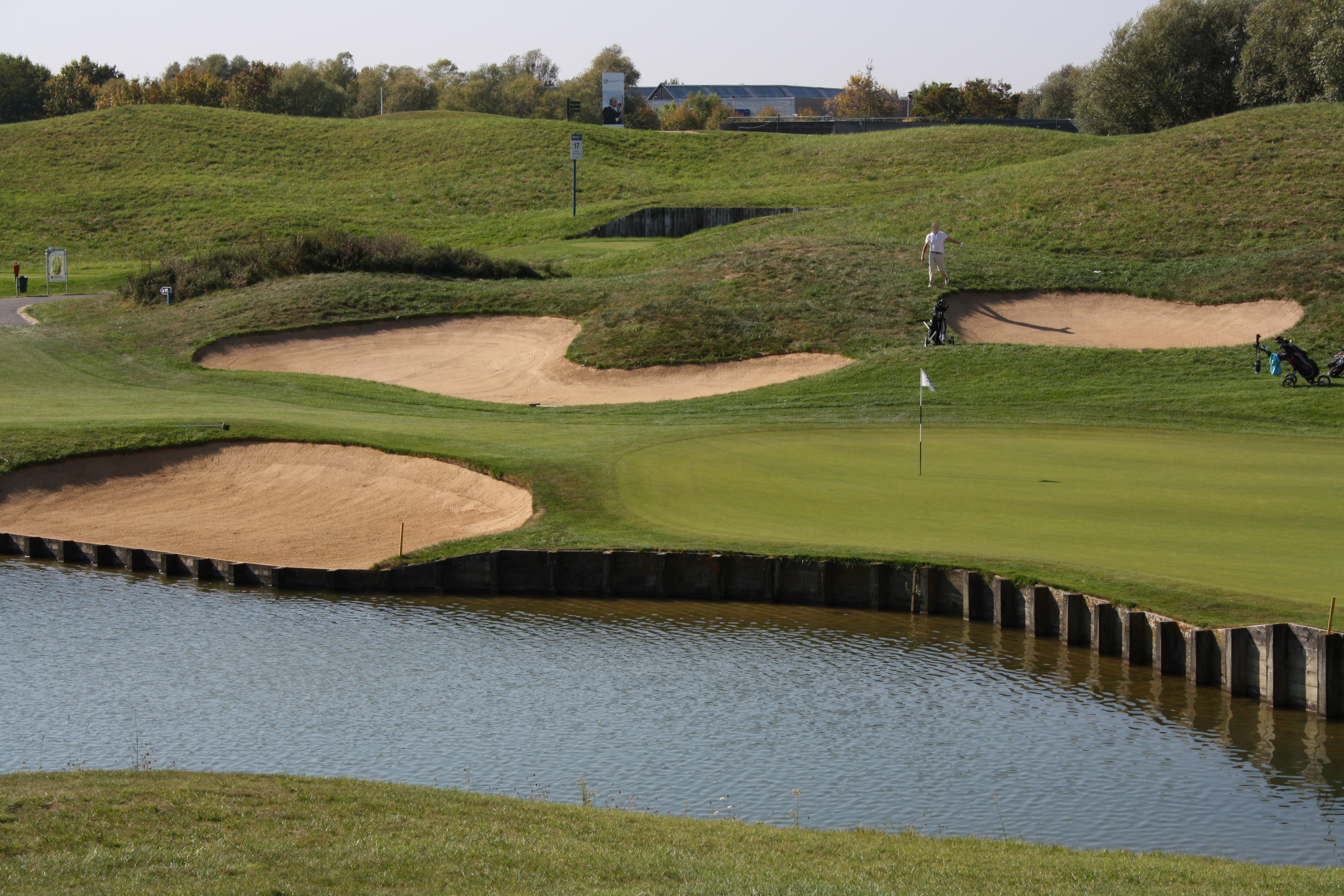
- Albatros Course at Le Golf National

Tournament information
- Dates: 31 August – 3 September 2022
- Location: Guyancourt, France; 48.7532°N 2.0755°E
- Courses: Le Golf National (Albatros course); Golf de Saint-Nom-la-Bretèche (Red course)
- Organized by: World Amateur Golf Council
- Format: 72 holes stroke play

Statistics
- Par: 71 (Le Golf National); 72 (Golf de Saint-Nom-la-Brèteche)
- Length: 6,991 yards (6,393 m) (Le Golf National); 6,821 yards (6,237 m) (Golf de Saint-Nom-la-Brèteche)
- Field: 71 teams 213 players

Champion
- Italy; Pietro Bovari, Filippo Celli, Marco Florioli
- 541 (−31)
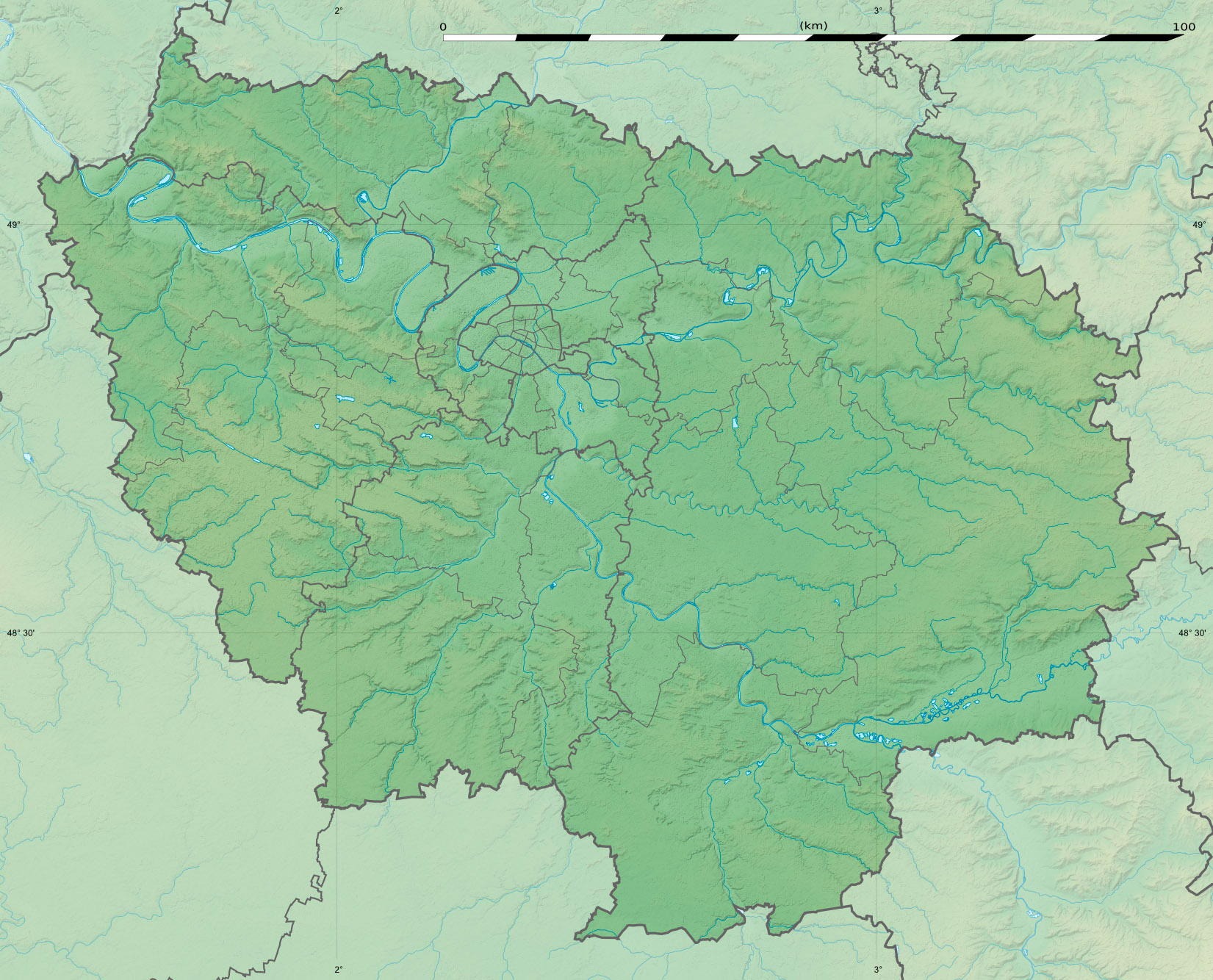
- Location in Europe Location in France Location in Île-de-France

The 2022 Eisenhower Trophy took place 31 August – 3 September at Le Golf National and Golf de Saint-Nom-la-Bretèche south-west of Paris, France. It was the 32nd World Amateur Team Championship for the Eisenhower Trophy.

Defending champion was team Denmark.

== Format ==
The tournament was a 72-hole stroke play team event. Each team of three players played two rounds at Le Golf National and two rounds at Golf de Saint-Nom-la-Bretèche in different orders. The best placed teams played Golf National in the fourth round. The best two scores for each round counted towards the team total.

== Venues ==
Course layout

Le Golf National (Albatros Course)

Hole	1	2	3	4	5	6	7	8	9	Out	10	11	12	13	14	15	16	17	18	In	Total
Metre	374	169	509	398	371	349	420	180	497	3,267	339	162	402	351	520	368	147	427	407	3,123	6,390
Yards	409	185	540	435	406	382	459	197	544	3,574	371	177	440	384	569	403	161	467	445	3,417	6,991
Par	4	3	5	4	4	4	4	3	5	36	4	3	4	4	5	4	3	4	4	35	71

Golf de Saint-Nom-la-Bretèche (Red Course)

Hole	1	2	3	4	5	6	7	8	9	Out	10	11	12	13	14	15	16	17	18	In	Total
Metre	332	386	148	410	450	394	514	385	171	3,190	379	333	495	187	324	366	170	460	337	3,051	6,241
Yards	363	422	162	448	491	429	562	421	187	3,485	414	364	541	205	354	400	186	503	369	3,336	6,841
Par	4	4	3	4	5	4	5	4	3	36	4	4	5	3	4	4	3	5	4	36	72

== Teams ==
71 teams contested the event. Each team had three players.

Players in the leading teams

Country	Players
Argentina	Mateo Fernández de Oliveira, Juan Martín Loureiro Segundo, Oliva Pinto
Australia	Connor McKinney, Harrison Crowe, Hayden Hopewell
Austria	Christoph Bleier, Fabian Lang, Maximilian Steinlechner
Belgium	Matthis Besard, Adrien Dumont de Chassart, James Skeet
Canada	A.J. Ewart, Garrett Rank, Johnny Travale
Chile	Martin Leon, Lukas Roessler, Clemente Silva
China	Wenyi Ding, Ziqin Zhou, Tianyi Xiong
Colombia	Carlos Ardila, Manuel Merizalde, Nicolas Quintero Macias
Costa Rica	Paul Chaplet, Jose Ignacio Cordero, Nicolas Tobon
Czech Republic	Filip Jakubčík, Dominik Pavoucek, Jiri Zuska
Denmark	Hamish Brown, Frederik Kjettrup, Rasmus Neergaard-Petersen
England	Sam Bairstow, Arron Edwards-Hill, John Gough
Ecuador	Ben Cohn, Nico Escobar, Philippe Thorin Andretta
Estonia	Kevin Christopher Jegers, Markus Varjun, Mattias Varjun
Finland	Elias Haavisto, Antti-Jussi Lintunen, Markus Luoma
France	Martin Couvra, Julien Sale, Tom Vaillant
Germany	Anton Albers, Jonas Baumgartner, Laurenz Schiergen
Guatemala	Miguel Leal, Gabriel Palacios, Alejandro Villavicencio
Hong Kong	Leon Philip D'Souza, Taichi Kho, Alex Yang
Iceland	Hlynur Bergsson, Sigurdur Blumenstein, Hakon Magnusson
India	Raghav Chugh, Milind Soni, John Thomas
Ireland	Matthew McClean, Robert Moran, Mark Power
Italy	Pietro Bovari, Filippo Celli, Marco Florioli
Japan	Keita Nakajima, Kohei Okada, Taiga Semikawa
Mexico	Santiago De La Fuente, José Islas, José Antonio Safa
Netherlands	Jack Ingham, Benjamin Reuter, Lars van der Vight
New Zealand	James Hydes, Sam Jones, Kazuma Kobori
Norway	Mats Ege, Michael Mjaaseth, Herman Sekne
Poland	Jakub Dymecki, Alejandro Pedryc, Andrzej Wierzba Jr.
Portugal	Hugo Camelo, Daniel Rodrigues, Pedro Cruz Silva
Puerto Rico	Jeronimo Esteve, Roberto Nieves, Diego Saavedra Davila
Scotland	Callum Bruce, Rory Franssen, Calum Scott
Serbia	Nikola Ćuić, Dane Cvetkovic, Marko Jokić
Singapore	Ryan Ang, James Leow, Hiroshi Tai
South Africa	Christo Lamprecht, Christiaan Maas, Aldrich Potgieter
South Korea	Hae-cheon An, Min-hyuk Song, Hyun-joon Yoo
Spain	José Luis Ballester, Luis Masaveu, David Puig
Sweden	Ludvig Åberg, Tobias Jonsson, Adam Wallin
Switzerland	Nicola Gerhardsen, Cedric Gugler, Maximilien Sturdza
Thailand	Arsit Areephun, Pongsapak Laopakdee, Ashita Piamkulvanich
United States	Austin Greaser, Gordon Sargent, Michael Thorbjornsen
Wales	James Ashfield, Archie Davies, Luke Harries

== Results ==
Leader after the first round was team Japan on 130. Japan was still leading after the second round on 264.

In the third round team Sweden advanced from tied eleventh, 13 strokes behind Japan, to take the lead with a 23-under-par score of 307, one stroke ahead of Italy, Japan and United States, all three of them tied second.

Italy won the championship with a total score of 31-under-par 541, one stroke ahead of Sweden.

Final team standings

Place	Country	Score	To par
1st place, gold medalist(s)	Italy	135-134-139-133=541	−31
2nd place, silver medalist(s)	Sweden	137-140-130-135=542	−30
3rd place, bronze medalist(s)	United States	136-135-137-137=545	−27
4	Norway	138-135-139-135=547	−25
5	Spain	136-137-138-138=549	−23
6	France	135-135-139-142=551	−21
7	Japan	130-134-144-144=552	−20
T8	Austria	137-147-133-138=555	−17
T8	Wales	139-137-139-140=555	−17
10	Finland	142-139-138-137=556	−16
T11	Argentina	141-137-135-144=557	−15
T11	Belgium	144-134-140-139=557	−15
T11	Denmark	141-143-138-135=557	−15
14	England	136-145-140-137=558	−14
15	Australia	139-137-144-139=559	−13
16	Germany	135-141-142-143=561	−11
T17	Canada	141-135-148-139=563	−9
T17	Colombia	144-138-140-141=563	−9
T19	Ireland	142-145-140-137=564	−8
T19	South Africa	139-141-143-141=564	−8
21	Singapore	139-140-144-142=565	−7
T22	Chile	146-138-141-141=566	−6
T22	Hong Kong	139-143-142-142=566	−6
24	Switzerland	137-142-140-148=567	−5
T25	Czech Republic	143-144-139-142=568	−4
T25	Iceland	141-143-141-143=568	−4
T25	Thailand	148-144-133-143=568	−4
28	Estonia	146-136-141-146=569	−3
29	Guatemala	145-138-147-141=571	−1
30	Netherlands	142-142-149-139=572	E
T31	China	144-146-141-142=573	+1
T31	India	145-143-143-142=573	+1
33	Scotland	142-148-140-144=574	+2
T34	Ecuador	145-142-148-142=577	+5
T34	New Zealand	144-142-149-142=577	+5
36	Puerto Rico	147-142-145-145=579	+7
T37	Panama	150-146-143-143=582	+10
T37	Portugal	145-146-136-155=582	+10
T37	South Korea	146-142-142-152=582	+10
T40	Mexico	152-140-146-145=583	+11
T40	Turkey	147-148-143-145=583	+11
42	Cayman Islands	154-144-145-145=588	+16
T43	Chinese Taipei	145-150-144-151=590	+18
T43	Morocco	150-151-148-141=590	+18
45	Brazil	147-147-146-151=591	+19
46	Venezuela	150-143-146-154=593	+21
47	Luxembourg	149-147-149-149=594	+22
48	Lithuania	143-153-149-150=595	+23
T49	Bulgaria	148-152-144-152=596	+24
T49	Slovakia	149-148-151-148=596	+24
51	Slovenia	151-148-149-150=598	+26
T52	Dominican Republic	156-150-144-149=599	+27
T52	Poland	151-153-144-151=599	+27
54	Serbia	150-154-153-146=603	+31
55	Philippines	150-147-159-148=604	+32
56	Hungary	153-149-149-156=607	+35
57	Saudi Arabia	151-156-146-155=608	+36
T58	Egypt	158-148-148-158=612	+40
T58	Ukraine	159-151-147-155=612	+40
60	Croatia	151-158-152-154=615	+43
61	Zimbabwe	157-151-158-150=616	+44
62	Trinidad and Tobago	157-147-158-157=619	+47
63	Costa Rica	160-153-152-156=621	+49
64	Bermuda	157-158-160-151=626	+54
65	Pakistan	160-161-154-153=628	+56
66	Qatar	158-160-157-155=630	+58
67	Uruguay	152-163-157-161=633	+61
68	United Arab Emirates	160-151-168-156=635	+63
69	Guam	167-164-156-152=639	+67
70	Bahrain	172-157-158-160=647	+75
71	Lebanon	168-172-159-163=662	+90

Individual leaders

There was no official recognition for the lowest individual scores.

Place	Player	Country	Score	To par
1	Tobias Jonsson	Sweden	67-72-64-66=269	−17
2	Taiga Semikawa	Japan	63-65-69-73=270	−16
3	Austin Greaser	United States	68-67-69-67=271	−15
T4	Maximilian Steinlechner	Austria	69-69-67-67=272	−14
T4	David Puig	Spain	66-66-72-68=272	−14
T4	Filippo Celli	Italy	67-65-70-70=272	−14
T7	Tom Vaillant	France	69-65-70-69=273	−13
T7	Ludvig Åberg	Sweden	70-68-66-69=273	−13
T9	Archie Davies	Wales	65-69-69-71=274	−12
T9	Michael Mjaaseth	Norway	70-68-68-68=274	−12

== See also ==
- 2022 Espirito Santo Trophy
