= David Ford (golfer) =

American professional golfer (born 2002)

Personal information
- Nationality: United States
- Born: September 14, 2002 (age 24) Peachtree Corners, Georgia, U.S.
- Height: 5 ft 8 in (1.73 m)

Career
- Sport: Golf
- College: University of North Carolina
- Turned professional: 2025
- Current tour: PGA Tour

Achievements and awards
- ACC Freshman of the Year: 2022
- ACC Player of the Year: 2023
- Haskins Award: 2025

David Ford (born September 14, 2002) is an American professional golfer. In 2023, he won the Walker Cup, Arnold Palmer Cup and Eisenhower Trophy with the U.S. teams.

== Amateur career ==
Ford had success as a junior golfer and in 2020 won the Junior Players Championship and the Rolex Tournament of Champions, where he shot a 10-under 62. In 2021, he won the AJGA Wyndham Cup with a perfect 4–0–0 record, and tied for second in stroke play at the Western Amateur. He earned medalist honors at the U.S. Amateur Four-Ball with Kelly Chinn, scoring a 16-under 127.

Ford enrolled at University of North Carolina at Chapel Hill in 2021 as the No. 1 player in the Rolex AJGA and Golfweek junior rankings. Playing with the North Carolina Tar Heels men's golf team, he was named 2022 ACC Freshman of the Year, and 2023 ACC Player of the Year.

He won the 2022 Southern Amateur and 2023 Jones Cup Invitational, where he birdied the final hole to win by one stroke over Caleb Surratt. He made his first PGA Tour start at the 2023 Barbasol Championship, where he made the cut.

Ford shot an eight-under par 64 to lead the U.S. team with Nick Dunlap and Gordon Sargent to victory in the 2023 Eisenhower Trophy, the World Amateur Team Championship, in Abu Dhabi.

== Professional career ==
Ford turned professional in May 2025. He earned his PGA Tour card via the PGA Tour University Ranking.

== Personal life ==
Ford is a triplet and his siblings are Maxwell and Abigail. Maxwell is also an accomplished golfer. Only David plays left-handed, and Maxwell is three inches taller. Their father Patrick played golf at Georgia State.

== Amateur wins ==
- 2018 AJGA Junior All-Star at Butte Creek
- 2019 E-Z-GO Vaughn Taylor Championship
- 2020 AJGA Invitational at Sedgefield, Junior Players Championship, Bobby Chapman Junior Invitational, Rolex Tournament of Champions
- 2022 Southern Amateur, Jackson T. Stephens Cup
- 2023 Williams Cup, Jones Cup Invitational
- 2024 Ben Hogan Collegiate Invitational, Williams Cup
- 2025 Valspar Intercollegiate Invitational, Augusta Haskins Award Invitational, Tar Heel Intercollegiate

== U.S. national team appearances ==
- Walker Cup: 2023 (winners)
- Arnold Palmer Cup: 2023 (winners), 2024 (winners)
- Eisenhower Trophy: 2023 (winners)
- The Spirit International Amateur Golf Championship : 2024
