= Nick Dunlap =

American professional golfer (born 2003)

Personal information
- Full name: Nicholas Dunlap
- Nationality: United States
- Born: December 23, 2003 (age 22) Huntsville, Alabama, U.S.
- Height: 6 ft 3 in (1.91 m)

Career
- Sport: Golf
- College: University of Alabama
- Turned professional: 2024
- Current tour: PGA Tour
- Professional wins: 2
- Highest ranking: 30 (October 20, 2024) (as of October 25, 2026)

Number of wins by tour
- PGA Tour: 2
- European Tour: 1

Best results in major championships
- Masters Tournament: CUT: 2024, 2025
- PGA Championship: CUT: 2024, 2025
- U.S. Open: CUT: 2022, 2023, 2024, 2025
- The Open Championship: DNP

Achievements and awards
- PGA Tour Rookie of the Year: 2024

Nicholas Dunlap (born December 23, 2003) is an American professional golfer who plays on the PGA Tour. He won the U.S. Junior Amateur in 2021 and the U.S. Amateur in 2023. With his victory at The American Express in 2024, Dunlap became the first amateur in 33 years to win a PGA Tour tournament. He subsequently turned professional, ending his amateur career ranked number one in the World Amateur Golf Ranking.

== Early life ==
Born on December 23, 2003, to parents Charlene and Jim Dunlap in Birmingham, Alabama, Dunlap is an only child. The family briefly moved to Greenville, South Carolina before Dunlap's freshman year of high school, and he was then homeschooled when they returned to Alabama.

Dunlap displayed talent in golf from a young age at his home club, Greystone Golf & Country Club. Brian Speakman, lead instructor at Greystone, recalled in 2021 that Dunlap was "extremely athletic" and also a "pretty high-level" baseball and football player. He was a finalist in the National Football League's Punt, Pass, and Kick competition in 2013. When he was 12, Dunlap shot a round of 59 at Highland Park Golf Course in Birmingham, Alabama, during a junior tournament which he won by 13 strokes.

== Amateur career ==
Dunlap won the Alabama State Junior Championship in 2018. He was runner-up in the 14-18 division of the 2020 Notah Begay III Junior Golf National Championship, the 2021 Junior Players Championship, and the 2021 Boy's Junior PGA Championship. He won the 2021 Dustin Johnson World Junior Championship, the 2021 American Junior Golf Association (AJGA) Polo Golf Junior Classic, and the 2021 U.S. Junior Amateur, defeating Cohen Trolio, 3 and 2, in the final. This win made Dunlap the first native of Alabama to claim the U.S. Junior Amateur title, and granted him an exemption to the 2022 U.S. Open. He was subsequently named the 2021 AJGA Boys Golfer of the Year.

Ranked as the No. 1 junior golfer in the class of 2022 according to Golfweek, Dunlap committed to the University of Alabama to study finance and play for the Alabama Crimson Tide golf team. He is a lifelong Alabama fan, and had known Alabama's golf coach Jay Seawell since the age of 10. Dunlap battled with tendonitis in his left wrist during his freshman season. He claimed his first individual collegiate win at the Linger Longer Invitational in March 2023. He then won the Northeast Amateur in June, and the North and South Amateur in July.

Dunlap won the U.S. Amateur in August 2023. He was five over par through his first seven holes of the stroke play portion, but rallied to make the cut. He defeated Gordon Sargent in the first round of the match play en route to reaching the final, where he beat Neal Shipley, 4 and 3, to win the title. This made Dunlap the second golfer in history to win both the U.S. Junior Amateur and U.S. Amateur championships, after Tiger Woods. Following his U.S. Amateur victory, Dunlap represented the United States team at the 2023 Walker Cup and the 2023 Eisenhower Trophy. The United States won both titles, and Dunlap was the runner-up in the individual stroke play at the 2023 Eisenhower Trophy.

In January 2024, Dunlap received a sponsor exemption to play in The American Express on the PGA Tour. In the third round, he shot a 12-under 60, tying Patrick Cantlay's record for the lowest round by an amateur on the PGA Tour. This gave Dunlap a three-shot lead heading into the final round. Dunlap shot 2-under in the final round to win the tournament by one stroke. He became the first amateur to win a PGA Tour event since Phil Mickelson won the Tucson Open in 1991. At 20 years and 29 days old, Dunlap also became the second-youngest winner on the PGA Tour in the past 90 years, behind Jordan Spieth who won at 19 years and 352 days old, and he is the first amateur player to have won the U.S. Junior Amateur, U.S. Amateur, and a PGA Tour event. Due to his amateur status, Dunlap was ineligible for the winner's prize money of $1,512,000, which instead went to runner-up Christiaan Bezuidenhout. The win moved Dunlap from third to first in the World Amateur Golf Ranking, which takes into account the performance of amateurs in both amateur and professional tournaments.

== Professional career ==
The week after his American Express victory, Dunlap announced that he was turning professional and had accepted PGA Tour membership. He struggled for form afterwards and stated he had difficulty adapting to life as a professional golfer. In his first six months, he recorded only one top-10 finish, and missed the cut at each of the three major championships he played. In July 2024, Dunlap recorded his second PGA Tour win and his first as a professional at the Barracuda Championship, an opposite field event to The Open Championship. Dunlap was exempt into The Open due to his win at the 2023 U.S. Amateur, but forfeited the exemption by turning professional. With the win, Dunlap became the first player in PGA Tour history to win in the same season as both an amateur and as a professional. He received the PGA Tour Rookie of the Year award for 2024.

At the 2025 Masters Tournament, Dunlap shot an 18-over-par 90 in the first round. He bounced back with a 71 in the second round, the largest round-to-round improvement in the tournament since Craig Wood shot 88-67 at the 1936 Masters Tournament. Dunlap struggled throughout the 2025 PGA Tour season and by September he ranked last on tour in strokes gained off-the-tee.

== Amateur wins ==
- 2018 Alabama State Junior Championship
- 2021 Dustin Johnson World Junior Championship, AJGA Polo Golf Junior Classic, U.S. Junior Amateur
- 2023 Linger Longer Invitational, Northeast Amateur, North and South Amateur, U.S. Amateur, SEC Stroke Play

== Professional wins (2) ==
=== PGA Tour wins (2) ===
No.	Date	Tournament	Winning score	Margin of victory	Runner-up
1	Jan 21, 2024	The American Express (as an amateur)	−29 (64-65-60-70=259)	1 stroke	(South Africa) Christiaan Bezuidenhout
2	Jul 21, 2024	Barracuda Championship^{1}	49 pts (12-7-11-19=49)	2 points	(United States) Vince Whaley

^{1}Co-sanctioned by the European Tour

== Results in major championships ==
Tournament	2022	2023	2024	2025
Masters Tournament			CUT	CUT
PGA Championship			CUT	CUT
U.S. Open	CUT	CUT	CUT	CUT
The Open Championship				

Did not play

CUT = missed the half-way cut

== Results in The Players Championship ==
Tournament	2025
The Players Championship	CUT

CUT = missed the half-way cut

== U.S. national team appearances ==
Amateur

- Eisenhower Trophy: 2023 (winners)
- Walker Cup: 2023 (winners)
