= Josele Ballester =

Spanish professional golfer (born 2003)

José Luis Ballester
Personal information
- Full name: José Luis Ballester Barrio
- Nickname: Josele
- Nationality: Spain
- Born: 18 August 2003 (age 23) Castellón de la Plana, Castellón, Spain
- Height: 6 ft 0 in (1.83 m)
- Weight: 180 lb (82 kg; 13 st)

Career
- Sport: Golf
- College: Arizona State University
- Turned professional: 2025
- Current tour: European Tour
- Former tour: LIV Golf
- Professional wins: 1

Number of wins by tour
- Asian Tour: 1

Best results in major championships
- Masters Tournament: CUT: 2025
- PGA Championship: DNP
- U.S. Open: CUT: 2025
- The Open Championship: T46: 2026

José Luis "Josele" Ballester Barrio (born 18 August 2003) is a Spanish professional golfer who plays on LIV Golf. He won the 2020 Spanish Amateur, 2023 European Amateur and 2024 U.S. Amateur.

== Early life and family ==
Ballester was born in Castellón and is known as Josele. His parents are José Luis Ballester, an Olympic swimmer, and Sonia Barrio, a field hockey player who won gold at the 1992 Summer Olympics. Ballester is coached by Sergio García's father and considers Sergio to be a mentor, and uses Joaquín Niemann's mental coach.

== Amateur career ==
Ballester had a successful junior career and lost the final of the 2018 Boys Amateur Championship at Royal Portrush Golf Club to Conor Gough, 3 and 1. In 2019, he won the Spanish U-16 Championship and played for Spain in the European Young Masters, where he won silver at Kunětická Hora in the Czech Republic. He was runner-up at the 2019 Junior Orange Bowl International and the 2020 Desert Amateur in the United States.

Ballester won the 2020 Spanish Amateur at Real Club Sevilla Golf, beating Jannik de Bruyn of Germany, 3 and 1, in the final.

Ballester attended Arizona State University from 2021 to 2025, and played with the Arizona State Sun Devils men's golf team, where he earned All-American honors twice. He has trained with Sun Devils alumni Jon Rahm and Phil Mickelson. At the 2022 Arnold Palmer Cup in Switzerland, he replaced Eugenio Chacarra who turned professional before the event. Ballester won 3.5 of 4 possible points as the international team beat the Americans 33–27.

In 2023, he won the European Amateur by 2 strokes at Pärnu Bay Golf Links in Estonia, which earned him invitation to the 2023 Open Championship at Royal Liverpool Golf Club.

He won the 2024 U.S. Amateur, 2 up, against Noah Kent at Hazeltine National Golf Club to capture the Havemeyer Trophy.

In 2025, Ballester competed in the Masters Tournament and made headlines during the first round when he urinated in a tributary of Rae's Creek. He was seen by some members of the crowd, who cheered; Ballester – who shot a 4-over-par 76 in the round – later remarked that it was "Probably one of the claps that I really got today real loud. So that was kind of funny." Initially, Ballester appeared unremorseful, saying, "It was not embarrassing at all for me. If I had to do it again, I would do it again." He later clarified that he had apologized to Augusta National Golf Club. Ballester followed his 76 on Thursday with a 6-over 78 on Friday, missing the cut by eight shots.

== Professional career ==
Ballester finished third in the PGA Tour University standings, earning him full Korn Ferry Tour status, but declined membership in June 2025 and signed with Sergio García's Fireballs GC team on the LIV Golf League, making his professional debut at the Washington, D.C. event. In November, he claimed his first professional victory at the PIF Saudi International.

== Amateur wins ==
- 2018 Campeonato Sub18 Comunidad Valenciana, Campeonato Absoluto de las Comunidad Valenciana
- 2019 Campeonato de Castellon, Campeonato de Espana Sub-16
- 2020 Spanish Amateur (Copa S.M. el Rey), Copa Match Play Comunidad Valenciana
- 2023 European Amateur, European Amateur Team Championship (individual medalist)
- 2024 U.S. Amateur, OFCC/Fighting Illini Invitational

== Professional wins (1) ==
=== Asian Tour wins (1) ===
Legend
International Series (1)
Other Asian Tour (0)

No.	Date	Tournament	Winning score	Margin of victory	Runner-up
1	22 Nov 2025	PIF Saudi International	−22 (66-65-66-65=262)	3 strokes	(United States) Caleb Surratt

== Playoff record ==
LIV Golf League playoff record (0–1)

No.	Year	Tournament	Opponents	Result
1	2025	LIV Golf Chicago	(South Africa) Dean Burmester, (Spain) Jon Rahm	Burmester won with birdie on first extra hole

== Results in major championships ==
Tournament	2023	2024	2025	2026
Masters Tournament			CUT	
PGA Championship				
U.S. Open			CUT	
The Open Championship	CUT			T46

Did not play

CUT = missed the half-way cut
"T" = tied

== Team appearances ==
Amateur

- European Young Masters (representing Spain): 2019
- European Boys' Team Championship (representing Spain): 2019, 2021
- European Amateur Team Championship (representing Spain): 2022, 2023 (winners), 2024
- Arnold Palmer Cup (representing the International team): 2022 (winners), 2023, 2024
- Eisenhower Trophy (representing Spain): 2023
- Bonallack Trophy (representing Europe): 2025

== See also ==
- 2026 European Tour Qualifying School graduates
