= Gordon Sargent =

American professional golfer (born 2003)

Personal information
- Nationality: United States
- Born: May 27, 2003 (age 23) Birmingham, Alabama, U.S.
- Height: 6 ft 0 in (183 cm)
- Weight: 175 lb (79 kg)

Career
- Sport: Golf
- College: Vanderbilt University
- Turned professional: 2025
- Current tour: PGA Tour

Best results in major championships
- Masters Tournament: CUT: 2023
- PGA Championship: DNP
- U.S. Open: T39: 2023
- The Open Championship: CUT: 2024

Achievements and awards
- Mark H. McCormack Medal: 2023

Gordon Sargent (born May 27, 2003) is an American professional golfer. In 2022, he won the NCAA Division I Men's Individual Championship. He reached number 1 in the World Amateur Golf Ranking in February 2023, and in June he was the low amateur in the 2023 U.S. Open.

== Early life ==
Sargent was born on May 27, 2003, in Birmingham, Alabama and grew up in nearby Mountain Brook. His father, Seth, was an amateur golfer who participated in events such as George C. Thomas Invitational and the Crump Cup. Sargent's family were members of the Country Club of Birmingham and Shoal Creek Club. Sargent took a liking to golf at age nine when he participated in the Future Masters in Dothan, Alabama. Sargent co-founded the Alabama Cup charity event, which raised more than $150,000 for the American Junior Golf Association (AJGA) Ace Grant and Alabama charities.

== Amateur career ==
Sargent won two AJGA events in his career, the 2017 Evitt Foundation RTC Junior All-Star and the 2018 TaylorMade/Adidas Golf Junior All-Star. In 2019, Sargent won the Alabama Boys State Junior Championship. In 2020, he became the youngest player to win the Alabama State Amateur in the modern era. He broke the tournament scoring record with a 24-under 264. He repeated as Alabama State Amateur champion a year later. Sargent attended Mountain Brook High School where he was a member of three AHSAA State Golf Championship teams and earned low medalist honors in two of those years. In his senior year of high school, he was named the USA Today Male Golfer of the Year. Sargent signed to play college golf at Vanderbilt University.

In April 2022, Sargent won the Mossy Oak Collegiate for his first collegiate victory. One month later, Sargent won the NCAA Division I Individual Championship after making birdie on the first hole of a four-man playoff. He became the ninth freshman to win the NCAA individual title. Sargent received the Phil Mickelson Outstanding Freshman Award for the 2021-2022 season. He was also named SEC Freshman of the Year and selected to the All-SEC First Team. Sargent was named First-team All-American by Ping and Golfweek.

In January 2023, Sargent was awarded a special invitation to play in the 2023 Masters Tournament. He was the first amateur golfer to receive such an invitation since Aaron Baddeley in 2000. He would end up missing the cut. In February 2023, Sargent won the John Hayt Invitational, which resulted in him moving up to number 1 in the World Amateur Golf Ranking. In April 2023, Sargent won the Mason Rudolph Championship. Sargent's accomplishments in his sophomore year resulted in him being named SEC and Golfweek player of the year and was once again named First-team All-American by Ping.

In June 2023, Sargent successfully qualified for the U.S. Open, where he made the cut and earned low amateur honors. In August, he was awarded the Mark H. McCormack Medal as the leading player in the World Amateur Golf Ranking. In October, Sargent was a member of the American team that won the 2023 Eisenhower Trophy.

In October 2023, Sargent earned PGA Tour membership through PGA Tour University Accelerated program after achieving the 20-point threshold. He was eligible to take up the membership following the conclusion of the 2024 NCAA Division I men's golf championship but decided to defer his membership and return to Vanderbilt for his senior year.

In April 2024, Sargent won his second consecutive Mason Rudolph Championship, joining Sam Horsfield as the only golfers to have won the Mason Rudolph Championship on more than one occasion. One month later, Sargent finished tied for second in the 2024 NCAA Division I men's golf championship, one shot behind Hiroshi Tai. Sargent was once again named First-team All-American by Ping and Golfweek.

Sargent struggled in his senior year, posting a 73.63-per-round average for the season, four strokes above his career average entering his senior year. In eight college starts as a senior, he had just one top-30 finish and had placed outside the top 50 in all five starts during the spring, including tying for 75th place at the SEC Championship. Sargent was left out of the lineup three times during the season, including the NCAA regionals.

== Professional career ==
Sargent turned professional in June 2025. He earned his PGA Tour card through the PGA Tour University Accelerated.

== Amateur wins ==
- 2019 Alabama State Junior Championship
- 2020 Alabama State Amateur
- 2021 Alabama State Amateur
- 2022 Mossy Oak Collegiate, NCAA Division I Individual Championship
- 2023 John Hayt Invitational, Mason Rudolph Championship
- 2024 Mason Rudolph Championship

== Results in major championships ==
Tournament	2023	2024
Masters Tournament	CUT	
PGA Championship		
U.S. Open	T39LA	CUT
The Open Championship		CUT

Did not play

LA = low amateur
CUT = missed the half-way cut

== U.S. national team appearances ==
- Arnold Palmer Cup: 2022, 2024 (winners)
- Eisenhower Trophy: 2022, 2023 (winners)
- Walker Cup: 2023 (winners)
