= Daniel Olsson =

Swedish professional golfer

Personal information
- Nationality: Sweden
- Born: 27 April 1975 (age 51)
- Children: 3

Career
- Sport: Golf
- Turned professional: 1998
- Former tour: Swedish Golf Tour
- Professional wins: 1

Best results in major championships
- Masters Tournament: DNP
- PGA Championship: DNP
- U.S. Open: DNP
- The Open Championship: CUT: 1997

Daniel Olsson (born 27 April 1975) is a former Swedish professional golfer. He won the European Amateur in 1996.

== Career ==
Representing the Swedish National Team, Olsson collected medals both in European and World championships. He won the 1993 European Boys' Team Championship in Switzerland where his team, including Johan Axgren, Kalle Brink and Johan Edfors, beat England 6–1 in the final. Olsson was part of the Swedish teams, winning bronze at the 1995 European Amateur Team Championship in Antwerp, Belgium and finished fourth in the 1997 event at Portmarnock Golf Club, Dublin. He also finished forth at the 1996 European Youths' Team Championship in Madeira, while at the 1996 Eisenhower Trophy, the Swedish team, with Olsson, Martin Erlandsson, Chris Hanell and Leif Westerberg, earned the silver medal.

Olsson won the Motoman Robotics Open on the Swedish Golf Tour in May 1996 while still an amateur, but the crowning achievement of his amateur career was to win the 1996 European Amateur in August on home turf at Karlstad Golf Club, in a field that included future European Tour winners Søren Hansen, Peter Lawrie, Henrik Stenson and defending European champion Sergio García. It was the ninth installation of the tournament and Olsson was the third Swede to win the event, after Anders Haglund at the inaugural tournament in 1986 and Klas Eriksson in 1990.

The win earned Olsson an invitation to the 125th Open Championship at Royal Troon Golf Club in 1997. He did not make the cut. However he shot a hole in one at the 5th hole in his second round and as of 2020 still held the PGA Tour record as the most recent amateur to score a hole in one in a major championship on European soil. The British press noted that, curiously, his fellow countrymen Dennis Edlund and Pierre Fulke also made hole in ones in the same tournament.

Olsson turned professional in 1998 and played on the Swedish Golf Tour 1998–2001, but never reached a European Tour card. After retiring from tournament golf, he became head green-keeper at his home club, Kristianstad Golf Club.

== Amateur wins ==
- 1996 European Amateur

== Professional wins (1) ==
=== Swedish Golf Tour wins (1) ===
No.	Date	Tournament	Winning score	Margin of victory	Runner-up
1	18 May 1996	Motoman Robotics Open (as an amateur)	−1 (71-71-73=215)	Playoff	(Sweden) Johan Sköld

== Team appearances ==
Amateur

- European Boys' Team Championship (representing Sweden): 1993 (winners)
- European Youths' Team Championship (representing Sweden): 1996
- European Amateur Team Championship (representing Sweden): 1995, 1997
- Eisenhower Trophy (representing Sweden): 1996
- St Andrews Trophy (representing the Continent of Europe): 1996
