= St Andrews Trophy =

Biennial men's golf team tournament

The St Andrews Trophy is a biennial men's team golf tournament contested between teams of amateur golfers representing Great Britain & Ireland and the Continent of Europe. It takes its name from St Andrews in Scotland.

It was first played in 1956 and takes place in even-numbered years; Great Britain & Ireland plays in the United States in the Walker Cup in odd-numbered years. In 2025 the St Andrews Trophy will move to odd-numbered years and the Walker Cup will be played from even-numbered years from 2026. The St Andrews Trophy is staged alternately in Great Britain & Ireland and on the Continent, and is organised by The R&A (an offshoot of The Royal and Ancient Golf Club of St Andrews) and the European Golf Association. The St Andrews Trophy itself was presented by the Royal and Ancient Club in 1963.

The event is played on two consecutive days. On both days there are four morning foursomes followed by afternoon singles, eight on the first day and nine on the second.

== History ==
The first event was held at Wentworth on 20 and 21 October 1956 and followed a similar format to that used for the Joy Cup which featured professional golfers. The teams were called the British Isles and the Rest of Europe. There were five foursomes on the first day and ten singles on the second. All matches were over 36 holes. The British Isles used the same ten players on both days, while the Rest of Europe used a total of twelve players. The British Isles won all five matches on the first day and finished 12½–2½ winners.

The second event was held at Golf de Saint-Cloud in France on 2 and 3 October 1958, retaining the same format as in 1956. Britain used 11 players while the Rest of Europe used 12 as they had in 1956. The British Isles won four of the five foursomes on the first day and, although the Rest of Europe won four singles, Britain won comfortably, 10–5. In 1960 it was held at the Berkshire Golf Club on 3 and 4 September. With 12 players from the Rest of Europe attending, it was decided to extend the format to include six foursomes and twelve singles, all 12 in each team playing both days. Britain won the foursomes 5–1 and the singles 8–4 to win convincingly.

The 1962 event was held at Halmstad GK in Tylösand, Sweden on 11 and 12 August. Matches were reduced to 18 holes with five foursomes and ten singles on each day. Teams were standardised to 11 players. Great Britain and Ireland won the foursomes sessions 4½–½ and 4–1 and, although the Continent of Europe tied the first-day singles and won the second set of singles 5½–4½, Great Britain and Ireland won 18–12 thanks to their domination of the foursomes. The next tournament was held on 31 July and 1 August 1964 at Muirfield and was the first time the St Andrews trophy was contested. Great Britain and Ireland led 12–3 and won by a large margin, 23–7. The 1966 event was held at Real Sociedad de Golf de Neguri near Bilbao, Spain on 29 and 30 July. Although Great Britain and Ireland won the first-day foursomes 4–1, the singles and the second-day foursomes were both tied. The Continent of Europe could have won the match with a good final session but they lost the first seven singles matches and the final result was 19½–10½.

Portmarnock Golf Club in Ireland was the host for the 1968 match, held on 2 and 3 August. The match was very one-sided with Great Britain and Ireland leading 12½–2½ after the first day and winning 20–10, despite losing the final singles 6–4. The 1970 event was held at Royal Zoute Golf Club, Belgium on 1 and 2 August. Great Britain and Ireland won all five foursomes on the first morning but after the Continent had won the singles and the second-day foursomes, Britain only led 10½–9½. The Continent were however only able to win three second-day singles and Britain won 17½–12½. The Berkshire was the venue for the 1972 match, played on 4 and 5 August. The Continent won the first set of foursomes 3–2 but Britain won the singles 8½–1½ and the second-day foursomes 4–1 to take a convincing lead. The second set of singles was tied to give Great Britain and Ireland a 19½–10½ win, their ninth successive victory.

The Continent of Europe had their first success on 2 and 3 August 1974 at Golf Club Punta Ala on the Tuscan coast in Italy. On the first day the foursomes were tied but the Continent won the singles and led 8–7, the first time they had been ahead after the first day. On the second day the Continent won the foursomes 3–2 and with 5 wins in the singles they took the trophy by a 16–14 margin. The Old Course at St Andrews hosted the 1976 match, played on 30 and 31 July. Although the Continent lost 18½–11½, it was their best performance on British soil. The 1978 event was held on 4 and 5 August at Club zur Vahr in Bremen, Germany. Britain won comfortably by a margin of 20½–9½. Royal St George's Golf Club hosted the 1980 match, played on 27 and 28 June. Great Britain and Ireland led 12–3 after the first day and had ensured success after leading 16–4 after the second-day foursomes. The Continent won the second-day singles session, Britain winning by a score of 19½–10½.

The format was revised in 1982 with only four foursomes and eight singles on each day. Teams were reduced from 11 to 9. The Continent of Europe gained their second success. The match was played at Rosendaelsche Golfclub, Arnhem in the Netherlands on 25 and 26 June. The Continent led 8–4 after the first day. On the second day they halved both the sessions and won 14–10. The 1984 match, played on 30 and 31 May at Saunton Golf Club, was the first time the Continent came close to winning in Britain. Great Britain and Ireland led 6½–5½ after the first day and 8½–7½ after the second-day foursomes. In the afternoon five of the eight singles went to the final green with Britain winning two of these and halving the other three, giving Britain a close 13–11 win. Halmstad hosted the event for the second time on 27 and 28 June 1986. The Continent had an immediate disadvantage when Anders Haglund, who had the inaugural European Amateur earlier in the year, had to withdraw because of illness. This meant that the same eight players had to play in each session. Britain won the first-day singles 7–1 to lead 9–3. The Continent won the second-day foursomes but Britain again won the singles for a 14½–9½ win.

The 1988 match was held at St Andrews on 29 and 30 June. Great Britain and Ireland led 7½–4½ after the first day and won easily, 15½–8½.

The 2020 match was cancelled due to the COVID-19 pandemic in the United Kingdom.

== Results ==
Year	Venue	Winning team Captain	Score		Losing team Captain
2025	Real Club de la Puerta de Hierro, Spain	Great Britain (United Kingdom) & Ireland (Republic of Ireland); Dean Robertson	16½	8½	Continent of Europe; Carlos de Corral
2024	Royal Porthcawl Golf Club, Wales	Continent of Europe; Carlos de Corral	16	9	Great Britain (United Kingdom) & Ireland (Republic of Ireland); Dean Robertson
2022	Penati Golf Resort, Slovakia	Great Britain (United Kingdom) & Ireland (Republic of Ireland); Stuart Wilson	14½	10½	Continent of Europe; Yves Hofstetter
2020	Royal Porthcawl Golf Club, Wales	Cancelled			
2018	Linna Golf, Finland	Continent of Europe; Yves Hofstetter	15½	9½	Great Britain (United Kingdom) & Ireland (Republic of Ireland); Craig Watson
2016	Prince's Golf Club, England	Great Britain (United Kingdom) & Ireland (Republic of Ireland); Craig Watson	12½	12½	Continent of Europe; Yves Hofstetter
2014	Barsebäck Golf & Country Club, Sweden	Great Britain (United Kingdom) & Ireland (Republic of Ireland); Nigel Edwards	14	10	Continent of Europe; Alexis Godillot
2012	Portmarnock Golf Club, Ireland	Continent of Europe; Alexis Godillot	12½	11½	Great Britain (United Kingdom) & Ireland (Republic of Ireland); Nigel Edwards
2010	Golf Club Castelconturbia, Italy	Continent of Europe; Alexis Godillot	14	10	Great Britain (United Kingdom) & Ireland (Republic of Ireland); Nigel Edwards
2008	Kingsbarns Golf Links, Scotland	Great Britain (United Kingdom) & Ireland (Republic of Ireland); Colin Dalgleish	13½	10½	Continent of Europe; Alexis Godillot
2006	Royal Golf Club Mariánské Lázne, Czech Republic	Great Britain (United Kingdom) & Ireland (Republic of Ireland); Colin Dalgleish	15	9	Continent of Europe; Wolfgang Wiegand
2004	Nairn Golf Club, Scotland	Great Britain (United Kingdom) & Ireland (Republic of Ireland); Garth McGimpsey	17	7	Continent of Europe; Wolfgang Wiegand
2002	Golf Club de Lausanne, Switzerland	Great Britain (United Kingdom) & Ireland (Republic of Ireland); Garth McGimpsey	14	10	Continent of Europe; Wolfgang Wiegand
2000	Ailsa Course, Turnberry, Scotland	Great Britain (United Kingdom) & Ireland (Republic of Ireland); Peter McEvoy	13	11	Continent of Europe; Gonzaga Escauriaza
1998	Golf Villa D'Este, Italy	Continent of Europe; Gonzaga Escauriaza	14	10	Great Britain (United Kingdom) & Ireland (Republic of Ireland); Peter McEvoy
1996	Woodhall Spa Golf Club, England	Great Britain (United Kingdom) & Ireland (Republic of Ireland); Clive Brown	16	8	Continent of Europe; Piero Cora
1994	Golf de Chantilly, France	Great Britain (United Kingdom) & Ireland (Republic of Ireland); George Macgregor	14	10	Continent of Europe; Santiago Fisas
1992	Royal Cinque Ports Golf Club, England	Great Britain (United Kingdom) & Ireland (Republic of Ireland); George Macgregor	14	10	Continent of Europe; Santiago Fisas
1990	Campo de Golf Parador El Saler, Spain	Great Britain (United Kingdom) & Ireland (Republic of Ireland)	13	11	Continent of Europe
1988	Old Course at St Andrews, Scotland	Great Britain (United Kingdom) & Ireland (Republic of Ireland)	15½	8½	Continent of Europe
1986	Halmstad Golfklubb, Sweden	Great Britain (United Kingdom) & Ireland (Republic of Ireland)	14½	9½	Continent of Europe
1984	Saunton Golf Club, England	Great Britain (United Kingdom) & Ireland (Republic of Ireland)	13	11	Continent of Europe
1982	Rosendaelsche Golfclub, Netherlands	Continent of Europe	14	10	Great Britain (United Kingdom) & Ireland (Republic of Ireland)
1980	Royal St George's Golf Club, England	Great Britain (United Kingdom) & Ireland (Republic of Ireland)	19½	10½	Continent of Europe
1978	Club zur Vahr, West Germany	Great Britain (United Kingdom) & Ireland (Republic of Ireland)	20½	9½	Continent of Europe
1976	Old Course at St Andrews, Scotland	Great Britain (United Kingdom) & Ireland (Republic of Ireland)	18½	11½	Continent of Europe
1974	Golf Club Punta Ala, Italy	Continent of Europe	16	14	Great Britain (United Kingdom) & Ireland (Republic of Ireland)
1972	The Berkshire Golf Club, England	Great Britain (United Kingdom) & Ireland (Republic of Ireland)	19½	10½	Continent of Europe
1970	Royal Zoute Golf Club, Belgium	Great Britain (United Kingdom) & Ireland (Republic of Ireland)	17½	12½	Continent of Europe
1968	Portmarnock Golf Club, Ireland	Great Britain (United Kingdom) & Ireland (Republic of Ireland)	20	10	Continent of Europe
1966	Real Sociedad de Golf de Neguri, Spain	Great Britain (United Kingdom) & Ireland (Republic of Ireland)	19½	10½	Continent of Europe
1964	Muirfield, Scotland	Great Britain (United Kingdom) & Ireland (Republic of Ireland)	23	7	Continent of Europe
1962	Halmstad Golfklubb, Sweden	Great Britain (United Kingdom) & Ireland (Republic of Ireland)	18	12	Continent of Europe
1960	The Berkshire Golf Club, England	Great Britain (United Kingdom) & Ireland (Republic of Ireland)	13	5	Continent of Europe
1958	Golf de Saint-Cloud, France	Great Britain (United Kingdom) & Ireland (Republic of Ireland)	10	5	Continent of Europe
1956	Wentworth, England	Great Britain (United Kingdom) & Ireland (Republic of Ireland); Gerald Micklem	12½	2½	Continent of Europe; Jacques Léglise

== Future venues ==
- 2027 - TBA

== Appearances ==
The following are those who have played in at least one of the matches.

=== Great Britain and Ireland ===
- (Republic of Ireland) Neil Anderson 1988
- (England) Harry Ashby 1974
- (Wales) James Ashfield 2024
- (England) Michael Attenborough 1966, 1968
- (England) Sam Bairstow 2022
- (England) Peter Baker 1986
- (Scotland) Roger Beames 1996
- (England) John Beharrell 1956
- (England) Peter Benke 1970
- (England) Warren Bennett 1994
- (England) Peter Berry 1972
- (England) Jack Bigham 2024
- (Scotland) Findlay Black 1966
- (England) Warren Bladon 1996
- (England) Michael Bonallack 1958, 1960, 1962, 1964, 1966, 1968, 1970, 1972
- (Wales) David Boote 2016
- (Scotland) Wallace Booth 2008
- (England) Jamie Bower 2016
- (Scotland) Gordon Brand Jnr 1976, 1978, 1980
- (England) Paul Broadhurst 1988
- (Scotland) Allan Brodie 1974, 1976, 1978, 1980
- (England) Colin Brooks 1986
- (Scotland) Michael Brooks 1996
- (England) Sam Brough 1960
- (England) Barclay Brown 2022
- (Republic of Ireland) Raymond Burns 1992
- (Scotland) Alan Bussell 1956, 1962
- (Scotland) James Byrne 2010
- (England) Ian Caldwell 1956, 1960
- (Republic of Ireland) Jonathan Caldwell 2008
- (Scotland) Hugh Campbell 1964
- (England) Laurie Canter 2010
- (Scotland) David Carrick 1986
- (Republic of Ireland) Joe Carr 1956, 1968
- (Scotland) Iain Carslaw 1978
- (Republic of Ireland) Jim Carvill 1990
- (England) Paul Casey 2000
- (England) Craig Cassells 1990
- (England) Seb Cave 2024
- (England) Brian Chapman 1962
- (England) Roger Chapman 1980
- (England) Ashley Chesters 2014
- (England) Martin Christmas 1960, 1962, 1964
- (Republic of Ireland) Darren Clarke 1990
- (England) Clive Clark 1964
- (England) Gordon Clark 1964, 1966
- (England) Graeme Clark 2002
- (England) Todd Clements 2018
- (England) Dominic Clemons 2024
- (Scotland) Andrew Coltart 1990
- (England) Lee Corfield 2004
- (Republic of Ireland) Tom Corridan 1984
- (Scotland) Gordon Cosh 1966, 1968
- (Republic of Ireland) Tom Craddock 1958, 1966, 1968
- (England) Bruce Critchley 1970
- (England) David Curry 1986, 1988
- (Republic of Ireland) Paul Cutler 2010
- (Scotland) Colin Dalgleish 1982
- (Wales) Archie Davies 2022
- (England) John Davies 1972, 1974, 1976, 1978
- (Wales) Rhys Davies 2006
- (Republic of Ireland) Robin Dawson 2018
- (England) Peter Deeble 1978
- (England) Robert Dinwiddie 2006
- (England) Luke Donald 1998, 2000
- (Wales) Jamie Donaldson 2000
- (England) Nick Dougherty 2000
- (England) Paul Downes 1980
- (Wales) Bradley Dredge 1994
- (Republic of Ireland) Alan Dunbar 2012
- (Wales) George Duncan 1956
- (Republic of Ireland) Paul Dunne 2014
- (England) Simon Dyson 1998
- (Wales) Nigel Edwards 2002, 2004, 2006
- (England) Arron Edwards-Hill 2022
- (England) Bobby Eggo 1988
- (Wales) Matthew Ellis 1996
- (England) Jamie Elson 2002
- (Wales) Duncan Evans 1980
- (England) Ryan Evans 2014
- (England) Richard Eyles 1974
- (Republic of Ireland) Jody Fanagan 1992, 1996
- (England) David Fisher 1994
- (England) Oliver Fisher 2006
- (Scotland) Grant Forrest 2014, 2016
- (England) Charlie Forster 2024
- (England) Rodney Foster 1964, 1966, 1968, 1970
- (Republic of Ireland) Noel Fox 2000
- (England) David Frame 1958, 1960
- (Republic of Ireland) Mark Gannon 1974, 1978
- (England) Ian Garbutt 1992
- (England) David Gilford 1986
- (Scotland) Graham Gordon 2002
- (England) John Gough 2022
- (Scotland) Connor Graham 2024
- (Scotland) Gregor Graham 2024
- (Scotland) Charlie Green 1962, 1966, 1968, 1970, 1972, 1974, 1976
- (England) Scott Gregory 2016
- (Republic of Ireland) Stuart Grehan 2016
- (England) David Hague 2018
- (England) Matt Haines 2008
- (Republic of Ireland) Pádraig Harrington 1992, 1994
- (England) Max Harris 2000
- (England) John Hawksworth 1984
- (Scotland) Garry Hay 1980
- (England) James Heath 2004
- (England) Peter Hedges 1974, 1976
- (England) Craig Hinton 2012
- (England) Trevor Homer 1972
- (Scotland) Barclay Howard 1980, 1994, 1996
- (England) Gordon Huddy 1960
- (Republic of Ireland) Jack Hume 2016
- (England) Warren Humphreys 1970
- (Republic of Ireland) Gary Hurley 2014
- (Scotland) Ian Hutcheon 1974, 1976
- (England) Sam Hutsby 2008
- (Scotland) Reid Jack 1956
- (England) Lee S. James 1994
- (Wales) Richard Johnson 1994
- (England) Matthew Jordan 2018
- (Republic of Ireland) Raymond Kane 1974
- (Scotland) Ross Kellett 2010
- (England) Michael Kelley 1976, 1978, 1982
- (Scotland) Lorne Kelly 1998
- (Republic of Ireland) Max Kennedy 2024
- (England) Stephen Keppler 1982
- (England) Nathan Kimsey 2012
- (England) Michael King 1970, 1972
- (England) Craig Laurence 1984
- (England) Tom Lewis 2010
- (Scotland) Mark Loftus 2000
- (Republic of Ireland) Shane Lowry 2008
- (England) Michael Lunt 1958, 1960, 1964
- (England) Jon Lupton 2002
- (Scotland) Sandy Lyle 1976
- (Scotland) Callum Macaulay 2008
- (Scotland) Scott Macdonald 1970
- (Scotland) George Macgregor 1970, 1974, 1984
- (Scotland) Keith Macintosh 1980
- (Scotland) Robert MacIntyre 2016
- (Scotland) Simon Mackenzie 2002
- (Republic of Ireland) David Madeley 1962
- (Scotland) Brian Marchbank 1976, 1978
- (England) Geoff Marks 1968, 1970
- (England) David Marsh 1958
- (England) Nick Marsh 2014
- (Scotland) Steve Martin 1976
- (Wales) Paul Mayo 1986
- (Scotland) Andrew McArthur 2004
- (Republic of Ireland) Matthew McClean 2022
- (England) Peter McEvoy 1978, 1980, 1984, 1986, 1988
- (Republic of Ireland) Garth McGimpsey 1984, 1986, 1988, 1990, 1992
- (England) Ross McGowan 2006
- (Republic of Ireland) Rory McIlroy 2006
- (Scotland) Paul McKellar 1978
- (Scotland) Jamie McLeary 2004
- (England) John Metcalfe 1990
- (Scotland) Jim Milligan 1988, 1990, 1992
- (Scotland) Angus Moir 1984
- (Scotland) Colin Montgomerie 1986
- (England) Peter Moody 1972
- (Republic of Ireland) Robert Moran 2022
- (England) Jamie Moul 2006
- (Republic of Ireland) Pat Mulcare 1972
- (Republic of Ireland) John Murphy 2018
- (Scotland) Gordon Murray 1978
- (Scotland) Stuart Murray 1958, 1962
- (Scotland) Bradley Neil 2014
- (England) Matthew Nixon 2010
- (Republic of Ireland) Keith Nolan 1996
- (Republic of Ireland) Eoghan O'Connell 1988
- (Scotland) Steven O'Hara 2000
- (England) Andrew Oldcorn 1982
- (Republic of Ireland) Bryan Omelia 1998
- (England) Peter Oosterhuis 1968
- (England) Sam Osborne 2004
- (England) Chris Paisley 2008
- (Wales) Philip Parkin 1984
- (Scotland) David Patrick 1998
- (England) Jim Payne 1990
- (England) Eddie Pepperell 2010
- (England) Gian-Marco Petrozzi 2018
- (Republic of Ireland) Kevin Phelan 2012
- (Republic of Ireland) Arthur Pierse 1980, 1982
- (Scotland) Sandy Pirie 1970
- (England) Alfie Plant 2016
- (England) Nick Poppleton 2018
- (England) Garrick Porteous 2012
- (Wales) John Povall 1962
- (Republic of Ireland) Mark Power 2022
- (Wales) Rhys Pugh 2012
- (Republic of Ireland) Conor Purcell 2018
- (Republic of Ireland) Caolan Rafferty 2024
- (Republic of Ireland) Ronan Rafferty 1980
- (Scotland) Richie Ramsay 2006
- (Scotland) Graham Rankin 1998
- (England) Neil Raymond 2012
- (England) Matthew Richardson 2004
- (Scotland) Dean Robertson 1992
- (Scotland) Graeme Robertson 2012, 2014
- (Wales) Neil Roderick 1988
- (Scotland) Sandy Saddler 1960, 1962, 1964, 1966
- (Scotland) Lloyd Saltman 2006
- (Scotland) Jamie Savage 2014
- (England) Zane Scotland 2002
- (Scotland) Calum Scott 2022
- (England) Doug Sewell 1958, 1960
- (Scotland) Ronnie Shade 1962, 1964, 1966, 1968
- (Republic of Ireland) David Sheahan 1962, 1964
- (England) Alec Shepperson 1956, 1958, 1960
- (England) Andrew Sherborne 1984
- (Scotland) Gordon Sherry 1994
- (Republic of Ireland) Martin Sludds 1982
- (England) Billy Smith 1972
- (Scotland) Dickson Smith 1958
- (Republic of Ireland) Hugh Smyth 1976
- (England) Matt Stanford 1992
- (Scotland) Sandy Stephen 1972
- (Scotland) Michael Stewart 2010
- (Scotland) Hugh Stuart 1968, 1972, 1974
- (Scotland) Connor Syme 2016
- (England) Keith Tate 1956
- (England) Ben Taylor 2012
- (England) Alan Thirlwell 1956, 1958, 1964
- (England) Martin Thompson 1982
- (England) Peter Townsend 1966
- (England) Steven Uzzell 2008
- (England) Mitch Waite 2018
- (Scotland) James Walker 1958, 1960
- (England) Richard Walker 2002
- (Republic of Ireland) Philip Walton 1982
- (Scotland) Craig Watson 1998
- (England) Dale Whitnell 2008
- (England) Robert Wiggins 1996
- (Wales) Craig Williams 1998
- (England) Ricky Willison 1990
- (Scotland) Stuart Wilson 2004
- (England) Gary Wolstenholme 1992, 1994, 1996, 1998, 2000, 2002, 2004
- (England) Guy Wolstenholme 1956
- (England) Darren Wright 2010
- (Scotland) Ian Young 1982
- (Scotland) John Young 1960

=== Continent of Europe ===
- (Spain) José Luis Adarraga 2006
- (Finland) Antti Ahokas 2006
- (Sweden) Björn Åkesson 2008
- (Germany) Anton Albers 2022
- (France) Bastian Amat 2024
- (Sweden) Fredrik Andersson 1992
- (Sweden) J Andersson 1960
- (Spain) Alvaro Arana 1966
- (Norway) Christian Aronsen 1998
- (Denmark) Morten Backhausen 1994
- (France) Marius Bardana 1956, 1958, 1960
- (Switzerland) Olivier Barras 1956, 1958, 1960
- (France) Léonard Bem 2014
- (Spain) Daniel Berna 2014
- (Italy) Nadi Berruti 1958, 1960
- (Italy) Nino Bertasio 2010
- (France) Thomas Besancenez 2000
- (Netherlands) Wil Besseling 2006
- (Italy) Stefano Betti 1976
- (Italy) Franco Bevione 1958
- (Sweden) Gustaf Adolf Bielke 1956, 1962
- (Italy) Alberto Binaghi 1984
- (Denmark) Thomas Bjørn 1990
- (Italy) Pietro Bovari 2022
- (Iceland) Heidar Bragason 2004
- (Sweden) Kalle Brink 1994
- (Italy) Andrea Brotto 1996
- (Germany) Walter Brühne 1966, 1968
- (Spain) Jorge Campillo 2008
- (Italy) Andrea Canessa 1980, 1982, 1984
- (Spain) Iván Cantero 2016
- (Sweden) Gunnar Carlander 1962
- (Portugal) Joao Carlota 2014
- (France) Edgar Catherine 2018
- (France) Didier Charmat 1970
- (Italy) Luca Cianchetti 2016
- (Switzerland) Julien Clément 2002
- (France) Patrick Cotton 1974
- (France) Martin Couvra 2022
- (Italy) Alberto Croce 1964, 1966
- (France) Patrick Cros 1962, 1964, 1966
- (Italy) Alberto Croze 1974, 1976
- (Spain) Emilio Cuartero 2014
- (Portugal) Daniel da Costa Rodrigues 2022
- (Italy) Baldovino Dassù 1970
- (France) Olivier David 1998
- (Portugal) Nuno de Brito e Cunha 1968, 1972
- (France) Henri de Lamaze 1956, 1958, 1960
- (Spain) Eduardo de la Riva, Snr 1972, 1976, 1980, 1990
- (Italy) Matteo Delpodio 2006
- (Portugal) José de Sousa e Mello 1972
- (Norway) Erik Donnerstad 1972
- (France) Diego Dupin 1994
- (Italy) Marco Durante 1980
- (Finland) Albert Eckhardt 2014
- (France) Olivier Edmond 1990
- (Switzerland) Mathias Eggenberger 2014
- (Spain) Pablo Ereño Pérez 2024
- (Sweden) Klas Eriksson 1990
- (Sweden) Martin Erlandsson 1996
- (France) Édouard España 2012
- (Sweden) Niclas Fasth 1992
- (Spain) Gonzalo Fernández-Castaño 2004
- (Switzerland) Markus Frank 1982
- (France) Hervé Frayssineau 1966
- (Italy) Lorenzo Gagli 2006
- (Spain) Mario Galiano Aguilar 2014, 2016
- (Spain) José Gancedo 1968, 1970, 1972, 1974
- (Spain) Jordi García del Moral 2006
- (Spain) Alfredo García-Heredia 2002, 2004
- (Spain) Sergio García 1996
- (Spain) Ignacio Garrido 1992
- (Spain) Ignacio Gervás 1984
- (Spain) Ivó Giner 1996
- (France) Alexis Godillot 1964, 1966, 1968, 1970, 1972, 1974, 1976, 1978, 1980, 1982
- (Slovenia) Tim Gornik 2014
- (Switzerland) Thomas Gottstein 1988
- (France) Julien Grillon 2006
- (Germany) Stephan Gross 2008
- (France) Julien Guerrier 2006
- (Denmark) Mark Haastrup 2004
- (Sweden) Anders Haglund 1986^, 1988
- (Germany) Marc Hammer 2018
- (Sweden) Chris Hanell 1994
- (Denmark) Herluf Hansen 1962
- (Sweden) Peter Hanson 1998
- (Sweden) Cristian Härdin 1986, 1988
- (France) Benjamin Hébert 2008
- (Sweden) Hans Hedjerson 1968, 1970, 1976
- (Spain) Ángel Hidalgo 2018
- (Sweden) Gabriel Hjertstedt 1990
- (Switzerland) Yves Hofstetter 1974, 1976
- (Sweden) Mikael Högberg 1984
- (Finland) Matias Honkala 2018
- (France) François Illouz 1980, 1982, 1988
- (Finland) Mikko Ilonen 2000
- (Czech Republic) Filip Jakubčík 2024
- (Netherlands) Jerry Ji 2024
- (Germany) Peter Jochums 1966, 1970
- (Sweden) Per-Olof Johansson 1962, 1964
- (Sweden) Claës Jöhncke 1962, 1966, 1968, 1970, 1972, 1974
- (Iceland) Úlfar Jónsson 1990
- (France) Alexandre Kaleka 2008
- (Sweden) Rune Karlfeldt 1964
- (Sweden) Robert S. Karlsson 2012
- (Germany) Martin Kaymer 2004
- (Sweden) Jesper Kennegård 2008, 2010
- (Germany) Maximilian Kieffer 2010
- (Sweden) Krister Kinell 1982
- (Denmark) Jesper Kjaerbye 1994
- (Norway) Espen Kofstad 2010
- (Netherlands) Jeroen Krietemeijer 2016
- (Finland) Panu Kylliäinen 1998, 2000
- (France) Frédéric Lacroix 2018
- (Netherlands) Maarten Lafeber 1996
- (France) Roger Lagarde 1958, 1972
- (Germany) Hans Lampert 1958, 1960
- (Germany) Moritz Lampert 2012
- (Spain) José Manuel Lara 1996
- (Spain) Alejandro Larrazábal 2002
- (Finland) Mika Lehtinen 1996
- (Sweden) Lennart Leinborn 1962
- (Sweden) Niklas Lemke 2002
- (France) José-Filipe Lima 2002
- (Sweden) John Lindberg 1986, 1988
- (Sweden) Fredrik Lindgren 1984, 1988
- (Italy) Antonio Lionello 1974, 1978
- (France) Johann Lopez-Lazaro 2010
- (Sweden) David Lundgren 2022
- (Sweden) Göran Lundqvist 1976, 1978
- (Germany) Jochen Lupprian 2000
- (Denmark) Morten Ørum Madsen 2010
- (Italy) Stefano Maio 1998
- (Spain) Luis Masaveu 2022, 2024
- (Spain) Iván Maura 1956, 1958, 1966
- (Italy) Stefano Mazzoli 2016, 2018
- (Italy) Guido Migliozzi 2016
- (Belgium) Jacky Moerman 1956, 1958, 1960, 1970
- (Italy) Edoardo Molinari 2004
- (Italy) Francesco Molinari 2004
- (France) Gaëtan Mourgue d'Algue 1962, 1964, 1966, 1968
- (Netherlands) Rolf Muntz 1990, 1992
- (Germany) Peter Möller 1962
- (Germany) Jan-Gerhard Müller 1974, 1976
- (Austria) Klaus Nierlich 1970, 1974
- (Sweden) Fredrik Niléhn 2018
- (Italy) Enrico Nistri 1990
- (Netherlands) Bart Nolte 1986
- (Spain) José María Olazábal 1984
- (Denmark) Jacob Skov Olesen 2024
- (Sweden) Daniel Olsson 1996
- (Austria) Thomas Ortner 2004
- (Germany) Veit Pagel 1972, 1976, 1978, 1980
- (Sweden) Jesper Parnevik 1986
- (Spain) Jacobo Pastor 2012
- (Italy) Andrea Pavan 2008
- (Sweden) Magnus Persson 1982
- (Sweden) Robin Petersson 2016
- (Spain) Carlos Pigem 2012
- (France) Tim Planchin 1976, 1978, 1980
- (France) Philippe Ploujoux 1982
- (Finland) Tapio Pulkkanen 2012
- (Spain) Borja Queipo de Llano 1988, 1990
- (Spain) Raúl Quirós 1998
- (Denmark) Jacob Rasmussen 1980, 1984
- (France) Christophe Ravetto 1996, 1998
- (Italy) Stefano Reale 2000
- (Italy) Franco Revione 1956
- (Spain) Luis Rezola 1956
- (Belgium) Freddy Rodesch 1960, 1962, 1964, 1966, 1968
- (Belgium) Paul Rolin 1956, 1964
- (Sweden) Jan Rube 1976, 1978, 1980
- (Sweden) Johan Ryström 1986
- (Spain) Nicasio Sagardia 1978
- (Finland) Kalle Samooja 2010
- (Spain) Francisco Sanchiz 1964
- (Portugal) Hugo Santos 2002
- (Portugal) Ricardo Santos 2004
- (Netherlands) Reinier Saxton 2008
- (Italy) Lorenzo Scalise 2018
- (Italy) Massimo Scarpa 1992
- (Germany) Jan-Erik Schapmann 1992
- (Italy) Alberto Schiaffino 1958, 1964, 1968
- (Germany) Laurenz Schiergen 2022
- (Germany) Frank Schlig 1984
- (Germany) Marcel Schneider 2012
- (Germany) Ulrich Schulte 1982
- (Germany) Tino Schuster 2000
- (Austria) Matthias Schwab 2016
- (Germany) Erik Sellschopp 1956, 1960, 1962
- (Portugal) Daniel Silva 1986, 1988
- (Italy) Lorenzo Silva 1964, 1966
- (Finland) Timo Sipponen 1980
- (Netherlands) Tim Sluiter 2008
- (Denmark) Anders Sørensen 1982
- (Denmark) Thomas Sørensen 2012
- (Sweden) Mikael Sorling 1978
- (Austria) Maximilian Steinlechner 2022
- (Sweden) Henrik Stenson 1998
- (Germany) Christian Strenger 1974, 1978
- (Germany) Sven Strüver 1988
- (Switzerland) Nicolas Sulzer 2002
- (Finland) Thomas Sundström 2002
- (Sweden) Björn Svedin 1980
- (Norway) Tore Sviland 1984
- (Netherlands) Victor Swane 1972
- (Belgium) Eric Tavernier 1958, 1960
- (Spain) Roman Taya 1970, 1972, 1974, 1978
- (Estonia) Richard Teder 2024
- (France) Jacques Thalamy 2000
- (Germany) Michael Thannhäuser 1998, 2000
- (Denmark) Niels Thygesen 1956, 1958
- (Belgium) Philippe Toussaint 1968, 1970
- (Austria) Manuel Trappel 2012
- (Switzerland) Damian Ulrich 2006
- (Spain) Francisco Valera 1992, 1994
- (Finland) Erkki Välimaa 1986
- (Finland) Sami Välimäki 2018
- (Netherlands) Darius van Driel 2014
- (France) Jean van de Velde 1986
- (Netherlands) Lars van der Vight 2024
- (Belgium) Nicolas Vanhootegem 1992, 1994
- (Spain) Rafael Vera 2000
- (France) Victor Veyret 2016
- (Sweden) Adam Wallin 2022
- (Belgium) Philippe Washer 1960
- (France) Romain Wattel 2010
- (Germany) Jürgen Weghmann 1968
- (Sweden) Elis Werkell 1956, 1960
- (Sweden) Leif Westerberg 1994
- (Sweden) Pontus Widegren 2010
- (Germany) Tim Wiedemeyer 2024
- (Austria) Martin Wiegele 2002
- (Italy) Manny Zerman 1992
- (Austria) Niki Zitny 1994

== See also ==
- Vagliano Trophy – the equivalent event for women (since 1959)
- Jacques Léglise Trophy – the equivalent event for boys (since 1958)
- Seve Trophy – the equivalent event for professionals (2000–2013)
