= Motoman Robotics Open =

Tournament information
- Location: Ödåkra, Sweden
- Established: 1996
- Course: Möre Golf Cub
- Par: 72
- Tours: Nordic Golf League; Swedish Golf Tour
- Format: Stroke play
- Prize fund: kr 100,000
- Final year: 1999

Tournament record score
- Aggregate: 205 Fredrik Widmark (1997)
- To par: −11 as above

Final champion
- (Sweden) Peter Malmgren

Location map
- Location in Sweden

The Motoman Robotics Open was a golf tournament on the Swedish Golf Tour held from 1996 to 1999. It was played at Möre Golf Cub in Ödåkra 35km south of Kalmar, Sweden.

== History ==
The tournament was played in May served as the season opener for the Swedish Golf Tour in 1996 and 1997.

Amateur Daniel Olsson won the inaugural tournament following a playoff with Johan Sköld, a few months before winning the European Amateur.

== Winners ==
Year	Tour (Note: NGL − Nordic Golf League; SWE − Swedish Golf Tour.)	Winner	Score	To par	Margin of victory	Runner(s)-up	Purse	Ref.
Möre Hotell Open
1999	NGL	(Sweden) Peter Malmgren	209	−7	3 strokes	(Sweden) Björn Pettersson	100,000	
AP Parts Motoman Open
1998	SWE	(Sweden) Fredrik Widmark	205	−11	2 strokes	(Sweden) Jonas Karlsson	150,000	
Motoman Robotics Open
1997	SWE	(Sweden) Johan Ryström	213	−3	3 strokes	(Sweden) Johan Lundquist	150,000	
1996	SWE	(Sweden) Daniel Olsson (a)	215	−1	Playoff	(Sweden) Johan Sköld	100,000	
