= José Manuel Lara =

Spanish professional golfer

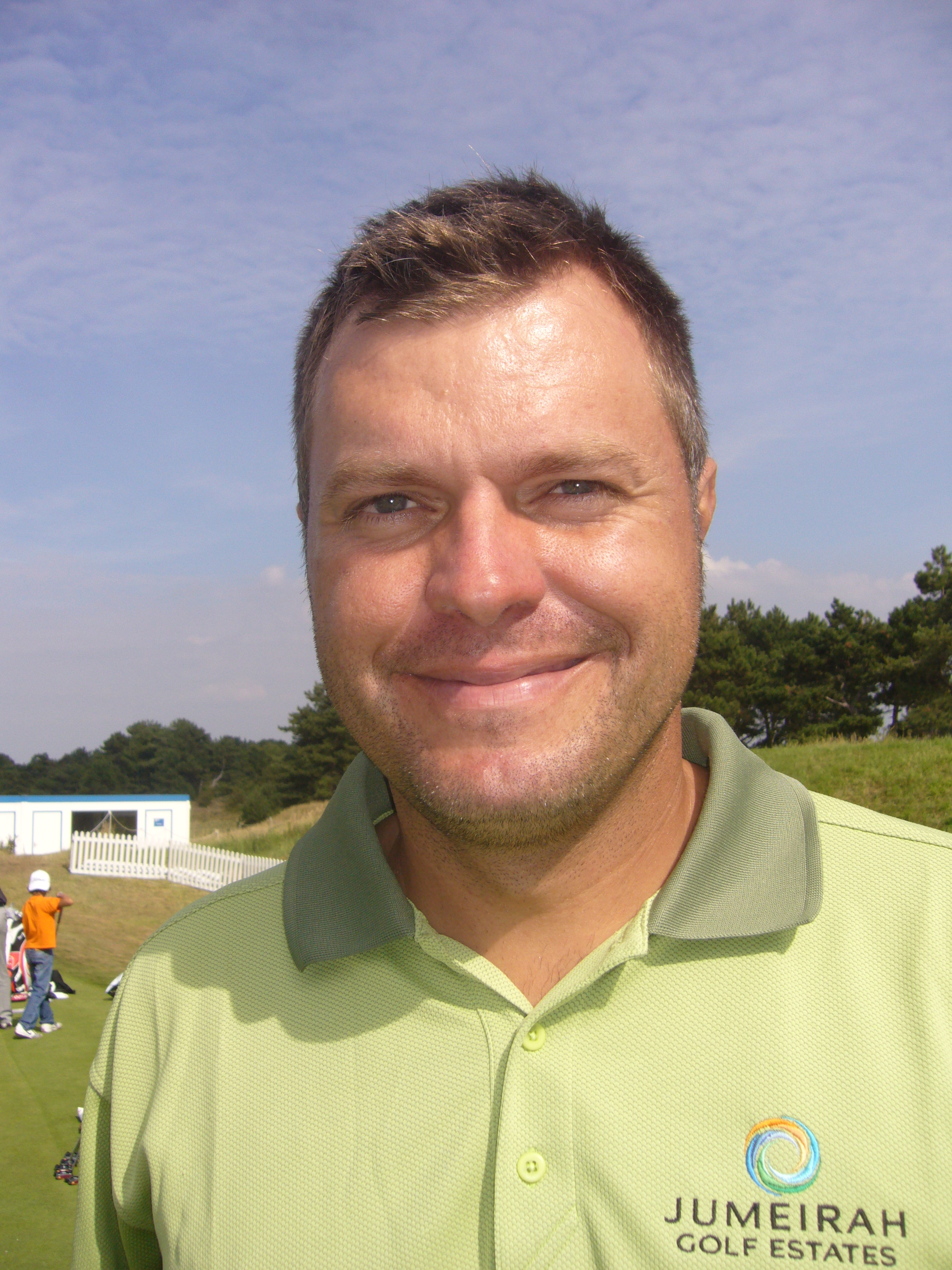
- Lara at the 2009 KLM Open

Personal information
- Full name: José Manuel Lara
- Nationality: Spain
- Born: 21 May 1977 (age 49) Valencia, Spain
- Height: 1.85 m (6 ft 1 in)
- Weight: 87 kg (192 lb; 13.7 st)

Career
- Sport: Golf
- Turned professional: 1997
- Former tours: European Tour; Challenge Tour
- Professional wins: 10
- Highest ranking: 76 (24 December 2006)

Number of wins by tour
- European Tour: 2
- Challenge Tour: 1
- Other: 7

Best results in major championships
- Masters Tournament: DNP
- PGA Championship: DNP
- U.S. Open: CUT: 2009
- The Open Championship: CUT: 2010
Medal record
Mediterranean Games
| Silver medal – second place | 1993 Languedoc-Roussillon | Men's team |

José Manuel Lara (born 21 May 1977) is a Spanish professional golfer.

== Career ==
Lara was born in Valencia, Spain. He turned professional in 1997, and has competed on the European Tour since 2001, having finished 11th in the previous seasons Challenge Tour rankings. From 2003 to 2012, he maintained his tour card by finishing inside the top 115 on the Order of Merit, with a best of 30th place in 2006. However, after a poor 2013 season in which he only made 7 cuts from 29 tour events, he finished 154th on the money list and failed to regain his card at Q-School.

Lara claimed his first European Tour victory at the Hong Kong Open in November 2006. He has featured in the top 100 of the Official World Golf Ranking.

At the 2012 BMW International Open, Lara was disqualified after his caddie tried to hide an illegal 15th club. In 2017, Lara was briefly the caddie for Sergio García. García's regular caddie left temporarily after his wife gave birth.

Lara is running a golf TV show at Movistar Golf Channel, named Movistar Lara Golf Academy, and is a golf director of A La Roca Golf Academy by Jmlara, at la Roca golf club, close to Barcelóna.

== Amateur wins ==
- 1996 European Junior Amateur Championship, Spanish International Amateur Championship

== Professional wins (10) ==
=== European Tour wins (2) ===
| No. | Date | Tournament | Winning score | Margin of victory | Runner-up |
|---|---|---|---|---|---|
| 1 | 19 Nov 2006 (2007 season) | UBS Hong Kong Open^{1} | −15 (64-66-66-69=265) | 1 stroke | (Philippines) Juvic Pagunsan |
| 2 | 19 Sep 2010 | Austrian Golf Open | −17 (66-71-70-64=271) | Playoff | (England) David Lynn |

^{1}Co-sanctioned by the Asian Tour

European Tour playoff record (1–0)

| No. | Year | Tournament | Opponent | Result |
|---|---|---|---|---|
| 1 | 2010 | Austrian Golf Open | (England) David Lynn | Won with par on first extra hole |

=== Challenge Tour wins (1) ===
| No. | Date | Tournament | Winning score | Margin of victory | Runner-up |
|---|---|---|---|---|---|
| 1 | 13 Sep 1998 | Warsaw Golf Open | −11 (69-70-66-68=273) | 2 strokes | (Sweden) Raimo Sjöberg |

=== Alps Tour wins (1) ===
| No. | Date | Tournament | Winning score | Margin of victory | Runner-up |
|---|---|---|---|---|---|
| 1 | 14 Mar 2009 | Peugeot Loewe Tour Escorpión | −5 (70-69-69=208) | Playoff | (Spain) Xavier Guzmán |

=== Other wins (6) ===
- 2001 Peugeot Oliva Nova, Peugeot Pula Golf, Ganador Gran Final Circuito Español
- 2008 Peugeot Loewe Tour de Maioris
- 2010 Peugeot Loewe Tour de Maioris
- 2011 Peugeot Loewe Tour Golf Escorpión

== Results in major championships ==
| Tournament | 2009 | 2010 |
|---|---|---|
| U.S. Open | CUT | |
| The Open Championship | | CUT |

Note: Lara never played in the Masters Tournament or the PGA Championship.

Did not play

CUT = missed the half-way cut

== Results in World Golf Championships ==
| Tournament | 2007 |
|---|---|
| Match Play | |
| Championship | |
| Invitational | 76 |

Did not play

== Team appearances ==
Amateur

- Jacques Léglise Trophy (representing the Continent of Europe): 1993, 1994, 1995
- European Boys' Team Championship (representing Spain): 1995
- European Amateur Team Championship (representing Spain): 1995, 1997 (winners)
- European Youths' Team Championship (representing Spain): 1996
- Eisenhower Trophy (representing Spain): 1996
- St Andrews Trophy (representing the Continent of Europe): 1996

Professional

- World Cup (representing Spain): 2007
