= Chris Hanell =

Swedish professional golfer

Personal information
- Full name: Christopher Hanell
- Nationality: Sweden
- Born: 30 May 1973 (age 53) Västervik, Sweden
- Height: 1.83 m (6 ft 0 in)

Career
- Sport: Golf
- College: Arizona State University
- Turned professional: 1997
- Current tour: European Senior Tour
- Former tours: European Tour; Challenge Tour
- Professional wins: 2

Number of wins by tour
- European Tour: 1
- Challenge Tour: 1
- Other: 1

Best results in major championships
- Masters Tournament: DNP
- PGA Championship: DNP
- U.S. Open: DNP
- The Open Championship: CUT: 1999

Achievements and awards
- Pac-10 Player of the Year: 1997
- Sun Angel Athlete of the Year: 1997
- Golfweek Collegiate Player of the Year: 1997

Christopher Hanell (born 30 May 1973) is a Swedish professional golfer. He played on the European Tour for 10 seasons 1999–2008 and won the Madeira Island Open.

== Early life and amateur career ==
Hanell was born in Västervik. He attended Arizona State University 1992–1997 and was part of the winning NCAA Division I Championship team in 1996. He won two individual collegiate titles, the 1994 TaylorMade Big Island Intercollegiate in Hawaii where he defeated Tiger Woods after sinking a 15-foot birdie on the first sudden-death playoff hole, and the 1996 Golf Digest Collegiate.

He was three-time All-American (1994, 1996, 1997) and three-time Academic All-American (1995, 1996, 1997). Hanell was Pac-10 Player of the Year, Sun Angel Athlete of the Year, and was the Golfweek Collegiate Player of the Year in 1997.

Hanell was on the national team and represented Europe at the Jacques Léglise Trophy and St Andrews Trophy. He won the 1991 European Boys' Team Championship in Oslo, and at the 1995 European Amateur Team Championship in Antwerp his team won bronze. He teamed up with Martin Erlandsson, Leif Westerberg and Daniel Olsson for the 1996 Eisenhower Trophy in Manila, where they finished runner-up behind Australia.

== Professional career ==
Hanell turned professional in 1997 and joined the Challenge Tour, where he was runner-up at the 1998 Finnish Masters. He gained his European Tour card in 1998 after finishing 13th in the Challenge Tour rankings. In his rookie season, he finished 3rd at the 1999 British Masters behind Bob May and Colin Montgomerie. Hanell claimed his first European Tour victory at the 2004 Madeira Island Open and recorded a career-best of 62nd place on the European Tour Order of Merit in both 1999 and 2004. He retired in 2008 after spending 10 years on the European Tour.

In 2023, he joined the European Senior Tour.

Hanell was appointed board member of PGA European Tour (European Tour Group) in 2009.

== Amateur wins ==
- 1994 TaylorMade Big Island Intercollegiate
- 1996 Golf Digest Collegiate

== Professional wins (2) ==
=== European Tour wins (1) ===
| No. | Date | Tournament | Winning score | Margin of victory | Runners-up |
|---|---|---|---|---|---|
| 1 | 28 Mar 2004 | Madeira Island Open^{1} | −4 (73-67-73-71=284) | 1 stroke | (Sweden) Steven Jeppesen, (Australia) Brad Kennedy, (United States) Rob Rashell |

^{1}Dual-ranking event with the Challenge Tour

=== Challenge Tour wins (1) ===
| No. | Date | Tournament | Winning score | Margin of victory | Runners-up |
|---|---|---|---|---|---|
| 1 | 28 Mar 2004 | Madeira Island Open^{1} | −4 (73-67-73-71=284) | 1 stroke | (Sweden) Steven Jeppesen, (Australia) Brad Kennedy, (United States) Rob Rashell |

^{1}Dual-ranking event with the European Tour

=== Swedish Golf Tour wins (1) ===
| No. | Date | Tournament | Winning score | Margin of victory | Runners-up |
|---|---|---|---|---|---|
| 1 | 18 Aug 1996 | Gefle Open (as an amateur) | −8 (69-72-67=208) | 3 strokes | (Sweden) Niclas Johnsson, (Sweden) Lars Tingvall |

== Results in major championships ==
| Tournament | 1999 |
|---|---|
| The Open Championship | CUT |

CUT = missed the halfway cut
Note: Hanell only played in The Open Championship.

== Team appearances ==
Amateur

- European Boys' Team Championship (representing Finland): 1991 (winners)
- Jacques Léglise Trophy (representing the Continent of Europe): 1991
- European Youths' Team Championship: 1994
- St Andrews Trophy (representing the Continent of Europe): 1994
- European Amateur Team Championship (representing Sweden): 1995
- Eisenhower Trophy (representing Sweden): 1996
