= Keith Nolan (golfer) =

Irish professional golfer

Personal information
- Nationality: Ireland
- Born: 11 January 1973 (age 53) Bray, Ireland
- Height: 1.75 m (5 ft 9 in)

Career
- Sport: Golf
- College: East Tennessee State University
- Turned professional: 1997
- Former tours: PGA Tour; Nationwide Tour

Keith Nolan (born 11 January 1973) is an Irish professional golfer. Nolan has been a member of the PGA Tour and Nationwide Tour.

== Early life and amateur career ==
In 1973, Nolan was born in Bray, Ireland. He attended East Tennessee State University (ETSU) in the United States on a golf scholarship. He studied Communications and was awarded All-American honors.

He had a successful amateur golf career which included winning both the Irish matchplay and strokeplay championships and representing Great Britain and Ireland in the 1997 Walker Cup.

He also represented Ireland at the 1997 European Amateur Team Championship on home soil at Portmarnock Golf Club, where he won the 36-hole stroke-play competition individually.

== Professional career ==
Since turning professional at the end of 1997, Nolan has competed on both the PGA Tour and its official development tour, the Nationwide Tour. Having found little success in tournament golf, he has also worked as an assistant coach at ETSU as well as caddying for Garrett Willis on the PGA Tour.

== Amateur wins ==
- 1996 Irish Amateur Open Championship
- 1997 Irish Amateur Open Championship

== Team appearances ==
Amateur

- European Youths' Team Championship (representing Ireland): 1994 (winners)
- Eisenhower Trophy (representing Great Britain & Ireland): 1996
- European Amateur Team Championship (representing Ireland): 1995, 1997
- St Andrews Trophy (representing Great Britain & Ireland): 1996 (winners)
- Palmer Cup (representing Great Britain & Ireland): 1997
- Walker Cup (representing Great Britain & Ireland): 1997

== See also ==
- 1997 PGA Tour Qualifying School graduates
- 1999 PGA Tour Qualifying School graduates
