= 1997 European Amateur Team Championship =

Golf competition

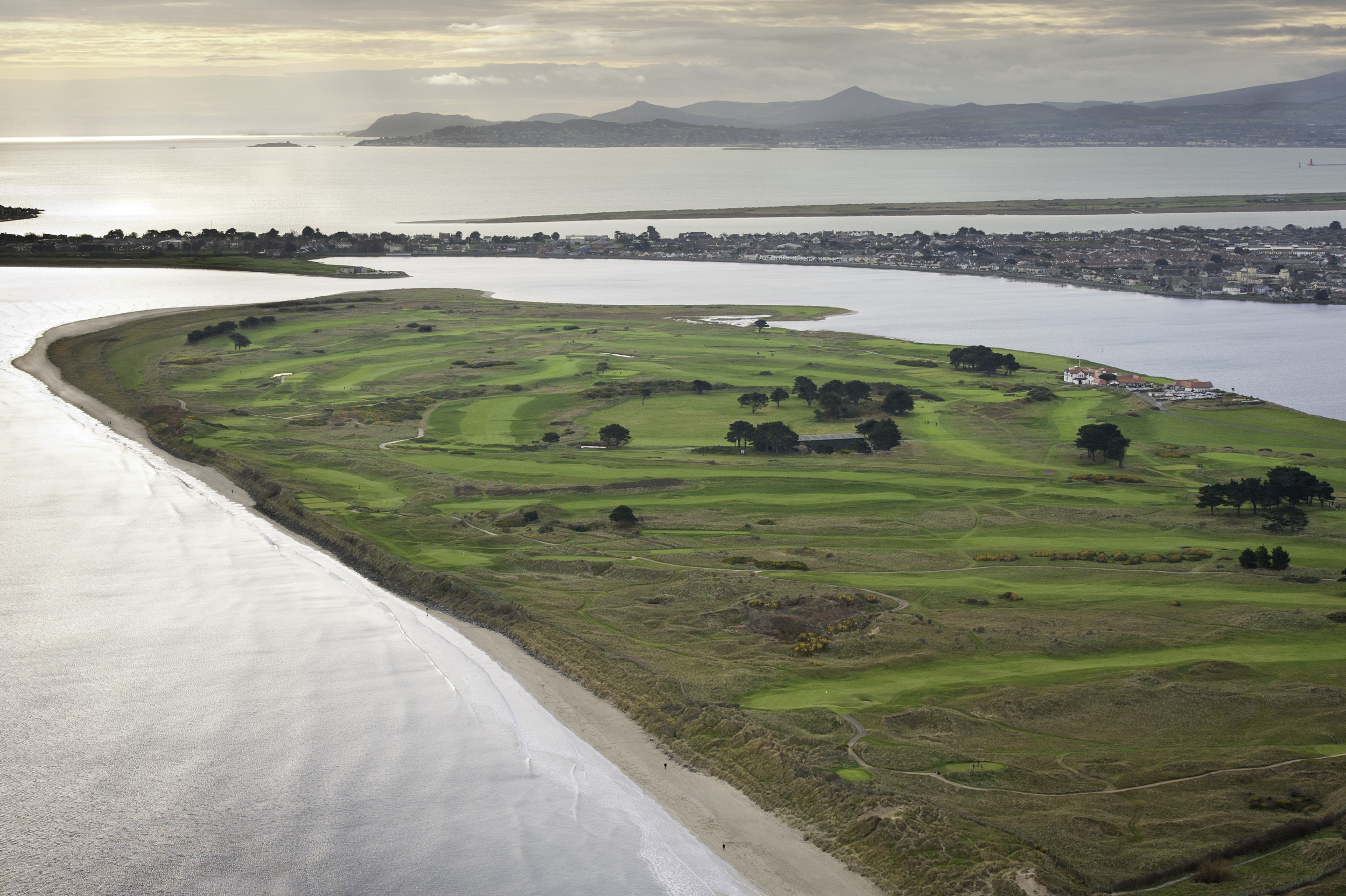
- Aerial View of Portmarnock Golf Club and peninsula

Tournament information
- Dates: 25–29 June 1997
- Location: Dublin, Ireland; 53.407°N 6.124°W
- Courses: Portmarnock Golf Club, Championship Course
- Organized by: European Golf Association
- Format: Qualification round: 36 holes stroke play Knock-out match-play

Statistics
- Par: 72
- Length: 7,097 yards (6,489 m)
- Field: 22 teams 132 players

Champion
- Spain; Juan Carlos Agüero, Sergio García, José Manuel Lara, Raúl Quirós, Oscar Sanchez, Juan Vizcaya
- Qualification round: 785 (+65); Final match: 4.5–2.5

Location map
- Location in Europe Location on the British Isles Location in Ireland Location in the Dublin Area

The 1997 European Amateur Team Championship took place 25–29 June at Portmarnock Golf Club in Portmarnock, County Dublin, 10 kilometres north-east of the city center of Dublin, Ireland. It was the 20th men's golf European Amateur Team Championship.

== Venue ==
There were strong winds on the links course during the tournament.

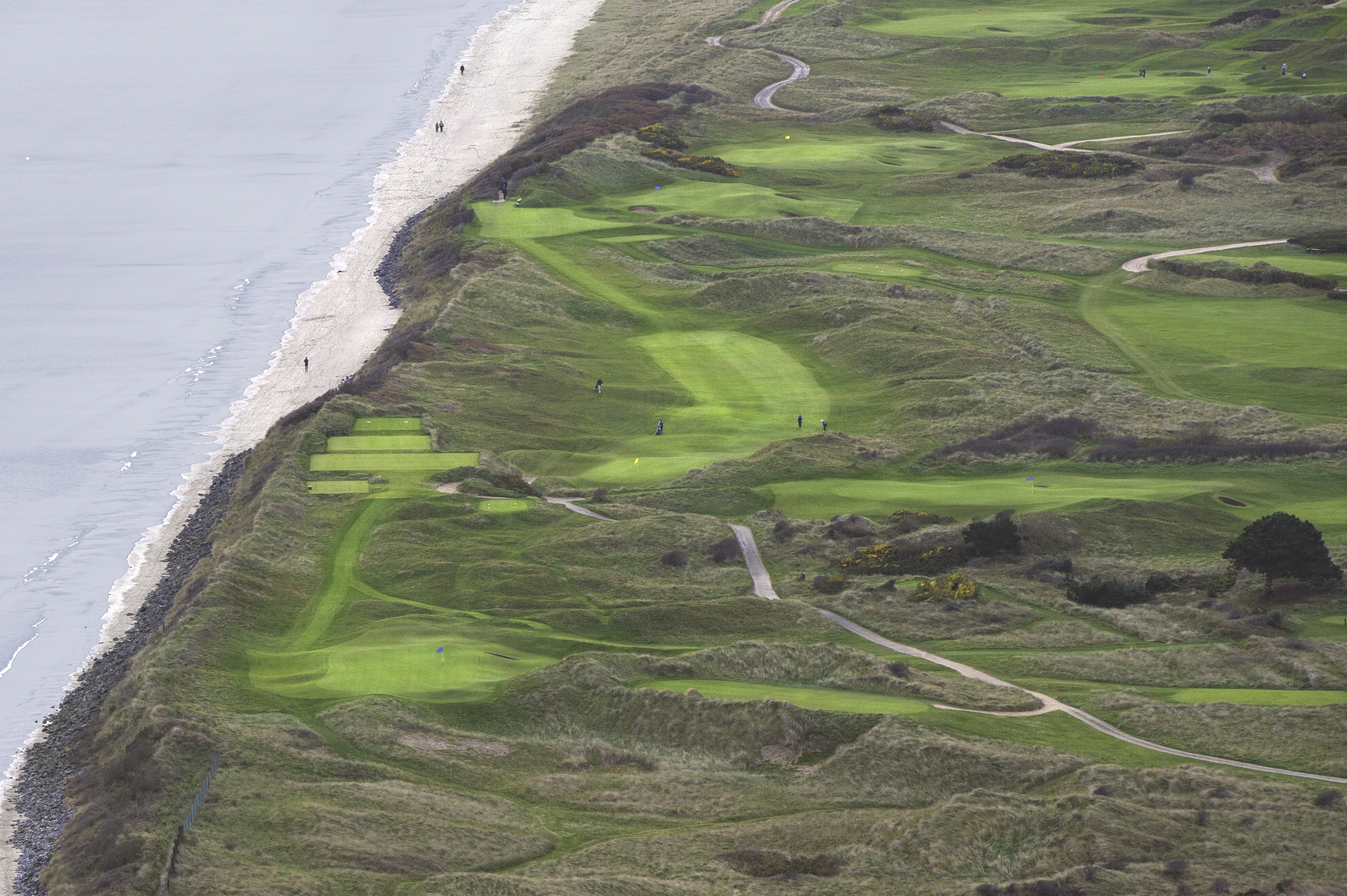
View of 14th, 15th and 16th holes at Portmarnock Golf Club

== Format ==
Each team consisted of six players, playing two rounds of an opening stroke-play qualifying competition over two days, counting the five best scores each day for each team.

The eight best teams formed flight A, in knock-out match-play over the next three days. The teams were seeded based on their positions after the stroke play. The first placed team were drawn to play the quarter-final against the eight placed team, the second against the seventh, the third against the sixth and the fourth against the fifth. Teams were allowed to use six players during the team matches, selecting four of them in the two morning foursome games and five players in to the afternoon single games. Games all square at the 18th hole were declared halved, if the team match was already decided.

The eight teams placed 9–16 in the qualification stroke-play formed flight B and the six teams placed 17–22 formed flight C, to play similar knock-out play, with one foursome game and four single games in each match, to decide their final positions.

== Teams ==
A record number of 22 nation teams contested the event. Teams representing Croatia and Slovakia both took part in the championship for the first time. Each team consisted of six players.

Players in the teams

Country	Players
Austria	Christoph Bausek, Urs Kaltenberger, Gerald Stangl, Uli Weinhandl, Niki Zitny
Belgium	Jack Boeckx, Stefan Boschmans, Didier de Vooght, Quentin d'Ursel, Francois Nicolas, Raf van Begin
Croatia	Bozidar Ivacic, Zlatan Juras, Darko Ljubanovic, Miro Raic, Drazen Slamar, Branko Stoter
Czech Republic	Miroslav Holub, Pavel Nic, Martin Peterka, Petr Safarcik, David Zelinka, Jan Zitterbart
Denmark	Søren Hansen, Klaus Molholm, Christian Kjaergaard, Lars Storm, Mads Vibe-Hastrup, Peter Thomsen
England	Matthew Blackey, Matt Carver, Justin Rose, Shaun Webster, Robert Wiggins, Gary Wolstenholme
Estonia	Carl Johan Kask, Tiit Kask, Marko Palm, Mait Schmidt, Henry Talvik, Enrico Villo
Finland	Kalle Aitala, Mikko Manerus, Mikael Mustonen, Ari Pasanen, Pasi Purhonen, Henri Salonen
France	Olivier David, Grégory Havret, François Illouz, Georges Plumet, Christophe Ravetto, Fabrice Stolear
Germany	Florian Bruhns, Tobias Dier, Felix Lubenau, Philip Neels, Benjamin Schlichting, Stephan Wittkop,
Iceland	Kristinn Bjarnarsson, Thorsteinn Hallgrimsson, Örn Aevar Hjartarsson, Thordur Olafsson, Björgvin Sigurbergsson, Björgvin Thorstensson
Ireland	Richard Coughlan, Jody Fanagan, Noel Fox, Peter Lawrie, Garth McGimpsey, Keith Nolan
Italy	Luca Fracassi, Alessandro Napoleoni, Biagio Paolillo, Stefano Reale, Massimiliano Secci, Carlo Zaretti
Netherlands	Marten van den Berg, Rutger Buschow, Niels Kraay, Maarten Lafeber, Ralph Miller, Vincent Rotenburg
Norway	Christian Aronsen. Knut Ekjord, Anders Eriksen, Morten Haeraas, Ørjan Larsen, Morten Orveland
Portugal	Alfredo Castilho Cunha, Sean Corte-Real, Stephane Castro Ferreira, Alexandre Henriques, Alfonso Martins, Jorge Rodrigues
Scotland	Michael Brooks, Alastair Forsyth, Barclay Howard, Graham Rankin, Craig Watson, Steven Young
Slovakia	Jan Balna, Pavel Kamas, Michal Oravec, Viliam Masar, Radoslav Sip, Juraj Zaris
Spain	Juan Carlos Agüero, Sergio García, José Manuel Lara, Raúl Quirós, Oscar Sanchez, Juan Vizcaya
Sweden	Joakim Bäckström, Mattias Eliasson, Peter Hanson, Daniel Olsson, Henrik Stenson, Jonas Torines
Switzerland	Marc Chatelain, Alexandre Chatelain, Ronald Groflin, Alain Krapl, John Lee, Nicolas Sulzer
Wales	Jamie Donaldson, Nigel Edwards, David Park, Mark Smith, Yestin Taylor, Mark Pilkington

== Winners ==
The host nation Ireland won the opening 36-hole competition, with a 39-over-par score of 759, 24 strokes ahead of defending champions Scotland on 2nd place, while the difference between the 2nd and 8th placed teams were 17 strokes. Four of the Irish players finished within the top nine individually. For the first time since 1975, eight-time-winners England, with future professional major-winner Justin Rose in the team, did not make it to the quarter-finals, finishing ninth.

There was no official award for the lowest individual score, but individual leader was Keith Nolan, Ireland, with a 7-over-par score of 149, one stroke ahead of fellow country man Noel Fox.

In the windy conditions on the second day of the stroke-play competition, 109 players in the 132-man-field failed to broke 80, including future European Tour winners Henrik Stenson, Søren Hansen, Sergio Garcia, Maarten Lafeber, Peter Hanson, Grégory Havret, Jamie Donaldson and Martin Wiegele.

Team Spain won the gold medal, earning their first title, beating defending champions team Scotland in the final 4.5–2.5.

Host nation Ireland earned the bronze on third place, after beating Sweden 5.5–1.5 in the bronze match.

== Results ==
Qualification round

Team standings

Place	Country	Score	To par
1	Ireland	375-384=759	+39
2	Scotland	380-403=783	+63
3	Sweden	387-397=784	+64
4	Spain	387-398=785	+65
5	Germany	385-408=793	+73
6	Denmark	391-403=794	+74
7	Iceland	396-402=798	+78
8	Netherlands	398-402=800	+80
9	England	397-406=803	+83
T10	Wales *	400-404=804	+84
T10	France	392-412=804	+84
12	Finland	393-414=807	+87
13	Italy	395-413=808	+88
14	Belgium	401-410=811	+91
15	Norway	402-411=813	+93
16	Austria	407-426=833	+113
17	Switzerland	414-420=834	+114
18	Portugal	421-432=853	+133
19	Czech Republic	441-446=887	+167
20	Estonia	465-468=933	+213
21	Croatia	490-505=995	+275
22	Slovakia	516-539=1055	+335

* Note: In the event of a tie the order was determined by the best total of the two non-counting scores of the two rounds.

Individual leaders

Place	Player	Country	Score	To par
1	Keith Nolan	Ireland	70-79=149	+5
2	Noel Fox	Ireland	76-74=150	+6
T3	Peter Lawrie	Ireland	75-76=151	+7
T3	Raul Quiros	Spain	75-76=151	+7
T5	Tobias Dier	Germany	77-77=154	+10
T5	Alastair Forsyth	Scotland	75-79=154	+10
T5	Mikko Manerus	Finland	74-80=154	+10
T5	Garth McGimpsey	Ireland	78-76=154	+10
T5	Jonas Torines	Sweden	77-77=154	+10

Note: There was no official award for the lowest individual score.

Flight A

Bracket

Quarter finals
Scotland	5.5
Iceland	1.5
Sweden	5
Denmark	2
Spain	4.5
Germany	2.5
Ireland	6
Netherlands	1

Semi finals
Scotland	4.5
Sweden	2.5
Spain	4.5
Ireland	2.5

Final
Spain	4.5
Scotland	2.5
Bronze match
Ireland	5.5
Sweden	1.5

Elimination matches
Denmark	4.5
Iceland	2.5
Netherlands	5.5
Germany	1.5

Match for 5th place
Netherlands	4
Denmark	3
Match for 7th place
Germany	5
Iceland	2

Final games

Spain	Scotland
4.5	2.5
S. Garcia / O. Sanchez 3 & 2	G. Rankin / C. Watson
J.M. Lara / R. Quiros	B. Howard / S. Young 2 & 1
Sergio Garcia	Steven Young 7 & 6
Oscar Sanchez AS *	Graham Rankin AS *
Juan Carlos Aguero 1 hole	Michael Brooks
Raul Quiros 1 hole	Alastair Forsyth
José Manuel Lara 2 & 1	Craig Watson

* Note: Game declared halved, since team match already decided.

Flight B

Bracket

Round 1
England	4
Austria	1
Finland	3
Italy	2
France	4
Belgium	1
Wales	5
Norway	0

Round 2
England	4
Finland	1
France	4
Wales	1

Match for 9th place
France	4
England	1
Match for 11th place
Wales	3
Finland	2

Elimination matches
Austria	3.5
Italy	1.5
Norway	3
Belgium	2

Match for 13th place
Norway	3
Austria	2
Match for 15th place
Belgium	3
Italy	2

Flight C

First round elimination matches

Estonia	Croatia
4	1

Czech Republic	Slovakia
5	0

Second round elimination matches

Switzerland	Estonia
4.5	0.5

Portugal	Czech Republic
5	0

Match for 21st place

Croatia	Slovakia
5	0

Match for 19th place

Czech Republic	Estonia
5	0

Match for 17th place

Switzerland	Portugal
3	2

Final standings

Place	Country
1st place, gold medalist(s)	Spain
2nd place, silver medalist(s)	Scotland
3rd place, bronze medalist(s)	Ireland
4	Sweden
5	Netherlands
6	Denmark
7	Germany
8	Iceland
9	France
10	England
11	Wales
12	Finland
13	Norway
14	Austria
15	Belgium
16	Italy
17	Switzerland
18	Portugal
19	Czech Republic
20	Estonia
21	Croatia
22	Slovakia

See also

- Eisenhower Trophy – biennial world amateur team golf championship for men organized by the International Golf Federation.
- European Ladies' Team Championship – European amateur team golf championship for women organised by the European Golf Association.
