= Max Kennedy (golfer) =

Irish professional golfer (born 2001)

Personal information
- Nationality: Ireland
- Born: 8 October 2001 (age 25) Dublin, Ireland

Career
- Sport: Golf
- College: University of Louisville
- Turned professional: 2024
- Current tour: Challenge Tour

Max Kennedy (born 8 October 2001) is an Irish professional golfer and Challenge Tour player.

== Amateur career ==
Kennedy played on the Irish national team and lost a playoff at the 2024 European Amateur.

He attended University of Louisville between 2020 and 2024, and played with the Louisville Cardinals men's golf team, where he was Honorable Mention All-American and appeared in two Arnold Palmer Cups.

== Professional career ==
Kennedy turned professional after graduating in 2024 and earned Challenge Tour status at European Tour Q-School.

He lost a playoff at the 2025 Blot Play9 in France after shooting an opening round of 60.

== Amateur wins ==
- 2019 Faldo Series Northern Ireland Championship
- 2020 Faldo Series Ireland Championship
- 2022 Mallow GC Senior Scratch Cup
- 2023 The Aggie Invitational, Ulster Men's Open Stroke Play Championship
- 2024 General Hackler Championship

== Playoff record ==
Challenge Tour playoff record (0–1)

No.	Year	Tournament	Opponent	Result
1	2025	Blot Play9	(England) James Morrison	Lost to par on first extra hole

== Team appearances ==
Amateur

- Boys Home Internationals (representing Ireland): 2019
- European Boys' Team Championship (representing Ireland): 2019
- Women's and Men's Home Internationals (representing Ireland): 2023
- European Amateur Team Championship (representing Ireland): 2023, 2024
- Arnold Palmer Cup (representing the International team): 2023, 2024
- St Andrews Trophy (representing Great Britain & Ireland): 2024
