= Leif Westerberg =

Swedish professional golfer (born 1974)

Personal information
- Full name: Leif Westerberg
- Nationality: Sweden
- Born: 28 August 1974 (age 52) Stockholm, Sweden
- Height: 1.88 m (6 ft 2 in)
- Weight: 90 kg (198 lb; 14 st 2 lb)

Career
- Sport: Golf
- College: Oklahoma State University
- Turned professional: 1997
- Former tours: European Tour; Challenge Tour; Nordic Golf League
- Professional wins: 3

Number of wins by tour
- Challenge Tour: 2
- Other: 1

Achievements and awards
- Big-12 Player of the Year: 1997
- Big-12 Men's Golf Student-Athlete of the Year: 1997
- Swedish Golf Tour Order of Merit winner: 2003

Leif Westerberg (born 28 August 1974) is a retired Swedish professional golfer. He played on the European Tour and Challenge Tour between 1997 and 2011, recording two victories. As an amateur, he won the 1992 R&A Boys Amateur Championship and the 1995 NCAA Championship.

== Early life ==
Westerberg was born in Stockholm and won the 1992 Boys Amateur Championship at Royal Mid-Surrey Golf Club, after beating Fredrik Jacobson 3 & 2 in the final.

== Amateur career ==
Westerberg was on the national team and represented Europe at the Jacques Léglise Trophy and St Andrews Trophy. At the 1995 European Amateur Team Championship in Belgium his team won bronze, and at the 1996 Eisenhower Trophy in Manila his team, which included Martin Erlandsson, Chris Hanell and Daniel Olsson, finished runner-up behind Australia.

Westerberg attended Oklahoma State University 1993–1997 and graduated with a degree in economics. Playing with the Oklahoma State Cowboys golf team he won the Big-12 Championship and was named Big-12 Player of the Year and Big-12 Men's Golf Student-Athlete of the Year in 1997. He helped his team win the 1995 NCAA Division I men's golf championship after a playoff with Stanford and Tiger Woods.

== Professional career ==
Westerberg turned professional in 1997 and played predominantly on Europe's second tier Challenge Tour over the next 15 seasons. He graduated from the Challenge Tour twice, in 2004 and 2007, when he finished 7th and 5th respectively on the end of season rankings. Both in 2005 and 2008 he failed to win enough money to retain his card on the top level European Tour, although he came through qualifying school in 2005 to regain his playing status for the 2006 season, when he finished a career high of 131st on the Order of Merit. In 2006 he recorded a tied 5th place finish at the Russian Open.

Westerberg was runner-up as a rookie in 1997 at the Volvo Finnish Open behind Søren Kjeldsen. In 2006, he lost a playoff at the Kenya Open before securing his maiden victory at the Tessali-Metaponto Open di Puglia e Basilicata. After he won the 2007 Kazakhstan Open he rose to a career-high of 257th in the Official World Golf Ranking.

In 2003, he played on the Nordic Golf League where he won the Västerås Open and was runner-up at the Viasat Sport Open, Wilson Open and Sundbyholm Open, to secure the Swedish Golf Tour Order of Merit title ahead of Pelle Edberg in second.

== Amateur wins ==
- 1992 Boys Amateur Championship
- 1997 Big-12 Championship

== Professional wins (3) ==
=== Challenge Tour wins (2) ===
No.	Date	Tournament	Winning score	Margin of victory	Runner-up
1	9 May 2004	Tessali-Metaponto Open di Puglia e Basilicata	−10 (68-68-71-67=274)	1 stroke	(England) Oliver Wilson
2	23 Sep 2007	Kazakhstan Open	−9 (64-71-71-72=279)	1 stroke	(England) Ross McGowan

Challenge Tour playoff record (0–1)

No.	Year	Tournament	Opponent	Result
1	2004	Kenya Open	(Zimbabwe) Marc Cayeux	Lost to par on first extra hole

=== Nordic Golf League wins (1) ===
No.	Date	Tournament	Winning score	Margin of victory	Runner-up
1	6 Sep 2003	Västerås Open	−6 (71-68-71=210)	1 stroke	(Sweden) Magnus A. Carlsson

== Team appearances ==
Amateur

- Jacques Léglise Trophy (representing the Continent of Europe): 1992
- European Amateur Team Championship (representing Sweden): 1993, 1995
- St Andrews Trophy (representing the Continent of Europe): 1994
- Eisenhower Trophy (representing Sweden): 1996

== See also ==
- 2005 European Tour Qualifying School graduates
- 2007 Challenge Tour graduates
