= 1996 Eisenhower Trophy =

Coordinates: 14.322°N 121.044°E

Tournament information
- Dates: 14–17 November
- Location: Manila, Philippines
- Courses: Manila Southwoods Golf & Country Club (Masters and Legends courses)
- Format: 72 holes stroke play

Statistics
- Par: 72 (Masters); 72 (Legends)
- Field: 47 teams 188 players

Champion
- Australia; Jamie Crow, David Gleeson, Jarrod Moseley & Brett Partridge
- 838 (−26)

The 1996 Eisenhower Trophy took place 14 to 17 November on the Masters and Legends courses at Manila Southwoods Golf and Country Club near Manila, Philippines. It was the 20th World Amateur Team Championship for the Eisenhower Trophy. The tournament was a 72-hole stroke play team event with 47 four-man teams. The best three scores for each round counted towards the team total.

Australia won the Eisenhower Trophy for the third time, finishing 11 strokes ahead of the silver medalists, Sweden. Spain took the bronze medal with Canada in fourth place. Kalle Aitala, representing Finland, had the lowest individual score, 12-under-par 276.

== Teams ==
47 four-man teams contested the event.

The following table lists the players on the leading teams.

Country	Players
Australia	Jamie Crow, David Gleeson, Jarrod Moseley, Brett Partridge
Canada	Robert Kerr, Craig Matthew, Brian McCann, Rob McMillan
Finland	Kalle Aitala, Mika Lehtinen, Mikael Mustonen, Pasi Purhonen
Great Britain & Ireland	Michael Brooks, Barclay Howard, Keith Nolan, Gary Wolstenholme
Japan	Hidemasa Hoshino, Tatsuhiko Ichihara, Hirokazu Kuniyoshi, Takahiro Nakagawa
New Zealand	Richard Best, Simon Bittle, Richard Hislop, David Somervaille
Philippines	Gerard Cantada, Antonio Lascuña, Reynaldo Pagunsan Richard Sinfuego
South Korea	Jang Ik-jae, Kim Joo-hyung, Kim Jong-myung, Seo Jong-hyun
Spain	Sergio García, Ivó Giner, José Manuel Lara, Álvaro Salto
Sweden	Martin Erlandsson, Chris Hanell, Daniel Olsson, Leif Westerberg
United States	Jerry Courville, Jason Enloe, Joel Kribel, Steve Scott

== Scores ==
Place	Country	Score	To par
1st place, gold medalist(s)	Australia	203-206-210-219=838	−26
2nd place, silver medalist(s)	Sweden	205-215-207-222=849	−15
3rd place, bronze medalist(s)	Spain	209-214-207-221=851	−13
4	Canada	211-207-221-216=855	−9
T5	Finland	204-214-220-221=859	−5
T5	Great Britain & Ireland	203-218-220-218=859	−5
T5	New Zealand	210-213-217-219=859	−5
T5	Philippines	204-216-214-225=859	−5
9	United States	212-210-215-224=861	−3
T10	Japan	214-223-212-217=866	+2
T10	South Korea	212-220-216-218=866	+2
12	India	212-212-218-227=869	+5
13	South Africa	209-226-220-216=871	+7
14	Chinese Taipei	215-223-218-216=872	+8
T15	Colombia	217-226-221-213=877	+13
T15	Netherlands	212-222-219-224=877	+13
17	Germany	229-215-218-217=879	+15
18	Austria	216-227-217-220=880	+16
19	Norway	210-224-222-226=882	+18
20	Zimbabwe	214-222-217-235=888	+24
21	Venezuela	221-227-224-218=890	+26
T22	Brazil	220-224-219-229=892	+28
T22	Italy	212-217-231-232=892	+28
24	France	220-228-230-216=894	+30
25	Belgium	219-228-235-213=895	+31
T26	Hong Kong	225-219-221-234=899	+35
T26	Mexico	214-226-230-229=899	+35
28	Argentina	221-230-235-218=904	+40
29	Malaysia	224-222-237-222=905	+41
30	Denmark	217-228-235-229=909	+45
31	Switzerland	222-228-237-223=910	+46
32	Portugal	219-230-236-227=912	+48
33	Paraguay	222-239-235-217=913	+49
34	Dominican Republic	231-240-238-222=931	+67
35	Chile	229-237-238-229=933	+69
36	Costa Rica	222-238-240-235=935	+71
37	Bermuda	223-231-249-233=936	+72
38	Puerto Rico	225-240-250-223=938	+74
T39	Bahamas	225-234-246-236=941	+77
T39	Morocco	228-233-251-229=941	+77
41	Singapore	231-239-250-228=948	+84
42	Czech Republic	232-246-253-230=961	+97
43	Papua New Guinea	240-248-256-231=975	+111
44	Guatemala	241-250-258-252=1001	+137
45	Russia	250-255-277-238=1020	+156
46	Estonia	246-260-277-255=1038	+174
47	Qatar	266-283-311-275=1135	+271

== Individual leaders ==
There was no official recognition for the lowest individual scores.

Place	Player	Country	Score	To par
1	Kalle Aitala	Finland	67-68-72-69=276	−12
T2	Takahiro Nakagawa	Japan	67-73-70-68=278	−10
T2	Brett Partridge	Australia	65-67-70-76=278	−10
T2	Seo Jong-hyun	South Korea	70-69-69-70=278	−10
5	Scott Rowe	Hong Kong	72-67-67-73=279	−9
T6	David Gleeson	Australia	68-69-69-74=280	−8
T6	David Somervaille	New Zealand	70-67-73-70=280	−8
8	Uli Weinhandl	Austria	68-76-68-69=281	−7
9	Chris Hanell	Sweden	68-73-66-75=282	−6
10	Andrew McLardy	South Africa	67-73-72-71=283	−5
