= 1995 European Amateur Team Championship =

Golf competition

Tournament information
- Dates: 5–9 July 1995
- Location: Kapellen, Belgium; 51°21′N 04°28′E
- Course: Royal Antwerp Golf Club
- Organized by: European Golf Association
- Format: Qualification round: 36 holes stroke play Knock-out match-play

Statistics
- Par: 72
- Length: 6,600 yards (6,000 m)
- Field: 20 teams 120 players

Champion
- Scotland; Stephen Gallacher, Barclay Howard, Hugh McKibbin, Graham Rankin, Alan Reid, Gordon Sherry
- Qualification round: 688 (−32); Final match: 6–1

Location map
- Location in Europe Location in Belgium

The 1995 European Amateur Team Championship took place 5–9 July at Royal Antwerp Golf Club in Kapellen, Belgium, 20 kilometres north of the city center of Antwerp. It was the 19th men's golf European Amateur Team Championship.

== Format ==
Each team consisted of six players, playing two rounds of opening stroke-play qualifying competition over two days, counting the five best scores each day for each team.

The eight best teams formed flight A, in knock-out match-play over the next three days. The teams were seeded based on their positions after the stroke play. The first placed team were drawn to play the quarter-final against the eight placed team, the second against the seventh, the third against the sixth and the fourth against the fifth. Teams were allowed to use six players during the team matches, selecting four of them in the two morning foursome games and five players in to the afternoon single games. Games all square at the 18th hole were declared halved, if the team match was already decided.

The eight teams placed 9–16 in the qualification stroke-play formed flight B and the four teams placed 16–20 formed flight C, to play similar knock-out play, with one foursome game and four single games, to decide their final positions.

== Teams ==
20 nation teams contested the event. Each team consisted of six players.

Players in the teams

Country	Players
Austria	Christoph Bausek Marcus Brier, Michael Etti, Philipp Mensi-Klarbach, Christian Zavratsky, Niki Zitny
Belgium	Jack Boeckx, Didier de Vooght, Gauthier d'Hollander, Arnoud Langenaeken, Nicolas Todtenhaupt, Raf Vanbegin
Czech Republic	Roman Chudoba, Jiri Kodes, Jan Kunsta, Jiri Nemecek, Martin Peterka, Stephan Slezak
Denmark	Søren Hansen, Thomas Havemann, Martin Jacobsen, Christian Kjaergaard, Nils Rorbaeck-Petersen, K. Jensen-Storgard
England	Collin Edwards, Mark Foster, Gary Harris, David Howell, Lee S. James, Gary Wolstenholme
Estonia	Valdek Apivala, Andreas Hiis, Carl Johan Kask, Tiit Kask, Jonas Maran, Toomas Palusaar
Finland	Mika Lehtinen, Harri Murtonen, Olli-Pekka Nissinen, Ari Pasanen, Pasi Purhonen, Kim Wiik
France	Jean-Marc de Polo, Raphael Eyraud, François Illouz, Raphael Jacquelin, Laurent Pargade, Christophe Ravetto
Germany	Herbert Forster, Oliver Hülse, Ralf Junge, Felix Lubenau, Hans-Günther Reiter, Jan-Erik Schapmann
Iceland	Örn Arnarsson, Birgir L. Hafthorsson Bjorn Knútsson, Björgvin Sigurbergsson, Thorkull S. Sigurdarson, Sigurpall Sveinsson
Ireland	Jody Fanagan, Pádraig Harrington, Garth McGimpsey, John Morris, Gary Murphy, Keith Nolan
Italy	Andrea Brotto, Alessandro Napoleoni, Matteo Natoli, Blagio Paolillo, Luca Ruspa, Marco Soffietti
Netherlands	Niels Boysen, Robert-Jan Derksen, Niels Kraay, Maarten Lafeber, Jeroen Germes, Alain Ruiz.Vonhof
Norway	Christian Aronsen. Knut Ekjord, Morten Hagen, Ørjan Larsen, Morten Orveland, Kristian Svalheim
Portugal	António Castelo, Alfredo Castilho Cunha, José Correia, Sean Corte-Real, Mario Nuno Coelho, Almerindo Sequeira
Scotland	Stephen Gallacher, Barclay Howard, Hugh McKibbin, Graham Rankin, Alan Reid, Gordon Sherry
Spain	Francisco Cea, Jacobo Cestino, Francisco de Pablo, Sergio García, José Manuel Lara, José María Zamora
Sweden	Mattias Eliasson, Viktor Gustavsson, Christopher Hanell, Daniel Olsson, Johan Selberg, Leif Westerberg
Switzerland	Alexandre Chopard, Ronald Groeflin, Alain Krapl, Gianluca Patuzzo, Arthur Reich, Harry Sprecher
Wales	Bradley Dredge, Craig Evans, Garry Houston, David Park, Mark Smith, Yestin Taylor

== Winners ==
Team Scotland won the opening 36-hole qualifying competition, with a 32-under-par score of 688, six strokes ahead of Sweden.

There was no official award for the lowest individual scores, but individual leaders were Pádraig Harrington, Ireland and Gordon Sherry, Scotland, each with a 9-under-par score of 135, one stroke ahead of nearest competitors.

Team Scotland won the gold medal, earning their fourth title, beating defending champions team England in the final 6–1.

Team Sweden earned the bronze on third place, after beating France 4.5–2.5 in the bronze match.

== Results ==
Qualification round

Team standings

Place	Country	Score	To par
1	Scotland	340-348=688	−32
2	Sweden	347-347=694	−26
T3	England *	356-343=699	−21
T3	Ireland	346-353=699	−21
5	France	347-353=700	−20
6	Belgium	354-353=707	−13
7	Norway	359-352=711	−9
8	Wales	368-353=721	+1
T9	Denmark *	362-360=722	+2
T9	Spain	360-362=722	+2
T9	Germany	363-359=722	+2
12	Italy	363-366=729	+9
13	Austria	364-368=732	+12
14	Netherlands	366-369=735	+15
15	Finland	368-370=738	+18
16	Switzerland	368-376=744	+24
17	Portugal	376-371=747	+27
18	Iceland	377-374=751	+31
19	Czech Republic	381-380=761	+41
20	Estonia	429-413=842	+122

* Note: In the event of a tie the order was determined by the best total of the two non-counting scores of the two rounds.

Individual leaders

Place	Player	Country	Score	To par
T1	Pádraig Harrington	Ireland	68-67=135	−9
T1	Gordon Sherry	Scotland	66-69=135	−9
T3	Morten Hagen	Norway	68-68=136	−8
T3	Barclay Howard	Scotland	67-69=136	−8
T3	Christophe Ravetto	France	69-67=136	−8
T6	Mark Foster	England	69-68=137	−7
T6	Stephen Gallacher	Scotland	68-69=137	−7
T6	Christopher Hanell	Sweden	68-69=137	−7
T6	Raphael Jacquelin	France	67-70=137	−7
T10	Andrea Brotto	Italy	66-72=138	−6
T10	Arnoud Langenaeken	Belgium	68-70=138	−6
T10	Daniel Olsson	Sweden	69-69=138	−6
T10	Gary Wolstenholme	England	72-66=138	−6

Note: There was no official award for the lowest individual score.

Flight A

Bracket

Quarter finals
Sweden	6
Norway	1
England	5
Belgium	2
France	4
Ireland	3
Scotland	4
Wales	3

Semi finals
England	4.5
Sweden	2.5
Scotland	5
France	2

Final
Scotland	6
England	1
Bronze match
Sweden	4.5
France	2.5

Elimination matches
Norway	5
Belgium	2
Ireland	6
Wales	1

Match for 5th place
Ireland	6
Norway	1
Match for 7th place
Wales	4
Belgium	3

Final games

Scotland	England
6	1
S. Gallacher / G. Sherry 4 & 3	L. James / C. Edwards
B. Howard / G. Rankin 3 & 1	G. Harris / D. Howell
Gordon Sherry 1 hole	Mark Foster
Stephen Gallacher AS *	David Howell AS *
Alan Reid 1 hole	Lee James
Graham Rankin AS *	Gary Harris AS *
Barclay Howard 4 & 3	Gary Wolstenholme

* Note: Game declared halved, since team match already decided.

Flight B

Bracket

Round 1
Denmark	3
Switzerland	2
Italy	3
Austria	2
Netherlands	3
Germany	2
Spain	4
Finland	1

Round 2
Italy	3
Denmark	2
Spain	3
Netherlands	2

Match for 9th place
Spain	4
Italy	1
Match for 11th place
Denmark	3
Netherlands	2

Elimination matches
Austria	3
Switzerland	2
Finland	4
Germany	1

Match for 13th place
Austria	4
Finland	1
Match for 15th place
Germany	3
Switzerland	2

Flight C

Round 1
Portugal	5
Estonia	0
Iceland	3
Czech Republic	2

Match for 17th place
Portugal	3
Iceland	2
Match for 19th place
Czech Republic	5
Estonia	0

Final standings

Place	Country
1st place, gold medalist(s)	Scotland
2nd place, silver medalist(s)	England
3rd place, bronze medalist(s)	Sweden
4	France
5	Ireland
6	Norway
7	Wales
8	Belgium
9	Spain
10	Italy
11	Denmark
12	Netherlands
13	Austria
14	Finland
15	Germany
16	Switzerland
17	Portugal
18	Iceland
19	Czech Republic
20	Estonia

== See also ==
- Eisenhower Trophy – biennial world amateur team golf championship for men organized by the International Golf Federation.
- European Ladies' Team Championship – European amateur team golf championship for women organised by the European Golf Association.
