= European Amateur =

Annual golf tournament in Europe

The European Amateur Championship is an annual amateur golf tournament played at various locations throughout Europe. It is organized by the European Golf Association and was one of the "Elite" tournaments recognized by the World Amateur Golf Ranking. It was first held in 1986.

The winner receives an invitation to the next Open Championship, provided they maintain their amateur status prior to the Open. Before 2016, the European Amateur was played after the Open and the invitation was for the next year's Open. Since 2017, the European Amateur has been played before the Open and the invitation applies to the current year. Both 2016 and 2017 winners received entry to the 2017 Open.

== Format ==
The top 144 amateur men golfers compete in a format consisting of four rounds of stroke play, with a cut after the third round, out of which the lowest 60 scores, including ties, qualify for the final round.

== Winners ==
Year	Venue	Location	Player	Country	Score	To par	Margin of victory	Runner(s)-up
2026	Linna Golf	Finland	Tim Wiedemeyer	Germany	271	−13	2 strokes	(Netherlands) Nevill Ruiter
2025	Vasatorp Golf Club	Sweden	Filip Jakubčík	Czech Republic	280	−8	3 strokes	(Denmark) Kristian Bressum
2024	The Scandinavian Golf Club	Denmark	Tommy Morrison	United States	279	−9	Playoff	(Republic of Ireland) Max Kennedy (United States) Preston Summerhays
2023	Pärnu Bay Golf Links	Estonia	José Luis Ballester	Spain	267	−21	2 strokes	(Wales) James Ashfield (Denmark) Mads Laage
2022	Parador Campo de Golf El Saler	Spain	Filippo Celli	Italy	280	−8	1 stroke	(Denmark) Rasmus Neergaard-Petersen
2021	Golf du Médoc	France	Christoffer Bring	Denmark	264	−20	2 strokes	(Sweden) Ludvig Åberg
2020	Golf & Country Club Zürich	Switzerland	Matti Schmid (2)	Germany	273	−11	3 strokes	(Germany) Nick Bachem
2019	Diamond Country Club	Austria	Matti Schmid	Germany	273	−15	3 strokes	(Scotland) Euan Walker
2018	Royal Hague G&CC	Netherlands	Nicolai Højgaard	Denmark	281	−7	1 stroke	(Republic of Ireland) Robin Dawson (Norway) Viktor Hovland (Netherlands) Jerry Ji (England) Mitch Waite
2017	Walton Heath Golf Club	England	Alfie Plant	England	273	−15	Playoff	(Italy) Luca Cianchetti (Italy) Lorenzo Scalise
2016	Estonian G&CC	Estonia	Luca Cianchetti	Italy	272	−16	Playoff	(Norway) Viktor Hovland
2015	Penati Golf Resort	Slovakia	Stefano Mazzoli	Italy	269	−19	1 stroke	(Republic of Ireland) Gary Hurley
2014	The Duke's St Andrews	Scotland	Ashley Chesters (2)	England	282	−2	3 strokes	(Republic of Ireland) Gary Hurley (Germany) Max Röhrig
2013	Real Club de Golf El Prat	Spain	Ashley Chesters	England	284	−4	1 stroke	(Spain) David Morago
2012	Carton House	Ireland	Rhys Pugh	Wales	277	−11	1 stroke	(Wales) James Frazer
2011	Halmstad Golf Club	Sweden	Manuel Trappel	Austria	278	−10	Playoff	(England) Steven Brown
2010	Vanajanlinna G&CC	Finland	Lucas Bjerregaard	Denmark	273	−15	1 stroke	(England) Tommy Fleetwood (Italy) Andrea Pavan
2009	Golf de Chantilly	France	Victor Dubuisson	France	277		1 stroke	(Scotland) Ross Kellett
2008	Esbjerg Golf Club	Denmark	Stephan Gross	Germany	280		1 stroke	(Netherlands) Richard Kind
2007	Sporting Club Berlin	Germany	Benjamin Hébert	France	277		Playoff	(Sweden) Joel Sjöholm
2006	Biella Golf Club	Italy	Rory McIlroy	Northern Ireland	274		3 strokes	(England) Steve Lewton
2005	Antwerp G&CC Rinkven	Belgium	Marius Thorp	Norway	280		1 stroke	(Spain) Rafa Cabrera-Bello (England) Matthew Cryer
2004	Skövde Golf Club	Sweden	Matthew Richardson	England	273		1 stroke	(England) Gary Lockerbie
2003	Nairn Golf Club	Scotland	Brian McElhinney	Ireland	283		1 stroke	(Spain) Pablo Martín (England) Matthew Richardson (Sweden) Michael Thannhäuser
2002	Troia Golf Club	Portugal	Raphaël Pellicioli	France	284		5 strokes	(England) James Heath
2001	Odense Eventyr Golf	Denmark	Stephen Browne	Ireland	270	−18	5 strokes	(Scotland) Stuart Wilson
2000	Styrian GC Murhof	Austria	Carl Pettersson	Sweden	263	−25	5 strokes	(Finland) Panu Kylliäinen (Northern Ireland) Graeme McDowell
1999	Celtic Manor	Wales	Grégory Havret	France	207	−9	2 strokes	(Scotland) Barry Hume
1998	Golf du Médoc	France	Paddy Gribben	Ireland	274	−10	2 strokes	(Wales) Craig Williams (England) Gary Wolstenholme
1997	Domaine Impérial	Switzerland	Didier de Vooght	Belgium	278	−10	3 strokes	(England) Luke Donald (England) Robert Duck (Spain) Sergio García
1996	Karlstad Golf Club	Sweden	Daniel Olsson	Sweden	276	−8	1 stroke	(Scotland) Barclay Howard (Netherlands) Maarten Lafeber
1995	El Prat Golf Club	Spain	Sergio García	Spain	276	−12	1 stroke	(Sweden) Mattias Eliasson
1994	Aura Golf Club	Finland	Stephen Gallacher	Scotland	278	−6	2 strokes	(England) Lee S. James (Scotland) Gordon Sherry
1993	Dalmahoy Hotel G&CC	Scotland	Morten Backhausen	Denmark	276		Playoff	(England) Lee Westwood
1992	Le Querce Golf Club	Italy	Massimo Scarpa	Italy	284	−4	4 strokes	(Sweden) Fredrik Andersson (Wales) Bradley Dredge
1991	Hillside Golf Club	England	Jim Payne	England	281		4 strokes	(Spain) Álvaro Prat
1990	Aalborg Golf Club	Denmark	Klas Eriksson	Sweden	279		5 strokes	(Australia) Paul Moloney
1989	No tournament							
1988	Falkenstein Golf Club	Germany	David Ecob	Australia	284	E	1 stroke	(Sweden) Cristian Härdin (Spain) Borja Queipo de Llano
1987	No tournament							
1986	Eindhoven Golf Club	Netherlands	Anders Haglund	Sweden	282		3 strokes	(England) David Gilford

In 2017, Plant won with a birdie at the second hole of a sudden-death playoff after he and Cianchetti had earlier tied a three-hole playoff at level par, Scalise being eliminated at one-over-par. In 2016, Cianchetti won with a par at the fourth hole of a sudden-death playoff after he and Hovland had earlier tied a three-hole playoff. In 2010, Trappel won the three-hole playoff. In 1993, Backhausen won the three-hole playoff by two strokes.
