= Johan Sköld =

Swedish professional golfer (born 1975)

Personal information
- Full name: Johan Torsten Sköld
- Nationality: Sweden
- Born: 28 February 1975 (age 51) Bålsta, Sweden
- Height: 1.83 m (6 ft 0 in)
- Weight: 82 kg (181 lb; 12.9 st)

Career
- Sport: Golf
- Turned professional: 1996
- Former tours: European Tour; Challenge Tour; Swedish Golf Tour
- Professional wins: 1

Achievements and awards
- PGA Future Fund Award: 2000

Johan Torsten Sköld (born 28 February 1975) is a Swedish professional golfer and former European Tour player. He won the 1999 Nigerian Open.

== Career ==
=== Swedish Golf Tour ===
Sköld turned professional in 1996 and joined the Swedish Golf Tour, where he was runner-up at the Motoman Robotics Open after losing a playoff to Daniel Olsson.

=== European Tour ===
Sköld joined the European Tour in 1997 after securing his card at European Tour Qualifying School, and recorded a best finish of tied 17th at the Volvo German Open as a rookie. He dropped down to the Challenge Tour for the following two seasons, and earned promotion back to the European Tour for the 2000 season after recording eight top-10 finishes in 1999, including an eighth place at the Challenge Tour Grand Final in Cuba.

A tie for 7th at the 2000 Heineken Classic helped him to a career-best finish of 121st in the Order of Merit (equaled in 2005), but in 2001 he had to return to Q School to keep his card, which he did by winning the event.

After another two seasons on the Challenge Tour in 2003 and 2004, Sköld returned to the European Tour in 2005 after finishing tied 13th at Q School. He recorded a career best finish of tied 5th at the 2006 Celtic Manor Wales Open, six strokes behind winner Robert Karlsson.

In total, between 1997 and 2009 Sköld played in 133 events on the European Tour and 165 events on the Challenge Tour, where he recorded 21 top-10 finishes including a best result of a tie for third at the 2006 MAN NÖ Open, three strokes behind winner Rafa Cabrera-Bello. He won the 27th Nigerian Open in 1999, at the time not sanctioned by the Challenge Tour.

== Professional wins (1) ==
- 1999 Nigerian Open
