= Ödåkra =

- Location within Skåne Location within Sweden
- Coordinates: 56°06′N 12°44′E
- Country: Sweden
- Province: Skåne
- County: Skåne County
- Municipality: Helsingborg Municipality

Area
  - Total: 3.05 km^{2} (1.18 sq mi)

Population (31 December 2010)
  - Total: 4,920
  - Density: 1,615/km^{2} (4,180/sq mi)
- Time zone: UTC+1 (CET)
  - Summer (DST): UTC+2 (CEST)

Ödåkra is a locality situated in Helsingborg Municipality, Skåne County, Sweden with 4,920 inhabitants in 2010. It is situated just north-east of Helsingborg and could be regarded as a suburb of that city. Ödåkra is known for its old distillery, which existed from 1897 to 1976 and gave the name to the spirit Ödåkra Taffel Aqvavit.

The locality is located about eight kilometres north of Helsingborg’s City Centre, and also about eight kilometres from Öresund. Immediately south of the town lies the shopping centre Väla centrum. Ödåkra is bisected by the West Coast Line (train stop on the Skåne Commuter Rail between Ängelholm and Malmö), and lies adjacent to the motorways E6/E20 and E4. The proximity of Helsingborg has made the town quite popular (about ten minutes by train), along with the large townhouse area Björka built near Väla centrum in Ödåkra in the 1980s. More housing is under development.

== Culture and associations ==
In the Ödåkra area, there were 15 active sports clubs in 2007. Ödåkra IF formed in March 24, 1927, has also included bandy, football, athletics and cycling. The athletics business was closed down in the middle of the 1950s, and the bandy operation was closed down during the 1960s. Home matches are played at the sports site Toftavallen. In 1975 the club started the so-called ’’italic’’kiddie football’’italic’’ club. Other associations in the neighborhood include the Ödåkra Riding Society, the IS Ödåkra Tennis Club, 'Boulen mitt i byn' (boules), the PRO-Norrlycke Pensioners Association and the Flening-Ödåkra Scout Group. In addition to Toftavallen, which is mainly used for football, there is also a sports hall for tennis, and a riding arena.

== Schools and municipal services ==
Ödåkra has two F–9-school: Gläntanskolan and Svenssgårdsskolan. In the surrounding neighbourhoods there are also five municipal preschools and three private ones. Regarding care for the elderly, the Tuvehagen nursing home provides services throughout the area. Within the town there is also a library. For District Nurse reception, Childcare Centre and Doctor’s Office, the residents have to go to Berga (suburban district) in Helsingborg, Sweden.

== History ==
The founding date of Ödåkra is uncertain. The toponymy suffix ending "-åkra" is derived from the late Iron Age and in 1583, the city name was written Øagre . The prefix refers either to the fact that the fields in the suffix are small and elevated, or that they were unproductive (deserted) for some time. The town was set in an elevation of the terrain and was largely surrounded by scuttle- and marsh land. The settlement was relatively unimpressive and consisted, until the 18th century, of only four farms. Instead, it was Fleninge to the east that was the dominant settlement, where the local parish church was located. To the South of Ödåkra were the settlements of Björka and Väla. When the enskift took place in Ödåkra in 1827–28, the number of farms in the town increased to eleven. At the 1862 municipal regulations, the town was incorporated into the city of Fleninge County municipality.

The great boom of Ödåkra came at the end of the 19th century. In 1885, the Skåne-Hallands järnväg (now the West Coast Line) was inaugurated through the town, and in 1884, there was already a station building in connection to this. The growth of the town gathered further momentum due to the 1898 Helsingborgs Spritförädlings AB connection to the railway. The mill was known locally as "Spritan" and was built on the initiative of wholesaler Joh(an) I. Nelsen from Helsingborg. At the start of the 20th century, there were around 30 similar factories in Sweden; each of these manufactured their own seasoned and unseasoned special brands. At the Ödåkra liquor processing plant, production started with the spiced brandy Ödåkra Square Piano Aquavit 1899. In 1917, AB Vin- & Spritcentralen took over the factory. In time, a smaller community began to develop around the factory. For the most part, this consisted of a number of houses and small apartment buildings, constructed at the junction between the railroad and the old road, north of the mill and station area. Soon after the sports arena Toftavallen was constructed in the south and in the 1940s a local dance hall named Blue Heaven was also constructed, near the Duvestubbe Forest in the west.

At the municipality reform of 1952, the Ödåkra County municipality was developed as the largest town, due to it becoming the new municipal seat. As a result, a centre area north-east of the station was established, consisting of municipality houses, libraries, post- and bank offices, and drugstores. In the 1960s, a large proportion of houses were built to the east of the station community, and the city began to take on the character of a residential suburb of Helsingborg. In the 1970s, Väla centrum was constructed between Björka and Ödåkra. To the north of the shopping centre, during the 1980s, a large housing area called Björka was built (mainly consisting of townhouses), after the historic town in the south. The local spirits processing factory was closed down in 1976, when production was moved to Falkenberg. The premises have deteriorated a bit since then, but during the 21st century, several companies have used the buildings as warehouses. Among them, IKEA had a large mid layer for importing goods in the buildings. Currently the old factory building houses small businesses including a few private art galleries, clothing and home decoration shops, a cafe, antiques shops, a small local brewery, and a few restaurants. A free entry Christmas market is held once a year on a weekend before Christmas.
