= Barclay Howard =

Scottish golfer

Personal information
- Full name: Donald Barclay Howard
- Nationality: Scotland
- Born: 27 January 1953 Glasgow, Scotland
- Died: 19 May 2008 (aged 55) Johnstone, Scotland
- Spouse: Alexandra Lawson Brennan (m. 1972; div. 1980)
- Children: 3

Career
- Sport: Golf
- Status: Amateur

Best results in major championships
- Masters Tournament: DNP
- PGA Championship: DNP
- U.S. Open: DNP
- The Open Championship: T60: 1997

Donald Barclay Howard (27 January 1953 – 19 May 2008) was a Scottish amateur golfer. He was regarded as one of the finest golfers of his time and considered a folk-hero. He has had a lifetime relationship with Cochrane Castle Golf Club in Johnstone, Renfrewshire.

== Life ==
Howard was born in Glasgow. He was married when he was 19, the marriage to Alexandra Lawson Brennan produced two daughters – Linda (b. 1972) and Lorraine (b. 1976).

Howard first joined Clydesdale Bank and later switched to Rolls-Royce, where he was made redundant in 1993. After that he became a full-time amateur golfer, that and his previous success on the golf course led him to a job in customer relations with club-maker John Letters.

Howard was a self-confessed alcoholic, leading to international exclusion in 1984. After having suffered and defeated leukemia, he died of pneumonia in 2008.

Howard was a lifelong friend of Sam Torrance, who became a successful professional golfer.

== Sporting career ==
Howard was a leading figure in Scottish and British amateur golf. Over the years he has won more than a hundred amateur tournaments.

Howard played on the Great Britain and Ireland team in the Walker Cup twice, winning in 1995 at Royal Portcawl. He has also played on the GB&I team in the Eisenhower Trophy in 1996. He was the low amateur in the 1997 Open Championship.

In his latter years, Howard was a leading figure in the Scottish Golf Union.

== Autobiography ==
Howard published an autobiography (with Jonathan Russell) in 2001 called "Out of the rough" (not to be confused with Laura Baugh's book called "Out of the Rough" or John Daly's: "My life in and out of the rough") where he describes his personal battles (against alcohol) and his inner demons.

== Amateur wins ==
this list is incomplete

- 1994 St Andrews Links Trophy
- 1996 St Andrews Links Trophy
- 1997 Scottish Amateur Stroke Play Championship

== Team appearances ==
Amateur

- St Andrews Trophy (representing Great Britain & Ireland): 1980 (winners), 1994 (winners), 1996 (winners)
- Walker Cup (representing Great Britain & Ireland): 1995 (winners), 1997
- Eisenhower Trophy (representing Great Britain & Ireland): 1996
- European Amateur Team Championship (representing Scotland): 1995 (winners), 1997
