= Anders Haglund =

Swedish professional golfer

Personal information
- Nationality: Sweden
- Born: 4 November 1964 (age 61) Borås, Sweden

Career
- Sport: Golf
- College: University of South Florida
- Turned professional: 1989
- Former tour: European Tour
- Professional wins: 2

Number of wins by tour
- Challenge Tour: 1
- Other: 1

Anders Haglund (born 4 November 1964) is a Swedish former professional golfer.

== Career ==
In 1964, Haglund was born in Borås, Sweden. He played college golf at the University of South Florida in the United States. As an amateur golfer, he won the inaugural European Amateur in 1986 at the Eindhoven Golf Club, which also won him the SR P4 Sjuhäradssporten Prize for sporting achievement of the year.

Playing mainly on the Challenge Tour, Haglund won the Open de Bordeaux in 1989 and was tied for first in the rain-abandoned 1997 Interlaken Open. He won the Husqvarna Open on the Swedish Golf Tour in 1994 and was runner-up at the 1989 Wermland Open and 1987 Volvo Albatross on the same tour. He played on the European Tour in 1996 where his best finish was a 9th place at 15-under-par in the Hohe Brücke Open.

A shoulder injury ended Haglunds golfing career in 1997 and he became a transformative coach, advising clients including the Swedish National Golf Team, the first division football team Elfsborg and the Swedish Olympic Committee.

== Amateur wins ==
- 1986 European Amateur, Spanish International Amateur Championship

== Professional wins (2) ==
=== Challenge Tour wins (1) ===
No.	Date	Tournament	Winning score	Margin of victory	Runner-up
1	15 Oct 1989	Volkswagen Open de Bordeaux	−11 (67-69-69-72=277)	1 stroke	(Scotland) Peter Smith

=== Swedish Golf Tour wins (1) ===
No.	Date	Tournament	Winning score	Margin of victory	Runner-up
1	19 Jun 1994	Husqvarna Open	−7 (65-66-72=203)	Playoff	(Iceland) Úlfar Jónsson

== Team appearances ==
Amateur

- European Amateur Team Championship (representing Sweden): 1987
- Eisenhower Trophy (representing Sweden): 1988
- St Andrews Trophy (representing the Continent of Europe): 1988
