= European Boys' Team Championship =

Amateur golf tournament

The European Boys' Team Championship (Jean-Louis Dupont Trophy) is a European amateur team golf championship for men up to 18 organized by the European Golf Association. The inaugural event was held in 1980 and it has been played annually since.

Since the European Youths' Team Championship, for men under 22, was discontinued in 2006, due to the trend of players reaching elite level at an earlier age, the European Boys' Team Championship has been regarded as the most important junior team event in Europe outside the British Isles. Many European players on the world's leading professional golf tours have played in the event during their early careers. This include (as of end of 2022) almost every European winner of professional major championships since 2010; Graeme McDowell, Justin Rose, Martin Kaymer, Sergio Garcia, Rory McIlroy, Henrik Stenson, Danny Willett, Francesco Molinari, Jon Rahm, Shane Lowry and Matt Fitzpatrick.

The championship is a counting event for the Junior Ryder Cup qualification.

== Format ==
The format consists of 16 nation teams, each of 6 players, competing in two rounds of stroke play, out of which the five lowest scores from each team's six players will count each day. The total addition of the five lowest scores will constitute the team's score and determine which team is qualified for the last three rounds of match play.

Only teams in contention for a medal will play a match format of two foursomes and five singles, while the other teams will play a one foursome and four singles match format.

Initially there were four players in each team and from 1982 until 1984 there were five players in each team. The number of participating teams has been restricted to 20 from 2004 and to 16 from 2012 and a second division tournament was introduced, making it possible for nations to qualify for the first division championship. The 2021 event took place in a reduced format, with eleven teams playing, due to the COVID-19 pandemic, why 18 teams were allowed to compete in 2022.

== Results ==
Year and course		Location	Gold	Silver	Bronze
2026	Montecastillo Golf Club	Spain	Spain	England	Czech Republic
2025	Golf Resort Kaskáda Brno	Czech Republic	Czech Republic	France	Sweden
2024	Diamond Country Club	Austria	France	England	Sweden
2023	Golf Club de Genève	Switzerland	Sweden	France	England
2022	GC St. Leon-Rot	Germany	Germany	England	Spain
2021	Furesø Golfklub	Denmark	Germany	Italy	Sweden
2020	Parador de El Saler	Spain	Cancelled		
2019	Golf de Chantilly	France	France	Germany	Sweden
2018	Golf Resort Kaskáda Brno	Czech Republic	Spain	Switzerland	Sweden
2017	La Manga Club	Spain	Denmark	Spain	Italy
2016	Diamond GC	Austria	France	Germany	Denmark
2015	Pickala GC	Finland	Germany	Sweden	Norway
2014	Oslo GC	Norway	Italy	Sweden	Scotland
2013	Murcar Links GC	Scotland	France	Norway	Italy
2012	Lidingö Golf Club	Sweden	Sweden	Italy	Germany
2011	Prague City GC (Zbraslav)	Czech Republic	Spain	Austria	France
2010	Klassis G&CC	Turkey	Belgium	Norway	Denmark
2009	Golf De Pan	Netherlands	Denmark	Germany	Netherlands
2008	Royal Bled GC	Slovenia	Sweden	Norway	England
2007	Rold Skov GC	Denmark	Denmark	England	Italy
2006	Bokskogen GC	Sweden	Norway	Scotland	Sweden
2005	Monticello GC	Italy	Netherlands	Norway	Sweden
2004	Kymen Golf Ry	Finland	England	Spain	Belgium
2003	Astoria GC Cihelny	Czech Republic	Italy	Austria	France
2002	Reykjavik GC	Iceland	Spain	Sweden	France
2001	Amber Baltic GC	Poland	Sweden	Switzerland	England
2000	Noord Nederlandse G&CC	Netherlands	Scotland	Ireland	France
1999	Upsala Golf Club	Sweden	England	Italy	Finland
1998	Gullane Golf Club	Scotland	Ireland	Scotland	England
1997	Bled GC	Slovenia	Spain	England	Sweden
1996	GC Gut Murstätten	Austria	Spain	Sweden	England
1995	Woodhall Spa Golf Club	England	England	Sweden	Spain
1994	Vilamoura	Portugal	England	Sweden	Spain
1993	Ascona GC	Switzerland	Sweden	England	Spain
1992	Conwy	Wales	Scotland	England	Sweden
1991	Oslo	Norway	Sweden	Italy	Scotland
1990	Reykjavik	Iceland	Spain	Scotland	England
1989	Lyckorna Golf Club	Sweden	England	Spain	Sweden
1988	Renfrew GC	Scotland	France	Scotland	Ireland
1987	Golf de Chantilly	France	Scotland	Denmark	Sweden
1986	Turin GC	Italy	England	Sweden	Ireland
1985	Troia GC	Portugal	England	France	Sweden
1984	Royal St George's	England	Scotland	England	Wales
1983	Helsinki GC	Finland	Sweden	Wales	Spain
1982	Frankfurt GC	West Germany	Italy	Sweden	Spain
1981	Olgiata GC	Italy	England	West Germany	Italy
1980	Real Club de Golf El Prat	Spain	Spain	England	Italy

== Medalling nations' summary ==
Rank	Nation	Gold	Silver	Bronze	Total
1	England (ENG)	8	9	6	23
2	Spain (ESP)	8	3	6	17
3	Sweden (SWE)	7	8	12	27
4	France (FRA)	5	3	4	12
5	Scotland (SCO)	4	4	2	10
6	Italy (ITA)	3	4	5	12
7	Germany (GER)	3	4	1	8
8	Denmark (DNK)	3	1	2	6
9	Norway (NOR)	1	4	1	6
10	Belgium (BEL)	1	2	1	4
11	Ireland (IRL)	1	1	2	4
12	Czech Republic (CZE)	1	0	1	2
12	Netherlands (NED)	1	0	1	2
14	Switzerland (CHE)	0	2	0	2
15	Wales (WAL)	0	1	1	2
16	Finland (FIN)	0	0	1	1
Totals (16 entries)		46	46	46	138

== Winning teams ==
- 2026: Spain: Gonzalo Baños, Raúl Gómez, Mateo Hidalgo, Yago Horno, Samuel Love Li, Nicolás Vidal
- 2025: Czech Republic: Tomáš Hejda, Roman Pivoda, Štěpán Plášek, Mikuláš Vojtěšek, Matouš Zach, Václav Švub
- 2024: France: Hugo Le Goff, Noa Auch-Roy, Arthur Carlier, Oscar Couilleau, Callixte Alzas, Aaron van Hauwe
- 2023: Sweden: Neo Berg, Jonathan Ericsson, Filip Fahlberg-Johnsson, Simon Hovdal, August Petersson, Erik Sabelström
- 2022: Germany: Tom Haberer, Finn Kölle, Carl Siemens, Korbinian Walther, Peer Wernicke, Tim Wiedemeyer
- 2021: Germany: Tiger Christensen, Tom Haberer, Finn Kölle, Carl Siemens, Peer Wernicke, Tim Wiedemeyer
- 2019: France: Claude Churchward, Quentin Debove, Charles Larcelet, Nicolas Muller, Nathan Trey, Tom Vaillant
- 2018: Spain: Alejandro Aguilera, Gonzalo Leal, Jon López-Lanchares, Eugenio Chacarra, David Puig, Eduard Rousaud
- 2017: Denmark: Oliver Hundebøll, Nicolai Højgaard, Rasmus Højgaard, Frederick Korsgaard-Sejr, Kristoffer Max, Rasmus Neergaard-Petersen,
- 2016: France: Edgar Catherine, Alexandre Fuchs, Ko Jeong-weon, Paul Margolis, Adrien Pendaries, Pierre Pineau
- 2015: Germany: Raphael Geissler, Michael Hirmer, Marc Hammer, Thomas Rosenmüller, Max Schmitt, Yannick Schϋtz
- 2014: Italy: Eduardo Raffaele Lipparelli, Stefano Mazzoli, Guido Migliozzi, Renato Paratore, Teodoro Soldati, Federico Zuckermann
- 2013: France: Paul Elissalde, Joris Etlin, Romain Langasque, Nicolas Manifacier, Pierre Mazier, Victor Veyret
- 2012: Sweden: Hampus Bergman, Tobias Edén, Marcus Gran, Hannes Rönneblad, Adam Ström, Victor Tärnström
- 2011: Spain: Pep Anglès, Adri Arnaus, Mario Galiano, David Morago, Jon Rahm, Javier Sainz
- 2010: Belgium: Thomas Detry, Gregory Mertens, Dewi Merckx, Bertrand Mommaerts, Thomas Pieters, Cedric Van Wassenhove
- 2009: Denmark: Mathias Becker Ive, Lucas Bjerregaard, Frederik Hammer, Mads Søgaard, Kasper Sørensen, Thomas Sørensen
- 2008: Sweden: Eric Blom, Niclas Carlsson, Pontus Gad, Daniel Jennevret, Mattias Nordqvist, Sebastian Söderberg
- 2007: Denmark: Nicolai Aagaard, Lucas Bjerregaard, Daniel Løkke, Nicklaez Rasmussen, Kasper Sørensen, Patrick Winter
- 2006: Norway: Are Friestad, Daniel Bo Jacobsen, Fredrik Kollevold, Anders B Kristiansen, Joakim Mikkelsen, Marius Thorp
- 2005: Netherlands: Tristan Bierenbroospot, Bernard Geelkerken, Floris de Haas, Reinier Saxton, Tim Sluiter, Floris de Vries
- 2004: England: Lawrence Allen, Matthew Baldwin, Ben Evans, Oliver Fisher, Ben Parker, John Parry
- 2003: Italy: Alberto Campanile, Federico Colombo, Matteo Delpodio, Lorenzo Gagli, Antonio Garbaccio, Marco Gueisoli
- 2002: Spain: Rafa Cabrera-Bello, Jorge Campillo, Fernando García Grout, Pablo Martín, Carlos del Moral, Gonzalo Vicente
- 2001: Sweden: Gustav Adell, Johannes Andersson, Jonas Blixt, Steven Jeppesen, Niklas Lemke, Robert Svensson
- 2000: Scotland: Stephen Buckley, Jack Doherty, David Inglis, Martin Laird, Kevin Reid, Mark Risbridger
- 1999: England: Nick Dougherty, Scott Godfrey, Sandeep Grewal, David Porter, Simon Robinson, Ben Welch
- 1998: Ireland: David Jones, Justin Kehoe, Michael McDermot, Sean McTernan, Meavyn Owens, Robin Symes
- 1997: Spain: Sergio García, David James, Álvaro Mata, Raúl Quirós, Ángel Luis Saura, Rafael Vera
- 1996: Spain: Inaki Alustiza, Gonzalo Fernández-Castaño, Sergio García, Álvaro Mata, Raúl Quirós, Rafael Vera
- 1995: England: Robert Duck, Carl Duke, Luke Donald, Jamie Little, Denny Lucas, John Wells
- 1994: England: Carl Duke, Max Harris, Jamie Little, Chris Rodgers, Steve Webster
- 1993: Sweden: Johan Axgren, Kalle Brink, Johan Edfors, Viktor Gustavsson, Henrik Ingemarsson, Daniel Olsson
- 1992: Scotland: Andrew Farmer, Stephen Gallacher, Hugh McKibben, David Orr, Alan Reid, Gordon Sherry
- 1991: Sweden: Chris Hanell, Claes Hovstadius, Mikael Lundberg, Mikael Persson, Johan Sehlberg, Leif Westerberg
- 1990: Spain: Carlos Beautell, Patricio Beautell, Diego Borrego, Francisco De Pablo, Ignacio Garrido, Francis Valera
- 1989: England: David Bathgate, Ian Garbutt, Paul Page, Michael Smith, Richard Walker
- 1988: France: Jean Charles Cambon, Christian Cévaër, Patrice Barquez, Olivier Edmond, Christophe Muniesa
- 1987: Scotland: Stuart Bannerman, Andrew Coltart, Stephen Docherty, Neil Duncan, Euan McIntosh, Alan Tait
- 1986: England: James Bennett, James Cook, Steven Edlgley, Wayne Henry, Glen Kemble
- 1985: England: Peter Baker, James Cook, Patrick Hall, Wayne Henry, Jonathan Langemead, Paul Sweetsur
- 1984: Scotland: Mark Brennan, Kenny Buchan, Calum Innes, Lee Vannet, Allan Turnbull
- 1983: Sweden: Håkan Eriksson, Per-Ulrik Johansson, Mikael Krantz, Fredrik Lindgren, Thomas Svanstedt
- 1982: Italy: Emanuele Bolognesi, Alberto Binaghi, Luigi Figari, Silvio Grappasoni, Giorgio Merletti

== See also ==
- European Girls' Team Championship – amateur team golf championship for women up to 18 organized by the European Golf Association
- European Youths' Team Championship – discontinued amateur team golf championship for men under 22 played 1968-2006 organized by the European Golf Association
