= Gordon Sherry =

Scottish golfer

Personal information
- Full name: Gordon Sherry
- Nationality: Scotland
- Born: 8 April 1974 (age 52) Kilmarnock, Scotland
- Height: 2.03 m (6 ft 8 in)
- Weight: 111 kg (245 lb; 17.5 st)

Career
- Sport: Golf
- College: University of Stirling
- Turned professional: 1996
- Former tour: European Tour
- Professional wins: 1

Best results in major championships
- Masters Tournament: CUT: 1996
- PGA Championship: DNP
- U.S. Open: DNP
- The Open Championship: T40: 1995

Gordon Sherry (born 8 April 1974) is a Scottish professional golfer. Sherry enjoyed his greatest moments as an amateur, winning the 1995 Amateur Championship, being a member of the victorious Great Britain and Ireland Walker Cup team, and appearing in The Open Championship and the Masters Tournament.

== Amateur career ==
In 1974, Sherry was born in Kilmarnock.

In 1994, Sherry finished as runner up in The Amateur Championship and played in the Eisenhower Trophy, where the Great Britain team finished as runners up. The following year, he won The Amateur Championship at Royal Liverpool Golf Club, and finished fourth overall in the Scottish Open, behind only Wayne Riley, Nick Faldo and Colin Montgomerie.

His win in the Amateur Championship gave Sherry the opportunity to play in both the Open Championship and the Masters Tournament, two of golf major championships. He gained significant attention during his participation in the 1995 Open which was played at St Andrews, starting when he made a hole in one during a practice round playing alongside Jack Nicklaus and Tom Watson. Although he finished behind Steve Webster in the race for the Silver Medal as the lowest scoring amateur, he collected £1 from fellow amateur Tiger Woods, with whom he had a friendly wager over who would achieve the highest-placed finish.

Sherry faced Woods again later that year as a member of the Great Britain and Ireland Walker Cup team. He again came out on top as Great Britain and Ireland recorded only their fourth win in the competition.

He graduated with a degree in biochemistry from the University of Stirling.

== Professional career ==
In 1996, Sherry turned professional. Despite several visits to qualifying school he never won his European Tour card. As a result, he had to rely mostly on sponsors' invitations to compete. He never managed to win a tour event although he did win the Mauritius Open in 1997.

Sherry last attempted to qualify for the European Tour in 2002. After a four-year break from competition, he started playing on the Scottish Tartan Tour in 2009 and now splits his time between tournaments on the Tartan Tour and coaching. He has also been involved with Prodream USA, a consultancy assisting British golfers to obtain scholarships to American universities, run by fellow ex-Walker Cup golfer Lorne Kelly.

== Personal life ==
Sherry lives in Helensburgh with his wife Alison and their five children.

== Amateur wins ==
- 1995 The Amateur Championship

== Professional wins (1) ==
- 1997 Mauritius Open

== Results in major championships ==
| Tournament | 1995 | 1996 |
|---|---|---|
| Masters Tournament | | CUT |
| The Open Championship | T40 | |

Note: Sherry never played in the U.S. Open or the PGA Championship.

Did not play

CUT = missed the half-way cut
"T" = tied

== Team appearances ==
Amateur

- European Boys' Team Championship (representing Scotland): 1992 (winners)
- Eisenhower Trophy (representing Great Britain & Ireland): 1994
- St Andrews Trophy (representing Great Britain & Ireland): 1994 (winners)
- Walker Cup (representing Great Britain & Ireland): 1995 (winners)
- European Amateur Team Championship (representing Scotland): 1995 (winners)
