= Martin Erlandsson =

Swedish professional golfer

Personal information
- Nationality: Sweden
- Born: 12 February 1974 (age 52) Malmö, Sweden
- Height: 1.84 m (6 ft 0 in)
- Weight: 80 kg (180 lb; 13 st)
- Spouse: Annika (m. 2004)
- Children: Emma (b. 2007)

Career
- Sport: Golf
- Turned professional: 1997
- Former tours: European Tour; Challenge Tour
- Professional wins: 3

Number of wins by tour
- Challenge Tour: 1
- Other: 2

Best results in major championships
- Masters Tournament: DNP
- PGA Championship: DNP
- U.S. Open: DNP
- The Open Championship: T68: 2004

Martin Erlandsson (born 12 February 1974) is a Swedish professional golfer.

== Career ==
Erlandsson was a top amateur golfer, representing Sweden in the 1996 Eisenhower Trophy before turning professional the following year. He joined the Challenge Tour, where he spent seven seasons before winning his first tournament in 2003 at the Izki Challenge de España and earning promotion to the European Tour for 2004. He spent a further seven seasons at this level, despite finishing three places shy of automatic qualification in his debut season and having to visit qualifying school. However, after a poor 2010 season, Erlandsson returned to the Challenge Tour in 2011.

Erlandsson's best finishes on the European Tour are a pair of runner-up placings in the 2005 Celtic Manor Wales Open and the 2009 Johnnie Walker Championship at Gleneagles. His best season was 2005, when he finished 67th on the Order of Merit.

== Professional wins (3) ==
=== Challenge Tour wins (1) ===
No.	Date	Tournament	Winning score	Margin of victory	Runners-up
1	18 May 2003	Izki Challenge de España	−15 (64-68-70-71=273)	3 strokes	(Spain) José Manuel Carriles, (Scotland) Scott Drummond, (Sweden) Peter Hanson, (England) Martin LeMesurier

=== Nordic Golf League wins (1) ===
No.	Date	Tournament	Winning score	Margin of victory	Runner-up
1	22 Sep 2002	St Arild Open	−13 (66-67-70=203)	3 strokes	(Sweden) Fredrik Orest

=== Swedish Golf Tour wins (1) ===
No.	Date	Tournament	Winning score	Margin of victory	Runners-up
1	7 Jul 1996	Uno-X Skövde Open	−8 (67-71-70=208)	3 strokes	(Sweden) Andreas Jernberg, (Sweden) Henrik Nyström

== Results in major championships ==
Tournament	2004
The Open Championship	T68

Note: Erlandsson only played in The Open Championship.
"T" = tied

== Team appearances ==
Amateur

- Eisenhower Trophy (representing Sweden): 1996
- St Andrews Trophy (representing the Continent of Europe): 1996
