= Portmarnock Golf Club =

Links golf club in Dublin, Ireland

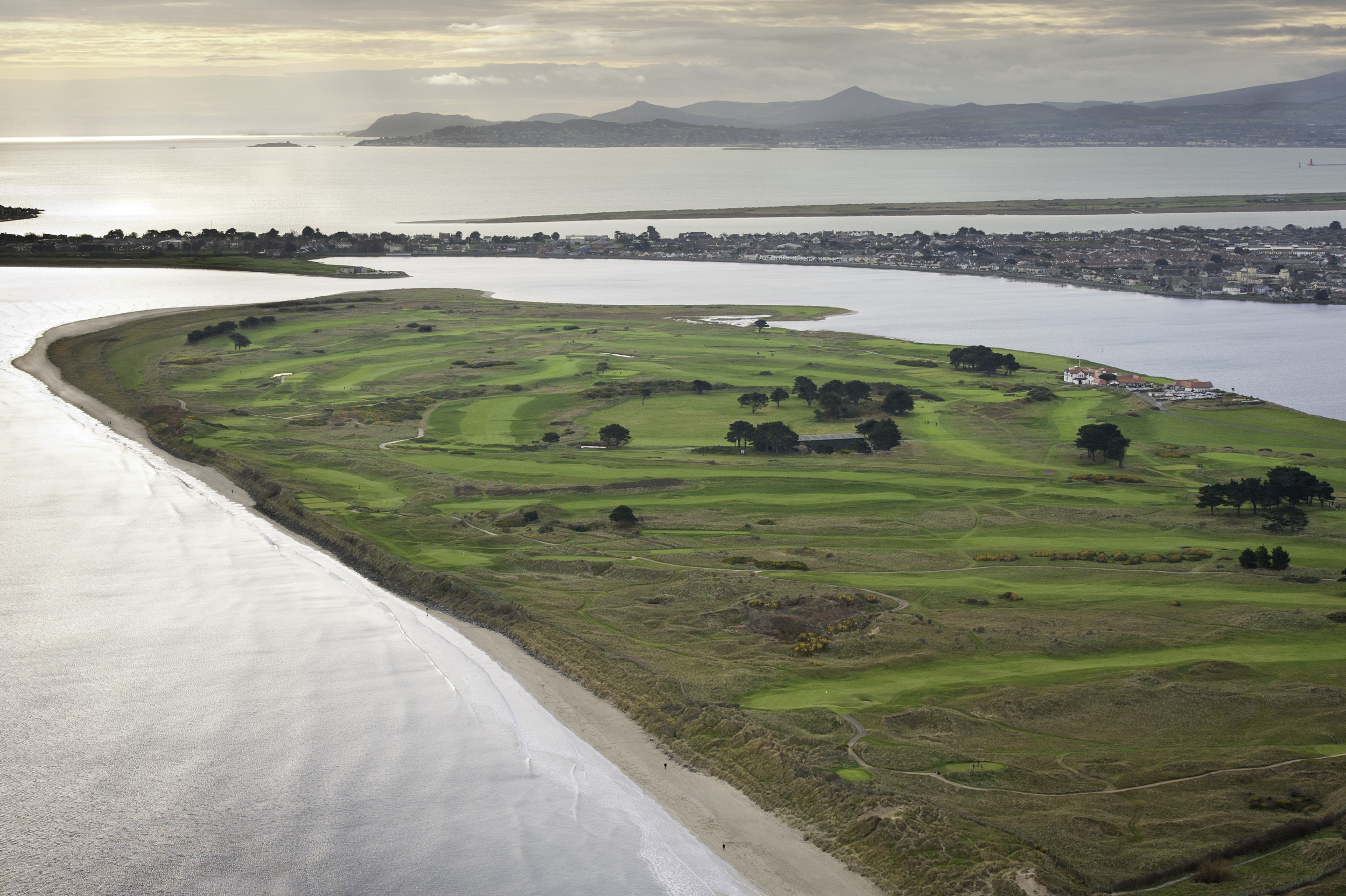
- Aerial View of Portmarnock Golf Club and peninsula

- Location in Greater Dublin
- 53.407°N 6.124°W

Club information
- Location: Portmarnock, County Dublin, Ireland
- Established: 1894
- Type: Private
- Total holes: 27
- Website: www.portmarnockgolfclub.ie

Championship Course
- Designed by: William Pickeman
- Par: 72
- Length: 7,463 yards (6,824 m)
- Course record: 68 - James Fox, Anton Albers

Portmarnock Golf Club is a golf club in Portmarnock, north County Dublin, Ireland. Its 27-hole links occupies a peninsula beside the Irish Sea, with the Championship Course often included in lists of the top 100 golf courses in the world.

== History ==
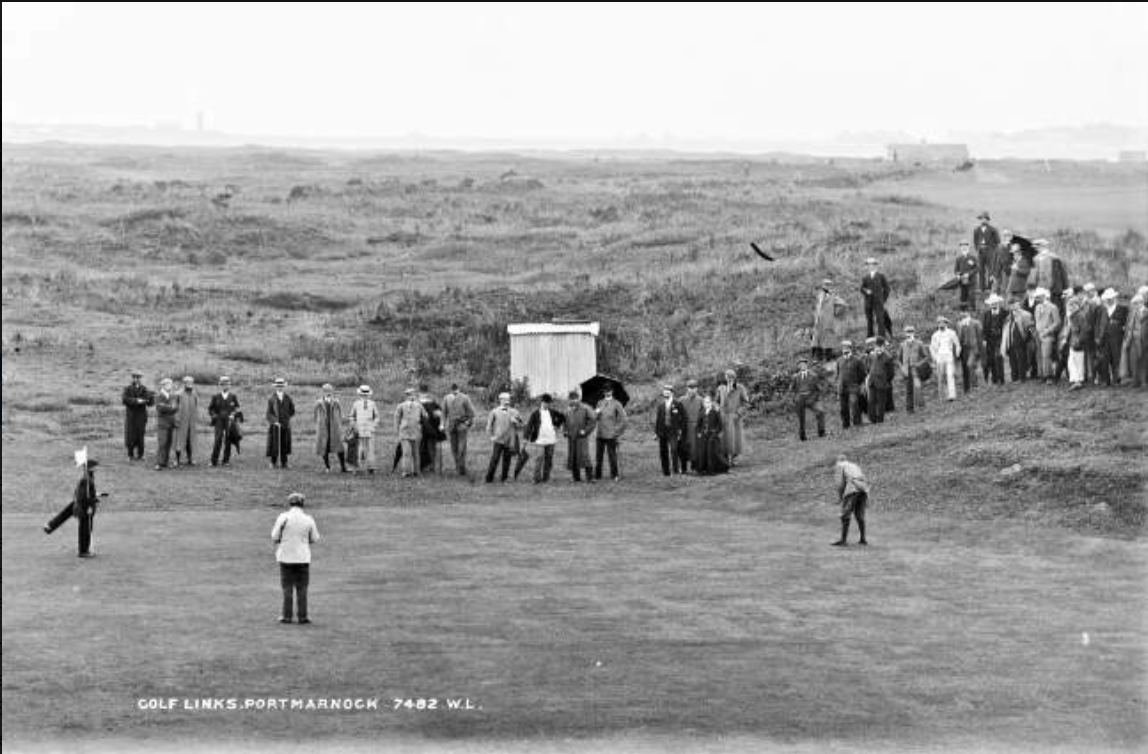
Golf Links, c.1900

The Portmarnock peninsula, on which the links was constructed, was part of "St. Marnock's Estate" owned by the Jameson family of Jameson Irish Whiskey, who built a private golf course there in the 1850s. In 1893, insurance executives W. C. Pickeman and George Ross from Sutton were looking to found a club, and after rowing across to Portmarnock to scout the area on Christmas Eve, they negotiated a 25-year lease with John Eustace Jameson on 1 October 1894. The first club president was Jameson, with Pickeman and Ross respectively Secretary and Treasurer. Jameson's sabbatarianism meant the lease stipulated no Sunday play, but this was soon waived.

A nine-hole links opened on 26 December 1894, designed by Pickeman with Mungo Park as green consultant. The course was extended to 18 holes in 1896, with a separate lease for the new territory. George Coburn, who replaced Park as club professional in 1895, assisted in the design and maintenance. The championship course follows the original layout although considerably lengthened (over 7,500 yards (6,900 m) of the Championship tees). The only major change in the routing was the insertion in 1927 of a new, now famous par three, the 15th hole. As late as 1947 the course surrounded the residences and farmland of some families, at least one of whom (Maggie Leonard) complained of disruption and refused to return lost balls. The first clubhouse was a thatched cottage rented from Leonard. A new one was constructed in 1896 but burned down in December 1905; a replacement on the same site opened in October 1906.

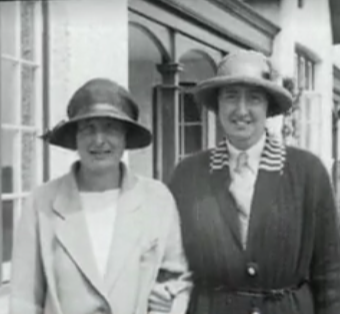
1923 Ladies' Golf Final in Portmarnock. "Janet" Jackson beat Lady Babington

In 1948 the Jamesons sold St. Marnock's Estate to the Irish Tourist Board, and in 1950 the club paid to acquire the title to 260 acres (110 ha) covering its then current grounds plus a small area to the north. The latter extension sited two of the nine holes which opened in 1971, making 27 holes in all; these nine were designed by Fred Hawtree from 1967. Natural coastal deposition added enough land to the peninsula for a fourth nine to be contemplated; by 1986, three holes had been finished and more were under construction, but a storm surge on 19 December 1990 damaged these so much the expansion was abandoned.

In the 20th century, Portmarnock was one of the most socially exclusive golf clubs in the state, along with Royal Dublin Golf Club further south. John A. Costello was club captain in 1948 when elected Taoiseach; according to Charles Patrick Graves, "for twenty years he had played the same four ball with [Dick Browne] the chairman of the Electricity Supply Board, one of the City Sheriffs, and the chairman of the Revenue Commissioners". Browne's membership helped expedite connecting the club to the national grid. While the position changed somewhat when the Celtic Tiger spawned a new range of commercially focused golf resorts such as the K Club and Mount Juliet, in 2009, Nial Fennelly said Portmarnock was "now the first and greatest of Irish golf clubs".

=== Women members ===
Portmarnock's membership was restricted to "gentlemen" until 2021. The policy had been controversial since the 1980s. The club's tradition of conferring honorary membership on the United States Ambassador to Ireland was ended in 1987 when Margaret Heckler became the first women to hold the office; she said later, "I was very disappointed ... Privately they sent word to me that if I wished friends to go there it was fine and they would be very cordially received, but it was the matter of the recognition of the office." It was similarly noted after the 1990 election of Mary Robinson as President of Ireland that her predecessor, Patrick Hillery, had been given honorary life membership after his 1976 appointment; however, no earlier President was so honoured, and Hillery had been a longstanding ordinary member.

The Irish Open was last staged at the course in 2003, after which the Government of Ireland instigated a policy of withholding public funding for events hosted by single-sex venues. The same year, the Equality Authority brought case in the Dublin District Court under the Equal Status Act 2000 (ESA). The club manager told the court that since the ESA was passed, members had three times discussed and "overwhelmingly" opposed allowing women members. In 2004 the court held that Portmarnock was a "discriminating club" within the meaning of the ESA, and the club's drinks licence was suspended for seven days.

The club appealed the 2004 decision and it was overturned in the High Court in 2005, which ruled that, although the club's admissions policy met the criterion of a discriminating club in ESA section 8(2)(a)(ii), Portmarnock satisfied the exception in ESA section 9(1)(a)(i) for clubs whose "principal purpose is to cater only for the needs of persons of a particular gender". In 2009 the Supreme Court upheld the High Court decision by a 3–2 majority.

On 9 September 2016, the R&A announced that the 2019 Amateur Championship would be at Portmarnock, adding that its recent decision not to host the Open at single-sex clubs would also apply in future to the Amateur, but that it would fulfil a prior commitment given to Portmarnock for 2019.

In May 2021, the club's existing membership voted to allow women members, by 83.4% to 16.6%. The first woman members were elected in 2022.

== Personnel ==
Club professionals

- 1894–1895: Mungo Park
- 1895–1905: George Coburn, who played for Scotland against England
- 1905–1906: Alex Guthrie of Prestwick
- 1906–1908: Bertie Snowball
- 1908–1920: James McKenna
- 1920–1925: Tom Shannon
- 1925–1939: Willy Nolan
- 1939–1950: Eddie Hackett
- 1950–1983: Harry Bradshaw
- 1983–1991: Peter Townsend
- 1991–2016: Joey Purcell
- 2016– : Francis Howley

Club presidents

Until the 1990s presidents typically served an indefinite term, some dying in office.

- 1894–1919: John Eustace Jameson — of Jameson Irish Whiskey
- 1920–1939: William George Jameson — brother of John Eustace Jameson; skipper of HMY Britannia
- 1940–1953: H. M. "Guppy" Cairnes — stockbroker
- 1954–1958: Dan L. Rogers — Dean of the Faculty of Dentistry at University College Dublin
- 1959–1967: Pierce F. Purcell — Professor of Engineering at University College Dublin
- 1968–1981: William J. Gill — of M.H. Gill & Son publishers; like Purcell, a director of the Dublin Gas Company
- 1982–1991: John F. Eustace — Dean of the Faculty of Occupational Medicine at the Royal College of Surgeons of Ireland

Since the 1990s presidents have served a limited term of years.

- 1992–1994: Noel Cuddy
- 1995–1999: M. Hegarty
- 2000–2004: Daniel Lynch
- 2005–2008: Con Harnett
- 2009: Robert C. Cuddy
- 2010–2012: Maurice Buckley
- 2013–2015: Tom Cuddihy
- 2016–2018: Jim Harnett
- 2019–2021: Gavin Caldwell
- 2022–2024: Raymond Fullam
- 2025–: Patrick Power

== Notable events hosted ==
Portmarnock was the venue for the first Irish Open in 1927, and has hosted the tournament on many occasions since, including 13 following its revival in 1975. Many other important golf tournaments have been held at the club, including The [British] Amateur Championship in 1949 and 2019, the Walker Cup in 1991, and the Canada Cup in 1960.

In October 2023 the R&A said that they were "keen to investigate the possibility" of Portmarnock hosting the [British] Open Championship or Women's [British] Open, making it the first time either tournament would be held outside of the United Kingdom. Points in its favour are space for large spectator galleries, and transport links to Dublin Airport via the M50 and Dublin city centre and points north via Portmarnock railway station. In 2024, the then Irish government agreed to support Portmarnock's candidacy, a position maintained by the government elected in 2025.

Summary

- Irish Open — 1927, 1929, 1934, 1938, 1946, 1948, 1976–1982, 1986–1990, 2003
- The Amateur Championship — 1949, 2019
- The Women's Amateur Championship — 1931, 2024
- Walker Cup — 1991
- Canada Cup — 1960

== Honours ==
- 27th best golf course in the UK and Ireland 2021/22 (Golf Monthly)
- 62nd best golf course in the world 2022/23 (Golf Digest)
- 53rd best golf course in the world 2021–22 (Golf Magazine)

== Sources ==
- Equality Authority -v- Portmarnock Golf Club & ors and Cuddy & anor -v- Equality Authority & ors [2009] IESC 73 (3 November 2009)
- Healy, T. M. (1993). Portmarnock Golf Club 1894–1994: A Centenary History. Portmarnock Golf Club. OCLC 30030013.
