= Eliot Baker =

English professional golfer (born 2002)

Personal information
- Nationality: England
- Born: 3 December 2002 (age 23) Exeter, Devon, England

Career
- Sport: Golf
- College: Hartpury University
- Turned professional: 2026
- Current tour: European Tour

Achievements and awards
- England Golf Amateur Order of Merit winner: 2025
- EGA European Amateur Order of Merit winner: 2026

Eliot Baker (born 3 December 2002) is an English professional golfer and European Tour player.

== Early life and education ==
Baker was born in Exeter, Devon, and educated at Hartpury University in Gloucestershire, where he developed his game at the Hartpury Golf Academy. He won several titles on the British Universities and Colleges Sport (BUCS) circuit, and graduated with a Bachelor degree in Sports Business Management in 2024.

== Amateur career ==
Baker had a successful amateur career and was in contention at the English Men's Open Amateur Stroke Play Championship for the Brabazon Trophy three years running, finishing 4th in 2024, 3rd in 2025 and 2nd in 2026, behind Tom Osborne. He had his international breakthrough in February 2025, winning the Portuguese International Amateur Championship, one of the elite events in continental Europe. Later that spring he won the Scottish Amateur Stroke Play Championship at North Berwick Golf Club.

In 2025, he also helped win the Women's and Men's Home Internationals and St Andrews Trophy. He played in the 2025 Walker Cup at Cypress Point Club, finished 3rd at the 2025 European Amateur Team Championship, and finished 3rd at the 2025 Eisenhower Trophy in Singapore alongside Charlie Forster and Tyler Weaver. He topped the 2025 England Golf Amateur Order of Merit.

In early 2026, he lost the final of the Spanish International Amateur Championship to Tom Osborne. He won the European Nations Cup – Copa Sotogrande individual title with a tournament-record 15-under-par total, and helped England win the team title. He made his European Tour debut at the 2026 Nexo Championship in Scotland, where he finished 15th.

At the 2026 Walker Cup in September, Baker contributed 2½ points for Great Britain & Ireland in their 13½–12½ victory over the United States at Lahinch Golf Club, the team's first win in 11 years.

In October 2026, Baker became the third player after Ding Wenyi and Cameron Adam to earn a European Tour card by topping the Global Amateur Pathway Rankings, a European version of PGA Tour University coordinated by the R&A. Baker also topped the European Golf Association's inaugural European Amateur Order of Merit (EAOM) ranking, based on a series of 16 elite amateur tournaments across the continent.

== Professional career ==
Baker turned professional in the fall of 2026 after securing his place on the European Tour for the 2027 season.

== Amateur wins ==
- 2021 BUCS Golf Tour - Midlands Tournament
- 2022 BUCS Golf Tour - Exeter Invitational, BUCS Golf Tour - English & Welsh Championships
- 2023 The South East of England Links Championship
- 2024 West of England Open Amateur Match Play Championship
- 2025 Portuguese International Amateur Championship, Scottish Amateur Stroke Play Championship
- 2026 European Nations Cup – Copa Sotogrande

== Team appearances ==
Amateur

- Women's and Men's Home Internationals (representing England): 2025 (winners)
- European Amateur Team Championship (representing England): 2025, 2026
- St Andrews Trophy (representing Great Britain & Ireland): 2025 (winners)
- Walker Cup (representing Great Britain & Ireland): 2025, 2026 (winners)
- Eisenhower Trophy (representing England): 2025
- European Nations Cup – Copa Sotogrande (representing England): 2026 (winners)
