= Calum Scott (golfer) =

Scottish professional golfer (born 2003)

Personal information
- Nationality: Scotland
- Born: 20 October 2003 (age 23) Nairn, Highland, Scotland

Career
- Sport: Golf
- Turned professional: 2025
- Current tour: Nordic Golf League
- Former tour: PGA Tour Americas

Best results in major championships
- Masters Tournament: DNP
- PGA Championship: DNP
- U.S. Open: DNP
- The Open Championship: T43: 2024

Calum Scott (born 20 October 2003) is a Scottish professional golfer. He came to prominence by winning the silver medal, as the leading amateur, in the 2024 Open Championship at Royal Troon.

== Amateur career ==
Scott was born in 2003 in Nairn, the Scottish Highlands, and begun representing Scotland internationally in 2017. He was runner-up at the 2020 Northern Open. Scott finished 3rd at the 2022 European Amateur in Spain, behind Filippo Celli and Rasmus Neergaard-Petersen, and 4th in 2024, 2 strokes behind American Tommy Morrison. He finished 3rd at the 2023 St Andrews Links Trophy behind Alex Maguire and Albert Hansson, and was runner-up in 2024, 2 strokes behind Seb Cave of England.

In 2021, Scott followed in the footsteps of his brother Sandy and enrolled at Texas Tech University, to start playing with the Texas Tech Red Raiders men's golf team alongside Ludvig Åberg.

He represented Great Britain & Ireland at the 2023 Walker Cup at St Andrews Links and won two points from four matches. He helped to beat Ben James and Caleb Surratt in the Saturday morning foursomes, but lost, 3 and 2, to Surratt in the opening match of the closing Sunday singles.

In 2024, Scott won the Open Amateur Qualifying Series to earn a start at the 152nd Open Championship after recording a second, quarter-final, and fourth-place finish in the St Andrews Links Trophy, The Amateur Championship, and European Amateur, respectively. At Royal Troon he shot an eight-over 292 to finish tied 43rd alongside Brooks Koepka and Max Homa. He beat the 11 other amateurs in the field to win the Silver Medal as the leading amateur, three strokes ahead of Tommy Morrison and Jacob Skov Olesen.

== Professional career ==
Scott turned professional in 2025. He played on the PGA Tour Americas in 2025 and the Nordic Golf League in 2026.

== Amateur wins ==
- 2018 Barrie Douglas Scottish Junior Masters
- 2020 Junior Tour Brora, Junior Tour Duff House Royal

== Results in major championships ==
Tournament	2024
Masters Tournament	
PGA Championship	
U.S. Open	
The Open Championship	T43LA

Did not play

LA = low amateur
"T" = tied for place

== Team appearances ==
Amateur

- European Young Masters (representing Scotland): 2017, 2018
- Boys Home Internationals (representing Scotland): 2017, 2018, 2019
- European Boys' Team Championship (representing Scotland): 2018, 2019
- Girls and Boys Home Internationals (representing Scotland): 2021
- Women's and Men's Home Internationals (representing Scotland): 2022
- European Amateur Team Championship (representing Scotland): 2022, 2024
- Eisenhower Trophy (representing Scotland): 2022, 2023
- St Andrews Trophy (representing Great Britain & Ireland): 2022
- Walker Cup (representing Great Britain & Ireland): 2023
- Arnold Palmer Cup (representing the International team): 2024
