= 2025 Open Championship field =

Championship qualification criteria

This page lists the criteria used to determine the field for the 2025 Open Championship and the players who qualified.

The Open Championship field is made up of 156 players, who gained entry through various exemption criteria and qualifying tournaments. The criteria include past Open champions, recent major winners, top ranked players in the world rankings and from the leading world tours, and winners and high finishers from various designated tournaments, including the Open Qualifying Series; the winners of designated amateur events, including The Amateur Championship and U.S. Amateur, also gained exemption provided they remain an amateur. Anyone not qualifying via exemption, and had a handicap of 0.4 or lower, can gain entry through regional and final qualifying events.

== Criteria and exemptions ==
Each player is classified according to the first category in which he qualified, but other categories are shown in parentheses. (Note: (a) – denotes amateur.)

1. The Open Champions aged 60 or under on 20 July 2025 (for all champions before 2024)

- Stewart Cink
- Darren Clarke
- Brian Harman (3,5)
- Pádraig Harrington
- Zach Johnson (3)
- Justin Leonard
- Shane Lowry (3,4,5,6,7,12)
- Rory McIlroy (3,5,6,9,12,13)
- Phil Mickelson (10)
- Francesco Molinari (3)
- Collin Morikawa (3,5,10,12)
- Louis Oosthuizen
- Cameron Smith (3)
- Jordan Spieth (3)
- Henrik Stenson (3)
- Ben Curtis, John Daly, David Duval, Todd Hamilton, Paul Lawrie, and Tiger Woods did not enter.
- Ernie Els did not play.

2. The Open Champions aged 55 or under on 20 July 2025 (for all champions from 2024)

- Xander Schauffele (3,4,5,10,12)

3. The Open Champions for 2014–2024 (Note: All will be aged 55 or under on 20 July 2025.)

4. Top 10 finishers and ties in the 2024 Open Championship

- Dan Brown
- Russell Henley (5,12)
- Im Sung-jae (5,12)
- Matthew Jordan
- Thriston Lawrence (6)
- Jon Rahm (9,11)
- Justin Rose (5)
- Scottie Scheffler (5,9,10,12,13,16)
- Adam Scott (5,6,12)
- Billy Horschel (5,6,7,12) did not play.

5. Top 50 players in the Official World Golf Ranking (OWGR) for Week 21, 2025

- Ludvig Åberg (12)
- An Byeong-hun (12)
- Daniel Berger
- Akshay Bhatia (12)
- Keegan Bradley (12)
- Sam Burns (12)
- Patrick Cantlay (12)
- Wyndham Clark (11,12)
- Corey Conners (Note: Corey Conners and Patrick Reed qualified via the Open Qualifying Series before becoming exempt.)
- Jason Day
- Bryson DeChambeau (11)
- Thomas Detry
- Harris English
- Tony Finau (12)
- Tommy Fleetwood (6,12)
- Lucas Glover
- Max Greyserman
- Ben Griffin
- Tyrrell Hatton (6)
- Tom Hoge (12)
- Viktor Hovland (12)
- Mackenzie Hughes
- Stephan Jäger
- Tom Kim
- Min Woo Lee
- Robert MacIntyre (6,12)
- Hideki Matsuyama (9,12)
- Denny McCarthy
- Maverick McNealy
- Andrew Novak
- Taylor Pendrith (12)
- J. T. Poston
- Aaron Rai (12)
- J. J. Spaun (11)
- Sepp Straka (12)
- Nick Taylor
- Sahith Theegala (12)
- Justin Thomas (10,12)
- Jhonattan Vegas

6. Top 25 in the final 2024 Race to Dubai rankings

- Laurie Canter
- Julien Guerrier
- Rasmus Højgaard
- Rikuya Hoshino
- Romain Langasque
- Matteo Manassero
- Tom McKibbin
- Guido Migliozzi
- Joaquín Niemann
- Niklas Nørgaard
- Thorbjørn Olesen
- Antoine Rozner
- Jordan Smith
- Sebastian Söderberg
- Jesper Svensson
- Matt Wallace
- Paul Waring did not play.

7. Recent winners of the BMW PGA Championship (2022–2024)

- Ryan Fox

8. Top five players, not already exempt, within the top 20 of the 2025 Race to Dubai Rankings through the BMW International Open

- Daniel Hillier
- Li Haotong
- Shaun Norris
- John Parry
- Kristoffer Reitan

9. Recent winners of the Masters Tournament (2020–2025)

- Dustin Johnson

10. Recent winners of the PGA Championship (2019–2025)

- Brooks Koepka

11. Recent winners of the U.S. Open (2020–2025)

- Matt Fitzpatrick

12. Top 30 players from the 2024 FedEx Cup points list

- Christiaan Bezuidenhout
- Chris Kirk
- Matthieu Pavon

13. Recent winners of The Players Championship (2023–2025)

14. Top five players, not already exempt, within the top 20 of the 2025 FedEx Cup points list through the Rocket Classic (Note: All players in the top 20 were already exempt.)

15. Top player, not already exempt, in the top 5 of the 2025 LIV Golf League individual standings through LIV Golf Dallas

- Sergio García

16. Winner of the 2024 Olympic gold medal

17. Winner of the 2025 Visa Open de Argentina

- Justin Suh

18. Top five players from the OWGR's International Federation Ranking List as of closing date

- John Catlin
- Takumi Kanaya
- Patrick Reed
- Elvis Smylie
- Daniel van Tonder

19. Winner of the 2024 Japan Open Golf Championship

- Shugo Imahira

20. Winner of the 2024 Senior Open Championship

- K. J. Choi

21. Winner of the 2024 U.S. Amateur (Note: Players must remain amateurs in order to be exempt under this category.)

- ~~José Luis Ballester~~ (Note: Forfeited his exemption by turning professional.)

22. Recipient of the 2024 Mark H. McCormack Medal

- ~~Luke Clanton~~

23. Winner of the 2024 Asia-Pacific Amateur Championship

- ~~Ding Wenyi~~

24. Winner of the 2025 Latin America Amateur Championship

- Justin Hastings (a)

25. Winner of the 2025 Africa Amateur Championship

- Bryan Newman (a)

26. Winner of the 2025 Amateur Championship

- Ethan Fang (a)

27. Winner of the 2025 European Amateur

- Filip Jakubčík (a)

28. Winner of the 2025 Open Amateur Series (Note: Cumulative World Amateur Golf Ranking points from the St Andrews Links Trophy, The Amateur Championship, and the European Amateur.)

- Cameron Adam (a)

=== Open Qualifying Series ===
The Open Qualifying Series (OQS) for the 2025 Open Championship consisted of 11 events. Places are available to the leading players (not otherwise exempt) who make the cut. In the event of ties, positions go to players ranked highest according to that week's OWGR. Unlike previous years, places won by players who later became exempt did not go to the next highest non-exempt player in that qualifying event.

| Location | Tournament | Date | Spots | Qualifiers |
|---|---|---|---|---|
| Australia | ISPS Handa Australian Open | 1 December 2024 | 3 | Ryggs Johnston, Marc Leishman, Curtis Luck |
| New Zealand | New Zealand Open | 2 March 2025 | 1 | Ryan Peake |
| South Africa | Investec South African Open Championship | 2 March 2025 | 3 | Darren Fichardt, Dylan Naidoo, Marco Penge |
| United States | Arnold Palmer Invitational | 9 March 2025 | 1 | Corey Conners (5) |
| Macau | International Series Macau | 23 March 2025 | 3 | Jason Kokrak, Carlos Ortiz, Patrick Reed (18) |
| Korea | Kolon Korea Open | 25 May 2025 | 1 | Sadom Kaewkanjana |
| Japan | Gateway to The Open Mizuno Open | 1 June 2025 | 3 | Mikiya Akutsu, Riki Kawamoto, Song Young-han |
| United States | Memorial Tournament | 1 June 2025 | 1 | Rickie Fowler |
| Canada | RBC Canadian Open | 8 June 2025 | 3 | Matt McCarty, Cameron Young, Kevin Yu |
| Italy | Italian Open | 29 June 2025 | 2 | Martin Couvra, Adrien Saddier |
| Scotland | Genesis Scottish Open | 13 July 2025 | 3 | Chris Gotterup, Nicolai Højgaard, Matti Schmid |

=== Final qualifying ===
Regional qualifying events were held on 23 June at 15 locations. Final qualifying events were played on 1 July at four locations.

| Location | Spots | Qualifiers (Note: (R) – denotes a player who progressed through regional qualifying.) |
|---|---|---|
| Burnham & Berrow | 5 | O. J. Farrell (R), Harry Hall, Frazer Jones (a,R), Jacob Skov Olesen, Justin Walters |
| Dundonald Links | 5 | Connor Graham (a), Ángel Hidalgo, Jesper Sandborg, Lee Westwood, Daniel Young |
| Royal Cinque Ports | 5 | John Axelsen, Dean Burmester, Seb Cave (a), Nathan Kimsey, Curtis Knipes |
| West Lancashire | 5 | George Bloor, Lucas Herbert, Oliver Lindell, Richard Teder (a), Sampson Zheng |

=== Additional players added to the field ===
In order to fill additional places or replace exempt players who had withdrawn prior to the start of the Championship, and maintain the full field of 156, additional players were taken in ranking order from the Week 27 (6 July) Official World Golf Ranking.

- Aldrich Potgieter (50)
- Nico Echavarría (51)
- Brian Campbell (55)
- Michael Kim (56)
- Bud Cauley (59)
- Davis Thompson (60)
- Kim Si-woo (62) (Note: Kim Si-woo replaced Ernie Els.)
- Davis Riley (63) (Note: Davis Riley replaced Paul Waring.)
