= German Boys & Girls Open =

Tournament information
- Location: Bad Saarow, Brandenburg
- Course: Golf Club Bad Saarow
- Par: 72
- Organised by: German Golf Association
- Format: 54-hole stroke play
- Month played: May

Current champion
- (Germany) Johann Mons (Boys) (Germany) Lily Reitter (Girls)

The German Boys & Girls Open, formally the German International Amateur Championship – Boys and Girls, is an annual international amateur golf tournament in Germany for boys and girls under the age of 18.

The tournament, founded in 2004, is organized by the German Golf Association. It is a qualifying event for the European team in the Junior Ryder Cup and the Junior Solheim Cup and has been rated up to level "A" in the World Amateur Golf Ranking.

In 2024, after 19 years, the tournament moved from Golf Club St. Leon-Rot near Heidelberg in Baden-Württemberg to Golf Club Hardenberg near Northeim in Lower Saxony, only to move to Bad Saarow in Brandenburg the following year.

== Format ==
The tournament is stroke play over 54 holes, 18 holes on each day of the tournament, with no cut. The field is limited to 100 boys and 100 girls, of any nationality, who compete concurrently but separately.

== Venues ==
Venue	Location	First	Last	Times
Golf Club St. Leon-Rot	Heidelberg, Baden-Württemberg	2004	2023	19
Golf Club Hardenberg	Northeim, Lower Saxony	2024	2024	1
Golf Club Bad Saarow (Faldo Course)	Bad Saarow, Brandenburg	2025	2026	2

== Winners ==
=== Girls ===
Year	Champion(s)	Country	Score	Runner(s)-up	Ref
2026	Lily Reitter	Germany	−7	(Germany) Sofia Maier-Borst	
2025	Charlotte Naughton	England	−6	(Spain) Andrea Revuelta	
2024	Antonia Steiner; Johanna Janisch	Germany; Austria	Par	— (Note: Title shared, tournament had to be terminated after two rounds due to adverse weather conditions.)	
2023	Rocío Tejedo	Spain	−10	(Germany) Helen Briem	
2022	Nastasia Nadaud	France	−15	(Czech Republic) Denisa Vodičková	
2021	Meja Örtengren	Sweden	−8	(France) Lilas Pinthier (Portugal) Sofia Barroso Sá	
2020	Cancelled due to pandemic				
2019	Emilie Paltrinieri	Italy	−11	(Germany) Lydia Volkmer (Italy) Benedetta Moresco	
2018	Ingrid Lindblad	Sweden	−14	(Italy) Alessia Nobilio	
2017	Linn Grant	Sweden	−12	(Austria) Emma Spitz	
2016	Aline Krauter; Sofie Kibsgaard Nielsen	Germany; Denmark	−8	—	
2015	Leonie Harm	Germany	−11	(Germany) Esther Henseleit	
2014	Virginia Elena Carta	Italy	−10	(Colombia) Cynthia Diaz (Denmark) Emily Kristine Pedersen	
2013	Emily Kristine Pedersen	Denmark	−14	(Germany) Karolin Lampert	
2012	Karolin Lampert (2)	Germany	−12	(France) Perrine Delacour	
2011	Karolin Lampert	Germany	−1	(Austria) Marlies Krenn	
2010	Klára Spilková (2)	Czech Republic	−6	(Denmark) Nicole Broch Larsen	
2009	Klára Spilková	Czech Republic	−11		
2008	Marieke Nivard	Netherlands	−5		
2007	Laura Alexandra Stempfle	Germany	−8		
2006	Caroline Masson (2)	Germany	−2		
2005	Caroline Masson	Germany	+4		
2004	Carolin Löhr	Germany	+10		

=== Boys ===
Year	Champion	Country	Score	Runner(s)-up	Ref
2026	Johann Mons	Germany	−8	(Denmark) Christian Photin	
2025	Filip Grave	Sweden	−5	(Ukraine) Lev Grinberg (Netherlands) Denny Kloeth	
2024	Neo Berg	Sweden	−7	(England) Bolton Ben (Italy) Bruno Frontero	
2023	Tim Wiedemeyer (2)	Germany	−13	(Germany) Peer Wernicke	
2022	Tim Wiedemeyer	Germany	−20	(Germany) Carl Siemens (Sweden) Nils Svanberg	
2021	Filip Jakubčík	Czech Republic	−12	(Italy) Pietro Guido Fenoglio	
2020	Cancelled due to pandemic				
2019	Luke O'Neill	Ireland	−11	(Germany) Philipp Katich	
2018	Charles Larcelet	France	−9	(Hong Kong) Chi Hin Lou Tan (Germany) Fredrik Strandberg	
2017	Falko Hanisch	Germany	−9	(Czech Republic) Jiří Zuska	
2016	Mike Toorop	Netherlands	−8	(Finland) Matias Honkala	
2015	Thomas Rosenmüller	Germany	−10	(England) William Enefer	
2014	Nicklas Mattner	Germany	−11	(Denmark) John Axelsen (Norway) Kristoffer Reitan	
2013	Dominic Foos (2)	Germany	−19	(Portugal) Goncalo Costa	
2012	Dominic Foos	Germany	−14	(Czech Republic) Vítek Novák	
2011	Alexander Matlari	Germany	−3	(Portugal) Goncalo Pinto (Germany) Max Rottluff	
2010	Moritz Lampert	Germany	−12	(Germany) Christian Braeunig (Germany) Jonas Robert Kugel	
2009	Martin Keskari	Germany	−6	(Finland) Teemu Bakker (France) Gary Stal	
2008	Max Krämer	Germany	−7	(Germany) Maximilian Roehrig	
2007	Nicolai Aagaard	Denmark	−7		
2006	Are "Ace" Friestad	Norway	−10		
2005	Allen John	Germany	−1		
2004	Wouter de Vries	Netherlands	Par		
