= Nevill Ruiter =

Dutch amateur golfer (born 2002)

Personal information
- Nationality: Netherlands
- Born: 15 March 2002 (age 24)
- Height: 196 cm (6 ft 5 in)

Career
- Sport: Golf
- College: College of Charleston
- Status: Amateur

Best results in major championships
- Masters Tournament: DNP
- PGA Championship: DNP
- U.S. Open: DNP
- The Open Championship: CUT: 2026

Achievements and awards
- CAA Rookie of the Year: 2022

Nevill Ruiter (born 15 March 2002) is a Dutch amateur golfer. He won the 2024 Dutch Amateur Championship and later finished in second place at the 2026 European Amateur. He played collegiate golf for the College of Charleston, and was named CAA Rookie of the Year in 2022.

== Early life and amateur career ==
Ruiter was born 2002 in Zaanstad, and was later educated at Berger Scholengemeenschap in Bergen. His home course is De Noordhollandse Golfclub in Alkmaar.

In 2021, Ruiter won his first amateur championship at the Czech International Matchplay. Later that year Ruiter joined the men's golf team at the College of Charleston. He won his first collegiate event, the Daniel Island Intercollegiate, in November 2021, and was named CAA Rookie of the Year in the spring of 2022. On day three of the NCAA Regional in Palm Springs, Florida, Ruiter had the best performance on the team, allowing the Cougars to advance to the NCAA Championship for the first time since 2001.

Due to injuries Ruiter was largely unable to golf for two years from 2022 to 2024. In April 2026, Ruiter won his second and final tournament for the Charleston Cougars, narrowly taking the Giles-Spratley Collegiate title with a score of -6.

In August 2024, Ruiter won the Dutch Amateur Championship with a final score of −13 after shooting −7 on the final day of play. Playing for the Netherlands at the 2024 European Amateur Team Championship, Ruiter's team finished in second-place behind Sweden.

In June 2026, Ruiter finished in second-place at the European Amateur, two strokes behind champion Tim Wiedemeyer of Germany. At the 2026 European Amateur Team Championship Ruiter carded the best individual score of the tournament with -9, though team Netherlands finished in 8th place. After finishing in the top-five at Dundonald Links, Ruiter qualified to play in the Open Championship for the first time. He made his major debut in July at the 2026 Open, ultimately failing to make the cut.

== Amateur wins ==
- 2021 Czech International Matchplay, Daniel Island Intercollegiate
- 2024 Dutch Amateur Championship
- 2026 Giles-Spratley Collegiate

== Results in major championships ==
Tournament	2026
Masters Tournament	
PGA Championship	
U.S. Open	
The Open Championship	CUT

Did not play

CUT = missed the half-way cut

== Team appearances ==
- European Amateur Team Championship (representing the Netherlands): 2022, 2024, 2025, 2026
- Eisenhower Trophy (representing the Netherlands): 2025
