= Antonio Hortal =

Spanish professional golfer (born 1988)

Personal information
- Nationality: Spain
- Born: 31 December 1988 (age 37) Madrid, Spain
- Height: 1.78 m (5 ft 10 in)
- Weight: 76 kg (168 lb; 12.0 st)

Career
- Sport: Golf
- Turned professional: 2010
- Current tour: Alps Tour
- Former tour: Challenge Tour
- Professional wins: 1

Number of wins by tour
- Challenge Tour: 1
- Other: 1

Antonio Hortal (born 31 December 1988) is a Spanish professional golfer.

== Career ==
Hortal has played on the Challenge Tour since 2012. He picked up his first win in April 2014 at the Challenge de Catalunya in his home country, playing as an invited player.

== Professional wins (2) ==
=== Challenge Tour wins (1) ===
No.	Date	Tournament	Winning score	Margin of victory	Runner-up
1	27 Apr 2014	Challenge de Catalunya	−14 (68-63-68=199) (Note: Shortened to 54 holes due to weather.)	3 strokes	(England) Callum Shinkwin

=== Alps Tour wins (1) ===
No.	Date	Tournament	Winning score	Margin of victory	Runners-up
1	11 Jul 2025	Alps de Las Castillas	−16 (65-68-67=200)	1 stroke	(Spain) Javier Barcos, (Italy) Filippo Bergamaschi, (Spain) Esteban Vázquez Martín (a)

== Team appearances ==
Amateur

- European Amateur Team Championship (representing Spain): 2011
