= Women's and Men's Home Internationals =

Amateur team golf competition

Tournament information
- Established: 2022
- Course: Murcar Links Golf Club (2024)
- Format: Team match play
- Month played: August

Current champion
- Ireland

The Women's and Men's Home Internationals are an amateur team golf championship for women and men, between the four Home Nations. Ireland are represented by the whole island of Ireland.The event is organised by The R&A. The inaugural event was held in 2022 and superseded separate Women's and Men's events.

== Format ==
The championship is played over three days with the four teams competing against each other in individual matches. Each team has 16 players, 7 women and 9 men. A match consists of 7 foursomes (3 women and 4 men) and 14 singles (6 women and 8 men) each over 18 holes. The result is decided by team results with each team scoring one point for a team win and half a point for a halved match. Ties are resolved by the number of individual matches won. The teams compete in separate women's and men's competitions as well as the combined event. The winning women's team receives the Miller International Shield, first presented in 1905, while winning men's team receives the Raymond Trophy, first presented in 1952.

== Results ==
Year	Venue	Location	Winner	W	Runner-up	W	Third	W	Fourth	W	Women's winner	Men's winner	Refs.
2025	Woodhall Spa GC	England	England	3	Ireland	1	Wales	1	Scotland	0	Ireland	England	
2024	Murcar Links	Scotland	Ireland	3	England	2	Wales	1	Scotland	0	England	Ireland	
2023	Machynys Peninsula	Wales	England	3	Ireland	2	Scotland	1	Wales	0	England	England	
2022	Ballyliffin	Ireland	England	3	Ireland	2	Wales	1	Scotland	0	Ireland	England	

== Teams ==
=== Women ===
==== England ====
- 2025 Sophia Fullbrook, Lily Hirst, Isla McDonald-O'Brien, Nellie Ong, Patience Rhodes, Amelia Wan, Davina Xanh
- 2024 Jessica Baker, Rosie Belsham, Lily Hirst, Isla McDonald-O'Brien, Nellie Ong, Patience Rhodes, Lottie Woad
- 2023 Rosie Belsham, Sophia Fullbrook, Jessica Hall, Isla McDonald-O'Brien, Mimi Rhodes, Patience Rhodes, Lottie Woad
- 2022 Rebecca Earl, Rachel Gourley, Lucy Jamieson, Olivia Lee, Hannah Screen, Maggie Whitehead, Lottie Woad

==== Ireland ====
- 2025 Anna Abom, Olivia Costello, Beth Coulter, Anna Dawson, Emma Fleming, Rebekah Gardner, Aideen Walsh
- 2024 Sara Byrne, Beth Coulter, Aine Donegan, Emma Fleming, Anna Foster, Kate Lanigan, Aideen Walsh
- 2023 Sara Byrne, Beth Coulter, Anna Dawson, Emma Fleming, Kate Lanigan, Mairead Martin, Jessica Ross
- 2022 Sara Byrne, Beth Coulter, Áine Donegan, Anna Foster, Kate Lanigan, Aideen Walsh, Lauren Walsh

==== Scotland ====
- 2025 Sheridan Clancy, Grace Crawford, Rosie Maguire, Abigail May, Freya Russell, Jennifer Saxton, Susan Woodhouse
- 2024 Sheridan Clancy, Hannah Darling, Carmen Griffiths, Jasmine Mackintosh, Lorna McClymont, Freya Russell, Jennifer Saxton
- 2023 Megan Ashley, Ailsa Brannock, Penelope Brown, Carmen Griffiths, Lorna McClymont, Jasmine McIntosh, Jennifer Saxton
- 2022 Megan Ashley, Grace Crawford, Chloe Goadby, Carmen Griffiths, Lorna McClymont, Cameron Neilson, Jennifer Saxton

==== Wales ====
- 2025 Millie Cottrell, Emily James, Isobel Kelly, Harriet Lockley, Luca Thompson, Ffion Tynan, Carys Worby
- 2024 Darcey Harry, Harriet Lockley, Gracie Mayo, Ellen Nicholas, Luca Thompson, Ffion Tynan, Carys Worby
- 2023 Darcey Harry, Harriet Lockley, Ellen Nicholas, Kath O'Connor, Luca Thompson, Ffion Tynan, Carys Worby
- 2022 Darcey Harry, Harriet Lockley, Gracie Mayo, Ellen Nicholas, Kath O'Connor, Luca Thompson, Ffion Tynan

=== Men ===
==== England ====
- 2025 Eliot Baker, Ben Bolton, Seb Cave, Dominic Clemons, Lewy Hayward, Tom Osborne, Jake Sowden, Freddie Turnell, Jamie Van Wyk
- 2024 Sebastian Cave, Dominic Clemons, Matthew Dodd-Berry, Charlie Forster, Daniel Hayes, Josh Hill, Will Hopkins, Tom Osborne, Harley Smith
- 2023 Jack Bigham, Zachary Chegwidden, James Claridge, Charlie Crockett, Matthew Dodd-Berry, Arron Edwards-Hill, Will Hopkins, Dylan Shaw-Radford, Tyler Weaver
- 2022 Sam Bairstow, Josh Berry, Jack Bigham, Arron Edwards Hill, John Gough, Olly Huggins, Ben Quinney, Harley Smith, Tyler Weaver

==== Ireland ====
- 2025 Colm Campbell, John Doyle, Keith Egan, Stuart Grehan, Thomas Higgins, David Howard, Jonathan Keane, Sean Keeling, Gavin Tiernan
- 2024 Colm Campbell, Paul Coughlan, Hugh Foley, Ryan Griffin, Thomas Higgins, Joshua Hill, Sean Keeling, Liam Nolan, Luke O'Neill
- 2023 Marc Boucher, Colm Campbell, Paul Conroy, Max Kennedy, Alex Maguire, Robert Moran, Liam Nolan, Caolan Rafferty, David Shiel
- 2022 Robert Brazill, Colm Campbell, Hugh Foley, Matt McClean, Rob Moran, Liam Nolan, Peter O'Keeffe, Mark Power, Caolan Rafferty

==== Scotland ====
- 2025 Andrew Davidson, Alexander Farmer, Ross Laird, Jack McDonald, Dominic McGlinchey, Samuel Mukherjee, Chris Robb, Gregor Tait, James Wood
- 2024 Cameron Adam, Andrew Davidson, Gregor Graham, Ross Laird, Jack McDonald, James Morgan, Cormac Sharpe, Gregor Tait, Matthew Wilson
- 2023 Angus Carrick, Andrew Davidson, Connor Graham, Gregor Graham, Jack McDonald, Oliver Mukherjee, Niall Shiels Donegan, Gregor Tait, Matthew Wilson
- 2022 Callum Bruce, Angus Carrick, Matt Clark, Andrew Davidson, Rory Franssen, Connor Graham, Gregor Graham, Lewis Irvine, Calum Scott

==== Wales ====
- 2025 Tom Bastow, Tomi Bowen, Caolan Burford, Sean David, Jamie Dean, Alex James, Thomas Matthews, Iestyn McAvoy, Ioan Rowe
- 2024 Theo Baker, Jonathan Bale, Tom Bastow, Tomi Bowen, Caolan Burford, Archie Davies, Tom Matthews, Matt Roberts, Max Weaver
- 2023 James Ashfield, Theo Baker, Tom Bastow, Tomi Bowen, Caolan Burford, Archie Davies, Tom Matthews, James Nash, Matt Roberts
- 2022 Tomi Bowen, Sean David, Alex James, Connor Jones, Tom Matthews, Craig Melding, Paddy Mullins, James Nash, Matt Roberts
