= Challenge de Catalunya =

Spanish golf tournament

Tournament information
- Location: Girona, Spain
- Established: 2012
- Course: Fontanals Golf Club
- Par: 71
- Length: 7,173 yards (6,559 m)
- Tour: Challenge Tour
- Format: Stroke play
- Prize fund: €300,000
- Month played: May

Tournament record score
- Aggregate: 266 Hamish Brown (2026); 266 Pablo Ereño (2026)
- To par: −22 as above

Current champion
- (Spain) Pablo Ereño

Final champion
- Location in Spain Location in Catalonia

The Challenge de Catalunya is a golf tournament on the Challenge Tour.

The first edition was played at the Golf La Graiera, Calafell in Tarragona, Catalonia, Spain. The second edition was in 2014 at the Lumine Golf & Beach Club.

== Winners ==
Year	Winner	Score	To par	Margin of victory	Runner-up	Venue
2026	(Spain) Pablo Ereño	266	−22	Playoff	(Denmark) Hamish Brown	Fontanals
2015–2025: No tournament
2014	(Spain) Antonio Hortal	199 (Note: Shortened to 54 holes due to weather.)	−14	3 strokes	(England) Callum Shinkwin	Lumine
2013: No tournament
2012	(United States) Brooks Koepka	200	−16	3 strokes	(Italy) Alessandro Tadini	Graiera
