= Pablo Ereño =

Spanish professional golfer (born 2003)

Personal information
- Full name: Pablo Ereño Perez
- Nationality: Spain
- Born: 30 December 2003 (age 22) Madrid, Spain
- Height: 6 ft 0 in (1.83 m)
- Weight: 180 lb (82 kg; 13 st)

Career
- Sport: Golf
- College: UCLA
- Turned professional: 2025
- Current tour: European Tour
- Former tours: Korn Ferry Tour; Challenge Tour
- Professional wins: 1

Number of wins by tour
- Challenge Tour: 1

Achievements and awards
- Big Ten Men’s Golfer of the Year: 2025

Pablo Ereño Perez (born 30 December 2003) is a Spanish professional golfer who plays on Challenge Tour. He won the 2026 Challenge de Catalunya.

== Early life and amateur career ==
Ereño was born in Madrid. In 2019, he won the Campeonato Junior Y U25 de Madrid, and in 2021 he won the Campeonato de Canarias by 10 strokes at a 14-under 270, after shooting 66 his final two rounds.

In 2024, Ereño was runner-up with the Spanish team at the Spirit International Amateur in Texas, and won the World University Golf Championship in Seinäjoki, Finland, both individually and with the Spanish team.

After graduating from Colegio Nuestra Señora del Recuerdo, Ereño attended UCLA from 2021 to 2025, majoring in mathematics, and played with the UCLA Bruins men's golf team. He ranked third all-time for UCLA's scoring average (71.32) and was Big Ten Men's Golfer of the Year his senior year, Bruins' first conference selection since Patrick Cantlay in 2011.

He finished 6th individually at the 2025 NCAA Championship.

== Professional career ==
Ereño finished 10th in the PGA Tour University standings, to earn Korn Ferry Tour status for 2025.

In 2026, he joined the Challenge Tour, where he was in contention at the Cape Town Open (tied 4th) and the Jonsson Workwear Durban Open (tied 3rd), before securing his first professional title at Challenge de Catalunya in his native Spain.

== Amateur wins ==
- 2019 Campeonato Junior Y U25 de Madrid, Copa Alianza Centro
- 2021 Campeonato de Canarias
- 2024 World University Golf Championship, The Tindall

== Professional wins (1) ==
=== Challenge Tour wins (1) ===
No.	Date	Tournament	Winning score	Margin of victory	Runner-up
1	17 May 2026	Challenge de Catalunya	−22 (67-69-64-66=266)	Playoff	(Denmark) Hamish Brown

Challenge Tour playoff record (1–0)

No.	Year	Tournament	Opponent	Result
1	2026	Challenge de Catalunya	(Denmark) Hamish Brown	Won with par on second extra hole

== Team appearances ==
Amateur

- European Young Masters (representing Spain): 2019
- European Boys' Team Championship (representing Spain): 2021
- Spirit International Amateur (representing Spain): 2024
- European Amateur Team Championship (representing Spain): 2024
- St Andrews Trophy (representing the Continent of Europe): 2024 (winners)
- World University Golf Championship (representing Spain): 2024 (winners)
- Arnold Palmer Cup (representing the International team): 2025 (winners)
- Bonallack Trophy (representing Europe): 2025

== See also ==
- 2026 Challenge Tour graduates
