= 2025 European Amateur Team Championship =

Golf competition

Tournament information
- Dates: 8–12 July 2025
- Location: Killarney, County Kerry, Ireland; 52.060459°N 9.563379°W
- Course: Killarney Golf & Fishing Club (Killeen course)
- Organized by: European Golf Association
- Format: Qualification round: 36 holes stroke play Knock-out match-play

Statistics
- Par: 72
- Length: 7,252 yards (6,631 m)
- Field: 16 teams 96 players

Champion
- Italy; Giovanni Binaghi, Riccardo Fantinelli, Michele Ferrero, Biagio Gagliardi, Julien Paltrinieri, Filippo Ponzano
- Qualification round: 696 (−24); Final match: 6.5 – 0.5
- Location in Europe Location in the British Isles Location in Ireland

The 2025 European Amateur Team Championship took place 8–12 July at the Killarney Golf & Fishing Club in Killarney, County Kerry, Ireland. It was the 42nd men's golf European Amateur Team Championship.

Sweden was defending champion.

== Venue ==
The club was founded in 1893, but moved in 1937 to build two 18-hole courses 3 kilometres west of Killarney, Ireland, in Killarney National Park, surrounded by the lakes of Lough Leane. The championship was played in 1975 at the club's 18-hole Mahony's Point Course, opened in 1939. The 2025 European Amateur Team Championship is played at the Killeen course, built in 1937. It has formerly been the venue for the Irish Open on the European Tour in 1991, 1992, 2010 and 2011 and the Curtis Cup in 1996.

=== Course layout ===
Tee location on each hole varies so specified hole length is approximate.

Hole	Meters	Par	Hole	Meters	Par
1	369	4	10	156	3
2	351	4	11	462	5
3	183	3	12	436	4
4	382	4	13	458	4
5	415	4	14	356	4
6	189	3	15	393	4
7	469	5	16	475	5
8	375	4	17	356	4
9	395	4	18	395	4
Out	3,128	35	In	3,487	37
Source:		Total		6,615	72

== Format ==
Each team consisted of six players. On the first two days each player played 18 holes of stroke play each day. The lowest five scores from each team's six players counted to the team total each day.

The eight best teams formed flight A, in knock-out match-play over the following three days. The teams were seeded based on their positions after the stroke play. The first placed team was drawn to play the quarter final against the eight placed team, the second against the seventh, the third against the sixth and the fourth against the fifth. Teams were allowed to use six players during the team matches, selecting four of them in the two morning foursome games and five players in to the afternoon single games. Teams knocked out after the quarter finals played one foursome game and four single games in each of their remaining matches. Extra holes were played in games that were all square after 18 holes. However, if the result of the team match was already decided, undecided games were declared halved.

== Teams ==
16 nation teams contested the event. Each team consisted of six players.

=== Qualified teams ===
The top 13 teams from the 2024 European Amateur Team Championship, including host nation Ireland

Place	Country
1	Sweden
2	Netherlands
3	Germany
4	Estonia
5	France
6	Italy
7	England
8	Spain
9	Finland
10	Switzerland
11	Denmark
12	Ireland
13	Portugal

The three top teams from the 2024 European Amateur Team Championship Division 2

Place	Country
1	Czech Republic
2	Iceland
3	Poland

Players in the teams
Country	Players
Denmark	Magnus Becker Frederiksen, Claes Borregaard, Kristian Hjorth Bressum, Mads Heller, Oscar Holm Bredkjær, Mads Viemose Larsen
Czech Republic	Matěj Bača, Timotej Formánek, Jakub Hejlek, Filip Jakubčík, Václav Tichý, Matyáš Vysušil
England	Eliot Baker, Charlie Forster, Daniel Hayes, Luke Poulter, Harley Smith, Tyler Weaver
Estonia	Carl Enn Hellat, Kevin Christopher Jegers, Ralf Johan Kivi, Richard Teder, Markus Varjun, Mattias Varjun
Finland	Topi Lindström, Niilo Mäki-Petäjä, Sakke Siltala, Viggo Talasmäki, Veikka Viskari, Ville Virkkala
France	Louis Anceaux, Paul Beauvy, Oscar Couilleau, Hugo Le Goff, Alexis Leray, Ugo Malcor
Germany	Wolfgang Glawe, Tom Haberer, Finn Koelle, Yannick Malik, Peer Wernicke, Tim Wiedemeyer
Iceland	Böðvar Bragi Pálsson, Tómas Eiríksson Hjaltested, Veigar Heiðarsson, Dagbjartur Sigurbrandsson, Logi Sigurðsson, Gunnlaugur Árni Sveinsson
Ireland	John Doyle, Stuart Grehan, Thomas Higgins, Matthew McClean, Caolan Rafferty, Gavin Tiernan
Italy	Giovanni Binaghi, Riccardo Fantinelli, Michele Ferrero, Biagio Gagliardi, Julien Paltrinieri, Filippo Ponzano
Netherlands	Loran Appel, Nathan Hooft, Jack Ingham, Benjamin Reuter, Nevill Ruiter, Scott Woltering
Poland	Maksymilian Bialy, Jan Branicki, Antoni Hawkins, Luczkak Konstanty, Kamil Nowak, Jan Rybczynski
Portugal	Miguel Cardoso, Francisco Matos Coelho, José Miguel Franco de Sousa, João Miguel Pereira, João Teixeira e Costa, Pedro Cruz Silva
Spain	Pablo Alperi, Alejandro De Castro, Sergio Jimenez, Jaime Montojo, Alvaro Pastor, Josep Maria Serra
Sweden	Jakob Melin, Alfons Bondesson, Hugo Thyr, Albert Hansson, Filip Fahlberg Johnsson, Daniel Svärd
Switzerland	Mischa Candinas, Patrick Foley, Joshua Hess, Tom Mao, Max Schliesing, Filippo Serra

== Winners ==
Leader of the opening 36-hole competition was team England, with a 44-under-par score of 676, 19 strokes ahead of host team Ireland, a combined team of the Republic of Ireland and Northern Ireland. There was no official award for the lowest individual score, but individual leader was Tyler Weaver, England, with a 20-under-par score of 132, one stroke ahead of fellow countryman Charlie Foster.

Defending champion team Sweden was placed 14th after the first qualifying round, seven strokes behind the 8th placed team, but advanced to 7th after the final qualifying round and inside the eight teams to play in flight A for the medals.

Team Italy won the championship, there first title since 1999, after beating Team Denmark 6.5-0.5 in the final.

Czech Republic and Portugal finished 15th and 16th, why they were moved to compete in Division II next year. Team Estonia finished 14th, but was automatically qualified for the 2026 championship as host nation.

Belgium and Wales earned promotion to participate in next years championship after finishing first and second in Division II, taking place in Hungary during the same period of time.

== Results ==
Qualification round

Team standings after first round
Place	Country	Score	To par
1	England	340	−20
2	Iceland	347	−13
3	Ireland	349	−11
4	Germany	349	−11
5	Denmark	350	−10
6	Italy	353	−7
7	Spain	355	−5
8	France	358	−2
9	Estonia	359	−1
10	Switzerland	359	−1
11	Netherlands	360	E
12	Finland	362	+2
13	Czech Republic	363	+3
14	Sweden	365	+5
15	Portugal	366	+6
16	Poland	382	+22

Team standings after final qualification round
Place	Country	Score	To par
1	England	340-336=676	−44
2	Ireland	349-346=695	−25
3	Denmark*	350-346=696	−24
4	Italy	353-343=696	−24
5	France	358-345=703	−17
6	Germany	349-357=706	−14
7	Sweden	365-343=708	−12
8	Finland	362-348=710	−10
9	Czech Republic*	363-350=713	−7
10	Spain	355-358=713	−7
11	Iceland	347-367=714	−6
12	Estonia*	359-356=715	−5
13	Switzerland	359-356=715	−5
14	Netherlands	360-364=724	+4
15	Portugal	366-360=726	+6
16	Poland	382-363=745	+25

* Note: In the event of a tie the order was determined by the
best of the non-counting scores in each of the tied teams.

Individual leaders
Place	Player	Country	Score	To par
1	Tyler Weaver	England	69-63=132	−12
2	Charlie Forster	England	65-68=133	−11
T3	Ricardo Fantinelli	Italy	69-65=134	−10
T3	Biagio Gagliardi	Italy	67-67=134	−10
T5	Eliot Baker	England	69-66=135	−9
T5	Kristian Hjort Bressum	Denmark	66-69=135	−9
T5	Peer Wernicke	Germany	67-68=135	−9
8	Stuart Grehan	Ireland	71-65=136	−8
T9	Paul Beauvy	France	70-67=137	−7
T9	Oscar Holm Bredkjær	Denmark	68-69=137	−7
T9	Alexis Leray	France	70-67=137	−7

Note: There was no official award for the lowest individual score.

Flight A

Bracket

Quarter finals
England	6
Finland	1
Italy	4.5
France	2.5
Denmark	4.5
Germany	2.5
Ireland	5
Sweden	2

Semi finals
Italy	5.5
England	1.5
Denmark	4
Ireland	3

Final
Italy	6.5
Denmark	0.5
Bronze match
England	4
Ireland	3

Elimination matches
Finland	3
France	2
Sweden	3
Germany	2

Match for 5th place
Sweden	3
Finland	2
Match for 7th place
France	4.5
Germany	0.5

Final games
Italy	Denmark
6.5	0.5
Binaghi/Gagliardi 5 & 4	Heller/Larsen
Ponzano/Ferrero 3 & 2	Hjort Bressum/Holm Bredkjær
Riccardo Fantinelli 2 & 1	Mads Heller
Giovanni Binaghi 2 & 1	Oscar Holm Bredkjær
Biagio Gagliardi AS *	Claes Borregaard AS *
Michele Ferrero 3 & 2	Andreas Foght
Filippo Ponzano 4 & 3	Kristian Hjort Bressum

* Note: Game declared halved, since team match already decided.

Flight B

Bracket

Round 1
Poland	3
Czech Republic	2
Switzerland	3
Estonia	2
Netherlands	3.5
Iceland	1.5
Spain	4.5
Portugal	0.5

Round 2
Switzerland	4
Poland	1
Netherlands	4
Spain	1

Match for 9th place
Switzerland	3
Netherlands	2
Match for 11th place
Poland	3
Spain	2

Elimination matches
Estonia	3
Czech Republic	2
Iceland	3
Portugal	2

Match for 13th place
Iceland	3.5
Estonia	1.5
Match for 15th place
Czech Republic	4
Portugal	1

Final standings
Place	Country
1st place, gold medalist(s)	Italy
2nd place, silver medalist(s)	Denmark
3rd place, bronze medalist(s)	England
4	Ireland
5	Sweden
6	Finland
7	France
8	Germany
9	Switzerland
10	Netherlands
11	Poland
12	Spain
13	Iceland
14	Estonia
15	Czech Republic
16	Portugal

== See also ==
- Eisenhower Trophy – biennial world amateur team golf championship for men organized by the International Golf Federation.
- European Amateur Championship – European amateur individual golf championship for men organised by the European Golf Association.
- European Ladies' Team Championship – European amateur team golf championship for women organised by the European Golf Association.
