= World University Golf Championship =

Tournament information
- Established: 1986
- Organized by: FISU

The World University Golf Championship is a biennial competition sponsored by the International University Sports Federation (FISU), which was first held in October 1986 at the Molas Golf Club in Cagliari, Italy.

== Competitions ==
Year	Country	City	Countries	Ref
1986	Italy	Cagliari	7	
1988	Italy	Cagliari	9	
1990	France	La Grande-Motte	14	
1992	Spain	Palma de Mallorca	14	
1994	Spain	San Lorenzo	15	
1996	Switzerland	Lausanne	21	
1998	South Africa	Southbroom	13	
2000	United Kingdom	Coleraine	15	
2002	Taiwan	Taoyuan	13	
2004	Thailand	Nakhon Ratchasima	14	
2006	Italy	Turin	17	
2007	Thailand	Bangkok	14	
2008	South Africa	Sun City	18	
2010	Spain	Málaga	21	
2011	China	Shenzhen	21	
2012	Czech Republic	Liberec	19	
2014	Switzerland	Crans-Montana	22	
2015	South Korea	Gwangju	21	
2016	France	Brive-la-Gaillarde	23	
2017	Taiwan	Taoyuan	33	
2018	Philippines	Lubao, Pampanga	13	
2020	Canceled due to the COVID-19 pandemic			
2022	Italy	Fiano	16	
2024	Finland	Seinäjoki	20	

== Results ==
=== Men's individual ===
Year	Gold	Silver	Bronze
1986	(United States) Rob Odom	(Italy) Enrico Nistri	(France) Olivier Dupas
1988	(United States) Lee Porter	(United Kingdom) Dean Spriddle	(France) Grégoire Brizay
1990	(France) Fabrice Tarnaud	(Italy) Federico Bisazza	(Austria) Maximilian Baltl
1992	(Spain) Ignacio Garrido	(France) Grégoire Brizay	(Spain) Alberto Durban
1994	(Spain) Francisco de Pablo	(Italy) Niccolo Bisazza	(Italy) Matteo Natoli (Chinese Taipei) Hong Chia-yuh
1996	(Spain) Álvaro Salto	(Chinese Taipei) Hong Chia-yuh	(Chinese Taipei) Kao Bo-song
1998	(United States) James Jones	(United States) Kyle Blackman	(United States) John Horton
2000	(Republic of Ireland) Graeme McDowell	(United States) Nicklos Rousey	(United Kingdom) Simon Robinson
2002	(Republic of Ireland) Justin Kehoe	(Switzerland) Martin Rominger	(Japan) Riki Ikeda
2004	(Republic of Ireland) Darren Crowe	(South Africa) Mark Mahoney	(United States) Tyler Cummins (Japan) Kunishiro Kamii
2006	(Japan) Yuta Ikeda	(Chinese Taipei) Chiang Chen-chih	(United States) Aaron Manning
2008	(Italy) Leonardo Motta	(Japan) Yuki Usami	(United Kingdom) Andy Shakespear
2010	(Spain) Gerard Piris	(Spain) Carlos Pigem	(South Korea) Park Sung-heak
2012	(Spain) Carlos Pigem	(United Kingdom) David Booth (Spain) Juan Sarasti	—N/a
2014	(Mexico) Gerardo Ruiz	(Malaysia) Gavin Green	(Spain) Emilio Cuartero (Spain) Daniel Berna
2016	(Republic of Ireland) Robin Dawson	(China) Xuewem Luo	(Chinese Taipei) Yeh Yu-chen
2018	(Japan) Daiki Imano	(Japan) Yuto Katsuragawa	(Switzerland) Henry Tschopp
2022	(South Korea) Jang Yu-bin	(Japan) Ryunosuke Furukawa	(Italy) Giovanni Manzoni
2024	(Spain) Pablo Ereño	(Spain) Albert Boneta	(France) Louis Paulus

=== Women's individual ===
Year	Gold	Silver	Bronze
1986	(United States) Kay Cockerill	(United States) Lee Ann Hammack (Italy) Caterina Quintarelli	—N/a
1988	(United States) Cissye Meeks	(United States) Sarah LeBrun	(United Kingdom) Catriona Lambert
1990	(France) Delphine Bourson	(United States) Jean Zedlitz	(United Kingdom) Alison MacDonald
1992	(United Kingdom) Kirsty Speak	(Spain) Estefania Knuth	(United States) Deb Doniger
1994	(United States) Nicola Cooper	(United States) Kim O'Connor	(Italy) Maria Paola Casati
1996	(United States) Jenny Chuasiriporn	(South Korea) Kang Soo-yun	(South Korea) Kim Kyung-sook
1998	(Chinese Taipei) Wei Jun-jye	(France) Gwladys Nocera	(Chinese Taipei) Lin Yu-ping
2000	(United Kingdom) Laura Moffat	(United States) Sarah Sasse	(United Kingdom) Vikki Laing
2002	(Chinese Taipei) Yu Pei-lin	(United States) Allison Fouch	(Japan) Kyoko Furuya
2004	(United States) Katie Futcher	(Thailand) Porani Chutichai	(United States) Denise Knaebel
2006	(United States) Stacy Lewis	(Russia) Maria Verchenova	(Japan) Erina Hara
2008	(France) Marion Ricordeau	(United States) Katie Tewell	(Italy) Caroline Rominger
2010	(United States) Catherine O'Donnell	(France) Morgane Bazin de Jessey	(Chinese Taipei) Hsu Ke-hui
2012	(Spain) Camilla Hedberg	(United States) Amy Anderson	(United States) Caroline Powers
2014	(Hong Kong) Tiffany Chan	(Spain) Marta Sanz Barrio	(Spain) Silvia Bañón
2016	(Czech Republic) Karolína Vlčková	(Czech Republic) Marie Luňáčková	(Czech Republic) Kateřina Vlašínová
2018	(South Korea) Ma Da-som	(South Korea) Kang Min-ji	(South Korea) Jung Son-yeon
2022	(Spain) Carla Tejedo	(Spain) Carolina López-Chacarra	(Italy) Caterina Don
2024	(Italy) Anna Zanusso	(South Korea) Choi Jung-won	(Spain) Daniela Campillo

=== Men's team ===
Year	Gold	Silver	Bronze
1986	Italy (ITA)	United States (USA)	Great Britain (GBR)
1988	United States (USA)	Great Britain (GBR); France (FRA)	—N/a
1990	Italy (ITA)	France (FRA)	Great Britain (GBR)
1992	Spain (ESP)	United States (USA)	France (FRA)
1994	Spain (ESP)	South Africa (ZAF); Italy (ITA)	—N/a
1996	United States (USA)	Chinese Taipei (TPE)	Great Britain (GBR)
1998	United States (USA)	France (FRA); Great Britain (GBR)	—N/a
2000	Ireland (IRL)	Great Britain (GBR)	Spain (ESP)
2002	Japan (JPN)	Ireland (IRL)	Switzerland (CHE)
2004	South Africa (ZAF)	Japan (JPN)	United States (USA)
2006	Japan (JPN)	United States (USA)	Great Britain (GBR)
2008			
2010	South Korea (KOR)	Japan (JPN)	Spain (ESP)
2012	Spain (ESP)	Great Britain (GBR)	Ireland (IRL)
2014	Spain (ESP)	Japan (JPN)	Canada (CAN); Ireland (IRL)
2016	France (FRA)	Ireland (IRL)	Chinese Taipei (TPE)
2018	Japan (JPN)	South Korea (KOR)	Chinese Taipei (TPE)
2022	Japan (JPN)	South Korea (KOR)	Italy (ITA)
2024	Spain (ESP)	Canada (CAN)	Hong Kong (HKG); Japan (JPN)

=== Women's team ===
Year	Gold	Silver	Bronze
1986	United States (USA)	Great Britain (GBR)	Italy (ITA)
1988	United States (USA)	Great Britain (GBR)	Italy (ITA)
1990	France (FRA)	United States (USA)	Italy (ITA)
1992	Spain (ESP)	Great Britain (GBR)	Italy (ITA)
1994	United States (USA)	Italy (ITA)	France (FRA)
1996	United States (USA)	South Korea (KOR)	Spain (ESP)
1998	Chinese Taipei (TPE)	France (FRA)	Spain (ESP)
2000	Great Britain (GBR)	United States (USA)	Spain (ESP)
2002	Chinese Taipei (TPE)	Japan (JPN)	United States (USA)
2004	United States (USA)	Thailand (THA)	Chinese Taipei (TPE)
2006	United States (USA)	Japan (JPN)	Russia (RUS)
2008			
2010	France (FRA)	Chinese Taipei (TPE)	United States (USA)
2012	Spain (ESP)	United States (USA)	Germany (GER)
2014	Spain (ESP)	United States (USA)	Japan (JPN)
2016	Czech Republic (CZE)	Chinese Taipei (TPE)	United States (USA)
2018	South Korea (KOR)	France (FRA)	Chinese Taipei (TPE)
2022	Spain (ESP)	Chinese Taipei (TPE)	Japan (JPN)
2024	Spain (ESP)	South Korea (KOR); Italy (ITA)	

== See also ==
- Golf at the Summer Universiade
