= 2025 Alps Tour =

Golf tour season

2025 Alps Tour season
- Duration: 19 February 2025 – 18 October 2025
- Number of official events: 18
- Most wins: (Spain) Javier Barcos (2) (Spain) Álvaro Hernández Cabezuela (2) (Italy) Jacopo Vecchi Fossa (2) (Spain) Asier Aguirre Izcue (2) (Italy) Andrea Romano (2)
- Order of Merit: (Spain) Javier Barcos

The 2025 Alps Tour was the 25th season of the Alps Tour, a third-tier golf tour recognised by the European Tour.

== Schedule ==
The following table lists official events during the 2025 season.

Date	Tournament	Host country	Purse (€)	Winner (Note: The number in brackets after each winner's name is the number of Alps Tour events they had won up to and including that tournament. It is rare for someone to accumulate many wins on the Alps Tour as success at this level usually leads to promotion to the Challenge Tour.)	OWGR points
21 Feb	Ein Bay Open	Egypt	42,500	(Switzerland) Luca Galliano (1)	1.08
26 Feb	Red Sea Little Venice Open	Egypt	42,500	(Spain) Álvaro Hernández Cabezuela (1)	1.12
3 Mar	New Giza Open	Egypt	42,500	(Spain) Javier Barcos (1)	1.19
22 Mar	Tunisian Golf Open	Tunisia	47,500	(Spain) Álvaro Hernández Cabezuela (2)	1.58
26 Mar	La Cigale Golf Open	Tunisia	47,500	(Spain) Rocco Repetto (1)	1.48
9 May	Memorial Giorgio Bordoni	Italy	42,500	(Spain) Asier Aguirre Izcue (1)	1.54
17 May	Gösser Open	Austria	42,500	(Spain) Jorge Maicas (1)	1.74
24 May	Lacanau Alps Open	France	47,500	(Spain) Javier Calles Roman (1)	1.83
6 Jun	Alps de Andalucía-Roquetas de Mar	Spain	42,500	(Italy) Andrea Romano (1)	1.54
15 Jun	Open de la Mirabelle d'Or	France	42,500	(Italy) Jacopo Vecchi Fossa (4)	1.39
28 Jun	Aravell Golf Andorra Open	Spain	42,500	(Netherlands) Jerry Ji (1)	1.28
5 Jul	Fred Olsen Alps de La Gomera	Spain	42,500	(Italy) Andrea Romano (2)	1.23
11 Jul	Alps de Las Castillas	Spain	42,500	(Spain) Antonio Hortal (1)	1.50
27 Jul	Biarritz Cup	France	47,500	(France) Victor Dubuisson (n/a)	1.43
6 Sep	Longwy Alps Open	France	47,500	(Spain) Javier Barcos (2)	1.22
13 Sep	Hauts de France – Pas de Calais Golf Open	France	40,000	(France) Quentin Debove (1)	1.05
11 Oct	Parma Alps Open	Italy	42,500	(Italy) Jacopo Vecchi Fossa (5)	1.22
18 Oct	Regione Lazio Alps Tour Grand Final	Italy	55,000	(Spain) Asier Aguirre Izcue (2)	0.94

== Order of Merit ==
The Order of Merit was based on tournament results during the season, calculated using a points-based system. The top five players on the Order of Merit (not otherwise exempt) earned status to play on the 2026 Challenge Tour (HotelPlanner Tour).

Position	Player	Points	Status earned
1	(Spain) Javier Barcos	38,699	Promoted to Challenge Tour
2	(Italy) Jacopo Vecchi Fossa	32,570	Promoted to Challenge Tour
3	(Spain) Asier Aguirre Izcue	30,772	Promoted to Challenge Tour
4	(France) Quentin Debove	28,093	Qualified for European Tour (Top 20 in Q School)
5	(Republic of Ireland) Ronan Mullarney	23,306	Promoted to Challenge Tour
6	(Netherlands) Jerry Ji	22,686	Promoted to Challenge Tour
7	(Spain) Javier Calles Roman	22,278	
8	(Spain) Álvaro Hernández Cabezuela	21,753	
9	(Spain) Jorge Maicas	19,986	
10	(Italy) Andrea Romano	19,910	
