= Mathilde Hjort Bressum =

Danish politician (born 1998)

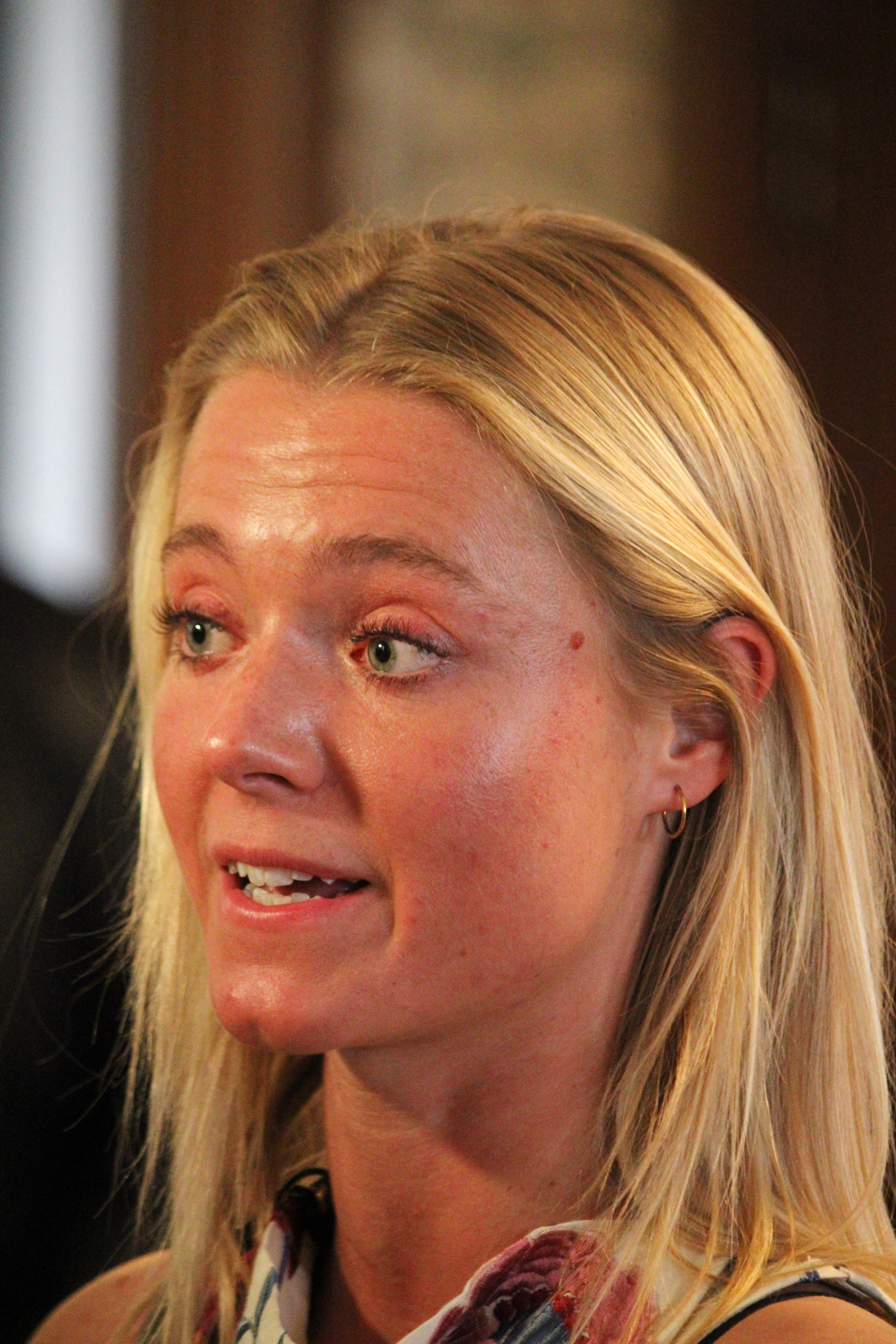
- Bressum in 2026

Member of the Folketing
- Incumbent
- Assumed office 24 March 2026
- Constituency: East Jutland

Personal details
- Born: 5 October 1998 (age 28) Randers, Denmark
- Party: Venstre

Mathilde Hjort Bressum (born 5 October 1998) is a Danish politician who was elected member of the Folketing in 2026. She has been a municipal councillor of Aarhus since 2022.

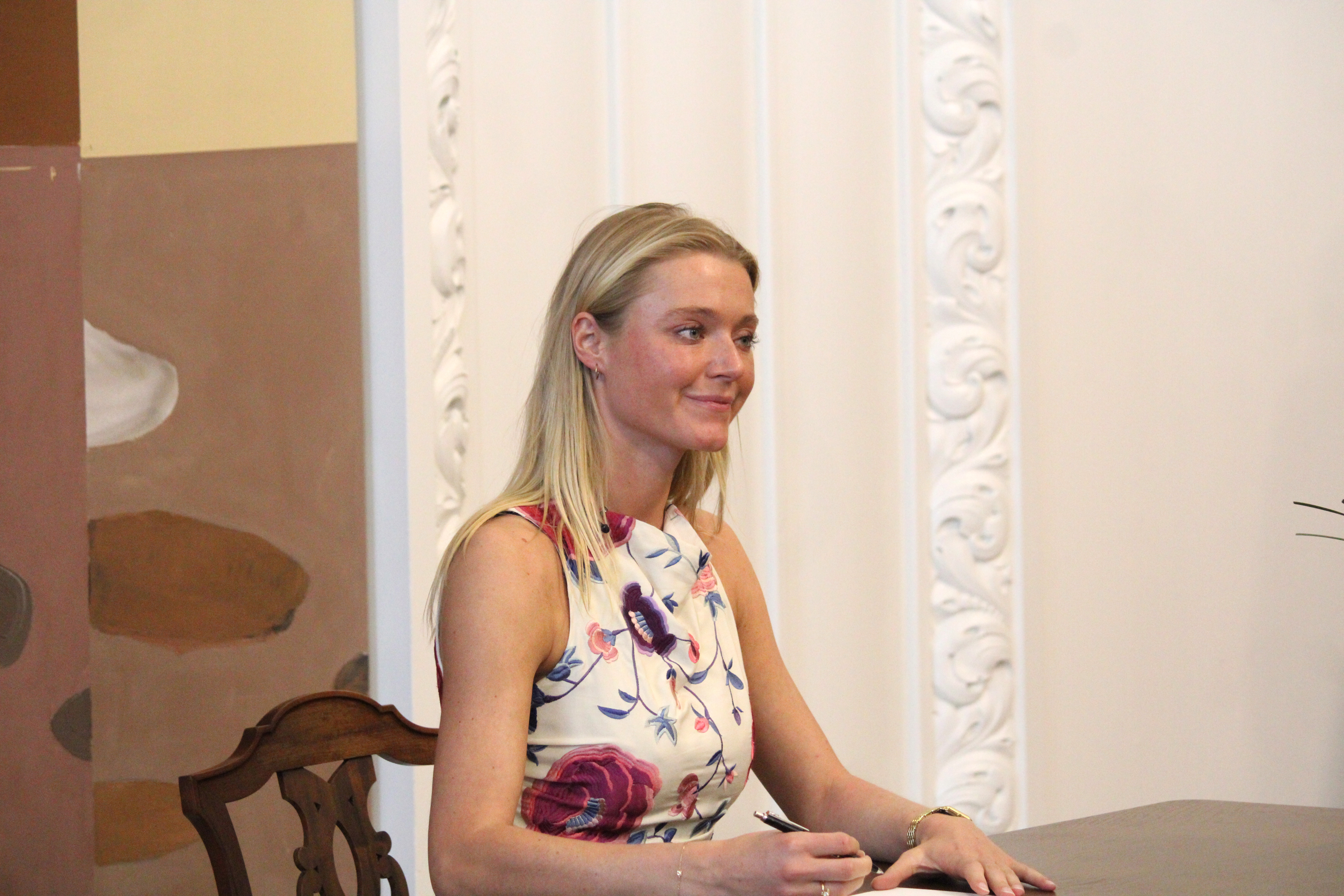
Bressum signing a pledge to uphold the Danish Constitution at Christiansborg, 14 April 2026

== Background ==
Bressum received a bachelor's degree in 2021 and a master's degree in 2024 from Aarhus University, both in political science. She was a stagiaire for Morten Løkkegaard from 2022 to 2023, and worked as a communications officer for Arla Foods from 2024 to 2026.

== Personal life ==
Bressum was born in Randers on 5 October 1998. She is married to Rasmus Viggers. Her brother Kristian Hjort Bressum is a professional golfer.
