= Tyler Weaver =

English golfer (born 2004)

Personal information
- Nationality: England
- Born: 2004 (age 21–22) Bury St Edmunds, Suffolk, England
- Height: 5 ft 11 in (180 cm)

Career
- Sport: Golf
- College: Florida State University
- Status: Amateur

Best results in major championships
- Masters Tournament: DNP
- PGA Championship: DNP
- U.S. Open: CUT: 2025
- The Open Championship: DNP

Achievements and awards
- ACC Freshman of the Year: 2025
- European Amateur Golfer of the Year: 2026

Tyler Weaver (born 2004) is an English amateur golfer who currently plays on the Florida State Seminoles men's golf team.

== Early life ==
Weaver was born in Bury St Edmunds, Suffolk and grew up in Newmarket, both near Cambridge. He and his brother learnt to play golf at Links Golf Club in Newmarket, within view of Newmarket Racecourse.

== Amateur career ==
Weaver had a successful amateur career and in 2022 he was runner-up at the Sir Henry Cooper Junior Masters and won the English Under-18 Amateur Stroke Play Championship. In 2023, he won the Carris Trophy for the English Boys' Open Amateur Stroke Play Championship, and was runner-up at the English Amateur. Weaver helped England win silver at the 2022 European Boys' Team Championship in Germany, and win bronze at the 2025 European Amateur Team Championship, where he set the Killarney Golf & Fishing Club amateur course record with a 63.

Weaver enrolled at Florida State University in 2024. He went on to earn ACC Freshman of the Year honours thanks to a runner-up finish at the 2024 Seminole Intercollegiate and a season scoring average of 71.71. As a sophomore in 2025, he was runner-up at the ACC Championship and won the Cabo Collegiate, which earned him an invitation to the World Wide Technology Championship on the PGA Tour.

Weaver made his major debut at the 2025 U.S. Open at Oakmont Country Club where he carded rounds of 75 and 74 to narrowly miss the cut. He qualified by finishing tied 3rd in the 84-man field at Piedmont Driving Club in Atlanta, Georgia.

He was a part of the International team which defeated Team USA at the 2025 Arnold Palmer Cup, and helped defeat the U.S. again at the 2026 Walker Cup at Lahinch Golf Club in Ireland.

In 2026, Weaver rose to second in the World Amateur Golf Rankings and number one in Europe just ahead of Luke Poulter and Tim Wiedemeyer, to be crowned European Amateur Golfer of the Year by the EGA.

== Personal life ==
Weaver's father Jason is a professional horse-racing jockey with over 1,000 wins in a 14-year career, and has worked as a presenter on Sky Sports Racing and ITV Racing. His grandfather Eric was a professional footballer who played for a number of clubs, including Notts County and Swindon Town.

== Amateur wins ==
- 2021 BJGT Summer Cup
- 2022 Lagonda Trophy, English Under 18 Amateur Stroke Play Championship
- 2023 English Boys' Open Amateur Stroke Play Championship (Carris Trophy)
- 2025 Cabo Collegiate
- 2026 Valspar Collegiate Invitational

== Results in major championships ==
Tournament	2025
Masters Tournament	
PGA Championship	
U.S. Open	CUT
The Open Championship	

Did not play

CUT = missed the half-way cut

== Team appearances ==
Amateur

- European Boys' Team Championship (representing England): 2022, 2023
- Jacques Léglise Trophy (representing Great Britain & Ireland): 2022, 2023
- Women's and Men's Home Internationals (representing England): 2022 (winners), 2023 (winners)
- Junior Golf World Cup (representing England): 2023
- Eisenhower Trophy (representing England): 2023, 2025
- European Amateur Team Championship (representing England): 2024, 2025
- St Andrews Trophy (representing Great Britain & Ireland): 2025 (winners)
- Arnold Palmer Cup (representing International): 2025 (winners)
- Walker Cup (representing Great Britain & Ireland): 2025, 2026 (winners)
