= Lev Grinberg =

Ukrainian golfer (born 2007)

Personal information
- Nationality: Ukraine (until 2026); France (from 2026)
- Born: 17 November 2007 (age 19) Kyiv, Ukraine

Career
- Sport: Golf
- Status: Amateur

Best results in major championships
- Masters Tournament: DNP
- PGA Championship: DNP
- U.S. Open: DNP
- The Open Championship: CUT: 2026

Lev Grinberg (born 17 November 2007) is a Ukrainian-French amateur golfer. Born in Ukraine, he became a French national when he turned 18. In 2022, he made the cut in a European Tour event at only 14 years old, and in 2023 he helped Europe win the Jacques Léglise Trophy and Junior Ryder Cup.

== Early life ==
Grinberg was born in Kyiv and started playing golf at age of five at Kozyn Golf & Country Club, where he won his first junior club competitions as a six year old. He moved to Belgium with his father Illya, a former badminton player, and came to represent Rinkven International Golf Club. He later moved to France.

== Amateur career ==
Grinberg entered his first European Tour event in May 2022, at the Soudal Open at Rinkven, where he became the youngest to ever to make the cut in a Europe-based event (Note: Guan Tianlang of China made the cut at the 2013 Masters Tournament at the age of 14 years and 169 days, only a few weeks younger than Grinberg.) on the European Tour, at 14 years, six months and six days. At 16, he was in contention at the 2024 FedEx Open de France at Le Golf National after an opening round of 66, a shot off the lead, and ultimately tied for 37th and was low amateur.

In amateur events, Grinberg was runner-up at the 2022 Belgian International Amateur Championship behind Nathan Cossement, and tied 4th at the 2023 Portuguese International Amateur Championship. He was runner-up at the 2024 Junior PGA Championship and the 2025 German Boys Open. In 2024, Grinberg reached the round of 16 at both the U.S. Junior Amateur and The Amateur Championship, and finished 4th at the South Beach International Amateur, five strokes behind winner Miles Russell.

Grinberg has successfully represented Europe in international team matches, and has won the Jacques Léglise Trophy twice and the 2023 Junior Ryder Cup, where he contributed to the team's dominant victory. In 2025, he became a brand ambassador for TaylorMade.

== Amateur wins ==
- 2022 Grand Prix de Waterloo, Federal Tour 54 Holes
- 2024 Grand Prix de Merignies
- 2026 St Andrews Links Trophy

== Results in major championships ==
Tournament	2026
Masters Tournament	
PGA Championship	
U.S. Open	
The Open Championship	CUT

Did not play

CUT = missed the half-way cut

== Team appearances ==
Amateur

- Eisenhower Trophy (representing Ukraine): 2022
- Jacques Léglise Trophy (representing Continental Europe): 2023 (winners), 2024 (winners), 2025 (winners)
- Junior Ryder Cup (representing Europe): 2023 (winners), 2025
- Bonallack Trophy (representing Europe): 2025
- European Amateur Team Championship (representing France): 2026
