= Cameron Adam =

Scottish professional golfer (born 2003)

Personal information
- Nationality: Scotland
- Born: 6 July 2003 (age 23) Edinburgh, Scotland
- Height: 6 ft 2 in (188 cm)
- Weight: 165 lb (75 kg)

Career
- Sport: Golf
- College: Northwestern University
- Turned professional: 2025
- Current tour: European Tour

Best results in major championships
- Masters Tournament: DNP
- PGA Championship: DNP
- U.S. Open: DNP
- The Open Championship: CUT: 2025

Cameron Adam (born 6 July 2003) is a Scottish professional golfer who plays on the European Tour.

== Early life and amateur career ==
Adam was born in Edinburgh and raised in Fife. He plays left-handed just like his fellow Scot and mentor Robert MacIntyre.

In 2019, Adam was runner-up at the English Boys' Under 16 Open Amateur Stroke Play Championship for the McGregor Trophy, and won the Scottish Boys U16 Open Championship. He captured the Scottish Amateur in 2023 and the St Andrews Links Trophy in 2025.

Adam was on the national team and captained the Great Britain & Ireland team at the 2021 Jacques Léglise Trophy at Falsterbo Golf Club in Sweden, and won the 2025 St Andrews Trophy at Real Club de la Puerta de Hierro in Spain with the GB&I team. He played in the 2025 Walker Cup, and his team tied for 7th at the 2025 Eisenhower Trophy in Singapore.

Adam attended Northwestern University from 2021 to 2025 and played with the Northwestern Wildcats men's golf team.

In 2025 he rose to 17th in the World Amateur Golf Ranking and earned a start at the 2025 Open Championship at Royal Portrush as winner of the Open Amateur Series. A month later he made his European Tour debut in the Betfred British Masters, where he was tied 5th and in contention for the title with one round to play at The Belfry, ultimately tying for 19th.

== Professional career ==
Adam secured membership of the 2026 European Tour by topping the 2025 Global Amateur Pathway ranking, following Ding Wenyi in the inaugural 2024 series.

He recorded his first top-10 finish at the 2026 Magical Kenya Open.

== Amateur wins ==
- 2019 Junior Tour Royal Dornoch, Scottish Boys U16 Open Championship
- 2020 Faldo Series England North Championship
- 2023 Scottish Amateur
- 2024 The Clerico
- 2025 St Andrews Links Trophy

== Results in major championships ==
Tournament	2025
Masters Tournament	
U.S. Open	
The Open Championship	CUT
PGA Championship	

Did not play

CUT = missed the half-way cut

== Team appearances ==
Amateur

- European Young Masters (representing Scotland): 2019
- Boys Home Internationals (representing Scotland): 2019
- Girls and Boys Home Internationals (representing Scotland): 2021
- Jacques Léglise Trophy (representing Great Britain & Ireland): 2021
- Women's and Men's Home Internationals (representing Scotland): 2024
- European Amateur Team Championship (representing Scotland): 2024
- Spirit International Amateur (representing Scotland): 2024
- St Andrews Trophy (representing Great Britain & Ireland): 2025 (winners)
- Walker Cup (representing Great Britain & Ireland): 2025
- Eisenhower Trophy (representing Scotland): 2025
