= 2026 European Amateur Team Championship =

Golf competition

Tournament information
- Dates: 7–11 July 2026
- Location: Tallinn, Estonia; 59.47°N 25.14°E
- Course: Estonian Golf & Country Club (Sea Course)
- Organized by: European Golf Association
- Format: Qualification round: 36 holes stroke play Knock-out match-play

Statistics
- Par: 72
- Length: 7,113 yards (6,504 m)
- Field: 16 teams 96 players

Champion
- Ireland; John Doyle, Stuart Grehan,Thomas Higgins, Matthew McClean, Caolan Rafferty, Gavin Tiernan
- Qualification round: 706 (−14); Final match: 4–3
- Location in Europe Location in Estonia

The 2026 European Amateur Team Championship took place 7–11 July at the Estonian Golf & Country Club, Tallinn, Estonia. It was the 43rd men's golf European Amateur Team Championship.

At the same time, the 2026 European Amateur Team Championship Division 2 tournament took place in Costa Navarino, Greece, with nine nation teams competing, with a chance to qualify for the 2027 tournament.

== Venue ==
The hosting club, Estonian Golf & Country Club, was founded in 2006. Its Sea Course, located 25 kilometers east of the city center of Tallinn, had previously hosted the European Amateur Championship in 2016 when Viktor Hovland set a new course record with a 9-under-par-round of 63.

=== Course layout ===
Tee location on each hole varied so specified hole length is approximate.

Hole	Meters	Par	Hole	Meters	Par
1	530	5	10	156	3
2	350	4	11	402	4
3	352	4	12	340	4
4	444	4	13	380	4
5	158	3	14	360	4
6	520	5	15	524	5
7	406	4	16	338	4
8	192	3	17	180	3
9	346	4	18	526	5
Out	3,298	36	In	3,206	36
Source:		Total		6,504	72

== Format ==
Each team consisted of six players. On the first two days each player played 18 holes of stroke play each day. The lowest five scores from each team's six players counted to the team total each day.

The eight best teams formed flight A, in knock-out match-play over the following three days. The teams were seeded based on their positions after the stroke play. The first placed team was drawn to play the quarter final against the eight placed team, the second against the seventh, the third against the sixth and the fourth against the fifth. Teams were allowed to use six players during each team match, selecting four of them in two morning foursome games and five players in to the afternoon single games. In the thursday quarterfinals, only one foursome game and four single games were played in each match.

The teams outside the top eight in the stroke-play stage formed flight B, also played knock-out match-play, with one foursome game and four single games in each match, to decide their final positions.

Extra holes were played in games that were all square after 18 holes. However, if the result of the team match was already decided, undecided games were declared halved.

== Teams ==
16 nation teams contested the event. Each team consisted of six players.

=== Qualified teams ===
- The top 13 teams from the 2025 European Amateur Team Championship

Place	Nation
1	Italy
2	Denmark
3	England
4	Ireland
5	Sweden
6	Finland
7	France
8	Germany
9	Switzerland
10	Netherlands
11	Poland
12	Spain
13	Iceland

- Host nation

Nation
Estonia

- The two top teams from the 2025 European Amateur Team Championship Division 2

Place	Nation
1	Belgium
2	Wales

Players in the teams
Nation team	Players
Belgium	Liam Bentein, Anthony De Schutter, Arthur Estas, Léopold Isserentant, James Skeet, Jarno Tollenaire
Denmark	Magnus Becker Frederiksen, Oscar Valdemar Holm Bredkjær, Mikkel Tingsted Blum, Daniel Toft Hansen, Andreas Trym Dam Fogth, Mads Viemose Larsen
England	Eliot Baker, Seb Cave, Sam Easterbrook, Lewy Hayward, Tom Osborne, Harley Smith
Estonia	Carl Hellat, Kevin Christopher Jegers, Ralf Johan Kivi, Richard Teder, Mattias Varjun, Markus Varjun
Finland	Topi Lindström, Niilo Mäki-Petäjä, Lauri Rosendahl, Sakke Siltala, Ville Virkkala, Veikka Viskari
France	Paul Beauvy, Arthur Carlier, Oscar Couilleau, Lev Grinberg, Hugo Le Goff, Ugo Malcor
Germany	Wolfgang Glawe, Tom Haberer, Finn Kölle, Emil Riegger, Tjelle Rieger, Carl Siemens
Iceland	Skúli Gunnar Ágústsson, Sigurður Bjarki Blumenstein, Veigar Heiðarsson, Tómas Eiríksson Hjaltested, Aron Emil Gunnarsson, Gunnlaugur Árni Sveinsson
Ireland	John Doyle, Stuart Grehan, Thomas Higgins, Matthew McClean, Caolan Rafferty, Gavin Tiernan
Italy	Giovanni Binaghi, Riccardo Fantinelli, Michele Ferrero, Biagio Andrea Gagliardi, Francesco Petrangeli, Filippo Ponzano
Netherlands	Bjorn Driessen, Denny Kloeth, Guus Lafeber, Melvin Muller, Nevill Ruiter, Scott Woltering
Poland	Konrad Bargenda, Marcin Bogusz, Tristan Kolasinski, Konstanty Luczak, Jan Rybczynski, Kamil Sikora
Spain	Alejandro De Castro, Sergio Jimenez Romero, Bruno Marques, Jorge Martin Sampedro, Jaime Montojo, Alvaro Pastor
Sweden	Alfons Bondesson, Wilmer Ederö, Filip Fahlberg Johnsson, Simon Hovdal, Jakob Melin, Wilhelm Ryding
Switzerland	Alexander Brand, Mischa Candinas, Patrick Foley, Tom Mao, Ben Steinmann, Miles Wennestam
Wales	Jonathan Bale, Tomi Bowen, Caolan Burford, Sean David, Alex James, Ioan Rowe

== Winners ==
Team Ireland won the championship, beating host nation Estonia in the final after kicking out defending champion team Italy in the semi finals. The final was decided on the green of the second extra hole in the last game between Thomas Higgins, Ireland and Kevin Jegers, Estonia, were Higgins won, despite hitting his tee shot in the water.

Spain, Denmark and Poland finished on positions 14–16 and were moved to Division II for 2027.

At the 2026 Division II tournament, team Czech Republic won ahead of Slovakia. Both nations qualified for the 2027 European Amateur Team Championship tournament, together with 2027 host nation Slovenia.

== Results ==
Qualification round

Team standings after final qualification round
Place	Country	Score	To par
1	Finland	351-342=693	−27
2	Netherlands	352-348=700	−20
3	France	354-350=704	−16
4	Ireland	382-344=706	−14
5	England	357-349=706	−14
6	Switzerland	353-354=707	−13
7	Estonia	358-351=709	−11
8	Italy	364-349=713	−7
9	Germany	360-355=715	−5
10	Sweden	363-352=715	−5
11	Denmark	369-352=721	+1
12	Belgium	364-360=724	+4
13	Spain	362-364=726	+6
14	Wales	371-356=727	+7
15	Iceland	364-367=731	+11
16	Poland	381-381=762	+42

Note: In the event of a tie the order is determined by the
best of the non-counting scores in each of the tied teams.

Individual leaders
Place	Player	Country	Score	To par
1	Nevill Ruiter	Netherlands	68-67=135	−9
T2	Lauri Rosendahl	Finland	69-67=136	−8
T2	Wilhelm Ryding	Sweden	71-65=136	−8
T2	Sakke Siltala	Finland	67-69=136	−8
T2	Andreas Trym Dam Fogth	Denmark	70-66=136	−8
T6	Giovanni Binaghi	Italy	68-69=137	−7
T6	Stuart Grehan	Ireland	71-66=137	−7
8	Thomas Higgins	Ireland	70-68=138	−6
T9	Lev Grinberg	France	70-69=139	−5
T9	Sergio Jimenez Romero	Spain	70-69=139	−5
T9	Veikka Viskari	Finland	70-69=139	−5

Note: There was no official award for the lowest individual score.

Flight A

Bracket

Quarter finals
Italy	3
Finland	2
Ireland	3.5
England	1.5
France	3.5
Switzerland	1.5
Estonia	3
Netherlands	2

Semi finals
Ireland	4
Italy	3
Estonia	5
France	2

Final
Ireland	4
Estonia	3
Bronze match
Italy	4.5
France	2.5

Elimination matches
Finland	4
England	1
Switzerland	3
Netherlands	2

Match for 5th place
Finland	3.5
Switzerland	1.5
Match for 7th place
England	3.5
Netherlands	1.5

Final games
Ireland	Estonia
4	3
M. McClean / C. Rafferty 4 & 3	K. Jegers / Markus Varjun
S. Grehan / J. Doyle	Mattias Varjun/ R.J. Kivi 1 hole
Stuart Grehan 5 & 4	Richard Teder
Gavin Tiernan	Carl Hellat 2 & 1
Caolan Rafferty	Mattias Varjun 20th hole
Matthew McClean 2 & 1	Markus Varjun
Thomas Higins 20th hole	Kevin Jegers

Flight B

Bracket

Round 1
Germany	3.5
Poland	1.5
Belgium	4
Spain	1
Wales	3
Denmark	2
Iceland	3
Sweden	2

Round 2
Germany	3
Belgium	2
Wales	4.5
Iceland	0.5

Match for 9th place
Germany	3.5
Wales	1.5
Match for 11th place
Iceland	3.5
Belgium	1.5

Elimination matches
Spain	3.5
Poland	1.5
Sweden	3.5
Denmark	1.5

Match for 13th place
Sweden	4
Spain	1
Match for 15th place
Denmark	3.5
Poland	1.5

Final standings

Place	Country
1st place, gold medalist(s)	Ireland
2nd place, silver medalist(s)	Estonia
3rd place, bronze medalist(s)	Italy
4	France
5	Finland
6	Switzerland
7	England
8	Netherlands
9	Germany
10	Wales
11	Iceland
12	Belgium
13	Sweden
14	Spain
15	Denmark
16	Poland

== See also ==
- Eisenhower Trophy – biennial world amateur team golf championship for men organized by the International Golf Federation.
- European Amateur Championship – European amateur individual golf championship for men organised by the European Golf Association.
- European Ladies' Team Championship – European amateur team golf championship for women organised by the European Golf Association.
