= Kristian Hjort Bressum =

Danish professional golfer (born 2000)

Personal information
- Nationality: Denmark
- Born: 28 September 2000 (age 26) Randers, Denmark

Career
- Sport: Golf
- Turned professional: 2025
- Current tour: Challenge Tour

Kristian Hjort Bressum (born 28 September 2000) is a Danish professional golfer and Challenge Tour player. He was runner-up at the 2025 European Amateur and the 2026 Hangzhou Open.

== Amateur career ==
Before committing to golf, Bressum was an elite footballer playing for Randers FC. In 2024, he won the Danish International Amateur Championship.

Bressum was runner-up at the 2025 European Amateur at Vasatorp Golf Club in Sweden, three strokes behind Filip Jakubčík. He represented Denmark at the 2025 Eisenhower Trophy held at Tanah Merah Country Club in Singapore, where his three-man team tied for 7th.

Bressum appeared at the European Amateur Team Championship twice, earning a silver medal both at the 2023 event in Belgium and in 2025 at Killarney Golf & Fishing Club in Ireland.

== Professional career ==
Bressum turned professional in late 2025 after he finished 4th in the 2025 Global Amateur Pathway rankings, earning a 2026 Challenge Tour card.

In his rookie season, Bressum struggled in the first half of the year, then hit his stride after a tied 4th-place finish at the Raiffeisenbank Golf Challenge in July. He was in contention at the English Trophy, holding the overnight lead, before ultimately finishing solo 3rd, two strokes behind winner Frederik Kjettrup.

Bressum then dueled with compatriot Hamish Brown at the Hangzhou Open in China, ultimately finishing in second place a stroke behind, to finish his rookie season 18th in the rankings, narrowly missing out on a full European Tour card.

== Personal life ==
He is a brother of politician Mathilde Hjort Bressum.

== Amateur wins ==
- 2021 Lubker Championship, Holstebro Open Championship, Barloseborg Elite Open
- 2024 Danish International Amateur Championship

== Team appearances ==
Amateur

- European Amateur Team Championship (representing Denmark): 2023, 2025
- Spirit International Amateur (representing Denmark): 2024
- Eisenhower Trophy (representing Denmark): 2025
- St Andrews Trophy (representing the continent of Europe): 2025
