= Cissye Meeks Gallagher =

American amateur golfer (born 1966)

Mary "Cissye" Meeks Gallagher (born November 7, 1966) is an American amateur golfer. While attending Louisiana State University, she won the South Alabama Invitational and the 1988 World University Golf Championship. She transitioned from amateur to professional golfer while on the Futures Tour during the late 1980s. Meeks was tied for eighth place at the 1989 Forest Lake Futures Classic.

As Cissye Meeks-Gallagher, she was on the LPGA Tour during 1990. She stopped playing that year before becoming an amateur again in 1992. By 2022, Gallagher won twelve Women's Amateurs, two Mid-Amateurs and three Senior Amateurs in Mississippi. She holds the record with her twelve Women's Amateur victories. Gallagher joined the Mississippi Sports Hall of Fame in 2019.

== Early life and education ==
Meeks was born in Greenwood, Mississippi on November 7, 1966. She grew up with two siblings and her parents. Meeks was interested in golf during her childhood. She became a golfer in the late 1970s.

Meeks played golf with boys while attending Pillow Academy in the early 1980s. They were first at the 1980 State Academy Golf Championship. Her wins at the Mississippi Junior Girls State Golf Championship were during 1980 and 1981. In 1984, Meeks played in the first round of the U.S. Girls' Junior and was 17th in the Junior PGA Championship. She also played basketball while attending Pillow Academy.

Meeks continued to play golf in 1984 after becoming a Louisiana State University student. She was the 1988 South Alabama Invitational winner. That year, Meeks had a 23rd place tie at the NCAA women's golf championship and won the World University Golf Championship. She held the stroke average season record for Louisiana State in 1987 and 1988.

== Career ==
=== Early career ===
Meeks was the Mississippi Women's Amateur champion in 1986, 1987, and 1988. Throughout these years, she reached the third round of the 1987 Women's Western Amateur. Meeks was a quarter-finalist at the Women's Trans National in 1987 and 1988. She also played in the first round of the 1988 U.S. Women's Amateur.

Meeks wanted to become a professional golfer in 1987. She continued her amateur career on the Futures Tour during 1988. Meeks began planning her professional debut at the end of the year. During 1989, she had become a professional on the Futures Tour. Meeks finished tied for eighth place at that year's Forest Lake Futures Classic. She received a spot on the LPGA Tour during October 1989.

=== 1990-present ===
Cissye Meeks-Gallagher played on the LPGA Tour during 1990. By September 1990, she stopped playing due to injury. Gallagher had shoulder surgery the following month. She became an amateur again in 1992. Throughout the early 1990s, Gallagher focused on her family and reduced her golf experience. She did not want to resume her LPGA experience during the mid 1990s.

Gallagher and her Mississippi teammates were third at the 2003 Southeastern Women's Amateur Team Championship. In Mississippi, she became the leader for most victories at the Women's Amateur during 2004. She was first at this event for the 12th time in 2015. Throughout this time period, Gallagher won the 2004 Four-Ball with Alexis Rather. She was first in three Senior Amateurs and two Mid-Amateurs by 2022. Gallagher continued to hold her Women's Amateur record in 2025.

At USGA events, Gallagher reached the third round of the 2001 U.S. Women's Mid-Amateur. She and her Mississippi teammates were fourth at the 2009 USGA Women's State Team Championship. Gallagher was in the round of 64 during the 2025 U.S. Senior Women's Amateur.

Apart from playing golf, Gallagher begun her fundraiser experience with the Tour Wives Association by 1992. She was their second vice president in 1994. During the late 1990s, Gallagher was their president. She became an oil painter by 2025.

== Awards and honors ==
The National Golf Foundation chose Gallagher as a co-recipient of their 1990 Jack Nicklaus Family of the Year. She was named the 2018 Women's Senior Player of the Year for the Mississippi Golf Association. She joined their Hall of Fame the following year. Gallagher joined the Mississippi Sports Hall of Fame in 2019.

== Personal life ==
Meeks married PGA Tour golfer Jim Gallagher Jr. in 1989. She has four children.
