= Albert Hansson =

Swedish golfer

Personal information
- Full name: Albert Elias Hansson
- Nationality: Sweden
- Born: 13 February 2004 (age 22) Fiskebäckskil, Sweden
- Height: 5 ft 11 in (180 cm)
- Weight: 175 lb (79 kg)

Career
- Sport: Golf
- College: Georgia Tech
- Status: Amateur

Achievements and awards
- Atlantic Coast Conference Freshman of the Year: 2025

Albert Elias Hansson (born 13 February 2004) is a Swedish amateur golfer. He won the 2022 Junior Golf World Cup individual title, the 2022 R&A Boys Amateur Championship, and the 2023 European Nations Cup – Copa Sotogrande.

== Early life ==
Hansson plays out of Skaftö Golf Club in Fiskebäckskil, on the small Swedish west coast island Skaftö with 1,400 inhabitants. From the age of 6 until 13 his coach was Mikael Kinhult, father of professional golfers Marcus Kinhult and Frida Kinhult.

He attended the Golf Academy at Riksidrottsgymnasiet Helsingborg.

== Amateur career ==
Hansson was part of the Swedish team earning bronze at the 2021 European Boys' Team Championship in Denmark after Sweden lost the semi-final to Germany 3–4. The year after, he joined the Swedish national team.

In 2022, Hansson won the Junior Golf World Cup individually and finished third with the team, behind Canada and host Japan. He beat his friend and classmate Didrik Ringvall Bengtsson, 2 and 1, in the final to win the 95th Boys Amateur Championship at Carnoustie Golf Links, Scotland. On the basis of these results, he was selected to represent Europe in the Bonallack Trophy and also at the Jacques Léglise Trophy, in which the Europeans prevailed 13 1/2 to 11 1/2 over the British and Irish team at Blairgowrie Golf Club, Scotland. He won the Swedish Golf Team Invitation at Barsebäck Golf & Country Club, four strokes ahead of Wilhelm Ryding and Didrik Ringvall Bengtsson.

Hansson was medalist at the 2022 Nordic Golf League Qualifying School at Vasatorp Golf Club, and tied for 8th at the Q-School Final at Rya Golf Club. He finished 7th in the first NGL event of 2023, the GolfStar Winter Series I in Spain.

In March 2023, he lost the final of the Spanish International Amateur Championship to Nicola Gerhardsen of Switzerland, 1 up. In April, he won the European Nations Cup – Copa Sotogrande in a playoff against John Gough of England, joining past champions of the event such as Pádraig Harrington, Sergio García, Francesco Molinari, Shane Lowry and Rory McIlroy. He was runner-up at the St Andrews Links Trophy in June, and reached a career-high of 29th on the World Amateur Golf Ranking in August.

In 2024, Hansson won the 2024 European Amateur Team Championship in Italy with the Swedish team.

Hansson enrolled at Georgia Tech in the fall of 2024 and started playing for the Georgia Tech Yellow Jackets, where he was named the 2025 ACC Freshman of the Year.

== Amateur wins ==
- 2022 Junior Golf World Cup (individual title), Boys Amateur Championship, Swedish Golf Team Invitation
- 2023 European Nations Cup – Copa Sotogrande (individual title)
- 2025 Ben Hogan Collegiate Invitational

== Team appearances ==
Amateur

- European Boys' Team Championship (representing Sweden): 2021, 2022
- Junior Golf World Cup (representing Sweden): 2022
- Jacques Léglise Trophy (representing Continental Europe): 2022 (winners)
- Bonallack Trophy (representing Europe): 2023
- Eisenhower Trophy (representing Europe): 2023
- European Amateur Team Championship (representing Sweden): 2024 (winners), 2025
