= 2024 European Amateur Team Championship =

Golf competition

Tournament information
- Dates: 9–13 July 2024
- Location: Turin, Piedmont, Italy; 45°11′10″N 07°33′00″E
- Course: Royal Park I Roveri (Allianz Course)
- Organized by: European Golf Association
- Format: Qualification round: 36 holes stroke play Knock-out match-play

Statistics
- Par: 72
- Length: 7,181 yards (6,566 m)
- Field: 16 teams 96 players

Champion
- Sweden; Simon Hovdal, Albert Hansson, Algot Kleen, Jakob Melin, Daniel Svärd, Lucas Augustsson
- Qualification round: 352 (−8); Final match: 3 – 2
- Location in Europe Location in Italy Location in Piedmont

The 2024 European Amateur Team Championship took place 9–13 July at the Royal Park I Roveri in Turin, Italy. It was the 41st men's golf European Amateur Team Championship.

Defending champion was Team Spain.

== Venue ==
The hosting club was founded in 1971 by the Agnelli family and the same year The Allianz Course, a parkland and forest course, was designed by Robert Trent Jones Sr, situated in Fiano, Parco La Mandria, 20 kilometers north-west of the city center of Turin in the region Piedmont, Italy. The course had previously hosted the 2009–2012 Italian Open on the European Tour, the 2008 European Amateur Team Championship and the 2021 European Ladies Amateur Championship.

=== Course layout ===
Tee location on each hole varied why specified hole length is approximate.

Hole	Meters	Par	Hole	Meters	Par
1	368	4	10	375	4
2	375	4	11	510	5
3	398	4	12	180	3
4	190	3	13	369	4
5	557	5	14	411	4
6	144	3	15	198	3
7	347	4	16	390	4
8	500	5	17	428	4
9	347	4	18	479	5
Out	3,226	36	In	3,340	36
Source:		Total		6,566	72

== Format ==
Each team consisted of six players. On the first two days each player played 18 holes of stroke play each day. The lowest five scores from each team's six players counted to the team total each day.

The eight best teams formed flight A, in knock-out match-play over the following three days. The teams were seeded based on their positions after the stroke play. The first placed team was drawn to play the quarter final against the eight placed team, the second against the seventh, the third against the sixth and the fourth against the fifth. Teams were allowed to use six players during the team matches, selecting four of them in the two morning foursome games and five players into the afternoon singles games. Teams knocked out after the quarter finals played one foursome game and four singles games in each of their remaining matches. Extra holes were played in games that were all square after 18 holes. However, if the result of the team match was already decided, undecided games were declared halved.

Due to bad weather, the schedule of play was delayed, while the final and the bronze match were shortened, each to be played with one foursome game and four singles games.

== Teams ==
A total of 16 nation teams contested the event. Qualified were the top 13 teams from the 2023 European Amateur Team Championship, including host nation Italy, and the three top teams from the 2023 European Amateur Team Championship Division 2, Scotland, Portugal and Austria. Each team consisted of six players.

Participating teams
Country	Players
Austria	Florian Schweighofer, Christoph Bleier, Markus Habeler, Maximilian Klaus, Fabian Lang, Jakob Lotschak
Denmark	Magnus Becker Frederiksen, Emil Elkjær Petersen, Mads Heller, Oscar Holm Bredkjær, Jonathan Nielsen, Jacob Skov Olesen
England	Jack Bigham, Dominic Clemons, Matthew Dodd-Berry, Will Hopkins, Harley Smith, Tyler Weaver
Estonia	Carl Enn Hellat, Kevin Christopher Jegers, Ralf Johan Kivi, Richard Teder, Markus Varjun, Mattias Varjun
Finland	Niilo Mäki-Petäjä, Markus Luoma, Elias Haavisto, Topi Lindström, Veikka Viskari, Sakke Siltala
France	Bastien Amat, Paul Beauvy, Edouard Cereto, Gaspar Glaudas, Ugo Malcor, Darren Strachan
Germany	Tiger Christensen, Tom Haberer, Yannick Malik, Carl Siemens, Peer Wernicke, Tim Wiedemeyer
Ireland	Hugh Foley, Sean Keeling, Max Kennedy, Matthew McClean, Liam Nolan, Caolan Rafferty
Italy	Matteo Cristoni, Riccardo Fantinelli, Michele Ferrero, Marco Florioli, Luca Memeo, Filippo Ponzano
Netherlands	Loran Appel, Jack Ingham, Jerry Ji, Benjamin Reuter, Nevill Ruiter, Lars van der Vight
Portugal	Miguel Cardoso, Kiko Francisco Coelho, Pedro Cruz Silva, João Iglésias, João Pereira, João Teixeira e Costa
Scotland	Cameron Adam, Connor Graham, Gregor Graham, Jack McDonald, Calum Scott, Gregor Tait
Spain	José Luis Ballester, Luis Masaveu, Pablo Ereño, Jaime Montojo, Javier Barcos, Pablo Alperi
Sweden	Simon Hovdal, Albert Hansson, Algot Kleen, Jakob Melin, Daniel Svärd, Lucas Augustsson
Switzerland	Patrick Foley, Nicola Gerhardsen, Tom Mao, Loïc Naas, Max Schliesing, Maximilien Sturdza
Wales	James Ashfield, Jonathan Bale, Tom Bastow, Tomi Bowen, Tom Matthews, Matt Roberts

== Winners ==
Leader of the opening 36-hole competition was team Germany, with a 32-under-par score of 688, three strokes ahead of team Estonia. There was no official award for the lowest individual score, but individual leader was Jerry Ji, Netherlands, with a 14-under-par score of 130, two strokes ahead of nearest competitor.

Team Sweden won the gold medal, earning their fourth title and first since 2019, beating team Netherlands in the final 3–2. The final was decided on the last green in the match between Jakob Melin, Sweden, and Loran Appel, Netherlands. Team Germany earned the bronze on third place, after beating Estonia 4–1 in the bronze match.

Scotland, Wales and Austria finished in the last three positions and were moved to the European Amateur Team Championship Division 2 for 2025.

== Results ==
Qualification round

Team standings after first round
Place	Country	Score	To par
1	Germany	345	−15
2	Estonia	346	−14
3	Scotland *	351	−9
4	France	351	−9
5	Sweden *	352	−8
6	Netherlands	352	−8
7	England *	354	−6
8	Ireland	354	−6
9	Italy	356	−4
10	Spain	357	−3
11	Switzerland	358	−2
12	Finland	359	−1
13	Austria	365	+5
14	Wales	366	+6
15	Denmark	370	+10
16	Portugal	377	+17

* Note: In the event of a tie the order was determined by the
best of the non-counting scores in each of the tied teams.

Team standings after final qualification round
Place	Country	Score	To par
1	Germany	345-343=688	−32
2	Estonia	346-348=694	−26
3	Spain	357-336=695	−25
4	Netherlands	352-344=696	−24
5	England	354-347=701	−19
6	Sweden	352-350=702	−18
7	France	351-352=703	−17
8	Italy	356-349=705	−15
9	Ireland	354-355=709	−11
10	Scotland	351-359=710	−10
11	Finland	359-353=712	−8
12	Switzerland	358-360=718	−2
13	Austria	365-355=720	E
14	Wales	366-357=723	+3
15	Denmark	370-355=725	+5
16	Portugal	377-373=750	+30

Individual leaders
Place	Player	Country	Score	To par
1	Jerry Ji	Netherlands	64-66=130	−14
2	Jakob Melin	Sweden	68-64=132	−12
3	Paul Beauvy	France	67-66=133	−11
T4	Luis Masaveu	Spain	68-66=134	−10
T4	Mattias Varjun	Estonia	67-67=134	−10
T6	Tiger Christensen	Germany	66-70=136	−8
T6	Pablo Ereño	Spain	72-64=136	−8
T8	Cameron Adam	Scotland	69-68=137	−7
T8	Bastien Amat	France	71-66=137	−7
T8	Jack Bigham	England	69-68=137	−7
T8	Dominic Clemons	England	68-69=137	−7
T8	Tim Wiedemeyer	Germany	70-67=137	−7

Note: There was no official award for the lowest individual score.

Flight A

Bracket

Quarter finals
Germany	5
Italy	2
Netherlands	4.5
England	2.5
Sweden	4
Spain	3
Estonia	4
France	3

Semi finals
Netherlands	5.5
Germany	1.5
Sweden	4.5
Estonia	2.5

Final
Sweden	3
Netherlands	2
Bronze match
Germany	4
Estonia	1

Elimination matches
Italy	3.5
England	1.5
France	3
Spain	2

Match for 5th place
France	4
Italy	1
Match for 7th place
England	3.5
Spain	1.5

Final games

Sweden	Netherlands
3	2
S. Hovdal / A. Kleen	L. van der Vight / J. Ingham 3 & 2
Daniel Svärd 2 & 1	Benjamin Reuter
Jakob Melin 1 hole	Loran Appel
Albert Hansson	Nevill Ruiter 5 & 3
Lucas Augustsson 5 & 3	Jerry Ji

Note: The final was shortened and played with one foursome game and four single games.

Flight B

Bracket

Round 1
Portugal	3
Ireland	2
Switzerland	3
Austria	2
Finland	3
Wales	2
Denmark	3.5
Scotland	1.5

Round 2
Switzerland	4
Portugal	1
Finland	3
Denmark	2

Match for 9th place
Finland	3
Switzerland	2
Match for 11th place
Denmark	4
Portugal	1

Elimination matches
Ireland	4
Austria	1
Scotland	3
Wales	2

Match for 13th place
Ireland	3
Scotland	2
Match for 15th place
Wales	3
Austria	2

Final standings
Place	Country
1st place, gold medalist(s)	Sweden
2nd place, silver medalist(s)	Netherlands
3rd place, bronze medalist(s)	Germany
4	Estonia
5	France
6	Italy
7	England
8	Spain
9	Finland
10	Switzerland
11	Denmark
12	Ireland
13	Portugal
14	Scotland
15	Wales
16	Austria

== See also ==
- Eisenhower Trophy – biennial world amateur team golf championship for men organized by the International Golf Federation.
- European Amateur Championship – European amateur individual golf championship for men organised by the European Golf Association.
- European Ladies' Team Championship – European amateur team golf championship for women organised by the European Golf Association.
