= Tim Wiedemeyer =

German golfer (born 2005)

Personal information
- Nationality: Germany
- Born: 14 January 2005 (age 21) Munich, Germany
- Height: 184 cm (6 ft 0 in)

Career
- Sport: Golf
- College: Texas Tech University
- Status: Amateur

Best results in major championships
- Masters Tournament: DNP
- PGA Championship: DNP
- U.S. Open: DNP
- The Open Championship: CUT: 2026

Tim Wiedemeyer (born 14 January 2005) is a German amateur golfer. In 2021, he won the European Young Masters, Jacques Léglise Trophy and the European Boys' Team Championship. In 2022, he won the Jacques Léglise Trophy, the European Boys' Team Championship and the German Boys & Girls Open with a score of -20. In 2023, he won the Jacques Léglise Trophy and he defended his title at the German Boys & Girls Open. In 2024, he won the St. Andrews Trophy and The Spring Indy at WinStar.

== Early life and amateur career ==
Wiedemeyer was born 2005 in Munich, and educated at Isar Gymnasium. He trains at Golf Club St. Leon-Rot and is attached to Golf Club St. Leon-Rot where he holds the course record of 64, and has enjoyed considerable success as a junior golfer.

He joined the German National Team in 2021. The same year he won the European Young Masters with the team and was runner-up individually, behind Jorge Siyuan Hao of Spain. He won the European Boys' Team Championship back-to-back, 2021 in Denmark and in 2022 at Golf Club St. Leon-Rot.

Individually, Wiedemeyer won the 2020 German U-16 Championship and 2021 German Match Play Championship, and the international German Boys Open back-to-back in 2022 and 2023.

He became the first golfer to win the Jacques Léglise Trophy with the continental European team three times 2021, 2022 and 2023, and was unbeaten in his first two appearances.

Wiedemeyer enrolled at Texas Tech University in 2023 and won once individually as a freshman playing with the Texas Tech Red Raiders golf team.

== Amateur wins ==
- 2020 Bavarian Open Championship, German U-16 Championship
- 2021 German Match Play Championship, Golfsportmanufaktur Schäfflertanz International Open
- 2022 German Boys Open
- 2023 German Boys Open
- 2024 The Spring Indy at WinStar
- 2025 OFCC/Fighting Illini Invitational
- 2026 European Amateur

== Results in major championships ==
Tournament	2026
Masters Tournament	
PGA Championship	
U.S. Open	
The Open Championship	CUT

Did not play

CUT = missed the half-way cut

== Team appearances ==
Amateur

- European Young Masters (representing Germany): 2021 (winners)
- Jacques Léglise Trophy (representing Continental Europe): 2021 (winners), 2022 (winners), 2023 (winners)
- European Boys' Team Championship (representing Germany): 2021 (winners), 2022 (winners), 2023
- Eisenhower Trophy (representing Germany): 2023, 2025
- European Amateur Team Championship (representing Germany): 2024, 2025
- St Andrews Trophy (representing the Continent of Europe): 2024 (winners)
- Bonallack Trophy (representing Europe): 2025
- Arnold Palmer Cup (representing the International team): 2026 (winners)
