= St Andrews Links Trophy =

Scottish amateur golf tournament

Tournament information
- Location: St Andrews, Scotland
- Established: 1989
- Course: Old Course at St Andrews
- Organised by: St Andrews Links Trust
- Format: Stroke play
- Month played: June

Tournament record score
- Aggregate: 264 Daan Huizing (2012)
- To par: –23 as above

Current champion
- (France) Lev Grinberg

The St Andrews Links Trophy is an international amateur golf tournament contested on the St Andrews Links in Scotland. It has been played annually since 1989.

The format is 72-hole stroke play over three days. 144 players compete in the first two rounds, after which the leading 40 competitors and ties play a further 36 holes over the Old Course on the final day. The course or courses used for the first two rounds has varied from year to year, with combinations of the Old, New and Jubilee courses used. Before 2003 the event was played over two days. Originally the Old and New courses were used on the opening day. The Jubilee course was first used in 1999.

== Winners ==
| Year | Winner(s) | Score | Margin of victory | Runner(s)-up | Ref. |
|---|---|---|---|---|---|
| 2026 | (France) Lev Grinberg | 269 | 7 strokes | (Netherlands) Melvin Muller | |
| 2025 | (Scotland) Cameron Adam | 271 | Playoff | (Ireland) John Doyle | |
| 2024 | (England) Seb Cave | 281 | 2 strokes | (Scotland) Calum Scott (England) Harley Smith | |
| 2023 | (Republic of Ireland) Alex Maguire | 266 | 5 strokes | (Sweden) Albert Hansson | |
| 2022 | (Australia) Connor McKinney | 272 | 2 strokes | (Australia) Adam Brady | |
| 2021 | (England) Jack Cope | 280 | Playoff (Note: Cope won with a birdie at the fourth extra hole. Burns was eliminated at the first extra hole.) | (Scotland) George Burns (England) Robin Williams | |
| 2020 | Cancelled due to COVID-19 pandemic in Scotland | | | | |
| 2019 | (England) Jake Burnage | 268 | 1 stroke | (England) Matty Lamb | |
| 2018 | (Republic of Ireland) John Murphy | 278 | Playoff (Note: Murphy beat de Bruyn with a birdie on the first playoff hole.) | (Germany) Jannik de Bruyn | |
| 2017 | (England) Matthew Jordan | 277 | 1 stroke | (Northern Ireland) John-Ross Galbraith | |
| 2016 | (Republic of Ireland) Conor O'Rourke | 275 | 1 stroke | (Scotland) Sandy Scott | |
| 2015 | (Italy) Federico Zucchetti | 214 (Note: Event reduced to 54 holes because of adverse weather.) | 1 stroke | (Italy) Filippo Campigli | |
| 2014 | (Scotland) Grant Forrest | 278 | Playoff (Note: Forrest beat Neil with a birdie on the first playoff hole.) | (Scotland) Bradley Neil | |
| 2013 | (England) Neil Raymond | 282 | 2 strokes | (England) Ryan Evans (England) Nathan Kimsey (England) Max Orrin | |
| 2012 | (Netherlands) Daan Huizing | 264 | 14 strokes | (Northern Ireland) Alan Dunbar | |
| 2011 | (England) Tom Lewis | 279 | 4 strokes | (Wales) Rhys Enoch (Netherlands) Daan Huizing (Bolivia) Sebastian Maclean | |
| 2010 | (England) Matthew Southgate | 275 | 5 strokes | (England) Stiggy Hodgson (Scotland) Philip McLean | |
| 2009 | (Northern Ireland) Alan Dunbar | 285 | 1 stroke | (England) Matt Haines | |
| 2008 | (Scotland) Keir McNicoll | 283 | 1 stroke | (Scotland) Michael Stewart (France) Rudy Thuillier | |
| 2007 | (Wales) Llewellyn Matthews | 273 | 3 strokes | (Australia) Scott Arnold | |
| 2006 | (England) Oliver Fisher | 280 | 2 strokes | (Australia) Stephen Dartnall | |
| 2005 | (Scotland) Lloyd Saltman | 275 | 4 strokes | (England) Jamie Moul | |
| 2004 | (Scotland) Jamie McLeary | 284 | 7 strokes | (England) Richard Walker | |
| 2003 | (England) Richard Finch | 276 | 5 strokes | (England) Lee Corfield | |
| 2002 | (Scotland) Simon Mackenzie | 289 | 4 strokes | (England) Farren Keenan (Wales) Stuart Manley | |
| 2001 | (Scotland) Steven O'Hara | 281 | 4 strokes | (England) Paul Bradshaw | |
| 2000 | (England) Matthew King | 140 (Note: Event reduced to 36 holes because of adverse weather.) | 1 stroke | (Wales) Jamie Donaldson | |
| 1999 | (Scotland) David Patrick | 152 | 1 stroke | (England) Adam Frayne (Scotland) Stuart Wilson | |
| 1998 | (Scotland) Craig Watson | 276 | 2 strokes | (England) Simon Dyson | |
| 1997 | (England) Justin Rose | 284 | Playoff (Note: Rose beat Orveland with a par at the first playoff hole after Orveland drove into the Swilcen Burn.) | (Norway) Morten Orveland | |
| 1996 | (Scotland) Barclay Howard | 282 | 5 strokes | (Wales) Matthew Ellis (Scotland) Euan Little | |
| 1995 | (Scotland) Graham Rankin | 276 | 2 strokes | (Scotland) Gordon Sherry | |
| 1994 | (Scotland) Barclay Howard | 294 | 1 stroke | (England) Warren Bennett (Wales) Garry Houston | |
| 1993 | (Scotland) Garry Hay | 280 | 1 stroke | (England) Van Phillips | |
| 1992 | (Scotland) Craig Watson | 281 | 1 stroke | (Wales) Simon Wilkinson | |
| 1991 | (England) Ricky Willison | 289 | 2 strokes | (England) Gary Evans | |
| 1990 | (Australia) Stuart Bouvier | 280 | 7 strokes | (United States) Mike Brannan | |
| 1989 | (England) Russell Claydon | 284 | 2 strokes | (Scotland) Jim Milligan | |

== See also ==
- St Rule Trophy
