= Boys Home Internationals =

Amateur team golf competition

Tournament information
- Established: 1985
- Course: Ashburnham Golf Club (2019)
- Format: Team match play
- Month played: August

Current champion
- England

The Boys Home Internationals was an amateur team golf championship for boys between the four Home Nations. Ireland was represented by the whole island of Ireland.The event was organised by The R&A. The inaugural event was held in 1985 and the venue cycled between the four nations. The winning team received the R&A Trophy. Originally it was played immediately before, and at the same venue, as the Boys Amateur Championship. However from 1997 it was held as a separate event. In 2021 the match was replaced by a combined Girls and Boys Home Internationals.

A match between Scotland and England boys had been played since 1923 while Ireland and Wales had played a match since 1972.

== Format ==
Each team played the other three teams over three successive days. Each team had 11 players. Each match involved 5 18-hole foursomes in the morning and 10 18-hole singles in the afternoon.

From 1985 to 1995 the contest was played in a knock-out format over two days. England and Scotland had played a boys' international since 1923 and a match between Ireland and Wales had also been played, on the same day, since 1972. These two matches continued to be played, acting as semi-finals, with the two winning teams meeting to decide the winner of the home internationals. The two first-day losers also played each other on the second day.

== Results ==
Year	Venue	Location	Winner	W	Runner-up	W	Third	W	Fourth	W	Refs.
2020	Killarney	Ireland	Cancelled								
2019	Ashburnham	Wales	England	3	Ireland	2	Scotland	1	Wales	0	
2018	Royal Dornoch	Scotland	England	3	Ireland	2	Scotland	1	Wales	0	
2017	St Annes Old Links	England	England	3	Ireland	1.5	Wales	1	Scotland	0.5	
2016	Ballyliffin	Ireland	England	3	Scotland	2	Ireland	1	Wales	0	
2015	Conwy (Caernarfonshire)	Wales	Scotland	3	England	2	Ireland	1	Wales	0	
2014	Western Gailes	Scotland	England	3	Scotland	2	Ireland	1	Wales	0	
2013	Forest Pines	England	Ireland	2.5	England	2	Scotland	1.5	Wales	0	
2012	County Louth	Ireland	England	3	Scotland	2	Ireland	1	Wales	0	
2011	Royal St. David’s	Wales	England	3	Wales	1/22.5	Scotland	1/21	Ireland	1/18	
2010	Southerness	Scotland	Ireland	2.5	Scotland	2	England	1	Wales	0.5	
2009	Hankley Common	England	England	2.5	Ireland	2	Scotland	1	Wales	0.5	
2008	Royal County Down	Ireland	Ireland	3	England	2	Wales	1	Scotland	0	
2007	Machynys Peninsula	Wales	England	3	Ireland	2	Scotland	1	Wales	0	
2006	Moray	Scotland	Scotland	2.5	Ireland	2	England	1.5	Wales	0	
2005	Woodhall Spa	England	England	3	Wales	2	Scotland	1	Ireland	0	
2004	Portmarnock	Ireland	England	3	Scotland	1.5	Wales	1	Ireland	0.5	
2003	Royal St. David’s	Wales	England	2.5	Ireland	2	Scotland	1	Wales	0.5	
2002	Blairgowrie	Scotland	England	3	Wales	2	Ireland	1	Scotland	0	
2001	Moortown	England	England	2.5	Scotland	2	Ireland	1.5	Wales	0	
2000	Portmarnock	Ireland	England	2/25.5	Scotland	2/25	Ireland	1/22	Wales	1/17.5	
1999	Conwy (Caernarfonshire)	Wales	England	3	Scotland	2	Wales	1	Ireland	0	
1998	St Andrews (Jubilee)	Scotland	England	3	Scotland	2	Ireland	1	Wales	0	
1997	Royal North Devon	England	Ireland	3	Wales	2	Scotland	1	England	0	
1996	Littlestone	England	England	3	Scotland	2	Ireland	1	Wales	0	

Year	Venue	Location	Winner(s)	Score	Runner-up	Third	Score	Fourth	Ref.
1995	Dunbar	Scotland	Scotland	10–5	Wales	England	14–1	Ireland	
1994	Little Aston	England	England	11.5–3.5	Ireland	Scotland	12.5–2.5	Wales	
1993	Glenbervie	Scotland	England	11–4	Ireland	Scotland	10.5–4.5	Wales	
1992	Royal Mid-Surrey	England	Scotland; Wales	7.5–7.5	Tie	England	10.5–4.5	Ireland	
1991	Montrose	Scotland	England	12–3	Wales	Ireland; Scotland	7.5–7.5	Tie	
1990	Hunstanton	England	Scotland	12.5–2.5	Ireland	England	11–4	Wales	
1989	Nairn	Scotland	England	11.5–3.5	Wales	Scotland	12–3	Ireland	
1988	Formby	England	England	14–1	Wales	Scotland	9–6	Ireland	
1987	Kilmarnock (Barassie)	Scotland	Scotland	10.5–4.5	Wales	England	9.5–5.5	Ireland	
1986	Seaton Carew	England	Ireland	8.5–6.5	Scotland	England	10–5	Wales	
1985	Royal Burgess	Scotland	England; Ireland	7.5–7.5	Tie	Scotland	11–4	Wales	

== Earlier England–Scotland matches ==
Before the Boys Home Internationals was founded, an annual match had been played between England and Scotland since 1923. It was also played immediately before, and generally at the same venue, as the Boys Amateur Championship.

The first match was held on Monday 27 August 1923 at Dunbar, before the third Boys Amateur Championship. There were 10 singles matches with Scotland winning 6, England 3 with one match halved. Scotland won again in 1924 before England won in 1925 and 1926. The 1926 was reduced to just 8 singles matches. Foursomes matches were added in 1927; the match consisting of four foursomes and eight singles. Scotland won the match 7–5. England won a close match in 1928 but Scotland won 9 of the 11 matches between 1929 and 1939. England only win in the 1930s was in 1934, with the 1935 match being tied. Of the 17 matches up to 1939, Scotland had won 12 with England winning 4 and one match tied.

The contest resumed in 1946 with England winning the first three post-war matches. In 1950, an increase in the number of entries for the Boys Championship meant that the England–Scotland match was held on a Saturday for the first time. It was played on a Monday in 1951 but then became a regular Saturday event. From 1958 to 1966 a match was played between a combined England and Scotland team and a team from the Continent of Europe, the forerunner of the Jacques Léglise Trophy. In 1958 and 1959 this match was played on a Saturday with the England–Scotland match played the day before, a Friday. However, from 1960 to 1966 the order of the matches was reversed, the England–Scotland match returning to the Saturday. From 1965 the format was changed; the match consisting of five foursomes and ten singles.

The Jacques Léglise Trophy was started in 1977 and was played on a Friday, the England–Scotland match continuing to be played on the Saturday.

Year	Venue	Location	Winner	Score	Ref.
1984	Royal Porthcawl	Wales	England	9½–5½	
1983	Glenbervie	Scotland	England	8–7	
1982	Burnham & Berrow	England	England	8–7	
1981	Gullane	Scotland	Tie	7½–7½	
1980	Formby	England	England	9–6	
1979	Kilmarnock (Barassie)	Scotland	England	11–4	
1978	Seaton Carew	England	Scotland	8½–6½	
1977	Downfield	Scotland	England	8–7	
1976	Sunningdale	England	Scotland	8–7	
1975	Bruntsfield Links	Scotland	England	9½–5½	
1974	Royal Liverpool	England	England	11–4	
1973	Blairgowrie	Scotland	England	9–6	
1972	Moortown	England	England	13½–1½	
1971	Kilmarnock (Barassie)	Scotland	Tie	7½–7½	
1970	Hillside	England	England	12–3	
1969	Dunbar	Scotland	England	12–3	
1968	St Annes Old Links	England	England	10–5	
1967	Western Gailes	Scotland	Scotland	8–7	
1966	Moortown	England	England	12–3	
1965	Gullane	Scotland	England	10–5	
1964	Formby	England	England	9–3	
1963	Prestwick	Scotland	Scotland	9–3	
1962	Royal Mid-Surrey	England	England	6½–5½	
1961	Dalmahoy	Scotland	Scotland	7–5	
1960	Olton	England	England	10–2	
1959	Pollok	Scotland	England	8½–3½	
1958	Moortown	England	England	7–5	
1957	Carnoustie	Scotland	Scotland	7½–4½	
1956	Sunningdale	England	England	7½–4½	
1955	Kilmarnock (Barassie)	Scotland	Scotland	9–3	
1954	Royal Liverpool	England	England	6½–5½	
1953	Dunbar	Scotland	Scotland	7–5	
1952	Formby	England	England	6½–5½	
1951	Prestwick	Scotland	England	7–5	
1950	Royal Lytham & St Annes	England	Scotland	8½–3½	
1949	St Andrews	Scotland	Scotland	8–4	
1948	Kilmarnock (Barassie)	Scotland	England	9–3	
1947	Royal Liverpool	England	England	7–5	
1946	Bruntsfield Links	Scotland	England	8½–3½	
1940–1945: No tournament due to World War II
1939	Carnoustie	Scotland	Scotland	7–5	
1938	Moor Park	England	Scotland	7½–4½	
1937	Bruntsfield Links	Scotland	Scotland	9½–2½	
1936	Birkdale	England	Scotland	8½–3½	
1935	Royal Aberdeen	Scotland	Tie	6–6	
1934	Moortown	England	England	9–3	
1933	Carnoustie	Scotland	Scotland	7–5	
1932	Royal Lytham & St Annes	England	Scotland	8–4	
1931	Glasgow Golf Club	Scotland	Scotland	7½–4½	
1930	Fulwell	England	Scotland	8–4	
1929	Royal Burgess	Scotland	Scotland	9½–2½	
1928	Formby	England	England	6½–5½	
1927	Royal Burgess	Scotland	Scotland	7–5	
1926	Coombe Hill	England	England	4½–3½	
1925	Royal Burgess	Scotland	England	6–4	
1924	Coombe Hill	England	Scotland	6–4	
1923	Dunbar	Scotland	Scotland	6½–3½	

== Earlier Ireland–Wales matches ==
The match was first played in 1972 on the same day as the England–Scotland match, the Saturday before the Boys Amateur Championship.

Year	Venue	Location	Winner	Score	Ref.
1984	Royal Porthcawl	Wales	Wales	6½–5½	
1983	Glenbervie	Scotland	Ireland	7–5	
1982	Burnham & Berrow	England	Wales	9–3	
1981	Gullane	Scotland	Ireland	8–4	
1980	Formby	England	Wales	6½–5½	
1979	Kilmarnock (Barassie)	Scotland	Ireland	9½–2½	
1978	Seaton Carew	England	Wales	8–4	
1977	Downfield	Scotland	Ireland	6½–5½	
1976	Sunningdale	England	Wales	7½–1½	
1975	Bruntsfield Links	Scotland	Wales	6½–2½	
1974	Royal Liverpool	England	Wales	5–4	
1973	Blairgowrie	Scotland	Ireland	5½–3½	
1972	Moortown	England	Ireland	5–4	

== See also ==
- Jacques Léglise Trophy
