= Golf Club St. Leon-Rot =

Golf club in St. Leon-Rot, Germany

Coordinates: 49.245°N 8.636°E

Location in Germany

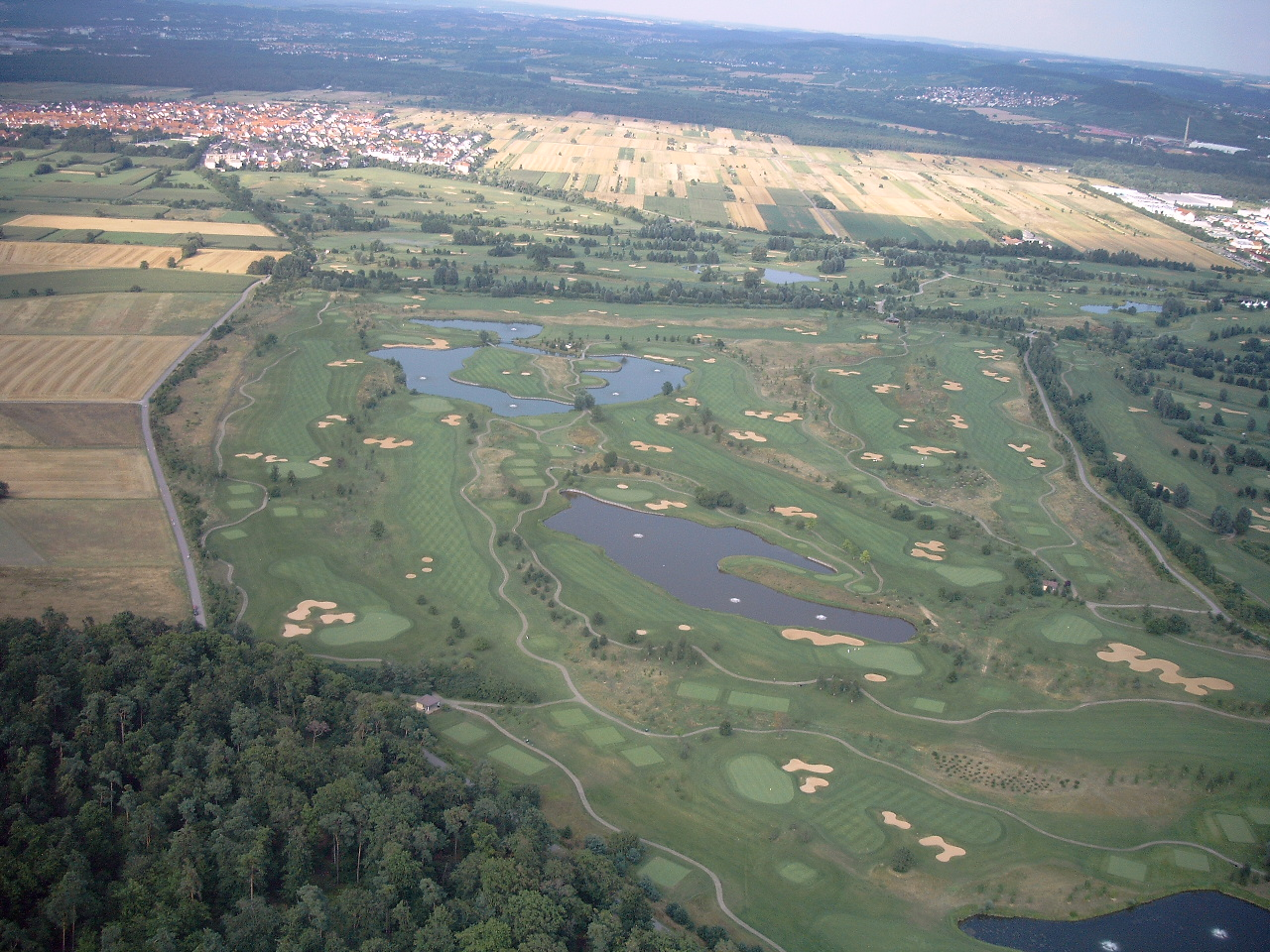
Golf Club St. Leon-Rot

Golf Club St. Leon-Rot is a golf club in St. Leon-Rot, Baden-Württemberg, Germany, 20 km south of Heidelberg. It hosted the Deutsche Bank - SAP Open TPC of Europe in 1999, 2001, 2002 and 2004, Tiger Woods winning on the first three occasions. It also hosted the 2015 Solheim Cup.

The club was founded in 1997 by SAP co-founder Dietmar Hopp. There are two 18 hole courses, called St. Leon and Rot. The Solheim Cup was played on the St. Leon course while the Junior Solheim Cup was played on the Rot course.
