= Girls and Boys Home Internationals =

Amateur team golf competition

Tournament information
- Established: 2021
- Course(s): Conwy Golf Club (2024)
- Format: Team match play
- Month played: August

Current champion
- England

The Girls and Boys Home Internationals are an amateur team golf championship for girls and boys, between the four Home Nations. Ireland are represented by the whole island of Ireland.The event is organised by The R&A. The inaugural event was held in 2021 and superseded separate Girls and Boys events.

== Format ==
The championship is played over three days with the four teams competing against each other in individual matches. Each team has 16 players, 7 girls and 9 boys. A match consists of 7 foursomes (3 girls and 4 boys) and 14 singles (6 girls and 8 boys) each over 18 holes. The result is decided by team results with each team scoring one point for a team win and half a point for a halved match. Ties are resolved by the number of individual matches won. Players must be under 18 at the start of the year in which the event takes place.

== History ==
The first combined girls and boys home internationals were held at Woodhall Spa in August 2021, and were held concurrently with the women's and seniors events. The format was the same as that used in 2022 but teams were the minimum necessary, six girls and eight boys. England won the event after a narrow 11–10 victory over Scotland on the final day. In 2021 the event was called the Junior Home Internationals.

In 2022, the teams competed in separate girls and boys competitions as well as the combined event. England won all three competitions.

== Results ==
Year	Venue	Location	Winner	W	Runner-up	W	Third	W	Fourth	W	Girls winner	Boys winner	Refs.
2024	Conwy	Wales	England	3	Scotland	2	Ireland	1	Wales	0	England	England	
2023	Lindrick	England	England	3	Ireland	2	Scotland	1	Wales	0	England	Ireland	
2022	Downfield	Scotland	England	3	Ireland	2	Wales	0.5/24	Scotland	0.5/23.5	England	England	
2021	Woodhall Spa	England	England	3	Scotland	2	Ireland	1	Wales	0	–	–	
