= French International Boys Championship =

Amateur golf tournament in France

Tournament information
- Location: France
- Established: 1926
- Course: Golf de Saint-Germain
- Organised by: Fédération française de golf
- Format: Stroke play followed by match play
- Month played: April

Current champion
- (France) Oscar Couilleau

The French International Boys Championship, known as the Internationaux de France U18 - Trophee Carlhian, is an annual amateur golf tournament for men under 18 held in France.

The tournament was first played at Golf de Chantilly in 1926, and moved to Golf de Saint-Cloud in 1927. The competition has been played at many golf courses throughout France and has frequented several golf courses on more than one occasion. The trophy is named after French golfer Michel Carlhian (1911–1977).

From 1926 to 1950, the event was played in stroke play format. In 1951, it took its current form of a two-round stroke play qualification followed by a final match play bracket.

The championship did not take place 1940–1946, 1982, 1984 and in 2020. It is one of nine qualification events for the European team in the Junior Ryder Cup.

== Winners ==
Year	Champion	Score	Runner-up	Venue	Ref
Internationaux de France U18 - Trophee Carlhian
2025	(England) Charlie Rusbridge	41 holes	(Czech Republic) Matous Zach	Prieure	
2024	(France) Oscar Couilleau	3&2	(Finland) Leevi Hellberg	Stade Français Courson	
2023	(France) Louis Anceaux	39 holes	(Scotland) Connor Graham	Saint-Germain	
2022	(Germany) Carl Siemens	2&1	(Republic of Ireland) Sean Keeling	Les Aisses	
2021	(Denmark) Michael Mjaaseth	19 holes	(France) Maxence Giboudot	Barbaroux	
2020	No tournament				
2019	(Germany) Philipp Katich	9&8	(Italy) Matteo Cristoni	Les Aisses	
2018	(Italy) Andrea Romano	5&3	(Italy) Pietro Bovari	Saint-Germain	
2017	(Belgium) Adrien Dumont de Chassart	4&3	(Italy) Andrea Romano	Granville	
2016	(France) Guillaume Fanonnel	4&3	(France) Thibault Santigny	Omaha Beach	
2015	(France) Alexandre Petit	3&2	(Denmark) Jonathan Gøth-Rasmussen	Barbaroux	
2014	(Italy) Guido Migliozzi	2 up	(France) Augustin Holé	Médoc	
2013	(Germany) Dominic Foos	4&2	(England) Harry Ellis	Le Touquet	
2012	(Norway) Velte Maroy	6&5	(Norway) Petter Mikalsen	RCF La Boulie	
2011	(Norway) Kristoffer Ventura	3&2	(France) Pierre Tillement	Belle Dune	
2010	(Germany) Moritz Lampert	6&5	(Belgium) Thomas Detry	Belle Dune	
2009	(France) Romain Wattel	1 up	(Italy) Matteo Manassero	Toulouse-Seilh	
2008	(Germany) Sebastian Schwind	2&1	(France) Erwan Vieilledent	Toulouse-Seilh	
2007	(Netherlands) Floris de Vries	37 holes	(Norway) Frederik Kollevold	Toulouse-Seilh	
2006	(Germany) Sean Einhaus	1 up	(Sweden) Pontus Widegren	Toulouse-Seilh	
2005	(France) Alexandre Kaleka	5&4	(Belgium) Xavier Feyaerts	Toulouse-Seilh	
2004	(Netherlands) Wouter de Vries	3&2	(Netherlands) Reinier Saxton	Toulouse-Seilh	
2003	(Germany) Dennis Küpper	4&3	(Italy) Matteo Delpodio	Toulouse-Seilh	
2002	(Italy) Andrea Romano	4&3	(Italy) Matteo Delpodio	Toulouse-Seilh	
2001	(France) Arnaud Delbos	6&5	(Germany) Stefan Kirstein	Toulouse-Seilh	
2000	(Belgium) Nicolas Colsaerts	9&7	(Italy) Francesco Molinari	Toulouse-Seilh	
1999	(Italy) Stefano Reale	11&10	(Germany) Thomas Roelofsen	Massane	
1998	(Germany) Michael Thannhäuser	1 up	(France) Jean-Marc de Polo	Palmola	
1997	(Spain) Sergio García	9&8	(England) Gary Birch	Palmola	
1996	(France) Lionel Alexandre	3&2	(France) Fabrice Stoléar	Saint-Nom-la-Bretèche	
1995	(France) Christophe Ravetto	5&4	(England) Simon Hurd	Saint-Nom-la-Bretèche	
1994	(France) Alexandre Balicki	1 up	(Sweden) Markus Westerberg	Saint-Nom-la-Bretèche	
1993	(Germany) Tobias Biermann	2&1	(France) Thomas Pulitini	Saint-Nom-la-Bretèche	
1992	(France) Nicolas Beaufils	4&3	(France) Antoine Soubran	National	
1991	(France) Pierre-Olivier Rousseaux	5&4	(France) Nicolas Joakimides	RCF La Boulie	
1990	(France) Janeirik Dahlström	3&2	(England) Lee Thompson	Wimereux	
1989	(France) Christian Cévaër	7&6	(France) Ramuntcho Basurco	Bondues	
1988	(England) James Cook	6&5	(France) Cyril Eichacher	Saint-Nom-la-Bretèche	
1987	(England) Andrew Hare	2&1	(France) Romain Victor	Saint-Nom-la-Bretèche	
1986	(Spain) Yago Beamonte	2&1	(Germany) Uli Zilg	Saint-Nom-la-Bretèche	
1985	(England) Steven Bottomley	3&2	(Italy) Luigi Figari	Saint-Nom-la-Bretèche	
1984	No tournament				
1983	(England) Steven Bottomley	2&1	(England) David Fletcher	Saint-Nom-la-Bretèche	
1982	No tournament				
1981	(England) Andrew Stubbs	2&1	(Denmark) Erik Groth-Andersen	Saint-Nom-la-Bretèche	
1980	(Scotland) Andrew Oldcorn	6&5	(Germany) Harry Goerke	Saint-Nom-la-Bretèche	
1979	(Scotland) Alastair Webster	6&5	(France) François Illouz	Saint-Nom-la-Bretèche	
1978	(Sweden) Göran Knutsson	37 holes	(England) Toby Shannon	Saint-Nom-la-Bretèche	
1977	(Scotland) Gordon Brand Jnr	2&1	(Germany) Toby Shannon	Saint-Nom-la-Bretèche	
1976	(Scotland) Greg Turner	2&1	(France) Tim Planchin	Saint-Nom-la-Bretèche	
1975	(Scotland) Gordon Brand Jnr	2&1	(England) Tim Giles	Saint-Nom-la-Bretèche	
1974	(England) Martin Poxon	6&5	(Germany) Kai Flint	Saint-Cloud	
1973	(France) Philippe Ploujoux	4&3	(France) Gilles Bourdy	Le Vaudreuil	
1972	(Portugal) José Sousa e Melo	37 holes	(France) Michel Tapia	Saint-Cloud	
1971	(France) Laurent Bailly	9&8	(France) François Natali	Saint-Germain	
1970	(France) René Darrieumerlou	6&5	(France) Patrice Léglise	Hossegor	
1969	(France) Georges Leven	38 holes	(Netherlands) Victor Swane	Vichy	
1968	(Belgium) Philippe Toussaint	8&6	(Netherlands) Victor Swane	Le Vaudreuil	
1967	(Greece) Ari Simeonoglou	1 up	(Italy) Ugo Camera	Aix-les-Bains	
1966	(France) Olivier Brizon	37 holes	(France) Jean-Charles Desbordes	Saint-Cloud	
1965	(France) Jean-Pierre Charpenel	1 up	(Germany) Veit Pagel	Aix-les-Bains	
1964	(United States) Todd Van De Hey	6&5	(France) Olivier Brizon	Évian	
1963	(France) André Coret	5&4	(France) Raymond Wattinne	Saint-Cloud	
1962	(France) André Coret	2&1	(France) Raymond Wattinne	Saint-Cloud	
1961	(France) Henri-Pierre Bonneau	3&1	(Denmark) Steffen Gruhn	Saint-Cloud	
1960	(England) N. H. Stephens	4&3	(Germany) Peter Jochums	Évian	
1959	(Sweden) Claës Jöhncke	4&2	(England) Malcolm Gregson	Saint-Cloud	
1958	(Belgium) R. Van Wyck	6&5	(Italy) Lando Sabini	Saint-Cloud	
1957	(Belgium) Freddy Rodesch	2 up	(France) Gaëtan Mourgue D'Algue	Saint-Cloud	
1956	(France) Gaëtan Mourgue D'Algue	7&6	(France) Michel Gontard	Saint-Cloud	
1955	(England) Alec Shepperson	6&5	(Denmark) Niels Thygesen	Saint-Cloud	
1954	(United States) Al Geiberger	3&1	(Denmark) Niels Thygesen	Saint-Cloud	
1953	(Denmark) Niels Thygesen	2&1	(England) Alec Shepperson	Saint-Cloud	
1952	(Spain) Luis Rezola	6&5	(France) Roger Lagarde	Saint-Cloud	
1951	(Sweden) Gustav Adolf Bielke	2 up	(Denmark) Niels Thygesen	Saint-Cloud	
1950	(France) Jean Levy-Rueff			Saint-Cloud	
1949	(France) Jean-Paul Boullot			Saint-Cloud	
1948	(France) Yves Caillol			Saint-Cloud	
1947	(England) M. Carter			Marly	
1940–46	No tournament				
1939	(France) Philippe Mallez			Saint-Cloud	
1938	(France) Jacques Larroze			Saint-Cloud	
1937	(France) Louis Murat			La Boulie	
1936	(France) Michel Boulart			Marly	
1935	(France) Philippe Boulart			Saint-Germain	
1934	(France) Pierre Maeght			Marly	
1933	(France) Jacques Petit-Leroy			Fourqueux	
1932	(France) Jean-Paul Boucheron			Marly	
1931	(France) Jean-Paul Boucheron			Marly	
1930	(France) Olivier Wormser			Saint-Cloud	
1929	(France) Henry L. Archibald			Saint-Cloud	
1928	(France) Henry L. Archibald			Saint-Cloud	
1927	(France) Georges Huet			Saint-Cloud	
1926	(France) Gratien de Gramont			Chantilly	

== See also ==
- French International Amateur Championship
