= Golf at the 2024 Summer Olympics =

Golf at the Games of the XXXIII Olympiad
- Golf logo for the 2024 Summer Olympics
- Venue: Le Golf National (Albatros Course)
- Dates: 1–4 August 2024 (men); 7–10 August 2024 (women)
- No. of events: 2 (1 men, 1 women)
- Competitors: 120 from 38 nations

The golf tournaments at the 2024 Summer Olympics in Paris ran from 1 to 10 August at Le Golf National in Guyancourt, featuring a total of 120 players (60 per gender) across two medal events. The golf qualification pathway and format for Paris remained the same as the previous two editions with 60 players qualifying for each gender-based event over a four-day-long, 72-hole individual stroke play tournament. The men's event played 1–4 August while the women's side played 7–10 August.

== Qualification ==
Sixty players for each of the men's and women's tournaments qualified for Paris 2024 based on the official IGF world ranking list of 17 June 2024 (for men) and 24 June 2024 (for women). The top 15 world-ranked golf players were selected by name and secured their Olympic places, respecting the four-player limit per NOC. The remaining spots were awarded to the players ranked sixteenth onwards on the list with a maximum of two per NOC. The IGF guaranteed that at least one golfer from the host nation and each geographical region (Africa, the Americas, Asia, Europe, and Oceania) would qualify.

== Location ==
Le Golf National in Guyancourt is the regular venue for the European Tour's Open de France, the oldest national open in Continental Europe. It hosted the respective World Amateur Team Championships for men and women, the Eisenhower Trophy and the Espirito Santo Trophy, in both 1994 and 2022. In 2018, it became the first French venue to host the Ryder Cup. Both the men's and women's events were played on the main competitive course, the Albatros Course, at par 71 for men and par 72 for women.

== Competition schedule ==
Legend
| R1 | Round 1 | R2 | Round 2 | R3 | Round 3 | FR | Final Round |

Schedule
| Event ↓ / Date → | Thu 1 | Fri 2 | Sat 3 | Sun 4 | Wed 7 | Thu 8 | Fri 9 | Sat 10 |
|---|---|---|---|---|---|---|---|---|
| Men's individual | R1 | R2 | R3 | FR | | | | |
| Women's individual | | | | | R1 | R2 | R3 | FR |

== Participating nations ==
The list shows the number of participating athletes from each nation. 38 NOCs qualified golfers.

- Argentina (2)
- Australia (4)
- Austria (3)
- Belgium (3)
- Canada (4)
- Chile (2)
- China (4)
- Chinese Taipei (4)
- Colombia (3)
- Czech Republic (2)
- Denmark (4)
- Finland (4)
- France (4)
- Germany (4)
- Great Britain (4)
- India (4)
- Ireland (4)
- Italy (3)
- Japan (4)
- Malaysia (2)
- Mexico (4)
- Morocco (1)
- Netherlands (1)
- New Zealand (3)
- Norway (4)
- Paraguay (1)
- Philippines (2)
- Poland (1)
- Puerto Rico (1)
- Singapore (1)
- Slovenia (2)
- South Africa (4)
- South Korea (5)
- Spain (4)
- Sweden (4)
- Switzerland (3)
- Thailand (4)
- United States (7)

== Medal summary ==
=== Medal table ===
* Host nation (France)

| Rank | NOC | Gold | Silver | Bronze | Total |
|---|---|---|---|---|---|
| 1 | New Zealand | 1 | 0 | 0 | 1 |
| 1 | United States | 1 | 0 | 0 | 1 |
| 3 | Germany | 0 | 1 | 0 | 1 |
| 3 | Great Britain | 0 | 1 | 0 | 1 |
| 5 | China | 0 | 0 | 1 | 1 |
| 5 | Japan | 0 | 0 | 1 | 1 |
| Totals (6 entries) | | 2 | 2 | 2 | 6 |

=== Medalists ===
| Event | Gold | Silver | Bronze |
|---|---|---|---|
| Men's individual | Scottie Scheffler; United States | Tommy Fleetwood; Great Britain | Hideki Matsuyama; Japan |
| Women's individual | Lydia Ko; New Zealand | Esther Henseleit; Germany | Lin Xiyu; China |

== See also ==
- Golf at the 2023 Pacific Games
- Golf at the 2023 Pan American Games
