= Allianz EurOpen Strasbourg =

Tournament information
- Location: Alsace, France
- Established: 1998
- Course: Golf de la Wantzenau
- Par: 72
- Length: 6,888 yards (6,298 m)
- Tours: Challenge Tour; Alps Tour
- Format: Stroke play
- Prize fund: €150,000
- Month played: September
- Final year: 2010

Tournament record score
- Aggregate: 268 Andrea Perrino (2009)
- To par: −17 Romain Wattel (2010)

Final champion
- (France) Romain Wattel
- Location in France Location in Grand Est

The Allianz EurOpen Strasbourg-Golf de la Wantzenau was a golf tournament held in Alsace, France. It was played in 2009 and 2010, and formed part of the French domestic Allianz Golf Tour.

It was a stop on the satellite Alps Tour in its inaugural year before becoming an event on the second tier Challenge Tour schedule in 2010.

== Winners ==
Year	Tour (Note: ALP − Alps Tour; CHA − Challenge Tour.)	Winner	Score	To par	Margin of victory	Runner(s)-up	Venue
Allianz EurOpen Strasbourg
2010	CHA	(France) Romain Wattel (a)	271	−17	3 strokes	(United States) Ryan Blaum (Italy) Lorenzo Gagli (England) Steven Tiley	Golf de la Wantzenau
Allianz Open de Strasbourg
2009	ALP	(Italy) Andrea Perrino	268	−16	1 stroke	(France) Thomas Fournier	Golf de Strasbourg
Open de Strasbourg
1999–2008: No tournament
1998	CHA	(Australia) John Senden	276	−12	Playoff	(England) Daren Lee	Golf de la Wantzenau
