= Le Golf National =

Golf course in Guyancourt, France

- Location in France
- 48.7532°N 2.0755°E

Club information
- Location: Guyancourt, France
- Established: 1990, 36 years ago
- Type: Private
- Tota holes: 45
- Tournaments: Open de France; 1994 Eisenhower Trophy; 2018 Ryder Cup; 2024 Olympics
- Website: golf-national.com/en/

L'Albatros
- Designed by: Hubert Chesneau; Robert Von Hagge
- Par: 71 (men) / 72 (women)
- Length: 7,331 yards (6,703 m)
- Course record: 62 – 4 players Eduardo Romero (2005); Rasmus Højgaard (2022); Nicolai Højgaard (2024); Scottie Scheffler (2024)

L'Aigle
- Par: 71
- Length: 6,224 yards (5,691 m)

L'Oislet
- Par: 32
- Length: 2,138 yards (1,955 m)

Le Golf National ([lə ɡɔlf nɑsjɔnal]) is a golf course in France, southwest of central Paris in Guyancourt. Its 18-hole L'Albatros course was designed by architects Hubert Chesneau and Robert von Hagge, in collaboration with Pierre Thevenin.

== Facilities ==
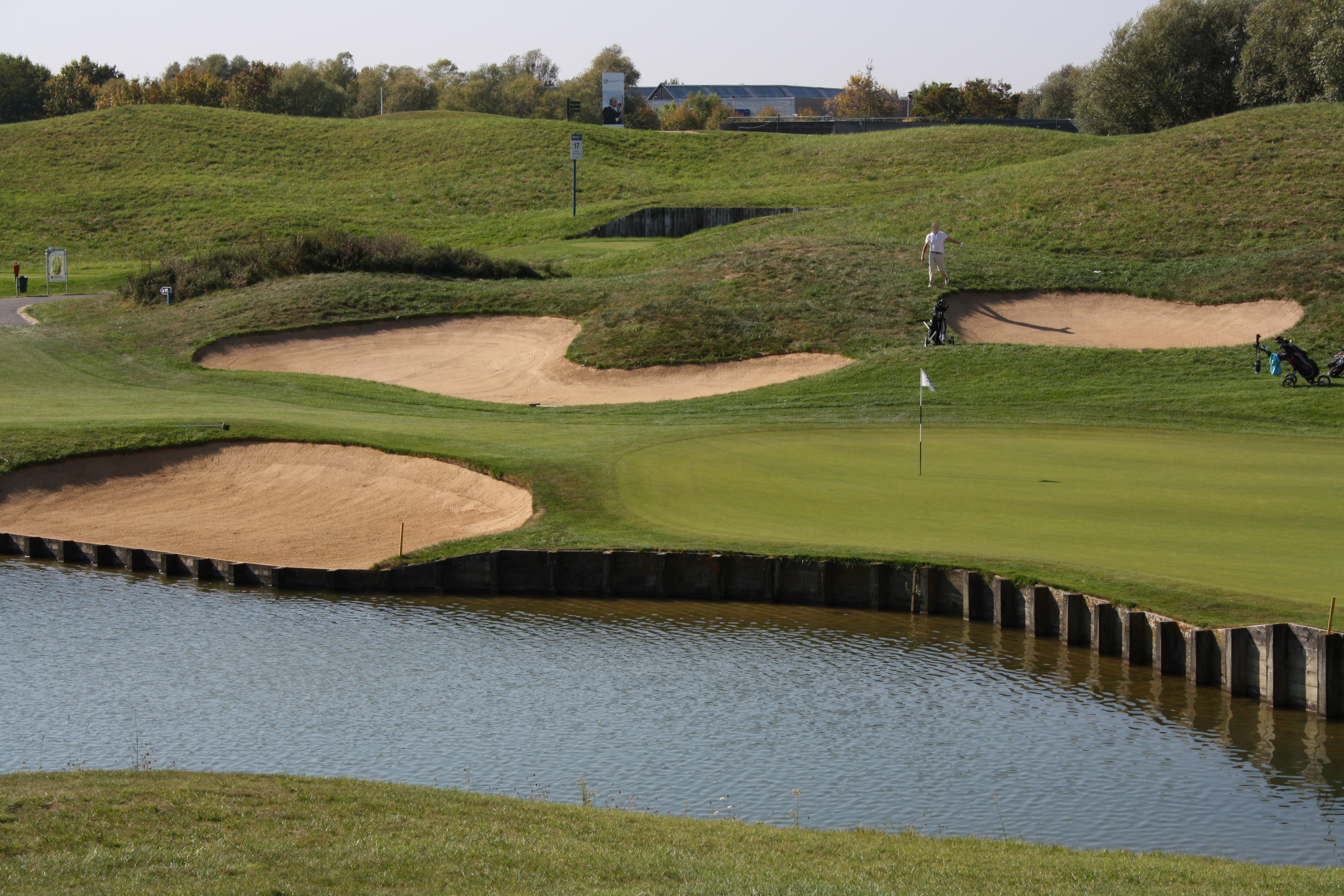
Le Golf National

Construction began in July 1987, and it debuted over three years later, on 5 October 1990, opened by Roger Bambuck, Minister of Youth and Sports.

Le Golf National has a capacity for 80,000 spectators. The Albatros (Albatross) is the main championship course, par 72 at 7,331 yards (6,703 m). The other courses are the Aigle (Eagle), par 71 and 6,224 yards (5,691 m), and the short nine-hole Oiselet (Birdie) course is par 32.

== Tournaments ==
Le Golf National hosts the Open de France on the European Tour, the oldest national open in continental Europe. First played at Le Golf National in 1991, it has been held there every year since, except on two occasions (1999, 2001).

Le Golf National became France's first venue for the Ryder Cup in 2018. It also hosted the respective World Amateur Team Championships for men and women, the Eisenhower Trophy and the Espirito Santo Trophy, in both 1994 and 2022.

It is also the venue for the golf events of the 2024 Summer Olympics. The events besides the Open de France that Le Golf National has hosted, all on the Albatros Course, are as follows:

Year	Tournament	Winner	Score	To par	Margin of victory	Runner(s)-up
1994	Eisenhower Trophy^{1}	United States	838	−23	11 strokes	Great Britain & Ireland
1994	Espirito Santo Trophy	United States	569	−7	4 strokes	South Korea
2018	Ryder Cup	Europe	17 1/2 to 10 1/2			United States
2022	Eisenhower Trophy^{2}	Italy	541	−31	1 stroke	Sweden
2022	Espirito Santo Trophy	Sweden	559	−13	Tiebreaker^{3}	United States
2024	Summer Olympic Games	(United States) Scottie Scheffler	265	−19	1 stroke	(United Kingdom) Tommy Fleetwood^{4}
2024	Summer Olympic Games	(New Zealand) Lydia Ko	278	−10	2 strokes	(Germany) Esther Henseleit^{5}

^{1} Co-hosted with La Boulie near Versailles.
^{2} Co-hosted with Golf de Saint-Nom-la-Bretèche.
^{3} Sweden won the initial tiebreaker of final round non-counting score 73 to 74.
^{4} (Japan) Hideki Matsuyama was the men's bronze medalist at 267 (−17).
^{5} (China) Lin Xiyu was the women's bronze medalist at 275 (−7).
