= Romain Wattel =

French professional golfer

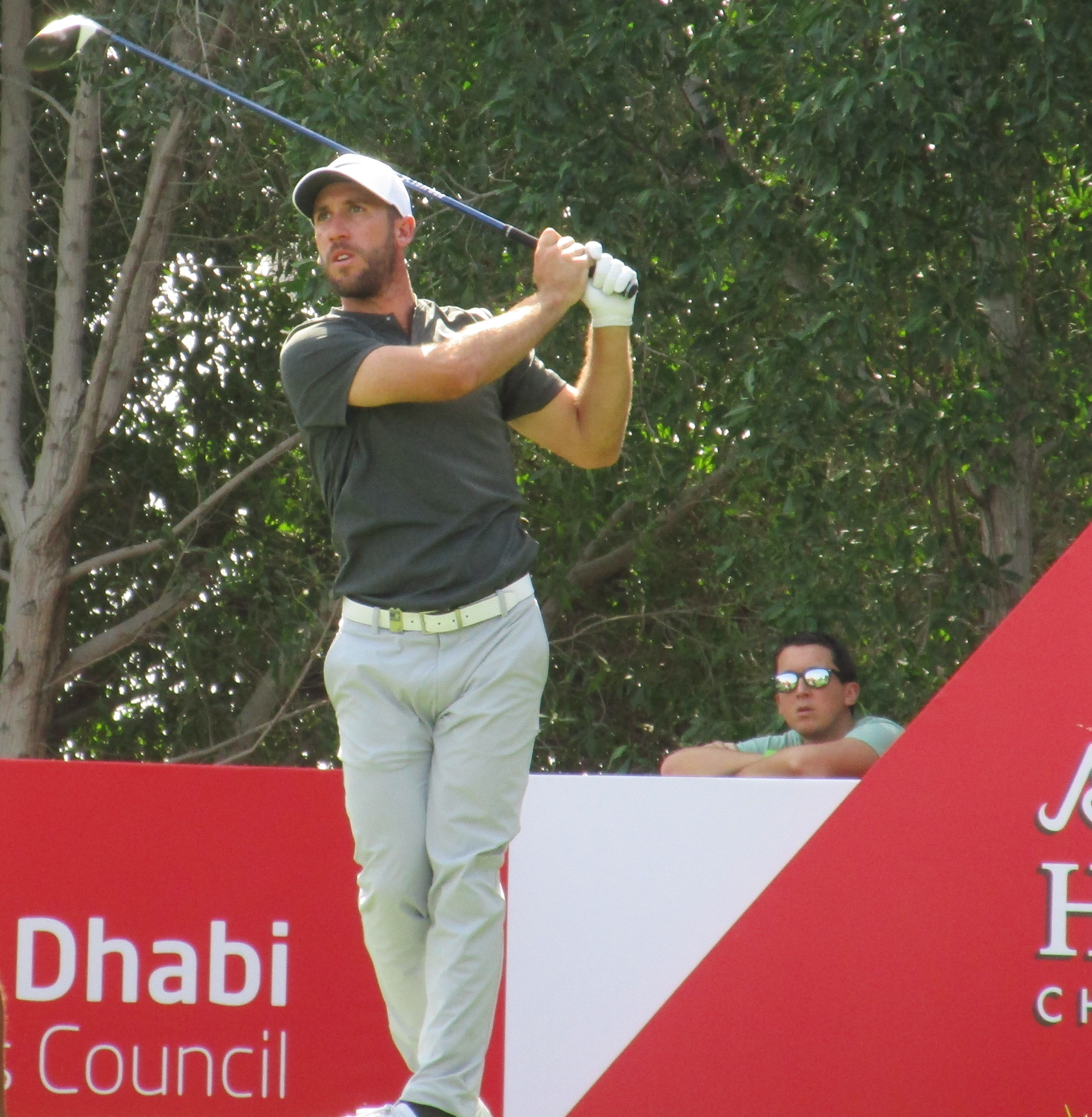
- Wattel at the 2018 Abu Dhabi HSBC Championship

Personal information
- Nationality: France
- Born: 10 January 1991 (age 35) Montpellier, France
- Height: 1.75 m (5 ft 9 in)
- Weight: 73 kg (161 lb; 11.5 st)

Career
- Sport: Golf
- Turned professional: 2010
- Current tour: European Tour
- Former tour: Challenge Tour
- Professional wins: 2
- Highest ranking: 94 (29 March 2015)

Number of wins by tour
- European Tour: 1
- Challenge Tour: 1

Best results in major championships
- Masters Tournament: DNP
- PGA Championship: DNP
- U.S. Open: 63rd: 2016
- The Open Championship: CUT: 2015

Romain Wattel (born 10 January 1991) is a French professional golfer.

== Career ==
In September 2010, Wattel became just the fifth amateur to win on the European Challenge Tour, when he captured the Allianz EurOpen Strasbourg. It was the second win by an amateur during the 2010 season following Andreas Hartø two weeks previously.

Wattel turned professional in November 2010. He established himself on the European Tour, with best performances of second at the 2012 Omega European Masters and the 2015 Trophée Hassan II.

Wattel finished 28th in the 2014 Race to Dubai. This gave him entry to the 2015 Open Championship where he missed the cut. He qualified for the 2016 U.S. Open, via sectional qualifying in May, and finished 63rd. In September 2017 he had his first win on the European Tour, winning the KLM Open by a stroke from Austin Connelly.

== Amateur wins ==
- 2008 Coupe Frayssineau-Mouchy
- 2009 Argentine Amateur Championship, Junior Orange Bowl Championship, French International Boys Championship
- 2010 Scottish Amateur Stroke Play Championship, Coupe Frayssineau-Mouchy, Scratch Players Championship

== Professional wins (3) ==
=== European Tour wins (1) ===
No.	Date	Tournament	Winning score	Margin of victory	Runner-up
1	17 Sep 2017	KLM Open	−15 (69-67-64-69=269)	1 stroke	(Canada) Austin Connelly

=== Challenge Tour wins (1) ===
No.	Date	Tournament	Winning score	Margin of victory	Runners-up
1	5 Sep 2010	Allianz EurOpen Strasbourg (as an amateur)	−17 (67-69-68-67=271)	3 strokes	(United States) Ryan Blaum, (Italy) Lorenzo Gagli, (England) Steven Tiley

=== Hi5 Pro Tour wins (1) ===
No.	Date	Tournament	Winning score	Margin of victory	Runners-up
1	11 Nov 2010	Fall Series Condado Open	−9 (70-68-69=207)	4 strokes	(Germany) Florian Fritsch, (Norway) Eirik Tage Johansen

== Results in major championships ==
Tournament	2015	2016
Masters Tournament		
U.S. Open		63
The Open Championship	CUT	
PGA Championship		

Did not play

CUT = missed the halfway cut
"T" = tied

== Team appearances ==
Amateur

- European Boys' Team Championship (representing France): 2007, 2008, 2009
- Jacques Léglise Trophy (representing the Continent of Europe): 2008, 2009
- European Amateur Team Championship (representing France): 2009, 2010
- Bonallack Trophy (representing Europe): 2010 (selected, but tournament cancelled)
- St Andrews Trophy (representing the Continent of Europe): 2010 (winners)
- Eisenhower Trophy (representing France): 2010 (winners)

== See also ==
- 2010 European Tour Qualifying School graduates
