= Hôtel de Ville, Guyancourt =

Town hall in Guyancourt, France

Hôtel de Ville
- The main frontage of the Hôtel de Ville in August 2004
- Interactive map of the Hôtel de Ville area

General information
- Type: City hall
- Architectural style: Modern style
- Location: Guyancourt, France
- Coordinates: 48.7707°N 2.0704°E
- Completed: 1995

Design and construction
- Architect: Edmond Bonnefoy

The Hôtel de Ville (French pronunciation: [otɛl də vil], City Hall) is a municipal building in Guyancourt, Yvelines, in the western suburbs of Paris, standing on Rue Ambroise-Croizat.

== History ==
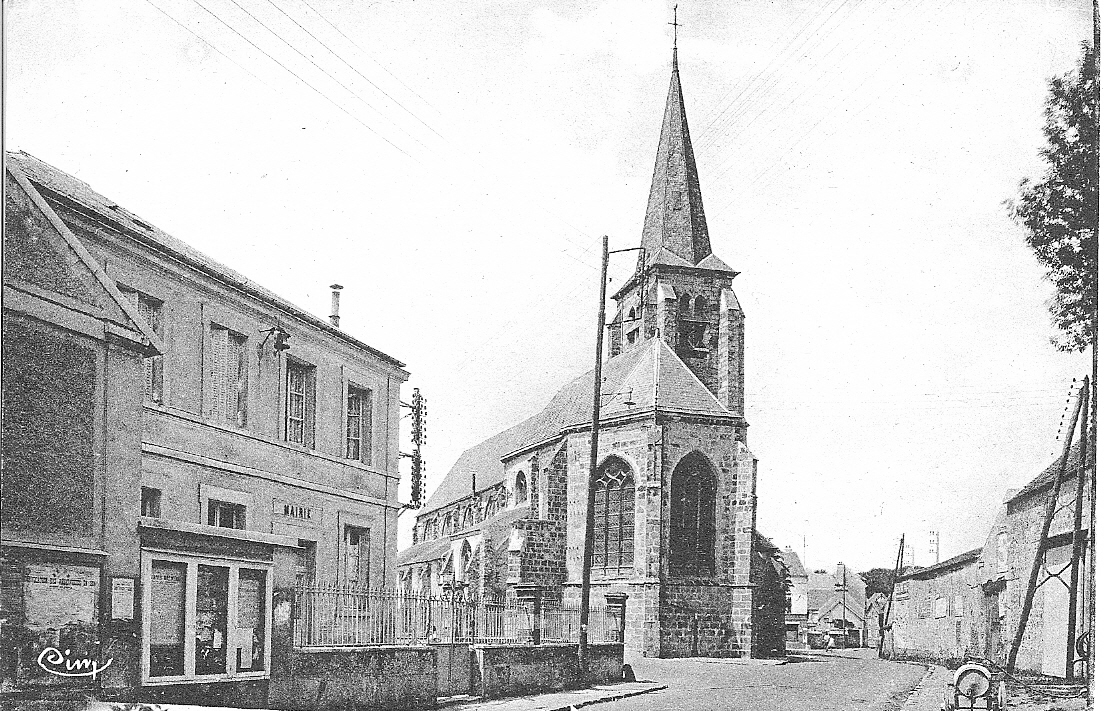
The old town hall (on the left) with the Church of Saint-Victor behind

The earliest public building in the town was the Maison Dieu which was established by the local seigneur, Renaud de Guyancourt, in the early 13th century. However, in the mid-14th century, the seigneur gave it to one of his illegitimate sons and it ceased providing any useful public service. The Maison Dieu was reopened as a hospital in the late 17th century and, by the early 19th century, it was also being used as a school. However, by the mid-19th century, it was in a dilapidated condition and the town council decided to commission a combined town hall and school. The site they selected was to the immediate southeast of the Church of Saint-Victor. The new building was designed by Sieur Blondel in the neoclassical style, built by Messrs Folain in brick with a cement render finish and was completed in 1859.

The design involved an asymmetrical main frontage of five bays facing onto what is now Rue Ambroise-Croizat. There was a doorway in the second bay on the right. It was fenestrated by casement windows with stone surrounds on both floors and there was a cornice at roof level. A plaque to commemorate the lives of local people who died in the First World War was unveiled at the town hall in July 1921, but was later relocated to the local cemetery. During the Second World War, the German authorities administered the town from the town hall from June 1940 until the town was liberated by allied troops on 24 August 1944.

In the late 1970s, following significant population growth, the council decided to commission a modern town hall. The site they selected was former farmland just behind the old town hall. The new building was designed by Edmond Bonnefoy in the modern style, built in stone, glass and aluminium and was officially opened by the prefect of Yvelines, Claude Érignac, on 28 June 1995.

The design involved two triangular-shaped wings, one pointing north and one pointing east. At the corner, where the two wings met, there was a tower with a glass entrance on the ground floor and a flagpole on the roof. The wings were fenestrated with full-height square-shaped windows which were decorated in a grid pattern by aluminium strips. Internally, the principal room was the Salle du Conseil (council chamber).
