= Egyptian Open =

National open golf tournament of Egypt

Tournament information
- Location: Cairo, Egypt
- Established: 1921
- Course: Madinaty Golf Club
- Par: 70
- Length: 6,900 yards (6,300 m)
- Organized by: Egyptian Golf Federation
- Tours: Challenge Tour; Asian Development Tour
- Format: Stroke play
- Prize fund: US$125,000
- Month played: October/November

Tournament record score
- Aggregate: 266 Niklas Regner (2025)
- To par: −14 as above

Current champion
- (Austria) Niklas Regner

Final champion
- Location in Egypt

The Egyptian Open is the national open golf tournament of Egypt. It was first played in 1921 and is the oldest professional competition in the Middle East.

== History ==
During the early 1950s, it was contested by many of the world's leading golfers, with winners including Bobby Locke and Bernard Hunt.

In 2009, the tournament once again attracted an international field including eight time European Tour Order of Merit winner and captain of the 2010 European Ryder Cup team Colin Montgomerie. During the event, it was announced that a deal had been signed which would see the Egyptian Open become an event on the second tier Challenge Tour for a minimum of three years from 2010. The Challenge Tour last visited Egypt in 2004 for the Al Ahram-Jolie Ville Sharm El Sheikh Challenge.

In 2025, the event returned to a professional tour, being played on the Asian Development Tour and hosted at Madinaty Golf Club in Cairo.

== Winners ==
| Year | Tour (Note: ADT − Asian Development Tour; CHA − Challenge Tour.) | Winner | Score | To par | Margin of victory | Runner(s)-up | Venue | Ref. |
|---|---|---|---|---|---|---|---|---|
| 2025 | ADT | (Austria) Niklas Regner | 266 | −14 | 2 strokes | (Philippines) Carl Jano Corpus (Thailand) Poom Pattaropong (Thailand) Tawit Polthai | Madinaty | |
2011–2024: No tournament
| 2010 | CHA | (Chile) Mark Tullo | 275 | −13 | 1 stroke | (Netherlands) Floris de Vries (Scotland) George Murray | Mirage City | |
| 2009 | | (England) Steven Tiley | 275 | −13 | 4 strokes | (Denmark) Thorbjørn Olesen | Mirage City | |
| 2008 | | (Egypt) Amr Abu El Ela (12) | | | | | | |
| 2007 | | (Sweden) Calle Carlsson (2) | | | | | Dreamland | |
| 2006 | | (Egypt) Ayman Mahmoud | | | | | | |
| 2005 | | (Sweden) Calle Carlsson | | | | | | |
| 2004 | | (Egypt) Amr Abu El Ela (11) | | | | | | |
| 2003 | | (Egypt) Amr Zaki | | | | | | |
| 2002 | | (Egypt) Amr Abu El Ela (10) | | | | | | |
| 2001 | | (Egypt) Amr Abu El Ela (9) | | | | | | |
2000: No tournament
| 1999 | | (Egypt) Amr Abu El Ela (8) | | | | | | |
| 1998 | | (Egypt) Amr Abu El Ela (7) | | | | | | |
| 1997 | | (Egypt) Amr Abu El Ela (6) | | | | | | |
1995–96: No tournament
| 1994 | | (Egypt) Amr Abu El Ela (5) | | | | | | |
| 1993 | | (Egypt) Raouf Mahrous | | | | | | |
| 1992 | | (Egypt) Amr Abu El Ela (4) | | | | | | |
| 1991 | | (Egypt) Amr Abu El Ela (3) | | | | | | |
| 1990 | | (Egypt) Amr Abu El Ela (2) | | | | | | |
| 1989 | | (Egypt) Amr Abu El Ela | | | | | | |
| 1988 | | (Egypt) Ramy Taher (3) | | | | | | |
| 1987 | | (Egypt) Mohamed Said Moussa (23) | | | | | | |
| 1986 | | (Egypt) Mohamed Said Moussa (22) | | | | | | |
| 1985 | | (Egypt) Abdel Halim Kahoul (2) | | | | | | |
| 1984 | | (Egypt) Ramy Taher (2) | | | | | | |
| 1983 | | (Egypt) Ramy Taher | | | | | | |
| 1982 | | (Egypt) Mohamed Said Moussa (21) | | | | | | |
| 1981 | | (Egypt) Mohamed Said Moussa (20) | | | | | | |
| 1980 | | (Egypt) Mohamed Said Moussa (19) | | | | | | |
| 1979 | | (Egypt) Mohamed Said Moussa (18) | | | | | | |
| 1978 | | (Egypt) Mohamed Said Moussa (17) | | | | | | |
| 1977 | | (Egypt) Mohamed Said Moussa (16) | | | | | | |
| 1976 | | (Egypt) Mohamed Said Moussa (15) | | | | | | |
| 1975 | | (Egypt) Mohamed Said Moussa (14) | | | | | | |
| 1974 | | (Egypt) Mohamed Said Moussa (13) | | | | | | |
| 1973 | | (Egypt) Mohamed Said Moussa (12) | | | | | | |
| 1972 | | (Egypt) Mohamed Said Moussa (11) | | | | | | |
| 1971 | | (Egypt) Mohamed Said Moussa (10) | | | | | | |
| 1970 | | (Egypt) Mohamed Said Moussa (9) | 276 | | | | Alexandria | |
| 1969 | | (Egypt) Mohamed Said Moussa (8) | 285 | | | | | |
| 1968 | | (Egypt) Cherif El-Sayed Cherif (2) | 269 | | | | Alexandria | |
| 1967 | | (Egypt) Abdel Halim Kahoul (2) | 281 | | | | Alexandria | |
| 1966 | | (Egypt) Mohamed Said Moussa (7) | 274 | | | | Alexandria | |
| 1965 | | (Egypt) Mohamed Said Moussa (6) | 284 | | | | Alexandria | |
| 1964 | | (Egypt) Mohamed Said Moussa (5) | 276 | | | | Alexandria | |
| 1963 | | (Egypt) Abdel Halim Kahoul | 280 | | | | Alexandria | |
| 1962 | | (Egypt) Mohamed Said Moussa (4) | 282 | | | | Alexandria | |
| 1961 | | (Egypt) Mohamed Said Moussa (3) | 282 | | | | Alexandria | |
| 1960 | | (Egypt) Mohamed Said Moussa (2) | 286 | | | | Heliopolis | |
| 1959 | | (Egypt) Cherif El-Sayed Cherif | 289 | | | | Alexandria | |
| 1958 | | (Egypt) Mohamed Said Moussa | | | | | Heliopolis | |
1957: No tournament
| 1956 | | (England) Bernard Hunt | 281 | | 1 stroke | (South Africa) Bobby Locke | Cairo | |
| 1955 | | (Egypt) Khattab Hassan (3) | | | | | | |
| 1954 | | (South Africa) Bobby Locke | 274 | | 15 strokes | (Wales) Dai Rees | Cairo | |
| 1953 | | (Egypt) Naaman Aly | | | | | | |
| 1952 | | (Egypt) Hassan Hassanein (4) | | | | | Cairo | |
| 1951 | | (Egypt) Hassan Hassanein (3) | 283 | | | | Cairo | |
| 1950 | | (Egypt) Hassan Hassanein (2) | 276 | | | | Alexandria | |
| 1949 | | (Egypt) Hassan Hassanein | 284 | | | | Cairo | |
| 1948 | | (Egypt) Khattab Hassan (2) | 280 | | | | Alexandria | |
| 1947 | | (Egypt) Khattab Hassan | 309 | | | | Smouha | |
| 1946 | | (England) John Plant (a) | 303 | | | | Cairo | |
| 1945 | | (Scotland) James Wynne (4) | 305 | | | | Cairo | |
1940–1944: No tournament
| 1939 | | (England) Mike Gardner (a) | 305 | | | | New Sports Club | |
| 1938 | | (England) Ralph Moffitt (7) | 302 | | 4 strokes | (England) F. T. Haddock (a) | Alexandria | |
| 1937 | | (Scotland) James Wynne (3) | 297 | | Playoff | (England) Ralph Moffitt | Cairo | |
| 1936 | | (Scotland) James Wynne (2) | 297 | | 10 strokes | | Alexandria | |
| 1935 | | (England) Ralph Moffitt (6) | 297 | | | | Cairo | |
| 1934 | | (Scotland) James Wynne | 297 | | | | Alexandria | |
| 1933 | | (England) Ralph Moffitt (5) | 287 | | | | Cairo | |
| 1932 | | (England) Ralph Moffitt (4) | 289 | | | | Cairo | |
| 1931 | | P. D. Miller (a) | 287 | | | | Cairo | |
| 1930 | | (England) Ralph Moffitt (3) | 298 | | | | Alexandria | |
| 1929 | | (England) Ralph Moffitt (2) | | | | | | |
| 1928 | | (England) Ralph Moffitt | | | | | | |
| 1927 | | F. H. Hayward (a) | | | | | | |
| 1926 | | J. G. Kerr | | | | | | |
| 1925 | | M. W. J. Hime (a) | | | | | | |
| 1924 | | P. A. Wood | | | | | | |
| 1923 | | T. L. C. Heald (a) | | | | | | |
| 1922 | | (England) Edmund Forrest | | | | | | |
| 1921 | | G. R. Kinder (a) | | | | | | |

== See also ==
- Open golf tournament
