= Tom Odams =

English golfer (1907–1989)

Thomas Elliott Odams (7 April 1907 – 4 March 1989) was an English professional golfer. Odams is remembered for being runner-up in the 1939 Open de France and a semi-finalist in the 1945 News of the World Matchplay.

== Early life ==
Odams was born in Wimbledon, Surrey in 1907, the son of Stanley George Odams.

== Golf career ==
Odams played for England boys against Scotland in 1923.

The 1939 Open de France was played at Le Touquet on 24 and 25 May. Odams had rounds of 71 and 70 and led by 2 strokes after the first day. A third round 69 on the second morning gave Odams a six shot lead but he scored 76 in the afternoon and was beaten by a stroke by the Argentine golfer Martin Pose who had a last round of 68.

His best finish in The Open Championship was finishing 31st in the 1947 Open Championship. He missed the cut in 1938 and 1949, his only other appearances.

In 1945 he reached the semi-final of the News of the World Matchplay losing at the final hole. He won the Southern Professional Championship in 1953.

Before World War II, Odams was assistant to Henry Cotton in Belgium and, later, professional at Royal Ghent. While there, he won the Belgian Professional Championship on two occasions, in 1932 and 1934. After the war he was professional at Grim's Dyke Golf Club.

== Death ==
Odams died in Seaton, Devon on 4 March 1989 aged 81.

== Tournament wins ==
- 1932 Belgian Professional Championship
- 1934 Belgian Professional Championship
- 1953 Southern Professional championship

== Results in major championships ==
Tournament	1938	1939	1940	1941	1942	1943	1944	1945	1946	1947	1948	1949
The Open Championship	CUT		NT	NT	NT	NT	NT	NT		31		CUT

Note: Odams only played in The Open Championship.

Did not play

NT = No tournament
CUT = missed the half-way cut
