= Golf de Saint-Cloud =

Golf course in France

- Location in France
- 48.8526°N 2.1885°E

Club information
- Location: Garches, France
- Established: 1913, 113 years ago
- Type: Private
- Tota holes: 36
- Tournaments: Open de France; French International Lady Juniors Amateur Championship
- Website: golfdesaintcloud.com

Vert Course
- Designed by: Harry Colt
- Par: 71
- Length: 5,894 metres (6,446 yd)

Jaune Course
- Designed by: Harry Colt; John S.F. Morrison
- Par: 67
- Length: 4,824 metres (5,276 yd)

Golf de Saint-Cloud is a 36-hole golf complex located in the parishes of Garches, Rueil-Malmaison and Vaucresson, 12 km west of central Paris, France.

== History ==
Opened in 1913 and designed by well renowned English golf course designer Harry Shapland Colt, the Vert or Green course is a championship course commissioned by Saint-Cloud's then owner, an American lawyer named Henry Cachard. The Estate was previously owned by Empress Joséphine, Napoleon's wife.

In January 1871, the bloody Battle of Buzenval, which the Prussians won, was fought on the 15th fairway. During the battle, the painter Henri Regnault, aged 27, was killed, and a bust erected in his honor still sits on hole 14. Hole 8 in particular offers a view of the Eiffel Tower.

The Jaune or Yellow course, par-67, was added in 1930 and designed by Colt and his associate John S.F. Morrison.

From April 1983, President François Mitterrand played nine holes with Jacques Attali at Saint-Cloud most Monday mornings.

== Tournaments ==
Saint-Cloud has been home to the French International Lady Juniors Amateur Championship since 1927. It hosted the Open de France, the oldest national open in continental Europe, 13 times between 1926 and 1987.

=== Professional ===
Year	Tour	Tournament	Winner(s)
1926		16th Open de France	(Jersey) Aubrey Boomer
1932		22nd Open de France	(England) Arthur Lacey
1946		30th Open de France	(England) Henry Cotton
1948		32nd Open de France	(France) Firmin Cavalo Jr.
1951		35th Open de France	(Egypt) Hassan Hassanein
1954		38th Open de France	(Belgium) Flory Van Donck
1957		41st Open de France	(Belgium) Flory Van Donck
1960		44th Open de France	(Argentina) Roberto De Vicenzo
1963		47th Open de France	(Australia) Bruce Devlin
1968		52nd Open de France	(England) Peter Butler
1980	EUR	64th Open de France	(Australia) Greg Norman
1984	EUR	68th Open de France	(West Germany) Bernhard Langer
1985	LET	Hennessy Cognac Ladies Cup	(Australia) Jan Stephenson
1987	EUR	71st Open de France	(Spain) José Rivero
1994	EUR	Tournoi Perrier de Paris	(England) Peter Baker & (England) David J. Russell
1995	EUR	Tournoi Perrier de Paris	(Spain) Seve Ballesteros & (Spain) José María Olazábal
2021	EST	Legends Open de France	(France) Thomas Levet

=== Amateur ===
- French International Lady Juniors Amateur Championship – 1927–
- Vagliano Trophy – 1936 · 1947
- St Andrews Trophy – 1958
- European Ladies' Team Championship – 1975
