= Daren Lee =

English golfer

Personal information
- Full name: Daren Lee
- Nationality: England
- Born: 10 January 1965 (age 61) London, England
- Height: 5 ft 11 in (1.80 m)

Career
- Sport: Golf
- Turned professional: 1992
- Former tours: European Tour; Challenge Tour

Best results in major championships
- Masters Tournament: DNP
- PGA Championship: DNP
- U.S. Open: DNP
- The Open Championship: T68: 1992

Daren Lee (born 10 January 1965) is an English professional golfer.

== Career ==
Lee was born in London. He won the silver medal as the leading amateur in The Open Championship at Muirfield in 1992. He turned professional later that year and played on the European Tour and its second tier Challenge Tour between 1993 and 2003. His best finish on the European Tour Order of Merit was 45th in 2001, the only year he made the top 100.

Strangely for a professional golfer, Lee never played a practice round prior to a tournament, instead preferring to simply walk the course.

== Playoff record ==
European Tour playoff record (0–1)

No.	Year	Tournament	Opponents	Result
1	2001	Celtic Manor Resort Wales Open	(Scotland) Paul Lawrie, (Republic of Ireland) Paul McGinley	McGinley won with par on fifth extra hole Lawrie eliminated by par on second hole

Challenge Tour playoff record (0–1)

No.	Year	Tournament	Opponent	Result
1	1998	Open de Strasbourg	(Australia) John Senden	Lost to birdie on first extra hole

== Results in major championships ==
Tournament	1992	1993	1994	1995	1996	1997	1998	1999	2000	2001
The Open Championship	T68 LA						CUT			CUT

Note: Lee only played in The Open Championship.

Did not play

LA = Low amateur
CUT = missed the half-way cut
"T" = tied
