= Open de France =

European Tour golf tournament

Coordinates: 48.7522°N 2.0851°E

FedEx Open de France
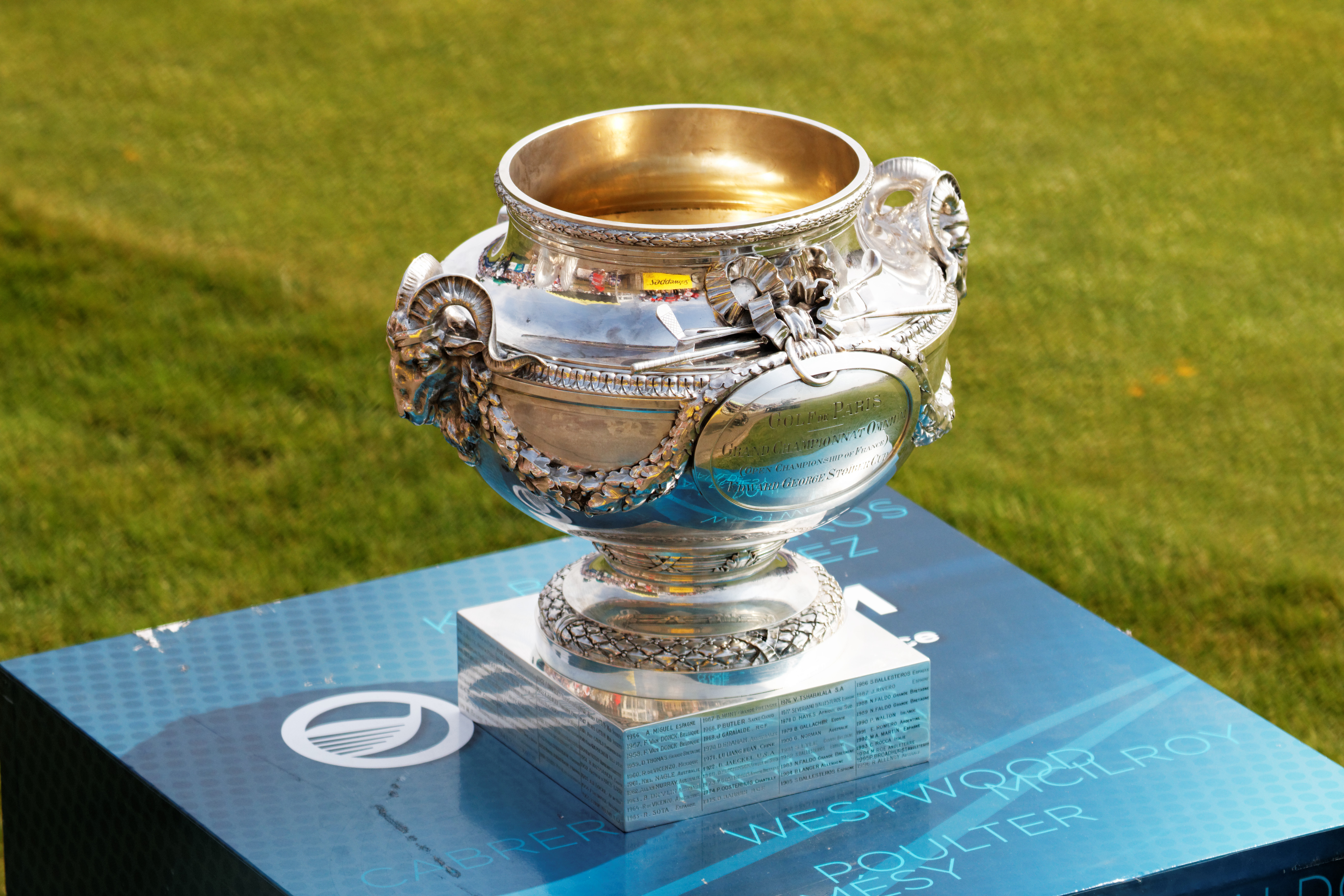

Tournament information
- Location: Saint-Nom-la-Bretèche, France
- Established: 1906
- Course: Golf de Saint-Nom-la-Bretèche
- Par: 71
- Length: 6,977 yards (6,380 m)
- Tour: European Tour
- Format: Stroke play
- Prize fund: US$3,250,000
- Month played: September

Tournament record score
- Aggregate: 262 Lu Liang-Huan (1971)
- To par: −21 Seve Ballesteros (1985)

Current champion
- (England) Matt Fitzpatrick

Location map
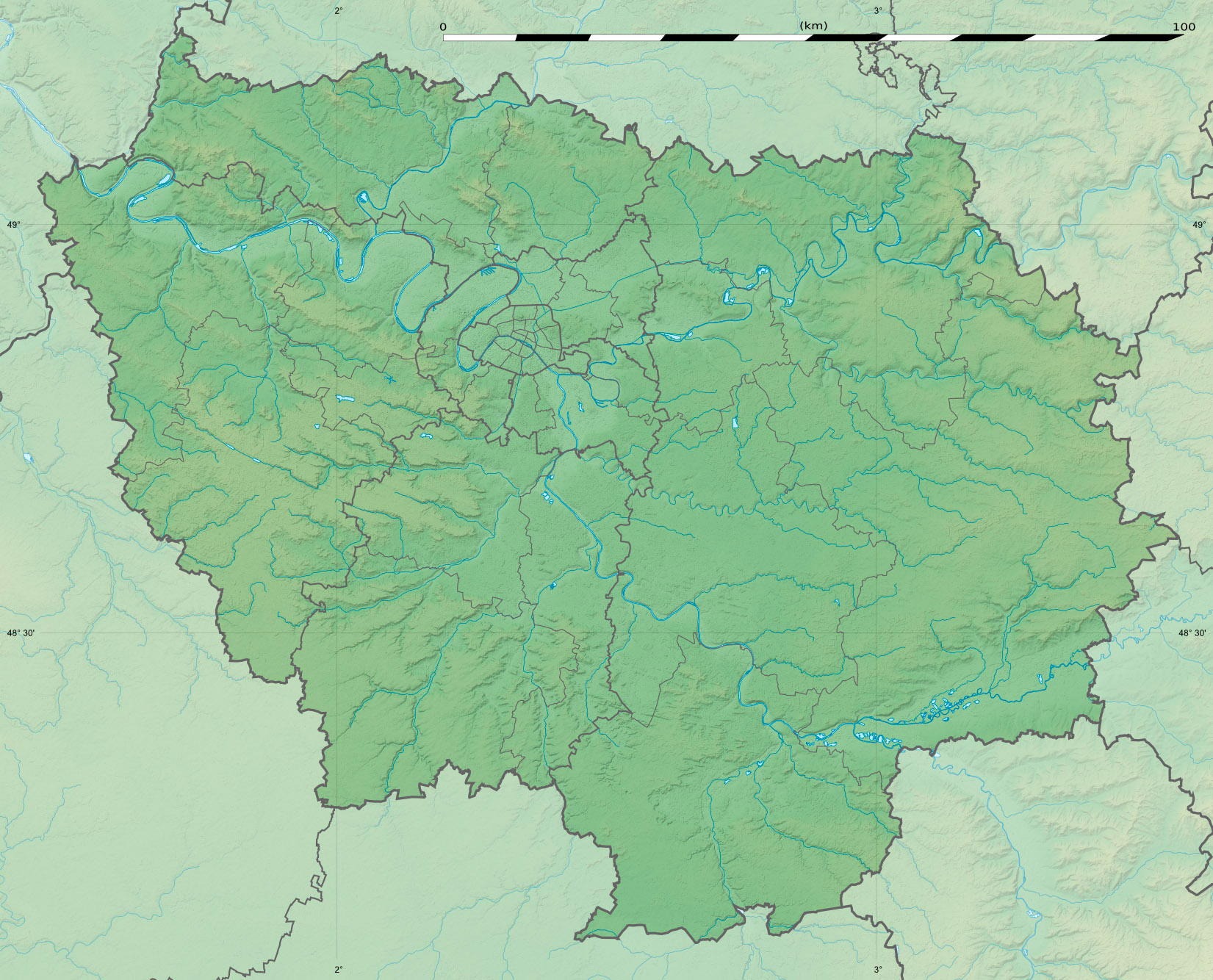
- Location in France Location in Île-de-France

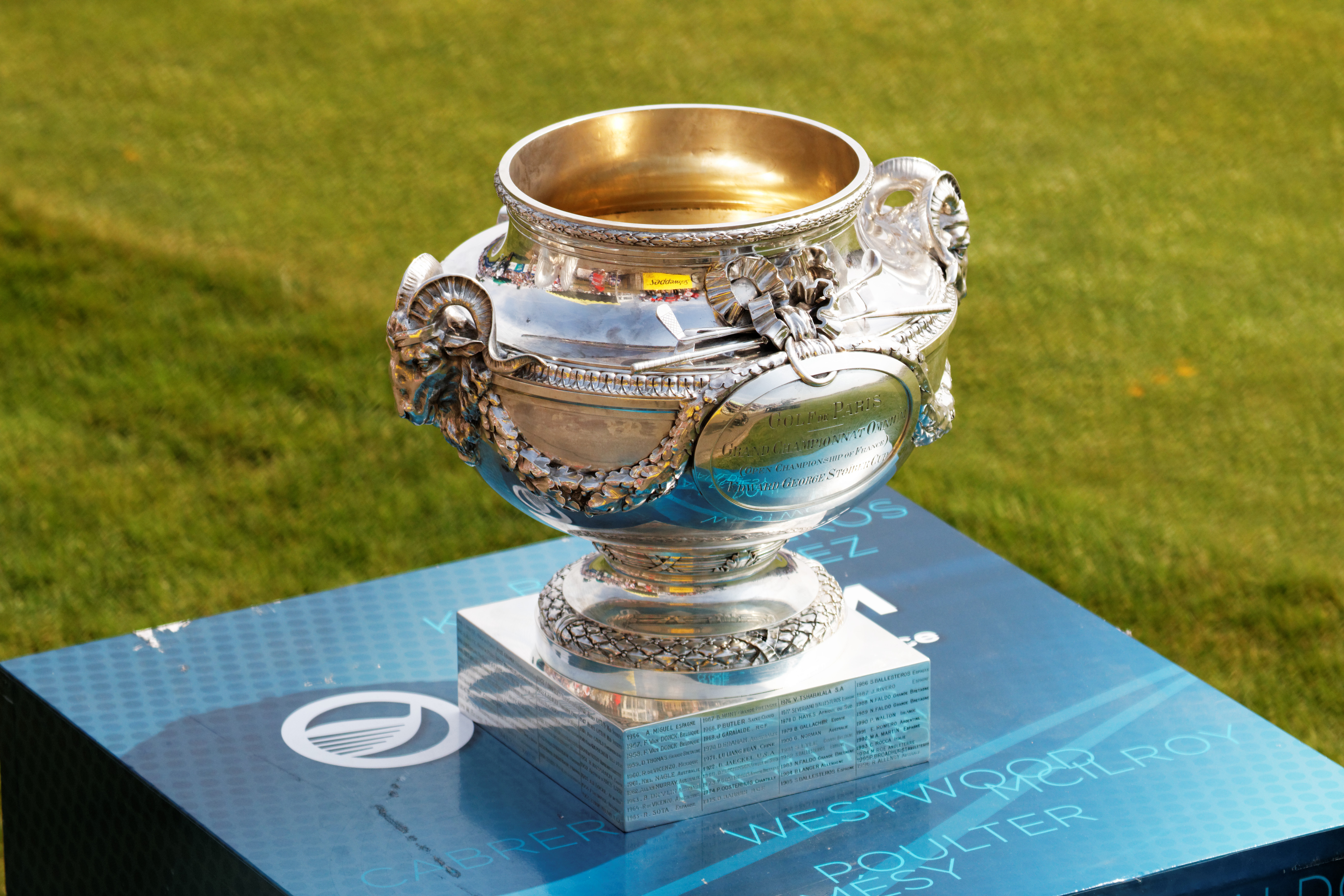
Open de France Trophy

The Open de France is a European Tour golf tournament. Inaugurated in 1906 it is the oldest national open in Continental Europe and has been part of the European Tour's schedule since the tour's inception in 1972. The 100th edition of the event was held in 2016. The 2022 edition took place between 22 and 25 September on the Golf National course. There was €3 million of prize fund. Previous edition played was the 2019 tournament, won by Nicolas Colsaerts.

Originally played at La Boulie, the tournament has been hosted by many different venues, but since 1991, it has been held at the Le Golf National near Paris every year except for 1999 and 2001.

Since the turn of the millennium, the Fédération Française de Golf has made a concerted effort to enhance the stature of the event. In 2004 qualifying tournaments were introduced on the model of those for The Open Championship and the U.S. Open and were open to professionals and amateurs. The prize fund rose from €865,000 in 1999 to €4 million from 2006 to 2009, putting the Open de France in the top group of European Tour events (excluding the majors and the World Golf Championships, which are co-sanctioned by the U.S.-based PGA Tour). The prize fund was €3 million in 2015 and €3.5 million in 2016. It rose to US$7,000,000 in 2017 after joining the new Rolex Series. However the main sponsor of 2017 and 2018 editions: HNA decided to cancel its budget. In 2019, the tournament took place in October. Since then it has no longer been a Rolex Series event. From 2014 to 2018, it was one of the Open Qualifying Series events for The Open Championship with the leading three (four in 2016) players, who had not already qualified, qualifying for the Open. With a new sponsor for 2022 (Cazoo) the prize fund was €3,000,000. Since 2024, Memphis, Tennessee (United States) sponsor FedEx took over sponsorship.

== Venues ==
Venue	Location	First	Last	Times
Racing Club de France La Boulie	Versailles	1906	1986	20
Golf de Chantilly	Chantilly, Oise	1913	1990	11
Golf du Touquet	Le Touquet	1914	1977	6
Golf de Dieppe Pourville	Dieppe	1923	1934	3
Golf de Saint-Cloud	Saint-Cloud	1926	1987	13
Golf de Saint-Germain	Saint-Germain-en-Laye	1927	1985	9
Golf de Fourqueux	Fourqueux	1929	1938	2
Golf Barrière de Deauville	Deauville	1931	1956	2
Golf de Saint-Nom-la-Bretèche	Saint-Nom-la-Bretèche	1965	2025	4
Golf de Chantaco	Saint-Jean-de-Luz	1970	1970	1
Golf de Biarritz-Le Phare	Biarritz	1971	1971	1 (+2)
Golf de la Nivelle	Saint-Jean-de-Luz	1972	1972	1 (+1)
Golf de la Baule	La Baule-Escoublac	1978	1978	1
Golf Club de Lyon	Lyon	1979	2001	2
Le Golf National	Saint-Quentin-en-Yvelines	1991	2024	30
Golf du Médoc	Le Pian-Médoc	1999	1999	1

From 1970 to 1973 the first two rounds were played on two different courses, everyone playing one round on each course. After the cut, one of the courses was then used for the final two rounds. In 1970 Chantaco and Biarritz-Le Phare were used, with the final two rounds played at Chantaco. In 1971 La Nivelle and Biarritz-Le Phare were used, with the final two rounds played at Biarritz-Le Phare. In 1972 La Nivelle and Biarritz-Le Phare were used, with the final two rounds played at La Nivelle. In 1973, two courses at La Boulie were used, La Foret and La Vallee, with the final two rounds played on La Vallee.

== Winners ==
European Tour (Rolex Series)	2017–2018
European Tour (Regular)	1972–2016, 2019−
Pre-European Tour	1906–1971

#	Year	Winner	Score	To par	Margin of victory	Runner(s)-up	Venue
FedEx Open de France
108th	2026	(England) Matt Fitzpatrick	264	−20	3 strokes	(Spain) Ángel Hidalgo	Le Golf National
107th	2025	(United States) Michael Kim	268	−16	1 stroke	(France) Jeong-Weon Ko (Australia) Elvis Smylie	Saint-Nom-la-Bretèche
106th	2024	(England) Dan Bradbury	268	−16	1 stroke	(England) Sam Bairstow (Denmark) Thorbjørn Olesen (Germany) Yannik Paul (Denmark) Jeff Winther	Le Golf National
Cazoo Open de France
105th	2023	(Japan) Ryo Hisatsune	270	−14	2 strokes	(England) Jordan Smith (Denmark) Jeff Winther	Le Golf National
104th	2022	(Italy) Guido Migliozzi	268	−16	1 stroke	(Denmark) Rasmus Højgaard	Le Golf National
Open de France
–	2021	Cancelled due to the COVID-19 pandemic					
–	2020	Cancelled due to the COVID-19 pandemic					
Amundi Open de France
103rd	2019	(Belgium) Nicolas Colsaerts	272	−12	1 stroke	(Denmark) Joachim B. Hansen	Le Golf National
HNA Open de France
102nd	2018	(Sweden) Alex Norén	277	−7	1 stroke	(Scotland) Russell Knox (United States) Julian Suri (England) Chris Wood	Le Golf National
101st	2017	(England) Tommy Fleetwood	272	−12	1 stroke	(United States) Peter Uihlein	Le Golf National
Open de France
100th	2016	(Thailand) Thongchai Jaidee	273	−11	4 strokes	(Italy) Francesco Molinari	Le Golf National
Alstom Open de France
99th	2015	(Austria) Bernd Wiesberger	271	−13	3 strokes	(England) James Morrison	Le Golf National
98th	2014	(Northern Ireland) Graeme McDowell (2)	279	−5	1 stroke	(Thailand) Thongchai Jaidee (United States) Kevin Stadler	Le Golf National
97th	2013	(Northern Ireland) Graeme McDowell	275	−9	4 strokes	(South Africa) Richard Sterne	Le Golf National
96th	2012	(Germany) Marcel Siem	276	−8	1 stroke	(Italy) Francesco Molinari	Le Golf National
95th	2011	(France) Thomas Levet	277	−7	1 stroke	(England) Mark Foster (Denmark) Thorbjørn Olesen	Le Golf National
94th	2010	(Spain) Miguel Ángel Jiménez	273	−11	Playoff	(Spain) Alejandro Cañizares (Italy) Francesco Molinari	Le Golf National
Open de France Alstom
93rd	2009	(Germany) Martin Kaymer	271	−13	Playoff	(England) Lee Westwood	Le Golf National
92nd	2008	(Spain) Pablo Larrazábal	269	−15	4 strokes	(Scotland) Colin Montgomerie	Le Golf National
91st	2007	(England) Graeme Storm	277	−7	1 stroke	(Denmark) Søren Hansen	Le Golf National
90th	2006	(England) John Bickerton	273	−11	1 stroke	(Republic of Ireland) Pádraig Harrington	Le Golf National
Open de France
89th	2005	(France) Jean-François Remésy (2)	273	−11	Playoff	(France) Jean van de Velde	Le Golf National
88th	2004	(France) Jean-François Remésy	272	−12	7 strokes	(Australia) Richard Green (Australia) Nick O'Hern	Le Golf National
87th	2003	(England) Philip Golding	273	−15	1 stroke	(England) David Howell	Le Golf National
Novotel Perrier Open de France
86th	2002	(England) Malcolm MacKenzie	274	−14	1 stroke	(South Africa) Trevor Immelman	Le Golf National
85th	2001	(Spain) José María Olazábal	268	−12	2 strokes	(England) Paul Eales (Italy) Costantino Rocca (New Zealand) Greg Turner	Lyon
84th	2000	(Scotland) Colin Montgomerie	272	−16	2 strokes	(England) Jonathan Lomas	Le Golf National
83rd	1999	(South Africa) Retief Goosen (2)	272	−12	Playoff	(New Zealand) Greg Turner	Médoc
Peugeot Open de France
82nd	1998	(Scotland) Sam Torrance	276	−12	2 strokes	(France) Olivier Edmond (Italy) Massimo Florioli (Australia) Mathew Goggin (Germany) Bernhard Langer	Le Golf National
81st	1997	(South Africa) Retief Goosen	271	−17	3 strokes	(England) Jamie Spence	Le Golf National
80th	1996	(Australia) Robert Allenby	272	−16	Playoff	(Germany) Bernhard Langer	Le Golf National
79th	1995	(England) Paul Broadhurst	274	−14	8 strokes	(England) Neal Briggs	Le Golf National
78th	1994	(England) Mark Roe	274	−14	1 stroke	(Sweden) Gabriel Hjertstedt	Le Golf National
77th	1993	(Italy) Costantino Rocca	273	−11	Playoff	(Republic of Ireland) Paul McGinley	Le Golf National
76th	1992	(Spain) Miguel Ángel Martín	276	−8	2 strokes	(England) Martin Poxon	Le Golf National
75th	1991	(Argentina) Eduardo Romero	281	−7	2 strokes	(Spain) José María Olazábal (Scotland) Sam Torrance	Le Golf National
74th	1990	(Republic of Ireland) Philip Walton	275	−5	Playoff	(West Germany) Bernhard Langer	Chantilly
73rd	1989	(England) Nick Faldo (3)	273	−7	1 stroke	(South Africa) Hugh Baiocchi (West Germany) Bernhard Langer (England) Mark Roe	Chantilly
72nd	1988	(England) Nick Faldo (2)	274	−6	2 strokes	(England) Denis Durnian (Australia) Wayne Riley	Chantilly
71st	1987	(Spain) José Rivero	269	−19	1 stroke	(England) Howard Clark	Saint-Cloud
70th	1986	(Spain) Seve Ballesteros (4)	269	−19	1 stroke	(Argentina) Vicente Fernández	La Boulie
69th	1985	(Spain) Seve Ballesteros (3)	263	−21	2 strokes	(Scotland) Sandy Lyle	Saint-Germain
68th	1984	(West Germany) Bernhard Langer	270	−18	1 stroke	(Spain) José Rivero	Saint-Cloud
Paco Rabanne Open de France
67th	1983	(England) Nick Faldo	277	−11	Playoff	(Spain) José María Cañizares (England) David J. Russell	La Boulie
66th	1982	(Spain) Seve Ballesteros (2)	278	−10	4 strokes	(Scotland) Sandy Lyle	Saint-Nom-la-Bretèche
65th	1981	(Scotland) Sandy Lyle	270	−14	4 strokes	(West Germany) Bernhard Langer	Saint-Germain
64th	1980	(Australia) Greg Norman	268	−20	10 strokes	(England) Ian Mosey	Saint-Cloud
French Open
63rd	1979	(Scotland) Bernard Gallacher	284	−8	1 stroke	(Scotland) Willie Milne	Lyon
62nd	1978	(South Africa) Dale Hayes	269	−19	11 strokes	(Spain) Seve Ballesteros	La Baule
61st	1977	(Spain) Seve Ballesteros	282	−6	3 strokes	(South Africa) John Bland (Spain) Antonio Garrido (Spain) Manuel Piñero (Australia) Ian Stanley	Le Touquet
60th	1976	(South Africa) Vincent Tshabalala	272	−16	2 strokes	(Spain) Salvador Balbuena	Le Touquet
59th	1975	(Scotland) Brian Barnes	281	−3	2 strokes	(England) Neil Coles (Republic of Ireland) Eamonn Darcy (South Africa) Dale Hayes (Republic of Ireland) John O'Leary	La Boulie
58th	1974	(England) Peter Oosterhuis (2)	284	+4	2 strokes	(England) Peter Townsend	Chantilly
57th	1973	(England) Peter Oosterhuis	280	−4	1 stroke	(England) Tony Jacklin	La Boulie
56th	1972	(United States) Barry Jaeckel	265	−11	Playoff	(England) Clive Clark	La Nivelle; Biarritz-Le Phare
55th	1971	(Taiwan) Lu Liang-Huan	262	−10	2 strokes	(Argentina) Roberto De Vicenzo (Argentina) Vicente Fernández	Biarritz-Le Phare; La Nivelle
Open de France
54th	1970	(Australia) David Graham	268		1 stroke	(France) Jean Garaïalde (Argentina) Florentino Molina	Chantaco; Biarritz-Le Phare
53rd	1969	(France) Jean Garaïalde	277		Playoff	(Argentina) Roberto De Vicenzo	Saint-Nom-la-Bretèche
52nd	1968	(England) Peter Butler	272		4 strokes	(Spain) Sebastián Miguel (England) Peter Townsend	Saint-Cloud
51st	1967	(England) Bernard Hunt	271		3 strokes	(England) Peter Butler	Saint-Germain
50th	1966	(South Africa) Denis Hutchinson	274		1 stroke	(Spain) Ramón Sota	La Boulie
49th	1965	(Spain) Ramón Sota	268		1 stroke	(South Africa) Cobie Legrange	Saint-Nom-la-Bretèche
48th	1964	(Argentina) Roberto De Vicenzo (3)	272		Playoff	(South Africa) Cobie Legrange	Chantilly
47th	1963	(Australia) Bruce Devlin	273		4 strokes	(Australia) Kel Nagle	Saint-Cloud
46th	1962	(Australia) Alan Murray	274		1 stroke	(New Zealand) Bob Charles (Australia) Peter Thomson	Saint-Germain
45th	1961	(Australia) Kel Nagle	271		4 strokes	(Australia) Peter Thomson	La Boulie
44th	1960	(Argentina) Roberto De Vicenzo (2)	275		3 strokes	(United States) Bill Johnston (Argentina) Leopoldo Ruiz	Saint-Cloud
43rd	1959	(Wales) Dave Thomas	276		3 strokes	(England) Peter Alliss	La Boulie
42nd	1958	(Belgium) Flory Van Donck (3)	276		Playoff	(South Africa) Harold Henning	Saint-Germain
41st	1957	(Belgium) Flory Van Donck (2)	266		8 strokes	(England) Peter Alliss (Spain) Ángel Miguel	Saint-Cloud
40th	1956	(Spain) Ángel Miguel	277		4 strokes	(Argentina) Antonio Cerdá (Belgium) Flory Van Donck (South Africa) Trevor Wilkes	Deauville
39th	1955	(United States) Byron Nelson	271		2 strokes	(England) Harry Weetman	La Boulie
38th	1954	(Belgium) Flory Van Donck	275		1 stroke	(Italy) Aldo Casera (Australia) Norman Von Nida	Saint-Cloud
37th	1953	(South Africa) Bobby Locke (2)	276		2 strokes	(England) Max Faulkner	La Boulie
36th	1952	(South Africa) Bobby Locke	268		8 strokes	(Argentina) Antonio Cerdá	Saint-Germain
35th	1951	(Egypt) Hassan Hassanein	273		8 strokes	(Scotland) Jimmy Adams	Saint-Cloud
34th	1950	(Argentina) Roberto De Vicenzo	279		5 strokes	(Spain) Marcelino Morcillo	Chantilly
33rd	1949	(Italy) Ugo Grappasonni	275		4 strokes	(France) Marcel Dallemagne	Saint-Germain
32nd	1948	(France) Firmin Cavalo Jr.	287		2 strokes	(France) Pierre Hausséguy	Saint-Cloud
31st	1947	(England) Henry Cotton (2)	285		3 strokes	(England) John Knipe	Chantilly
30th	1946	(England) Henry Cotton	269		15 strokes	(Belgium) Flory Van Donck	Saint-Cloud
1940–1945: No tournament due to World War II
29th	1939	(Argentina) Martin Pose	285		1 stroke	(England) Tom Odams	Le Touquet
28th	1938	(France) Marcel Dallemagne (3)	282		5 strokes	(France) Pierre Hausséguy	Fourqueux
27th	1937	(France) Marcel Dallemagne (2)	278		3 strokes	(England) Leonard Crawley (a)	Chantilly
26th	1936	(France) Marcel Dallemagne	277		Playoff	(England) Henry Cotton	Saint-Germain
25th	1935	(South Africa) Sid Brews (2)	293		3 strokes	(Jersey) Aubrey Boomer	Le Touquet
24th	1934	(South Africa) Sid Brews	284		2 strokes	(Jersey) Aubrey Boomer (France) Auguste Boyer	Dieppe
23rd	1933	(England) Bert Gadd	283		3 strokes	(France) Auguste Boyer (France) Marcel Dallemagne	Chantilly
22nd	1932	(England) Arthur Lacey	295		4 strokes	(France) René Golias	Saint-Cloud
21st	1931	(Jersey) Aubrey Boomer (5)	291		2 strokes	(England) Percy Alliss (Argentina) Tomas Genta	Deauville
20th	1930	(England) Ernest Whitcombe	282		1 stroke	(France) Auguste Boyer	Dieppe
19th	1929	(Jersey) Aubrey Boomer (4)	283		Playoff	(England) Archie Compston	Fourqueux
18th	1928	(England) Cyril Tolley (a) (2)	283		1 stroke	(England) Henry Kinch	La Boulie
17th	1927	(Scotland) George Duncan (2)	299		2 strokes	(Jersey) Aubrey Boomer	Saint-Germain
16th	1926	(Jersey) Aubrey Boomer (3)	280		5 strokes	(England) Abe Mitchell	Saint-Cloud
15th	1925	(France) Arnaud Massy (4)	291		Playoff	(England) Archie Compston	Chantilly
14th	1924	(England) Cyril Tolley (a)	290		3 strokes	(United States) Walter Hagen	La Boulie
13th	1923	(England) James Ockenden	288		2 strokes	(Jersey) Jack Gaudin	Dieppe
12th	1922	(Jersey) Aubrey Boomer (2)	286		9 strokes	(France) Eugène Lafitte	La Boulie
11th	1921	(Jersey) Aubrey Boomer	284		Playoff	(France) Arnaud Massy	Le Touquet
10th	1920	(United States) Walter Hagen	298		Playoff	(France) Eugène Lafitte	La Boulie
1915–1919: No tournament due to World War I
9th	1914	(England) James Douglas Edgar	288		6 strokes	(Jersey) Harry Vardon	Le Touquet
8th	1913	(Scotland) George Duncan	304		3 strokes	(Scotland) James Braid	Chantilly
7th	1912	(France) Jean Gassiat	289		1 stroke	(Jersey) Harry Vardon	La Boulie
6th	1911	(France) Arnaud Massy (3)	284		7 strokes	(Jersey) Ted Ray	La Boulie
5th	1910	(Scotland) James Braid	298		2 strokes	(France) Arnaud Massy	La Boulie
4th	1909	(England) John Henry Taylor (2)	293		1 stroke	(Scotland) James Braid	La Boulie
3rd	1908	(England) John Henry Taylor	300		4 strokes	(France) Arnaud Massy (England) Charles Mayo	La Boulie
2nd	1907	(France) Arnaud Massy (2)	298		2 strokes	(France) Jean Gassiat	La Boulie
1st	1906	(France) Arnaud Massy	292		11 strokes	(Jersey) Tom Vardon	La Boulie

== See also ==
- Open golf tournament
