= Hassan Hassanein =

Egyptian golfer (1916–1957)

Personal information
- Nationality: Egypt
- Born: 1916 Cairo, Egypt
- Died: 2 January 1957 (aged 40) Cairo, Egypt

Career
- Sport: Golf
- Status: Professional
- Professional wins: 17

Best results in major championships
- Masters Tournament: DNP
- PGA Championship: DNP
- U.S. Open: DNP
- The Open Championship: T17: 1953

Hassan Hassanein (1916 – 2 January 1957) was an Egyptian professional golfer.

== Career ==
In 1916, Hassanein was born in Cairo. He began his golf career as a caddy. He is considered Egypt's greatest professional golfer and played internationally.

In 1957, Hassanein died in Cairo at the age of 40 when a kerosene cook stove exploded.

== Professional wins ==
this list is probably incomplete

- 1946 Desert Open
- 1947 Desert Open
- 1948 Desert Open
- 1949 Desert Open, Egyptian Open, Italian Open
- 1950 Desert Open, Egyptian Open
- 1951 Desert Open, Egyptian Open, Egyptian Match Play Championship, French Open
- 1952 Desert Open, Egyptian Open
- 1953 Desert Open
- 1954 Desert Open
- 1956 Desert Open

== Results in major championships ==
Tournament	1950	1951	1952	1953	1954	1955
The Open Championship	T30	44		T17		T27

Note: Hassanein only played in The Open Championship.

Did not play

"T" = tied

== Team appearances ==
- World Cup (representing Egypt): 1955, 1956
