= Golf de Saint-Nom-la-Bretèche =

Golf course in France

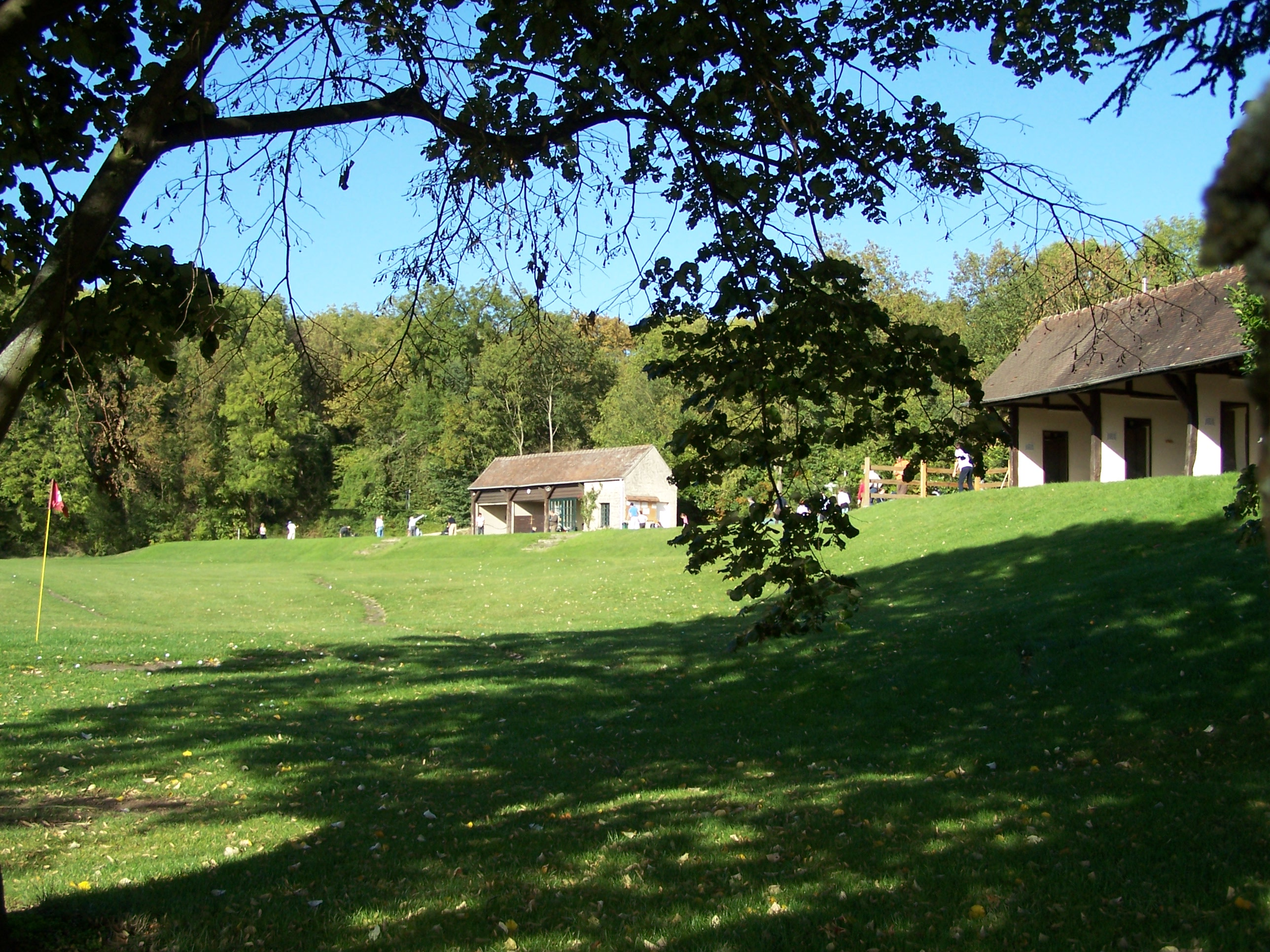

- Location in France
- 48.8521°N 2.0366°E

Club information
- Location: Saint-Nom-la-Bretèche, France
- Established: 1959, 67 years ago
- Type: Private
- Tota holes: 36
- Tournaments: Trophée Lancôme; Open de France; 1963 Canada Cup
- Website: golfdesaintnomlabreteche.com

Rouge Course
- Designed by: Fred Hawtree
- Par: 72
- Length: 6,252 metres (6,837 yd)

Bleu Course
- Designed by: Fred Hawtree
- Par: 72
- Length: 6,167 metres (6,744 yd)

Golf de Saint-Nom-la-Bretèche (French pronunciation: [sɛ̃ nɔ̃ la bʁətɛʃ]) is a 36-hole golf complex in Saint-Nom-la-Bretèche, Yvelines department, 25 km west of central Paris, France.

== History ==
Danieal Féau conceived the project in 1954 and Mr. Entem, mayor of Saint-Nom-la-Bretèche, officially revealed the project of a golf course to the town council in 1957. Designed by Fred Hawtree, 1959 saw the opening of the first of two 18-hole courses, the Rouge, and in 1960 the Bleu followed. The Rouge was rated the 10th best in France by Golf Digest in 2020.

Several of the best players in France have been attached to the club, such as Catherine Lacoste, Cécilia Mourgue d'Algue, Gaëtan Mourgue D'Algue, Marc Pendariès and more recently Philippe Lima, Victor Dubuisson, Marine Monnet, Cassandra Kirkland and Victor Riu.

== Tournaments ==
Saint-Nom-la-Bretèche hosted the 1963 Canada Cup, an event later renamed the World Cup, which gave the club an international reputation as Jack Nicklaus won five strokes ahead of Arnold Palmer and Sebastián Miguel of Spain.

It hosted the Open de France, the oldest national open in continental Europe, 3 times between 1965 and 1982.

Between 1970 and 2003 Saint-Nom-la-Bretèche was home to the Trophée Lancôme, from 1982 onwards an official money event on the European Tour. Created by Saint-Nom resident Gaëtan Mourgue D'Algue and chairman of the Lancôme Company Pierre Menet, it attracted some of the best golfers of its day. Past champions include World Golf Hall of Famers such as Arnold Palmer, Gary Player, Seve Ballesteros, Lee Trevino, Bernhard Langer, Sandy Lyle, Colin Montgomerie, Ian Woosnam and Mark O'Meara.

The Seve Trophy, a biennial European Tour match between Great Britain & Ireland and Continental Europe, was staged here three times. The Trophy was named in honor of Seve Ballesteros, five times major winner and considered one of the most successful golfer from Continental Europe.

=== Professional tournaments ===
- World Cup – 1963
- Open de France – 1965 · 1969 · 1982
- Trophée Lancôme – 1970–2003
- Seve Trophy – 2009 · 2011 · 2013

=== Amateur tournaments ===
- Eisenhower Trophy – 2022
