= Guyancourt =

- Commune
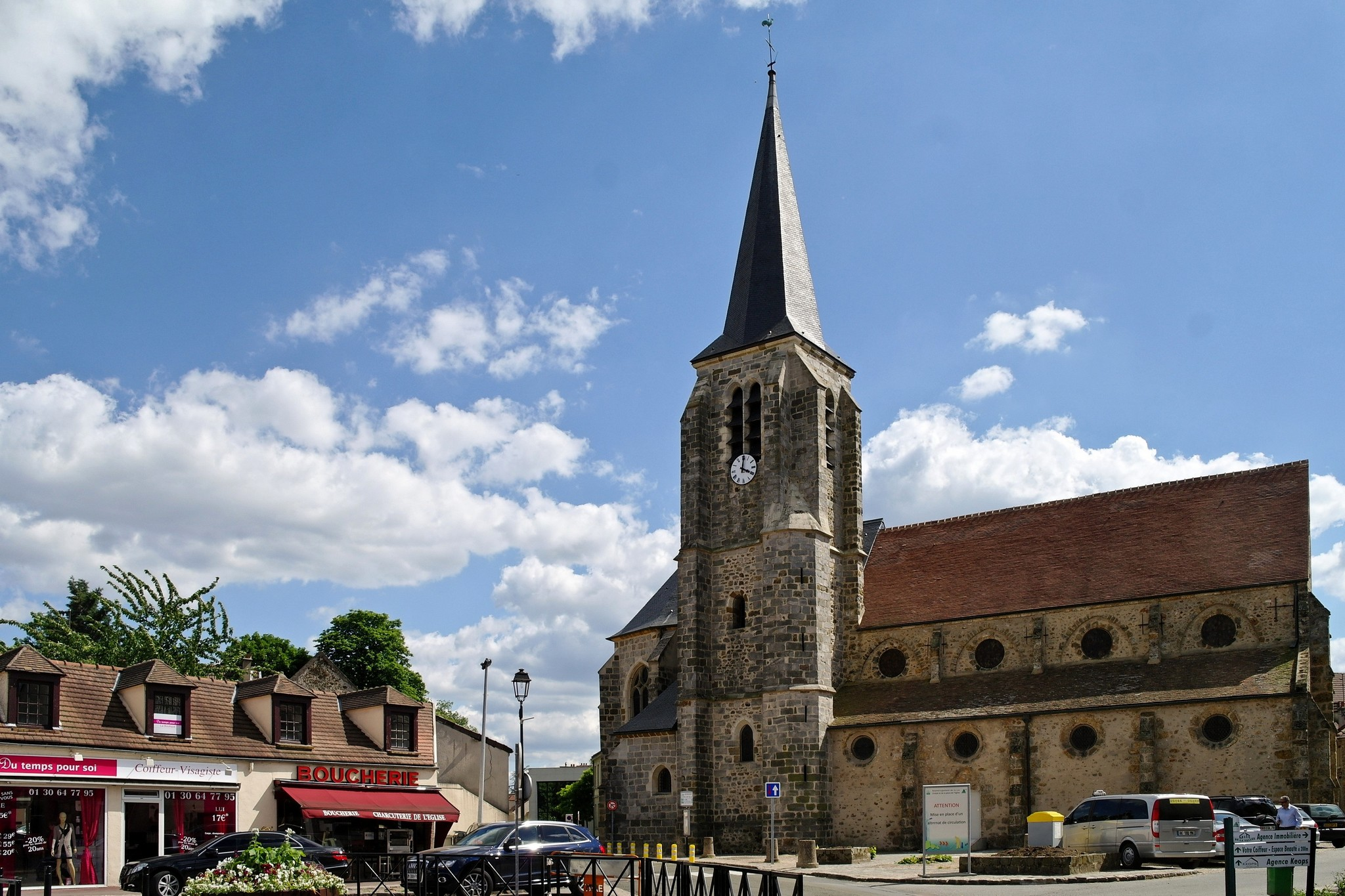
- The Church of Saint-Victor in Guyancourt

- Coat of arms

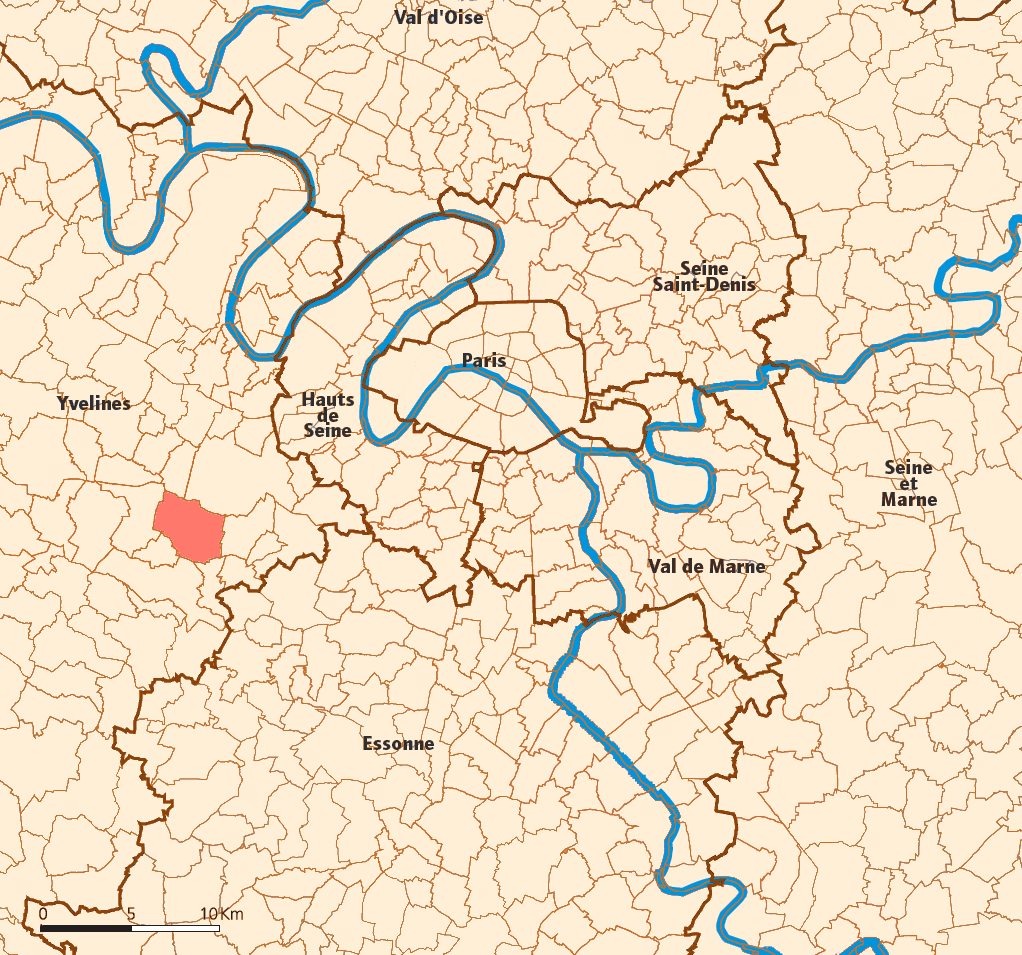
- Location (in red) within Paris inner and outer suburbs
- Location of Guyancourt
- Location within France Location within Île-de-France (region)
- Coordinates: 48°46′17″N 2°04′26″E
- Country: France
- Region: Île-de-France
- Department: Yvelines
- Arrondissement: Versailles
- Canton: Montigny-le-Bretonneux
- Intercommunality: Saint-Quentin-en-Yvelines

Government
  - Mayor (2020–2026): François Morton
- Area^{1}: 13.0 km^{2} (5.0 sq mi)
- Elevation: 138 m (453 ft)
- Population (2023): 29,778
  - Density: 2,290/km^{2} (5,930/sq mi)
- Time zone: UTC+01:00 (CET)
  - Summer (DST): UTC+02:00 (CEST)
- INSEE/Postal code: 78297 /78280
- ^{1} French Land Register data, which excludes lakes, ponds, glaciers > 1 km^{2} (0.386 sq mi or 247 acres) and river estuaries.

Guyancourt (French: [ɡɥi.jɑ̃.kuʁ]) is a commune in the Yvelines department in the Île-de-France region in north-central France. It is located in the south-western suburbs of Paris, 21.2 km (13.2 mi) from the center of Paris, in the "new town" of Saint-Quentin-en-Yvelines.

== Geography ==
The commune of Guyancourt comprises several districts. The first of them, corresponding to the old village, is known as "le village", the others are named:

- Bouviers (Herdsmen), ancient hamlet of the village
- Les Garennes (the warrens)
- L'Europe (Europe)
- Le Pont du Routoir (the bridge over the retting pit)
- Les Saules (the Willows)
- Le Parc (the Park)
- Les Chênes (the Oaks)
- Villaroy (the recently constructed districts of the city)

The bordering communes are Versailles to the northeast, Voisins-le-Bretonneux to the southwest, Montigny-le-Bretonneux to the west, Châteaufort to the southeast, Magny-les-Hameaux to the south and Saint-Cyr-l'Ecole in the northwest.

Although located in the Paris suburbs, more than half of the territory of the commune of Guyancourt is covered in natural spaces: forests, wood, parks, gardens and ponds.

== History ==
=== Prehistoric ===
The site of the city was already inhabited by Neolithic tribes who left hundreds of vestiges such as arrows, flint scrapers, polished axes... which have been recovered in the districts of Bouviers, Troux and Villaroy.

=== Antiquity ===
The civilization continued through Roman times, as Mr. Leclère, a farmer, demonstrated in a fortuitous way in 1892 by unearthing an antique ballot box in his field.

=== The religious life ===
Work to restore the church Saint-Victor put the date of the sarcophages at the Merovingian era (from the seventh century). It is believed that the construction of the first church dates from the fourteenth century. Several funerary vases and a tomb stone dating from the sixteenth century were updated. The church was renovated in the fifteenth century, then entirely rebuilt in the sixteenth century. The most recent restoration goes back to 1998.

=== Guyancourt and the Palace of Versailles ===
Guyancourt forms part of the "Grand Parc" of the sun king Soleil (Louis XIV), which extended around the castle of Versailles. The essential vocation of the populous communes neighbouring the castle is market-gardening, to provide for the important needs for the Court.

=== French revolution ===
Thanks to the register of grievances sent to the governmental authorities (1789), we know that Guyancourtois, who were mostly modest peasants, lived with difficulty under conditions of famine.

=== The Franco-Prussian War of 1870 ===
France is partly occupied by the Prussian armies. The enemy spreads terror, the houses are plundered, the inhabitants maltreated. Four hundred of them (an enormous figure for the time) prefer to flee.

=== The 1900s ===
At the beginning of the twentieth century, Guyancourt was a large village where one cultivates corn, oats, beets, fodder and potatoes. The trades were numerous, with almost 16 wine merchants for 614 inhabitants.

The war of 1914–1918 cost the lives of thirty-six Guyancourtois. The war of 1939–1945 also touched Guyancourt, which was liberated by August 25, 1944.

==== The end of the twentieth century ====
The Hôtel de Ville

Starting from the beginning of the 1950s, the Paris area saw a considerable demographic growth. To structure the development of the suburbs, it was decided to create several new towns around Paris, one of which being Saint-Quentin-en-Yvelines. The new city of Saint-Quentin-en-Yvelines includes today seven communes (eleven in the beginning), one of which is Guyancourt. In 1950 Guyancourt was only one small village. The commune grew since 1970 to reach the figure of 27,000 inhabitants in 2004.

The Hôtel de Ville was completed in 1995.

== Population ==
Historical population

Year	Pop.	±% p.a.
1793	548	—
1821	610	+0.38%
1846	699	+0.55%
1872	636	−0.36%
1901	614	−0.12%
1926	848	+1.30%
1946	856	+0.05%
1962	1,244	+2.36%
1968	1,493	+3.09%

Year	Pop.	±% p.a.
1975	3,450	+12.71%
1982	10,983	+17.99%
1990	18,307	+6.60%
1999	25,079	+3.56%
2007	28,563	+1.64%
2012	28,039	−0.37%
2017	28,633	+0.42%
2023	29,778	+0.66%

Source: EHESS and INSEE (1968–2023)

== International relations ==
Guyancourt is twinned with:

- Linlithgow, Scotland, United Kingdom, the birthplace of Mary, Queen of Scots
- Pegnitz, Germany

== Notable people ==
- Roland Nadaus: Poet, writer, lampoonist, storyteller, lyric writer, novelist, local councillor and départemental. The author of about thirty works, he also assumed several mandates of mayor, advising general, and President of the urban community (then called the SAN, trade union of new agglomeration).

== Economy ==
=== Industrial fabric ===
Guyancourt accommodates not only many SME and trade, but also several large companies, such as:

- Le Technocentre Renault (automobile)
- The head office of Bouygues Construction
  - At one time parent company Bouygues had its head office in the Kevin Roche-designed Challenger complex.
- The national case of Crédit Agricole (finance)
- The registered office of McDonald's, France
- Prost Grand Prix (closed now).

== Education ==
=== Higher education and research ===
- Guyancourt is home to a campus of the University of Versailles-Saint-Quentin. The buildings located in the commune relate to the lessons on human rights and the social sciences.
- One also finds there research laboratories of the INRA (National Institute of Agronomic Research)

=== Primary and secondary schools ===
Junior high schools:

- Collège Ariane
- Collège Les Saules
- Collège Paul-Eluard

Senior high schools:

- Lycée Polyvalent Descartes
- Lycée de Villaroy
- Lycée Émilie-de Breteuil
- Lycée d'hôtellerie et de tourisme de Guyancourt

== Transportation ==
Guyancourt is served by no station of the Paris Métro, RER, or suburban rail network. The closest station to Guyancourt is Saint-Quentin-en-Yvelines–Montigny-le-Bretonneux station on Paris RER line C, on the Transilien La Défense suburban rail line U, and on the Transilien Paris-Montparnasse suburban rail line N. This station is located in the neighbouring commune of Montigny-le-Bretonneux, 2.7 km (1.7 mi) from the town center of Guyancourt. It can also be reached by bus from the Versailles-Chantiers station, which is well connected by many rail and bus services.

== See also ==
- Communes of the Yvelines department
