= Steven Tiley =

English golfer

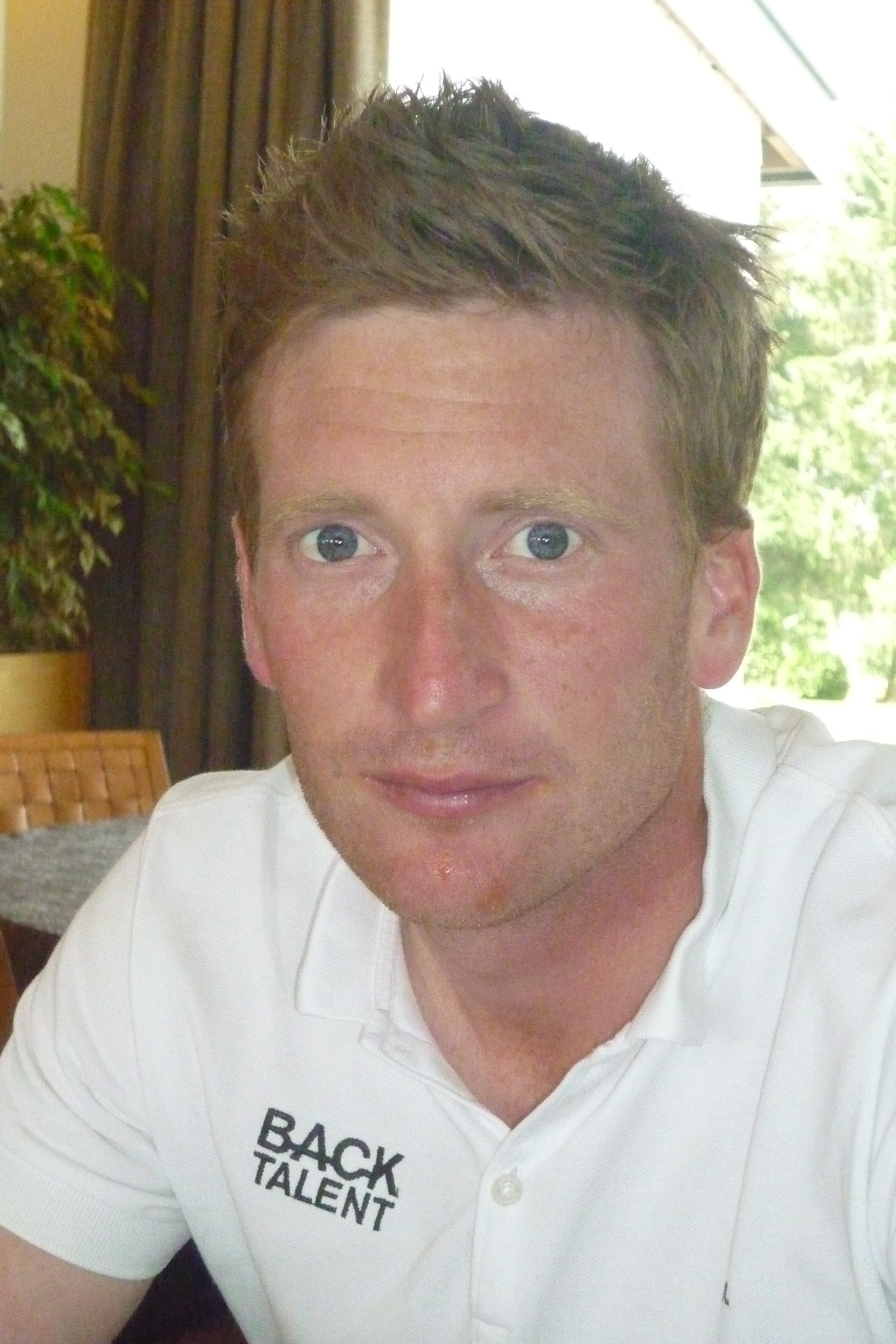

Personal information
- Full name: Steven John Tiley
- Nationality: England
- Born: 11 September 1982 (age 44) Canterbury, England
- Height: 5 ft 11 in (1.80 m)
- Weight: 170 lb (77 kg; 12 st)

Career
- Sport: Golf
- College: Georgia State University
- Turned professional: 2007
- Current tour: Challenge Tour
- Former tours: European Tour; Asian Tour
- Professional wins: 6

Number of wins by tour
- Challenge Tour: 1
- Other: 5

Best results in major championships
- Masters Tournament: DNP
- PGA Championship: DNP
- U.S. Open: DNP
- The Open Championship: T26: 2013

Achievements and awards
- Jamega Tour Order of Merit winner: 2009

Steven John Tiley (born 11 September 1982) is an English professional golfer.

== Early life and amateur career ==
Tiley was born in Canterbury. He was assisted by College Prospects of America and attended Georgia State University.

== Professional career ==
In 2007, Tiley turned professional. Having failed to reach the final stage of the European Tour qualifying school, he gained his card on the Asian Tour. Tiley had three top 10 finishes during his first season, but finished just outside the top 65 on the Order of Merit that was required to retain his playing status.

Tiley began the 2009 season on the Jamega Tour, a UK-based developmental tour. After a strong start, winning three tournaments, he started to play in some events on the second tier Challenge Tour. Later in the year he won the Egyptian Open, a Challenge Tour specially approved tournament prior to it becoming a full tour event in 2010.

Since 2010 Tiley has played mainly on the Challenge Tour. He qualified for the European Tour in 2011 and 2017 but had little success and returned to the Challenge Tour. He did not win on the Challenge Tour until July 2019, when he won the Le Vaudreuil Golf Challenge, although he has been runner-up four times before that, in 2010, 2013, 2016 and 2018.

== Professional wins (6) ==
=== Challenge Tour wins (1) ===
No.	Date	Tournament	Winning score	Margin of victory	Runner-up
1	14 Jul 2019	Le Vaudreuil Golf Challenge	−11 (64-68-69-72=273)	1 stroke	(England) Richard Bland

=== Jamega Pro Golf Tour wins (3) ===
- 2009 Jamega Tour at Mentmore, Jamega Tour at The Vale, Jamega Tour at The Vale of Glamorgan

=== Other wins (2) ===
- 2009 Egyptian Open
- 2018 Farmfoods British Par 3 Championship

== Results in major championships ==
Tournament	2004	2005	2006	2007	2008	2009	2010	2011	2012	2013
The Open Championship	CUT						T68		CUT	T26

Note: Tiley only played in The Open Championship.

Did not play

CUT = missed the half-way cut
"T" = tied

== Team appearances ==
Amateur

- European Amateur Team Championship (representing England): 2005 (winners)
- Palmer Cup: 2005

== See also ==
- 2010 European Tour Qualifying School graduates
- 2016 European Tour Qualifying School graduates
